= Bill Monroe discography =

The discography of the American bluegrass musician Bill Monroe includes a selection of compilation albums. No duplicates are listed.

== Discography ==
=== 78/45 RPM singles ===
Year of release	Title	Label	Number
1940	"Mule Skinner Blues" / "Six White Horses"	Bluebird	Bb 8568
1940	"No Letter In the Mail" / "Cryin' Holy Unto My Lord"	Bluebird	Bb 8611
1940	"Dog House Blues" / "Katy Hill"	Bluebird	Bb 8692
1940	"I Wonder If You Feel the Way I Do" / "Tennessee Blues"	Bluebird	Bb 8813
1941	"Blue Yodel No.7" / "In the Pines"	Bluebird	Bb 8861
1941	"The Coupon Song" / "Orange Blossom Special"	Bluebird	Bb 8893
1941	"Shake My Mother's Hand For Me" / "Were You There"	Bluebird	Bb 8953
1941	"Honky Tonk Swing" / "Back Up and Push"	Bluebird	Bb 8988
1945	"True Life Blues" / "Footprints In the Snow"	Columbia	20080
1946	"Rocky Road Blues" / "Kentucky Waltz"	Columbia	36907
1946	"Mansions For Me" / "Mother's Only Sleeping"	Columbia	20107
1946	"Blue Yodel No.4" / "Will You Be Loving Another Man?"	Columbia	20189
1946	"Goodbye Old Pal" / "Blue Moon of Kentucky"	Columbia	20370
1946	"Blue Grass Special" / "How Will I Explain About You"	Columbia	20384
1947	"Shine Hallelujah Shine" / "I'm Travelin' On and On"	Columbia	20402
1947	"My Rose of Old Kentucky" / "Sweetheart You Done Me Wrong"	Columbia	20423
1947	"I Hear A Sweet Voice Calling" / "Little Cabin Home On the Hill"	Columbia	20459
1947	"That Home Above" / "Little Community Church"	Columbia	20488
1947	"Summertime Is Past and Gone" / "Wicked Path of Sin"	Columbia	20503
1948	"It's Mighty Dark To Travel" / "When You Are Lonely"	Columbia	20526
1948	"Toy Heart" / "Bluegrass Breakdown"	Columbia	20552
1948	"The Old Cross Road" / "Remember the Cross"	Columbia	20576
1948	"Heavy Traffic Ahead" / "Along About Daybreak"	Columbia	20595
1948	"I'm Going Back To Old Kentucky" / "Molly and Tenbrooks"	Columbia	20612
1949	"The Girl In the Blue Velvet Band" / "Bluegrass Stomp"	Columbia	20648
1949	"Can't You Hear Me Calling" / "Travelin' This Lonesome Road"	Columbia	20676
1950	"New Mule Skinner Blues" / "My Little Georgia Rose"	Decca	46222
1950	"The Old Fiddler" / "Alabama Waltz"	Decca	46236
1950	"I'm Blue, I'm Lonesome" / "Boat of Love"	Decca	46254
1950	"Bluegrass Ramble" / "Memories of You"	Decca	46266
1950	"Uncle Pen" / "When the Golden Leaves Begin To Fall"	Decca	46283
1951	"On the Old Kentucky Shore" / "Poison Love"	Decca	46298
1951	"Lord Protect My Soul" / "River of Death"	Decca	46305
1951	"Kentucky Waltz" / "Prisoner's Song"	Decca	46314
1951	"Swing Low, Sweet Chariot" / "Angels Rock Me To Sleep"	Decca	46325
1951	"Rotation Blues" / "Lonesome Truck Driver's Blues"	Decca	46344
1951	"I'll Meet You In Church Sunday Morning" / "Get Down On Your Knees and Pray"	Decca	46351
1951	"Highway of Sorrow" / "Sugar Coated Love"	Decca	46369
1951	"Brakeman's Blues" / "Travelin' Blues"	Decca	46380
1951	"Christmas Time's A-Coming" / "The First Whippoorwill"	Decca	46386
1952	"Raw Hide" / "Letter From My Darling"	Decca	46392
1952	"I'm On My Way To the Old Home" / "The First Whippoorwill"	Decca	28045
1952	"When the Cactus Is In Bloom" / "Sailor's Plea"	Decca	28183
1952	"Pike County Breakdown" / "A Mighty Pretty Waltz"	Decca	28356
1952	"Footprints In the Snow" / "In the Pines"	Decca	28416
1953	"You're Drifting Away" / "Walking In Jerusalem"	Decca	28608
1953	"Cabin of Love" / "Country Waltz"	Decca	28749
1954	"Memories of Mother and Dad" / "The Little Girl and the Dreadful Snake"	Decca	28878
1954	"I Hope You Have Learned" / "Wishing Waltz"	Decca	29009
1954	"Y'all Come" / "Changing Partners"	Decca	29021
1954	"Get Up John" / "White House Blues"	Decca	29141
1954	"Happy On My Way" / "He Will Set Your Fields On Fire"	Decca	29196
1955	"Blue Moon of Kentucky" / "Close By"	Decca	29289
1955	"I'm Working On A Building" / "A Voice From On High"	Decca	29348
1955	"Cheyenne" / "Roanoke"	Decca	29406
1955	"Wait A Little Longer, Please Jesus" / "Let the Light Shine Down On Me"	Decca	29436
1956	"Put My Little Shoes Away" / "Wheel Hoss"	Decca	29645
1956	"On and On" / "I Believed In You Darling"	Decca	29886
1957	"You'll Find Her Name Written There" / "Sitting Alone In the Moonlight"	Decca	30178
1957	"A Fallen Star" / Four Walls"	Decca	30327
1958	"Molly and Tenbrooks" / "I'm Sitting On the Top of the World"	Decca	30486
1958	"Sally-Jo" / "Brand New Shoes"	Decca	30647
1959	"Panhandle Country" / "Scotland"	Decca	30739
1959	"Gotta Travel On" / "No One But My Darlin'*	Decca	30809
1959	"Tomorrow I'll Be Gone" / "Dark As the Night, Blue As the Day"	Decca	30944
1960	"Lonesome Wind Blues" / "Come Go With Me"	Decca	31031
1961	"Precious Memories" / "Jesus Hold My Hand"	Decca	31107
1961	"Linda Lou" / "Put My Rubber Doll Away"	Decca	31218
1961	"Blue Grass Part 1" / "Flowers of Love"	Decca	31346
1962	"Toy Heart" / "Danny Boy"	Decca	31409
1963	"Blue Ridge Mountain Blues" / "How Will I Explain About You"	Decca	31456
1963	"There Was Nothing We Could Do" / "Big Sandy River"	Decca	31487
1963	"New John Henry Blues" / "Devil's Dream"	Decca	31540
1964	"Darlin' Corey" / "Salt Creek"	Decca	31596
1964	"Shenandoah Breakdown" / "Mary At the Home Place"	Decca	31658
1965	"Jimmie Brown, the Newsboy" / "Cindy"	Decca	31802
1965	"I Live In the Past" / "There's An Old, Old House"	Decca	31878
1966	"Going Home" / "Master Builder"	Decca	31943
1967	"When My Blue Moon Turns To Gold Again" / "Pretty Fair Maiden In the Garden"	Decca	32075
1968	"Train 45" / "Is the Blue Moon Still Shining"	Decca	32245
1968	"The Gold Rush" / "Virginia Darlin'"	Decca	32404
1969	"I Haven't Seen Mary In Years" / "Crossing the Cumberlands"	Decca	32502
1969	"Fireball Mail" / "With Body and Soul"	Decca	32574
1970	"Bonny" / "Sweet Mary and the Miles In Between"	Decca	32645
1970	"Walk Softly On My Heart" / "McKinley's March"	Decca	32654
1971	"Going Up Caney" / "Tallahassee"	Decca	32827
1972	"My Old Kentucky and You" / "Lonesome Moonlight Waltz"	Decca	32966
1973	"Foggy Mountain Top" / "Tall Pines"	MCA	40006
1973	"Down Yonder" / "Swing Low, Sweet Chariot"	MCA	40220
1977	"My Sweet Blue Eyed Darling" / "Monroe's Blues"	MCA	40675

=== Studio albums ===
Year	Title	Label	Number	Notes
1958	Knee Deep in Blue Grass	Decca	DL 8731	Reissued in UK as Brunswick 8259
1959	I Saw the Light	Decca	DL 8769	Reissued as MCA 527
1961	Mr. Blue Grass	Decca	DL 4080	Reissued as MCA 82
1962	Bluegrass Ramble	Decca	DL 4266	Reissued as MCA 88
1963	Bluegrass Special	Decca	DL 4382	Reissued as MCA 97; Reissued in UK as Brunswick 8579
1964	I'll Meet You in Church Sunday Morning	Decca	DL 4537	Reissued as MCA 226
1967	Blue Grass Time	Decca	DL 4896	Reissued as MCA 116
1970	Kentucky Blue Grass	Decca	DL7 5213	Reissued as MCA 136
1972	Uncle Pen	Decca	DL7 5347	Reissued as MCA 500
1973	Father & Son (with James Monroe)	MCA	310	
1974	Road of Life	MCA	426	
1976	The Weary Traveler	MCA	2173	Reissued as MCA 707
1977	Bill Monroe Sings Bluegrass, Body and Soul	MCA	2251	Reissued as MCA 708
1977	Bluegrass Memories	MCA	2315	Reissued as MCA 872
1978	Together Again (with James Monroe)	MCA	2367	Reissued as MCA 633
1981	Master of Bluegrass	MCA	5214	
1983	Bill Monroe and Friends	MCA	5435	
1985	Stars of the Bluegrass Hall of Fame	MCA	5625	
1987	Bluegrass ' 87	MCA	5970	Reissued as MCA 31310
1988	Southern Flavor	MCA	42133	
1991	Cryin' Holy Unto the Lord	MCA	10017	

=== Compilations ===
Year	Title	Label	Number	Notes
1961	The Great Bill Monroe and his Blue Grass Boys	Harmony	HL 7290	
1962	The Father of Bluegrass Music	RCA Camden	CAL 719	Reissued as RCA ACL 7059
1962	My All Time Country Favorites	Decca	DL 4327	Reissued in Japan as Decca 5086
1964	Bill Monroe Sings Country Songs	Vocalion	VL 3702	Reissued as Coral CB 20099
1964	Bill Monroe's Best	Harmony	HL 7315	
1965	Bluegrass Instrumentals	Decca	DL 4601	Reissued as MCA 104
1965	The Original Blue Grass Sound	Harmony	HL 7338	
1966	The High, Lonesome Sound of Bill Monroe and his Blue Grass Boys	Decca	DL 4780	Reissued as MCA 110
1968	Bill Monroe's Greatest Hits	Decca	DL7 5010	Reissued as MCA 17
1969	Bill Monroe and Charlie Monroe	Decca	DL7 5066	Reissued as MCA 124
1969	A Voice from on High	Decca	DL7 5135	Reissued as MCA 131
1970	16 All-Time Greatest Hits	Columbia	CS 1065	
1971	Bill Monroe's Country Music Hall of Fame	Decca	DL7 5281	Reissued as MCA 140
1973	Bill Monroe and his Blue Grass Boys (1950–60)	MCA	9224-27	4 vol.; Japanese issue -
1975	Best of Bill Monroe and his Blue Grass Boys	MCA	2696	Double album; European issue
1975	The Best of Bill Monroe	MCA	2 4090	Double album
1975	Bill Monroe and his Blue Grass Boys Vol. II (1950–1972)	MCA	9269-71	3 vol; Japanese issue -
1976	Bill Monroe & His Bluegrass Boys Vol.1	CBS Sony	20AP11	Japanese issue
1976	Bill Monroe & His Bluegrass Boys Vol.2	CBS Sony	20AP12	Japanese issue
1976	New Greatest Hits	CBS Sony	20AP27	Japanese issue
1978	The Original Bluegrass Band	Rounder	SS 06	
1980	Country Hall of Fame	Coral	CDL 8505	UK issue
1981	The Classic Bluegrass Recordings, Vol. 1	County	CCS 104	
1981	The Classic Bluegrass Recordings, Vol. 2	County	CCS 105	
1981	Singles Collection Vol.1	MCA	VIM 4068	Japanese issue
1981	Singles Collection Vol.2	MCA	VIM 4069	Japanese issue
1981	Singles Collection Vol.3	MCA	VIM 4070	Japanese issue
1981	Singles Collection Vol.4	MCA	VIM 4071	Japanese issue
1983	Bill Monroe 1950-54	Collector's Classics	CC 18	German issue
1984	Bill Monroe	Columbia	FC 38904	
1985	Classic Bluegrass Instrumentals	Rebel	850	Canadian issue
1987	In the Pines	Rebel	853	Canadian issue reissued as County CCS 114
1989	Bluegrass 1950-1958	Bear Family	BCD 15423	4 vol; German issue
1991	Bill Monroe	MCA	D 10082	Part of the Country Music Hall of Fame series
1991	Mule Skinner Blues	RCA Victor	2494-2-R	Reissued as Country Legends
1991	Bluegrass 1959-1969	Bear Family	BCD 15529	4 vol; German issue
1992	The Essential	Columbia	C2K 52478	Double album
1994	The Music of Bill Monroe 1936-94	MCA	D4 11048	4 vol.
1994	Bluegrass 1970-1979	Bear Family	BCD 15606	4 vol; German issue
1996	16 gems	Columbia	CK 53908	
1997	Bluegrass Breakdown	Javelin	PRACD 4003	
1997	The Father of Bluegrass Music	RCA Victor	BVCP 7464	Japanese issue
1998	The Early Years	Vanguard	VCD 79518	
1999	The Best of	MCA	088170109-2	
1999	The Best of	MCA	MCF 2696	
1999	Blue Grass Special Memories	Raintree	RR 599	
1999	Lookin' Back	Silver Eagle	SEA 70007	
1999	Father of Bluegrass: the Early Years	ASV	AJA 5298	1940-47; UK issue
2000	American Traveler	County	CCS 119	
2000	The Father of Bluegrass	Castle Pulse	PLS 359	UK issue
2001	Mansions For Me	Music Mill Entertainment	MME 71007	
2001	36 All-time favorites	Universal Music	-	3 vol.
2002	The Very Best of	MCA	088112982-2	Reissued as The Definitive Collection
2003	All the Classic Releases 1937-1949	JSP	7712	4 vol.; UK issue
2003	Gotta Travel On	MCA	MCLD 19403	
2003	Bill Monroe Anthology 1950-81	MCA	088113207-2	
2003	Blue Moon of Kentucky 1936-49	Bear Family	BCD 16399	6 vol; German issue
2003	Blue...Blue...Bluegrass	Black Cat	BCCD 0074	Czech issue
2004	The King and the Father	Music Mill Entertainment	MME 70048	
2004	The Gospel Spirit	MCA	290702	
2004	Far Across the Blue Water	Bear Family	BCD 16624	4 vol; German issue
2005	Shady Grove	Fruit Tree	FT 843	Italian issue
2005	Nine Pound Hammer	Tomato	TMT 2154	
2005	I Saw the Light	Universal Music	B0004618-02	
2007	My Last Days On Earth 1981-84	Bear Family	BCD 16637	4 vol; German issue
2009	Bill Monroe and His Bluegrass Boys	JSP	77119	4 vol.; UK issue

=== Live albums ===
Year	Title	Label	Number	Notes
1973	Bean Blossom	MCA	2 8002	Double album
1975	Bill Monroe & Doc Watson - Sings Country Songs	FBN	210	Limited release
1976	Bill Monroe's Bluegrass Festival	Country Music Magazine	CM 1039	Limited release
1979	Bean Blossom '79	MCA	3209	Reissued in Japan as MCA VIM 6222
1980	Radio Shows 1946-48	Country Canada	BGC 80	Canadian issue
1981	Orange Blossom Special	Stack-O-Hits	9001	Reissued as Hollywood HCD-409 At His Best, and in Germany as Astan 20018
1982	Live Radio	Country Road	CR 02	Canadian issue
1989	Live At the Opry	MCA	076742228620	
1993	Live Recordings 1956-69 Vol.1	Smithsonian Folkways	40063	
1993	Bill Monroe & Doc Watson - Live Duet Recordings	Smithsonian Folkways	40064	1963-1980
1999	Live From Mountain Stage	Blue Plate Music	BPM 400	
2001	Live Vol.1	Rural Rhythm	RHY 1015	
2002	Live At Vanderbilt	Bear Family	BCD 16614	German issue
2003	Two Days At Newport 1963	AndMoreBears	AMD 25001	
2004	Live At Mechanics Hall	Acoustic Disc	ACD 59	
2005	200th Show At the Brown County Jamboree Barn	No Label	No #	
