= Bill Monroe and his Blue Grass Boys Vol. II (1950–1972) =

Best of Bill Monroe and his Blue Grass Boys Vol. II (1950–1972)

Compilation album by Bill Monroe and his Blue Grass Boys
- Released: October 1975
- Recorded: 1950–1972
- Genre: Bluegrass; gospel
- Length: 1:36:33
- Label: MCA
- Producer: Paul Cohen; Owen Bradley; Harry Silverstein; Walter Haynes

Bill Monroe chronology
The Best of Bill Monroe (1975)	Best of Bill Monroe and his Blue Grass Boys Vol. II (1950–1972) (1975)	The Weary Traveler (1976)

Best of Bill Monroe and his Blue Grass Boys Vol. II (1950–1972) is the second Japanese-exclusive compilation album by American bluegrass musician Bill Monroe and his band, the Blue Grass Boys. Released by MCA Records in October 1975, it contains 38 songs over three volumes recorded between 1950 and 1972, most of which were previously released as singles, B-sides, or on other albums. The album was released to mark Monore's second Japanese tour in December 1975 and contains nine recordings that were previously unreleased: three from 1951, one each from 1959, 1966, 1967 and 1968, and two from 1969.

== Track listing ==
=== Disc one ===
Bill Monroe and his Blue Grass Boys Vol. II (1950–1972) disc one track listing
No.	Title	Writer(s)	Original release	Length
1.	"I'll Meet You in Church Sunday Morning" (recorded April 8, 1950)	Bill Monroe	single A-side (1951)	2:49
2.	"Swing Low, Sweet Chariot" (recorded March 5, 1951)	Traditional	"Angels Rock Me to Sleep" B-side (1951)	2:43
3.	"Angels Rock Me to Sleep" (recorded March 17, 1951)	Traditional	single A-side (1951)	2:40
4.	"Brakeman's Blues" (recorded March 29, 1951)	Jimmie Rodgers	"Travelin' Blues" B-side (1951)	2:36
5.	"My Carolina Sunshine Girl" (recorded April 23, 1951)	Rodgers	previously unreleased	2:39
6.	"Ben Dewberry's Final Run" (recorded April 23, 1951)	Andrew Jenkins	previously unreleased	2:42
7.	"Those Gambler's Blues" (recorded April 23, 1951)	Rodgers	previously unreleased	2:35
8.	"Walking in Jerusalem Just Like John" (recorded July 18, 1952)	Monroe	single A-side (1953)	1:57
9.	"Don't Put Off 'Til Tomorrow" (recorded July 18, 1952)	Monroe; Pete Pyle	A Voice from on High (1969)	2:37
10.	"I'm Working on a Building" (recorded January 14, 1954)	A. P. Carter	single A-side (1954)	2:41
11.	"My Little Georgia Rose" (recorded June 26, 1954)	Monroe	The High, Lonesome Sound (1966)	2:41
12.	"Cheyenne" (recorded December 31, 1954)	Monroe	single A-side (1955)	2:51
Total length:				31:31

=== Disc two ===
Bill Monroe and his Blue Grass Boys Vol. II (1950–1972) disc two track listing
No.	Title	Writer(s)	Original release	Length
1.	"A Fallin' Star" (recorded April 20, 1957)	James Joiner	"Four Walls" B-side (1957)	2:10
2.	"Gotta Travel On" (recorded December 1, 1958)	Paul Clayton	single A-side (1958)	2:32
3.	"Tomorrow I'll Be Gone" (recorded January 30, 1959)	Wilma Lee Cooper	"Dark as the Night, Blue as the Day" B-side (1959)	1:57
4.	"Thinking About You" (recorded November 25, 1959)	Lee Fikes; Monroe	previously unreleased	2:55
5.	"Darling Corey" (recorded December 6, 1962)	Traditional	"Salt Creek" B-side (1964)	2:00
6.	"Cindy" (recorded December 10, 1962)	Traditional, arr. Monroe	single A-side (1965)	2:02
7.	"Salt Creek" (recorded March 20, 1963)	Traditional	single A-side (1964)	2:23
8.	"Shenandoah Breakdown" (recorded March 27, 1963)	Monroe	"Mary at the Home Place" B-side (1964)	2:19
9.	"Mary at the Home Place" (recorded January 27, 1964)	Ken Clark	single A-side (1964)	2:22
10.	"Louisville Breakdown" (recorded April 9, 1964)	Monroe	Bill Monroe and Charlie Monroe (1969)	2:18
11.	"There's an Old, Old House" (recorded March 16, 1965)	Hal Bynum; George Jones	"I Live in the Past" B-side (1965)	2:49
12.	"Soldier's Joy" (recorded December 16, 1966)	Traditional	previously unreleased	2:11
Total length:				27:58

=== Disc three ===
Bill Monroe and his Blue Grass Boys Vol. II (1950–1972) disc three track listing
No.	Title	Writer(s)	Original release	Length
1.	"Grey Eagle" (recorded January 23, 1967)	Traditional	previously unreleased	2:13
2.	"Virginia Darlin'" (recorded August 23, 1967)	Monroe	single A-side (1968)	2:56
3.	"Train 45" (recorded November 9, 1967)	Monroe	single A-side (1968)	2:16
4.	"Crossing the Cumberlands" (recorded November 14, 1968)	Monroe	"I Haven't Seen Mary in Years" B-side (1969)	2:42
5.	"Walls of Time" (recorded November 14, 1968)	Monroe	previously unreleased	3:17
6.	"Fireball Mail" (recorded March 26, 1969)	Floyd Jenkins	single A-side (1969)	2:33
7.	"What About You" (recorded April 29, 1969)	Johnnie Wright; Jack Anglin	previously unreleased	3:09
8.	"With Body and Soul" (recorded April 29, 1969)	Virginia Stauffer	"Fireball Mail" B-side (1969)	3:05
9.	"Walk Softly on My Heart" (recorded October 28, 1969)	Jake Landis; Monroe	single A-side (1970)	2:36
10.	"Sweet Mary and the Miles in Between" (recorded December 17, 1969)	Damon Black	previously unreleased	2:56
11.	"McKinley's March" (recorded January 19, 1970)	Monroe	"Walk Softly on My Heart" B-side (1970)	2:25
12.	"Lonesome Moonlight Waltz" (recorded December 3, 1970)	Monroe	"My Old Kentucky and You" B-side (1972)	2:37
13.	"Tallahassee" (recorded December 3, 1970)	Monroe	"Goin' Up Caney" B-side (1971)	2:05
14.	"My Old Kentucky and You" (recorded March 21, 1972)	Monroe	single A-side (1972)	2:14
Total length:				37:04

== Personnel ==
Disc one personnel

- Bill Monroe — mandolin, vocals (lead on all; tenor on tracks 8 and 10)
- Jimmy Martin — guitar (tracks 1, 4 and 8–10), vocals (lead on track 10; tenor on tracks 1, 3 and 8)
- Grady Martin — guitar (tracks 2, 3, 5–7 and 10)
- Jimmie Selph — guitar (tracks 2 and 3)
- Loren "Jack" Shook — guitar (tracks 5–7)
- Edd Mayfield — guitar (track 11)
- Claude "Jackie" Phelps — guitar (track 12)
- Rudy Lyle — banjo (tracks 1, 4–7 and 10), baritone vocals (track 3)
- Sonny Osborne — banjo (track 9)
- Jim Smoak — banjo (track 11)
- Hubert Davis — banjo (track 12)
- Vassar Clements — fiddle (track 1)
- Tommy Jackson — fiddle (tracks 2 and 3)
- James "Hal" Smith — fiddle (tracks 4–7)
- Charlie Cline — fiddle (tracks 9–12), baritone vocals (tracks 8 and 10)
- Merle "Red" Taylor — fiddle (track 11)
- Bobby Hicks — fiddle (track 12)
- Joel Price — string bass (tracks 1 and 4), baritone vocals (track 1)
- Ernie Newton — string bass (tracks 2, 3 and 5–12)
- Ferris Coursey — drums (tracks 2, 3 and 5–7)
- Birch Monroe — bass vocals (track 1)
- Boudleaux Bryant — bass vocals (track 8)
- Milton Estes — bass vocals (track 10)

Disc two personnel

- Bill Monroe — mandolin, vocals (tracks 1, 2, 4–6, 9 and 11)
- Joe Stuart — guitar (tracks 1, 5, 6 and 9), banjo (track 10)
- Vernon "Jack" Cooke — guitar (tracks 2–4)
- Claude "Jackie" Phelps — guitar (tracks 8 and 10)
- Jimmy Elrod — guitar (track 11)
- Peter Rowan — guitar (track 12)
- Don Stover — banjo (track 1)
- Robert "Buddy" Pennington — banjo (tracks 2 and 3)
- Joe Drumright — banjo (tracks 4 and 9)
- Lonnie Hoppers — banjo (tracks 5 and 6)
- Bill "Brad" Keith — banjo (tracks 7 and 8)
- Don Lineberger — banjo (track 11)
- Lamar Grier — banjo (track 12)
- Tommy Jackson — fiddle (track 1)
- Gordon Terry — fiddle (track 1)
- Bobby Hicks — fiddle (tracks 2 and 3)
- Dale Potter — fiddle (track 4)
- Kenny Baker — fiddle (tracks 5–8)
- Horace "Benny" Williams — fiddle (tracks 9–11), guitar (track 7)
- Norman "Buddy" Spicher — fiddle (tracks 10 and 11)
- Richard Greene — fiddle (track 12)
- Bessie Lee Mauldin — string bass (tracks 1–10)
- James Monroe — string bass (tracks 11 and 12)

Disc three personnel

- Bill Monroe — mandolin, vocals (lead on tracks 3, 6, 8 and 9; tenor on tracks 5, 9 and 14)
- Peter Rowan — guitar (track 1)
- Roland White — guitar (tracks 2–5), lead vocals (track 5)
- James Monroe — guitar (tracks 6–14), string bass (tracks 1–5), lead vocals (tracks 7, 9 and 10)
- Joe Stuart — guitar and baritone vocals (track 14)
- Lamar Grier — banjo (track 1)
- Vic Jordan — banjo (tracks 2–5)
- Rual Yarbrough — banjo (tracks 6–11), baritone vocals (track 9)
- Bobby Thompson — banjo (tracks 12 and 13)
- Jack Hicks — banjo (track 14)
- Richard Greene — fiddle (track 1)
- Byron Berline — fiddle (track 2)
- Horace "Benny" Williams — fiddle (track 3)
- Vassar Clements — fiddle (track 3)
- Kenny Baker — fiddle (tracks 4–14)
- Joe "Red" Hayes — fiddle (tracks 6, 9, 12 and 13)
- Tommy Williams — fiddle (tracks 7, 8, 10, 11 and 14)
- Gordon Terry — fiddle (tracks 12 and 13)
- Joe Zinkan — string bass (tracks 6–8, 10 and 11)
- Bill Yates — string bass (track 9)
- Monroe Fields — string bass and lead vocals (track 14)
