= Bluegrass Instrumentals =

Compilation album by Bill Monroe and his Blue Grass Boys
- Released: June 14, 1965
- Recorded: 1951–1963
- Genre: Bluegrass
- Length: 27:05
- Label: Decca
- Producer: Paul Cohen; Owen Bradley; Harry Silverstein

Bill Monroe chronology
| I'll Meet You in Church Sunday Morning (1964) | Bluegrass Instrumentals (1965) | The Original Blue Grass Sound (1965) |

Bluegrass Instrumentals is the sixth compilation album by American bluegrass musician Bill Monroe and his band, the Blue Grass Boys. Released by Decca Records on June 14, 1965, it features 12 instrumentals recorded between 1951 and 1963, many of which were previously unreleased.

== Background ==
The idea for Bluegrass Instrumentals originated from a disagreement between Bill Monroe and manager Ralph Rinzler on what to release after the recording of Bluegrass Special and I'll Meet You in Church Sunday Morning during 1962. During the summer of 1963, Monroe stated that he wanted to work on an album of banjo-centric songs, whereas Rinzler favored a retrospective collection of older recordings; this latter idea was actually announced in Billboard magazine in July 1963, with the compilation slated to be a "two-volume record" titled The Bill Monroe Story released that winter. The impasse was eventually resolved, with Bluegrass Instrumentals — although not entirely a "banjo album" — issued in June 1965 and The High, Lonesome Sound of Bill Monroe and his Blue Grass Boys following a year later.

Bluegrass Instrumentals contains 12 instrumentals recorded as early as 1951 and as recently as 1963. Seven tracks were previously unreleased, with the remaining five — "Get Up John", "Panhandle Country", "Scotland", "Raw Hide" and "Wheel Hoss" — issued in previous years as singles or B-sides. Two of the new tracks ("Sailor's Hornpipe" and "Santa Claus") were "banjo-driven tunes" recorded in 1963 with Bill Keith, while the other five were primarily fiddle-based. The album was noted as being one of the first in bluegrass music to include extended liner notes (written by Rinzler) and recording details for each track, leading future Monroe biographer Neil Rosenberg to call it "the first historically-oriented collection of Monroe's recordings" in his book, Bluegrass: A History.

== Reception ==
Billboard magazine described the tracks on Bluegrass Instrumentals as "foot-tapping instrumentals" featuring the "tremendous mandolin playing of Bill Monroe".

== Track listing ==
All tracks are written by Bill Monroe; track 2 co-written by Bill Keith.

Bluegrass Instrumentals track listing
| No. | Title | Original release | Length |
|---|---|---|---|
| 1. | "Stoney Lonesome" (recorded January 30, 1959) | previously unreleased | 2:08 |
| 2. | "Sailor's Hornpipe" (recorded March 20, 1963) | previously unreleased | 1:55 |
| 3. | "Tall Timber" (recorded September 16, 1955) | previously unreleased | 2:22 |
| 4. | "Get Up John" (recorded November 28, 1953) | "White House Blues" B-side (1954) | 2:08 |
| 5. | "Brown County Breakdown" (recorded September 16, 1955) | previously unreleased | 2:24 |
| 6. | "Panhandle Country" (recorded April 8, 1958) | single A-side (1958) | 2:02 |
| 7. | "Big Mon" (recorded December 1, 1958) | previously unreleased | 2:15 |
| 8. | "Santa Claus" (recorded March 27, 1963) | previously unreleased | 3:14 |
| 9. | "Scotland" (recorded April 8, 1958) | "Panhandle Country" B-side (1958) | 1:50 |
| 10. | "Raw Hide" (recorded January 20, 1951) | "Letter from My Darlin'" B-side (1952) | 2:32 |
| 11. | "Monroe's Hornpipe" (recorded December 1, 1958) | previously unreleased | 2:00 |
| 12. | "Wheel Hoss" (recorded December 31, 1954) | "Put My Little Shoes Away" B-side (1955) | 2:15 |
| Total length: | | | 27:05 |

== Personnel ==
- Bill Monroe — mandolin
- Vernon "Jack" Cooke — guitar (tracks 1, 7 and 11)
- Horace "Benny" Williams — guitar (track 2)
- Charlie Cline — guitar (tracks 3 and 5), fiddle (tracks 4 and 12)
- Jimmy Martin — guitar (tracks 4 and 10)
- Edd Mayfield — guitar (tracks 6 and 9)
- Claude "Jackie" Phelps — guitar (tracks 8 and 12)
- Robert "Buddy" Pennington — banjo (tracks 1, 7 and 11)
- Bill "Brad" Keith — banjo (tracks 2 and 8)
- Joe Stuart — banjo (tracks 3 and 5)
- Rudy Lyle — banjo (tracks 4 and 10)
- Joe Drumright — banjo (tracks 6 and 9)
- Hubert Davis — banjo (track 12)
- Bobby Hicks — fiddle (tracks 1, 3, 5–7, 9, 11 and 12)
- Charlie Smith — fiddle (track 1)
- Kenny Baker — fiddle (tracks 2, 6, 8 and 9)
- Gordon Terry — fiddle (tracks 3 and 5)
- Vassar Clements — fiddle (tracks 3 and 5)
- Merle "Red" Taylor — fiddle (track 10)
- Bessie Lee Mauldin — string bass (tracks 1–3, 5–9 and 11)
- Joel Price — string bass (track 10)
- Ernie Newton — string bass (tracks 4 and 12)

== Sources ==
- Ewing, Tom (September 7, 2018), Bill Monroe: The Life and Music of the Blue Grass Man (Music in American Life), Champaign, Illinois: University of Illinois Press, ISBN 978-0252041891
