= I'll Meet You in Church Sunday Morning =

Studio album by Bill Monroe and his Blue Grass Boys
- Released: June 15, 1964
- Recorded: May 1962–January 1964
- Studio: Columbia Recording Studio (Nashville, Tennessee)
- Genre: Bluegrass; gospel
- Length: 28:12
- Label: Decca
- Producer: Harry Silverstein

Bill Monroe chronology
Bill Monroe's Best (1964)	I'll Meet You in Church Sunday Morning (1964)	Bluegrass Instrumentals (1965)

Singles from I'll Meet You in Church Sunday Morning
- 1. "Going Home" Released: April 25, 1966

I'll Meet You in Church Sunday Morning is the sixth studio album and second gospel album by American bluegrass musician Bill Monroe and his band, the Blue Grass Boys. Released by Decca Records on June 15, 1964, it features 12 songs recorded across seven sessions between May 1962 and January 1964, with producer Harry Silverstein. "Going Home", backed with "Master Builder", was released as the sole single from the album in 1966, almost two years after its release.

== Background ==
Around March 1962, guitarist/vocalist Jimmy Maynard and second fiddler Buddy Spicher were replaced in the Blue Grass Boys lineup by Frank Buchanan and Harold "Red" Stanley (a friend of lead fiddler Benny Williams), respectively. Buchanan was not yet a member of the musicians' union, however, so Maynard and Williams covered for him at Grand Ole Opry appearances until Monroe arranged for his registration a few weeks after he joined. With the new lineup in place (completed by existing members Tony Ellis on banjo and Bessie Lee Mauldin on bass), Monroe's label Decca Records scheduled six recording sessions for the band over the course of April and May, hoping that the result would be enough material for two albums — one of gospel music, the other of "secular" bluegrass.

== Recording ==
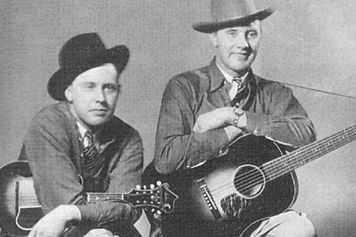
"I Found the Way", the first track recorded for I'll Meet You in Church Sunday Morning, was previously recorded by Monroe with brother Charlie in 1937.

First three sessions: May 10, 16 and 17, 1962

After three sessions for Bluegrass Special and a week of rehearsals, the first recording session for Monroe's next gospel album took place on May 10, 1962. As with the previous release, 1958's I Saw the Light, it was decided that the recordings would not feature banjo or fiddle, so Tony Ellis, Benny Williams and Red Stanley were not present at the first session, with Monroe (mandolin), Frank Buchanan (guitar) and Bessie Lee Mauldin (bass) providing the only instrumental backing. The vocal quartet employed for the session consisted of Buchanan on lead and Monroe on tenor, plus session guests Ray Edenton and Culley Holt (who had performed on I Saw the Light) on baritone and bass, respectively. The three songs recorded at the session were "The Old Country Baptizing", "I Found the Way" and "This World Is Not My Home" — only "I Found the Way" was included on I'll Meet You in Church Sunday Morning, however, with the other two songs not released until 1974's Road of Life.

The second session took place almost a week later, on May 16. During rehearsals in the interim, Monroe and producer Harry Silverstein had decided to feature Ellis' banjo on the remaining tracks, as well as replacing Edenton with Taylor, who was found to be "a capable baritone singer". Recorded at the session were Floyd Hunter's "Way Down Deep in My Soul", Charles E. Moody's "Drifting Too Far from the Shore", and Carl Tipton's "Going Home". Monroe made mistakes during the second and third songs, coming in late with his vocal on the second chorus of the latter, and stopping singing entirely during the same point of the former — "Going Home" was fixed in editing, while "Drifting Too Far from the Shore" was released with the mistake intact. The third session for the album followed the day after, with the band recording "On the Jericho Road", "We'll Understand It Better" and "Somebody Touched Me", the first two of which were ultimately included on the release.

Fourth and fifth sessions: November 23 and December 10, 1962

With only six tracks chosen from the original three sessions for the album, Monroe and his band returned to the studio on November 23, 1962, to finish work on I'll Meet You in Church Sunday Morning. The lineup of the Blue Grass Boys had changed several times since the previous sessions, with Monroe and Mauldin now joined by Lonnie Hoppers on banjo and returning member Kenny Baker on fiddle, with Jimmy Maynard and Joe Stuart alternating guitar duties as temporary stand-ins. Maynard did not take part in the session. The first song recorded on November 23 was "Pass Me Not", on which Hoppers played guitar and Stuart switched to second fiddle. Like several earlier recordings, this track was not featured on the album, and would later show up on Road of Life. The other two songs recorded at the session were gospel standards "The Glory Land Way" and "Farther Along", the latter of which Monroe had performed since the late 1930s. All three tracks featured solo vocals from Monroe. A couple of weeks later, on December 10, the band recorded two more songs for the album: "Master Builder" and "Let Me Rest at the End of My Journey". Again, both songs featured only Monroe on vocals.

Del McCoury played his only session with the Blue Grass Boys on January 28, 1964, which included one track on I'll Meet You in Church Sunday Morning.

Sixth and seventh sessions: January 27 and 28, 1964

Work on the planned gospel album halted for more than a year after the late-1962 sessions, with the next recordings coming from sessions in early-1964. The first of these sessions took place on January 27, featuring a lineup of Joe Stuart on guitar, Joe Drumright on banjo, Benny Williams on fiddle and Bessie Lee Mauldin on bass — Stuart was covering for then-regular Blue Grass Boys guitarist Del McCoury, who had not been told about the session, with Drumright brought in on a session basis to cover Stuart's regular role. The first song recorded was a vocal solo version of Monroe's own composition "I'll Meet You in Church Sunday Morning", which he had originally recorded with his Blue Grass Quartet in 1950. The other two tracks recorded, "Mary at the Home Place" and a remake of "Highway of Sorrow", were not included on the album.

The next day, Monroe and the Blue Grass Boys returned to the studio for another session. McCoury was present at the session, which would turn out to be his only one for the band before he left shortly thereafter. Three more tracks were recorded at the session — Wally Fowler's "One of God's Sheep", which made it onto the album, "Roll On, Buddy, Roll On", which was later featured on Blue Grass Time in 1967, and "Legend of the Blue Ridge Mountains", which did not see a release until 1982.

== Release ==
I'll Meet You in Church Sunday Morning was released by Decca Records on June 15, 1964. On May 3, 1965, almost a year after the album, "Going Home", "On the Jericho Road", "Farther Along" and "Master Builder" were issued as an extended play; and another year later, on April 25, 1966, "Going Home" was issued as a single, backed with "Master Builder".

== Track listing ==
I'll Meet You in Church Sunday Morning track listing
No.	Title	Writer(s)	Length
1.	"I'll Meet You in Church Sunday Morning"	Bill Monroe	3:03
2.	"Drifting Too Far from the Shore"	Charles E. Moody	2:28
3.	"Master Builder"	J. W. Wilson; Wes Martin	2:44
4.	"I Found the Way"	L. E. Green; Adger Pace	2:18
5.	"We'll Understand It Better"	Charles Albert Tindley	2:17
6.	"Let Me Rest at the End of My Journey"	Traditional	2:35
7.	"Going Home"	Carl Tipton	2:03
8.	"One of God's Sheep"	Wally Fowler	2:16
9.	"Way Down Deep in My Soul"	Floyd Hunter	2:29
10.	"On the Jericho Road"	Don McCrossan	2:44
11.	"Farther Along"	William B. Stevens	3:29
12.	"Glory Land Way"	J. S. Torbett	2:02
Total length:			28:12

== Personnel ==
Tracks 2, 4, 5, 7, 9 and 10 (recorded May 10, 16 and 17, 1962)

- Bill Monroe — mandolin, vocals (lead on track 5, tenor on other tracks)
- Frank Buchanan — guitar, lead vocals
- Tony Ellis — banjo (all except track 4)
- Bessie Lee Mauldin — string bass
- Harold "Red" Stanley — baritone vocals (all except track 4)
- Ray Edenton — baritone vocals (track 4)
- Culley Holt — bass vocals

Tracks 3, 6, 11 and 12 (recorded November 23/December 10, 1962)

- Bill Monroe — mandolin, vocals
- Joe Stuart — guitar
- Lonnie Hoppers — banjo
- Kenny Baker — fiddle
- Bessie Lee Mauldin — string bass

Tracks 1 and 8 (recorded January 27 and 28, 1964)

- Bill Monroe — mandolin, vocals
- Joe Stuart — guitar (track 1), fiddle (track 8)
- Del McCoury — guitar (track 8)
- Joe Drumright — banjo
- Horace "Benny" Williams — fiddle
- Bessie Lee Mauldin — string bass

== Bibliography ==
- Ewing, Tom (September 7, 2018), Bill Monroe: The Life and Music of the Blue Grass Man (Music in American Life), Champaign, Illinois: University of Illinois Press, ISBN 978-0252041891
