= Bill Monroe's Greatest Hits =

Compilation album by Bill Monroe and his Blue Grass Boys
- Released: June 17, 1968
- Recorded: 1950–1961
- Genre: Bluegrass; gospel
- Length: 28:19
- Label: Decca
- Producer: Paul Cohen; Owen Bradley

Bill Monroe chronology
| Blue Grass Time (1967) | Bill Monroe's Greatest Hits (1968) | Bill Monroe and Charlie Monroe (1969) |

Bill Monroe's Greatest Hits is the ninth compilation album by American bluegrass musician Bill Monroe and his band, the Blue Grass Boys. Released by Decca Records on June 17, 1968, it features 11 songs recorded between 1950 and 1961 for the label, all of which were originally released as singles, B-sides or album tracks. The album is essentially a repackaging of Decca's 1962 compilation My All Time Country Favorites, sharing eight of its 12 tracks.

== Background ==
Decca issued Bill Monroe's Greatest Hits on June 17, 1968. The album contains eight of the 12 songs previously released by the label on the 1962 compilation My All Time Country Favorites, with the addition of "Molly and Tenbrooks" from 1958's Knee Deep in Blue Grass, 1952 "Footprints in the Snow" B-side "In the Pines" and 1961 recording "Danny Boy" from Bluegrass Ramble. In his biography Bill Monroe: The Life and Music of the Blue Grass Man, future Blue Grass Boys member Tom Ewing described the album as "a new low in [Decca's] handling of Bill's recordings", criticising the duplication of material from My All Time Country Favorites so soon after its release. He suggested that Decca had come up with the idea to release Bill Monroe's Greatest Hits as an alternative to an "all-gospel reissue album" proposed by Monroe's manager Ralph Rinzler and producer Harry Silverstein, which they believed would have less "sales potential" than a simple "greatest hits" album.

== Track listing ==
Bill Monroe's Greatest Hits track listing
| No. | Title | Writer(s) | Original release | Length |
|---|---|---|---|---|
| 1. | "Molly and Tenbrooks" (recorded May 15, 1957) | Traditional | Knee Deep in Blue Grass (1958) | 2:19 |
| 2. | "In the Pines" (recorded July 18, 1952) | Jimmie Davis; Bill Monroe | "Footprints in the Snow" B-side (1952) | 3:08 |
| 3. | "New Mule Skinner Blues" (recorded February 3, 1950) | Jimmie Rodgers; George Vaughn Horton | single A-side (1950) | 2:27 |
| 4. | "Uncle Pen" (recorded October 15, 1950) | Monroe | "When the Golden Leaves Fall" B-side (1950) | 2:42 |
| 5. | "Cheyenne" (recorded December 31, 1954) | Monroe | single A-side (1955) | 2:47 |
| 6. | "Footprints in the Snow" (recorded July 18, 1952) | Rupert Jones | single A-side (1952) | 2:37 |
| 7. | "Y'all Come" (recorded January 8, 1954) | Arlie Duff | "Changing Partners" B-side (1954) | 2:14 |
| 8. | "Gotta Travel On" (recorded December 1, 1958) | Paul Clayton | single A-side (1958) | 2:32 |
| 9. | "Danny Boy" (recorded November 30, 1961) | Frederic Weatherly | Bluegrass Ramble (1962) | 2:36 |
| 10. | "Roanoke" (recorded December 31, 1954) | Joe Ahr | "Cheyenne" B-side (1955) | 2:36 |
| 11. | "Four Walls" (recorded April 20, 1957) | Marvin Moore; George Campbell | single A-side (1957) | 2:21 |
| Total length: | | | | 28:19 |

== Personnel ==
- Bill Monroe — mandolin, vocals (lead on tracks 1, 3, 4, 6, 8, 9 and 11; tenor on tracks 2, 4 and 7)
- Leslie Sandy — guitar (track 1)
- Jimmy Martin — guitar (tracks 2–4, 6 and 7), lead vocals (tracks 2, 4 and 7)
- Claude "Jackie" Phelps — guitar (tracks 5 and 10)
- Grady Martin — guitar (track 7)
- Vernon "Jack" Cooke — guitar (track 8)
- Horace "Benny" Williams — guitar (track 9)
- Don Stover — banjo (tracks 1 and 11)
- Sonny Osborne — banjo (tracks 2 and 6)
- Rudy Lyle — banjo (tracks 3, 4 and 7)
- Hubert Davis — banjo (tracks 5 and 10)
- Robert "Buddy" Pennington — banjo (track 8)
- Tony Ellis — banjo (track 9)
- Gordon Terry — fiddle (tracks 1 and 11)
- Joe Stuart — fiddle (track 1), guitar (track 11)
- Dale Potter — fiddle (track 1)
- Charlie Cline — fiddle (tracks 2, 5–7 and 10)
- Vassar Clements — fiddle (track 3)
- Merle "Red" Taylor — fiddle (track 4)
- Bobby Hicks — fiddle (tracks 5, 8 and 10)
- Norman "Buddy" Spicher — fiddle (track 9)
- Bobby Joe Lester — fiddle (track 9)
- Tommy Jackson — fiddle (track 11)
- Bessie Lee Mauldin — string bass (tracks 1, 8, 9 and 11)
- Ernie Newton — string bass (tracks 2, 5–7 and 10)
- Joel Price — string bass (tracks 3 and 4), baritone vocals (track 4)
