= Kentucky Blue Grass (album) =

Studio album by Bill Monroe and his Blue Grass Boys
- Released: June 29, 1970
- Recorded: February 1964–April 1969
- Studio: Columbia Recording Studio (Nashville, Tennessee)
- Genre: Bluegrass; gospel
- Length: 29:22
- Label: Decca
- Producer: Harry Silverstein

Bill Monroe chronology
A Voice from on High (1969)	Kentucky Blue Grass (1970)	16 All-Time Greatest Hits (1970)

Singles from Kentucky Blue Grass
- 1. "I Live in the Past" Released: December 13, 1965

Kentucky Blue Grass is the eighth studio album by American bluegrass musician Bill Monroe and his band, the Blue Grass Boys. Released by Decca Records on June 29, 1970, it features eleven songs recorded at various points between February 1964 and April 1969, nine of which were previously unreleased. The two tracks already released are "I Live in the Past" (as a single in 1965) and "Is the Blue Moon Still Shining" (as a B-side to "Train 45 (Heading South)" in 1968).

== Recording ==
Unlike Monroe's previous studio albums, which all contained material recorded in a handful of sessions during a short time period, Kentucky Blue Grass draws its track listing from recordings made at various points over a five-year period. The earliest track is a recording of Lonzo and Oscar's "Last Old Dollar", which was recorded on February 3, 1964, just a few days after guitarist and vocalist Del McCoury had left the Blue Grass Boys; the session featured Jimmy Maynard in his place, Joe Stuart on banjo, Benny Williams and Buddy Spicher on twin fiddles, and Bessie Lee Mauldin on bass, with Monroe on vocals. A couple of months later, on April 9, the same lineup (save for the returning Jackie Phelps in place of Maynard) recorded four tracks, two of which were featured on Kentucky Blue Grass: the Benny Williams original composition "Never Again" and the session closer "Fire on the Mountain", which was the last recording on which Stuart performed banjo for the Blue Grass Boys.

The next two recordings featured on the album come from a session on March 16, 1965, featuring a Blue Grass Boys lineup of Jimmy Elrod on guitar, Don Lineberger on banjo (his only session with the group), Williams and Spicher on fiddles, and Monroe's son James on bass. The three songs recorded at the session were Marijohn Wilkin and Danny Dill's "Long Black Veil", Virginia Stauffer's "I Live in the Past", and Hal Bynum and George Jones' "The Old, Old House" — the latter two of which were released together on a single in December 1965. "The Long Black Veil" and "I Live in the Past" were included on Kentucky Blue Grass. "Log Cabin in the Lane" was taken from a session on November 3, 1966, with Peter Rowan on guitar, Lamar Grier on banjo, Richard Greene on fiddle and James Monroe on bass.

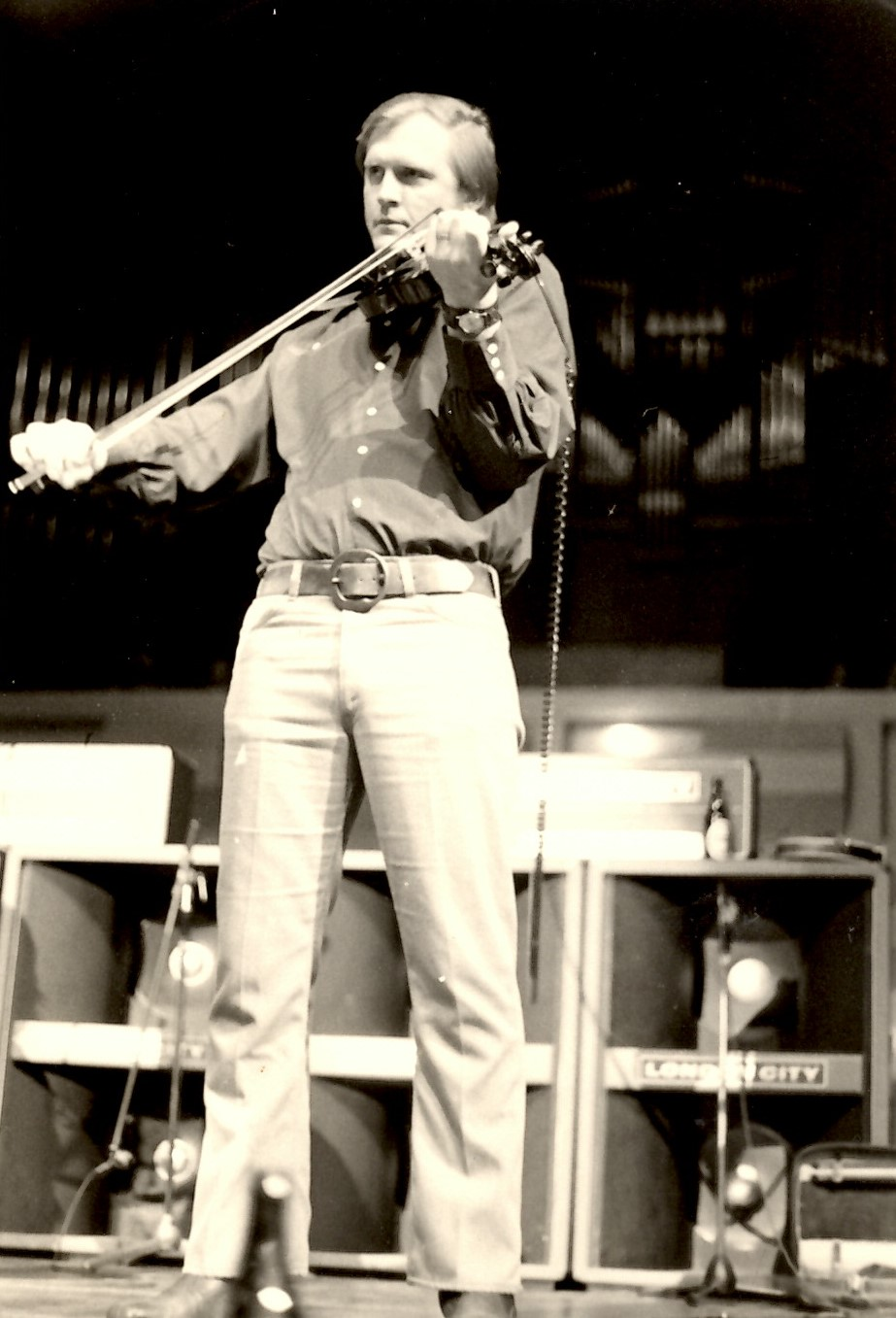
One of the songs on Kentucky Blue Grass comes from Byron Berline's only session as a member of the Blue Grass Boys.

The remaining five songs on Kentucky Blue Grass were recorded after the release of Monroe's previous studio album, Blue Grass Time. One recording comes from the only Blue Grass Boys session to feature fiddler Byron Berline, which took place on August 23, 1967, with the rest of the lineup made up by guitarist Roland White, banjo player Vic Jordan and bassist James Monroe. The Bob Wills and Tommy Duncan standard "Sally Goodin" was featured on the album, with fellow recordings "The Gold Rush" and "Virginia Darlin'" making up a single issued in October 1968. Two more songs from after Berline's departure were included on the album, both from a session on November 9, 1967 — Bill Monroe's "Kentucky Mandolin", featuring Benny Williams as sole fiddler, and Bill's daughter Melissa's "Is the Blue Moon Still Shining", on which Williams backed up Vassar Clements. The latter was initially released alongside fellow session cut "Train 45 (Heading South)" on January 1, 1968.

"I Want to Go with You" is taken from a session on November 14, 1968, which marked the final studio appearances of Roland White and Vic Jordan, as well as the first with Kenny Baker back on fiddle since 1963. The track is the only one on the album to feature a vocal trio, with James Monroe singing lead, Bill Monroe singing tenor, and White singing baritone. The latest recording featured on Kentucky Blue Grass is a performance of the folk standard "Cripple Creek" from April 29, 1969, when Monroe and his band had started work on an album of songs inspired by his "Uncle Pen", Pendleton Vandiver. Alongside James Monroe (who had recently switched to guitar) and Baker (who remained on fiddle), the track also features new banjo player Rual Yarbrough, plus session guests Tommy Williams on lead fiddle and Joe Zinkan on bass.

== Release ==
Kentucky Blue Grass was released by Decca Records on June 29, 1970. According to future Blue Grass Boys member Tom Ewing in his book Bill Monroe: The Life and Music of the Blue Grass Man, it was initially planned that the album would be released earlier so that it could be sold at that year's Bean Blossom Festival in mid-June, but it was delayed due to Monroe's manager Ralph Rinzler's "late completion" of the album's liner notes, which also resulted in the accidental omission of recording session information on the sleeve.

== Reception ==
Professional ratings
Review scores
Source	Rating
Record World	4/5 stars

Kentucky Blue Grass received mixed reviews from critics. Record World magazine gave it a rating of four out of five stars and called it "a good collection of mountain tunes". Writing for Stereo Review, however, Noel Coppage was less enthused, calling the album "far from [Monroe's] best". Coppage criticised a few elements of the recordings, calling Monroe's vocal performance "pretty old and creaky", and complaining that "the banjo is too clean-cut, but worse than that, the fiddle is much too cool", comparing the latter unfavorably to that of former Blue Grass Boys member Chubby Wise. Coppage concluded his review by highlighting "Never Again" as "the selection [on] which the band is best", while stating that "The recording is a little off-hand" but has some worth in featuring new material.

== Track listing ==
Kentucky Blue Grass track listing
No.	Title	Writer(s)	Length
1.	"I Live in the Past" (recorded March 16, 1965)	Virginia Stauffer	2:55
2.	"Cripple Creek" (recorded April 29, 1969)	Traditional	2:18
3.	"Last Old Dollar" (recorded February 3, 1964)	Lloyd George; Rollin Sullivan	2:17
4.	"The Long Black Veil" (recorded March 16, 1965)	Marijohn Wilkin; Danny Dill	2:38
5.	"Log Cabin in the Lane" (recorded November 3, 1966)	Jim Eanes	2:22
6.	"I Want to Go with You" (recorded November 14, 1968)	Bill Monroe	3:05
7.	"Kentucky Mandolin" (recorded November 9, 1967)	Monroe	3:02
8.	"Sally Goodin" (recorded August 23, 1967)	Bob Wills; Tommy Duncan	3:14
9.	"Never Again" (recorded April 9, 1964)	Benny Williams	2:05
10.	"Is the Blue Moon Still Shining" (recorded November 9, 1967)	Melissa Monroe	3:25
11.	"Fire on the Mountain" (recorded April 9, 1964)	Bill Cody; Carl Eugster	2:01
Total length:			29:22

== Personnel ==
Track 3, 9 and 11 (recorded February/April 1964)

- Bill Monroe — mandolin, vocals (lead on both; tenor on track 9)
- Jimmy Maynard — guitar (track 3)
- Claude "Jackie" Phelps — guitar (tracks 9 and 11)
- Joe Stuart — banjo
- Horace "Benny" Williams — fiddle, lead vocals (track 9)
- Norman "Buddy" Spicher — fiddle
- Bessie Lee Mauldin — string bass

Tracks 1 and 4 (recorded March 16, 1965)

- Bill Monroe — mandolin, vocals
- Jimmy Elrod — guitar
- Don Lineberger — banjo
- Horace "Benny" Williams — fiddle
- Norman "Buddy" Spicher — fiddle
- James Monroe — string bass

Track 5 (recorded November 3, 1966)

- Bill Monroe — mandolin, vocals
- Peter Rowan — guitar
- Lamar Grier — banjo
- Richard Greene — fiddle
- James Monroe — string bass

Track 7, 8 and 10 (recorded August/November 1967)

- Bill Monroe — mandolin, vocals
- Roland White — guitar
- Vic Jordan — banjo
- Byron Berline — fiddle (track 8)
- Horace "Benny" Williams — fiddle (tracks 7 and 10)
- Vassar Clements — fiddle (track 10)
- James Monroe — string bass

Track 6 (recorded November 14, 1968)

- Bill Monroe — mandolin, tenor vocals
- Roland White — guitar, baritone vocals
- Vic Jordan — banjo
- Kenny Baker — fiddle
- James Monroe — string bass, lead vocals

Track 2 (recorded April 29, 1969)

- Bill Monroe — mandolin
- James Monroe — guitar
- Rual Yarbrough — banjo
- Kenny Baker — fiddle
- Tommy Williams — fiddle
- Joe Zinkan — string bass

== Bibliography ==
- Ewing, Tom (September 7, 2018), Bill Monroe: The Life and Music of the Blue Grass Man (Music in American Life), Champaign, Illinois: University of Illinois Press, ISBN 978-0252041891
- Rosenberg, Neil V.; Wolfe, Charles K. (June 7, 2007), The Music of Bill Monroe: Music in American Life, Champaign, Illinois: University of Illinois Press, ISBN 978-0252031212
