= Road of Life (album) =

Studio album by Bill Monroe and his Blue Grass Boys
- Released: November 4, 1974
- Recorded: May 1957–March 1970
- Studio: Columbia Recording Studio (Nashville, Tennessee); Bradley's Barn (Mount Juliet, Tennessee)
- Genre: Bluegrass; gospel
- Length: 27:56
- Label: MCA
- Producer: Harry Silverstein; Harold Bradley

Bill Monroe chronology
Bean Blossom (1973)	Road of Life (1974)	Best of Bill Monroe and his Blue Grass Boys (1975)

Road of Life is the tenth studio album and third gospel album by American bluegrass musician Bill Monroe and his band, the Blue Grass Boys. Released by MCA Records on November 4, 1974, it features 11 songs recorded at various points between May 1957 and March 1970, nine of which were previously unreleased. The two already released were "Out in the Cold World" on Knee Deep in Blue Grass in 1958, and "Were You There" on Blue Grass Time in 1967.

== Background ==
MCA Records issued Road of Life on November 4, 1974. The album is made up of nine previously unreleased gospel recordings by Monroe and his Blue Grass Boys at various points between 1962 and 1970, as well as Knee Deep in Blue Grass track "Out in the Cold World" (recorded in 1957) and "Were You There" from Blue Grass Time (recorded in 1963). Half of the new songs come from a recording session on March 26, 1970 which did not feature a bassist, including the Virginia Stauffer-composed title track.

== Track listing ==
Road of Life track listing
No.	Title	Writer(s)	Length
1.	"Road of Life" (recorded March 26, 1970)	Virginia Stauffer	2:56
2.	"This World Is Not My Home" (recorded May 10, 1962)	Traditional	2:28
3.	"Out in the Cold World" (recorded May 15, 1957)	Joe Ahr	2:34
4.	"It's Me Again, Lord" (recorded March 26, 1970)	Dottie Rambo	2:14
5.	"I Will Sing for the Glory of God" (recorded March 26, 1970)	Benjamin F. Logan	2:03
6.	"Beyond the Gate" (recorded March 26, 1970)	Bill Monroe; Jake Landers	1:55
7.	"We're Going Just Over in the Glory Land" (recorded April 9, 1964)	Traditional	2:21
8.	"Pass Me Not" (recorded November 23, 1962)	Monroe	3:52
9.	"The Old Country Baptizing" (recorded May 10, 1962)	Jim Shumate Sr.; Vernon Bryontt	2:13
10.	"Somebody Touched Me" (recorded May 17, 1962)	Monroe; Harold Donny	2:30
11.	"Were You There" (recorded March 20, 1963)	Monroe	2:50
Total length:			27:56

== Personnel ==
Track 3 (recorded May 15, 1957)

- Bill Monroe — mandolin, vocals
- Leslie Sandy — guitar
- Don Stover — banjo
- Joe Stuart — fiddle
- Gordon Terry — fiddle
- Dale Potter — fiddle
- Bessie Lee Mauldin — string bass

Tracks 2, 9 and 10 (recorded May 10/17, 1962)

- Bill Monroe — mandolin, vocals (tenor on all; lead on track 2)
- Frank Buchanan — guitar, lead vocals
- Tony Ellis — banjo (track 10)
- Bessie Lee Mauldin — string bass
- Ray Edenton — baritone vocals (tracks 2 and 9)
- Harold "Red" Stanley — baritone vocals (track 10)
- Culley Holt — bass vocals

Track 8 (recorded November 23, 1962)

- Bill Monroe — mandolin, vocals
- Lonnie Hoppers — guitar
- Kenny Baker — fiddle
- Joe Stuart — fiddle
- Bessie Lee Mauldin — string bass

Track 11 (recorded March 20, 1963)

- Bill Monroe — mandolin, vocals
- Horace "Benny" Williams — guitar
- Bill "Brad" Keith — banjo
- Kenny Baker — fiddle
- Bessie Lee Mauldin — string bass

Track 7 (recorded April 9, 1964)

- Bill Monroe — mandolin, vocals
- Claude "Jackie" Phelps — guitar
- Joe Stuart — banjo
- Horace "Benny" Williams — fiddle
- Norman "Buddy" Spicher — fiddle
- Bessie Lee Mauldin — string bass

Tracks 1 and 4–6 (recorded March 26, 1970)

- Bill Monroe — mandolin, vocals (tenor on all; lead on track 1)
- James Monroe — guitar, lead vocals
- Rual Yarbrough — banjo, baritone vocals
- Kenny Baker — fiddle
- Culley Holt — bass vocals
