= Bill Monroe and Charlie Monroe =

Compilation album by Bill Monroe and Charlie Monroe
- Released: February 24, 1969
- Recorded: 1951–1964
- Genre: Bluegrass; gospel
- Length: 27:37
- Label: Decca
- Producer: Paul Cohen; Owen Bradley; Bob Mooney; Harry Silverstein

Bill Monroe chronology
Bill Monroe's Greatest Hits (1968)	Bill Monroe and Charlie Monroe (1969)	A Voice from on High (1969)

Charlie Monroe chronology
Lord Build Me a Cabin (1965)	Bill Monroe and Charlie Monroe (1969)	Who's Calling You Sweetheart Tonight (1969)

Bill Monroe and Charlie Monroe is a compilation album by American bluegrass musicians Bill Monroe and Charlie Monroe. Released by Decca Records on February 24, 1969, it features 12 songs recorded between 1951 and 1964 — five by Bill Monroe and his Blue Grass Boys, six by Charlie Monroe and his Kentucky Pardners. All but one of the songs had previously been released as singles or B-sides, with the sole new track a 1964 recording of "Louisville Breakdown" by Bill and his band.

== Background ==
Decca continued its steady release of retrospective Bill Monroe compilations with 1969's Bill Monroe and Charlie Monroe, on which songs recorded for singles during the 1950s alternated with tracks by Monroe's brother Charlie and his band, the Kentucky Pardners. The sole previously unreleased track on the collection was "Louisville Breakdown", which Monroe and the Blue Grass Boys recorded in 1964.

== Track listing ==
Bill Monroe and Charlie Monroe track listing
No.	Title	Writer(s)	Original release	Length
1.	"No One but My Darlin'"	Bill Monroe	"Gotta Travel On" B-side (1958)	2:05
2.	"I'm Old Kentucky Bound"	Charlie Monroe	"An Angel in Disguise" B-side (1952)	2:35
3.	"Poison Love"	Elmer Laird	single A-side (1951)	2:35
4.	"Why Did You Say Good-Bye?"	C. Monroe	single A-side (1956)	2:28
5.	"Louisville Breakdown"	B. Monroe	previously unreleased	2:18
6.	"An Angel in Disguise"	Fred Roy; Bert Pink	single A-side (1952)	2:30
7.	"I'm Weary of Heartaches"	C. Monroe	single A-side (1957)	2:41
8.	"The First Whippoorwill"	B. Monroe	"Christmas Time's A-Comin'" B-side (1951)	2:50
9.	"Weep and Cry"	C. Monroe	"I'm Weary of Heartaches" B-side (1957)	2:39
10.	"You're Drifting Away"	B. Monroe	"Walking in Jerusalem" B-side (1953)	2:31
11.	"That's What I Like About You"	C. Monroe	"Why Did You Say Good-Bye?" B-side (1956)	2:25
Total length:				27:37

Notes

- Tracks 1, 3, 5, 8 and 10 were recorded by Bill Monroe and his Blue Grass Boys
- Tracks 2, 4, 6, 7, 9 and 11 were recorded by Charlie Monroe and his Kentucky Pardners

== Personnel ==
Bill Monroe and his Blue Grass Boys tracks

- Bill Monroe — mandolin, vocals (lead on track 1; tenor on 3, 8 and 10)
- Vernon "Jack" Cooke — guitar (track 1)
- Jimmy Martin — guitar and lead vocals (track 3)
- Claude "Jackie" Phelps — guitar (track 5)
- Edd Mayfield — guitar and lead vocals (track 8)
- Carter Stanley — guitar and lead vocals (track 10)
- Robert "Buddy" Pennington — banjo (track 1)
- Rudy Lyle — banjo (tracks 3 and 10), baritone vocals (track 10)
- Joe Stuart — banjo (track 5)
- James "Gar" Bowers — banjo (track 8)
- Bobby Hicks — fiddle (track 1)
- Merle "Red" Taylor — fiddle (track 3)
- Horace "Benny" Williams — fiddle (track 5)
- Norman "Buddy" Spicher — fiddle (track 5)
- Gordon Terry — fiddle (tracks 8 and 10), bass vocals (track 10)
- Bessie Lee Mauldin — string bass (tracks 1 and 5)
- Joel Price — string bass (track 3)
- Oscar "Shorty" Shehan — string bass (track 8)
- Howard "Cedric Rainwater" Watts — string bass (track 10)

Charlie Monroe and his Kentucky Pardners tracks

- Charlie Monroe — guitar, vocals
- Grady Martin — guitar
- Bob Foster — guitar (tracks 2 and 6)
- Harold Bradley — guitar (tracks 4, 7, 9 and 11)
- Don Helms — guitar (tracks 4, 7, 9 and 11)
- Jerry Rivers — fiddle (tracks 2 and 6)
- Tommy Jackson — fiddle (tracks 4, 7, 9 and 11)
- Ernie Newton — string bass (tracks 2 and 6)
- Bob Moore — string bass (tracks 4, 7, 9 and 11)
- Owen Bradley — piano (tracks 4, 7, 9 and 11)
