= Blue Grass Time =

Studio album by Bill Monroe and his Blue Grass Boys
- Released: June 12, 1967
- Recorded: March 20, 1963; January 28, 1964; October 1966–January 1967
- Studio: Columbia Recording Studio (Nashville, Tennessee)
- Genre: Bluegrass
- Length: 31:00
- Label: Decca
- Producer: Harry Silverstein

Bill Monroe chronology
The High, Lonesome Sound of Bill Monroe and his Blue Grass Boys (1966)	Blue Grass Time (1967)	Bill Monroe's Greatest Hits (1968)

Singles from Blue Grass Time
- 1. "When My Blue Moon Turns to Gold Again" Released: December 7, 1966

Blue Grass Time is the seventh studio album by American bluegrass musician Bill Monroe and his band, the Blue Grass Boys. Released by Decca Records on June 12, 1967, it features 12 songs recorded mostly at sessions between October 1966 and January 1967, with two tracks from earlier years. One song from the album was released as a single: "When My Blue Moon Turns to Gold Again" backed with "Pretty Fair Maiden in the Garden" on December 7, 1966.

== Background ==
By October 1966, Bill Monroe and his Blue Grass Boys had not recorded any new material for 19 months. This marked the group's longest break between recording sessions since a 17-month gap between September 1955 and April 1957. Since the last sessions, the lineup of Monroe's band had changed entirely — he was now joined by Peter Rowan on guitar and vocals, who had first started working with the band on a stand-in basis in October 1964 before joining officially; Lamar Grier on banjo, who had replaced Don Lineberger in September 1965; Richard Greene on fiddle, who joined officially in April 1966 after a few months as a stand-in; and his son James Monroe on string bass and vocals, who took over from long-term predecessor Bessie Lee Mauldin around the time Rowan joined.

Ahead of the sessions, Monroe elected that son James, not Rowan, would sing lead vocals. Writing about this decision in his biography Bill Monroe: The Life and Music of the Blue Grass Man, future Blue Grass Boys member Tom Ewing explained: "Others have speculated that Bill was penalizing Rowan for past mistakes, but it seems more likely that he was primarily intent on furthering his son's musical career. Also, the two songs [chosen to record at the first session] had choruses with trio harmony, and Bill knew Rowan had the best voice for the baritone part." James had also already been singing lead in gospel quartet songs at live shows in recent months.

== Recording ==
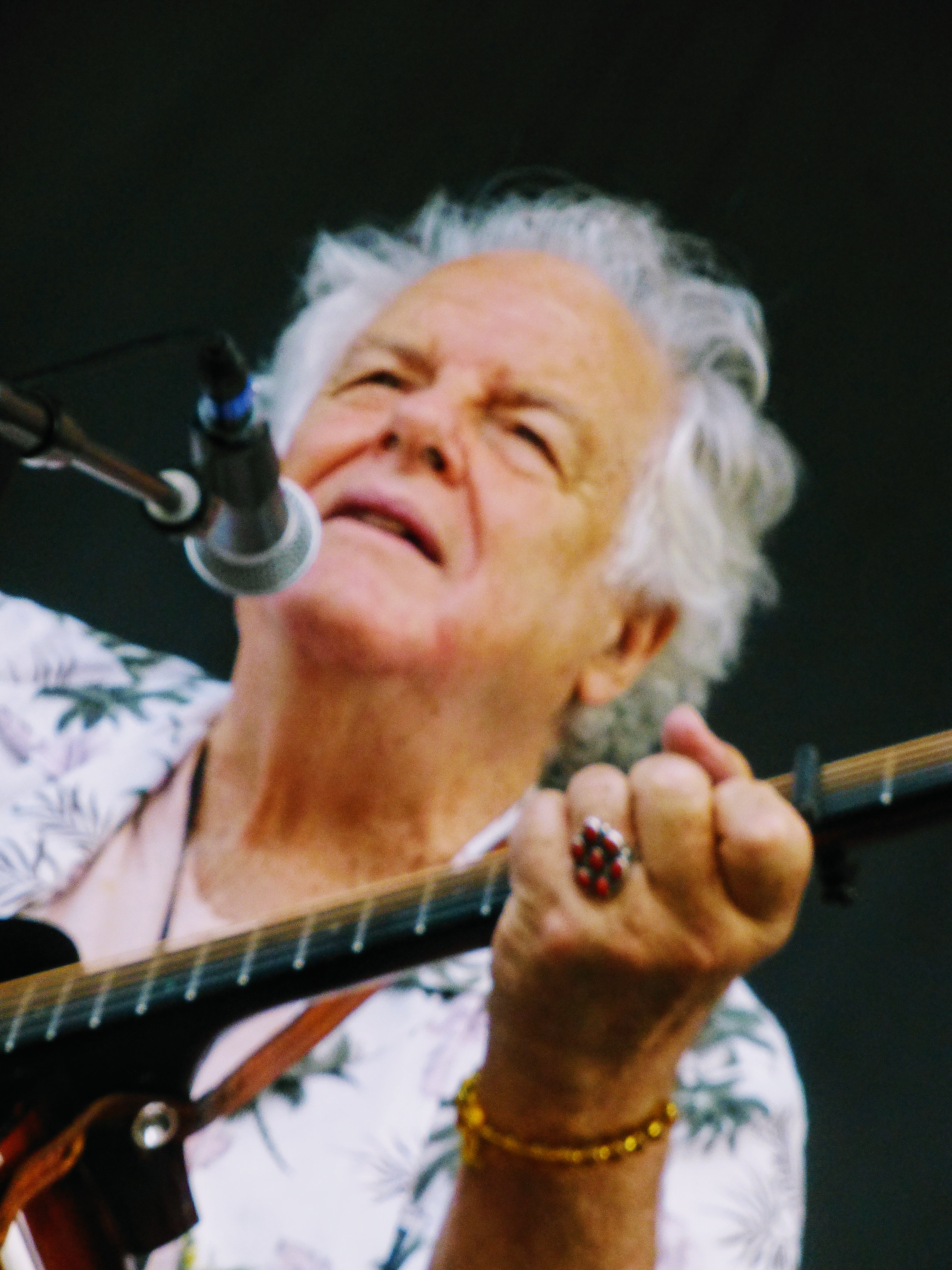
Blue Grass Time is the only Bill Monroe studio album to feature guitarist Peter Rowan.

The first session for what would become Blue Grass Time took place on the evening of October 14, 1966, after a performance on the Grand Ole Opry Friday night show. The three songs recorded at the session were Wiley Walker and Gene Sullivan's "When My Blue Moon Turns to Gold Again", Johnny Bond's "I Wonder Where You Are Tonight" and the folk standard "Turkey in the Straw". For the final song, Lamar Grier recalled that Monroe played faster than expected in the studio, claiming that "Bill started the [tune] at around three times faster than I had [practiced] at home ... I had to deliberately omit some notes to be able to handle the increased speed."

The next session, on November 3, featured Norman "Buddy" Spicher on second fiddle. The band attempted to capitalise on the continuing American folk music revival, focusing on tracks that were already popular with folk audiences. Recorded first was "Pretty Fair Maiden in the Garden", for which Monroe adjusted the key in which he sung as, according to fiddler Richard Greene, he was in "less-than-perfect voice". Former Blue Grass Boys guitarist-singer Jim Eanes' "Log Cabin in the Lane" and Monroe's own instrumental "Paddy on the Turnpike" were also recorded, although they were ultimately not included on the album.

Just over a month later, the band returned to the studio for their third recording session together. Tracked at the session were two songs sung solely by Monroe — Autry Inman's "That's All Right" and Floyd Tillman and Jimmie Davis' "It Makes No Difference Now" — followed by another instrumental standard, "Dusty Miller". A fourth session, held ten days later, started with Peter Rowan's only lead vocal on the album, a recording of the standard "Midnight on the Stormy Deep", which Monroe had "revived" during performances with Doc Watson over the past couple of years. The other two songs recorded were former Monroe Brothers features: "All the Good Times Are Past and Gone", now performed with the vocal trio of James, Bill and Rowan, and "Soldier's Joy", an instrumental not included on the album.

One final session followed in the new year, on January 23, 1967. The only recording featured on Blue Grass Time was the first of two songs completed during the session, a cover of Kirk McGee's "Blue Night" which Rowan recalls was chosen by producer Harry Silverstein rather than Monroe or the band. The session was the last to feature all but James Monroe, with Greene replaced by Byron Berline in early-March, Rowan replaced by Curtis Blackwell later the same month, and Grier replaced by Vic Jordan in late-July. With only ten tracks recorded prior to the personnel changes, Blue Grass Time was completed with the inclusion of two songs recorded in previous years: a 1963 re-recording of "Were You There" with Benny Williams on guitar, Bill Keith on banjo, Kenny Baker on fiddle and Bessie Lee Mauldin on bass, and a 1964 recording of "Roll On Buddy" featuring Del McCoury on guitar, Joe Drumright on banjo, Williams and Joe Stuart on fiddles, and Mauldin on bass.

== Release ==
Blue Grass Time was released by Decca Records on June 12, 1967. The photograph on the front cover of the album's sleeve was taken shortly after Byron Berline replaced Richard Greene in spring 1967, showing Monroe flanked by the new fiddler and son James. The only single released from the album was "When My Blue Moon Turns to Gold Again", backed with "Pretty Fair Maiden in the Garden", on December 7, 1966 — in between the third and fourth sessions for the album.

== Reception ==
Blue Grass Time received positive reviews from critics. Cash Box magazine called the album "A stirring effort from start to finish" and an "exciting blue grass package", predicting that it "could make a healthy amount of sales noise" and "sell well". Similarly, Record World praised the collection for featuring "Some of the blue grassiest fiddling this or any other side of Kentucky", suggesting that "The album could appeal to non-country addicts who are exposed to it". Billboard magazine also predicted that the album would attract folk fans, proclaiming that "Bill Monroe is in a class all by himself".

== Personnel ==
Blue Grass Time track listing
No.	Title	Writer(s)	Length
1.	"Turkey in the Straw" (recorded October 14, 1966)	Traditional	2:08
2.	"I Wonder Where You Are Tonight" (recorded October 14, 1966)	Johnny Bond	2:34
3.	"That's All Right" (recorded December 6, 1966)	Autry Inman	2:38
4.	"All the Good Times Are Past and Gone" (recorded December 16, 1966)	Traditional	2:38
5.	"Pretty Fair Maiden in the Garden" (recorded November 3, 1966)	Traditional	2:45
6.	"Roll On Buddy" (recorded January 28, 1964)	Teddy Wilburn; Doyle Wilburn	2:11
7.	"Blue Night" (recorded January 23, 1967)	Kirk McGee	2:37
8.	"Midnight on the Stormy Deep" (recorded December 16, 1966)	Traditional	3:40
9.	"Were You There" (recorded March 20, 1963)	Bill Monroe	2:50
10.	"It Makes No Difference Now" (recorded December 6, 1966)	Floyd Tillman; Jimmie Davis	2:06
11.	"Dusty Miller" (recorded December 6, 1966)	Traditional	2:19
12.	"When My Blue Moon Turns to Gold Again" (recorded October 14, 1966)	Wiley Walker; Gene Sullivan	2:34
Total length:			31:00

== Personnel ==
Track 9 (recorded March 20, 1963)

- Bill Monroe — mandolin, vocals
- Horace "Benny" Williams — guitar
- Bill "Brad" Keith — banjo
- Kenny Baker — fiddle
- Bessie Lee Mauldin — string bass

Track 6 (recorded January 28, 1964)

- Bill Monroe — mandolin, lead and tenor vocals
- Del McCoury — guitar, lead vocals (chorus only)
- Joe Drumright — banjo
- Horace "Benny" Williams — fiddle
- Joe Stuart — fiddle
- Bessie Lee Mauldin — string bass

Tracks 1–5, 7, 8 and 10–12 (recorded October 1966–January 1967)

- Bill Monroe — mandolin, vocals (lead on tracks 2, 3, 5, 7, 10 and 12; tenor on tracks 2, 4, 8 and 12)
- Peter Rowan — guitar, vocals (lead on track 8; baritone on tracks 2 and 12)
- Lamar Grier — banjo
- Richard Greene — fiddle
- Norman "Buddy" Spicher — fiddle (track 5)
- James Monroe — string bass, lead vocals (tracks 2, 4 and 12)

== Bibliography ==
- Ewing, Tom (September 7, 2018), Bill Monroe: The Life and Music of the Blue Grass Man (Music in American Life), Champaign, Illinois: University of Illinois Press, ISBN 978-0252041891
