= Bluegrass Special =

Studio album by Bill Monroe and his Blue Grass Boys
- Released: June 17, 1963
- Recorded: April–December 1962
- Studio: Columbia Recording Studio (Nashville, Tennessee)
- Genre: Bluegrass
- Length: 29:50
- Label: Decca
- Producer: Owen Bradley; Harry Silverstein

Bill Monroe chronology
My All Time Country Favorites (1962)	Bluegrass Special (1963)	Early Blue Grass Music (1963)

Singles from Bluegrass Special
- 1. "Blue Ridge Mountain Blues" Released: January 14, 1963; 2. "Big Sandy River" Released: April 29, 1963

Bluegrass Special is the fifth studio album by American bluegrass musician Bill Monroe and his band, the Blue Grass Boys. Released on June 17, 1963, by Decca Records, it features 12 songs recorded across five sessions at Columbia Recording Studio in Nashville, Tennessee between April and December 1962, with producers Owen Bradley and Harry Silverstein. Two songs from the album were issued as singles before the album's release: "Blue Ridge Mountain Blues" and "Big Sandy River".

== Background ==
Around March 1962, guitarist/vocalist Jimmy Maynard and second fiddler Buddy Spicher were replaced in the Blue Grass Boys lineup by Frank Buchanan and Harold "Red" Stanley (a friend of lead fiddler Benny Williams), respectively. Buchanan was not yet a member of the musicians' union, however, so Maynard and Williams covered for him at Grand Ole Opry appearances until Monroe arranged for his registration a few weeks after he joined. With the new lineup in place (completed by existing members Tony Ellis on banjo and Bessie Lee Mauldin on bass), Monroe's label Decca Records scheduled six recording sessions for the band over the course of April and May, hoping that the result would be enough material for two albums — one of gospel music, the other of "secular" bluegrass.

== Recording ==
Fiddler Kenny Baker is credited as a co-writer on two of the four songs he recorded for Bluegrass Special.

First session: April 25, 1962

The first session with the new lineup took place on April 25, 1962. The focus of the session were three songs written or co-written by Chuck Carson, a singer-songwriter Monroe had met in 1955: "There Was Nothing We Could Do", "I Was Left on the Street" and "Cheap Love Affair" (the latter two of which were co-written by Monroe). Carson attended the session "to help the band learn the songs", which created a sense of uncertainty in the studio; Buchanan has recalled that he told Monroe he couldn't record the tracks, as he wasn't familiar with them, to which the bandleader jokingly replied "You know 'em as good as I do. I don't know 'em either."

Second session: April 26, 1962

The next day, the band returned to the studio for a second session. According to future Blue Grass Boys member and Monroe biographer Tom Ewing, the focus of the session was on recording "some older songs for folk music fans", in light of the continued popularity of the genre as part of the American folk music revival. The first song they recorded at this session was Alfred Bryan and Kerry Mills' "When the Bees Are in the Hive", previously recorded by multiple country artists from the 1920s onwards. The second track recorded was "Big Ball in Brooklyn", a Monroe original written during his time working with brother Charlie. The song was not included on Bluegrass Special, however, and remained unreleased until it was featured on a Bear Family Records compilation in 1991. The third and final track recorded on April 26 was "Columbus Stockdale Blues", a folk song that Buchanan, Ellis and Mauldin had recently been performing as part of Shenandoah Valley Trio sets. Ellis has credited predecessor Rudy Lyle with the inspiration for the song's "distinctive" banjo break.

Third session: May 3, 1962

On May 3, the band returned to the studio for the last of the three scheduled sessions for the upcoming album. This session was the first to be produced by Harry Silverstein, who took over from Owen Bradley as Monroe's regular producer. The three tracks recorded, which all made it to the album, were Cliff Hess composition "Blue Ridge Mountain Blues" (suggested by Buchanan), Monroe original "How Will I Explain About You" (originally recorded by the "classic" lineup of the Blue Grass Boys), and Fred Rose's "Foggy River" (previously recorded for Decca by Red Foley).

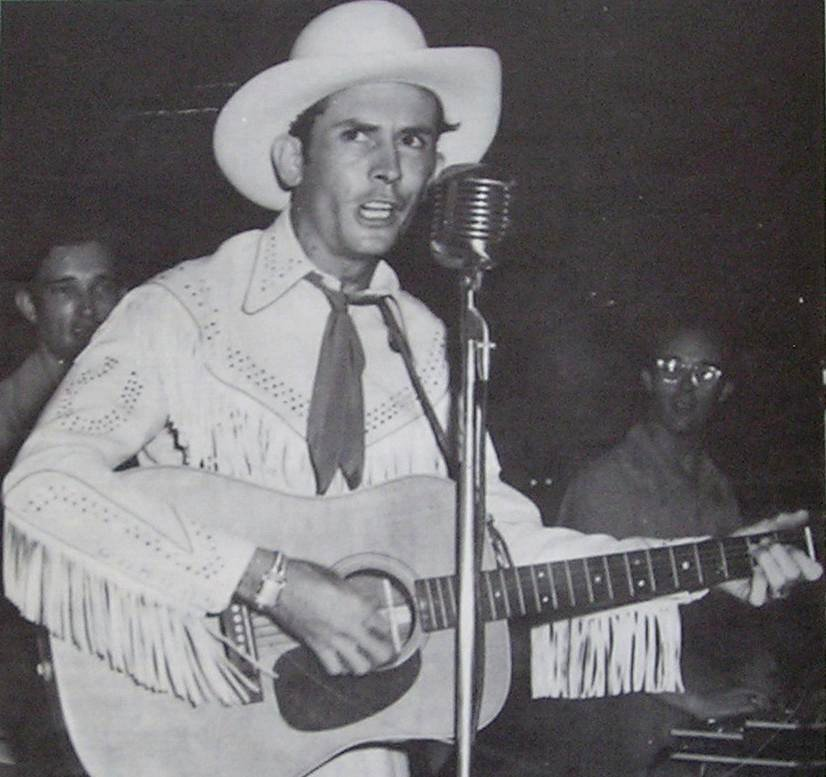
One of four songs recorded in late-1962 for Bluegrass Special was Hank Williams' "I'm So Lonesome I Could Cry" — the fourth of his songs recorded by Monroe and the Blue Grass Boys.

Fourth session: November 23, 1962

With only eight tracks finished at the original three sessions for the album, Monroe and his band returned to the studio on November 23, 1962, to finish work on Bluegrass Special. In the months since the last session, Decca had released Monroe's fourth studio album Bluegrass Ramble (in June), RCA Camden had issued The Father of Bluegrass Music, a compilation of tracks from the Blue Grass Boys' first two sessions in 1940 and 1941 (in August), and Decca had responded with their own compilation of tracks from the 1950s, My All Time Country Favorites (in October). The lineup of the Blue Grass Boys had also changed several times, with Monroe and Mauldin now joined by Lonnie Hoppers on banjo and returning member Kenny Baker on fiddle, with Jimmy Maynard and Joe Stuart alternating guitar duties as temporary stand-ins.

The first recording made on November 23 was of "Careless Love", a folk song recorded by numerous country and blues artists over the years. Baker has recalled that his playing on the track was inspired by the piano performance of Nat King Cole in the 1958 film St. Louis Blues. The second track recorded was Monroe's fourth recording of a Hank Williams song, this time the 1949 single "I'm So Lonesome I Could Cry". The third and final recording from the session was "Jimmy Brown the Newsboy", a Carter Family track recently recorded by former Blue Grass Boys members Mac Wiseman and Flatt and Scruggs. This was not included on the album, instead issued as a single in 1965.

Fifth session: December 6, 1962

With two more songs needed to fill the 12-track album, the band returned to the studio on December 6. Both songs tracked at this final session for Bluegrass Special were instrumentals credited to Monroe and Baker: "Big Sandy River" and "Baker's Breakdown". Neither song had been performed live before. A third song featuring vocals by Monroe, "Darling Corey", was also recorded, although this was not included on the album and was issued as a single in 1964.

== Release ==
Prior to the release of Bluegrass Special, opening track "Blue Ridge Mountain Blues" was issued as a single on January 14, 1963, backed with "How Will I Explain About You". This was followed on April 29 by "Big Sandy River" backed with "There Was Nothing We Could Do". Decca released the album on June 17, 1963.

== Reception ==
Bluegrass Special received a positive review in Billboard magazine, who wrote that "The man who made bluegrass music what it is today, Bill Monroe, has turned out another fine album, spotlighting his own vocals, plus solid instrumental work from his Blue Grass Boys. The songs include both new and old favorites". In the summer of 1964, the album also reached the top 20 of both the Cash Box magazine Top Country Albums chart (peaking at number 18), and the Record World magazine Top Country LP's chart (peaking at number 14).

== Track listing ==
Bluegrass Special track listing
No.	Title	Writer(s)	Length
1.	"Blue Ridge Mountain Blues" (recorded May 3, 1962)	Cliff Hess	2:32
2.	"Columbus Stockade Blues" (recorded April 26, 1962)	Traditional	3:05
3.	"There Was Nothing We Could Do" (recorded April 25, 1962)	Chuck Garson	2:32
4.	"I Was Left on the Street" (recorded April 25, 1962)	Garson; Bill Monroe	2:42
5.	"Big Sandy River" (recorded December 6, 1962)	Monroe; Kenny Baker	2:20
6.	"Cheap Love Affair" (recorded April 25, 1962)	Garson; Monroe	2:44
7.	"How Will I Explain About You" (recorded May 3, 1962)	Monroe	2:33
8.	"Foggy River" (recorded May 3, 1962)	Fred Rose	2:16
9.	"Careless Love" (recorded November 23, 1962)	Traditional	2:38
10.	"I'm So Lonesome I Could Cry" (recorded November 23, 1962)	Hank Williams	2:09
11.	"Baker's Breakdown" (recorded December 6, 1962)	Monroe; Baker	2:10
12.	"When the Bees Are in the Hive" (recorded April 26, 1962)	Alfred Bryan; Kerry Mills	2:09
Total length:			29:50

== Personnel ==
Tracks 1–4, 6–8 and 12 (recorded in April and May 1962)

- Bill Monroe — mandolin, vocals (lead on tracks 2, 4, 6, 7 and 12; tenor on all except track 12)
- Frank Buchanan — guitar, lead vocals (all except track 12)
- Tony Ellis — banjo
- Horace "Benny" Williams — fiddle
- Harold "Red" Stanley — fiddle
- Bessie Lee Mauldin — string bass

Tracks 5, 9, 10 and 11 (recorded in November and December 1962)

- Bill Monroe — mandolin, vocals (tracks 9 and 10)
- Joe Stuart — guitar
- Lonnie Hoppers — banjo
- Kenny Baker — fiddle
- Bessie Lee Mauldin — string bass

== Bibliography ==
- Ewing, Tom (September 7, 2018), Bill Monroe: The Life and Music of the Blue Grass Man (Music in American Life), Champaign, Illinois: University of Illinois Press, ISBN 978-0252041891
