= I Saw the Light (Bill Monroe album) =

Studio album by Bill Monroe and his Blue Grass Boys
- Released: August 11, 1958
- Recorded: February–March 1958
- Studio: Bradley Film & Recording Studio (Nashville, Tennessee)
- Genre: Bluegrass; gospel
- Length: 30:54
- Label: Decca
- Producer: Owen Bradley

Bill Monroe chronology
Knee Deep in Blue Grass (1958)	I Saw the Light (1958)	The Great Bill Monroe and his Blue Grass Boys (1961)

Singles from I Saw the Light
- 1. "Precious Memories" Released: June 20, 1960

I Saw the Light is the second studio album and first gospel album by American bluegrass musician Bill Monroe and his band, the Blue Grass Boys. Released on August 11, 1958, by Decca Records, it features 12 songs recorded across four sessions at Bradley Film & Recording Studio in Nashville, Tennessee during February and March 1958, produced by Owen Bradley. "Precious Memories" was released as the sole single from the album, backed with "Jesus Hold My Hand", on June 20, 1960.

== Background ==
Like many country music artists, Bill Monroe had been performing and recording religious music for many years, both with his band the Blue Grass Boys and earlier as part of the Monroe Brothers duo with brother Charlie. In a column for the California Bluegrass Association, Bert Daniels claimed that "Bill's big break in the music business came from singing gospel music with his brother Charlie", and reported that around one-eighth of Monroe's own compositions registered with Broadcast Music, Inc. were "gospel tunes". The idea for Monroe to record a gospel album was introduced by Owen Bradley, who had taken over as his record producer at the beginning of 1958 after Paul Cohen had moved to Decca Records subsidiary Coral, with the plan to release the album around the same time as his debut, Knee Deep in Blue Grass.

== Recording ==
Blue Grass Boys fiddler Kenny Baker performed baritone vocals on I Saw the Light.

For the recording of his first gospel album, Monroe enlisted former Blue Grass Boys member Edd Mayfield as his new guitarist and lead vocalist in mid-February 1958, offering him and his family a house rent-free in return. In later years, Monroe described Mayfield as "a wonderful guitar man and a wonderful singer ... as good as I ever had". Similarly, future Blue Grass Boys member and Monroe biographer Tom Ewing claimed that he was "then one of only a few lead singer-guitarists capable of successfully recording an album of gospel songs with Bill, particularly one using the accompaniment of just mandolin and guitar".

Recording for I Saw the Light was completed over the course of four sessions, each of which spawned three completed tracks, on February 25 and March 19, 20 and 21, 1958. With instrumental accompaniment of just mandolin, guitar and bass (the latter by regular band member Bessie Lee Mauldin), Mayfield (lead) and Monroe (tenor) performed in a traditional vocal quartet with Blue Grass Boys fiddler Kenny Baker on baritone vocals, plus former fiddler Gordon Terry (at the first session) and former Jordanaires member Culley Holt (at later sessions) on bass vocals. Producer Owen Bradley performed organ on four tracks over two sessions.

I Saw the Light would ultimately mark the final recordings of Edd Mayfield, who died on July 7, 1958, at the age of 32 of leukemia after becoming ill just a few days earlier while touring with Monroe and the Blue Grass Boys. When asked in the early 1980s about Mayfield's contribution to the album and the band, Monroe reflected that "He played a great part in bluegrass when he came in there with me. He was wonderful in the quartet and our duets together. Yes, sir, I thought a lot of Edd, he was great on that quartet album, I Saw The Light."

== Release ==
I Saw the Light was released by Decca on August 11, 1958 — less than two months after Monroe's debut, Knee Deep in Blue Grass. The album's title was taken from its opening track, "I Saw the Light", which was written and recorded by Hank Williams in the 1940s and had recently been included on a posthumous album of the same name. The album was credited solely to "Bill Monroe" and did not list any of the Blue Grass Boys or other performers on the sleeve. As had happened with Knee Deep in Blue Grass, Decca also issued a four-track extended play on the same day as the album, which featured the songs "Life's Railway to Heaven" (written by Charles Davis Tillman), "Precious Memories" (a hymn credited to J. B. F. Wright), "I've Found a Hiding Place" and "Jesus Hold My Hand" (both written by Albert E. Brumley). "Precious Memories" was issued as the only single from the album almost two years later on June 20, 1960, backed with "Jesus Hold My Hand".

== Track listing ==
I Saw the Light track listing
No.	Title	Writer(s)	Length
1.	"I Saw the Light" (recorded February 25, 1958)	Hank Williams	2:27
2.	"I'll Meet You in the Morning" (recorded March 19, 1958)	Albert E. Brumley	2:10
3.	"Life's Railway to Heaven" (recorded March 19, 1958)	Charles Davis Tillman	2:42
4.	"Lord, Lead Me On" (recorded February 25, 1958)	Kenneth Tuttle	2:30
5.	"Wayfaring Stranger" (recorded March 21, 1958)	Traditional	3:03
6.	"A Beautiful Life" (recorded March 21, 1958)	William Golden	2:26
7.	"Precious Memories" (recorded March 19, 1958)	J. B. F. Wright	3:10
8.	"House of Gold" (recorded March 21, 1958)	Williams	2:08
9.	"I've Found a Hiding Place" (recorded March 20, 1958)	Brumley	3:23
10.	"Jesus Hold My Hand" (recorded March 20, 1958)	Brumley	2:20
11.	"I Am a Pilgrim" (recorded March 20, 1958)	Traditional, arr. Merle Travis	2:33
12.	"Lord, Build Me a Cabin in Glory" (recorded February 25, 1958)	Curtis Stewart	2:02
Total length:			30:54

== Personnel ==
- Bill Monroe — mandolin, vocals (lead on tracks 3, 5, 8, 9, and 11; tenor on others)
- Edd Mayfield — guitar, vocals (lead on all except tracks 8 and 11; tenor on tracks 5 and 11)
- Kenny Baker — baritone vocals (all except track 8)
- Gordon Terry — bass vocals (tracks 1, 4 and 12)
- Culley Holt — bass vocals (tracks 2, 3, 5–7 and 9–11)
- Bessie Lee Mauldin — string bass
- Owen Bradley — organ (tracks 3, 5, 7 and 8)

== Bibliography ==
- Ewing, Tom (September 7, 2018), Bill Monroe: The Life and Music of the Blue Grass Man (Music in American Life), Champaign, Illinois: University of Illinois Press, ISBN 978-0252041891
