= Bluegrass fiddle =

Style of American fiddle playing

Bluegrass fiddling is a distinctive style of American fiddle playing which is characterized by bold, bluesy improvisation, off-beat "chopping", and sophisticated use of both double-stops and old-time bowing patterns.

== The beginnings of bluegrass music ==
In the 1940s Bill Monroe and his Bluegrass Boys revolutionized American string band music by incorporating virtuosic instrumental solos and a “high lonesome" vocal style. Bluegrass fiddling was first exposed to national view during the folk revival of the 1960s with the first televised documentary Bluegrass Roots: On The Road With Bluegrass Musicians shot in the Mountain of North Carolina by Bascom Lunsford while auditioning musicians for the Asheville Mountain Music Festival. It was the festival to feature this type of music.

In recent years events have brought renewed interest in bluegrass fiddling: major mainstream performers have recorded bluegrass albums, and the Coen Brothers' released the movie O Brother, Where Art Thou? in (2000), with an old-time and bluegrass soundtrack, and the Down from the Mountain music tour.

== Development of the bluegrass fiddling style ==
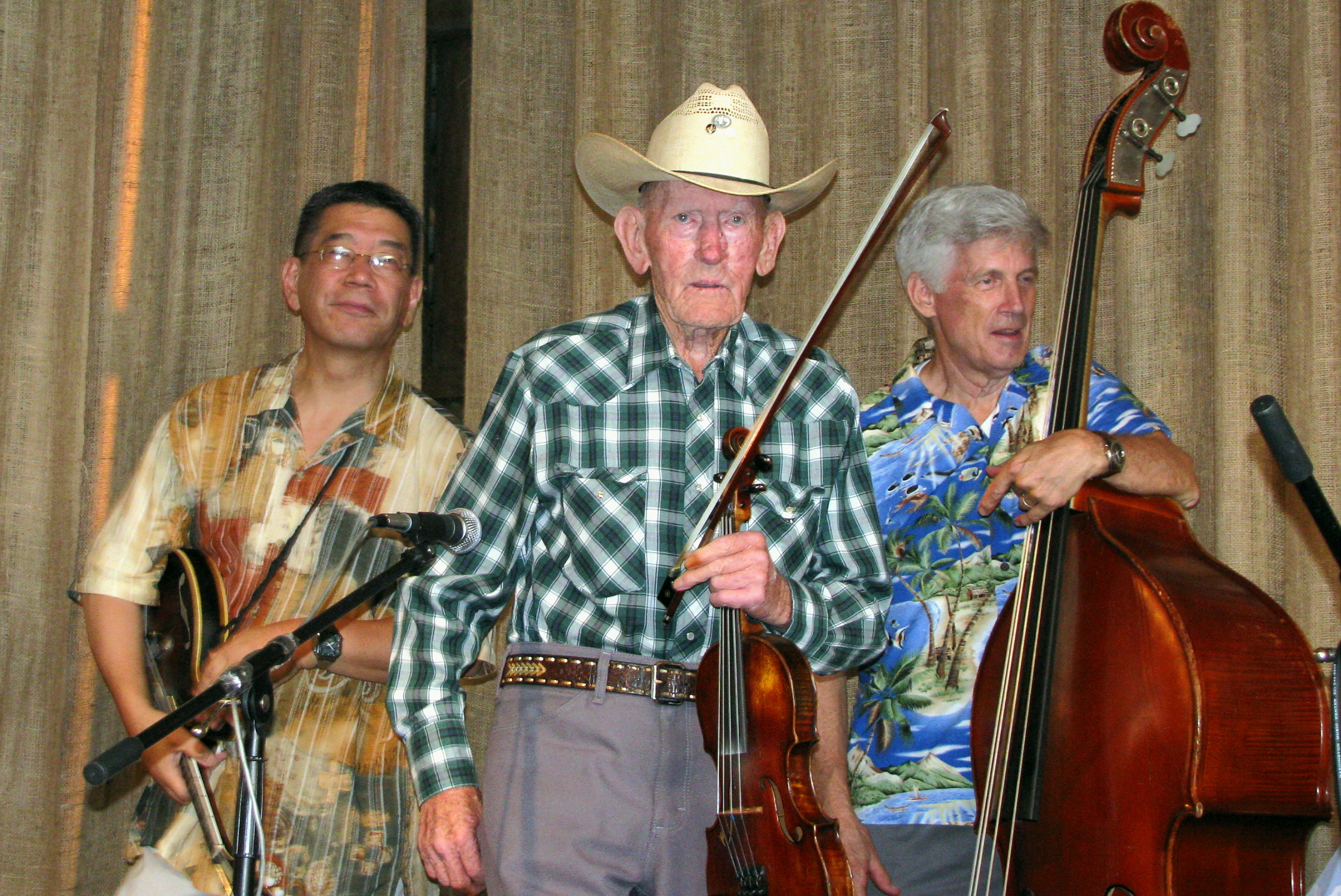
Fiddler Kenny Baker

Kenny Baker is perhaps the most famed early bluegrass fiddler; he met Bill Monroe and cut a record with the Bluegrass Boys in 1957. Kenny Baker served more years in Monroe's band than any other musician and was selected by Monroe to record the fiddle tunes passed down from Uncle Pen Vandiver. Baker and Monroe composed many of the now classic bluegrass fiddle tunes, leading the way in the development of the bluegrass fiddling style. After leaving the Bluegrass Boys in 1984, Baker played with a group of friends, Bob Black, Alan Murphy, and Aleta Murphy.

== Distinctives of the style ==
=== Purists ===
In "Why Old Time is Different from Bluegrass", Allan Feldman argues against the proposal of an "inclusive cover name that would bring oldtime music, bluegrass, clawgrass and dawg music under the same umbrella in order to attract new audiences. The unfortunate trend in this country is to homogenize things. I think old time music stands against homogenization. Having thus staked ground out for himself as a purist, he continues that "he for one celebrates the fact that oldtime music is not bluegrass or dawg music or new grass or even claw grass". Nevertheless, old time influence is strong, even reflected in lyrics such as the reference to old time, actually Scottish/Irish "Soldier's Joy", in "Uncle Pen".

=== Techniques ===
Bluegrass fiddlers combine from many genres and tend to be highly skilled with strong roots in fiddle rather than violinistic traditions. As such, they can be seen to disregard the rules that violinists follow: they hold the fiddle the "wrong" way and don't necessarily use the chin rests, shoulder rests. Kenny Baker is famous for a "long-bow" style which is reputed to add a smoothness and clarity to the music. Notes are often slid into, a technique seldom used by Celtic-influenced stylists outside of bluegrass. Double stops and open tunings are used, as is the full panoply of technique from jazz players such as Stuff Smith and Joe Venuti, and the Western swing technique of players such as Bob Wills.

== Repertoire ==
Famous songs from bluegrass roots include "Ground Hog", "Legend of the Johnson Boys", "East Virginia Blues", "Blue Ridge Mountain Blues", and "Heaven's Light is Shining on Me". "Orange Blossom Special" is often performed by bluegrass fiddlers. See also:

- "Rocky Top"
- "Blue Moon of Kentucky"
- "Uncle Pen"

== See also ==
- List of fiddlers § bluegrass

== Bibliography ==
- Vassar Clements - Fiddle: Bluegrass Masters Series, Matt Glaser (Editor)
- Kingsbury, Paul (2004). The Encyclopedia of Country Music: The Ultimate Guide to the Music. Oxford University Press. ISBN 0-19-517608-1.
- Rosenberg, Neil (1985). Bluegrass: A History. University of Illinois Press. ISBN 0-252-00265-2.
