= The Weary Traveler =

Studio album by Bill Monroe and his Blue Grass Boys
- Released: January 5, 1976
- Recorded: March 10–12, 1975
- Studio: Bradley's Barn (Mount Juliet, Tennessee)
- Genre: Bluegrass; gospel
- Length: 27:43
- Label: MCA
- Producer: Walter Haynes

Bill Monroe chronology
Bill Monroe and his Blue Grass Boys Vol. II (1950–1972) (1975)	The Weary Traveler (1976)	Bill Monroe Sings Bluegrass, Body and Soul (1977)

The Weary Traveler is the 11th studio album by American bluegrass musician Bill Monroe and his band, the Blue Grass Boys. Released by MCA Records on January 5, 1976, it features ten songs recorded over three sessions at Bradley's Barn in Mount Juliet, Tennessee on March 10, 11 and 12, 1975. The album was produced by Walter Haynes and is Monroe's first since 1961's Mr. Blue Grass to have been recorded by a single lineup of the Blue Grass Boys.

== Background ==
By early 1975, it had been nearly three years since Bill Monroe had recorded new material — his longest absence from the studio since 1941–1945, when he was prevented from recording due to the 1942–1944 musicians' strike. His last sessions, in March 1972, had made up his first official collaboration album with son James, Father & Son, which was released on March 1, 1973. In the meantime, MCA Records had collated previously unreleased material from as early as 1957 and as recently as 1970 to make up Monroe's tenth studio album, Road of Life, which they released on November 4, 1974. Consequently, the sessions which made up The Weary Traveler marked the recording debuts of guitarist Ralph Lewis, banjo player Bob Black and bassist Randy Davis, all of whom had joined the Blue Grass Boys in the summer of 1974.

== Recording ==
At the first recording session for The Weary Traveler on March 10, 1975, Monroe and the Blue Grass Boys recorded four songs. The first was religious track "Clinging to a Saving Hand", written by Bill Mack and originally recorded by Connie Smith in 1970. The second was another religious composition — "Show Me the Way", written by Monroe's collaborator Virginia Stauffer — which featured the vocal trio of lead Ralph Lewis, tenor Monroe and baritone Randy Davis. The third and fourth tracks were both instrumentals written by Monroe: "Jerusalem Ridge" (written in 1973) and "Ashland Breakdown" (written in 1971).

The second session, held the next evening, saw the group record another four tracks. The first, Monroe's own "Mary Jane, Won't You Be Mine", featured the same vocal trio as "Show Me the Way". The second track recorded was R. E. Winsett's "Farther On", reportedly "one of [Monroe's] favorite gospel solos", although it was rejected for inclusion on the album. Following this was a re-recording of Hal Bynum and George Jones' "There's an Old, Old House", which Monroe had originally recorded in 1965 as a B-side, and another original instrumental, "Watson Blues", on which Joe Stuart switched from fiddle to guitar.

The third and final consecutive session produced the final three songs released on the album. The first song tracked was "Thank God for Kentucky", the third and final vocal trio track for the record. Songwriter Hazel Smith had to teach the band in the studio, although guitarist Ralph Lewis had to come up with new music for the recording, as she was originally singing it to the tune of "My Old Kentucky and You". This was followed by recordings of Juanita Southern's "Reasons Why" and the title track "Weary Traveler", which Monroe recalled he bought from writer Cliff Carlisle for five dollars.

== Release ==
The Weary Traveler was released by MCA Records on January 5, 1976. No songs from the album were released as singles.

== Reception ==
The Weary Traveler received generally positive reviews from music critics. Cash Box magazine called it "a bluegrass masterpiece", while the Walrus progressive music newsletter wrote that "Monroe is one of the few artists of such consistent quality that reviews of his albums are almost interchangeable. His music never sinks below very good." Bill C. Malone of Country Music magazine, however, was more conflicted. He claimed that "Some of the songs [on the album] sound too similar to ones [Monroe] has done in the past", but noted that even though not all the tracks are "wholly original", they do "demonstrate [Monroe's] remarkable ability to create fresh and exciting sounds within the framework of tradition". In 1987, Hazel Smith named The Weary Traveler as her ninth favorite album from the last 15 years.

== Track listing ==
The Weary Traveler track listing
No.	Title	Writer(s)	Length
1.	"Mary Jane, Won't You Be Mine" (recorded March 11, 1975)	Bill Monroe	1:55
2.	"Old, Old House" (recorded March 11, 1975)	Hal Bynum; George Jones	2:30
3.	"Jerusalem Ridge" (recorded March 10, 1975)	Monroe	2:36
4.	"Clinging to a Saving Hand" (recorded March 10, 1975)	Bill Mack	2:20
5.	"Thank God for Kentucky" (recorded March 12, 1975)	Hazel Smith	2:40
6.	"Show Me the Way" (recorded March 10, 1975)	Virginia Stauffer	2:31
7.	"Weary Traveler" (recorded March 12, 1975)	Cliff Carlisle; Bobby Gregory	3:19
8.	"Ashland Breakdown" (recorded March 10, 1975)	Monroe	2:16
9.	"Reasons Why" (recorded March 12, 1975)	Juanita Southern	2:10
10.	"Watson Blues" (recorded March 11, 1975)	Monroe	4:27
Total length:			27:43

== Personnel ==
- Bill Monroe — mandolin, vocals (lead on all except tracks 3, 8 and 10; tenor on tracks 1, 5 and 6)
- Ralph Lewis — guitar (all except track 10), lead vocals (tracks 1, 5 and 6)
- James Monroe — guitar
- Bob Black — banjo
- Kenny Baker — fiddle
- Joe Stuart — fiddle (all except track 10), guitar (track 10)
- Randy Davis — string bass, baritone vocals (tracks 1, 5 and 6)

== Bibliography ==
- Ewing, Tom (September 7, 2018), Bill Monroe: The Life and Music of the Blue Grass Man (Music in American Life), Champaign, Illinois: University of Illinois Press, ISBN 978-0252041891
- Rosenberg, Neil V.; Wolfe, Charles K. (June 7, 2007), The Music of Bill Monroe: Music in American Life, Champaign, Illinois: University of Illinois Press, ISBN 978-0252031212
