= A Voice from on High =

Compilation album by Bill Monroe and his Blue Grass Boys
- Released: June 30, 1969
- Recorded: 1950–1955
- Genre: Bluegrass; gospel
- Length: 27:31
- Label: Decca
- Producer: Paul Cohen

Bill Monroe chronology
Bill Monroe and Charlie Monroe (1969)	A Voice from on High (1969)	Kentucky Blue Grass (1970)

A Voice from on High is the tenth compilation album and first compilation of entirely gospel songs by American bluegrass musician Bill Monroe and his band, the Blue Grass Boys. Released by Decca Records on June 30, 1969, it features eleven songs recorded for the label between 1950 and 1955, ten of which were previously released as singles or B-sides. The sole unreleased track is a 1952 recording of Monroe and Pete Pyle's "Don't Put Off 'Til Tomorrow".

== Background ==
According to Bill Monroe's manager Ralph Rinzler's liner notes to A Voice from on High, efforts were being made to arrange for a reissue of Monroe's 1950s gospel recordings as early as 1964. In early 1968, Rinzler and Monroe's producer Harry Silverstein discussed the idea for the album with Decca Records, but the label instead chose to issue another compilation of secular recordings following a string of successful releases of a similar nature — this came out that June as Bill Monroe's Greatest Hits, an album which almost entirely (save for three tracks) replicated the track listing of an earlier release, 1962's My All Time Country Favorites.

A year after Greatest Hits, Decca released A Voice from on High on June 30, 1969. Ten of the eleven tracks featured on the album had been originally released as singles or B-sides; the sole previously unreleased track was a recording of the Monroe and Pete Pyle original "Don't Put Off 'Til Tomorrow" from 1952 featuring Jimmy Martin, Sonny Osborne, Charlie Cline and Ernie Newton. Speaking about the delayed release of the song in the liner notes, Rinzler informed listeners about the five-year delay, and quoted an interview he conducted with Monroe in which the bandleader stated that "It's really a good song and I'm glad they're going to release it."

The title of the album was taken from the song of the same name, written by Monroe with future bassist Bessie Lee Mauldin and recorded as the B-side to "I'm Working on a Building" on January 14, 1954. Prior to this, Monroe "gifted" the song to The Stanley Brothers in September 1953 to celebrate the duo signing with Mercury Records; they recorded the song on November 25 that year and released it as a B-side early the next year.

== Track listing ==
A Voice from On High track listing
No.	Title	Writer(s)	Original release	Length
1.	"Let the Light Shine Down on Me" (recorded January 28, 1955)	Dot Swan	"Wait a Little Longer, Please Jesus" B-side (1955)	1:55
2.	"Lord Protect My Soul" (recorded October 15, 1950)	Bill Monroe	single A-side (1951)	2:30
3.	"Wait a Little Longer, Please Jesus" (recorded January 28, 1955)	Hazel Houser	single A-side (1955)	2:34
4.	"A Voice from on High" (recorded January 14, 1954)	Monroe; Bessie Lee Mauldin	"I'm Working on a Building" B-side (1954)	2:34
5.	"I'm Working on a Building" (recorded January 14, 1954)	A. P. Carter	single A-side (1954)	2:41
6.	"Don't Put Off 'Til Tomorrow" (recorded July 18, 1952)	Monroe; Pete Pyle	previously unreleased	2:33
7.	"He Will Set Your Fields Afire" (recorded January 14, 1954)	Wilbur Jones	"Happy on My Way" B-side (1954)	2:38
8.	"Get Down on Your Knees and Pray" (recorded July 6, 1951)	Monroe	"I'll Meet You in Church Sunday Morning" B-side (1951)	2:58
9.	"Boat of Love" (recorded April 8, 1950)	James W. Smith	single A-side (1950)	2:41
10.	"Walking in Jerusalem Just Like John" (recorded July 18, 1952)	Monroe	single A-side (1953)	1:57
11.	"River of Death" (recorded October 15, 1950)	Monroe	"Lord Protect My Soul" B-side (1951)	2:30
Total length:				27:31

== Personnel ==
- Bill Monroe — mandolin (all except track 10), vocals (lead on tracks 3, 5, 6 and 10; tenor on all except track 6)
- Claude "Jackie" Phelps — guitar and lead vocals (tracks 1 and 3)
- Jimmy Martin — guitar (tracks 2, 4–7 and 9–11), vocals (lead on tracks 2, 4, 5, 7, 9 and 11; tenor on track 10)
- Grady Martin — guitar (tracks 4, 5 and 7)
- Carter Stanley — guitar and lead vocals (track 8)
- Rudy Lyle — banjo (tracks 4, 5 and 7–9), baritone vocals (tracks 2, 8 and 11)
- Sonny Osborne — banjo (track 6)
- Charlie Cline — fiddle (tracks 1 and 3–7), baritone vocals (tracks 1, 3–5, 7 and 10)
- Bobby Hicks — fiddle and bass vocals (tracks 1 and 3)
- Gordon Terry — fiddle and bass vocals (track 8)
- Vassar Clements — fiddle (track 9)
- William "Buddy" Killen — string bass (tracks 1 and 3)
- Ernie Newton — string bass (tracks 4–7 and 10)
- Joel Price — string bass (track 9), vocals (baritone on track 9; bass on tracks 2 and 11)
- Howard "Cedric Rainwater" Watts — string bass (track 8)
- Milton Estes — bass vocals (tracks 5 and 7)
- Birch Monroe — bass vocals (track 9)
- Boudleaux Bryant — bass vocals (track 10)

== Bibliography ==
- Ewing, Tom (September 7, 2018), Bill Monroe: The Life and Music of the Blue Grass Man (Music in American Life), Champaign, Illinois: University of Illinois Press, ISBN 978-0252041891
