= Bluegrass Ramble =

Studio album by Bill Monroe and his Blue Grass Boys
- Released: June 11, 1962
- Recorded: November–December 1961
- Studio: Bradley Film & Recording Studio (Nashville, Tennessee)
- Genre: Bluegrass
- Length: 29:06
- Label: Decca
- Producer: Owen Bradley

Bill Monroe chronology
Mr. Blue Grass (1961)	Bluegrass Ramble (1962)	The Father of Bluegrass Music (1962)

Singles from Bluegrass Ramble
- 1. "Toy Heart" Released: July 2, 1962

Bluegrass Ramble is the fourth studio album by American bluegrass musician Bill Monroe and his band, the Blue Grass Boys. Released on June 11, 1962, by Decca Records, it features 12 songs recorded across four sessions at Bradley Film & Recording Studio in Nashville, Tennessee during November and December 1961, produced by Owen Bradley. One song from the album was released as a single: the Monroe-written "Toy Heart" on July 2, 1962.

== Background ==
With the continued momentum of the American folk music revival providing an uplift in popularity for bluegrass music, Bill Monroe and the Blue Grass Boys found their touring schedule "as busy as it had been in the early 1950s" by the spring of 1961. As a result, songs for the upcoming follow-up to Mr. Blue Grass were chosen based on "appealing to folk music fans", with Monroe favoring tracks he'd performed since as early as the 1930s. By the time they came to record in early-November, the lineup of the Blue Grass Boys included returning guitarist Jimmy Maynard and former stand-in Curtis McPeake on banjo, who had recently replaced the outgoing Bobby Smith and Bobby Atkins, respectively. Fiddler Vassar Clements (on his third tenure) and long-time bassist Bessie Lee Mauldin completed the band's lineup.

== Recording ==
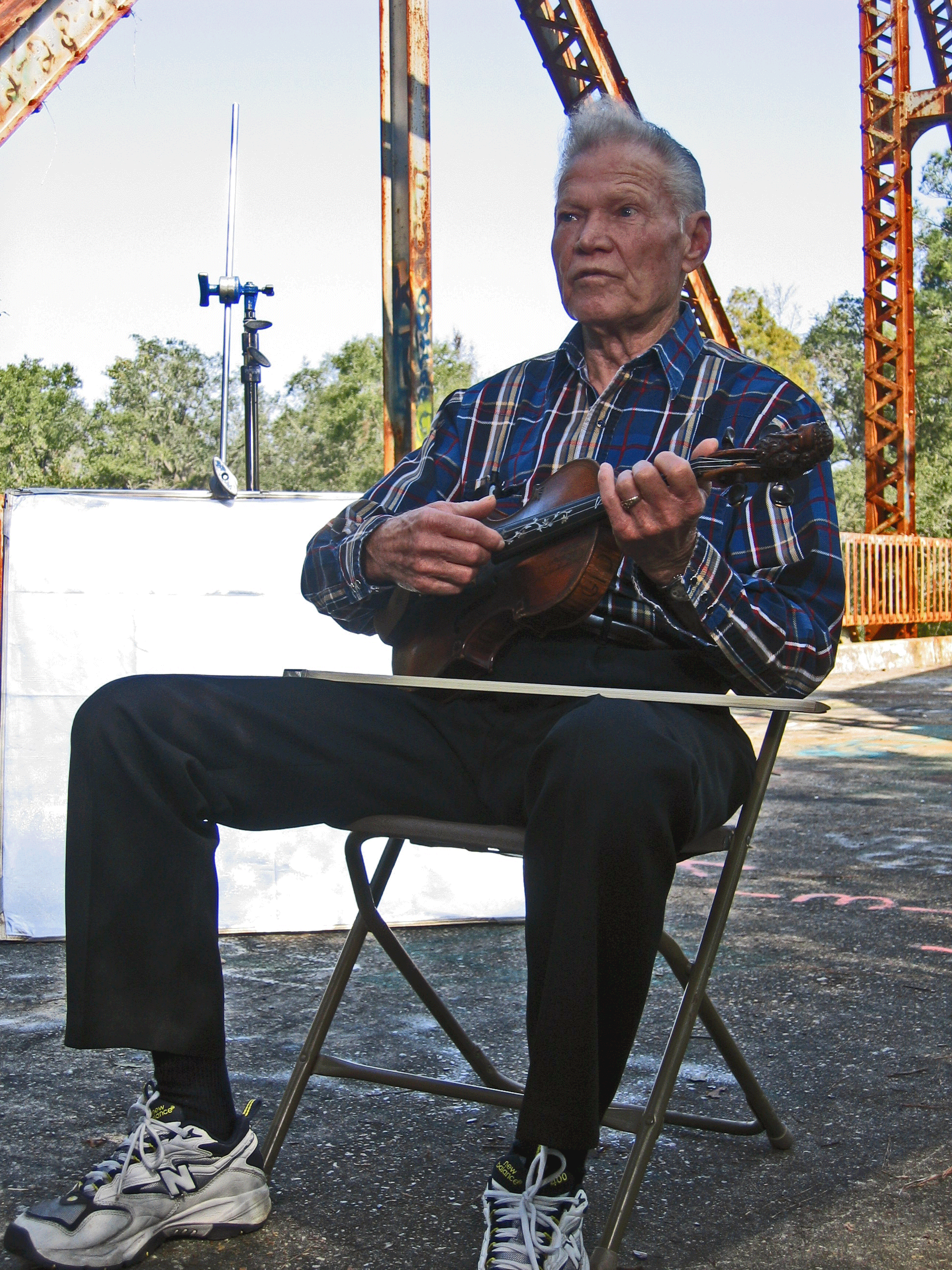
Vassar Clements played lead fiddle at the first session for Bluegrass Ramble.

First and second sessions: November 9 and 10, 1961

The first recording session for Bill Monroe's fourth album took place on November 9, 1961, and featured Buddy Spicher joining Clements on fiddle. The first song recorded was the folk standard "Little Maggie", which Monroe had been performing as early as 1946 but had not yet recorded. Many artists had recorded the track since the late-1920s, most notably in bluegrass The Stanley Brothers in 1948. The other two songs recorded at this session were both re-recordings of Monroe tracks originally released in 1949: "I'm Going Back to Old Kentucky", originally issued as a single, and "Toy Heart", originally released as the B-side to "Blue Grass Breakdown". The next session took place the next day and introduced new band member Benny Williams, who was the sole fiddler for the day. Recorded on November 10 were standards "Shady Grove" and "Nine Pound Hammer", followed by "Live and Let Live", originally by Wiley Walker and Gene Sullivan.

Third and fourth sessions: November 30 and December 4, 1961

The third session for Bluegrass Ramble took place on November 30, 1961 — the day after Monroe and his Blue Grass Boys performed at Carnegie Hall in New York. Monroe had planned to enlist Tony Ellis to play banjo at the show, but the paperwork was completed before he arrived, listing regular member Curtis McPeake in the lineup; to make it up to Ellis, Monroe asked him and fiddler Bobby Joe Lester (who Ellis had brought with him) to perform at the following day's recording session. The rest of the lineup included Spicher and Mauldin, with Williams switching to guitar to cover for Jimmy Maynard (who was travelling back by car with McPeake).

The first song recorded on November 30 was "Danny Boy", a popular song which had recently been in the Billboard charts on several occasions in the form of recordings by Conway Twitty and Andy Williams. This was followed by "Cotton Fields", which featured additional vocals by Williams and Lester, and finally "Journey's End". Maynard was back in time to perform at the final session on December 4, for which Lester was the sole fiddler. The session saw the group recording three instrumentals to fill out the remaining tracks on the album: standards "John Hardy" and "Old Joe Clark", plus Elmer Schoebel, Billy Meyers and Jack Pettis' "Bugle Call Rag". All three tracks were chosen by Monroe based on hearing Ellis play them on banjo.

== Release ==
Bluegrass Ramble was released by Decca Records on June 11, 1962. No single was issued prior to the album, however "Toy Heart" (backed with "Danny Boy") was released at the beginning of July. No extended play was released in conjunction with the album, although "John Hardy" was featured on a release with three tracks from Mr. Blue Grass issued in October 1962.

== Reception ==
Media response to Bluegrass Ramble was positive. Billboard magazine selected it as one of its "Special Merit Albums" in the week of its release, writing that "Bluegrass fans, city or country, will enjoy this sparkling new album from the king of bluegrass ... The songs spotlight exciting instrumental work that makes the Blue Grass Boys outstanding entertainers". A review published in the British magazine New Record Mirror stated that "This new album, more than any other Monroe production, is really illustrative of his talent for country entertainment", praising the band's performance but also noting that "the result is less purist, perhaps less 'authentic', but certainly more enjoyable to a wider and less discerning market of record buyers". Upon its release as a single, Billboard specifically praised "Toy Heart" as a "happy tune" and a "bright side".

== Track listing ==
Bluegrass Ramble track listing
No.	Title	Writer(s)	Length
1.	"Little Maggie" (recorded November 9, 1961)	Traditional	2:31
2.	"Bugle Call Rag" (recorded December 4, 1961)	Elmer Schoebel; Billy Meyers; Jack Pettis	2:37
3.	"Toy Heart" (recorded November 9, 1961)	Bill Monroe	2:14
4.	"I'm Going Back to Old Kentucky" (recorded November 9, 1961)	Monroe	2:22
5.	"Live and Let Live" (recorded November 10, 1961)	Wiley Walker; Gene Sullivan	2:36
6.	"Nine Pound Hammer" (recorded November 10, 1961)	Traditional	2:14
7.	"Cotton Fields" (recorded November 30, 1961)	Huddie Ledbetter	2:31
8.	"John Hardy" (recorded December 4, 1961)	Traditional	2:40
9.	"Shady Grove" (recorded November 10, 1961)	Traditional	1:42
10.	"Danny Boy" (recorded November 30, 1961)	Frederic Weatherly	2:36
11.	"Journey's End" (recorded November 30, 1961)	Pappy Stewart; Ernest Tubb	2:42
12.	"Old Joe Clark" (recorded December 4, 1961)	Traditional	2:21
Total length:			29:06

== Personnel ==
Tracks 1, 3 and 4 (recorded November 9, 1961)

- Bill Monroe — mandolin, vocals (lead on all, tenor on track 3 chorus)
- Jimmy Maynard — guitar, vocals (lead on track 3 chorus)
- Curtis McPeake — banjo
- Vassar Clements — fiddle
- Norman "Buddy" Spicher — fiddle
- Bessie Lee Mauldin — string bass

Tracks 5, 6 and 9 (recorded November 10, 1961)

- Bill Monroe — mandolin, vocals (lead on all, tenor on tracks 5 and 9 choruses)
- Jimmy Maynard — guitar, vocals (lead on tracks 5 and 9 choruses)
- Curtis McPeake — banjo
- Horace "Benny" Williams — fiddle, vocals (baritone on track 9 chorus)
- Bessie Lee Mauldin — string bass

Tracks 7, 10 and 11 (recorded November 30, 1961)

- Bill Monroe — mandolin, vocals (lead on all tracks, tenor on track 7 chorus)
- Horace "Benny" Williams — guitar, vocals (lead on track 7 chorus)
- Tony Ellis — banjo
- Bobby Joe Lester — fiddle, vocals (baritone on track 7 chorus)
- Norman "Buddy" Spicher — fiddle
- Bessie Lee Mauldin — string bass

Tracks 2, 8 and 12 (recorded December 4, 1961)

- Bill Monroe — mandolin
- Jimmy Maynard — guitar
- Tony Ellis — banjo
- Bobby Joe Lester — fiddle
- Bessie Lee Mauldin — string bass

== Bibliography ==
- Ewing, Tom (September 7, 2018), Bill Monroe: The Life and Music of the Blue Grass Man (Music in American Life), Champaign, Illinois: University of Illinois Press, ISBN 978-0252041891
