= I'm Working on a Building =

"I'm Working on a Building" is a song in both the African American spiritual and southern gospel traditions. The song has become a standard of the genres. It has been recorded many times, by artists such as The Carter Family, Bill Monroe, Elvis Presley, the Oak Ridge Boys, B. B. King, John Fogerty, The Seldom Scene, and Theo Lawrence.

== History ==
One version of the song is credited to Lillian Bowles and Winifred O. Hoyle, though it existed as a traditional folk song for longer than that, likely a negro spiritual of indeterminate origin. An early version of the song was collected in a 1929 book, Old Songs Hymnal by Dorothy G. Bolton; the song is described as having a calypso feel to it, leading to speculation that it may have originated in Florida or the Caribbean.

The song became popularly associated with Southern gospel music when The Carter Family recorded it in 1934 for Bluebird Records; this version is copyrighted to A. P. Carter. Bill Monroe, the father of bluegrass music, added it to his regular set-list due to numerous requests from fans, and because he appreciated the construction metaphor in the song's lyrics. It is believed that the Carter version was itself based on a much older version which the folklorist John Wesley Work III later included in his 1940 collection American Negro Songs and Spirituals.

Blues legend B. B. King first learned the song as a young street musician, and it became a regular part of his repertoire during his early career. John Fogerty included the song in his first solo project, The Blue Ridge Rangers.
