= Merle Taylor =

American musician (1927–1987)

Merle "Red" Taylor (May 19, 1927 - May 3, 1987) was an American musician.

== Early life ==
Taylor was born in Saltillo, Mississippi. Taylor began playing his fiddle at an early age and was asked to play at several local events growing up. At the age of fifteen, he got his own first show in Tupelo, Mississippi. Later on, he moved to Nashville, Tennessee to start his career in music.

== Career ==
Taylor then took a break from music and joined the military, but eventually moved back to Nashville and got to perform at the Grand Ole Opry. Merle was also one of Bill Monroe's fiddlers and helped contribute to the start of bluegrass music. Monroe took interest in Merle "Red" Taylor when he composed an ear-catching melody. Monroe liked the way it sounded, and by his next recording session on October 15, 1950, he set words to Taylor's tune. He made it his own and as a tribute to "Uncle Pen." It became one of his most requested songs, and Taylor remained uncredited. Red impressed hundreds of fiddlers with the bowing technique he used. As Gordon Terry, the man who placed him as a fiddle player in Monro's band, explained, "He did a slow bow with a lot of finger work and a funner reverse...I don't think there would be the tunes there are now, had he not played fiddle because he did something nobody did." Merle "Red" Taylor played with Paul Howard, Cowboy Copas, and Hank Williams in addition to Monroe's Blue Grass Boys.
