= Soldier's Joy (fiddle tune) =

Scottish and American tune

Soldier's Joy, performed by the North Carolina Hawaiians (1929).

Soldier's Joy, performed by the Gunnel Hensmar (1951).

"Soldier's Joy" is a fiddle tune, classified as a reel or country dance. It is popular in the American fiddle canon, in which it is touted as "an American classic" but traces its origin to Scottish fiddling traditions. It has been played in Scotland for over 200 years, and Robert Burns used it for the first song of his cantata 'The Jolly Beggars'. According to documentation at the United States Library of Congress, it is "one of the oldest and most widely distributed tunes" and is rated in the top ten most-played old time fiddle tunes. The tune dates as early as the 1760s. In spite of its upbeat tempo and catchy melody, the term "soldier's joy" has a much darker meaning than is portrayed by the tune. This term eventually came to refer to the combination of whiskey, beer, and morphine used by American Civil War soldiers to alleviate pain.

== Melody as basis for song ==
Like many pure tunes with ancient pedigree, the melody of Soldier's Joy has been used as a basis for construction of songs, which, unlike pure tunes, have lyrics. Robert Burns wrote lyrics for the tune in which a dismembered, homeless veteran sarcastically recounts his delight with battle.

=== Civil War era and post-bellum cultural references ===
The tune came to represent substance use to alleviate pain during the Civil War. This is corroborated in concurring secondary sources.

Gimme some of that Soldier's Joy, you know what I mean'
I don't want to hurt no more my leg is turnin' green

The IHIC version is as follows:

Twenty-five cents for whiskey, twenty-five cents for beer
Twenty-five cents for morphine, get me out of here

Chorus:
I'm my momma's pride and joy (3×)
Sing you a song called the soldier's joy

=== Country ===
Twenty-five cents for whiskey, twenty-five cents for beer
Twenty-five cents for morphine get me out of here

Chorus:
I'm my momma's pride and joy (3×)
Sing you a song called the soldier's joy

Grasshopper sitting on a sweet potato vine (3×)
Along come a chicken and he's say "you're mine"
I'm gonna get you there don't you want to go? (3×)
All for the soldier's joy
Chicken in a bread pan scratching that dough
Granny does your dog bite no child no
All for the soldier's joy

== See also ==
- Old-time music
- Skillet Lickers
- Banjo
- Appalachian music
- Sam Stone (song)
