= Gordon Terry =

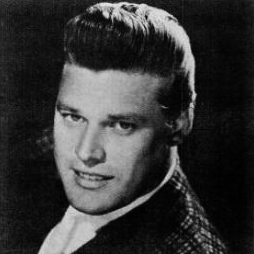
- Gordon Terry in 1969

Background information
- Born: October 7, 1931; Decatur, Alabama
- Died: April 9, 2006 (aged 74) Spring Hill, Tennessee
- Genres: country, bluegrass
- Instruments: fiddle, guitar, vocals
- Formerly of: The Strangers

Gordon Terry (October 7, 1931 – April 9, 2006) was an American bluegrass and country music fiddler and guitarist. He was a member of Merle Haggard's backing band The Strangers. He was inducted into the Alabama Music Hall of Fame and the Fiddlers Hall of Fame.

== Biography ==
Terry was born in Decatur, Alabama and learned to play the fiddle at an early age. He made his first performance on the Grand Ole Opry at age nine. He attended fiddlers' conventions, and won first prize at the Alabama Fiddling Championship in 1946. In 1950, he joined the Grand Ole Opry and within a year, he performed and recorded with Bill Monroe. Terry served in the US Army in Korea. After his discharge, he moved to California, and made his movie debut in Hidden Guns in 1956. He appeared in three other movies and one episode of Sky King.

In 1957, Terry returned for a recording session with Bill Monroe. In the following decades, he recorded with artists such as Johnny Cash, Elvis Presley, Wynn Stewart, Faron Young, Merle Haggard, Jerry Lee Lewis, Neil Young and many more. In November 1961, he recorded a square dance album with Flatt & Scruggs. Terry founded Terrytown, an amusement park in Loretto, Tennessee in 1964, but later sold it. He also founded Reunion Of Professional Entertainers (ROPE), an association with an aim to build a retirement home for entertainers.

In 1981, Terry was inducted as a charter member into the Fiddlers Hall of Fame. In the 1980s, the Gordon Terry Parkway in Decatur was named after him. He died in 2006 in Spring Hill, Tennessee. He was posthumously inducted into The Southern Legends Entertainment & Performing Arts Hall of Fame in 2006.
