= Benny Williams (musician) =

American singer-songwriter (1931–2007)

- Born: Benjamin Horace Williams; March 23, 1931
- Died: October 11, 2007 (aged 76)
- Genres: Bluegrass
- Occupation: Fiddler
- Instrument: Fiddle
- Formerly of: Bill Monroe and the Bluegrass Boys

Benjamin Horace Williams (March 28, 1931 – October 11, 2007) was an American bluegrass musician. A multi-instrumentalist, he sang and played fiddle, guitar, banjo, autoharp, and mandolin.

== Career ==
Williams played fiddle in Bill Monroe's band and with such notables as Mac Wiseman, Reno & Smiley, The Stanley Brothers, Flatt & Scruggs, Grandpa Jones, Jimmy Martin, Kitty Wells & Johnny Wright, Stonewall Jackson, and Marty Robbins. He was a recipient of the IBMA Pioneers of Bluegrass award. Williams appeared playing banjo on The Porter Wagoner Show playing "Foggy Mountain Breakdown". He joined Wagoner's in-house band, the Wagonmasters, as guitarist where he played fingerstyle, with fingerpicks. He started out with Mac Wiseman in Virginia and then joined the Tennessee Cut-Ups. He joined the Bluegrass Boys in 1961, first playing guitar but switched to fiddle. He sang lead vocal on a recording of "Cotton Fields" and played fiddle on numerous tracks in that and the subsequent year. He continued working with Wiseman and playing banjo and mandolin.

== View of colleagues ==
Fellow Blue Grass Boy Doug Hutchens commented,

"Benny was one of the three real utility Blue Grass Boys ... that could and do about anything include work on the bus. The first time I saw him was in the late 60s just before Kenny Baker returned to the band, Benny was playing fiddle with his right hand bandaged where he had got it caught in the fan on the bus the day before. His main instrument was fiddle but could play banjo, bass and guitar as well... Benny was a quiet and unassuming man and preferred to be the sideman and made many a country entertainer's song sound right."

== Discography ==
- Legend of Bill Monroe and More Bluegrass (Benny Williams compilation)
- Bill Monroe – Bluegrass 1959–1969 CD
- Music of Bill Monroe CD (vocals, fiddle)
- Porter Wagoner – Rca Country Legends CD
- Porter Wagoner – Rca Country Legends CD (vocals, guitar)

== Legend of Bill Monroe and More Bluegrass ==
An album titled Legend of Bill Monroe and More Bluegrass was engineered By Bernard Rousseau of the Harriman Sound Lab and made available through Scott Morgan's Morgan Stringed Instruments on CD. Williams enjoyed a long-time collaboration with Scott's father Tom Morgan, himself an IBMA Hall of Fame inductee. On this album, Benny plays fiddle on "Never Again" and "The Legend of Bill Monroe" and banjo on "Soldier's Joy". On other tracks he plays cross pick mandolin and Travis -tyle guitar.

== See also ==
- Bluegrass fiddle
- Traditional bluegrass
