= Buddy Spicher =

American country music fiddle player

- Born: Norman Keith Spicher; July 28, 1938 (age 87); DuBois, Pennsylvania, United States
- Genres: Country
- Occupation: Fiddle Player
- Years active: 1954–present
- Labels: Various
- Website: buddyspicher.com

Buddy Spicher (born Norman Keith Spicher; July 28, 1938 in DuBois, Pennsylvania; pronounced “Spiker”) is an American country music fiddle player. He is a member of The Nashville A-Team of session musicians, and is Grammy-nominated. He was nominated as Instrumentalist of the Year by CMA in 1983 and 1985. He was the first fiddler in the "Nashville Cats" series of the Country Music Hall of Fame (August, 2008). He recorded with virtually every major country star of the sixties, seventies, and early eighties, including Faron Young, Johnny Paycheck Little Jimmy Dickens, Reba McEntire, George Jones, Don Williams, Dolly Parton, Crystal Gayle, Loretta Lynn, Bob Wills, Asleep at the Wheel, Don Francisco (song "He's Alive"), Ray Price, Willie Nelson, George Strait ("Amarillo by Morning"), Bill Monroe, David Allan Coe, and Emmylou Harris.

Versatile, he recorded with Elvis Presley, Gary Burton, Bob Dylan, Joan Baez, The Monkees, Linda Ronstadt ("Long, Long Time"), Ray Charles, Henry Mancini, Dan Fogelberg, The Statler Brothers, The Happy Goodman Family, Neil Young and The Lewis Family.

He is often seen on television and YouTube; he was with the Wilburn Brothers. He is active in session work, fiddle camps, and teaching university courses. He continues to tutor; and produce, write, and arrange songs.

"Since 1958, [when Spicher] played his first Nashville recording session, he has been the most versatile fiddler of all time. From Bluegrass to Classical to Jazz, He has covered it all as a professional; and has been a wonderful inspiration to me. Please make welcome to the stage the great Buddy Spicher" --

During his career of more than fifty years, he has been known for double stops and playing harmony in twin fiddle work.

== Early years ==
Spicher's older brother Bob, a semi-professional guitarist, started as a fiddle player and one day about 1949 showed Spicher how to play "Boil 'em Cabbage Down". He was amazed at how quickly Spicher learned to play it well. Country music pervaded the mountain towns around Dubois. Both uncles on his mother's side played fiddle, and Spicher first chorded on guitar. But fiddle quickly became his passion. By age thirteen, he was playing with local bands on radio station WCED. (He used a fiddle borrowed from his girlfriend's father.) The same year, early employer Dusty Owens was headlining on WWVA Jamboree in Wheeling, West Virginia.

At about age fourteen, Spicher met by chance Clarence "Tater" Tate in Wheeling, WV. Tate, himself a professional sideman, was adept at double stops, and Spicher wanted to learn the technique. He also began hitchhiking to Wheeling, where Bob Spicher was already working as a guitarist.

By age sixteen, Spicher was playing professionally with Dusty Owens on the WWVA Jamboree in Wheeling, WV. In Nashville in the late fifties he was with the backing band for Audrey Williams, the widow of Hank Williams, later with Hank Snow, and the Charles River Valley Boys. He enjoyed touring for several years with Ray Price as fiddler in Price's band, the Cherokee Cowboys. Spicher became a Nashville-based session musician, backing the likes of Bob Dylan. He was also one of the band members of Area Code 615 with other Nashville sessions musicians and Asleep at the Wheel.

== Nashville ==
Literally a starving artist, Spicher inhabited Broadway looking for work. "I would be glad to get a beer somebody would buy me -- for nourishment,"he has said. He earned the respect of players at the Opry, Big Jeff's, and Kitty Wells, Johnnie & Jack, etc. Occasionally he was booked for a session. He worked extensively with Hank Snow. He was hired as a regular on the Wilburn Brothers television show. Slowly he became sought after, and by 1967, working with Tommy Jackson, then Johnny Gimble, and sometimes Grover "Shorty" Lavender, Spicher was an "A-list" fiddle player; it was a position he maintained for more than ten years. Throughout, he was also recording and performing bluegrass, gospel, jazz, classical (he played briefly with the Nashville Symphony) and Western Swing.

He can be heard playing the fiddle (“violin” in the credits on the record jacket) on Christian singer Don Francisco's 1977 album Forgiven. Most of the tracks feature the fiddle, including the Dove-award-winning “He's Alive”.

Session work before the digital age required a band to record as many as five songs in three hours. Most days consisted of three three-hour sessions: 10-1, 2-5, 6-9, and 10-1, year-in and year-out. Eighty percent of the songs would be completely new and unknown. Players would listen to a demo as their only introduction

Nashville writer and Source Award Winner Ruth White, who booked thousands of sessions from 1947 until 1990, said in a 2012 interview: "All master session musicians are capable. They never ask questions. Spicher is one of the musicians you don't have to worry about. He knows instinctively what to do."

Spicher himself put it this way: "The thing that makes the whole thing work and tick is finding that hit song and that great singer who's gonna pull it off. That's what makes it tick … We do all the things to get set up and then if we're real lucky, and everybody's feelin' good, it just has a certain magical feel and then if nobody else has anything like it on another label… there's a lot of luck involved. And people who don't have that much feeling but can read like crazy think they can just go in there and create what we did, but it isn't that easy."

Spicher throughout this time toured the US, UK, France, and Japan with many stars including, Ray Price, Loretta Lynn, and Crystal Gayle. He was part of a Grand Ole Opry show, one with Area Code 615, one with Nashville Super Pickers, and one with Eddie Mitchell.

He formed a Western Swing band which played weekly for eight years at Wolfy's, one of the city's famous night spots. Sometimes friends such as Merle Haggard would come off the road and join the band for a tune or two.

Spicher was the fiddler, violinist, and cellist for Area Code 615, a Nashville country rock band active in the late 1960s and early 1970s. The band's "Trip in the Country" album was a top-five finalist for a Grammy award in 1970, in the Best Contemporary Instrumental Performance category.

The nominees were:

- Blood Sweat & Tears—Variations on a Theme By Erik Satie
- Area Code 615—Trip in the Country
- Boots Randolph—With Love
- Ferrante & Teicher—Midnight Cowboy
- Henry Mancini—A Time for Us (Love Theme from Romeo and Juliet)

In the 1980s Spicher was a part of a country/jazz band called The Superpickers. The lineup included steel guitarist Buddy Emmons, drummer Buddy Harmon, bassist Henry Strzelecki, pianist Willie Rainsford, and harmonica player Terry McMillan.

He joined producers Randall Franks and Alan Autry for the In the Heat of the Night cast CD “Christmas Time’s A Comin’” performing on the title track with the cast on the CD released on Sonlite and MGM/UA for one of the most popular Christmas releases of 1991 and 1992 with Southern retailers. He also shared his talents on the feature performance of “Bring a Torch, Jeanette Isabella” by late TV legend Carroll O'Connor.

== Awards ==
In 2008, he was named as one of the "Nashville Cats", a designation given by the Country Music Hall of Fame to musicians important in country music history. The Nashville Cats honor, held in the Country Music Hall of Fame's Ford Theater, involves a two-hour program highlighting Spicher's career accomplishments. He is one of sixteen Nashville Cats featured as part of a Johnny Cash and Bob Dylan exhibit at the Hall. As Stephen Betts writes in the October 14, 2014 issue of Rolling Stone magazine, the exhibit highlights the work of the Cats with famous artists in genres other than country.

He was inducted into the National Fiddler Hall of Fame in 2010. Its website states that Spicher has played on more recordings than any other fiddler.

== Current work ==
Spicher taught fiddlers Billy Contreras, Maggie Estes, Lisa Silver, Dennis Stroughmatt, and Wanda Vick among others; and is collaborating with Estes on a CD. He was an adjunct professor at Belmont University in Nashville until December 2016, and has been active in fiddle camps and seminars throughout the US for the past fifteen years. He organizes and hosts a monthly jam session at The Fiddle House in Nashville, often featuring one of his fellow session players. His career is the subject of a 2012 Master in Performing Arts thesis by a Belmont post-graduate student.

He co-wrote with Jimmy Martin "Goin' Up Dry Branch"; fiddler Michael Cleveland and Flamekeeper's version of the song won the International Bluegrass Music Association's Instrumental Recorded Performance prize in 2011.

He, Cleveland and banjoist Alison Brown collaborated with Grammy-nominated bluegrass band The Special Consensus on John Denver's "Thank God I'm a Country Boy". The version won Best Instrumental Recorded Performance prize from IBMA in 2014.
