= Kenny Baker (fiddler) =

American fiddle player (1926–2011)

- Baker in 2008

Background information
- Born: Kenneth Clayton Baker; June 26, 1926; Burdine, Kentucky, U.S.
- Origin: Jenkins, Kentucky, U.S.
- Died: July 8, 2011 (aged 85) Gallatin, Tennessee, U.S.
- Genres: Bluegrass
- Occupation: Musician
- Instruments: Fiddle, guitar
- Years active: 1953–2011

Kenneth Clayton Baker (June 26, 1926 – July 8, 2011) was an American fiddle player best known for his 25-year tenure with Bill Monroe and his group The Blue Grass Boys.

== Biography ==
Baker was born in Burdine, Kentucky and learned the fiddle by accompanying his father, also a fiddler. Early on, he was influenced by the swing fiddler Marion Sumner, as well as Django Reinhardt and Stéphane Grappelli. After working for Bethlehem Steel in the coal mines of Kentucky, he served in the United States Navy before pursuing a musical career full-time. He soon joined Don Gibson's band as a replacement for Marion Sumner. Baker, who played western swing, had little interest in bluegrass music until he heard "Wheel Hoss" and "Roanoke". During a package show with Don Gibson, Baker met Monroe and was offered a job. He cut his first recordings with Monroe's Blue Grass Boys on December 15, 1957.

Baker served more years in Monroe's band than any other musician and was selected by Monroe to record the fiddle tunes passed down from Uncle Pen Vandiver. After leaving the Blue Grass Boys in 1984, Baker played with a group of friends, Bob Black, Alan Murphy, and Aleta Murphy. Bob Black and Alan Murphy recorded an album with Baker in 1973, Dry & Dusty. After the one summer with Black and the Murphy's, Baker teamed with Josh Graves, who had played resonator guitar for Lester Flatt & Earl Scruggs as a Foggy Mountain Boy. Baker teamed with Graves until Graves' death in 2006.

Baker is considered to be one of the most influential fiddlers in bluegrass music. His "long-bow" style added a smoothness and clarity to the fiddle-based music of his boss, Grand Ole Opry member Bill Monroe. His long tenure with Bill Monroe included banjo player Bill Keith's development of the "melodic" method of banjo playing that included note for note representations of fiddle tunes on the banjo.

He recorded multiple albums for various record labels, including County Records, Jasmine, Rounder Records, Ridge Runner Records, and most recently OMS Records. His most recent recordings include Cotton Baggin' 2000 and Spider Bit the Baby on OMS Records. It was often mentioned that Baker's records were more popular at Bill Monroe concerts than the band's own releases. There were, and remain, hordes of Baker students of the bluegrass fiddle.

As well as a performer, Baker was also a composer of a number of popularly played bluegrass fiddle tunes.

Prior to his death, Baker lived in Gallatin, Tennessee.

Kenny Baker died July 8, 2011, at Sumner Regional Medical Center in Gallatin, Tennessee, due to complications from a stroke.

== Awards and honors ==
Baker was a recipient of a 1993 National Heritage Fellowship awarded by the National Endowment for the Arts, which is the highest honor in the folk and traditional arts in the United States. He was named to the International Bluegrass Music Hall of Honor in 1999.
