= Bessie Lee Mauldin =

- Born: December 28, 1920; Norwood, North Carolina
- Died: February 8, 1983 (aged 62) Albemarle, North Carolina
- Genres: Bluegrass
- Occupation(s): Bassist, Singer, Songwriter
- Instrument(s): Bass, Vocals
- Years active: 1953–1964

Bessie Lee Mauldin (December 28, 1920 – February 8, 1983) was an American bluegrass bassist, singer, songwriter, and a member of the bluegrass band “Bill Monroe and the Blue Grass Boys” from 1953–1964. Bessie Lee was nicknamed "The Carolina Songbird" by Bill Monroe.

== Pioneer and trailblazer ==
Bessie Lee was one of the first professional women bluegrass bass players, a trail blazer, and as such Bessie Lee paved the way for both men and women bluegrass bass players for generations that continues to this very day. As one of the first female bluegrass bass players she more than rose to the occasion as a foundational member in Monroe’s bluegrass band for over a decade. She was one of the Bluegrass Boys from 1953–1964. Bessie Lee Maudlin was a prolific contributor, as a member of Bill Monroe’s Blue Grass Boys. She played string bass on 35 of Monroe’s recording sessions, which amounted to 111 cuts, and no other musician or Blue Grass Boy contributed to more recordings, with the exception of Kenny Baker, his fiddler.

== Bandmate and bassist ==
There is plenty of evidence that Bessie Lee was a string bass player at least on par, if not exceeding, her professional contemporaries. Her length of time in the band, twelve years in the band, is one primary indication of her own long-lasting professionalism. Monroe, with his high degree of professionalism and virtuosity played with exceptionally talented musicians, of the time, and Bessie was no exception. He is known to have demanded the best and must have found her playing to be rhythmically and stylistically solid for his hard driving and up-tempo bluegrass music. Her playing was more than just the straight ahead root-five and her ability to add bass runs as was evident on her recordings. Bessie Lee recorded with Monroe both vocally and instrumentally, which began on September 16, 1955. The depth of her talents are demonstrated by her recordings in numerous keys, for example, “A, B-flat, B, C, possibly C-sharp, D, E, F, G, and possibility G-sharp”. She was a bandmate and bassist of professional levels that endured for over a decade, and in the face of much adversity.

== Early years and personal life ==
Unfortunate but understandable, little is known of Bessie Lee’s private life as she lived in the shadows as both a bass player, and Bill Monroe’s first “other women”. What is known of her private life mostly comes from Monroe’s biography, Can’t You Hear Me Callin’” by Richard D. Smith. Some fans and supporters of Monroe seem to indicate that too much may have been revealed by Smith’s writing. These writings exposed potentially intimate facts concerning the impropriety of Bessie Lee and Bill’s relationship. During the time of their alleged intimate relationship Monroe was married to Carolyn Brown.

Mauldin’s and Monroe’s partnered personal relationship seems to stand in contrast to their professional lives together and in contrasts to the deeply religious music they performed and created. Bessie Lee had a profound influence on Bill Monroe both on and off the stage. Their relationship of was an inspiration for Bill’s music and is evident by several of his songs. One of them being “How Do I Explain you?” as pointed out by Murphy Hicks Henry in her book “Pretty Good for a Girl”, and indeed, he never really did accurately explain their relationship.

Bill’s influence on Bessie Lee was both impactful and long lasting (also three decades). Bessie Lee would have apparently met Bill Monroe in early 1936 at the high school in Norwood, North Carolina (though it is not known for certain). Bessie Lee was a winner of a school contest for selling the most Monroe Brothers tickets for a show the Monroe’s were performing at the school. In early 1936 The Monroe Brothers performed on the radio in Charlotte, N.C. near her hometown of Norwood, N.C. Of the few songs that Monroe and Mauldin wrote together, one of the most popular ones was a gospel song, A Voice From On High, which was performed by various musical artist, including The Stanley Brothers Ricky Skaggs, and Bob Dylan who performed it as an opening number in August 2002.

== Death ==
Bessie Lee Maudlin moved back to her hometown of Norwood, North Carolina, and was cared for by family members. Bessie Lee Mauldin died on February 8, 1983, at Stanley Memorial Hospital in Albemarle near her hometown of Norwood, North Carolina from “acute myocardial infarction” exacerbated by diabetes.

== Discography ==
- Discography of American Historical Recordings, s.v. "Mauldin, Bessie Lee," accessed October 20, 2020, https://adp.library.ucsb.edu/names/330318
