= Natasha's Waltz =

Compilation album by Norman Blake
- Released: 1987
- Genre: Americana, bluegrass, folk
- Length: 65:26
- Label: Rounder
- Producer: Norman Blake, Nancy Blake

Norman Blake chronology
The Norman & Nancy Blake Compact Disc (1986)	Natasha's Waltz (1987)	Slow Train through Georgia (1987)

Professional ratings
Review scores
Source	Rating
Allmusic	4/5 stars

Natasha's Waltz is a compilation album of American guitarist Norman Blake, released in 1987. It contains all of the tracks from the vinyl release Original Underground Music from the Mysterious South, along with six tracks from Full Moon on the Farm and two tracks from Rising Fawn String Ensemble. The cover is the same as Original Underground Music from the Mysterious South.

== Track listing ==
1. "New Brick Road" – 3:33
2. "Dusty Rose" – 3:50
3. "Walnut River" – 2:22
4. "Pig on the Engine" – 2:50
5. "Third Street Gypsy Rag" – 3:03
6. "Georgia Home" – 2:59
7. "Peezlewhister" – 3:44
8. "Old Fiddler's Roll Call" – 2:10
9. "Pueblo" – 2:44
10. "The Toneality" – 3:33
11. "Natasha's Waltz" – 4:08
12. "Blake's March" – 2:28
13. "Texola Waltz" – 1:56
14. "Diamonds in the Rough" – 4:03
15. "Jeff Davis" – 2:42
16. "Nancy's Hornpipe" – 3:28
17. "Three Ravens" – 1:59
18. "Sleepy-Eyed Joe" – 3:01
19. "Cairo Waltz" – 2:00
20. "Davenport March" – 3:33
21. "Obc, No. 3 Blake" – 5:49

== Personnel ==
- Norman Blake – vocals, banjo, fiddle, guitar, mandolin, mandocello, tenor banjo
- Nancy Blake – fiddle, mandolin, accordion, cello, vocals
- James Bryan – fiddle
- Charlie Collins – fiddle, guitar
- Carl Jones – banjo, guitar, mandolin, mandola, tenor banjo
- Peter Ostroushko – fiddle, guitar, mandolin
