= Nobody's Business =

Nobody's Business may refer to:

== Books ==
- "Nobody's Business" (comic) 1987 Disney Donald Duck comic
- "Nobody's Business", prize-winning short story from collection Unaccustomed Earth by Jhumpa Lahiri
- Act 1 – Morning – "Nobody's business" from Sweet Lavender play in three acts by Arthur Wing Pinero, first performed in 1888.

== Film and TV ==
- Nobody's Business (film), a 1926 film by Norman Taurog with Lloyd Hamilton, Dick Sutherland, James T. Kelley
- Nobody's Business, film by Alan Berliner
- "Nobody's Business", Season 2 Episode 3 of The Manipulators (1971)

== Music ==
- Nobody's Business (album), Japan market only album by Bobby Harrison and friends 1977
- "Nobody's Business" (song), 2012 by Rihanna and Chris Brown
- "Nobody's Business", song by the Country Gentlemen from Bluegrass at Carnegie Hall 1962
- "Nobody's Business", song by John Fahey, from Your Past Comes Back To Haunt You: The Fonotone Years 1958–1965
- "Nobody's Business", song by Lou Reed from Coney Island Baby 1976
- "Nobody's Business", song by Peter Hammill from Nadir's Big Chance 1975
- "Nobody's Business", song by guitarist Norman Blake from Nashville Blues (album) 1984 and Slow Train Through Georgia
- "Nobody's Business", song by H_{2}O (Scottish band) featuring Billie from Shakedown (band) which entered the UK top 20 chart
- "Nobody's Business", song by Myra Flynn featuring Rayvon 2015
- Josh Logan & Nobody's Business, a band fronted by Josh Logan (rock singer)

== See also ==
- "Ain't Nobody's Business", classic blues song - signature tune of Jimmy Witherspoon
