= Herschel Sizemore =

American mandolinist (1935–2022)

- Birth name: Herschel Lee Sizemore
- Born: August 6, 1935; Sheffield, Alabama, U.S.
- Died: September 9, 2022 (aged 87); Roanoke, Virginia, U.S.
- Genres: Bluegrass music
- Occupation: Musician
- Instrument: Mandolin
- Years active: 1957–2022
- Labels: Hay Holler Records

Herschel Lee Sizemore (August 6, 1935 – September 9, 2022) was an American mandolinist in the bluegrass tradition.

== Biography ==
=== Early years ===
Sizemore was raised in Leighton, Alabama, near Muscle Shoals. When he was age eight, Sizemore's parents took him to see a performance by Bill Monroe at the Grand Ole Opry.

=== Music career ===
The first portion of Sizemore's career was spent playing in established bluegrass bands. From 1957 until 1965, Sizemore played with the Dixie Gentlemen with Jake Landers and Rual Yarbrough. In 1971, the Dixie Gentlemen reunited for a period of time.

Sizemore was a member of The Boys from Shiloh in 1966, along with Bobby Smith (lead vocal, guitar), Rual Yarbrough (baritone vocal, banjo), Charlie Nixon (resonator guitar), and Johnny Montgomery (bass). Sizemore then played with Jimmy Martin from 1967 until 1968.

From 1968 until 1974, Sizemore played with the Shenandoah Cut-Ups, trading solos with fiddler Tater Tate and flatpicker Wesley Golding.

Sizemore, Wesley Golding, and Tom McKinney left the Shenandoah Cut-Ups to form Country Grass, which lasted from 1974 until 1976. Other members included Tom Gray (bass, vocals), Ricky Skaggs (fiddle), and Ronnie Bucke (drums). Sizemore was also one of Del McCoury's Dixie Pals from 1978 until 1979. Other Pals included Jerry McCoury (upright bass), Dick Smith (banjo), and the late Sonny Miller (fiddle). The Dixie Pals (with Mike Hargrove) reunited at a 2012 benefit concert for Sizemore.

Sizemore was a member of the Bluegrass Cardinals from 1991 until 1995.

=== Solo recordings ===
In 1995, Sizemore formed the Herschel Sizemore Band. His first solo album Bounce Away was released in 1979, and in 2000, Sizemore released the album My Style on Hay Holler with Jim Haley (guitar), Terry Baucom (banjo), and Eddie Biggerstaff and Ron Stewart (fiddle).

In 2009, Sizemore released the album B-Natural with Terry Baucom (banjo), Jimmy Haley (guitar), Ron Stewart (fiddle), (Mike Bub) (bass), and Alan Bibey (guitar, mandolin).

=== Mandolin in B ===
Sizemore and his wife Joyce were both diagnosed with cancer on the same day in fall 2011. On February 19, 2012, a benefit concert for the Sizemores was staged in Roanoke, Virginia. The documentary film Mandolin in B focused on Sizemore's life and music. The film was directed by Rick Bowman and released by Backyard Green Films.

=== Songwriting ===
Sizemore's best-known composition is the mandolin instrumental "Rebecca," named after his mother. It has been covered by several other artists.

=== Personal life and death ===
Sizemore died on September 9, 2022, at the age of 87.

=== Awards ===
In 2011, Sizemore was inducted into the Alabama Bluegrass Hall of Fame.

== Discography ==
=== Solo albums ===
- 1979: Bounce Away (County) listed on the album as "Hershel Sizemore"
- 1993: Back in Business (Hay Holler)
- 2000: My Style (Hay Holler)
- 2009: B-natural (self-released)

=== Jake Landers and Herschel Sizemore ===
- 2013: For Old Times Sake (B Sharp)

=== The Blue Ridge Mountain Boys ===
- 1963: Blue Grass Back Home (Time)
- 1963: Hootenanny N' Blue Grass (Time)

=== Shenandoah Valley Quartet ===
- 1970: Shenandoah Valley Quartet with Jim Eanes (County)

=== The Shenandoah Cut-Ups ===
- 1971: Bluegrass Autumn (Revonah)
- 1971: Plant Grass (In Your Ear) (MRC)
- 1971: Curly Seckler Sings Again (County) recorded with the Shenandoah Cut-Ups
- 1973: The Shenandoah Cutups Sing Gospel (Revonah)
- 1973: Shenandoah Cut Ups (Rebel)
- 1974: Traditional Bluegrass (Revonah)
- 1980: Keep It Bluegrass (Grassound)

=== The Dixie Gentlemen ===
- 1963: The Country Style of the Dixie Gentlemen (United Artists)
- 1973: Together Once More (Old Homestead)
- 1973: Blues and Bluegrass (Old Homestead) with Tut Taylor and Vassar Clements

=== The Country Grass ===
- 1974: Livin' Free (Rebel)

=== Roby Huffman and the Bluegrass Cutups ===
- 1978: Colorado River (Grassound)

=== Del McCoury and the Dixie Pals ===
- 1981: Take Me To the Mountains (Leather)

=== Bluegrass Cardinals ===
- 1997: Mountain Girl (BGC)

=== As composer ===
- 1971: Jake Landers and Tom McKinney - Present Original Songs and New Banjo Sounds of the 70's (Tune) - track 11, "Bluegrass Minor"
- 1976: Bottle Hill - Light Our Way Along the Highway (Biograph) - track 12, "Bluegrass Autumn"
- 1976: The Conner Brothers - The Conner Brothers (County) - track 10, "Bluegrass Minor"
- 1981: The Landers Family - Old Folks Don't Live Here (Old Homestead) - track 4, " I Thank God For America Today" (co-written with Jake Landers)
- 1981: Al Wood and the Smokey Ridge Boys - Kentucky Country Home (Rich-R-Tone) - track 1, "Kentucky Country Home"
- 1998: Jim Mills - Bound to Ride (Sugar Hill) - track 6, "Rebecca"

=== Also appears on ===
- 1968: Rual Yarbrough - 5 String Banjo By Rual Yarbrough (Tune)
- 1969: Jim Eanes - Rural Rhythm Presents Jim Eanes (Rural Rhythm)
- 1969: Clarence "Tater" Tate - Rural Rhythm Presents Fiddling Clarence "Tater" Tate: More Favorite Waltzes (Rural Rhythm)
- 1986: Tim Smith - Favorite Pastimes (Heritage)
- 1994: David Parmley - Southern Heritage (Rebel)
- 1998: Bill Harrell - The Cat Came Back (Rebel)
- 2004: John Lawless - Five & Dime (Copper Creek)
- 2005: Curly Seckler - Down in Caroline (Copper Creek)
- 2005: Curly Seckler - That Old Book of Mine (County)
- 2007: Curly Seckler - Bluegrass, Don't You Know (Copper Creek)
- 2008: Lynwood Lunsford - Pick Along (Hay Holler)

=== Music instruction ===
- 2001: Acutab Transcriptions Vol. 1 (Mel Bay) ISBN 978-0786660797
- 2010: Herschel Sizemore: In His Own Style DVD (Mel Bay)
