= Hand Me Down My Walking Cane =

1880 song by James A. Bland

"Hand Me Down My Walking Cane" is a song written by African-American musician James A. Bland in 1880. It has acquired the status of a folk song, and is cataloged as Roud Folk Song Index No. 11,733.

== Origins ==
Though often (since the 1990s) credited to James A. Bland, the song may actually be of folk origin, or at least put together by Bland based on the singing of laborers on the campus of Howard University. There is a known plantation spiritual, "Hand me down my silver trumpet, Gabriel, all my sins been washed away," which itself may have derived from another spiritual, "All my sins done taken away." Also, the sea shanty "The Hog Eye Man," 1849–1850, (shanties were often adaptations of plantation songs) contains the words, "Go fetch me down my riding cane." It is often impossible to determine what melodies were in use for known 19th century lyrics, and there is no indication that these fairly similar lyrics had melodies at all related to "Hand Me Down My Walking Cane".

== Recordings ==
The song has been recorded many times, in a variety of styles including country, Cajun, jazz, mountain, bluegrass, rock and roll, and acoustic and electric blues. Notable recordings include:

- Gid Tanner and His Skillet Lickers with Riley Puckett (1926)
- Kelly Harrell (1926), Victor 20103
- Earl Johnson (1927) (unreleased)
- Ernest V. Stoneman (1927) Edison Record 11481
- Sid Harkreader and Grady Moore (1927) Paramount Records 3022
- Karl Radlach and His Orchestra (directed by Bernie Cummins) (1930)
- Cléoma Breaux (1937), Decca 17059
- Carson Robison and Frank Luther (1945)
- Jerry Lee Lewis (1956), Sun Records
- Bing Crosby included the song in a medley on his album 101 Gang Songs (1961)
- Vern Williams and Ray Parks (1966), The Cabale, Berkeley, CA
- Norman Blake, Whiskey Before Breakfast (1976)
- The Knitters, Poor Little Critter on the Road (1985)
- On The Skillet Lickers Vol. 1 (1926–27), Document Records
- Robert Earl Keen, Gravitational Forces (2001), Lost Highway Records
- Michael Knott (2003), Spring 2003 Tour CD #2, independent
- Junior Wells and Pistol Pete, Chicago Blues Jam Vol. 5 (DVD) (2005)
- Charlie Byrd and the Charlie Byrd Ensemble (2008), Great Chefs. Great Music
- Jack Rose and the Black Twig Pickers (2009), Jack Rose and the Black Twig Pickers, Klang Industries
- Tex Morton

== References in other songs ==
- The 1945 song "Look on Yonder Wall" includes the line "Look on yonder wall, hand me down my walkin' cane".
- "Please Don't Bury Me", on John Prine's 1973 album Sweet Revenge, has the line "Hand me down my walking cane / It's a sin to tell a lie", which also references the 1936 song "It's a Sin to Tell a Lie"
- The opening line of the 1976 song "The Rubberband Man" from the album Happiness Is Being with the Spinners is "Hand me down my walking cane / Hand me down my hat" (lyrics Linda Creed, music Thom Bell).
- The 1985 Dire Straits song "Walk of Life" includes the lyric "Here comes Johnny, gonna tell you the story / Hand me down my walkin' shoes".
- The 2002 Guy Clark song "Soldier’s Joy, 1864" includes the lyric "Hand me down my walking cane / I ain’t cut out for war".
- Bob Dylan sings the line "Hand Me Down My Walking Cane" in his song "Ain't Talkin'" on his 2006 album Modern Times.
