= The Norman & Nancy Blake Compact Disc =

Compilation album by Norman Blake, Nancy Blake
- Released: 1986
- Genre: Americana, bluegrass, folk
- Length: 64:12
- Label: Rounder
- Producer: Norman Blake

Norman Blake chronology
| Lighthouse on the Shore (1985) | The Norman & Nancy Blake Compact Disc (1986) | Natasha's Waltz (1987) |

Professional ratings
Review scores
| Source | Rating |
|---|---|
| Allmusic | 4/5 stars |

The Norman & Nancy Blake Compact Disc is a compilation album of tracks by the American musicians Norman Blake and Nancy Blake, released in 1986. It contains all of the tracks from the vinyl release "Lighthouse on the Shore" and six tracks from Nancy Blake's solo release "Grand Junction".

== Track listing ==
1. "Hello Stranger" (Carter Family) – 3:07
2. "New Bicycle Hornpipe" (Norman Blake) – 2:32
3. "Marquis of Huntley" (William Marshall, Traditional) – 2:30
4. "Florida Rag" (John Hartford) – 3:08
5. "Jordan Am a Hard Road to Travel" (Uncle Dave Macon) – 3:59
6. "Belize" (Blake) – 3:40
7. "Elzic's Farewell" (Traditional) – 4:23
8. "Lighthouse on the Shore" (Blake) – 5:08
9. "Grand Junction" (Blake) – 3:05
10. "Butterfly Weed" (Blake) – 2:54
11. "President Garfield's Hornpipe" (Traditional) – 2:23
12. "In Russia (We Have Parking Lots, Too)" (Blake) – 2:42
13. "Wroxall" (Blake) – 2:14
14. "If I Lose, I Don't Care" (Traditional) – 3:01
15. "The Chrysanthemum" (Scott Joplin) – 3:47
16. "Lima Road Jig" (Blake) – 1:40
17. "Boston Boy/Last Night's Joy" (Traditional) – 2:21
18. "My Love Is Like a Red, Red Rose" (Robert Burns) – 3:49
19. "Peacock's Feather" (Traditional) – 1:42
20. "Wildwood Flower" (Carter Family) – 3:17
21. "Tennessee Mountain Fox Chase" (Traditional) – 2:50

== Personnel ==
- Norman Blake – vocals, banjo, fiddle, guitar, mandolin, mandola
- Nancy Blake – fiddle, mandolin, accordion, cello, bass guitar, guitar, vocals
- James Bryan – fiddle, viola
- Tom Jackson – banjo
