= Back Home in Sulphur Springs (Norman and Nancy Blake album) =

Studio album by Norman Blake and Nancy Blake
- Released: January 31, 2006
- Recorded: July 28 – 30, 2004
- Genre: Americana, folk
- Label: Western Jubilee

Norman Blake chronology
The Morning Glory Ramblers (2004)	Back Home in Sulphur Springs (2006)	Shacktown Road (2007)

Professional ratings
Review scores
Source	Rating
Allmusic	3.5/5 stars

Back Home in Sulphur Springs is an album by Americana and folk musicians Norman Blake and Nancy Blake, released in 2006. It is not the same title as Norman Blake's 1972 debut album. Rounder Records incorrectly titled the reissue of Home in Sulphur Springs the same as this release. The album was reissued again by Plectrafone Records.

== Track listing ==
All songs Traditional unless otherwise noted.

1. "More Good Women Gone Wrong" – 3:15
2. "Columbus Stockade Blues" – 3:24
3. "He's Coming to Us Dead" – 3:02
4. "The Girl I Left in Sunny Tennessee" – 3:35
5. "We Parted by the Riverside" – 3:56
6. "Ella Ree" – 3:37
7. "Happy Little Home in Arkansas" – 3:10
8. "Back Home in Sulphur Springs" (Norman Blake) – 3:24
9. "The Mermaid" – 5:25
10. "Take Me Home Poor Julia" – 4:36
11. "Seaboard Airline Rag" (Blake) – 2:51
12. "The Star-Spangled Banner" – 1:58
13. "The Empress of Ireland" (James Bryan) – 3:38
14. "Katy Cline" – 3:23
15. "Don't Be Afraid of the NeoCons" (Norman Blake) Hidden Track - 4:23

== Personnel ==
- Norman Blake – guitar, fiddle, mandolin, vocals, dobro
- Nancy Blake – guitar, mandolin, cello, vocals

== Production notes ==
- Butch Hause – engineer, mixing
- David Glasser – mastering
