= The Fields of November =

Studio album by Norman Blake
- Released: 1974
- Genre: Americana, folk
- Label: Flying Fish

Norman Blake chronology
Home in Sulphur Springs (1972)	The Fields of November (1974)	Old and New (1975)

Alternative Cover
- Cover of the reissue with Old and New

The Fields of November is an album of American guitarist Norman Blake, released in 1974. It was reissued in 1992 by Flying Fish along with Old and New as a double CD.

Blake later married Nancy Short, who plays cello on this release. They would release a number of duet albums throughout the years.

== Reception ==
Professional ratings
Review scores
Source	Rating
Allmusic	4.5/5 stars

In his Allmusic review, critic Jim Smith called the album " a thoroughly relaxed affair that did much to establish the sound he would follow throughout the rest of his career, mixing wistful ballads with controlled instrumental material. He demonstrates his musical prowess by playing fiddle, mandolin, and dobro, as well as composing all of the album's songs."

== Track listing ==
All songs by Norman Blake.

=== Side one ===
1. "Green Leaf Fancy"
2. "Last Train from Poor Valley"
3. "White Oak Swamp"
4. "Ruins of Richmond"
5. "Graycoat Soldiers"
6. "Caperton Ferry"
7. "Southern Railroad Blues"

=== Side two ===
1. "Lord Won't You Help Me"
2. "Krazy Kurtis"
3. "Coming Down from Rising Fawn"
4. "Uncle"
5. "The Old Brown Case"
6. "The Fields of November"

== Personnel ==
- Norman Blake – guitar, fiddle, dobro, mandolin, vocals
- Charlie Collins – guitar, fiddle
- Robert Arthur "Tut" Taylor – dobro
- Nancy Short – cello
