= Lighthouse on the Shore =

Studio album by Norman Blake
- Released: 1985
- Recorded: October 1984 in Rising Fawn, Georgia
- Genre: Americana, bluegrass, folk
- Label: Rounder
- Producer: Norman Blake

Norman Blake chronology
Nashville Blues (1984)	Lighthouse on the Shore (1985)	The Norman & Nancy Blake Compact Disc (1986)

Professional ratings
Review scores
Source	Rating
AllMusic	link

Lighthouse on the Shore is an album by American guitarist Norman Blake, released in 1985.

== Track listing ==
=== Side one ===
1. "Hello Stranger" (Carter Family) – 3:07
2. "New Bicycle Hornpipe" (Nancy Blake) – 2:32
3. "Marquis of Huntley" (William Marshall, Traditional) – 2:30
4. "Belize" (Blake) – 3:40
5. "Elzic's Farewell" (Traditional) – 4:23
6. "Lighthouse on the Shore" (Blake) – 5:08

=== Side two ===
1. "President Garfield's Hornpipe" (Traditional) – 2:23
2. "If I Lose, I Don't Care" (Traditional) – 3:01
3. "Butterfly Weed" (Blake) – 2:54
4. "Boston Boy/Last Night's Joy" (Traditional) – 2:21
5. "Jordan Am a Hard Road to Travel" (Uncle Dave Macon) – 3:59
6. "Peacock's Feather" (Traditional) – 1:42
7. "Wildwood Flower" (Carter Family) – 3:17
8. "Tennessee Mountain Fox Chase" (Traditional) – 2:50

== Personnel ==
- Norman Blake – guitar, vocals, mandola, mandolin, fiddle
- Nancy Blake – fiddle, vocals, cello, mandolin
- James Bryan – fiddle, viola
- Tom Jackson – banjo
