= Old Ties =

Compilation album by Norman Blake
- Released: 2002
- Genre: Americana, bluegrass, folk
- Label: Rounder

Norman Blake chronology
Flower From the Fields of Alabama (2001)	Old Ties (2002)	Meeting on Southern Soil (2002)

Professional ratings
Review scores
Source	Rating
AllMusic	5/5 stars

Old Ties is an album by American musician Norman Blake, released in 2002.

== Track listing ==
1. "Spanish Fandango" (Traditional) – 3:49
2. "Church St. Blues" (Norman Blake) – 2:54
3. "Sleepy Eyed Joe/Indian Creek" (Traditional) – 3:38
4. "O'Malley's Tune" (Traditional) – 2:30
5. "Fifty Miles of Elbow Room" (A. P. Carter) – 3:49
6. "Down Home Summertime Blues" (Blake) – 3:42
7. "Blind Dog" (Blake) – 2:55
8. "Fiddler's Dram/Whiskey Before Breakfast" (Traditional) – 3:35
9. "Old Ties" (Uncle Dave Macon) – 4:26
10. "Lost Indian" (Traditional) – 3:08
11. "Ginseng Sullivan" (Traditional) – 3:31
12. "Obc, No. 3" (Blake) – 5:48
13. "Prettiest Little Girl in the Country" (Traditional) – 2:17
14. "Uncle" (Blake) – 4:34
15. "Bristol in the Bottle" (Blake) – 2:05
16. "Billy Gray" (Blake) – 4:07
17. "The Fields of November" (Blake) – 4:06
18. "Gonna Lay Down My Old Guitar" (Alton Delmore, Rabon Delmore) – 3:34
19. "Randall Collins/Done Gone" (Blake) – 6:06

== Personnel ==
- Norman Blake – guitar, fiddle, vocals
- Nancy Blake – guitar, cello
- Tony Rice – guitar, vocals
- Doc Watson – guitar
- James Bryan – fiddle
- Charlie Collins – fiddle, guitar
- Ben Pedigoe – banjo
