= Home in Sulphur Springs =

Studio album by Norman Blake
- Released: 1972
- Recorded: Dec 30, 1971
- Genre: Americana, folk
- Length: 38:52
- Label: Rounder
- Producer: Tut Taylor, Norman Blake

Norman Blake chronology
Home in Sulphur Springs (1972)	The Fields of November (1974)

Home in Sulphur Springs is the debut album of American guitarist Norman Blake, released in 1972. The album was reissued by Rounder Records with the title incorrectly printed as Back Home in Sulphur Springs.

== Reception ==
Professional ratings
Review scores
Source	Rating
Allmusic	4.5/5 stars

In his Allmusic review, critic Jim Smith wrote "this record is among Blake's best, demonstrating his nearly incomparable virtuosity, easygoing style, and broad repertoire..."

== Track listing ==
1. "Little Joe" (Traditional) – 2:49
2. "Richland Avenue Rag" (Norman Blake) – 1:57
3. "When the Fields Are White With Daisies" (Blake) – 2:48
4. "Cattle in the Cane" (Traditional) – 2:12
5. "Crossing No. 9" (Blake) – 2:47
6. "Weave and Way" (Blake, Tut Taylor, Traditional) – 2:24
7. "Ginseng Sullivan" (Blake) – 3:31
8. "Bringing in the Georgia Mail" (Traditional) – 2:30
9. "Bully of the Town" (Traditional) – 2:03
10. "Randall Collins" (Blake) – 1:55
11. "Done Gone" (Traditional) – 1:39
12. "Down Home Summertime Blues" (Blake) – 3:42
13. "Warp Factor No. 9" (Blake) – 3:38
14. "Orphan Annie" (Blake) – 2:56
15. "Spanish Fandango" (Traditional) – 3:48

== Personnel ==
- Norman Blake – guitar, mandolin, vocals
- Tut Taylor – dobro

Production notes

- Produced by Norman Blake and Tut Taylor
- Claude J. Hill – mixing
- Slick Lawson – photography
- Michael Melford – liner notes, executive producer
