= Early Recordings (Uncle Dave Macon album) =

Early Recordings 1924–1925

Studio album by Uncle Dave Macon
- Released: 2001
- Recorded: 1924–1925
- Genre: Country
- Label: Old Homestead Records

Early Recordings are the early recordings of Uncle Dave Macon, released in 2001 and recorded between 1924-1925.

== Reception ==
Professional ratings
Review scores
| Source | Rating |
|---|---|
| AllMusic | 4.5/5 stars |

Eugene Chadbourne of Allmusic called it a "the real deal, a dozen monumental tracks lifted off the original 78 slabs that comprised the early-recording career of this eccentric and almost endlessly amusing old-time country star. Practically every track is some kind of classic."

== Track listing ==
1. "Old Man's Last Hope" – 2:29
2. "Keep My Skillet Good and Greasy" – 2:28
3. "Hill-Billie Blues" – 2:51
4. "All I've Got's Gone" – 2:36
5. "The Fox Chase" – 2:42
6. "Papa's Billie Goat" – 2:44
7. "The Old Log Cabin In The Lane" – 2:46
8. "She Was Always Chewing Gum" – 2:51
9. "I'm Going To Leave You Love" – 2:53
10. "Jonah And The Whale" – 3:05
11. "Love Somebody (instrumental)" – 2:57
12. "Soldier's Joy (instrumental)" – 2:51
13. "Bile Them Cabbage Down" – 2:59
14. "Down By The River" – 3:03
15. "Run, Nigger, Run" – 2:52
16. "Old Dan Tucker" – 3:02
17. "Station Will Be Changed After A While" – 3:17
18. "Rooster Crow Medley" – 3:00
19. "Just From Tennessee" – 3:00
20. "Watermelon Smilin' On A Vine" – 2:59
21. "All Go Hungry Hash House" – 3:22
22. "Oh, Where Is My Boy Tonight" – 2:44
23. "From Jerusalem To Jericho" – 3:06
24. "I Tickled Nancy" – 2:33
