= Friar Tut =

Studio album by Tut Taylor
- Released: 1972
- Recorded: December 29, 1971
- Studio: Glaser Sound (Nashville, Tennessee)
- Genre: Americana, folk, Bluegrass
- Length: 40:50
- Label: Rounder
- Producer: Tut Taylor

Friar Tut is an album by Americana and Bluegrass dobro player Tut Taylor, released in 1972. Taylor is joined by Norman Blake, Sam Bush and David Taylor. Taylor's son David was 16 years old at the time of this recording.

Friar Tut was reissued on CD in 1998.

== Reception ==
Professional ratings
Review scores
Source	Rating
Allmusic	4.5/5 stars

In his Allmusic review, music critic Tim Sheridan wrote the album "The steel strings sing on this disc of original songs from the dobro guitar master."

== Track listing ==
All songs by Tut Taylor unless otherwise noted.

1. "Sweet Picking Time in Toomsboro, Ga" – 1:53
2. "Ghost Picker" – 2:27
3. "Acoustic Toothpick" – 2:01
4. "Linda" – 2:42
5. "Midnight at Beanblossom" – 3:21
6. "Daisy Dean" (Traditional) – 2:50
7. "Sugar in the Gourd" – 1:25
8. "F-5 Waltz" – 2:16
9. "Arlo Buck" – 2:16
10. "Stevens Steel" – 3:17
11. "Picking on Josh" – 1:16
12. "Oasis" – 3:43
13. "This Ain't Grass" – 1:36
14. "The Old Shoemaker" (Norman Blake) – 2:26
15. "Me and My Dobro" – 2:44
16. "Southern Filibuster" – 2:37
17. "Friar Tut" – 2:00

== Personnel ==
- Tut Taylor – dobro, guitar
- Norman Blake – guitar, mandolin, vocals on "Daisy Dean"
- Sam Bush – mandolin
- David Taylor – guitar on "Me and My Dobro" and "Southern Filibuster"

Production notes

- Tut Taylor – producer
- Michael Melford – executive producer
- Claude J. Hill – engineer
- Dr. Toby Mountain – mastering
- Slick Lawson – photography
- Bobby Wolfe – liner notes
