= Old and New (album) =

Studio album by Norman Blake
- Released: 1975
- Genre: Americana, folk
- Label: Flying Fish
- Producer: Bruce Kaplan

Norman Blake chronology
The Fields of November (1974)	Old and New (1975)	Norman Blake/Tut Taylor/Sam Bush/Butch Robins/Vassar Clements/David Holland/Jethro Burns (1975)

Old and New is an album of American guitarist Norman Blake, released in 1975. It was reissued in 1992 by Flying Fish along with The Fields of November as a double CD.

== Reception ==
Professional ratings
Review scores
Source	Rating
Allmusic	4.5/5 stars

In his Allmusic review, critic Jim Smith wrote "All of the musicians from Fields of November are present, but overall the energy is higher, especially on the instrumentals "Miller's Reel" and "Aljimina.""

== Track listing ==
All songs by Norman Blake unless otherwise noted.

=== Side one ===
1. "Widow's Creek"
2. "Bristol in the Bottle"
3. "Billy Gray"
4. "Forked Deer" (Traditional)
5. "Rubagfre"
6. "Cuckoo's Nest" (Traditional)
7. "Witch of the Wake" (Traditional)
8. "My Old Home in the Green Mountain Side"

=== Side two ===
1. "Miller's Reel" (Traditional)
2. "Dry Grass in the High Fields"
3. "Harvey's Reel"
4. "The Railroad Days"
5. "Valley Head"
6. "Sweet Heaven" (Traditional)
7. "Sally in the Garden" (Traditional)
8. "Aljamina"
9. "Flat Rock"

== Personnel ==
- Norman Blake – guitar, fiddle, dobro, mandolin, vocals
- Charlie Collins – guitar, fiddle
- Nancy Short – cello, bass, viola
- Tut Taylor – dobro
- Ben Pedigo – banjo
