= Together Again (Bill Monroe and James Monroe album) =

Studio album by Bill and James Monroe
- Released: June 15, 1978
- Recorded: January 24–February 8, 1978
- Studio: Bradley's Barn (Mount Juliet, Tennessee)
- Genre: Bluegrass
- Label: MCA
- Producer: Walter Haynes

Bill Monroe chronology
Bluegrass Memories (1977)	Together Again (1978)	The Original Bluegrass Band (1978)

James Monroe chronology
Midnight Blues (1976)	Together Again (1978)	Satisfied Mind (1984)

Together Again is the second collaboration album by American bluegrass musician Bill Monroe and his son James. Released by MCA Records on June 15, 1978, it features ten songs recorded over three sessions between January 24 and February 8, 1978, with producer Walter Haynes.

== Background ==
James Monroe was a member of his father's band, the Blue Grass Boys, between 1964 and 1971. The following year, the father and son duo (backed by the rest of the Blue Grass Boys lineup) recorded their first official collaboration album Father & Son, which was released in March 1973. Although no longer an official member of his band, James continued to perform guitar at Bill's recording sessions between 1975 and 1978, contributing to The Weary Traveler, Bill Monroe Sings Bluegrass, Body and Soul and Bluegrass Memories during this period. The Blue Grass Boys would also continue to tour alongside James' group, the Midnight Ramblers.

== Recording ==
Bill and James Monroe recorded their second collaboration album over three sessions starting on January 24, 1978. According to future Blue Grass Boys member Tom Ewing in his book Bill Monroe: The Life and Music of the Blue Grass Man, the album would differ from Father & Son in two key ways: first, it would feature a mixture of new and older material, whereas the former contained "mainly older redos"; and second, it would feature a "somewhat bigger sound" than its predecessor, with Bill's Blue Grass Boys joined by second banjo player Alan O'Bryant and second fiddler James Bryan, both drafted in from James' Midnight Ramblers.

At the first session, the expanded group started by recording "Hard Times Have Been Here", a new song written by Damon Black, who had earlier written "I Haven't Seen Mary in Years" for Father & Son. This was followed by "Six Feet Under the Ground", a Bill Monroe original he had started writing over 15 years earlier, and a new version of the Monroe Brothers track "Little Red Shoes", retitled "Who's Gonna Shoe Your Pretty Little Feet". The second session took place on January 30, 1978, and saw the band recording a second Damon Black title, "The Jake Satterfield", and covers of The Seldom Scene's "Muddy Waters" and Bo Carter's "Corinna, Corinna".

The third and final session for Together Again took place just over a week later, on February 8, 1978. Recording started with another new version of a Monroe Brothers track, "Have a Feast Here Tonight", which was followed by a cover of Stuart Hamblen's "Golden River", a re-recording of Monroe's "I'm Going Back to Old Kentucky" (originally released as a single in 1949, and first re-recorded in 1961 for Bluegrass Ramble), and finally a song written by Midnight Ramblers banjo player Alan O'Bryant, "Those Memories of You". This session marked Monroe's last at Bradley's Barn, which was destroyed in a fire in 1980, as well as the last time James recorded with his father for one of their own releases.

== Release ==
Together Again was released by MCA Records on June 15, 1978. No songs from the album were issued as singles.

== Track listing ==
Together Again track listing
No.	Title	Writer(s)	Length
1.	"Six Feet Under the Ground" (recorded January 24, 1978)	Bill Monroe	2:04
2.	"Hard Times Have Been There" (recorded January 24, 1978)	Damon Black	3:04
3.	"Corinna, Corinna" (recorded January 30, 1978)	Bo Carter; Mitchell Parish; J. Mayo Williams	1:47
4.	"Muddy Waters" (recorded January 30, 1978)	Phil Rosenthal	2:05
5.	"Those Memories of You" (recorded February 8, 1978)	Alan O'Bryant	3:14
6.	"I'm Going Back to Old Kentucky" (recorded February 8, 1978)	Monroe	2:16
7.	"The Jake Satterfield" (recorded January 30, 1978)	Black	2:44
8.	"Have a Feast Here Tonight" (recorded February 8, 1978)	Traditional	1:53
9.	"Who's Gonna Shoe Your Pretty Little Feet" (recorded January 24, 1978)	Traditional	2:30
10.	"Golden River" (recorded February 8, 1978)	Stuart Hamblen	2:59
Total length:			24:36

== Personnel ==
- Bill Monroe — mandolin, vocals (tenor on all; lead on tracks 1 and 6)
- James Monroe — guitar, lead vocals
- Wayne Lewis — guitar
- Joseph "Butch" Robins — banjo
- Alan O'Bryant — banjo
- Kenny Baker — fiddle
- James Bryan — fiddle
- Randy Davis — string bass

== Bibliography ==
- Ewing, Tom (September 7, 2018), Bill Monroe: The Life and Music of the Blue Grass Man (Music in American Life), Champaign, Illinois: University of Illinois Press, ISBN 978-0252041891
