= Just Gimme Somethin' I'm Used To =

Studio album by Norman Blake, Nancy Blake
- Released: 1992
- Genre: Americana, bluegrass, folk
- Length: 62:36
- Label: Shanachie
- Producer: Norman Blake, Nancy Blake

Norman Blake chronology
Norman Blake and Tony Rice 2 (1990)	Just Gimme Somethin' I'm Used To (1992)	While Passing Along This Way (1994)

Professional ratings
Review scores
Source	Rating
Allmusic	3/5 stars

Just Gimme Somethin' I'm Used To is an album of American musicians Norman Blake and Nancy Blake, released in 1992. It was nominated for a Grammy Award for Best Traditional Folk Album.

== Track listing ==
1. "Waiting for the Boatman" – 4:16
2. "Georgia Railroad" – 3:26
3. "Silence or Tears" – 3:20
4. "The Poor Little Sailor Boy" – 6:17
5. "Medley: Green Leaf Fancy/The Fields of November/Gonna Go Huntin' " – 7:24
6. "When the Work's All Done This Fall" (Traditional) – 4:01
7. "Brickyard Joe" – 3:20
8. "Mr. Garfield" (Ramblin' Jack Elliott) – 7:22
9. "Old Grimes" – 2:27
10. "Wabash Cannonball" (A. P. Carter) – 5:02
11. "I'd Rather Be an Old Time Christian" – 3:20
12. "Little Matty Groves" – 7:03
13. "Walking Tune" – 5:15

== Personnel ==
- Norman Blake – guitar, fiddle, vocals
- Nancy Blake – guitar, cello, vocals
