= When the Fields Are White With Daisies =

Single by Sean Dunphy and the Hoedowners
- B-side: "What Am I Doing Hangin' 'Round?"
- Released: 1969
- Recorded: 1969
- Genre: showband, sentimental ballad
- Length: 3:11
- Label: Dolphin
- Songwriters: C. M. Denison, William A. Pratt, Hickman, Smith
- Producer: Noel Kelehan

Sean Dunphy and the Hoedowners singles chronology
"Lonely Woods of Upton" (1969)	"When the Fields Are White With Daisies" (1969)	"The Old Fenian Gun" (1969)

"When the Fields Are White With Daisies" is a First World War-era sentimental ballad.

== Lyrics ==
The song is written from the point of the view of a soldier of the First World War, who promises to return to his lover when daisies and roses are blooming again.

== Song history ==
"When the Fields Are White With Daisies" was published in 1909 by C. M. Denison, with music by William A. Pratt. Other accounts credit the song to a Mrs. S. J. Kildare, with music by Leo Friedman. It is alluded to in P. G. Wodehouse's 1910 novel Psmith in the City. It was popular with soldiers in the First World War.

"When the Fields Are White With Daisies" was released by Sean Dunphy in 1969, and was number one on the Irish Singles Chart for a week in August 1969.

The song has also been recorded by Florrie Forde and Norman Blake.
