= Flower from the Fields of Alabama =

Flower From the Fields of Alabama

Studio album by Norman Blake
- Released: 2001
- Genre: Americana, bluegrass, folk
- Label: Shanachie
- Producer: Norman Blake

Norman Blake chronology
Far Away, Down on a Georgia Farm (1999)	Flower From the Fields of Alabama (2001)	Old Ties (2002)

Professional ratings
Review scores
Source	Rating
Allmusic	[Flower from the Fields of Alabama at AllMusic link]

Flower From the Fields of Alabama is an album by the American musician Norman Blake, released in 2001.

== Track listing ==
All songs traditional unless otherwise noted.

1. "Salty Dog" – 4:21
2. "Bonaparte's Grand March" – 5:20
3. "The Slopes of Beech Mountain" (Blake) – 3:10
4. "Sitting on Top of the World"" (Lonnie Chatmon, Walter Vinson) – 6:22
5. "Radio Joe" (Blake) – 3:57
6. "Chasin' Rainbows" – 3:33
7. "Flower from the Fields of Alabama" – 4:07
8. "Texas Gales" – 4:01
9. "All Go Hungry Hash House" – 3:48
10. "So Tired" – 5:11
11. "The Gambler's Dying Words" – 2:50
12. "Little Bunch of Roses" – 3:16
13. "Eastbound Freight Train" (Grandpa Jones) – 3:33
14. "The Burial of Wild Bill" – 3:23
15. "T.A.G. Railroad Rag" (Blake) – 6:10
16. "If We Never Meet Again" (Albert E. Brumley) – 5:19

== Personnel ==
- Norman Blake - guitar, mandolin, vocals, fiddle, slide guitar
- Bob Chuckrow - guitar, harmony vocal, mandola
