= Earl Johnson (fiddler) =

American fiddler (1886–1965)

Background information
- Born: Robert Earl Johnson; August 24, 1886; Gwinnett County, Georgia, U.S.
- Died: May 31, 1965 (aged 78)
- Genres: old time
- Occupation: Musician
- Instruments: Fiddle, Banjo
- Label: Okeh Records
- Formerly of: Earl Johnson and His Dixie Entertainers; Earl Johnson and His Clodhoppers

Robert Earl Johnson (August 24, 1886 in Gwinnett County, Georgia – May 31, 1965) was an old time fiddler who was influenced by the music of Gid Tanner and his Skillet Lickers.

== Biography ==
Johnson learned to play the fiddle at an early age with some assistance from his father. When he was young, he used to practice with his two brothers, Albert on banjo and Ester on guitar. Between 1920 and 1934, he was a regular participant at the Atlanta Fiddlers' Convention. In 1923, Albert and Ester were victims of an epidemic.

The same year, Johnson joined Fiddlin' John Carson's Virginia Reelers and within two years made his first recordings on Paramount Records. Initially, he recorded with the Dixie String Band and Arthur Tanner. He became the Georgia state fiddle champion of 1926 in Atlanta.

Johnson formed the Dixie Entertainers with guitarist Byrd Moore and banjoist Emmett Bankston and they made their first recordings for Okeh Records on Feb. 21, 1927. When Byrd Moore left, Johnson added guitarist Lee "Red" Henderson and formed The Clodhoppers. The new band became successful, recording for Okeh Records in October 1927.

Although he made his last recordings in 1931, Johnson continued to perform on radio and at fiddlers' conventions for the remainder of his life. His last performance was on May 24, 1965, at the Stone Mountain Fiddlers' Convention in Georgia. He died of a heart attack a week later.

== Original discography ==
Earl Johnson's Dixie Entertainers

| Matrix | Title | Record # | Recording date |
|---|---|---|---|
| 80460 | "Hand Me Down My Walking Cane" | Unissued | February 21, 1927 |
| 80461 | "Ain't Nobody's Business" | Okeh 45092 | February 21, 1927 |
| 80462 | "Dixie" | Okeh 45129 | February 21, 1927 |
| 80463 | "Hen Cackle" | Okeh 45123 | February 21, 1927 |
| 80464 | "Bully of the Town" | Unissued | February 21, 1927 |
| 80465 | "I'm Satisfied" | Okeh 45129 | February 21, 1927 |
| 80466 | "Three Night's Experience" | Okeh 45092 | February 21, 1927 |
| 80467 | "Johnson's Old Grey Mule" | Okeh 45123 | February 21, 1927 |
| 80625 | "Boil Dem Cabbage Down" | Okeh 45112 | March 23, 1927 |
| 80626 | "John Henry Blues" | Okeh 45101 | March 23, 1927 |
| 80659 | "I Don't Love Nobody" | Okeh 45101 | March 23, 1927 |
| 80660 | "Shortenin' Bread" | Okeh 45112 | March 23, 1927 |
| 56560 | "Rocky Palace" | Victor 40304 | November 22, 1929 |
| 56561 | "Green Mountain" | Victor 40304 | November 22, 1929 |
| 56562 | "Fiddling Rufus" | Victor 40212 | November 22, 1929 |
| 56563 | "Mississippi Sawyer" | Victor 40212 | November 22, 1929 |
| 56564 | "He's a Beauty" | Victor 23638 | November 22, 1929 |
| 56565 | "I Lost My Gal" | Victor 23638 | November 22, 1929 |
| 404614 | "When Roses Bloom Again For the Bootlegger" | Okeh 45545 | December 3, 1930 |
| 404615 | "Buy a Half Pint and Stay In the Wagon Yard" | Okeh 45528 | December 3, 1930 |
| 404616 | "Take Me Back To My Old Mountain Home" | Okeh 45528 | December 3, 1930 |
| 404617 | "There's No Place Like Home" | Okeh 45545 | December 3, 1930 |
| 404618 | "Bringing In the Sheaves" | Okeh 45512 | December 3, 1930 |
| 404619 | "I Know That My Redeemer Liveth" | Okeh 45512 | December 3, 1930 |
| 405044 | "Close Your Bright Eyes" | Okeh 45559 | October 29, 1931 |
| 405045 | "Way Down In Georgia" | Okeh 45559 | October 29, 1931 |

Earl Johnson's Clodhoppers

| Matrix | Title | Record # | Recording date |
|---|---|---|---|
| 81705 | "I Get My Whiskey From Rockingham" | Okeh 45183 | October 7, 1927 |
| 81706 | "Red Hot Breakdown" | Okeh 45209 | October 7, 1927 |
| 81707 | "I've Got a Woman On Sourwood Mountain" | Okeh 45171 | October 7, 1927 |
| 81708 | "All Night Long" | Okeh 45383 | October 7, 1927 |
| 81709 | "Old Grey Mare Kicking Out of the Wilderness" | Okeh 45183 | October 7, 1927 |
| 81710 | "They Don't Roost Too High For Me" | Okeh 45223 | October 7, 1927 |
| 81711 | "Mississippi Jubilee" | Okeh 45223 | October 7, 1927 |
| 81712 | "Leather Breeches" | Okeh 45209 | October 7, 1927 |
| 81743 | "Poor Little Joe" | Okeh 45406 | October 11, 1927 |
| 81744 | "The Little Grave In Georgia" | Okeh 45194 | October 11, 1927 |
| 81745 | "In the Shadow of the Pine" | Okeh 45194 | October 11, 1927 |
| 81746 | "Johnnie, Get Your Gun" | Okeh 45171 | October 11, 1927 |
| 81747 | "Arkansaw Traveler" | Okeh 45156 | October 11, 1927 |
| 81748 | "Twinkle Little Star" | Okeh 45156 | October 11, 1927 |
| 402036 | "Weeping Willow" | Unissued | August 2, 1928 |
| 402037 | "Nigger On the Woodpile" | Okeh 45269 | August 2, 1928 |
| 402038 | "Nigger In the Cotton Patch" | Okeh 45383 | August 2, 1928 |
| 402112 | "Alabama Girl, Ain't You Comin' Out Tonight" | Okeh 45300 | August 9, 1928 |
| 402113 | "Laughing Rufus" | Okeh 45406 | August 9, 1928 |
| 402114 | "G Rag" | Okeh 45300 | August 9, 1928 |
| 402115 | "Wire Grass Drag" | Okeh 45269 | August 9, 1928 |

== Selected discography ==
- Complete Recorded Works, Vol 1 (1927) - Document Records (1997)
- Complete Recorded Works, Vol 2 (1927-1931) - Document Records (1997)
