= Live at McCabe's (Norman Blake album) =

Live album by Norman Blake
- Released: 1976
- Genre: Bluegrass, folk
- Length: 33:26
- Label: Takoma
- Producer: Doug Decker

Norman Blake chronology
Norman Blake/Tut Taylor/Sam Bush/Butch Robins/Vassar Clements/David Holland/Jethro Burns (1975)	Live at McCabe's (1976)	Norman Blake and Red Rector (1976)

Live at McCabe's is an album of American guitarist Norman Blake and Nancy Blake, released in 1975. It was recorded at McCabe's Guitar Shop in Santa Monica, California.

Live at McCabe's was reissued on CD in 1987 along with Directions by Takoma.

== Reception ==
Professional ratings
Review scores
Source	Rating
AllMusic	4.5/5 stars
The Rolling Stone Record Guide	1/5 stars

In his AllMusic review, critic Jim Smith wrote: "Long cherished by Norman Blake's fans as one of the greatest flatpicking albums of all time, Live at McCabe's isn't as essential as some of the guitarist's studio records of the time (see Whiskey Before Breakfast), but there's a warm, ramshackle beauty about this concert that is every bit as charming."

The Rolling Stone Record Guide said, "Blake is a superb guitarist capable of the flashiest, fastest picking this side of Doc Watson. Unfortunately, when Blake is recording as leader, he takes on the additional role as vocalist, a 'talent' of his that is considerably less than adequate. The live disc doesn't justify itself in ambiance or technical levels."

== Track listing ==
1. "Introduction By Nancy Covey" – 0:38
2. "Nine Pound Hammer" (Merle Travis) – 4:07
3. "Sweet Heaven When I Die" (Grant) – 3:59
4. "Introducing Nancy Blake" – 1:10
5. "Border Widow" (Blake) – 2:10
6. ""G" Medley: Green Leaf Fancy/Fields of November/Fort Smith" (Blake, Traditional) – 5:35
7. "Dry Grass on the High Fields" (Blake) – 2:35
8. "John Hardy" (Traditional) – 5:24
9. "Arkansas Traveler" (Traditional) – 2:26
10. "Medley: Bully of the Town/Bonaparte's Retreat/Richland Avenue Rag" (Traditional) – 3:22
11. "Harvey's Reel" (Blake) – 2:00

== Personnel ==
- Norman Blake – guitar, fiddle, vocals
- Nancy Blake – cello

Production notes

- Doug Decker – producer, engineer
- Kirk Felton – remastering
- Absalom Jackson – art direction, original cover artwork
- Jon Monday – art direction, original cover artwork
- Jamie Putnam – art direction
- Deb Sibony – design
