= Norman Blake/Tut Taylor/Sam Bush/Butch Robins/Vassar Clements/David Holland/Jethro Burns =

Studio album by Norman Blake
- Released: 1975
- Recorded: Jun 22, 1974, Nashville, TN
- Genre: Americana, bluegrass, folk
- Length: 36:43
- Label: Flying Fish

Norman Blake chronology
Old and New (1975)	Norman Blake/Tut Taylor/Sam Bush/Butch Robins/Vassar Clements/David Holland/Jethro Burns (1975)	Live at McCabe's (1976)

Norman Blake/Tut Taylor/Sam Bush/Butch Robins/Vassar Clements/David Holland/Jethro Burns is a studio album recorded by American musicians Norman Blake, Tut Taylor, Sam Bush, Butch Robins, Vassar Clements, and Jethro Burns and British bassist Dave Holland. It was released in 1975.

From Hank Deane's original liner notes: "Hey, let's do a record in Nashville with everybody. "And Jethro Burns", says Sam. OK, all right, let's do it. I fly to Nashville to see Claude Hill and we do it."

== Reception ==
Professional ratings
Review scores
Source	Rating
Allmusic	4/5 stars

Ken Dryden, in his AllMusic review states the album "...blur[s] the imaginary lines between jazz and bluegrass even further; after all, a good musician in either field should be a great improviser."

== Track listing ==
Side one
No.	Title	Writer(s)	Length
1.	"Sweet Georgia Brown"	Ben Bernie; Kenneth Casey; Maceo Pinkard	2:53
2.	"Sauerkraut 'n Solar Energy"	Jethro Burns; Vassar Clements; David Holland	7:33
3.	"The Old Brown Case"	Norman Blake	3:58
4.	"Take the "A" Train"	Duke Ellington; Billy Strayhorn	3:36

Side two
No.	Title	Writer(s)	Length
1.	"Going Home"	Antonín Dvořák	3:02
2.	"McKinley's Blues"	Traditional	4:21
3.	"Oconee"	Tut Taylor	5:26
4.	"Vassar and Dave"	Clements; Holland	5:54

== Personnel ==
- Norman Blake – guitar, mandocello, vocals
- Vassar Clements – violin
- Jethro Burns – guitar, mandolin
- Butch Robins – banjo
- Tut Taylor – dobro, mandolin
- Sam Bush – mandola, mandolin
- David Holland – bass

=== Production ===
- Claude J. Hill – engineer
- Jim McGuire – photography
- Hank Deane – liner notes
