= While Passing Along This Way =

Studio album by Norman Blake, Nancy Blake
- Released: 1994
- Genres: Americana, bluegrass, folk
- Label: Shanachie
- Producers: Norman Blake, Nancy Blake

Norman Blake chronology
Just Gimme Somethin' I'm Used To (1992)	While Passing Along This Way (1994)	The Hobo's Last Ride (1996)

Professional ratings
Review scores
Source	Rating
Allmusic	2.5/5 stars

While Passing Along This Way is an album of American musicians Norman Blake and Nancy Blake, released in 1994. It was nominated for a Grammy Award for Best Traditional Folk Album.

== Track listing ==
1. "He's Passing This Way" (Wade Mainer) – 3:12
2. "I'm Going to Leave Old Dixie" – 4:09
3. "Bonaparte Crossing the Rhine/Going Down the Valley" (Traditional) – 4:42
4. "The Grave of Bonaparte" (Blake, Traditional) – 4:36
5. "On & On & On" (Blake, Blake) – 3:06
6. "The Greenwood Tree" (Traditional) – 1:52
7. "Sweet Freedom" (Traditional) – 3:45
8. "Sweet Heaven" (Traditional) – 2:26
9. "God's Radio Phone" (Mainer) – 4:36
10. "Old Mother Flanagan" (Blake, Traditional) – 3:03
11. "Last Train from Poor Valley" (Blake, Blake) – 3:44
12. "Hangin' Dog" (Blake) – 2:47
13. "The Fate of Talmage" (Traditional) – 3:36
14. "Old Stepstone" (Blake, Traditional) – 3:53

== Personnel ==
- Norman Blake – guitar, mandolin, vocals
- Nancy Blake – guitar, mandolin, vocals
