= Bill Monroe Sings Bluegrass, Body and Soul =

Studio album by Bill Monroe and his Blue Grass Boys
- Released: January 10, 1977
- Recorded: April 29, 1969; October 28, 1969; January 20, 1971; March 21, 1972; October 20 and 21, 1976
- Studio: Columbia Recording Studio (Nashville, Tennessee); Bradley's Barn (Mount Juliet, Tennessee)
- Genre: Bluegrass; gospel
- Length: 25:24
- Label: MCA
- Producer: Walter Haynes; Owen Bradley; Harry Silverstein

Bill Monroe chronology
The Weary Traveler (1976)	Bill Monroe Sings Bluegrass, Body and Soul (1977)	Bluegrass Memories (1977)

Singles from Bill Monroe Sings Bluegrass, Body and Soul
- 1. "Walk Softly on This Heart of Mine" Released: March 9, 1970; 2. "My Old Kentucky and You" Released: May 15, 1972; 3. "My Sweet Blue-Eyed Darlin'" Released: January 17, 1977

Bill Monroe Sings Bluegrass, Body and Soul is the 12th studio album by American bluegrass musician Bill Monroe and his band, the Blue Grass Boys. Released by MCA Records on January 10, 1977, it features six songs recorded in October 1976 and four taken from sessions between 1969 and 1972, three of which were previously released on singles or B-sides. One single was released from the new sessions: "My Sweet Blue-Eyed Darlin'" backed with "Monroe's Blues" on January 17, 1977.

== Background ==
Six of the ten songs on Bill Monroe Sings Bluegrass, Body and Soul were recorded over two sessions on October 20 and 21, 1976. The lineup for these sessions included the Blue Grass Boys lineup of guitarist Wayne Lewis, banjo player Bill Holden (both of whom had joined in the last few months), fiddler Kenny Baker and bassist Randy Davis, in addition to James Monroe on second guitar, Joe Stuart on second fiddle and Baker's protégé Blaine Sprouse on third fiddle. The first session saw the group recording Flatt and Scruggs' "My Cabin in Caroline", the folk standard "No Place to Pillow My Head", and the new original "My Sweet Blue-Eyed Darlin'", which was written in reference to Monroe's latest love interest, Julia LaBella. The latter two tracks featured a vocal trio, with Lewis performing lead vocals.

The band started the next day's session with the mandolin-led instrumental "Monroe's Blues", which had originated from Monroe "noodling around" on the group's tour bus several months earlier, and named by previous Blue Grass Boys banjo player Bob Black. After an "unsuccessful attempt" at a new version of "The First Whippoorwill" (with James Monroe on lead vocal), the group recorded another new composition, "Lucky Lady", which a friend of Monroe's claims was inspired by another love interest of the bandleader — a claim which he denied. The final song recorded at the session was another track written about a woman, "My Louisiana Love", who Monroe biographer Tom Ewing claims "refused [Monroe's] advances". This was the third song to feature a vocal trio — Davis on lead, Monroe on tenor and Stuart on baritone.

The rest of the album was made up of slightly older recordings. Virginia Stauffer's "With Body and Soul", which inspired the title of the album, comes from a session on April 29, 1969, which featured James Monroe, banjo player Rual Yarbrough, Baker, guest fiddler Tommy Williams, and session bassist Joe Zinkan. It was originally issued as the B-side to "Fireball Mail" later that year. "Walk Softly on This Heart of Mine", written by Monroe with Jake Landers, was recorded on October 28, 1969, with Joe "Red" Hayes in place of Williams and Bill Yates in place of Zinkan. It was initially released as a standalone single on March 9, 1970. "Milenburg Joy" comes from January 20, 1971, the last session for 1972's Uncle Pen, featuring Bobby Thompson on banjo, Buddy Spicher on second fiddle and Stuart on bass; and "My Old Kentucky and You" was recorded on March 21, 1972, with bassist Monroe Fields singing lead, Stuart on guitar, Jack Hicks on banjo, and Williams on second fiddle.

== Release ==
Bill Monroe Sings Bluegrass, Body and Soul was released by MCA Records on January 10, 1977. "My Sweet Blue-Eyed Darlin'", backed with "Monroe's Blues", followed as the sole single from the October 1976 sessions a week later.

== Reception ==
Cash Box magazine published a positive review of Bill Monroe Sings Bluegrass, Body and Soul. They called the album "a complete bluegrass package", praising "Walk Softly on This Heart of Mine" and "With Body and Soul" as "the LP's two strongest entries yet" and hailing "Milenburg Joy" as a "fresh uptempo bluegrass instrumental [which] helps balance the album's ... variety". It reached the top 50 of the Record World Country Album Chart in February 1977.

== Track listing ==
Bill Monroe Sings Bluegrass, Body and Soul track listing
No.	Title	Writer(s)	Length
1.	"My Sweet Blue-Eyed Darlin'" (recorded October 20, 1976)	Bill Monroe	2:06
2.	"Milenburg Joy" (recorded January 20, 1971)	Jelly Roll Morton; Leon Roppolo; Paul Mares; Walter Melrose	2:12
3.	"My Louisiana Love" (recorded October 21, 1976)	Monroe	2:02
4.	"Monroe's Blues" (recorded October 21, 1976)	Monroe	3:50
5.	"No Place to Pillow My Head" (recorded October 20, 1976)	Traditional	2:16
6.	"My Cabin in Caroline" (recorded October 20, 1976)	Lester Flatt; Earl Scruggs	2:29
7.	"Walk Softly on This Heart of Mine" (recorded October 28, 1969)	Monroe; Jake Landers	2:33
8.	"Lucky Lady" (recorded October 21, 1976)	Monroe	2:30
9.	"With Body and Soul" (recorded April 29, 1969)	Virginia Stauffer	3:04
10.	"My Old Kentucky and You" (recorded March 21, 1972)	Monroe	2:14
Total length:			25:24

== Personnel ==
Tracks 7 and 9 (recorded April/October 1969)

- Bill Monroe — mandolin, vocals (lead on both; tenor on track 7)
- James Monroe — guitar, lead vocals (track 7)
- Rual Yarbrough — banjo, baritone vocals (track 7)
- Kenny Baker — fiddle
- Joe "Red" Hayes — fiddle (track 7)
- Tommy Williams — fiddle (track 9)
- Bill Yates — string bass (track 7)
- Joe Zinkan — string bass (track 9)

Track 10 (recorded March 21, 1972)

- Bill Monroe — mandolin, tenor vocals
- Joe Stuart — guitar, baritone vocals
- Jack Hicks — banjo
- Kenny Baker — fiddle
- Tommy Williams — fiddle
- Monroe Fields — string bass, lead vocals

Track 2 (recorded January 20, 1971)

- Bill Monroe — mandolin
- James Monroe — guitar
- Bobby Thompson — banjo
- Kenny Baker — fiddle
- Norman "Buddy" Spicher — fiddle
- Joe Stuart — string bass

Tracks 1, 3–6 and 8 (recorded October 20/21, 1976)

- Bill Monroe — mandolin, vocals (lead on tracks 5 and 6; tenor on tracks 1, 3 and 5)
- Wayne Lewis — guitar, lead vocals (tracks 1 and 5)
- James Monroe — guitar
- Bill Holden — banjo
- Kenny Baker — fiddle
- Joe Stuart — fiddle, baritone vocals (tracks 1 and 3)
- Blaine Sprouse — fiddle
- Randy Davis — string bass, vocals (lead on track 3; baritone on track 5)

== Bibliography ==
- Ewing, Tom (September 7, 2018), Bill Monroe: The Life and Music of the Blue Grass Man (Music in American Life), Champaign, Illinois: University of Illinois Press, ISBN 978-0252041891
- Rosenberg, Neil V.; Wolfe, Charles K. (June 7, 2007), The Music of Bill Monroe: Music in American Life, Champaign, Illinois: University of Illinois Press, ISBN 978-0252031212
