= Directions (Norman Blake album) =

Studio album by Norman Blake
- Released: 1978
- Genre: Americana, bluegrass, folk
- Label: Takoma

Norman Blake chronology
Blackberry Blossom (1977)	Directions (1978)	Rising Fawn String Ensemble (1979)

Professional ratings
Review scores
Source	Rating
Allmusic	4/5 stars

Directions is an album of American guitarist Norman Blake, released in 1978. It was reissued in 1987 on CD along with Live at McCabe's by Takoma.

== Track listing ==
1. "Blue Ridge Mountain Blues"
2. "Thebes"
3. "The L & N Don't Stop Here Anymore"
4. "Medley: Loch Lavan Castle/Santa Ana's Retreat/Cattle in the Cane"
5. "Poor Ellen Smith"
6. "Uncle Sam"
7. "Ice on the Road"
8. "Rake and the Rambling Blade"
9. "High Dad in the Morning"
10. "Father's Hall"
11. "White Horse Breakdown"
12. "'76 Blues"

== Personnel ==
- Norman Blake – guitar, mandolin, mando-cello, vocals, fiddle
- Nancy Blake - cello, guitar, mandolin, vocals
- Miles Anderson - alto trombone, tenor trombone, bass trumpet, baritone horn, bass trombone
- Joseph Byrd - arranging [Horns] (Uncle Sam)
- George Belle - engineer
