= Go Long Mule =

Compilation album by Uncle Dave Macon
- Released: 1972
- Genre: Country
- Label: County Records

Go Long Mule is an album by Uncle Dave Macon that was released in 1972.

== Reception ==
Professional ratings
Review scores
Source	Rating
AllMusic	4/5 stars

Matt Fink of Allmusic called it a "A wild romp through 18 tracks recorded during Uncle Dave Macon's heyday period of 1926 through 1934, Go Long Mule is uniformly strong if not exceptionally complete. These are some of the most vibrant examples of old-timey music likely to be found."

== Track listing ==
1. "Over The Road I'm Bound To Go" (July 25, 1928)
2. "I'm Goin' Away In The Morn" (May 9, 1927)
3. "Go Long Mule" (May 9, 1927)
4. "Oh Baby, You Done Me Wrong" (December 17, 1930)
5. "Jordan Am A Hard Road To Travel" (May 9, 1927)
6. "Grey Cat On The Tennessee Farm" (May 9, 1927)
7. "Over The Mountain" (June 21, 1929)
8. "Hold The Woodpile Down" (May 7, 1927)
9. "Backwater Blues" (May 11, 1927)
10. "Don't Get Weary Children" (August 15, 1934)
11. "She's Got The Money, Too" (December 17, 1930)
12. "Way Down The Old Plank Road" (April 14, 1926)
13. "Carve That Possum" (May 7, 1927)
14. "Old Ties" (April 17, 1926)
15. "Tom And Jerry" (May 9, 1927)
16. "Rock About Saro Jane" (May 7, 1927)
17. "Rabbit In The Pea Patch" (May 9, 1927)
18. "Sail Away Ladies" (May 7, 1927)
