= Be Ready Boys: Appalachia to Abilene =

Studio album by Norman Blake, Rich O'Brien
- Released: 1999
- Genre: Americana, bluegrass, folk
- Label: Shanachie
- Producer: Norman Blake

Norman Blake chronology
Chattanooga Sugar Babe (1998)	Be Ready Boys: Appalachia to Abilene (1999)	Far Away, Down on a Georgia Farm (1999)

Professional ratings
Review scores
Source	Rating
Allmusic	link

Be Ready Boys: Appalachia to Abilene is an album by the American musicians Norman Blake and Rich O'Brien, released in 1999.

== Track listing ==
1. "Tennessee Wagoner" (Traditional) – 3:22
2. "Old Pal of Yesterday" (W. S. Stevenson) – 4:29
3. "Texola Waltz" (Blake) – 2:23
4. "When It's Lamplighting Time in the Valley" (Traditional) – 3:37
5. "Bowling Green Rag" (Blake) – 2:33
6. "Homestead on the Farm" (A. P. Carter) – 3:30
7. "Mexico" (Bryant) – 2:25
8. "Going Home" (Antonín Dvořák, Traditional) – 3:39
9. "Kentucky's Your Home" (Blake) – 3:14
10. "Under the Double Eagle" (Traditional) – 4:08
11. "Grandpa's Barn" (Richard O'Brien) – 4:25
12. "Seamus O'Brien" (Traditional) – 3:45
13. "Flop-Eared Mule" (Traditional) – 4:05
14. "A Maiden's Prayer" (Bob Wills) – 3:32
15. "Callahan" (Traditional) – 2:13
16. "Heavenly Sunlight" (G. H. Cook, H. J. Zelley) – 3:45

== Personnel ==
- Norman Blake – guitar, banjo, fiddle, vocals
- Rich O'Brien – guitar, mandolin, vocals
- Don Edwards – guitar
