= Red Rector =

American musician

- Born: William Eugene Rector; December 15, 1929; Marshall, North Carolina
- Died: May 31, 1990 (aged 60) Knoxville, Tennessee
- Genres: Bluegrass music
- Occupation: American bluegrass musician
- Instrument: Mandolin

William Eugene Rector (also known as Red Rector) (December 15, 1929 - May 31, 1990) was an American Bluegrass musician who primarily played mandolin.

== Biography ==
Rector was born on December 15, 1929, in Marshall, North Carolina. His parents both sang in a church quartet and his early influences included Gospel music. He began playing in bands at the age of twelve and at thirteen joined the United States Navy after lying about his age, but was discharged after his true age was discovered. Rector played with J. E. and Wade Mainer in 1944 on the radio show The Old Chisholm Trail. He also played with musicians such as Woody Guthrie, Burl Ives, Cisco Houston, and Lilly May Ledford.

Rector met Bill Clifton in the 1970s and toured with him as part of the band First Generation along with Don Stover. Clifton heard Rector playing at the Indian Springs Festival and joined him in a jam session. Clifton recruited Rector the next day to travel overseas. In 1974, he became part of the group Red and Bill along with Bill Monroe, recording music for several record labels in both Europe and the United States. Throughout his career he also played with Carl Story, Charlie Monroe, and Frank Hylo Brown

Rector died on May 31, 1990, in Knoxville, Tennessee.

== Select discography ==
- 1969, Songs From the Heart of the Country (LP)
- 1976, Norman Blake and Red Rector (album)
