= Blackberry Blossom =

Studio album by Norman Blake
- Released: 1977
- Genre: Americana, bluegrass, folk
- Label: Flying Fish
- Producer: Norman Blake

Norman Blake chronology
Whiskey Before Breakfast (1976)	Blackberry Blossom (1977)	Directions (1978)

Blackberry Blossom is an album by American guitarist Norman Blake, released in 1977.

== Reception ==
Professional ratings
Review scores
Source	Rating
Allmusic	4.5/5 stars

Writing for Allmusic, critic Ronnie D. Lankford, Jr. noted that Blake "imbeds himself in tradition, offering honest interpretations and fresh originals that are respectful of their roots. In this way, his true artistry grows each time the listener places a disc like Blackberry Blossom in the CD player. To those familiar with Blake, this re-issue will be warmly welcomed; for the unfamiliar, Blackberry Blossom is a great place to get started."

== Track listing ==
1. "Are You from Dixie?" (George L. Cobb, Jack Yellen) – 3:40
2. "The Rights Of Man Hornpipe" – 2:35
3. "The Highland Light" (Blake) – 5:16
4. "Railroad Blues" (Traditional) – 8:02
5. "Foggy Valley" (Traditional) – 2:31
6. "Lonesome Jenny" (Blake) – 7:21
7. "Blackberry Blossom" (Traditional) – 3:33
8. "D Medley" (Traditional) – 5:26
9. "Jerusalem Ridge" (Monroe) – 3:46

== Personnel ==
- Norman Blake – guitar, mandolin, violin, vocals
- Nancy Blake – guitar, cello

Production notes

- Dr. Toby Mountain – mastering
