= Whiskey Before Breakfast =

Studio album by Norman Blake
- Released: 1976
- Genre: Americana, bluegrass, folk
- Length: 43:40
- Label: Rounder
- Producer: Norman Blake

Norman Blake chronology
Norman Blake and Red Rector (1976)	Whiskey Before Breakfast (1976)	Blackberry Blossom (1977)

Whiskey Before Breakfast is an album of American guitarist Norman Blake, released in 1976.

== Reception ==
Professional ratings
Review scores
Source	Rating
AllMusic	5/5 stars

Writing for AllMusic, critic Jim Smith gave the release five of five stars, writing "All told, there have been many albums in the folk idiom featuring many a guitar virtuoso, but very few achieve such a mix of relaxed subtlety and eye-popping virtuosity, and Whiskey Before Breakfast will perhaps stand as the greatest achievement by this master picker."

== Track listing ==
1. "Hand Me Down My Walking Cane" (James A. Bland) – 3:28
2. "Under the Double Eagle" (Josef Wagner) – 2:44
3. "Six White Horses" (Traditional) – 5:00
4. "Salt River" – 1:39
5. "Old Grey Mare" (Traditional) – 3:31
6. "Down at Milow's House" (Blake) – 1:20
7. "Sleepy Eyed Joe/Indian Creek " (Traditional) – 3:38
8. "Arkansas Traveler" (Traditional) – 3:04
9. "The Girl I Left in Sunny Tennessee" (Traditional) – 2:54
10. "The Minstrel Boy to the War Has Gone/The Ash Grove" – 3:02
11. "Church Street Blues" (Blake) – 2:55
12. "Macon Rag" (Blake) – 2:44
13. "Fiddler's Dram/Whiskey Before Breakfast" (Traditional) – 3:34
14. "Slow Train Through Georgia" (Blake) – 4:07

== Personnel ==
- Norman Blake – guitar, vocals
- Charlie Collins – guitar

Production notes

- Douglas Parker – cover design
- J.D. Sloan – photography
- Sundance – engineer
