= Slow Train Through Georgia =

Slow Train through Georgia

Compilation album by Norman Blake
- Released: 1987
- Genre: Americana, bluegrass, folk
- Length: 69:35
- Label: Rounder

Norman Blake chronology
Natasha's Waltz (1987)	Slow Train through Georgia (1987)	Blake & Rice (1987)

Professional ratings
Review scores
Source	Rating
Allmusic	link

Slow Train through Georgia is a compilation album of American guitarist Norman Blake, released in 1987. It contains songs from Blake's releases in the 1970s.

It was rated four out of five stars by AllMusic.

== Track listing ==
1. "Fiddler's Dram/Whiskey Before Breakfast" (Traditional) – 3:31
2. "Slow Train Through Georgia" (Norman Blake) – 4:06
3. "Old Grey Mare" (Traditional) – 3:29
4. "Down Home Summertime Blues" (Blake) – 3:40
5. "Spanish Fandango" (Traditional) – 3:47
6. "Randall Collins" (Blake) – 1:52
7. "Church Street Blues" (Blake) – 2:52
8. "Done Gone" (Traditional) – 1:36
9. "Bully of the Town" (Traditional) – 2:00
10. "Nashville Blues" (Alton Delmore) – 3:45
11. "Ginseng Sullivan" (Blake) – 3:29
12. "Macon Rag" (Blake) – 2:41
13. "Nobody's Business" (Traditional) – 3:13
14. "The Streamlined Cannonball" (Traditional) – 4:57
15. "Cattle in the Cane" (Traditional) – 2:10
16. "Little Joe" (Traditional) – 2:36
17. "Weave and Way" (Traditional) – 2:23
18. "Six White Horses" (Traditional) – 4:56
19. "Richland Avenue (Front Porch Wood Pile) Rag" (Blake) – 1:54
20. "The Banks of Good Hope/The Green Fields of America" (Traditional) – 5:53
21. "Columbus Stockade Blues" (Traditional) – 3:28
22. "Down at Mylow's House" (Blake) – 1:17

== Personnel ==
- Norman Blake – vocals, guitar, mandolin
- Nancy Blake – cello
- Charlie Collins – fiddle, guitar
- Peter Ostroushko – fiddle, mandolin
- Mick Moloney – banjo
- Eugene O'Donnell – fiddle
- Tut Taylor – dobro
