= Bill Clifton =

American bluegrass musician and singer (1931–2026)

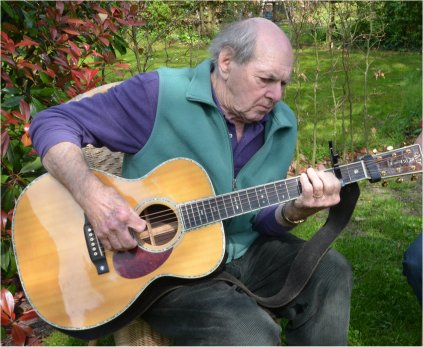
- Clifton in 2017

Background information
- Born: William August Marburg; April 5, 1931; Riderwood, Maryland, U.S.
- Died: October 30, 2026 (aged 95) Mendota, Virginia, U.S.
- Genres: Bluegrass, folk
- Occupations: Musician, guitarist, singer, songwriter
- Instruments: Guitar, autoharp
- Years active: 1952–2026
- Labels: Blue Ridge, Starday, Mercury, County, Elf

William August Marburg (April 5, 1931 – October 30, 2026), better known as Bill Clifton, was an American bluegrass musician and singer who was credited with having organized one of the first bluegrass festivals in the United States in 1961.

== Early life ==
Born and raised on a farm in Riderwood, Maryland, United States, Clifton's family prospered in the tobacco trade during the nineteenth century. From an early age, he discovered his love for country music through the radio and records. Clifton began singing and playing the guitar by age 12.

== Early music career ==
His education spanned private schools from New England to Florida. Eventually, he enrolled at the University of Virginia in 1949 where his love for country music expanded to folk music through fellow students, Paul Clayton and Dave Sadler. While still in college, Clifton, Clayton, and Sadler formed the Dixie Mountain Boys together and began playing professionally at small radio stations in central Virginia. Because his family was opposed to his musical activities, he took the stage name "Bill Clifton". With the help of his friends and bandmates, Clifton produced his first recording in 1952 that included an array of old-time, bluegrass, and folk revival repertoire. Clifton met banjo player Johnny Clark through Sadler and soon formed a band that began playing on many local radio stations (including WWVA). In 1953, the band signed with Blue Ridge Records and began playing traditional bluegrass. They soon appeared on the Wheeling Jamboree radio barn dance show on AM station WWVA. Clifton published a songbook in 1955 called 150 Old Time Folk and Gospel Songs, which soon became one of the most influential songbooks of its time. His songbook included many songs such as "Little Maggie", "I'll Be All Smiles Tonight", "Long Journey Home", and "Little Whitewashed Chimney". Because of the popularity of Clifton's songbook, these songs quickly became recognizable standards in the bluegrass world. During this time, Clifton met and played music with artists such as A.P. Carter, The Stanley Brothers, and Woody Guthrie, to name just a few. He had many connections throughout old-time, bluegrass, country, and folk music - which reflected his unique repertoire and sound. His singing style was deemed to have more of a folk revivalist influence rather than a "hillbilly" sound - which was the popular sound of the previous years. Because the instrumental style of his band had more of a "contemporary bluegrass" sound along with his "folk revivalist" vocals, he was deemed one of the first "city-billies" in bluegrass music.

== Later music career ==
After enlisting for two years in the Marine Corps, in 1956, Clifton re-entered the music business. The Stanley Brothers introduced Clifton to Dee Kilpatrick, who was Mercury's A&R man located in Nashville, and he invited Clifton to record for Mercury Records. However, by the time Clifton was ready to record, Kilpatrick had moved on from Mercury Records in order to take over WSM Artists' Service Bureau manager position. Therefore, he referred Clifton to Pierce who was interested, but said that Mercury-Starday would not finance the recording. With the help of Ralph Stanley and two of the Clinch Mountain Boys, Clifton put together his own studio band. In 1956, Clifton paid for the recording time in RCA studios to cut four songs with this band. In 1957, Clifton released two of these songs to Starday, who issued them on a "trial basis". The overall record sold very well and received a lot of exposure from WWVA. The success of his release helped Clifton to be moved to Mercury-Starday for his next session in Nashville of April 1957.

On July 4, 1961, Clifton organized one of the first bluegrass festivals at Oak Leaf Park in Luray, Virginia, (an earlier one-day event had taken place at Watermelon Park near Berryville, Virginia, on August 14, 1960). The festival featured many of the biggest acts of the day in bluegrass music including Bill Monroe, the Stanley Brothers, Jim & Jesse, Red Allen, Frank Wakefield & The Kentuckians, Mac Wiseman and the Country Gentlemen. In 1963, Clifton's family moved to England and he toured all over Europe playing in local folk clubs. In 1963 while in London, he recorded 1 song in front of a live television audience for the UK regional television folk and blues music series Hullabaloo, presented by the Scottish folksinger Rory McEwen; these sessions were released on DVD in 2020.In 1967, he joined the Peace Corps, serving three years in the Philippines. Meanwhile, he recorded with a local New Zealand band, The Hamilton County Bluegrass Band. In later years, he recorded both in Europe and in the United States. In the 1970s, he signed with County Records and formed the First Generation band, consisting of Clifton on guitar, Red Rector on mandolin and Don Stover on banjo. Clifton and his family returned to the United States in 1978 and settled down in Virginia. In 1980, he began recording for his own label Elf Records. In 2008 he was inducted into the International Bluegrass Music Association's Hall of Fame.

== Death ==
Clifton died in Mendota, Virginia, on October 30, 2026, at the age of 95.

== Selected discography ==
- Mountain Folk Songs – Starday Records (1960)
- Carter Family Memorial Album – Starday Records (1961)
- Bluegrass Sound Of – Starday Records (1962)
- Soldier, Sing Me a Song – Starday Records (1963)
- Code of the Mountains – Starday Records (1964)
- Mountain Bluegrass Songs – Nashville Records (1964)
- Wanderin' – Hillbilly Records (1964)
- Bluegrass in the American Tradition – Nashville Records (1965)
- Are You from Dixie – Bear Family Records (1971)
- Getting Folk – Bear Family Records (1972)
- Blue Ridge Mountain Blues – County Records (1973)
- Come by the Hills – County Records (1975)
- Bluegrass Session 1952 – Bear Family Records (1975)
- Going Back to Dixie – Bear Family Records (1975)
- Another Happy Day – Bear Family Records (1976)
- Are You from Dixie – Bear Family Records (1977)
- Clifton & Company – County Records (1977)
- Autoharp Centennial Celebration – Elf Records (1981)
- Beatle Crazy – Bear Family Records (1983)
- Where the Rainbow Finds Its End – Elf Records (1991)
- The Early Years 1957–1958 – Rounder Records (1992)
- River of Memories – Elf Records (1994)
- Around the World to Poor Valley – Bear Family Records (2001)
- Alive – Elf Records (2001)
- Playing Where the Grass Is Greener – Elf Records (2003)
- Mountain Laurel – Elf Records (2004)
