= Rising Fawn Gathering =

Studio album by Norman Blake
- Released: January 20, 2009
- Recorded: October 2007
- Genre: Americana, Celtic, folk
- Label: Plectrafone/Western Jubilee Recording Co.
- Producer: Norman Blake, Nancy Blake

Norman Blake chronology
Shacktown Road (2007)	Rising Fawn Gathering (2009)	Sleepy Eyed Joe (2009)

Rising Fawn Gathering is an album by Americana and folk musicians Norman Blake, Nancy Blake, James and Rachel Bryan and the Celtic music group Boys of the Lough, released in 2009.

== Track listing ==
All songs traditional unless otherwise noted.

1. "Shacktown Road" – 4:34
2. "The Sweet Sunny South" (W. L. Bloomfield) – 5:54
3. "O'Connell's Trip to Parliament/The Twin Katies" – 2:51
4. "Castleberry's March" (Norman Blake) – 3:11
5. "Da Unst Bridal March" (Traditional) – 2:59
6. "The Stockton & Redesdale Hornpipes" – 3:29
7. "The El Paso Waltz" (Dave Richardson) – 2:57
8. "The Bonny Bunch of Roses" – 5:56
9. "Joe Bane's/The Gypsy Princess" – 4:07
10. "The Teelin March" – 3:46
11. "Eamon an Chnoic (Ned of the Hill)" – 3:02
12. "When the Band Is Playing Dixie" – 4:59
13. "Derry So Fair" – 6:02

== Personnel ==
- Norman Blake – guitar, mandolin, dobro
- Nancy Blake – guitar, mandolin, cello, mandola
- Malcolm Stitt – guitar
- James Bryan – fiddle
- Rachel Bryan- guitar, fiddle, mandolin
- Brendan Begley – accordion
- Cathal McConnell – flute, whistle
- Dave Richardson – concertina, mandolin

Production notes:

- Norman Blake – producer
- Nancy Blake – producer
- Scott O'Malley – executive producer, design
- Butch Hause – engineer, mixing
- David Glasser – mastering
- Victoria Ward – design
- Kathleen Fox Collins – design
