= Chattanooga Sugar Babe =

- Cover art depicting three women standing on Main Street in 1895 Black River Falls, Wisconsin

Studio album by Norman Blake
- Released: January 20, 1998
- Genre: Americana, bluegrass, folk
- Label: Shanachie
- Producer: Norman Blake

Norman Blake chronology
The Hobo's Last Ride (1996)	Chattanooga Sugar Babe (1998)	Be Ready Boys: Appalachia to Abilene (1999)

Professional ratings
Review scores
Source	Rating
AllMusic	3/5 stars

Chattanooga Sugar Babe is an album by the American musician Norman Blake, released in 1998.

The album was nominated for a Grammy Award, in the "Best Traditional Folk Album" category.

== Critical reception ==
The Charleston Gazette called the album "dark, brooding, and brilliant," writing that Blake "plays and sings with a rough, reedy power closer in spirit to the dark holler laments of Bascom Lamar Lunsford and Dock Boggs than anyone currently living."

== Track listing ==
All songs by Norman Blake unless otherwise noted.

1. "The Rescue from Moose River Goldmine" (Traditional) – 3:53
2. "The Weathered Old Caboose Behind the Train" – 4:13
3. "Ol' Bill Miner (The Gentleman Bandit)" – 5:56
4. "Poor Old Dad" (Traditional) – 3:01
5. "Chattanooga Sugar Babe" – 6:00
6. "Platonia, the Pride of the Plains" (Traditional) – 5:13
7. "Dr. Edmundo's Favorite Portuguese Waltz" – 4:37
8. "The Founding of the Famous C.P.R." (Traditional) – 6:51
9. "Paramount" – 6:25
10. "Keep Smiling Old Pal" (Traditional) – 4:10
11. "Balmullo House/Broke Down Gambler" (Traditional) – 3:22
12. "Ragtime Texas" – 3:23
13. "Chattanooga Rag" – 3:50
14. "Dixie Flyer Blues" (Traditional) – 4:06

== Personnel ==
- Norman Blake – guitar, mandolin, banjo, fiddle, vocals
