= Far Away, Down on a Georgia Farm =

Studio album by Norman Blake
- Released: 1999
- Genre: Americana, bluegrass, folk
- Length: 69:53
- Label: Shanachie
- Producer: Norman Blake

Norman Blake chronology
Be Ready Boys: Appalachia to Abilene (1999)	Far Away, Down on a Georgia Farm (1999)	Flower From the Fields of Alabama (2001)

Professional ratings
Review scores
Source	Rating
AllMusic	3/5 stars

Far Away, Down on a Georgia Farm is an album of American musician Norman Blake, released in 1999.

== Track listing ==
1. "New Century Hornpipe" (Traditional) – 2:19
2. "Whiskey Deaf and Whiskey Blind" (Norman Blake) – 3:47
3. "Far Away, Down on a Georgia Farm" (Blake) – 4:41
4. "Goin' Back to the Blue Ridge Mountains" (Alton Delmore) – 4:22
5. "Savannah Rag" (Blake) – 5:57
6. "Pasquale Taraffo's First Night in Leadville" (Traditional) – 2:44
7. "The Winds of Time Won't Change" (Blake) – 4:42
8. "Rag Baby Jig" (Traditional) – 3:49
9. "Thelma Hatfield" (Blake) – 4:17
10. "Constitution March" (Traditional) – 3:15
11. "Faded Flowers in Old Love Letters" (Blake) – 5:08
12. "And the Cat Came Back the Very Next Day" (Traditional) – 3:09
13. "Just Another Faded Love Song" (Blake) – 4:35
14. "Give Me Back My Fifteen Cents" (Traditional) – 4:11
15. "Snowbird on the Ashbank" (Traditional) – 2:16
16. "The Wandering Drummer" (Traditional) – 2:56
17. "The Maple on the Hill" (Gussie Davis) – 4:58
18. "Headlight Reel" (Traditional) – 2:47

== Personnel ==
- Norman Blake – guitar, banjo, dobro, mandolin, vocals
