= The Morning Glory Ramblers =

Studio album by Norman Blake and Nancy Blake
- Released: April 20, 2004
- Recorded: August 3–7, 2003
- Genre: Americana, folk
- Label: Dualtone

Norman Blake chronology
Meeting on Southern Soil (2002)	The Morning Glory Ramblers (2004)	Back Home in Sulphur Springs (2006)

Professional ratings
Review scores
Source	Rating
Allmusic	link

The Morning Glory Ramblers is an album by Americana and folk musicians Norman Blake and Nancy Blake, released in 2004. It is the first for the husband and wife duo in eight years.

== Track listing ==
All songs Traditional unless otherwise noted.

1. "The Sunny Side of Life" – 3:20
2. "Dark & Stormy Weather" – 3:42
3. "Precious Memories (Was a Song I Used to Hear)" (Jerry Faires) – 3:47
4. "The Little Log Hut in the Lane" – 2:34
5. "All the Good Times Are Over" – 4:34
6. "We Are Climbing" (J. R. Baxter, Wilbur Wilson) – 4:00
7. "Going Down the Valley" – 3:42
8. "I Loved You Better Than You Knew" (Johnny Carroll) – 3:14
9. "When the Roses Bloom in Dixieland" (George Evans) – 4:26
10. "I Ain't Got Time" (Buford Abner) – 3:08
11. "The Wayworn Traveler" (John Matthias) – 4:23
12. "Rise When the Rooster Crows" – 3:07
13. "Short Life of Trouble" – 5:12
14. "Elijah's God" – 2:50
15. "Fame Apart from God's Approval (Sweeping Thru the Gate)" – 4:14
16. "Dry Bones" – 3:35
17. "Men With Broken Hearts" (Hank Williams) – 3:22

== Personnel ==
- Norman Blake – guitar, mandolin, vocals, dobro
- Nancy Blake – guitar, vocals

== Production notes ==
- Norman Blake – mixing, arranger
- Nancy Blake – mixing
- Butch Hause – engineer, mixing
- David Glasser – mastering
- Donald Kallaus – photography
