= Brevard-Macon House =

Historic house in Tennessee, United States

- Brevard--Macon House
- U.S. National Register of Historic Places
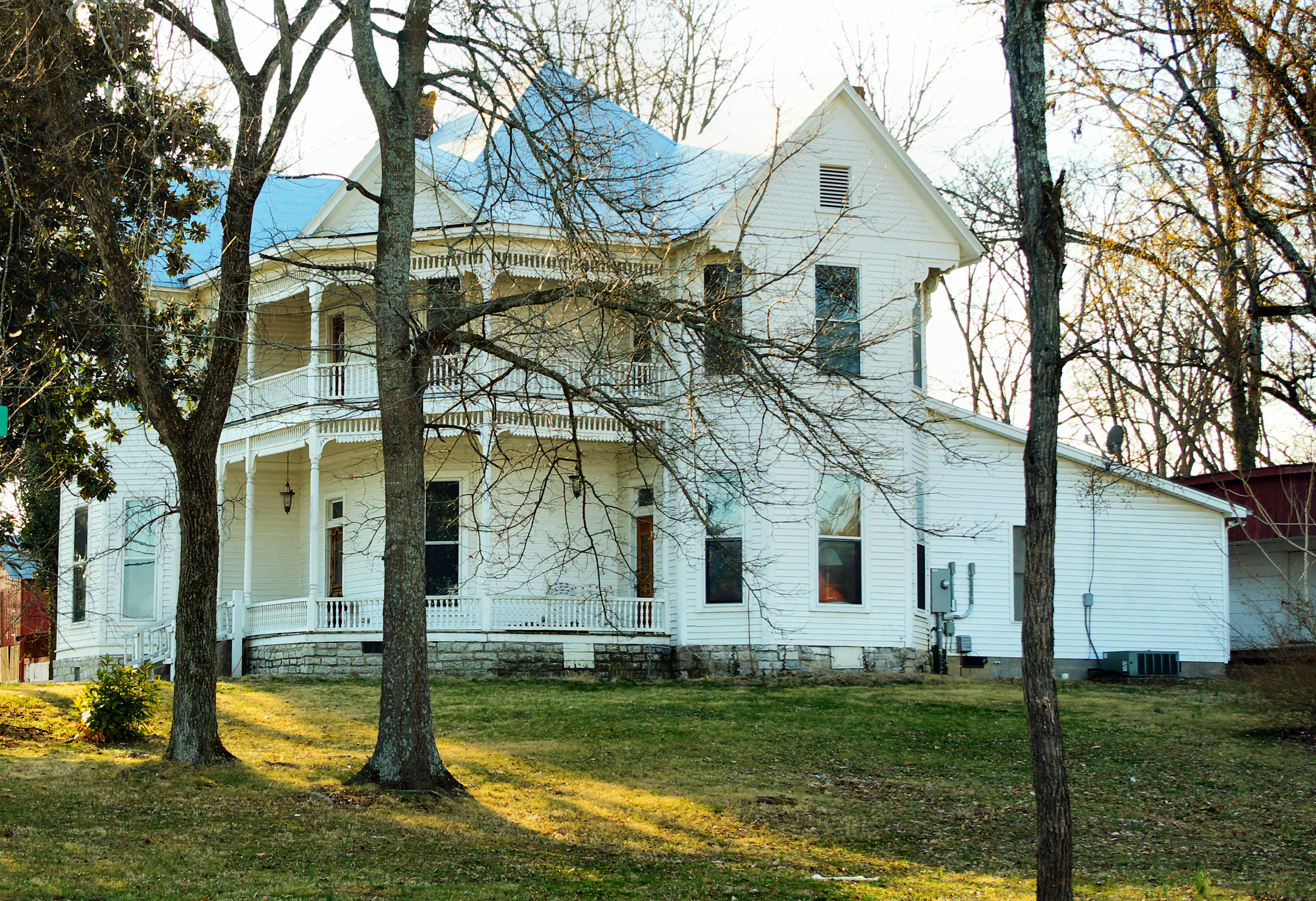
- The Brevard-Macon House in 2014

- Location within Tennessee Location within the United States
- Interactive map showing the location of Brevard-Macon House
- Location: 902 West Main Street, Woodbury, Tennessee
- Coordinates: 35°49′37″N 86°04′56″W
- Area: 1.6 acres (0.65 ha)
- Built: 1896
- Architectural style: Queen Anne
- NRHP reference No.: 94001491
- Added to NRHP: December 23, 1994

The Brevard-Macon House, also known as the Wharton House, is a historic house in Woodbury, Tennessee, United States. It was built in 1896 for William Ferrell Brevard, the owner of flour mills. It was purchased by E. L. Macon, the brother of country music artist Uncle Dave Macon, in 1926.

The house was designed in the Queen Anne architectural style. It has been listed on the National Register of Historic Places since December 23, 1994.
