= Shacktown Road =

Studio album by Norman Blake, Nancy Blake, Tut Taylor
- Released: January 23, 2007
- Genre: Americana, folk
- Label: Dualtone

Norman Blake chronology
Back Home in Sulphur Springs (2006)	Shacktown Road (2007)	Rising Fawn Gathering (2009)

Shacktown Road is an album by Americana and folk musicians Norman Blake, Nancy Blake and Tut Taylor, released in 2007. It was the first time Blake and Taylor recorded together since they were members of John Hartford's Aero-Plain band in the 1970s.

== Track listing ==
1. "Shacktown Road" (Tut Taylor) – 4:34
2. "Kindred Spirit" (Taylor) – 2:34
3. "Guitar Rag" (Traditional) – 3:21
4. "Not a Word from Home" (Roy Acuff) – 2:58
5. "The Old Dobro Man" (Taylor) – 3:59
6. "Worried Blues" (Traditional) – 4:21
7. "Tom Scala's Waltz" (Norman Blake) – 3:02
8. "Lizzie Hubbard Blues" (Taylor) – 6:31
9. "Going to Georgia" (Traditional) – 2:44
10. "Ode to Bascom" (Taylor) – 2:30
11. "On the Banks of Lake Pontchatrain" (Bryan) – 2:55
12. "It Must Be Jelly" (Taylor) – 2:13
13. "The Tag Railroad Rag" (Blake) – 3:33
14. "Running Wild" (Taylor) – 1:37
15. "Times Ain't Like They Used to Be" (Traditional) – 3:44
16. "End of the World" (Fred Rose) – 3:10
17. "Steel Guitar Blues" (Traditional) – 1:46
18. "The Buffalo Left Yesterday" (Taylor) – 2:19

== Personnel ==
- Norman Blake – guitar, mandolin, dobro
- Nancy Blake – guitar, mandolin, cello, mandola
- Tut Taylor – dobro, vocals, recitation
- Joel Landsberg – bass
