= Norman Blake and Red Rector =

1976 studio album

Studio album by Norman Blake, Red Rector
- Released: 1976
- Genre: Americana, bluegrass, folk
- Label: County Records

Norman Blake, Red Rector chronology
Live at McCabe's (1976)	Norman Blake and Red Rector (1976)	Whiskey Before Breakfast (1976)

Professional ratings
Review scores
Source	Rating
Allmusic	link

Norman Blake and Red Rector is an album by American guitarist Norman Blake and mandolin player Red Rector, released in 1976.

== Track listing ==
1. "Girl I Left Behind"
2. "Denver Belle"
3. "Lorena"
4. "The Old Spinning Wheel"
5. "Mississippi Sawyer"
6. "Red Wing"
7. "Cricket on the Hearth"
8. "Limehouse Blues"
9. "The Green Leaves of Spring"
10. "Freight Train"
11. " Darling Nellie Across the Sea"
12. "Darlin' Honey"
