= The Hobo's Last Ride =

Studio album by Norman Blake, Nancy Blake
- Released: August 20, 1996
- Genre: Americana, bluegrass, folk
- Length: 65:46
- Label: Shanachie
- Producer: Norman Blake, Nancy Blake

Norman Blake chronology
While Passing Along This Way (1994)	The Hobo's Last Ride (1996)	Chattanooga Sugar Babe (1998)

Professional ratings
Review scores
Source	Rating
AllMusic	4.5/5 stars

The Hobo's Last Ride is an album by American musicians Norman Blake and Nancy Blake, released in 1996.

== Track listing ==
1. "The Democratic Donkey (Is in His Stall Again)" – 3:30
2. "Tell Mother I'll Meet Her" – 3:32
3. "Forked Deer" – 3:21
4. "The Hobo's Last Ride" – 4:23
5. "Thebes" – 6:27
6. "Leaving Home" – 4:14
7. "Home of the Soul" – 3:04
8. "Midnight, the Unconquered Outlaw" – 4:32
9. "The Old Grey Mare Came Tearin' Out of the Wilderness" – 3:09
10. "I Know My Name Is There" – 3:56
11. "Starving to Death on the Government Claim" – 4:47
12. "Old Shady Bothreen" – 3:15
13. "Tying a Knot in the Devil's Tail" – 4:17
14. "Angel Gabriel" – 4:42
15. "The Two Little Orphans" – 4:11
16. "Memories That Never Die" – 4:26

== Personnel ==
- Norman Blake – guitar, mandolin, banjo, fiddle, viola, vocals
- Nancy Blake – guitar, mandolin, cello, vocals
