= Bluegrass Memories =

Studio album by Bill Monroe and his Blue Grass Boys
- Released: October 3, 1977
- Recorded: July 25–28, 1977
- Studio: Bradley's Barn (Mount Juliet, Tennessee)
- Genre: Bluegrass; gospel
- Length: 26:19
- Label: MCA
- Producer: Walter Haynes

Bill Monroe chronology
Bill Monroe Sings Bluegrass, Body and Soul (1977)	Bluegrass Memories (1977)	Together Again (1978)

Bluegrass Memories is the 13th studio album by American bluegrass musician Bill Monroe and his band, the Blue Grass Boys. Released by MCA Records on October 3, 1977, it features ten songs recorded over three sessions at Bradley's Barn in Mount Juliet, Tennessee on July 25, 27 and 28, 1977. The album was produced by Walter Haynes.

== Background ==
Bill Monroe's Blue Grass Boys went through a few late personnel changes just before the recording of Bluegrass Memories. First, after leaving the band in mid-March 1977, banjo player Bill Holden returned at the end of June, staying long enough for the sessions before leaving again in early-August. Next, fiddler Kenny Baker had to step back temporarily from the band, after suffering a "deep cut" to his left hand while showing his hunting knife to a few friends; he remained out of action until October that year while he recovered from "emergency microsurgery", with Norman "Buddy" Spicher stepping in to take his place at the upcoming sessions.

== Recording ==
At the first session on July 25, 1977, Monroe and his band started with a re-recording of Tex Logan's Christmas song "Christmas Time's A-Comin'", which they had originally recorded for a single release in 1951. This was followed by the instrumental "Texas Blue Bonnet" (reportedly named in reference to Monroe's love interest Julie LaBella, who was from Texas) and the vocal trio track "The Sunset Trail". Two days later, another session produced "My Sweet Memory" and "She's Young (And I'm Growing Old)", both of which featured the vocal trio again, and a second instrumental, "Blue Goose". At a third and final session the day after, Monroe and his group tracked a second Christmas song, Virginia Stauffer's "That's Christmas Time to Me"; an instrumental banjo song written by Holden, "Pinewood Valley"; another vocal trio track, "My Florida Sunshine"; and A. P. Carter's "Wabash Cannon Ball". The vocal trio featured Wayne Lewis on lead, Monroe on tenor and Randy Davis on baritone.

== Reception ==
Bluegrass Memories received positive reviews from critics. Cash Box magazine praised Monroe on the album for his decision to "remain close to the original 'Monroe sound' in spite of recent experimental changes by some bluegrass groups", while the Walrus progressive music newsletter called the album "a batch of fine songs", claiming that "The old master can churn out albums of fine quality without even trying". The album reached the top 50 of the Record World Country Album Chart.

== Track listing ==
Bluegrass Memories track listing
No.	Title	Writer(s)	Length
1.	"She's Young (And I'm Growing Old)" (recorded July 27, 1977)	Bill Monroe	2:25
2.	"Texas Blue Bonnet" (recorded July 25, 1977)	Monroe	2:04
3.	"My Sweet Memory" (recorded July 27, 1977)	Monroe	2:45
4.	"Blue Goose" (recorded July 27, 1977)	Monroe	2:35
5.	"Christmas Time's A-Coming" (recorded July 25, 1977)	Tex Logan	2:41
6.	"My Florida Sunshine" (recorded July 28, 1977)	Monroe	2:18
7.	"The Sunset Trail" (recorded July 25, 1977)	Monroe	3:32
8.	"Pinewood Valley" (recorded July 28, 1977)	Bill Holden	2:26
9.	"Wabash Cannon Ball" (recorded July 28, 1977)	A. P. Carter	2:57
10.	"That's Christmas Time to Me" (recorded July 28, 1977)	Virginia Stauffer	2:36
Total length:			26:19

== Personnel ==
- Bill Monroe — mandolin, vocals (lead on tracks 1, 5, 7, 9 and 10; tenor on tracks 1, 3 and 5–7)
- Wayne Lewis — guitar, lead vocals (tracks 1, 3, 6 and 7)
- James Monroe — guitar, lead vocals (track 5)
- Bill Holden — banjo
- Norman "Buddy" Spicher — fiddle
- Randy Davis — string bass, baritone vocals (tracks 1, 3 and 5–7)
- Walter Haynes — bells

== Bibliography ==
- Ewing, Tom (September 7, 2018), Bill Monroe: The Life and Music of the Blue Grass Man (Music in American Life), Champaign, Illinois: University of Illinois Press, ISBN 978-0252041891
- Rosenberg, Neil V.; Wolfe, Charles K. (June 7, 2007), The Music of Bill Monroe: Music in American Life, Champaign, Illinois: University of Illinois Press, ISBN 978-0252031212
