= Old Homestead Records =

- Founded: 1971
- Founder: John W. Morris
- Defunct: 2014
- Genre: Country, bluegrass
- Country of origin: U.S.
- Location: Howell, Michigan

Old Homestead Records was a record label based in Michigan specializing in preserving and reissuing recordings of traditional country and bluegrass artists.

== History ==
John W. Morris launched Old Homestead Record company in 1971 to release new and archival recordings by country singer and banjoist Wade Mainer.

Sublabels included Broadway Intermission, Collectors Series, and Rutabaga Records.

On Broadway Intermission, Morris released Bing Crosby's 1945 "Seventh Air Force Tribute" to vinyl from transcripts of a World War II Armed Forces Radio broadcast. Broadway Intermission also released music by Tommy Dorsey, Bix Beiderbecke, The Mills Brothers, and others.

== Artists (selective) ==
- Lee Allen and the Dew Mountain Boys
- The Flint River Boys
- The Anglin Brothers
- Emry Arthur
- Bobby Atkins, Frank Poindexter, and Tony Rice
- The Bailes Brothers (Johnnie & Homer)
- Charlie Bailey and The Happy Valley Boys with The Osborne Brothers
- Billy Baker
- The Barrier Brothers
- Lulu Belle and Scotty
- Blue Denim
- Blue Grass Roy
- Chris Bouchillon
- The Carolina Tar Heels
- The Carter Family
- Helen Carter
- Lew Childre
- The Coon Creek Girls
- Vernon Dalhart
- The Delmore Brothers
- The Dixie Gentlemen and Tut Taylor
- The Dixon Brothers
- The Girls of the Golden West
- Lonnie Glosson
- Bill Grant and Delia Bell
- G. B. Grayson and Henry Whitter
- Sid Harkreader
- Roy Harvey
- The Hilltoppers
- Clint Howard
- Joe Isaacs, Frank Wakefield, and Richard Greene
- Jewell Mountain Grass
- Bradley Kincaid
- The Jake Landers Family
- Mike Lilly and Wendy Miller
- McGee Brothers (Sam and Kirk)
- Uncle Dave Macon
- Wade Mainer
- Patsy Montana
- Charlie Moore and the Dixie Partners with Bill Napier
- The Marksmen
- Joe Meadows
- Charlie Monroe's Boys
- Clyde Moody
- Molly O'Day
- Original Lonesome Pine Fiddlers
- The Potomac Valley Boys
- Riley Puckett
- Eugene "Red" Rector
- Carson J. Robison
- Ramblin' Tommy Scott and Curly Seckler
- Red Smiley and the Bluegrass Cut-Ups
- Emma Smith
- The Southern Showboys
- Larry Sparks
- Spider Bridge
- The Stanley Brothers
- Ernest Stoneman
- Don Stover and the White Oak Mountain Boys
- Carl Story and the Rambling Mountaineers with The Brewster Brothers
- The Sunrise Bluegrass Boys
- The Sunnysiders
- The Tobacco Tags
- Frank Welling and John McGhee
- Whitey & Hogan with The Briarhoppers
- Rual Yarbrough and The Dixiemen

== See also ==
- List of record labels
