= Rising Fawn String Ensemble =

Studio album by Norman Blake
- Released: 1979
- Genre: Americana, bluegrass, folk
- Label: Rounder

Norman Blake chronology
Directions (1978)	Rising Fawn String Ensemble (1979)	Full Moon on the Farm (1981)

Professional ratings
Review scores
Source	Rating
Allmusic	3/5 stars

Rising Fawn String Ensemble is a recording (Rounder Records, 1979) by musicians Norman Blake (guitar), his wife Nancy Blake (cello), and James Bryan (fiddle).

== Track listing ==
1. "Devil Chased Me Around the Stump"
2. "Charlie Gaiter"
3. "Over the Waterfall"
4. "Opera Reel"
5. "Cherokee Shuffle"
6. "The Promise"
7. "Tin Foil and Stone"
8. "Three Ravens"
9. "Handsome Molly"
10. "Jeff Davis"
11. "Da Slockit Light"
12. "Briarpicker"
13. "Stony Fork "
14. "Old Ties"
15. "Coming Down from Rising Fawn No. 2"
