= Nashville Blues (album) =

Studio album by Norman Blake
- Released: 1984
- Genre: Americana, bluegrass, folk
- Label: Rounder
- Producer: Norman Blake

Norman Blake chronology
Original Underground Music from the Mysterious South (1982)	Nashville Blues (1984)	Lighthouse on the Shore (1985)

Professional ratings
Review scores
Source	Rating
AllMusic	2.5/5 stars

Nashville Blues is an album by American guitarist Norman Blake, released in 1984.

== Track listing ==
1. "Columbus Stockade Blues" (trad)
2. "My Name Is Morgan ( But It Ain't J.P.)" (trad)
3. "The Streamlined Cannonball" (Roy Acuff)
4. "Pretty Bird" (Norman Blake)
5. "In the Spring of the Year" (Norman Blake)
6. "We're Living in the Future" (Norman Blake)
7. "Nobody's Business" (trad)
8. "Sally Ann" (trad)
9. "I Was Born 4000 Years Ago" (trad)
10. "Nashville Blues" (Alton Delmore)
11. "The Banks Of Good Hope/The Green Fields of America" trad)

== Personnel ==
- Norman Blake – Guitar, Mandocello, Vocals
- Nancy Blake – Cello
- Charlie Collins – Guitar, Fiddle
- Peter Ostroushko – Mandolin, Fiddle
- Eugene O'Donnel – Fiddle
- Mick Moloney – Tenor Banjo
