= Full Moon on the Farm =

Studio album by Norman Blake
- Released: 1979
- Genre: Americana, bluegrass, folk
- Label: Rounder

Norman Blake chronology
| Rising Fawn String Ensemble (1979) | Full Moon on the Farm (1979) | Original Underground Music from the Mysterious South (1982) |

Professional ratings
Review scores
| Source | Rating |
|---|---|
| AllMusic | 2.5/5 stars |

Full Moon on the Farm is an album by American guitarist Norman Blake and the Rising Fawn String Ensemble, released in 1981.

== Track listing ==
1. "Kennedy Rag"
2. "Nancy's Hornpipe"
3. "Texola Waltz" (Nancy Blake)
4. "Gilderoy"
5. "Davenport March"
6. "OBC #3"
7. "Cairo Waltz" (Norman Blake)
8. "Jacky Tar"
9. "Sleepy-Eyed Joe"
10. "The Dog Star"
11. "Salty"
12. "Diamonds in the Rough"
