= Original Underground Music from the Mysterious South =

Studio album by Norman Blake
- Released: 1983
- Genre: Americana, bluegrass, folk
- Label: Rounder

Norman Blake chronology
Full Moon on the Farm (1981)	Original Underground Music from the Mysterious South (1983)	Nashville Blues (1984)

Professional ratings
Review scores
Source	Rating
AllMusic	3/5 stars

Original Underground Music from the Mysterious South is an album by American guitarist Norman Blake and the Rising Fawn String Ensemble, released in 1982.

== Track listing ==
1. "New Brick Road" – 3:25
2. "Dusty Rose" – 3:45
3. "Walnut River" – 2:12
4. "Pig on the Engine" – 2:45
5. "Third Street Gypsy Rag" – 2:58
6. "Georgia Home" – 2:52
7. "Peezlewhister" – 3:40
8. "Old Fiddler's Roll Call" – 2:04
9. "Pueblo" – 2:41
10. "The Toneality" – 3:28
11. "Natasha's Waltz" – 4:05
12. "Blake's March" – 2:25

== Personnel ==
- Norman Blake – guitar, banjo, mandolin, fiddle
- Peter Ostroushko – mandolin, fiddle, guitar
- Nancy Blake – cello, mandolin
- Carl Jones – guitar, mandola, mandolin, banjo
- Larry Sledge – mandocello
