= Sid Harkreader =

American musician (1898–1988)

- Born: Sidney Johnson Harkreader; February 26, 1898; Gladeville, Tennessee, U.S.
- Died: March 19, 1988 (aged 90)
- Genres: Old-time music, western music
- Occupation: Musician
- Instruments: Fiddle, vocals
- Years active: 1920s–1969
- Labels: Vocalion; Paramount; County; Old Homestead
- Formerly of: Uncle Dave Macon; Sid Harkreader & Company; The Round-Up Gang

Sidney Johnson "Fiddlin' Sid" Harkreader (February 26, 1898 — March 19, 1988) was an American old-time fiddle player and string band leader. He was an early member of the Grand Ole Opry, at first accompanying banjoist Uncle Dave Macon and later performing on the program with his own band. In the 1940s, Harkreader formed and briefly toured with the Western band "The Round-Up Gang" before returning again to the Opry.

== Biography ==
Harkreader was born in Gladeville, Tennessee, a small town in the cedar glades region east of Nashville. His father encouraged him to develop musical abilities, and Harkreader learned to play fiddle at local square dances. Determined to become a professional entertainer, Harkreader first toured as a fiddler for the Loew vaudeville circuit. Around 1923, he paired with Uncle Dave Macon to play old-time music in Nashville, and the following year, the two recorded several sides for Vocalion Records. On November 6, 1925, Harkreader and Macon delivered a performance before a sold-out crowd at the Ryman Auditorium, and the two began performing for the Grand Ole Opry (at the time called WSM's Barn Dance) a few weeks later. Harkreader's typical repertoire included "Old Joe" (which he learned from fellow Opry pioneer Humphrey Bate), "Turkey in the Straw," "Sugar Walks Down the Street," "Ain't Goin' to Rain No More," and "Go Away Mule."

Harkreader recorded two dozen tracks for Paramount Records, the first set coming in 1927 accompanied by Hawaiian slide-guitarist Grady Moore, and the second coming the following year accompanied by guitarist Blythe Poteet. In 1935, Harkreader returned to the Opry at the head of a string band, "Sid Harkreader and Company." The band consisted of Harkreader on fiddle and vocals, Emory Martin on mandolin, and Mack McGar on banjo. Around 1940, Harkeader formed "The Round-Up Gang" to record Western music, which had grown steadily in popularity in the previous decade. Harkreader eventually returned to the Opry, however, making guest appearances throughout the 1950s and 1960s.

Harkreader is buried at Caraway Cemetery in Gladeville.

== Discography ==
- I Wish I Was A Single Girl Again/New River Train (Vocalion Records 15035, April 1924)— 10" 78 RPM record on brown vinyl
- Nashville: The Early String Bands, Volume 1 (County Records CO-3521, 2000)— contains version of "Old Joe" recorded by Harkreader and Grady Moore in 1927
- Just from Tennessee with Uncle Dave Macon and Sam McGee, (Old Homestead), released in 2012
- Early Star of the Grand Ole Opry with Grady Moore (British Archive CDD424, 2013)
