= Nobody's Business (film) =

1926 film

Nobody's Business is a 1926 film directed by Norman Taurog with Lloyd Hamilton, Dick Sutherland, James T. Kelley.
