= Uncle Dave Macon =

American musician (1870–1952)

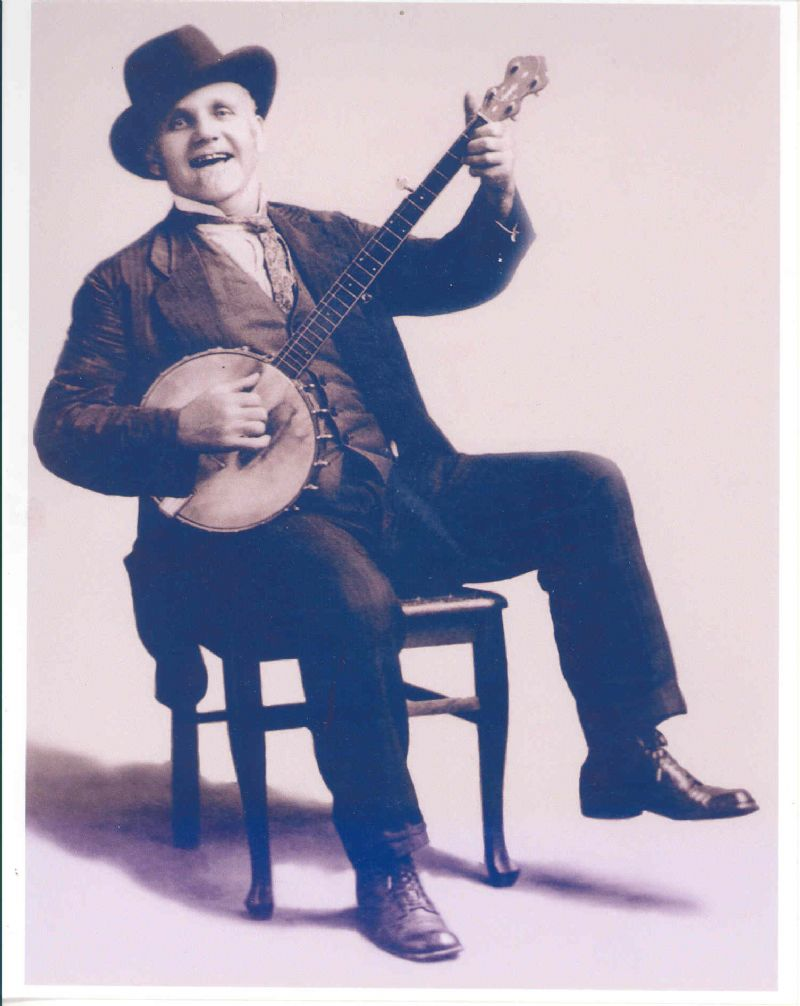

Background information
- Also known as: "Dixie Dewdrop"
- Born: David Harrison Macon; October 7, 1870; Smartt Station, Tennessee, US
- Origin: Nashville, Tennessee
- Died: March 22, 1952 (aged 81) Murfreesboro, Tennessee US
- Genre: Old-time music
- Occupations: Musician; singer; songwriter; comedian
- Instruments: Banjo, vocals
- Years active: 1880s–1952
- Formerly of: Fruit Jar Drinkers

David Harrison Macon (October 7, 1870 – March 22, 1952), known professionally as Uncle Dave Macon, was an American old-time banjo player, singer, songwriter, and comedian. Known as "The Dixie Dewdrop", Macon was known for his chin whiskers, plug hat, gold teeth, and gates-ajar collar; he gained regional fame as a vaudeville performer in the early 1920s before becoming the first star of the Grand Ole Opry in the latter half of the decade.

Macon's music is considered the ultimate bridge between 19th-century American folk and vaudeville music and the phonograph and radio-based music of the early 20th-century. Music historian Charles Wolfe wrote, "If people call yodelling Jimmie Rodgers 'the father of country music,' then Uncle Dave must certainly be 'the grandfather of country music'." Macon's polished stage presence and lively personality have made him one of the most enduring figures of early country music.

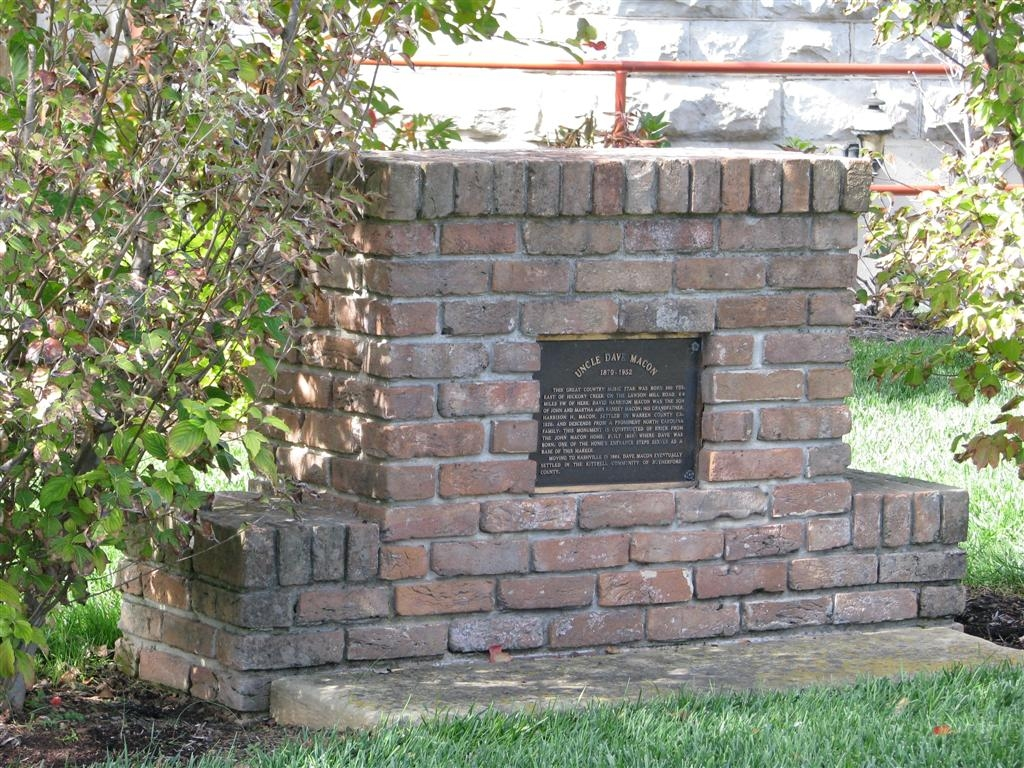
Monument composed of bricks from Macon's birthplace

== Early life and family ==
Macon was born in Smartt Station (about five miles south of McMinnville), Tennessee, the son of Confederate Captain John Macon and his wife Martha Ramsey. He was the great-great nephew of Nathaniel Macon.

In 1884, when David Macon was 13 years old, his family moved to Nashville, Tennessee, to run the Old Broadway Hotel, which they had purchased. The hotel became a center for Macon and his growing musical interests, and was frequented by artists and troupers traveling along vaudeville circuit and circus acts. In 1885, he learned to play the banjo from a circus comedian called Joel Davidson. He attended Hume-Fogg High School in Nashville. Macon's father was murdered outside the hotel in 1886. His widowed mother sold the hotel and the family moved to Readyville, Tennessee, where his mother ran a stagecoach inn. Macon began entertaining passengers at the rest stop, playing a banjo on a homemade stage.

In 1889, Macon married Matilda Richardson and moved to a farm near Kittrell, Tennessee, where they raised six sons. Around 1900, Macon opened a freight line between Murfreesboro and Woodbury, Tennessee. It was called The Macon Midway Mule and Mitchell Wagon Transportation Company. Often, when Macon was driving along with his mules, hauling freight and produce, he would entertain people by singing and playing the banjo at various stops along the way. In time, his sons became part of the company as they grew up. But the arrival of an automobile-based competitor threatened his mule company, and he was forced to close down in 1920.

His brother, E. L. Macon, was a businessman who purchased the Brevard-Macon House in 1926.

== Professional career ==
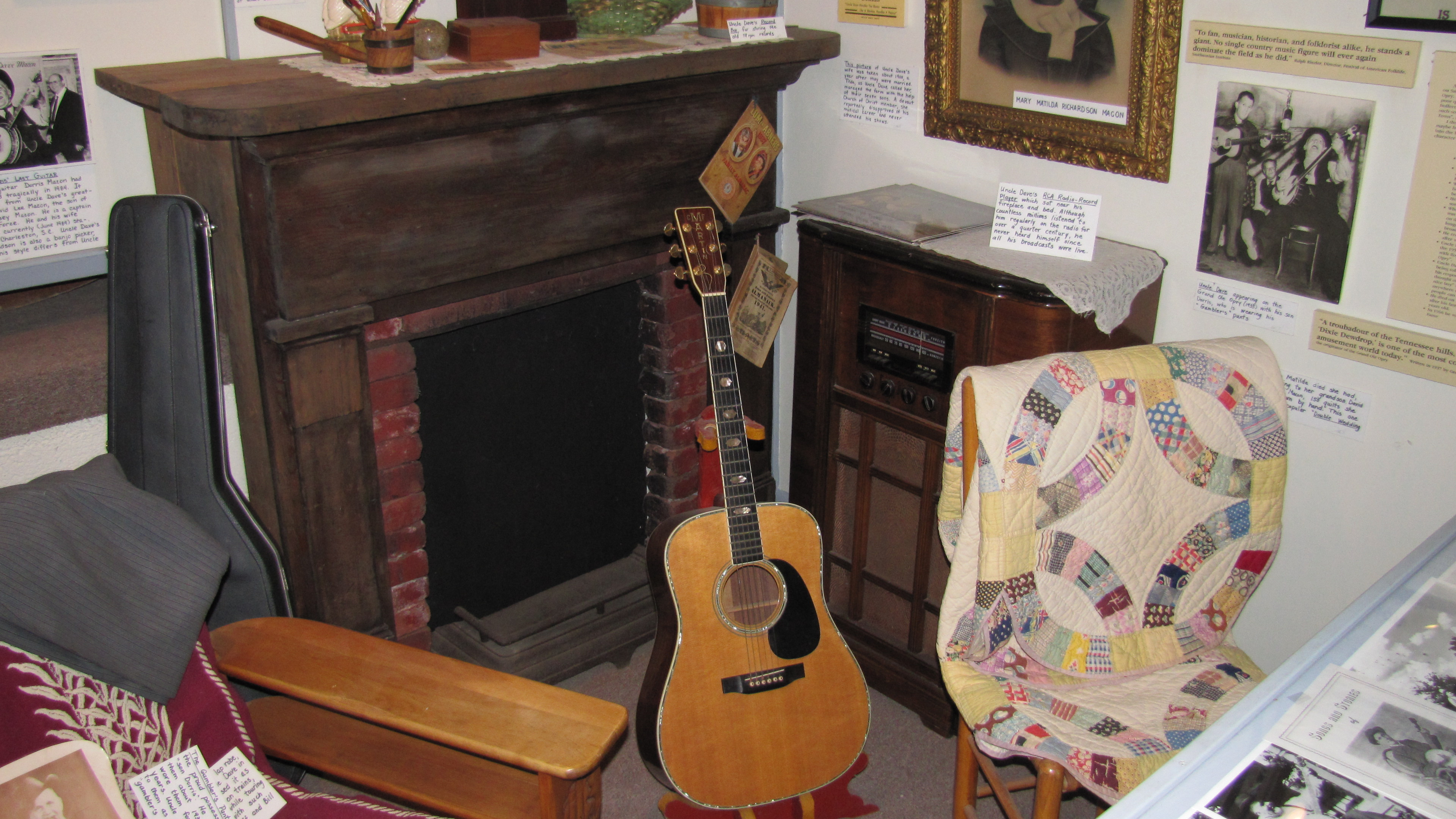
Uncle Dave Macon display at the Museum of Appalachia

Although Macon had long performed as an amateur and was well known for his showmanship, his first professional performance was in 1921 at a school in Morrison, Tennessee, during a Methodist church benefit. In 1923, during a performance for the Shriners in Nashville, Macon was seen by Marcus Loew of Loews Theatres, who offered him fifteen dollars if he would perform at a theater in Alabama. Macon accepted and went to Alabama. After the show he was approached by the manager of Loews Theatres in Birmingham, who wanted to hire him to perform there. Macon's salary was several hundred dollars a week. This led to offers from other theaters in the Loew's Vaudeville circuit. At the age of 50, Macon found himself a successful entertainer. A rival vaudeville circuit, the Keith-Albee-Orpheum Corporation, tried to hire him away from the Loew's circuit, but he refused.

In 1923 Macon began a tour of the south-eastern United States, joined by fiddler Sid Harkreader and five other acts. By now, the Sterchi Brothers Furniture Company, distributors of Vocalion Records, had noticed Macon and realised his potential as a recording artist. On July 8, 1924, Macon and Harkreader made their first recordings for Vocalion in New York City. The session extended over several days and eighteen songs were recorded. In 1925, Macon and Harkreader added "Dancing Bob" Bradford, a buck dancer to their act, Their tours on the Loew's circuit now included comedy, buck-dancing and old time music. In late 1925, Macon met guitarist Sam McGee, who was to become Macon's regular recording and performance partner. On November 6, 1925, Macon and Harkreader performed at the Ryman Auditorium—the future home of the Grand Ole Opry— in a benefit for the Nashville police force. The show was just three weeks before the Opry started as the WSM Barn Dance.

Macon was one of the first performers at the new WSM radio station. On December 26, 1925, Macon and fiddler Uncle Jimmy Thompson appeared together on the WSM Saturday night program. Macon's career with WSM lasted 26 years, but as he continued touring, he was not a regular performer in the years of the Grand Ole Opry. In early 1927, Macon formed the Fruit Jar Drinkers, composed of Macon, Sam McGee, Kirk McGee and Mazy Todd. The Fruit Jar Drinkers recorded for the first time on May 7, 1927. Although the group's repertoire was mainly traditional songs and fiddle numbers, they occasionally recorded religious songs, for which Macon would alter the group's name to the Dixie Sacred Singers.

In December 1930, Macon recorded for Okeh Records and later in 1934 for Gennett Records. On January 22, 1935, he began recording for Bluebird Records with the Delmore Brothers and a few years later in 1938 he recorded with Glenn "Smoky Mountain" Stagner. Between 1930 and 1952, Macon was often accompanied by his son Dorris who played the guitar. In 1940 Macon together with Opry founder George D. Hay, rising Opry star Roy Acuff, and Dorris Macon, received an invitation from Hollywood to take part in the Republic Pictures movie Grand Ole Opry. The film contains rare footage of Macon performing, including a memorable duet of "Take Me Back to My Carolina Home" with Dorris in which the 69-year-old Macon jumps out of his seat and dances throughout the second half of the song. Although Macon toured with Bill Monroe in the late 1940s, he was neither impressed by the new bluegrass style nor by the banjo picking of Monroe's bandmate Earl Scruggs. Macon also toured throughout the South with such Opry headliners as DeFord Bailey and Roy Acuff.

== Death and legacy ==
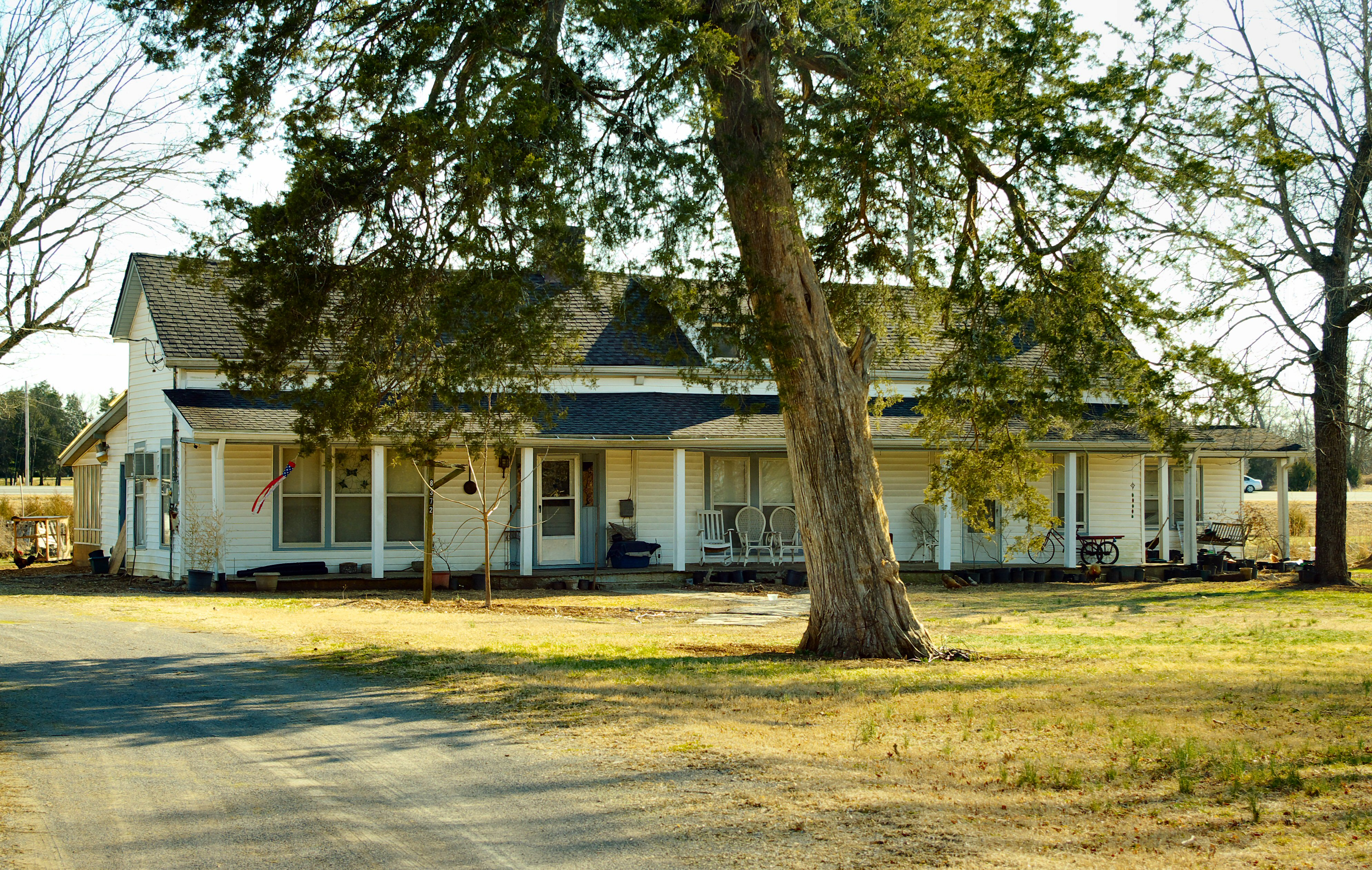
The Uncle Dave Macon House.

Macon continued to perform until shortly before his death on March 22, 1952, at Rutherford County Hospital in Murfreesboro. He was buried at Coleman Cemetery near Murfreesboro. His funeral was visited by more than 5,000 people and his pallbearers were George D. Hay, Kirk McGee, Roy Acuff, and Bill Monroe. He was inducted posthumously into the Country Music Hall of Fame in 1966. A monument was erected near Woodbury. His son Dorris and several bandmates (often including Sam and Kirk McGee) made sporadic appearances on the Grand Ole Opry as the Fruit Jar Drinkers until the early 1980s.

"Uncle Dave Macon Days" is an annual bluegrass music and dance festival. "Uncle Dave," as the festival is locally known started in 1978 on the grounds of the Rutherford County Courthouse in Murfreesboro, TN. After many years of growth, the festival moved to the Historic Cannonsburgh Village park, a short distance from the city's downtown square. "Uncle Dave" is now held at Hop Springs Beer Park on John Bragg Hwy. just outside of Murfreesboro, TN in September of each year. (In the beginning, "Uncle Dave" was held the first full weekend in July of each year.) The festival once hosted the national old-time clogging and buck dancing competitions, and since 1986 has hosted the national old time banjo competition.

Macon's house, the Uncle Dave Macon House, still stands on Old Woodbury Pike in Kittrell, Tennessee, and is listed on the National Register of Historic Places.

In 2014, the bridge over Cripple Creek in Kittrell was renamed the Uncle Dave Macon Bridge.

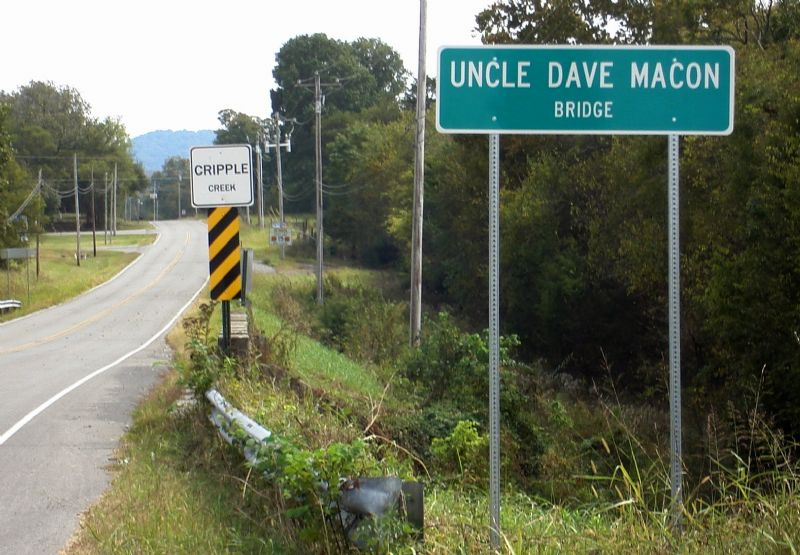
Uncle Dave Macon Bridge

== Repertoire and style ==
While Uncle Dave Macon recorded over 170 songs between 1924 and 1938, in his day he was most notable for his polished and lively stage presence. Bandmate Kirk McGee later described Macon's personality as a never-ending performance— "All day long, from morning till midnight, it was a show." While playing, Macon would often kick and stomp, and shout sporadically, taxing the skills of WSM's early volume-control engineers. His performance style can be discerned to some extent from his early recordings, in which he whoops and hollers amidst relatively aggressive vocal deliveries.

Macon was famous for his outrageous and funny performances, whether playing on the Vaudeville stage, at school and community socials, or at the Grand Ole Opry. Macon peppered his performances with jokes and comedic monologues, and often engaged in witty repartee with sidemen such as Sam McGee and Sid Harkreader. Other country entertainers marveled at Uncle Dave's skill as a performer. Grand Ole Opry star Roy Acuff said of Macon, "There was never a person that I have come in contact with in the entertainment world that was more individual than Uncle Dave Macon. He was a self-made entertainer who seemed to copy nobody."

Macon played an open-backed Gibson banjo on most of his recordings, and while contemporary musicians did not consider him a particularly skillful banjo player, modern musicologists have identified no less than 19 picking styles on Macon's recordings. Macon's favorite tunes included "A Soldier's Joy", "Bully of the Town", "The Arkansas Traveler", and "Sail Away, Ladies". Macon claimed to have learned the song "Rock About My Saro Jane" from black stevedores working along the Cumberland River in the 1880s. The song "Buddy Won't You Roll Down the Line" was inspired by the Coal Creek War, an East Tennessee labor uprising in the 1890s. In the song "From Earth to Heaven", Macon describes his days hauling goods between Woodbury and Murfreesboro for his shipping company. "Wreck of the Tennessee Gravy Train", recorded in 1930, served as political commentary on a financial scandal involving Tennessee Governor Henry Hollis Horton and the owner of the newspaper The Tennessean. Macon's favorite hymn was "How Beautiful Heaven Must Be", which is inscribed on his monument near Woodbury.

== Albums ==
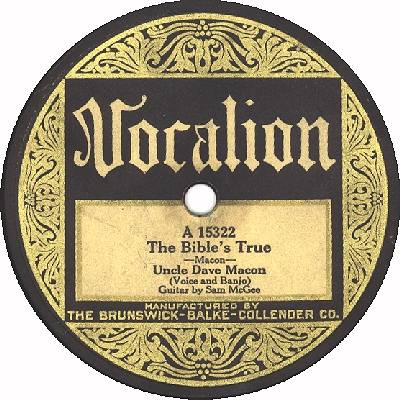
A record label of Uncle Dave Macon's The Bible's True, published by Vocalion Records

- Uncle Dave Macon (1963) (Folkways)
- First Featured Star of the "Grand Ole Opry" (Decca Records, 1966)
- Country Gospel Song (1971) (Folkways)
- Early Recordings (Uncle Dave Macon) – County Records (1971)
- Go Long Mule – County Records (1972)
- The Gayest Old Dude In Town – Folk Variety Records (1973)
- At Home – Bear Family Records (1976)
- Laugh Your Blues Away – Rounder Records (1979)
- Keep My Skillet Good and Greasy – Old Homestead Records (1979)
- Country Music Hall of Fame Series – MCA Records (1992)
- Travelin' Down the Road – County/BMG Records (1995)
- Anthology of American Folk Music – Folkways (1997)
