= Norman Blake (American musician) =

American musician (born 1938)

- Born: Norman L. Blake; March 10, 1938 (age 88); Chattanooga, Tennessee, U.S.
- Genres: Bluegrass, folk, country
- Occupations: Musician, singer-songwriter
- Instruments: Guitar, mandolin, six-string banjo, fiddle, dobro, banjo, viola, harmonica
- Years active: 1954–present
- Labels: Rounder, Flying Fish, Takoma, Shanachie, Red House, Plectrafone/Western Jubilee
- Spouse: Nancy Blake

Norman L. Blake (born March 10, 1938) is a traditional American stringed instrument artist and songwriter. He is half of the eponymous Norman & Nancy Blake band with his wife, Nancy Blake.

== Music career ==
=== Early performing ===
Blake was born in Chattanooga, Tennessee, and grew up in Sulphur Springs, Alabama. He listened to old-time and country music on the radio by the Carter Family, the Skillet Lickers, Roy Acuff, and the Monroe Brothers (Charlie and Bill Monroe). He learned guitar at age 11 or 12, then mandolin, dobro, and fiddle in his teens. When he was 16, he dropped out of school to play music professionally.

In the 1950s, Blake joined the Dixieland Drifters and performed on radio broadcasts, then joined the Lonesome Travelers. When he was drafted in 1961, he served as an Army radio operator in the Panama Canal Zone. He started a popular band known as the Kobbe Mountaineers. A year later, while he was on leave, he recorded the album Twelve Shades of Bluegrass with the Lonesome Travelers.

=== Nashville and Johnny Cash ===
After being discharged from the Army, Blake moved to Nashville and became a studio musician. For 10 years, he toured and recorded with country singer Johnny Cash and continued to play with Cash intermittently over the next 30 years. He met Nancy Short, a cellist with a classical music background who was playing in a folk group. He was asked by Bob Dylan to play on the country-folk album Nashville Skyline, then became a member of the house band on Johnny Cash's TV show. Kris Kristofferson, one of the guests, hired Blake to tour with him. Blake recorded with folk singer Joan Baez and appeared on her hit song "The Night They Drove Old Dixie Down". In 1971, he became a member of the bluegrass group Aero-plain, led by multi-instrumentalist John Hartford with fiddler Vassar Clements, a short-lived project.

Blake also played dobro on the 1972 album Will the Circle Be Unbroken by the Nitty Gritty Dirt Band.

In 1972, Blake recorded his first solo album, Home in Sulphur Springs (Rounder, 1972). Soon after his debut, he and Nancy recorded their first album, The Fields of November (Flying Fish, 1974), with Nancy on hillbilly cello. They married in 1975 and performed together for twenty years.

=== Style ===
Most of the music that Norman Blake plays could be described as neo-traditionalist Americana folk and roots music (folk, bluegrass, country, blues), and many of the songs he plays are traditional, but he plays this acoustic type of music with a style, speed, and quality that has evolved and progressed in the modern age. Though probably best known for his fluid renditions of classic fiddle tunes transcribed for the guitar ("Fiddler's Dream/Whiskey Before Breakfast"), Blake has also written songs that have become bluegrass and folk standards, such as "Ginseng Sullivan", "Slow Train through Georgia", "Billy Gray", and "Church Street Blues".

Blake has also written and published songs of a political nature, such as "Don’t Be Afraid of the Neo-Cons."

Blake is known for his tastefully simple-sounding style, saying, "I’m more interested in the music and the tone than I am the licks."

Although known as one of the most prominent steel-string guitar flatpickers, Blake is a multi-instrumentalist and vocalist. Other instruments he plays include the mandolin, 6-string banjo, fiddle, dobro, banjo and viola. He is known for his loose, right-hand guitar technique, which arose out of his mandolin technique. Also well known is his devotion to 12-fret guitars, including Martin 00s, 000s, D18s, D28s, and Gibsons, like his 1929 12-fret Nick Lucas special.

=== Collaborations ===
Blake has collaborated with Tony Rice on the albums, "Blake and Rice," and "Blake and Rice 2," which include many tunes, including some of Blake's originals. Blake also released an album with Mike Compton called, "Gallop to Georgia," which showcases many Old-Time tunes.

=== Awards and honors ===
Blake played on the album Raising Sand by Robert Plant and Alison Krauss, which won five Grammy Awards, and on the soundtrack O Brother, Where Art Thou?, which won a Grammy for Album of the Year.

Norman & Nancy Blake received Grammy nominations in the Best Traditional Folk Recording category for Blind Dog, Just Gimme Somethin' I'm Used To, While Passing Along This Way, and The Hobo's Last Ride. In 1986 Norman Blake was chosen Best Multi-Instrumentalist by the readers of Frets magazine.

== Discography ==
- Home in Sulphur Springs (Rounder, 1972)
- The Fields of November (Flying Fish, 1974)
- Old and New (Flying Fish, 1975)
- Norman Blake and Red Rector (County, 1976)
- Whiskey Before Breakfast (Rounder, 1976)
- Live at McCabe's (Takoma, 1976)
- Norman Blake/Tut Taylor/Sam Bush/Butch Robins/Vassar Clements/David Holland/Jethro Burns (Flying Fish, 1976)
- Blackberry Blossom (Flying Fish, 1977)
- Directions (Takoma, 1978)
- Rising Fawn String Ensemble (Rounder, 1979)
- Full Moon on the Farm (Rounder, 1981)
- Original Underground Music from the Mysterious South (Rounder, 1983)
- Nashville Blues (Rounder, 1984)
- Lighthouse on the Shore (Rounder, 1985)
- Natasha's Waltz (Rounder, 1987)
- Slow Train Through Georgia (Rounder, 1987)
- Blake & Rice (Rounder, 1987)
- Blind Dog (Rounder, 1988)
- Norman Blake and Tony Rice 2 (Rounder, 1990)
- Just Gimme Somethin' I'm Used To (Shanachie, 1992)
- While Passing Along This Way (Shanachie, 1994)
- The Hobo's Last Ride (Shanachie, 1996)
- Flat Pickin In the Kitchen (Tut Lee Records, 1997)
- Chattanooga Sugar Babe (Shanachie, 1998)
- Be Ready Boys: Appalachia to Abilene (Plectrafone/Western Jubilee, 1999)
- Far Away, Down on a Georgia Farm (Shanachie, 1999)
- Flower from the Fields of Alabama (Shanachie, 2001)
- Meeting on Southern Soil (Red House, 2002)
- Old Ties (Rounder, 2002)
- The Morning Glory Ramblers (Plectrafone/Western Jubilee, 2004)
- Back Home in Sulphur Springs (Dualtone, 2006)
- Shacktown Road (Plectrafone/Western Jubilee, 2007)
- Look A-Yonder Comin' (State Archives of Florida, 2008)
- Rising Fawn Gathering (Plectrafone/Western Jubilee, 2009)
- Sleepy Eyed Joe (Rounder, 2009)
- Green Light on the Southern (Plectrafone/Western Jubilee, 2010)
- Wood, Wire & Words (Plectrafone/Western Jubilee, 2015)
- Brushwood Songs & Stories (Plectrafone/Western Jubilee, 2017)
- Day By Day (Plectrafone/Western Jubilee, 2021)
- Pilgrimage to Rising Fawn (Avondale Records, 2024)

=== Soundtracks ===
- O Brother, Where Art Thou? (Mercury, 2000)
- Cold Mountain (DMZ/Columbia, 2003)
- Walk the Line (Wind-up, 2005)
- Inside Llewyn Davis (Nonesuch, 2013)

=== Videos ===
- Norman Blake's Guitar Techniques No. 1 (Homespun, 1990 VHS, 2003 DVD)
- Mandolin of Norman Blake (Homespun, 1992 VHS, 2005 DVD)
- My Dear Old Southern Home (Shanachie, 1994 VHS, 2003 DVD)
- Legends of Flatpicking Guitar (Vestapol, 1995 VHS, 2001 DVD)
- The Video Collection 1980–1995 (Vestapol, 1996 VHS, 2004 DVD)
- Great Guitar Lessons – Bluegrass Flatpicking (Homespun, 2000 VHS, 2006 DVD)
- Norman Blake's Guitar Techniques No. 2 (Homespun, 2001, 2003 DVD)
- Norman Blake: The Full Story! - I'm a Blind Dog in Meat Market (Songbirds Foundation interview, 2022)
