= Tut Taylor =

American musician (1923–2015)

- Born: Robert Arthur Taylor Sr. November 20, 1923; Milledgeville, Georgia, United States
- Died: April 9, 2015 (aged 91) North Wilkesboro, North Carolina, United States
- Genres: bluegrass, Americana, folk
- Occupation: Musician
- Instruments: Dobro, mandolin, banjo

Robert Arthur "Tut" Taylor Sr. (November 20, 1923 – April 9, 2015) was an American bluegrass musician.

Taylor played banjo and mandolin as a child, and began playing dobro at age 14, learning to use the instrument with a distinctive flat-picking style. Taylor was a member of The Folkswingers in the 1960s, who released three albums; he recorded his debut solo effort in 1964. Later in the 1960s, he played with the Dixie Gentlemen and in John Hartford's Aereo-Plain band.

Taylor became a local Nashville, Tennessee fixture. In 1970, he co-founded the instrument shop GTR there, soon after releasing another solo album. He also co-founded the Old Time Pickin' Parlor, a Nashville venue noted for performances of old-time music, as well as Tut Taylor's General Store.

In a March, 1992 interview, Neil Young reported having bought Hank Williams' Martin D-28 Guitar from Tut Taylor.

At the Grammy Awards of 1995, he was awarded the Grammy Award for Best Bluegrass Album for his work on The Great Dobro Sessions with Jerry Douglas.

Taylor recorded hundreds of reels of tape documenting and preserving bluegrass music, from "kitchen recordings" to live concerts, as well as serving as a recording engineer for studio albums. He donated about 500 reels to the Steam Powered Preservation Society, which has digitized many of them and made them available for streaming or downloading.

Taylor died on April 9, 2015.

== Discography ==
- 12-String Dobro World Pacific 1816, 1963
- Dobro Country (with Clarence & Roland White), World Pacific, 1964
- Blues & Bluegrass With Dixie Gentlemen, Tune 1001, 1966
- Aereo-Plain, Warner Bros, 1971, Reissued by Rounder, 1997
- Friar Tut, Rounder 0011, 1972
- No Name Album, Flying Fish HDS704, 1974
- The HDS Sessions, HDS 701, 1975
- The Old Post Office, Flying Fish 008, 1975
- Norman Blake/Tut Taylor/Sam Bush/Butch Robins/Vassar Clements/David Holland/Jethro Burns (1976)
- Dobrolic Plectral Society, Takoma C1050, 1976
- The Great Dobro Sessions, Sugar Hill, 1994
- Flat Pickin' The Kitchen, Tutlee TL1001, 1997
- Flash Flood, Tutlee TL1002, 1998
- Steam Powered Aereo-Takes, Rounder, ROUN0480, 2002
- Tut and Clarence Flatpicking, Tutlee TL1003, 2003
- Shacktown Road (2007) (with Norman Blake and Nancy Blake)
- Oozing the Blues - Barker and Taylor, 2008 (with Steve Barker and Lorrie Barker)
