= 16 All-Time Greatest Hits =

Compilation album by Bill Monroe and his Blue Grass Boys
- Released: August 1970
- Recorded: 1945–1949
- Genre: Bluegrass; gospel
- Length: 46:54
- Label: Columbia
- Producer: Art Satherley

Bill Monroe chronology
Kentucky Blue Grass (1970)	16 All-Time Greatest Hits (1970)	Bill Monroe's Country Music Hall of Fame (1971)

16 All-Time Greatest Hits is the 11th compilation album by American bluegrass musician Bill Monroe and his band, the Blue Grass Boys. Released by Columbia Records in August 1970, it features 16 songs recorded for the label between 1945 and 1949, all of which were previously released as singles or B-sides. 16 All-Time Greatest Hits is the fourth album released by Columbia covering Monroe's late-1940s output for the label, and is made up entirely of tracks featured on two compilations released by its subsidiary Harmony Records already: The Great Bill Monroe and his Blue Grass Boys (1961) and The Original Blue Grass Sound (1965).

== Background ==
Columbia Records issued 16 All-Time Greatest Hits as its fourth compilation (including releases by its subsidiary Harmony) for Bill Monroe in August 1970. The album features 16 tracks recorded by Monroe and his band during their time on Columbia between 1945 and 1949, eight each previously featured on the compilations The Great Bill Monroe and his Blue Grass Boys (1961) and The Original Blue Grass Sound (1965). The tracks include ten by the "classic bluegrass band" featuring guitarist and vocalist Lester Flatt, banjo player Earl Scruggs, fiddler Chubby Wise and bassist Howard "Cedric Rainwater" Watts; the other six include two by the 1944–1945 lineup of guitarists Tex Willis and Curly Bradshaw, banjo player David "Stringbean" Akeman, Wise, Watts and accordion player Sally Ann Forrester, and four by the 1949 lineup ofguitarist and vocalist Malcolm "Mac" Wiseman, banjo player Rudy Lyle, Wise and bassist Jack Thompson.

== Track listing ==
16 All-Time Greatest Hits track listing
No.	Title	Writer(s)	Original release	Length
1.	"Molly and Tenbrooks (The Racehorse Song)" (recorded October 28, 1947)	Traditional	"I'm Going Back to Old Kentucky" B-side (1949)	2:44
2.	"Blue Moon of Kentucky" (recorded September 16, 1946)	Bill Monroe	single A-side (1947)	3:03
3.	"Travellin' This Lonesome Road" (recorded October 22, 1949)	Monroe	"Can't You Hear Me Callin'" B-side (1950)	3:11
4.	"Blue Grass Stomp" (recorded October 22, 1949)	Monroe	"The Girl in the Blue Velvet Band" B-side (1949)	3:00
5.	"It's Mighty Dark to Travel" (recorded October 27, 1947)	Monroe	"When You Are Lonely" B-side (1948)	2:52
6.	"My Rose of Old Kentucky" (recorded October 27, 1947)	Monroe	single A-side (1948)	2:57
7.	"Wicked Path of Sin" (recorded September 17, 1946)	Monroe	"Summertime Is Past and Gone" B-side (1948)	2:39
8.	"Rocky Road Blues" (recorded February 13, 1945)	Monroe	single A-side (1946)	2:36
9.	"Blue Grass Breakdown" (recorded October 2, 1947)	Monroe	single A-side (1949)	2:40
10.	"When You Are Lonely" (recorded October 28, 1947)	Monroe; Lester Flatt	single A-side (1948)	2:43
11.	"The Girl in the Blue Velvet Band" (recorded October 22, 1949)	Cliff Carlisle; Mel Foree	single A-side (1949)	3:12
12.	"Little Cabin Home on the Hill" (recorded October 27, 1947)	Monroe; Flatt	"I Hear a Sweet Voice Calling" B-side (1948)	2:59
13.	"Footprints in the Snow" (recorded February 13, 1945)	Traditional, arr. Boyd Lane	"True Life Blues" B-side (1946)	2:39
14.	"Will You Be Loving Another Man" (recorded September 17, 1946)	Monroe; Flatt	"Blue Yodel No. 4" B-side (1947)	2:53
15.	"Can't You Hear Me Callin'" (recorded October 22, 1949)	Monroe	single A-side (1950)	3:48
16.	"I Hear a Sweet Voice Calling" (recorded October 27, 1947)	Monroe	single A-side (1948)	2:58
Total length:				46:54

== Personnel ==
- Bill Monroe — mandolin, vocals (lead on tracks 1, 2, 6, 8, 11, 13 and 16; tenor on tracks 3, 5, 7, 10, 12 and 14–16)
- Lester Flatt — guitar (tracks 1, 2, 5–7, 9, 10, 12, 14 and 16), lead vocals (tracks 5, 7, 10, 12, 14 and 16)
- Malcolm "Mac" Wiseman — guitar (tracks 3, 4, 11 and 15), lead vocals (tracks 3 and 11)
- Jimmy "Tex" Willis — guitar (tracks 8 and 13)
- Elliot "Curly" Bradshaw — guitar (tracks 8 and 13)
- Earl Scruggs — banjo (tracks 1, 2, 5–7, 9, 10, 12, 14 and 16), baritone vocals (track 7)
- Rudy Lyle — banjo (tracks 3, 4, 11 and 15)
- David "Stringbean" Akeman — banjo (tracks 8 and 13)
- Robert "Chubby" Wise — fiddle (all except track 7)
- Howard "Cedric Rainwater" Watts — string bass (tracks 1, 2, 5, 6, 8–10, 12–14 and 16), bass vocals (track 16)
- Jack Thompson — string bass (tracks 3, 4, 11 and 15)
- Wilene "Sally Ann" Forrester — accordion (tracks 8 and 13)
- Birch Monroe — bass vocals (track 7)
