= The Original Blue Grass Sound =

Compilation album by Bill Monroe and his Blue Grass Boys
- Released: June 1965
- Recorded: 1946–1949
- Genre: Bluegrass; gospel
- Length: 28:40
- Label: Harmony
- Producer: Art Satherley

Bill Monroe chronology
Bluegrass Instrumentals (1965)	The Original Blue Grass Sound (1965)	The High, Lonesome Sound of Bill Monroe and his Blue Grass Boys (1966)

The Original Blue Grass Sound is the seventh compilation album by American bluegrass musician Bill Monroe and his band, the Blue Grass Boys. Released by Harmony Records in June 1965, it features ten songs recorded for singles between 1946 and 1949. The Original Blue Grass Sound is the third Monroe compilation issued by Harmony to cover the late-1940s Columbia Records period, following The Great Bill Monroe and his Blue Grass Boys (1961) and Bill Monroe's Best (1964).

== Background ==
Harmony Records, a subsidiary of Columbia Records, issued The Original Blue Grass Sound as its third compilation for the musician in June 1965. The album features ten tracks recorded by Monroe and his band during their time on Columbia between 1945 and 1949 (the earliest recording is from 1946), including nine by the "classic bluegrass band" featuring guitarist and vocalist Lester Flatt, banjo player Earl Scruggs, fiddler Chubby Wise and bassist Howard "Cedric Rainwater" Watts. The other track features the 1949 lineup of guitarist and vocalist Malcolm "Mac" Wiseman, banjo player Rudy Lyle, Wise and bassist Jack Thompson.

== Track listing ==
The Original Blue Grass Sound track listing
No.	Title	Writer(s)	Original release	Length
1.	"Little Cabin Home on the Hill" (recorded October 27, 1947)	Bill Monroe; Lester Flatt	"I Hear a Sweet Voice Calling" B-side (1948)	2:59
2.	"I Hear a Sweet Voice Calling" (recorded October 27, 1947)	Monroe	single A-side (1948)	2:58
3.	"Will You Be Loving Another Man" (recorded September 17, 1946)	Monroe; Flatt	"Blue Yodel No. 4" B-side (1947)	2:53
4.	"When You Are Lonely" (recorded October 28, 1947)	Monroe; Flatt	single A-side (1948)	2:43
5.	"Wicked Path of Sin" (recorded September 17, 1946)	Monroe	"Summertime Is Past and Gone" B-side (1948)	2:39
6.	"I'm Going Back to Old Kentucky" (recorded October 27, 1947)	Monroe	single A-side (1949)	2:56
7.	"It's Mighty Dark to Travel" (recorded October 27, 1947)	Monroe	"When You Are Lonely" B-side (1948)	2:52
8.	"Travellin' This Lonesome Road" (recorded October 22, 1949)	Monroe	"Can't You Hear Me Callin'" B-side (1950)	3:11
9.	"Little Community Church" (recorded October 28, 1947)	Monroe	"That Home Above" B-side (1948)	2:45
10.	"Molly and Tenbrooks (The Racehorse Song)" (recorded October 28, 1947)	Traditional	"I'm Going Back to Old Kentucky" B-side (1949)	2:44
Total length:				28:40

== Personnel ==
- Bill Monroe — mandolin, vocals (lead on tracks 2 and 10; tenor on tracks 1 and 3–9)
- Lester Flatt — guitar (tracks 1–7 and 10), lead vocals (tracks 1–7 and 9)
- Earl Scruggs — banjo (tracks 1–4, 6, 7 and 10, baritone vocals (tracks 5 and 9)
- Robert "Chubby" Wise — fiddle (tracks 1–4, 6–8 and 10), guitar (track 9)
- Howard "Cedric Rainwater" Watts — string bass (tracks 1–4, 6, 7 and 10), bass vocals (tracks 2 and 9)
- Birch Monroe — bass vocals (track 5)
- Malcolm "Mac" Wiseman — guitar and lead vocals (track 8)
- Rudy Lyle — banjo (track 8)
- Jack Thompson — string bass (track 8)
