= The Original Bluegrass Band =

Compilation album by Bill Monroe and his Blue Grass Boys
- Released: 1978
- Recorded: 1946–1947
- Genre: Bluegrass; gospel
- Length: 34:41
- Label: Rounder
- Producer: Art Satherley

Bill Monroe chronology
Together Again (1978)	The Original Bluegrass Band (1978)	Bean Blossom '79 (1980)

The Original Bluegrass Band is a compilation album by American bluegrass musician Bill Monroe and his band, the Blue Grass Boys. Released by Rounder Records in summer 1978, it features 12 songs recorded in September 1946 and October 1947, all of which were released between 1947 and 1949. The album is Monroe's first compilation to be made up entirely of recordings by the "classic lineup" of his band, with guitarist Lester Flatt and banjo player Earl Scruggs co-credited on the album's sleeve.

== Background ==
The Original Bluegrass Band is the first compilation made up exclusively of recordings by the 1945–1948 incarnation of Bill Monroe and his Blue Grass Boys. The title is a reference to the moniker given retrospectively to the lineup of guitarist and vocalist Lester Flatt, banjo player Earl Scruggs, fiddler Chubby Wise and bassist Howard Watts, with whom Monroe is credited as having "created" the genre of bluegrass. All 12 tracks on the album had previously been released by Columbia Records subsidiary Harmony across three compilations: The Great Bill Monroe and his Blue Grass Boys (1961), Bill Monroe's Best (1964) and The Original Blue Grass Sound (1965).

== Track listing ==
The Original Bluegrass Band track listing
No.	Title	Writer(s)	Original release	Length
1.	"Heavy Traffic Ahead" (recorded September 16, 1946)	Bill Monroe	single A-side (1949)	2:51
2.	"I'm Going Back to Old Kentucky" (recorded October 27, 1947)	Monroe	single A-side (1949)	2:56
3.	"Little Cabin Home on the Hill" (recorded October 2, 1947)	Monroe; Lester Flatt	"I Hear a Sweet Voice Calling" B-side (1948)	2:59
4.	"Blue Grass Breakdown" (recorded October 2, 1947)	Monroe	single A-side (1949)	2:40
5.	"Sweetheart You Done Me Wrong" (recorded October 2, 1947)	Monroe; Flatt	"My Rose of Old Kentucky" B-side (1948)	3:35
6.	"Molly and Tenbrooks" (recorded October 28, 1947)	Traditional	"I'm Going Back to Old Kentucky" B-side (1949)	2:44
7.	"Toy Heart" (recorded September 16, 1946)	Monroe	"Blue Grass Breakdown" B-side (1949)	2:46
8.	"My Rose of Old Kentucky" (recorded October 27, 1947)	Monroe	single A-side (1948)	2:57
9.	"Wicked Path of Sin" (recorded September 17, 1946)	Monroe	"Summertime Is Past and Gone" B-side (1948)	2:54
10.	"Summertime Is Past and Gone" (recorded September 16, 1946)	Monroe	single A-side (1948)	2:55
11.	"When You Are Lonely" (recorded October 28, 1947)	Monroe; Flatt	single A-side (1948)	2:43
12.	"Will You Be Loving Another Man" (recorded September 17, 1946)	Monroe; Flatt	"Blue Yodel No. 4" B-side (1947)	2:41
Total length:				34:41

== Personnel ==
- Bill Monroe — mandolin, vocals (lead on tracks 1, 6 and 8; tenor on tracks 2, 3, 5, 7 and 9–12)
- Lester Flatt — guitar, lead vocals (tracks 2, 3, 5, 7 and 9–12)
- Earl Scruggs — banjo (all except track 9), baritone vocals (track 9)
- Robert "Chubby" Wise — fiddle (all except track 9)
- Howard "Cedric Rainwater" Watts — string bass (all except track 9), bass vocals (track 10)
- Birch Monroe — bass vocals (track 9)
