= The Great Bill Monroe and his Blue Grass Boys =

Compilation album by Bill Monroe and his Blue Grass Boys
- Released: March 20, 1961
- Recorded: 1945–1949
- Genre: Bluegrass; gospel
- Length: 29:55
- Label: Harmony
- Producer: Art Satherley

Bill Monroe chronology
I Saw the Light (1958)	The Great Bill Monroe and his Blue Grass Boys (1961)	Mr. Blue Grass (1961)

The Great Bill Monroe and his Blue Grass Boys is the first compilation album by American bluegrass musician Bill Monroe and his band, the Blue Grass Boys. Released by Harmony Records on March 20, 1961, it features ten songs recorded between 1945 and 1949, all of which were originally released as singles or B-sides. The album features recordings from three different lineups of the Blue Grass Boys, including the "classic bluegrass band" with Lester Flatt and Earl Scruggs.

== Background ==
Harmony Records, a subsidiary of Columbia Records, issued The Great Bill Monroe and his Blue Grass Boys as Monroe's first compilation on March 20, 1961. The album features ten tracks recorded by Monroe and his band during their time on Columbia between 1945 and 1949, including four by the "classic bluegrass band" featuring Lester Flatt, Earl Scruggs, Chubby Wise and Howard Watts. The other six tracks include three by the 1944–1945 lineup of Tex Willis, Curly Bradshaw, David "Stringbean" Akeman, Wise, Watts and Sally Ann Forrester, and three by the 1949 lineup of Mac Wiseman, Rudy Lyle, Wise and Jack Thompson.

== Reception ==
The Great Bill Monroe and his Blue Grass Boys received positive reviews from critics. Billboard Music Week featured it as a "Spotlight Winner of the Week", writing that "The title of this package is not an exaggeration. Monroe is regarded as one of the greatest — perhaps the greatest — in the blue grass category." Similarly, The Cash Box magazine claimed that the collection would "entice the masses of country fans still listening to Monroe", praising the selection of songs on the album.

In a piece published around a month after the album's release, The Cash Box noted that fans in Japan had responded overwhelmingly positively to the release of The Great Bill Monroe and his Blue Grass Boys, claiming that "The album is considered one of the best releases as far as country music is concerned, according to Japanese fans' opinions", but noting that Columbia's Japanese division showed "no sign" of distributing the album in the region.

== Track listing ==
The Great Bill Monroe and his Blue Grass Boys track listing
No.	Title	Writer(s)	Original release	Length
1.	"Rocky Road Blues" (recorded February 13, 1945)	Bill Monroe	single A-side (1946)	2:36
2.	"Kentucky Waltz" (recorded February 13, 1945)	Monroe	"Rocky Road Blues" B-side (1946)	2:44
3.	"Footprints in the Snow" (recorded February 13, 1945)	Traditional, arr. Boyd Lane	"True Life Blues" B-side (1946)	2:39
4.	"Blue Moon of Kentucky" (recorded September 16, 1946)	Monroe	single A-side (1947)	3:03
5.	"Mother's Only Sleeping" (recorded September 16, 1946)	Monroe	"Mansions for Me" B-side (1947)	3:16
6.	"Blue Grass Stomp" (recorded October 22, 1949)	Monroe	"The Girl in the Blue Velvet Band" B-side (1949)	3:00
7.	"My Rose of Old Kentucky" (recorded October 27, 1947)	Monroe	single A-side (1948)	2:57
8.	"Blue Grass Breakdown" (recorded October 2, 1947)	Monroe	single A-side (1949)	2:40
9.	"Can't You Hear Me Callin'" (recorded October 22, 1949)	Monroe	single A-side (1950)	3:48
10.	"The Girl in the Blue Velvet Band" (recorded October 22, 1949)	Cliff Carlisle; Mel Foree	single A-side (1949)	3:12
Total length:				29:55

== Personnel ==
- Bill Monroe — mandolin, vocals (lead on tracks 1–4, 7 and 10; tenor on tracks 5 and 9)
- Jimmy "Tex" Willis — guitar (tracks 1–3)
- Elliot "Curly" Bradshaw — guitar (tracks 1–3)
- Lester Flatt — guitar (tracks 4, 5, 7 and 8), lead vocals (track 5)
- Malcolm "Mac" Wiseman — guitar (tracks 6, 9 and 10), lead vocals (track 9)
- David "Stringbean" Akeman — banjo (tracks 1–3)
- Earl Scruggs — banjo (tracks 4, 5, 7 and 8)
- Rudy Lyle — banjo (tracks 6, 9 and 10)
- Robert "Chubby" Wise — fiddle
- Howard "Cedric Rainwater" Watts — string bass (tracks 1–5, 7 and 8)
- Jack Thompson — string bass (tracks 6, 9 and 10)
- Wilene "Sally Ann" Forrester — accordion (tracks 1–3)
