= Bill Monroe's Best =

Compilation album by Bill Monroe and his Blue Grass Boys
- Released: June 6, 1964
- Recorded: 1945–1947
- Genre: Bluegrass; gospel
- Length: 29:02
- Label: Harmony
- Producer: Art Satherley

Bill Monroe chronology
Bill Monroe Sings Country Songs (1964)	Bill Monroe's Best (1964)	I'll Meet You in Church Sunday Morning (1964)

Bill Monroe's Best is the fifth compilation album by American bluegrass musician Bill Monroe and his band, the Blue Grass Boys. Released by Harmony Records on June 6, 1964, it features ten songs recorded between 1945 and 1947, all of which were originally released as singles or B-sides. Bill Monroe's Best is the second Monroe compilation issued by Harmony to cover the late-1940s Columbia Records period, following the 1961 release The Great Bill Monroe and his Blue Grass Boys.

== Background ==
Harmony Records, a subsidiary of Columbia Records, issued Bill Monroe's Best as its second compilation for the musician on June 6, 1964. The album features ten tracks recorded by Monroe and his band during their time on Columbia between 1945 and 1949 (the latest recording is from 1947), including seven by the "classic bluegrass band" featuring Lester Flatt, Earl Scruggs, Chubby Wise and Howard Watts. The other three tracks feature the 1944–1945 lineup of guitarists Jimmy "Tex" Willis and Elliot "Curly" Bradshaw, banjo player David "Stringbean" Akeman, Wise, Watts and accordion player Wilene "Sally Ann" Forrester.

== Track listing ==
Bill Monroe's Best track listing
No.	Title	Writer(s)	Original release	Length
1.	"Blue Grass Special" (recorded February 13, 1945)	Bill Monroe	single A-side (1947)	2:26
2.	"Goodbye Old Pal" (recorded February 13, 1945)	Monroe	"Blue Moon of Kentucky" B-side (1947)	2:25
3.	"True Life Blues" (recorded February 13, 1945)	Monroe	single A-side (1946)	2:50
4.	"Blue Yodel #4" (recorded September 16, 1946)	Jimmie Rodgers	single A-side (1947)	3:06
5.	"Mansions for Me" (recorded September 16, 1946)	Monroe	single A-side (1947)	3:16
6.	"Summertime Is Past and Gone" (recorded September 16, 1946)	Monroe	single A-side (1948)	2:55
7.	"Toy Heart" (recorded September 16, 1946)	Monroe	"Blue Grass Breakdown" B-side (1949)	2:46
8.	"Heavy Traffic Ahead" (recorded September 16, 1946)	Monroe	single A-side (1949)	2:51
9.	"Sweetheart You Done Me Wrong" (recorded October 27, 1947)	Lester Flatt; Monroe	"My Rose of Old Kentucky" B-side (1948)	3:35
10.	"The Old Cross Road (Is Waiting)" (recorded October 27, 1947)	Monroe	single A-side (1949)	2:42
Total length:				29:02

== Personnel ==
- Bill Monroe — mandolin, vocals (lead on tracks 2, 4 and 8; tenor on tracks 3, 5–7, 9 and 10)
- Jimmy "Tex" Willis — guitar (tracks 1–3)
- Elliot "Curly" Bradshaw — guitar (tracks 1 and 2)
- Lester Flatt — guitar (tracks 4–10), lead vocals (tracks 5–7, 9 and 10)
- David "Stringbean" Akeman — banjo (tracks 1–3)
- Earl Scruggs — banjo (tracks 4–10)
- Robert "Chubby" Wise — fiddle
- Wilene "Sally Ann" Forrester — accordion (tracks 1–3)
- Howard "Cedric Rainwater" Watts — string bass, bass vocals (track 6)
