= Bill Monroe's Country Music Hall of Fame =

Compilation album by Bill Monroe and his Blue Grass Boys
- Released: April 26, 1971
- Recorded: 1952–1971
- Genre: Bluegrass; gospel
- Length: 28:25
- Label: Decca
- Producer: Paul Cohen; Owen Bradley; Harry Silverstein; Walter Haynes

Bill Monroe chronology
16 All-Time Greatest Hits (1970)	Bill Monroe's Country Music Hall of Fame (1971)	Uncle Pen (1972)

Bill Monroe's Country Music Hall of Fame is the 12th compilation album by American bluegrass musician Bill Monroe and his band, the Blue Grass Boys. Released by Decca Records on April 26, 1971, it contains 11 songs recorded between 1952 and 1971, five of which were previously released as singles or B-sides. The six previously unreleased tracks are new recordings of compositions Monroe and his band had recorded in earlier years for singles and B-sides.

== Background ==
In October 1970, after several years of campaigning by members of his fan club, Bill Monroe was inducted into the Country Music Hall of Fame. To mark the occasion, Monroe and new producer Walter Haynes arranged to re-record several of his most popular songs from throughout his career for his next album.

== Recording ==
The first recording session for Bill Monroe's Country Music Hall of Fame took place on December 2, 1970, featuring regular Blue Grass Boys members James Monroe on guitar, Kenny Baker on fiddle and Joe Stuart on bass, in addition to banjo player Bobby Thompson filling in for the outgoing Rual Yarbrough, and guest fiddlers Gordon Terry and Joe "Red" Hayes. The two tracks recorded were Monroe's original "Kentucky Waltz" (originally recorded for a 1946 single release with "Rocky Road Blues") and Cliff Carlisle's "The Girl in the Blue Velvet Band" (originally recorded for a 1949 single release with "Blue Grass Stomp"); "My Little Georgia Rose", from 1950, was also recorded, but was rejected for the album. Instrumental "Get Up John", originally from 1953, was re-recorded at a session the next day.

By the time of the third scheduled recording for the album, on January 13, 1971, Yarbrough had officially left the Blue Grass Boys and been replaced by Earl Snead. He debuted at said session, at which the band focused on material dating back as early as the 1940s — recorded first was "Summertime Is Past and Gone", which originated as a single in 1948; second was "Rocky Road Blues", originally from 1946; and third was a re-recording of Monroe's very first solo single, "Mule Skinner Blues", originally from 1940. A new version of "Katy Hill", also from 1940, was also recorded, but ultimately not included on the album — in his book Bill Monroe: The Life and Music of the Blue Grass Man, Tom Ewing suggested that this omission could be due to the fact that Snead "couldn't manage a melodic-style break" in the song.

Monroe's only two other recording sessions of 1971 took place later in January, both of which focused on material for the upcoming planned album featuring material introduced to Monroe by his "Uncle Pen", Pendleton Vandiver. The remainder of the album's track listing was made up of previously released songs, dating back as early as 1952.

== Reception ==
Bill Monroe's Country Music Hall of Fame received positive reviews from critics. Billboard magazine called it "A fine package for collectors", noting that Monroe "is represented [on the album] by some great performances". Cash Box, similarly, described the songs on the album as "all memorable, all easily recognizable". Record World hailed the album as "a bluegrass purist's dream".

== Track listing ==
Bill Monroe's Country Music Hall of Fame track listing
No.	Title	Writer(s)	Original release	Length
1.	"Mule Skinner Blues" (recorded January 13, 1971)	Jimmie Rodgers; George Vaughn Horton	previously unreleased	2:44
2.	"Kentucky Waltz" (recorded December 2, 1970)	Bill Monroe	previously unreleased	3:02
3.	"Get Up John" (recorded December 3, 1970)	Monroe	previously unreleased	2:32
4.	"You'll Find Her Name Written There" (recorded December 31, 1954)	Harold Hensley	single A-side (1957)	2:47
5.	"Blue Moon of Kentucky" (recorded September 4, 1954)	Monroe	single A-side (1954)	2:05
6.	"Put My Little Shoes Away" (recorded June 26, 1954)	Traditional	"Wheel Hoss" B-side (1955)	2:31
7.	"Rocky Road Blues" (recorded January 13, 1971)	Monroe	previously unreleased	2:00
8.	"The Girl in the Blue Velvet Band" (recorded December 2, 1970)	Cliff Carlisle; Mel Foree	previously unreleased	2:52
9.	"Summertime Is Past and Gone" (recorded January 13, 1971)	Monroe	previously unreleased	2:20
10.	"Footprints in the Snow" (recorded July 18, 1952)	Rupert Jones	single A-side (1952)	2:37
11.	"The Gold Rush" (recorded August 23, 1967)	Monroe	"Virginia Darlin'" B-side (1968)	2:55
Total length:				28:25

== Personnel ==
- Bill Monroe — mandolin, vocals (lead on tracks 1, 2 and 4–10; tenor on track 9)
- James Monroe — guitar (tracks 1, 2 and 7–9), string bass (track 11), lead vocals (track 9)
- Jimmy Martin — guitar (tracks 3 and 10)
- Claude "Jackie" Phelps — guitar (track 4)
- Edd Mayfield — guitar (tracks 5 and 6)
- Roland White — guitar (track 11)
- Earl Snead — banjo (tracks 1, 7 and 9)
- Bobby Thompson — banjo (tracks 2 and 8)
- Rudy Lyle — banjo (track 3)
- Hubert Davis — banjo (track 4)
- Jim Smoak — banjo (track 6)
- Sonny Osborne — banjo (track 10)
- Vic Jordan — banjo (track 11)
- Kenny Baker — fiddle (tracks 1, 2 and 7–9)
- Gordon Terry — fiddle (tracks 2, 5 and 6), guitar (track 8)
- Joe "Red" Hayes — fiddle (tracks 2 and 8)
- Charlie Cline — fiddle (tracks 3–7 and 10)
- Bobby Hicks — fiddle (track 4)
- Merle "Red" Taylor — fiddle (tracks 5 and 6)
- Byron Berline — fiddle (track 11)
- Joe Stuart — string bass (tracks 1, 2 and 7–9), baritone vocals (track 9)
- Ernie Newton — string bass (tracks 3–6 and 10)

== Bibliography ==
- Ewing, Tom (September 7, 2018), Bill Monroe: The Life and Music of the Blue Grass Man (Music in American Life), Champaign, Illinois: University of Illinois Press, ISBN 978-0252041891
