= Uncle Pen (album) =

Studio album by Bill Monroe and his Blue Grass Boys
- Released: June 1, 1972
- Recorded: March 1969–January 1971
- Studio: Columbia Recording Studio (Nashville, Tennessee); Bradley's Barn (Mount Juliet, Tennessee)
- Genre: Bluegrass; gospel
- Length: 21:43
- Label: Decca
- Producer: Harry Silverstein; Walter Haynes

Bill Monroe chronology
Bill Monroe's Country Music Hall of Fame (1971)	Uncle Pen (1972)	Father & Son (1973)

Singles from Uncle Pen
- 1. "Goin' Up Caney" Released: May 3, 1971

Uncle Pen is the ninth studio album by American bluegrass musician Bill Monroe and his band, the Blue Grass Boys. Released by Decca Records on June 1, 1972, it features eleven songs recorded at various sessions between March 1969 and January 1971, one of which ("Goin' Up Caney") was released as a single. The album is named in reference to Monroe's uncle Pendleton Vandiver, with whom he lived for several years during his childhood and credits as a key inspiration for his music. Uncle Pen is Monroe's first album of entirely original material, his first almost entirely-instrumental album, and his final release for Decca Records before it became a subsidiary of MCA.

== Background ==
Bill Monroe's two main musical influences growing up were his mother Malissa, who played fiddle and sang, and her brother Pendleton Vandiver, a well-known fiddler. Referred to by people inside and outside the family as "Uncle Pen", Vandiver performed at local dances and social events in his hometown of Rosine, Kentucky, as well as privately for his sister and her children. Monroe has praised Vandiver's playing on many occasions, claiming that he had "the most perfect time of any fiddler" and "a shuffle that was out of this world". Some of Monroe's earliest musical memories included Vandiver performing with another uncle, Burch, and Clarence Remus Wilson. When he started performing for the first time alongside older brothers Birch and Charlie, Monroe also accompanied Vandiver on several occasions.

After his mother Malissa and father John died in 1921 and 1928, respectively, Monroe moved in with Vandiver. The pair continued to perform together regularly throughout 1929, which gave Monroe a chance to learn a wide range of songs from his uncle. In the spring of 1930, 18-year-old Monroe moved out after two years with Vandiver. Two years later, "Uncle Pen" died of bronchitis and double pneumonia. Monroe did not learn about his death until after the funeral.

20 years after Vandiver's death, Monroe wrote the song "Uncle Pen" as a tribute to his uncle, with help from then-Blue Grass Boys fiddler Merle "Red" Taylor. The song was released on a single alongside "When the Golden Leaves Begin to Fall" that December on Decca Records. It was later covered by Porter Wagoner in 1954, then selected — alongside several other Monroe tracks — to be recorded by Rose Maddox for her 1962 album Rose Maddox Sings Bluegrass, on which Monroe performed mandolin. In a 1966 interview with his manager Ralph Rinzler, Monroe first discussed the idea of recording an album full of songs he'd learned from Vandiver, stating that "I want all of 'em put on record and as near the way that he played 'em as I can ... so they won't be just throwed away and forgot about".

== Recording ==
Kenny Baker was one of two Blue Grass Boys (alongside James Monroe) who performed on every track on Uncle Pen.

The first song recorded for Uncle Pen was "The Dead March", which Monroe and the Blue Grass Boys tracked on March 26, 1969, two days after banjo player Rual Yarbrough joined the band. As predominantly fiddle-based compositions, most of the tracks recorded for the album featured twin fiddlers, so regular fiddler Kenny Baker was joined by Joe "Red" Hayes. Bass was performed by session musician Joe Zinkan, as Blue Grass Boys bassist Doug Green was relatively inexperienced on the instrument. After several rehearsals, the second Uncle Pen track came from the group's next recording session, on April 29, 1969, where the band recorded "Methodist Preacher". Tommy Williams had taken over from Hayes as second fiddler at the session, but did not perform on "Methodist Preacher", with Baker playing solo.

Monroe and the Blue Grass Boys' next session took place on October 28, 1969 — his first at Bradley's Barn in Mount Juliet, Tennessee, after recording at the Columbia Recording Studio his whole career. Again, a single track for Uncle Pen was recorded amongst other songs: "Candy Gal" featured new bassist Bill Yates, as well as returning guest fiddler Red Hayes. The next session, on November 25, produced two songs for the album — "Goin' Up Caney" and "The Lee Weddin' Tune" — both of which were fiddled solo by Baker. The former was the only song with vocals recorded for Uncle Pen, with Yates singing lead. Yates left shortly after the session.

Days before Monroe's first session of 1970, producer Harry Silverstein died of a heart attack. The January 19 session was led by an unnamed stand-in and spawned "McKinley's March", which was issued as a single in March 1970, and "Texas Gallop", for the album. This was the only song recorded for Uncle Pen for the whole year, with the project "temporarily derailed" as a result of Silverstein's death. The remaining five tracks for the album were recorded at two sessions on January 15 and 20, 1971, by which time Yarbrough had left the band — he was officially replaced by Earl Snead, although Bobby Thompson filled in at said sessions. Produced by Walter Haynes, the sessions spawned "Poor White Folks", "The Old Gray Mare Came Tearing Out of the Wilderness", "Kiss Me Waltz", "Jenny Lynn" and "Heel and Toe Polka".

== Release ==
Despite being completed more than a year earlier, Uncle Pen did not see release until June 1, 1972. Speaking at the time of the album's release, Monroe commented:

"I don't think he wrote any of them [the songs recorded for the album]. I think they were just tunes that he played. But I've kept about thirty of them in my head since then [the 1920s] ... I been meaning to record them for a long time and I've finally got around to it. I'm sixty years old now, and you don't know what will ever happen."

Uncle Pen was Monroe's last album released by Decca Records — starting with his next release, Father & Son with James Monroe, the label became a subsidiary of MCA Records in the United States. No singles were issued to promote the album, although "Goin' Up Caney" was released on May 3, 1971, backed with instrumental "Tallahassee".

== Track listing ==
All tracks are written by Bill Monroe.

Uncle Pen track listing
No.	Title	Length
1.	"Jenny Lynn" (recorded January 20, 1971)	2:15
2.	"Methodist Preacher" (recorded April 29, 1969)	1:55
3.	"Goin' Up Caney" (recorded November 25, 1969)	2:17
4.	"The Dead March" (recorded March 26, 1969)	2:15
5.	"The Lee Weddin' Tune" (recorded November 25, 1969)	1:53
6.	"Poor White Folks" (recorded January 15, 1971)	2:15
7.	"Candy Gal" (recorded October 28, 1969)	2:15
8.	"Texas Gallop" (recorded January 19, 1970)	2:08
9.	"The Old Gray Mare Came Tearing Out of the Wilderness" (recorded January 15, 1971)	2:08
10.	"Heel and Toe Polka" (recorded January 20, 1971)	2:27
11.	"Kiss Me Waltz" (recorded January 15, 1971)	2:10
Total length:		21:43

== Personnel ==
Tracks 2 and 4 (recorded March/April 1969)

- Bill Monroe — mandolin
- James Monroe — guitar
- Rual Yarbrough — banjo
- Kenny Baker — fiddle
- Joe "Red" Hayes — fiddle (track 4)
- Joe Zinkan — string bass

Tracks 3, 5, 7 and 8 (recorded October 1969–January 1970)

- Bill Monroe — mandolin, tenor vocals (track 5)
- James Monroe — guitar
- Rual Yarbrough — banjo, baritone vocals (track 5)
- Kenny Baker — fiddle
- Joe "Red" Hayes — fiddle (track 7)
- Tommy Williams — fiddle (track 8)
- Bill Yates — string bass (tracks 3, 5 and 7), lead vocals (track 5)
- Joe Zinkan — string bass (track 8)

Tracks 1, 6 and 9–11 (recorded January 15/20, 1971)

- Bill Monroe — mandolin
- James Monroe — guitar
- Bobby Thompson — banjo
- Kenny Baker — fiddle
- Norman "Buddy" Spicher — fiddle (tracks 1 and 10)
- Joe Stuart — string bass

== Bibliography ==
- Ewing, Tom (September 7, 2018), Bill Monroe: The Life and Music of the Blue Grass Man (Music in American Life), Champaign, Illinois: University of Illinois Press, ISBN 978-0252041891
