= Bill Monroe Sings Country Songs =

Compilation album by Bill Monroe and his Blue Grass Boys
- Released: March 2, 1964
- Recorded: 1950–1959
- Genre: Bluegrass; gospel
- Length: 29:52
- Label: Vocalion
- Producer: Paul Cohen; Owen Bradley

Bill Monroe chronology
Early Blue Grass Music (1963)	Bill Monroe Sings Country Songs (1964)	Bill Monroe's Best (1964)

Bill Monroe Sings Country Songs is the fourth compilation album by American bluegrass musician Bill Monroe and his band, the Blue Grass Boys. Released by Vocalion Records on March 2, 1964, it features 12 songs recorded between 1950 and 1959 for Decca Records, including three tracks that were previously unreleased. Bill Monroe Sings Country Songs is the second Monroe compilation to cover the 1950s period, following Decca's 1962 release My All Time Country Favorites.

== Background ==
In the fall of 1963, Bill Monroe's manager Ralph Rinzler started researching the history of Monroe's recordings with Decca Records, looking for tracks that had not yet been released. Finding "Peach Pickin' Time in Georgia" from 1951, "Used to Be" from 1955 and "When the Phone Rang" from 1959, he arranged for the production of Bill Monroe Sings Country Songs to be released early the next year by Vocalion Records, a subsidiary of Decca which primarily released retrospective material. According to future Blue Grass Boys member and Monroe biographer Tom Ewing, Rinzler "undoubtedly" chose the rest of the songs that would make up the compilation, which he described as "several old favorites". Bill Monroe Sings Country Songs was released by Vocalion on March 2, 1964.

== Track listing ==
Bill Monroe Sings Country Songs track listing
No.	Title	Writer(s)	Original release	Length
1.	"I'm on My Way to the Old Home" (recorded February 3, 1950)	Bill Monroe	"The First Whippoorwill" B-side (1952)	2:26
2.	"The Sailor's Plea" (recorded April 23, 1951)	Jimmie Rodgers; Elsie McWilliams	"When the Cactus Is in Bloom" B-side (1952)	2:36
3.	"When the Cactus Is in Bloom" (recorded March 29, 1951)	Rodgers	single A-side (1952)	2:03
4.	"The Little Girl and the Dreadful Snake" (recorded July 18, 1952)	Albert Price	single A-side (1953)	2:54
5.	"Peach Pickin' Time in Georgia" (recorded April 23, 1951)	Rodgers; Clayton McMichen	previously unreleased	2:18
6.	"Used to Be" (recorded September 16, 1955)	Monroe	previously unreleased	2:07
7.	"Out in the Cold World" (recorded May 15, 1957)	Joe Ahr	Knee Deep in Blue Grass (1958)	2:36
8.	"Close By" (recorded June 26, 1954)	Monroe; Robert van Winkle	"Blue Moon of Kentucky" B-side (1955)	2:30
9.	"New John Henry Blues" (recorded January 7, 1954)	Wilbur Jones	"Devil's Dream" B-side (1963)	2:29
10.	"A Lonesome Road (To Travel)" (recorded December 15, 1957)	Joe Stuart	Knee Deep in Blue Grass (1958)	2:40
11.	"When the Phone Rang" (recorded January 30, 1959)	Joe Hudgins	previously unreleased	3:08
12.	"No One but My Darlin'" (recorded December 1, 1958)	Monroe	"Gotta Travel On" B-side (1958)	2:05
Total length:				29:52

== Personnel ==
- Bill Monroe — mandolin, vocals (lead on all except track 4; tenor on tracks 1 and 4)
- Jimmy Martin — guitar (tracks 1, 3, 4 and 9), lead vocals (tracks 1 and 4)
- Grady Martin — guitar (tracks 2 and 5)
- Loren "Jack" Shook — guitar (tracks 2 and 5)
- Leslie Sandy — guitar (track 7)
- Edd Mayfield — guitar (track 8)
- Doug Kershaw — guitar (track 10)
- Vernon "Jack" Cooke — guitar (tracks 11 and 12)
- Rudy Lyle — banjo (tracks 1–3, 5 and 9)
- Sonny Osborne — banjo (track 4)
- Joe Stuart — banjo (track 6), fiddle (tracks 7 and 10)
- Don Stover — banjo (track 7)
- Jim Smoak — banjo (track 8)
- Jimmy Elrod — banjo (track 10)
- Robert "Buddy" Pennington — banjo (tracks 11 and 12)
- Vassar Clements — fiddle (track 1)
- James "Hal" Smith — fiddle (tracks 2, 3 and 5)
- Charlie Cline — fiddle (tracks 4, 8 and 9), guitar (track 5)
- Gordon Terry — fiddle (tracks 6–8)
- Bobby Hicks — fiddle (tracks 6, 11 and 12)
- Dale Potter — fiddle (track 7)
- Merle "Red" Taylor — fiddle (track 8)
- Kenny Baker — fiddle (track 10)
- Charlie Smith — fiddle (track 11)
- Joel Price — string bass (tracks 1 and 3)
- Ernie Newton — string bass (tracks 2, 4, 5, 8 and 9)
- Bessie Lee Mauldin — string bass (tracks 6, 7 and 10–12)
- Ferris Coursey — drums (tracks 2 and 5)

== Bibliography ==
- Ewing, Tom (September 7, 2018), Bill Monroe: The Life and Music of the Blue Grass Man (Music in American Life), Champaign, Illinois: University of Illinois Press, ISBN 978-0252041891
