= The High, Lonesome Sound of Bill Monroe and his Blue Grass Boys =

Compilation album by Bill Monroe and his Blue Grass Boys
- Released: June 13, 1966
- Recorded: 1950–1964
- Genre: Bluegrass; gospel
- Length: 32:52
- Label: Decca
- Producer: Paul Cohen; Owen Bradley; Harry Silverstein

Bill Monroe chronology
The Original Blue Grass Sound (1965)	The High, Lonesome Sound of Bill Monroe and his Blue Grass Boys (1966)	Blue Grass Time (1967)

The High, Lonesome Sound of Bill Monroe and his Blue Grass Boys is the eighth compilation album by American bluegrass musician Bill Monroe and his band, the Blue Grass Boys. Released by Decca Records on June 13, 1966, it features 12 songs recorded between 1950 and 1964, ten of which were previously released as singles or B-sides. The album is Decca's third Monroe compilation, after My All Time Country Favorites (1962) and Bluegrass Instrumentals (1965).

== Background ==
The High, Lonesome Sound of Bill Monroe and his Blue Grass Boys was the realisation of an idea conceived by Bill Monroe's manager Ralph Rinzler and label Decca Records to release a career-spanning compilation of the musician, complete with extensive liner notes and recording details for the songs within. The album was originally slated to be called The Bill Monroe Story, with an announcement published in Billboard magazine as early as July 1963 about its impending release, which described the project as "a two-record volume ... [which] will feature all of Monroe's old favorites, some of which have been out of print ... for as many as twenty years".

The title of the album is a reference to the "high lonesome" style of music pioneered by Monroe and other bluegrass musicians during the 1940s and 1950s, described by Kara Kundert of No Depression magazine as "that painful, heartbreaking high tenor pealing out mournfully in the happy-sad songs in our particular musical canon". According to future Blue Grass Boys member and Monroe biographer Tom Ewing, the term was first used in relation to bluegrass music by John Cohen in his 1963 documentary The High Lonesome Sound, then as the title of a Roscoe Holcomb album in 1965. The first recorded use of the term to describe Monroe's music specifically was an advertisement published in the Chicago Tribune, using material provided by Rinzler, for a show featuring Monroe and Doc Watson on October 30, 1964.

== Release ==
Decca released The High, Lonesome Sound of Bill Monroe and his Blue Grass Boys on June 13, 1966. The back cover of the sleeve featured "detailed notes" by Rinzler, which featured "extended comments" from Monroe gathered from interviews between the two held in February 1966. As well as a range of tracks released mainly on singles in the 1950s, the album also features two previously unreleased recordings: "My Dying Bed" from 1952 and "My Little Georgia Rose" from 1954.

== Track listing ==
The High, Lonesome Sound of Bill Monroe and his Blue Grass Boys track listing
No.	Title	Writer(s)	Original release	Length
1.	"My Little Georgia Rose" (recorded June 26, 1954)	Bill Monroe	previously unreleased	2:41
2.	"Letter from My Darlin'" (recorded January 20, 1951)	Monroe	single A-side (1952)	3:05
3.	"Memories of Mother and Dad" (recorded July 18, 1952)	Albert Price	"The Little Girl and the Dreadful Snake" B-side (1953)	2:54
4.	"Highway of Sorrow" (recorded January 27, 1964)	Monroe; Pete Pyle	Saturday Night at the Grand Ole Opry, Vol. 2 (1964)	2:20
5.	"On the Old Kentucky Shore" (recorded January 20, 1951)	Monroe	"Poison Love" B-side (1951)	3:10
6.	"On and On" (recorded January 7, 1954)	Monroe	single A-side (1956)	2:44
7.	"My Dying Bed" (recorded July 18, 1952)	Price	previously unreleased	2:46
8.	"Memories of You" (recorded February 3, 1950)	James B. Smith	"Blue Grass Ramble" B-side (1950)	2:57
9.	"Whitehouse Blues" (recorded January 7, 1954)	Wilbur Jones	single A-side (1954)	2:09
10.	"Sugar Coated Love" (recorded July 6, 1951)	Alec Butler	"Highway of Sorrow" B-side (1951)	2:22
11.	"I'm Blue, I'm Lonesome" (recorded February 3, 1950)	Smith	"Boat of Love" B-side (1950)	2:47
12.	"When the Golden Leaves Begin to Fall" (recorded October 15, 1950)	Price	single A-side (1950)	2:58
Total length:				32:52

== Personnel ==
- Bill Monroe — mandolin, vocals (lead on tracks 1, 4, 9, 11 and 12; tenor on tracks 2, 3, 5–8 and 10–12)
- Edd Mayfield — guitar (track 1)
- Jimmy Martin — guitar and lead vocals (tracks 2, 3, 5–9, 11 and 12)
- Joe Stuart — guitar (track 4)
- Grady Martin — guitar (track 9)
- Carter Stanley — guitar (track 10)
- Jim Smoak — banjo (track 1)
- Rudy Lyle — banjo (tracks 2, 5, 6 and 8–12)
- Sonny Osborne — banjo (tracks 3 and 7)
- Joe Drumright — banjo (track 4)
- Charlie Cline — fiddle (tracks 1, 3, 6, 7 and 9), baritone vocals (track 6)
- Merle "Red" Taylor — fiddle (tracks 1, 2, 5 and 12)
- Gordon Terry — fiddle (tracks 1 and 10)
- Horace "Benny" Williams — fiddle (track 4)
- Vassar Clements — fiddle (tracks 8 and 11)
- Ernie Newton — string bass (tracks 1, 3, 6, 7 and 9)
- Joel Price — string bass (tracks 2, 5, 8, 11 and 12), baritone vocals (track 12)
- Bessie Lee Mauldin — string bass (track 4)
- Howard "Cedric Rainwater" Watts — string bass (track 10)

== Bibliography ==
- Ewing, Tom (September 7, 2018), Bill Monroe: The Life and Music of the Blue Grass Man (Music in American Life), Champaign, Illinois: University of Illinois Press, ISBN 978-0252041891
