= My All Time Country Favorites =

Compilation album by Bill Monroe and his Blue Grass Boys
- Released: October 8, 1962
- Recorded: 1950–1958
- Genre: Bluegrass; gospel
- Length: 29:28
- Label: Decca
- Producer: Paul Cohen; Owen Bradley

Bill Monroe chronology
| The Father of Bluegrass Music (1962) | My All Time Country Favorites (1962) | Bluegrass Special (1963) |

My All Time Country Favorites is the third compilation album by American bluegrass musician Bill Monroe and his band, the Blue Grass Boys. Released by Decca Records on October 8, 1962, it features 12 songs recorded between 1950 and 1958 for the label, 11 of which were originally released as singles or B-sides. The album features recordings from various lineups of the Blue Grass Boys, with members such as Jimmy Martin, Rudy Lyle and Charlie Cline featured prominently across the collection.

== Background ==
By 1962, Bill Monroe had been signed as a recording artist with Decca Records for 12 years, having debuted in March 1950 with a re-recorded version of his first single, "Mule Skinner Blues". He entered the growing album market for the first time in 1958 with Knee Deep in Blue Grass and I Saw the Light, which had been followed in 1961 by Mr. Blue Grass and 1962 by Bluegrass Ramble. My All Time Country Favorites was Decca's first compilation of Monroe tracks, intended to cover the period between 1950 and 1958 when all songs were released on singles only, thereby marking the first appearances of all featured tracks in the LP format.

== Release ==
My All Time Country Favorites was released by Decca on October 8, 1962. Aside from 11 tracks released as singles or B-sides during the featured period, the album also included one previously unreleased recording, of the Jimmie Davis track "Plant Some Flowers on My Grave", from 1954. Future Blue Grass Boys stand-in member and Monroe biographer Neil Rosenberg, then a student and fan of the musician, has suggested that Monroe was not consulted or even informed about the album's existence before its release, recalling that he had bought the album and asked Monroe to sign it at a show. He explained: "It was at once obvious that he had never seen this particular album before. He put on his glasses, read the list of titles and the notes on the back of the jacket; he turned it over and looked at the front picture, and then, shaking his head, carefully turned the cover back over and signed it so that the autograph was upside down in relation to the printing on the back."

== Reception ==
My All Time Country Favorites received positive reviews from critics. Billboard Music Week wrote that "Bill Monroe gives out with the wild and frantic, high-pitched tones in this program composed of his own favorites in the field", calling it "Great wax indeed, for the faithful". In a brief review, Cash Box magazine called the album a "fine bluegrass entry", praising the performances of the band and the choice of songs.

== Track listing ==
My All Time Country Favorites track listing
| No. | Title | Writer(s) | Original release | Length |
|---|---|---|---|---|
| 1. | "Gotta Travel On" (recorded December 1, 1958) | Paul Clayton | single A-side (1958) | 2:32 |
| 2. | "Four Walls" (recorded April 20, 1957) | Marvin Moore; George Campbell | single A-side (1957) | 2:20 |
| 3. | "Roanoke" (recorded December 31, 1954) | Joe Ahr | "Cheyenne" B-side (1955) | 2:36 |
| 4. | "Uncle Pen" (recorded October 15, 1950) | Bill Monroe | "When the Golden Leaves Fall" B-side (1950) | 2:42 |
| 5. | "Y'all Come" (recorded January 8, 1954) | Arlie Duff | "Changing Partners" B-side (1954) | 2:14 |
| 6. | "Happy on My Way" (recorded January 14, 1954) | Pete Pyle | single A-side (1954) | 2:11 |
| 7. | "Blue Moon of Kentucky" (recorded September 4, 1954) | Monroe | single A-side (1954) | 2:08 |
| 8. | "New Mule Skinner Blues" (recorded February 3, 1950) | Jimmie Rodgers; George Vaughn Horton | single A-side (1950) | 2:27 |
| 9. | "Cheyenne" (recorded December 31, 1954) | Monroe | single A-side (1955) | 2:47 |
| 10. | "A Fallen Star" (recorded April 20, 1957) | James Joiner | "Four Walls" B-side (1958) | 2:10 |
| 11. | "Plant Some Flowers by My Grave" (recorded January 8, 1954) | Jimmie Davis; Rupert McClendon | previously unreleased | 2:40 |
| 12. | "Footprints in the Snow" (recorded July 18, 1952) | Rupert Jones | single A-side (1952) | 2:41 |
| Total length: | | | | 29:28 |

== Personnel ==
- Bill Monroe — mandolin, vocals (tenor on track 4 chorus and track 6, lead on others)
- Jack Cooke — guitar (track 1)
- Joe Stuart — guitar (tracks 2 and 10)
- Jackie Phelps — guitar (tracks 3 and 9)
- Jimmy Martin — guitar (tracks 4–6, 8, 11 and 12), lead vocals (track 4 chorus and track 6)
- Grady Martin — guitar (tracks 5 and 11)
- Edd Mayfield — guitar (track 7)
- Buddy Pennington — banjo (track 1)
- Don Stover — banjo (tracks 2 and 10)
- Hubert Davis — banjo (tracks 3 and 9)
- Rudy Lyle — banjo (tracks 4, 5, 8 and 11)
- Jim Smoak — banjo (track 7)
- Sonny Osborne — banjo (track 12)
- Bobby Hicks — fiddle (tracks 1, 3 and 9)
- Gordon Terry — fiddle (tracks 2, 7 and 10)
- Tommy Jackson — fiddle (tracks 2 and 10)
- Charlie Cline — fiddle (tracks 3, 5, 7, 9, 11 and 12), baritone vocals (track 6)
- Merle "Red" Taylor — fiddle (tracks 4 and 7)
- Vassar Clements — fiddle (track 8)
- Bessie Lee Mauldin — string bass (tracks 1, 2 and 10)
- Ernie Newton — string bass (tracks 3, 5–7, 9, 11 and 12)
- Joel Price — string bass (tracks 4 and 8), baritone vocals (track 4)
- Milton Estes — bass vocals (track 6)

== Bibliography ==
- Ewing, Tom (September 7, 2018), Bill Monroe: The Life and Music of the Blue Grass Man (Music in American Life), Champaign, Illinois: University of Illinois Press, ISBN 978-0252041891
