= Early Blue Grass Music =

Compilation album by The Monroe Brothers
- Released: June 1963
- Recorded: 1936–1949
- Genre: Country; folk; gospel
- Length: 33:30
- Label: RCA Camden

Charlie Monroe chronology
Bluegrass Sound (1963)	Early Blue Grass Music (1963)	Lord Build Me a Cabin (1965)

Bill Monroe chronology
Bluegrass Special (1963)	Early Blue Grass Music (1963)	Bill Monroe Sings Country Songs (1964)

Early Blue Grass Music is a compilation album by American country duo The Monroe Brothers, consisting of Charlie and Bill Monroe. Released by RCA Camden in late-June 1963, it features 12 songs by the brothers, six of which were recorded during their initial tenure between 1936 and 1938. The other six were recorded after the duo's disbandment in 1938 by two Charlie-fronted projects — Charlie Monroe's Boys and Charlie Monroe and his Kentucky Pardners — four of which feature Bill.

== Background ==
RCA Camden released Early Blue Grass Music in late-1963. The album features six tracks recorded by Charlie and Bill Monroe during their time as The Monroe Brothers and six recorded as part of Charlie-led projects after their disbandment. In his book Bill Monroe: The Life and Music of the Blue Grass Man, Tom Ewing called the album "deceptively titled", noting that the recordings are "Not bluegrass, early or otherwise", as they pre-date the genre's development and creation.

== Reception ==
Early Blue Grass Music received positive reviews from critics. Billboard claimed that "For collectors, this should have considerable interest", suggesting that "The early dueting of the brothers, as reproduced here, is historically of interest". Similarly, Cash Box magazines noted that "Devout followers of this school of folk music will appreciate [The Monroe Brothers'] handling of 'Weeping Willow Tree,' 'Don’t Forget Me,' 'Bringin' In The Georgia Mail' and 'Rosa Lee McFall'."

== Track listing ==
Early Blue Grass Music track listing
No.	Title	Writer(s)	Original release	Length
1.	"New River Train"	Traditional	"Little Red Shoes" B-side (1936)	3:35
2.	"No Home, No Place to Pillow My Head"	Traditional	single A-side (1938)	2:05
3.	"The Great Speckled Bird"	Guy Smith; Charlie Swain	single A-side (1938)	2:10
4.	"Once I Had a Darling Mother"	Traditional	previously unreleased	3:17
5.	"On the Banks of the Ohio"	Traditional	single A-side (1936)	3:30
6.	"Rosa Lee McFall"	Charlie Monroe	"They Didn't Believe It Was True" B-side (1949)	2:30
7.	"Bringin' in the Georgia Mail"	Fred Rose	single A-side (1947)	2:50
8.	"Weeping Willow Tree"	Traditional	single A-side (1937)	3:16
9.	"Just a Song of Old Kentucky"	Bill Monroe	single A-side (1936)	2:20
10.	"Don't Forget Me"	C. W. Vance; R. S. Crandall	"Just a Song of Old Kentucky" B-side (1936)	2:37
11.	"I Am Thinking Tonight of the Old Folks"	C. Monroe	single A-side (1937)	2:30
12.	"Mother's Not Dead, She's Only Sleeping"	B. Monroe	single A-side (1946)	2:50
Total length:				33:30

Notes

- Tracks 1, 5 and 8–11 were recorded by The Monroe Brothers
- Tracks 2–4 were recorded by Charlie Monroe's Boys
- Tracks 6, 7 and 12 were recorded by Charlie Monroe and his Kentucky Pardners

== Personnel ==
- Charlie Monroe — guitar, lead vocals
- Bill Monroe — mandolin and tenor vocals (all except tracks 2 and 3)
- Bill Calhoun — guitar and backing vocals (tracks 2 and 3)
- Claude "Zeke" Morris — mandolin and backing vocals (tracks 2 and 3)
