= Clarence Wilson =

Clarence Wilson may refer to:

- Clarence Wilson (actor) (1876–1941), American actor
- Clarence Remus Wilson, early 20th-century American musician, who played Old-time music
