= Rosine General Store and Barn =

- U.S. National Register of Historic Places
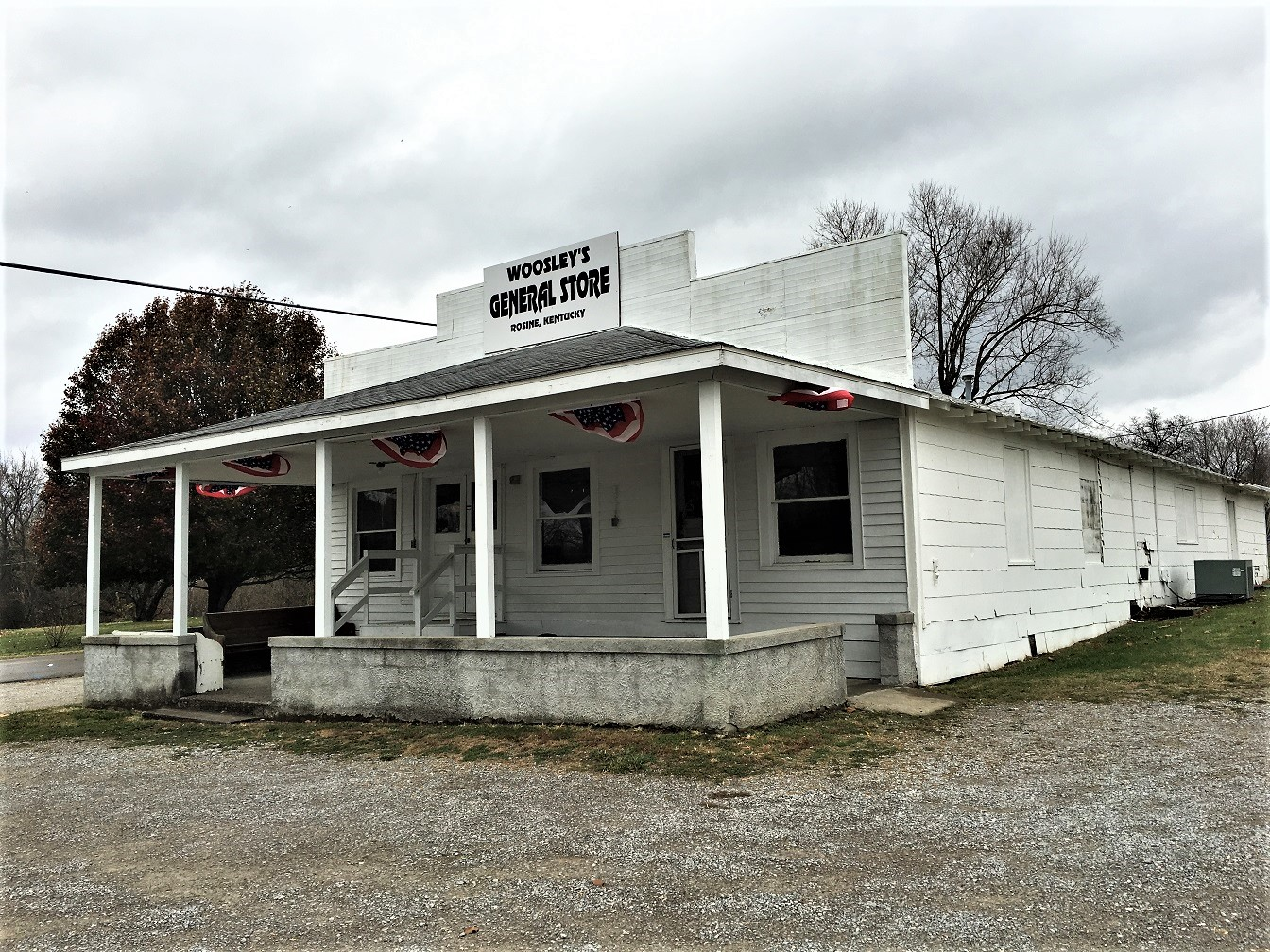

- Location within Kentucky Location within the United States
- Location: 8205 Blue Moon of Kentucky--US 62, Rosine, Kentucky
- Coordinates: 37.450834°N 86.741106°W
- Area: less than one acre
- Built: 1933, 1947
- Built by: Woosley, Everett R.
- NRHP reference No.: 03000708
- Added to NRHP: August 1, 2003

The Rosine General Store and Barn, also known as Woosley's General Store, is in the small hamlet of Rosine, Kentucky located at 8205 Blue Moon of Kentucky Highway / U.S. Route 62. It was built in 1933 and expanded in 1947. It was listed on the National Register of Historic Places in 2003.

It was a 32 by 40 feet (9.8 m × 12.2 m) structure when bought in 1943 by Edith and Everett Woosley. They added an extension to make it 32 by 70 feet (9.8 m × 21.3 m). Also on the property is a 32 by 50 feet (9.8 m × 15.2 m) board-and-batten vertical plank barn.
