= Mr. Blue Grass =

Studio album by Bill Monroe and his Blue Grass Boys
- Released: May 29, 1961
- Recorded: November 30–December 3, 1960
- Studio: Bradley Film & Recording Studio (Nashville, Tennessee)
- Genre: Bluegrass
- Length: 31:08
- Label: Decca
- Producer: Owen Bradley

Bill Monroe chronology
The Great Bill Monroe and his Blue Grass Boys (1961)	Mr. Blue Grass (1961)	Bluegrass Ramble (1962)

Singles from Mr. Blue Grass
- 1. "Linda Lou" Released: February 27, 1961; 2. "Flowers of Love" Released: January 1, 1962

Mr. Blue Grass is the third studio album by American bluegrass musician Bill Monroe and his band, the Blue Grass Boys. Released on May 29, 1961, by Decca Records, it features 12 songs recorded across three sessions at Bradley Film & Recording Studio in Nashville, Tennessee between November 30 and December 3, 1960, produced by Owen Bradley. Two songs from the album were released as singles: "Linda Lou" in February 1961 and "Flowers of Love" in January 1962.

== Background ==
By late-1960, bluegrass music had suffered a dip in popularity due to the continuing success of rock and roll and the pop-influenced "Nashville sound" movement of country music, which future Blue Grass Boys member and Bill Monroe biographer Tom Ewing claimed made the genre seem "more out of step than ever before". The core lineup of the Blue Grass Boys that year featured banjo player Tony Ellis, fiddler Dale Potter and bassist Bessie Lee Mauldin, with rotating musicians filling in for short periods of time on guitar — these included Jimmy Byrd at the beginning of the year, Porter Church in the summer, and Frank Buchanan in the fall. Ellis took several leaves of absence due to "the scarcity of work", although there were signs of renewed interest in bluegrass due to the effects of the American folk music revival.

By November 1960, Bobby Smith had taken over as the Blue Grass Boys' guitarist and lead singer, while Ellis had taken another leave of absence and left town, recalling that "Bill didn't have anything booked, not even the Opry". Smith was not scheduled to take part in the three upcoming recording sessions for Monroe's third album, with Carl Butler already in place to play guitar. To fill in for Ellis, Monroe enlisted the services of previous stand-in Curtis McPeake, which Ewing has proposed may have been an "aggravated" response to Ellis taking leave. Regular band members Potter and Mauldin were included in the sessions on fiddle and bass, respectively.

== Recording ==
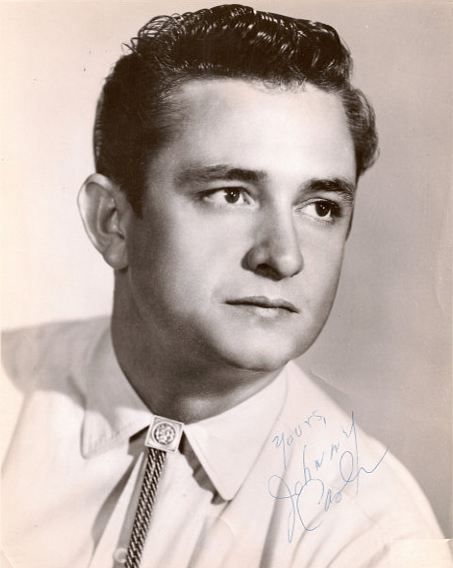
The first song recorded at the final session for Mr. Blue Grass was a cover of Johnny Cash's "Big River".

The first recording session for what would become Mr. Blue Grass took place on November 30, 1960. During this session, the group recorded George Vaughn Horton's "Sold Down the River", guitarist Carl Butler's "Linda Lou" (which he had originally recorded in 1951), the traditional "You Live in a World All Your Own", and Bill Monroe's own "Little Joe" (which he had originally recorded with brother Charlie in 1938). The next day, the band recorded four more songs for the album: George W. Edgins and Roy Acuff's "Put My Rubber Doll Away", the Louvin Brothers' "Seven Year Blues", the Tommy Duncan-written Bob Wills song "Time Changes Everything", and finally the folk standard "Lonesome Road Blues", which banjo player Curtis McPeake suggested when they were unsure what to record last.

On December 2, when Monroe and the band were taking a day off from recording, Tony Ellis returned to Nashville from his leave of absence. Meeting Monroe and Bessie Lee Mauldin the next day in a restaurant by chance, he agreed to perform bass at the third and final session for the album, as Mauldin's fingers were "blistered and sore" from the two previous sessions. At the final session, the group started with a cover version of Johnny Cash's 1958 hit "Big River", the lyrics for which McPeake had written down for Monroe to sing by listening to the album Johnny Cash Sings the Songs That Made Him Famous after the December 1 session. This was followed by recordings of "Flowers of Love" (written by Ellen Martin and Monroe), "It's Mighty Dark to Travel" (a Monroe original which he'd recorded with the "classic bluegrass band" lineup as a B-side in 1947) and a hastily composed instrumental they called "Blue Grass Part One".

== Release ==
The first songs released from Mr. Blue Grass were "Linda Lou" and "Put My Rubber Doll Away", which made up a single issued by Decca on February 27, 1961. The album followed on May 29, 1961. Mr. Blue Grass was Monroe's first album whose sleeve featured a photo of him, taken by Decca photographer Marc Brody in May 1960. Unlike previous albums Knee Deep in Blue Grass and I Saw the Light, Decca did not issue a separate extended play (EP) alongside Mr. Blue Grass; however, the tracks "You Live in a World All Your Own", "Little Joe" and "Blue Grass Part One" were issued alongside "John Hardy" (from the 1962 follow-up album Bluegrass Ramble) on an EP in October 1962. "Flowers of Love" was released as the second single from Mr. Blue Grass on January 1, 1962, backed with "Blue Grass Part One", which Ewing has suggested was done to capitalise on the increased popularity of a dance called the twist, which could be performed in conjunction with the instrumental (which was later released under the name "Blue Grass Twist").

== Track listing ==
Mr. Blue Grass track listing
No.	Title	Writer(s)	Length
1.	"Linda Lou" (recorded November 30, 1960)	Carl Butler	2:10
2.	"Little Joe" (recorded November 30, 1960)	Bill Monroe	2:58
3.	"Seven Year Blues" (recorded December 1, 1960)	Ira Louvin; Charlie Louvin; Eddie Hill	3:05
4.	"You Live in a World All Your Own" (recorded November 30, 1960)	Traditional, arr. Monroe	2:34
5.	"Time Changes Everything" (recorded December 1, 1960)	Tommy Duncan	2:15
6.	"Blue Grass Part One" (recorded December 3, 1960)	Monroe	2:46
7.	"Big River" (recorded December 3, 1960)	Johnny Cash	2:11
8.	"Flowers of Love" (recorded December 3, 1960)	Ellen Martin; Monroe	3:04
9.	"It's Mighty Dark to Travel" (recorded December 3, 1960)	Monroe	2:03
10.	"Sold Down the River" (recorded November 30, 1960)	George Vaughn Horton	2:29
11.	"Put My Rubber Doll Away" (recorded December 1, 1960)	George W. Edgins; Roy Acuff	3:01
12.	"Lonesome Road Blues" (recorded December 1, 1960)	Traditional, arr. Monroe	2:32
Total length:			31:08

== Personnel ==
- Bill Monroe — mandolin, vocals
- Carl Butler — guitar
- Curtis McPeake — banjo
- Dale Potter — fiddle
- Bessie Lee Mauldin — string bass (all except tracks 6–9)
- Tony Ellis — string bass (tracks 6–9)

== Bibliography ==
- Ewing, Tom (September 7, 2018), Bill Monroe: The Life and Music of the Blue Grass Man (Music in American Life), Champaign, Illinois: University of Illinois Press, ISBN 978-0252041891
