= Clarence Remus Wilson =

American farmer and musician

Clarence Wilson
- Born: Clarence Remus Wilson
- Origin: Ohio County, Kentucky, US
- Genres: Old-time music
- Occupation(s): Artist, musician
- Instruments: Fiddle, Banjo
- Years active: 1920s

Clarence Remus Wilson was a Rosine, Kentucky farmer who also played the fiddle and five-string banjo. He has been called one of the "greats" of hillbilly music, along with James "Uncle Pen" Vandiver, Kennedy Jones, and Bill Monroe. He also played with Blues musician Arnold Schultz, when Schultz was in town. There is a photo of Schultz and Wilson sitting outside on folding chairs, posing with their instruments, Schultz with his guitar and Wilson with his fiddle.
