= I Hear a Sweet Voice Calling =

"I Hear A Sweet Voice Calling"

Song by Bill Monroe

from the album Blue Moon of Kentucky
- Released: 1947
- Recorded: 1946
- Genre: Bluegrass
- Songwriter(s): Bill Monroe

I Hear A Sweet Voice Calling is a song written and originally recorded by Bill Monroe, who sang lead and also added a tenor harmony to the chorus in his October 27, 1947 recording on the Columbia Records label. It appears on his album Blue Moon of Kentucky.

== Themes and reception ==
The song is about a dying girl who faces the sure prospect of going to heaven, with the opening lyrics; "Our little girl had taken sick one evening as she walked home from school and then her deathbed soon claimed her, it made us so sad and so blue. As Robert Cantwell put it in his book Bluegrass breakdown: the making of the old southern sound, "the sick child leaves the world with a rebuke to her parents, whose tears imply that their faith has been shaken." In the recording, Joe Val sang in falsetto on this song; he was a strong tenor on most songs. Bluegrass Unlimited said "His songs were at once tragic and filled with a radiant life force, in music as heart-wrenchingly old-fashioned as "I Hear A Sweet Voice Calling". Monroe has also performed it live with the Osborne Brothers and it was described "achingly beautiful yet electrically exciting music, ruefully outdated by time."

== Elvis Presley recording ==
Elvis Presley recorded a brief, rough version on 4 December 1956 and had also recorded Monroe's other songs such as Blue Moon of Kentucky, Little Cabin on the Hill, Summertime Has Passed and Gone and Sweetheart, You Done Me Wrong. Elvis was a major fan of bluegrass artist Monroe. Elvis altered Monroe's original waltz time to a rocking 4/4 boogie beat and claimed that it was songs such as I Hear A Sweet Voice Calling which were of major importance in the development of rock and roll.
