= Jimmy Martin =

American bluegrass singer and musician (1927–2005)

Background information
- Born: James Henry Martin; August 10, 1927; Sneedville, Tennessee, U.S.
- Died: May 14, 2005 (aged 77) Nashville, Tennessee, U.S.
- Genres: Bluegrass
- Occupation: Musician
- Instruments: Vocals, guitar, mandolin
- Years active: 1949–2005
- Labels: Decca, Coral, MCA, Gusto

James Henry Martin (August 10, 1927 – May 14, 2005) was an American bluegrass singer and musician, known as the "King of Bluegrass".

== Early years ==
Martin was born in Sneedville, Tennessee, United States, and was raised in the hard farming life of rural East Tennessee. He grew up near Sneedville, singing in church and with friends from surrounding farms. His mother and stepfather who used to sing gospel were his first influences. When he was in his teens he played guitar in a local string band and later appeared on radio with Tex Climer and the Blue Band Coffee Boys.

== Music career ==
In the winter of 1949, Mac Wiseman had just left Bill Monroe's Blue Grass Boys. Martin, who wanted to apply for the vacant post as guitarist, rode the bus into Nashville. He snuck in backstage at the Grand Ole Opry. While picking his guitar, he was overheard by the Blue Grass Boys' banjo player Rudy Lyle, who brought him forward and presented him to Monroe. Martin sang two songs with Monroe and was hired.

Beginning in 1949, Martin was lead vocalist for Bill Monroe's Blue Grass Boys. Martin's high voice mixed with Monroe's tenor came to be known as the "high lonesome" sound. His influence radically changed Monroe's music from the fast-paced but smooth style of the "original" 1945 band with Flatt and Scruggs. Martin challenged Monroe to raise the pitch on many of his classics and to write new, "lonesome" songs. This band with Rudy Lyle (banjo) and Charlie Cline (fiddle) was one of the many high points of Monroe's career. Martin's lead was defining in "lonesome" songs such as "Sitting Alone in the Moonlight", "Memories of Mother and Dad" and "I'm Blue, I'm Lonesome".

Martin had a famously high-strung and exuberant personality, and inevitably clashed with Monroe's equally stubborn temperament. He left Monroe and worked briefly with the Osborne Brothers until he formed his own band, The Sunny Mountain Boys, in 1955. The classic line-up of this band, with J. D. Crowe and "Big" Paul Williams (stage name for Paul Humphrey), defined his "Good 'n Country" style, a commercially oriented, crowd-pleasing bluegrass with simple harmonies, catchy melodies, and a strong rhythm propelled by Martin's effective guitar playing. He credited himself with inventing the "G" run, a guitar lick used widely in the bluegrass genre. However, aural evidence from the period before Martin began performing professionally, clearly shows Lester Flatt using this run when backing Bill Monroe.

Three important components of Martin's unique sound, besides his cutting tenor voice, were tight trio singing, sometimes a female high-baritone fourth part, and the use of a snare drum in place of mandolin to keep the back-beat.

Among Martin's biggest hits of the 1960s were "Hit Parade of Love", "Sophronie", "Stepping Stones", "Tennessee", and "Widow Maker" (a popular truck driver's song). His instrumentals (with the Sunny Mountain Boys), such as "Theme Time", "Bear Tracks" and "Red Rooster", featured ultra-crisp playing by a series of banjo players including Sam "Porky" Hutchins, J.D. Crowe, Vernon McIntyre Jr. and Bill Emerson, and, powered by Martin's guitar runs, set a standard for bluegrass instrumentals that was influential.

In the 1960s and 1970s, Jimmy Martin's Sunny Mountain Boys included singer and instrumentalist Gloria Belle, who is considered the first female lead singer in bluegrass. She toured Japan with Martin during 1975. In regards to her playing, Martin said jokingly, "She's not very good, but we let her sing with us 'cause we feel sorry for her."

Martin was known for his unpredictable yet highly energetic stage performances. He openly discussed his struggles with alcohol use and mood swings, which have been cited as factors that prevented him from achieving his goal of joining the Grand Ole Opry.

He made frequent appearances on the Louisiana Hayride and Wheeling, West Virginia's WWVA Jamboree (renamed Jamboree U.S.A. in the 1960s), as well as the Grand Ole Opry, but was never invited to join the latter. In 1973, he performed on Bill Monroe's Brown County Jamboree.

He performed on the Nitty Gritty Dirt Band's 1971 album Will the Circle Be Unbroken, as well as Volume II (1989) and Volume III (2002).

He joined producers Randall Franks and Alan Autry for the In the Heat of the Night cast CD Christmas Time's A Comin', performing "Christmas Time's A Comin'" with the cast on the CD released on Sonlite and MGM/UA.

== Death ==
Martin died in Nashville on May 14, 2005, after having been diagnosed with bladder cancer more than a year earlier. He is interred in the Spring Hill Cemetery in Nashville's Madison neighborhood. A report of his death in the Toronto Star called him "one of the greatest vocalists in bluegrass."

== Legacy ==
In 1995, Martin was inducted into the International Bluegrass Music Hall of Honor. A documentary on his life, King of Bluegrass: The Life and Times of Jimmy Martin, was released in 2003. Martin is also featured in the documentary film High Lonesome: The Story of Bluegrass Music.

Martin's hobby was raccoon hunting with dogs; he featured his hunting dogs on the covers of several LP albums and wrote songs celebrating their prowess. His troubles with the Nashville music industry are memorialized in "The Death of Jimmy Martin", a song by Tom Russell on The Wounded Heart of America album.

== Discography ==
=== Albums ===
Year	Album	US Country	Label
1960	Good 'n Country	—	Decca
1962	Country Music Time	—	Decca
1963	This World Is Not My Home	—	Decca
1964	Widow Maker	—	Decca
1965	Sunny Side of the Mountain	—	Decca
1966	Good 'n Country Music	—	Decca
1967	Big and Country Instrumentals	—	Decca
1968	Tennessee	42	Decca
1969	Free Born Man	—	Decca
1970	Singing All Day	—	Decca
1972	I'd Like to Be Sixteen Again	—	Decca
1973	Moonshine Hollow	—	Coral
1974	Fly Me to Frisco	—	MCA
1978	Greatest Bluegrass Hits	—	Gusto
1980	Will the Circle Be Unbroken	—	Gusto
1980	Me'n Old Pete	—	Gusto
1980	To Mother at Christmas	—	Gusto
1980	First Time Together (with Ralph Stanley)	—	Gusto
1982	One Woman Man	—	Gusto

=== Singles ===
Year	Single	US Country	Album
1958	"Rock Hearts"	14	single only
1959	"Night"	26	Good'n Country
1964	"Widow Maker"	19	Widow Maker
1966	"I Can't Quit Cigarettes"	49	Good'n Country Music
1968	"Tennessee"	72	Tennessee

=== Guest singles ===
Year	Single	Artist	US Country	Album
1973	"Grand Ole Opry Song"	Nitty Gritty Dirt Band	97	Will the Circle Be Unbroken

== See also ==
- Thomas Edd Mayfield
