= Sally Ann Forrester =

Wilene "Sally Ann" Forrester (December 20, 1922 – November 17, 1999), also known as Billie Forrester, was an American musician considered to be "the first woman in bluegrass", having been employed by Bill Monroe (considered the "father" of bluegrass music) and his band, the Blue Grass Boys, from 1943 to 1946.

== Early life ==
Goldie Sue Wilene Russell was born in Raton, New Mexico. At the age of three, after her mother's death, Wilene was taken in by her maternal grandparents in Avant, Oklahoma. Her grandfather, a fiddler, introduced her to music and performing. By the sixth grade, she was playing piano, classical violin, and guitar. At the age of fifteen, she attended the high school academy at Southwest Baptist College in Bolivar, Missouri, where she adopted the name "Billie". There she studied orchestra, piano, and voice, and participated in the glee club. After two years, her schooling was interrupted by the beginning of her musical career.

== Musical career ==
In 1939, at the age of seventeen, she won a spot on the new Saddle Mountain Roundup (SMR) radio show on KVOO, Tulsa, playing guitar and singing. There, she met and began dating a seventeen-year-old Texan fiddler Howard "Howdy" Forrester. They performed together during the year that SMR was broadcast, and married soon after the show dissolved. In winter 1942, after moving to Nashville, the Forresters performed for a tent show, which also featured Bill Monroe and the Blue Grass Boys. When Monroe's fiddler, Art Wooten, left for the military, Howdy was hired as his replacement. When the tent show folded, both Howdy and Billie continued to perform with Monroe.

In spring 1943, Howdy left for the Navy, and "Sally Ann", as Billie was now called by Monroe, continued singing and playing the accordion, as well as keeping the books, for the Blue Grass Boys. She was a band member, along with Lester Flatt, when banjo pioneer Earl Scruggs joined in late 1945. Within a week of Scruggs joining the band, Howdy returned to reclaim his spot as fiddler. The Forresters stayed with Monroe through the end of March, 1946, when they moved back to Howdy's home in Texas.

=== Later life ===
In January 1947, Sally Ann, now "Billie" again, gave birth to their only child, Bob, after which she performed only rarely. In 1949, the Forresters returned to Nashville, where Howdy continued his musical career. Billie retired from performing, and subsequently worked for the Social Security Administration for thirty years. Howdy died of cancer complications on August 1, 1987. Twelve years later, Sally Ann died, at the age of 76, from complications of Alzheimer's disease.

=== Legacy ===
In the largely male-dominated world of bluegrass music, her work with Monroe has often been dismissed as simply "holding a place for Howdy". However, knowledge of her extensive musical talent and performing prowess lays waste to such sexism. If the origin of bluegrass is defined as the union of the "big three" (Bill Monroe, Lester Flatt, and Earl Scruggs), then, as a member of that band, Sally Ann Forrester is truly the first woman in bluegrass.

== Sources ==
- Henry, Murphy H.; Wolfe, Charles K. (2001). Come Prepared To Stay. Bring Fiddle. Country Music Annual 2001. Lexington, KY: U of Kentucky.
- Henry, Murphy (2013). Pretty Good for a Girl Women in Bluegrass. Urbana: U of Illinois.
