= Charlie Monroe =

American country and bluegrass guitarist (1903–1975)

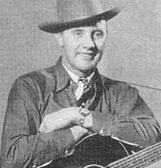
- Monroe in 1936

Background information
- Born: July 4, 1903; Rosine, Kentucky, U.S.
- Died: September 27, 1975 (aged 72) Reidsville, North Carolina, U.S.
- Genres: Country, Bluegrass music
- Occupations: Singer, Guitarist
- Instrument: Guitar
- Years active: 1920s–1957; 1972–1974
- Label: Decca Records

Charlie Monroe (July 4, 1903 – September 27, 1975) was an American country and bluegrass music guitarist. Charlie performed with his brother, Bill, as part of the Monroe Brothers. He later formed his own group, Charlie Monroe & the Kentucky Pardners.

== Biography ==
Charlie Monroe was born on his family's farm in Rosine, Kentucky; he was the older brother of the mandolin player Bill Monroe. His sister Bertha also played guitar, and brother Birch, fiddle. Charlie, Birch, and Bill played together as a band in the middle of the 1920s, and played on radio starting in 1927. Soon after this, however, their parents died and Charlie and Birch moved to Detroit and then Indiana to find work, eventually taking jobs in oil refineries near Hammond, Indiana. Bill followed them into the oil business in 1929, and the three continued performing in small-time and private venues.

=== The Monroe Brothers ===
Tom Owen, a musician on the WLS Barn Dance radio program, heard them play at a dance club in 1932 and asked them to join his group as dancers. They accepted, and toured with Owen for the next two years. In 1934, they once again got offers to play music, this time for Indiana radio stations WAE and WJKS. Not long after this, Texas Crystals, a pharmaceutical company, offered to sponsor the Monroes for a radio program of their own. When Birch refused the offer, Bill and Charlie took the bill as The Monroe Brothers.

The resulting program was so successful that it eventually became a daily broadcast on Charlotte, North Carolina station WBT. Texas Crystals dropped the sponsorship in 1936, but Crazy Water Crystal Company picked it up, and the brothers continued with the show. That same year, the brothers first recorded together for Bluebird Records. Bill and Charlie recorded together for the next two years, but Bill chafed under Charlie's role as the usual lead singer. Both brothers were hot-headed and hard-working and felt they could succeed on their own. Charlie was comfortable leading a band, more so than his brother Bill as a result of his outgoing personality, and they split in 1938.

=== Solo career ===
Each then formed his own band, with Bill starting The Kentuckians (later the Blue Grass Boys) and Charlie, The Kentucky Pardners. Charlie brought members of the Monroe Brothers act with him to Knoxville and then to Roanoke playing on radio stations. By this time he had hired Bill Calhoun and Zeke Morris, and he was attempting a re-creation of the Monroe Brothers duet sound. He spent most of his time during the early 1940s in Greensboro, North Carolina at radio station WBIG, where he was featured on a show called the Noonday Jamboree every day. He also spent some time in '44 and '45 at WSJS in Winston-Salem, North Carolina. A number of noted bluegrass musicians played with Charlie's band, including Lester Flatt, Red Rector, Curly Seckler, Fiddlin' Dale Cole, Olen Gardner and Ira Louvin. The Kentucky Pardners enjoyed considerable success as a touring outfit in the American South throughout the 1940s.

Charlie signed with RCA Victor in 1946 and with Decca Records in 1950; he wrote and recorded a large body of material and continued to tour relentlessly until he announced his retirement in 1957. He moved back to his farm and, after the death of his first wife, worked in manual labor in Indiana again. He remarried in 1969. On July 3 of the same year, he performed with Bill and Birch at the Smithsonian Festival of American Folklife.

Monroe was asked by Jimmy Martin to play at the Gettysburg Bluegrass Festival in 1972. His performance was a great success.

=== Death ===
He continued to play festivals until diagnosed with cancer in 1974; he died at his farm in Reidsville, North Carolina in 1975 and was buried in his family's plot.
