= Pendleton Vandiver =

American musician

Background information
- Also known as: Uncle Pen
- Born: James Pendleton Vandiver; 1869
- Origin: Butler County, Kentucky, US
- Died: 1932 (aged 62–63)
- Genres: Old-time music
- Occupation(s): Old-time music artist and square dance musician
- Instrument: Fiddle
- Years active: 1920s – 1932

James Pendleton Vandiver (1869–1932) was a Kentucky fiddler, born there shortly after the American Civil War. He was the uncle to bluegrass musician Bill Monroe, who immortalized him in a song, "Uncle Pen".

Monroe used to hear his uncle playing fiddle on the hilltop where he lived, while Monroe put away his mules at night. He later said that Vandiver was "the fellow that I learned how to play from." Vandiver played fiddle at local square dances and social events, and his nephew backed him up, playing mandolin. Monroe's parents had both died by the time he was 16, and he lived part of the time with his Uncle Pen, in his two-room hilltop house in Rosine, Kentucky. Vandiver had been crippled earlier, and he made some money with his music. Bill Monroe's biographer, Richard D. Smith writes, "Pen gave Bill more: a repertoire of tunes that sank into Bill's aurally trained memory and a sense of rhythm that seeped into his bones. Sometimes Bill played guitar behind his uncle, sometimes the mandolin."

On September 13, 1973, a monument in honor of Uncle Pen was unveiled by Monroe at the Rosine Cemetery. Another way he honored Penn's memory was to play the part of "Uncle Penn" in Ricky Skaggs' Country Boy music video.
