= Birch Monroe =

Bluegrass musician (1901–1982)

- Monroe at Bill Monroe's Second Annual Kentucky Bluegrass Festival, Jackson, Kentucky, August 1972

Background information
- Born: Birch Monroe; May 16, 1901; Rosine, Kentucky, U.S.
- Died: May 15, 1982 (aged 80)
- Genres: Old time, bluegrass
- Occupations: Musician, dancer
- Instruments: Fiddle, bass, vocals
- Years active: 1929–1982
- Labels: County records, Atteiram

Birch Monroe (May 16, 1901 – May 15, 1982) was an American old time and early bluegrass fiddler, bassist, dancer, founding member of the Monroe brothers, and older brother to Charlie and Bill Monroe. He grew up on a farm with five brothers and sisters before leaving it in the late twenties. Unlike brothers Charlie and Bill he chose to not pursue a career in music.

== Early days ==
Monroe was born near Rosine, in Western Kentucky. Like his five brothers and sisters he helped out on the six-hundred-and-fifty-five-acre property farm where their father made a living mining coal, cutting timber and farming.

Growing up with a mother that sang old-time songs and ballads, played harmonica, button accordion and fiddle and a father that was a dancer, folk traditions of home entertainment was part of the family life. Fiddle player, uncle Pen Vandiver, who Monroe has told that was a fine person «and never did get in a hurry over anything» also lived nearby. He frequently played at dances in the community. The siblings was involved with music and most of them played instruments and learned shape note singing through visiting teachers in the Baptist and Methodist churches of Rosine. Birch's main instrument was the fiddle.

== Leaving the farm ==
Monroe and his brother Charlie left the family farm in Rosine in the 1920s to work in the booming northern factories of the time. When Bill joined them in 1929 they were working in East Chicago, Indiana, at the Sinclair Oil refinery. There, the brothers played local venues and dances. Monroe, with his brothers played on WWAE in Hammond, Indiana and also performed weekly on WJKS in Gary. In 1932, the three, along with a friend, Larry Moore, were hired as exhibition square dancers for the national barn dance radio program, broadcast from Chicago. In 1934, Monroe chose the stability of working at the refinery to support his sisters while Charlie and Bill went on to perform on KFNF in Shenandoah, Iowa.

== Later performances ==
After the war, Monroe had a few performances with Bill. One of them include "Just a Little Talk with Jesus" at a 1948 performance in the Grand Ole Opry. Monroe played bass on tour with Bill after Howard Watts left the band. In late April 1963 he joined Bill Monroe for a performance with The Bluegrass Boys in Bean Blossom. Monroe was also manager, in the early 1960s, of Bill Monroe's country music park, the Brown County Jamboree, in Bean Blossom, Indiana. On July 3, 1969, at the Smithsonian Festival of American Culture, Monroe performed with Bill and Charlie. Birch can also be found on radio transcriptions that Charlie Monroe made in 1944 for the Noon-Day Jamboree released on County Records in 1974. In 1976 he performed at the Bean Blossom Bluegrass Festival.

== Death ==
Monroe died on May 15, 1982, the day before he would turn 81. The funeral was held at the Rosine Methodist Church in Rosine on Tuesday, May 18.

== Discography ==
=== Original Releases ===
Year of release	Title	Label	Number
1975	Brother Birch Monroe Plays Old Time Fiddle Favorites	Atteiram	API-L-1516

=== With Bill Monroe ===
==== Singles ====
Year of release	Title	Label	Number
1948	Summertime Is Past And Gone/Wicked Path Of Sin	Columbia	20503

*Sang bass on Wicked Path Of Sin

==== Compilations ====
Year of release	Title	Label	Number
1965	Original Bluegrass Sound	Harmony	HL 7338
1970	Sixteen All-Time Greatest Hits	Columbia	CS 1065
1978	Bill Monroe with Lester Flatt and Earl Scruggs "The Original Bluegrass Band"	Rounder	SS 06
1981	Bluegrass Classics Radio Shows 1946-1948	Bluegrass Classics	BGC 80
1984	Bill Monroe: Columbia Historic Edition	Columbia	FC 38904
1992	The Essential Bill Monroe and His Bluegrass Boys, 1945-1949	Columbia	C2K 52478
1994	The Music of Bill Monroe from 1936 to 1994	Decca	MCAD 4-11048
1998	Bill Monroe and His Bluegrass Boys: The Early Years	Vanguard	V 79518-2
2001	Bill Monroe & His Bluegrass Boys: Mansion for Me	Music Mill Entertainment	MME-71007
2002	Bill Monroe: Blue Moon of Kentucky 1936-1949	Bear Family	BCD 16399 FL

==== Live albums ====
Year of release	Title	Label	Number
1969	Festival of American Folklife, Vol. 1	Smithsonian Institution	FAF Vol. 1
1993	Bill Monroe and the Bluegrass Boys: Live Recordings 1956–1969, Off the Record Vol. 1	Smithsonian Folkways	SF CD 40063

=== With Charlie Monroe ===
Year of release	Title	Label	Number
1974	Charlie Monroe on the Noon-Day Jamboree - 1944	County Records	538
1974	The Songs Of Charlie Monroe And The Kentucky Pardners - 1944	County Records	539
1975	Charlie Monroe Live At Lake Norman Music Hall	Pine Tree Records	PTSLP-528

== Bibliography ==
- Rosenberg, Neil V. Bluegrass: a History. Urbana: University of Illinois Press, 2005. ISBN 978-0252072451
- Smith, Richard D. Can't You Hear Me Callin': the Life of Bill Monroe, Father of Bluegrass. Cambridge, MA: Da Capo Press, 2001. ISBN 978-0306810541
