= Cliff Carlisle =

American singer-songwriter

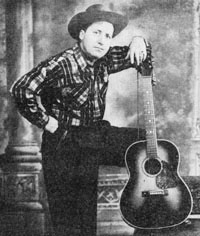

Background information
- Birth name: Clifford Carlisle
- Born: May 6, 1903
- Origin: Taylorsville, Kentucky, U.S.
- Died: April 5, 1983 (aged 79); Lexington, Kentucky
- Genres: Country
- Occupation: Singer
- Instrument: Steel guitar
- Years active: 1920s–1950s

Cliff Carlisle (May 6, 1903 – April 5, 1983) was an American country and blues musician, singer and songwriter. Carlisle was a yodeler and was a pioneer in the use of the Hawaiian steel guitar in country music. He was a brother of country music star Bill Carlisle.

== Biography ==
FootprintsInTheSnow

Carlisle was born in Taylorsville, Kentucky and began performing locally with cousin Lillian Truax at age 16. Truax's marriage put an end to the group, and Carlisle began playing with Wilber Ball, a guitarist and tenor harmonizer. The two toured frequently around the U.S. playing vaudeville and circus venues in the 1920s.

Cliff and Ball first played at Louisville, Kentucky radio station WHAS-AM in 1930, which made them local stars, and later that year they recorded for Gennett Records and Champion Records. In 1931, they recorded with Jimmie Rodgers. Toward the end of 1931, Carlisle signed with ARC and was offered performance slots on several radio stations, including WBT-AM in Charlotte, North Carolina, WLS-AM in Chicago and WLW-AM in Cincinnati, Ohio. Cliff's brother Bill Carlisle became his guitarist after Ball left in 1934. During the 1930s Carlisle, who recorded a large amount of material despite a hiatus from 1934 to 1936, frequently released songs with sexual connotations including barnyard metaphors (which became something of a hallmark).

Carlisle toured with his son, "Sonny Boy Tommy," to occasional consternation from authorities in areas where this contravened local child labor laws. He continued to perform on WMPS-AM in Memphis, Tennessee for several years in the 1940s, but by the 1950s had retired from music.

In the 1960s, The Rooftop Singers covered his tune "Tom Cat Blues"; in its wake, Carlisle and Ball did a few reunion shows together and recorded for Rem Records. On April 2, 1983, Carlisle died at the age of 79 in Lexington, Kentucky.

== Legacy ==
Carlisle's 1933 song "Goin' Down The Road Feelin' Bad" is featured in the 2017 video game Getting Over It with Bennett Foddy.

== Discography ==
Columbus Stockade Blues

=== Singles ===
Year	Title	Notes
Gennett Records
1930	My Carolina Sunshine Girl / Down In Jail On My Knees
1930	Desert Blues / Blue Yodel No.6	with Bill Carlisle
1930 (?)	I'm Lonely and Blue / I'm On My Way To Lonesome Valley
Champion Records
1930	Just A Lonely Hobo / Virginia Blues
1930	Crazy Blues / Hobo Blues	B-side with Bill Carlisle
1930	No Daddy Blues / Brakeman's Blues	Brakeman's Blues by Jimmie Rodgers
1931	Box Car Blues / The Brakeman's Reply	under the pseudonym J. Boone
1931	High Steppin' Mama / Alone and Lonesome
1931	Hobo Jack's Last Ride / The Written Letter	with Bill Carlisle as The Carlisle Brothers
1931	Nobody Wants Me / The Plea Of A Mother	with Bill Carlisle as The Carlisle Brothers
1931	Come Back Sweetheart / Memories That Haunt Me	with Bill Carlisle as The Carlisle Brothers
1931	She's Waiting For Me / The Cowboy's Song	with Bill Carlisle as The Carlisle Brothers
1931	The Fatal Run / Memories That Make Me Cry	with Bill Carlisle as The Carlisle Brothers
Conqueror Records
1931	Shanghai Rooster Yodel / Going Back To Alabama
1931	Memories That Make Me Cry / Dear Old Daddy
1931	Alone and Lonesome / Where Southern Roses Climb
1931	Box Car Yodel / Modern Mama
1931	Birmingham Jail No.2 / Just A Lonely Hobo
1931	The Written Letter / I Don't Mind
1931	My Rocky Mountain Sweetheart / Lonely Valley
1931	Guitar Blues / I Want A Good Woman
1932	Memories That Haunt Me / Seven Years With The Wrong Woman
1932 (?)	Childhood Dreams / Memories That Make Me Cry
1932	The Brakeman's Reply / Hobo Jack's Last Ride
1932	Roll In Blue Moon / When It's Roundup Time In Texas
1933	The Rustler's Fate / The Little Dobie Shack	with Bill Carlisle as The Carlisle Brothers
1933	Goin' Down The Road Feelin' Bad / Dang My Rowdy Soul
1933	Don't Marry The Wrong Woman / The Vacant Cabin Door
1933	Rambling Jack / Wreck Of Freight No. 52
1933	Blue Eyes / On The Banks Of The Rio Grande
1933	I'm Glad I'm A Hobo / Gambling Dan
1933	That Ramshackle Shack On The Hill / End Of Memory Lane	with Bill Carlisle as The Carlisle Brothers
1933	Looking For Tomorrow / Where Romance Calls
1933	Louisiana Blues / Fussin' Mama	A-side with Bill Carlisle
1933	I'm Traveling Live Along / Sunshine and Daisies
1934	Hen Pecked Man / Chicken Roost Blues
Montgomery Ward
1936	Rambling Yodeler / Cowboy Johnnie's Last Ride
1936	A Wild Cat Woman and A Tom Cat Man / Look Out, I'm Shifting Gears
1936	A Stretch Of 28 Years / My Lovin' Cathleen
1936	Handsome Blues / In A Box Car Around The World	B-side with Bill Carlisle
1936 (?)	When The Cactus Is In Bloom / My Lonely Boyhood Days	B-side under the pseudonym Lallaby Larkers
1936	You'll Miss Me When I'm Gone / When The Evening Sun Goes Down
1936	Flower Of The Valley / A Little White Rose	with Sonny Boy Tommy (Tommy Carlisle)
1936	I'm Saving Saturday Night For You / Waiting For A Ride
1936	It Takes An Old Hen To Deliver The Goods / When I Feel Froggie I'm Gonna Hop
1936	The Nasty Swing / It Ain't No Fault Of Mine
1937	Ridin' That Lonesome Trail / They Say It's The end Of The Trail
1937	There's A Lamp In The Window Tonight / New Memories Of You That Haunt Me
1937	Sweet As The Roses Of Spring / Just A Little Bit Of Loving From You
1937	Rocky Road / Pay Day Fight
1937	Cowboy's Dying Dream / Pan American Dream
1937	Waiting For A Ride / Your Saddle Is Empty Tonight
1937	When My Memory Lies / Lonely
1937	Rooster Blues / Troubled Minded Blues
1937	Blue Dreams / Hobo's Fate
Bluebird Records
1937	Pan American Man / ?
1937	Riding The Blinds / New Memories Of You That Haunt Me
1937	Your Saddle Is Empty Tonight / Cowboy's Dying Dream
1938	Why Did The Blue Sky Turn Gray / The Shack By The Side Of The Road
RCA Records
?	A Mean Mama Don't Worry Me / Why Did It Have To Be Me?
?	Devil's Train / Scars Upon My Heart
?	Death By The Roadside / You Just Wait and See
?	I Didn't Have Time / You Couldn't Be True If You Tried
?	You Can't Erase A Memory / All The World Is Lonely
Decca Records with Bill Carlisle
1938	Over By The Chrystal Sea / The Great Judgement Day
1938	Are You Going To Leave Me / The Girl I Left So Blues
1938	Wreck Of The Happy Valley / Weary Traveller with Sonny Boy Tommy
1938	Moonlight Blues / Big At The Little Bottom A
1938	Two Eyes In The Tennessee / Lonely Little Orphan Girl
1938	Trouble On My Mind / Nevada Johnnie
1938	No Drunkard Can Enter / I'm On My Way To The Promised Land
1938	When The Angels Carry Me Home / Home Of The Soul	with Sonny Boy Tommy
1938	No Letter In The Mail Today / Drifting
1938	I'm Just A Rambling Man / Blue Dreams
1938	My Old Home Place / Flower Of My Dream
1938	Where Are The Pals Of Long Ago / When We Meet Again
1938	I'm Heading For Some Home, Sweet Home / If Jesus Should Come
1938	Wabash Cannonball / Sparkling Blue Eyes	as Carlisle's Kentucky Boys
1939	Unclouded Sky / Far Beyond The Starry Sky
1939	Mouse Been Messin' Around / Ditty Wah Ditty
1939	Footprints In The Snow / My Little Sadie
1939	Roll On Old Troubles / I Dreamed I Searched Heaven
1939	Black Jack David / Makes No Differences What Live Will Bring	B-side as Carlisle Buckle Busters
1939	Sally Let Your Bangs Hang / Little Pal

=== Albums ===
- 1963: A Country Kind Of Songs and Hymns
- 1964: Maple On The Hill
- 1965: Cliff Carlisle
- 1965: Carlisle Family Album - Old Time Great Hymns (The Carlisle Family)
- 1965: Cliff Carlisle Vol. 1+2
