= David "Stringbean" Akeman =

American musician (1915–1973)

Background information
- Also known as: Stringbean
- Born: June 17, 1915; Annville, Kentucky, U.S.
- Died: November 10, 1973 (aged 58) Ridgetop, Tennessee, U.S.
- Genres: Old-time, bluegrass, country, comedy
- Occupations: Musician, comedian, baseball player
- Instruments: Banjo, vocals
- Years active: 1927–1973
- Website: davidakeman.com

David Akeman (June 17, 1915 – November 10, 1973), better known as Stringbean (or String Bean), was an American singer-songwriter, musician, comedian, and semiprofessional baseball player best known for his role as a main cast member on the hit television show Hee Haw and as a member of the Grand Ole Opry. Akeman was well known for his "old-fashioned" banjo-picking style, careful mix of comedy and music, and his memorable stage wardrobe (which consisted of a long nightshirt tucked into a pair of short blue jeans belted around his knees — giving him the comical appearance of a very tall man with stubby legs). Akeman and his wife were shot and murdered by burglars in their rural Tennessee home near Ridgetop, Tennessee, in 1973.

== Biography ==
=== Early life and career ===
Born in Annville, Akeman came from a musical family, including his father, James Akeman, who played the banjo at local dances. He got his first banjo when he was 12 years old in exchange for a pair of prize bantam chickens. Akeman began playing at local dances and gained a reputation as a musician, but the income was not enough to live on. He joined the Depression-era Civilian Conservation Corps, building roads and planting trees.

Eventually, he entered a talent contest judged by Asa Martin. He won and was invited to join Martin's band. During an early appearance, Martin forgot Akeman's name and introduced him as "String Bean" because of his tall, thin build. Akeman used the nickname the rest of his career.

Akeman originally was only a musician, but when another performer failed to show up one night, he was used as a singer and comic. From then, Akeman did both comedy and music. He appeared on WLAP-AM in Lexington, Kentucky, and played with several groups in the late 1930s.

Akeman also played semiprofessional baseball. As a ballplayer, he met bluegrass pioneer Bill Monroe, who fielded with another semipro team. From 1943 to 1945, Akeman played banjo for Monroe's band, performing on recordings such as "Goodbye Old Pal". He also teamed with Willie Egbert Westbrook as String Beans and Cousin Wilbur, a comedy duo who appeared on the same bill as Monroe's band. When he left Monroe, he was replaced by Earl Scruggs, a banjoist with a very different style.

In 1945, Akeman married Estell Stanfill. The same year, he formed a comedy duet with Willie Egbert Westbrook, and they were invited to perform on the Grand Ole Opry. The following year, Akeman began working with Grandpa Jones, another old-time banjo player and comedian. Jones and Akeman worked together at the Opry and many years later on the Hee Haw television series. They also became neighbors in Goodlettsville, Tennessee. Akeman became a protégé of Uncle Dave Macon, one of the biggest Opry stars. Near the end of his life, Macon gave Akeman one of his prized banjos.

=== Later years ===
Akeman, by now known only as Stringbean, was one of the Opry's major stars in the 1950s. He adopted a stage costume that accentuated his height—a shirt with an exceptionally long waist and tail, tucked into a pair of short blue jeans belted around his knees. The costume had many antecedents, including Slim Miller, a onetime stage comedian said to be Akeman's inspiration.

Akeman did not record as a solo artist until the early 1960s, when he was signed by the Starday label. Akeman remained a celebrated performer of the old-fashioned banjo playing, "clawhammer" or "frailing". In addition to his skill as a clawhammer player, Akeman also frequently played two-finger banjo, using thumb and forefinger. Akeman is listed with Uncle Dave Macon, Grandpa Jones, and Ralph Stanley as the greatest old-time style banjo pickers.

Akeman kept his audience with his traditional playing and his mixture of comedy and song. He scored country-chart hits with "Chewing Gum" and "I Wonder Where Wanda Went". Between 1962 and 1971, he recorded seven albums. The first, Old Time Pickin' and Grinnin' with Stringbean (1961), included folk songs (especially humorous animal songs), tall stories, and country jokes.

In 1969, Akeman and Grandpa Jones became cast members of a new television show entitled Hee Haw. One of his regular routines was reading a "letter from home" to his friends. Asked about the latest letter, Stringbean would take it out, saying he carried it "right next to my heart". Not finding it in his overalls pocket, he would check all of his other pockets by patting them with his hands until he found the letter, usually in his hip pocket. He was also the scarecrow in a cornfield who said one-liners before being shouted down by the crow on his shoulder. Following Akeman's death on November 10, 1973, Hee Haw continued airing Stringbean's taped segments, with his final episode on season five, episode 26, which was broadcast on March 23, 1974.

=== Murder ===
Akeman was modest and unassuming, and he enjoyed hunting and fishing. Accustomed to the hard times of the Great Depression, Akeman and his wife Estell lived frugally in a small cabin at 2308 Baker Road, near Ridgetop, Tennessee. Their only indulgences were a Cadillac and a color TV. Depression-era bank failures caused Akeman not to trust banks with his money. Gossip around Nashville was that Akeman kept large amounts of cash on hand, though he was by no means wealthy by entertainment industry standards.

On the night of November 10, 1973, Akeman and his wife were shot and killed after returning home from a performance at the Grand Ole Opry. The two killers had learned that the Akemans never kept their money in banks, preferring to hide it in their home, and Akeman always kept a large amount of cash on him. The killers listened to the live Opry broadcast on Akeman's radio so they would know when the couple would be returning home. The following morning, their bodies were discovered by their neighbor, musician Louis "Grandpa" Jones.

Billboard magazine, noting that Akeman had never learned to read or write, disclosed that his wife and he had a combined $5,700 ($41,340 in 2025) in cash on them when murdered and that their killers had left the crime scene in Akeman's own car. The killers, however, never found the Akeman's hidden money. In 1996, the new owner of Akeman's house discovered about $20,000 in cash stashed in the chimney behind a loose brick. Unfortunately, most of the money had been severely damaged by rodents and was unusable.

A police investigation resulted in the convictions of cousins John A. Brown and Marvin Douglas Brown, both 23 years old. They had ransacked the cabin and killed Akeman when he arrived. His wife shrieked when she saw her husband murdered. She begged for her life, but was shot, as well. According to the Tennessee Court of Criminal Appeals, "Upon their return, Mr. Akeman spotted the intruders in his home and evidently offered some resistance. One of the Brown cousins fatally shot Mr. Akeman, then pursued, shot, and killed Mrs. Akeman. At their trial (where Akeman's fellow cast member and friend Grandpa Jones testified, as he recognized one of the stolen firearms in the defendants' possession as a gift he had given Akeman), each defendant blamed the other for the homicides." The killers took only a chainsaw and some firearms.

Marvin Douglas Brown fought his convictions in the appellate courts. On September 28, 1982, the Tennessee Court of Criminal Appeals affirmed the trial judge's order denying him a new trial. Marvin Brown ultimately granted an exclusive interview to Larry Brinton of the Nashville Banner. He admitted his part in the burglary and murders, but insisted John Brown fired the fatal shots. As Marvin Brown, by his own admission, had committed burglary (a felony) that resulted in death, Brown was legally guilty of murder, regardless of who fired the shots, under Tennessee's felony murder rule.

Marvin Brown died of natural causes in 2003, at the Brushy Mountain State Penitentiary in Petros, Tennessee, and he is buried in the prison cemetery. John Brown was incarcerated in Lois M. DeBerry Special Needs Facility in Nashville. In July 2008, the Tennessee Parole Board deferred any parole for 36 months. He was again denied parole in July 2011. In 2014, John Brown was granted parole and released after serving 41 years of a 198-year sentence.

The A&E cable television network profiled the case on a 1999 episode of its City Confidential series.

David and Estelle Akeman are buried in Forest Lawn Memorial Gardens in Goodlettsville, Tennessee. During the remaining production of Hee Haw, the scarecrow was left as a memorial.

Bluegrass artist Sam Bush recorded "The Ballad of Stringbean and Estelle", which tells the story of their murders, for his 2009 album Circles Around Me. The song was written by Bush, Guy Clark, and Verlon Thompson, and it was nominated by the International Bluegrass Music Association for Song of the Year in 2011.
