= Rosine, Kentucky =

Unincorporated community in Kentucky, United States

Rosine
- Census-designated place
- Rosine
- Motto: Home of Bluegrass Music
- Location within the state of Kentucky Rosine (the United States)
- Coordinates: 37°27′01″N 86°44′29″W
- Country: United States
- State: Kentucky
- County: Ohio

Area
  - Total: 0.48 sq mi (1.25 km^{2})
  - Land: 0.48 sq mi (1.25 km^{2})
  - Water: 0 sq mi (0.00 km^{2})
- Elevation: 429 ft (131 m)

Population (2020)
  - Total: 110
  - Density: 228.3/sq mi (88.13/km^{2})
- Time zone: UTC-6 (Central (CST))
  - Summer (DST): UTC-5 (CST)
- ZIP codes: 42370
- Area code: 270
- FIPS code: 21-66846
- GNIS feature ID: 502356

Rosine (/roʊˈziːn/) is an unincorporated community in Ohio County, Kentucky, United States. As of the 2020 census, Rosine had a population of 110. Bill Monroe, The Father of Bluegrass, is buried in the Rosine Cemetery and memorialized with a bronze cast disk affixed to the barn where his music remains alive. The community was named for the pen name of Jennie Taylor McHenry, poet and wife of founder Henry D. McHenry. The ZIP Code is 42370 and the area code is 270. The nearest communities are Horse Branch, and Beaver Dam; and the nearest major cities are Owensboro and Bowling Green. The community sits at an elevation of 429 feet. At one time, Rosine was a thriving community with several stores, a school, a pickle factory, and a bat mill that milled bats for the Louisville Slugger bat factory.

== Demographics ==
Historical population
Census	Pop.	Note	%±
2020	110		—
U.S. Decennial Census

== Schools ==
There are no schools in Rosine, so students from Rosine attend Horse Branch Elementary School, Ohio County Middle School, and Ohio County High School. Nearby private schools include Sugar Grove Christian Academy and Ohio County Christian Academy. The nearest colleges and universities are in Owensboro.

== Major roads ==
U.S. Route 62 passes through Rosine. The town is north of the Western Kentucky Parkway and east of Interstate 165. The Louisville and Paducah railroad runs through the town.

== Bluegrass music ==
Each Friday night April - mid-December, musicians converge on the town of Rosine to play Bluegrass music. The musicians play in the small general store, outside the store and in a weekly stage show in the barn next to the store. An annual Bluegrass Festival is held in the town and another annual festival is held on the nearby Jerusalem Ridge where Monroe was born. Bill's musician brothers Birch Monroe and Charlie Monroe were also from Rosine.

As of May 2017 ground was broken for the building of the Bill Monroe museum and it opened in 2018. There is also the Bluemoon store located on Hwy 62E in Rosine.

== Notable buildings ==
- Rosine General Store and Barn, registered historic place
- Bill Monroe Museum, about early bluegrass music
