= Art Satherley =

Record producer and A&R

- Born: Arthur Edward Satherley; October 19, 1889; Bedminster, Bristol, England
- Died: February 10, 1986 (aged 96) Fountain Valley, California, US
- Occupation(s): Record producer, A&R
- Years active: 1923–1952
- Labels: Paramount, Columbia

Arthur Edward Satherley (October 19, 1889 – February 10, 1986) was an American record producer and A&R man. Often called Uncle Art Satherley, he made major contributions to the recording industry and has been described as "one of the most important pioneers in the field of country music production".

== Life and career ==
Satherley was born in Bedminster, Bristol, England, and in the 1911 Census was recorded as working as a clerk in a rubber business. He had a boyhood love of "cowboys and Indians", and traveled to the US in July 1913, settling in Wisconsin where he began work for a lumber company in Port Washington. He was then employed in the furniture business, for several years working for the Wisconsin Cabinet and Panel Company, which in 1918 began making phonographs. He also did secretarial work for Thomas Edison. Satherley's work involved him in the manufacture of shellac discs, and he became responsible for marketing records for the Paramount company, selling discs by blues singers including Ma Rainey, Blind Lemon Jefferson and Blind Blake, initially at county fairs and other events, and then through advertising in regional newspapers.

By 1923, Satherley started supervising Paramount recording sessions, working with Rainey, Jefferson and others and developing a reputation as a talent scout. After a short time with QRS, a piano roll manufacturer, he joined the American Record Corporation in 1929, where he made the first commercial recordings of Lead Belly. When Columbia Records bought ARC in 1938 he became head of their country and blues A&R departments. Among those he produced were country stars Gene Autry – for whom he helped secure his first film work – the Carter Family, Vernon Dalhart, Bob Wills, Lefty Frizzell, Marty Robbins and Roy Acuff, and many blues musicians including Alberta Hunter, Big Bill Broonzy, Josh White, Leroy Carr and Memphis Minnie.

Satherley retired from Columbia in 1952, only undertaking occasional production work thereafter. He was elected to the Country Music Hall of Fame in 1971, the first non-American citizen to be so honored. He died in Fountain Valley, California in 1986.

In 2011, following many years campaigning, a Blue Plaque was unveiled close to his birthplace in Bristol. The ceremony was filmed and formed part of a short documentary broadcast by BBC Television on February 7, 2011, three days before the 25th anniversary of his death.
