= Harmony Records =

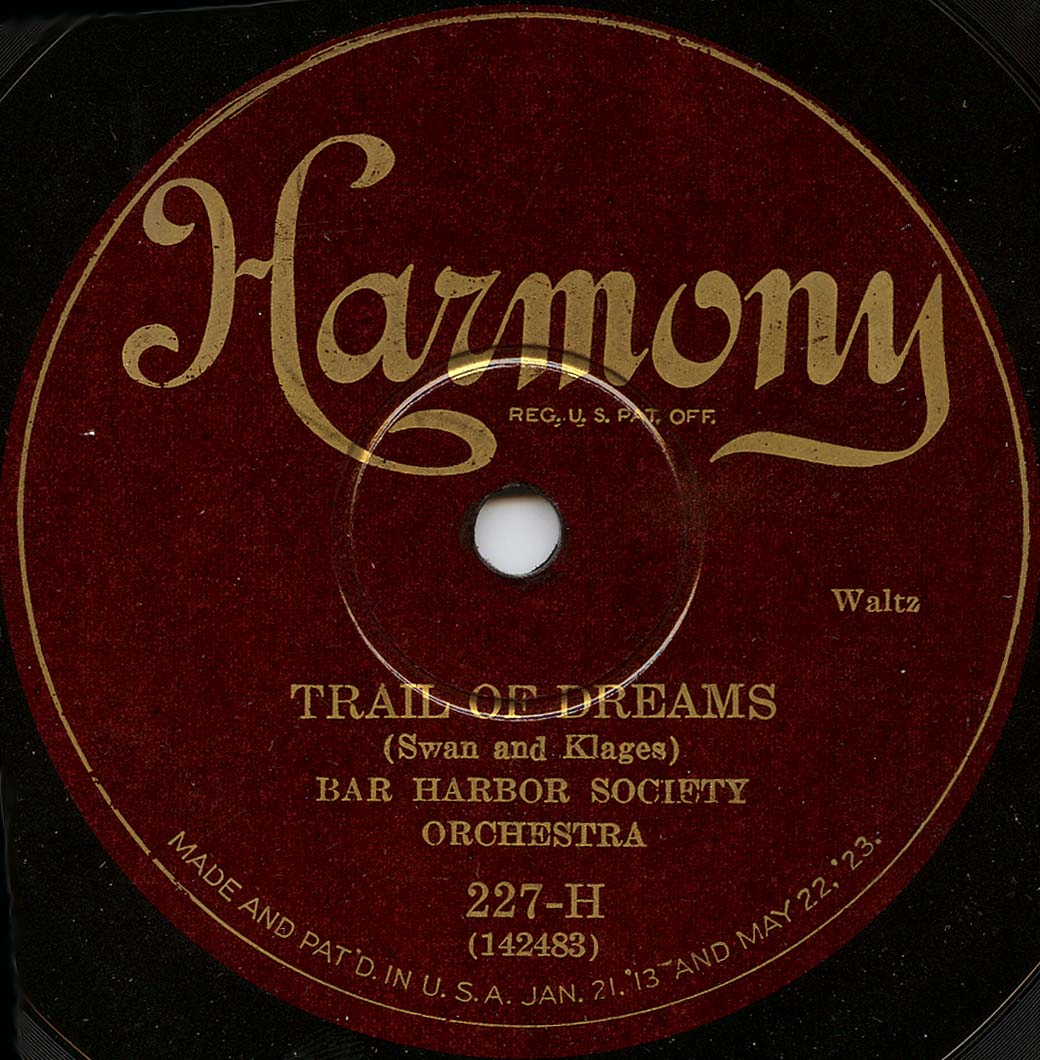
- This 1926 disc featured "Trail of Dreams" by Einar Aaron Swan. The label kept its basic design until 1932 when the red background was brightened.
- Parent company: Columbia Records
- Founded: 1925
- Status: Defunct
- Genre: Jazz, country, popular
- Country of origin: U.S.

Harmony Records was a record label owned by Columbia Records that debuted in 1925.

== History ==
Harmony Records began for low-priced 78 rpm records in the 1920s and 1930s. It was revived for budget albums of reissued tracks in 1957. The revived label was most active during the 1960s, and Columbia continued to issue repackages on the label into the mid-1970s.

Harmony's records were acoustically recorded until 1929, although electrical recording dominated the industry. Columbia redesigned its acoustic recording process before electrical recording became popular, creating a unique Harmony sound that stood apart from other acoustic recordings.

In 1931 and 1932, Columbia instituted a couple of short-lived series, a handful of double tracked records, and another series of longer-playing records.

Grigsby-Grunow, the company that bought Columbia, discontinued Harmony, Velvet Tone Records, and Clarion Records.

In 1957 Columbia revived the Harmony label for its budget album line. These albums consisted of older material recorded by current or former Columbia recording artists. The albums sold for between $1.99 and 2.99. By the late-1960s these bargain-priced discs proved to be so popular Columbia actually acquired the rights to some recordings from ABC, Warner Bros., and Reprise to keep up with the demand for more releases. The final new compilations on Harmony were issued in 1974 but a number of titles remained in print until 1979. Virtually every major recording artist who was ever under Columbia had at some point had at least one Harmony compilation. Among the most popular artists for Harmony compilations were Doris Day, Frank Sinatra, The Carter Family, Roy Acuff, Tony Bennett, The Everly Brothers, Dinah Shore, Aretha Franklin, Judy Garland, Johnny Cash, Lynn Anderson, Johnny Mathis, and Billie Holiday.
