= Blue Moon of Kentucky =

1947 single by Bill Monroe

Single by Bill Monroe and his Blue Grass Boys
- Released: September 1947
- Genre: Bluegrass
- Label: Columbia
- Songwriter: Bill Monroe

"Blue Moon of Kentucky" is a waltz written in 1945 by bluegrass musician Bill Monroe and recorded by his band, the Blue Grass Boys. Some think the origins may trace back to "Roll Along, Kentucky Moon", a similar waltz recorded 15 years prior by Jimmie Rodgers. The song has since been recorded by many artists, including Elvis Presley and Paul McCartney. The song is the official bluegrass song of Kentucky.

In 2002, Monroe's version was one of 50 recordings chosen that year by the Library of Congress to be added to the National Recording Registry. In 2003, CMT ranked "Blue Moon" number 11 in its list of 100 Greatest Songs in Country Music.

== Bill Monroe version ==
Monroe's earliest-known performance of "Blue Moon of Kentucky" was on the Grand Ole Opry broadcast of August 25, 1945. He first recorded it for Columbia Records on September 16, 1946, at The Wrigley Building in Chicago, Illinois. That recording was released in early 1947. At the time, the Bluegrass Boys included vocalist and guitarist Lester Flatt and banjoist Earl Scruggs, who later formed their own bluegrass band, the Foggy Mountain Boys. Both Flatt and Scruggs performed on the recording, although Bill Monroe supplied the vocals on this song. The song, described as a "bluegrass waltz", had become a United States wide hit by 1947 and also became enormously popular with other bluegrass, country, and early rockabilly acts. The song was revered at the Grand Ole Opry; Carl Perkins played an uptempo version of this song in his early live performances.

After Presley's more rock-oriented version became popular, Monroe tweaked the Blue Grass Boys’ arrangement of it, starting it slowly, playing one round, and then jumping into a 4/4 time signature, as Presley had done, turning it into a barn-burning bluegrass classic".

== Elvis Presley version ==
"Blue Moon of Kentucky"
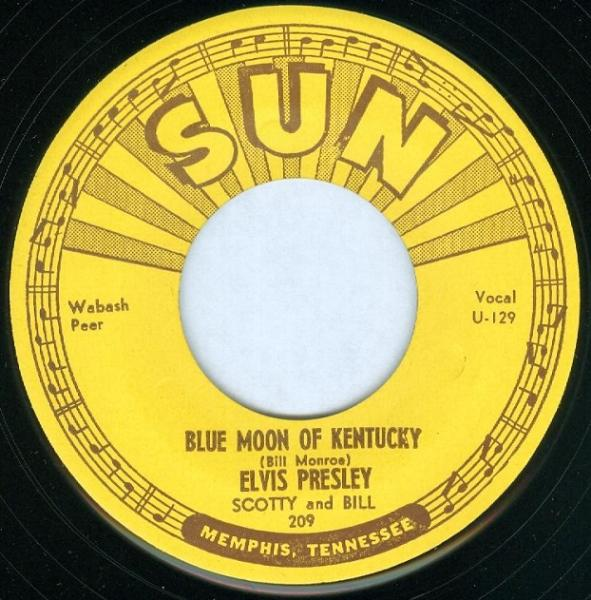

Single by Elvis Presley
- A-side: "That's All Right"
- Released: July 19, 1954
- Recorded: July 7, 1954
- Genre: Rockabilly, country
- Length: 1:57
- Label: Sun (original); RCA Victor (reissue)
- Songwriter: Bill Monroe
- Producer: Sam Phillips

Elvis Presley singles chronology
"Blue Moon of Kentucky" (1954)	"Good Rockin' Tonight" (1955)

The search for another song to release along with "That's All Right" at Sun Records in July 1954 led to "Blue Moon of Kentucky" via Bill Black. Presley's version turned "it from a waltz to a bluesy rocker".

According to Scotty Moore:

We all of us knew we needed something...and things seemed hopeless after a while. Bill is the one who came up with "Blue Moon of Kentucky"...We're taking a little break and he starts beating on the bass and singing "Blue Moon of Kentucky", mocking Bill Monroe, singing the high falsetto voice. Elvis joins in with him, starts playing and singing along with him.

— The Blue Moon Boys - The Story of Elvis Presley's Band

Presley, Moore, and Black, with the encouragement of Sam Phillips, transformed Monroe's slow waltz, in 3/4 time, into an upbeat, blues-flavored tune in 4/4 time. After an early rendition of the song, Sun Records owner Sam Phillips exclaimed, "BOY, that's fine, that's fine. That's a POP song now!" As with all of the Presley records issued by Sun, the artists were listed and stylized as "ELVIS PRESLEY SCOTTY and BILL".

The same night that Dewey Phillips first played the flip side of this first release of Presley's music on WHBQ, "That's All Right", Sleepy Eye John at WHHM loosed "Blue Moon of Kentucky". Bob Neal of WMPS played the record, too. The pop jockeys, entranced by something new, began slipping "That's All Right" and "Blue Moon of Kentucky" in among the easy-listening pop of Teresa Brewer, Nat Cole, Tony Bennett, and others.

With Presley's version of Monroe's song consistently rated higher, both sides began to chart across the Southern United States. Billboard has the song listed only in Memphis, and as number six with "That's All Right" at number 7 on October 9 in the C&W Territorial Best Sellers. By October 23, "Blue Moon" was in the top 10 in Memphis, Nashville, and New Orleans, with "That's All Right" absent from the listings.

Fellow Sun Records artist Charlie Feathers has often claimed that he came up with the arrangement of the song used by Presley. While others sources claimed that it was Presley who arranged the song. Monroe, at first, did not care for Presley's version until "powerful checks" (in sizeable amounts) began rolling in for Monroe's writing credit.

The song was later included in the 1959 compilation album A Date with Elvis. It was also used in a scene of the 2005 TV miniseries Elvis.

=== Personnel ===
- Elvis Presley – lead vocals, acoustic rhythm guitar
- Scotty Moore – electric lead guitar
- Bill Black – double bass

== Other recordings ==
In 1954, the Stanley Brothers recorded a version of the song using Presley's 4/4 arrangement with bluegrass instrumentation, neatly bridging the stylistic gap between Monroe and Presley's approaches. Bill Monroe subsequently re-recorded and performed the song using a mixture of the two styles, starting the song in its original 3/4 time arrangement, then launching into an uptempo 4/4 rendition.

Patsy Cline recorded "Blue Moon" in 1963. Cline's vocals were overdubbed over a different arrangement for the soundtrack to Cline's bio movie Sweet Dreams.

In 1968, Al Kooper recorded a version for his debut solo album, I Stand Alone.

The Beatles did not release a version of the song, but a recording does exist of the song being performed in an impromptu jam by the then-remaining Beatles Paul McCartney, George Harrison, and Ringo Starr during the Anthology sessions in 1994, but before that happened, Paul McCartney recorded his own version for Unplugged (The Official Bootleg) which was a combination of both the Bill Monroe and Elvis Presley versions in 1991.
