= Mac Wiseman =

American bluegrass and country singer (1925–2019)

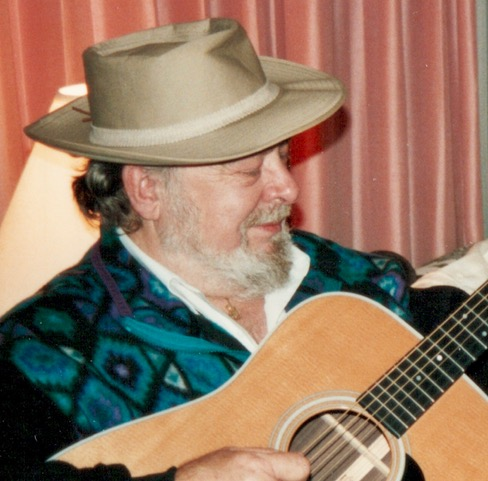
- Mac Wiseman, ca.1990

Background information
- Born: Malcolm Bell Wiseman; May 23, 1925; Crimora, Virginia, U.S.
- Died: February 24, 2019 (aged 93) Nashville, Tennessee, U.S.
- Genres: Bluegrass; country
- Occupations: Singer; musician
- Instruments: Vocals; guitar
- Years active: 1944–2019
- Labels: Dot, Capitol, RCA, Sugar Hill, CMH, Oh Boy, Rural Rhythm, Mountain Fever
- Formerly of: The GrooveGrass Boyz

Malcolm Bell "Mac" Wiseman (May 23, 1925 – February 24, 2019) was an American bluegrass and country singer active for seven decades in the twentieth century. He was part of Bluegrass music's earliest generation, though bluegrass never defined him. He helped found the CMA, headed Dot Records' country division, and, in 1993, he was inducted into the International Bluegrass Music Hall of Honor. In his early career he was the guitarist for Flatt and Scruggs' band, the Foggy Mountain Boys. His biggest hits included "The Ballad of Davy Crockett" (1955) and "Jimmy Brown the Newsboy" (1959). (Note: The song, originally titled "Jimmie Brown, the Newsboy," was composed in 1875 by William S. Hays. This spelling "Jimmie" was retained when The Carter Family recorded their version in 1931. However, subsequent renditions by artists such as Flatt & Scruggs and Mac Wiseman used the spelling "Jimmy Brown, the Newsboy." Therefore, both "Jimmie" and "Jimmy" have been used in the song's title over time.) Wiseman was a recipient of a 2008 National Heritage Fellowship awarded by the National Endowment for the Arts, which is the United States' highest honor in the folk and traditional arts. In 2014 he became part of the Veteran Era category of the Country Music Hall of Fame, as "an artist who achieved national prominence more than 45 years ago".

== Early life ==
He was born on May 23, 1925, in Crimora, Virginia. He attended school in New Hope, Virginia, and graduated from high school there in 1943. He had polio from the age of six months; due to his disabilities, he could not do field work and spent his time in childhood listening to old records. He studied at the Shenandoah Conservatory in Dayton, Virginia, before it moved to Winchester, Virginia, in 1960 and started his career as a disc jockey at WSVA-AM in Harrisonburg, Virginia.

== Music career ==
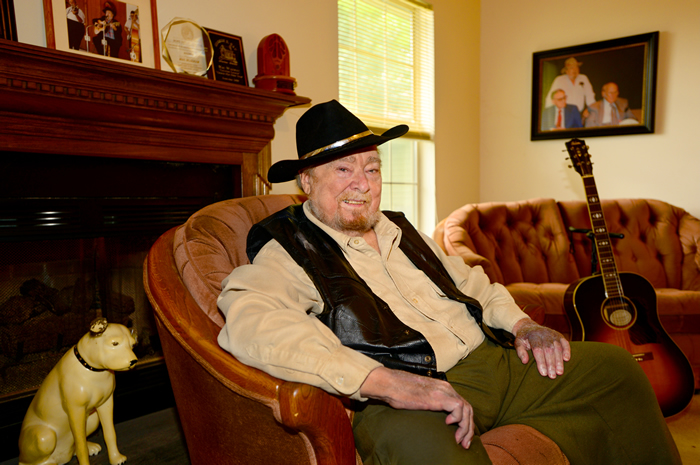
Wiseman in 2008

His musical career began as upright bass player in the Cumberland Mountain Folks, the band of country singer Molly O'Day. When Lester Flatt and Earl Scruggs left Bill Monroe's band, Wiseman became the guitarist for their new band, the Foggy Mountain Boys. Later he played with Bill Monroe's Bluegrass Boys.

In 1951, his first solo single, "'Tis Sweet to Be Remembered", was released. According to Rolling Stone this song "catapulted him to solo stardom". In 1958, he helped co-found the Country Music Association (CMA) to save the popularity of country music from rock & roll, and served as the organization's first secretary, eventually becoming its last living co-founder. From 1966 to 1970, Wiseman served as director of the WWVA Jamboree.

In 1986, Wiseman co-founded the International Bluegrass Music Association (IBMA) which was another influential bluegrass music body. He was referred to by a disc jockey as "The Voice with a Heart", a title which became popular among his fans. He was popular for his interpretations of songs on Dot Records such as "Shackles and Chains", "I'll Be All Smiles Tonight", "Jimmy Brown the Newsboy", and "Love Letters in the Sand".

In 2014, he released an album of songs inspired by his mother's handwritten notebooks of songs she heard on the radio when Wiseman was a child: Songs From My Mother's Hand.

== Death ==
Wiseman died in Nashville, Tennessee on February 24, 2019, at the age of 93 from kidney failure.

Mac Wiseman recorded splendid and often groundbreaking music for more than seventy years, remaining relevant and productive even in his nineties. He was a titan of bluegrass music's first generation, though bluegrass never defined him. He helped found the CMA, he headed Dot Records' country division, and he recorded with everyone from big band legend Woody Herman to Rock and Roll Hall of Famer Duane Eddy to Americana poet laureate John Prine.

— Kyle Young, CEO, Country Music Hall of Fame and Museum,

== Awards and honors ==
In 1993 he was inducted into the International Bluegrass Music Hall of Honor. Wiseman was a recipient of a 2008 National Heritage Fellowship awarded by the National Endowment for the Arts, which is the United States' highest honor in the folk and traditional arts. In 2014 he became part of the Veteran Era category of the Country Music Hall of Fame, as "an artist who achieved national prominence more than 45 years ago".

== Selected discography ==
=== Albums ===
Year	Title	Label	Number	Notes
1957	Tis Sweet To Be Remembered	Dot	DLP-3084/25084	Dot mono = 3xxx, stereo = 25xxx
1959	Great Folk Ballads	Dot Records	DLP-3213	Mono
1959	Beside The Still Waters	Dot Records	DLP-3135	Mono
1960	Keep On The Sunny Side	Dot Records	DLP-3336	Mono
1960	Mac Wiseman Sings 12 Great Hits	Dot Records	DLP-3313	Mono
1961	Best-Loved Gospel Hymns	Dot Records	DLP-3373	Mono
1962	Fire Ball Mail And Other Favorites	Dot Records	DLP-3408	Mono
1962	Bluegrass Favorites	Capitol Records	T-1800	Mono
2014	Songs From My Mother's Hand	Wrinkled Records	WR-8336	Inspired by his mother's handwritten notebooks of popular songs from his childhood
2017	I Sang the Songs	Mountain Fever		Songs based on stories related in Wiseman's recent autobiography

=== Notable singles ===
Year	Single	Peak positions		Album
Year	Single	US Country	CAN Country	Album
1955	"The Ballad of Davy Crockett"	10	—	Non-album single
1959	"Jimmy Brown the Newsboy"	5	—	Great Folk Ballads
1963	"Your Best Friend and Me"	12	—	Non-album single
1968	"Got Leavin' On Her Mind"	54	—	Non-album single
1969	"Johnny's Cash and Charley's Pride"	38	30	Sings Johnny's Cash and Charley's Pride
1978	"Never Going Back Again"	78	—	Non-album single
1979	"My Blue Heaven" (with Woody Herman)	69	—	Non-album single
1979	"Scotch and Soda"	88	—	Non-album single
1979	"Shackles and Chains" (with Osborne Brothers)	95	—	The Essential Bluegrass Album
"—" denotes releases that did not chart
