= Rudy Lyle =

American bluegrass banjo player

Rudy R. Lyle (March 17, 1930 – February 11, 1985) was an American bluegrass banjo player, mostly known for being a member of Bill Monroe's Blue Grass Boys in the period 1949–1954.

== Biography ==
Lyle was born in Franklin County, Virginia. His grandfather, Lomax Blankenship, was a well-known fiddler who used to play at local dances. When Lyle was young he was taught to play the banjo by Lawrence Wright, a banjoist who hailed from Rocky Mount, Virginia. In his teens, he joined "Uncle Joe Johnson's band" and appeared on WPAQ radio in Mount Airy, North Carolina. In the summer of 1949, Lyle met Bill Monroe when he came to Mount Airy for a personal appearance. Monroe was in need of a banjo player, since Don Reno had left earlier, but didn't want to hire Lyle immediately since he didn't want to take him away from Uncle Joe. Anyhow, three weeks later, Lyle was hired by Monroe, went to Nashville and joined the Blue Grass Boys. The first show he played with Monroe in the Ryman Auditorium was the RC Cola Show. The band consisted of Monroe, Lyle, Mac Wiseman, Chubby Wise, and Jack Thompson. He continued to work with Monroe until the summer of 1951. He was replaced by James Bowers and later by Sonny Osborne. In 1953, Lyle returned to the Blue Grass Boys, but left again the next year. Lyle recorded a total of 31 songs for Bill Monroe. In 1954, he worked with Jimmy Dean and later also with artists such as Roy Clark, Claude King, Patsy Cline, Cas Walker and Red Rector. Lyle was a private pilot and often flew own-built planes. He died in 1985 at age 54.

== Sources ==
- Goldsmith, Thomas (2004), The Bluegrass Reader, University of Illinois Press
- Rosenberg, Neil V., Wolfe, Charles K. (1989) "Bluegrass, Bill Monroe", Bear Family Records Publ.
