= Lester Flatt =

American singer-songwriter (1914–1979)

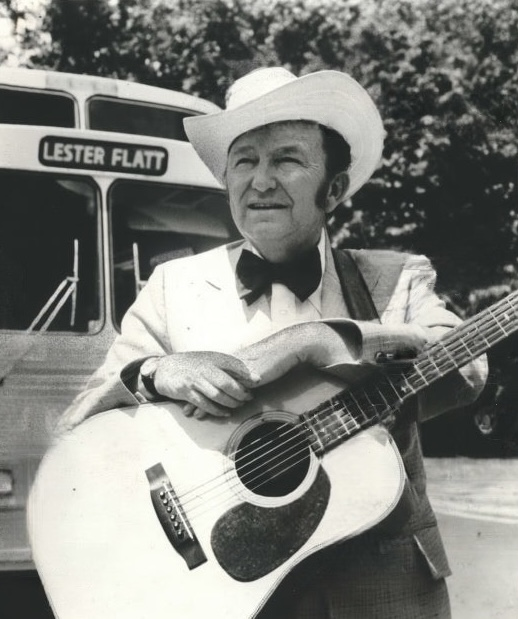
- Flatt in 1979

Background information
- Born: Lester Raymond Flatt; June 19, 1914; Overton County, Tennessee, U.S.
- Died: May 11, 1979 (aged 64) Nashville, Tennessee, U.S.
- Genres: Bluegrass, country
- Occupations: Musician, songwriter
- Instruments: Guitar, vocals, mandolin
- Years active: 1940–1979
- Formerly of: Flatt and Scruggs, Nashville Grass

Lester Raymond Flatt (June 19, 1914 – May 11, 1979) was an American singer, bluegrass guitarist, and mandolinist, best known for his collaboration with banjo picker Earl Scruggs in the duo Flatt and Scruggs.

Flatt's career spanned multiple decades, breaking out as a member of Bill Monroe's band during the 1940s and including multiple solo and collaboration works exclusive of Scruggs. He first reached a mainstream audience through his performance on "The Ballad of Jed Clampett", the theme for the network television series The Beverly Hillbillies, in the early 1960s.

== Biography ==
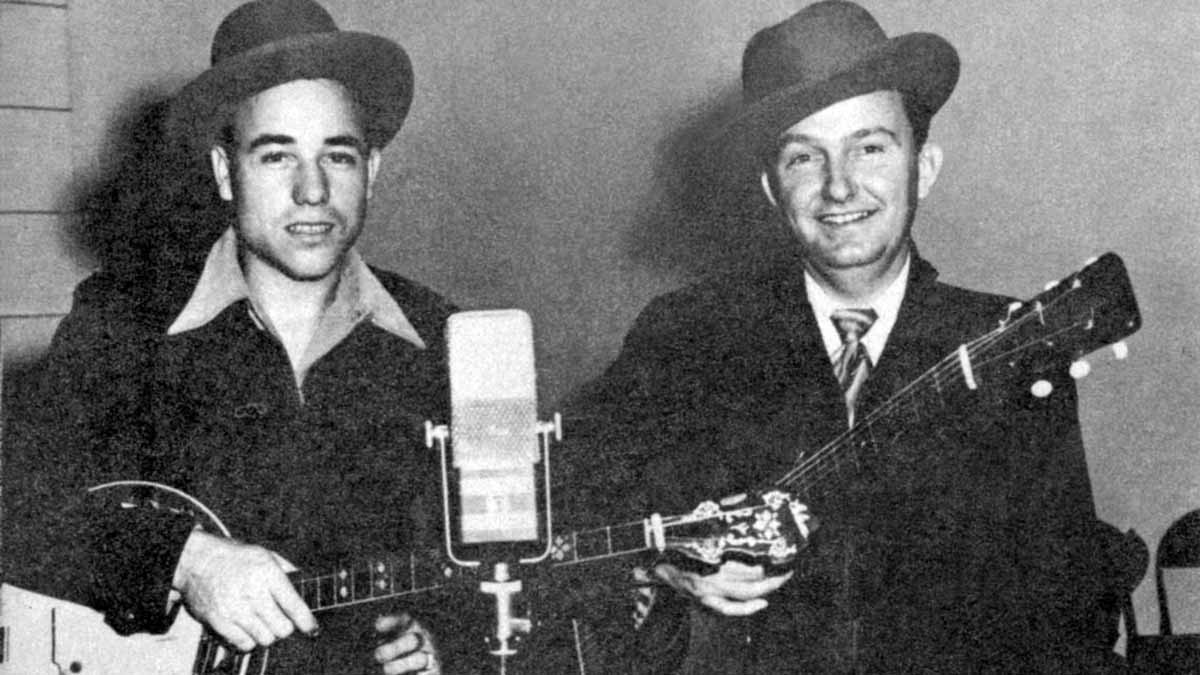
Flatt (right) with Earl Scruggs (left) as part of Flatt and Scruggs in 1949

Flatt was born in Duncan's Chapel, Overton County, Tennessee, United States, to Nannie Mae Haney and Isaac Columbus Flatt. In 1943, he played mandolin and sang tenor in The Kentucky Pardners, the band of Bill Monroe's older brother Charlie. He first came to prominence as a member of Bill Monroe's Blue Grass Boys in 1945 and played a thumb-and-index guitar style that was in part derived from the playing of Charlie Monroe and Clyde Moody. In 1948, he started a band with fellow Monroe alumnus Earl Scruggs, and for the next 20 years, Flatt and Scruggs and the Foggy Mountain Boys were one of the most successful bands in bluegrass. When they parted ways in 1969, Flatt formed a new group, the Nashville Grass, hiring many of the Foggy Mountain Boys. He continued to record and perform with that group until his death in 1979. His role as rhythm guitarist and vocalist in each of these seminal ensembles helped define the sound of traditional bluegrass music. His solid guitar playing and rich lead voice are unmistakable in hundreds of bluegrass standards. He is also remembered for his library of compositions.

== Death and legacy ==
Flatt died of heart failure in Nashville, Tennessee, at the age of 64.

He was posthumously inducted into the Country Music Hall of Fame in 1985 along with Scruggs. Flatt was also posthumously inducted as an inaugural member of the International Bluegrass Music Hall of Honor in 1991.

Lester's hometown of Sparta, Tennessee, held a bluegrass festival in his honor for a number of years, before being discontinued a few years prior to the death of the traditional host, resident Everette Paul England; Lester Flatt Memorial Bluegrass Day remains part of the annual Liberty Square Celebration held in Sparta.

Flatt and Scruggs were ranked No. 24 on CMT's 40 Greatest Men of Country Music in 2003. In 2027, Flatt was inducted into the Volunteer State Music Hall of Fame.

== Discography ==
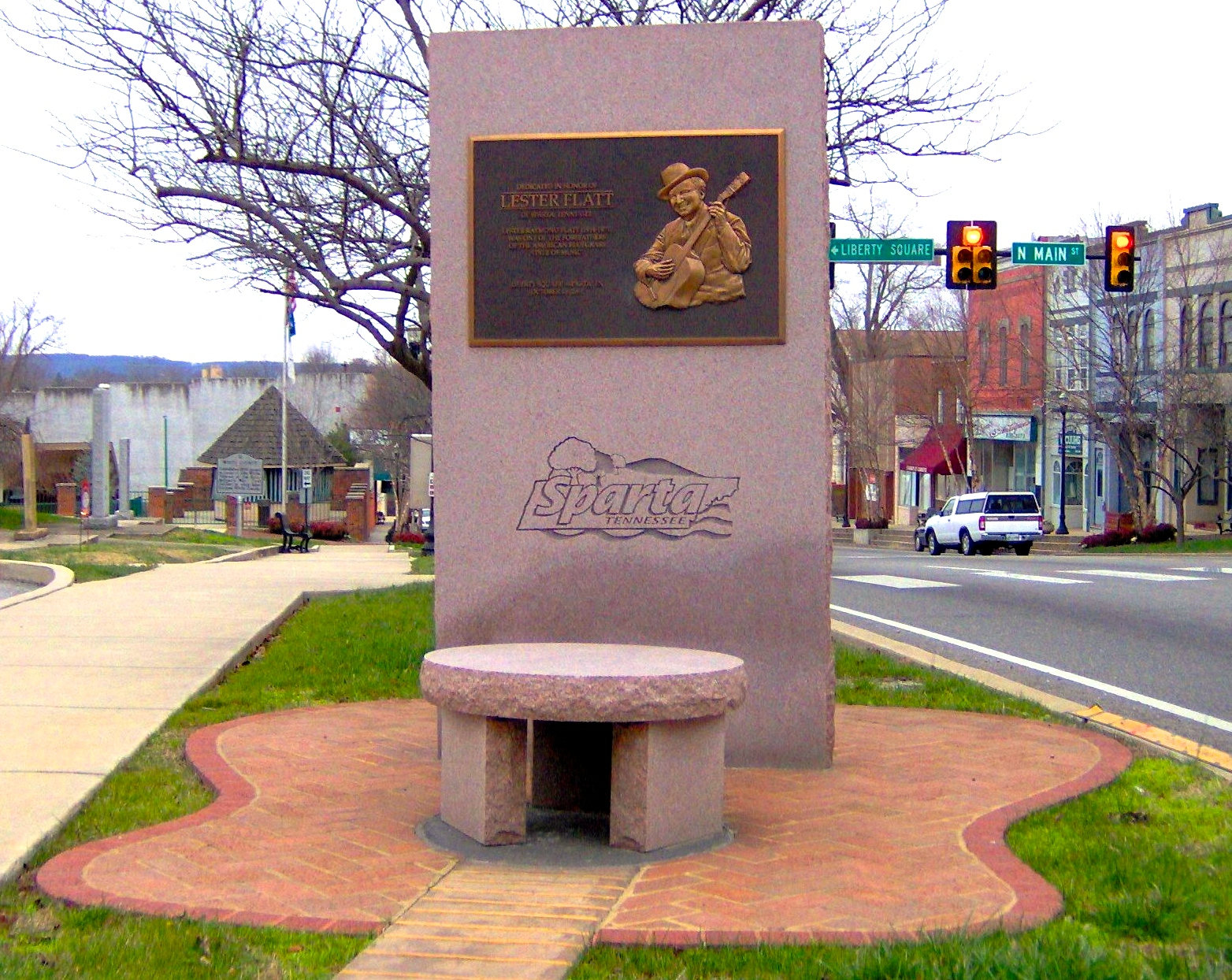
Lester Flatt memorial in Sparta, Tennessee

Year	Album	US Country	Label
1970	Flatt Out		Columbia
1970	One and Only		Nugget
1971	Flatt on Victor		RCA Victor
1971	Lester 'N' Mac (w/ Mac Wiseman)	42	RCA Victor
1972	Kentucky Ridgerunner		RCA Victor
1972	On the Southbound (w/ Mac Wiseman)		RCA Victor
1972	Foggy Mountain Breakdown		RCA Victor
1973	Country Boy	45	RCA Victor
1973	Over the Hills to the Poorhouse (w/ Mac Wiseman)		RCA Victor
1974	Before You Go		RCA Victor
1974	Live Bluegrass Festival (w/ Bill Monroe)		RCA Victor
1974	The Best		RCA Victor
1975	Flatt Gospel (w/ Nashville Grass)		Canaan Records
1976	Lester Raymond Flatt		Flying Fish
1976	Heaven's Bluegrass Band (w/ Nashville Grass)		CMH Records
1976	A Living Legend (w/ Nashville Grass)		CMH Records
1978	Pickin' Time (w/ Nashville Grass)		CMH Records
1979	Fantastic Pickin' (w/ Nashville Grass)		CMH Records
