= Rhonda Vincent discography =

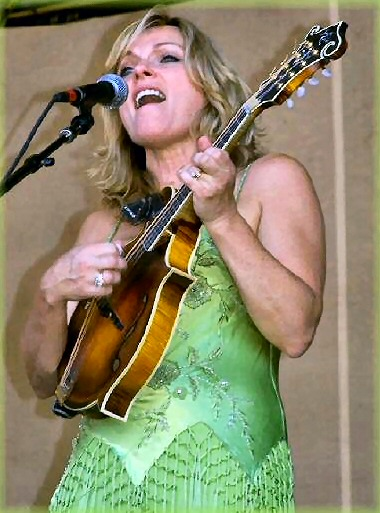
- Studio albums: 20
- Compilation albums: 1
- Singles: 15
- Music videos: 10

The discography of Rhonda Vincent, an American bluegrass artist, consists of eighteen studio albums and fifteen singles.

== Studio albums ==
=== 1980s–1990s ===
Title	Details
New Dreams and Sunshine	Release date: December 1988; Label: Rebel Records; Formats: LP, CD, cassette
A Dream Come True	Release date: September 24, 1990; Label: Rebel Records; Formats: CD, cassette
Timeless and True Love	Release date: October 22, 1991; Label: Rebel Records; Formats: CD, cassette
Written in the Stars	Release date: October 12, 1993; Label: Giant Records; Formats: CD, cassette
Trouble Free	Release date: January 16, 1996; Label: Giant Records; Formats: CD, cassette

=== 2000s ===
Title	Details	Peak chart positions		
Title	Details	US Grass	US Country	US Heat
Back Home Again	Release date: January 11, 2000; Label: Rounder Records; Formats: CD, cassette	—	—	—
The Storm Still Rages	Release date: June 5, 2001; Label: Rounder Records; Formats: CD, cassette	9	59	—
One Step Ahead	Release date: April 29, 2003; Label: Rounder Records; Formats: CD, cassette	2	30	19
All American Bluegrass Girl	Release date: May 23, 2006; Label: Rounder Records; Formats: CD, music download	1	43	14
Beautiful Star: A Christmas Collection	Release date: 2006; Label: Rounder Records; Formats: CD, music download	—	—	—
Good Thing Going	Release date: January 8, 2008; Label: Rounder Records; Formats: CD, music download	1	35	5
Destination Life	Release date: June 16, 2009; Label: Rounder Records; Formats: CD, music download	2	52	21
"—" denotes releases that did not chart

=== 2010s ===
Title	Details	Peak chart positions					
Title	Details	US Grass	US Country	US	US Heat	US Indie	US Christ
Taken	Release date: September 21, 2010; Label: Upper Management; Formats: CD, music download	1	21	131	3	19	—
Only Me	Release date: January 28, 2014; Label: Upper Management; Formats: CD, music download	1	36	—	10	—	—
Christmas Time	Release date: October 30, 2015; Label: Upper Management; Formats: CD, music download	2	26	–	2	26	21
"—" denotes releases that did not chart

=== 2020s ===
Title	Details	Peak chart positions
Title	Details	US Bluegrass
Music Is What I See	Release date: May 29, 2021; Label: Upper Management; Formats: CD, music download	5
Destinations and Fun Places	Release date: August 9, 2024; Label: Upper Management; Formats: CD, music download	4
"—" denotes releases that did not chart

== Collaboration albums ==
Title	Details	Peak chart positions		Sales
Title	Details	US Grass	US Country	Sales
Bound for Gloryland (with The Sally Mountain Show)	Release date: July 20, 1991; Label: Rebel Records; Formats: CD, cassette	—	—	
Your Money and My Good Looks (with Gene Watson)	Release date: June 7, 2011; Label: Upper Management; Formats: CD, music download	—	56	
American Grandstand (with Daryle Singletary)	Release date: July 7, 2017; Label: Upper Management; Formats: CD, music download	1	45	US: 10,900

== Live albums ==
Title	Details	Peak chart positions					
Title	Details	US Grass	US Country	US Americana	US Heat	US Christ	US Folk
Ragin' Live	Release date: March 8, 2005; Label: Rounder Records; Formats: CD, music download	2	55	—	—	—	—
Sunday Mornin' Singin' Live	Release date: July 10, 2012; Label: Upper Management; Formats: CD, music download	1	37	—	10	19	11
All the Rage	Release date: November 11, 2016; Label: Upper Management; Formats: CD, music download	1	—	17	—	—	—
Live at the Ryman (with Mac Wiseman, The Osborne Brothers and Jesse McReynolds)	Release date: July 13, 2018; Label: Upper Management; Formats: CD, music download	2	—	—	—	—	—

== Compilation albums ==
Title	Details
My Blue Tears	Release date: September 24, 2002; Label: Rebel Records; Formats: CD, cassette

== Singles ==
Single	Year	Peak positions	Album
Single	Year	US Country	Album
"I'm Not Over You"	1993	—	Written in the Stars
"What Else Could I Do"	1994	—	Written in the Stars
"What More Do You Want from Me"	1995	—	Trouble Free
"I Sang Dixie"	1998	—	Will Sing for Food: The Songs of Dwight Yoakam
"My Sweet Love Ain't Around"	2001	—	The Storm Still Rages
"Don't Lie"	2001	—	The Storm Still Rages
"I'm Not Over You" (re-recording)	2002	—	The Storm Still Rages
"You Can't Take It With You When You Go"	2003	58	One Step Ahead
"If Heartaches Had Wings"	2004	48	One Step Ahead
"I've Forgotten You"	2005	59	Ragin' Live
"Heartbreaker's Alibi" (with Dolly Parton)	2006	—	All American Bluegrass Girl
"All American Bluegrass Girl"	2006	—	All American Bluegrass Girl
"I'm Leavin'"	2008	—	Good Thing Going
"I Gotta Start Somewhere"	2008	—	Good Thing Going
"Stop the World (And Let Me Off)"	2009	—	Destination Life
"One" (with Daryle Singletary)	2017	—	American Grandstand
"—" denotes releases that did not chart

== Other appearances ==
Song	Year	Album
"Staying Together" (with Gene Watson)	2009	A Taste of the Truth
"Please" (with Dolly Parton)	2018	Restoration: Reimagining the Songs of Elton John and Bernie Taupin

== Music videos ==
Video	Year	Director
"I'm Not Over You"	1993	
"What Else Could I Do"	1994	
"What More Do You Want from Me"	1995	R. Brad Murano/Steven T. Miller
"I Sang Dixie"	1998	
"I'm Not Over You"	2002	Warren P. Sonoda
"You Can't Take It With You When You Go"	2003	Brent Hedgecock
"If Heartaches Had Wings"	2003	Deaton-Flanigen Productions
"I've Forgotten You"	2005	Brent Hedgecock
"Heartbreaker's Alibi"	2006	Trey Fanjoy
"I Gotta Start Somewhere"	2008	Dallas Henry
"Staying Together"	2009	Stephen Shepherd
"Taken"	2011	
"Dreaming Of Christmas"	2016	
