= Cryin' Holy unto the Lord =

Cryin' Holy Unto the Lord

Studio album by Bill Monroe
- Released: October 13, 1998
- Studio: Reflections Studio; Sound Emporium; Digital Recorders
- Genre: Gospel
- Length: 28:05
- Label: MCA Records
- Producer: Steve Buchanan

Bill Monroe chronology
Southern Flavor (1988)	Cryin' Holy Unto the Lord (1998)

Professional ratings
Review scores
Source	Rating
AllMusic	3/5 stars

Cryin' Holy Unto the Lord is a 1991 album and the last studio album by Bill Monroe & the Blue Grass Boys, released by MCA Records, now Universal Music Group. This album was produced by President of Opry Entertainment, Steve Buchanan.

== Critical reception ==
Michael McCall of AllMusic writes, "An all-gospel album propped up with some stellar guests, it includes Ricky Skaggs, Ralph Stanley, the Osborne Brothers, Jim & Jesse McReynolds, and Mac Wiseman."

Stewart Evans writes in his review, "Ultimately, this album is not one of Monroe's all-time greats, but it's quite a nice work, all the more impressive considering the length of Monroe's career."

== Track listing ==
No.	Title	Writer(s)	Length
1.	"Cryin' Holy Unto The Lord"	Irene Amburgey	2:54
2.	"Harbor Of Love"	Carter Stanley	3:27
3.	"Shine Hallelujah Shine"	Bill Monroe	2:28
4.	"Just Over In The Glory Land"	Traditional	2:59
5.	"Just a Little Talk with Jesus"	Cleavant Derricks	2:25
6.	"You're Drifting Away"	Bill Monroe	2:37
7.	"He'll Take You In"	Steffan Baker; Billy Smith	3:01
8.	"This World Is Not My Home"	J. R. Baster, Jr.	2:35
9.	"Baptize Me In The Cumberland River"	Bill Monroe	2:34
10.	"Are You Lost In Sin?"	Jesse McReynolds; Jim McReynolds	3:05
Total length:			28:05

== Musicians ==
- Bill Monroe – Mandolin (All Tracks), Tenor Vocal (Track 1 through 8, 10), Lead Vocal (Track 9)
- Tom Ewing – Acoustic Guitar (All tracks except 6), Lead Vocal (Track 1, 3, 5, 7), Baritone Vocal (Track 6)
- Clarence "Tater" Tate – Fiddle (Track 1 through 8, 10), Bass Vocal (Track 1 through 7, 9, 10), Banjo (Track 8), Baritone Vocal (Track 8)
- Blake Williams – Banjo (Track 1 through 5, 7, 8, 10), Baritone Vocal (Track 1, 3, 5, 7)
- Ralph Stanley – Lead Vocal (Track 2)
- Ricky Skaggs – Acoustic Guitar (Track 2, 6), Baritone Vocal (Track 2), Lead Vocal (Track 6)
- Billy Rose – Acoustic Bass (Track 2 Through 10)
- Jim Campbell – Fiddle (Track 2, 7, 10)
- Bobby Osborne – Mandolin, Lead Vocal (Track 4)
- Sonny Osborne – Banjo, Baritone Vocal (Track 4)
- Mac Wiseman – Acoustic Guitar, Lead Vocal (Track 8)
- Jim McReynolds – Lead Vocal (Track 10)
- Jesse McReynolds – Mandolin, Baritone Vocal (Track 10)

== Production ==
- Produced by Steve Buchanan
- Recorded and Mixed by David Parrish
- Recording Assistance: Gene Wooten
- Recorded at Reflections Studio, Sound Emporium, and Digital Recorders
- Mixed at Masterlink Studio, Reflections Studio
- Mastered by Glenn Meadows at Masterfonics, Nashville, Tennessee
- Art Direction: Simon Levy
- Photography: Jim DeVault

Track information and credits verified from the album's liner notes. Album credits can also be found at Discogs and AllMusic
