= Red Allen (bluegrass) =

American bluegrass musician (1930–1993)

- Also known as: Red Allen
- Born: Harley Allen; February 12, 1930; Pigeon Roost Hollow, Kentucky, U.S.
- Origin: Dayton, Ohio, United States
- Died: April 3, 1993 (aged 63) Dayton, Ohio, U.S.
- Genres: Bluegrass, Country
- Occupation: Bluegrass musician
- Instrument: Guitar
- Years active: 1950s–1980s
- Labels: Folkways, Rounder, MGM, Acoustic Disc, County, King Records, Melodeon, Patuxent Music
- Formerly of: The Osborne Brothers, The Allen Brothers, The Blue Ridge Mountain Boys, Frank Wakefield (The Kentuckians), Jimmy Martin (The Sunny Mountain Boys), Harley Allen

Harley Allen (February 12, 1930 – April 3, 1993), better known as Red Allen, was an American bluegrass band leader, singer and guitarist known for his powerful tenor voice.

== Biography ==
Allen, born in Pigeon Roost Hollow, near Mt. Sterling, Kentucky, grew up in the music-rich hills of eastern Kentucky, and following a stint in the Marines, settled in Dayton, Ohio, in 1949, where he began performing professionally. In 1952, Allen discovered a young teenage mandolin virtuoso named Frank Wakefield, who had moved to Dayton from Harriman, Tennessee. Soon Wakefield became a member of Allen's first band, the Blue Ridge Mountain Boys. The band also included the legendary Ohio five string banjo player, Noah Crase. They worked the local bars along Dayton's Fifth Street as well as the rough blue collar taverns which made up the Ohio and Michigan bluegrass circuit at the time. Allen first came to broader public attention in 1956 when he joined the Osborne Brothers to fill out one of the most influential vocal trios in the history of country music. He made his first recordings with the Osborne Brothers on July 1, 1956, when they recorded four songs including Ruby, Ho Honey Ho and Once More. Once More has been called a "landmark in three-part vocal harmony." The trio were now featured cast members on the World's Original Jamboree radio show over WWVA in Wheeling, West Virginia. In 1958, Allen left the group and returned to Dayton.

Frank Wakefield, meanwhile had also returned to Dayton having himself garnered national exposure with the release of some hot selling singles recorded in Detroit the year before including the seminal mandolin instrumental New Camptown Races and also touring with Jimmy Martin and the Sunny Mountain Boys. Allen and Wakefield then formed their second partnership resulting in some single recordings made with local banjo player, Red Spurlock and released under the professional name The Red Heads on the BMC label. The records were poorly marketed and Wakefield left Ohio in late 1959 to explore better career opportunities in the bluegrass-rich DC–Baltimore area. In 1960, Allen followed suit and the two reunited as Red Allen, and The Kentuckians. The Washington, D.C., area had a thriving bluegrass scene which included Buzz Busby and the Bayou Boys, The Country Gentlemen, Don Reno and Red Smiley and the Tennessee Cutups, The Stoneman Family and Wilma Lee and Stoney Cooper. Allen and Wakefield were soon performing regularly at area night spots and on a regular Sunday afternoon broadcast over station WDON in Wheaton, Maryland. On July 4, 1961, the band was among a small handful invited to perform at Bill Clifton's first-ever one day Bluegrass Festival held at Luray, Virginia. In November 1961, Allen and Wakefield recorded six sides in Nashville with a group that included banjo legend Don Reno, fiddle master Chubby Wise and bassist John Palmer for the Starday label featuring the popular Trouble 'Round My Door and Beautiful Blue Eyes. By 1963 Allen, Wakefield and their band had performed at both Carnegie Hall and at the trendy folk music club, Gerde's Folk City in New York City. In addition to Wakefield, at various times the touring version of The Kentuckians included Tom Morgan on bass, Pete Kuykendall, Bill Keith or Ralph Robinson on banjo and Scotty Stoneman or Billy Baker on fiddle.

In 1964 Allen, Wakefield and their band made a much-admired album for Folkways simply called Bluegrass, produced by a young David Grisman, an admirer of Allen and a mandolin student of Wakefield. The recording showed a larger public that Allen was a true disciple of the high lonesome sound associated with Bill Monroe. At his best, Allen drenched his material in emotion, each song propelled by his surging rhythm guitar playing. As he later said, "Bluegrass is sad music. It's always been sad and the people that's never lived it, it'll take them a long time to know what it is."

After Frank Wakefield left the band in 1965 to join the Greenbriar Boys, Allen replaced him with Wakefield's protégé David Grisman. They went on to record for County Records and King Records with noted banjo player J.D. Crowe. The collaboration with Crowe, called Bluegrass Holiday featured some of Allen's strongest vocal performances. Allen's prominence on the record created a sound quite distinct from how Crowe and his Kentucky Mountain Boys sounded. Grisman, who would go on to pioneer a contemporary style of acoustic music called DAWG music, later said that by hiring him for the Kentuckians, Allen gave him "a college education in bluegrass music."

Allen's sons Ronnie, Greg, Neal and Harley performed and recorded as the Allen Brothers, both with and without their father, throughout the 1970s and 1980s.

== Death and legacy ==
Allen died on April 3, 1993, in Dayton, Ohio. He is buried at Highland Memorial Cemetery in Miamisburg, Ohio.

He was inducted into the Society for the Preservation of Bluegrass Music of America Hall of Fame in 1995. In 2005, Red Allen was inducted into the IBMA Bluegrass Hall of Fame.

== Vocal arrangements ==
Until the Osbornes' 1958 hit Once More, the typical arrangement called for a lead" singer to provide the melody with a tenor singing a higher part with a baritone below. Once More, which reached No. 13 on the charts, featured the lead sung by the highest voice of the group, mandolinist Bobby Osborne. Allen sang the baritone just below the melody and banjo player Sonny Osborne provided the tenor a full octave below its place in a traditional arrangement. The result, as the Osbornes themselves observed, allowed singers to mimic the sliding tonal effects of the pedal steel guitar. Contemporary singers using this device include Rhonda Vincent.

== Selected discography ==
=== Albums ===
Year	Title	Label	Catalog number	Notes
1959	Country Pickin' And Hillside Singin'	MGM	E-3734	With the Osborne Brothers, also MGM SL 5069 (Japan)
1964	Bluegrass	Folkways	FTS-02408	With Frank Wakefield and the Kentuckians
1965	Solid Bluegrass Sound of the Kentuckians	Melodeon	MLP-7325	
1966	Bluegrass Country, Vol. 1	County	704	
1967	Bluegrass Country, Vol. 2	County	710	
1972	Allengrass	Lemco	LLP-612	also on King
1973	My Old Kentucky Home	King	523	With the Allen Brothers
1973	Favorites	King	542	With the Allen Brothers
1976	Red Allen & Frank Wakefield	Red Clay	RC-104	With the Allen Brothers (Japan)
1979	Live and Let Live	Folkways	FTS-31065	
197?	Red Allen Live	Storyville	SRYP-1211	1960s radio transcriptions (Denmark/Japan)
1980	In Memory of the Man: Dedicated to Lester Flatt	Folkways	FTS-31073	
1981	Red Allen and Friends	Folkways	FTS-31088	
1983	The Red Allen Tradition	Folkways	FTS-31097	
198?	Bluegrass & County	Fundamental	SAVE 29	(UK)
1992	Bluegrass Reunion	Acoustic Disc	ACD-4	with Jerry Garcia as guest
1994	The Kitchen Tapes	Acoustic Disc	ACD-11	Recorded 1963

=== Compilations ===
Year	Title	Label	Catalog number	Notes
1984	Classic Recordings, 1954–69	Collector's Classics	CC LP 21	(Germany)
2001	The Folkways Years, 1964–1983	Smithsonian Folkways	SFW-40127	Compilation plus 6 unreleased tracks
2004	Keep On Going: The Rebel & Melodeon Recordings	Rebel	1127	
2004	Lonesome and Blue: The Complete County Recordings	Rebel	1128	

== See also ==
- Harley Allen
- The Osborne Brothers
- Frank Wakefield
- Bill Monroe
