= The Father of Blue Grass Music =

Compilation album by Bill Monroe and his Blue Grass Boys
- Released: August 4, 1962
- Recorded: October 7, 1940; October 2, 1941
- Studio: Kimball House (Atlanta, Georgia)
- Genre: Bluegrass; gospel
- Length: 33:04
- Label: RCA Camden
- Producer: Frank B. Walker; Dan Hornsby

Bill Monroe chronology
Bluegrass Ramble (1962)	The Father of Blue Grass Music (1962)	My All Time Country Favorites (1962)

The Father of Blue Grass Music is the second compilation album by American bluegrass musician Bill Monroe and his band, the Blue Grass Boys. Released by RCA Camden on August 4, 1962, it features 12 of the 16 songs the band recorded at their first sessions in October 1940 and October 1941, all of which were originally released as singles or B-sides by Bluebird Records. The album was later reissued by BMG Heritage Records in 2002 as part of its RCA Country Legends series.

== Background ==
Bill Monroe and his Blue Grass Boys completed two recording sessions for their first label, Bluebird Records (a subsidiary of RCA Victor): on October 7, 1940, and October 2, 1941. They recorded eight songs at each session, which made up two runs of four singles released between November 1940 and May 1942. Shortly thereafter, the 1942–1944 musicians' strike begun and the band were unable to record, during which time Monroe signed a new deal with Columbia Records, thus ending his association with RCA Victor/Bluebird. The 1940 session featured a Blue Grass Boys lineup of guitarist and vocalist Clyde Moody, fiddler Tommy Magness, and bassist Bill "Cousin Wilbur" Wesbrooks; by the time of the 1941 session, Moody and Magness had been replaced by Pete Pyle and Art Wooten, respectively.

== Release ==
The Father of Blue Grass Music was originally released by RCA Camden on August 4, 1962. The title was inspired by the emergence of "The Father of Bluegrass" as an honorific nickname for Monroe, which was credited by future Blue Grass Boys member Tom Ewing in his 2018 biography of Monroe as having been first coined by Mike Seeger in the liner notes for the 1959 Folkways Records compilation Mountain Music Bluegrass Style, and later repeated in the 1961 book A History and Encyclopedia of Country, Western, and Gospel Music, written by Linnell Gentry. The album contains 12 of the 16 songs recorded at the first two Blue Grass Boys sessions. The compilation was reissued several times in later years, including in 1977 by Pickwick Records, and in 1987 by RCA International. On June 11, 2002, the album was repackaged with the remaining four songs from the 1940 and 1941 sessions, and re-released as part of the RCA Country Legends series by BMG Heritage Records.

== Reception ==
Professional ratings
Review scores
Source	Rating
AllMusic	4/5 stars

The Father of Blue Grass Music received positive reviews from music critics. In a piece for Country Music mentioning the 1987 reissue of the album, Rich Kienzle claimed that "Anyone with even the slightest interest in bluegrass music needs this one, for it is truly where the Monroe dynasty begins." In a four-star review of the 2002 RCA Country Legends release, AllMusic writer Tim Sendra claimed that the album "does a nice job showing the roots of bluegrass", but suggested that "This set is a not an essential purchase; a collection of Monroe's Columbia years would fit that bill. However, it is a good set for those who wish to dig a little deeper." Robert Christgau gave the reissue an A− rating, reflecting that "these 1940-41 recordings share a sense of innocent fun with the mountain music Monroe was just then jazzing up".

== Track listing ==
The Father of Blue Grass Music track listing
No.	Title	Writer(s)	Original release	Length
1.	"Six White Horses" (recorded October 7, 1940)	Clyde Moody	"Mule Skinner Blues" B-side (1940)	3:00
2.	"Dog House Blues" (recorded October 7, 1940)	Moody; Pee Wee King; Joseph L. Frank	single A-side (1941)	3:02
3.	"Tennessee Blues" (recorded October 7, 1940)	Bill Monroe	single A-side (1941)	2:55
4.	"No Letter in the Mail" (recorded October 7, 1940)	Bill Carlisle	"Cryin' Holy unto the Lord" B-side (1941)	2:37
5.	"Blue Yodel No. 7 (Anniversary Blue Yodel)" (recorded October 2, 1941)	Jimmie Rodgers	single A-side (1941)	2:50
6.	"Orange Blossom Special" (recorded October 2, 1941)	Ervin T. Rouse	"The Coupon Song" B-side (1942)	2:30
7.	"Mule Skinner Blues" (recorded October 7, 1940)	Rodgers	single A-side (1940)	2:37
8.	"Katy Hill" (recorded October 7, 1940)	Traditional, arr. Monroe	"Dog House Blues" B-side (1941)	2:35
9.	"I Wonder If You Feel the Way I Do" (recorded October 7, 1940)	Bob Wills	"Tennessee Blues" B-side (1941)	2:47
10.	"Honky Tonk Swing" (recorded October 2, 1941)	Monroe	"Back Up and Push" B-side (1942)	2:27
11.	"In the Pines" (recorded October 2, 1941)	Clayton McMichen	"Blue Yodel No. 7" B-side (1941)	3:17
12.	"Back Up and Push" (recorded October 2, 1941)	Traditional, arr. Monroe	single A-side (1942)	2:27
Total length:				33:04

RCA Country Legends (2002 reissue of The Father of Blue Grass Music) track listing
No.	Title	Writer(s)	Original release	Length
1.	"Mule Skinner Blues" (recorded October 7, 1940)	Rodgers	single A-side (1940)	2:44
2.	"No Letter in the Mail" (recorded October 7, 1940)	Carlisle	"Cryin' Holy unto the Lord" B-side (1941)	2:40
3.	"Cryin' Holy unto the Lord" (recorded October 7, 1940)	Traditional	single A-side (1941)	2:29
4.	"Six White Horses" (recorded October 7, 1940)	Moody	"Mule Skinner Blues" B-side (1940)	3:02
5.	"Dog House Blues" (recorded October 7, 1940)	Moody; King; Frank	single A-side (1941)	3:05
6.	"I Wonder If You Feel the Way I Do" (recorded October 7, 1940)	Wills	"Tennessee Blues" B-side (1941)	2:51
7.	"Katy Hill" (recorded October 7, 1940)	Traditional, arr. Monroe	"Dog House Blues" B-side (1941)	2:39
8.	"Tennessee Blues" (recorded October 7, 1940)	Monroe	single A-side (1941)	2:51
9.	"Shake My Mother's Hand for Me" (recorded October 2, 1941)	Thomas A. Dorsey	single A-side (1942)	3:06
10.	"Were You There?" (recorded October 2, 1941)	Traditional, arr. Monroe	"Shake My Mother's Hand for Me" B-side (1942)	2:49
11.	"Blue Yodel No. 7 (Anniversary Blue Yodel)" (recorded October 2, 1941)	Rodgers	single A-side (1941)	2:53
12.	"The Coupon Song" (recorded October 2, 1941)	Traditional	single A-side (1942)	2:57
13.	"Orange Blossom Special" (recorded October 2, 1941)	Rouse	"The Coupon Song" B-side (1942)	2:33
14.	"Honky Tonk Swing" (recorded October 2, 1941)	Monroe	"Back Up and Push" B-side (1942)	2:31
15.	"In the Pines" (recorded October 2, 1941)	McMichen	"Blue Yodel No. 7" B-side (1941)	3:17
16.	"Back Up and Push" (recorded October 2, 1941)	Traditional, arr. Monroe	single A-side (1942)	2:27
Total length:				45:21

== Personnel ==
Tracks 1–4 and 7–9 (recorded October 7, 1940)

- Bill Monroe — mandolin (all except track 7), guitar (track 7), vocals (lead on tracks 2 and 7; tenor on tracks 4 and 9)
- Clyde Moody — guitar (all except track 7), mandolin (track 7), lead vocals (tracks 1, 4 and 9)
- Tommy Magness — fiddle
- Bill "Cousin Wilbur" Wesbrooks — string bass

Tracks 5, 6 and 10–12 (recorded October 2, 1941)

- Bill Monroe — mandolin, vocals (lead on track 5; tenor on tracks 6 and 11)
- Pete Pyle — guitar
- Art Wooten — fiddle (all except track 10)
- Bill "Cousin Wilbur" Wesbrooks — string bass, lead vocals (track 11)

== Bibliography ==
- Ewing, Tom (September 7, 2018), Bill Monroe: The Life and Music of the Blue Grass Man (Music in American Life), Champaign, Illinois: University of Illinois Press, ISBN 978-0252041891
- Rosenberg, Neil V.; Wolfe, Charles K. (June 7, 2007), The Music of Bill Monroe: Music in American Life, Champaign, Illinois: University of Illinois Press, ISBN 978-0252031212
