= Frank Wakefield =

- Born: Franklin Delano Wakefield; June 26, 1934; Emory Gap, Tennessee, U.S.
- Origin: Dayton, Ohio, U.S.
- Died: April 26, 2024 (aged 89) Saratoga Springs, New York, U.S.
- Genres: Bluegrass, Country, Original
- Instrument: Mandolin
- Formerly of: Red Allen, Jimmy Martin, Don Reno, Jerry Garcia, Ralph Stanley, David Grisman, Greenbriar Boys

Franklin Delano Wakefield (June 26, 1934 – April 26, 2024) was an American mandolin player in the bluegrass music style. Wakefield was known for his collaborations with a number of well-known musical artists, including Red Allen, Jimmy Martin, Don Reno, Jerry Garcia, David Grisman, The Stanley Brothers, and the Greenbriar Boys.

== Biography ==
Born into a musical family in Emory Gap, Tennessee, Wakefield by age eight already knew how to play harmonica, guitar and bass. In 1950, his family moved to Dayton, Ohio. At the age of 16 he had switched to the mandolin and began playing music with his brother Ralph on guitar. The duo called themselves The Wakefield Brothers and in 1951, made their first radio appearance playing gospel and old-time music on WHIO in Dayton.

In 1952 Wakefield began a long and productive collaboration with the bluegrass singer and guitar player, Red Allen. For the next 3 years Wakefield toured with Red Allen and the Blue Ridge Mountain Boys. Through the rest of the decade Wakefield also toured with Jimmy Martin and the Sunny Mountain Boys as well as Marvin Cobb and the Chain Mountain Boys, with whom he recorded his first 45 RPM—which included his now most famous bluegrass composition, "New Camptown Races". In 1958 Wakefield reunited with Red Allen and his band the Kentuckians. The popular Kentuckians cut many 45s in following years, had a weekly radio show, and even played at Carnegie Hall in 1963. Important CD recordings surviving from this period of Wakefield's career include Red Allen and Frank Wakefield: the Kitchen Tapes and Red Allen: the Folkway Years 1964-1983. In 1960, Wakefield moved to Washington, D.C., with Red Allen and there began giving private lessons. One of his students at this time was a young David Grisman.

In the mid-1960s Wakefield began playing mandolin with the Greenbriar Boys as well as appearing with Ralph Stanley. Also in this period he began turning to new influences, composing classical mandolin sonatas and arranging classical pieces for traditional bluegrass instruments. This innovative style offered him the opportunity to play with the New York Philharmonic, led by Leonard Bernstein in 1967 and an invitation to appear as a guest with the Boston Pops in 1968.

By the 1970s Wakefield launched a solo career. He released his first solo album in 1972 and his second in 1975 backed up by bluegrass heavyweights Don Reno and Chubby Wise. He toured with Jerry Garcia, and New Riders of the Purple Sage and opened for the Grateful Dead. By mid-decade Wakefield began working with his newly formed band, The Good Ol' Boys with whom he would enjoy a productive collaboration until the mid-1980s. Since 1989 he has toured with the Frank Wakefield Band. In 1999 he earned a Grammy Nomination for best bluegrass album of the year for his work on the album Bluegrass Mandolin Extravaganza on which he played with fellow mandolin greats Sam Bush, David Grisman, Ronnie McCoury, Jesse McReynolds, Bobby Osborne, Ricky Skaggs and Buck White.

Mandolin player David Grisman said of Wakefield's influence, "He split the bluegrass mandolin atom. Some of us, obviously, will never be the same again." Wakefield continued to record and tour nationally.

Wakefield died on April 26, 2024, at the age of 89.

== Discography ==
Solo

- End Of The Rainbow (Bay Records 214, L-999, 1980)
- Blues Stay Away From Me (Takoma, 1980)
- That Was Now . . . This Is Then (Rosewood Records RA62096, 1996)
- Don't Lie To Me (Patuxent Music CD-075, 2003)
- A Tribute To Bill Monroe (Patuxent Music MVF5504, PXCD-227, 2011)

With Red Allen

- The Kitchen Tapes (Original Recordings From 1963) (Acoustic Disc, 1994)

With Red Allen and the Kentuckians

- Bluegrass (Folkways Records, 1964)
- The WDON Recordings 1963 (Patuxent Music CD-258, 2014)

With Country Cooking

- Frank Wakefield (Rounder Records, 1972)

With Joe Isaacs and Richard Greene

- The Greenbriar Years (Old Homestead Records OHCS-115, 1977)

With the Good Ol’ Boys

- Frank Wakefield & The Good Ol' Boys (Flying Fish, 1978)
- Frank Wakefield And The Good Old Boys (with special guest Dave Nelson) (Relix Records, 1992)
- She's No Angel (Relix Records, 1992)

Roy Lee Centers with Jack Lynch and Band

- The Early Years, Volume 1 (Vetco Records LP3030, 1978)

With Sam Bush, David Grisman, Ronnie McCoury, Jesse McReynolds, Bobby Osborne, Ricky Skaggs, and Buck White with Del McCoury

- Bluegrass Mandolin Extravaganza (Acoustic Disc ACD-35, 171750, 171751, 1999)

With Taylor Baker

- Frank Wakefield, Taylor Baker & Friends (Patuxent Music CD-247, 2013)

With David Nelson, Brantley Kearns, Jerry Garcia, Pat Campbell, and the Good Ol’ Boys

- Drink Up & Go Home (RockBeat Records ROC-3427, 2019)

Singles & EPs

- Leave Well Enough Alone / You're The One (with Buster Turner) (Wayside Records W-150, 1957)
- Little Birdie / Faded Memory (with Red Allen) (Rebel Recording Co. F-242-45, 1963)
- Rondo / Musicians Waltz (Rebel Records F-245-45, 1963)
- I'll Never Make You Blue (Silver-Belle Records GS-45-1005, 1965)
- Ruby (Kapp Records, 1969)

Compilations

- The Folkways Years 1964-1983 (with Red Allen) (Smithsonian Folkways, 2001)
