= Thousandsticks, Kentucky =

Unincorporated community in Kentucky, United States

- Unincorporated community
- Location within Kentucky Location within the United States
- Coordinates: 37°11′06″N 83°25′44″W
- Country: United States
- State: Kentucky
- County: Leslie
- Elevation: 961 ft (293 m)
- Time zone: UTC-5 (Eastern (EST))
  - Summer (DST): UTC-4 (EDT)
- ZIP code: 41766
- Area code: 606
- GNIS feature ID: 515934

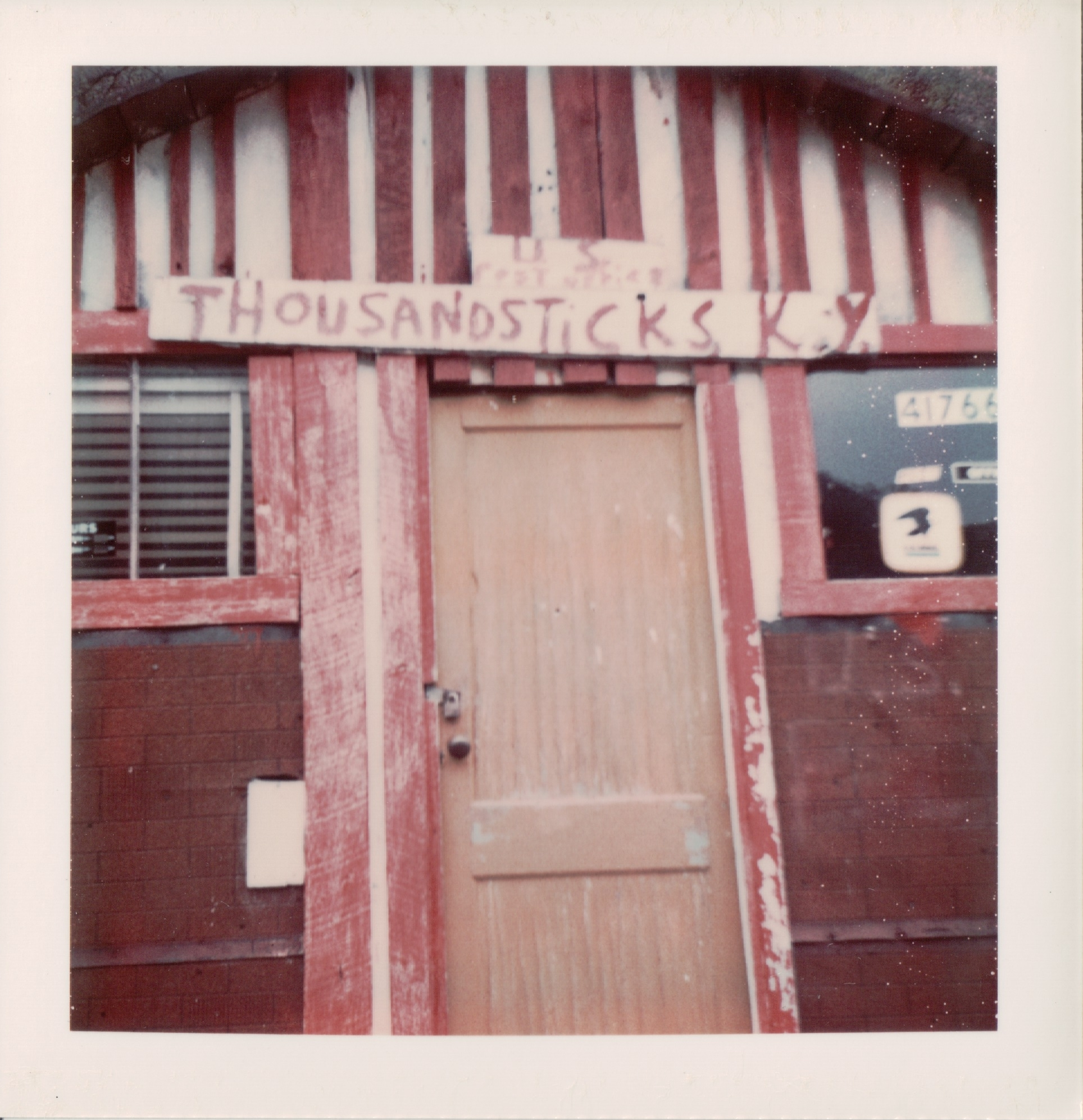
Post Office at Thousandsticks KY 1975

Thousandsticks is an unincorporated community in Leslie County, Kentucky, United States. Thousandsticks is located at the junction of the Hal Rogers Parkway and Kentucky Route 118 3.5 miles (5.6 km) northwest of Hyden. Thousandsticks had a post office with ZIP code 41766 which closed in 2005.

== History ==
A post office called Thousandsticks had been in operation since 1924. The community was named after nearby Thousandsticks Branch.

== Notable people ==
- Bobby Osborne, bluegrass musician
- Sonny Osborne, bluegrass musician
