= Amos Garren =

Franklin "Amos" Garren was the first bassist for Bill Monroe and his band, the Blue Grass Boys. He was the bass player on Monroe's hit recording of "Mule Skinner Blues." Though he was not in the Blue Grass Boys for a long time, his impact as a double bass player is still seen today.

== History ==
Franklin "Amos" Garren was born in North Carolina on May 10, 1914. He was one of the first bluegrass "bass players." Bill Monroe selected Amos Garren to become his bass player after the band moved to Greenville, South Carolina. Amos Garren was hired in 1942, as Bill Monroe, known now as the "father of bluegrass music", was assembling his band. Garren died on May 10, 1977.

== Professional career ==
Amos Garren started his career with Bill Monroe & The Bluegrass Boys in August 1939, after "Snowball" Millard left the band in July to be with his wife who was expecting a baby. The band praised Garren for his singing abilities. The band's gospel songs were given more attention by listeners because of the quartet style in which they were performed. The quartet featured Garren on lead, Monroe and Art Wooten on tenor, and Johnnie Davis on bass. The band was the first to receive an encore on a broadcast, during a performance on the Grand Ole Opry. After the Garren was hired, Monroe began promoting the band and this specific lineup. Amos was playing bass with Monroe when Monroe made his Opry debut. Monroe loved his solid foundation on the bass and was happy in hiring Garren, as now Davis has a solid backing for his rhythm. Amos Garren left the band in 1940, right before the Blue Grass Boys recorded their first album.

== Songs that Amos Garren played with Bill Monroe ==
Year / Date	Song	Band Name	Band Members	Venue / Name of album
November 25, 1939	Bile 'Em Cabbage Down*	Bill Monroe & The Bluegrass Boys	Bill Monroe, Johnnie "Cleo" Davis, Art Wooten	Grand Ole Opry - Nashville, Tennessee
1965	Uncle Pen	Bill Monroe & The Bluegrass Boys	Bill Monroe, Johnnie "Cleo" Davis, Art Wooten	Porter Wagoner Show
1965	Blue Grass Breakdown	Bill Monroe & The Bluegrass Boys	Bill Monroe, Johnnie "Cleo" Davis, Art Wooten	
