= Cleo Davis =

American musician

Cleo Davis (March 9, 1919 – July 17, 1986) was an American musician from Georgia who gained prominence as "the original Blue Grass Boy". The creator of the "Blue Grass Boys" was Bill Monroe, also known as The Father of Bluegrass. Davis' performing career spanned 48 years as a singer and instrumentalist, and greatly influenced the bluegrass music and bluegrass artists of today.

== Early life ==
Davis was born to Ben and Effie Davis in their home in northwest Georgia. Cleo was surrounded by music since he was born, with his mother playing the pump organ and father playing the banjo (clawhammer style). After his first guitar was sat on, he ordered a new one from a Sears and Roebuck catalog, which cost $2.40.

== Musical career ==
In August 1938, Davis went to an audition for Bill Monroe from an ad he saw in a newspaper to play "old-time songs." After the successful audition, Bill took Davis to a local pawn shop where Bill bought Davis $37.50 orchestra style guitar. Bill then bought Davis a new suit of clothes and a Stetson hat. Davis spent the next two months practicing without performing to perfect their act. They mostly worked up songs that Bill did with the Monroe Brothers (Bill and Charlie Monroe) due to the similarities of Davis' and Charlie's singing. Like Charlie, Cleo did also play the guitar. Bill and Davis auditioned at several radio stations before they got their first gig as a duet at WWNC in Asheville, North Carolina.

Bill Monroe hired more members to the group as they grew in popularity. They went by the name of "Bill Monroe and his Blue Grass Boys". Bill Monroe and his Blue Grass Boys first appeared at the Grand Ole Opry in 1939 and later joined as members. Davis continued in the band until late 1940 to form his own group. Late in 1941, he went to fight in WWII. Davis moved to Florida when he returned from WWII and landed a job playing for the WLAK radio station. Davis ended his music career by helping fund and organize the Florida Opry House.
