= Bluegrass Reunion =

Studio album by David Grisman
- Released: 1992
- Recorded: 1991
- Genre: Bluegrass
- Length: 46:52
- Label: Rounder
- Producer: David Grisman

David Grisman chronology
Dawg '90 (1990)	Bluegrass Reunion (1992)	Jerry Garcia / David Grisman (1991)

Professional ratings
Review scores
Source	Rating
Allmusic	4/5 stars

Bluegrass Reunion is an album by American musician David Grisman released in 1991. For this album of traditional bluegrass, he put together five musicians with whom he cooperated before in some way, especially guitarist Red Allen, who provides his tenor voice for this album.

== Track listing ==
1. "Back Up and Push" (theme) – 0:50
2. "She's No Angel" (trad.) – 2:21
3. "I'm Just Here to Get My Baby Out Of Jail" (Davis, Taylor) – 3:25
4. "The Fields Have Turned Brown" (Stanley) – 4:42
5. "To Love and Live Together" – 2:323
6. "I'm Blue, I'm Lonesome" – 3:35
7. "Pidgeon [sic] Roost" – 2:14
8. "Down Where the River Bends" – 3:58
9. "Love Please Come Home" (Jackson) – 2:22
10. "Letter From My Darlin" – 3:27
11. "Is This My Destiny?" (Carter) – 3:03
12. "Ashes of Love" – 2:18
13. "Is it Too Late Now?" – 3:39
14. "Little Maggie" – 3:00
15. "Will You Miss Me When I'm Gone?" – 4:48
16. "Back Up and Push" (theme) – 0:38

== Personnel ==
- David Grisman – mandolin, vocals
- Red Allen – guitar, vocals
- Jim Buchanan – violin, vocals
- Jerry Garcia – guitar, vocals
- Jim Kerwin – bass
- Herb Pedersen – banjo, vocals
