= RCA Country Legends =

RCA Country Legends is a series of compilation albums highlighting various RCA Victor recording artists from the country music genre.

The series began in 2000 with compilations of Eddy Arnold and Charley Pride. The following year, albums by Floyd Cramer, Jerry Reed, Waylon Jennings, Hank Snow, Ronnie Milsap, Don Gibson, Dottie West, Skeeter Davis, Chet Atkins, and John Hartford were released. 2002 saw the introduction of collections of Sylvia, John Anderson, Pam Tillis, Jim Reeves, Porter Wagoner, Keith Whitley, Dolly Parton, Aaron Tippin, Jimmie Rodgers, and Bill Monroe. In 2003, albums by Restless Heart, Lester Flatt, and Hank Locklin were added. The Carter Family, Sons of the Pioneers, and Gary Stewart joined the lineup in 2004. The series then ended, with 28 artists represented over five years.

Albums in the series include:

- RCA Country Legends (Waylon Jennings album), a 2001 compilation of Waylon Jennings songs
- RCA Country Legends – Lorrie Morgan, a 2002 compilation of Lorrie Morgan songs
- RCA Country Legends – Dottie West, a 2001 compilation of Dottie West songs

Other RCA artists in the series include K. T. Oslin.
