= All the Rage (Rhonda Vincent album) =

Studio album by Rhonda Vincent
- Released: November 11, 2016
- Recorded: 2016
- Venue: Bethel University
- Genre: Bluegrass
- Length: 50:34
- Label: Upper Management
- Producer: Rhonda Vincent

Rhonda Vincent chronology
Only Me (2014)	All the Rage (2016)	American Grandstand (2017)

Professional ratings
Review scores
Source	Rating
Allmusic	4.5/5 stars

All the Rage is the twentieth album by country and bluegrass singer Rhonda Vincent. It is Vincent's third live release and her second (following 2005 album Ragin' Live) to give her backing band The Rage star billing alongside her. Released on November 11, 2016 by Vincent's own record label Upper Management Music, All the Rage reached number one on the Billboard Top Bluegrass Albums chart, her seventh album to do so. It was recorded at Bethel University in McKenzie, Tennessee.

The album won Vincent her first Grammy Award for Best Bluegrass Album at the 60th Annual Grammy Awards following six previous nominations as well as the first win for all five members of The Rage (following their one previous nomination for Ragin' Live). In a first for the Best Bluegrass Album category, All the Rage tied with Laws of Gravity by The Infamous Stringdusters for the most votes, with both acts receiving Grammys.

== Track listing ==
No.	Title	Writer(s)	Length
1.	"Muleskinner Blues"	George Vaughn Horton, Jimmie Rodgers	3:54
2.	"Is the Grass Any Bluer (On the Other Side)"	Cory Batten, Buck Moore, Troy Seals	2:59
3.	"Girl from West Virginia"	Clyde Denny, Marie Denny, Wade Hill	2:53
4.	"Midnight Angel"	Pete Goble, Bobby Osborne	3:00
5.	"Wow Baby"	Hunter Berry	2:34
6.	"If We Could Just Pray"	Mickey Harris	3:47
7.	"Freeborn Man"	Keith Allison, Mark Lindsay	4:53
8.	"All About the Banjo"	Aaron McDaris	2:41
9.	"Missouri Moon"	Jennifer Strickland	3:39
10.	"I've Forgotten You"	Brett James, Hillary Lindsey, Angelo Petraglia, Troy Verges	4:14
11.	"You Don't Love God (If You Don't Love Your Neighbor)"	Tommy Coley, Shorty Sullivan	3:27
12.	"Kentucky Borderline"	Terry Herd, Rhonda Vincent	3:56
13.	"The Old Rugged Cross"	Traditional	4:52
14.	"Run Mississippi"	Priscilla Houliston, Carl Jackson	3:45

== Chart performance ==
Chart (2014)	Peak position
US Top Bluegrass Albums (Billboard)	1
US Folk Albums (Billboard)	17
US Heatseekers Albums (Billboard)	6
US Independent Albums (Billboard)	37

== Credits ==
Courtesy of Discogs.

The Rage

- Rhonda Vincent - lead vocals, mandolin, guitar
- Hunter Berry - fiddle, mandolin
- Brent Burke - dobro
- Mickey Harris - bass, backing vocals
- Aaron McDaris - banjo, guitar
- Josh Williams - guitar, mandolin, backing vocals
