= Kentucky Route 118 =

Highway in Kentucky

Kentucky Route 118
- Tim Couch Pass

Route information
- Maintained by KYTC
- Length: 3.524 mi (5.671 km)

Major junctions
- South end: US 421 / KY 80 in Hyden
- North end: Hal Rogers Parkway at Thousandsticks

Location
- Country: United States
- State: Kentucky
- Counties: Leslie

Highway system
- Kentucky State Highway System; Interstate; US; State; Parkways
← KY 117	→ US 119

Kentucky Route 118 (KY 118), also known as the Hyden Spur and the Tim Couch Pass, is a 3.524 mile (5.671 km) long state highway in southeastern Kentucky, running entirely in Leslie County. The route originates at exit 44 of the Hal Rogers Parkway near the unincorporated community of Thousandsticks, and connects with US 421 in the county seat of Hyden.

== Route description ==
The road, a modern two-lane road with an extra climbing lane where necessary, was originally the Hyden Spur of the Daniel Boone Parkway (now the Hal Rogers Parkway). Shortly after exiting the parkway, the road climbs a large hill for roughly a mile (1.6 km). The last mile into Hyden is a 7% downhill grade, with a runaway truck ramp near its end at US 421.

The road is also known as Tim Couch Pass, after the former University of Kentucky and NFL quarterback, who is a Hyden native.

== History ==
KY 118 was formed by 1976.

The original KY 118 ran from the Ohio River near East Cairo to US 68 in Barlow. This was removed by 1973, and is now Holloway Landing Road.

== Major intersections ==
The entire route is in Leslie County.

Location	mi	km	Destinations	Notes
Hyden	0.000	0.000	US 421 / KY 80	Southern terminus
Thousandsticks	3.449	5.551	KY 3424 (Davidson Fork Road / Bull Creek Road)	
Thousandsticks	3.524	5.671	Hal Rogers Parkway – London, Manchester, Hazard	Northern terminus
1.000 mi = 1.609 km; 1.000 km = 0.621 mi
