= All American Bluegrass Girl =

Studio album by Rhonda Vincent
- Released: May 23, 2006
- Genre: Country/bluegrass
- Label: Rounder Records
- Producer: Rhonda Vincent, Darrin Vincent

Rhonda Vincent chronology
Beautiful Star (2006)	All American Bluegrass Girl (2006)	Good Thing Going (2008)

Professional ratings
Review scores
Source	Rating
Allmusic	3.5/5 stars

All American Bluegrass Girl is the 11th album released by bluegrass musician Rhonda Vincent. The album was released on May 23, 2006, via Rounder Records. The album features 12 songs, three which Vincent wrote or co-wrote. There are also two duets. Dolly Parton sings on "Heartbreaker's Alibi", and a Vincent has a duet with Bobby Osborne on "Midnight Angel".

"Heartbreaker's Albi" and the title track were both released as singles to radio. Although neither one charted, the album reached #1 on the Top Bluegrass Albums, #43 on the Top Country Albums, and #14 on the Top Heatseekers.

== Track listing ==
1. "All American Bluegrass Girl" (Rhonda Vincent) - 3:10
2. "Forever Ain't That Long Anymore" (Blake Williams, Wayne Southards) - 3:29
3. "Heartbreaker's Alibi" (Honey Brassfield) - 3:00
  - duet with Dolly Parton
4. "God Bless the Soldier" (Vincent) - 2:40
5. "Rhythm of the Wheels" (Al Wood) - 3:30
6. "Midnight Angel" (Bobby Osborne, Pete Goble) - 3:11
  - duet with Bobby Osborne
7. "Till They Come Home" (Byron Hill, Mike Dekle) - 4:09
8. "Don't Act" (Connie Leigh) - 2:13
9. "Jesus Built a Bridge to Heaven" (Mark Kevin Grantt, Glen Duncan) - 3:06
10. "Prettiest Flower There" (Val Johnson) - 3:29
11. "Ashes of Mt. Augustine" (Vincent) - 3:29
12. "Precious Jewel" (Roy Acuff) - 4:03

== Personnel ==
- Hunter Berry – fiddle
- Charlie Cushman – banjo
- Stuart Duncan – fiddle, mandolin
- Kevin "Swine" Grantt – double bass
- Cody Kilby – acoustic guitar
- Randy Kohrs – dobro
- Andy Leftwich – mandolin
- Aaron Minick – box
- Bobby Osborne – duet vocals on "Midnight Angel"
- Dolly Parton – duet vocals on "Heartbreaker's Alibi"
- Tom Roady – percussion
- Steve Sheehan – acoustic guitar
- Adam Steffey – mandolin
- Bryan Sutton – Archguitar, acoustic guitar
- Darrin Vincent – double bass, backing vocals
- Rhonda Vincent – mandolin, vocals
- Josh Williams – acoustic guitar, mandolin, backing vocals

== Chart performance ==
=== Album ===
Chart (2006)	Peak position
U.S. Billboard Top Bluegrass Albums	1
U.S. Billboard Top Country Albums	43
U.S. Billboard Top Heatseekers	14

=== Singles ===
Year	Single	Peak positions
Year	Single	US Country
2006	"Heartbreaker's Alibi" (with Dolly Parton)	—
2006	"All American Bluegrass Girl	—
"—" denotes releases that did not chart
