= Clyde Moody =

American singer-songwriter

Clyde Leonard Moody (September 19, 1915 – April 7, 1989), also known as the "Hillbilly Waltz King" and sometimes as "The Genial Gentleman of Country Music" was one of the great founders of American Bluegrass music.

== Early life and career ==
Born in Cherokee, North Carolina, United States, Moody got his start in the late 1930s in the string band J. E. Mainer's Mountaineers. In September 1940 he joined Bill Monroe's Blue Grass Boys on the Grand Ole Opry. Moody's guitar style was unique, with him finger picking with his thumb and index finger. Moody also had a mellow voice that was a good contrast to Bill Monroe's voice. He appeared on Monroe's first solo recording session for RCA Victor's Bluebird label on October 7 of that year, playing guitar and singing lead vocals and bass on the Blue Grass Quartet's first recording ("Cryin' Holy Unto My Lord"). He was featured on that session singing "Six White Horses", a blues-based original. He also has the rare distinction of having played mandolin on a Blue Grass Boys session, as he provided the rhythm chops on "Mule Skinner Blues" and "Dog House Blues", while Monroe played guitar - the only instance where a Blue Grass Boy other than Monroe played mandolin at a Bill Monroe recording session. Upon his departure from the Blue Grass Boys in 1944, he remained at WSM and the Opry for several years as a solo artist. In 1952, he recorded as a member of the Brown's Ferry Four with The Delmore Brothers on King Records. He later played at the first Bluegrass Festival at Fincastle, Virginia, in 1965. His nephew, Bruce Moody (March 14, 1940 – February 21, 2009) was also a popular bluegrass musician and toured with him from 1962–1969.

Some of his career highlights include appearing in the White House three times and writing and recording the million-seller "Shenandoah Waltz" in 1947. He sang with a young Elvis Presley in 1955 when Tom Parker paired them for a six-week tour. Moody was inducted into the North Carolina Music Hall of Fame in 2011.

He died in 1989 in Nashville, Tennessee.

== Discography ==
Clyde Moody's early recordings
Band	year	instrument
Steve Ledford and the Mountaineers	1938	guitar and vocals
Mainer's Mountaineers	1939	guitar and vocals
Happy Go Lucky Boys	1940	guitar, vocals, mandolin
Bill Monroe and the Blue Grass Boys	1940	guitar, vocals, mandolin
Arthur Smith	1940	guitar
