= Sonny Osborne =

American bluegrass musician (1937–2021)

- Born: October 29, 1937; Thousandsticks, Kentucky, US
- Died: October 24, 2021 (aged 83); Hendersonville, Tennessee, US
- Known for: "Rocky Top"
- Spouse: Judy
- Family: Bobby Osborne (brother)
- Musical career
- Instruments: Banjo; banjo guitar
- Years active: 1951–2005
- Labels: RCA; MGM; Decca; Compass

Sonny Osborne (October 29, 1937 – October 24, 2021) was an American bluegrass musician and founding member of the Osborne Brothers.

== Personal life ==
Born on October 29, 1937, in Thousandsticks, Kentucky, Sonny Osborne's father was a farmer, teacher, and amateur banjo, guitar, and fiddle player. His older brother Bobby began playing bluegrass music after the family moved to Dayton, Ohio in 1941. Circa August 2021, when Osborne suffered a stroke, he was married to his wife, Judy. He died at around 1:30 p.m. at home in Hendersonville, Tennessee on October 24, 2021.

== Career ==
Osborne was a baritone singer who played multiple types of banjos over his 53-year musical career.

=== History ===
Osborne was in the sixth grade when he received his first banjo. A prodigy on the instrument, Osborne joined his brother in playing with the Lonesome Pine Fiddlers in the summer of 1951, but returned to Ohio that autumn after Bobby left for the United States Marine Corps. In summer 1952 (at 14-years-old), Sonny Osborne was hired by bluegrass pioneer Bill Monroe, with whom he performed and recorded on the Grand Ole Opry. Barring a brief return to Ohio, Osborne stayed with Monroe into 1953.

When Osborne's brother, singer and mandolin player Bobby Osborne, returned home in 1953 from service in the Korean War, they formed the Osborne Brothers band (1953–2005). They premiered on Knoxville, Tennessee's WROL on November 8, 1953; in their early years, they also performed on Wheeling Jamboree. The brothers and Jimmy Martin recorded twelve singles for RCA Records beginning in 1954. After Martin left due to interpersonal conflict, Red Allen joined the brothers in 1956, and the three later signed with MGM Records, though the record label was reluctant to invest heavily in the trio due to the then-rising popularity of rock and roll. Allen left in 1958 after the release of "Once More", after which the brothers marketed themselves simply as the Osborne Brothers.

When performing at Antioch College in 1960, the brothers became the first bluegrass group to perform for a university audience. In 1963, they debuted at the Grand Ole Opry, signed with Decca Records, and evolved their sound with the mildly-successful release of "Up This Hill and Down": "bluegrass [, ...] kind of bluesy and a little bit of rock."

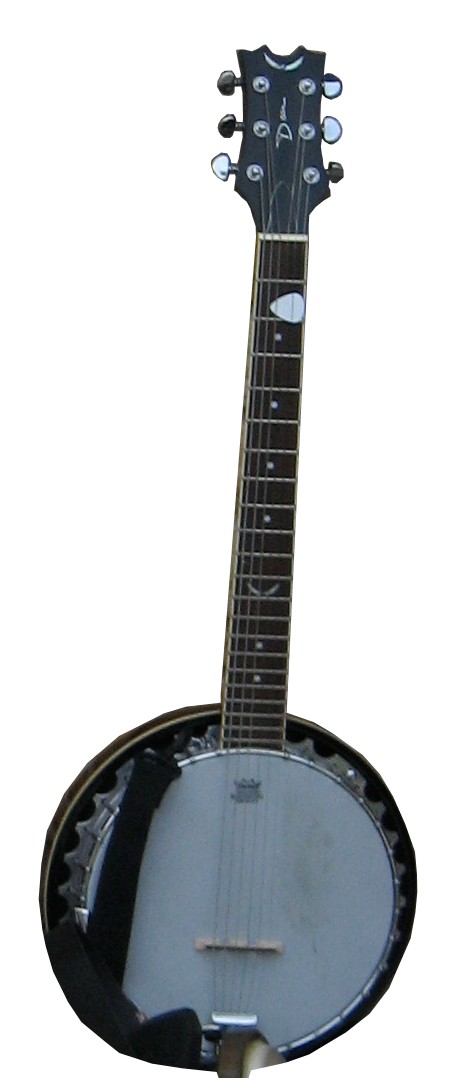
A six-string banjo

It was 1967 when the brothers recorded and released their famous song, "Rocky Top" (written by Felice and Boudleaux Bryant) with 80,000 sales in its first month. At the same time, however, the pair found themselves under scrutiny and attack by bluegrass purists for perceived derivations from the tradition. Osborne Brothers albums had gradually included additional non-standard elements to their bluegrass, including pedal steel guitars, pianos, and string sections; the brothers had amplified their instruments for larger live performances, with Sonny Osborne padlocking his resonator "to keep the details of his pickup a secret"; and Sonny Osborne had patented a six-string banjo. Sonny and Bobby defended themselves in Bluegrass Unlimited, saying they were trying to broaden the sensibilities of bluegrass music, while also trying to find a place for bluegrass music in contemporary pop culture.

In the early 1970s, the two performed while traveling 291,000 miles (468,000 km) in 26 months. In 1971, they won the Country Music Association Award for Vocal Group of the Year; two years later they were the first bluegrass group to perform at the White House.

Osborne was a member of the Grand Ole Opry (1964) and inductee to the Bluegrass Music Hall of Fame (1994). After retiring in 2005 due to rotator cuff surgery, Osborne wrote a regular column for Bluegrass Today and continued to correspond with fans. At the time of his death, Osborne was signed with Compass Records.

=== Style ===
Osborne credited Earl Scruggs with much of his base banjo technique, though he eventually incorporated "steel licks, piano licks, and horns and anything I can hear." By the late 1970s, he eschewed melodic licks, saying that though chromatics must be an easier technique than those he learned, they were disadvantaging young players.

Alongside his brother, Osborne was the driving force behind their electrifying bluegrass instruments, creating banjo licks cribbed from other genres, "and completely reinventing bluegrass harmonies with the famous stacked trio vocals."

=== Writing credits ===
- "Sunny Mountain Chimes" (1952, Gateway)
