= Southern Flavor =

Studio album by Bill Monroe
- Released: 1988
- Genre: Bluegrass music
- Label: MCA

Professional ratings
Review scores
| Source | Rating |
|---|---|
| Allmusic | 3/5 stars |

Southern Flavor is the eighteenth studio album by Bill Monroe, released through MCA Records in 1988. In 1989, the album won Monroe the Grammy Award for Best Bluegrass Recording (Vocal or Instrumental), an award currently known as Best Bluegrass Album.

== Track listing ==
1. "Stone Coal" (Monroe)
2. "Life's Highway" (Bobby Smith)
3. "What a Wonderful Life" (Raymond Huffmaster)
4. "Texas Lone Star" (Monroe)
5. "Give Me Wings" (Gerald Evans)
6. "Sugar Loaf Mountain" (Monroe)
7. "White Rose" (Carl Butler)
8. "Days Gone By" (Monroe)
9. "Southern Flavor" (Monroe)
10. "Take Courage Un' Tomorrow" (Traditional, arr. Monroe)

== Personnel ==
- Bill Monroe – mandolin, tenor vocals, lead vocal on "White Rose"
- Tom Ewing - acoustic guitar, lead vocals
- Blake Williams - banjo, baritone vocals
- Clarence "Tater" Tate - acoustic bass, bass vocals
- Bobby Hicks - fiddle
- Buddy Spicher - fiddle
- Mike Feagan - fiddle
- Emory Gordy, Jr. - acoustic bass on "What A Wonderful Life", "Give Me Wings" and "Take Courage Un' Tomorrow"

Art Direction: Simon Levy

Design: Katherine DeVault Design

Photography: Jim DeVault
