= Thousandsticks Branch =

Stream in Leslie County, Kentucky, U.S.

Coordinates: 37.185092°N 83.425462°W

Thousandsticks Branch is a stream in Leslie County, Kentucky, in the United States.

Thousandsticks Branch was named from the fact pioneers saw hundreds of tree stumps there like sticks.

== See also ==
- List of rivers of Kentucky
