= Good Thing Going =

Album by Rhonda Vincent

Studio album by Rhonda Vincent
- Released: January 8, 2008
- Recorded: 2007
- Genre: Country, bluegrass
- Length: 40:04
- Label: Rounder
- Producer: Darrin Vincent, Rhonda Vincent

Rhonda Vincent chronology
All American Bluegrass Girl (2006)	Good Thing Going (2008)	Destination Life (2009)

Good Thing Going is the 12th studio album released by Rhonda Vincent. The album was released on January 8, 2008, via Rounder Records. It was her third number-one album on the Top Bluegrass Albums chart, and her second Top 40 album on the Top Country Albums chart.

The album features an appearance by singer Keith Urban, who sings harmony vocals on "The Water Is Wide". Two singles, "I'm Leavin'" and "I Gotta Start Somewhere", were released, however, neither one charted.

== Critical reception ==
Professional ratings
Review scores
Source	Rating
AllMusic	4/5 stars
Slant Magazine	3/5 stars
American Songwriter	4/5 stars
My Kind of Country	A−

Rick Anderson of Allmusic said: "Good Thing Going finds Vincent bringing all of those styles together to create a very solid and enjoyable program." He also said the album is "very highly recommended".

Jonathan Keefe of Slant Magazine gives the album 3 out of a possible 5 stars and writes, "What distinguishes Vincent from the artist to whom she’s most frequently compared, Alison Krauss, is her aggressive vocals; perhaps more so than any contemporary country singer, Vincent’s power and phrasing recall the great Connie Smith."

Lizza Connor Bowen of American Songwriter gives the album 4 stars and writes, "Seven is certainly Rhonda Vincent’s lucky number. This seven-time International Bluegrass Association female vocalist bowed her seventh Rounder album, Good Thing Going, this January. As the title implies, it’s a testament to why she remains the reigning empress of bluegrass."

My Kind of Country's Razor X gives the album an A− and says, "Good Thing Going is a more eclectic set of songs than we’d heard to date from Rhonda, with elements of traditional folk, Western swing and contemporary country offered up alongside the standard bluegrass."

Exclaim!'s Kerry Doole reviews the album and writes, "Her purity of tone and phrasing are impeccable, and there's a pleasing variety to the material, from slow, hurtin? songs like "Scorn of A Lover? to jaunty romp "Hit Parade Of Love."

== Track listing ==
No.	Title	Writer(s)	Length
1.	"I'm Leavin'"	Rhonda Vincent	3:13
2.	"World's Biggest Fool"	Darrell Hayes, Morgane Hayes, Byron Hill	3:33
3.	"I Give All My Love to You" (with Russell Moore)	Vincent	3:30
4.	"Good Thing Going"	Vincent	3:07
5.	"Scorn of a Lover"	Vincent	3:09
6.	"Hit Parade of Love"	Jimmy Martin	2:24
7.	"I Will See You Again"	Vincent	4:19
8.	"Just One of a Kind"	Dottie Rambo	2:59
9.	"I Gotta Start Somewhere"	Jerry Salley, Lisa Shaffer	3:35
10.	"Who's Cryin' Baby"	Vincent	3:05
11.	"The Water Is Wide" (with Keith Urban)	Traditional	3:05
12.	"Bluegrass Saturday Night"	Vincent	3:08
Total length:			40:04

== Personnel ==
- Hunter Berry – fiddle, mandolin
- Kathy Chiavola – backing vocals
- Stuart Duncan – fiddle
- Kevin "Swine" Grantt – upright bass
- Daniel Grindstaff – 5 string dobro
- Andy Hall – resonator guitar
- Becky Isaacs Bowman – backing vocals
- Andy Leftwich – mandolin
- Jesse McReynolds – mandolin
- Russell Moore – backing vocals on "I Give All My Love to You"
- Tom Roady – percussion
- Adam Steffey – mandolin
- Ron Stewart – banjo
- Bryan Sutton – acoustic guitar
- Keith Urban – duet vocals on "The Water is Wide"
- Darrin Vincent – double bass, backing vocals
- Rhonda Vincent – mandolin, vocals
- Josh Williams – acoustic guitar, mandolin, backing vocals

== Chart performance ==
Chart (2008)	Peak position
US Top Bluegrass Albums (Billboard)	1
US Top Country Albums (Billboard)	35
US Heatseekers Albums (Billboard)	5
