= Hyden, Kentucky =

- City
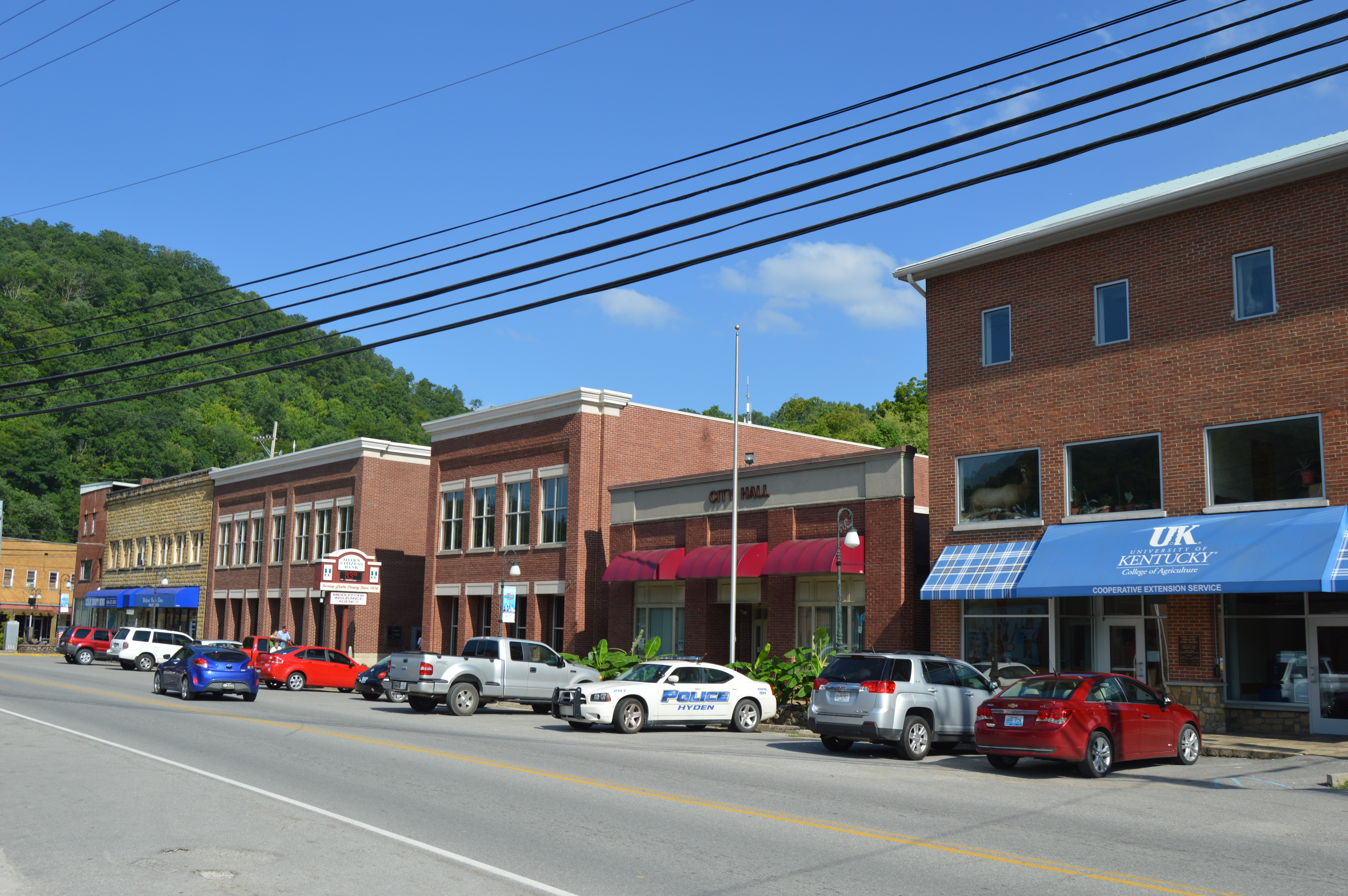
- Main Street
- Nickname: Redbud Capital of the World
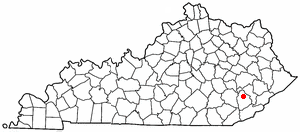
- Location of Hyden, Kentucky
- Coordinates: 37°9′48″N 83°22′30″W
- Country: United States
- State: Kentucky
- County: Leslie
- Incorporated: March 18, 1882

Government
  - Type: City Commission
  - Mayor: Carol Lewis Joseph

Area
  - Total: 1.34 sq mi (3.46 km^{2})
  - Land: 1.30 sq mi (3.36 km^{2})
  - Water: 0.039 sq mi (0.10 km^{2})
- Elevation: 922 ft (281 m)

Population (2020)
  - Total: 303
  - Density: 233.8/sq mi (90.27/km^{2})
- Time zone: UTC-5 (Eastern (EST))
  - Summer (DST): UTC-4 (EDT)
- ZIP codes: 41749, 41762
- Area code: 606
- FIPS code: 21-38908
- GNIS feature ID: 0512880
- Website: www.cityofhyden.com

Hyden is a home rule-class city in and the county seat of Leslie County, Kentucky, United States. As of the 2020 census, Hyden had a population of 303. It is located at the junction of U.S. Route 421 and Kentucky Route 80, along the Middle Fork of the Kentucky River.

== History ==
The area was first settled around 1800 by the Sizemores, a mixed-blood (Anglo and Native-American) family migrating from North Carolina, with a brief stay in Hawkins County, Tennessee, before making it to Kentucky. John "Rock House" Sizemore and his wife, Nancy (Bowling) Sizemore, lived in a rock house about a hundred yards up from the mouth of the creek which would later bear his name (Rockhouse Creek). John Rock House later sold the land to a Lewis man who then donated the land to the government, which became the town of Hyden. The town was established in 1878 and incorporated in 1882, and was named after John Hyden, a state senator of the time who helped form Leslie County. The mountainous terrain made the region difficult to access except by river, which was no longer the dominant form of transportation by the late 19th century, hindering growth.

Frontier Nursing University opened in Hyden in 1939.

Hyden briefly came to national attention when the Hurricane Creek mine disaster occurred in late 1970, 5 miles (8 km) southeast of the city.

In July 1978, Richard Nixon came to Hyden to make his first public speech since resigning from the presidency during the Watergate crisis. Hyden was picked because Judge-Executive C. Allen Muncy wrote a letter inviting him to attend the dedication of a recreation facility and Nixon wanted a town that had heavily supported his presidential runs. Leslie County Judge-Executive C. Allen Muncy claimed the Nixon invitation prompted the U.S. Department of Justice to obtain indictments of him and his associates on vote-fraud charges; while on appeal for his conviction, he won renomination in the Republican primary but lost the 1981 general election to independent Kermit Keen.

== Geography ==
Hyden is located in north-central Leslie County at 37°9′48″N 83°22′30″W (37.163456, -83.375065), in the valley of the Middle Fork of the Kentucky River. Most of the city is on the west side of the river, at the confluence of Rockhouse Creek from the west.

U.S. Route 421 and Kentucky Route 80 pass through Hyden as its Main Street, leading west 31 miles (50 km) to Manchester. In the other direction, US 421 leads south up the Middle Fork valley and over Pine Mountain 34 miles (55 km) to Harlan, while KY 80 leads northeast 17 miles (27 km) to Combs, near Hazard. Kentucky Route 118 (Tim Couch Pass) is a three-lane highway leading northwest from Hyden 4 miles (6 km) to the Hal Rogers Parkway at Thousandsticks. Kentucky Route 257 (Dryhill Road) is a local road that leads north from Hyden down the valley of the Middle Fork 11 miles (18 km) to Confluence.

According to the United States Census Bureau, Hyden has a total area of 1.4 square miles (3.5 km^{2}), of which 0.04 square miles (0.1 km^{2}), or 2.99%, are water.

=== Climate ===
The climate in this area is characterized by hot, humid summers and generally mild to cool winters. According to the Köppen Climate Classification system, Hyden has a humid subtropical climate, abbreviated "Cfa" on climate maps.

== Demographics ==
Historical population
Census	Pop.	Note	%±
1890	80		—
1900	269		236.3%
1910	316		17.5%
1920	313		−0.9%
1950	647		—
1960	348		−46.2%
1970	482		38.5%
1980	488		1.2%
1990	375		−23.2%
2000	204		−45.6%
2010	365		78.9%
2020	303		−17.0%
U.S. Decennial Census

As of the census of 2000, there were 204 people, 95 households, and 58 families residing in the city. The population density was 256.0 inhabitants per square mile (98.8/km^{2}). There were 112 housing units at an average density of 140.6 per square mile (54.3/km^{2}). The racial makeup of the city was 99.51% White and 0.49% Native American. Hispanic or Latino of any race were 0.98% of the population.

There were 95 households, out of which 18.9% had children under the age of 18 living with them, 41.1% were married couples living together, 15.8% had a female householder with no husband present, and 38.9% were non-families. 36.8% of all households were made up of individuals, and 21.1% had someone living alone who was 65 years of age or older. The average household size was 2.07 and the average family size was 2.69.

In the city, the population was spread out, with 15.7% under the age of 18, 10.3% from 18 to 24, 20.6% from 25 to 44, 27.9% from 45 to 64, and 25.5% who were 65 years of age or older. The median age was 48 years. For every 100 females, there were 74.4 males. For every 100 females age 18 and over, there were 68.6 males.

The median income for a household in the city was $26,429, and the median income for a family was $32,500. Males had a median income of $24,792 versus $31,250 for females. The per capita income for the city was $13,966. About 3.2% of families and 10.5% of the population were below the poverty line, including none of those under the age of eighteen and 24.4% of those 65 or over.

== Education ==
Hyden has a lending library, the Leslie County Public Library.

== Notable people ==
- Leila Feltner Begley, secretary of state of Kentucky from 1970 to 1971
- Mary Carson Breckinridge, founder of the first nurse midwifery school in the United States and champion of rural public health
- Tim Couch, NFL quarterback
- John Hensley, actor
- Ken Keen, lieutenant general, former Military Deputy Commander of United States Southern Command
- James E. Morgan, basketball player and race horse trainer
- C. Wesley Morgan, businessman and Kentucky state legislator
- The Osborne Brothers, bluegrass musicians
- Betty Jean Robinson, gospel singer
- Willie Sandlin, World War I Medal of Honor recipient
