= Rhonda Vincent =

American bluegrass singer

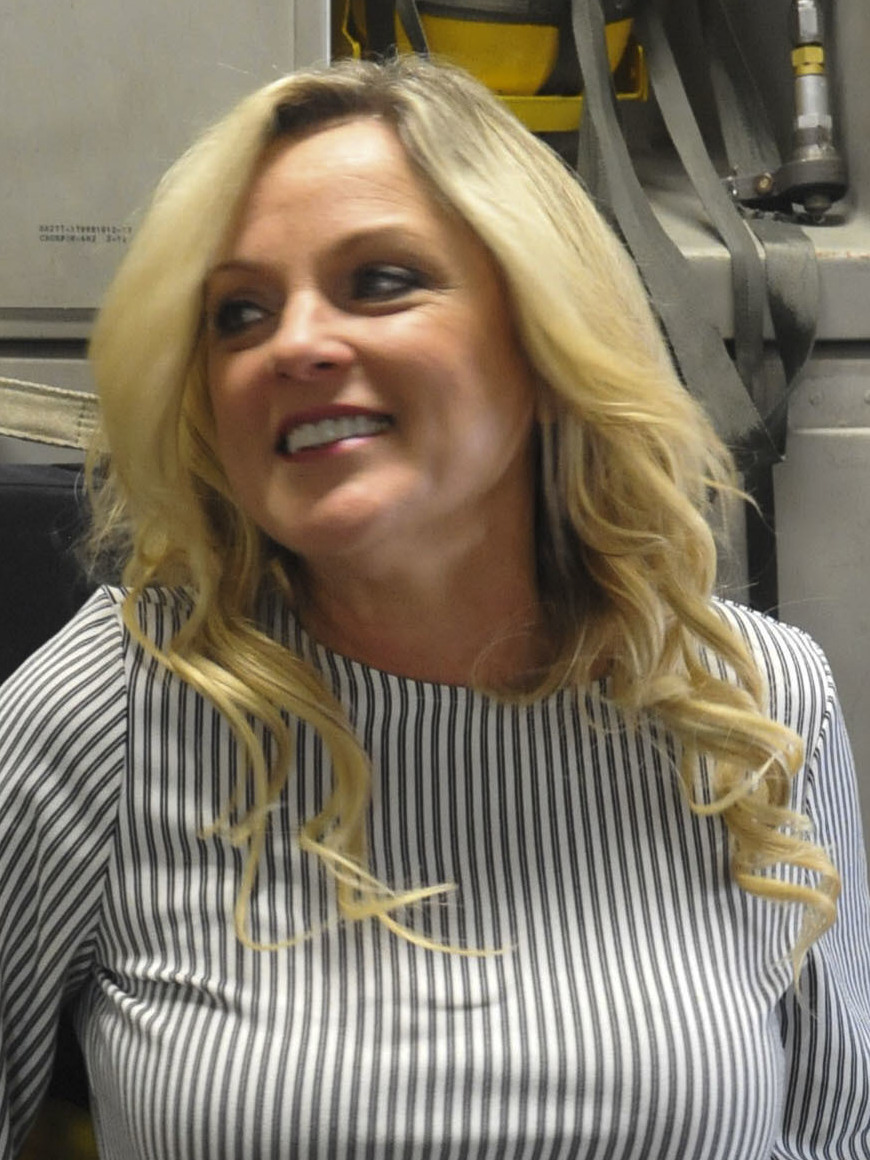
- Vincent in 2019

Background information
- Born: July 13, 1962 (age 64)
- Origin: Greentop, Missouri, U.S.
- Genres: Bluegrass; country; gospel
- Occupations: Musician; songwriter
- Instruments: Vocals; mandolin; guitar; fiddle; banjo
- Years active: 1970–present
- Labels: Rebel; Giant; Rounder; Upper Management Music
- Member of: Rhonda Vincent & The Rage
- Spouse: Herb Sandker (m. 1983; div. 2024)
- Website: Official website

Rhonda Lea Vincent (born July 13, 1962) is an American bluegrass singer, songwriter, and multi-instrumentalist.

Vincent's music career began when she was a child in her family's band, the Sally Mountain Show, and it has spanned more than four decades. Vincent first achieved success in the bluegrass genre in the 1970s and 1980s, earning the respect of her mostly male peers for her mastery of the progressive chord structures and multirange, fast-paced vocals intrinsic to bluegrass music. In media, Vincent has been dubbed the "Queen of Bluegrass" by several sources. Vincent is an in-demand guest vocalist for other bluegrass and country music performers, appearing on recordings by Dolly Parton, Alan Jackson, Tanya Tucker, Joe Diffie, Faith Hill, and other notables.

Vincent is an eight-time Grammy nominee, winning the Grammy Award for Best Bluegrass Album in 2017. In 2020, she was inducted as a member of the Grand Ole Opry.

== Early years ==
Vincent was born in Kirksville, Missouri, on July 13, 1962, and raised in nearby Greentop, Missouri. She is the oldest of three children, and the only daughter of Johnny and Carolyn Vincent. Her brother Darrin is a member of the award-winning bluegrass group Dailey & Vincent. Her youngest brother Brian played with the family group, but is now a top executive with the Bimeda Corporation. A fifth-generation musician, Rhonda's musical career started at age five when she sang gospel songs with her family's band, which was later known as the Sally Mountain Show. Her father bought her a snare drum for her sixth birthday. At age eight, Vincent started playing mandolin. She later added fiddle to her list of instruments at 12. In an interview with Ingrams magazine, she said, "Dad used to pick me up after school, and Grandpa would come over and we played until after dinner almost every night. There wasn’t a lot going on in Greentop, but it was always hopping at the Vincent house." Vincent recorded her first single, a version of "Mule Skinner Blues", in 1970. The family, including her younger brothers when they were old enough to play instruments, traveled and performed extensively across the Midwest in the 1970s and early 1980s. Except for living in Texas for a short time in 1974, and two summers (1977, 1978) spent employed as musicians at Silver Dollar City in Branson, Missouri, the Vincent family used the Greentop area as home base. The Vincent children all attended Schuyler County R-1 schools, and following high school, Vincent later attended Northeast Missouri State University, majoring in accounting.

== Solo career ==
Vincent’s life of music evolved into a successful career in bluegrass music after being discovered by Grand Ole Opry star Jim Ed Brown and later spending what she calls her musical college years recording for Giant Records. She learned about the music business from Nashville’s best, such as James Stroud, Jack McFadden, and Stan Barnett. Even while Vincent was still performing regularly with the Sally Mountain Show, she released her first solo album New Dreams and Sunshine in 1988. In 1985, Vincent had competed in the TV series You Can Be a Star on the original version of the Nashville Network. After winning the competition, she was signed to a recording contract; her first professional performance was with country singer and Grand Ole Opry star Jim Ed Brown. In the 1990s, Vincent branched out into mainstream country music, releasing two albums on the Giant Records label, but did not have success there.

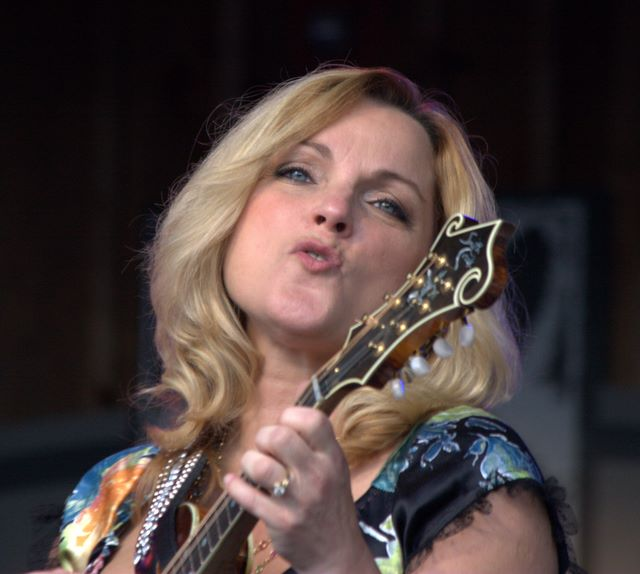
Rhonda Vincent on the Watson Stage, MerleFest, 2010

With the release of her album Back Home Again in 2000, Vincent returned to bluegrass with the goal of expanding both the musical reach and the accessibility of the genre. The International Bluegrass Music Association (IBMA) accorded her its Female Vocalist of the Year award for the years 2000 – 2006, plus IBMA Entertainer of the Year in 2001. The Society for Preservation of Bluegrass Music in America designated her its Entertainer of the Year for 2002 – 2006 inclusive. She also performs with her band, Rhonda Vincent and the Rage.

On February 19, 2010, Vincent left Rounder Records after 10 years with the label. Vincent released Taken, her debut album on her own label Upper Management Music on September 21, 2010. Featuring special guests including long-time friend Dolly Parton, Richard Marx, and Little Roy Lewis, the album entered the Top Bluegrass Albums chart at number one.

On June 7, 2011, Vincent and Gene Watson released a duet album on Upper Management entitled Your Money and My Good Looks. The album entered the U.S. Billboard Top Country Albums chart at number 71.

Sunday Mornin' Singin', an album of old-time gospel standards, was released on July 10, 2012.

On April 1, 2017, Vincent's duet with a fellow country singer Richard Lynch was released as a track on Lynch's album Mending Fences.

During an appearance on the Grand Ole Opry on April 27, Vincent announced that Daryle Singletary and she had spent the previous months recording a duets album, with further details to follow during CMA week. She then introduced Singletary and the two performed a couple of George Jones and Tammy Wynette songs – "Golden Ring" and "One".

Her pivotal bluegrass album, Back Home Again on Rounder Records, transformed Vincent into the All-American Bluegrass Girl. She was crowned the New Queen of Bluegrass by The Wall Street Journal in 2000. She is a multiple-award winner, with a 2017 Grammy for Best Bluegrass Album, an Entertainer of the Year 2001, Song of the Year 2004, and unprecedented seven consecutive Female Vocalist of the Year awards from the International Bluegrass Music Association 2000–2006.

Her powerful vocal style transcends the boundaries of bluegrass music, as evidenced in her collaboration with Dolly Parton on the Elton John/Bernie Taupin Tribute Project “Restoration” 2018. She was invited to become a member of the Grand Ole Opry on February 28, 2020.

=== Touring ===
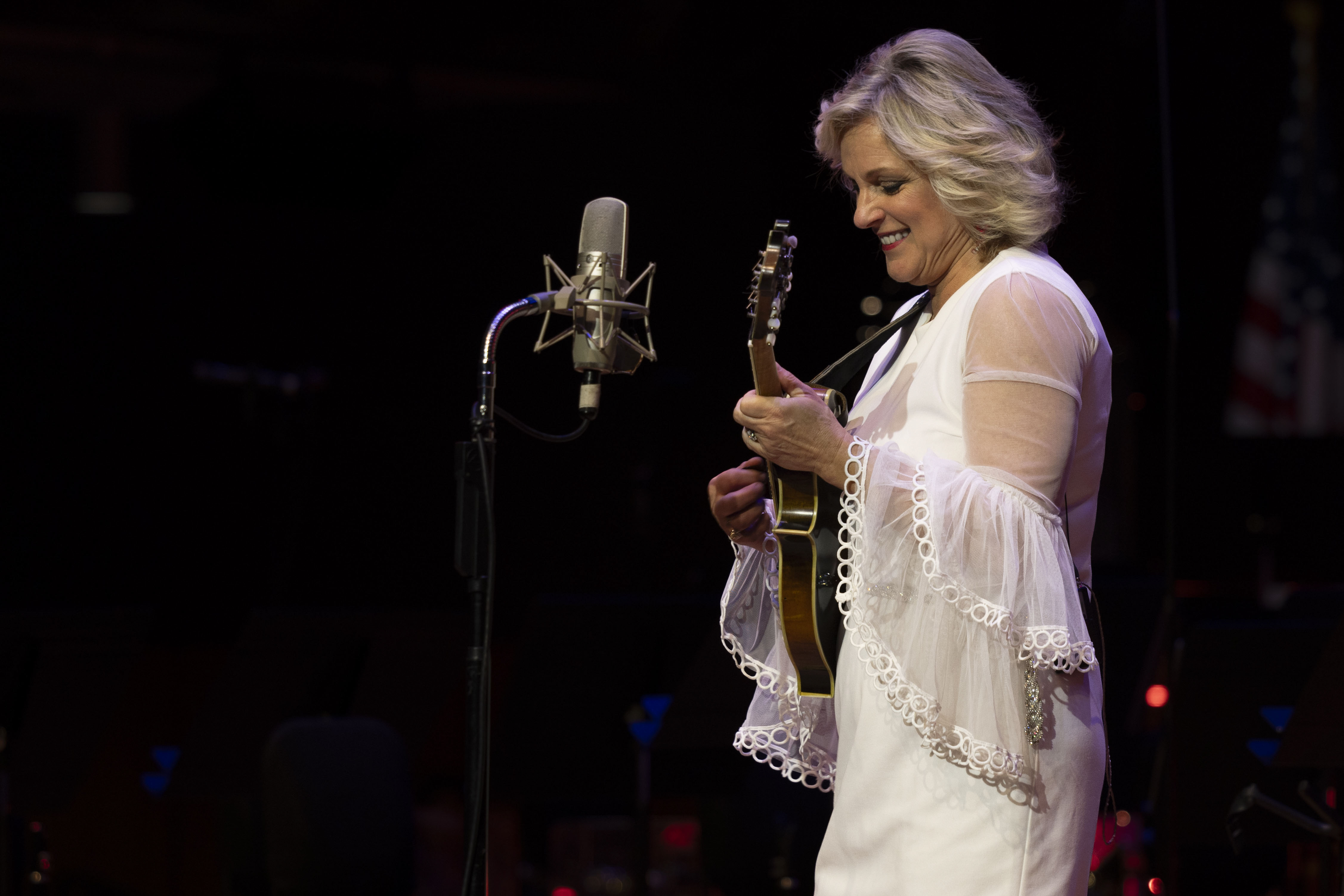
Vincent performing at Temple University in 2025

In 2008, Vincent's band performed at Centennial Hall in London, Ontario, at a concert organized by the Thames Valley Bluegrass Association.

=== Gospel DVD ===
In a 2011 interview with television station KTVO, Vincent announced that her band and she had recently filmed a live all-gospel DVD at a church in her hometown of Greentop, Missouri. The DVD was expected to be released sometime in 2012.

== Family life ==
Vincent married Herb Sandker on Christmas Eve 1983. While it might have been more convenient to be based out of someplace like Nashville, Vincent chose to remain close to her Missouri roots: "My husband and I made the decision early on. I loved being in my home area. My parents are there, our relatives are there. We wanted to raise our children there. So I made the decision to commute." For a period of time in the late 1990s and early 2000s, they owned, and Sandker managed, a popular restaurant in Kirksville, Missouri, called Bogies.

Vincent's elder daughter Sally wed her mother's fiddle player, Hunter Berry, in Greentop, Missouri, in 2010. Younger daughter Tensel married her mother's dobro player, Brent Burke, in 2013. Sally and Tensel have since performed with their mother, and have begun their own group with their husbands named Next Best Thing.

Since 1987, Rhonda and the entire Vincent family have hosted a large yearly bluegrass festival on land just west of Queen City, Missouri. The Sally Mountain Bluegrass Festival is traditionally held around July 4, and attracts music fans from across the U.S. and the world.

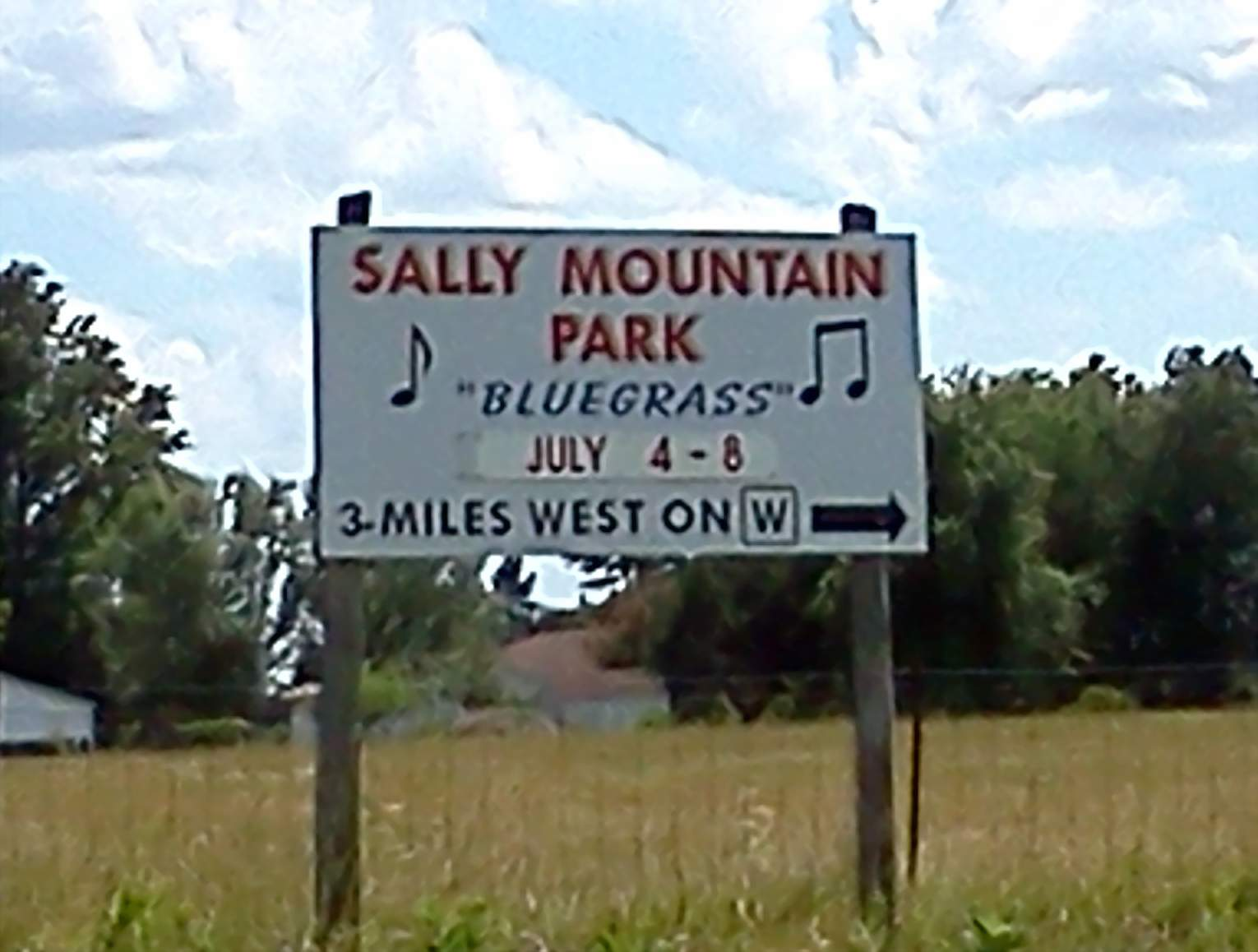
A highway sign in Queen City, Missouri directing attendees to the annual Sally Mountain Bluegrass Festival

== Discography ==
Solo studio albums

- New Dreams and Sunshine (1988)
- A Dream Come True (1990)
- Timeless and True Love (1991)
- Written in the Stars (1993)
- Trouble Free (1996)
- Back Home Again (2000)
- The Storm Still Rages (2001)
- One Step Ahead (2003)
- All American Bluegrass Girl (2006)
- Beautiful: A Christmas Collection (2006)
- Good Thing Going (2008)
- Destination Life (2009)
- Taken (2010)
- The House with the Red Light: A Discovery of Faith (2013)
- Only Me (2014)
- Christmas Time (2015)
- Music Is What I See (2021)
- Destinations and Fun Places (2024)
- A Possibility (2026)

Collaborative studio albums

- Bound for Gloryland (with The Sally Mountain Show) (1991)
- Your Money and My Good Looks (with Gene Watson) (2011)
- American Grandstand (with Daryle Singletary) (2017)

Live albums

- Ragin' Live (2005)
- Sunday Mornin' Singin' Live (2012)
- All the Rage: In Concert, Volume One (2016)
- Live at the Ryman (2018)

== Awards ==
To date, Vincent and her band, The Rage, have won one Grammy, nineteen IBMA Awards (including the top Entertainer of the Year honor in 2001 and consecutive Female Vocalist of the year wins between 2000 and 2006) and eighty nine SPBGMA Awards.

Year	Association	Category	Nominated work	Result
1974	Society for the Preservation of Bluegrass Music of America	Single of the Year	Muleskinner Blues	Won
1999	International Bluegrass Music Association	Recorded Event of the Year	Clinch Mountain Country	Won
2000	International Bluegrass Music Association	Female Vocalist of the Year	Rhonda Vincent	Won
2001	International Bluegrass Music Association	Female Vocalist of the Year	Rhonda Vincent	Won
2001	International Bluegrass Music Association	Recorded Event of the Year	Follow Me Back to the Fold: A Tribute to Women in Bluegrass	Won
2001	International Bluegrass Music Association	Entertainer of the Year	Rhonda Vincent & The Rage	Won
2002	International Bluegrass Music Association	Female Vocalist of the Year	Rhonda Vincent	Won
2003	International Bluegrass Music Association	Female Vocalist of the Year	Rhonda Vincent	Won
2004	International Bluegrass Music Association	Song of the Year	Kentucky Borderline	Won
2004	International Bluegrass Music Association	Recorded Event of the Year	Livin', Lovin', Losin': Songs of the Louvin Brothers	Won
2004	International Bluegrass Music Association	Female Vocalist of the Year	Rhonda Vincent	Won
2004	Grammy Awards	Best Bluegrass Album	One Step Ahead	Nominated
2005	International Bluegrass Music Association	Female Vocalist of the Year	Rhonda Vincent	Won
2006	Grammy Awards	Best Bluegrass Album	Ragin' Live	Nominated
2006	International Bluegrass Music Association	Female Vocalist of the Year	Rhonda Vincent	Won
2007	Grammy Awards	Best Bluegrass Album	All American Bluegrass Girl	Nominated
2007	Grammy Awards	Best Country Collaboration with Vocals	Midnight Angel (with Bobby Osborne)	Nominated
2010	Society for the Preservation of Bluegrass Music of America	Entertainer of the Year	Rhonda Vincent	Won
2010	Grammy Awards	Best Bluegrass Album	Destination Life	Nominated
2011	Society for the Preservation of Bluegrass Music of America	Entertainer of the Year	Rhonda Vincent	Won
2012	Society for the Preservation of Bluegrass Music of America	Contemporary Female Vocalist of the Year	Rhonda Vincent	Won
2012	Society for the Preservation of Bluegrass Music of America	Vocal Group of the Year	Rhonda Vincent & The Rage	Nominated
2012	Society for the Preservation of Bluegrass Music of America	Bluegrass Band of the Year	Rhonda Vincent & The Rage	Nominated
2012	Society for the Preservation of Bluegrass Music of America	Song of the Year	The Court of Love	Nominated
2013	Society for the Preservation of Bluegrass Music of America	Entertainer of the Year	Rhonda Vincent	Nominated
2013	Society for the Preservation of Bluegrass Music of America	Contemporary Female Vocalist of the Year	Rhonda Vincent	Won
2013	Society for the Preservation of Bluegrass Music of America	Bluegrass Hall of Greats	Rhonda Vincent	Won
2013	Society for the Preservation of Bluegrass Music of America	Bluegrass Album of the Year	Sunday Morning Signin'	Nominated
2013	Society for the Preservation of Bluegrass Music of America	Instrumental Group of the Year	Rhonda Vincent & The Rage	Nominated
2014	Society for the Preservation of Bluegrass Music of America	Bluegrass Hall of Greats	Rhonda Vincent	Inducted
2014	Society for the Preservation of Bluegrass Music of America	Instrumental Group of the Year	Rhonda Vincent & The Rage	Won
2014	Society for the Preservation of Bluegrass Music of America	Entertainer of the Year	Rhonda Vincent	Won
2015	Society for the Preservation of Bluegrass Music of America	Contemporary Female Vocalist of the Year	Rhonda Vincent	Won
2015	Society for the Preservation of Bluegrass Music of America	Bluegrass Band of the Year	Rhonda Vincent & The Rage	Won
2015	Society for the Preservation of Bluegrass Music of America	Entertainer of the Year	Rhonda Vincent	Won
2015	Grammy Awards	Best Bluegrass Album	Only Me	Nominated
2015	International Bluegrass Music Association	Female Vocalist of the Year	Rhonda Vincent	Won
2016	Society for the Preservation of Bluegrass Music of America	Entertainer of the Year	Rhonda Vincent	Won
2016	Society for the Preservation of Bluegrass Music of America	Female Vocalist of the Year	Rhonda Vincent	Won
2016	Society for the Preservation of Bluegrass Music of America	Instrumental Group of the Year	Rhonda Vincent & The Rage	Won
2018	Grammy Awards	Best Bluegrass Album	All The Rage: Volume One	Won
2022	Grammy Awards	Best Bluegrass Album	Music Is What I See	Nominated

== Other honors ==
- Missouri Walk of Fame 2012 inductee
- Bluegrass Star Award, Inaugural Recipient (October 16, 2010), presented by the Bluegrass Heritage Foundation of Dallas Texas. The award is bestowed upon bluegrass artists who do an exemplary job of advancing traditional bluegrass music and bringing it to new audiences while preserving its character and heritage.
- Champion, Celebrity Division, National Cornbread Festival cookoff. Rhonda and husband Herb are the previous owners and operators of a popular restaurant in Kirksville, Missouri.
- Missouri Music Hall of Fame 2017 inductee
- Member of the Grand Ole Opry
