= Osborne Brothers =

American bluegrass band

- Origin: Hyden, Kentucky, U.S.
- Genre: Bluegrass
- Years active: 1953–2005
- Labels: MGM, Decca, MCA, CMH, RCA, Pinecastle Records
- Past members: Bobby Osborne; Sonny Osborne

The Osborne Brothers, Sonny (October 29, 1937 – October 24, 2021) and Bobby (December 7, 1931 – June 27, 2023), were an influential and popular bluegrass act during the 1960s and 1970s and until Sonny retired in 2005. They are probably best known for their No. 33 1967 country hit song, "Rocky Top", written by Felice and Boudleaux Bryant and named after a Tennessee location.

== Biography ==
The Osbornes were born in Roark, Kentucky, on Jack's Creek, but the family moved to Hyden after their house burned down. The family later moved near Dayton, Ohio, where the brothers grew up and performed as entertainers in southwestern Ohio. In 1952, during the Korean War, Bobby served in the United States Marine Corps. Sonny went to work with the "Father of Bluegrass Music" Bill Monroe. Following Bobby's discharge, the Osbornes teamed up with Jimmy Martin, performing at radio stations WROL in Knoxville, Tennessee and WJR in Detroit, Michigan. At their only session together, on November 16, 1954, the Osbornes and Martin recorded six songs for RCA Victor. In late 1955, the Osbornes left Martin and moved to Wheeling, West Virginia, where they performed on WWVA Jamboree until Christmas, together with Charlie Bailey. They returned to Dayton in early 1956 playing the local clubs with guitarist Enos Johnson. When Johnson left, the Osbornes added guitarist Red Allen and fiddler Art Stamper to form a new group.

The Osborne Brothers and Red Allen (under the pseudonym Stanley Alpine) recorded for Gateway Records in February or March 1956 cutting eight instrumentals. In the spring of 1956, Tommy Sutton, a local disc jockey, helped the Osborne Brothers get a recording contract with MGM Records. The new group, with the Osbornes on banjo and mandolin, Allen on guitar, Ernie Newton on bass, Tommy Jackson and Art Stamper on fiddles, made their MGM recording debut on July 1, 1956. Their first released 45 RPM single for MGM containing "Ruby Are You Mad" became a huge success and led to the Osbornes being signed on as regular members of the WWVA Jamboree in October 1956. The "Jamboree version" of the group comprised Ricky Russell on dobro, Johnny Dacus on fiddle and Ray Anderson on bass. "Ruby Are You Mad" marks the first time twin banjos were used on a bluegrass recording. On October 17, 1957, at their third session for MGM, the Osbornes, always experimenting with their sound, added a dobro and drums, also for the first time on a bluegrass recording. In April 1958, Red Allen, who was the last musician to receive billing next to the Osborne Brothers, left the group.

Upon their breaking into the bluegrass scene, the Osborne Brothers quickly became known for their virtuoso instrumentation and tight, melodic vocal harmonies. They first made the country chart in 1958 with "Once More", performing as a trio with Red Allen. The song featured a novel inverted stacked harmony. Bobby sang the lead line highest, with Sonny singing baritone, and the third singer (Red Allen) singing tenor as the lowest part. This made Bobby's distinctive voice the lead, and the third voice was somewhat interchangeable. As a result, they could hire others guitarist and singers without changing the overall sound. The "high lead" vocal trio became their signature, and they used to great effect in the country market with songs like "Blame Me", "Sweethearts Again", and a remake of the Carter Family's "Fair and Tender Ladies".

During the 1960s, the Osbornes caused minor controversy among Bluegrass music purists by incorporating electronic and percussion instruments in their live acts and studio work. In 1960 they became the first bluegrass group to play on a college campus, performing at Antioch College. In 1963 they signed with Decca Records. On August 8, 1964, the Osborne Brothers were inducted as members of the Grand Ole Opry.

The Osborne Brothers recorded their hit “Rocky Top” in November 1967. Released on December 25, 1967, it sold 85,000 copies in only two weeks, and was named an official Tennessee state song in 1982. In 1973 the Osborne Brothers became the first bluegrass group to perform at the White House.

In 1994, The Osborne Brothers were inducted into the International Bluegrass Music Association's Hall of Honor.

In 2025, The Osborne Brothers were inducted into the Volunteer State Music Hall Of Fame.

== Hits ==
Their song "Ruby Are You Mad" came in 1956 after signing with MGM Records (1956) and began a string of hits through 1986. Among them were "Once More" (1958), "Up This Hill & Down" (1965), "Making Plans" (1965), "Rocky Top" (1967), "Tennessee Hound Dog" (1969), and "Midnight Flyer" (1972). The Osborne Brothers' final chart appearance came in late 1986 with a new version of "Rocky Top".

== Later years and deaths ==
Bobby continued to perform with his band Rocky Top X-press, which includes two of his three sons. They performed May 31, 2013, at the rededication marking new ownership of The Gatlinburg Inn, where Boudleaux and Felice Bryant wrote "Rocky Top," and the couple's sons, Dane and Del Bryant, were on hand. Bobby died in 2023.

Sonny retired in 2005 and died in 2021.

== Notable band members ==
- Johnathan Smith, Organ/Keys
- Red Allen, guitar
- Benny Birchfield, guitar/banjo
- Paul Brewster, guitar
- Jimmy D. Brock, bass
- Grady Martin, guitar
- Shawn Camp, fiddle
- Jimmy Campbell, fiddle
- Shad Cobb, fiddle
- Donnie Collins, guitar
- David Crow, fiddle
- Derek Deakins, fiddle
- Dennis Digby, bass
- Glen Duncan, fiddle
- Boyce Edwards, fiddle
- Bill Edwards, guitar
- Terry Eldredge, bass/guitar
- Harley Gabbard, guitar
- Tim Graves, dobro
- Tommy Jackson, fiddle
- Ray Kirkland, bass
- Jimmy Martin, guitar
- Jimmy Mattingly, fiddle
- Daryl Mosley, bass
- Bobby Osborne, II, guitar/bass
- Robby Osborne, guitar/bass/drums
- Wynn Osborne, banjo
- Ronnie Reno, guitar/bass
- Dale Sledd, guitar
- Terry Smith, bass
- Buddy Spicher, fiddle
- Blaine Sprouse, fiddle
- Steve Thomas, fiddle
- Gene Wooten, dobro
- Dana Cupp, Guitar, Banjo
- Tim Evans, bass

== Discography ==
=== Albums ===
Year	Album	US Country	Label		
1959	Country Pickin' and Hillside Singin'	—	MGM		
1959	1962	Blue Grass Music	MGM	—	MGM
Bluegrass Instrumentals	1962	—	MGM		MGM
1963	Cuttin' Grass Osborne Brothers Style	—			MGM
1965	Voices In Bluegrass	—	Decca		
1966	Up This Hill And Down	—	Decca		
1967	Modern Sounds Of Bluegrass Music	—	Decca		
1968	Yesterday, Today & the Osborne Brothers	34	Decca		
1969	Up to Date and Down to Earth	27	Decca		
1970	Ru-beeeee	44	Decca		
1971	The Osborne Brothers	31	Decca		
1971	Country Roads	45	Decca		
1972	Bobby and Sonny	44	Decca		
1973	Midnight Flyer	44	MCA		
1974	Fastest Grass Alive	40	MCA		
1975	Pickin' Grass and Singin' Country	30	MCA		
1976	Number One	—	CMH Records		
1977	From Rocky Top to Muddy Bottom	—	CMH Records		
1979	Bluegrass Concerto	—	CMH Records		
1979	The Essential Bluegrass Album (With Mac Wiseman)	—	CMH Records		
1980	I Can Hear Kentucky Calling Me	—	CMH Records		
1981	Bobby & His Mandolin	—	CMH Records		
1981	Hillbilly Fever	—	CMH Records		
1982	Bluegrass Spectacular	64	RCA		

=== Singles ===
Year	Single	US Country
1958	"Once More"	13
1966	"Up This Hill and Down"	41
1966	"The Kind of Woman I Got"	33
1967	"Roll Muddy River"	66
1967	"Rocky Top"	33
1968	"Cut the Cornbread, Mama"	60
1968	"Son of a Sawmill Man"	58
1969	"Tennessee Hound Dog"	28
1970	"Ruby, Are You Mad"	58
1970	"My Old Kentucky Home (Turpentine and Dandelion Wine)"	69
1971	"Georgia Pineywoods"	37
1971	"Muddy Bottom"	62
1973	"Midnight Flyer"	74
1973	"Lizzie Lou"	66
1973	"Blue Heartache"	64
1976	"Don't Let Smoky Mountain Smoke Get in Your Eyes"	86
1979	"Shackles and Chains" (with Mac Wiseman)	95
1980	"I Can Hear Kentucky Calling Me"	75
