= Bill Monroe =

American bluegrass musician, songwriter (1911–1996)

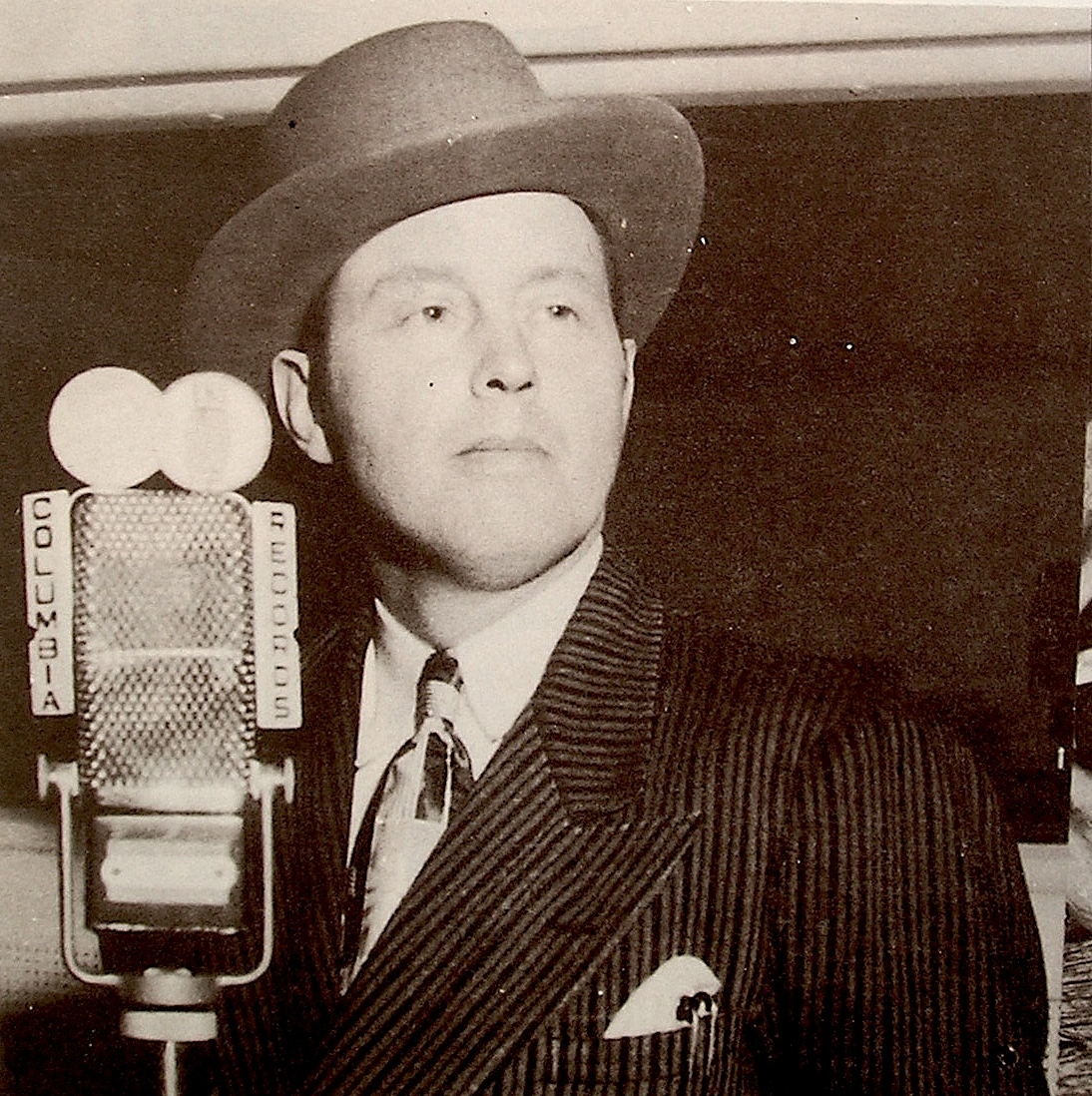
- Monroe promotional photo, 1952

Background information
- Born: William Smith Monroe; September 13, 1911; Rosine, Kentucky, U.S.
- Origin: Kentucky, U.S.
- Died: September 9, 1996 (aged 84) Springfield, Tennessee, U.S.
- Genres: Country; bluegrass; gospel; blues; folk
- Instruments: Mandolin, guitar
- Years active: 1927–1996
- Labels: Bluebird; Columbia; Decca; MCA; RCA Victor

William Smith Monroe (/mənˈroʊ/ mən-ROH; September 13, 1911 – September 9, 1996) was an American mandolinist, singer, and songwriter who created the bluegrass music genre. For this reason, he is often called the "Father of Bluegrass".

The genre takes its name from his band, the Blue Grass Boys, who named their group for the bluegrass of Monroe's home state of Kentucky. He described the genre as "Scottish bagpipes and ole-time fiddlin'. It's Methodist and Holiness and Baptist. It's blues and jazz, and it has a high lonesome sound."

== Early life ==
Monroe was born on his family's farm near Rosine, Kentucky, the youngest of eight children of James Buchanan "Buck" and Malissa (Vandiver) Monroe. His mother and her brother, James Pendleton "Pen" Vandiver, were both musically talented, and Monroe and his family grew up playing and singing at home.

Bill was of Scottish and English heritage. Because his older brothers Birch and Charlie already played the fiddle and guitar, Bill was resigned to playing the less desirable mandolin. He recalled that his brothers insisted that he remove four of the mandolin's eight strings so he would not play too loudly.

Monroe's mother died when he was ten, and his father died six years later. Eventually, his brothers and sisters moved away, leaving Monroe to bounce between uncles and aunts until finally settling in with his disabled uncle Pendleton Vandiver, whom he often accompanied when Vandiver played the fiddle at dances. This experience inspired one of Monroe's most famous compositions, "Uncle Pen", recorded in 1950, and the 1972 album Bill Monroe's Uncle Pen. On that album, Monroe recorded a number of traditional fiddle tunes he had often heard performed by Vandiver. Vandiver has been credited with giving Monroe "a repertoire of tunes that sank into Bill's aurally trained memory and a sense of rhythm that seeped into his bones."

Also significant in Monroe's musical life was Arnold Shultz, an influential fiddler and guitarist who introduced Monroe to the blues. In an interview with Ralph Rinzler, Monroe described the fiddling of Shultz as being infused with more blues than a white fiddler, although he would play common songs such as "Sally Goodin".

== Career ==
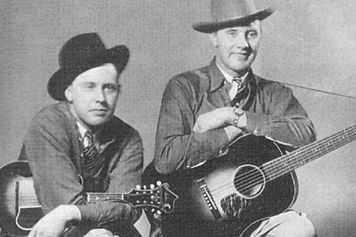
Bill Monroe (left) and his brother Charlie in 1936

In 1929, Monroe moved to Indiana to work at an oil refinery with his brothers Birch and Charlie. Together with a friend, Larry Moore, they formed the "Monroe Brothers", to play at local dances and house parties.

Birch and Moore soon left the group, and Bill and Charlie carried on as a duo, eventually winning spots performing live on radio stations, first in Indiana and then, sponsored by Texas Crystals, on several radio broadcasts in Shenandoah, Iowa, Nebraska, South Carolina and North Carolina from 1934 to 1936. RCA Victor signed the Monroe Brothers to a recording contract in 1936. They scored an immediate hit single with the gospel song "What Would You Give in Exchange For Your Soul?" and ultimately recorded 60 tracks for Victor's Bluebird label between 1936 and 1938.

After the Monroe Brothers disbanded in 1938, Bill Monroe formed The Kentuckians in Little Rock, Arkansas, but the group only lasted for three months. Monroe then left Little Rock for Atlanta, Georgia, to form the first edition of the Blue Grass Boys, with singer/guitarist Cleo Davis, fiddler Art Wooten, and bassist Amos Garren.

In October 1939, Monroe successfully auditioned for a regular spot on the Grand Ole Opry, impressing Opry founder George D. Hay with his energetic performance of Jimmie Rodgers's "Mule Skinner Blues". Monroe recorded that song, along with seven others, at his first solo recording session for RCA Victor in 1940; by this time, the Blue Grass Boys consisted of singer/guitarist Clyde Moody, fiddler Tommy Magness, and bassist Bill Wesbrooks.

While the fast tempos and instrumental virtuosity characteristic of bluegrass music are apparent even on these early tracks, Monroe was still experimenting with the sound of his group. He seldom sang lead vocals on his Victor recordings, often preferring to contribute high tenor harmonies as he had in the Monroe Brothers. A 1945 session for Columbia Records featured an accordion, soon dropped from the band. Most importantly, Monroe added banjo player David "Stringbean" Akeman to the Blue Grass Boys in 1942. Akeman played the instrument in a relatively primitive style and was rarely featured in instrumental solos. Monroe's pre-1946 recordings represent a transitional style between the string-band tradition from which he came and the musical innovation to follow.

== "Original Bluegrass Band" and Monroe's heyday ==
Key developments occurred in Monroe's music with the addition of Lester Flatt and Earl Scruggs to the Blue Grass Boys in December 1945. Flatt played a solid rhythm guitar style that would help to set the course for bluegrass timing. Scruggs played the banjo with a distinctive three-finger picking style that immediately caused a sensation among Opry audiences. Flatt and Scruggs joined a highly accomplished group that included fiddler Howdy Forrester and bassist Joe Forrester and would soon include fiddler Chubby Wise and bassist Howard Watts, who often performed under the name "Cedric Rainwater".

In retrospect, this line-up of the Blue Grass Boys has been dubbed the "Original Bluegrass Band", as the music finally included all the elements that characterize bluegrass music, including breakneck tempos, sophisticated vocal harmony arrangements, and impressive instrumental proficiency demonstrated in solos or "breaks" on the mandolin, banjo, and fiddle. By this time, Monroe had acquired the 1923 Gibson F5 model "Lloyd Loar" mandolin, which became his trademark instrument for the remainder of his career.

The 28 songs recorded by this version of the Blue Grass Boys for Columbia Records in 1946 and 1947 soon became classics of the genre, including "Toy Heart", "Blue Grass Breakdown", "Molly and Tenbrooks", "Wicked Path of Sin", "My Rose of Old Kentucky", "Little Cabin Home on the Hill", and Monroe's most famous song "Blue Moon of Kentucky", which was recorded by Elvis Presley in 1954, appearing as the B-side of his first single for Sun Records. Monroe gave his blessing to Presley's rock and roll cover of the song, originally a slow ballad in waltz time, and re-recorded it himself with a faster arrangement after Presley's version became a hit. Several gospel-themed numbers are credited to the "Blue Grass Quartet", which featured four-part vocal arrangements accompanied solely by mandolin and guitar – Monroe's usual practice when performing "sacred" songs.

Both Flatt and Scruggs left Monroe's band in early 1948, soon forming their own group, the Foggy Mountain Boys. In 1949, after signing with Decca Records, Monroe entered what has been called the "golden age" of his career with what many consider the classic "high lonesome" version of the Blue Grass Boys, featuring the lead vocals and rhythm guitar of Jimmy Martin, the banjo of Rudy Lyle (replacing Don Reno), and fiddlers such as Merle "Red" Taylor, Charlie Cline, Bobby Hicks, and Vassar Clements.

This band recorded a number of bluegrass classics, including "My Little Georgia Rose", "On and On", "Memories of Mother and Dad", and "Uncle Pen", as well as instrumentals such as "Roanoke", "Big Mon", "Stoney Lonesome", "Get Up John", and the mandolin feature "Raw Hide". Carter Stanley joined the Blue Grass Boys as guitarist for a short time in 1951 during a period when The Stanley Brothers had temporarily disbanded.

On January 16, 1953, Monroe was critically injured in a two-car wreck. He and "Bluegrass Boys" bass player, Bessie Lee Mauldin, were returning home from a fox hunt north of Nashville. On highway 31-W, near White House, their car was struck by a drunken driver. Monroe, who had suffered injuries to his back, left arm and nose, was rushed to General Hospital in Nashville. It took him almost four months to recover and resume touring. In the meantime Charlie Cline and Jimmy Martin kept the band together.

By the late 1950s, however, Monroe's commercial fortunes had begun to slip. The rise of rock-and-roll and the development of the "Nashville sound" in mainstream country music both represented threats to the viability of bluegrass. While still a mainstay on the Grand Ole Opry, Monroe found diminishing success on the singles charts, and struggled to keep his band together in the face of declining demand for live performances.

== Folk revival ==
Monroe's fortunes began to improve during the American folk music revival of the early 1960s.

The word "bluegrass" first appeared around this time to describe the sound of Monroe and similar artists such as Flatt and Scruggs, the Stanley Brothers, Reno and Smiley, Jim & Jesse, and the Osborne Brothers. While Flatt and Scruggs immediately recognized the potential for a lucrative new audience in cities and on college campuses in the North, Monroe was slower to respond. Under the influence of Ralph Rinzler, a young musician and folklorist from New Jersey who briefly became Monroe's manager in 1963, Monroe gradually expanded his geographic reach beyond the traditional southern country music circuit. Rinzler was also responsible for a lengthy profile and interview in the influential folk music magazine Sing Out! that first publicly referred to Monroe as the "father" of bluegrass. Accordingly, at the first bluegrass festival organized by Carlton Haney at Roanoke, Virginia in 1965, Bill Monroe was the central figure.

In 1964, before the Grateful Dead got together, Jerry Garcia caravanned across the country from California to tag along with Monroe. He was playing in the band The Black Mountain Boys in Palo Alto with Sandy Rothman, and in May 1964, he visited Neil Rosenberg at Bean Blossom, playing the banjo and making tapes of Monroe's performances.

The growing national popularity of Monroe's music during the 1960s was also apparent in the increasingly diverse background of musicians recruited into his band. Non-southerners who served as Blue Grass Boys during this period included banjo player Bill Keith and singer/guitarist Peter Rowan from Massachusetts, fiddler Gene Lowinger from New Jersey, banjo player Lamar Grier from Maryland, banjo player Steve Arkin from New York, and singer/guitarist Roland White and fiddler Richard Greene from California.

== Later years ==
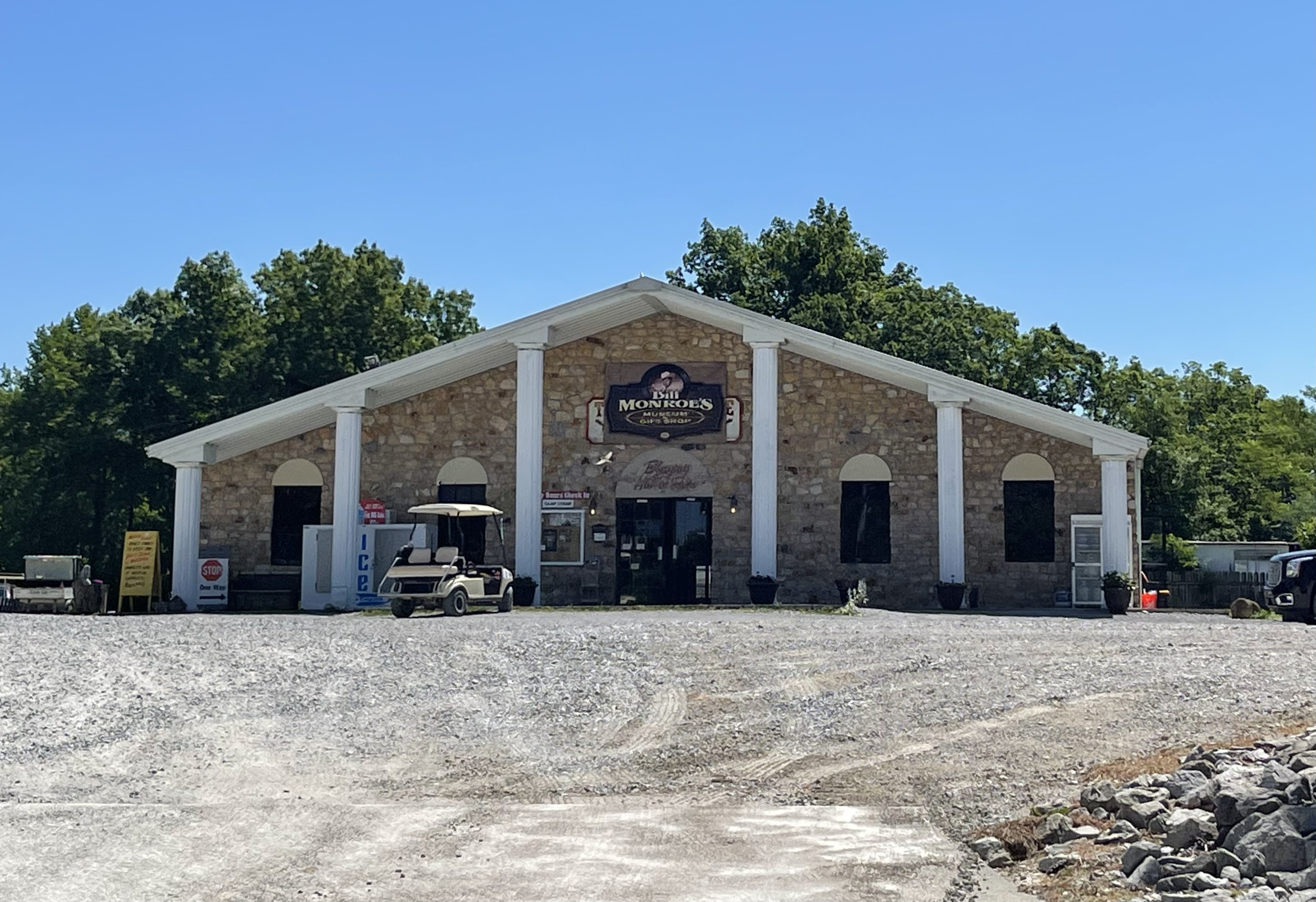
Monroe's Bluegrass Hall of Fame Museum in Morgantown, Indiana. He founded the Hall in 1984.

Even after the folk revival faded in the mid-1960s, it left a loyal audience for bluegrass music. Bluegrass festivals became common, with fans often traveling long distances to see a number of different acts over several days of performances. In 1967, Monroe himself founded an annual bluegrass festival at Bean Blossom in southern Indiana, a park he had purchased in 1951, which routinely attracted a crowd of thousands; a double LP from the festival featuring Monroe, Jimmy Martin, Lester Flatt, and Jim and Jesse was released in 1973. The annual Bill Monroe Bean Blossom Bluegrass Festival is now the world's oldest continuously running annual bluegrass festival.

Monroe's compositions during his later period were largely instrumentals, including "Jerusalem Ridge", "Old Dangerfield" (originally spelled Daingerfield after the town in East Texas), and "My Last Days on Earth"; he settled into a new role as a musical patriarch who continued to influence younger generations of musicians. Monroe recorded two albums of duets in the 1980s; the first featured collaborations with country stars such as Emmylou Harris, Waylon Jennings, and The Oak Ridge Boys, while the second paired him with other prominent bluegrass musicians. A 1989 live album celebrated his 50th year on the Grand Ole Opry. Monroe also kept a hectic touring schedule. On April 7, 1990, Monroe performed for Farm Aid IV in Indianapolis, Indiana along with Willie Nelson, John Mellencamp, Neil Young and with many other artists.

Monroe also had the distinction of playing for four consecutive presidents: Carter, Reagan, Bush and Clinton.

=== Death ===
Monroe's last performance occurred on March 15, 1996. He ended his touring and playing career in April, following a stroke. Monroe died on September 9, 1996, in Springfield, Tennessee, four days shy of his 85th birthday.

== Legacy and influence ==
According to Ralph Rinzler, Monroe impacted music in the following five ways:

1. When others were going electric, Monroe created a space for an acoustic string band tradition to continue to grow and develop within country music.
2. He developed a distinct vocal tradition - the "high lonesome" sound.
3. He established the mandolin as a virtuoso string band instrument
4. He composed a diverse repertoire of songs and instrumental tunes which have become standard fare among bluegrass, country, and some pop musicians.
5. More than any other musician of his time, he skillfully infused country music with archaic tonal subtlety, including Anglo-Scots-Irish and Blues influences.

Monroe was made an honorary Kentucky Colonel in 1966. He was inducted into the Country Music Hall of Fame in 1970, the Nashville Songwriters Hall of Fame in 1971, and the Rock and Roll Hall of Fame (as an "early influence") in 1997. Jimmie Rodgers, Bob Wills, Hank Williams Sr., and Johnny Cash are the only other performers honored in all three. As the "father of bluegrass", he was also an inaugural inductee into the International Bluegrass Music Hall of Honor in 1991. Monroe was a recipient of a 1982 National Heritage Fellowship awarded by the National Endowment for the Arts, which is the United States government's highest honor in the folk and traditional arts. That year's fellowships were the first bestowed by the NEA. In 1993, he received the Grammy Lifetime Achievement Award, and he was awarded the National Medal of Arts in 1995. His well-known song "Blue Moon of Kentucky" has been covered not only by bluegrass but also rock and country artists, most notably Elvis Presley, Paul McCartney, and Patsy Cline. In 2003, CMT had Monroe ranked No. 16 on CMT 40 Greatest Men of Country Music.

Artists that claimed to be influenced by or to be playing the bluegrass genre were often bullied by Monroe. He always considered himself the father and caretaker of bluegrass. He would often say of new bands that did not perform to his standards, "That ain't no part of nothin'." Even those who question the scope of bluegrass refer to Monroe as a "musical giant" and recognize that "there would be no bluegrass without Bill Monroe."

More than 150 musicians played in the Blue Grass Boys over the nearly 60 years of Monroe's performing career. Monroe tended to recruit promising young musicians who served an apprenticeship with him before becoming accomplished artists in their own right. Some of Monroe's band members who went on to greater prominence include singer/guitarists Clyde Moody, Lester Flatt, Jack Cooke, Mac Wiseman, Jimmy Martin, Carter Stanley, Del McCoury, Peter Rowan, Roland White, Roland Dunn and Doug Green; banjo players Earl Scruggs, Bob Black, Butch Robins, Don Reno, Stringbean, Sonny Osborne, and Bill Keith; and fiddlers Tommy Magness, Chubby Wise, Vassar Clements, Byron Berline, Kenny Baker, Bobby Hicks, Gordon Terry, Randall Franks and Glen Duncan. Monroe also regularly performed with flat-picking guitar virtuoso Doc Watson.

Modern bluegrass singer and mandolin player Ricky Skaggs was influenced by Monroe. Skaggs was only six years old, in 1960, when he first got to perform onstage with Monroe and his band at the high school in Martha, Kentucky. He stated, "I think Bill Monroe's importance to American music is as important as someone like Robert Johnson was to blues, or Louis Armstrong. He was so influential: I think he's probably the only musician that had a whole style of music named after his band."

In 1999, the portion of Indiana State Road 135 running from Morgantown through to Nashville, Indiana was dedicated to Monroe and is known as the Bill Monroe Memorial Highway. In 2027, Monroe was inducted into the Volunteer State Music Hall of Fame.

== Blue Grass Boys ==
- David "Stringbean" Akeman
- Kenny Baker
- Byron Berline
- Vassar Clements
- Charlie Cline
- Dana Cupp
- Cleo Davis
- Lester Flatt
- Randall Franks
- Amos Garren
- Richard Greene
- Lamar Grier
- Bobby Hicks
- Bill Keith
- Rudy Lyle
- Jimmy Maynard
- Jimmy Martin
- Bessie Lee Mauldin
- Del McCoury
- Clyde Moody
- Don Reno
- Butch Robins
- Peter Rowan
- Earl Scruggs
- Carter Stanley
- Gordon Terry
- Buck Trent
- Roland White
- Chubby Wise
- Mac Wiseman

== Discography ==
Studio albums

- Knee Deep in Blue Grass (1958)
- I Saw the Light (1958)
- Mr. Blue Grass (1961)
- Bluegrass Ramble (1962)
- Bluegrass Special (1963)
- I'll Meet You in Church Sunday Morning (1964)
- Blue Grass Time (1967)
- Kentucky Blue Grass (1970)
- Uncle Pen (1972)
- Father & Son (1973)
- Road of Life (1974)
- Weary Traveller (1976)
- Bluegrass Memories (1977)
- Together Again (1979)
- Master of Bluegrass (1981)
- Bill Monroe and Friends (1983)
- Stars of the Bluegrass Hall of Fame (1985)
- Bluegrass '87 (1987)
- Southern Flavor (1991)
- Cryin' Holy unto the Lord (1998)

== Sources ==
- Cantwell, Robert. 2003. Bluegrass Breakdown: The Making of the Old Southern Sound. University of Illinois Press. ISBN 0-252-07117-4
- Ewing, Tom. 2018. Bill Monroe: The Life and Music of the Blue Grass Man. Urbana: University of Illinois Press. ISBN 978-0-252-04189-1
- Erbson, Wayne. 2003 Rural Roots of Bluegrass: Songs Stories and History : Native Ground Music. ISBN 1-883206-40-5
- Klein, Bradley. (2011). "Bill Monroe: Celebrating The Father Of Bluegrass At 100". NPR.
- Rumble, John (1998). "Bill Monroe". In The Encyclopedia of Country Music. Paul Kingsbury, Editor. New York: Oxford University Press. pp. 350–2.
- Smith, Richard D. (2000). Can't You Hear Me Callin': The Life of Bill Monroe, Father of Bluegrass. Little, Brown and Company. ISBN 0-316-80381-2.
- Rosenberg, Neil V. Blue Grass Generation: A Memoir. University of Illinois Press. ISBN 9780252083396
- Rosenberg, Neil V., and Charles K. Wolfe (2007). The Music of Bill Monroe. University of Illinois Press. ISBN 0-252-03121-0.
- Malone, Bill C. and Tracey E.W. Laird Country Music USA (2018, 50th anniversary edition), University of Texas Press. ISBN 978-1-4773-1534-7
