= Bobby Osborne =

American musician (1931–2023)

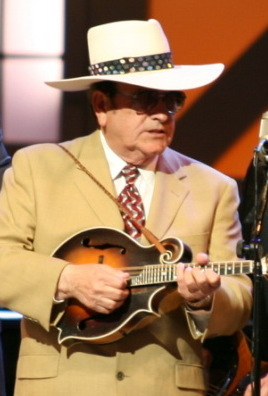
- Osborne performing in 2007
- Born: Bobby Van Osborne; December 7, 1931; Thousandsticks, Leslie County, Kentucky, U.S.
- Died: June 27, 2023 (aged 91); Gallatin, Tennessee, U.S.
- Burial place: Gallatin, Tennessee, U.S.
- Occupation: Musician
- Years active: 1953–2023

Bobby Van Osborne (December 7, 1931 – June 27, 2023) was an American bluegrass musician. He was the co-founder (with his brother Sonny) of the Osborne Brothers, a member of the Grand Ole Opry, and the International Bluegrass Music Hall of Fame. Osborne was a member of the United States Marine Corps, received a Purple Heart for his service, and was honorably discharged in 1953.

Osborne was an instructor of bluegrass music at the Kentucky School of Bluegrass and Traditional Music in Hyden, Kentucky, and his primary instrument was the mandolin.

== Early life ==
Osborne was born in Thousandsticks in Leslie County, Kentucky. While growing up, he helped his father and grandfather at the older man's general store. At the same time he was attracted to the music of the Grand Ole Opry and eventually dropped out of high school to form a band with his brother, Sonny. He helped develop the vocal trio concept in bluegrass music by putting the melody in the tenor voice, instead of putting it in one of the lower vocal registers.

== Career ==
Bobby Osborne released many recordings since the 1950s. The Osborne Brothers recordings of "Rocky Top", and "Kentucky" were named official state songs of Tennessee and Kentucky, respectively. Osborne was drafted into the U.S. Marine Corps in 1951 and served in the Korean War. He was wounded in action and received the Purple Heart.

He appeared on many shows with Ernest Tubb, playing guitar and singing. Ernest Tubb suggested that Bobby play the mandolin to complement his high tenor voice. He took the advice and it remained one of his main instruments for the rest of his career.

Osborne's 2017 solo album ORIGINAL was his first album since Bluegrass & Beyond in 2009. The album was the product of Osborne's collaboration with Peter Rowan, which led him to another collaboration with Alison Brown. The album features many bluegrass/Americana musicians and artists including Vince Gill, Sam Bush, Jim Lauderdale, Sierra Hull, Claire Lynch, Del McCoury, Ronnie McCoury, Rob McCoury, Stuart Duncan and Rob Ickes.

Osborne also wrote the song, "Windy City" in 1972, later recorded by Alison Krauss on her LP "Windy City." Krauss recorded the song with Suzanne and Sidney Cox and performed the song on Jimmy Kimmel Live.

Osborne continued to perform with his band, the Rocky Top X-Press, until his death in 2023.

== Death ==
Osborne died at a hospital in Gallatin, Tennessee, on June 27, 2023, at the age of 91.

== Honors and awards ==
Inducted to Grand Ole Opry (1964, as member of the Osborne Brothers) Between the death of Jesse McReynolds on June 23, 2023, and his own death on June 27, 2023, Osborne was the oldest standing Opry member.

Named Vocal Group of the Year by Country Music Association (1971 as member of the Osborne Brothers)

Inducted to International Bluegrass Music Hall of Fame (1994, as member of the Osborne Brothers).

Inducted to International Bluegrass Music Hall of Fame in 2009 as a member of The Lonesome Pine Fiddlers

Awarded the Bluegrass Star Award by the Bluegrass Heritage Foundation of Dallas, Texas on October 20, 2018. The award is bestowed upon bluegrass artists who do an exemplary job of advancing traditional bluegrass music while preserving its character and heritage.

Elected to Kentucky Music Hall of Fame (2002, as member of the Osborne Brothers)

Nominated for Best Bluegrass Album at the 60th Annual Grammy Awards (for solo album Original).

International Bluegrass Music Award (IBMA) for Recorded Event of the Year (2017, for "I've Gotta Get a Message to You")

2023 Inductee to the West Virginia Music Hall of Fame as a member of The Lonesome Pine Fiddlers

Recognized in the Country Music Hall of Fame and Museum (Posthumously) with C.J. Lewandowski as a 2024 American Currents: State of the Music Exhibit, specifically the Unbroken Circle section of the Exhibit.
