= Breakin' Up Winter =

- Genre: old-time music
- Years active: 1994-present
- Founders: Nashville Old-Time String Band Association
- Website: Official Website

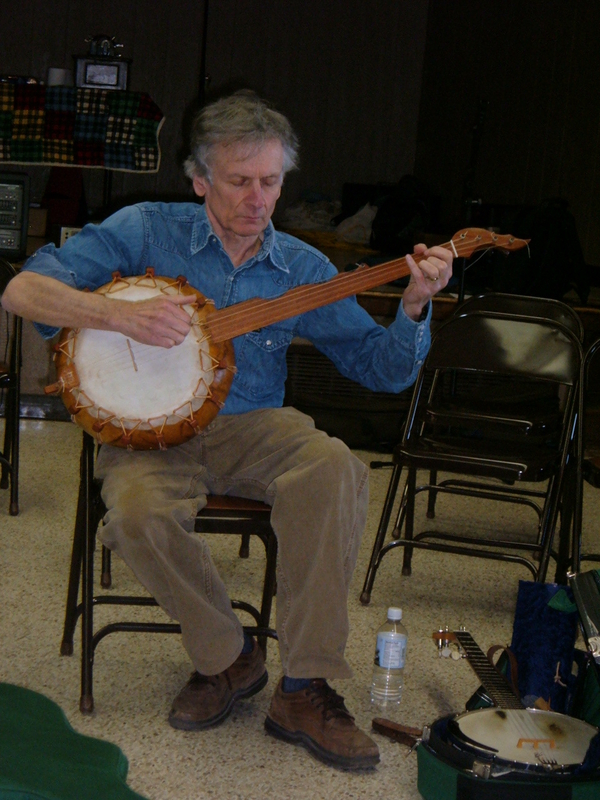
Mike Seeger plays gourd banjo at Breakin' Up Winter

Breakin' Up Winter is an old-time music 'retreat' for string band musicians that began the first weekend of March, 1994. It eschews the contest approach common to larger festivals and brings together hundreds of old-time musicians in a state park setting where the focus is on educational programs and presentations by scholars and icons of the old-time music. Jamming features. The gathering is presented by the Nashville Old-Time String Band Association (NOTSBA), a 501(c)(3) nonprofit organization that began as an offshoot of a community education class in Nashville, Tennessee.

== History ==
The first gathering was held in the Cedar Forest Lodge of the Cedars of Lebanon State Park near Lebanon, Tennessee, about 30 miles outside Nashville. The first Breakin' Up Winter retreat was an informal gathering of friends who shared an interest in and love for old-time string band music. Having come from another small old-time gathering in Athens, Alabama, they wanted to create that same atmosphere in Middle Tennessee. The retreat continues at Cedars of Lebanon, encompassing the entire state park. Legendary old-time fiddler Charlie Acuff was a guest of honor at the first event and has been a central artist through the years.

== Scholars and artists ==
Charlie Acuff was the first in a long line of widely respected "heritage artists" - icons of old-time music - to headline Breakin' Up Winter. There developed a theme for the first day of the event - 'Roots of Old-Time Music' - that brings in noted researchers, authors, and performers.

Noted traditional music researcher/author/folklorist Charles Wolfe was a mainstay until his untimely death in 2006.

Each year, the event begins with scholarly presentations by researchers and authors and demonstrations by musicians with deep roots in the music.

"Participatory music like old-time music involves a great deal of gifting—passing along tunes, playing with others, learning from others, sharing, and coming together for events such as Breakin’ Up Winter to do all of this," writes Jeff Todd Titon, professor of ethnomusicology at Brown University.

In addition to Charlie Acuff and Charles Wolfe, presenters and performers have included:

- Alan Jabbour
- Bill Mansfield
- Bruce Greene
- Clyde Davenport
- Dan Gellert
- Don Pedi
- Evan Hatch
- Franklin George
- Gerry Milnes
- George Gruhn
- J.P. Fraley
- James Bryan
- Jim Griffith
- John Harrod
- Joyce Cauthen
- Mike Seeger
- Kerry Blech
- Paul Wells
- Ralph Blizard
- Ron Pen
- Will Keys
- Walt Haden

== The Focus: Old-time String Band Music ==
The music is variously referred to as "mountain music" or "old-timey" or "fiddle tunes." It is the focus of the Nashville Old-Time String Band Association, whose stated mission is: ". . . to preserve, promote, and perform old-time string band music." The retreat aims to reach the roots of old-time music.

A flurry of interest in "old-time" music in the 1940s, and the American folk music revival of the 1940s through the 1970s, brought millions of new listeners to this traditional music. In Appalachia and many communities outside of the region, this type of music had been and continues to be passed down through generations.

== Heritage Awards ==
In 2008, NOTSBA began presenting its Heritage Award to musicians.

- 2026 John Harrod
- 2025 Jim and Joyce Cauthen
- 2024 Gretchen Priest-May
- 2023 Bob Townsend
- 2020 Buddy Ingram
- 2019 Art Rosenbaum
- 2018 Thomas Maupin
- 2017 Paul Brown
- 2016 Walt Koken
- 2015 Vesta Johnson
- 2014 Alice Gerrard
- 2013 Kerry Blech
- 2012 Lester McCumbers
- 2011 Franklin George
- 2010 Alan Jabbour
- 2009 Clyde Davenport
- 2008 Charlie Acuff

== See also ==
- List of bluegrass music festivals
