= Reaves White County Ramblers =

The Reaves White County Ramblers were an Old-time Country Music stringband active in the 1920s.

From White County, Arkansas, the Ramblers were made up of brothers Issac "Ike" Reaves on fiddle, Ira Reaves on fiddle, Loyd Reaves on vocals and piano and Fred Rumble on guitar and backup vocals. Ike, born in 1887, was the oldest brother and bandleader.

In April 1928 they journeyed to Chicago for a recording session. When they got to the studio they discovered that the studio did not have a working piano and instead Loyd was forced to use a reed organ instead, making them one of the very few country stringbands to record with the instrument. As an additional note the Reaves brothers were also unusual in using an archaic technique of keeping time by beating on the strings with a heavy straw.

They recorded ten sides including the standards "Arkansas Traveler", "Shortnin Bread" and four lesser known songs. Six weeks later they returned for a second series of sides, mostly waltzes and blues.

The Ramblers made no further recordings but continued to perform locally for many years. Ike died in 1967 while Ira was alive in 1969 when he gave an interview to musicologist Dave Freeman.
