= Brad Leftwich =

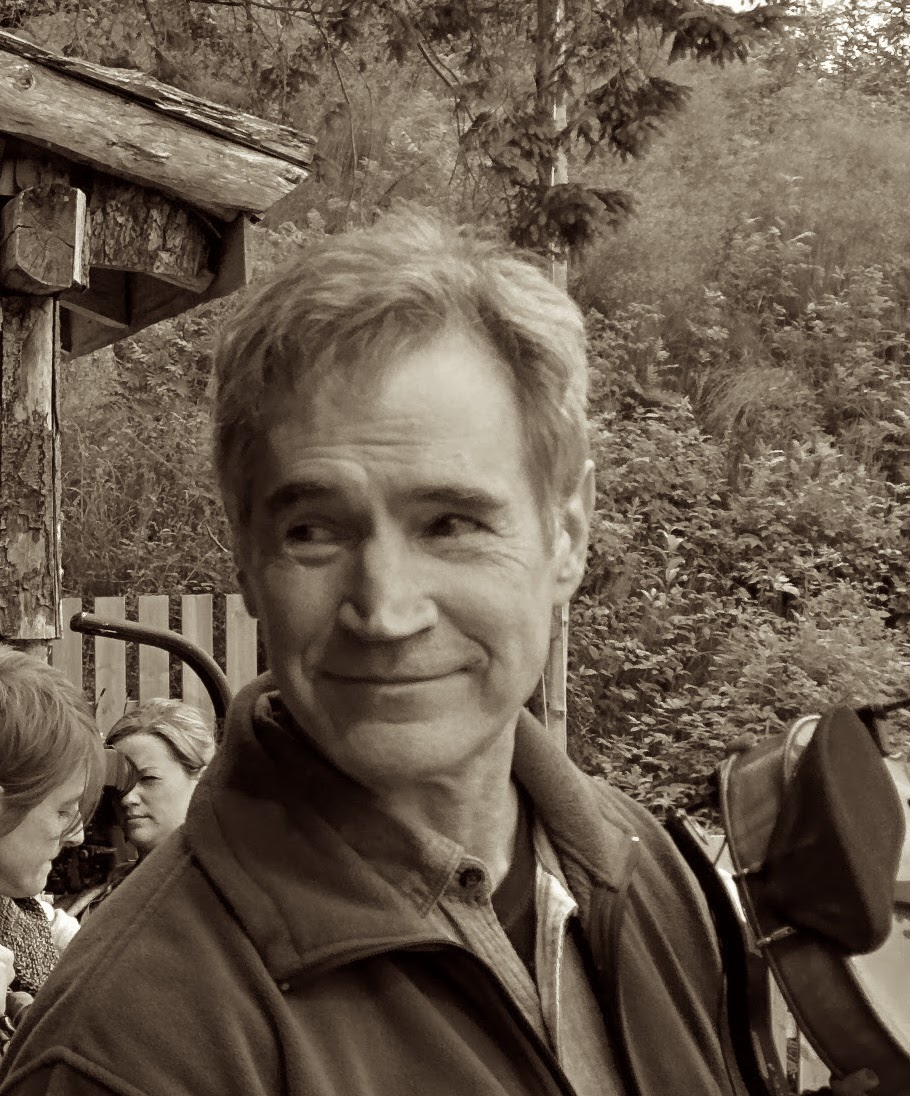
- Leftwich in 2015

Background information
- Born: June 30, 1953 (age 72); Stillwater, Oklahoma, United States
- Genres: Old-time music
- Years active: mid-1970s–present
- Labels: Rounder; County; Copper Creek; Marimac; June Appal; Dark Train Records; Chubby Dragon
- Website: Brad Leftwich homepage

Brad Leftwich (born June 30, 1953) is an American old-time fiddler, banjo player, singer and teacher of traditional old-time style. He is originally from Oklahoma but has resided in Bloomington, Indiana for most of his life. He performs solo and with his long-time musical partner and wife, Linda Higginbotham, and with his band, The Humdingers, which also includes Sam Bartlett and Abby Ladin.

Since the 1970s, Leftwich has performed and taught at folk festivals, concerts, and music camps, written books on both fiddle and banjo, released instructional old-time fiddle videos and written articles on traditional fiddling. He also maintains a YouTube channel with some of his original field recordings.

== Early life ==
Leftwich grew up in a musical family. His mother played piano and sang in church, and he first learned to play some old-time guitar from his father when he was 8 or 9 years old. But probably his greatest musical influence was listening to his grandfather Rush Leftwich on banjo and great uncle George Leftwich on fiddle. Originally from Carroll County, Virginia, Rush and George played the traditional style of old-time music that was common in their area. Though Rush and George died before Leftwich was a teenager, they had already shaped his desire to learn to play old time music.

Leftwich asked for his first banjo when he was 15, and fiddle when he was 17. By the time he left to study at Oberlin College, he had developed some proficiency in bluegrass banjo, as well as some clawhammer banjo and a bit of fiddle.He also had made contact with some of the local old-time musicians still playing in Oklahoma.

While in college, Leftwich traveled during summer breaks to old-time fiddle conventions to learn more about the musical style. It was during one of these summer breaks that Leftwich and a friend first visited noted old-time fiddler Tommy Jarrell at his home in the Mount Airy region of North Carolina. Tommy took a liking to Leftwich that was enhanced by the discovery that Brad and Jarrell's wife were distant relatives.

Tommy Jarrell became Brad's main old-time music mentor, alerting Brad to a traditional style of playing that used deliberate bowing patterns. This style is characterized by beginning musical phrases on the down-bow, or pulling the bow away from the fiddle, among other features.Brad also continued to seek out and learn from other traditional musicians still living in the Ozarks, the Mid-west, Virginia, West Virginia, and North Carolina and particularly cites Melvin Wine, John Dee Kennedy, T Fuller and Violet Hensley as sources of inspiration.

== Career ==
=== Music ===
Since the 1970s, Leftwich has played with a range of musical acts and been a founding member of several including the Plank Road String Band, the Humdingers, the Hogwire Stringband, and Tom, Brad & Alice, a group formed with Tom Sauber and noted bluegrass musician Alice Gerrard. Leftwich has also made several recordings with his wife Linda Higginbotham.

Leftwich's recordings have also been used as a reference for Slippery Hill, an educational website maintaining a massive archive of source recordings for traditional American fiddle tunes. He has recorded for June Appal, Rounder, County, Copper Creek, Marimac, and his own label Dark Train Records.

Shortly after graduating from Oberlin College in 1975, Leftwich moved to the musically active community of Lexington, Virginia where he co-founded the Plank Road String Band. After recording two albums, Leftwich moved to Chicago to pursue advanced studies in anthropology. After a couple of years, Leftwich moved to Bloomington, Indiana to take courses in Indiana University's Folklore and Ethnomusicology program. In his new home, Leftwich met Linda Higginbotham, an active member of the Bloomington Old-Time Music and Dance Group. After somewhat of a hiatus from fiddling, Leftwich's return to an active old-time community, and encouragement from Higginbotham, who he taught to play banjo and banjo uke, brought about his permanent return to old-time music.

=== Teaching and scholarship ===
Leftwich has taught at numerous music camps nationwide and in Europe. He has written articles on fiddling for Fiddler Magazine and for the Old-Time Herald, which he helped found. His Mel Bay books on Round Peak fiddling and banjo playing, as well as his teaching videos for Homespun, have also contributed to an increased appreciation for traditional old-time music and its subtleties.

== Personal life ==
Leftwich lives in Bloomington, Indiana with his wife Linda Higginbotham.

== Discography ==
=== Recordings ===
- 2021 - At Home in the Parlor. Brad Leftwich & Linda Higginbotham. Old-Time Tiki Parlour
- 2020 - Rise and Bloom Again. Brad Leftwich and The Humdingers. Dark Train Records
- 2013 - The Lost Child. Leftwich and Higginbotham. Dark Train Records
- 2011 - Rascal Fair. Brad Leftwich and the Hogwire Stringband. Dark Train Records
- 2005 - The Humdingers. Brad Leftwich and The Humdingers. Chubby Dragon
- 2005 - Carve That Possum. Tom, Brad, and Alice. Copper Creek Records
- 2001 - We’ll Die in the Pigpen Fighting. Tom, Brad and Alice. Copper Creek Records
- 2000 - Holly Ding. Tom, Brad and Alice. Copper Creek Records
- 1999 - Been There Still. Tom, Brad and Alice. Copper Creek Records
- 1996 - Say, Old Man. with Linda Higginbotham. County Records
- 1993 - A Moment in Time. with Dan Gellert. Marimac Records
- 1984 - No One to Bring Home Tonight. Leftwich and Higginbotham. County Records
- 1983 - Buffalo Gal. Leftwich and Higginbotham. RedBud Records
- 1978 - Plank Road. Plank Road Stringband. June Appal Recordings
- 1976 - Plank Road Stringband. Plank Road Stringband. Carryon Records

=== Selected anthologies ===
- 2009 - Rounder Fiddle. Rounder Records
- 1995 - Carrying on the Traditions: Appalachian Fiddling Today. Fiddler Magazine Video
- 1986 - A Tribute to Tommy Jarrell. Heritage Records

=== Instructional books and DVDs ===
- 2011 - Old-Time Fiddle Round Peak Style. Mel Bay Publications
- 2004 - Learn to Play Old-Time Fiddle Volume 1 & 2. Homespun Tapes
- 1999 - Round Peak Style Clawhammer Banjo. Mel Bay Publications
