= Ginny Hawker and Tracy Schwarz =

American husband-and-wife folk music duo

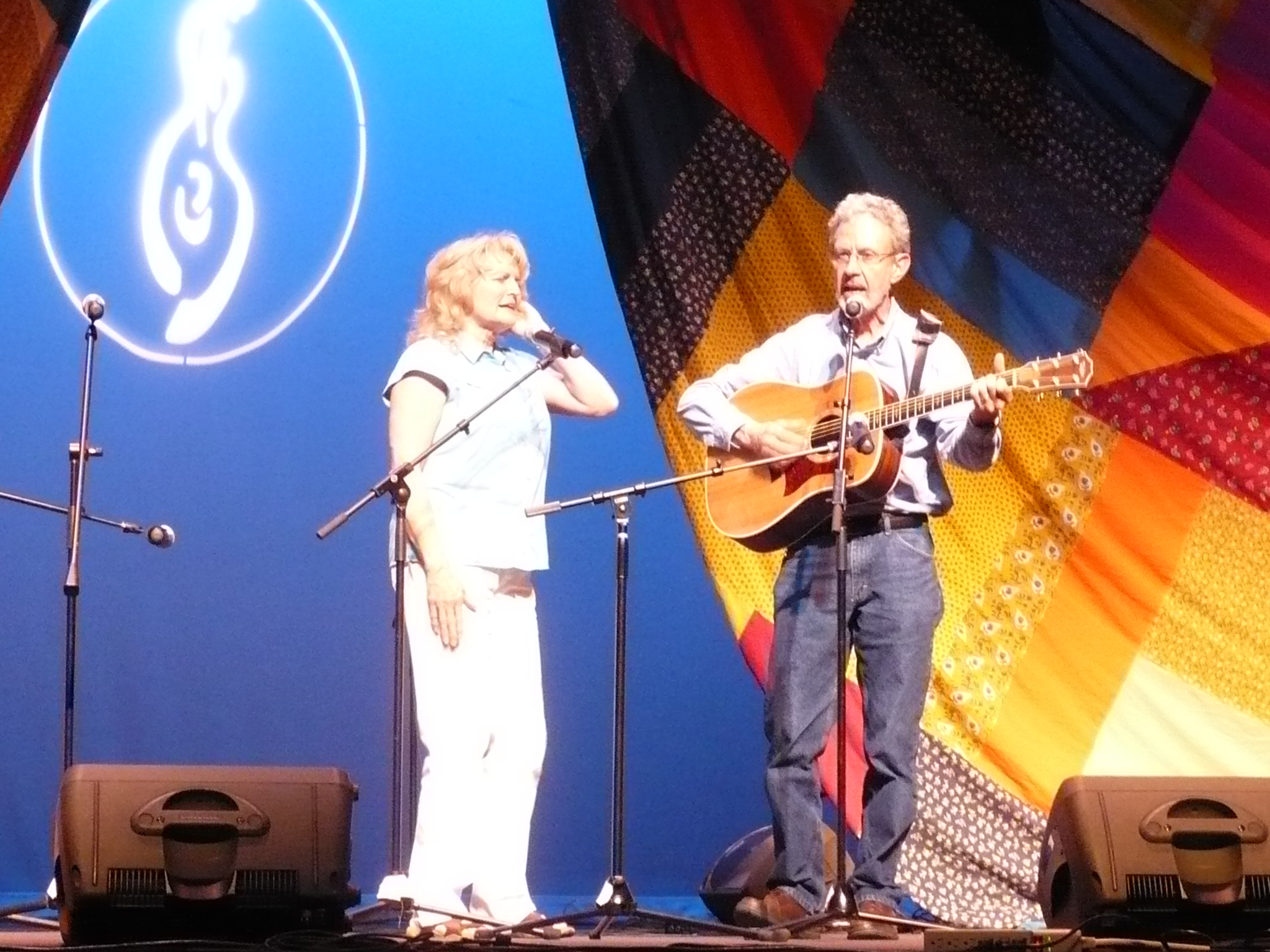
- Ginny Hawker and Tracy Schwarz performing in 2009

Background information
- Genre: Folk
- Labels: Rounder, Arhoolie
- Formerly of: New Lost City Ramblers
- Website: ginnyandtracy.com

Ginny Hawker (born April 22, 1940) and Tracy Schwarz (November 13, 1938 – March 29, 2025) were an American husband-and-wife folk music duo known for performing traditional music from the early American canon of bluegrass, gospel, and old time music. The duo, however, on occasion did record original songs and music by contemporary songwriters. Hawker continues to live in the small village of Tanner, West Virginia. Tracy Schwarz was a member of the New Lost City Ramblers and Strange Creek Singers. The other members of the New Lost City Ramblers (Tom Paley’s former band) were John Cohen and Mike Seeger. The other members in Strange Creek Singers (Mike and Tracy’s other band) were Alice Gerrard, Hazel Dickens, and Lamar Grier.

Tracy Schwarz died on March 29, 2025, at the age of 86.

== Selected discography ==
=== Ginny Hawker and Tracy Schwarz ===
- Draw Closer (2004, Rounder)
  - with Ron Stewart, Peter Schwarz, and Kari Sickenberger
  - produced by Dirk Powell
- Good Songs for Hard Times (2000, Copper Creek)
  - with Buddy Griffin, Jim Martin, and Peter Schwarz

=== Ginny Hawker ===
- Letters from my Father, Ginny Hawker (2001 Rounder)
  - with Tim O'Brien, Darrell Scott, Ron Stewart, Dirk Powell, Dennis Crouch, and Kenny Malone
- Bristol, A Tribute to the Carter Family, Ginny Hawker & Kay Justice (1999, Copper Creek/June Appal)
  - with Tracy Schwarz and Mike Seeger
- Heart of a Singer, Hazel Dickens, Carol Elizabeth Jones, and Ginny Hawker (1998 Rounder)
  - with Ron Stewart, Pete Kennedy, Dudley Connell, Barry Mitterhoff, Marshall Wilborn, Bruce Molsky, and Lynn Morris.
- Come All You Tenderhearted, Ginny Hawker & Kay Justice (1995, June Appal)
- Signs & Wonders, Ginny Hawker & Kay Justice (June Appal)
- Pathway to West Virginia, Ginny Hawker & Kay Justice (Pathway)

=== Tracy Schwarz ===
- New Lost City Ramblers: 40 Years of Concert Recordings (2001 Rounder)
- There Ain't No Way Out, The New Lost City Ramblers (1997 Smithsonian Folkways)
- A Cajun Practice Music Tape, Tracy Schwarz
- Mes Amis!, The Tracy Schwarz Cajun Trio (1996, Swallow)
  - with Matt Haney and Lee Blackwell
- Feel Bad Sometime (1990 Marimac Recordings)
- Louisiana And You (1991 Marimac Recordings)
- Third Annual Farewell Reunion: Mike Seeger (1994, Rounder) [New Lost City Ramblers play on one track]
- The Tracy Schwarz Cajun Trio (1993, Swallow)
- How to Play the Cajun Accordion, Marc Savoy and Tracy Schwarz
- Strange Creek Singers: Strange Creek Singers (1972, Arhoolie)
- 50 Years: Where Do You Come From? Where Do You Go? (2009 Smithsonian Folkways)
- Cajun Fiddle, Old and New: Instruction (1977 Smithsonian Folkways)
- Classic Old-Time Fiddle from Smithsonian Folkways (2007 Smithsonian Folkways)
- Dancing Bow and Singing Strings (1979 Smithsonian Folkways)
- Down Home with Tracy and Eloise Schwarz (1978 Smithsonian Folkways)
- Learn to Fiddle Country Style (1965 Smithsonian Folkways)
- Les Quatre Vieux Garçons:Dewey and Tony Balfa, and Tracy and Peter Schwarz (1984 Smithsonian Folkways)
- Look Out! Here It Comes (1975 Smithsonian Folkways)
- Modern Times: The New Lost City Ramblers (1968 Smithsonian Folkways)
- On the Great Divide: The New Lost City Ramblers (1975 Smithsonian Folkways)
- Out Standing in Their Field: The New Lost City Ramblers, Vol . 2, 1963-1973 (1993 Smithsonian Folkways)
- The Second Annual Farewell Reunion: Mike Seeger (1973, Mercury) [New Lost City Ramblers on one track, Strange Creek Singers on two tracks]
- Remembrance of Things to Come: The New Lost City Ramblers (1973 Smithsonian Folkways)
- Rural Delivery No. 1: The New Lost City Ramblers (1964 Smithsonian Folkways)
- String Band Instrumentals: The New Lost City Ramblers (1964 Smithsonian Folkways)
- The Harry Smith Connection: A Live Tribute to the Anthology of American Folk Music (1998 Smithsonian Folkways)
- Our Kind of Music with Tracy and Eloise Schwarz (1978, Old Homestead)
- The New New Lost City Ramblers with Tracy Schwarz: Gone to the Country (1963 Smithsonian Folkways)
- Tracy Schwarz's Fiddler's Companion (1981 Smithsonian Folkways)
- Tracy's Family Band: Rode the Mule Around the World (1981 Smithsonian Folkways)
- Traditional Cajun Fiddle: Instruction (1976 Smithsonian Folkways)
- Home Among the Hills with Tracy and Eloise Schwarz (1973, Folk Variety Records)
