= Marimac Recordings =

- Founded: 1984
- Founder: Larry MacBride
- Defunct: 1993
- Status: Defunct
- Genre: Old time, blues, Cajun
- Country of origin: U.S.
- Location: Crown Point, Indiana

Marimac Recordings was founded by Larry MacBride in 1984 and continued with releases of American old time, blues and Cajun music until his death from abdominal cancer on August 24, 1993.

The releases covered old master fiddlers, young string bands, and under-represented Cajun and blues musicians. The label released some 100 recordings before Larry MacBride's death. In 1996, Rounder Records issued a sampler CD of recordings from the label.

== Roster ==
- Brad Leftwich
- Cephas & Wiggins
- Rafe Stefanini with the Wildcats
- Matokie Slaughter
- Tracy Schwarz
- Volo Bogtrotters

== Discography ==
A partial listing of the recordings issued is available on-line which omits a number of albums including

1. 6020 Cajun Dance Tonight – The Bone Tones
2. 6021 Louisiana and You – Tracy Schwarz
