= Red Mountain (band) =

Red Mountain Yellowhammers
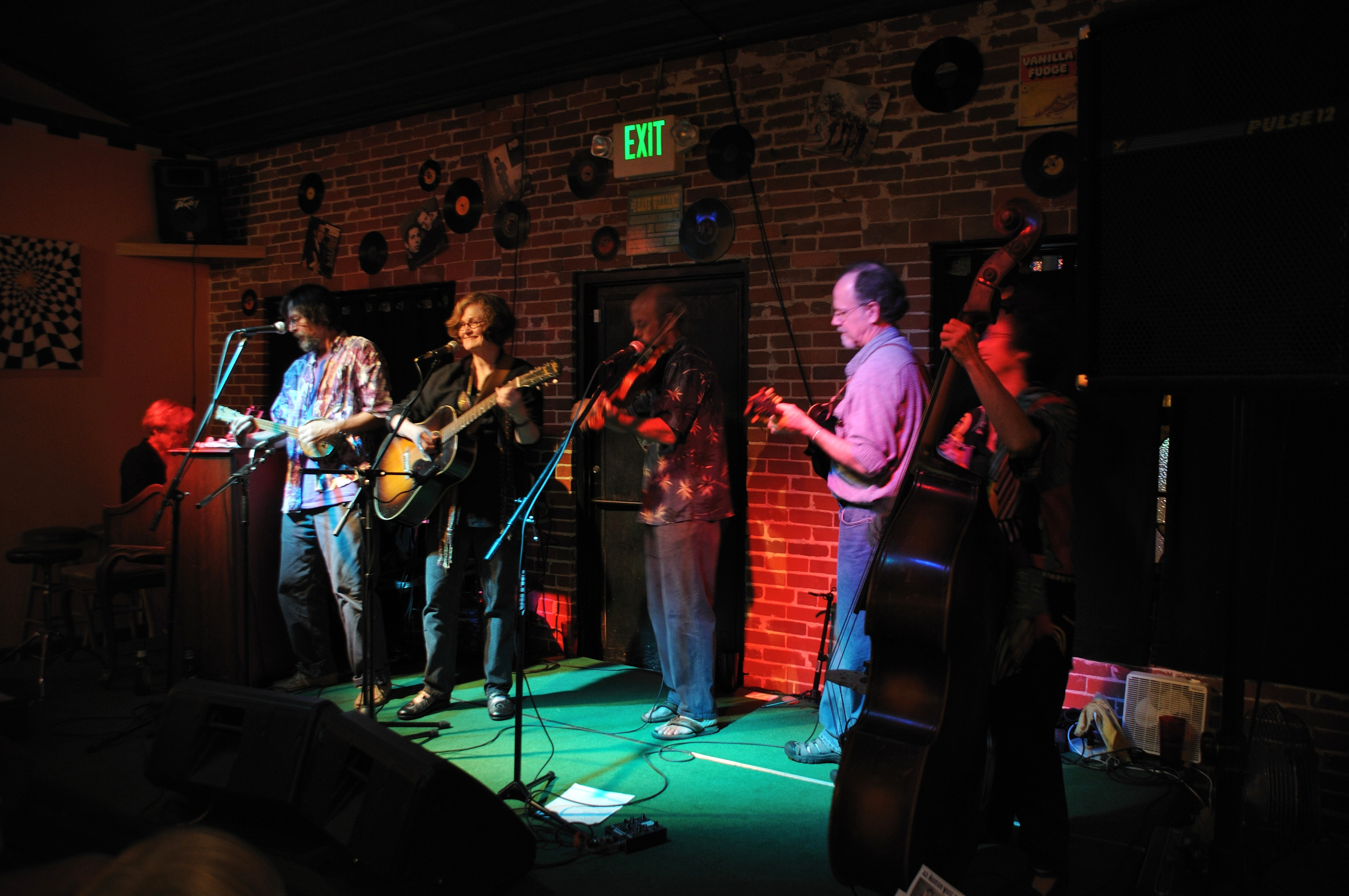
- The band performs.

Background information
- Origin: Birmingham, Alabama
- Genres: Old-time music string band
- Labels: Whoop It Up!
- Members: Jim Cauthen; Joyce Cauthen; Phil Foster; Jamie Finley; Bill Martin; Nancy Jackson
- Website: http://sites.google.com/site/redmountainstringband/

The Red Mountain Yellowhammers is an old-time string band, originally known as The Red Mountain White Trash, from Birmingham, Alabama. A number of its members originally lived in Birmingham's Red Mountain neighborhood where they began playing together in 1985.

The band is composed of Jim Cauthen (fiddle), Joyce Cauthen (guitar), Phil Foster (mandolin), Jamie Finley (harmonica and banjo uke), Kathy Hinkle (bass), Diann Weatherly (ukulele) and Herb Trotman (dobro).

== Discography ==
- Fire in the Dumpster (1995), Whoop It Up! #101
- Chickens Don't Roost Too High (1999), Whoop It Up! #102
- Sweet Bama (2002), Whoop It Up! #103
- Throw the Old Cow Over the Fence (2009), Whoop It Up! #104
