= Hazel Dickens =

American bluegrass musician, singer, and activist

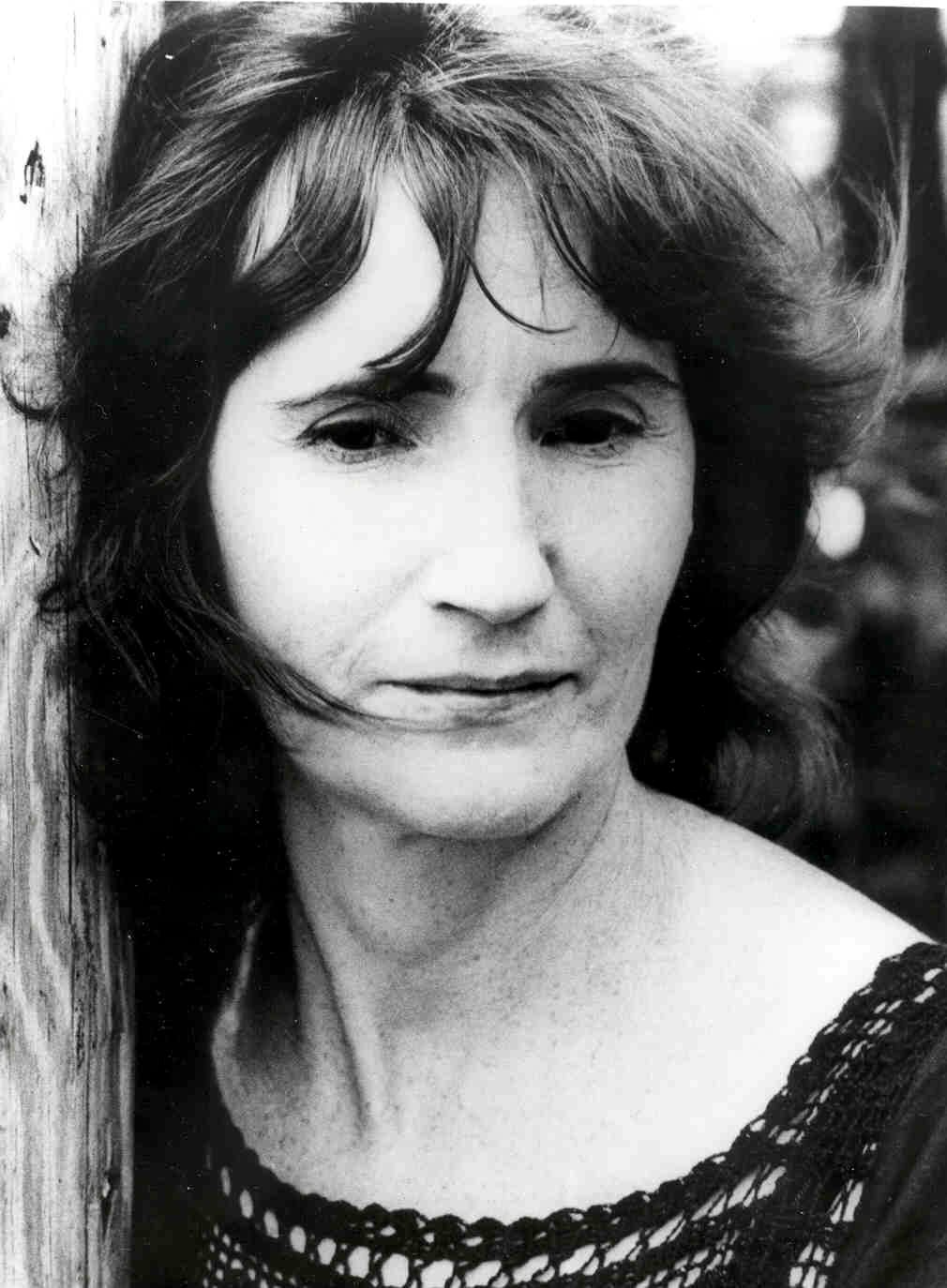

Background information
- Born: June 1, 1925; Mercer County, West Virginia, U.S.
- Died: April 22, 2011 (aged 85) Washington, D.C., U.S.
- Genres: Bluegrass, folk music
- Instruments: Vocals, double bass, guitar, banjo
- Labels: Rounder, Folkways, Arhoolie
- Resting place: Roselawn Memorial Gardens, Princeton, West Virginia

Hazel Jane Dickens (June 1, 1925^{[a]} – April 22, 2011) was an American bluegrass singer, songwriter, double bassist, guitarist and banjo player. Her music was characterized not only by her high, lonesome singing style, but also by her provocative pro-union, feminist songs. Cultural blogger John Pietaro noted that "Dickens didn’t just sing the anthems of labor, she lived them and her place on many a picket line, staring down gunfire and goon squads, embedded her into the cause." The New York Times extolled her as "a clarion-voiced advocate for coal miners and working people and a pioneer among women in bluegrass music." With Alice Gerrard, Dickens was one of the first women to record a bluegrass album. She was posthumously inducted into the International Bluegrass Music Hall of Fame alongside Gerrard in 2017.

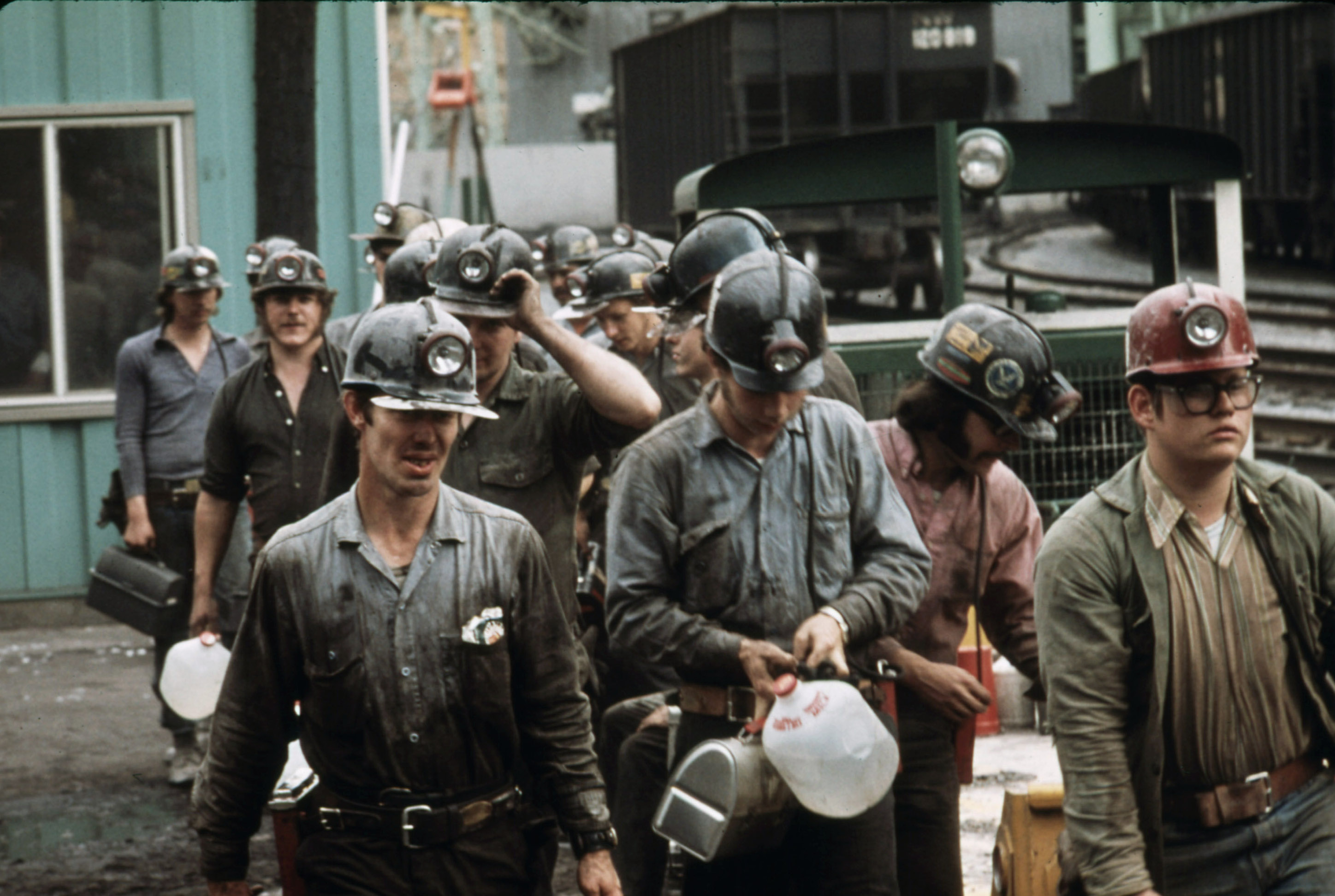
Dickens was known for her activism on behalf of non-unionized mineworkers

== Career ==
Hazel Dickens was born in Montcalm, West Virginia, on June 1, 1925, the eighth of eleven siblings in a mining family of 6 boys and 5 girls. Many of Hazel's relatives were miners, including her brothers, cousins, and, eventually, her brothers-in-law. Her father worked as a minister at a Primitive Baptist church and played the banjo.

After Hazel's oldest sister moved to Baltimore in the 1940s, Hazel and her parents decided to follow suit. They arrived in Baltimore in the 1950s at different times—Hazel earlier—where she got a job working in a factory. She met Mike Seeger, younger half-brother of Pete Seeger and founding member of the New Lost City Ramblers, through her brother Robert, who had met him at a TB (Tuberculosis) hospital where Seeger was working at the time. Dickens and Seeger became active in the Baltimore–Washington area bluegrass and folk music scene during the 1960s, playing in living rooms and later on in bars with Bob Baker's bluegrass band as the area's folk movement began to gain traction. The group played a mixture of traditional tunes Hazel had learned over the course of her childhood in Mercer County as well as contemporary bluegrass music popularized by groups such as The Stanley Brothers, Flatt & Scruggs, and Bill Monroe. Dickens and Seeger left Baker's group around 1958.

During this time she also established a collaborative relationship with Alice Gerrard, who married Mike Seeger in 1970, and as "Hazel & Alice" recorded two albums for the Folkways label: Who's That Knocking (And Other Bluegrass Country Music) (1965) and Won't You Come & Sing for Me (1973). Dickens and Gerrard were bluegrass bandleaders at a time when the vast majority of bluegrass bands were led by men. Together, they recorded two additional albums on Rounder Records, but Hazel & Alice broke up in 1976 and Dickens pursued a solo career where her music and songwriting became more political. Hazel and Alice’s band, Strange Creek Singers recorded for the Arhoolie label. Mike Seeger, Tracy Schwarz, and Lamar Grier were also in the band.

Dickens used her music to try and make a difference in the lives of non-unionized mine workers and feminists. Dickens started to write more about the lives of miners and wrote a song titled "Black Lung" about her brother, Thurman, who died from the disease. She wrote a song titled "Coal Mining Women" about the hardships women faced in the coal mining world. In 1978, Dickens performed at the Vandalia Gathering in Charleston, West Virginia, both solo and then with the former coal-miner turned musician, Carl Rutherford. Dickens began to be seen as an activist and a voice for the working people.

She appeared in the Oscar-winning documentary Harlan County, USA, which centers on the struggle of the county's miners union against scab workers, wage rights, and health conditions; she contributed four songs to the film's soundtrack. She also appeared in the films Matewan and Songcatcher.

== Death ==
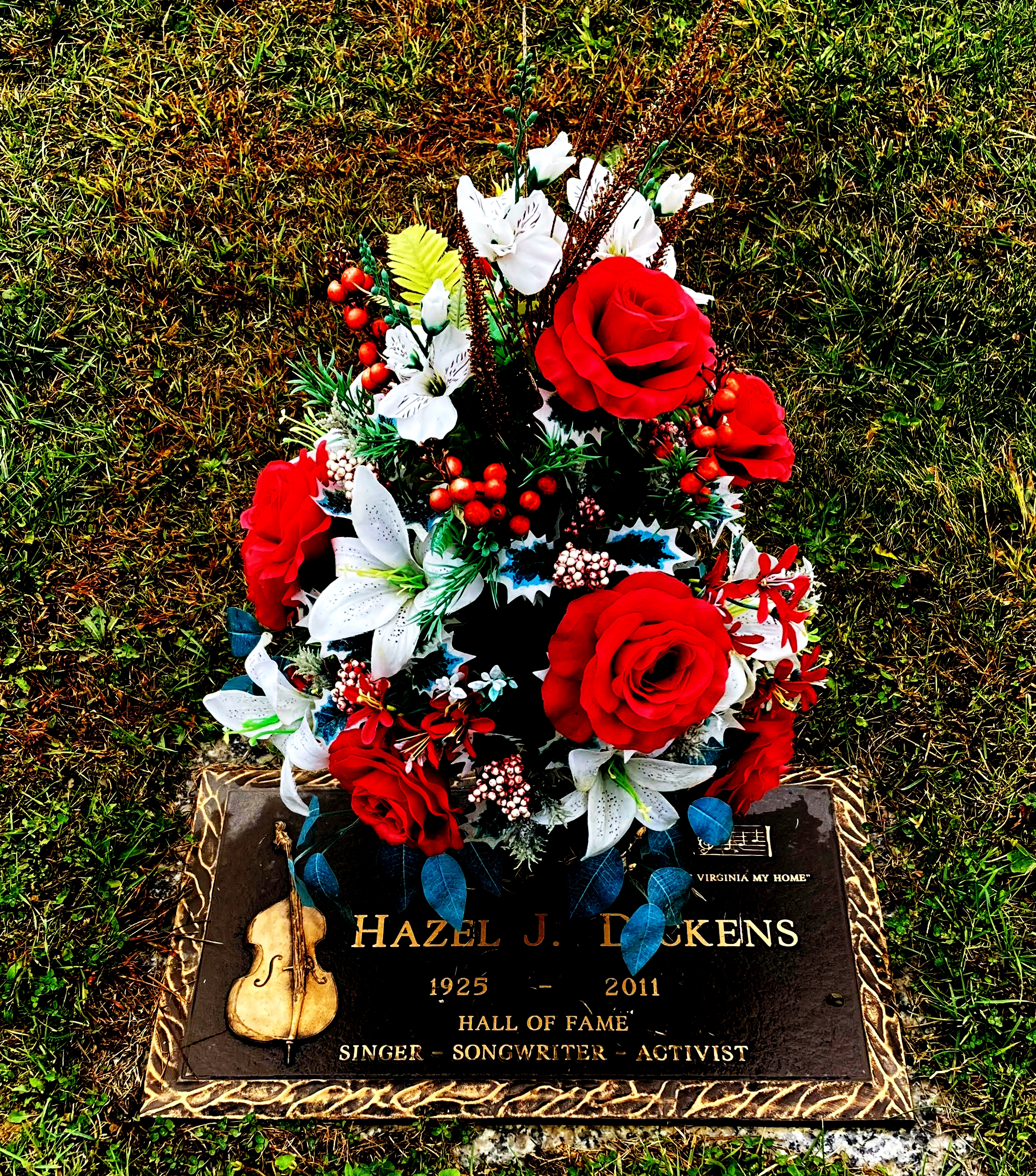
Grave in Princeton, West Virginia

In 2011, Dickens died in a Washington, D.C., hospice from complications of pneumonia. She was buried in Princeton, West Virginia, at Roselawn Memorial Gardens. After her death, it was incorrectly reported in major media that she had been born on June 1, 1935, but her relatives and public records confirmed the earlier date of June 1, 1925.

Stating that "music saves mountains", fans and supporters of Dickens's activism announced a special memorial, Tribute to West Virginia Music Legend Hazel Dickens at the Charleston, West Virginia, Cultural Center on June 5, 2011.

== Personal life ==
Hazel Dickens married Joseph S. Cohen (a folk music enthusiast, taxi driver, and counselor) in 1965; the two divorced in 1970.

== Discography ==
=== Singles and EPs ===
- "They'll Never Keep Us Down" (Rounder Records, 1976) – for the film Harlan County, U.S.A.
- "Busted" / "Old Calloused Hands" (Rounder Records, 1980) – from the album Hard Hitting Songs for Hard Hit People

=== Solo albums ===
- Hard Hitting Songs for Hard Hit People (Rounder Records, 1980)
- By the Sweat of My Brow (Rounder Records, 1983)
- It's Hard to Tell the Singer From the Song (Rounder Records, 1987)
- A Few Old Memories (Rounder Records, 1987) – Compilation, includes a new recording of the song "Pretty Bird"

=== With Alice Gerrard ===
- Who's That Knocking (Folkways, 1965)
- Won't You Come & Sing for Me (Folkways, 1973)
- Hazel & Alice (Rounder, 1973)
- Hazel Dickens and Alice Gerrard (Rounder, 1976)
- Hazel Dickens & Alice Gerrard – Pioneering Women of Bluegrass (Smithsonian Folkways, 1996) – Re-mastered and re-sequenced compilation of Who's That Knocking and Won't You Come & Sing For Me
- Sing Me Back Home: The DC Tapes, 1965-1969 (Free Dirt, 2018)

=== With Carol Elizabeth Jones, Ginny Hawker ===
- Heart of a Singer (Rounder Records, 1998)

=== With Strange Creek Singers ===
- Strange Creek Singers (Arhoolie, 1970)

=== Other recordings ===
- Come All You Coal Miners (Rounder Records, 1973) - Recorded At the Appalachian Music Workshop At Highlander Center, October 1972, included Dickens singing "Black Lung", "Cold Blooded Murder", "Clay County Miner", "Mannington Mine Disaster"
- They'll Never Keep Us Down: Women's Coal Mining Songs (Rounder Records, 1984) - included new studio recordings "Coal Mining Woman", "Coal Miner's Grave", "Coal Tattoo", and "They'll Never Keep Us Down", recorded for the 1982 film Coalmining Women.
- Matewan: Original Soundtrack (Daring Records, 1987) - included recordings of Dickens singing a-Capella in the film, "Gathering Storm", "What A Friend We Have In Jesus", "Hills Of Galilee", and a studio recording, "Fire In The Hole"
- Don't Mourn—Organize!: Songs of Labor Songwriter Joe Hill (Smithsonian Folkways, 1990) - included the Joe Hill song about Elizabeth Gurley Flynn, "Rebel Girl"
- Live Recordings 1956–1969: Off the Record Volume 1 (Smithsonian Folkways, 1993) - a live Bill Monroe compilation
- Coal Mining Women (Rounder Records, 1997) - included an a cappella performance of "Clara Sullivan's Letter", and compiled songs from 1973 Come All You Coal Miners and 1984 They'll Never Keep Us Down releases
- Songcatcher: Music From And Inspired By The Motion Picture (Vanguard Records, 2001) - included Dickens performing "A Conversation With Death"

== Films ==
=== Films in which Dickens appears ===
- Harlan County, U.S.A. (1976). Directed by Barbara Kopple.
- Matewan (1987). Directed by John Sayles.
- Songcatcher (2000). Directed by Maggie Greenwald.
- Hazel Dickens: It's Hard to Tell the Singer from the Song (2001). Documentary on Dickens directed by Mimi Pickering (Appalshop).
- Radical Harmonies (2002). Documentary film directed by Dee Mosbacher in which Dickens was interviewed.

=== Films in which Dickens contributes to the soundtrack ===
- Harlan County, U.S.A. (1976). Directed by Barbara Kopple.
- Coalmining Women (1982). Directed by Elizabeth Barret. Whitesburg, Kentucky: Appalshop.
- Matewan (1987). Directed by John Sayles.
- Songcatcher (2000). Directed by Maggie Greenwald.
- Black Lung (2006). Directed by Shane Roberts.
- Dopesick miniseries, episode 1 (2021). Directed by Barry Levinson.

== Other ==
Her name appears in the lyrics of the Le Tigre song "Hot Topic."

== Awards and honors ==
Dickens received the Merit Award from the International Bluegrass Music Association in 1994 and was the first woman to do so. In 2001 she was presented with a National Heritage Fellowship by the National Endowment for the Arts, which is the United States' highest honor in the folk and traditional arts.

== Notes ==
a. Sources vary on birth date; see talk page discussion
