= Rafe Stefanini =

Italian-American musician and violin maker

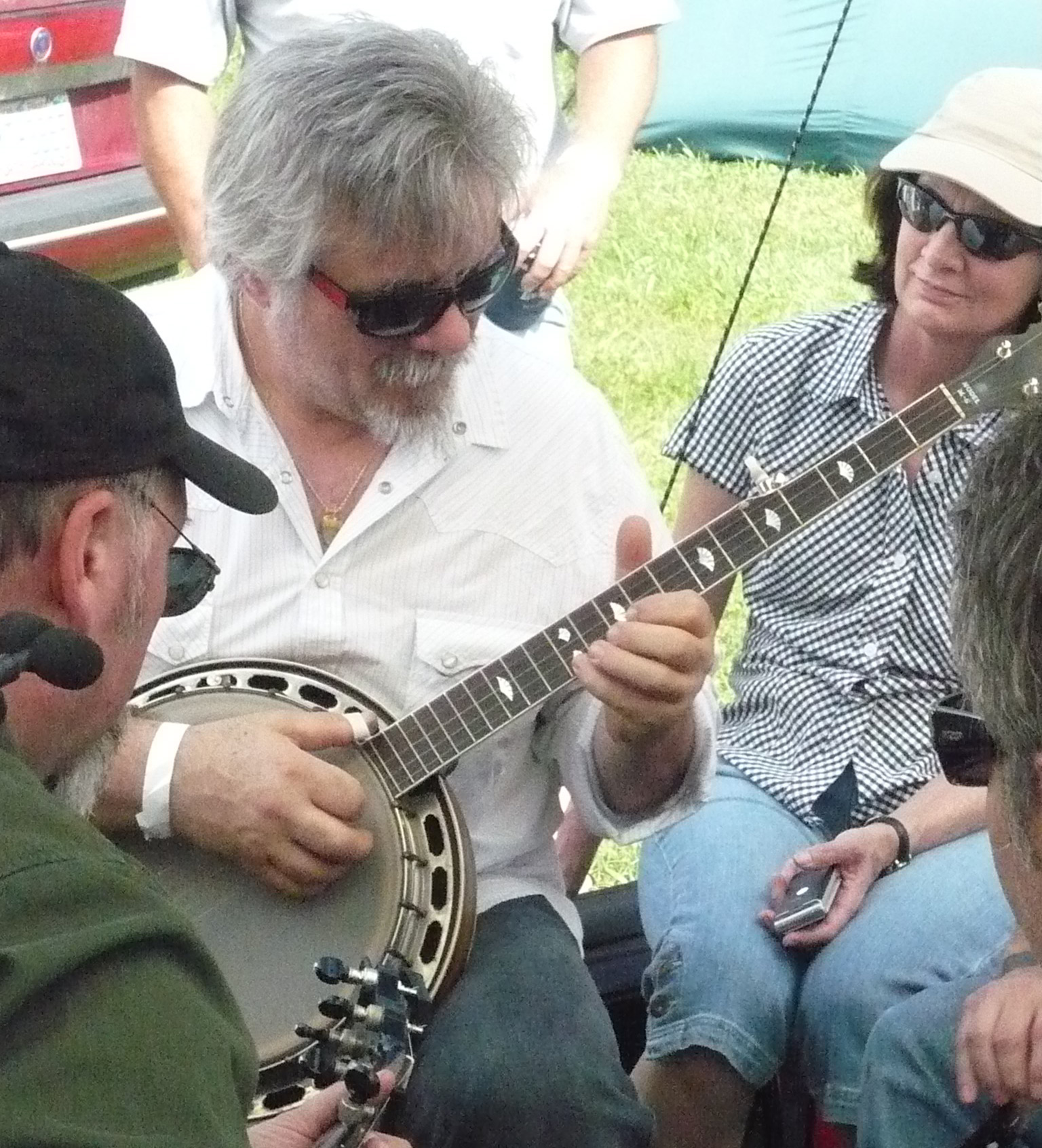
- Rafe Stefanini in 2009

Background information
- Born: Rafe Coolbreeze Stefanini
- Genre: old-time
- Occupations: Musician, singer, teacher, violin maker, restorer
- Instruments: Vocals, fiddle, banjo, guitar
- Website: rafeandclelia.com

Rafe Stefanini is an old-time banjo player, fiddler, guitarist, singer, teacher, violin maker and restorer.

He was born in San Benedetto Val di Sambro, Emilia-Romagna, northern Italy and grew up in Bologna. He first visited the United States in 1975, and came to live in the U.S. in 1983. He became a U.S. citizen, and lived for many years in Elkins Park, Pennsylvania, a suburb of Philadelphia, before relocating to Madison, a neighborhood of Nashville, Tennessee, in July 2021. In addition to playing music, he is also trained in violin making and restores violins.

He has performed with the Wildcats (along with Carol Elizabeth Jones and Stefan Senders). Along with Dirk Powell and Bruce Molsky he has performed with a trio called the L-7s. He has also performed with Molsky and guitarist Beverly Smith in a group called Big Hoedown, a group that disbanded in 2000. Along with Meredith McIntosh, John Hermann, and Bev Smith, he has performed in the Rockinghams. He has also recorded with Bob Herring. He performs with his wife Nikki Lee (who plays guitar) and daughter Clelia (who plays fiddle, guitar, double bass, and ukulele) as "Nine Pound Hammer." Together, the three make up the Stefanini Family Band.

He has recorded for the Rounder, County, Marimac, Heritage, Yodel-ay-hee, 5-String Productions, and World Music Network labels.

Stefanini has performed on A Prairie Home Companion and at the Mount Airy Fiddlers Convention. He has performed throughout the United States as well as in Finland, Germany, Singapore, Thailand, Indonesia, Malaysia, and Brunei.

His brothers Gianni and Bruno also play old-time music and the three performed in The Moonshine Brothers, which formed in the late 1970s and remained together until Stefanini moved to the U.S. in 1983.

== Discography ==
=== As leader ===
- 1999 – Hell and Scissors (County)
- 2001 – Glory on the Big String (County)
- 2006 – Bluegrass Meadows (5-String)
- 2006 – Ladies Fancy (County)

=== With Bob Herring ===
- 1995 – Old Paint (Yodel-ay-hee)
- 2004 – Fresh Coat (5-String)

=== With Bruce Molsky and Big Hoedown ===
- 1997 – Bruce Molsky & Big Hoedown (Rounder)

=== With Clelia Stefanini ===
- 2009 – Never Seen the Like...

=== With The Wildcats ===
- Old Time Music (Marimac)
- On Our Knees (Yodel-ay-hee)

=== Compilations ===
- Galax International (Heritage)
- 5th Annual Galax Fiddlers Convention 1985 (Heritage)
- 2002 – Rough Guide to the Music of the Appalachians (World Music Network)
- 2003 – The Art Of Old-Time Mountain Music (Rounder)

=== Other ===
- The Rockinghams (Yodel-ay-hee)
- Shout Lulu (with The Rockinghams)
- Old Time Friends (with Ray Alden and others) (Marimac)
- The Young Fogies (Heritage)
- Mike Seeger: 3rd Annual Farewell Reunion (with The L-7s on one track; 1995 Grammy nominee)
- A Tribute to the Appalachian String Band Music Festival (with The L-7s) (Chubby Dragon)
- The Marimac Anthology (Rounder)
- The Young Fogies, Volume 2 (Rounder)
- Red Prairie Dawn (with Gary Harrison & The Mule Team) (Gary Harrison)
- The Immigrant Band (with John Doyle, Eamon O'Leary, John Hermann, and Clelia Stefanini)
