= Matokie Slaughter =

- Born: Matokie Worrell; December 21, 1919; Pulaski, Virginia, U.S.
- Died: December 31, 1999 (aged 80) Pulaski, Virginia, U.S.
- Genres: clawhammer, old time music
- Occupation: musician
- Instruments: banjo, fiddle
- Years active: 1940s–1990s
- Labels: County Records, Marimac Recordings
- Formerly of: Matokie Slaughter & The Back Creek Buddies

"Big Eyed Rabbit"
Matokie Slaughter, "Big Eyed Rabbit" from Clawhammer Banjo, Volume Two (County Records) (c. 1960s)

Matokie Worrell Slaughter (December 21, 1919 – December 31, 1999), sometimes known as "Tokie" Slaughter, was an American clawhammer banjo player.

Born in Pulaski, Virginia, to a large musical family, Slaughter performed regularly with her family on local radio in the 1940s. She and her sister Virgie (later Virgie Worrel Richardson) also appeared regularly at local fiddler's conventions. She was discovered by the larger old-time music community when some of her recordings appeared on Charles Faurot's clawhammer banjo anthologies during the 1960s. Later, she made many appearances at folk music festivals and workshops throughout the US and formed a band called Matokie Slaughter & The Back Creek Buddies with her sister Virgie and old-time music revivalist Alice Gerrard. The band issued a cassette-only release, Saro, in 1990.

Slaughter is known for her unique, driving style of clawhammer banjo playing, with complex noting and double-noting and featuring both uppicking and downpicking. She also occasionally played fiddle.

During the 1990s, San Francisco artist Margaret Kilgallen began drawing freight-train graffiti using the name "Matokie Slaughter" as an homage to the original Matokie Slaughter. A fictionalized version of Matokie Slaughter also figured prominently in many of Kilgallen's non-graffiti artworks.

Slaughter died ten days after her 80th birthday in 1999.

== Discography ==
- More Clawhammer Banjo Songs & Tunes From The Mountains: Big Eyed Rabbit (County Records, 1969)
- Clawhammer Banjo Volume 3: Georgie (County Records, 1978)
- Saro (w/ The Back Creek Buddies) (Marimac Recordings, 1990)
- Banjo Classics From The Vaults Of County Records & Old Blue Records: New River Train (Old Blue Records, 2012)

== Compilations ==
- Legends Of Old-Time Music - Fifty Years Of County Records: Big Eyed Rabbit (County Records, 2015)
