= Southern Folklife Collection =

Special collections at the University of North Carolina at Chapel Hill

Coordinates: 35°54′34.59″N 79°2′58.69″W

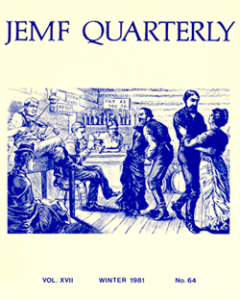
JEMF Quarterly. Vol. 17. Winter 1981. No 64

The Southern Folklife Collection is an archival resource at the University of North Carolina at Chapel Hill, dedicated to collecting, preserving and disseminating traditional and vernacular music, art, and culture related to the American South. The Southern Folklife Collection is located in UNC's Louis Round Wilson Special Collections Library.

== History ==
The University of North Carolina at Chapel Hill's Folklore Program was one of the first graduate programs for Folklore in the United States. The early faculty included Ralph Steele Boggs, Arthur Palmer Hudson, and Guy B. Johnson, all of whom donated materials that were ultimately placed in the SFC. In 1968, faculty members of the Folklore Program established the UNC Folklore Archives. The John Edwards Memorial Foundation was formed in California in 1962 as an archive and research center named for Australian record collector John Edwards. Following Edwards untimely death in 1960, his remarkable collection of American country music records, along with a wealth of correspondence and other research materials, was strengthened by additions from his American friends and colleagues, including Eugene Earle, Archie Green, D. K. Wilgus, Ken Griffis, Ed Kahn, and Norm Cohen. In 1983, UNC purchased the John Edwards Memorial Collection, and, in the fall of 1986, the UNC Folklore Archives and the JEMC were combined to form the Southern Folklife Collection. The SFC officially opened for research during the Sounds of the South conference at UNC in April 1989.

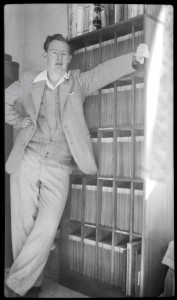
Australian collector and discographer John Edwards

== Scope ==
The Southern Folklife Collection is an archival resource for the study of American folk music and popular culture. Its holdings document all forms of southern musical and oral traditions across the entire spectrum of individual and community expressive arts, as well as mainstream media production. Centered around the John Edwards Memorial Collection, the SFC is rich in materials documenting the emergence of old-time, country-western, bluegrass, blues, folk, gospel, rock and roll, Cajun and zydeco musics. The SFC contains over 300,000 sound recordings, 3,000 video recordings and eight million feet of motion picture film as well as tens of thousands of photographs, song folios, posters, manuscripts, books, serials, research files and ephemera.

== Collections ==
Notable collections held by the SFC include those of Apollo Records (1944), Broadside magazine, Guy and Candie Carawan, Eugene Earle, William R. Ferris, Folk Alliance International, Alice Gerrard, Archie Green, Peter Guralnick, John Edwards Memorial Foundation, Stuart Hamblen, George Hamilton IV, Highlander Research and Education Center, John D. Loudermilk, Peter B. Lowry, McCabe's Guitar Shop, Merge Records, Music Maker Relief Foundation, Mike Seeger, and Sons of the Pioneers.

== Partnership with Yep Roc Records ==
In January 2017, SFC announced a partnership with Yep Roc Records, a record label based out of Hillsborough, North Carolina. As part of the partnership, SFC "will create digital masters of rare archival recordings, which Yep Roc Records will produce, package, and distribute."

Three rare recordings to be released with Yep Roc Records were announced alongside news about the partnership. The first release was a remastered recording of Dolly Parton's first single "Puppy Love" and the original "B" side, "Girl Left Alone." The tracks were originally recorded in 1959, when the singer was just thirteen years old and released on Goldband Records, a prominent southern music label in the 1950s and 1960s. The reissue was in the form of an exclusive 45" vinyl available only on Record Store Day of 2017 (April 22).

The second release is a compilation of classic Cajun music titled Swampland Jewels, also originally released on Goldband Records. The tracklisting includes songs from important Cajun musicians such as Jo-El Sonnier, Boozoo Chavis, Iry LeJune Jr., and Cleveland Crochet. It is scheduled to be released on September 22, 2017.

The last of the initial three releases will be a live recording of Doc Watson, a prolific guitar player and Grammy Lifetime Achievement Award recipient known for his "flatpicking" skills. The album, titled Live at the Club 47, was recorded in Cambridge, Massachusetts in 1963. The re-release date is currently unknown.
