= Mike Seeger =

American folk musician and folklorist (1933–2009)

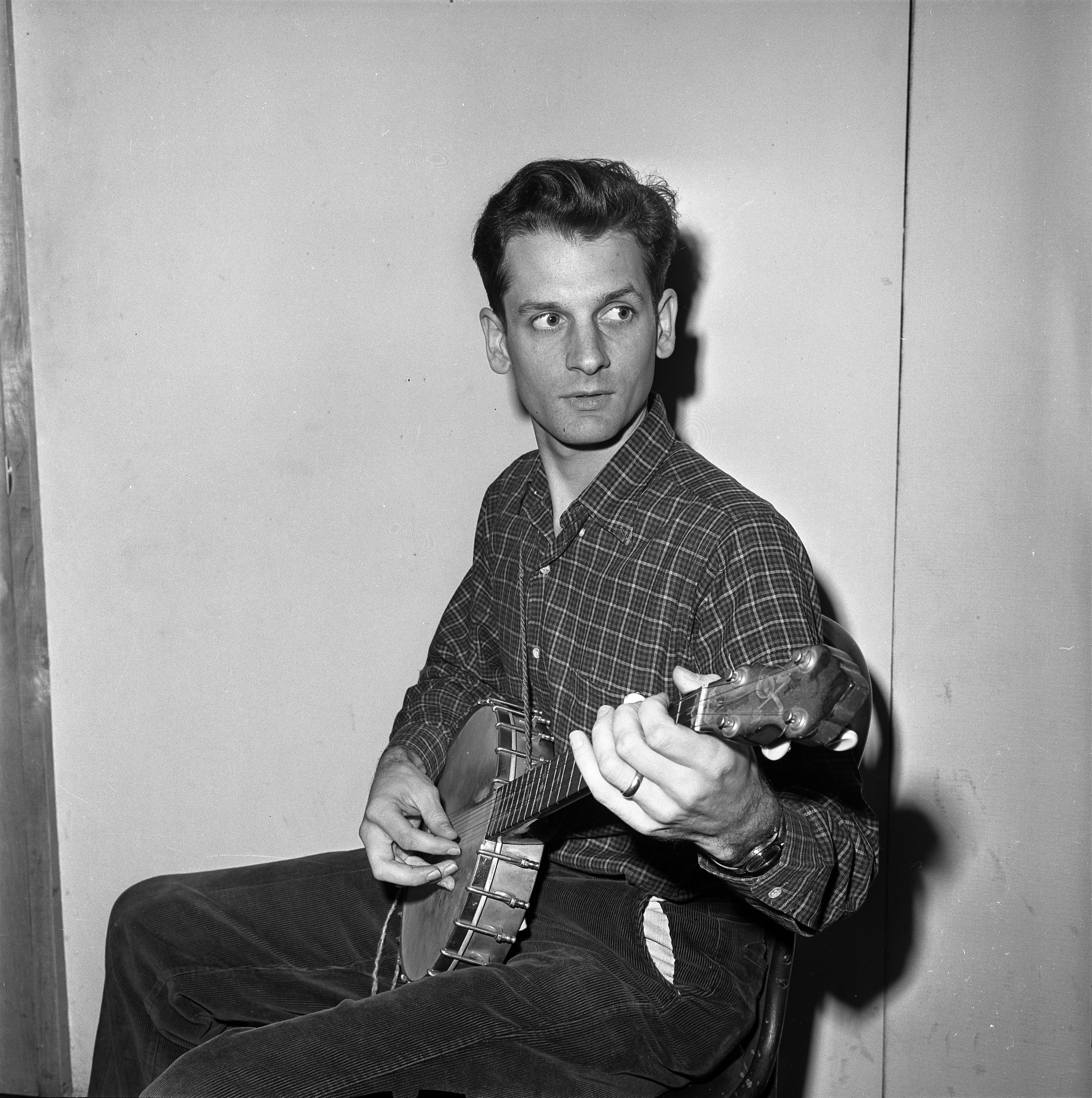
- Seeger in 1964

Background information
- Born: August 15, 1933; New York City, New York, U.S.
- Origin: New York City
- Died: August 7, 2009 (aged 75) Lexington, Virginia, U.S.
- Genres: Old-time; folk
- Occupations: Musician; singer
- Instruments: Banjo; autoharp; violin; dulcimer; guitar; mandolin; jaw harp; harmonica; pan pipes
- Labels: Folkways; Rounder; Argo; Greenhays; 5-String Productions; Arhoolie; Appalseed
- Formerly of: New Lost City Ramblers, Strange Creek Singers

Mike Seeger (August 15, 1933 – August 7, 2009) was an American folk musician and folklorist. He was a distinctive singer and an accomplished musician who mainly played autoharp, banjo, fiddle, dulcimer, guitar, harmonica, mandolin, dobro, jaw harp, and pan pipes. Seeger, a half-brother of Pete Seeger, produced more than 30 documentary recordings, and performed in more than 40 other recordings. He desired to make known the caretakers of culture that inspired and taught him. He was posthumously inducted into the International Bluegrass Music Hall of Fame in 2018.

== Early life ==
Seeger was born in New York and grew up in Maryland and Washington D.C. His father, Charles Louis Seeger Jr., was a composer and pioneering ethnomusicologist, investigating both American folk and non-Western music. His mother, Ruth Crawford Seeger, was a composer. His eldest half-brother, Charles Seeger III, was a radio astronomer, and his next older half-brother, John Seeger, taught for years at the Dalton School in Manhattan. His next older half brother was Pete Seeger. His uncle, Alan Seeger, the poet who wrote "I have a rendezvous with Death", was killed during the First World War. Seeger was a self-taught musician who began playing stringed instruments at the age of 18. He also sang Sacred Harp with British folk singer Ewan MacColl and his son, Calum. Seeger's sister Peggy Seeger, also a well-known folk performer, married MacColl, and his sister Penny wed John Cohen, a member of Mike's musical group, New Lost City Ramblers.

The family moved to Washington D.C. in 1936 after his father's appointment to the music division of the Resettlement Administration. While in Washington D.C., Ruth Seeger worked closely with John and Alan Lomax at the Archive of American Folk Song at the Library of Congress to preserve and teach American folk music. Ruth Seeger's arrangements and interpretations of American Traditional folk songs in the 1930s, 1940s and 1950s are well regarded.

== Musical career ==
At about the age of 20, Seeger began collecting songs by traditional musicians on a tape recorder. Folk musicians such as Lead Belly, Woody Guthrie, John Jacob Niles, and others were frequent guests in the Seeger home.

In 1958, he co-founded the New Lost City Ramblers, an old-time string band in New York City, during the Folk Revival. The other founding members included John Cohen and Tom Paley. Paley later left the group in 1962 and was replaced by Tracy Schwarz. The New Lost City Ramblers directly influenced countless musicians in subsequent years. The Ramblers distinguished themselves by focusing on the traditional playing styles they heard on old 78rpm records of musicians recorded during the 1920s and 1930s. The members in Seeger and Schwarz's other band, Strange Creek Singers, were Alice Gerrard, Hazel Dickens, and Lamar Grier.

"Seeger sings with spunk and authenticity, plays eight acoustic instruments, and taps his foot pretty good, and even if you (and I) can't dance to it, I guarantee you somebody can."

— Christgau's Record Guide: Rock Albums of the Seventies (1981)

Seeger received six Grammy nominations and was the recipient of four grants from the National Endowment for the Arts, including a 2009 National Heritage Fellowship, which is the United States government's highest honor in the folk and traditional arts. His influence on the folk scene was described by Bob Dylan in his autobiography, Chronicles: Volume One. He was a popular presenter and performer at traditional music gatherings such as Breakin' Up Winter.

Eight days before his 76th birthday, Seeger died at his home in Lexington, Virginia, on August 7, 2009, after stopping cancer treatment.

The Mike Seeger Collection, which includes original sound and video recordings by Seeger, is located in the Southern Folklife Collection of the Wilson Library of the University of North Carolina at Chapel Hill.

== Discography ==
- Old Time Country Music (Smithsonian Folkways) (1962)
- Mike Seeger (Vanguard) (1964)
- Tipple, Loom & Rail (Smithsonian Folkways) (1965)
- Mike and Peggy Seeger (Argo) (1966)
- Mike and Alice Seeger in Concert (King (JP)) (1971)
- Music From True Vine (Mercury) (1972)
- Berkeley Farms (Folkways) (1972)
- The Second Annual Farewell Reunion (Mercury) (1973) [New Lost City Ramblers on one track, Strange Creek Singers on two tracks]
- American Folk Songs for Children (with Peggy Seeger) (Rounder) (1977)
- Alice Gerrard and Mike Seeger (Greenhays) (1980) - reissued in its entirety on Bowling Green CD on 5-String Productions in 2008
- Fresh Oldtime String Band Music (Rounder) (1988)
- American Folk Songs for Christmas (with Peggy and Penny Seeger) (Rounder) (1989)
- Solo: Oldtime Country Music (Rounder) (1991)
- Animal Folk Songs for Children (with Peggy, Penny, and Barbara Seeger) (Rounder) (1992)
- Third Annual Farewell Reunion (Rounder) (1994) [New Lost City Ramblers play on one track]
- Way Down in North Carolina (with Paul Brown) (Rounder) (1996)
- Southern Banjo Sounds (Smithsonian Folkways) (1998)
- Retrograss (with John Hartford and David Grisman) (Acoustic Disc) (1999)
- True Vine (Smithsonian Folkways) (2003)
- Early Southern Guitar Sounds (Smithsonian Folkways) (2007)
- Talking Feet (Book) Compiled with dancer Ruth Pershing (Consignment) (2007)
- Talking Feet (DVD) (Smithsonian Folkways) (2007)
- Fly Down Little Bird (with Peggy Seeger) (Appalseed) (2011)

=== Recordings with Strange Creek Singers ===
- Strange Creek Singers (Arhoolie) (1970)

=== Recordings with the New Lost City Ramblers ===
- New Lost City Ramblers (Smithsonian Folkways) (1958)
- Old Timey Songs for Children (Smithsonian Folkways) (1959)
- Songs for the Depression (Smithsonian Folkways) (1959)
- New Lost City Ramblers – Vol. 2 (Smithsonian Folkways) (1960)
- Newport Folk Festival, 1960, Vol. 1 (Vanguard - VRS 9083) (1960)
- New Lost City Ramblers – Vol. 3 (Smithsonian Folkways) (1961)
- New Lost City Ramblers (Smithsonian Folkways) (1961)
- New Lost City Ramblers – Vol. 4 (Smithsonian Folkways) (1962)
- American Moonshine and Prohibition Songs (Smithsonian Folkways) (1962)
- New Lost City Ramblers – Vol. 5 (Smithsonian Folkways) (1963)
- Gone to the Country (Smithsonian Folkways) (1963)
- String Band Instrumentals (Smithsonian Folkways) (1964)
- Rural Delivery No. 1 (Smithsonian Folkways) (1964)
- Modern Times (Smithsonian Folkways) (1968)
- New Lost City Ramblers with Cousin Emmy (Smithsonian Folkways) (1968)
- Remembrance of Things to Come (Smithsonian Folkways) (1973)
- On the Great Divide (Smithsonian Folkways) (1975)
- Earth is Earth (Smithsonian Folkways) (1978)
- Tom Paley, John Cohen, Mike Seeger Sing Songs of the New Lost City Ramblers (Smithsonian Folkways) (1978)
- 20th Anniversary Concert, with Elizabeth Cotten, Highwoods String Band, Pete Seeger & the Green Grass Cloggers (FLYING FISH (Rounder) (1978)
- The Early Years, 1958–1962 (Smithsonian Folkways) (1991)
- Out Standing in their Field: The New Lost City Ramblers, Vol 2, 1963–1973 (Smithsonian Folkways) (1993)
- There Ain't No Way Out (Smithsonian Folkways) (1997)
- 40 Years of Concert Recordings (Rounder) (2001)
- 50 Years: Where Do You Come From? Where Do You Go? (Smithsonian Folkways) (2008)

=== Recordings with others ===
- Jean Ritchie - The Most Dulcimer (Greenhays) (1984) [Seeger plays on two tracks]
- Hesperus - Crossing Over (Greenhays) (1988) [Seeger plays on four tracks and sings on two of them}
- Tim & Mollie O'Brien - Away On the Mountain (Sugar Hill) (1994) [Seeger plays on one track]
- Tony Trischka - Glory Shone Around: A Christmas Collection [Seeger plays on two tracks and sings on one of them]
- Robert Plant and Alison Krauss – Raising Sand (Rounder) (2007) [Seeger plays on one track]
- Ry Cooder – My Name Is Buddy (Nonesuch) (2007) [Seeger plays on nine tracks]
- Tony Trischka - Territory (Smithsonian Folkways) (2008) [Seeger plays on one track]

== Videography ==
- Elizabeth Cotton & Mike Seeger In Concert (Ramblin', 1991)
- Fret n' Fiddle (Vestapol Productions, 1994)
- Pete Seeger's Family Sing-A-Long (with Pete and Peggy Seeger) (Homespun Videos, 1999)
