= Tom Paley =

Musical artist (1928–2017)

- Born: Allan Thomas Paley; March 19, 1928; New York City, U.S.
- Died: September 30, 2017 (aged 89) Brighton, England
- Occupation: Musician
- Instruments: Guitar; banjo; fiddle; mandolin; autoharp
- Years active: Early 1950s–2017
- Labels: Elektra; Folkways; Topic; Argo; Kicking Mule; Global Village; Wildwood; Gravitation; Hornbeam; CopperCreek
- Formerly of: New Lost City Ramblers
- Website: tompaley.org

Allan Thomas Paley (March 19, 1928 – September 30, 2017) was an American guitarist, banjo and fiddle player. He was best known for his work with the New Lost City Ramblers in the 1950s and 1960s.

== Biography ==
Paley was born on March 19, 1928, and raised in New York City. His parents were left-wing activists, and he grew up hearing spirituals and political songs. After moving with his mother to California for several years in his early teens, he returned to New York and began learning the guitar and banjo, and visiting clubs where singers such as Lead Belly and Josh White performed. He also began performing, both solo and with other musicians including Woody Guthrie, and booking performances for others.

From September 1950 to May 1951 he was a graduate student in the mathematics department of Yale University. After one year he decided to be a musician rather than a mathematician.

In 1953 he recorded his first album Folk Songs of the Southern Appalachian Mountains, for Jac Holzman's then-new Elektra Records. On May 25, 1958, Paley, John Cohen and Mike Seeger played together live on air for John Dildine's weekly folk music radio show on WASH-FM: this was the first appearance of what later became the New Lost City Ramblers. Paley later said:

When we formed The New Lost City Ramblers it was the kind of thing I'd been doing for quite a few years.... It didn't feel particularly revolutionary to me but I understood we had quite an impact on young people like Dylan.

Paley, both as a solo artist and as member of the New Lost City Ramblers, has been cited by many as a source and influence, among them Bob Dylan, and The Grateful Dead. He recorded nine albums as a member of the New Lost City Ramblers between 1958 and 1962.

Paley left the band when Cohen and Seeger wanted the group to become more professional and Paley refused to sign statements about his political allegiances; he was replaced by Tracy Schwarz. He formed another group, the Old Reliable String Band with Roy Berkeley and Artie Rose, before leaving the United States in 1963, when he and his wife Claudia went to live in Sweden. They remained there until 1965 when they moved to England, where Paley had increasingly been working.

Paley subsequently toured widely, in the UK, US, Scandinavia and elsewhere. He also performed as a member of the New Deal String Band, based in London, intermittently since the 1960s. After learning the fiddle, he released two albums of traditional Scandinavian music, On a Cold Winter Night (1993) and Svenska Låtar: Swedish Fiddle Tunes (1998), both recorded with his son Ben. His collaboration with Bert Deivert, Beware Young Ladies!, was released in 2007.

He was the honorary President of the Friends of American Old-Time Music and Dance (FOAOTMAD). Another album, Roll on, Roll on, was released in 2012. He was interviewed on BBC Radio 4's Today programme on July 4, 2012, at the launch party of the new album. On September 30, 2017, Paley died in Brighton, England at the age of 89.

== Discography ==
=== Solo ===
- Folksongs of the Southern Appalachian Mountains (1953)
- Sue Cow (1969)
- Hard Luck Papa. Old Time Picking Styles and Techniques (1976) Joe Locker appears uncredited
- Stern Old Bachelor (1985)
- Old Tom Moore and More (1991)

=== Collaborations ===
Collaboration – Jean Ritchie, Oscar Brand, Tom Paley, Harry and Jeanie West.

- Shivaree! (1955)

Collaboration – Jean Ritchie, Oscar Brand and Tom Paley.

- Courtin's A Pleasure (1955)

The New Lost City Ramblers (John Cohen, Tom Paley, Mike Seeger).

- The New Lost City Ramblers (1958)
- The New Lost City Ramblers Volume II (1959)
- Songs From The Depression (1959)
- Old-Timey Songs For Children (1959)
- The New Lost City Ramblers Volume 3 (1961)
- Tom Paley, John Cohen, Mike Seeger sing songs of The New Lost City Ramblers (1961)
- The New Lost City Ramblers (7-inch EP) (1961)
- Earth Is Earth (as the New Lost City Bang Boys) (7-inch EP) (1961)
- The New Lost City Ramblers Volume 4 (1962)
- American Moonshine And Prohibition (1962)
- The New Lost City Ramblers Volume 5 (1963)

Collaboration – Eric Weissberg, Tom Paley, Art Rosenbaum, Marshall Brickman.

- Folk Banjo Styles (1962)

Old Reliable String Band (Tom Paley, Roy Berkeley and Artie Rose).

- The Old Reliable String Band (1962)

Collaboration – Tom Paley and Peggy Seeger with Claudia Paley.

- Who's Going to Shoe Your Pretty Little Foot? Topic (1964) now available as a download.

In 2009 Girl on the Green Briar Shore, track sixteen from this album was included in Topic Records 70 year anniversary boxed set Three Score and Ten as track five on the seventh CD.

The New Deal String Band (Tom Paley, Joe Locker, Janet Kerr).

- Down in the Willow (1969)

Cyril Tawney

- Children's Songs From Devon And Cornwall (1969)
- A Mayflower Garland (1970)

The New Deal String Band (Tom Paley, Joe Locker, Ben Paley).

- Dealing a New Hand (from the Same Old Deck) (1999)

The Mysterious Redbirds (Tom Paley, James Reams, Bill Christophersen).

- 1992-1998 (2000)

Collaboration – Tom and Ben Paley.

- Svenska Låtar (1998)
- On A Cold Winter Night (recorded 1989) (1993)
- Paley & Son (Hornbeam Recordings, 2015)

Collaboration – Tom Paley with Barbara Lester and Ben Paley.

- Heartsease (1991)
- Separate Ways (1993)

Collaboration – Tom Paley, featuring Bert Deivert

- Beware Young Ladies! (Gravitation 023, Sweden) (2007)

Tom Paley's Old-Time Moonshine Revue

- "Roll On, Roll On" (Hornbeam Recordings, 2012)
