= Thomas Maupin =

American serial killer and rapist

Thomas Edward Maupin
- Born: Thomas Edward Maupin; October 9, 1949 (age 76); Louisiana, U.S.
- Convictions: Washington: First-degree murder, reduced to second-degree murder Tennessee: Voluntary manslaughter x2 First-degree rape
- Penalty: Washington: 40 years; commuted to 12 years imprisonment Tennessee: 12 years (murders); 8 years (rape)

Details
- Victims: 3
- Span of crimes: 1988–2001
- Country: United States
- States: Washington, Tennessee
- Date apprehended: For the final time in 2017
- Imprisoned at: Trousdale Turner Correctional Center, Hartsville, Tennessee

Thomas Edward Maupin (born October 9, 1949) is an American serial killer and rapist. An itinerant criminal with a history of violent crimes, he was tried and convicted for the 1988 murder of a 6-year-old girl in Washington. Maupin was later linked to the cold case murders of two women in Tennessee in 2001. He pleaded guilty to two counts of voluntary manslaughter and sentenced to 12 years imprisonment, to be served with an eight-year sentence for an unrelated rape.

== Early life and crimes ==
Little is known about Maupin's early life. Born on October 9, 1949, in Louisiana, his family moved to Ohio shortly after his birth, where he subsequently grew up. Maupin started committing crimes at an early age, varying from thefts, robberies, sexual assaults and child molestation, which he committed across various states. Before moving to Spokane, Washington, he had escaped custody on three separate occasions and had been designated as a fugitive by the federal authorities on two occasions, but the exact charges are currently unknown.

== Murder of Tricna Cloy ==
On January 25, 1988, Maupin attended a house party in Spokane, where he came across a woman named Tina Fraijo, who was with her two children. After partying for some time, he escorted Fraijo and the children back to their house. When Fraijo woke up on the following morning, she found that one of her children, 6-year-old Tricna Cloy, had gone missing. Suspecting that Maupin might have something to do with it, she immediately contacted the authorities and a large-scale manhunt began for him. Volunteers from the local community aided the authorities in their search, some of whom climbed the mountain range in nearby Minnehaha in an attempt to trace Maupin, but only managed to discover a supposed campsite he had been using. In the meantime, Spokane authorities charged him with an unrelated sexual assault for November 30 fondling of an underage girl.

The search for Cloy continued for several months, with some sympathetic locals contributing to a reward fund in an attempt to gather information about her whereabouts. In the meantime, Maupin had been arrested in Alabama in a stolen car on February 18, and ten days later, he was extradited back to Spokane to face charges for the molestation of the other little girl. He was acquitted of that crime in April, and since he insisted he had nothing to do with Cloy's disappearance, the authorities had no choice but to release him for the time being.

On June 9, some children playing at a gravel pit in the eastern edge of Spokane found a skull and clumps of human hair, and after reporting it to the authorities, speculations arose that the remains could possibly belong to Cloy. Two days later, using dental records and the leftover clothing left on the body, coroners were conclusively able to identify the decedent as Tricna Cloy. With the remains identified, detectives sought to file murder charges against Maupin, but were told by the prosecutor's office to keep gathering evidence so they could make a better case when he was arrested.

=== Arrest, guilty plea, and release ===
Maupin's arrest came on January 11, 1989, shortly after he had phoned a former employer and requested that a tax form be mailed to an apartment in Akron, Ohio, which he shared with his ex-wife. Using this information, authorities tracked him down, arrested and charged him with Cloy's murder.

In 1990, Maupin was found guilty of first-degree murder and sentenced to 40 years imprisonment, but the sentence was overturned by the Washington Court of Appeals after it ruled that the jury's verdict was flawed because it was not specific enough. Maupin was found guilty at a second trial in May 1992 and was given the same sentence, but this was overturned as well in 1996, after the Washington Supreme Court ruled that the trial judge had unlawfully prevented a witness on the defense's side from testifying.

At the third trial, which began in July 1997, one of the prosecution's main witnesses - Cloy's younger brother, Elston - suddenly admitted that he had lied under oath in both trials and that his eyewitness account of the day had been falsified. Fearing a possible acquittal for the defendant, prosecutors decided to offer Maupin's attorney a plea bargain - in exchange for lowering the charges from first-degree to second-degree murder, he would plead guilty and instead be sentenced to 12 years imprisonment. While Maupin continued to insist on his innocence, he accepted the plea deal and was given 12 years imprisonment - however, with him having time reduced for good behavior and being given time served, he was due to be released two weeks after sentencing. In mid-September 1997, Maupin was released from prison and moved to the Southeast, where his wife had moved to sometime prior.

== New crimes ==
In August 2001, while walking along an industrial area in Memphis, Tennessee, Maupin came across a 31-year-old woman walking opposite him. He accosted her and dragged her off the road, where he threatened her with some sort of sharp object before forcing the woman to perform oral sex on him. Before escaping, Maupin accidentally dropped his dentures - which had his name inscribed on them - on the ground. When examining the crime scene, these dentures were picked up by officers, but were not properly examined and simply stashed away in a rape kit that went untested for the time being.

In early October, Maupin went to Harpo's, a bar in the Frayser neighborhood of Memphis, where he would often pick up women and pay them for sex. On this occasion, he hooked up with 46-year-old Nancy Carol Alvis, whom he strangled under unclear circumstances and then dumped in a weeded area. On October 20, he picked up another woman, 37-year-old Patricia Cook Thornton, and after having sex with her, he proceeded to stab her to death before dumping her body in the same area as Alvis'. Their decomposing corpses were found within days of one another and Maupin was immediately considered the prime suspect, but could not be arrested due to a lack of sufficient evidence for a murder charge.

== Identification, arrest and plea deals ==
In 2013, mayor A C Wharton announced an initiative to clear the backlog of untested rape kits in Memphis, a project that would cost up to an estimated $6.5 million. Among the rape kits tested was the one that contained the dentures, and in 2017, forensic technicians were able to get a partial match to Maupin, who was immediately arrested and charged with the rape. He pleaded guilty in exchange for a reduced sentence and was given 8 years imprisonment, whereupon he was transferred to the Trousdale Turner Correctional Center in Hartsville.

Three years later, Maupin was linked to the murders of Alvis and Thornton, and subsequently indicted in their murders. His arrest came as a relief to family members and relatives of both women, all of whom said they were excited to have their loved ones' killings solved. In April 2021, Maupin accepted another plea deal with the prosecutors, pleading guilty to two charges of voluntary manslaughter in exchange for a 12-year sentence to be served concurrently with his rape sentence.

As of December 2022, Maupin continues to serve his sentence, with his earliest chance for parole being scheduled for 2023.

== See also ==
- List of serial killers in the United States
