= New Lost City Ramblers =

American old-time string band (1958–2019)

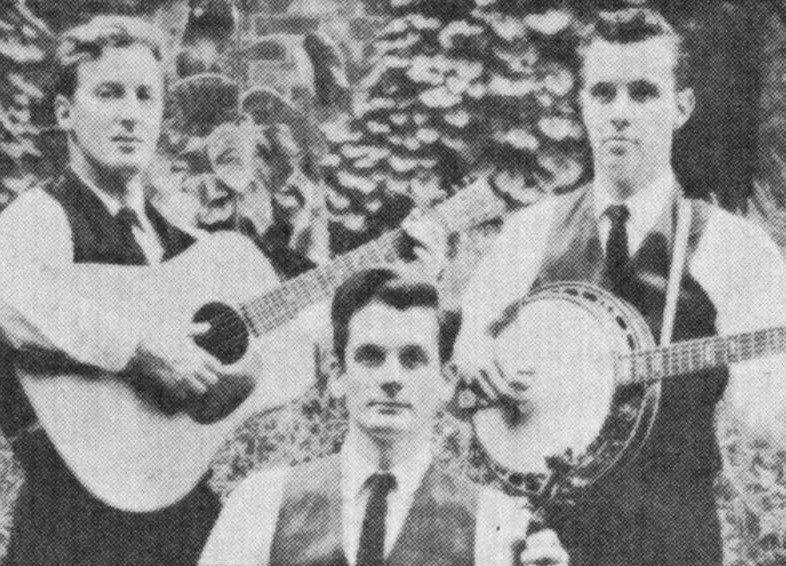
- in the 1960s

Background information
- Origin: New York City, New York, United States
- Genres: Old-time, folk
- Years active: 1958–2019
- Labels: Folkways, Flying Fish, Vanguard, Rounder Select
- Past members: Mike Seeger; John Cohen; Tom Paley; Tracy Schwarz

The New Lost City Ramblers, or NLCR, was an American contemporary old-time string band that formed in New York City in 1958 during the folk revival. Mike Seeger, John Cohen and Tom Paley were its founding members. Tracy Schwarz replaced Paley, who left the group in 1962. Seeger died of cancer in 2009, Paley died in 2017, Cohen died in 2019, and Schwarz died in 2025. NLCR participated in the old-time music revival, and directly influenced many later musicians.

== Career ==
The Ramblers distinguished themselves by focusing on the traditional playing styles they heard on old 78rpm records of musicians recorded during the 1920s and 1930s, many of whom had earlier appeared on the Anthology of American Folk Music. The New Lost City Ramblers refused to "sanitize" these southern sounds as did other folk groups of the time, such as the Weavers or Kingston Trio. Instead, the Ramblers have always strived for an authentic sound. However, the Ramblers did not merely copy the old recordings that inspired them. Rather, they would use the various old-time styles they encountered while at the same time not becoming slaves to imitation.

The Ramblers named themselves in response to a request by Moe Asch, based on an amalgam of a favorite tune, J. E. Mainer's "New Lost Train Blues"; a favorite group, Charlie Poole and the North Carolina Ramblers; and a reference to the urban settings in which they played old-timey music.

On Songs from the Depression, the New Lost City Ramblers performed a variety of popular political songs from the New Deal days, all but one of them taken from commercially issued 78s. This exception was the song "Keep Moving", identified in the album notes only as "from Tony Schwartz's collection — singer unidentified". The song was actually performed by Agnes "Sis" Cunningham, the full title being "How Can You Keep On Moving (Unless You Migrate Too)".

The Rambler's omission later caused Ry Cooder, who listened to the Ramblers album, to record the song as Traditional on the first edition of his Into the Purple Valley album, an omission he gladly corrected when informed of it. Cooder also covered another song from the same New Lost City Ramblers album, which he may have heard on a poorly labeled cassette copy: "Taxes on the Farmer Feeds Us All" which the New Lost City Ramblers credit to Fiddling John Carson but which the Cooder notes still list as "traditional". The same is true of the track "Boomer's Story", covered by the Ramblers—Cooder credits it as "traditional", but the song was written by Carson Robison and first recorded by him in 1929 under the title "The Railroad Boomer".

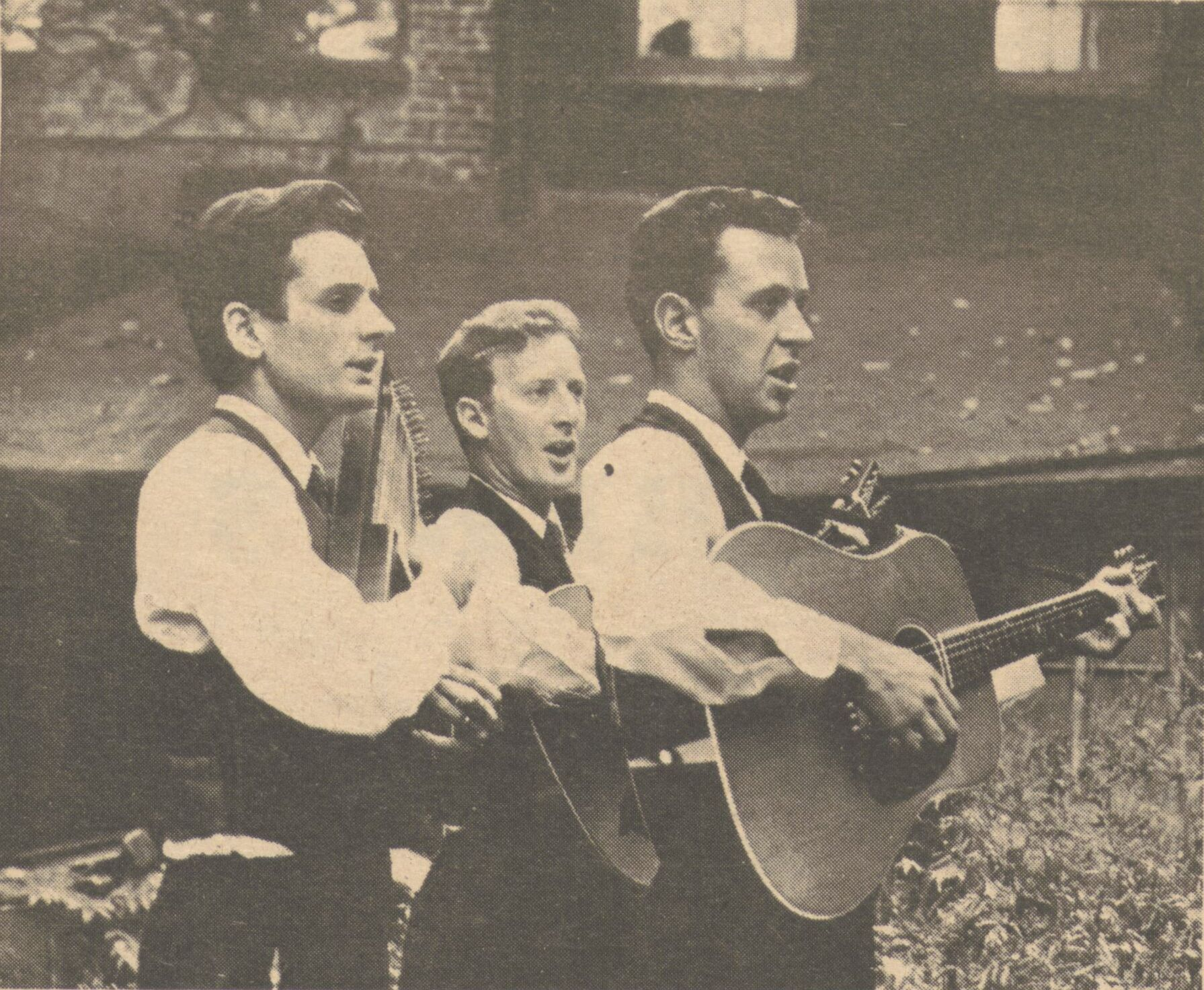
New Lost City Ramblers, c. 1968

In his autobiography, Chronicles: Volume One, Bob Dylan described the impression the Ramblers made on him when he heard their records in 1960:

Everything about them appealed to me—their style, their singing, their sound. I liked the way they looked, the way they dressed and I especially liked their name. Their songs ran the gamut in style, everything from mountain ballads to fiddle tunes and railway blues... I'd stay with the Ramblers for days. At the time, I didn't know they were replicating everything they did off old 78 records, but what would it have mattered anyway? It wouldn't have mattered at all. They had originality in spades, were men of mystery. I couldn't listen to them enough.

The group drifted apart during the latter half of the 1960s. Schwarz and Seeger performed with different musicians and together formed the short lived Strange Creek Singers.

The New Lost City Ramblers' extensive recordings for the Folkways label became, after the death of Moe Asch, part of the Smithsonian Institution, which reissues Folkways titles on CD.

John Cohen is said to have inspired the titular John of the Grateful Dead's 1970 song "Uncle John's Band".

== Discography ==
- The New Lost City Ramblers (1958) (Folkways Records)
- Songs from the Depression (1959) (Folkways)
- Old-Timey Songs For Children (1959) (Folkways)
- The New Lost City Ramblers Vol. II (1960) (Folkways)
- The New Lost City Ramblers Vol. III (1961) (Folkways)
- Tom Paley, John Cohen, Mike Seeger Sing Songs of The New Lost City Ramblers (1961)
- The New Lost City Ramblers (1961)
- Earth Is Earth Sung by The New Lost City Bang Boys (1961) (Folkways)
- The New Lost City Ramblers Vol. 4 (1962) (Folkways)
- American Moonshine & Prohibition (1962) (Folkways)
- The New Lost City Ramblers Vol. 5 (1963) (Folkways)
- Gone to the Country (1963) (Folkways)
- Radio Special # 1 (1963)
- The New New Lost City Ramblers with Tracy Schwarz: Gone to the Country (1963) (Folkways)
- String Band Instrumentals (1964) (Folkways)
- Old Timey Music (1964)
- Rural Delivery No. 1 (1965) (Folkways)
- Remembrance of Things to Come (1966) (Folkways)
- Modern Times (1968) (Folkways)
- The New Lost City Ramblers with Cousin Emmy (1968) (Folkways)
- On the Great Divide (1975) (Folkways)
- 20th Anniversary Concert (1978) (Flying Fish)
- 20 Years-Concert Performances (1978) (Flying Fish)
- Tom Paley, John Cohen, and Mike Seeger Sing Songs of the New Lost City Ramblers (1978) (Folkways)
- Old Time Music (1994) (Vanguard)
- The Early Years, 1958-1962 (1991) (Smithsonian Folkways)
- Out Standing In Their Field-Vol. II, 1963-1973 (1993) (Smithsonian Folkways)
- There Ain't No Way Out (1997) (Smithsonian Folkways)
- 40 Years of Concert Performances (Rounder Select) (2001)
- 50 Years: Where Do You Come From? Where Do You Go? (2009) (Smithsonian Folkways)

Mike Seeger solo albums

- The Second Annual Farewell Reunion (1973) (Mercury) [His band plays on one track]
- Third Annual Farewell Reunion (1994) (Rounder) [His band plays on one track]
