= Fiddlesticks =

Traditional instruments

The Cantrells (Al and Emily Cantrell) playing fiddlesticks

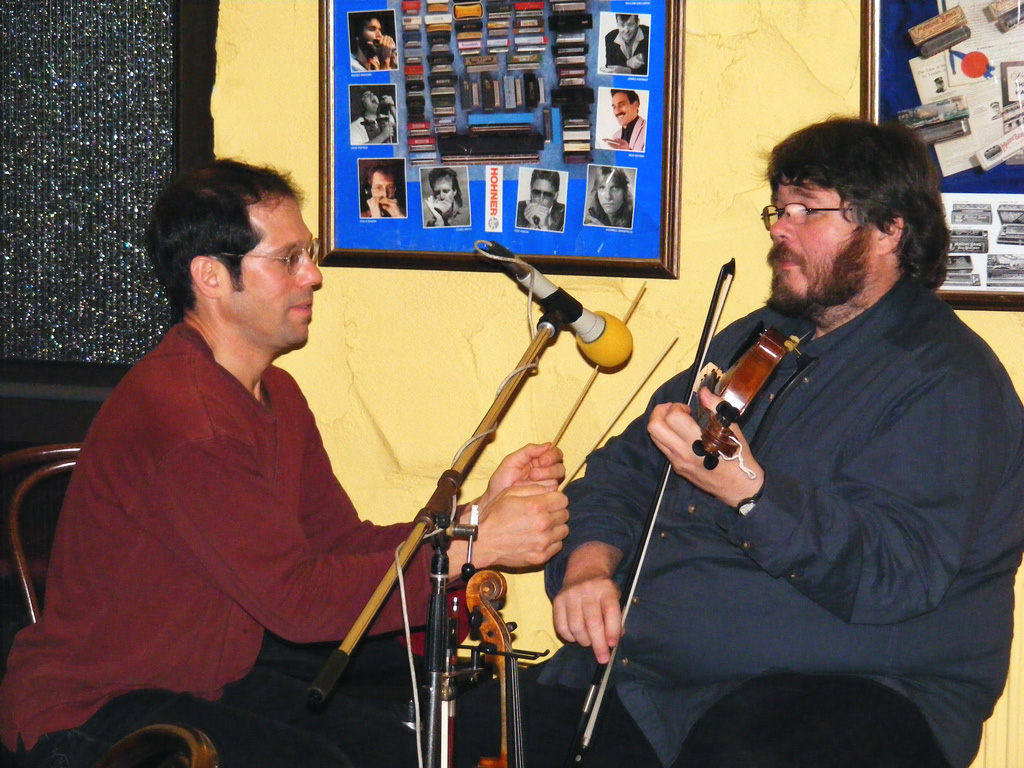
Ira Bernstein playing fiddlesticks with Riley Baugus

Fiddlesticks are traditional instruments used to add percussion to old-time and Cajun fiddle music, allowing two people to play the fiddle at the same time. While the fiddler plays in normal fashion, a second person uses a pair of straws, sticks, or knitting needles to tap out a rhythm on the strings over the upper fingerboard (between the bow and the fiddler's fingering hand).

Also called "beating the straws" or "playing the straws," this technique probably arose in the eastern United States. British folklorist Fred McCormick reports that he has never encountered it among British and Irish fiddlers, and suggests that it may have arisen on American plantations as a substitute for African musical instruments. The technique has become rarer over time as the music has changed, but numerous examples have been recorded, for example in the "Mardi Gras Jig" by a group led by Cajun fiddler and singer Dewey Balfa, or by Al and Emily Cantrell.
