= Alice Gerrard =

American bluegrass singer, banjoist, and guitar player (born 1934)

- Born: July 8, 1934 (age 92); Seattle, Washington
- Genres: Bluegrass, folk music
- Instruments: vocals, guitar, fiddle, banjo
- Labels: Rounder, Folkways, Arhoolie
- Website: alicegerrard.com

Alice Gerrard (born July 8, 1934) is an American bluegrass and old-time music performer, writer, editor and teacher. As a singer who plays guitar, fiddle and banjo, she performed and recorded solo and in ensembles, notably in a duo with Hazel Dickens.

In the 2020s, she has continued to perform and record, was the subject of a documentary film by Kenny Dalsheimer, You Gave Me a Song, and has been a frequent staff member at the Augusta Heritage Center in West Virginia, the Port Townsend, Washington Festival of American Fiddle Tunes and other summer music camps and festivals across the United States. Gerrard was born in Seattle, Washington. Her mother was from Yakima, Washington, and her father from Wigan in England. Gerrard attended Antioch College, where she was exposed to folk music. After college, she moved to Washington, D.C., and became part of the thriving bluegrass scene there. Gerrard was married to Jeremy Foster who died in a car accident in 1964. She had four children with him. She was later married to Mike Seeger and recorded two albums with him. Mike and Alice had a band called Strange Creek Singers and the other members in that band were Hazel Dickens, Tracy Schwarz, and Lamar Grier. They recorded one album. Alice Gerrard and Virgie Worrell Richardson were in Matokie Slaughter’s group, the Back Creek Buddies. They recorded one album, too.

Gerrard was inducted into the Bluegrass Hall of Fame in 2017.

The Alice Gerrard Collection (1954–2000) is located in the Southern Folklife Collection of the Wilson Library of the University of North Carolina at Chapel Hill.

She founded and was editor-in-chief of The Old Time Herald magazine from 1987 to 2000. In June 2026, CBS News included her song Calling Me Home in its list of the 250 essential American songs of the past 250 years.

== Discography ==
=== Alice Gerrard ===
- 1994 – Pieces of My Heart (Copper Creek Records)
- 2002 – Calling Me Home: Songs of Love and Loss (Copper Creek Records)
- 2013 – Bittersweet (Spruce And Maple)
- 2014 – Follow the Music (Tompkins Square)
- 2023 – Sun to Sun (Sleepy Cat)

=== With Hazel Dickens ===
- 1965 – Who's That Knocking (Folkways LP)
- 1973 – Hazel & Alice (Rounder LP)
- 1973 – Won't You Come & Sing for Me (Folkways LP)
- 1976 – Hazel Dickens and Alice Gerrard (Rounder LP)
- 1996 – Pioneering Women of Bluegrass (Smithsonian Folkways)
- 2018 – Sing Me Back Home: The DC Tapes, 1965-1969 (Free Dirt Records)

=== With Mike Seeger ===
- 1970 – Mike and Alice Seeger Live in Japan (King LP)
- 1980 – Alice Gerrard & Mike Seeger (Greenhays LP) [reissued in its entirety on Bowling Green CD on 5-String Productions, 2008]

=== Strange Creek Singers ===
- 1970 - Strange Creek Singers (Arhoolie Records)

=== The Back Creek Buddies ===
- 1990 - Saro (w/ Matokie Slaughter) (Marimac Recordings)

=== Tom, Brad & Alice ===
- 1998 – Been There Still
- 2000 – Holly Ding
- 2001 – We'll Die in the Pig Pen Fighting
- 2005 – Carve That Possum

=== With Gail Gillespie and Sharon Sandomirsky ===
- 2007 – The Road to Agate Hill: Music from Southwest Virginia and Beyond

=== With Andy Cahan ===
- 2025 - Galax Years 1981-1987

=== Compilations ===
- 1979 – Elizabeth Cotten, Volume 3: When I'm Gone (Folkways Records)
- 1997 – Close to Home: Old Time Music from Mike Seeger's Collection, 1952–967 (Smithsonian Folkways)
- 2001 – There is No Eye: Music for Photographs (Smithsonian Folkways)
- 2002 – Classic Mountain Songs from Smithsonian Folkways (Smithsonian Folkways)
- 2002 – Classic Bluegrass from Smithsonian Folkways (Smithsonian Folkways)
- 2005 – Classic Bluegrass Vol. 2 from Smithsonian Folkways (Smithsonian Folkways)

== Books ==
- Gerrard, Alice. Custom Made Woman: A Life in Traditional Music (University of North Carolina Press, 2025).

== Films ==
- Homemade American Music Directed by Yasha Aginsky, Carrie Aginsky. Copyright: 1980.
- Hazel Dickens: It's Hard to Tell the Singer from the Song (2001). Directed by Mimi Pickering. Whitesburg, Kentucky: Appalshop.
- You Gave Me a Song: The Life and Music of Alice Gerrard (2019). Directed by Kenny Dalsheimer. Durham, North Carolina: The Groove Productions.

== Other ==
Her name appears in the lyrics of the Le Tigre song "Hot Topic."
