= Old-time music =

Genre of folk music

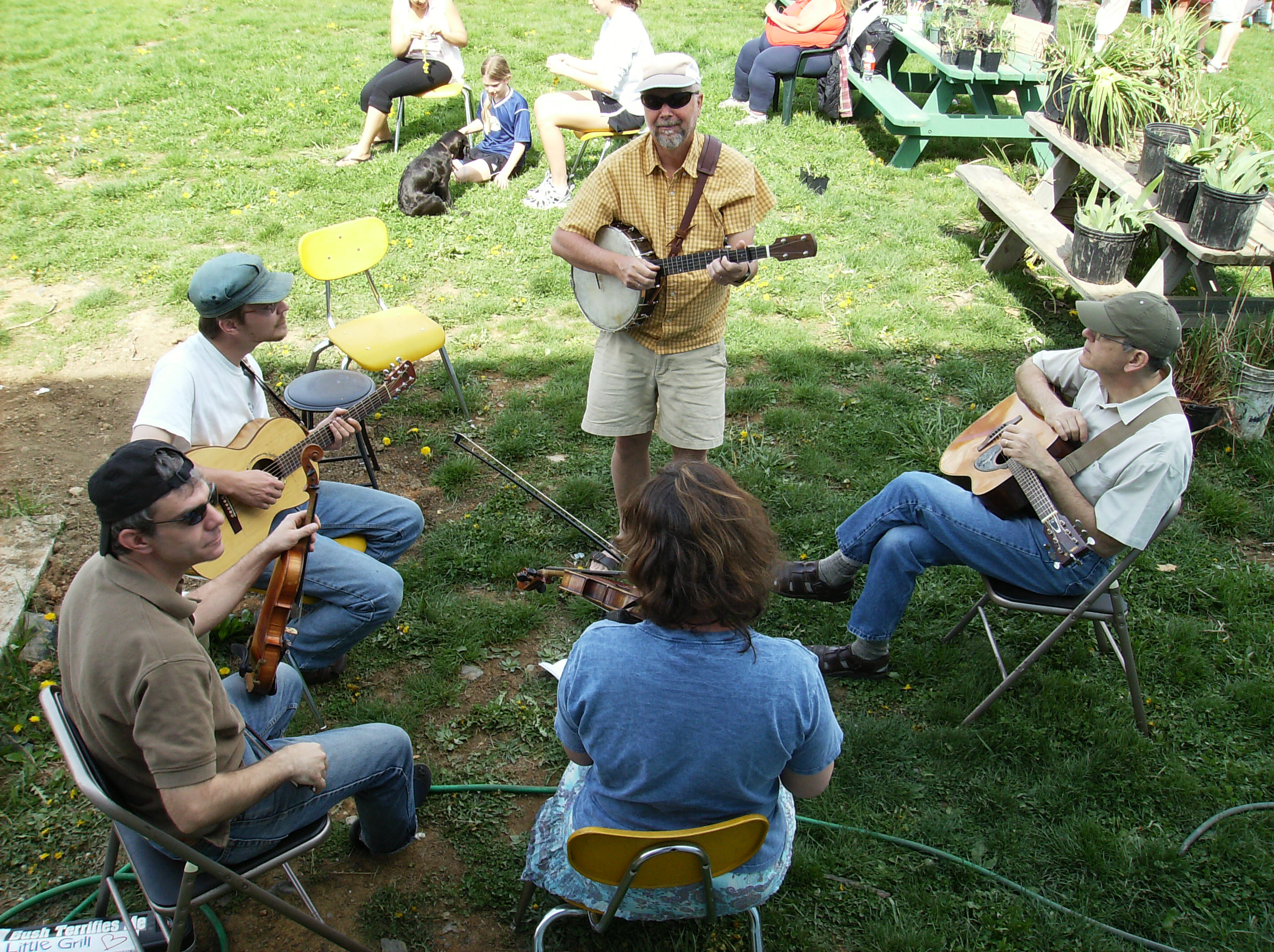
- Old-time country band The Lotus Eaters perform at the Our Community Place plant sale.
- Stylistic origins: North American folk music, Appalachian music
- Cultural origins: English, Scottish, Welsh, Irish, French, German, Spanish, African, Native American
- Derivative forms: Bluegrass, country, Cajun fiddle

Other topics
- American folk music revival

Old-time music is a genre of North American folk music. It developed along with various North American folk dances, such as square dancing, contra dancing and buck dancing. It is played on acoustic instruments, generally centering on a combination of fiddle (see old time fiddling) and plucked string instruments, most often the 5-string banjo without a resonator pan, guitar, and mandolin. Together, they form an ensemble called the string band, which along with the simple banjo–fiddle duet have historically been the most common configurations to play old-time music. The genre is considered by some to be a precursor to modern country music, but it also has a contemporary active subculture of musicians in various parts of the United States. Old-time music can generally be distinguished from the more widely known bluegrass genre by the use of cross-tunings on the fiddle, by all melody instruments playing in unison, by a lack of individual instruments taking breaks to improvise, by sessions remaining in one tuning or key for an extended period (because fiddles and banjos are tuned especially for that key or even for one tune), and by banjos being frailed instead of finger-picked and lacking resonators, giving them a softer, mellower sound. In contrast, bluegrass banjos usually have a resonator pan attached (making them louder) and are typically played 3-finger-style with steel finger picks.

== History ==
Reflecting the cultures that settled North America, the roots of old-time music are in the traditional musics of the British Isles, Europe, and Africa. African influences are notably found in vocal and instrumental performance styles and dance, as well as the often cited use of the banjo; in some regions, Native American, Spanish, French and German sources are also prominent. While many dance tunes and ballads can be traced to European sources, many others are of North American origin.

=== Etymology ===
Old-time music, particularly when encompassing ballads and other vocal forms, is likely the oldest form of North American traditional music other than Native American music, and thus the term "old-time" is an appropriate one. In popular usage at 21st century fiddlers' conventions and summer music camps, it frequently describes styles of pre-bluegrass fiddle and banjo music as played in the Southern United States, so that "bluegrass banjo" and "bluegrass fiddle" can be judged separately. However, definitions of the phrase vary historically and geographically, including racially segregated titles used in record catalogs of the 1920s and 1930s, literal use to describe nostalgic song and tune collections over the years, and concert organizers' and record companies' use of the phrase in the 1960s to identify traditional instrumental and vocal music by rural white and black musicians, distinct from the then-commercialized "folk revival" music that included urban "interpreters" and singer-songwriters (See "Revival" below).

Contemporary fiddler's conventions, music camps and festivals often use the terms "old-time" and "old-time string band" interchangeably, heavily weighted toward instrumental performance and often placing vocal music in a separate folk song category.

When some of its early country music recordings became hits, the Okeh company, which had previously coined the terms "hillbilly music" to describe Appalachian and Southern fiddle-based and religious music and "race record" to describe the music of African American recording artists, began using "old-time music" as a term to describe the music of white artists including Fiddlin' John Carson, who began recording in 1923.

The term thus originated as a euphemism, but proved a suitable replacement for other terms that were considered disparaging by many inhabitants of these regions. It remains the term preferred by performers and listeners of the music. It is sometimes referred to as "old-timey" or "mountain music" by long-time practitioners.

=== Other sources ===
The early 19th century Minstrel Show configuration of banjo, fiddle, rhythm bones and tambourine, at first performing tunes learned from black players, soon added tunes adapted from white players previous European-roots repertoire, and songs composed specifically for those ensembles, such as those of Stephen Foster, some of which are still in the old-time string band repertoire. During the late 19th and early 20th centuries, the guitar and mandolin became increasingly available, as well as factory made banjos, and tunes originating in Tin Pan Alley, gospel, ragtime, blues and other musics were adapted into the old-time style. People played similar music in all regions of the United States in the 18th and 19th centuries, but by the mid 20th century it was associated primarily with rural areas, particularly the Appalachian region.

=== Revival ===
Important revivalists including Mike Seeger and Pete Seeger brought banjo and string-band music to New York City as early as the 1940s. The New Lost City Ramblers in particular took the revival across the country and often featured older musicians in their shows. The band was originally Mike Seeger, John Cohen, and Tom Paley. When Tom left the band, he was replaced by Tracy Schwarz. New Lost City Ramblers sparked new interest in "old-time" or "old-timey" music, and wrote about it in record notes, magazine articles, and the New Lost City Ramblers Songbook, later reissued as the Old-Time String Band Songbook.

Folkways Records, founded in 1948, began to use the phrase "old time music" prominently in conjunction with Mike Seeger, the New Lost City Ramblers, other performers (e.g., Canadian fiddler Jean Carignan), and events ("The 37th Old Time Fiddler's Convention at Union Grove North Carolina"), including a 1960s New York City organization called the "Friends of Old-Time Music" (F.O.T.M. for short), with headquarters at Izzy Young's Folklore Center in Greenwich Village. The group's mission, as outlined in Richard Rinzler's booklet accompanying a concert collection, was to "reach deep into the grassroots and bring traditional folk music, performed by traditional artists, to the New York City area." Under its "Old-Time Music" umbrella, rather than the phrase "folk music" then being used heavily by commercial record companies and young singer-songwriters, the group presented a wide range of older black and white traditional and "roots" musicians, including Southern singers, fiddlers, banjo players, guitarists and string bands in styles ranging from unaccompanied and banjo-accompanied ballad-singing to bluegrass and blues artists, some of whom had recorded as early as the 1920s. (Among the concert performers were Clarence Ashley, Dock Boggs, Gus Cannon, Jesse Fuller, Roscoe Holcomb, Mississippi John Hurt, Furry Lewis, Bill Monroe, the Stanley Brothers, and Doc Watson.)

A 2006 three-CD box set from Folkways reissued more of the original 14 concerts, under the title "Friends of Old Time Music: The Folk Arrival 1961-1965," accompanied by a 60-page book by Peter K. Siegel, with essays by John Cohen and Jody Stecher. Among its observations, "When Ralph Rinzler, Cohen and Young decided to call their new organization the Friends of Old Time Music, they were referring to language that had been used by the commercial recording industry almost four decades earlier." In a separate essay, Cohen observes, "Ralph and I looked for name for our proposed organization, one that would avoid the pitfalls of the word 'folk,' for we needed to establish our own distinct identity as something apart from the folk revival," with its "commercialization of folk music by the music industry" and "urban performers who were interpreting and inventing folk music".

Vanguard Records used "Old Time Music at Newport" as the title for one of its several LPs from the Newport Folk Festival of 1963, including several Southern players who had performed at FOTM concerts and Folkways records, and others: Clarence "Tom" Ashley, Doc Boggs, Maybelle Carter, Jenes Cottrell, Dorsey Dixon, Clint Howard, Fred Price, and Doc Watson. The New Lost City Ramblers were included on a "Country Music and Bluegrass at Newport" record, and Mississippi John Hurt was among performers on "Blues at Newport." Ashley, whose band featured Doc Watson, appeared on both the "Old Time" and "Country Music and Bluegrass" collections.

Arhoolie Records in 1962 started a label called "Old Timey," reissuing dozens of LPs based on old 78s by old-time string bands and more – not only volumes of "Old-Time Southern Dance Music: Ballads And Songs," but "Pioneers Of Cajun Accordion 1926-1936," "Amadé Ardoin* – The First Black Zydeco Recording Artist (His Original Recordings 1928-1938)," "Classic Country Duets," and collections of "Western Swing, Blues, Boogie And Honky Tonk."

== Instrumentation ==
Old-time music is played using a wide variety of stringed instruments. The instrumentation of an old-time group is often determined by what instruments are available, as well as by tradition. The most common instruments are acoustic string instruments. Historically, the fiddle was nearly always the leading melodic instrument, and in many instances (if no other instruments were available) dances were accompanied only by a single fiddler, who often also acted as dance caller.

By the early 19th century, the banjo had become an essential partner to the fiddle, particularly in the southern United States. The banjo, originally a fretless instrument made from a gourd, provided rhythmic accompaniment to song, dance and the fiddle, incorporating a high drone provided by the instrument's short "drone string." The banjo used in old-time music is typically a 5-string model with an open back (i.e., without the resonator found on most bluegrass banjos). Today, old-time banjo players most commonly utilize the clawhammer style, but there were numerous styles, most of which are still used to some extent today. The major styles are down-picking (generally referred to today as "clawhammer," though historically myriad names were used to describe it), two-finger index lead, two-finger thumb lead, and a three-finger "fiddle style" that seems to have been influenced in part by late-19th century urban classical style. Young players might learn whatever style a parent or older sibling favored, or take inspiration from phonograph records, radio, traveling performers and migrant workers, local guitarists and banjo players, as well as other musicians they met when traveling to neighboring areas. Having a fiddle play the lead melody with a banjo playing rhythmic accompaniment is the most common form of Appalachian old-time music today.

Individualistic three-finger styles were developed independently by such important figures as Uncle Dave Macon, Dock Boggs, and Snuffy Jenkins. Those early three-finger styles, especially the technique developed by Jenkins, led to the three-finger Scruggs style created by Earl Scruggs in the 1940s, which helped advance the split between the old-time genre and the solo-centric style that became known as bluegrass. Jenkins developed a three-finger "roll" method that, while obviously part of the old-time tradition, inspired Scruggs to develop the smoother, faster and more complex rolls that are now standard fare in bluegrass music.

In the 19th and early 20th centuries, musicians began to add other stringed instruments to the fiddle-banjo duo—including guitar, mandolin, and double bass (or washtub bass). These provided chordal, bass line, and pitched rhythmic accompaniment, and occasionally took over the melody, usually during a "break" section that lasted the duration of a verse, refrain, or verse and refrain. This, along with a Dobro (resonator guitar), is also considered 'standard' bluegrass instrumentation, but old-time music tends to focus on sparser instrumentation and arrangements compared to bluegrass. Such an assemblage, of whatever instrumentation, became known simply as a "string band." Less frequently used are the cello, piano, hammered dulcimer, Appalachian dulcimer, tenor banjo, tenor guitar, lap-steel guitar, mandola, mouth bow, as well as other instruments such as the jug, harmonica, autoharp, jaw harp, concertina, button or accordion, washboard, spoons, or bones.

The fiddle is sometimes played by two people at the same time, with one player using the bow and fingers, while another player stands to the side and taps out a rhythm on the fiddle strings using small sticks called fiddlesticks (also spelled "fiddle sticks"). This technique (also sometimes called "beating the straws") is utilized in performance most notably by the duo of Al and Emily Cantrell.

Each regional old-time tradition accompanies different dance styles. Some of these include clogging and flatfoot dancing (Appalachia), contra dancing (New England), square dancing (Southern states) and step dancing (Nova Scotia, particularly Cape Breton Island), though there is some overlap between regions.

== Regional styles ==
There are numerous regional styles of old-time music, each with its own repertoire and playing style. Nevertheless, some tunes (such as "Soldier's Joy") are found in nearly every regional style, though played somewhat differently in each.

=== Appalachia ===
"Big Eyed Rabbit"
Matokie Slaughter, "Big Eyed Rabbit" from Clawhammer Banjo, Volume Two (County Records) (c. 1960s)

Appalachian folk music was derived from music brought by English and Scottish settlers and African-American slaves and settlers. In turn it influenced country music and old-time music.

As a result of the terrain of the region, the societies and cultures were fairly isolated from outside intervention. In 1916, Cecil Sharp arrived in Appalachia and began recording the folk songs on the Mountains. Sharp, an authority on British ballads, was able to identify 1,600 versions of 500 songs from 281 singers, almost all having their origins in the English/Scottish Child Ballads. After his first study in Appalachia, he published English Folk Songs from the Southern Appalachians. Some examples of songs preserved in the Appalachian Mountains and recorded by Sharp include, "The Hangman Song", "Barbara Allen", etc. The primary sources for many of Sharp's recordings came from a string of related families around Shelton Laurel, N.C. Of note is the fact that these families maintained a specific, unique vocal tradition and traditional English lyrical pronunciations across several generations, until gaining fame in the 1960s and 1970s through similar field recordings completed by John Cohen. These records featured Dillard Chandler, Berzilla Wallin (recorded by Sharp) and Dellie Norton. Relatives of those individuals continue to keep this unique vocal style alive to this day.

Scottish fiddler Niel Gow is usually credited with developing (during the 1740s) the short bow sawstroke technique that defines Appalachian fiddling. This technique was altered during the next century, with European waltzes and polkas being most influential.

African Americans, who were not only slaves but also free blacks working in timber, coal mining, and other industries, influenced Appalachian music as the banjo was adopted from African Americans by white musicians (such as Joel Walker Sweeney) in the years leading up to the Civil War.

Appalachian folk became a major influence on styles like country music and bluegrass. It is one of the few regional styles of old-time music that, since World War II, has been learned and widely practiced in all areas of the United States and Canada (as well as in Europe, Australia, and elsewhere). In some cases (as in the Midwest and Northeast), its popularity has eclipsed the indigenous old-time traditions of these regions. There is a particularly high concentration of performers playing Appalachian folk music on the East and West Coasts (especially in New York City, Los Angeles, San Francisco, and the Pacific Northwest). A number of American classical composers, in particular Henry Cowell and Aaron Copland, have composed works that merge the idioms of Appalachian folk music with the Old World–based classical tradition.

Appalachian old-time music is itself made up of regional traditions. Some of the most prominent traditions include those of North Georgia (the Skillet Lickers) Mount Airy, North Carolina (specifically the Round Peak style of Tommy Jarrell) and Grayson County/Galax, Virginia (Wade Ward and Albert Hash), West Virginia (the Hammons Family), Eastern Kentucky (J. P. Fraley and Lee Sexton), Middle Tennessee (Uncle Dave Macon, the McGee Brothers, Thomas Maupin, and Fiddlin' Arthur Smith), and East Tennessee (Charlie Acuff, the Roan Mountain Hilltoppers, G.B. Grayson).

The Old Grey Mare
Appalachian folk music from the Library of Congress' Gordon Collection; performed by Bascom Lamar Lunsford in the Asheville, North Carolina area on October 19, 1925.

The banjo player and fiddler Bascom Lamar Lunsford, a native of the North Carolina mountains, collected much traditional music during his lifetime, also founding the old-time music festival in Asheville, North Carolina. Notable North Carolina traditional banjo players and makers include Frank Proffitt, Frank Proffitt Jr. and Stanley Hicks, who all learned to make and play fretless mountain banjos from a family tradition. These players, among others, learned their art primarily from family and show fewer traces of influence from commercial hillbilly recordings. The Proffitts and Hicks were heirs to a centuries-old folk tradition, and through the middle to late 20th century they performed in a style older than the stringbands often associated with old time music. Their style has been recently emulated by contemporary musician Tim Eriksen.

The Southern states (particularly coastal states such as Virginia and North Carolina) also have one of the oldest traditions of old-time music in the United States.

States of the Deep South such as Alabama, Mississippi, Georgia, and Louisiana also have their own regional old-time music traditions and repertoires, as does the Ozark Mountains region of Arkansas and Missouri, and Ouachita Mountains region of Arkansas (though the distinction of this region from the Ozarks was often missed or ignored by folklorists and archivists). While the music of the Louisiana Cajuns has much in common with other North American old-time traditions it is generally treated as a tradition unto itself and not referred to as a form of old-time music.

=== Native American ===
Several distinctive Native American and First Nations old-time traditions exist, including Métis fiddle and Athabaskan fiddle.

Old-time music has also been adopted by individual Native American musicians including Walker Calhoun (1918–2012) of Big Cove, in the Qualla Boundary (home to the Eastern Band of Cherokee Indians, Matthew Kinman of the Apache Tribe, and Wovoka Herrera of the Northern Paiute people . Calhoun played three-finger-style banjo and sang in the Cherokee language.

=== New England ===
The New England states, being among the first settled by Europeans, have one of the oldest traditions of old-time music. Although the Puritans (the first Europeans to settle in the region), frowned upon instrumental music, dance music flourished in both urban and rural areas beginning in the 17th century. Primary instruments today include the fiddle, piano, and guitar, with the wooden flute sometimes also used. As with Appalachian folk, a number of classical composers have turned to New England folk music for melodic and harmonic ideas, most famously Charles Ives, as well as Aaron Copland, William Schuman, and John Cage, among others. Rhythmically, this style is more diverse than most southern old time, featuring schottisches, hornpipes, and waltzes in addition to reels.

=== Midwest ===
Beginning in the early 19th century, when the Midwestern states were first settled by immigrants from the eastern United States and Europe, the Midwest developed its own regional styles of old-time music. Among these, the Missouri style is of particular interest for its energetic bowing style, while Michigan is one of the few areas in North America with a continuous hammered dulcimer tradition through the twentieth century.

The region of central and southern Illinois has its own distinct style and repertoire of old-time music as well.

In the Upper Midwest, especially Minnesota, old-time music most typically refers to a mixture of Scandinavian styles, especially Norwegian and Swedish.

=== Texas and the West ===
Texas developed a distinctive twin-fiddling tradition that was later popularized by Bob Wills as Western swing music. Fiddle music has also been popular since the 19th century in other Western states such as Oklahoma and Colorado. The National Oldtime Fiddlers' Contest has been held each year in Weiser, Idaho since 1953.

Oklahoma, with its high concentration of Native American inhabitants, has produced some Native American old-time string bands, most notably Big Chief Henry's Indian String Band (consisting of Henry Hall, fiddle; Clarence Hall, guitar; and Harold Hall, banjo and voice), which was recorded by H. C. Speir for the Victor company in 1929.

A California old-time music scene arose from college-city folk music scenes of the 1960s and '70s, from Fresno to Berkeley, including the Sweets Mill music camps and the crossover between square dance, folk dance and instrumental music scenes, documented in oral history interviews collected by musician, teacher and author Evo Bluestein, including the contributions of multi-instrumentalists Kenny Hall, Hank Bradley, and others. The Berkeley old-time scene of the late 1960s is documented in 1971 notes by Rita Weill to the Folkways LP Berkeley Farms. The Berkeley Old Time Fiddler's Convention, she said, was "Conceived in the back of a Volkswagen bus, on the way to a party in Marin County, in 1968, by a group of people who wanted to retain the good music and inter-play they'd witnessed at Southern fiddle-banjo contests, without the competition and corruption extant there. They wished to avoid the effects of regionalism that decreed there was a right way to play a tune and a wrong way, as well. After all, they felt, who could pinpoint one tradition for Berkeley? So it happened with but one rule, 'No fair 'lectric instruments.'"

The Pacific Northwest has a vibrant old-time music community. Extending the north–south corridor from Seattle to Portland and east to Weiser, ID and Boise, gatherings and festivals such as the Portland Old Time Gathering, Festival of American Fiddle Tunes in Port Townsend, WA, an annual campout in Centralia, WA and the National Oldtime Fiddlers' Contest have helped build a growing and multi-generational old time music community.

=== Canada ===
Among the prominent styles of old-time music in Canada are the Scottish-derived tradition of Nova Scotia (particularly Cape Breton Island), the French Canadian music of Quebec and Acadia, the old-time music of Ontario, and the prairie fiddling traditions of the central-western provinces. It is here (primarily in Manitoba and Saskatchewan) that the fiddle tradition of the Métis people is found. The traditional folk music of Newfoundland and Labrador, though similar in some ways to that of the rest of Atlantic Canada, has a distinct style of its own. As such, it is generally considered as its own genre.

== Contemporary musicians ==
The current old-time music scene is alive and well, sparked since the mid-1990s by the combined exposure resulting from several prominent films, more accessible depositories of source material, institutions like the Field Recorders Collective, and the work of touring bands, including the Freight Hoppers, the Wilders, Uncle Earl, Old Crow Medicine Show, Glade City Rounders, Foghorn Stringband, and the Carolina Chocolate Drops. Contemporary old-time music often blends styles with closely related genres, such as bluegrass or other types of folk music.

A new generation of old-time musicians performs as solo acts and band leaders all over the country, including: Brad Leftwich, Dan Levenson, Bruce Molsky, Rafe Stefanini, Bruce Greene, Rhys Jones, Rayna Gellert, Riley Baugus, Leroy Troy, Alice Gerrard, Dirk Powell, Walt Koken, Clifton Hicks, and Martha Scanlan. The Appalachian dulcimer has long been a part of string bands in the Galax, Virginia, area and is seeing new popularity re-emerging as a key instrument for old-time music, thanks to the influence of musicians such as Don Pedi, David Schnaufer, Lois Hornbostel, Wayne Seymour his disciples, Milltown and Stephen Seifert. American hammered dulcimer players like Ken Kolodner, Mark Alan Wade and Rick Thum continue this tradition. Family bands, such as The Martin Family Band, from Maryland, are continuing the traditions of old time music played on fiddle, banjo, lap dulcimer, hammered dulcimer, mandolin, piano, guitar, bass and percussion. The Carolina Chocolate Drops and the solo careers of former members Rhiannon Giddens and Dom Flemons have directly addressed the nearly lost tradition of black stringband music.

Other practitioners of the music included Charlie Acuff of Alcoa, Tennessee, Chester McMillian of Mount Airy, North Carolina, Lee Sexton of Line Fork, Kentucky, Thomas Maupin of Murfreesboro, Tennessee, George Gibson of Knott Co., Kentucky, Michael Defosche in Jackson County, Tennessee, Rob Morrison of Chapel Hill, North Carolina, Jimmy Costa of Talcott, West Virginia, Curtis Hicks of Chattanooga, Tennessee, Clyde Davenport of Monticello, Kentucky, Delmer Holland of Waverly, Tennessee, and Harold Luce of Chelsea, Vermont.

== Festivals ==
Prominent old-time music festivals (some of which also include bluegrass, dance, and other related arts) include the Northern Lights Bluegrass and Old Tyme Music Camp and Festival in Saskatoon, Saskatchewan, Canada (established 2005), Old Fiddler's Convention in Galax, Virginia (established 1935), the West Virginia State Folk Festival in Glenville, West Virginia (established 1950), the National Oldtime Fiddlers' Contest in Weiser, Idaho (established 1953), the Mount Airy Fiddlers Convention in Mount Airy, North Carolina (established 1972), Uncle Dave Macon Days in Murfreesboro, Tennessee, the Vandalia Gathering in Charleston, West Virginia (established 1977), the Appalachian String Band Music Festival in Clifftop, Fayette County, West Virginia (established 1990), Breakin' Up Winter in Lebanon, Tennessee, the Winfield Music Festival is held in Winfield, Kansas and the Smithville Fiddlers' Jamboree and Crafts Festival held in Smithville, Tennessee (established in 1972).

Gallery

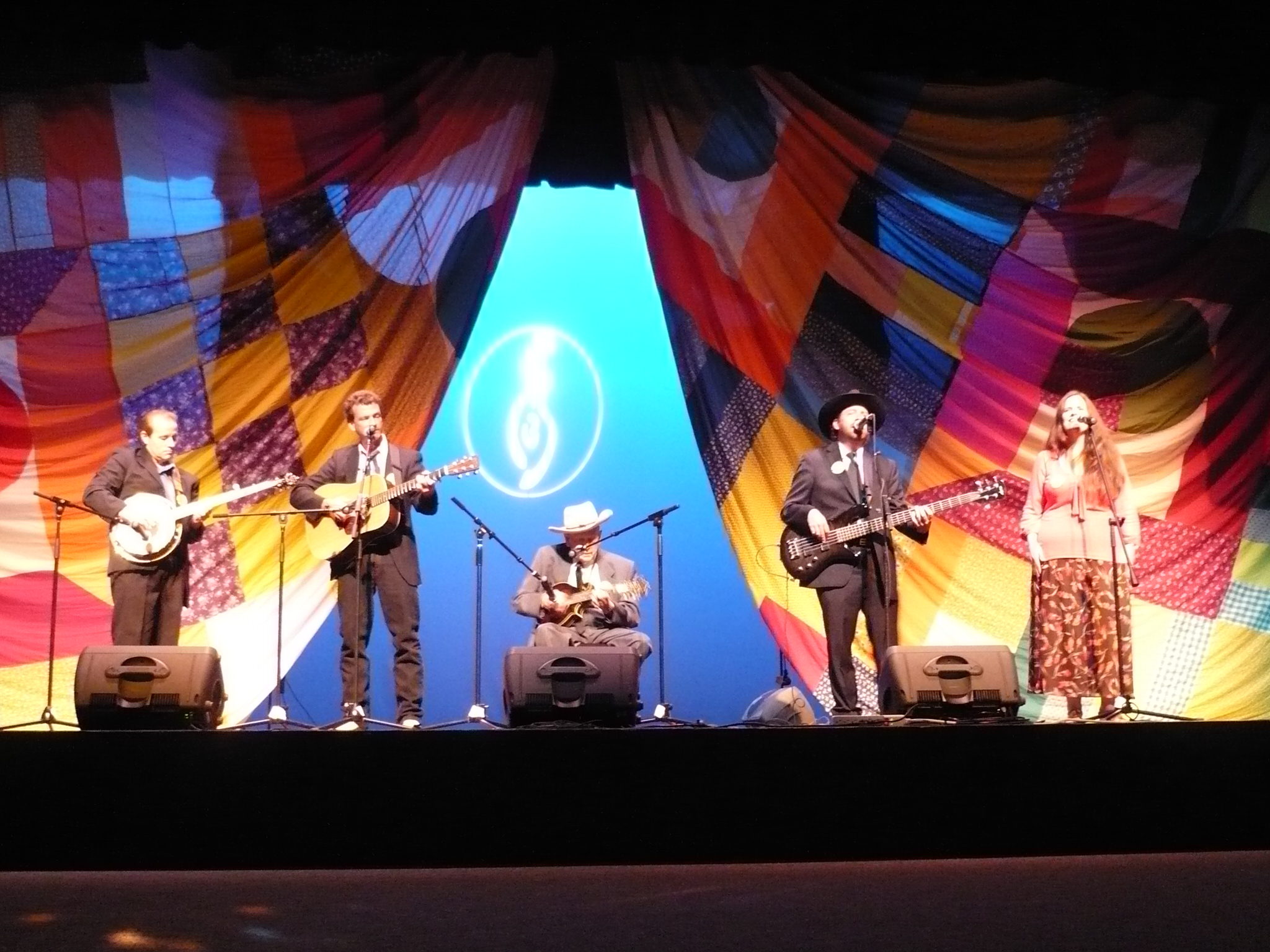

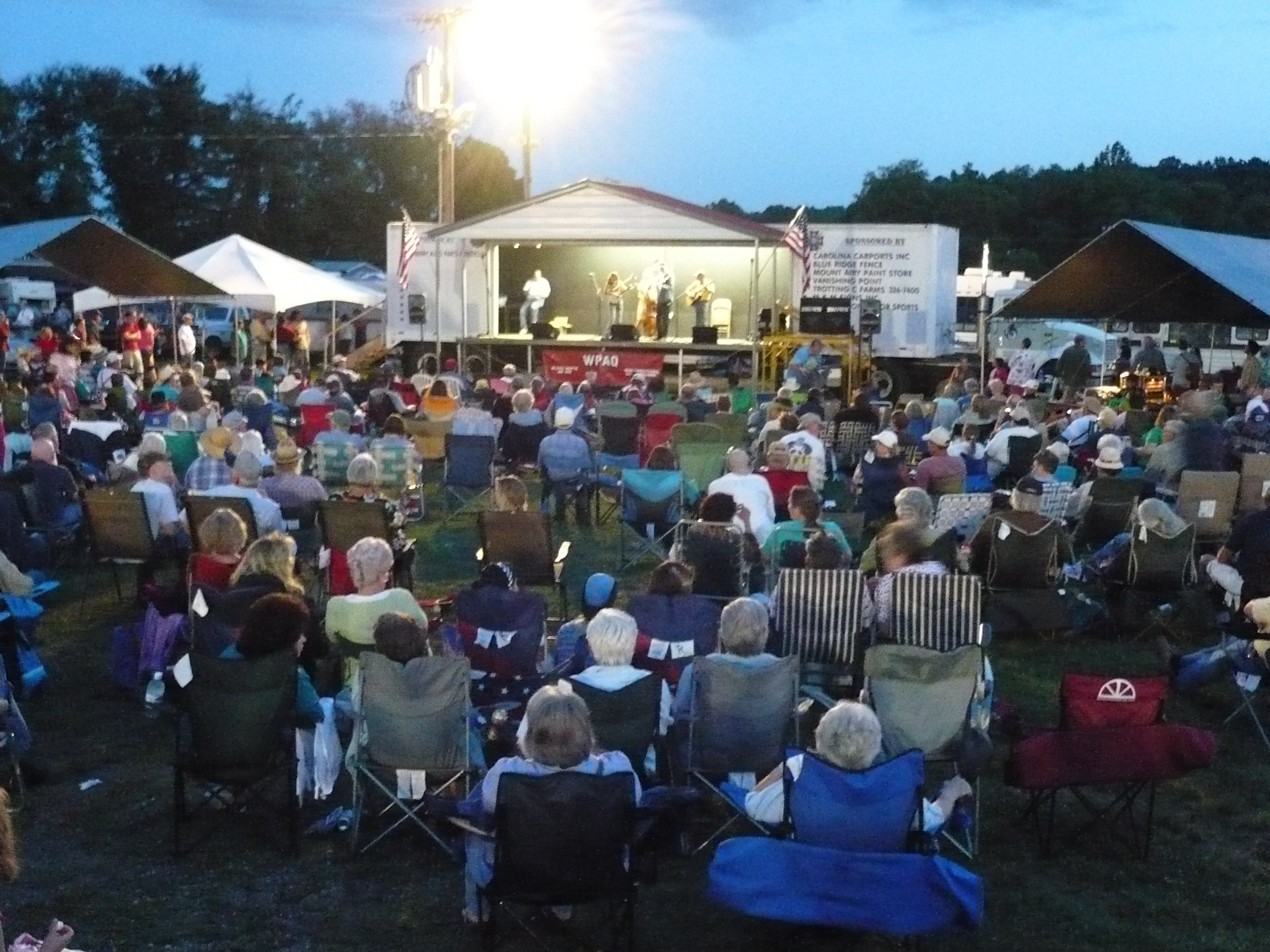

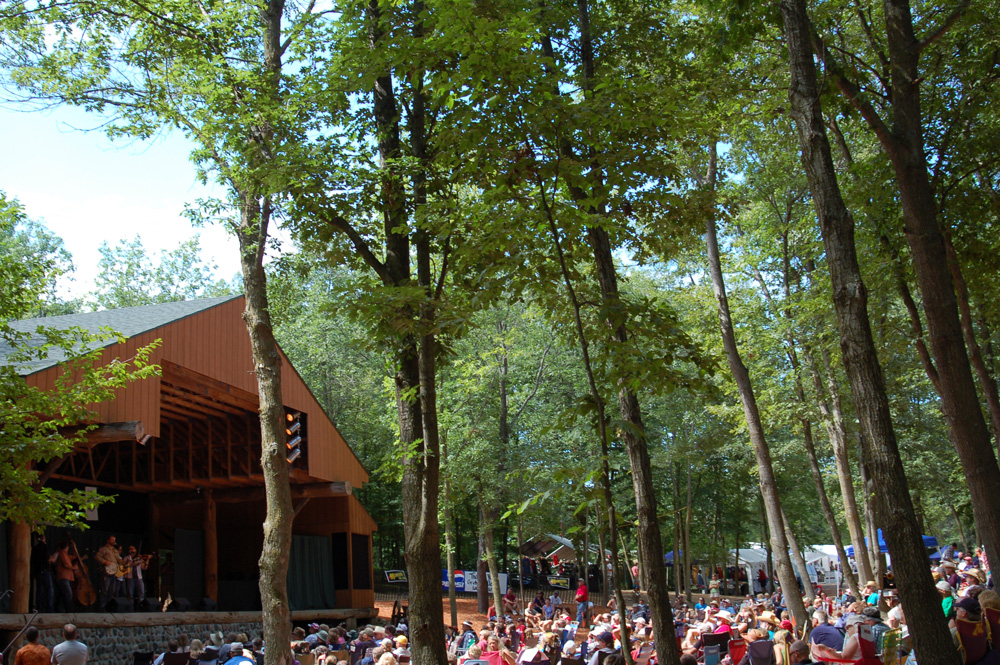

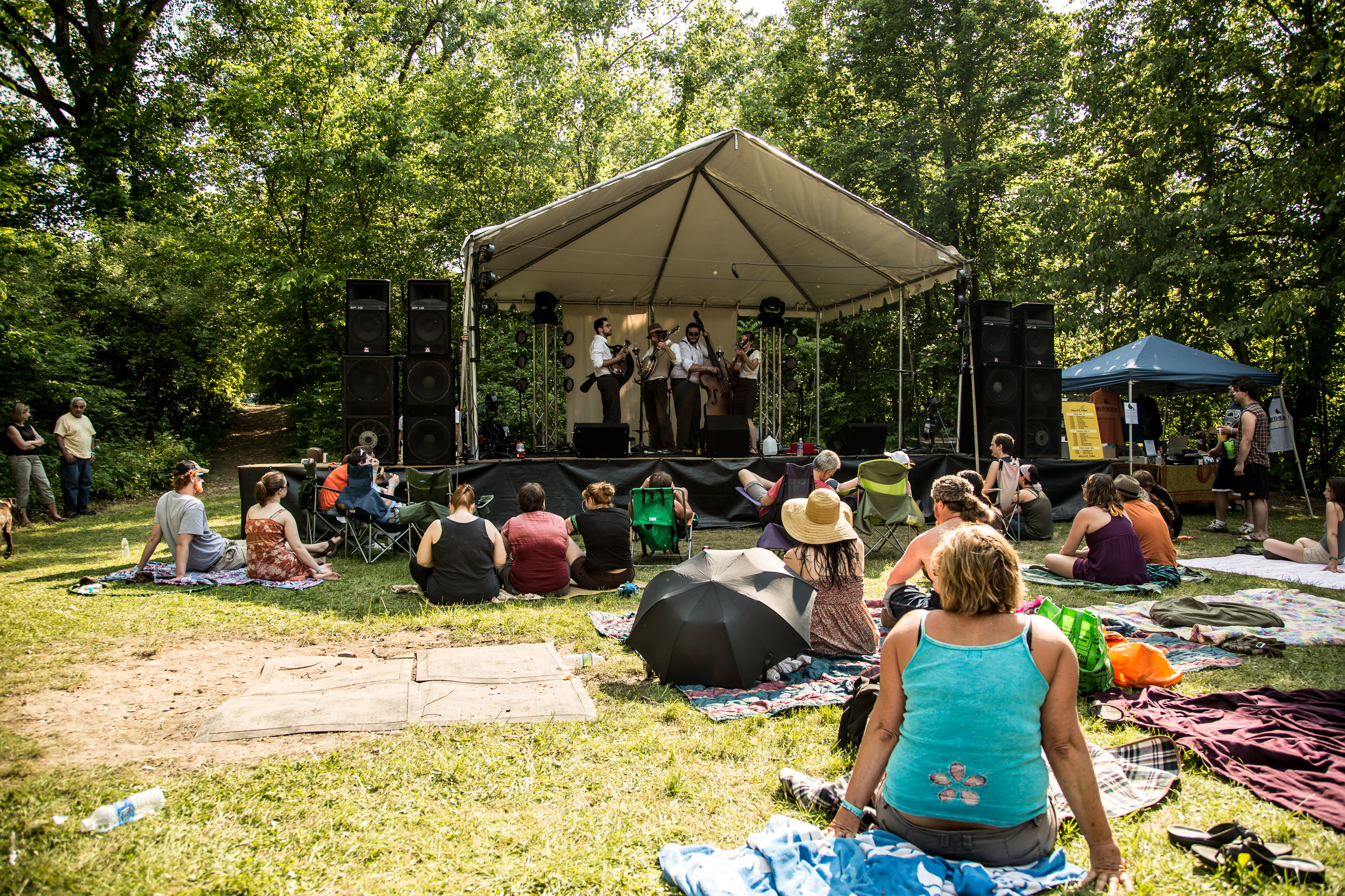

== Dancing ==
Because old-time fiddle-based string band music is often played for dances, it is often characterized as dance music. There are also long-standing traditions of solo listening pieces and fiddle songs, such as those documented in West Virginia by Erynn Marshall in Music in the Air Somewhere: The Shifting Borders of West Virginia's Fiddle and Song Traditions (WVU Press, 2006). In dance music as played by old-time string bands, emphasis is placed on providing a strong beat, and instrumental solos, or breaks, are rarely taken. This contrasts with bluegrass music, which developed in the 1940s as concert music. Bluegrass music developed from old-time music and shares many of the same songs and instruments, but is more oriented toward solo performance than is old-time music.

Many different types of dancing are done to old-time music, such as square dancing, contra dancing, and buck dancing.

While in the British Isles reels and jigs both remain popular, the reel is by far the predominant metric structure preferred by old-time musicians in the United States (though a few hornpipes are also still performed). Canadian musicians, particularly in the Maritime provinces where the Scottish influence is strong, perform both reels and jigs (as well as other types of tunes such as marches and strathspeys).

== Education ==
Players traditionally learn old-time music by ear; even musicians who can read music. A broad selection of written music does exist, although many believe that the style of old-time music cannot be practically notated by written music. This is in part because there are many regional and local variations to old-time tunes, and because some of the most noted players often improvised and wouldn't play a tune exactly the same way every time.

Players usually learn old-time music by attending local jam sessions and by attending festivals scattered around the country. With the spread of broad-band Internet, more and more old-time recordings are available via small publishers. Internet streaming audio ("Web radio"), and small Web sites make the music more accessible.

Although it is one of the oldest and most prominent forms of traditional music in the United States and Canada, old-time music (with a few notable exceptions) is generally not taught in North American primary schools, secondary schools, or universities. Although square dancing is still occasionally taught in elementary schools (generally with recorded, rather than live music), old-time instruments and dances are not included in the educational system, and must be studied outside the school system.

=== Appalachia ===
The Digital Library of Appalachia provides online access to archival and historical materials related to the culture of the southern and central Appalachian region, including audio recording samples. Contents are drawn from special collections of Appalachian College Association member libraries.

Located in Johnson City, Tennessee, East Tennessee State University offers a comprehensive program in bluegrass and old time music studies. The program includes a variety of bluegrass and country music courses, both performance-oriented and academic. Minors in both Bluegrass and in Appalachian Studies are also offered.

There are a variety of programs, mostly in the summer, such as the Augusta Heritage Festival in Elkins, W.V., The Swannanoa Gathering at Warren Wilson College, Blue Ridge Oldtime Music Week at Mars Hill University, the Cowan Creek Mountain Music School, or the Appalachian String Band Music Festival at Clifftop, W.V., that offer week-long immersions in old-time music and dance. These camps are family friendly and allow beginners to enter into the tradition and more advanced players to hone their sound with instruction from some of the best in the music.

In Floyd, Virginia, music lessons, workshops, and immersive "Old Time Music Get Together" long-weekend camps are offered by The Handmade Music School, a non-profit spin-off of local music venue The Floyd Country Store.

=== Outside Appalachia ===
A growing number of folk music schools in the greater United States, usually non-profit and community-based, have taken up the mantle of providing instruction in old-time music: The Old Town School of Folk Music in Chicago, Illinois began in 1957. Pinewoods Camp in Massachusetts, founded in 1935, has included Appalachian music and dance in its summer programs for many years, as well as British Isles music and dance. Numerous other folk-music and dance camps with "themed" weeks, like the Ashokan Center in New York, include specific "Southern" or "Old-time" weeks.

These schools and the subsequent music communities that spring from them offer a positive trend in keeping old-time music alive. Also, universities such as Berklee College of Music, the University of North Carolina at Greensboro, Brown University, UCLA, and Florida State University have "Old Time Ensembles" to teach and keep Old Time music alive. Regular old-time jam circles are also important to spreading and teaching this music. Regular old-time jams occur not only throughout the United States, but in places as far flung as Beijing, China, where the Beijing Pickers jam spawned a bluegrass/Americana group the Randy Abel Stable and the old-time band the Hutong Yellow Weasels. In the UK, Friends of American Old Time Music and Dance was formed in 1995. A year later Sore Fingers Summer School was started.

== Films ==
- Appalachian Journey (1990). Original material recorded and directed by Alan Lomax. A Dibbs Directions Production for Channel Four TV in association with Alan Lomax. Presented by North Carolina Public TV. 1991 videocassette release of an episode from the 1990 television series American Patchwork: Songs and Stories of America.
- Just Around The Bend: Survival and Revival in Southern Banjo Styles – Mike Seeger's Last Documentary (2019). DVD, CDs and 80 page booklet by Alexia Smith, song notes by Bob Carlin.
- My Old Fiddle: A Visit with Tommy Jarrell in the Blue Ridge (1994). Directed by Les Blank. El Cerrito, California: Flower Films. ISBN 0-933621-61-2.
- Songcatcher (dir. Maggie Greenwald, 2000) is a film about a musicologist researching Appalachian folk music in western North Carolina.
- Sprout Wings and Fly (1983). Produced and directed by Les Blank, CeCe Conway, and Alice Gerrard. El Cerrito, California: Flower Films. ISBN 0-933621-01-9
- Cold Mountain (2003), Anthony Minghella (Dir.) Miramax, Mirage Enterprises, Bona Fide Productions.
- The Mountain Minor (2019). Directed by Dale Farmer. Produced by Susan Pepper. Alt452 Productions. ASIN B0863R7B9F

== See also ==
- Banjo
- Bluegrass music
- Folk music
- Music of East Tennessee
- Fiddle
- Country music in Atlanta
