= List of Semester at Sea people =

This is a list of notable people associated with Semester at Sea, including alumni, faculty, administrators, and guest lecturers.

== Notable people ==
=== Alumni ===
==== Arts and media ====
- Fereydoun Ave – Iranian art curator, collector, and cultural figure
- B. J. Averell – television personality and winner of The Amazing Race 9
- Julie Chang – television news anchor and entertainment journalist
- Stephen Gaghan – Academy Award-winning screenwriter and film director
- Joan Lunden – television host and journalist
- Tyler MacNiven – filmmaker, television personality, and entrepreneur
- Neal H. Moritz – film producer
- Cynthia Nixon – actress and political activist
- Aubrey O'Day – singer and television personality
- Iliza Shlesinger – comedian, actress, and television host
- Jasmine Solano – DJ, television host, and music producer

==== Business and entrepreneurship ====
- Adam Braun – entrepreneur and founder of Pencils of Promise
- Tory Burch – fashion designer and businesswoman
- Lexi duPont – entrepreneur and sustainability advocate

==== Politics and public affairs ====
- Kat Cammack – U.S. representative from Florida
- Ariana Austin Makonnen – writer, arts patron, and wife of Prince Joel Makonnen

==== Other notable alumni ====
- Nancy Pearlman – environmental activist and founder of TreePeople
- Kerri Strug – Olympic gymnast and gold medalist

=== Faculty, staff, and guest lecturers ===
==== Arts, media, and humanities ====
- Elaine Barkin – composer, musicologist, and educator
- Ashleigh Brilliant – cartoonist and author
- Arthur C. Clarke – science-fiction writer and futurist
- Thomas B. Coburn – scholar of religion and former president of the University of Puget Sound
- Charles T. Cross – music journalist and author
- Marlin Darrah – filmmaker and cinematographer
- Fil Hearn – architectural historian and author
- Alden Jones – writer and travel memoirist
- James Lull – media scholar and communications professor
- Paul Muldoon – Pulitzer Prize-winning poet
- Michael Pearson (author) – author and television presenter
- Michael H. Prosser – intercultural communication scholar
- Kathryn M. Rudy – art historian and manuscript scholar
- Rajiva Wijesinha – Sri Lankan academic, politician, and author
- Sean Williams – ethnomusicologist and author

==== Science, education, and academia ====
- Kathleen M. Adams – anthropologist and academic administrator
- Andrew Boesenecker – paleontologist and marine mammal researcher
- Robert K. Brigham – historian specializing in the Vietnam War
- Elof Axel Carlson – biologist and historian of science
- Carrie Colla – educator and academic administrator
- Patti Duncan – educator and international programs administrator
- Caleb Everett – linguist and cognitive scientist
- Ann Gargett – educator and global studies administrator
- Daniel Garvey – educator and former president of Presbyterian College
- Kishore G. Kulkarni – economist and academic
- Hunter Lovins – environmentalist and sustainability advocate
- Claude-Hélène Mayer – psychologist and intercultural studies scholar
- George Nelson (astronaut) – NASA astronaut and physicist
- Scott Plous – psychologist and social scientist
- Catherine Pringle – marine scientist and ecologist
- Richard Rapson – historian and university administrator
- Armin Rosencranz – legal scholar and environmental advocate
- Allan A. Schoenherr – ecologist and natural historian
- Kesho Y. Scott – author, educator, and diversity consultant
- Tyler Jo Smith – marine scientist and educator
- Aidan Southall – anthropologist and African studies scholar
- Krista E. Wiegand – political scientist and international relations scholar
- Marc Zimmer – chemist and author

==== Other notable participants ====
- Barry Lubin – clown and circus performer known as "Grandma the Clown"
- Sheriff Ghale – mountaineer and Himalayan guide
- Adam J. Graves – filmmaker and screenwriter
- Judith Ann Mayotte – journalist, author, and humanitarian
- Patrick Mendis – diplomat, author, and academic
- Pete Peterson – businessman, diplomat, and U.S. ambassador to Vietnam
- Tom Joyner – radio host and philanthropist

==== Distinguished guests and speakers ====
- Corazon Aquino – president of the Philippines
- Fidel Castro – leader of Cuba
- King Fahd – king of Saudi Arabia
- Mikhail Gorbachev – leader of the Soviet Union
- Indira Gandhi – prime minister of India
- Nelson Mandela – anti-apartheid revolutionary and president of South Africa
- Mohammed VI of Morocco – king of Morocco
- Sandra Day O'Connor – associate justice of the Supreme Court of the United States
- Prince Moulay Rachid of Morocco – Moroccan prince
- Anwar Sadat – president of Egypt
- Mother Teresa – Catholic nun and Nobel Peace Prize laureate
- Tung Chee-hwa – chief executive of Hong Kong
- Desmond Tutu – Anglican bishop and Nobel Peace Prize laureate
