= Jack (hero) =

English hero and stock character

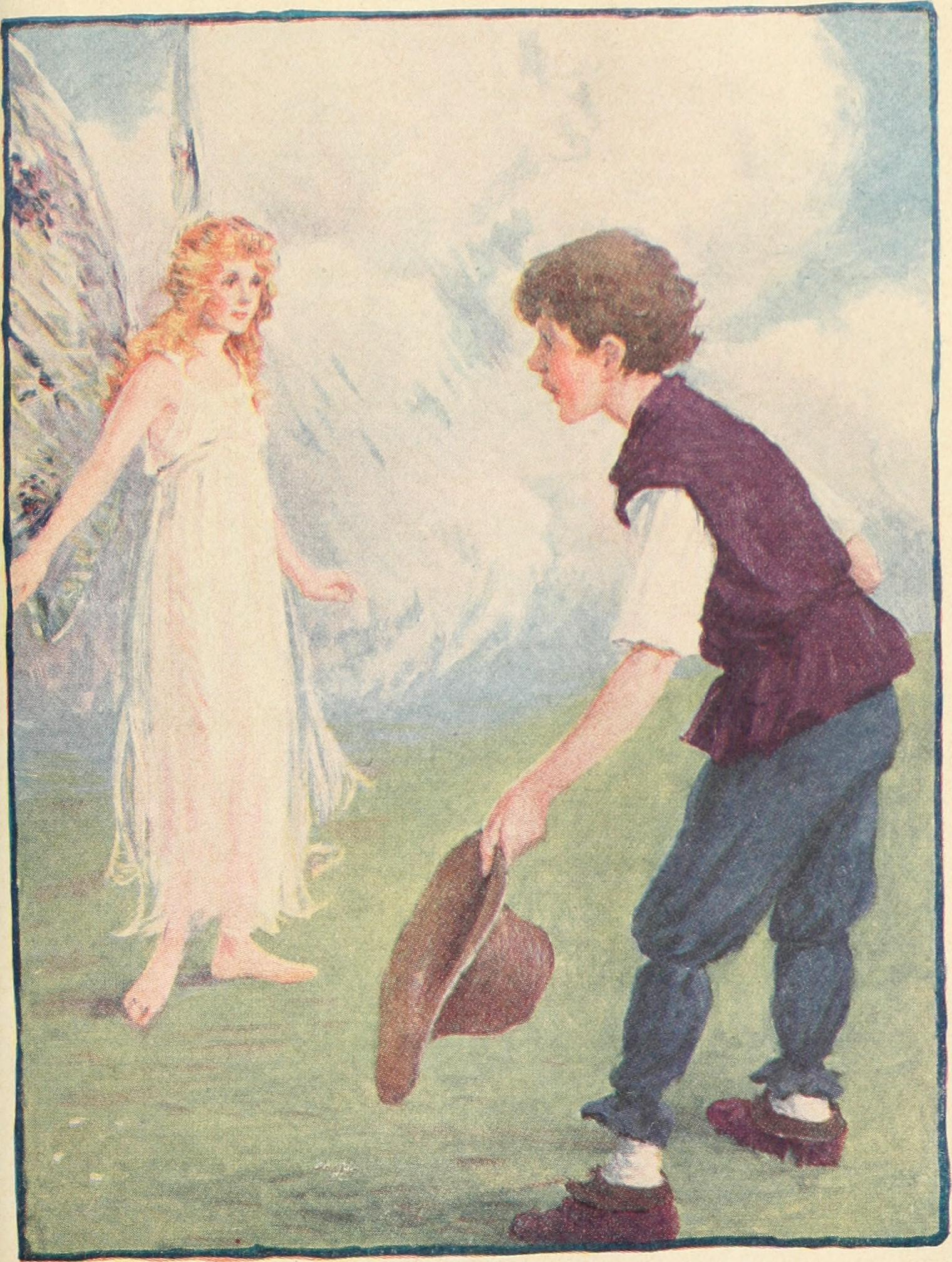
Jack meets a fairy in "Jack and the Beanstalk"

Jack is an English hero and archetypal stock character appearing in multiple legends, fairy tales, and nursery rhymes. Folktales about Jack date back to 15th century England, but have since spread to other countries. Appalachia in particular has a tradition of Jack tales, often told through folk songs.

== History ==
Stephen Winick identifies stories by Geoffrey Chaucer featuring tricky young men named Jankyn or Janekyn as prototypical forms of Jack, both names being diminutive forms of John that later evolved into Jack.

Carl Lindahl writes that stories about Jack go as far back as the 15th century with the English story "Jack and His Step-Dame" about Jack getting revenge on his stepmother who beats him. Jack folktales from the 16th and 17th centuries such as "Jack and the Giants" gave Jack a more heroic role by having him kill giants. By the 18th century, Jack became a common name in folktales as well as nursery rhymes, such as "Jack and Jill", "Little Jack Horner", and "Jack Sprat".

Stories about Jack spread to Scotland and Ireland, appearing as Jock in Robert Chambers's Popular Rhymes of Scotland and as Jake in Gaelic stories. In particular, the Scottish Travelers are prolific tellers of Jack stories in the modern era. Duncan Williamson, a Scottish Traveler and storyteller, described Jack as a "local folk hero" to the Travelers. After fifty years of collecting folk tales, Williamson collected hundreds of stories involving Jack. English colonialism further spread Jack stories to the Caribbean: in the Bahamas, Jack appears as the most popular human character, while in some Jamaican traditions, Jack is used not as a character, but as a figure listening to the story, with stories ending with the phrase "Jack Mantora, me no choose any", meaning "By Jack Mandora [listening at heaven’s gate], don’t blame me for the tale I’ve just told." English migration also spread Jack tales to Newfoundland; many stories in Folktales of Newfoundland (1996) by folklorists Herbert Halpert and J. D. A. Widdowson have Jack as the protagonist.

=== Jack tales in Appalachia ===
Jack tales are present in Appalachian folklore. Appalachian folklorist and singer Jane Gentry wrote several "old Jack, Will, and Tom tales", in which Jack seeks adventure with his older brothers Will and Tom, and Jack succeeds in passing the trials laid out for them. Many of Gentry's stories were published in 1925 by Isabel Gordon Carter. In his 1943 book The Jack Tales, Richard Chase collected many popular Appalachian Jack tales as told by descendants of Council Harmon (1803–1896). These descendants include Maud Gentry Long, daughter of Jane Gentry whose grandfather was Council, Ben Hicks, and Roby Monroe Ward, both grandsons of Council. Council's grandfather Cutliff Harmon (1748–1838) was believed by Chase to have brought the Jack tales to America. In the Appalachian tradition, Jack tales are handed down to each generation in the same way that folk songs are. Herbert Halpert writes that the origin of English folktale in America may be English, Irish, or Scottish stories, or a combination of the three. The Jack Tales were compiled in a period when American intellectuals sought to define a national folk hero.

Ray Hicks was a grandson of Ben Hicks known for telling Jack Tales, and descendants of Hicks have kept the oral tradition alive. The Harmon-Hicks family are also known for their unique repertoire of traditional British folk ballads. Orville Hicks continued the tradition of Jack tales after the passing of Ray, his cousin, who encouraged Orville to continue telling stories to a wider audience. Connie Regan-Blake, a storyteller and friend of Ray, maintains a tribute website to his work. In 2023, Orville expressed concern that the tradition would not be continued after him.

Trevor McKenzie, director of the Center for Appalachian Studies at Appalachian State University, says that Jack tales are based on a time when land was freer and more shared spaces existed, allowing for a wandering spirit that influenced the stories, though this lifestyle is less common in the modern era. McKenzie also allows for the possibility that the stories are changed or adapted to suit the era, just as previous generations did.

== Nature ==
Jack is generally portrayed as a young adult. Unlike moralizing fairy heroes, Jack is often thievish, lazy or foolish, but emerges triumphant through wit and trickery, resembling the trickster or rebel archetypes. In "Jack and his Step-Dame", Jack uses a variety of magical tools to punish his cruel stepmother, including a spell that causes her to fart whenever she looks angrily at Jack. Lindahl writes that "obscene and scatological elements" were part of the tradition of Jack tales.

Martin Lovelace listed several traits of Jack in the Newfoundland tradition, such as being wary of trusting others, having a desire to work and be useful, being adept at using deceitful words, and refusing to flinch. Lovelace attributes these traits to the difficult lives of the working class in Newfoundland, with young children going out to work and being "maltreated by stepmothers or farmer's wives who load them with tasks, starve them, and spy on them." Lovelace compares Jack to historian G.R. Quaife's description of English peasants from 1500 to 1800, both having difficult childhoods that lead them to be short-tempered and prone to violence.

Halpert and Widdowson write that Jack is normally good-natured, though cheeky, and able to stoically take abuse, but once he is able to outwit his tormentors, he becomes vengeful and cruel, punishing those who abused their power over him. Jack acts as a "people's champion", giving an outlet for people who feel wronged by injustice. Halpert and Widdowson describe Jack as an achiever, who is able to succeed against unlikely odds and despite the expectations of other people. In stories where Jack has older brothers, Jack attempts tasks where his brothers failed and succeeds despite being mocked for making the attempt.

Chase distinguishes the Appalachian version of Jack from the English, writing that he has "the easy-going, unpretentious rural American manners that make him so different from his English cousin, the cocksure, dashing young hero of the 'fairy tale.'"

Some of the stories feature Jack's older brothers Will and Tom, such as in Jane Gentry's stories. According to Duncan Williamson, in stories where Jack had brothers, he was always the youngest brother. Lovelace wrote that in the Newfoundland tradition, Jack was typically the youngest of three brothers and his brothers were often treacherous, with the phrase "you can't trust your brother" being told in one story.

The notional "Jack" corresponds with the German hero Hans (or Hänsel), the Russian hero Ivan the Fool, and the Norwegian hero Espen Askeladd.

== Common motifs in Jack tales ==
Halpert and Widdowson gave a list of common elements of Jack tales from Newfoundland they observed, including an unpromising hero, a meeting with a future bride, an encounter with an adversary, assistance from a human or supernatural entity, and accomplishing a task or quest, though they state that some elements are optional. The quest is usually a journey or voyage.

== Legacy ==
Stephen Winick identifies multiple authors who were likely influenced by Jack tales, such as William Morris, George MacDonald, Lewis Carroll, C. S. Lewis, and J. R. R. Tolkien. Morris's novel The Well at the World's End describes a quest for a magical well that grants fortune to those who drink from it, and there are Jack tales in which Jack also quests for a magic well. MacDonald's story, "The Giant's Heart", is related to a Scottish Jack tale recorded by Duncan Williamson. "Jack and the Beanstalk" is considered one of the first portal fantasies, a genre which includes Carroll's Alice stories and Lewis's The Chronicles of Narnia. Aspects of The Lord of the Rings, such as an eagle rescuing the heroes and a ring containing a soul, appear in the Jack tale "Farmer Weatherbeard" which appears in The Langs' Fairy Books. At an early age, Tolkien was influenced by The Langs' Fairy Books, which include multiple Jack tales.

== See also ==
- Jack (name)
- Jack Bros.
- Jack Be Nimble
- Jack Frost
- Jack Horner (comics)
- Jack Sprat
- Jack and His Comrades
- Jack and His Golden Snuff-Box
- Jack and Jill
- Jack in the green
- Jack o' Kent
- Jack-o'-lantern
- Jack of all trades, master of none
- Jack of Fables
- Jack the Ripper
- Spring-heeled Jack
- Stingy Jack
- Jack o' the bowl
