= Connie Regan-Blake =

American storyteller, author and workshop facilitator

Connie Regan-Blake (born January 20, 1947) is an American storyteller, author, and workshop facilitator. Regan-Blake is well-known for her role as part of The Folktellers storytelling duo. She was a founding member of the National Storytelling Network or NSN (formerly the National Association for the Preservation and the Perpetuation of Storytelling or NAPPS). Regan-Blake served as the Artistic Director from 1975 until 1983. She was awarded the Circle of Excellence in 1996 by the National Storytelling Network after being recognized by her peers as a master storyteller. She has appeared onstage as a featured performer or emcee at every National Storytelling Festival since its inception in 1973.

== Biography ==
Regan-Blake first began her work as a storyteller in the early 1970s. She was hired by the Chattanooga Public Library to fill a grant-funded position (as part of the Library Services and Construction Act). With this new position, the library was able to launch the early childhood literacy program, M.O.R.E. (Making Our Reading Enjoyable).

In 1973, Connie Regan-Blake and Barbara Freeman attended the first National Storytelling Festival in Jonesborough, TN. There they met, Ray and Rosa Hicks of Beech Mountain, who became lasting friends and mentors to Regan-Blake. Two years later, Regan-Blake and her cousin, Barbara Freeman left their positions with the Chattanooga Public Library and began touring as The Folktellers storytelling duo.

As The Folktellers, Regan-Blake and Freeman pioneered 'tandem telling,' a type of duet storytelling performance. The duo also created the record label Mama T Artists. Over the next two decades, The Folktellers toured across the country, performing at folk music festivals including the Smithsonian Folklife Festival in Washington D.C..

In 1985, The Folktellers moved to Asheville, NC and began working on a play titled, Mountain Sweet Talk. This two-act, fully staged play starred Regan-Blake and Freeman, incorporating original material and stories of The Folktellers. The show ran for seven seasons (1986-1992) with over 300 performances at the Folk Art Center.

Connie Regan-Blake set out as a solo performer in 1995. She collaborated with The Kandinsky Trio, a chamber music group (consisting of Elizabeth Bachelder on piano, Benedict Goodfriend on violin, and Alan Weinstein on cello) based out of Roanoke College, VA. Regan-Blake and The Kandinsky Trio performed Tales of Appalachia, a piece composed by Mike Reid which combined the arts of storytelling and chamber music.

Connie Regan-Blake performed in Jonesborough, Tennessee at the International Storytelling Center on June 25, 2010.

One of Connie Regan-Blake's original stories is "Hope is Back on Me: A Storyteller's Journey in Uganda." It narrates her experience with Bead for Life, a non-profit group helping Ugandan women out of poverty. Regan-Blake has been a long-time community partner with this organization and made a trip to Uganda in 2007.

Today, Regan-Blake continues her work as a storyteller as well as providing workshops and coaching under the company name, StoryWindow Productions.
