= Wen Bo =

Wen Bo (温波) is a Chinese environmentalist based in Beijing. Born and raised in the coastal city of Dalian in Northeast China, Wen became interested in environmental activism after watching anti-whaling actions by Greenpeace on TV. He later became a journalist with China Environment News and began reporting on China's many environmental problems.

Wen helped found Greenpeace's Beijing office and went on to become the Beijing-based co-director of Pacific Environment's China Program. He has studied, lived and worked in China, South Korea and Japan, and thus has a comparative understanding of environmental problems, activism, and governance in these countries. He's frequently interviewed and profiled by major international news medias such as Time magazine, Radio Free Asia, San Francisco Chronicle, the Financial Times, etc.

== See also ==
- Environment of China
- Greenpeace China
