= Lexi duPont =

American freeskier (born 1989)

- Born: Alexis duPont; February 16, 1989 (age 37); Sun Valley, Idaho
- Education: Community School, Sun Valley, Idaho; University of Colorado Boulder
- Occupation: Professional Freeskier

Alexis duPont (born February 16, 1989) is an American professional big mountain freeskier. She is a Freeskiing World Tour contender and former Junior Olympics competitor, who has been featured in several films such as Warren Miller’s Wintervention and Tracing Skylines. Her mother, freestyle skier Holley duPont, was one of the first women to land a backflip on skis.

== Personal life ==
One of three daughters of Holley and Chris duPont, duPont was born in Sun Valley, Idaho, After graduating from the Community School in 2007, she moved to Beverly, Massachusetts, to attend Endicott College on a sailing scholarship, but after a year decided to enroll in the University of Colorado Boulder where she majored in fine art. In 2010, duPont circumnavigated the globe with Archbishop Desmond Tutu on the MV Explorer through the study abroad program Semester at Sea. Since graduating from the University of Colorado Boulder in 2014, her artwork has earned a permanent display at the American Indian College Fund in Denver.

She is a member of the Du Pont family and a descendant of Éleuthère Irénée du Pont, the French-American industrialist and founder of the DuPont chemical company.

== Career ==
Lexi’s parents put her in her first set of skis at the age of two. Growing up, she pursued ski racing, competing on the Sun Valley ski team and even qualifying for the Junior Olympics two years in a row. During college, she was a member of the University of Colorado Free Style Team, and entered the Freeskiing World Tour, placing in the top 10 overall in 2009 and 2010. After that, she went on to qualify first at Revelstoke, and finished fourth place at the "Red Bull Cold Rush", in 2012.

duPont was signed to Eddie Bauer’s First Ascent team in 2010. In 2013, she was featured in the ski film Tracing Skylines, for which she was nominated for “Best Female Performance” at the Powder Awards, and was also featured in National Geographic’s “Powder Highway Webisodes.”

== Philanthropy ==
In 2007, she participated in a six-week volunteer program at M’Lop Tapang Center for Street Children in Cambodia. Two years later, she climbed Mount Kilimanjaro, to raise funds for children in Tanzania, Africa. She has also volunteered for Beadforlife, and participates in Play Hard Give Back for Higher Ground, helping people with disabilities experience competition and the outdoors without limitations.

== Films ==
- 2010 | Warren Miller’s “Wintervention”
- 2012 | Two Plank Productions’ “Because”
- 2013 | Dubsatch Collectives’ “AK Our Way”
- 2013 | Poor Boyz Productions’ “Tracing Skylines”
- 2013 | National Geographic’s “Powder Highway Road Trip” Webisodes
- 2014 | Poor Boyz Productions’ “Twenty”
- 2014 | Unicorn Picknick’s “Pretty Faces”

== Awards and nominations ==
- 2010 | 3rd Place Freeskiing World Tour, Telluride, Colo.
- 2012 | 1st Place Freeskiing World Tour Revelstoke Qualifier
- 2012 | 4th Place Red Bull Cold Rush
- 2013 | Nomination for “Best Female Performance” at The Powder Awards
