= Fil Hearn =

American architectural and art historian (born 1938)

- Born: Millard Fillmore Hearn, Jr. August 18, 1938 (age 88); Lincoln, Alabama, US
- Title: Professor Emeritus

Academic background
- Education: Indiana University

Academic work
- Discipline: Art and architectural history
- Institutions: University of Pittsburgh

Millard Fillmore Hearn, Jr. (born 18 August 1938) is an American architectural and art historian. He holds the title of Professor Emeritus at the University of Pittsburgh.

He has published extensively on architectural history and theory in the antique, medieval and modern periods. His most recent work is a book Ideas That Shaped Buildings (2003), notable for its accessibility and breadth of history covered.

== Education and academic career ==
Hearn received his BA in history from Auburn University in 1960. He received an MA in history in 1964, and an MA in art history in 1966, both from Indiana University.

In 1969, Hearn completed his doctorate in art history from Indiana University. In 1965 and 1966, he undertook course work for his PhD at the University of California, Berkeley. He completed another year of his doctorate in absentia the following year at the Courtauld Institute of Art in London. His doctoral thesis was titled The Architectural History of Romsey Abbey.

He was a scholar at the Center for Advanced Study in the Visual Arts at the National Gallery of Art in Washington, DC in 1992.

In 2010, Hearn founded the Fil Hearn Study Abroad Award at the University of Pittsburgh to commemorate his dedication to the university's Semester at Sea programme. This award gives undergraduate students of architectural studies the opportunity to study abroad and expand their understanding of their chosen subject. Having studied abroad extensively himself, Hearn encourages his students to learn from different cultures.

Hearn became a professor of art and architecture at the University of Pittsburgh in 1967. Between 1974 and 1978, he was chairman of the History of Art and Architecture Department. In 1981, Hearn became the director of Architectural Studies, a post he held until his retirement in 2006.

== Expertise ==
Hearn's book Ideas That Shaped Buildings won the Silver Award for Architecture in the 2003 ForeWord Magazine Book of the Year Awards. The book was praised for how it brought together analysis of architectural theory and writing about buildings. It was subsequently published in Spanish, Mandarin, and Russian.

=== Inclusion in textbooks ===
Hearn's article "Truth to the medium: Using materials", first published in 1996, is included as a critical text in the reader Introducing Architectural Theory: Debating a Discipline, edited by Korydon Smith and Miguel Guitart, and published by Routledge in 2013. In it, Hearn discusses architectural theories and ideals developed by Ruskin, Viollet-le-Duc, Le Corbusier, and the Brutalism movement. Students are encouraged to compare Hearn's philosophy of architecture with the authors and designers he discusses.

== Selected publications ==
=== Books ===
- Romanesque Sculpture: The Revival of Monumental Stone Sculpture in the Eleventh and Twelfth Centuries, 1981, Cornell University Press and Phaidon.
- Ripon Minster: The Beginning of the Gothic Style in Northern England, 1983, American Philosophical Society.
- Editor, The Architectural Theory of Viollet-le-Duc: Readings and Commentary, 1990, MIT Press.
- Ideas that Shaped Buildings, 2003, MIT Press.

=== Journal articles ===
- "A Note on the Chronology of Romsey Abbey", 1969, Journal of the British Archaeological Association XXXII.
- "The Rectangular Ambulatory in English Mediaeval Architecture", 1971, Journal of the Society of Architectural Historians, volume 30, no. 3.
- "Romsey Abbey: A Progenitor of the English National Traditional in Architecture", 1975, Gesta, volume 14, no. 1.
- "Postscript: On the Original Nave of Ripon Cathedral", 1976, Journal of the British Archaeological Association, 3rd ser. XXXIX.
- "A Japanese Inspiration for Frank Lloyd Wright’s Rigid-Core High-Rise Structures", 1991, Journal of the Society of Architectural Historians, volume 50, no. 1.
- "Conferences Celebrating the Nine Hundredth Anniversary of the Beginning of Durham Cathedral: 'Engineering a Cathedral' and 'Anglo-Norman Durham, 1093–1993'", 1994, Journal of the Society of Architectural Historians, vol. 53, no. 4.
- "Canterbury Cathedral and the Cult of Becket", 1994, The Art Bulletin, volume 76, no. 1.
- "Early Wooden Ribbed Vaults in Medieval Britain", 1997, Journal of the British Archaeological Association.
