= Marc Zimmer =

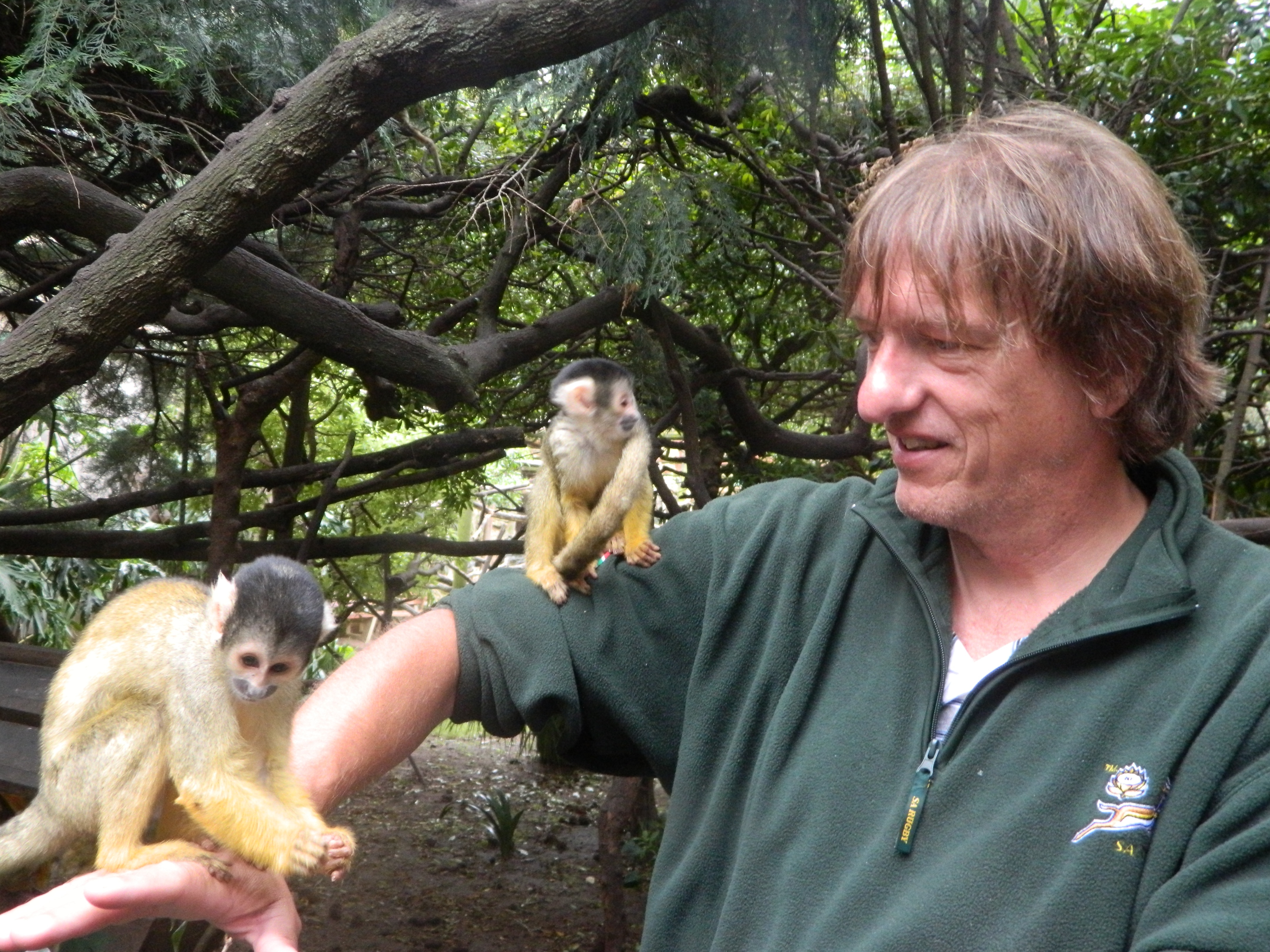
- Born: July 26, 1961 (age 65); Sasolburg, South Africa
- Education: Post-doc, Crabtree group, Yale University (1990); Ph.D., Worcester Polytechnic Institute (1988); M.Sc., University of Witwatersrand (1984); B.Sc. (Hons, Chemistry major), University of Witwatersrand (1983)
- Occupations: Chemist, Educator, Science writer
- Website: Marc Zimmer and GFP

Marc Zimmer (born July 26, 1961) is the Jean Tempel '65 Professor of Chemistry at Connecticut College. He has published seven books, written articles on science and medicine for the Los Angeles Times, USA Today, the Huffington Post, etc. He has been interviewed or quoted in the Economist, Science, Nature etc.

Zimmer curates the GFP website, tweets about GFP (@lightUpScience) and he has published over 60 research papers about cow flatulence, computational chemistry and bioluminescence in fireflies and jellyfish. Zimmer is the initiator and director of the Connecticut College Science Leaders program, a program to increase the number of women and minority students graduating from the college with a degree and research experience in the sciences.

== Boards, awards, etc ==
- Science and the Skeptic on 2023 longlist Russell Freedman Award for Nonfiction for a Better World! An Award of the Society of Children's Book Writers and Illustrators.
- 2020 longlist AAAS/Subaru SB&F Prize for Excellence in Middle Grades Science Books
- Guest on NPR's "Where we Live" show about bioluminescence
- Professor, Semester at Sea, Spring ’12, Summer '13, Fall '16 and Fall '23 voyages
- ACS Western Connecticut Visiting Scientist Award for 2013
- The Princeton Review's 'Best 300 Professors', 2012
- Huffington Post’s one of "13 of the best college professors in the country", 2012
- Carnegie Foundation and Council for Advancement and Support of Education, Connecticut, Professor of the Year, 2007
- John S. Burlew Connecticut Valley Section Award to recognize outstanding contributions to chemistry, 2005
- Program Chair, Inorganic Division, American Chemical Society, 1999-2003

== Bibliography ==
=== Books ===
- “Glowing Genes: A Revolution in Biotechnology.” Prometheus Books, Amherst, New York, 2005. (ISBN 1-59102-253-3).
- “光る遺伝子 オワンクラゲと緑色蛍光タンパク質GFP (単行本).” Maruzen Publishers, Tokyo, 2009. (ISBN 978-4621080948).
- “Illuminating Disease.” Oxford University Press, New York, 2015. (ISBN 978-0199362813)
- "Solutions for a Cleaner, Greener Planet: Environmental Chemistry." Twenty First Century Books, Minneapolis, 2019 (ISBN 978-1541519794).
- “Bioluminescence Nature and Science at Work.” Twenty First Century Books, Minneapolis, 2016 (ISBN 978-1467757843).
- "Lighting Up the Brain: The Science of Optogenetics." Twenty First Century Books, Minneapolis, 2018 (ISBN 978-1512427523).
- "発光する生物の謎 (生命ふしぎ図鑑)." Nishimura Shoten, Matsusaka, 2017 (ISBN 978-4890137725).
- "Solutions for a Cleaner, Greener Planet: Environmental Chemistry." Twenty First Century Books, Minneapolis, 2019 (ISBN 978-1541519794).
- "The State of Science: What the Future Holds and the Scientists Making It Happen." Prometheus Books, 2020 (ISBN 978-1633886391).
- "Science and the Skeptic: Discerning Fact from Fiction." Twenty First Century Books, Minneapolis, 2022 (ISBN 978-1728419459).
- “The Conversation on Biotechnology” edited by Marc Zimmer, Johns Hopkins University Press, Baltimore, 2023 (ISBN 978-1421446141).
- "Diseases Without Borders: Plagues, Pandemics, and Beyond," Lerner Publishing Group, Minneapolis, 2026 (ISBN 979-8765648070).

=== Recent articles ===
- “A Colorful Answer To Pregnancy Puzzle. A Eureka Moment For Chemists: Answer Found In Fruit Fly Poop.” M. Zimmer Hartford Courant, February 6, 2011.
- “Optogenetics: Three not-so-blind (anymore) mice” M. Zimmer Providence Journal, May 7, 2011.
- “Lighting Up Chickens to Prevent Bird Flu Pandemics” Huffington Post, November 28, 2012.
- “Dengue Fever vs. Glowing Mosquitoes” USA Today, February 22, 2013.
- “Luminescent Eel Muscles Fluorescent Protein Revolution into Clinic.” Huffington Post, June 18, 2013.
- “Mending Broken Hearts: Using Embryonic Stem Cells to Repair the Damage Caused by Heart Attacks.” Huffington Post, May 9, 2014.
- "6 tips to help you detect fake science news" The Conversation, March 15, 2021.
- "From CRISPR to glowing proteins to optogenetics – scientists’ most powerful technologies have been borrowed from nature." The Conversation, August 5, 2021.
- "AI makes huge progress predicting how proteins fold – one of biology’s greatest challenges – promising rapid drug development." The Conversation, December 2, 2020.
