= Kathryn M. Rudy =

Kathryn Margaret Rudy FBA FRSE (born 25 February 1969) is a manuscript historian at the University of St Andrews, Scotland. She is best known for her forensic approach to medieval books, and has pioneered the use of the densitometer to measure the grime that original readers deposited in their books. Her research focuses on the medieval reception of manuscripts, how they were manipulated and handled, and how book-making skills were lost with the advent of the printing industry.

Rudy is a professor in the School of Art History at the University of St Andrews and held a Leverhulme Major Research Grant (2019–2022). She is a Fellow of the British Academy, Fellow of the Royal Society of Edinburgh and the recipient of its prestigious Sir Walter Scott medal. She has published five books and regularly contributes to scholarly journals. She performs lectures in the UK and internationally. In 2013 she delivered a TEDx talk about the secret lives of manuscripts. She is an advocate for digital-born humanities scholarship and open access publishing. Kathryn Rudy’s family hails from Erie, Pennsylvania.

== Education ==
Kathryn Rudy completed her undergraduate degree at Cornell University, where she earned a B.A., English and history of art, summa cum laude and with distinction in all subjects (1992). In 2001 Rudy earned her Ph.D. in art history from Columbia University at the City of New York, where she studied with David Freedberg, Simon Schama, and James H. Marrow (at Princeton). She also holds a licentiate in mediaeval studies from St. Michael’s College, Toronto (at the University of Toronto, 2002). She has attended Rare Book School, University of Virginia (1995–2001).

== Career ==
As a graduate student, she was selected as Kress Fellow at the Centre for Advanced Study in the Visual Arts (1999–2001). Upon completing her PhD, she became a fellow at the Pontifical Institute of Mediaeval Studies, University of Toronto (2001–2002). Her first academic post was assistant professor, Semester At Sea/ISE (Institute for Seaboard Education) (2002), during which she sailed from Athens to St Petersburg. She spent a year as Samuel H. Kress Fellow at The Warburg Institute (2005–2006). Thereafter she was appointed curator of illuminated manuscripts at the National Library of The Netherlands (The Hague), a position she held from 2006 until 2009. As Caroline Villers Associate Fellow, Courtauld Institute of Art (September 2009 - August 2010), she developed densitometry as a method for investigating medieval manuscript use history. As a visiting research fellow at the Trinity Long Room Hub at Trinity College Dublin (August 2010 - December 2010), she studied the Fagel Missal. She joined the School of Art History at the University of St Andrews in January 2011 and was named professor in August 2017 and Bishop Wardlaw Professor in 2019.

Rudy has held fellowships from the British Academy, the Bodleian Library, Oxford; the Getty Research Institute, and the Internationales Kolleg für Kulturtechnikforschung und Medienphilosophie (IKKM) at the Bauhaus-Universität Weimar, the Paul Mellon Centre for Studies in British Art (2017–18), the Netherlands Institute for Advanced Study in Amsterdam (2018–19). In 2019-22 held a Leverhulme Major Research Grant, exploring what the pollen and stains found in medieval manuscripts can tell us about their readers and how they were used.

== Honours ==
In 2019 she was elected Fellow of the Royal Society of Edinburgh (FRSE). In January 2020, she was awarded the Royal Society of Edinburgh's Sir Walter Scott medal for her outstanding contribution to art history. In July 2022, she was elected Fellow of the British Academy (FBA), the United Kingdom's national academy for the humanities and social sciences.

== Publications ==
- Rudy, Kathryn M. (2023). Touching Parchment: How Medieval Users Rubbed, Handled, and Kissed Their Manuscripts. Vol. 1: Officials and Their Books. Cambridge: Open Book Publishers. doi:10.11647/obp.0337. ISBN 978-1-80064-961-3. OCLC 1376377187.
- Rudy, Kathryn M. (2019). Image, Knife, and Gluepot : Early Assemblage in Manuscript and Print. Open Book Publishers. Cambridge. ISBN 978-1-78374-518-0. OCLC 1110486874.
- Rudy, Kathryn M. (2017). Rubrics, images and indulgences in late Medieval Netherlandish manuscripts. Leiden, Netherlands. ISBN 978-90-04-32696-5. OCLC 964657107.
- Rudy, Kathryn M. (2016). Piety in pieces : how medieval readers customized their manuscripts. Cambridge. ISBN 978-1-78374-237-0. OCLC 959535017.
- Rudy, Kathryn M. (2015). Postcards on parchment : the social lives of medieval books. New Haven. ISBN 978-0-300-20989-1. OCLC 893896520.
- Rudy, Kathryn M. (2011). Virtual pilgrimages in the convent : imagining Jerusalem in the late Middle Ages. Turnhout: Brepols. ISBN 978-2-503-54103-7. OCLC 753625634.
- Rudy, Kathryn M. (2007). Sint Anna in de Koninklijke Bibliotheek : ter gelegenheid van de vijfenzestigste verjaardag van Anne S. Korteweg = St. Anne in the National Library of the Netherlands : a celebration of the sixty-fifth birthday of Anne S. Korteweg. Anne S. Korteweg, Koninklijke Bibliotheek. Den Haag. ISBN 978-90-76452-87-6. OCLC 213457455.
