= Fereydoun Ave =

Iranian artist, curator and collector

- فریدون آو
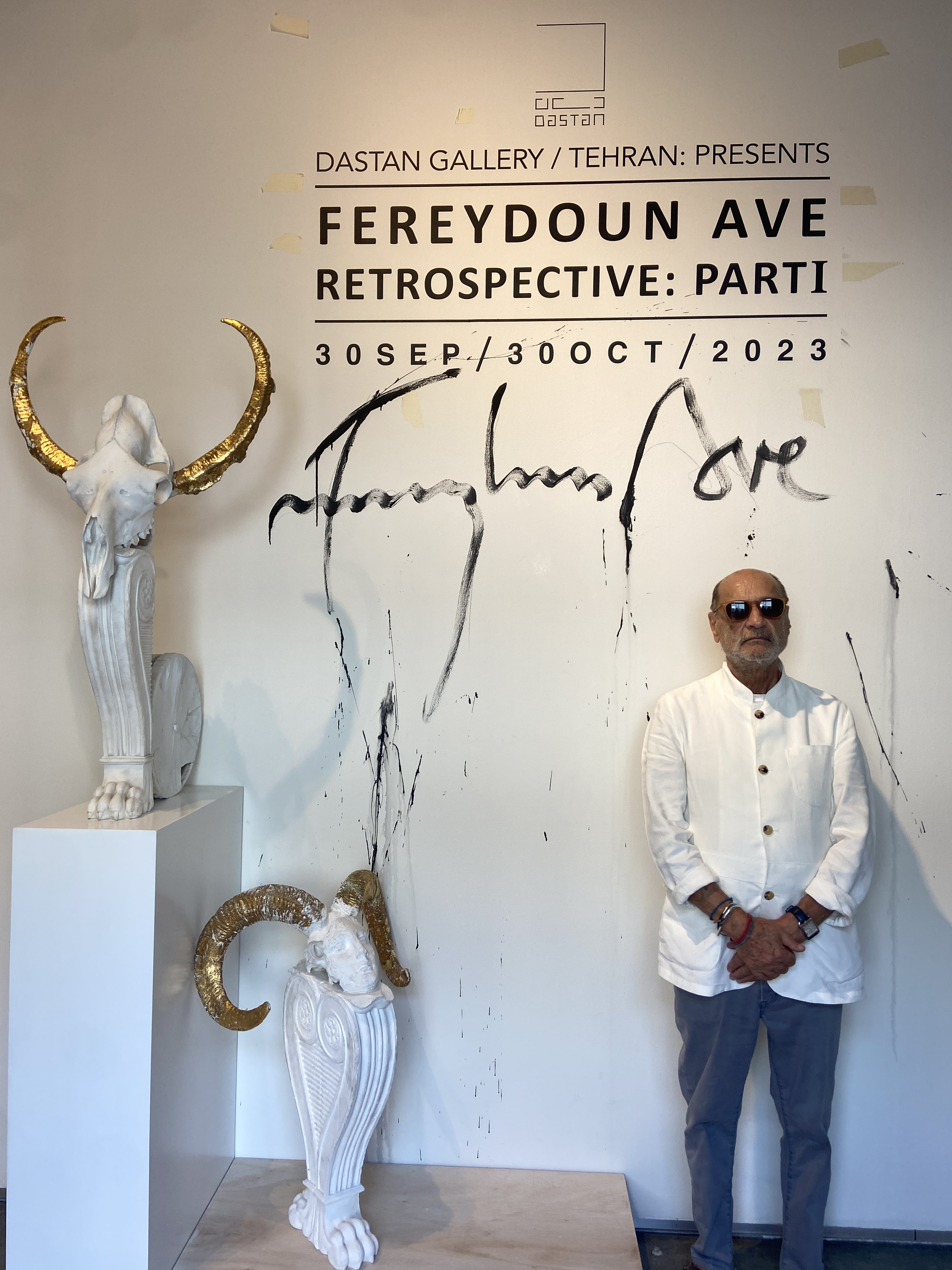
- Ave in 2023
- Born: 1945 (age 80–81); Tehran, Pahlavi Iran, (now Iran)
- Education: Arizona State University, New York University
- Occupations: Visual artist, curator, gallerist, art collector
- Known for: Painting, graphic arts, printmaking, mixed media collage

Fereydoun Ave (born 1945; Persian: فریدون آو) is an Iranian art collector, curator, painter, and sculptor.

== Early life and education ==
Ave was born in Tehran to a Zoroastrian family from Yazd. His father was a merchant from Yazd who traveled between there, Bombay, and London. At the age of eight, he was sent to boarding school at Kings School in Sherborne Park, Gloucester in England. He initially enrolled in Arizona State University for agriculture, before switching to receive his BA degree in applied arts for theatre in 1964. He then studied film at New York University (1969) and attended World Campus Afloat (1964, now Semester at Sea).

Fereydoun has often reflected on his identity as a Zoroastrian minority amidst the backdrop of an increasingly Islamic conservative Iran after the 1979 Iranian Revolution. His nostalgic longing for his idyllic childhood was the basis of his work Endangered Species, which featured three generations of his family layered among texts, fade-ins, and other mixed media. The disconnect he felt between himself as a Zoroastrian and the Islamic Republic led him to return to Persian antiquity for connection, leading to his Rostam and Sohrab Series, from the Persian epic, the Shahnameh.

== Career ==
Ave began his career in theatre, as graphic designer, and sets, costumes, and lighting designer for productions at City Theater of Tehran since its establishment in 1971. At the time, he was one of the only people in Iran that had a bachelors in theater-arts, which enabled him to get brochures, makeup, lighting, costumes and set design. His first teacher and art director there was Douglas James Johnson. There he worked together with many who became later collaborators Arby Ovanessian, Bijan Saffari and Assurbanipal Babilla, who together created a central force for the development of Iranian Theater.

During this period in early 1970's Iran, Fereydoun was very involved in Tehran’s social scene, and hosted an open house attended by Keyvan Khosorvani, Farideh Gohari, Tony Shafrazi and Gans Myer. It was the seeds of this cultural gathering that led Fereydoun to accept his first role as art director for the Zand Gallery in 1977. Located in the A.S.P towers in Tehran, the Zand gallery became Tehran’s first true international gallery. He also had a large hand in creating the Behshahr Industries art collection. Between 1974 and 1979 he was acting artistic director of the Zand Gallery in Tehran. After the Revolution, in the 1980s, he created his own alternate space, 13 Vanak Street, which became an influential communal art space for emerging Iranian artists. He also worked at the Hayden-Zand Gallery in Washington, D.C.

Much of Fereydoun's work draws from feeling a disconnect between Islamic Iran and the Zoroastrian Iran of old. Much of his work draws from the Iran epic The Shahnameh, such as his Rostam series, which was driven by a self-proclaimed critique of "male fragility" inside the Islamic Republic. The connection to the Shahnameh was the theme for a joint gallery between himself and Iranian photographer Shirin Neshat.

He was influenced by his friend and mentor Cy Twombly with whom he had a 40-year relationship, sharing a studio at several points in his life.

As an artist, some of Ave's works are housed in museums worldwide, including the British Museum, the Tehran Museum of Contemporary Art, the Metropolitan Museum of Art in New York, Los Angeles County Museum of Art, Victoria & Albert Museum, and the Centre Pompidou in Paris. Ave is also an established curator and his private collection includes works of Cy Twombly, Charles Hossein Zenderoudi, Abbas Kiarostami and Andy Warhol.

== Bibliography ==
- Fereydoun Was Not an Angel: A Conversation with Fereydoun Ave, 2018, Dastan publications
- Golestaneh, Ali (2012). Tehran Art: A Popular Revolution. Contemporary Art Publications. ISBN 9789948164746.
- Don Rubin, Ravi Chaturvedi (1994). The World Encyclopedia of Contemporary Theatre; 1994
- Alternative Iran; Contemporary Art and Critical Spatial Practice; Pamela Karimi, 2022, Stanford University Press, ISBN 9781503631816
- Bibliography of Art and Architecture in the Islamic World; 2012, Brill, ISBN 9789047412076
- Urban Culture in Tehran, Seyed Hossein Iradj Moeini,2017, Springer International Publishing, ISBN 9783319655000
