= Kathleen M. Adams =

Socio-cultural anthropologist

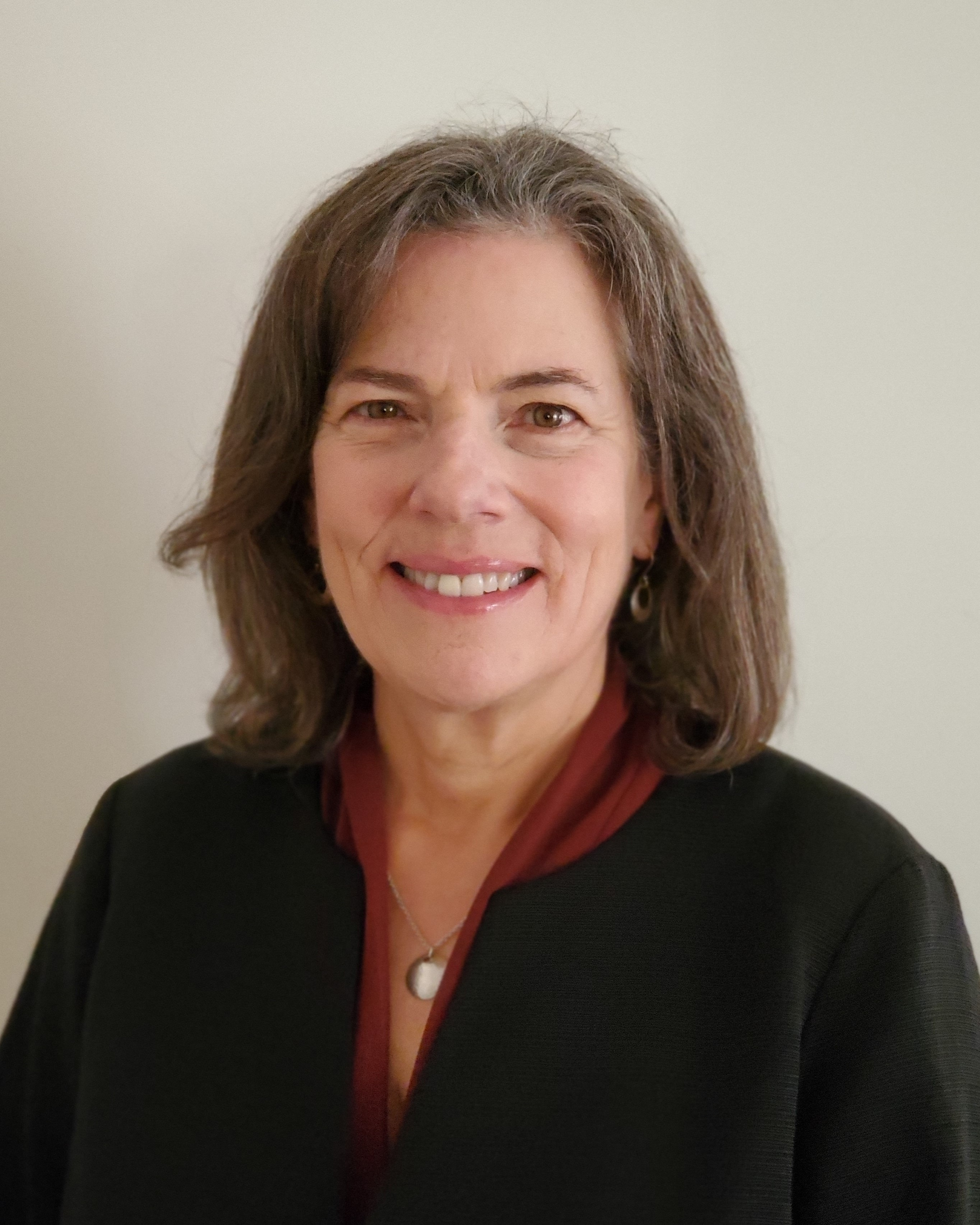
Kathleen M. Adams in 2023

Kathleen M. Adams is a cultural anthropologist, Professorial Research Associate at SOAS, University of London, and professor emerita at Loyola University Chicago. Her scholarship addresses cultural changes in island Southeast Asia, especially the Toraja people of Indonesia, critical tourism studies, heritage studies, arts, and museums.

== Education ==
Adams received her B.A. from the University of California, Santa Cruz and a Ph.D. in sociocultural anthropology at the University of Washington. For advanced Indonesian studies, she attended Cornell University and Satya Wacana University in Indonesia. Before assuming a faculty position at Loyola University Chicago, she was an Assistant Professor of Anthropology at Beloit College, where she held the Mouat Family Endowed Chair. She also served as an Adjunct Curator at the Field Museum of Natural History from 1997 to 2022.

== Publications ==
Adams has authored and edited multiple books, including three award-winners: Art as Politics: Re-crafting Identities, Tourism and Power in Tana Toraja, Indonesia (2006, winner of 2008 Alpha Sigma Nu Book Award), The Ethnography of Tourism: Edward Bruner and Beyond (2019, coedited with Leite and Casteneda, winner of the American Anthropological Association's 2020 ATIG Bruner Book Award)), and Intersections of Tourism, Migration, and Exile (2023, coedited with Bloch, winner of the American Anth. Assoc.'s Council on Heritage and the Anth. of Tourism's 2023-2024 Bruner Book Prize.). Her articles have been published in a wide range of venues, including the leading journals in her field.

== Awards and honors ==
Adams is currently a Fulbright Specialist Awardee (2024-2026). In 2026, she received the Roy Wolfe Award for outstanding contributions to the field of recreation, tourism, and sports geography by the American Association of Geographers Recreation, Tourism and Sports Specialty Group. Adams' research has been funded by foundations such as the Fulbright, the American Philosophical Society, and the Henry R. Luce Foundation. She received Loyola University's Sujack Master Researcher Award (2016, 2020), Loyola University Chicago's 2007 Sujack Award for Teaching Excellence, and recognition by Princeton Review as one of the "300 best professors" in the US and Canada in 2012. In 2023, the American Anthropological Association's Council on Heritage and Tourism established an annual Kathleen M. Adams Student Paper Award. In 2024, she was inducted into Redwood High School's Avenue of Giants.

Adams was a critical tourism studies specialist and lecturer at Gadjah Mada University (2024) in Indonesia, a Visiting Fellow at The Center for Tourism Research at Wakayama University (2020–2023), Visiting Professor at Ateneo de Manila University (2016), Al-Farabi Kazakh National University (2016), and Loyola University Chicago's John Felice Rome Center (2008–2009). She was an Isaac Manasseh Meyer Senior Fellow at the National University of Singapore's Centre for Advanced Study (1999). She taught on University of Virginia Semester at Sea voyages.

== Books ==
- 2023 Intersection of Tourism, Migration, and Exile. (Co-edited with Natalia Bloch). Routledge.
- 2022 Seni Sebagai Politik. (Translated by Anwar Jimpe Rachman). Penerbit Ininnawa.
- 2019 Indonesia: History, Heritage, Culture Key Issues in Asian Studies Series. Association for Asian Studies Press.
- 2019 The Ethnography of Tourism: Edward Bruner and Beyond (Co-edited with N. Leite and Q. Casteneda). Rowman and Littlefield.
- 2011 Everyday Life in Southeast Asia. (Co-edited with Kathleen Gillogly). Indiana University Press.
- 2006 Art as Politics: Re-crafting Identities, Tourism, and Power in Tana Toraja, Indonesia. University of Hawaii Press.
- 2000 Home and Hegemony: Domestic Service and Identity Politics in South and Southeast Asia. (Co-edited with Sara Dickey). University of Michigan Press.

== Selected key articles ==
- 2024 Tourism Ethnography and Tourism Geographies. Tourism Geographies.
- 2020 (Post-) Pandemic Tourism Resiliency: Southeast Asian Lives and Livelihoods in Limbo. Tourism Geographies.
- 2020 What Western Tourism Concepts Obscure: Intersections of Tourism and Migration in Indonesia. Tourism Geographies.
- 2018 Revisiting "Wonderful Indonesia": Tourism, Economy, and Society. Routledge Handbook of Contemporary Indonesia. Routledge.
- 2018 Leisure in the Land of the Walking Dead: Western Mortuary Tourism, the Internet, and Zombie Pop Culture in Toraja, Indonesia. In Leisure and Death: An Anthropological Tour of Risk, Death, and Dying (Kaul & Skinner, eds). Univ. of Colorado Press. pp. 97–121.
- 2016 Tourism and Ethnicity in Insular Southeast Asia: Eating, Praying, Loving and Beyond. Asian Journal of Tourism Research 1(1): 1-28.
- 2015 Families, Funerals and Facebook: Reimag(in)ing and Curating Toraja Kin in Translocal Times. TRaNS: Trans– Regional and –National Studies of Southeast Asia. 3(2):239-266.
- 2010 “Courting and Consorting with the Global: The Local Politics of an Emerging World Heritage Site in Sulawesi, Indonesia.” In Heritage Tourism in Southeast Asia (King, Parnwell & Hitchcock, eds.). NIAS.
- 2008 The Janus-Faced Character of Tourism in Cuba: Ideological Continuity and Change. Annals of Tourism Research, 35(1):27-46. Coauthored with P. Sanchez.
- 2005 Public Interest Anthropology in Heritage Sites: Writing Culture and Righting Wrongs. International Journal of Heritage Studies, 11(5):433-439.
- 2004 The Genesis of Touristic Imagery: Politics and Poetics in the Creation of a Remote Indonesian Island Destination. Tourist Studies, 4(2):115-135.
- 2003 “Global Cities, Terror and Tourism: The Ambivalent Allure of the Urban Jungle.” In Postcolonial Urbanism: Southeast Asian Cities and Global Processes (Bishop, Phillips & Yeo (eds.). London: Routledge. pp. 37–59.
- 1998 Ethnic Tourism and the Renegotiation of Tradition in Tana Toraja, Sulawesi (Indonesia). Ethnology, 309–320.
- 1998 More than an Ethnic Marker: Toraja Art as Identity Negotiator. American Ethnologist 25(3):327-51.
- 1984 "Travel Agents as Brokers in Ethnicity." Annals of Tourism Research 11(3):469-485.

== Other sources ==
- "Channeling Tourism Towards Enhancing the Quality of Life for Local Communities". AMINEX Fulbright Indonesia. Retrieved 28 April 2026.
- "Fulbright-Winning Professor takes Holistic Approach to Critical Tourism in Indonesia". Loyola Today. 26 September 2024.
- "A Short Interview with Kathleen Adams". Education About Asia. Spring 2019..
- "Kathleen Adams, Antropolog AS yang Jatuh Hati pada Indonesia". Voice of America. 16 July 2013.
- "Kathleen Adams over 'Langzame Museologie'". 24 September 2019.
