= Armin Rosencranz =

Armin Rosencranz (born 1937) is the founder of Jindal Global School of Environment and Sustainability, at OP Jindal Global University, in Sonipat, India. In 1987, he founded the international environmental NGO, Pacific Environment, which he led until 1996. He has received five Fulbright grants – two to India, and one each to Australia, Indonesia and the Philippines. Rosencranz has a long-standing association with Stanford University, where he served as the President of the Student Body, a Faculty Resident in an undergraduate dorm, and a Trustee.

== Education and early career ==
Rosencranz is a lawyer and a political scientist. He earned an Arts Bachelor (A.B.) from Princeton University and an LL.B., M.A and Ph.D. in political science from Stanford University. Earlier in his career, he was a staff member of President Johnson’s secret task force on government organization. He also conducted a set of hearings on urban problems for the then-Senator, Robert Kennedy.

== Teaching ==
At Stanford, Rosencranz taught courses on environmental and natural resources policy and law from 1994-2012. His courses were cross listed in ten departments, including history, political science, human biology and earth systems. He received three student-nominated awards for teaching excellence, including “Teacher of the Year”. He has taught five times on Semester at Sea.

He has also taught climate, energy, and global environmental law courses at Boalt Hall School of Law (UC Berkeley), Golden Gate Law School and Georgetown Law School. He has been a visiting professor at several universities, including Ashoka Trust for Research in Ecology and Environment, Bangalore; Graduate School of Public Policy and School of Law, University of Maryland; Vermont Law School; and University of Bologna.

Since 2014, he has taught climate change and environmental law courses at Jindal Global Law School, Sonipat, India, with shorter teaching assignments at the National University for Juridical Sciences, Kolkata; National Law School of India University, Bangalore; and Griffiths Law School, Brisbane, Australia.

== Publications ==
He has co-authored Environmental Law and Policy, a key text in its field. Published by Oxford India, the book is now going into its third edition. His recent works include:

1. Climate Change Science and Policy (Island Press, 2010), with Stephen H. Schneider, Michael Mastrandrea and Kristin Kuntz-Duriseti.
2. Climate Change Policy (Island Press, 2002), with Stephen H. Schneider and John Niles.
3. 'Waste to Energy Projects: Comparing Approaches,' (2015) 45(3-4) Environmental Policy and Law, with Harsh Vardhan Bhati.
4. ‘Determining Environmental Compensation: The Art of Living Case,’ (2019) 12(1) National University of Juridical Sciences Law Review, with Raghuveer Nath.
5. ‘The Deteriorating State of the Arctic and the Impact of the Shipping Industry,’ (2019) U.S. Environmental Law Reporter, with Harsha Pisupati.
6. ‘Internationally Cooperative Solutions to the Deteriorating Situation in Antarctica,’ (2019) Gujarat National Law University, Law and Society Journal, with D. K. Kaul and Aditya Vora.
7. ‘Comparing the US and India on Climate Change: How the Tables Turned,’ in The Implementation of the Paris Agreement on Climate Change (Routledge, 2019), with Rajnish Wadehra.

== Personal life ==
Rosencranz was married to Robbie Engelmann from 1976 until her death in 2011. He has two sons and three grandchildren.
