= Blue Dream Star =

Liberia-registered passenger ship

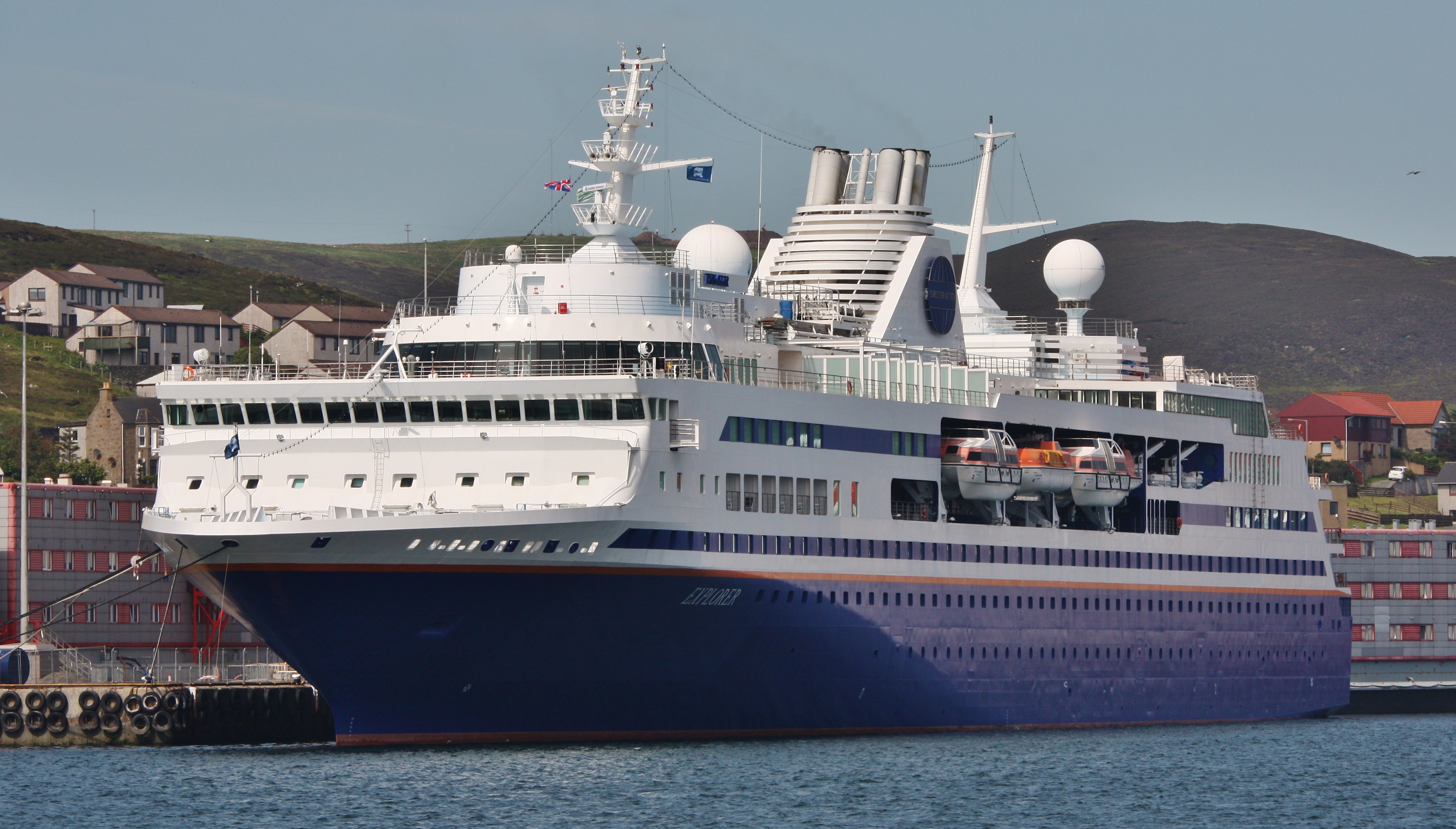
- Blue Dream Star as Explorer in Lerwick

History
- Name: 2001–2004: Olympia Explorer; 2004–2015: Explorer; 2015–2016: Celestyal Odyssey; 2016–2020: Glory Sea; 2020–present: Blue Dream Star
- Operator: 2001-2004: Royal Olympic Cruises; 2004–2015: V-Ships; 2015–2016: Celestyal Cruises; 2016–2020: Diamond Cruises International; 2020–present: Blue Dream Cruises China
- Port of registry: 2001–2004 Greece; 2004–2015 Bahamas; 2015–2016 Malta; 2016–2020 Bahamas; 2020–present Liberia
- Builder: Blohm+Voss, Hamburg, Germany
- Yard number: 962
- Launched: 19 May 2000
- Completed: 2001
- Maiden voyage: 2001
- In service: 2001
- Identification: IMO number: 9183518; MMSI number: 636020005; Call sign: D5XF2
- Status: Active

General characteristics
- Type: Cruise ship
- Tonnage: 24,318 GT
- Length: 180 m (590 ft 7 in)
- Beam: 25 m (82 ft 0 in) or 26 m (84 ft)
- Draft: 7.3 m (24 ft)
- Decks: 7 total, 6 passenger
- Propulsion: 4 × Wärtsilä 9L46C, 45,360 bhp (33,820 kW) (11,340 bhp, 8,460 kW per engine)
- Speed: 30 knots (56 km/h; 35 mph)
- Capacity: 836 passengers

Blue Dream Star was a Liberia-registered passenger ship. The ship was built in Germany in 2001 by Blohm+Voss and originally named Olympia Explorer. The ship was later renamed Explorer when it began sailing for the Semester at Sea program in 2004 and remained with them until 2015.

In May 2015, the ship was renamed Celestyal Odyssey and began sailing for Celestyal Cruises, under the flag of Malta.

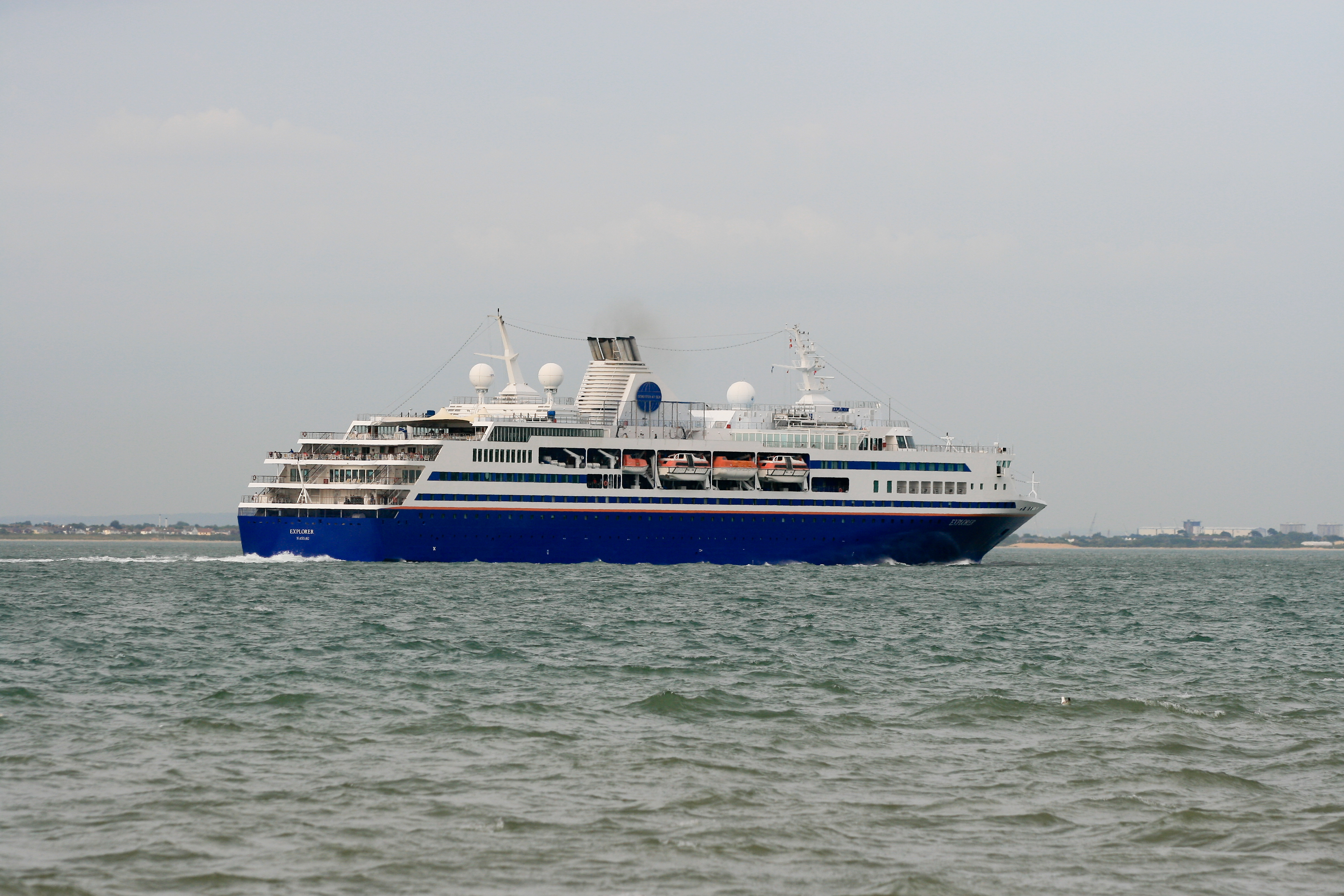
Explorer departing from Southampton on 17 June 2013

In September 2015 it was announced that Celestyal Cruises had terminated their three-year contract of owning Celestyal Odyssey. The ship left the fleet in late October 2015.

The ship was replaced with MS Gemini, renamed Celestyal Nefeli. In March 2016 it was reported that Celestyal Odyssey had been sold to be used as the first ship of Diamond Cruises International, a China-based cruise line, and due to enter service in April as Glory of the Seas. The ship entered service in July 2016, named Glory Sea, with cruises from several Chinese ports, with destinations in eastern Asia. In March 2019 the ship was arrested following claims for unpaid crew wages and sold at auction in 2020 to Blue Dream International Cruise.

When group travel restrictions in China were relaxed after the COVID-19 pandemic in August 2023, Blue Dream Cruises immediately began their cruise programme with Blue Dream Star, sailing from Shanghai. In 2026 it was sold to Turkey.
