= Southern Highland Craft Guild =

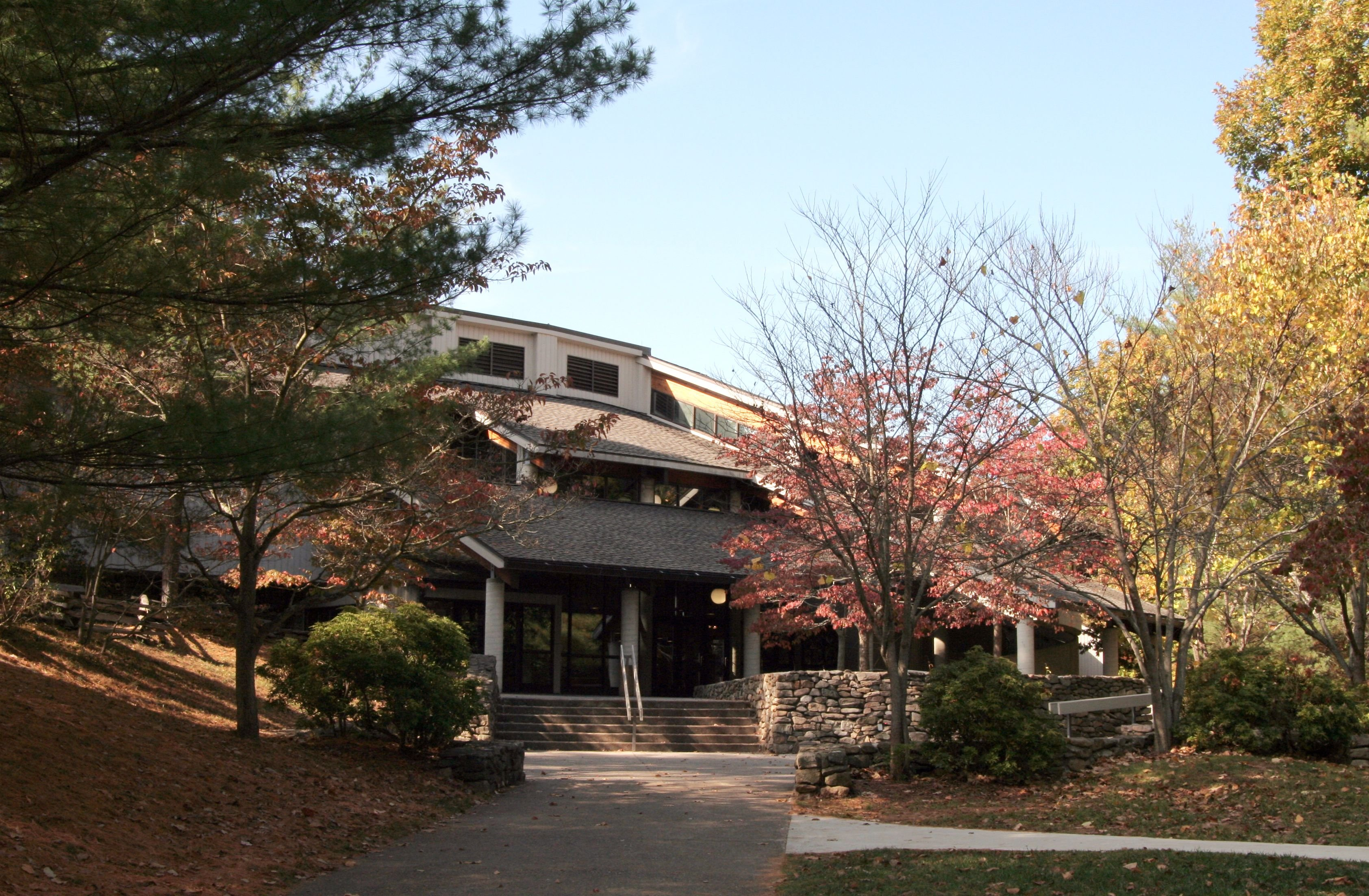
Folk Art Center is the headquarters for Southern Highland Craft Guild

Southern Highland Craft Guild is a guild craft organization that has partnered with the National Park Service for over seventy years. The Guild represents over 800 craftspeople in 293 counties of 9 southeastern states. It operates four retail craft shops and two annual craft expositions which represent the Guild members' work. These expositions occur in July and October and have taken place in the Appalachian mountain region since 1948.

== Headquarters ==
The Southern Highland Craft Guild is headquartered at the Folk Art Center at milepost 382 of the Blue Ridge Parkway in Asheville, North Carolina. The Folk Art Center also houses the Guild's century-old Allanstand Craft Shop, three galleries of exhibitions, a research library, and a large auditorium. The Guild's crafts are seen by about a quarter of a million visitors each year.

== History ==
The Guild was the brainchild of Olive Dame Campbell, founder of the John C. Campbell Folk School. She and other founding members met through the Southern Mountain Workers Conference which was held in Knoxville beginning in 1900. At the Southern Mountain Workers Conference of 1926 Olive Campbell suggested forming an actual official crafts organization. This was followed by planning meetings in 1928 and 1929 at which founding members decided the goals and by-laws of the Guild at the Spinning Wheel in Asheville, North Carolina.

They then came up with the name of Southern Mountain Handicraft Guild. The organization was chartered in 1930 as the Southern Mountain Handicraft Guild and in 1933 changed its name to the Southern Highland Handicraft Guild. The name changed again and the word "Handicraft" was changed to just "Craft".

In the 1940s TVA work led to the formation of the Southern Highlanders, a similarly named craft marketing organization which was government sponsored and had shops at the Norris Dam in Tennessee and the Rockefeller Center in New York City. Because of the broad over-lap in region and purpose, Southern Highlanders merged with the Craft Guild in 1951.

== Collections ==
Many of the pieces date from the 19th century and were collected by Frances Louisa Goodrich. Goodrich was 74 when the Guild was actually founded and so while she was involved, her main contribution was in deeding her Allanstand Cottage Industries sales outlets to the new Guild.

== Membership ==
Membership in the organization is strictly of those that represent John C. Campbell's definition of Appalachia. The active members come from a nine-state region that includes counties within the Appalachian mountain area of Kentucky, Tennessee, Virginia, West Virginia, North Carolina, South Carolina, Georgia, Maryland, and Alabama. Membership in the organization is restricted to the counties identified as "The Southern Highland Region" by John C. Campbell. Juried membership requires a process of submitting images of the artists' work.
