= Frances Louisa Goodrich =

American weaver and archivist

- Born: September 15, 1856; Binghamton, New York
- Died: February 20, 1944 (aged 87); Asheville, North Carolina
- Known for: Weaving, Fiber Arts

Frances Louisa Goodrich (September 15, 1856 – February 20, 1944) was an American weaver, writer, and archivist. She is best known for founding the Allanstand Cottage Industries in 1887.

== Biography ==
Goodrich was born on September 15, 1856, in Binghamton, New York. Her father was a Presbyterian minister and a proponent of the Social Gospel movement. She attended Yale School of Fine Arts and in 1890 she located to North Carolina where she was a volunteer teacher at College Hill. In 1895 she was given a handmade, overshot-woven Double Bow Knot coverlette. She admired the craftsmanship and she then turned her attention to the craft.

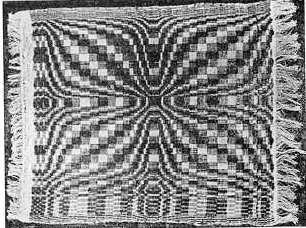
Woven coverlet double bow knot pattern

In 1897 Goodrich established Allanstand Cottage Industries with the mission of providing a way for rural women to earn money and to keep the craft of Appalachian weaving alive. Weaving was particularly suitable as a cash craft for rural women as it could be completed as time allowed, with the weaver simply marking their stopping point with a pin.

In 1900 Goodrich held the first exhibition of Allanstand crafts, and in 1908 she opened a store in the populated city of Asheville, North Carolina. In 1930 Goodrich helped organize the Southern Highland Handicraft Guild (now the Southern Highland Craft Guild) .

Goodrich collected the traditional patterns for the looms. She also wrote a book entitled Mountain Homespun: The Crafts and People of the Southern Appalachians. It was published in 1931 by Yale University Press.

Goodrich donated her textile collection to the Southern Highland Craft Guild.

She died on February 20, 1944, in Asheville, North Carolina.
