= Daniel Garvey =

American academic and administrator

Daniel Garvey is an American academic and administrator. He is a former president of Prescott College in Arizona. Prior to becoming president of Prescott College, Garvey was a professor at the University of New Hampshire.

He taught on several voyages of Semester at Sea and works at Prescott College's Institute for Sustainable Social Change.

== Education ==
Garvey attended Westborough High School. He received a bachelor's degree from Worcester State College, a master's degree from Goddard College, and a Ph.D. from the University of Colorado Boulder.
