= Kishore G. Kulkarni =

Kishore G. Kulkarni has been a Distinguished Professor of Economics at Metropolitan State University of Denver since 1989. He has also taught at the University of Colorado Boulder, University of Denver, Colorado State University and Colorado School of Mines as an adjunct professor. Dr. Kulkarni completed a B.A. in economics, receiving a first rank in merit and an M.A. in economics, receiving a second rank in merit, from the University of Poona, (now called Savitribai Phule Pune University) in India. He migrated to the U.S. in 1976 and completed an additional M.A. and Ph.D. in economics from the University of Pittsburgh. In 1980, he began teaching full time, his true life's passion. He has received international acclaim for his teaching, including a 2001 “Outstanding Teaching Award” by the Golden Key International Honor Society, inclusion of his biography in Who's Who in the World and Who's Who Among America's Teachers (1998), and the “Best Teaching Award” from the Student Economic Society in 2014. Dr. Kulkarni was also selected to teach on the Spring 1994 voyage of the Semester at Sea program, and has delivered many special lectures and seminars in over 30 countries worldwide.

Dr. Kulkarni is an active researcher, and his books, chapters, and articles have received much acclaim over the course of his career. He has authored and/or edited ten books, many of which have become popular textbook choices in US and Indian universities. Most recently, the sixth edition of his macroeconomics textbook was published by Kendall/Hunt Publishing Company in 2019, and he co-edited a book on India, published in May 2020. Over the years, Dr. Kulkarni has authored (or co-authored) 160 refereed journal articles, all of which can be seen on www.researchgate.net.

He serves as the Chief Editor of the International Review of Business and Economics (IRBE). For his numerous research activities, Dr. Kulkarni was recognized with an “Outstanding Faculty Researcher/Scholar” Award by the Golden Key International Honor Society in 1997. In 2004, the Faculty Senate of the Metropolitan State University of Denver awarded him “Distinguished Service Award”, followed by an “Extraordinary Service Award”, awarded by the University President in 2010. In 2012, the Dean of the College of Business recognized Dr. Kulkarni as the first “Distinguished Professor” of the college. Then, in May 2017, he received the Non-Resident Indian Welfare Society's “Pravasi Ratan” award. In March 2019, the Federation of Business Disciplines (FBD) recognized him as an “Outstanding Educator”, and the GISR Foundation in New Delhi awarded him as an “Outstanding Overseas Academician”. In 2021, he also received an award from the Indian Institute of Finance as a “Research Professor in Economics.

To carry out his research activities, Dr. Kulkarni has held visiting fellowships and grants from several institutions, including the Institute of Humane Studies in Arlington VA, the National Institute of Bank Management in Pune, the Reserve Bank of India in Mumbai, and the Indira Gandhi Institute of Development Research in Mumbai.

== Books ==
- Individually Authored Books
  - Principles of Macro-Monetary Economics, Kendall/Hunt Publishing Company, Sixth Edition, May 2019, pp. 1–292
  - Simplified Macro-Monetary Theory, Serials Publications, First Edition, July 2007, pp. 1–335, (out of print)
  - Readings in International Economics: Selected Writings of Prof. Kishore G. Kulkarni, Serials Publications, pp. 1–325, January 2006, Second Edition. (out of print)
- Co-authored books
  - Principles of Microeconomics, with Edwin Dolan, Best Value Textbook Publishing
  - Redding, CA, April 2014, Fourth Edition, pp. 1–477. ISBN 978-1-62751-427-9 (out of print)
  - Role of the Life Insurance Corporation of India (LIC) in the Economic Development of India, with Santosh Choudhury, Himalaya Publishing House, December 1991, pp. 1–138. (Out of Print)
- Edited Books
  - Role of Freedom in Economic Development of India, co-edited by Amitabh S. Dutta. Lambert Academic Publishing, April 2020, pp. 1–341. ISBN 978-620-2-51945-8.
    - Translated into five languages: German, Portuguese, Spanish, French, and Dutch
  - Essays in International Monetary Economics, Serials Publications, January 2016, pp. 1–509. ISBN 978-81-8387-760-2.
  - Economic Development in India and China: New Perspectives on Progress and Change, Co-Edited with Penelope B. Prime, Serials Publications, First Edition, June 2007, pp. 1–355. ISBN 978-81-8387-114-3. (Out of Print)
  - International Economic Review: Post Recession Challenges and Analyses, Matrix Publishers, First Edition, June 2012, pp. 1–452. ISBN 978-93-81320-09-9.
  - International Economic Development: Theories, Models and Case Studies of Countries Leading the Change, Matrix Publishers, First Edition, August 2010, pp. 1–396. ISBN 81-910142-3-8.
- Individually Authored or Co-authored Book Chapters or Monographs
  - “Globalization, Trade Liberalization and Free Market Economy—Can There Be a Promise of Economic Success for Nepal?” in V. S. Seshaiah edited, Economic Liberalization and Trade: Issues in Economic Development, ICFAI Books, 2004, pp. 94–107.
  - “Globalization and Challenges to Bank Regulation in India: Post 1991 Period”, in K. Sham Bhat edited, “Issues in Financial Development”, Serials Publications, 2004, pp. 319–331, Co-author: Meenakshi Rishi
  - “A Test of Monetary Model of Imported Inflation: A Comparison of India’s Case with Open Economies”, included in, “Economic Reforms and Perspectives”, B. Nagarjuna edited, Serials Publications, 2004, pp. 69–82, Co-author: Meenakshi Rishi
  - “India’s Foreign Trade and Balance of Payment: A Review of Her Current Account after Independence”, chapter included in Varkey Titus edited, Economic Liberalization: Its impact on Business, Politics and Economy of India, June 1997, pp. 1–450. Also served as Associate Editor of the book.
  - “Role of the LIC in Total Saving Mobilization in India”, National Insurance Academy, August 1991, pp. 1–28.
  - “Saving Behavior in Monetary Sector of India”, Indira Gandhi Institute of Development Research, 1988, pp. 1–23.
  - “Distribution and Marketing of Fresh Vegetables in Arkansas”, Winrock International Institute of Agricultural Development, January 1986, pp. 1–32.
  - “Trend in Agricultural Development of Arkansas: Past, Present and Future”, Winrock International Institute of Agricultural Development, May 1985, pp. 1–35.

== Awards ==
- Indian Institute of Finance, Research Professor Award, December 2021
- Golden Key International Honor Society, Metropolitan State University of Denver Chapter, Honorary Membership, for Outstanding Service to the University and Society, 1998-Current
- Southwestern Society of Economists and with Federation of Business Disciplines, “Outstanding Educator”, 2018–2019
- Non-Resident Indians Welfare Society, New Delhi, India, “Prawasi-Rattan Award” (“Jewels of Those Who Left the Country”), 2017
- Metropolitan State University of Denver, Student Economic Society, “Excellence in Teaching”, presented in recognition of outstanding teaching and tireless dedication to student success, May 2015
- Metropolitan State University of Denver, College of Business, “Distinguished Professor”, presented by the Dean, April 2012
- Metropolitan State University of Denver, “Extraordinary Service to the College”, presented by Faculty Senate, 2010
- Metropolitan State University of Denver,“Distinguished Service to the College and Community”, presented by Faculty Senate, 2004
- Metropolitan State University of Denver, School of Business, Outstanding Faculty Member in Professional Development, 1997–2004
- Golden Key International Honor Society, Metropolitan State University of Denver Chapter, Excellence in Teaching, a life-time achievement award, 2001
- Metropolitan State University of Denver, Golden Key National Honor Society, Outstanding Faculty Researcher/Scholar Award,1997
- Government of India, National Merit Scholarship,1974-1976
- A.G. College, Pune, India, College Merit Scholarship for Junior and Senior years, 1972–1974
- University of Poona, India, Mr. S.K. Shinde Prize for the First Rank in B.A. examination, June 1974
- The only faculty member at the MSU-Denver to receive all five faculty awards: Distinguished Professor, Outstanding Teaching, Outstanding Researcher/Scholar, Distinguished Service to the college, and Extraordinary Service to the college
- Invited to present paper in “Oxford Roundtable Conference” Oxford University, England, July 21–31, 2005.
- Teaching Evaluation Index in top 5%-10% at all departments served. Received Best Teaching Evaluation Index for numerous terms.
- More than 40 Research Grants from the University of Central Arkansas, Northeast Louisiana University, Reserve Bank of India and Metropolitan State University of Denver, and Institute of Humane Studies (IHS), Arlington, VA.
- Biography included in a) Who's Who of the South and Southwest, 1986, 1988, and 1989 Editions, b) Who's Who of Emerging Leaders in America, 1987, 1988, and 1989, 1992, 1993 Editions, c) Who's Who in American Education, 1992–93, 1994, 2006, 2007 Editions d) Who's Who in the World, 2005, 2006, 2018 Editions e) Who's Who in America, 2008, 2009 and 2010 Editions
- Various Grants (total up to $25,000) from the Institute of Humane Studies (HIS) Virginia for inviting guest speakers on the campus to address economics students and hold conferences, 2016-2021
