= Geoffrey Robert Quaife =

Historian

G. R. Quaife
- Born: Geoffrey Robert Quaife
- Education: University of Melbourne (Australia)
- Occupation: Historian

Geoffrey Robert Quaife, is an Australian social historian, specialising in the history of the peasantry and witchcraft in early modern Europe. He was an associate professor, Head of the History Department, Chair of the Academic Board and Dean of Arts at the University of New England (Australia), from which he received an honorary doctorate in the year 2000.

== Personal life ==
Quaife married Linifred Gretel Williams in 1959, and has three children, Evan, Christian and Verity, twelve grandchildren and four great grandchildren. Both his wife and his son, Evan, have been credited in the prefaces of his books as having assisted Quaife in his research.

Since retirement from the University of New England in 2000 Quaife has written fourteen historical murder mysteries, The Luke Tremayme Adventures.

== Works ==
- Quaife, G.R. (1975). Gold and Colonial Society, 1851-1870. North Melbourne: Cassell Australia. ISBN 9780726973192.
- Quaife, G.R. (1979). Wanton Wenches and Wayward Wives: Peasants and Illicit Sex in Early Seventeenth Century England. Oxfordshire: Taylor & Francis. ISBN 9780429615122.
- Quaife, G.R. (1987). Godly Zeal and Furious Rage: The Witch in Early Modern Europe. Oxfordshire: Taylor & Francis. ISBN 9781136740251.
