= Jane Hicks Gentry =

- Born: Jane Hicks; December 18, 1863; Watauga County, North Carolina
- Died: May 25, 1925 (aged 61); Madison County, North Carolina
- Resting place: Odd Fellows Cemetery; Hot Springs, North Carolina
- Known for: Appalachian folklore and songs
- Spouse: Jasper Newton Gentry
- Children: 9
- Parent(s): Ransom Merritt Hicks; Emily Harmon

Jane Hicks Gentry (December 18, 1863 – May 25, 1925) was an Appalachian folklorist and singer, born in Watauga County, North Carolina. She was known for her riddles and the "Jack, Will and Tom Tales", in addition to the songs she recorded for Cecil Sharp. All were believed to have originated in England, Scotland or Germany, and passed down through Jane's family to her.

== Background ==
She was the oldest of five children born to Emily Harmon and Ransom Hicks. Her brothers and sisters were John Riley, Mary, Margaret Elizabeth and William. The paternal Hicks lineage were emigrants from England who arrived in America prior to the American Revolutionary War. The Harmons in the maternal lineage came to America from Wurttemberg, Germany, also before the American Revolutionary War. When Emily was about 12 or 13 years old, they joined other families in moving to Madison County, on the Meadow Fork of Spring Creek, where they began to invest in farm acreage. As Emily worked inside their home, surrounded by the children, she sang songs and told stories and riddles that had been passed down through the Harmon family. Jane had only a rudimentary education, but learned the basics of reading in order to facilitate her reading of the Bible.

Jane married Jasper Newton "Newt" Gentry in 1879, and the couple had nine children (Lydia Nora, Martha Emily, Mary Magdalene, Alfred Chanay, Allie Mae, Lillie Bertha Maud, Roy Stevens, Lalla Marvin, Nola Jane). Their youngest child was born after they moved to Hot Springs. There they bought acreage on which they raised livestock and farm produce. The Gentry children were enrolled in the Presbyterian-run Dorland Institute, their tuition paid through income from a grocery store run by Newt, where he sold produce grown on their land. Jane earned money by working at the school. Over the years, she supervised students who also worked at the school. Jane became part of the school's culture by continuing to tell her stories, sing a little and dance for the students and faculty.

Eventually Jane ran a boarding house that welcomed students and faculty of the school. A friend of the family remembered, "She wove, spun, tatted, knit, crocheted, and she was always teaching other people to do these things. And she would sing and tell stories while we worked. It seemed natural for her to sing and tell stories." The United States government turned Mountain Park Hotel at Hot Springs into a World War I prisoner-of-war internment camp for German sailors. Families of the prisoners lived in town, some at Jane's boarding house.

== Songs and stories ==
English folk song collector Cecil Sharp and his colleague Maud Karpeles were invited to Appalachia by American folklorist Olive Dame Campbell in 1916 to seek out old songs and ballads, especially those that had travelled from the British Isles. It was Dorland principal Lucy Shafer who suggested they meet Jane Gentry. From August 24, 1916, until July 27, 1917, Sharp and Karpeles made several visits to notate Jane's songs, obtaining a total of 70 from her.

Table: Ballads and Songs Sung By Mrs. Jane Gentry and Collected by Olive Dame Campbell and Cecil James Sharp, Published in: English folk songs from the southern Appalachians
	Date Sung	Entry	Type	Title	Scale
1	Sept. 12, 1916	1 B	Ballad	The False Knight Upon the Road	Pentatonic Mode 3, b (no 6th)
2	Sept. 11, 1916	4 A	Ballad	The Two Sisters	Pentatonic Mode 3
3	Aug. 24, 1916	7 A	Ballad	Edward	Heptatonic Mode 4 a+b (mixolydian)
4	Aug. 24, 1916	13 B	Ballad	The Cherry-Tree Carol	Pentatonic Mode 3
5	Aug. 24, 1916	14	Ballad	Fair Annie	Pentatonic Mode 3
6	Aug. 24, 1916	15 A	Ballad	Young Hunting	Hexatonic Mode 2, a
7	Aug. 24, 1916	16 E	Ballad	Lord Thomas and Fair Ellinor	Pentatonic Mode 1
8	Aug. 24, 1916	19	Ballad	The Wife of Usher's Well	Hexatonic Mode 2, a
9	Aug. 24, 1916	20 B	Ballad	Little Musgrave and Lady Barnard	Pentatonic Mode 3
10	Sept. 12, 1916	23	Ballad	Lamkin	Pentatonic Mode 3 (Tonic A)
11	Aug. 25, 1916	25	Ballad	Johnie Scot	Pentatonic Mode 3
12	Sept. 14, 1916	27 D	Ballad	The Gypsy Laddie	Hexatonic Mode 4, b
13	Sept. 14, 1916	28 B	Ballad	Geordie	Hexatonic Mode 2, a
14	Sept. 12, 1916	29 H	Ballad	The Daemon Lover	Hexatonic Mode 4, a
15	Aug. 24, 1916	30	Ballad	The Grey Cock	Heptatonic, Mode 3, a+b (mixolydian)
16	Sept. 16, 1916	32 A	Ballad	Our Goodman	Pentatonic Mode 3 (no 6th)
17	Sept. 12, 1916	35 A	Ballad	The Golden Vanity	Heptatonic Mode 4, a+b (dorian)
18	Sept. 14, 1916	38 D	Ballad	In Seaport Town	Heptatonic Mode 4, a+b (mixolydian)
19	Aug. 25, 1916	40 A	Ballad	Shooting of His Dear	Pentatonic Mode 1 (no 6th)
20	Aug. 25, 1916	46 A	Ballad	Edwin in the Lowlands Low	Pentatonic Mode 1
21	Sept. 12, 1916	48	Ballad	The Green Bed	Hexatonic Mode 4, b
22	Aug. 26, 1916	55 A	Ballad	Jack Went A-Sailing	Pentatonic Mode 3
23	Aug. 25, 1916	56 A	Song	The Rejected Lover	Hexatonic Mode 2, a
24	Sept. 14, 1916	64 D	Song	The Wagoner's Lad	Pentatonic Mode 1
25	Sept. 12, 1916	65 E	Song	Come All You Fair and Tender Ladies	Hexatonic Mode 4, a (If C be tonic: Mode 3, a).
26	Aug. 24, 1916	68	Song	William and Polly	Hexatonic Mode 3, b
27	Sept. 14, 1916	72 D	Song	Early, Early in the Spring	Pentatonic Mode 3
28	Aug. 24, 1916	82 A	Song	George Reilly	Heptatonic Mode 2, a+b (dorian) (If G be tonic: Mode 4, a+b mixolydian)
29	Aug. 24, 1916	83 A	Song	Johnny Doyle	Hexatonic Mode 4, a (If D be tonic: Mode 3, a)
30	Sept. 16, 1916	89 A	Song	My Boy Billy	Hexatonic Mode 3, b.
31	Aug. 24, 1916	95 B	Song	Pretty Peggy O	Hexatonic Mode 1, b
32	Aug. 24, 1916	97 B	Song	The Sheffield Apprentice	Hexatonic Mode 2, a
33	Aug. 25, 1916	98 B	Song	The Broken Token	Heptatonic Mode 3, a+b (with flattened 7th)
34	Aug. 25, 1916	101 B	Song	The Brisk Young Lover	Heptatonic Mode 1, a+b (mixolydian)
35	Aug. 24, 1916	108 A	Song	My Mother Bid Me	Pentatonic Mode 3, a
36	Sept. 12, 1916	110 A	Song	The Tree in the Wood	Pentatonic Mode 3
37	Sept. 12, 1916	111	Nursery Song	The Farmyard	Pentatonic Mode 3 (no 6th)
38	Sept. 12, 1916	112	Nursery Song	The Drummer and His wie	Pentatonic Mode 1 (If G be tonic: Mode 3)
39	Sept. 12, 1916	113	Nursery Song	The Bird Song	Pentatonic Mode 2
40	Sept. 15, 1916	117	Nursery Song	Sing, Said the Mother	Hexatonic Mode 3, b
41	Sept. 15, 1916	118	Nursery Song	I Whipped My Horse	Pentatonic Mode 3
42	Sept. 15, 1916	119 A	Nursery Song	A Frog Went A-courting	Hexatonic Mode 3, b (Tone F)

Sharp did not comment specifically on the likely origin of her songs, but believed that in general the older Appalachian ballads came from England or Lowland Scotland. Holgar Nygard, Professor Emeritus of English at Duke University, suggested that Scotland was the more likely source for many of the songs in Jane's repertoire, but Brian Peters, in a detailed study of Sharp's Appalachian collection, showed that ballads such as "Barbara Allen", "Little Musgrave" and "Lord Thomas and Fair Ellender" most likely originated in England.

Jane referred to her stories as "Jack, Will and Tom Tales". Musician and historian Betty N. Smith compared the structure of the tales to German Märchen fairy tales, but speculated that they may have originated with the Hick's English ancestors. Author Irving Bacheller and his wife Anna first met Jane at her boarding house in 1914, telling stories and riddles to delighted children. The Bachellers were so impressed with Jane that they invited her to visit them in Greenwich, Connecticut. According to Betty N. Smith's research, the visit was incorporated into Bacheller's novel Tower of a Hundred Bells, destroyed by a house fire in 1917, a fact confirmed after Jane's death, in a letter from Bacheller to her daughter Maud Long, "I wrote a book largely about your mother and her mountain life which was destroyed by a fire that burned my home in 1917."

Fifteen stories of Jane's were contained within twenty-three stories total published by Isabel Gordon Carter in The Journal of American Folklore in 1925. The other stories in the published work were six by Susie Wilkenson of Sevier County, Tennessee, and two stories by John Campbell of Townsend, Tennessee. As noted by Carter, folklorists of the time had primarily collected songs and overlooked the stories. When Jane was asked to tell the tales for this work, she confirmed in part that the stories had been passed down in the family, from her great-grandmother passing them down to Jane's grandfather Council Harmon.

Jane's daughter Maud Long later recorded some of the stories for the Archive of American Folk Song at the Library of Congress.

== Death ==
Newt Gentry died March 24, 1922.

Jane died in May 1925. Her obituary noted her knowledge of old English and Scottish folksongs.

== Bibliography ==
- Smith, Betty N. (2015). Jane Hicks Gentry: A Singer Among Singers. The University Press of Kentucky. ISBN 978-0-8131-4835-9 – via Project MUSE.
