= Krista E. Wiegand =

American political scientist

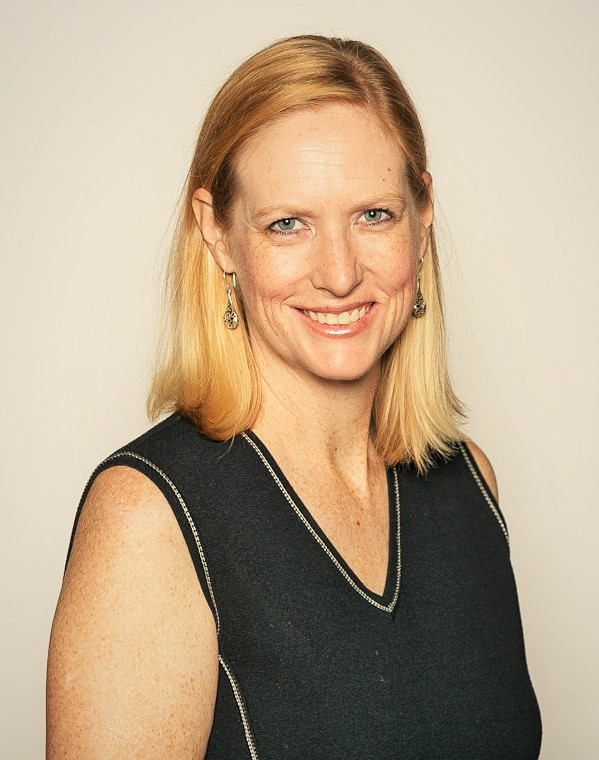
- Born: February 19, 1971 (age 55); Miami, Florida, USA
- Spouse: Michael L. Jordan
- Children: 1

Academic background
- Education: BA, International Studies, 1993, MA, Comparative & Regional Studies: Middle East, 1997, American University School of International Service; MA, Political Science, 2001, PhD, Political Science, 2004, Duke University
- Thesis: Religious, ancestral, and national identity: political use and abuse in Lebanon (1997)
- Website: kristawiegand.com

Krista Eileen Wiegand (born February 19, 1971) is an American political scientist. She is a full professor and Head of the School of Social Sciences at Monash University in Melbourne, Australia.

== Early life and education ==
Wiegand was born on February 19, 1971, in Miami, Florida. She earned her Bachelor of Arts degree and first Master's degree from the American University School of International Service. From there, she enrolled at Duke University for her second master's degree and PhD.

After graduating from the American University School of International Service, Wiegand travelled to Beirut with her Lebanese-American friends where she learned about the Lebanese Civil War. As a result, she chose to write her master's thesis on this topic. The following summer, she returned to Lebanon to continue her research but her friends were detained by Hezbollah for "helping an American." She stated that she was "grilled for several hours about America’s involvement with Israel." Afterward, she was recruited by the CIA for a job in covert operations, which she declined.

== Career ==
Wiegand is a specialist in international relations, focusing on international and civil conflict, conflict resolution, and Indo-Pacific security. She is an expert on territorial and maritime disputes, particularly the disputes in the South China Sea, East China Sea, and the Sea of Japan, and a specialist in maritime international law. She was a Professor and Director of the Center for National Security and Foreign Affairs at the Howard H. Baker School of Public Policy and Public Affairs, until June 2026.

Wiegand joined the faculty at Georgia Southern University (GSU) in 2005 as an assistant professor in their Department of Political Science and served as Director of the Honors Program in Political Science. She stayed at GSU for nine years before accepting a position at the University of Tennessee (UT).

Upon joining the faculty at UT, Wiegand became an associate professor of Political Science and Director of the Global Security Program at the Howard H. Baker Jr. Center for Public Policy. As Director of the Center for National Security and Foreign Affairs since 2023, Wiegand directed multiple government-funded grants, conducts policy-relevant research on international conflict, organized and hosted a series of events and workshops, and worked with faculty fellows and affiliates across multiple disciplines and partner institutions at UTK, across the US, and in Japan.

Wiegand started her position as Head of the School of Social Sciences at Monash University in July 2026. In this role, she oversees four sections: Politics & International Relations; Criminology; Sociology, Gender Studies & Behavioural Studies; and Human Geography, Anthropology & Development Studies. She is a Professor in Politics & International Relations in the School of Social Sciences at Monash University.

In 2015, Wiegand taught for the Semester at Sea program. In 2017, Wiegand accepted a Fulbright senior scholarship which sent her to the Philippines for research purposes for five months. Two years later, she was appointed the Co-Editor-in-Chief of the journal International Studies Quarterly, flagship journal of the International Studies Association, with Brandon Prins from 2019 until the end of 2023. In 2025, Wiegand served as a Fulbright Specialist at Don Mariano Marcos Memorial State University in La Union, Philippines working with faculty, staff, and students on governance, conflict management, and the role of academic institutions in strengthening local resilience.

== Selected publications ==
The following is a list of selected publications

- The Peaceful Resolution of Territorial and Maritime Disputes (2023)
- Enduring Territorial Disputes: Strategies of Bargaining, Coercive Diplomacy, and Settlement (2011)
- Bombs and Ballots: Governance by Islamic Terrorist and Guerrilla Groups (2010)

== Personal life ==
Wiegand and her husband Michael L. Jordan have one child together.
