= Pacific Environment =

US environmental organization

- Founded: 1987, San Francisco, California, United States
- Purpose: Environmentalism
- Headquarters: San Francisco, CA
- Region served: Pacific Rim and the Arctic
- Method: Funding grassroots groups, promoting best practice, forging coalitions between environmentalist groups
- Executive Director: Shannon Wright
- Board of directors: Peter Riggs (Board Chair), Yu Aiqun (Board Secretary), Vawter "Buck" Parker (Board Treasurer), James Angell, Stuart Kaplan, Fanny Lam, Joanne Spalding, Jodie Van Horn
- Website: www.pacificenvironment.org

Pacific Environment is an environmental non-profit organization based in San Francisco, California, United States, founded in 1980. The organization works across the Pacific Rim and the Arctic on issues related to climate policy, plastic pollution, ocean biodiversity, and Arctic ecosystems. Its mission is to confront our most urgent environmental issues by connecting local and global movements, catalyzing policy change, and inspiring action for the benefit of people and our planet.

Shannon Wright has served as its executive director since 2024.

== History ==
The organization was founded 1980 as Pacific Energy and Resources Center by Armin Rosencranz. In its early years, the organization focused on cross-border environmental cooperation and resource extraction issues, particularly in the Russian Far East.

In 1991, Pacific Environment became the first international organization to bring widespread attention to the threats facing the Siberian taiga, beginning a long history of work in Russia. In 1993, a Pacific Environment campaign with Russian partners led to the creation of the Botcha Nature Reserve, protecting valuable forests in the Russian Far East that were to be logged by Weyerhaeuser Corporation. That same year, Pacific Environment worked with the Udege people in the Russian Far East to protect the three-million-acre (1.2-million-hectare) upper Bikin Watershed against logging by the Hyundai Corporation. This area is now a wildlife refuge.

In the late 1990s, Pacific Environment helped coordinate the "Ring of Fire" coalition, which opposed a proposed international agreement concerning logging practices.

In the 2000s, Pacific Environment expanded its work in China and the Arctic region, partnering with domestic environmental groups on public participation and environmental oversight initiatives. In China, the organization worked with local groups on media engagement and monitoring of environmental impacts associated with development projects. Pacific Environment collaborated with organizations including Greener Beijing on public awareness campaigns related to wildlife consumption. In Hainan Province, an online campaign drew attention to the consumption of turtle and tortoise species. Following a government investigation and increased public scrutiny, the Hainan Yang Sheng Tan Company halted imports of turtle and tortoise species.

In 2004, debates over a proposed dam on the Nu River drew national media attention. Contemporary reporting noted the involvement of environmental groups and journalists in raising concerns about the project. Chinese Premier Wen Jiabao subsequently ordered officials to reconsider the proposal.

In the 2010s and early 2020s, Pacific Environment reduced and ultimately concluded its programmatic work in Russia. The organization subsequently focused more fully on environmental policy issues across the broader Pacific Rim and in international environmental governance processes.

== Organization ==
Pacific Environment employs more than 50 employees and maintains a presence in multiple countries, including China, Japan, Malaysia, the Philippines, the Republic of Korea, Singapore, Thailand, Vietnam, and the United States.

Pacific Environment receives funding from foundations and other institutional donors, as well as individual contributions. According to publicly available tax filings, the majority of its funding has historically come from foundation grants.

The organization participates in coalitions and networks focused on environmental policy, including international initiatives related to climate change, ecosystem protection, marine protected areas, and efforts to address plastic pollution.

== Areas of work ==
Pacific Environment's work is organized around four primary programs: Climate, Plastics, Marine, and Arctic.

=== Climate ===
The Climate Program engages in policy initiatives related to renewable energy development and the reduction of greenhouse gas emissions from the maritime shipping sector. Its activities include participation in regulatory processes concerning fuel standards and zero-emission vessel technologies.

=== Plastics ===
The Plastics Program works on policy measures addressing plastic production and waste management. This includes engagement in sector-specific plastic reduction initiatives in areas such as tourism, hospitality, and education, as well as participation in international negotiations toward a global plastics agreement.

=== Marine ===
The Marine Program participates in policy processes concerning marine wildlife protection, marine protected areas, and coastal ecosystem management.

=== Arctic ===
The Arctic Program engages in environmental policy discussions related to Arctic communities, energy development, and ecosystem management in the Arctic region.

Across these areas, the organization participates in coalition efforts and regulatory processes at national and international levels. Its activities have included engagement in United Nations climate negotiations under the UNFCCC, discussions at the International Maritime Organization, negotiations toward a global plastics agreement, and processes related to the Kunming–Montreal Global Biodiversity Framework and the Biodiversity Beyond National Jurisdiction agreement.

== See also ==
- Environmental issues in the United States
