= Ray Hicks =

American storyteller (1922–2003)

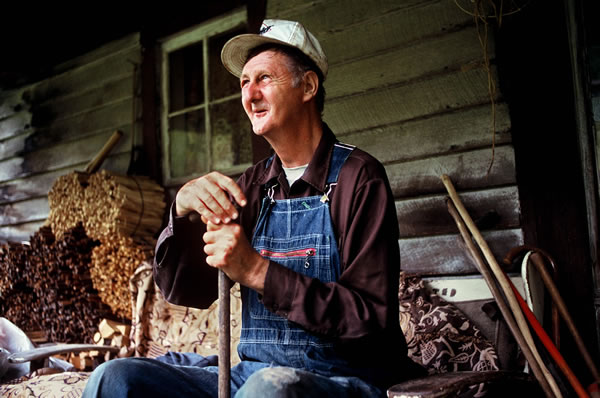
- Hicks in 1983
- Born: Lenard Ray Hicks; August 29, 1922; Banner Elk, North Carolina, U.S.
- Died: April 20, 2003 (aged 80); Boone, North Carolina, U.S.
- Occupations: Storyteller, farmer, mechanic
- Years active: 1951–2003
- Known for: Jack tales

Lenard Ray Hicks (August 29, 1922 – April 20, 2003) was an Appalachian storyteller who lived his entire life on Beech Mountain, North Carolina. He was particularly known for the telling of Jack Tales.

He was a recipient of a 1983 National Heritage Fellowship awarded by the National Endowment for the Arts, which is the United States government's highest honor in the folk and traditional arts.

== Biography ==
Ray Hicks was born on August 29, 1922, in Banner Elk, North Carolina. He was the fourth of 11 children of Nathan and Rena Hicks. He had Cherokee ancestry, traced through his great-grandmother.

Storytelling and ballad-singing were a big part of life with the Hicks family. Ray was in the eighth generation of family storytellers. Nathan played banjo and dulcimer and encouraged Ray to sing along with him. Ray's cousin, Frank Proffitt, was also a talented musician, known for his performance of the ballad "Tom Dooley" among others.

The Hicks family lived in conditions of extreme poverty in the relatively isolated mountains of North Carolina near Banner Elk. The family got by selling carpets handwoven by Rena and dulcimers crafted by Nathan as well as other work. In 1945, Nathan committed suicide. Ray was drafted into the army, but was rejected because he had broken his arm. Rena died in 1975, leaving Ray the Hicks' home-place and child raising duties for his younger siblings.

Ray married Rosa Violet Harmon. Rosa also grew up in Beech Mountain. The couple's daily lives in their Beech Mountain home embodied the traditional culture and practices of their community. They raised their five children in a cabin built by Ray's grandfather.

Hicks died of prostate cancer at a nursing home in Boone, North Carolina, on April 20, 2003. His wife Rosa died on January 31, 2014.

== Career ==
As an adult, he worked as a farmer and mechanic. To earn extra money, Hicks also foraged various plants and materials from the forest, a skill he had learned as a boy.

In 1951, Hicks was invited to visit a teacher's classroom at Cove Creek Elementary School. It was the first time he told stories in a public setting.

Hicks was best known for his stories known as Jack Tales. Jack tales consist of fairy tale elements with intertwined Southern Appalachian culture. Some examples of Jack Tales are "Jack and the Beanstalk" and "Jack and the Giant Killer".

As a featured performer, Hicks took the stage at the first National Storytelling Festival in Jonesborough, Tennessee, on October 7, 1973. After this performance, he was invited back many times in the years that followed.

Hicks was well known for his unique brogue and was even studied by a linguist from England. He was featured in The New Yorker magazine and in some documentaries.

== Awards and honors ==
In 1983, Hicks received a National Heritage Fellowship, which is a lifetime honor given to master folk and traditional artists.

In 1991, he received a North Carolina Folk Heritage Award.
