= Folk Art Center =

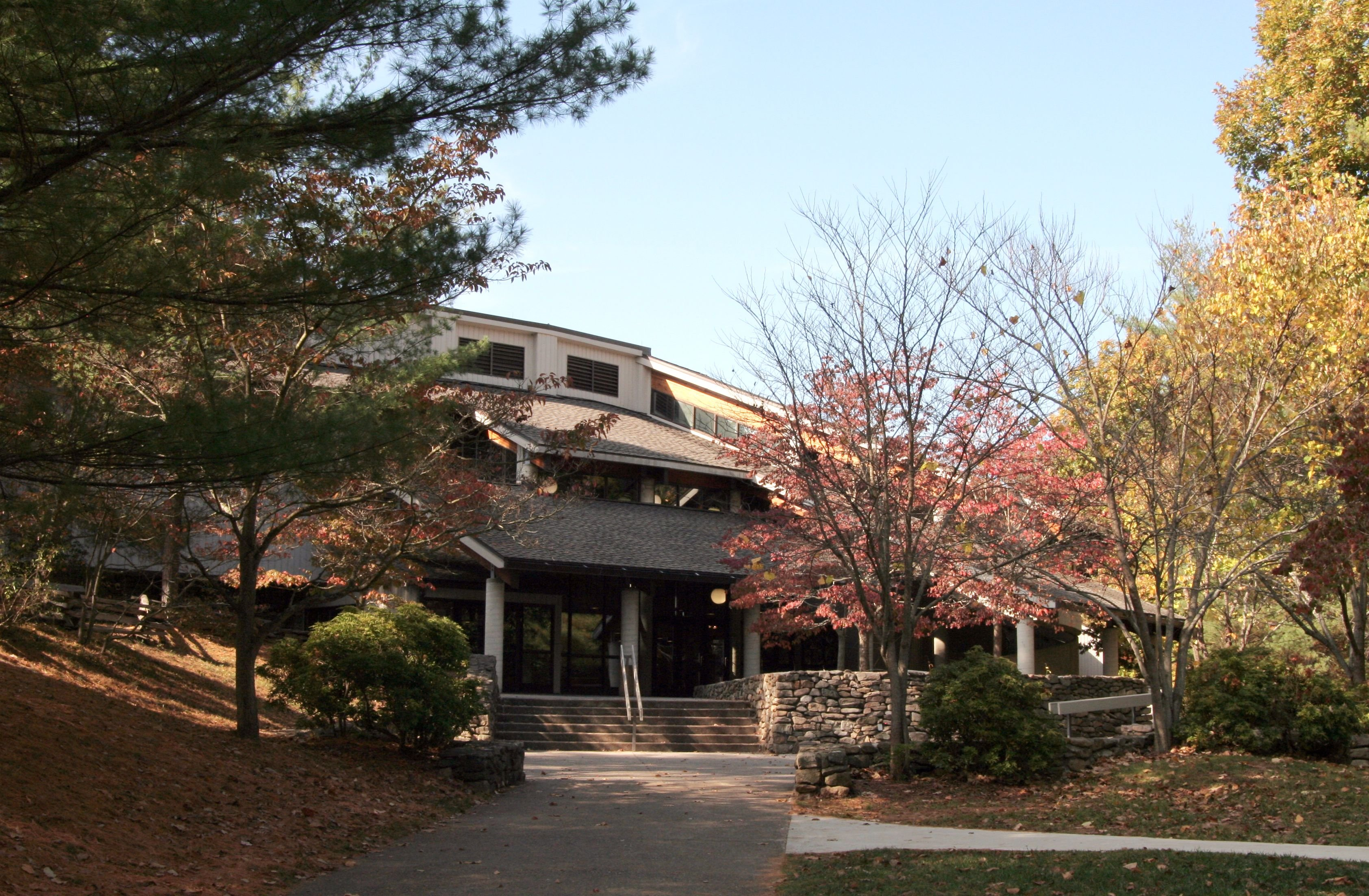

- Folk Art Center Folk Art Center (the United States)
- Established: 1980
- Location: Asheville, NC
- Coordinates: 35.592352°N 82.482066°W
- Type: Art museum
- Collection size: 3,500
- Visitors: 250,000
- Parking: On site (no charge)

The Folk Art Center is a museum of Appalachian folk art and crafts located at milepost 382 on the Blue Ridge Parkway near Asheville, North Carolina. It also houses offices for three separate Parkway partners: the Southern Highland Craft Guild, the National Park Service, and Eastern National (known as EN).

The Center is a cooperative effort between the Southern Highland Craft Guild, the National Park Service, and the Appalachian Regional Commission and is the most popular attraction on the Parkway, seeing a quarter of a million visitors per year.

Opened to the public at its current location in 1980, the Center contains three galleries, a library, and an auditorium, and also houses the Eastern National bookstore and information center. Admission is free.

== History ==
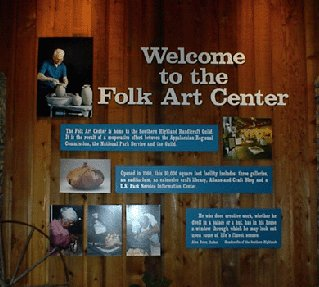
