= Isabel Gordon Carter =

American folklorist (1897–1988)

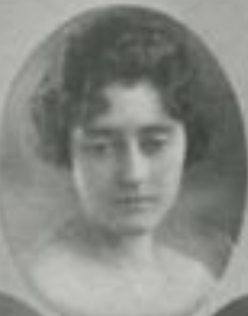
- Carter, from the 1920 yearbook of the University of Tennessee
- Born: May 2, 1897; Beloit, Wisconsin, U.S.
- Died: March 21, 1988 (aged 90)
- Occupations: Folklorist, anthropologist, college professor
- Known for: Studies in Appalachia

Isabel Gordon Carter (May 2, 1897 – March 21, 1988) was an American anthropologist, folklorist and professor of social work at the University of Pennsylvania. In the 1920s she recorded and published folk songs and stories of Appalachia.

== Early life and education ==
Carter was born in Beloit, Wisconsin, and raised in Nebraska and Tennessee, the daughter of Charles Henry Gordon and Mary Ett Hydorn. Her father was a geology professor at the University of Tennessee. She graduated from Albion College in 1917, and earned a master's degree from the University of Tennessee in 1920, with a thesis on poet John Masefield. She completed her Ph.D. in anthropology at Columbia University.

== Career ==
In 1923 Carter collected folk songs and tales in the mountains of Tennessee and North Carolina, including a session with Jane Hicks Gentry, a celebrated singer and storyteller in Hot Springs, North Carolina. She was an active member of the American Anthropological Association in the 1920s.

Carter was also a professor of social work at the University of Pennsylvania, and chair of the school's Department of Social Research. Before 1938 she was deputy secretary of public assistance for the state of Pennsylvania. She was leader of the Public Welfare Institute in North Carolina in 1938.

== Publications ==
- "Mountain White Folk-Lore: Tales from the Southern Blue Ridge" (1925)
- "Reduction of Variability in an Inbred Population" (1928)
- "Physical measurements of ‘Old American’ college women" (1932)
- "Some Songs and Ballads from Tennessee and North Carolina" (1933)
- "Mountain White Riddles" (1934)
- Pennsylvania Children and the Depression (1935)
- "Appraising the Social Security Program" (1939, editor)
- "Legislators Define Childhood" (1940)

== Personal life ==
Gordon married Hugh Sevier Carter in 1925. They had daughters Eleanor and Janet. She died in 1988, at the age of 90, a few weeks before her husband's death. Her papers are in the America Folklife Center, Library of Congress. There is also a collection of her research materials in the Calvin M. McClung Historical Collection at the Knoxville Public Library.
