= Beadforlife =

- Headquarters: Niwot, Colorado
- Website: beadforlife.org

BeadforLife is a 501(c)(3), non-profit organization. that empowers women living in poverty to earn income by creating jewelry from recycled paper beads. These beads educate people around the world around the needs and conditions of those living in poverty. Profits from bead sales go towards entrepreneurial training for women, so they can launch businesses and transform their lives. BeadforLife programs have reached more than 89,000 people.

== Mission statement ==
"BeadforLife creates sustainable opportunities for women to lift their families out of extreme poverty by connecting people worldwide in a circle of exchange that enriches everyone".
