= Semester at Sea =

Study abroad program

- Established: 1963
- Mission: Study-abroad program
- Focus: Worldwide
- Key people: Scott Marshall (President/CEO)
- Formerly called: University of the Seven Seas; World Campus Afloat
- Location: Fort Collins, Colorado, United States
- Website: https://www.semesteratsea.org

Semester at Sea (SAS) is a study-abroad program founded in 1963 and managed by the nonprofit Institute for Shipboard Education (ISE) in Fort Collins, Colorado. Colorado State University is the current academic sponsor and the program is conducted on a cruise ship. Nearly 73,000 undergraduate students from more than 1,500 colleges and universities have participated in Semester at Sea.

Each spring and fall semester, up to 600 undergraduates participate in the 100- to 110-day program. During the semester, the ship often circumnavigates the globe, traveling east (across the Atlantic) or west (across the Pacific) and visiting 10 to 11 countries in Asia, Africa, Europe, South America, and North America. Although the program sometimes has voyages through the Mediterranean Sea and the Suez Canal, piracy concerns in the Gulf of Aden have often caused the voyage to go around the southern part of Africa.

== History ==
In 1926, James Edwin Lough of New York University organized the Floating University, an educational seven-month around-the-world voyage, for which he sailed as dean. The voyage, which took place aboard the Holland America liner SS Ryndam, embarked from and returned to Hoboken, New Jersey, on September 18. after traveling 35,000 miles and visiting 47 ports in 33 countries. Former Kansas Governor Henry J. Allen sailed as a member of the faculty, while the government class interviewed the King of Siam and Benito Mussolini. According to contemporary reporting, commencement exercises for the program were held aboard ship, reportedly marking the first college graduation ceremony conducted at sea, while the King of Siam invited the group to Bangkok as official guests during the voyage. The Floating University had a second voyage that sailed aboard the SS President Wilson in 1928. Contemporary newspaper commentary likened the program to the traditional European "Grand Tour" and described it as part of a broader movement to incorporate international travel into undergraduate education.

=== 1960s–1989 ===
Inspired by the Floating University, in 1963, businessman Bill Hughes founded The University of the Seven Seas, which chartered the Holland America liner MS Seven Seas. The first voyage sailed later that year.

Early plans for the program included a proposed land-based campus in Ramona, California, where students would spend part of their studies between voyages. The founders envisioned a flexible international program combining shipboard study, overseas study, and coursework at the California campus.

In 1965, Chapman College became the program's academic sponsor. The following year, the program name was changed to World Campus Afloat. Two new ships were then used for the program, the SS Ryndam (II) and, beginning in 1977, SS Universe, the latter of which was provided by shipping magnate C.Y. Tung from his own fleet. Contemporary reporting stated that use of a ship had been provided to the program “at cost” beginning in 1971.

Citing financial difficulties, compounded by the oil crisis, Chapman terminated its affiliation with the program in 1975. In 1977, the program name again changed, this time to Semester at Sea, and academic sponsorship had moved to the University of Colorado Boulder.

On 8 October 1979, 350 Semester at Sea students visited the People's Republic of China as part of one of the largest groups of American students to visit the country following U.S. recognition of the mainland government.

In June 1980, the University of Pittsburgh signed an agreement to become the academic sponsor of the Semester at Sea program. When C.Y. Tung died in 1982, his family continued to subsidize the program.

In 1988, Philippine President Corazon Aquino boarded the ship to speak to the students and passengers.

=== 1990–1999 ===
During the Fall 1993 voyage, an interpreter for Mikhail Gorbachev joined the program and arranged for several Semester at Sea students to meet the former Soviet leader in Moscow.

Students aboard a Semester at Sea voyage visited Hong Kong in 1994 and met C.Y.'s son Tung Chee-hwa, whose family had longstanding ties to the program through the Institute for Shipboard Education and his father's Seawise Foundation. Three years later, Tung became the first Chief Executive of Hong Kong.

Also in 1994, Semester at Sea included Vietnam on its itinerary for the first time since the end of the Vietnam War, in 1975. The program stated that its students would be among the first from the United States to visit the country since the lifting of the U.S. trade embargo against Vietnam. During a visit to South Africa that same year, Semester at Sea students attended an African National Congress rally where Nelson Mandela introduced the group to the crowd and asked the students to stand and be recognized.

In 1996, on behalf of Semester at Sea, C.Y. Tung's Seawise Foundation leased the SS Universe Explorer, a much larger ship than its predecessor, the SS Universe, which had been experiencing mechanical issues. That same year, ISE began hosting a shorter summer Semester at Sea program focused on a single region, as well as its first summer voyage, a 57-day South Pacific itinerary.

In 1999, Semester at Sea conducted what was described as the largest sanctioned visit to Cuba by American college students in nearly four decades. That same year, MTV filmed portions of its reality series Road Rules aboard the SS Universe Explorer, following several cast members participating in a Semester at Sea voyage.

During the 1990s, several voyages were affected by accidents. A student died in a 1993 hiking accident, and five students were killed in a bus crash during a field trip in India in 1996.

=== 2000–2009 ===
In 2000, students aboard Semester at Sea met with Cuban leader Fidel Castro during a stop in Havana, where he participated in a nearly five-hour question-and-answer session. Visits to Cuba stopped in 2004, due to new restrictions by the Bush Administration.

On January 26, 2005, the MV Explorer encountered severe storms in the North Pacific. A 50-foot (15 m) rogue wave damaged the bridge windows, prompting a U.S. Coast Guard response; two crew members were injured.

In 2005, Semester at Sea announced that it would move its academic sponsorship from the University of Pittsburgh to the University of Virginia.

Nobel Peace Prize laureate Desmond Tutu made his first full sailing with the program during the Spring 2007 voyage, as the distinguished lecturer in residence. When he sailed again in 2010, he received the Lifetime African Achievement award from the Millennium Excellence Foundation based in Ghana, which the ship visited during the spring voyage.

In 2008, a University of Wisconsin student was killed in a traffic accident during a port stop in Hong Kong.

In 2009, Semester at Sea celebrated its 100th voyage with the fall semester.

During the 2000s, several voyages were altered due to accidents, severe weather, and geopolitical events. In fall 2000, the SS Universe Explorer was damaged in a collision and later rerouted due to security concerns in the Suez region. Following the September 11 attacks in 2001, a voyage was redirected to avoid the Suez Canal.

=== 2010–2019 ===
The Enrichment Voyages program for continuing education participants offered shorter voyages between academic semesters; the final Enrichment Voyage sailed in 2014.

In May 2011, Semester at Sea introduced a 26-day Maymester voyage with a curriculum based around the United Nations' Millennium Development Goals. The program was discontinued after 2012 due to low enrollment.

Throughout the decade, several voyages were altered due to regional health and security concerns, including itinerary changes during the Western African Ebola virus epidemic.

Several student fatalities occurred. During the fall 2010 voyage, a University of California, Santa Barbara student died of what family members described as natural causes while the ship was docked in Ho Chi Minh City, Vietnam. In 2012, a University of Virginia student died in a boating accident in Dominica during an independently organized excursion while participating in the fall voyage. In 2017, a St. Edward's University student died after falling from a pagoda in Myanmar.

=== 2020–present ===
The spring 2020 voyage was significantly altered due to the COVID-19 pandemic. Several planned ports were canceled and students disembarked early in Cape Town following a U.S. State Department travel advisory. Coursework was completed remotely. The fall 2020 voyage was canceled due to the COVID-19 pandemic.

In May 2026, the Institute for Shipboard Education announced that the University of San Diego had been selected as Semester at Sea's next university partner. The first University of San Diego-sponsored voyage is scheduled for fall 2028.

== Academics ==
While the ship is at sea, students attend classes in a number of subjects and disciplines, including humanities courses relevant to one or more of the countries on the itinerary. All students are required to take an interdisciplinary, core global-studies course. Although Colorado State University (CSU) is the program's academic sponsor, Semester at Sea is open to students from any university. Faculty members are drawn from colleges and universities throughout the United States and around the world.

No classes are taught in port, and students can take Semester at Sea-sponsored trips or travel independently in the port country. Before arriving at a port, they are briefed on the culture and customs of the country they are visiting. At pre-port events, guest speakers, including community leaders and American ambassadors, deliver lectures to the students and faculty.

Shipboard life combines classroom instruction with residential and cultural programming. Voyages include pre-port briefings, guest lecturers from upcoming countries on the itinerary, and interdisciplinary coursework tied to upcoming destinations. Students and other passengers also participate in mandatory safety drills and emergency-preparedness procedures during voyages.

Continuing-education passengers, known as Lifelong Learners, also participate in voyages and may audit classes. In September 2026, ISE and CSU's Osher Lifelong Learning Institute announced a founding partnership focused on expanding lifelong-learning opportunities aboard Semester at Sea.

Voyages often include shipboard traditions associated with long ocean crossings, including Neptune Day ceremonies held during equator crossings.

On the ship, Semester at Sea voyages employ librarians, medical staff, counselors, IT specialists, and security personnel in addition to academic instructors, alongside administrative staff located on the campus of the program's academic sponsor.

== Ships ==
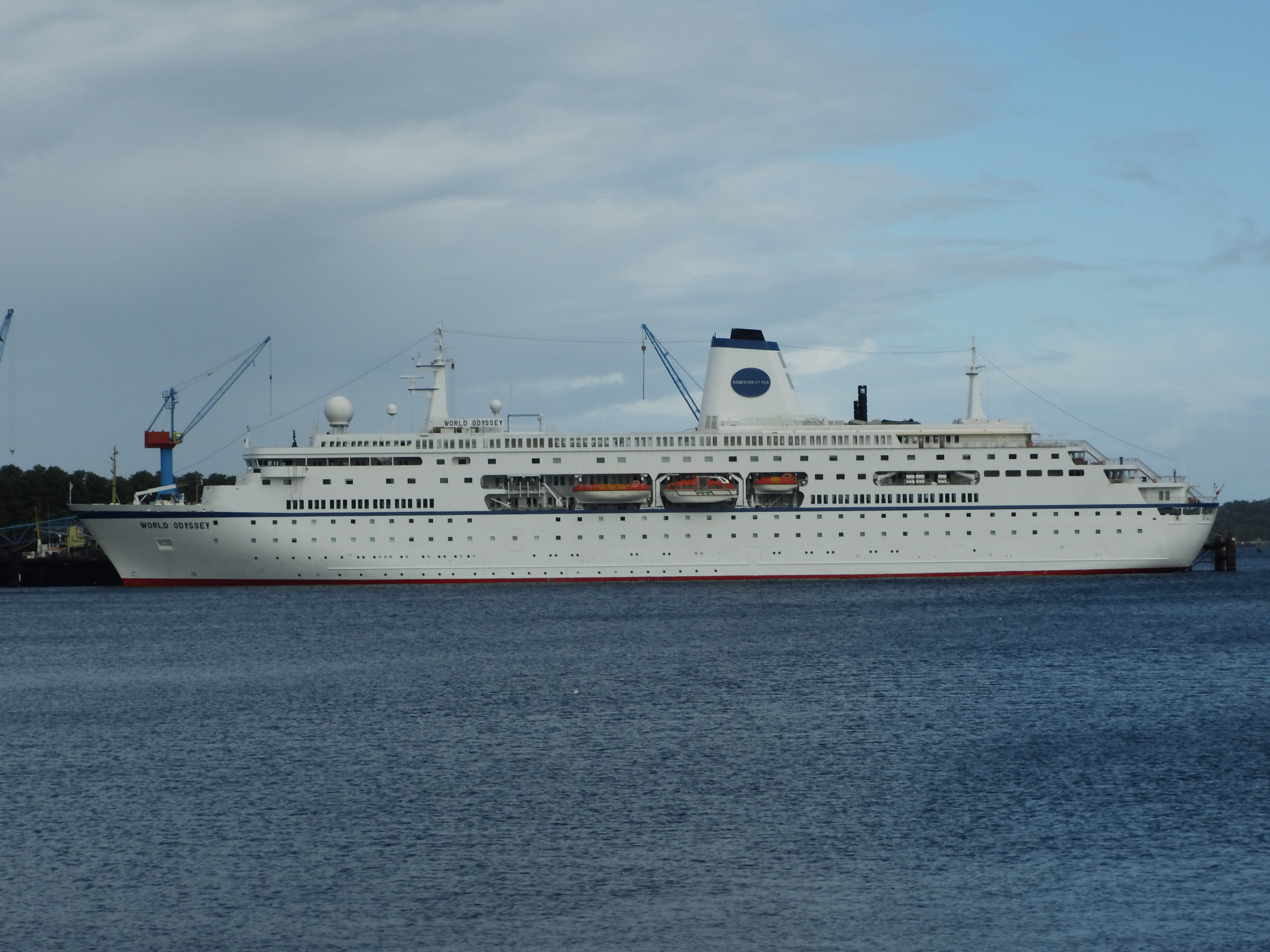
World Odyssey

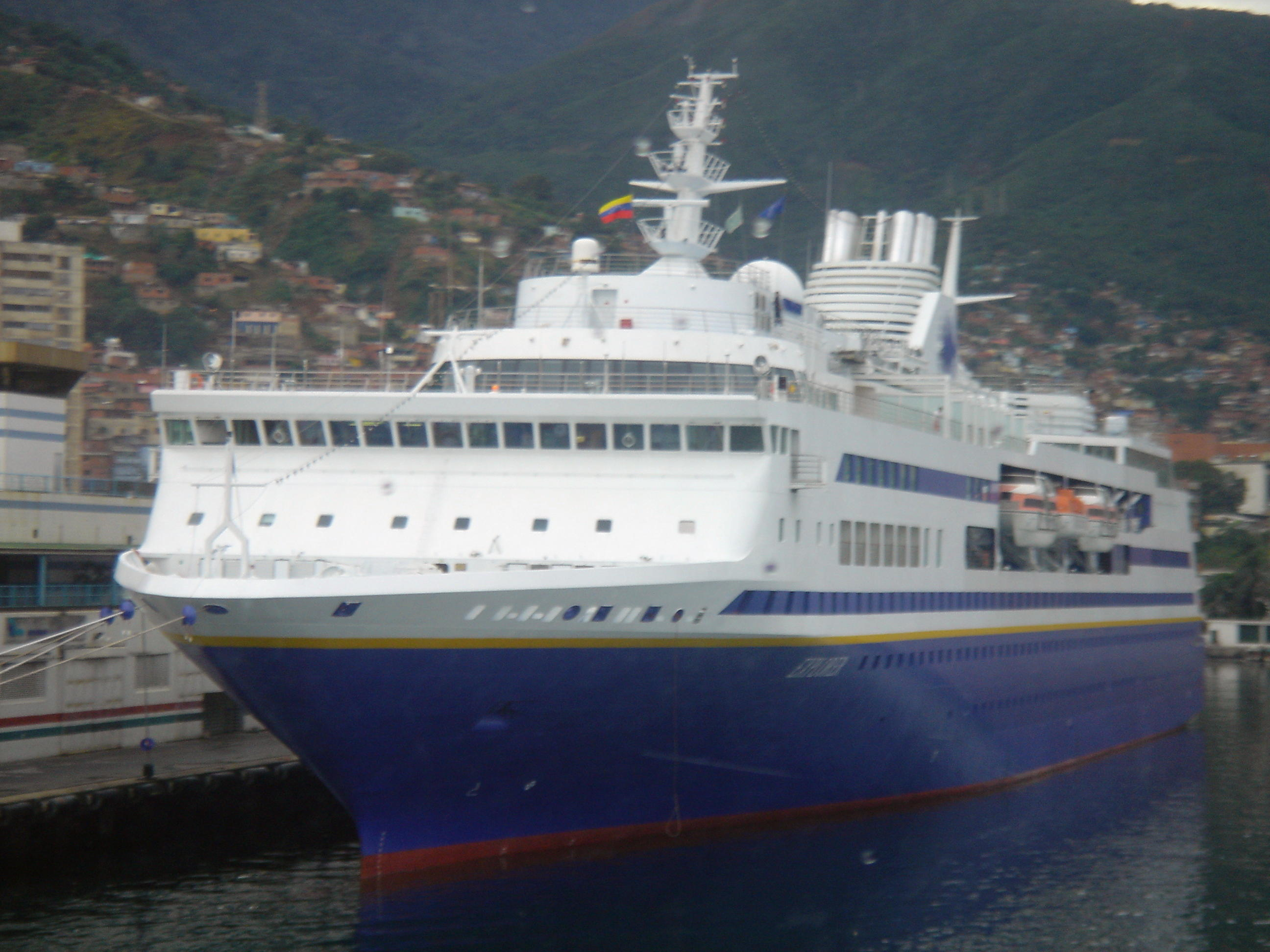
The MV Explorer docked in La Guaira, Venezuela, a port sometimes visited by Semester at Sea

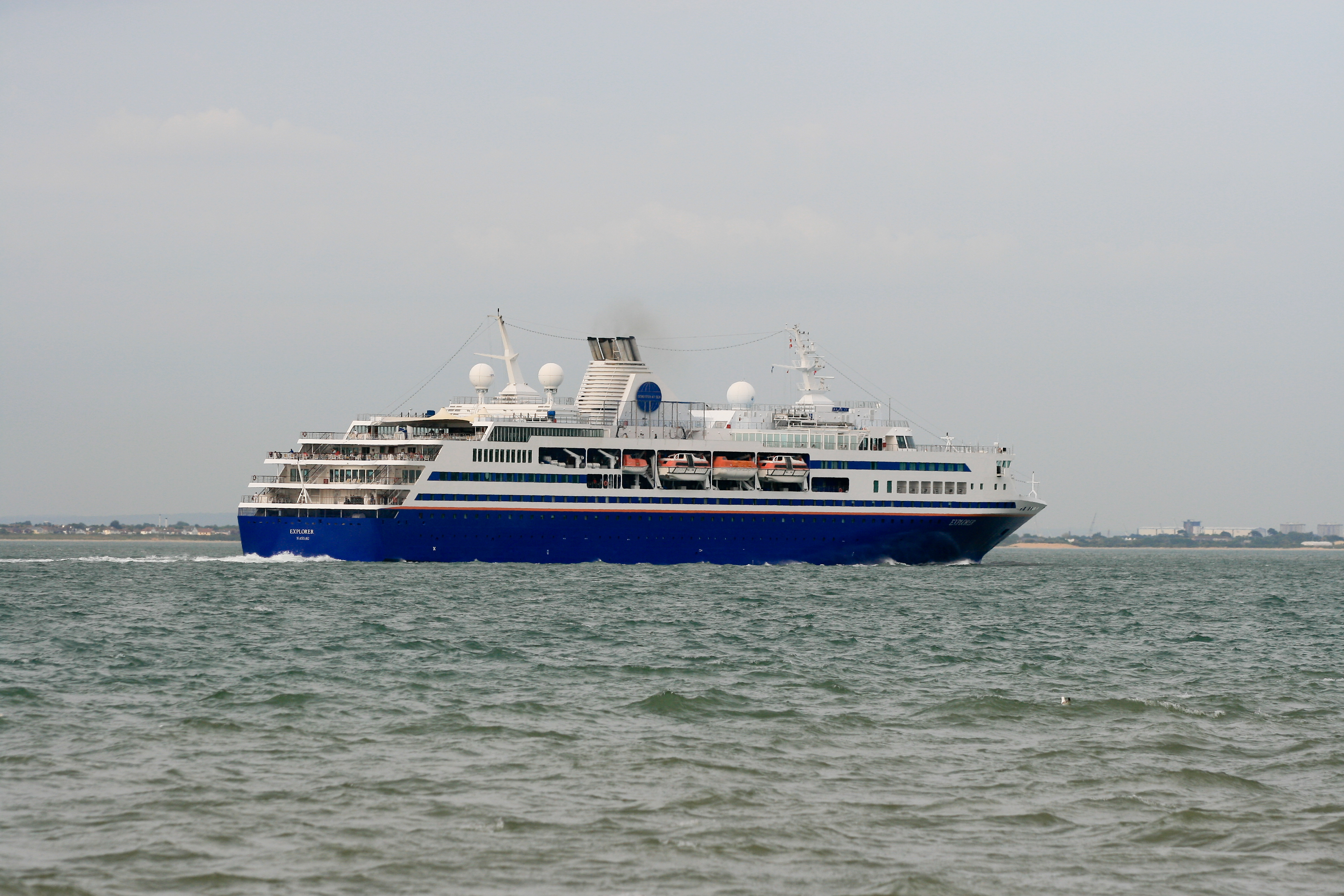
The MV Explorer departing Southampton in June 2013

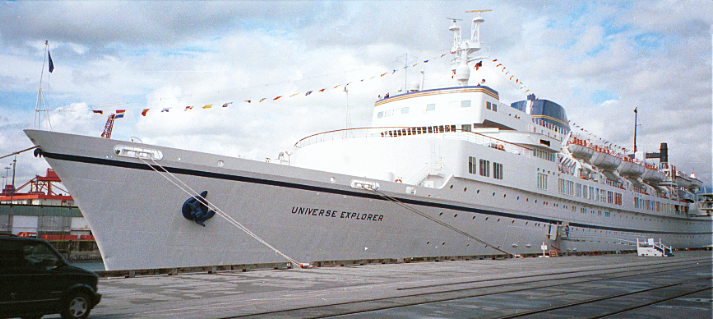
The SS Universe Explorer docked in Vancouver, British Columbia, shortly before embarking on the fall 1997 Semester at Sea voyage

Semester at Sea has used a number of ships as its floating campus, including the MS Seven Seas (the name's similarity to the program's original name was a coincidence), the SS Ryndam (II), the SS Universe, the SS Universe Explorer and the MV Explorer.

Early plans called for the program to use the SS Jerusalem, but the proposal was abandoned because the ship's association with Israel was expected to create difficulties at Arab ports.

In 1966, Holland America Line exchanged the Seven Seas for the new SS Ryndam (II).

The SS Seawise University (formerly the RMS Queen Elizabeth) was purchased by shipping magnate C. Y. Tung for use as a floating campus for the program, but the vessel burned and sank in Hong Kong Harbour in 1972 during conversion work. Following the loss of the ship, Tung acquired the SS Universe as a replacement vessel for the program. At the time, the ship was reported to contain approximately 10,000 library volumes, described as the largest library aboard any ship afloat.

In 1996, the SS Universe Explorer replaced the older SS Universe as the program's vessel.

The Seawise University, Universe, and Universe Explorer were supplied and managed by Tung's Seawise Foundation. In 2005, the University of Pittsburgh ended its sponsorship of Semester at Sea, citing concerns involving governance issues, the relationship between the Institute for Shipboard Education and the Seawise Foundation, and the safety of the MV Explorer. The Institute for Shipboard Education disputed Pitt's characterization of the separation and later filed suit against the university.

A lease was announced in May 2015 for the ship previously known as the MS Deutschland to be renovated, re-flagged and renamed the MV World Odyssey, operated by V-Ships. Semester at Sea will move to new ship in 2028.

On 22 September 2026, Ambassador Cruise Line announced Oceania Cruises's Sirena would join the fleet in 2028 as Ambella ("beloved friend"), which would be used by Semester at Sea during the winter months.

== Ports of call ==
The program itinerary differs each semester, and the ship typically docks at 10 or 11 ports. An early-1990s spring itinerary included Nassau, Caracas, Salvador (Brazil), Cape Town, Mombasa, Chennai, Singapore, Shanghai, Osaka and Hong Kong. More recent voyages have explored Hawaii, Japan, China, Vietnam, Myanmar, India, Mauritius, South Africa, Ghana, Morocco, and the Netherlands. The fall 2019 itinerary included the Netherlands, Poland, the Kiel Canal, Portugal, Spain, Croatia, Morocco, Ghana, Brazil, Trinidad and Tobago, the Panama Canal, Ecuador and Costa Rica. The Summer of 2012 voyage aboard the MV Explorer included Spain, Italy, Croatia, Greece, Turkey, Morocco, and Portugal. Denmark was a port of call in summer 2008, Namibia in fall 2008, Bulgaria in summer 2009 and Senegal in fall 2015 (the program's first visits to those countries).

Semester at Sea had one summer voyage in 1996. The ship left from Ensenada, Mexico and spent two months in the South Pacific, stopping in Papeete, Tahiti; Auckland, New Zealand; Sydney, Australia; Suva, Fiji; Apia, Samoa; and Hilo, Hawaii before ending the voyage in Seattle, Washington.

== Notable people ==
Semester at Sea alumni include television host Joan Lunden, actress Cynthia Nixon, filmmaker Stephen Gaghan, comedian Iliza Shlesinger, Olympic gymnast Kerri Strug, and U.S. representative Kat Cammack. Fashion designer and philanthropist Tory Burch has said that her Semester at Sea experience influenced her later philanthropic work, exposing her to poverty in developing countries and helping inspire the creation of the Tory Burch Foundation.

Faculty members, guest lecturers, and visitors have included Arthur C. Clarke, Fidel Castro, Mikhail Gorbachev, Nelson Mandela, Sandra Day O'Connor, Mother Teresa, and Desmond Tutu.

== See also ==
- List of Semester at Sea people
- The Scholar Ship
