= List of traditional singers =

Singers of folk songs in the oral tradition

A traditional singer, also known as a source singer, is someone who has learned folk songs in the oral tradition, usually from older people within their community.

From around the beginning of the twentieth century, song collectors such as Cecil Sharp went to rural areas to collect traditional songs. Later, Percy Grainger and James Madison Carpenter, followed by Alan Lomax and Peter Kennedy, made field recordings of traditional singers. Many old ballads, including the famous Child Ballads, were found within the oral tradition in the twentieth century.

== List of traditional singers ==
(Arranged by nation and year of birth)

=== England ===
- The Copper Family [Sussex]
- Henry Burstow (1826-1916) [Sussex]
- Joseph Taylor (1833-1910) [Lincolnshire]
- Emma Overd (1838-1928) [Somerset]
- Lucy White (1848-1923) [Somerset]
- Sam Bennett (1865-1951) [Warwickshire]
- George "Pop" Maynard (1872-1962) [Sussex]
- Sam Larner (1878-1965) [Norfolk]
- Cecilia Costello (1884-1976) [West Midlands / Ireland]
- Harry Cox (1885-1971) [Norfolk]
- Bob Roberts (1907-1982) [Dorset]
- Walter Pardon (1914-1996) [Norfolk]
- Fred Jordan (1922-2002) [Shropshire]
- Frank Hinchliffe (1923-1995) [Yorkshire]

=== Scotland ===
- Bell Duncan (1849-1934) [Aberdeenshire]
- John Strachan (1875-1958) [Aberdeenshire]
- Jimmy MacBeath (1894–1972) [Aberdeenshire]
- Belle Stewart (1906-1997) [Perthshire]
- Jeannie Robertson (1908-1975) [Aberdeenshire]
- Duncan Williamson (1928-2007) [Argyll]
- Flora MacNeil (1928-2015) [Outer Hebrides]
- Lizzie Higgins (1929-1993) [Aberdeenshire]
- Kenna Campbell (1937-) [Inner Hebrides]
- Sheila Stewart (1937-2014) [Perthshire]

=== Ireland ===
See traditional Irish singers

=== Wales ===
- Phil Tanner (1862-1950)

=== USA ===
- Wallin Family [Appalachia]
- Jane Hicks Gentry (1863-1925) [Appalachia]
- Bascom Lamar Lunsford (1882-1973) [Appalachia]
- Ollie Gilbert (1892–1980) [Ozarks]
- Clarence Ashley (1895-1967) [Appalachia]
- Horton Barker (1889-1973) [Appalachia]
- Texas Gladden (1895-1966) [Appalachia]
- Nimrod Workman (1895-1994) [Appalachia]
- Almeda Riddle (1898-1986) [Ozarks]
- Dillard Chandler (1907-1992) [Appalachia]
- Frank Proffitt (1913-1965) [Appalachia]
- Jean Ritchie (1922-2015) [Appalachia]
- Sheila Kay Adams (1953- ) [Appalachia]

=== Canada ===
- O. J. Abbott (1872-1962)
- LaRena Clark (1904-1991)

=== Australia ===
- Duke Tritton (1886-1965)
- Sally Sloane (1894-1982)
