= Mary Sands =

American singer

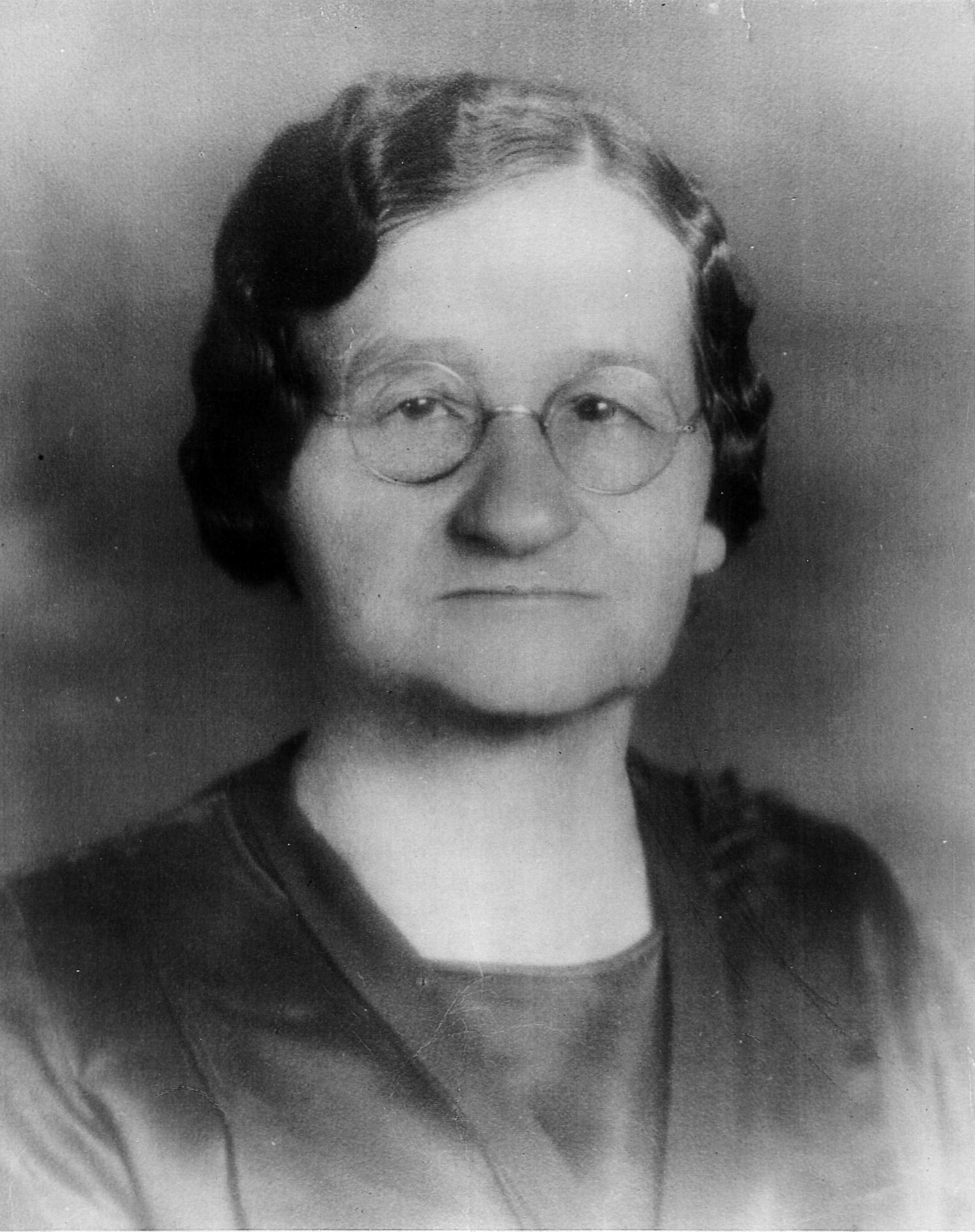
- Mary Sands circa 1920

Background information
- Also known as: Singing Mary
- Born: Mary Bullman; April 8, 1872; Madison County, North Carolina, United States
- Died: April 2, 1949 (aged 76)
- Genres: Folk ballads
- Occupation: Singer

Mary Bullman Sands (April 8, 1872 – April 2, 1949) was an American singer of old traditional ballads during the early part of the 20th century. She was known locally as "Singing Mary" due to her singing talent and extensive knowledge of the words and melodies of many old-time traditional songs that had been passed down through previous generations. In 1916, English folklorist Cecil Sharp, along with his assistant Maud Karpeles, visited Madison County to collect and record traditional folk songs being sung in America that would have originated generations earlier in the British Isles. Sands sang 25 songs for him, 23 of which he included in his book, English Folk Songs from the Southern Appalachians.

== Early life and family ==
Mary Sands née Bullman was born on April 8, 1872, in the Laurel section of Madison County, North Carolina. Her parents were John Wesley Bullman (1847–1895) and Rosannah Shelton (a.k.a. Franklin) (1836–1909). She had a twin sister, Martha Bullman (1872–1897), who died while in her twenties. She also had an older sister, Melvina ("Jane") Bullman (c. 1865 – c. 1930) and an older brother, Christopher Columbus ("Sonny") Bullman (1869–1935). John Wesley Bullman (called "Wesley") was the second husband of Rosannah. Her first husband, Hugh Wallin (1826–1864), was killed in the U.S. Civil War. Rosannah and Hugh Wallin had five sons – Sands's half brothers – some of whom also became well-known traditional ballad singers.

In 1892, Mary Bullman married James Monroe Sands (1849–1923), who had moved to Madison County from Danville, Virginia. Together they had ten children, none of whom are currently living.

== Cecil Sharp ==
When Cecil Sharp came to Madison County in 1916 as part of his project to collect old English ballads, Sands was 44 years old and was eight and a half months pregnant with her tenth child. Of the 39 different Madison County singers that sang for Sharp, Sands provided him the second largest number of songs, 25, with Jane Hicks Gentry of Hot Springs, North Carolina providing him the most, a total of 70, 40 of which were published in his book English Folk Songs from the Southern Appalachians. After Sharp's visit, Sands continued to sing, became very active in her church and wrote a number of unpublished religious songs. She was a lifelong resident of Madison County, except for brief stays with her children during the latter part of her life as her health began to fail.

== Death ==
Sands died April 2, 1949, due to complications following a stroke, just a few days short of her 77th birthday. She was buried in the Walnut Methodist Church Cemetery, Walnut, North Carolina.

== Songs collected by Sharp ==
This list includes dates, titles, and volume and page references to the second and enlarged edition (two volumes-in-one) of Sharp's English Folk Songs from the Southern Appalachians, published in 1932.

(In some cases, Sands referred to her songs by titles different from their more common titles, and parenthetical entries indicate the titles Sharp used in his book.)

July 31, 1916

- The Silk Merchant's Daughter, I, 381
- The Perbadus Lady (Pretty Nancy of Yarmouth), I, 379
- The Brown Girl, I, 295
- Lord Bateman (Young Beichan), I, 81
- Fair Margaret and Sweet William, I, 135
- Come You People Old and Young (The Suffolk Miracle), I, 261

August 1, 1916

- Awake! Awake!, I, 358
- Little Soldier Boy (The Lady and the Dragoon), I, 333
- The Daemon Lover, I, 244
- Earl Brand, I, 16
- I Am a Man of Honour (The Virginian Lover), unpublished
- The Broken Token, II, 70

August 2, 1916

- The Outlandish Knight (Lady Isabel and the Elf Knight), I, 5
- The Golden Glove, I, 377

August 3, 1916

- Lord Lovell, I, 146
- Married and Single Life, II, 3
- My Sad Overthrow (The Sheffield Apprentice), II, 66
- Lord Randal, I, 38

August 4, 1916

- Polly Oliver, I, 344
- I Waited Out My Hours, unpublished
- The Boatsman and the Chest, I, 338
- If You Want to Go A-courting, II, 6

August 5, 1916

- Pretty Saro, II, 10
- Lord Thomas and Fair Ellender (Lord Thomas and Fair Ellinor), I, 121
- My Dearest Dear, II, 13

== Present-day singers ==
The old ballads collected by Sharp from Sands and others over a century ago have not been forgotten. A number of present-day traditional ballad singers have included Sands's songs in their repertoires for live concerts as well as in sound recordings.

Sheila Kay Adams, award-winning singer, musician, story teller, and author, has recorded an album entitled My Dearest Dear, which includes six songs that are part of Sharp's collection from Sands. They are: "Fine Sally" (a.k.a. "The Brown Girl"), "Awake! Awake!," "My Dearest Dear," "Little Soldier Boy," "Silk Merchant's Daughter," and "Jimmy Randall" (a.k.a. "Lord Randall").

Joe Penland, ballad singer and story teller, has recorded several albums that include songs from Sands, with his most recent album, The Mary Sands Project, Volume I, containing eleven of the songs Sands sang for Sharp and one original song written by Sands. They are: "Awake! Awake!," "The Silk Merchants Daughter," "Sweet William (Earl Brand)," "The House Carpenter (The Daemon Lover)," "My Sad Overthrow (The Sheffield Apprentice)," "The Handkerchief (The Suffolk Miracle)," "Lady Marget (Fair Margaret and Sweet William)," "The Boatsman and the Chest," "Lord Thomas and Fair Ellender," "Lady Isabel and the Elf Knight," "Jimmy Randall (Lord Randall)," and "Your Sins Will Find You Out." "Your Sins Will Find You Out" was written by Sands depicting the 1937 shooting death of her son Chesley in Marshall, North Carolina.

Prior to the release of The Mary Sands Project, Volume I, Penland had recorded two other albums that included songs from Sands. They are: Standing on Tradition, which includes "Pretty Saro," and On Shakey Ground, which includes "My Dearest Dear" and "Fine Sally" (a.k.a. "The Brown Girl").

Martin Simpson, English folk singer, guitarist, and songwriter, and Thomm Jutz, German-born American singer, guitarist, and songwriter, have collaborated to record an album entitled Nothing But Green Willow: The Songs of Mary Sands and Jane Gentry. It includes these songs from Sands: "Pretty Saro," "Married and Single Life," "The Suffolk Miracle," and "Awake! Awake!"

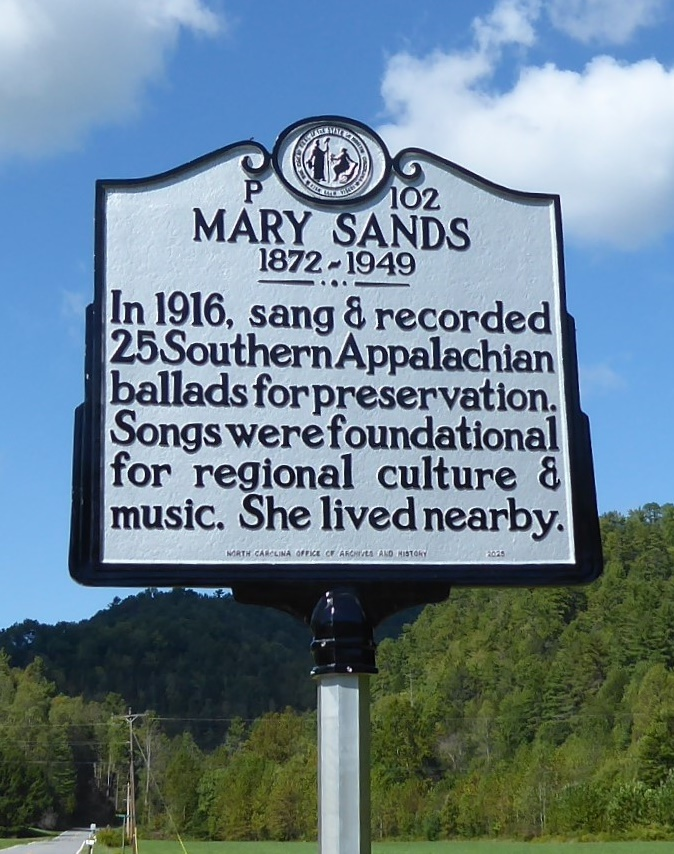
NC highway historical marker for Mary Sands

Other traditional Southern Appalachian ballad singers who have recorded albums containing one or more of Sands's songs include: Donna Ray Norton, Single Girl, Forks in the Road, and Forevermore I'll Sing; Bobby McMillon, A Deeper Feeling; Bill Morris, Blue Ridge Mountain Music, Volume II; Jerry Adams, When I First Come to this Country; Doug and Jack Wallin, Family Songs and Stories from the North Carolina Mountains; and Betty Smith, Songs Traditionally Sung in North Carolina.

== Legacy ==
In 2025, the North Carolina Highway Historical Marker Program honored Sands and her role in the preservation of traditional Southern Appalachian ballads by placing a highway historical marker alongside North Carolina Highway 208 near where she lived when she sang for Sharp.
