= Rob Amberg =

American photographer

Rob Amberg (born 1947 in Washington, D.C.) is a North Carolina photographer, folklorist, and chronicler of a small Madison County mountain community, Revere, North Carolina (also known as Sodom or Sodom Laurel), which he depicted in his long-term photo project Sodom Laurel Album. Amberg anticipated the completion of highway I-26 from Charleston, South Carolina, to the Tennessee Tri-Cities area (Bristol-Kingsport-Johnson City) and, starting in 1994, began photographing, interviewing, and collecting objects to document the cutting of a nine-mile stretch of I-26 through some of North Carolina's most spectacular vistas and some of the world's oldest mountains—a project which contributed to the publication of his book The New Road. His documentary photography is archived in a collection at Duke University Library.

== Biography ==
Amberg was educated in Catholic schools and graduated from the University of Dayton in 1969. While there, he produced a slide-tape presentation which introduced him to photography as a tool for social change. After college, he was granted Conscientious Objector status to the draft and spent two and a half years in Tucson, Arizona, where he taught nursery school as his alternative service. While in Tucson, he produced his "first published photographs – a piece on street preachers in a downtown park – and had his first one-person exhibit at Spectrum Gallery." In 2011, he began working with the American Forest Foundation, documenting the relationship between tree farmers and their land. In 2011, he gave the keynote address at the American Tree Farm Convention. In July 2012, Amberg began serving as a visiting artist at Duke University, working specifically with a Literacy Project for middle-school students in Madison County.

Since moving to the mountains of North Carolina in 1973, Amberg has sought to participate in mountain life as well as documenting it. He lives with his wife, Leslie Stilwell, "on a small farm where they raise gardens and shitake mushrooms, tend an assortment of animals, burn firewood, and drink water from a mountain spring."

=== Documentary series ===
Series in the David M. Rubenstein Rare Book & Manuscript Library at Duke University include: The New Road: I-26 and the Footprints of Progress, 1978–2004; The Sodom Laurel Album, 1975–2001; Vanishing Culture of Agriculture, 1984–1999; Correspondence Series, 1995-2009 and undated; Printed Material Series, 1976-2008 and undated; Subject Files Series, 1987-2002 and undated; Writings and Research Series, 1990s-2008 and undated; and Audio Series, 1997–2001.

==== In the Duke University Archives ====
The summary statement of the Rob Amberg collection at Duke states in part, "The gelatin silver prints and pigmented inkjet color prints in the collection represent three bodies of work: The New Road: I-26 and the Footprints of Progress; The Sodom Laurel Album; and The Vanishing Culture of Agriculture. Amberg focuses primarily on the social life and customs of the rural South, especially in the mountains of his home state of North Carolina. Images range from landscape shots taken before and during construction of an interstate highway in the N.C. mountains, to portraits of individuals and families affected by the changes in rural culture."

=== Awards and honors ===
He has received awards from the John Simon Guggenheim Memorial Foundation, the National Endowment for the Humanities, the North Carolina Humanities Council, the Center for Documentary Studies, and others. In 1998, Rob Amberg and Sam Gray were presented the Lange-Taylor Prize for "I-26: Corridor of Change" about changes wrought by highway construction in a remote part of Appalachia. In 2004, he presented Sodom Laurel Album at the Library of Congress.

== Books with photographs by Amberg ==
He wrote Sodom Laurel Album, which tells the story of the once-isolated North Carolina community Sodom Laurel, a place on the brink of change. It is about the people who live there and the traditional mountain music that binds them together. Doug Wallin, a member of the Wallin Family singers, and Balladsinger and storyteller Sheila Kay Adams are also featured in this book. Sodom Laurel Album was published in 2002 by the Center for Documentary Studies at Duke and the University of North Carolina Press.

In 1994, Amberg began documenting the progress of a new highway, the largest earth moving project in North Carolina history, passing through the most rural and rugged reaches of Madison County. This project became the book, The New Road. This book was published in 2009 by the Center for American Places at Columbia College Chicago.

Quartet is a book compilation of the art of photographers Rob Amberg, Elizabeth Matheson, John Rosenthal, and Caroline Vaughan.

== Exhibitions ==
Rob Amberg's exhibition Sodom Laurel and Sheila Kay Adams' banjo playing, traditional ballad singing, and storytelling were featured at Art6 in 2004, several months after that gallery's transition from Artspace in Richmond, Virginia. In addition, Amberg gave a talk at Art6 along with Virginia photographer Jesse Andrews, who had also extensively photographed a tobacco town, and the two photographers shared their experiences.

SodomSong was an exhibition of photographs by Amberg designed to accompany a countywide part of a National Endowment for the Humanities "suitcase" exhibit titled New Harmonies.

The Z.Smith Reynolds Library at Wake Forest University presented the photographic exhibition Over Home by Amberg and its accompanying documentary film, also called Over Home and produced by Kim Dryden and Joe Cornelius, in the largest exhibition in the library's history. The film follows folk singer Sheila Kay Adams "as she fights to keep her family's traditional ballads alive while struggling to overcome the loss of her husband."
