= Dark Holler: Old Love Songs and Ballads =

Compilation album by Various
- Released: 2005
- Recorded: 1960s
- Genre: Old-time music
- Label: Smithsonian Folkways
- Producer: John Cohen

Dark Holler: Old Love Songs and Ballads is a 2005 compilation album released by Smithsonian Folkways. The album is composed of Appalachian folk music 1960s recordings made and compiled by musicologist John Cohen in Madison County, North Carolina. Most of the songs are done in an a cappella style.

More than half of the songs on the album are sung by Dillard Chandler, a "mysterious" illiterate man who knew hundreds of songs. Allmusic writes that Chandler sings with "deft precision, often with the song's strong sexual undercurrents intact".

The songs contain several dark topics and themes such as murder, revenge, infidelity, and abandoned children. The New York Times describes the album as "traditional songs about love and murder usually traceable to England, a century or more before, but sung in a style rooted in the region: the singers all stretch out, irregularly, on vowels of their choosing, and add upturned yips to the end of stanzas".

Cas Wallin, who sings on two of the album's songs told North Carolinian author Sheila Kay Adams, "They’re studying this for a reason, Sheila, it’s because they don’t think it’s going to last much longer". Despite Wallin's fears, Cohen writes in his liner notes that traditional singing is still alive and well, and a source of pride in rural North Carolina. Allmusic comments, "Hope would appear to be in short supply in these songs, but there is a tenacity of spirit in these old ballads that implies hope in the future by refusing to forget the past."

A bonus DVD of the short documentary film The End of an Old Song is included with the CD packaging. The film features Chandler's hardscrabble lifestyle and is described as "stark and lonesome". No Depression's Barry Mazor noted the film's desolate theme.

Professional ratings
Review scores
Source	Rating
Allmusic	4.0/5 stars

== Track listing ==
Song	Artist
"The Carolina Lady"	Dillard Chandler
"The Soldier Traveling from the North"	Dillard Chandler
"The Sailor Being Tired"	Dillard Chandler
"Young Emily"	Dellie Norton
"Pretty Fair Miss In Her Garden"	Dellie Norton
"When I Wore My Apron Low"	Dellie Norton
"Pretty Saro"	Cas Wallin
"Fine Sally"	Cas Wallin
"Neighbor Girl"	Lee Wallin
"Juba This"	Lee Wallin
"Gathering Flowers"	Dillard Chandler
"Gastony Song"	Dillard Chandler
"Cold Rain and Snow"	Dillard Chandler
"In Zepo Town"	Lisha Shelton
"Don't You Remember"	Lisha Shelton
"Awake, Awake"	Dillard Chandler
"Mathie Grove"	Dillard Chandler
"Scotland Man"	George Landers
"Love Has Brought Me to Despair"	Berzilla Wallin
"Johnny Doyle"	Berzilla Wallin
"Short Time Here, Long Time Gone"	Dillard Chandler
"Drunken Driver"	Dillard Chandler
"Jesus Says So"	Dillard Chandler
"Meeting is Over"	Dillard Chandler
"Little Farmer Boy"	Dillard Chandler
"I Wish My Baby Was Born"	Dillard Chandler
