= Revere, North Carolina =

- Unincorporated community
- Location within North Carolina Location within the United States
- Coordinates: 35°54′09″N 82°42′12″W
- Country: United States
- State: North Carolina
- County: Madison County
- Elevation: 2,182 ft (665 m)
- Time zone: UTC-5 (Eastern (EST))
  - Summer (DST): UTC-4 (EDT)
- ZIP Code: 28753 (Marshall)
- Area code: 828
- GNIS feature ID: 1022227

Revere is an unincorporated community in Madison County, North Carolina, United States. It is also known as Sodom and Sodom Laurel.

== Name origin ==
The community was originally named Sodom. During the Civil War, a Baptist preacher travelling through the area commented on a group of prostitutes and compared it to Sodom in the Bible.

Presbyterian missionaries disliked this name, and officially changed the name to Revere. However, natives of the area continue to use the name Sodom.

== Music ==
Revere is particularly rich in ballad singers, and noted folklorist Cecil Sharp transcribed several "Old World" ballads sung to him in 1916, some by family members of singer Dillard Chandler. In 2001, Rob Amberg published a book Sodom Laurel Album that chronicles the traditions and lifestyle in Revere. Residents and folk singers Dellie Norton, Doug Wallin, and Sheila Kay Adams are featured in the book.
