= Rain and Snow =

American folksong

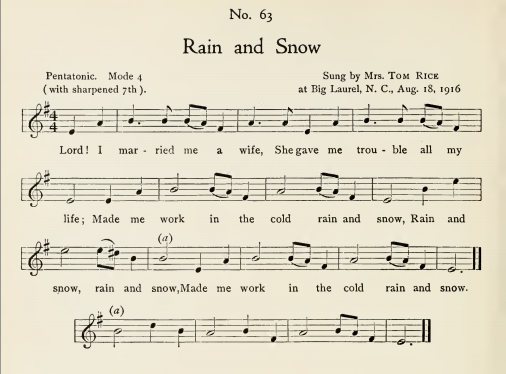
"Rain and Snow" as collected by Olive Dame Campbell and Cecil Sharp, 1917.

"Rain and Snow", also known as "Cold Rain and Snow" (Roud 3634), is an American folksong and in some variants a murder ballad. The song first appeared in print in Olive Dame Campbell and Cecil Sharp's 1917 compilation English Folk Songs from the Southern Appalachians, which relates that it was collected from Mrs. Tom Rice in Big Laurel, North Carolina in 1916.

Campbell and Sharp's version collected only a single verse:

Lord, I married me a wife,
She gave me trouble all my life,
Made me work in the cold rain and snow.
Rain and snow, rain and snow,
Made me work in the cold rain and snow.

== Origin ==
In 1961, folk musicologist Kenneth Goldstein recorded North Carolina banjo player Obray Ramsey singing the song for Ramsey's Prestige International album Obray Ramsey Sings Folksongs From The Three Laurels. In 1965, Dillard Chandler recorded a graphic murder ballad version of the song that ends with the wife being shot by the husband. According to the liner notes on Chandler's album, Chandler learned the song from Berzilla Wallin, who said that the song related to a murder that had occurred in Madison County, North Carolina:

Well, I learned it from an old lady which says she was at the hanging of – which was supposed to be the hanging, but they didn't hang him. They give him 99 long years for the killing of his wife... I heard the song from her in 1911. She was in her 50s at that time. It did happen in her girlhood... when she was a young girl... She lived right here around in Madison County. It happened here between Marshall and Burnsville; that's where they did their hanging at that time – at Burnsville, North Carolina. That's all I know, except they didn't hang the man.'

Subsequent performances have elaborated a variety of additional verses and variants beyond the single verse presented by Campbell and Sharp. Several verses consistently appear. Some sources for lyrics that appear in some later versions may be from Dock Boggs's 1927 song "Sugar Baby" (Roud 5731), another lament of a henpecked husband, which may have contributed a line about "red apple juice". A British folksong, The Sporting Bachelors (Roud 5556), contains similar themes, but was collected in the 1950s. Earlier possible precursors include a series of broadside ballads on the general subject of "Woeful Marriage"; one frequently reprinted nineteenth-century example begins with the words "On Monday night I married a wife", (Roud 1692).

These British antecedents mostly share common themes and inspirations; the song originated in the local tradition of Big Laurel, Madison County, and relate to a nameless murderer who committed the crime at some time between the end of the Civil War and the end of the nineteenth century. A recent origin is also suggested by the relatively limited number of variations on the tune; most performances use the Campbell-Sharp melody as written.

Despite the apparent violence of the lyrics, women feature prominently in the oral tradition of the song. It was collected from "Mrs. Tom Rice", and sung by Berzilla Wallin, who learned it from "an old lady" who remembered the murder trial the song was about.'

== Variants and performances ==
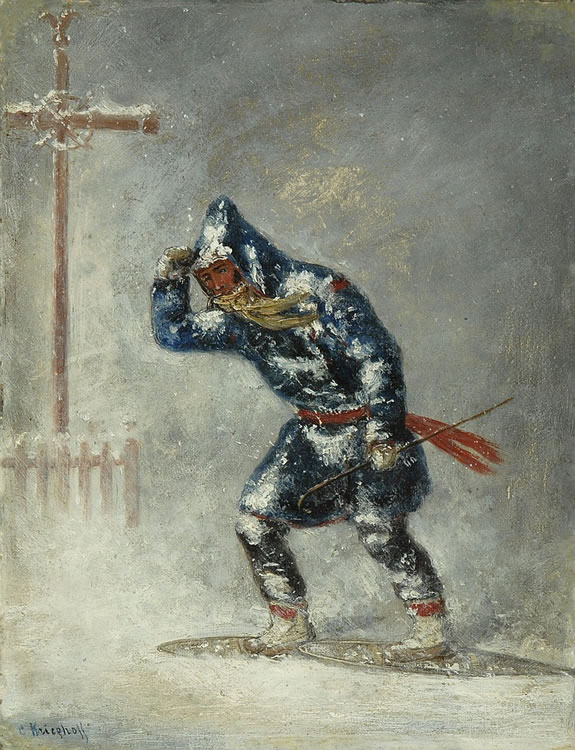
Made me work in the cold rain and snow. Painting by Cornelius Krieghoff.

The song is sometimes associated with the Grateful Dead, who learned it from Obray Ramsey's album. A studio version appeared on their first album The Grateful Dead (1967), and the song was a standard part of the Dead's repertoire throughout their career. They would often open with the song, or perform it early in the first set. Unlike Chandler's recording, in the Dead's version of the lyrics the husband generally laments his mistreatment at his greedy wife's hands, but does not kill her. The lyrics from the Grateful Dead's version were adapted from an earlier recording by Obray Ramsey.

Towards the end of his life, Benjamin Britten orchestrated the one-verse 1917 version of the song; this appears as the first section "Lord I married me a wife" of his Eight Folk Song Arrangements from 1976.

The song's popularity grew out of the old-time tradition, becoming part of the bluegrass music repertoire when it was recorded by Bill Monroe and the Del McCoury Band.

Other performers who have recorded the song include Peter Rowan with Tony Rice (on the Quartet album), Sam Amidon, Pentangle, Molly Tuttle, Rose Laughlin, Betsy Rutherford, the Be Good Tanyas and Sam Wilkes, Craig Weinrib, and Dylan Day.
