= Inside Llewyn Davis (soundtrack) =

Soundtrack album by various artists
- Released: November 12, 2013
- Recorded: Avatar (New York City); Olympic (Los Angeles); The Village (Los Angeles); Sound Emporium (Nashville); House of Blues Studios (Nashville)
- Genre: Folk
- Length: 41:58
- Label: Nonesuch Records
- Producer: T Bone Burnett; Joel and Ethan Coen; Justin Timberlake; Marcus Mumford; Oscar Isaac

Inside Llewyn Davis is the soundtrack of music from the 2013 American film of the same name, written, directed and produced by the Coen brothers and starring Oscar Isaac, Carey Mulligan, John Goodman, Garrett Hedlund and Justin Timberlake.

With the film set in New York City during the 1960s, the soundtrack, produced by T Bone Burnett, uses folk music appropriate to the time period. With the exception of Bob Dylan's "Farewell" and Dave Van Ronk's "Green, Green Rocky Road", the rest of the tracks are modern recordings.

Professional ratings
Aggregate scores
Source	Rating
Metacritic	66/100
Review scores
Source	Rating
Allmusic	3.5/5 stars
The A.V. Club	B+
Consequence of Sound	C−
The Independent	3/5 stars
The Observer	4/5 stars
Popmatters	5/10 stars
Rolling Stone	2.5/5 stars
Under The Radar	8/10 stars

== Track listing ==
No.	Title	Writer(s)	Artist	Length
1.	"Hang Me, Oh Hang Me"	Traditional	Oscar Isaac	3:26
2.	"Fare Thee Well (Dink's Song)"	Traditional	Oscar Isaac and Marcus Mumford	3:00
3.	"The Last Thing On My Mind"	Tom Paxton	Stark Sands with Punch Brothers	3:35
4.	"Five Hundred Miles"	Hedy West	Justin Timberlake, Carey Mulligan and Stark Sands	3:26
5.	"Please Mr. Kennedy"	Ed Rush; George Cromarty; T Bone Burnett; Justin Timberlake; Joel Coen; Ethan Coen	Justin Timberlake, Oscar Isaac and Adam Driver	1:59
6.	"Green, Green Rocky Road"	Len Chandler; Robert Kaufman	Oscar Isaac	3:17
7.	"The Death of Queen Jane"	Dáithí Sproule (music); traditional (lyrics)	Oscar Isaac	3:58
8.	"The Roving Gambler"	Traditional	The Down Hill Strugglers with John Cohen	3:05
9.	"The Shoals of Herring"	Ewan MacColl	Oscar Isaac with Punch Brothers	1:41
10.	"The Auld Triangle"	Dick Shannon	Chris Thile, Chris Eldridge, Marcus Mumford, Justin Timberlake and Gabe Witcher	2:42
11.	"The Storms Are On the Ocean"	A.P. Carter	Nancy Blake	3:16
12.	"Fare Thee Well (Dink's Song)"	Traditional	Oscar Isaac	2:46
13.	"Farewell" (unreleased studio version)	Bob Dylan	Bob Dylan	2:07
14.	"Green, Green Rocky Road"	Len Chandler; Robert Kaufman	Dave Van Ronk	3:45
Total length:				42:00

== Charts ==
Chart (2013)	Peak position
French Albums (SNEP)	84
Belgian Albums (Ultratop Flanders)	41
Belgian Albums (Ultratop Wallonia)	58
Swiss Charts (Hitparade)	61
US Billboard 200	14
US Folk Albums (Billboard)	1
US Rock Albums (Billboard)	13
US Soundtrack Albums (Billboard)	3

=== Year-end charts ===
Chart (2014)	Position
US Billboard 200	183
US Folk Albums (Billboard)	3
US Top Rock Albums (Billboard)	32
US Soundtracks (Billboard)	6

== Release history ==
Region	Date	Format	Label
United States	November 5, 2013	LP	Warner Music Group
United States	November 11, 2013	CD, digital download	Warner Music Group

== See also ==
- Inside Llewyn Davis
- O Brother, Where Art Thou? (soundtrack)
