= The Golden Glove (folk song) =

Song

The Golden Glove (Roud 141, Laws N20) is an English folk song also popular in Scotland, Ireland and North America. It tells the tale of a young woman who falls in love with a farmer and devises a somewhat far-fetched ruse to win his love. This song is also known as Dog and Gun and The Squire of Tamworth.

== Synopsis ==
A squire is engaged to be married to a nobleman's daughter. A farmer is chosen to "give her away" but when she meets him she falls in love with him. She calls off the wedding, Putting on a man's coat, waistcoat and breeches she goes out hunting with "dog and gun" instead.

She oftentimes fired, but nothing she killed,
At length the young farmer came into the field; (lines 17-18)

She asks him why he isn't at the wedding to give the bride away, but he confesses he loves the bride himself. Sometimes at this point the farmer says he would be willing to fight for his love:

"I thought you had been at the wedding" she cried,
"To wait on the Squi-er and give him his bride."
"Oh no," said the farmer, "I'll take sword in hand
And by honour I'll gain her if ever she command."

Pleased to hear this, she gives him a glove "flowered with gold" and tells him she has found it nearby. She goes home and advertises that she has lost her glove and will marry the man who brings it to her. The farmer sees the notice, takes the glove to her and asks her to give him her love.

“It's already granted" the lady replied,
"I love the sweet breath of the farmer,” she cried.
“I'll be mistress of his dairy and the milking of his cow
While my jolly brisk young farmer goes a-whistling to his plough.”

In most of the broadside versions the unfortunate squire comes from Tamworth, in some broadsides and many collected versions he is from some other place, as might be expected.

== History ==
=== Early Printed Versions ===
Timothy Connor, an American prisoner-of-war in Portsmouth, copied the text into his songbook as A New Song sometime between 1777 and 1779. This is the earliest example found so far. It was frequently printed by broadside publishers in all parts of Britain and Ireland from the late eighteenth to the late nineteenth century, and as an example of a popular song with a romantic plot and no sex it was included unaltered in various collections and song-books. In particular Sabine Baring-Gould and Cecil Sharp included it in their "English Folk Songs for Schools" (1906), a reasonably successful attempt to ensure that English school children know at least a few of the more innocuous songs in the English tradition. In the United States the song was published in 1929, 1939, and 1940 in song collections by the Kentucky country singer Bradley Kincaid as well as in many regional collections of folk songs.

=== Field Recordings ===
Many field recordings are available to listen online.

- Irene Carlisle recorded John Pennington singing "Noble Young Squire" in 1952.
- Max Hunter recorded Mrs George Ripley of Milford, Missouri singing With Her Dogs And Guns in 1959.
- Mary Celestia Parler recorded Maxine Hite singing The Dogs and her gun in Prairie Grove, Washington County, Arkansas, in 1959.
- Max Hunter recorded Arkansan Raymond Sanders singing Dog, Gun, and Glove in 1970
- Mike Yates and Ruairidh and Alvina Greig recorded Frank Hinchliffe singing The Golden Glove in 1976. This recording has been re-released on a Musical Traditions CD, "Up in the North, Down in the South".
- Gwilym Davies recorded Danny Brazil singing The Golden Glove in Staverton, Gloucestershire, in 1978.
- Jim Carroll and Pat Mackenzie recorded Martin Howley singing Golden Glove in Fanore, Co. Clare in 1978.

=== Commercial Recordings ===
Kentucky country singer Bradley Kincaid was recorded singing Dog and Gun (An Old English Ballad) in New York in 1933. This recording was included in Harry Smith's Anthology of American Folk Music, Vol. 4. Muckram Wakes, Nic Jones, John Wesley Harding, Shirley Collins, Sally Barker, Fairport Convention, Damien Barber, Hannah James and Sam Sweeney, John Speirs and Jon Boden, Ruth Notman, and Jim Moray have also recorded the song.

== Discussion ==
In their Notes to this song in "Ancient Poems, Ballads and Songs of the Peasantry of England" (1857) James Henry Dixon and Robert Bell write:

This is a very popular ballad, and sung in every part of England. It is traditionally reported to be founded on an incident which occurred in the reign of Elizabeth. It has been published in the broadside form from the commencement of the eighteenth century, but is no doubt much older. It does not appear to have been previously inserted in any collection.

The suggestions that the song is based on a real incident and that it is older than it appears to be have been repeated by other writers.
