= Lord Randall =

Anglo-Scottish traditional song

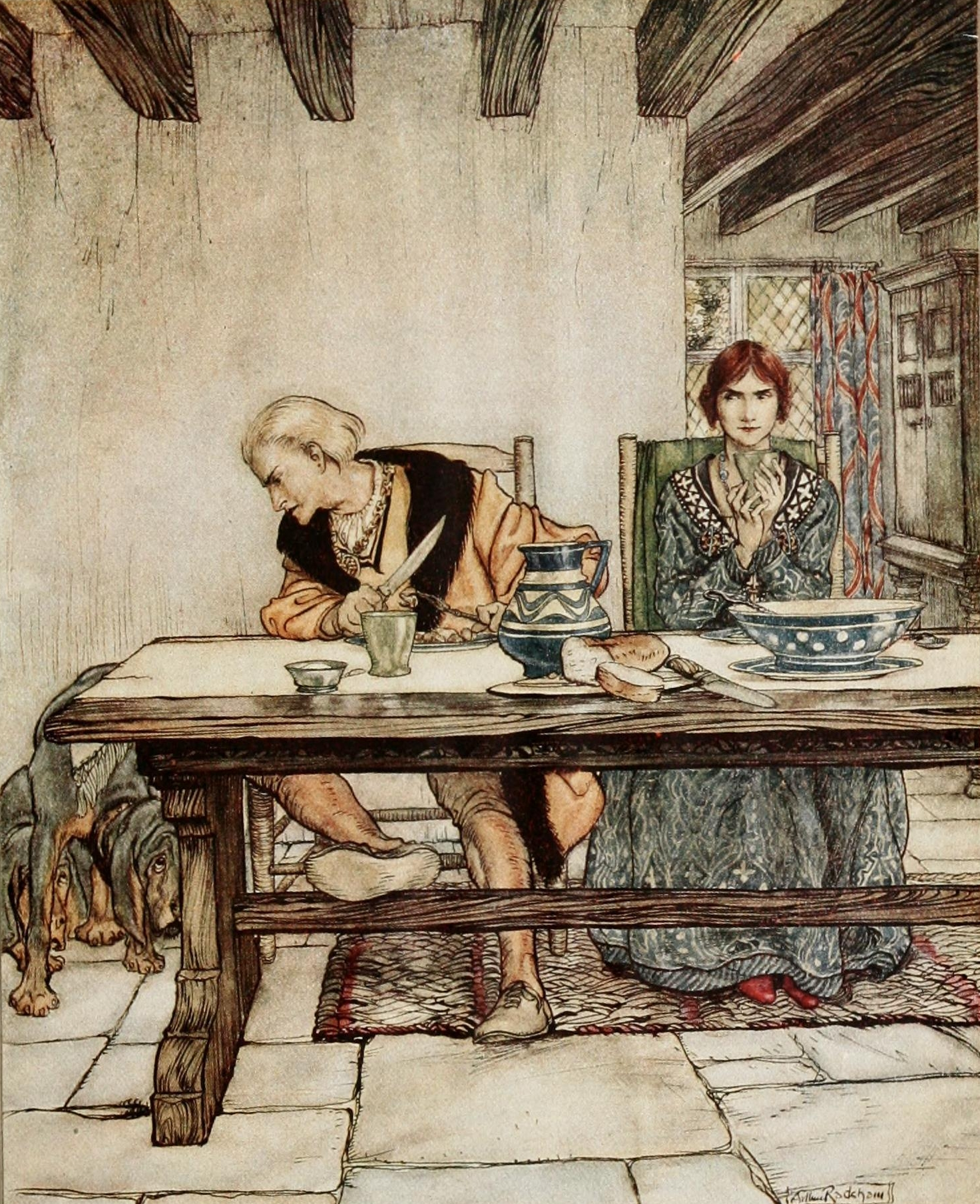
- Illustration by Arthur Rackham in Some British Ballads, ca. 1919

Song
- Written: 17th century (earliest known)
- Genre: Border ballad, folk song
- Songwriter: Unknown

"Lord Randall", or "Lord Randal", (Roud 10, Child 12) is an Anglo-Scottish border ballad consisting of dialogue between a young Lord and his mother. Similar ballads can be found across Europe in many languages, including Danish, German, Magyar, Irish, Swedish, and Wendish. Italian variants are usually titled "L'avvelenato" ("The Poisoned Man") or "Il testamento dell'avvelenato" ("The Poisoned Man's Will"), the earliest known version being a 1629 setting by Camillo il Bianchino, in Verona. Under the title "Croodlin Doo" Robert Chambers published a version in his "Scottish Ballads" (1829) page 324.

== Summary ==
Lord Randall returns home to his mother after visiting his lover. Randall explains that his lover gave him a dinner of eels boiled in "broo" (broth) and that his hunting dogs and hawks died after eating the scraps of the meal, leading his mother to realize that he has been poisoned. In some variants, Randall dictates his last will and testament in readiness for his impending death, dividing his possessions among family members and wishing damnation on his lover. Her motive for poisoning him is never discussed.

== Traditional recordings ==
Many traditional versions of the ballad survived long enough to be recorded by folklorists and ethnomusicologists.

Most traditional English versions are called "Henry, My Son". Dorset traveller Caroline Hughes sang a version to Peter Kennedy in 1968 and another to Ewan MacColl and Peggy Seeger in the early 1960s which can be heard online on the Vaughan Williams Memorial Library website. Fred Jordan of Ludlow, Shropshire also sang "Henry, My Son" to Mike Yates in 1964 and Gwilym Davies in 1994. Louisa Hooper of Somerset, England (sister of the traditional singer Lucy White) was recorded singing a version entitled "Lord Rendal" by the BBC and Douglas Cleverdon in 1942.

James Madison Carpenter recorded many Scottish versions between 1929 and 1935, which can also be heard on the Vaughan Williams Memorial Library website. Russian tenor Vladimir Rosing recorded "Lord Rendal", the Somerset version arranged by Cecil Sharp, on Vocalion A-0167 in the early 1920s. Scottish singer Betsy Miller sang her traditional version with her famous son Ewan MacColl to Alan Lomax in 1953 and on the 1960 album A Garland Of Scots Folksong. Scottish traveller Jeannie Robertson had her version entitled "Lord Donald" recorded by Peter Kennedy in 1953 and again by the BBC in 1963, and her nephew Stanley Robertson was later recorded singing the same version, the audio of which is available on the Tobar an Dualchais website.

The Irish traditional singer Elizabeth Cronin was recorded several times singing a version called Lord Rendal. The Irish sean nós singer Joe Heaney sang an Irish language version titled Amhrán na hEascainne (Song of the Eel).

Several Appalachian musicians recorded the ballad; Jean Ritchie sang the Ritchie family version on the album Jean Ritchie: Ballads from her Appalachian Family Tradition, whilst Frank Proffitt was recorded singing another traditional version in 1961. The ballad was also collected extensively throughout the rest of America.

Modern traditional artists continue to tell the Lord Randall story. Examples include Martin Carthy, Steeleye Span and June Tabor, and Faun included a traditional version on their 2022 album Pagan. Oli Steadman included it on his song collection "365 Days Of Folk".

== Cultural uses ==
Dorothy L. Sayers' 1930 novel Strong Poison uses part of the ballad for a title, and has it as epigraph.

In 1962, Bob Dylan modeled his song "A Hard Rain's A-Gonna Fall" on "Lord Randall", introducing each verse with variants of the introductory lines to each verse of "Lord Randall". Dylan's ballad is often interpreted as a reaction to the Cuban Missile Crisis. Dylan himself disclaimed this as an oversimplification, and in reality, Dylan first publicly performed the song a month before the crisis.

The song features prominently in The Proof of My Innocence, a novel by Jonathan Coe published in 2024.

== See also ==
- List of the Child Ballads
