= Sam Bennett (folk musician) =

English Morris dancer

- Born: 5 November 1865; Ilmington, Warwickshire, England
- Died: 13 February 1951 (aged 85); Ilmington, Warwickshire, England
- Occupation(s): Morris dancer, folk musician, fruit merchant

Sam Bennett (1865–1951) was an English Morris dancer, fiddler and traditional singer from Ilmington, Warwickshire.

He was visited by Cecil Sharp in 1909. Sharp studied the dances of Bennett's Morris dancing troupe, but was critical of some "new" elements of the dances, noting that the older dancers in the village performed one particular dance "exactly as Kimber dances it". He noted down some of Sam's songs including "Thorney Moor Woods" and "Admiral Benbow".

Bennett collaborated with Mary Neal and Clive Carey around 1910, who recorded Ilmington dances in the Esperance Morris Book.

In the 1930s, the American song collector James Madison Carpenter recorded Sam Bennett singing several old ballads, all of which can be heard online courtesy of the Vaughan Williams Memorial Library; these include Lord Bateman, Barbara Allen, Blow Away the Morning Dew, Lord Lovel and Our Goodman.

Peter Kennedy recorded an 85 year old Bennett singing several songs in 1950; the full recording is available via the British Library Sound Archive.

The Ilmington Morris Men credit Sam Bennett with the survival of their local tradition.

I have played more than 100 tunes on the fiddle in an evening and know more than 40 songs, while the country dances I picked up from bands of old fiddlers as they were danced a quarter of a century ago’ (Sam Bennett, Stratford-upon-Avon Herald 18 August 1910).
