= Back Roads to Cold Mountain =

Compilation album by Various
- Released: 2004
- Recorded: 1944–2002
- Genre: Old-time music
- Label: Smithsonian Folkways
- Producer: John Cohen

Professional ratings
Review scores
Source	Rating
Allmusic	4.5/5 stars

Back Roads to Cold Mountain is a 2004 compilation album released by Smithsonian Folkways. The album was released in the wake of the award-winning soundtrack to the film Cold Mountain, and is composed of Appalachian folk music recordings compiled by musicologist John Cohen in Appalachia.

The album was released in 2004, and the material was recorded between 1944 and 2002. The recordings vary from traditional songs recorded by well-known artists, such as Wayfaring Stranger by Bill Monroe, to obscure field recordings. There is also a Sacred Harp track.

Thom Jurek of Allmusic says the album is "one of true Otherness, where dislocation, quark strangeness, and untamed spirits gather in order to whisper, cry, moan, shout and laugh in a language that has not so much died as disappeared" and is "essential listening for anyone interested in authentic American roots music".

Liner notes by Charles Frazier, author of Cold Mountain, and Cohen are included as well.

== Track listing ==
Song	Artist
"Field Holler"	T.J. Chesser
"I Wish My Baby Was Born"	Dillard Chandler
"Look Down That Lonesome Road"	Bill Cornett
"Morning Sun"	Sacred Harp Singers, Stewart's Chapel, Houston, Ms
"Camp Chase"	French Carpenter
"John Brown's Dream"	Dacosta Woltz's Southern Broadcasters
"Bright Sunny South"	Dock Boggs
"The Battle of Stone River"	Oscar Parks
"Sweet Glories Rush Upon My Sight"	Old Regular Baptists, Defeated Creek Church, Linefork, Ky
"Roustabout"	Dink Roberts
"Fox Race"	Joe Patterson
"Jim and John"	Ed, Lonnie, And G.D. Young
"The Day is Past and Gone"	Dorothy Melton
"Omie Wise"	Roscoe Holcomb
"The Silk Merchant's Daughter"	Dellie Norton
"Hicks Farewell"	Dillard Chandler
"Three Little Babes"	Texas Gladden
"Wayfaring Stranger"	Bill Monroe
"Rank Stranger"	The Stanley Brothers
"Christmas Time Will Soon Be Over"	Fiddlin' John Carson
"Am I Am Born to Die"	Doc Watson and Gaither Carlton
"Pullin' the Skiff"	Ora Dell Graham
"Pumpkin Pie"	Joe and Odell Thompson
"Give the Fiddler a Dram"	Dillard Chandler
"The Carolina Lady"	James Crase
"Angel Band"	E.C. and Orna Ball
"The Old Man Below"	Gaither Carlton
"When Sorrows Encompass Me 'Round"	Tommy Jarrell and Fred Cockerham
