= Emma Overd =

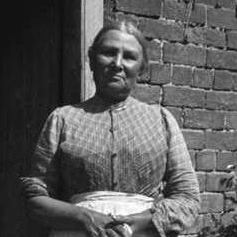
- by Cecil Sharp
- Born: Emma Weaver; October 10, 1838; Langport, Somerset
- Died: June 21, 1928 (aged 89); Langport, Somerset
- Occupation: Agricultural labourer
- Known for: Source of folk songs
- Spouse: William Overd
- Children: Nine

Emma Overd (née Weaver; 10 October 1838 – 21 June 1928) was an English folk-singer from Somerset.

== Life ==
Overd was born in Langport, Somerset in 1838. Her parents were Charles and Elizabeth (née Tuttiett) Weaver. She was brought up by her father's mother as her own mother died when she was young. She worked in agriculture from a child including stripping willow saplings. The wood could be used for basket work.

She was a keen singer who would entertain drinkers with local songs. She came to the notice of Cecil Sharp in 1904 who heard of her skill at folk singing. Sharp had already met local singers Lucy White and Louie Hooper. Sharp was Principal of the Hampstead Conservatoire of Music. Overd met Cecil Sharp and is reputed to have said Lor, girls, here's my beau come at last! in reply to his interest. Sharp enthused about her singing and transcribed many of her songs.

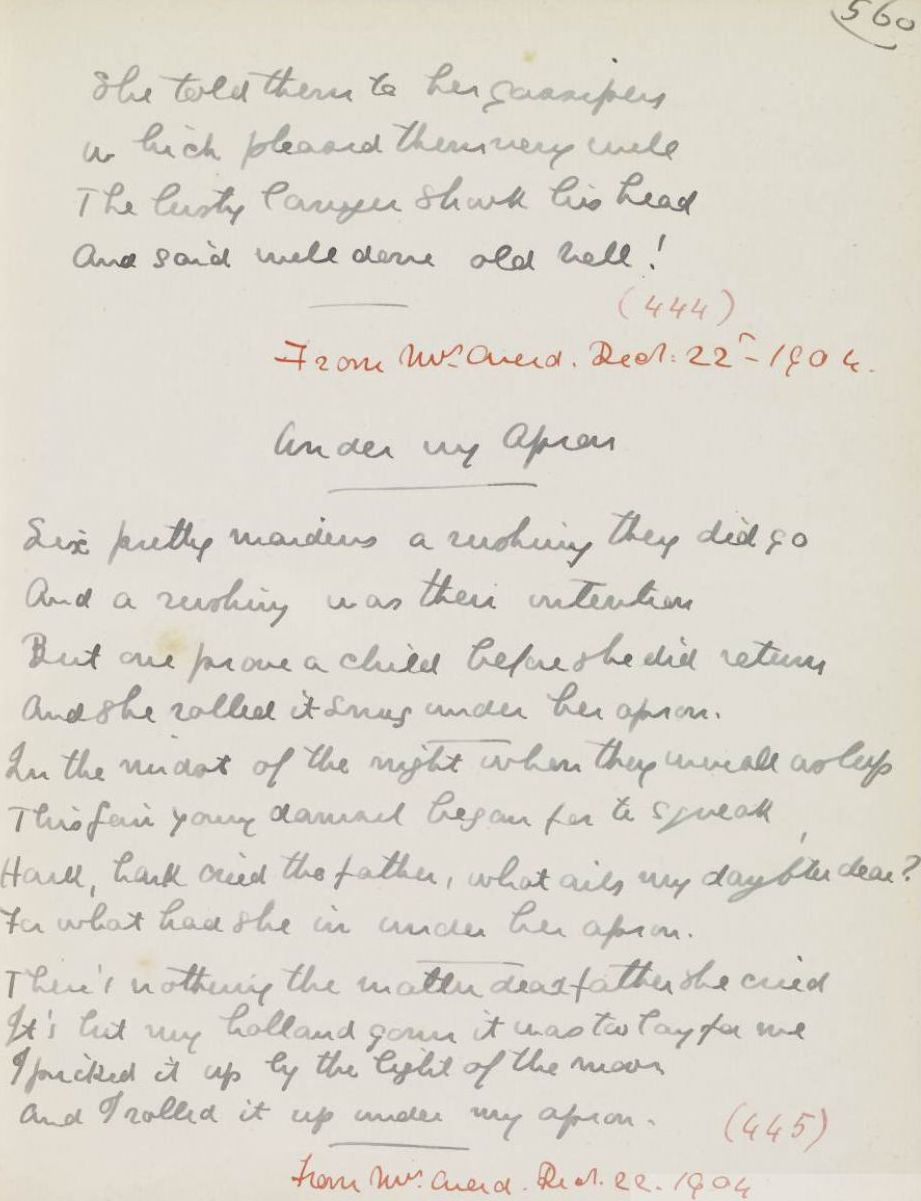
"Six Pretty Maidens" in 1904 from Emma Overd transcribed by Cecil Sharp

Sharp's income was derived after 1905 largely from lecturing and publishing folk music. Overd's songs Bruton Town, Wraggle-Taggle Gipsies, Sweet Kitty and Geordie were included in the first volume of Sharp's and Marson's Folk Songs from Somerset which was published in 1905. Her songs The Crabfish, Briery Bush and New Year's Song were in his later volumes. Sharpand Overd met five times over the next eleven years and Overd introduced him to other folk singers she knew.

After 1909 she was given an old age pension which allowed her to buy a beer each week at Langport's Railway Hotel where she would frequently sing.

== Private life ==
She married William Overd on 25 February 1860 and they had nine children although three did not survive childhood. They lived around Langport. William died in 1914. Overd died a widow in Langport in 1928 and she was buried in Curry Rivel but the precise location is unknown.
