= The Down Hill Strugglers =

American band

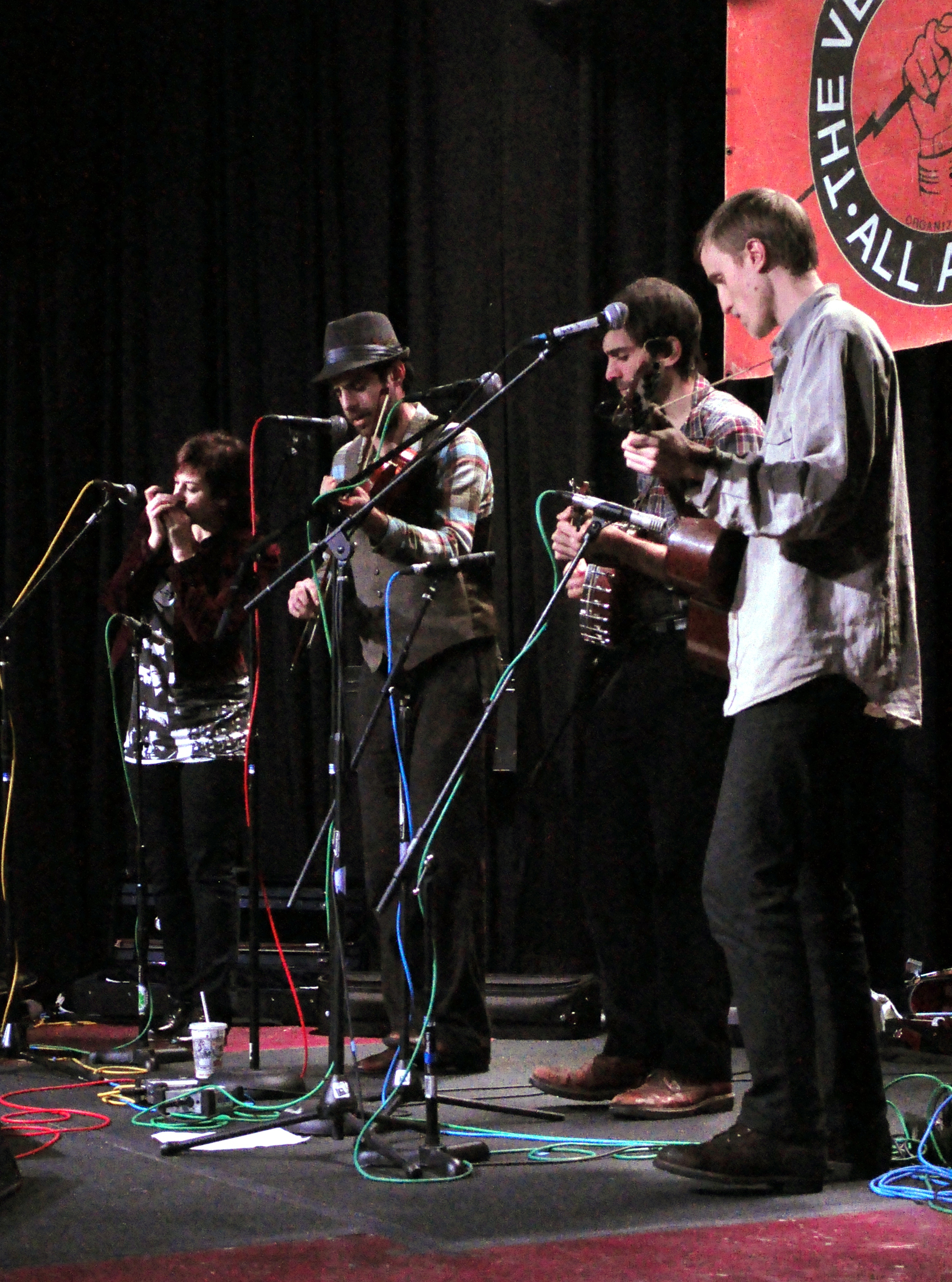

Background information
- Origin: Brooklyn, New York
- Genres: Old-time, folk
- Years active: 2008–present
- Labels: Smithsonian Folkways Jalopy Records
- Members: Eli Smith; Walker Shepard; Jackson Lynch
- Website: Downhillstrugglers.com

The Down Hill Strugglers, previously known as the Dust Busters, is an American old-time string band trio from Brooklyn, New York. Formed in 2008, the band has been influenced by the music of rural America, including Appalachian traditions, music from the Deep South, and the Western States. The band was originally made up of Craig Judelman, Eli Smith, and Walker Shepard. In 2012, Craig Judelman left the Dust Busters and was replaced by multi-instrumentalist Jackson Lynch. At the same time, the band changed its name to the Down Hill Strugglers.

== About ==
Eli Smith and Walker Shepard met while at the home of Peter Stampfel of The Holy Modal Rounders, where they also met John Cohen of The New Lost City Ramblers. They met fiddler and multi-instrumentalist Jackson Lynch at the folk music club, the Jalopy Theatre in Brooklyn, NY.

Smith has produced his own podcast and blog called "Down Home Radio" which is dedicated to the sounds of folk music. He has also founded two festivals to promote old-time music in New York City: The Brooklyn Folk Festival and The Washington Square Park Folk Festival.

== Style and influence ==
Their style of music is influenced by rural old-time traditions of Appalachia, the Deep South, and the Western States. The band is also influenced by the folk musicians who have played before them, and they aim to introduce the folk style of music to a younger generation. They have met with individuals such as banjo player Pat Conte, Alice Gerrard, Clyde Davenport, and the late fiddler Joe Thompson.

== Career ==
Over the course of their career, they have toured across the United States and Europe and have appeared at numerous festivals that encourage the preservation of folk life and music. In 2010, they received a special invitation from the US Embassy in Sofia to represent American folk music at the Bourgas International Folklore Festival and to also be showcased at the Apollonia Festival of the Arts in Sozopol. They have also performed at film festivals such as the Woodstock Film Festival alongside John Cohen while he was screening his documentary, Roscoe Holcomb: From Daisy Kentucky. In 2010, they played at the Dock Boggs festival in Norton, Virginia, and were asked for a repeat performance at the 2011 festival.

They have been featured on radio shows such as WoodSongs Old-Time Radio Hour and are still archived on the WoodSongs website for listening. The band also has been featured on KEXP 90.3 FM Radio alongside John Cohen.

== Members ==
- Walker Shepard: vocals, guitar, banjo, bantar, fiddle
- Jackson Lynch: vocals, fiddle, guitar
- Eli Smith: vocals, guitar, banjo, manjo, bantar, harmonica, autoharp

== Discography ==
- The Dust Busters (2009)
- Prohibition is a Failure (2010)
- Old Man Below (2012, Smithsonian Folkways)
- Inside Llewyn Davis (Soundtrack album, 2013, Nonesuch)
- Home Recordings Vol. 1 (2013)
- Show Me The Way to Go Home (2014)
- Lone Prairie (2017, Jalopy Records)
- Old Juniper (2024, Jalopy Records)

== Awards ==
- Independent Music Awards 2013: Old Man Below - Best Bluegrass Album
