= Cecilia Costello =

British singer

- Born: 24 October 1884; Birmingham
- Died: 20 April 1976 (aged 91)
- Occupation: singer
- Known for: folk somgs

Cecilia Costello (née Kelly, 24 October 1884 – 20 April 1976) was an English traditional singer whose repertoire of folk songs was recorded by folk music scholars in the 1950s and 1960s.

Born near the Bull Ring in Birmingham, she was the youngest of 10 children of parents who left Ireland to escape famine. She is first recorded making screws in Digbeth, and later as a brass polisher in the Birmingham Workhouse Infirmary in Winson Green in 1901. She married Thomas Costello in 1904 and they had 8 children.

Costello was visited twice – in 1951 and 1954 – by folk music researcher Marie Slocombe of the BBC Sound Archive, who recorded 13 songs of hers. Charles Parker visited her in 1967 and recorded a series of interviews. These were combined on a record released in 1975.

The recorded songs of Cecilia Costello largely reflect urban life. She is notable for performing songs from the Irish tradition in a musical and linguistic dialect that identifiably belongs in the English West Midlands, illustrating how immigrant cultures were quickly assimilated within the local musical tradition. A later commentator analysed her work: "To listen to that warm Brummie voice in the excerpts from Charles Parker's interviews ... you wouldn't dream that this old lady was only a generation away from rural Ireland."
