= Doug Wallin =

American musician and ballad singer

Martin Douglas Wallin (July 30, 1919 – March 15, 2000) was a ballad singer and fiddler born in Madison County, North Carolina, and a recipient of a 1989 North Carolina Heritage Award.

== Biography ==
A member of the Wallin Family, Wallin's parents, father Lee and mother Berzilla, were singers; Lee also played the fiddle and banjo and Doug's younger brother Jack plays banjo, fiddle, and guitar. His song selection and style respectfully reflected the Wallins' long family heritage. His singing was unusually refined, characteristically rendered with subtlety, precision, and a silent passion. His extensive repertoire was made up of centuries-old ballads and songs, many of which were of British ancestry, which he learned from members of his family and the mountain community he grew up in; he particularly favored love ballads, which he sang without instrumental accompaniment. Wallin often played the tune of a ballad on the fiddle before singing the words, or added a fiddled refrain between verses. Like his singing, his fiddling was straightforward and traditional, emphasizing the simple beauty of each song's melody.

He performed at several music festivals, including the Mountain Heritage Festival at Cullowhee, North Carolina, the Bascom Lamar Lunsford Festival at Mars Hill, North Carolina, the Celebration of Traditional Music at Berea, Kentucky, and the British American Festival.

In 1990, Wallin received a Heritage Fellowship from the National Endowment for the Arts, which is the United States government's highest honor in the folk and traditional arts. He was also a 1989 recipient of a North Carolina Heritage Award for his loving preservation of traditional music. Although performances by Doug appeared on the Folkways album Dillard Chandler: The End of an Old Song and on a couple of privately released cassettes, his music did not become widely known until the 1995 release of Smithsonian-Folkways' Family Songs and Stories from the North Carolina Mountains, a CD of field recordings which also features Doug's brother Jack on three tracks.

Doug Wallin died on March 15, 2000, at 80 years old.
