= Dorette Wilkie =

- Born: Dorette Wilke; 14 June 1867; Magdeburg, Prussia
- Died: 19 January 1930 (aged 62); Headley, Hampshire
- Known for: headteacher of the Chelsea College of Physical Education

Dorette Wilkie born Dorette Wilke (14 June 1867 – 19 January 1930) was a Prussian-born British promoter of women's physical education. She founded the Chelsea College of Physical Education which is now part of the University of Brighton.

== Life ==
Wilkie was born in Magdeburg in Prussia in 1867. She came to Britain as a teenager suffering from a curved spine. She enrolled on a physical education course which not only fixed her spinal problem but made her into an exemplar and advocate for physical education. She was able to obtain two years of training in gymnastics at Adolf A. Stempel's facility which she received in exchange for a year of teaching.

In 1898 she became the headteacher of the Chelsea College of Physical Education which started in September training women gymnastic teachers. The college which she founded was part of the South Western Polytechnic in Chelsea.

Starting in 1907 she set up a partnership with Cecil Sharp who also taught Morris Dancing there in association with the college. He was known for his interest in English folk songs and dances and he taught her students Morris dancing.

On 1 May 1908, she became a British citizen which she marked by changing the spelling of her last name from Wilke to Wilkie.

In 1910 Wilkie and Cecil Sharp were both at Japan–British Exhibition on 9 July 1910 in London where the students demonstrated their dances. Sharp accompanied them on the piano and Wilkie spoke about the importance of 20 minutes of exercise each day. The following month they undertook a similar exhibition in Paris at the International Congress of School Hygiene.

Sharp asked her to serve on the English Folk Dance and Song Society committee at the end of 1911 and she arranged for her students to try out his new dances. Her second year students would go on tours where they would demonstrate English folk dancing. Her students were all women and they were all referred to by their second names.

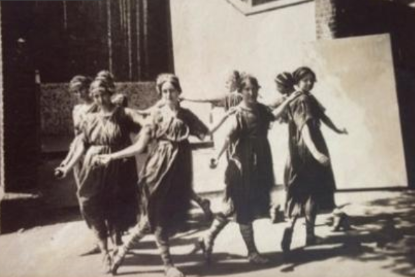
Dorette Wilkie's students dancing in 1915

Wilkie retired in 1929 and she was replaced by May Fountain who had been on the staff since 1912. Wilkie moved from Chelsea to a cottage in Headley. She died there the following year from breast cancer. In 1947 her college was taken over by Eastbourne Education Authority who moved it to Eastbourne. The college is merged into Brighton University.
