= Lucy White =

English folk-singer (1848–1923)

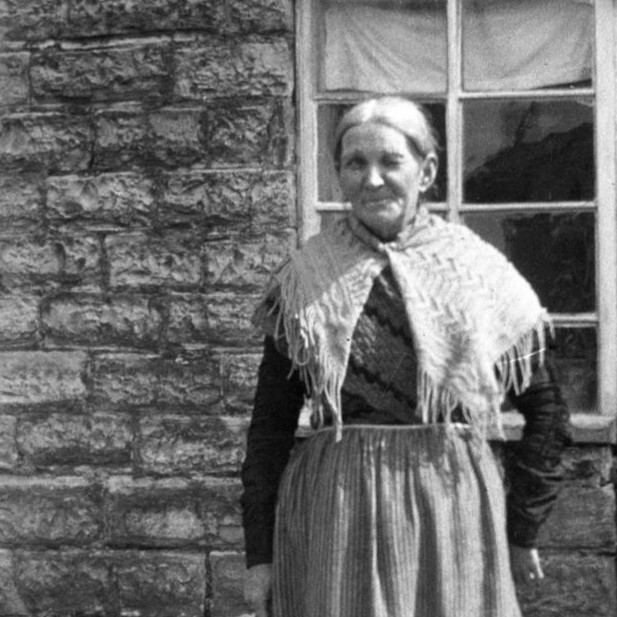
- Lucy White by Cecil Sharp c. 1905
- Born: Lucy Bridge; 4 September 1848; Puckington
- Died: 17 February 1923 (aged 74); Hambridge and Westport
- Known for: knowledge of folk songs
- Spouse: Jonathon White
- Children: eight

Lucy Anna White (4 September 1848 – 17 February 1923) was a British folk-singer from Somerset. She was an early source of songs for the folk song collector Cecil Sharp and she is said to have shaped his interests. Her half-sister was another singer named Louie Hooper (1860-1946) (born Louisa England).

== Life ==
White was born in Puckington in Somerset in 1848. Her mother was Sarah Bridge who taught her many songs. When she was about thirteen her mother married William England in 1855. She grew up in a family of six children including her half-sister Louie was born in 1860. She sometimes used the name Lucy England. Louie was unable to walk but they both worked with others involved in glove and shirt-making. White was working on collars at the age of ten.

She married Jonathon White in 1875 and Louie married George Hooper in 1884. Between 1875 and 1884 she had eight children although two were illegitimate. Louie had three children after her marriage to George Hooper even though he had died soon after they married. In the 1890s Louie and Lucy were living next door to each other in Westport.

She came to notice because Charles Marson came as the vicar to her village. He was a socialist, an enthusiast for his parishioners and a bane to the church authorities. His friend Cecil Sharp was a music teacher as he was Principal of the Hampstead Conservatoire of Music. In 1903 Sharp came to visit Marson in Somerset and Sharp started to collect songs.

Other local singers like Emma Overd came to the notice of Sharp in 1904. Sharp's income was derived after 1905 largely from lecturing and publishing folk music.

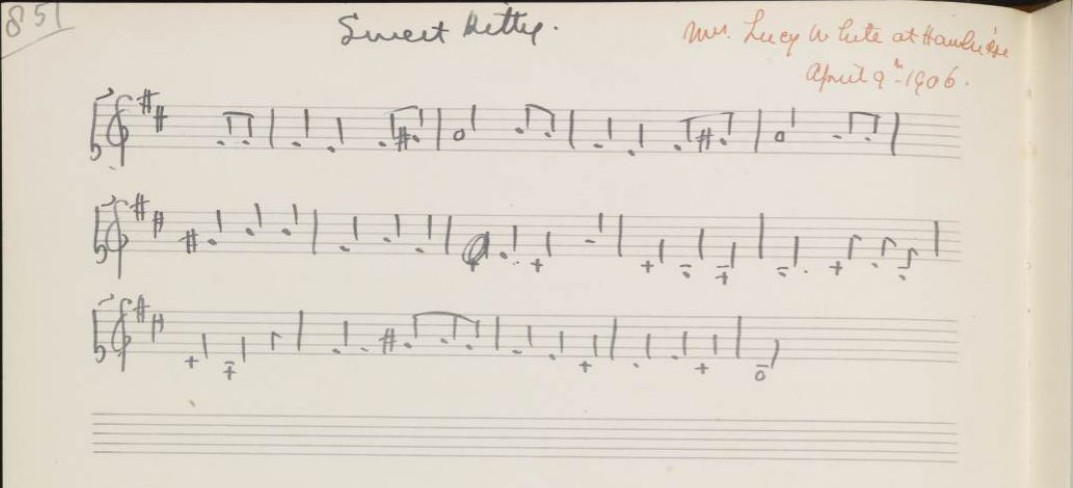
"Sweet Kitty" transcribed from Lucy White by Cecil Sharp in 1906

Sharp's books began to be published in 1905 and it included 19 of the songs that Lucy and Louie had taught him and one of the tunes. They had sung 33 tunes to Sharp including 27 sung just by Hooper. Sharp had visited them over twenty times. They were both credited in Sharp's books. After they were published Sharp gave a copy of the books to them with the dedication that "exchange is no robbery". Their songs Seventeen Come Sunday, Henry Martin, Sweet Kitty and The Sign of the Bonny Blue Bell were among those chosen as "Folk Songs from Somerset".

White died in Hambridge and Westport in 1923. She was survived by her half sister Louie, who was recorded singing by the BBC in 1942.
