= Frank Hinchliffe =

English folk singer (1923–1995)

- Born: 1923; Fulwood, Sheffield, West Yorkshire
- Died: 15 March 1995 (aged 71)
- Occupations: Farmer, folk singer

Frank Hinchliffe (1923 – 15 March 1995) was an English folk singer and farmer. The folklorist Ian Russell described him as one of the finest traditional English singers "heard since the advent of sound recording."

He was born in either Fulwood, Sheffield or Holme, West Yorkshire, to Mary and Bill Hinchliffe, and grew up on Clough Fields Farm in nearby Crosspool. He worked on the farm he had grown up on then at 18 worked for the Water Board working at the local reservoirs, although he continued to farm for much of his life. Hinchliffe's repertoire consisted of around 140 songs and local carols, included the Child Ballads "Barbara Allen" and "Edward", all of which came from his parents, father-in-law, and other older local singers.

A 1973 interview with Hinchliffe is available in the Reg Hall Collection via the British Library Sound Archive. In 1976 he was recorded by Mike Yates and Ruairidh and Alvina Greig. In 1977 his album In Sheffield Park was released. Ian Russell described him as one of the finest traditional English singers "heard since the advent of sound recording." Hinchcliffe performed at the National Folk Festival at Sutton Bonington in 1978, 1987, and 1990.

In 1982, he retired from work as a result of rheumatoid arthritis, which he struggled with for the rest of his life. He died in 1995 aged 71 from an undiagnosed cancer.

== Discography ==
- In Sheffield Park: Traditional Songs from South Yorkshire (1977)
