= Wallin Family =

American family of traditional ballad singers

The Wallin Family is an American family of traditional ballad singers from Madison County, North Carolina. Their repertoire of Appalachian folk ballads— many of which were rooted in "Old World" ballads traceable to the British Isles (such as the Child Ballads) — brought them to the attention of folk music enthusiasts during the American folk music revival of the 1960s. Wallin family members have recorded numerous times over a period of nearly four decades, and have appeared in several independent documentaries.

== Family members and lineage ==
Members of the Wallin family are either descendants of or married to descendants of Hugh Wallin (1829—1864), a Union Army recruiter assassinated by Confederate soldiers during the U.S. Civil War. Among the children of Hugh and his wife, Rosannah, were sons Mitchell Wallin (1854—1932) and Thomas Jefferson "Tom" Wallin (1857—1948). After Hugh's death, Rosannah married John Bullman, and their children included daughter Mary Bullman Sands (1872—1949). Children of Thomas Jefferson Wallin included Robert Lee Wallin (1889—1973), Chappel Wallin (1898—1984), Jeter Wallin (1899—1985) and Cas Wallin (1903—1992). Robert Lee (usually listed as simply "Lee Wallin"; 1889–1973) and his wife Berzilla (née Chandler; 1892–1986) had more than 10 children, including Martin Douglas "Doug" Wallin (30 July 1919—15 March 2000) and Jack Wallin (7 May 1932—3 January 2005). Berzilla was the sister of ballad singers Lloyd Chandler and Dellie Chandler Norton, and a cousin of Dillard Chandler.

== Cecil Sharp visit ==
In the latter years of World War I, British folklorist Cecil Sharp and his assistant Maud Karpeles traveled extensively across Central and Southern Appalachia in hopes of finding British ballads that had been passed down to the inhabitants of the more remote parts of the region from their British ancestors. One of the first places they visited was Madison County, where they arrived in late July 1916. Sharp met Mary Sands on July 31, and over the next few days collected 25 ballads from her, including "The Silkmerchant's Daughter," "Earl Brand," "The Daemon Lover," and "Sheffield Apprentice." On August 4, Sharp met Sands's half-brother, Mitchell Wallin, who gave Sharp ballads such as "Betsy" and "Early, Early in the Spring" and the fiddle tune "High March." Over subsequent weeks, Sharp collected dozens of ballads from the Wallins' neighbors, namely the Shelton, Gosnell, and Chandler families.

Sharp described Mitchell Wallin as a "bad singer" and a difficult fiddler to notate due to his penchant for improvisation, but considered his visit to Wallin and Sands "fruitful." Years later, Berzilla Wallin said many residents of Madison County were initially suspicious of Sharp, believing that his purpose in the area was to secretly map the region for the construction of a dam and reservoir (and thus require the evictions of hundreds of residents). Others thought Sharp was a German spy. Doug Wallin later said that his grandfather, Tom Wallin— who had become a devout Baptist and disapproved of singing any songs other than hymns— threatened to disown family members if they performed for Sharp. In spite of local skepticism, Madison County proved to be one of the more ballad-rich areas Sharp visited.

== American folk music revival ==
Around 1960, folk music enthusiasts Peter and Polly Gott moved to Madison County. They quickly met Lee Wallin, who played the banjo regularly at local events, and Lee introduced them to his relatives. In August 1963, Gott and folk musician John Cohen recorded Lee, Cas, Berzilla and several relatives for the album Old Love Songs and Ballads, which was released by Folkways Records the following year. Cohen made subsequent field recordings of Wallin family members and their cousin, Dillard Chandler, in 1965 and 1967, many of which were released by Smithsonian Folkways on the 2005 album Dark Holler: Old Love Songs and Ballads. Dillard Chandler was the subject of Cohen's 1973 documentary, The End of an Old Song. In the early 1980s, folklorist Mike Yates traveled to Madison County and made several field recordings of Cas Wallin and his wife, Virginia ("Vergie"), as well as Berzilla Wallin. In most recordings, the Wallins sing alone and unaccompanied, although a fiddle is occasionally used for embellishment.

In 1990, Doug Wallin was awarded a National Heritage Fellowship by the National Endowment for the Arts which is the United States government's highest honor in the folk and traditional arts. In 1992 and 1993, he and his brother, Jack, recorded several tracks for the North Carolina Arts Council that were released by Smithsonian Folkways on the album Family Songs and Stories from the North Carolina Mountains.
