= John Cohen (musician) =

American photographer and folk singer (1932–2019)

- Born: John Cohen; August 2, 1932; Sunnyside, Queens, NY
- Died: September 16, 2019 (aged 87) Putnam Valley, NY
- Genres: Old-time; folk
- Occupations: Musician; singer
- Instruments: Autoharp; banjo; fiddle; guitar; mandolin; triangle
- Labels: Folkways; Acoustic Disc; Steidl
- Formerly of: New Lost City Ramblers

John Cohen (August 2, 1932 – September 16, 2019) was an American musician, photographer and film maker who performed and documented the traditional music of the rural South and played a major role in the American folk music revival. In the 1950s and 60s, Cohen was a founding member of the New Lost City Ramblers, a New York-based string band. Cohen made several expeditions to Peru to film and record the traditional culture of the Q'ero, an indigenous people. Cohen was also a professor of visual arts at SUNY Purchase College for 25 years.

== Life and career ==
=== Early life ===
Cohen was born in Queens, New York, where his father, Israel, owned a shoe store. John spent most of his childhood in eastern Long Island, where he learned to play the guitar and banjo. He later attended Yale University where he studied painting. He later on met one of his good friends Tom Paley. They began organizing small concerts for people on their universities campus. Later on, he and Tom both moved to New York City and formed the New Lost City Ramblers. This newly formed band introduced several generations of musicians and audiences to the music styles of rural string bands from the 1920s and '30s.

When living in New York, John was in the heart of a diverse world of art and music forms. He began taking photos of many painters and artists around the area, leading to his love for photography.

=== College career ===
In 1958, Cohen formed the New Lost City Ramblers with Mike Seeger and Tom Paley. In 1962, Paley was replaced by Tracy Schwarz. The Ramblers introduced young urban folk music fans to the work of rural performers such as Dock Boggs, Elizabeth Cotten and Blind Alfred Reed. The influence of the Ramblers has been compared to Harry Smith's Anthology of American Folk Music. It has been suggested that The Grateful Dead song "Uncle John's Band", released on the album Workingman's Dead, was about Cohen and his band. Cohen called this "a true rumor."

Cohen described the outlook of the Ramblers: “We made it possible for urban-based musicians to step out of the demands of the music business and look out into America to get in touch with the genuine energy, drive and craziness out there.” Rather than pursuing commercial success through a polished sound, Cohen and the Ramblers undertook numerous research field trips to the South.

=== Photography/film career ===
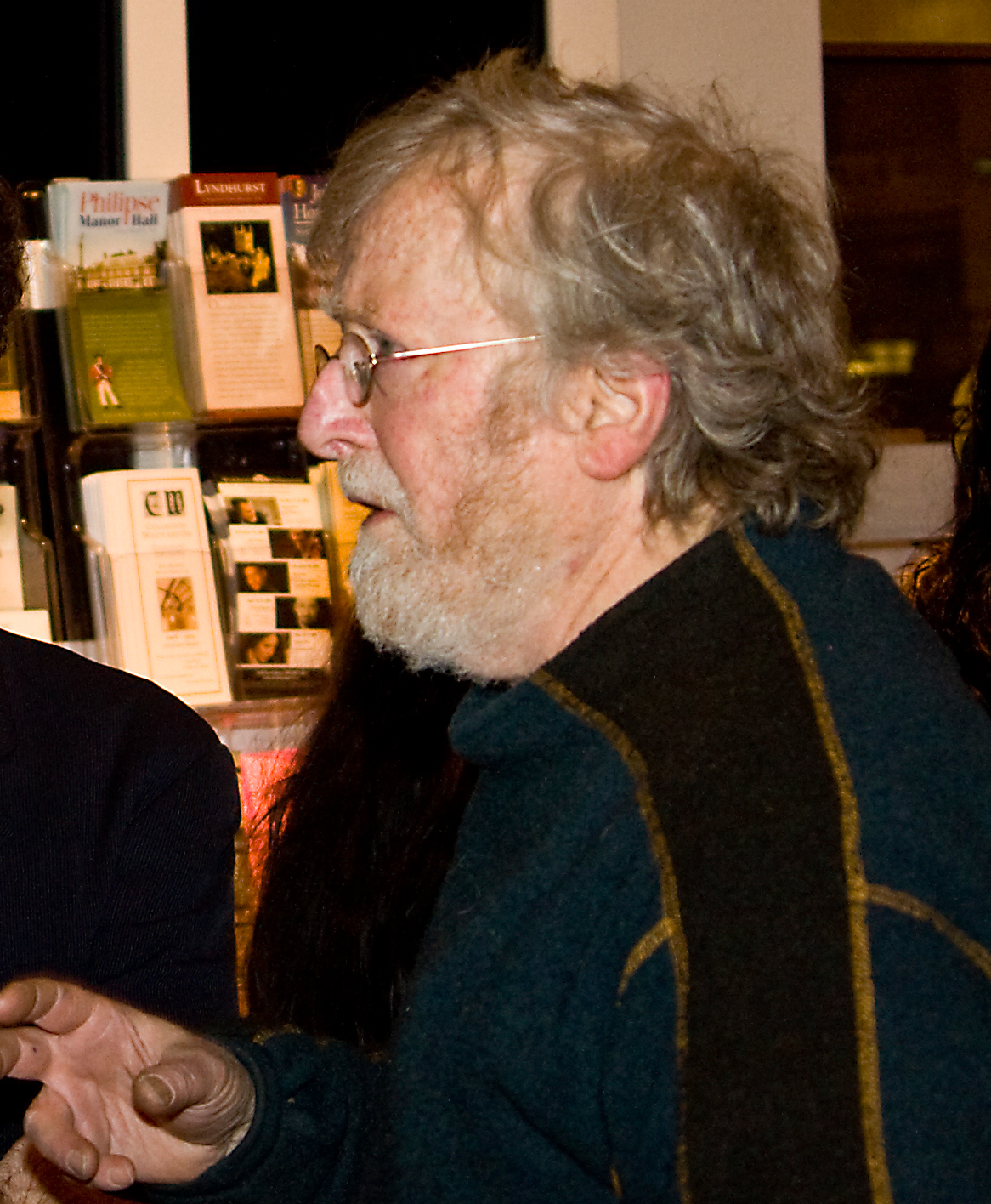
Cohen at a film screening in White Plains, New York on February 27, 2009

Cohen had taken photos and pursued photography for many years. He also enjoyed filmmaking. In 1962, he returned to Kentucky, where he spent six weeks filming the documentary The High Lonesome Sound, which centred on Roscoe Holcomb. This documentary shows the many emotions of life among the poor in those times. It illustrates how music and religion helped people in the Appalachian region maintain hope and traditions during hard times. The title of the film became synonymous with the Appalachian music he captured)

Cohen subsequently recorded Dillard Chandler and made the documentary The End of an Old Song about Chandler and his world.

With Ralph Rinzler and Izzy Young, Cohen created the organization Friends of Old Time Music. They produced a string of concerts featuring traditional musicians in New York in the 1960s

In 1959, Cohen worked as an assistant photographer to Robert Frank and participated in the production of his film Pull My Daisy, the Beat Generation film directed by Frank and Alfred Leslie, written by Jack Kerouac and featuring Allen Ginsberg, Peter Orlovsky, David Amram, and Gregory Corso. In New York, John was at the center of wildly diverse worlds of art and music. He photographed poets Allen Ginsberg and Gregory Corso; painters Franz Kline and Red Grooms; and a young Bob Dylan, who had just arrived in the city. Influenced by Frank, Cohen photographed the Abstract Expressionist painters and Beat writers who congregated in artists' studios and at the Cedar Tavern. Once out there in the world, John got in contact with Life Magazine, and Life paid him for early publication rights of his "beat generation" photos.

Cohen learned about weaving customs of Peru through an archaeology course at Yale. He travelled to the Peruvian Andes in 1956 to write his master's thesis on their weaving techniques. Cohen visited Peru eight times between 1956 and 2005. His work in Peru included audio recordings of Andean music and documentary films as well as books about weaving, music, festivals, and dance. Cohen's recording of a Peruvian wedding song was included on the Voyager Golden Record which was attached to the Voyager spacecraft in 1977.

Cohen ceased to perform with the New Lost City Ramblers in the 1970s, though they would re-unite for a 20th anniversary concert at New York's Carnegie Hall in 1978 and for a 35th anniversary tour in 1993. From 1972 to 1997, Cohen was a Professor of Visual Arts at SUNY Purchase College where he taught photography and drawing.

Cohen made 15 films, including Sara and Maybelle: The Carter Family (1981), and Mountain Music of Peru (1984). He himself was the subject of the Smithsonian Channel's 2009 film Play On, John: A Life in Music

=== Music career ===
In spring 1959, Cohen went to Hazard, Kentucky in search of traditional musicians. A series of chance encounters led him to Roscoe Holcomb who played "Across the Rocky Mountain". "My hair stood up on end," Cohen recalled. "It was the most moving, touching, dynamic, powerful song. Not the song itself, but the way he sang it was just astounding." Cohen's recording trip resulted in the album, Mountain Music of Kentucky, released on the Folkways label.

In 1998, Cohen released his first solo album, Stories the Crow Told Me. Steve Leggett wrote in AllMusic that the record is "not so much a redefinition of Appalachian music as it is an attempt to enter it fully and completely. Cohen does this so well that the album sounds exactly like some great, lost Alan Lomax field tape, and although by definition what Cohen has done here is a facsimile, it sounds so much like the real deal that it hardly matters."

Cohen was associate music producer on the movie Cold Mountain (2003), working with T Bone Burnett. Cohen appeared in the Martin Scorsese documentary about Bob Dylan, No Direction Home (2005), describing Dylan's development in the context of the 1960s folk music revival. From 2008 onwards Cohen performed with The Down Hill Strugglers, an old-time string band featuring younger performers. In 2009, the Smithsonian Channel released a documentary about Cohen, Play On, John: A Life in Music.

In 2011, the Library of Congress acquired the John Cohen archive of manuscripts, films, photographs and audio recordings. Cohen's archive includes interviews with Harry Smith, Roger McGuinn, Pete Seeger, Bob Dylan, Gary Davis and Roscoe Holcomb. The photographs include these artists and Willie Dixon, Woody Guthrie, Alan Lomax, Bill Monroe, The Stanley Brothers, Merle Travis, Muddy Waters and many others.

Cohen resided in Putnam Valley, New York.

Through the 1960s, Cohen continued to make albums for Folkways. The artists included ballad singer Dillard Chandler, “Singing Miner” George Davis, and Roscoe Holcomb. Most of Cohen's recordings of Holcomb appear on two Smithsonian Folkways CDs, The High Lonesome Sound and An Untamed Sense of Control. Cohen's 1953 recordings of Reverend Gary Davis were released by Smithsonian Folkways on the 2003 CD If I had My Way. In 1998, Cohen released his first solo album, Stories the Crow Told Me. Cohen was also associate music producer on the movie Cold Mountain (2003), working with T Bone Burnett.

== Discography ==
=== Solo ===
- Stories The Crow Told Me (Acoustic Disc, 1998)
- Old Man Below (with the Dust Busters) (Smithsonian Folkways, 2012)
- The High & Lonesome Sound (The Legacy Of Roscoe Holcomb) (with Roscoe Holcomb) (Steidl, 2012)

=== With the New Lost City Ramblers ===
- New Lost City Ramblers (Smithsonian Folkways, 1958)
- Old Timey Songs for Children (Smithsonian Folkways, 1959)
- Songs for the Depression (Smithsonian Folkways, 1959)
- New Lost City Ramblers – Vol. 2 (Smithsonian Folkways, 1960)
- Newport Folk Festival, 1960, Vol. 1 (Vanguard - VRS 9083, 1960)
- New Lost City Ramblers – Vol. 3 (Smithsonian Folkways, 1961)
- New Lost City Ramblers (Smithsonian Folkways, 1961)
- New Lost City Ramblers – Vol. 4 (Smithsonian Folkways, 1962)
- American Moonshine and Prohibition Songs (Smithsonian Folkways, 1962)
- New Lost City Ramblers – Vol. 5 (Smithsonian Folkways, 1963)
- Gone to the Country (Smithsonian Folkways, 1963)
- String Band Instrumentals (Smithsonian Folkways, 1964)
- Rural Delivery No. 1 (Smithsonian Folkways, 1964)
- Modern Times (Smithsonian Folkways, 1968)
- New Lost City Ramblers with Cousin Emmy (Smithsonian Folkways, 1968)
- Remembrance of Things to Come (Smithsonian Folkways, 1973)
- On the Great Divide (Smithsonian Folkways, 1975)
- Earth is Earth (Smithsonian Folkways, 1978)
- Tom Paley, John Cohen, Mike Seeger Sing Songs of the New Lost City Ramblers (Smithsonian Folkways, 1978)
- 20th Anniversary Concert, with Elizabeth Cotten, Highwoods String Band, Pete Seeger & the Green Grass Cloggers (Flying Fish (Rounder), 1978)
- The Early Years, 1958–1962 (Smithsonian Folkways, 1991)
- Out Standing in their Field: The New Lost City Ramblers, Vol 2, 1963–1973 (Smithsonian Folkways, 1993)
- There Ain't No Way Out (Smithsonian Folkways, 1997)
- 40 Years of Concert Recordings (Rounder, 2001)
- 50 Years: Where Do You Come From? Where Do You Go? (Smithsonian Folkways, 2008)

=== With Mike Seeger ===
- The Second Annual Farewell Reunion (Mercury, 1973) [New Lost City Ramblers play on one track]
- Third Annual Farewell Reunion (Rounder, 1994) [New Lost City Ramblers play on one track]

=== Singles & EPs ===
- Prohibition Is A Failure (with the Dust Busters) (Not On Label, 2010)

=== Videos ===
- That High Lonesome Sound (Films Of American Rural Life And Music) (Shanachie, 1996)

== Personal life ==
In 1965 Cohen married Penny Seeger, a member of the musical Seeger family. They had a daughter, Sonya Cohen Cramer, a singer who died in 2015, and a son, Rufus. Penny accompanied her husband to Peru and collaborated on recording music. She died in 1993.

John Cohen died of cancer at the age of 87 on September 16, 2019.

== Monographs ==
- There Is No Eye: John Cohen Photographs, introduction by Greil Marcus. New York: powerHouse Books, 2001. ISBN 1-57687-107-X, ISBN 1-57687-119-3
- Young Bob: John Cohen’s Early Photographs of Bob Dylan, Brooklyn: powerHouse Books, 2003. ISBN 1-57687-199-1
- Past, Present, Peru, Göttingen, Germany: Steidl, 2010. ISBN 978-3-86930-103-7
- The High & Lonesome Sound: The Legacy of Roscoe Holcomb, Göttingen, Germany: Steidl, 2012. ISBN 978-3-86930-254-6
- Here and Gone: Bob Dylan & Woody Guthrie & the 1960s, Göttingen, Germany: Steidl, 2014. ISBN 978-3-86930-604-9
- Walking In the Light, Göttingen, Germany: Steidl, 2015. ISBN 978-3-86930-772-5
- Cheap Rents…and de Kooning Göttingen, Germany: Steidl, 2016. ISBN 978-3-86930-903-3

== Recent publications ==
- Beat Generation: New York, San Francisco, Paris, Paris, France: Centre Pompidou, 2016. ISBN 978-2-84426-733-7
- Pull My Daisy, Paris, France: Editions Macula and Centre Pompidou, 2016. Text by Rollet, Patrice; Sargeant, Jack. ISBN 978-2-86589-089-7
- Petrus, Stephen and Cohen, Ronald. Folk City: New York and the American Folk Music Revival, New York: Oxford University Press, 2015. Foreword by Peter Yarrow. ISBN 978-0-19-023102-6
- Glimcher, Mildred L.Happenings: New York, 1958-1963, New York: The Monacelli Press LLC. 2012 ISBN 978-1-58093-307-0

== Selected filmography ==
- The High Lonesome Sound (1962). Streaming on Folkstreams
- Fifty Miles from Times Square (1970)
- The End of an Old Song (1972). A DVD version is in print as part of Dark Holler: Old Love Songs and Ballads (2005-09-27). Washington: Smithsonian Folkways. Streaming on Folkstreams.
- Musical Holdouts (1975) Streaming on Folkstreams.
- Q'eros: The Shape of Survival (1979)
- Peruvian Weaving: a continuous warp (1980)
- Sara and Maybelle (1981)
- Gypsies Sing Long Ballads (1982), streaming on Folkstreams
- Mountain Music of Peru (1984)
- Dancing with the Incas (1990)
- Carnival in Q'eros (1992)
- Play on John: A Life in Music (2009) on Smithsonian Networks
- Visions of Mary Frank (2014)

== Selected discography (as producer) ==
- High Atmosphere: Ballads and Banjo Tunes from Virginia and North Carolina (1975)
- There Is No Eye: Music for Photographs, Smithsonian Folkways SFW CD 40091 (2001), companion to the book
- Back Roads to Cold Mountain (2004)
