= Sheila Kay Adams =

American storyteller, author, musician

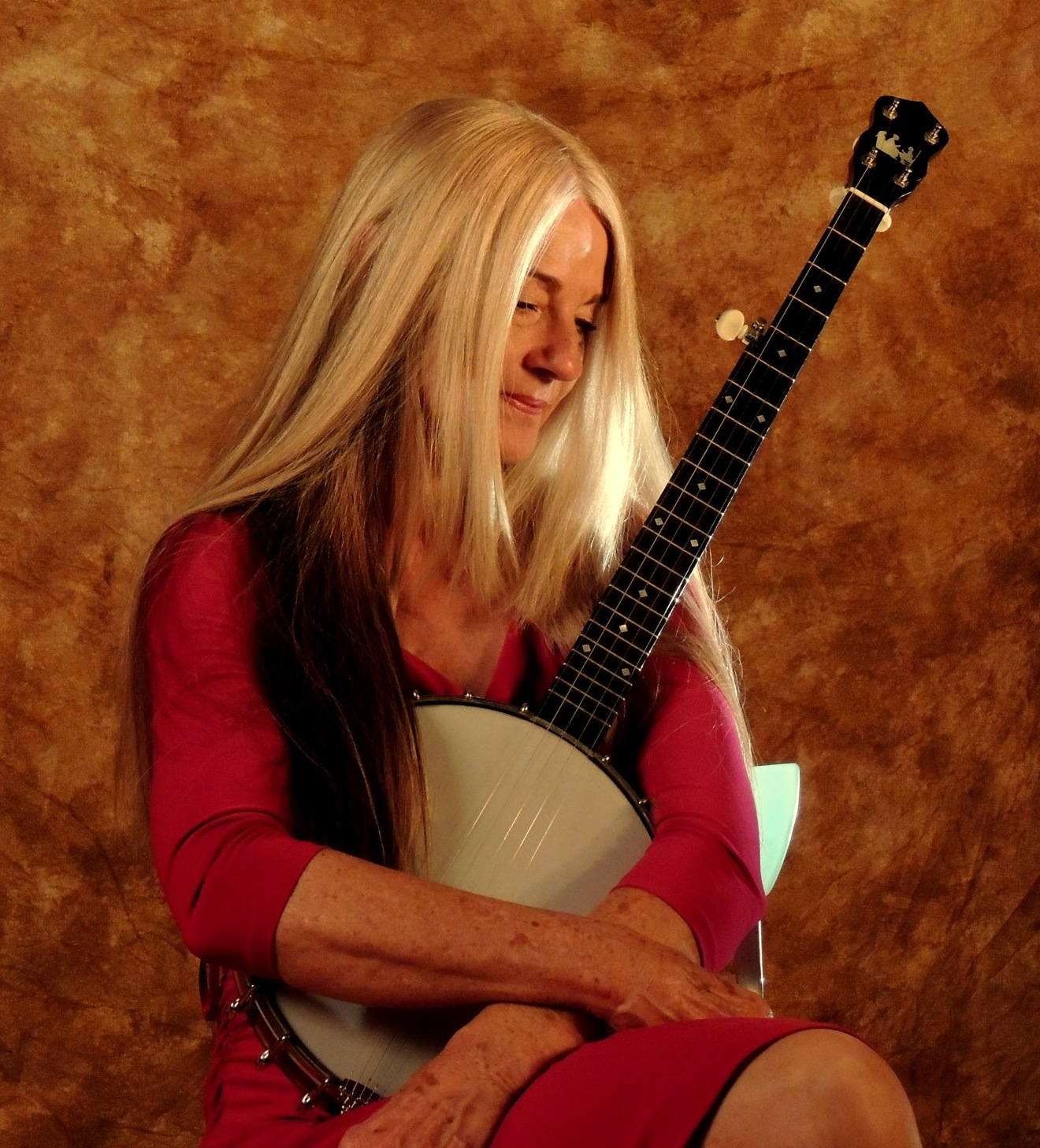

Background information
- Born: Sheila Kay Adams; March 18, 1953 (age 73)
- Origin: Sodom Laurel, Madison County, North Carolina, U.S.
- Genres: Traditional, Old-time music, Storytelling
- Occupations: Musician, ballad, singer-songwriter, storyteller
- Instruments: Vocals, banjo, guitar
- Years active: 1970–present
- Website: www.sheilakayadams.com

Sheila Kay Adams is an American storyteller, author, and musician from the Sodom Laurel community in Madison County, North Carolina.

== Background ==
A seventh-generation ballad singer, storyteller, and claw-hammer banjo player, Sheila Kay Adams was born and raised in the Sodom Laurel community of Madison County, North Carolina, an area renowned for its unbroken tradition of unaccompanied singing of traditional southern Appalachian ballads that dates back to the early Scots/Irish and English Settlers in the mid-17th century.

Adams learned to sing from her great-aunt Dellie Chandler Norton and other notable singers in the community such as Dillard Chandler and members of the Wallin Family. She began performing in public in her teens, and throughout her career she has performed at festivals, events, music camps, and workshops around the United States and the United Kingdom.

In 1975, Adams graduated from Mars Hill College. In 2003 she was named Alumna of the Year and later received a LifeWorks recognition in appreciation for her shared commitment to service and responsibility, presented at the college's LifeWorks 150 Alumni Celebration in April 2007.

After teaching in the North Carolina public schools for seventeen years, Adams turned to full-time music and storytelling.

== Music, storytelling, and performance ==
Adams performs ballads from English, Scottish, and Irish traditions as she learned them from her ancestors, as well as innovating other tunes with a signature drop-thumb clawhammer style on the five-string banjo, an ability which has won her recognition and awards. Adams' extensive knowledge of balladry has also been featured in National Public Radio's The Thistle & Shamrock program with Fiona Ritchie.

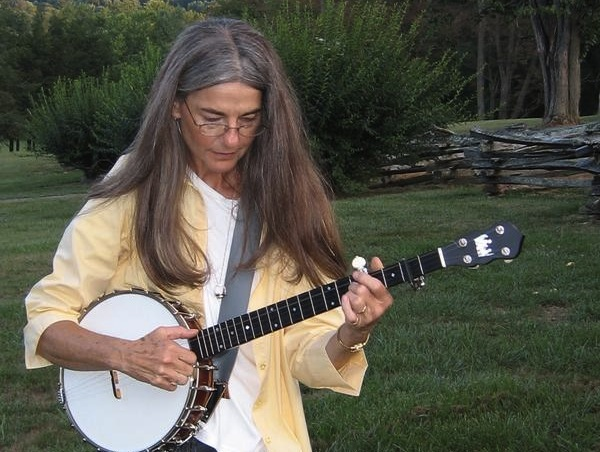
Adams at the Zebulon B. Vance Birthplace in Buncombe County, North Carolina

Adams' ballad singing and musical performances have also been featured internationally, including the Celtic Colours International Festival in Cape Breton Island, Nova Scotia, Canada.

As a storyteller Adams often appears at major festivals including the National Storytelling Festival in Jonesborough, Tennessee. She also performed at the 1976 and 2003 Smithsonian Folklife Festival as part of The Bicentennial Celebration and Appalachia: Heritage and Harmony.

Adams has been a regular performer with "A Swannanoa Solstice" in Asheville, North Carolina, alongside such artists as Al Petteway, Amy White, and Robin Bullock. In 2004 she appeared at Art6 Gallery in Richmond, Virginia in conjunction with an exhibition of Sodom Laurel photographs by Rob Amberg.

Adams performs and teaches regularly at the Swannanoa Gathering, a series of week-long workshops in various folk arts held in July and August on the campus of Warren Wilson College, near Asheville, North Carolina. She has taught workshops in banjo playing, unaccompanied singing, and storytelling.

== Published works ==
In 1995, the University of North Carolina Press published Adams' first book, Come Go Home With Me, a semi-autobiographical collection of short stories. The book was praised as "pure mountain magic" by Life magazine and was a winner of the 1997 Clark Cox Historical Fiction Award, North Carolina Society of Historians.

Her second book was the novel My Old True Love, published in 2004 by Algonquin Books. It was a finalist for the SIBA Book Award and praised by Kirkus Reviews as "Deeply satisfying storytelling propelled by the desires of full-bodied, prickly characters set against a landscape rendered in all its beauty and harshness."

== Awards and honors ==
In 1998, Adams received the Brown Hudson Award from the North Carolina Folklore Society in recognition of her valuable contributions to the study of North Carolina folk traditions.

In 2013, Adams was one of nine individuals to receive a National Heritage Fellowship from the National Endowment for the Arts.

Adams was named among eight North Carolina artists to receive the 2016 North Carolina Heritage Award for outstanding contributions to the state's cultural heritage.

In 2026, Adams was named a United States Artists (USA) Fellow.

== Discography ==
Adams has recorded several albums of ballads, songs, and stories including:

- Loving Forward, Loving Back (1985)
- Spring In the Burton Cove (1990)
- Don't Get Above Your Raising (1992)
- Christmas on the Mountain (1998)
- What Ever Happened to John Parrish's Boy? (1999)
- Come Go Home With Me (audio book)
- My Dearest Dear (2000)
- All The Other Fine Things (2004)
- Live at the International Storytelling Festival (2007)
- Legacy I: Banjo Tunes (2014)
- Legacy II: Traditional Ballads (2016)
- Legacy III (2017) Storytelling Live 2013 International Storytelling Festival

== Filmography ==
- Last of the Mohicans (1992); credited as the "humming woman" under the name Sheila Adams Barnhill
- Songcatcher (2000); credited three times—first for her performance in the film as "Barn band banjo player", second for her work as a vocal coach for the cast, and third as the film's official advisor on traditional balladry.
- Madison County Project: Documenting the Sound (2006), a documentary film about ballad singers in Madison County; Adams appears as herself.

== See also ==
- Appalachian music
- National Heritage Fellowship
- Clawhammer
- Banjo
- Storyteller
- Ballads
- North Carolina Heritage Award
