= Dillard Chandler =

American Appalachian folk singer

- Born: April 16, 1907
- Died: 24 January 1992 (aged 84)
- Genres: Appalachian Folk
- Instrument: Vocals
- Years active: circa 1963–1992
- Label: Smithsonian Folkways

Dillard Chandler (April 16, 1907 – January 24, 1992) was an American Appalachian Folk singer from Madison County, North Carolina. His a cappella performances on compilation albums were recorded by folklorist and musicologist John Cohen.

== Early life ==
Chandler grew up in an old log cabin in the isolated mountain community of Sodom, North Carolina. This section of the North Carolina mountains is particularly rich in ballads, and noted folklorist Cecil Sharp transcribed several "Old World" ballads sung to him by several of Chandler's relatives in 1916. Chandler described the hills he lived in as being too rugged for a car to access. Often, his walk to school would be made impossible by footlogs being washed away by a creek. Chandler said that as soon as he became old enough, he left school to work in the logging industry. He was illiterate.

== Recordings ==
During the American folk music revival in the 1960s, John Cohen traveled to Western North Carolina to research and record traditional ballad singers. Old Love Songs & Ballads from the Big Laurel, North Carolina and Dark Holler: Old Love Songs and Ballads are compilation albums of these recordings.

The subject matter of the traditional songs is often dark; there are themes of murder, revenge, infidelity, and abandoned children. The origin of Chandler's songs range from 16th century Spanish ballads, to a tale of a hanging in nearby Burnsville, to a prison song from Gastonia. Allmusic writes that Chandler sings with "deft precision, often with the song's strong sexual undercurrents intact".

The New York Times describes Dark Holler as "traditional songs about love and murder usually traceable to England, a century or more before, but sung in a style rooted in the region: the singers all stretch out, irregularly, on vowels of their choosing, and add upturned yips to the end of stanzas".

== Singing style ==
Chandler knew hundreds of songs that were shared in the community and passed on through generations. He was a cousin of fellow Madison County singers Lloyd Chandler, Dellie Chandler Norton and members of the Wallin Family. He describes how singing was part of his community in the liner notes to Dark Holler:

The first singing that I ever heard was old-timey meeting songs, and these old songs like I sing, and these frolics where they get together and pick and sing and drink a little. Maybe a "lassie makin'," or maybe a corn shuckin', maybe a gallon hid in the corn pile. They'd go ahead an' shuck into that—pick the banjo, have a dance. The only kind of music I know anything about is old ballads—just learning songs from somebody else that I've heard sing 'em.

Cohen noted how Chandler's vocals are reflective of the Appalachian idiosyncratic style of "extended phrasing", and ending lines with a falsetto "yip". British Folklorist Cecil Sharp wrote in his research of Appalachian singers:

The habit of dwelling arbitrarily upon certain notes of the melody, generally the weaker accents. This practice, which is almost universal, by disguising the rhythm and breaking up the monotonous regularity of the phrases, produces an effect of improvisation and freedom from rule with is very pleasing.

== Influence ==
According to Cohen, in 1969 Bob Dylan knew Chandler's singing, despite the fact that Old Love Songs & Ballads had sold only fifty copies at the time. Dylan had a copy of the album.

Appalachian author and musician Sheila Kay Adams said of Chandler, "Dillard was kind of an anomaly; he was caught in between worlds. He was a wonderful singer. Now, his voice was odd, and I think that it was from Dillard that I learned that weird phrasing that is so common to these love songs, that sets them apart."

Chandler's version of "I Wish My Baby Was Born" has been covered by Uncle Tupelo, Tim Eriksen, Riley Baugus and Tim O'Brien (for the Cold Mountain soundtrack), and The Be Good Tanyas.

== Documentary ==
Cohen created a short documentary film entitled The End of an Old Song that features Chandler's hardscrabble lifestyle. Chandler is shown in his primitive mountain cabin, and also in a trip to town to socialize at a diner. Cohen briefly interviews Chandler, and in response to a question about the last time he had been in love, the reply is:

Well, I ain't been in love for 10 or 15 years. There ain't much to that. When I want a woman, I go to town and fetch one up and bring her out here a couple of nights and send her back and that's that.

Cohen's motivation in making the film was to debunk stereotypes of Appalachian folksingers being merely the preservers of traditional British ballads, with few modern influences or styles. He wrote in the liner notes, "With the example of Dillard in mind, I could envision ballad singers as impure—rich with contradictions and a new vitality, which could propel the songs to future generations." He believed that while Chandler was raised in a strong Old World ballad tradition, much of his work bore more resemblance to the struggles of modern life than to Old World storytelling.

A bonus DVD of the documentary is included in the packaging of Dark Holler.

== Later life ==
Residents in his native Madison County described Chandler as a "mysterious man" who "didn't live in one specific place, but would just show up from time to time". Unlike many such folk singers discovered during the folk revival of the 1960s, Chandler rarely performed at festivals or on radio. Travel arrangements were made for Chandler to play the 1967 Newport Folk Festival, but he did not make the trip. The 1967 University of Chicago Folk Festival saw Chandler's only visit outside the mountains. His performance was marked by his shy and eccentric mannerisms, as he rocked back and forth and sung facing the side of the stage.

Chandler spent time working in Asheville, and was "remembered as a man who loved to sing".

== Selected discography ==
- Old Love Songs & Ballads from the Big Laurel, North Carolina, Folkways Records, 1964 (Dillard Chandler is on 5 of the 14 tracks on this album)
- The End Of An Old Song, Folkways Records, 1975 (Re-released by Tompkins Square, 2014)
- High Atmosphere: Ballads and Banjo Tunes from Virginia and North Carolina, Rounder Records, 1975 (Dillard Chandler sings 2 of the 33 tracks on this album)
- Dark Holler: Old Love Songs and Ballads, Smithsonian Folkways, 2005 (Dillard Chandler is on 14 of the 26 tracks on this album)
