= Cecil Sharp =

English folklorist and song collector (1859–1924)

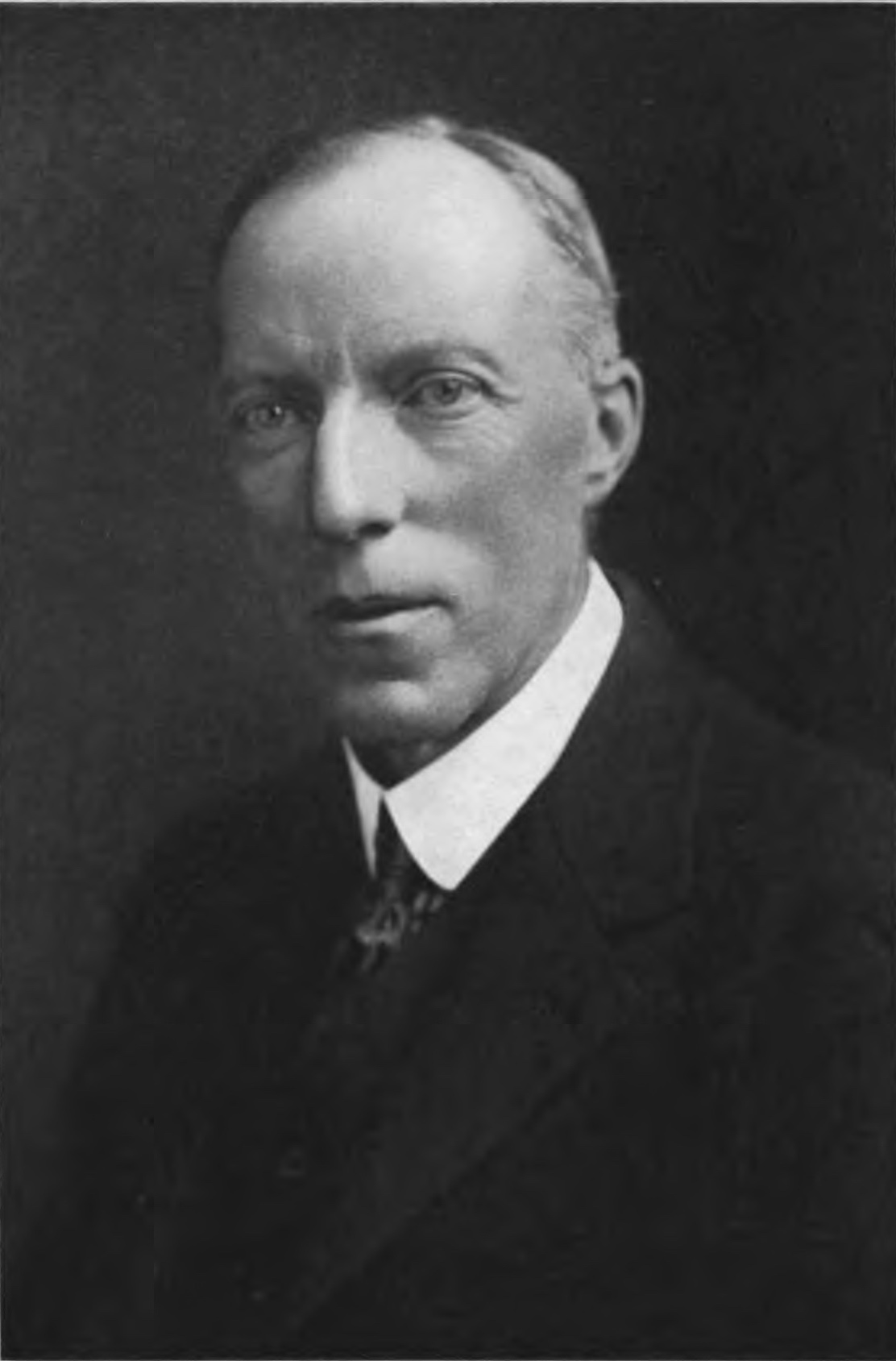
- Born: 22 November 1859; Camberwell, Surrey, England
- Died: 23 June 1924 (aged 64); Hampstead, London, England
- Education: Clare College, Cambridge
- Occupations: Folklorist; song collector
- Notable work: English Folk Song: Some Conclusions English Folk Songs from the Southern Appalachians The Country Dance Book
- Relatives: Evelyn Sharp (sister)

Cecil James Sharp (22 November 1859 – 23 June 1924) was an English collector of folk songs, folk dances and instrumental music, as well as a lecturer, teacher, composer and musician. He was a key figure in the folk-song revival in England during the Edwardian period. According to Roud's Folk Song in England, Sharp was the country's "single most important figure in the study of folk song and music".

Sharp collected over four thousand folk songs, both in South-West England and the Southern Appalachian region of the United States. He published an extensive series of songbooks based on his fieldwork, often with piano arrangements, and wrote an influential theoretical work, English Folk Song: Some Conclusions. He notated examples of English Morris dancing, and played an important role in the revival both of the Morris and English country dance. In 1911, he co-founded the English Folk Dance Society, which was later merged with the Folk-Song Society to form the English Folk Dance and Song Society.

Cecil Sharp's musical legacy extends into English orchestral music, and the classroom singing experienced by generations of schoolchildren. Many of the most popular musicians of the British Folk Revival from the 1960s to the present day have used songs collected by Sharp in their work. Scores of Morris dance teams throughout England, and also abroad, demonstrate the resilience of the revival he played a large part in sustaining. In the US, the Country Dance and Song Society was founded with Sharp's support, and dancers there continue to participate in styles he developed.

Over the last four decades, Sharp's work has attracted heated debate, with claims and counter-claims regarding selectivity, nationalism, appropriation, bowdlerisation and racism.

== Early life ==
Sharp was born in Camberwell, Surrey, the eldest son of James Sharp, a slate merchant, and his wife, Jane née Bloyd. His parents, both music lovers, named him after St. Cecilia, patron saint of music, on whose feast he was born.

He was educated at Uppingham School and University College School, and Clare College, Cambridge, graduating in 1883.

== Return to England ==
In 1892 Sharp returned to England, and on 22 August 1893 at East Clevedon, Somerset, he married Constance Dorothea Birch, also a music lover. They had three daughters and a son. Also in 1893 he was taken on as a music teacher by Ludgrove School, a preparatory school then in north London. During his seventeen years in the post, he took on several other musical jobs. After his marriage in 1893, Sharp became a vegetarian for health reasons and took interest in spiritualism and theosophy.

From 1896 Sharp was Principal of the Hampstead Conservatoire of Music, a half-time post which provided a house. In July 1905 he resigned from this post after a prolonged dispute about payment and his right to take on students for extra tuition. He had to leave the Principal's house, and apart from his position at Ludgrove his income was henceforth derived largely from lecturing and publishing on folk music.

=== English folk song and dance ===
Sharp was not the first to research folk songs in England, which had already been studied by late-19th century collectors like Lucy Broadwood, Frank Kidson and Sabine Baring-Gould. He became aware of English folk music in 1899, when he witnessed a performance by the Headington Quarry Morris dancers just outside Oxford. He approached their musician William Kimber, an expert player of the Anglo-concertina and a skilled dancer, and asked permission to notate some of the dances. Kimber went on to become Sharp's main source for the notation of Cotswold Morris Dancing, gave demonstrations at his lectures, and became a lifelong friend.

In August 1903, Sharp visited the home of his friend Charles Marson, a Christian Socialist he had met in Adelaide, and by then a vicar in Hambridge, Somerset. There he heard the gardener John England sing the traditional song The Seeds of Love. Although Sharp had already joined the Folk-Song Society in 1901, this was his first experience of folk song in the field, and it set him on a new career path. Between 1904 and 1914 he collected more than 1,600 songs in rural Somerset and over 700 songs from elsewhere in England. He published five volumes of Folk Songs from Somerset and numerous other books, including collections of sea shanties and folk carols, and became a passionate advocate for folk song, giving numerous lectures, and setting out his manifesto in English Folk Song: Some Conclusions in 1907.

In the years between 1907 and the First World War, Sharp became more focused on traditional dance. In 1905 he met Mary Neal, the organiser of the Espérance Girls' Club, a philanthropic organisation for working-class young women in London, who was seeking suitable dances for them to perform. This initiated a partnership which, though initially cordial and successful, soured over an ideological disagreement, Sharp's insistence on correct traditional practice coming up against Neal's preference for flamboyance and energy. This developed into a power struggle over control of the Morris dance movement, and finally into a public feud. Sharp pursued his interest in dance through a teaching post at the new School of Morris Dancing under the auspices of the South West Polytechnic in Chelsea, set up by the Principal, Dorette Wilkie, and stepped up his field collecting efforts, resulting in the publication of his notations over five volumes of The Morris Book (1907–1913). It has been argued that Sharp emphasised the Cotswold tradition of Morris dancing at the expense of other regional styles, although he did collect dances in Derbyshire.

Sharp also developed an interest in sword dancing, and between 1911 and 1913 published three volumes of The Sword Dances of Northern England, which described the obscure and near-extinct Rapper sword dances of Northumbria and the Long Sword dances of North Yorkshire. This led to the revival of both traditions in their home areas, and later elsewhere.

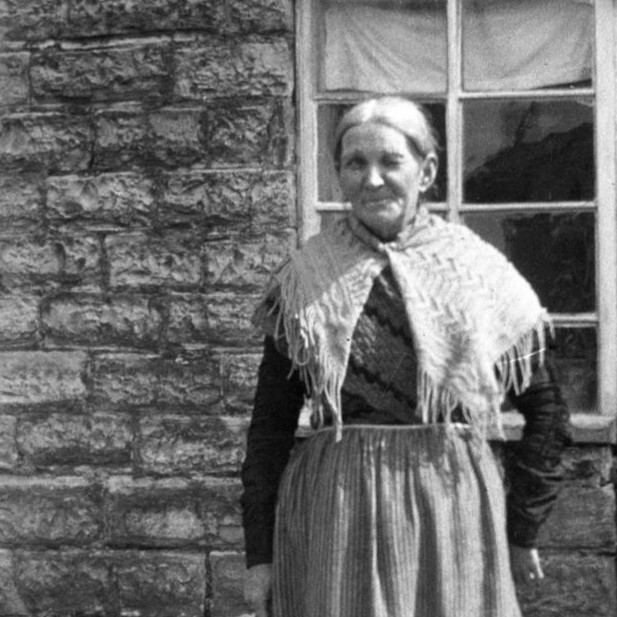
The Somerset folk singer Lucy White (1848–1923)

=== Sharp as fieldworker ===
Sharp, assisted initially by Marson, worked by asking around in rural Somerset communities for people who might sing old songs and located many informants, the sisters Louisa Hooper and Lucy White of Langport amongst the most prolific. Sharp was able to relate well to people of a different social class, and established friendships with several singers; after his death, Louisa Hooper wrote of his generosity in terms of payments, gifts, and outings. He also collected a significant number of songs from Gypsies. In the Appalachians Sharp and Maud Karpeles similarly used local knowledge and their own initiative to find singers, and again made lasting friendships.

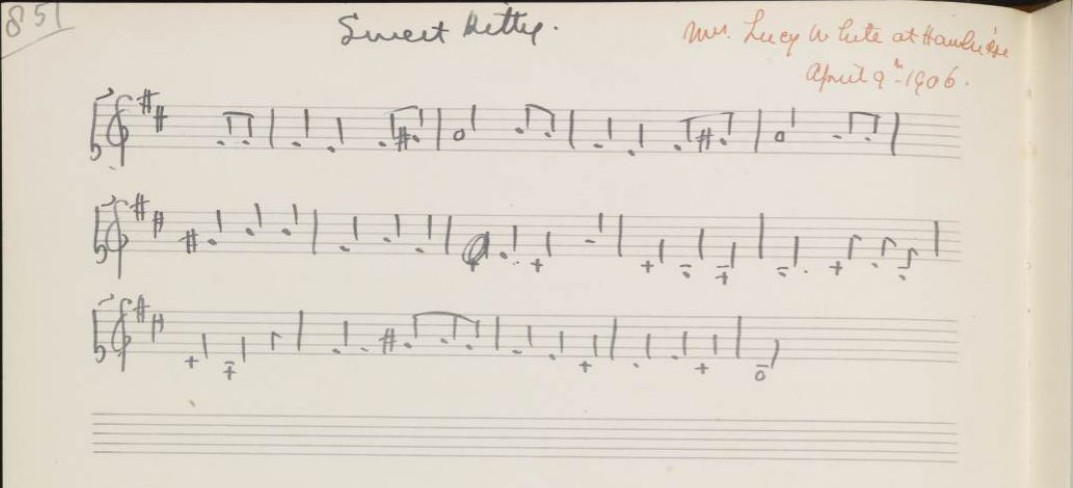
"Sweet Kitty" transcribed from Lucy White by Cecil Sharp in 1906

Sharp notated songs mostly by ear. He experimented with the new technology of the phonograph, but rejected it on account of a lack of portability and its potential to intimidate. He had assistance in taking down lyrics from Marson in Somerset, and Karpeles in the Appalachians, while making the musical notations himself. His transcriptions, which included melodic variations, were generally accurate, although some nuances were missed. Sharp was meticulous in noting singers' names, locations, and dates, enabling subsequent biographical research. He made many photographic portraits of singers at their homes or workplaces, providing a valuable record of life amongst rural working people in both South-West England and the Appalachian Mountains.

=== Folk song in schools ===
In 1902, at a time when state-sponsored mass public schooling was in its infancy, Sharp, then a music teacher, compiled a song book for use in schools. This contained a mixture of patriotic 'National Songs' (The British Grenadiers, Rule Britannia, etc.) and folk material. As his knowledge of folk song grew, he rejected the 'National Songs', which were absent from the 1906 collection English Folk Songs for Schools, co-written with Baring-Gould and using Sharp's piano arrangements. Sharp was determined that folk song should be at the heart of the curriculum, and fought the Board of Education in 1905 over their list of songs recommended for schools, which included many 'National Songs'. His colleagues Frank Kidson and Lucy Broadwood did not share his view, however, and the committee of the Folk-Song Society voted to approve the Board's list, causing a rift with Sharp.

=== Sharp's theories ===
After he struggled with the Board of Education, Sharp published English Folk Song: Some Conclusions, in which he pursued his ideas about folk songs in schools. His main aim was to expound a theory for the development of folk song, based on Darwinian evolution and oral transmission - the passage of songs down the generations by word of mouth. Sharp put forward three principles: Continuity – individual songs had survived recognisably over centuries; Variation – songs existed in multiple versions as singers altered them; and Selection – a community would choose the most pleasing version. This implied that songs had no individual composer, since they had evolved to their present form "as the pebble on the sea shore is rounded and polished by the action of the waves". However, some in the folk song movement, such as Kidson, were sceptical of this theory.

Sharp argued that folk songs expressed Englishness, and it was vital that they should be taught in schools to inculcate a sense of national identity. He also suggested that their melodies should form the basis of a new English movement in art music, in competition with the musical hegemony of Germany, a belief shared by Vaughan Williams and other composers.

=== Bowdlerisation ===
Sharp and Marson bowdlerised some of their song texts, especially those containing references to sexual intercourse. Given the prudery of the Edwardian era, these could never have been published in full (especially in a school textbook), but Sharp did note such lyrics accurately in his field notebooks, thus preserving them for posterity. A good example of the transformation of a formerly erotic song into one suitable for all audiences is Gently Johnny My Jingalo. The immediate goal of Sharp's project – disseminating the distinctive, and hitherto little known melodies of these songs through music education – might also explain why he considered the song texts less important.

=== English Folk Dance Society, afterwards English Folk Dance and Song Society ===
In 1911 Sharp co-founded the English Folk Dance Society, which promoted the traditional dances through workshops held nationwide, and which later merged with the Folk-Song Society in 1932 to form the English Folk Dance and Song Society (EFDSS). The current London headquarters of the EFDSS is named Cecil Sharp House in his honour.

=== Influence on English classical music ===
Sharp's work coincided with a period of nationalism in classical music, the idea being to reinvigorate and give distinctiveness to English classical composition by grounding it in the characteristic melodic patterns and recognisable tone intervals and ornaments of its national folk music. Among the composers who took up this goal was Ralph Vaughan Williams, who incorporated many melodies from Sharp's collections into his compositions, as well as a number from his own fieldwork in England.

== In America ==
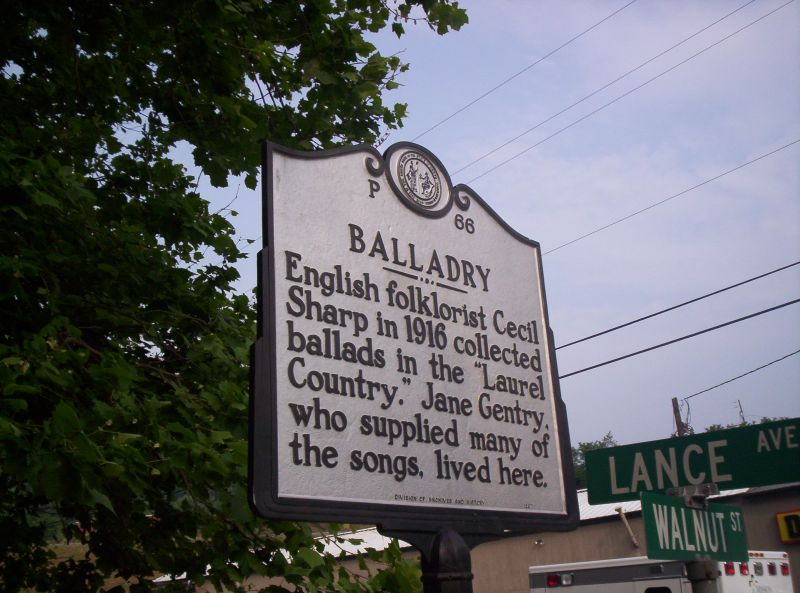
A sign commemorating Cecil Sharp's visit to Hot Springs, North Carolina

During the years of the First World War, Sharp found it difficult to support himself through his customary work in England, and decided to try to earn his living in the United States. He was invited to act as dance consultant for a 1915 New York production of A Midsummer Night's Dream and went on to give successful lectures and classes across the country on English folk song and especially folk dance. He met the wealthy philanthropist Helen Storrow in Boston, and with her and other colleagues was instrumental in setting up the Country Dance and Song Society.

He also met Olive Dame Campbell, who brought with her a portfolio of British-origin ballads she had collected in the Southern Appalachian mountains. The quality of her collection convinced Sharp to make several song collecting expeditions into the remote mountain backcountry with his collaborator Maud Karpeles during the years 1916–1918, following in the footsteps of Olive Campbell and other collectors such as Lorraine Wyman and Katherine Jackson French.

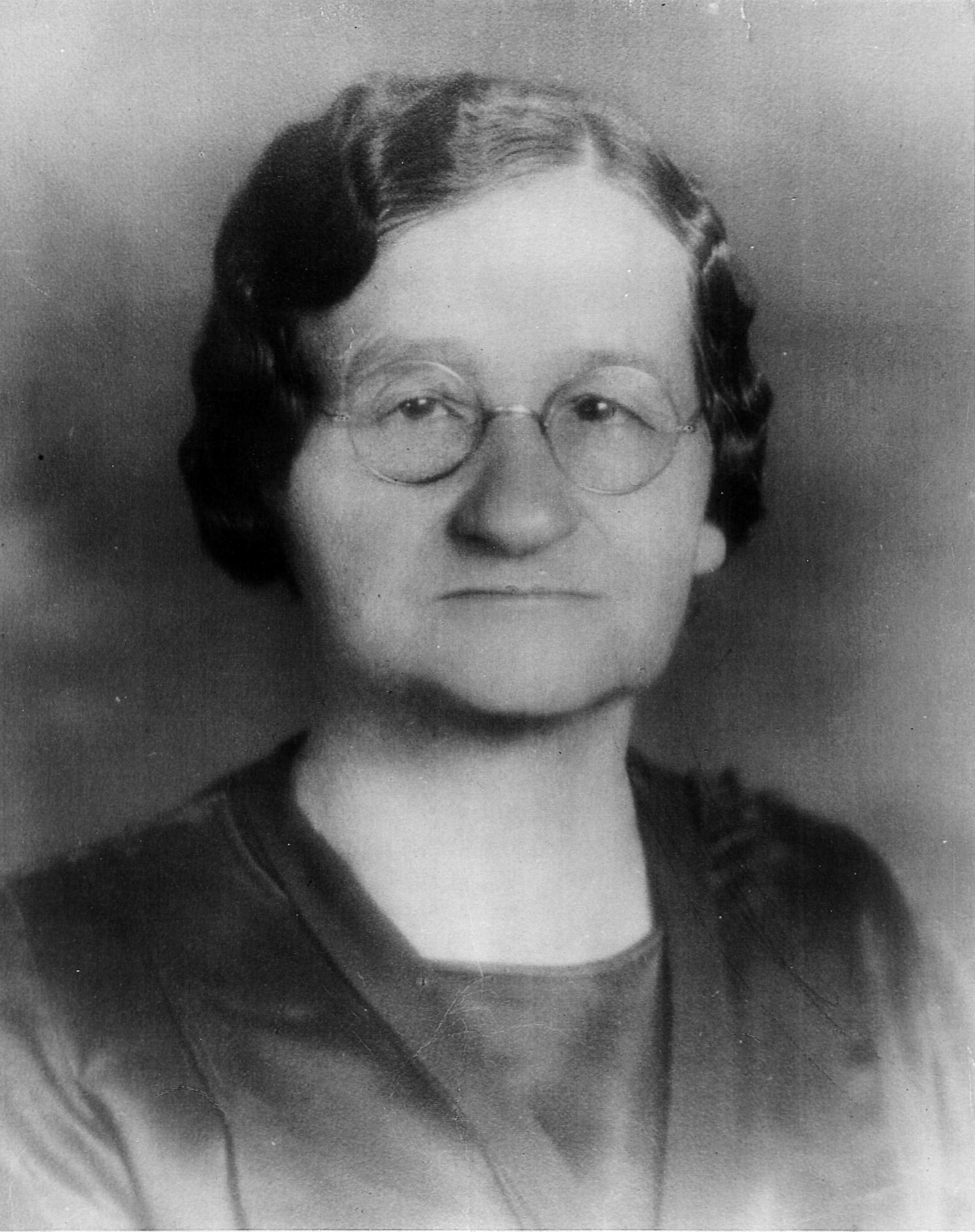
Mary Sands (1872–1949) of Madison County, NC, c. 1920

Travelling through the Appalachian Mountains in Virginia, North Carolina, Kentucky and Tennessee, often covering many miles on foot over rough terrain, Sharp and Karpeles recorded a treasure trove of folk songs, many of British origin, though in versions quite different from those Sharp had collected in rural England, and some altogether extinct in the old country. In remote log cabins Sharp would notate the tunes by ear, while Karpeles took down the words, and they collected songs from singers including Jane Hicks Gentry, Mary Sands and young members of the Ritchie family of Kentucky. Sharp was particularly interested in the tunes, which he found very beautiful and often set in 'gapped scales'.

Sharp wrote the following words a few weeks after he arrived in Appalachia:

The people are just English of the late eighteenth or early nineteenth century. They speak English, look English, and their manners are old-fashioned English. Heaps of words and expressions they use habitually in ordinary conversation are obsolete, and have been in England a long time. I find them very easy to get on with, and have no difficulty in making them sing and show their enthusiasm for their songs. I have taken down very nearly one hundred already, and many of these are quite unknown to me and aesthetically of the very highest value. Indeed, it is the greatest discovery I have made since the original one I made in England sixteen years ago.

This strong focus on 'Englishness' is evident in Sharp's work, and he has been criticised for failing to recognise that many of the songs he collected were derived from the Scottish rather than the English ballad tradition.

Olive Dame Campbell and her husband John had led Sharp and Karpeles to areas with a high concentration of white people of English or Scots-Irish ancestry, so the collectors had little sense of the cultural mosaic of White, Black, Indigenous and multiracial Americans that existed across Appalachia, or of the interactions between these groups that had resulted in a dynamic, hybridised folk tradition. For instance, having witnessed in white communities a form of square dancing that he christened the "Kentucky Running Set", Sharp interpreted it inaccurately as the survival of a 17th-century English style, whereas in fact it contained significant African-American and European elements.

In their search for communities rich in British-origin songs, Sharp and Karpeles avoided German-American communities, and on one occasion turned back from a village when they realised it was an African-American settlement. Using an offensive term then in common usage, Sharp wrote: "We tramped – mainly uphill. When we reached the cove we found it peopled by n----s ... All our troubles and spent energy for nought." However, unlike other mountain collectors of the time he did take down ballads from two Black singers, one of whom he described in his field notes thus: "Aunt Maria [Tomes] is an old coloured woman who was a slave belonging to Mrs Coleman... she sang very beautifully in a wonderfully musical way and with clear and perfect intonation... rather a nice old lady".

Sharp and Karpeles noted down a huge number of songs, many of which would otherwise have been lost, and contributed to the continuing tradition of balladry in the Appalachian Mountains. Their collection was described by ballad expert Bertrand Bronson as "without question the foremost contribution to the study of British-American folk-song", and by Archie Green as a "monumental contribution… an unending scroll in cultural understanding". However, it can be argued that a fascination with Child Ballads and other old British material led him and the other fieldworkers of his era to misrepresent Appalachian folk music as an overwhelmingly Anglo-Saxon or Celtic tradition, and overlook its cultural diversity.

Elizabeth DiSavino, in her 2020 biography of Katherine Jackson French, has claimed that Sharp had neglected to give proper acknowledgement to female and Scottish-diaspora sources, although in fact he mentioned both in his Introduction to English Folk Songs from the Southern Appalachians.

== Political views ==
Sharp identified with the political left of his day. He joined the Fabian Society, a Socialist organisation, in 1900, and in later years became a supporter of the Labour Party. In his younger days he was considered a radical and, according to a teaching colleague, liked to "pull the legs off the Tories". While at Cambridge, Sharp heard the lectures of William Morris, which probably influenced his later self-description as a 'conservative socialist', since his opposition to capitalism went alongside a suspicion of the Industrial Revolution and modernity in general, and a belief in the virtues of rural over urban life. He wrote of his anger about the 'injustice of class distinctions', believed in collectivism over private enterprise, and in later life wrote of his sympathy with striking coal miners. He also believed in democracy over totalitarianism, holding that "any form of collectivist government must also be democratic if it is to function properly", and expressing scepticism about the Bolshevik revolution in Russia.

Sharp was an opponent of capital punishment. He was not, however, a supporter of the Suffragette movement, although according to his colleague and biographer Maud Karpeles this probably reflected a disapproval of their methods rather than the principle. Despite this, he maintained a friendly relationship with his sister Evelyn, an avid suffragist who was imprisoned for her activities; after her release from Holloway she wrote to Sharp stating that she had no wish to quarrel over the matter, and that she did not believe he was a "confirmed 'anti'". Sharp was a nationalist, and believed that exposure to English folk song would engender a spirit of patriotism.

== Death ==
Sharp died of cancer of the upper respiratory system at Hampstead on 23 June 1924.

== Criticism ==
Sharp's ideas held sway for half a century after his death, thanks in part to an uncritical and rose-tinted biography co-authored by his disciple Maud Karpeles, who also enshrined his thinking in the 1954 definition of folk song drawn up by the International Folk Music Council. A. L. Lloyd, a Marxist and the chief theoretician of the second folk song revival during the 1960s, affected to repudiate Sharp's ideas but in fact followed much of his thinking. He rejected Sharp's claim that folk song could be found only in isolated rural communities as "primitive romanticism", and described his piano arrangements as "false and unrepresentative", but praised his ability as a collector, admired his analysis of modal tunes, and used numerous examples from his manuscripts as illustrations.

A more radical Marxist analysis was offered in the 1970s by David Harker, questioning the motivations and methods of folk revivalists, and accusing Sharp of having manipulated his research for ideological reasons. According to Harker:

"'[F]olk song' as mediated by Cecil Sharp, [is] to be used as 'raw material' or 'instrument', being extracted from a tiny fraction of the rural proletariat and... imposed upon town and country alike for the people's own good, not in its original form, but, suitably integrated into the Conservatoire curriculum, made the basis of nationalistic sentiments and bourgeois values."

Harker expanded this thesis in the influential Fakesong in 1985, dismissing the concept of folk song as "intellectual rubble which needs to be shifted so that building can begin again", and attacking scholars from Francis James Child to A. L. Lloyd. Folk song collecting, scholarship, and revival were viewed as forms of appropriation and exploitation by the bourgeoisie of the working class, and Sharp in particular was strongly criticised. An expert on printed broadsides, Harker argued against the oral tradition and maintained that most of what Sharp had termed "folk song" in fact originated from commercially produced print copies. He also claimed that Sharp and Marson had bowdlerised or otherwise tampered with the songs, making "hundreds of alterations, additions and omissions" in their published material.

Fakesong led to a widespread reappraisal of the work of Sharp and his colleagues. Michael Pickering concluded that: "Harker has provided a firm foundation for future work", while Vic Gammon commented that Fakesong had taken on "the status of an orthodoxy in some quarters of the British left", and represented "the beginning of critical work" on the early folk music movement - although he stated later that, "this does not mean that Harker got it all right."

A more critical analysis was offered by C. J. Bearman, who noted numerous statistical discrepancies in Harker's claims that Sharp and Marson's choices of songs for publication were unrepresentative: "It is an interesting variety of mistake which so consistently produces errors in favour of the argument being presented." Bearman also disputed Harker's claims of mass bowdlerisation, on grounds firstly of factual misrepresentation and exaggeration, secondly for ignoring constraints on publishing erotic material in the Edwardian era, and thirdly for omitting the fact that Sharp had been open about his edits and preserved the original texts. In another paper, Bearman disputed statistics from Somerset communities that had been employed by Harker to challenge the notion of a rural peasantry.

Harker's contention that much of the material collected by Sharp and others had its origins in commercial print is now widely accepted, however, and Sharp's narrow definition of what constituted "folk song" has been broadened considerably in more recent scholarship.

In 1993 Georgina Boyes produced her book The Imagined Village – Culture, ideology and the English Folk Revival, which critiqued the Victorian and Edwardian folk song revival for having invented a culturally anachronistic rural community – "The Folk" – and making unrepresentative collections of songs to support the idea. The book was also critical of Sharp's controlling tendencies, which some of his contemporaries complained about, and interpreted the power struggle with Mary Neal over control of the Morris dance movement in terms of a patriarchal refusal to share power with a woman. Roy Judge's accounts, however, apportion blame more even-handedly and stress their ideological disagreement. There has also been criticism of Sharp's attitude towards the social dance activist Elizabeth Burchenal in the USA.

Sharp's song collecting in the USA has also been the subject of controversy amongst American scholars of cultural politics. Henry Shapiro held him responsible in part for the perception of Appalachian mountain culture as "Anglo-Saxon", while Benjamin Filene and Daniel Walkowitz claimed that Sharp had neglected to collect fiddle tunes, hymns, recent compositions, and songs of African-American origin. David Whisnant made similar claims about his selectivity, but praised him for being "serious, industrious and uniformly gracious to and respectful of local people". More recently, Phil Jamison has stated that Sharp "was interested only in English music and dances. He ignored the rest". However, Brian Peters' detailed analysis of Sharp's collection identified a large number of American-made songs, plus hymns, fiddle tunes, and songs which Sharp himself described as having "negro" origins.

== Selected works ==
- Cecil Sharp's Collection of English Folk Songs, Oxford University Press, 1974; ISBN 0-19-313125-0.
- English folk songs from the southern Appalachians, collected by Cecil J. Sharp; comprising two hundred and seventy-four songs and ballads with nine hundred and sixty-eight tunes, including thirty-nine tunes contributed by Olive Dame Campbell, edited by Maud Karpeles. Oxford: Oxford University Press, 1932.
- English folk songs, collected and arranged with pianoforte accompaniment by Cecil J. Sharp, London: Novello (1916). This volume has been reprinted by Dover Publications under ISBN 0-486-23192-5 and is in print.
- English Folk Song: Some Conclusions (originally published 1907. London: Simpkin; Novello). This work has been reprinted several times. For the most recent (Charles River Books), see ISBN 0-85409-929-8.
- The Morris Book a History of Morris Dancing, With a Description of Eleven Dances as Performed by the Morris-Men of England by Cecil J. Sharp and Herbert C MacIlwaine, London: Novello (1907). Reprinted 2010, General Books; ISBN 1-153-71417-5.

== See also ==
- Country Dance and Song Society, an American folk arts organisation spun off from chapters of Sharp's English Folk Dance Society
- William Kimber
- Lucy White
- Jane Hicks Gentry
- Mary Neal
