= Benton Flippen =

American fiddler (1920–2011)

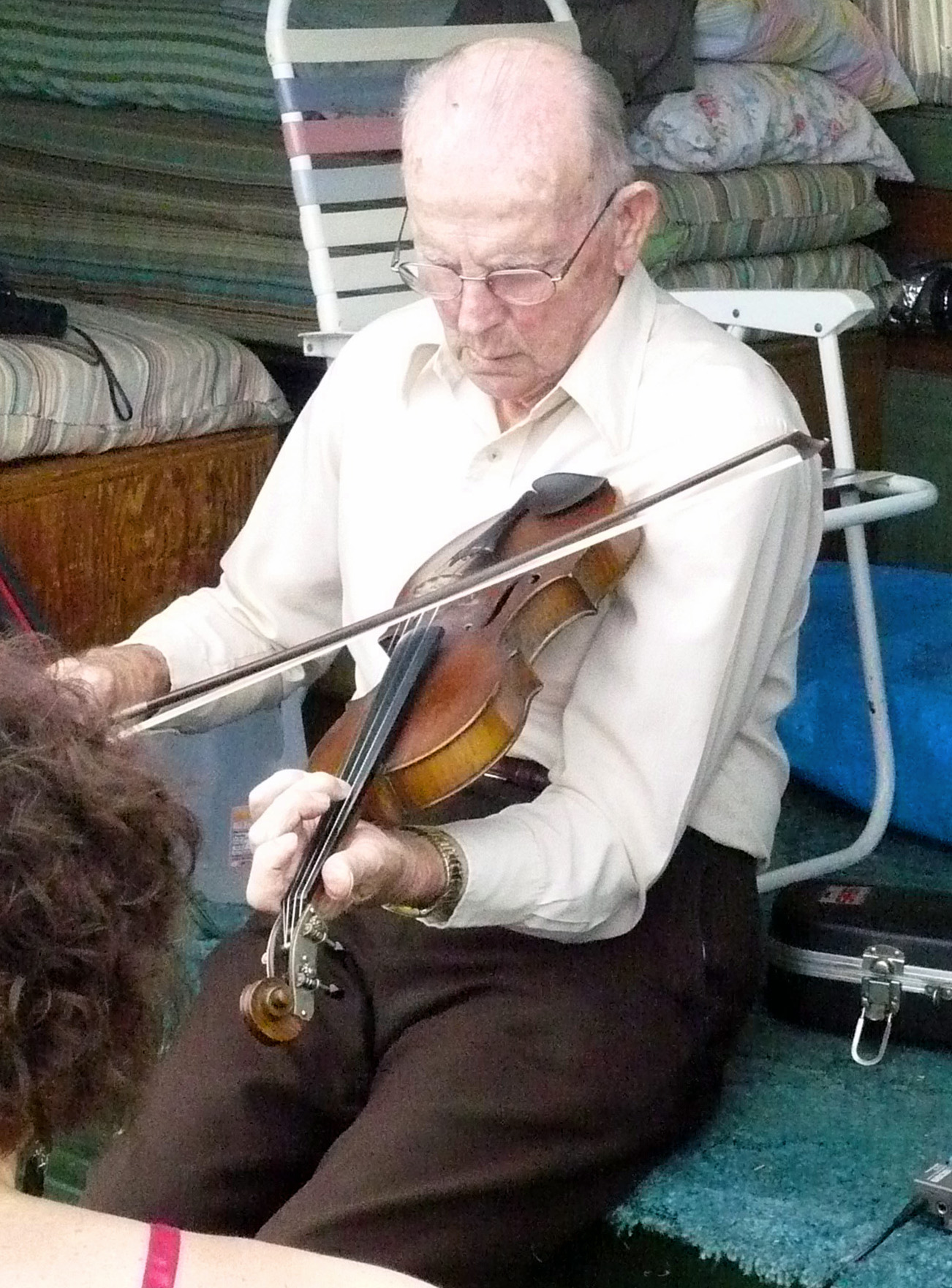
- Benton Flippen playing the fiddle in 2009

Background information
- Born: James Benton Flippen; July 18, 1920; Jacksonville, Florida, U.S.
- Died: June 28, 2011 (aged 90)
- Genres: Old-time; folk
- Instruments: fiddle, banjo

James Benton Flippen (July 18, 1920 – June 28, 2011) was an American old-time fiddler from Mount Airy, North Carolina. He was one of the last surviving members of a generation of performers born in the early 20th century playing in the Round Peak style centering on Surry County, North Carolina. His contemporaries included Tommy Jarrell, Fred Cockerham, Kyle Creed, and Earnest East.

Flippen learned to play old-time music early in life from his father, uncles, and brothers. He composed several original tunes and performed with the Camp Creek Boys and the Smokey Valley Boys.

Flippen was a recipient of the North Carolina Folk Heritage Award in 1990.

== Early life and career ==
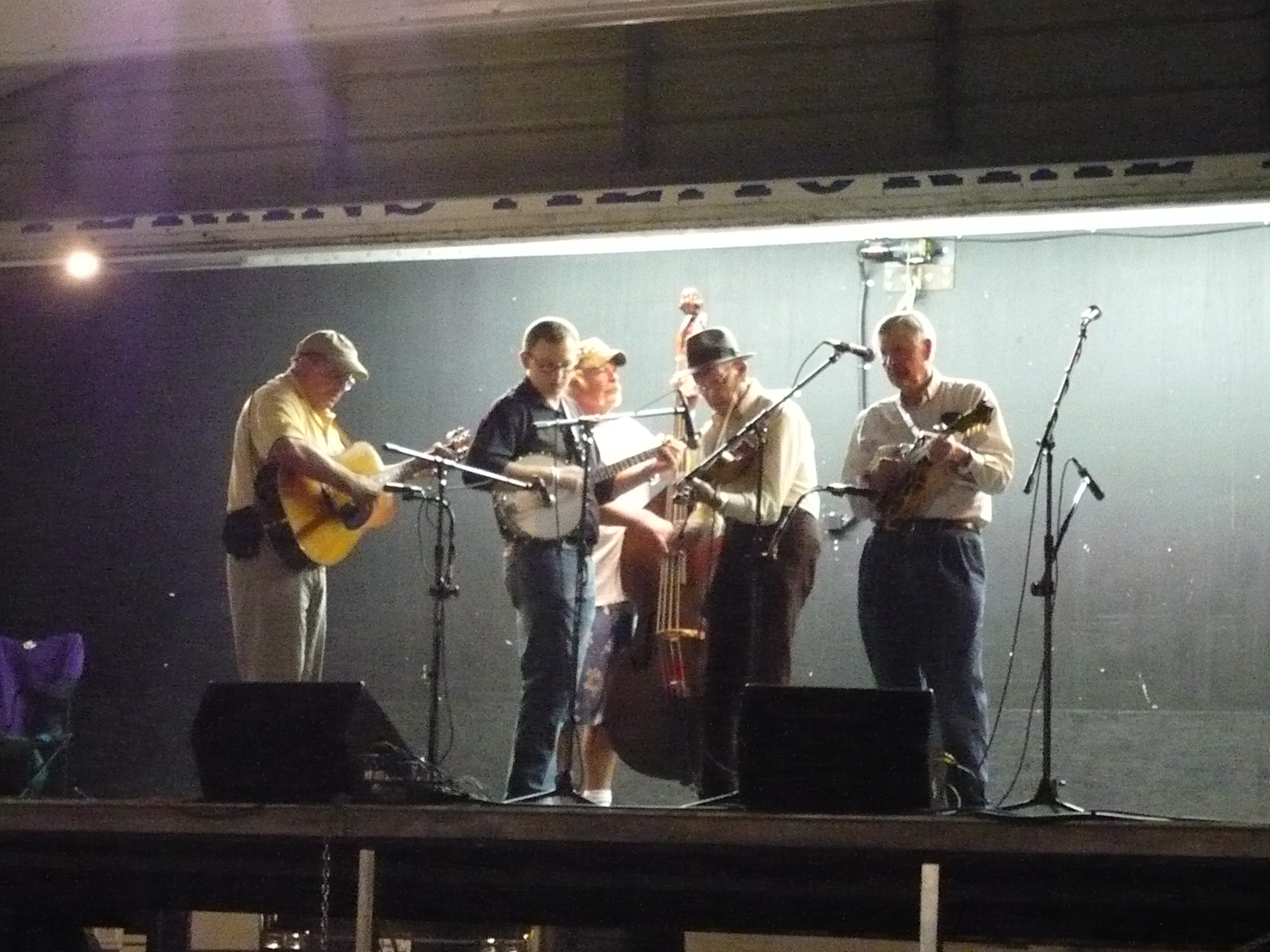
Benton Flippen performing in 2009 with the Smokey Valley Boys

Flippen was raised on a farm in Surry County, North Carolina, where he first played the banjo during his childhood. His father was an accomplished old time banjo picker, as were his uncles and brothers. During his youth he visited his fiddling uncle John Flippen, quickly turned to playing the fiddle and started playing with the area's noted bands and musicians, among them the Green Valley Boys led by Glenn McPeak, with Esker Hutchins and Leak Caudill. Esker became an important influence on Flippen's fiddling style, which included a heavy bow shuffle and bluesy notation.

In the late 1960s he was asked to fiddle with the Camp Creek Boys, after Fred Cockerham's departure. From the 1970s on, Flippen belonged to the Smokey Valley Boys, an outfit that preserved Flippen's unique musical abilities on recordings. The band also earned awards at numerous fiddling competitions, before disbanding in 1985. In 1990, the North Carolina Folk Heritage Awards honored Flippen, who was recognized for a unique style of string fingering. Flippen was also renowned for his original compositions, which include "Benton's Dream," "Fiddler's Reel," "Sally in the Turnip Patch," and "Smokey Valley Breakdown."

During his career, Flippen took first place numerous times in fiddle and band contests. He won seven times at the Old Fiddler's Convention in Galax, Virginia; three times at the Union Grove Old Time Fiddlers' Convention; and at the Mount Airy Fiddlers Convention, among many others. He also played at the Newport Folk Festival, the 1982 World's Fair in Knoxville, Tennessee, the Festival of American Fiddle Tunes, the Smithsonian Institution, the Library of Congress, the Appalachian String Band Music Festival in Clifftop, Fayette County, West Virginia, and many more highly esteemed venues. In 2008, at the age of 88, he headlined the Berkeley Old Time Music Convention in California.

In the late 1990s Flippen reorganized his Smokey Valley Boys with new and previous members. The later lineup of his band often included Frank Bode singing and playing guitar, William Flippen (Benton's grandson) on guitar, Kevin Fore playing banjo, Verlin Clifton on mandolin, and Andy Edmonds playing banjo and guitar.

== Style and technique ==
Flippen gained popularity among the old-time music community for his unique approach to fiddling. Having rather large hands, he discovered the best way to get around the neck was to slide his index and middle fingers, rather than fingering up and down the scale with all four fingers as most people do — including his mentor, Esker Hutchins. On some tunes, he slid up the neck with one finger as he nearly simultaneously slid down with another. Where most fiddlers make a "D" chord on the neck with the index and ring finger, Flippen did it with index and middle finger. His bowing was described as smooth and heavily shuffled, having been perfected over many years of playing for square dances. As Paul Brown describes in the liner notes to Old Time, New Times, "It cries the blues, shouts a spiritual message, resounds with the celebration of a square dance or house party. It's full of syncopation and stretch, yet solidly down-to-earth."

Flippen also had a unique two-finger banjo style. He said he found it difficult to play clawhammer banjo, and though he liked hearing it, the three-finger bluegrass style wasn't quite for him, so he came up with his own heavily syncopated two-finger picking style that combined drive and charm.

== Discography ==
- 1972 — The Smokey Valley Boys (Rounder Records)
- 1993 — Benton Flippen: Old Time, New Times (Rounder)
- 1997 — Smokey Valley Boys (Easterwood Recordings)
- 2004 — Beware of Dog (Heritage)
- 2005 — Fiddler's Dream (Music Maker)
- 2008 — An Evening at WPAQ, 1984 (5-String Productions)
- 2010 — 270 Haystack Rd. (Music Maker Relief Foundation)
