= Pet McKinney =

William Preston McKinney known as "Old Man" Pet McKinney (1846–1926) was an American Old Time fiddler and singer and civil war veteran from Round Peak, North Carolina. During the American Civil War he fought in the 45th Virginia Regiment. Later as an old man he was a well-known musician in the Round Peak. He influenced several musicians in the area, notably Tommy Jarrell whom he taught the tune Sail Away Ladies. His granddaughter Corinna Bowden was also a musician and a friend of Tommy Jarrell.
