= Pushin' Against a Stone =

Studio album by Valerie June
- Released: August 13, 2013
- Genre: Soul, alternative
- Length: 43:05
- Label: Sunday Best Recordings
- Producer: Kevin Augunas; Dan Auerbach

Valerie June chronology
Valerie June And The Tennessee Express (2010)	Pushin' Against a Stone (2013)	The Order of Time (2017)

Pushin' Against a Stone is the third album by American singer Valerie June. It was released on August 13, 2013 by Sunday Best Recordings label. The album was co-produced by The Black Keys' member Dan Auerbach and Kevin Augunas.

== Critical reception ==
Professional ratings
Aggregate scores
Source	Rating
Metacritic	81/100
Review scores
Source	Rating
Allmusic	3.5/5 stars
The Austin Chronicle	4/5 stars
Blurt	4/5 stars
Exclaim!	9/10
The Independent	5/5 stars
Mojo	4/5 stars
PopMatters	8/10
Q	3/5 stars
Rolling Stone	3.5/5 stars
Spin	8/10

Pushin' Against a Stone garnered critical acclaim from music critics. Metacritic assigned an averaged Metascore of fourteen selected mainstream critics to the album of an 81, meaning it has attracted "universal acclaim". The Independent's, Andy Gill rated the album a perfect five stars, and said her music defies classification, which makes her music so stimulating. Jason Schneider of Exclaim! rated the album nine out of ten, and noted this was "a rare case when a young artist's natural instincts are spot-on."

At Mojo, Lois Wilson rated the album four stars, and she felt the music could be perfectly called "'organic moonshine roots music'". Tom Speed of Blurt rated it the same, and affirmed the release as being "an impressive calling card to the rest of the world". At The Austin Chronicle, Doug Freeman rated it the same, and highlighted her vocal as being different but remarkable. Jem Aswad of Spin rated the album eight out of ten, and evoked that the music on the release comes from a place of "studied looseness that's never contrived, and it shows a poise and clarity of vision which her earlier efforts barely suggested." At PopMatters, Brent Faulkner rated it the same, and felt that the music might not be of the "innovative" kind; however, he claimed the music to be "a truly worthwhile alternative" from the copy-cat era we live in today.

Thom Jurek of Allmusic rated the album three-and-a-half stars, and affirmed that the music was rather long; however, he proclaimed the effort to be a "solid" one on which she "asks many questions". At Rolling Stone, Will Hermes rated the release the same, and said "Credit June's vinegary, slightly oddball vocals, equal parts Diana Ross and Dolly Parton, which guide each song like an old tractor retrofit with LED high beams: luminous, ancient, unstoppable." At Q, Rupert Howe provided the only mixed review at three stars, and noted how the outdated production was not good for the music; however, he did mention "There's little doubt, though, that June could work moonshine magic on anything she puts her voice to."

=== Accolades ===
Rolling Stone ranked the album at No. 44 on their "50 Best Albums of 2013" list, and highlighted how the album "mixed blues, soul, country, string-band folk and gospel", which it comes with a "sound of a rookie doing her own thing". American Songwriter ranked the album at No. 21 on their "American Songwriter’s Top 50 Albums Of 2013" list, and they wrote that June comes with an "arresting voice, veering from girl group to gospel to bluegrass to folk with ease", which they concluded with noting "If you haven't checked this album out yet, you're missing out."

Publication	Rank	List
American Songwriter	21	American Songwriter’s Top 50 Albums Of 2013
Rolling Stone	44	50 Best Albums of 2013

== Track listing ==
All tracks are written by Valerie June, except where noted.

No.	Title	Writer(s)	Length
1.	"Workin' Woman Blues"		3:09
2.	"Somebody to Love"		3:35
3.	"The Hour"	Dan Auerbach, June	3:52
4.	"Twined & Twisted"		3:14
5.	"Wanna Be on Your Mind"	Auerbach, June, Kevin Augunas	3:58
6.	"Tennessee Time"	Auerbach, June	3:15
7.	"Pushin' Against a Stone"	Auerbach, June, Augunas, Richard Swift	5:17
8.	"Trials, Troubles, Tribulations"	Estil C. Ball	3:05
9.	"You Can't Be Told"	Auerbach, June, Augunas	3:18
10.	"Shotgun"		3:09
11.	"On My Way"	Booker T. Jones; June	3:29
12.	"Somebody to Love" (acoustic version)		3:42
Total length:			43:03

== Charts ==
=== Weekly charts ===
Chart (2013)	Peak position
Belgian Albums (Ultratop Flanders)	26
Belgian Albums (Ultratop Wallonia)	56
Dutch Albums (Album Top 100)	34
French Albums (SNEP)	23
Swedish Albums (Sverigetopplistan)	51
Swiss Albums (Schweizer Hitparade)	29
US Billboard 200	41
US Digital Albums (Billboard)	22
US Top Rock Albums (Billboard)	8

=== Year-end charts ===
Chart (2013)	Position
Belgian Albums (Ultratop Flanders)	179
French Albums (SNEP)	185
