= O Death =

American folk song

Song
- Genre: Appalachian folk

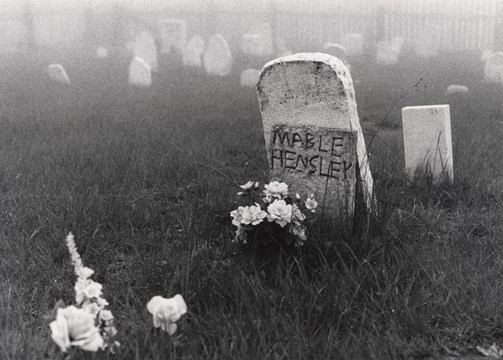
A graveyard in Virginia, displaying traditional Appalachian funerary decorations.

"O Death", also known as "O, Death", "Oh Death", "Conversations with Death", or "A Conversation with Death", is a traditional Appalachian folk song, listed as number 4933 in the Roud Folk Song Index. The song is generally attributed to the musician and Baptist preacher Lloyd Chandler, but it was likely taken or adapted from folk songs already existing in the region. The song has been covered in a variety of contexts, including films, video games, and television.

== Variants ==
The version as performed by Lloyd Chandler:

Oh what is this I cannot see
With icy hands gets a hold on me
Oh I am Death, none can excel
I open the doors of heaven and hell

A modified version with a chorus and different tune, performed by Dock Boggs, Nimrod Workman, Ralph Stanley and others:

Oh, Death
Whoa, Death
Won't you spare me over 'til another year?
Well what is this that I can't see?
With ice-cold hands taking hold of me
Well I am Death, none can excel
I'll open the door to Heaven or Hell

== Origin ==
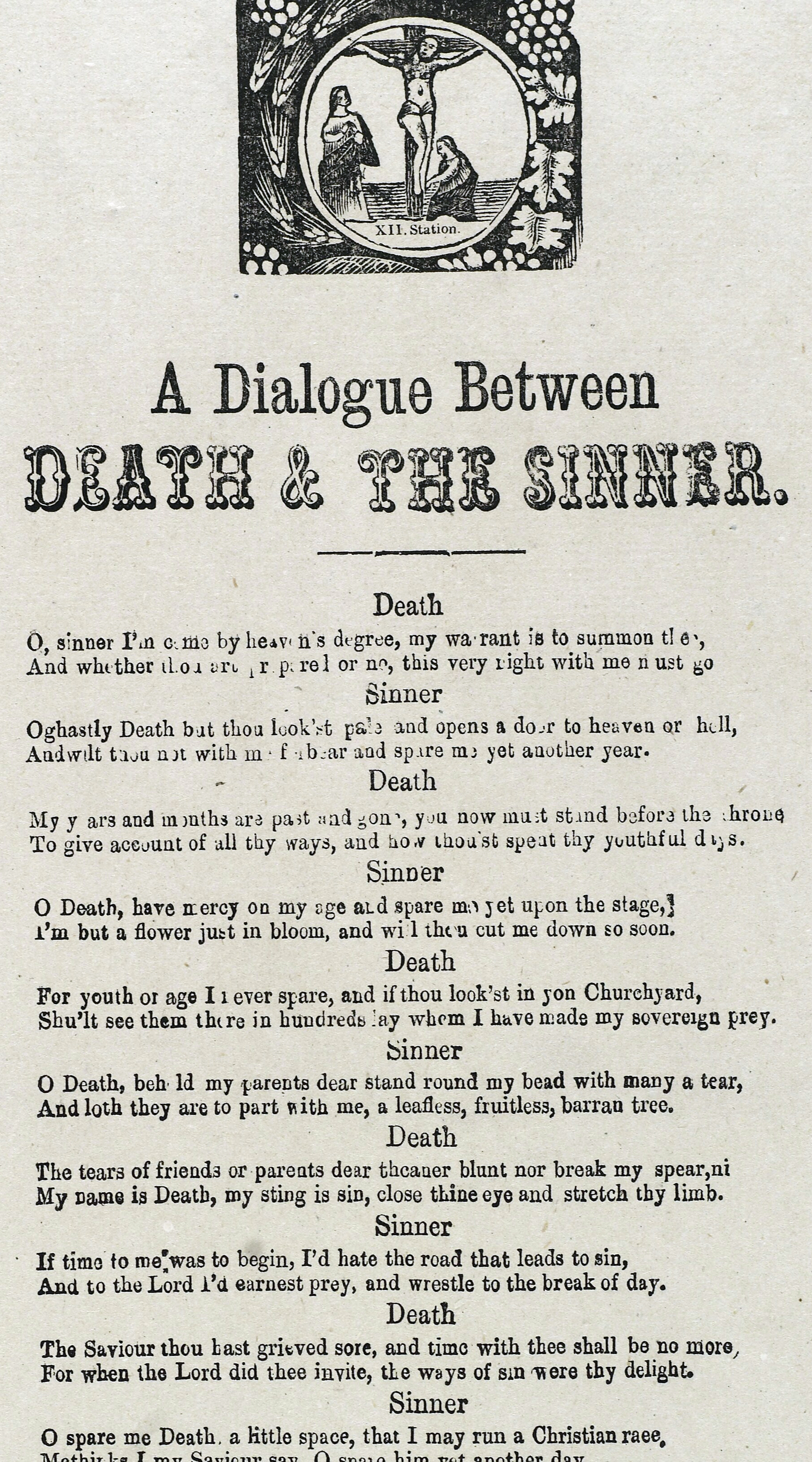
First line reads: Death/ O, sinner I'm come by heaven's decree, my warrant is to summon thee.

In 2004, the Journal of Folklore Research asserted that "O, Death" is Lloyd Chandler's song "A Conversation with Death", which Chandler performed in the 1920s while preaching in Appalachia. Chandler's daughter-in-law, Barbara, asserted that "O, Death" was based on Chandler's composition.

However, Chandler seems to have taken the song from another source or at least based it on an older version.

Encounters with a personified "Death" featured in traditional English songs which possibly date to the 14th century, including "Death and the Lady" (Roud 1031), which was found in the oral tradition in early twentieth century England. "O Death" bears a strong resemblance to a broadside ballad printed in Ireland in 1870, entitled "A Dialogue Between Death & the Sinner" (pictured).

In 1913, the Journal of American Folklore printed a version sung in 1908:

Sinner, I come to you by Hebbin's decree;

This very night you must go wid me.

O-o death! O-o death!

How kin I go wid you?

"Jes' like a flower in its bloom,

Why should you cut me down so soon?

O-o death! O-o death!

How kin I go wid you?

This version seems closer to the version first performed by Dock Boggs than Chandler's "original" version.

== Recordings ==
1920's Country blues banjo player Moran Lee "Dock" Boggs recorded the song in 1963 after his 'rediscovery' during the Folk Music Revival. A recording from the 1938 National Folk Festival in Washington, D.C. by an unknown singer is held by the Library of Congress. Various folk music artists included "O, Death" on musical collections throughout the 1970s and 1980s. It is sung in the 1976 Barbara Kopple documentary Harlan County, USA by early union activist and coal miner Nimrod Workman, a well known folk music singer from Mingo County, West Virginia. In the 1960s, Alan Lomax recorded the folk and gospel singer Bessie Jones singing "O Death".

Lloyd Chandler's recording of "A Conversation with Death" appears on Rounder Records 1975 release High Atmosphere: Ballads and Banjo Tunes from Virginia and North Carolina, a collection of recordings made by John Cohen.

Among the most famous recordings is Ralph Stanley's version in the 2000 Coen brothers film (and soundtrack album) O Brother, Where Art Thou?, for which Stanley won the Grammy Award for Best Male Country Vocal Performance in 2002. The soundtrack's producer, T-Bone Burnett, originally asked for a banjo rendition emulating Dock Boggs, but Stanley convinced him otherwise with an a cappella performance in the style of the Appalachian Primitive Baptist Universalist church. The song also appears in episode 7 of the second season of television series Fargo, inspired by another Coen brothers film of the same name. The version used in this episode was recorded by Shakey Graves with Monica Martin of Phox.

"O, Death" has appeared twice in American television series Supernatural, both times in connection with the show's personification of Death, portrayed by Julian Richings: the 2010 episode "Two Minutes to Midnight" featured a version by Jen Titus; Lisa Berry performed the song in character as Billie in the 2015 episode "Form and Void". The version sung by Vera Hall was featured in episode three of the first season of Altered Carbon, a Netflix original.

A version by Jeff Grace, performed by Amy Van Roekel, was featured in Until Dawn, a 2015 horror video game by Supermassive Games. The 2024 remake of the game attracted criticism for omitting the song. The song returned for Until Dawn's spiritual successor, the Dark Pictures Anthology, with a folk metal recording by the band Khemmis as part of the series intro and a unique recording over the outro of each of the four episodes. O Death was trademarked in 2022 as the name of the upcoming eighth and final Dark Pictures game.

A written version of the lyrics were included in a letter sent by Dennis Rader to KAKE-TV in 1978.

=== List of versions ===
- Vera Hall, as Death Have Mercy (1959)
- John Reedy, on Starday Records, (1961).
- Kaleidoscope, on Side Trips (1967).
- Camper Van Beethoven, with variant lyrics and melody, on Our Beloved Revolutionary Sweetheart (1988).
- Mike Seeger with the medieval ensemble Hesperus, on Crossing Over (1988).
- Faun Fables, on a reissue of Early Song (2004).
- Sam Amidon, on All is Well (2008).
- John Cygan as protagonist Silas Greaves in the video game Call of Juarez: Gunslinger (2013).
- Joshua Eustis (formerly of Telefon Tel Aviv), under the moniker "Sons of Magdalene" on Move to Pain (2014).
- Kate Mann, in Rattlesnake on the Road (2014).
- Gangstagrass, on Broken Hearts and Stolen Money (2014).
- A Hill to Die Upon recorded an extreme metal variant with harpist Timbre on Holy Despair (2014).
- English folk-rock band False Lights, on Salvor (2015).
- Amy van Roekel, for the video game Until Dawn (2015).
- Bitter End, on Illusions of Dominance (2015).
- Rising Appalachia with a spoken word interlude by Theresa Davis, on Wider Circles (2015).
- Americana musician Shakey Graves, on Fargo (2016)
- Diamanda Galás, on Guilty Guilty Guilty (2008), All the Way (2017), and At Saint Thomas the Apostle Harlem (2017).
- American metal band Khemmis recorded a doom metal version on a split EP with Spirit Adrift (2017) and for the video game series The Dark Pictures Anthology.
- Johanna Hevda, on Black Moon Lilith in Pisces in the 4th House (2021).
- Rhiannon Giddens feat. Francesco Turrisi, on They're Calling Me Home (2021).
- Jason Graves on the soundtrack for The Dark Pictures Anthology: The Devil in Me (2022).
- Witchouse 40k, on Ghostlands (2025).
- Sam Shackleton, on Scottish Cowboy Ballads & Early American Folk Songs (2025).
