= Flippen =

Flippen is a surname of Dutch origin. Notable people with the surname include:

- Benton Flippen (1920–2011), American old-time fiddler
- Hannah Flippen (born 1995), American softball player
- Jay C. Flippen (1899–1971), American actor
- Ruth Brooks Flippen (1921–1981), American screenwriter and television writer
- Samuel Flippen (1969–2006), American convicted murderer
- Scott Stapp (born Anthony Scott Flippen), American musician and songwriter
