= WPAQ =

Coordinates: 36°32′04″N 80°35′48″W

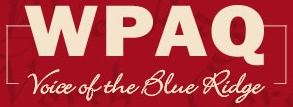
- Mount Airy, North Carolina; United States
- Broadcast area: Piedmont of North Carolina; Southwest Virginia; Southside Virginia
- Frequency: 740 kHz
- Branding: "WPAQ AM740"

Programming
- Format: Americana; bluegrass; classic country; southern gospel

Ownership
- Owner: WPAQ Radio, Inc.

History
- First air date: February 2, 1948; 78 years ago

Technical information
- Licensing authority: FCC
- Class: D
- Power: 10,000 watts days; 1,000 watts critical hours; 7 watts nights
- Translator: 106.7 W294CE (Mount Airy)

Links
- Public license information: Public file; LMS
- Webcast: Listen live
- Website: www.wpaq740.com

WPAQ (740 kHz) is a commercial radio station licensed to Mount Airy, North Carolina, serving the Piedmont area of North Carolina, Southwest Virginia and Southside Virginia. WPAQ is owned and operated by WPAQ Radio, Inc. It airs a mix of Americana, bluegrass, classic country and southern gospel music, along with some brokered Christian talk and teaching shows. The transmitter and studios are on Springs Road at Mount View Drive in Mount Airy.

By day, WPAQ is powered at 10,000 watts non-directional. As 740 AM is a clear channel frequency reserved for Class A station CFZM in Toronto, WPAQ must reduce power to 1,000 watts during critical hours and to 7 watts at night. Programming is also heard on 250-watt FM translator W294CE at 106.7 MHz.

== History ==
Ralph Epperson observed in 1948 that the popularity of old-time music was falling off, and one area radio station needed to take on the job of preserving it. As a child he enjoyed listening to distant AM radio stations, and in college he changed his major to radio technology. He worked for the United States Naval Research Laboratory before going into broadcasting, and he never dreamed he would own a radio station. But Epperson, his father, and cousin, literally built the new radio station, including the 305-foot tower still used over 65 years later. So much cursing took place that, according to Epperson, one minister said it would take a six-month revival meeting to make up for it. Fiddle player Benton Flippen helped dedicate the new studio February 1, 1948, the night before actual broadcasts began.

Epperson's "Merry Go-Round," which began airing on WPAQ in 1948, was the third-longest live-music show on radio in 1998 (The Grand Ole Opry was the longest-running). In the mid-1990s, the show moved to the Downtown Cinema. At one time, Epperson made recordings of the live performances to air later, and he continued to play these recordings in the 1990s on another show he hosted.

Epperson did pretty much everything, working as a DJ during the day, selling air time, repairing equipment, sometimes sleeping on a cot at the station before he got married.

Among the big names who played on WPAQ: Bill Monroe's brother Charlie Monroe, Grandpa Jones, Little Jimmy Dickens, Del Reeves, Ralph Stanley, Lester Flatt and Earl Scruggs, and Mac Wiseman. Among those local performers making appearances was Tommy Jarrell, a fiddle player from Surry County.

In the 1950s, WPAQ increased its power to 10,000 watts.

WPAQ has consistently aired Christian music and preaching with entirely a bluegrass and old-time music format, and big band music in the evenings from 6 p.m. until sundown. In addition to music, WPAQ offered local news, community announcements and obituaries. Live broadcasts aired on weekends, with performers waiting as long as six months to go on the air.

Paul Brown, who later became program director of WFDD, worked at WPAQ in the 1980s. He described his experience as "like walking into another era."

The Winston-Salem Journal article on the station's 50th anniversary described the studios this way:

Little has changed since Flippin [sic] and his players jammed in Epperson's studio that first night. The golden, 6-inch-thick pine doors built by Epperson's cousin to cloak the sound in the station's studios remain in place. Epperson still uses some of the same equipment he installed at the beginning -- black, hulking boxes of electronics with sturdy knobs and rounded, glass gauges.

Unlike other stations that changed to make money, WPAQ remained committed to its traditions.

In 1996, WPAQ took over WSYD, the other area AM station. Epperson and his wife Earlene owned WBRF in Galax, Virginia.

In 2005, the Surry Arts Council, using a grant from the North Carolina Arts Council, began working to preserve Epperson's extensive collection of recordings, including lacquered discs and reel-to-reel tapes. The recordings had been stored in boxes, but they were moved to a climate-controlled environment. Then, after an inventory, about 1,000 hours of recordings went to the University of North Carolina at Chapel Hill for cleaning and digital recording, which would allow transfer to compact discs and the Internet. The original recordings were moved to the Southern Folklife Collection.

In 2006, Epperson was inducted into the North Carolina Broadcasters Hall of Fame.

Epperson's death on May 31, 2006, led to rumors the station would make changes, but his son Kelly Epperson, who had taken over the station, did not plan to change—at least not what the station did. He did change how it was done. On April 5, 2007, which would have been Epperson's 86th birthday, WPAQ began streaming over the Internet—with Flippen playing his fiddle once again for the occasion—allowing the station to be heard all over the world. And responses came from all over the world. Streaming continued even after a significant increase in costs for royalties.

The station must power down to 7 watts at night to protect clear-channel stations, including CFZM in Toronto.
