= Devil's rope =

Devil's rope may refer to

- Devils Rope, a 2007 album by Kate Mann
- Barbed wire
- Cylindropuntia imbricata, Devil's rope cactus

== See also ==
- Devils Rope Barbed Wire Museum
