= Trials, Troubles, Tribulations =

American bluegrass gospel song by Estil C. Ball

Song
- Released: 1959
- Genre: bluegrass gospel
- Songwriter: Estil C. Ball

Trials, Troubles, Tribulations is a popular American bluegrass gospel song written by Estil C. Ball. It was originally entitled simply "Tribulations" and was recorded in 1959.

The song is the most famous composition written by E.C. Ball. The lyrics were based, as Ball told Alan Lomax in 1959, "on the last book in the Bible: Revelations [sic]." Original versions of Ball's song are featured on “White Spirituals”; “Sounds of the South”; and volume five in the Southern Journey series, “Deep South… Sacred and Sinful,” 1960 (Prestige). The song was reissued on “Southern Journey #6: Sheep, Sheep, Don’cha Know the Road” in the Alan Lomax Collection CD series, 1997 (Rounder). It is currently in print on “E.C. Ball and Orna: Through the Years” (Copper Creek) and "I'm Gonna Live Anyhow Until I Die," volume 5 in the "Alan Lomax's Southern Journey, 1959–1960" series (Mississippi Records / Global Jukebox).

The song has been frequently performed by other musicians, such as Andrew Bird as "Trials, Troubles, Tribulations." Most recently, the song appears on Valerie June's 2013 release, Pushin' Against a Stone.
