= Earnest East =

American folk musician (1916–2000)

Earnest East (July 8, 1916 - January 8, 2000) was a fiddle, guitar, and banjo player. East began his music career as a member of the Camp Creek Boys, and later founded his own instrumental band which he called the Pine Ridge Boys in 1966. In 1969, the Pine Ridge Boys released their first album, titled "Old Time Mountain Music", on the County label. Their second album, "Stringband Music From Mt. Airy" was released in 1981 on the Heritage label.

East received several folklore awards in his lifetime, including the Brown-Hudson Folklore Award from the North Carolina Folklore Society in 1988, and the North Carolina Folk Heritage Award in 1990.

== Early life ==
Earnest East was born July 8, 1916, in Surry County in North Carolina and spent much of his childhood learning about and playing music. Music played an integral part of East's childhood, from his own involvement with music, to his family's musical influence on the community. East's family was famous for holding a New Year's square dance and music party as part of the Breaking Up Christmas tradition, an event that persisted even after East's death.

As a child, East spent most of his time at legendary banjoist Charlie Lowe's home learning to read music and play the fiddle, banjo, and guitar. East drew music inspiration from the playing styles of popular recording artists at the time, including Fiddlin' Arthur Smith, learning to create a stronger driving sound by employing the entire length of his bow which became East's signature style. This style, which has been called "slip-chord" fiddling, describes East's ability to slide into a chord, a characteristic sound in his fiddling.

East joined the mountain string-band the Camp Creek Boys in the 1930s along with Kyle Creed (banjo), Fred Cockerham (fiddle/banjo), Paul Sutphin (guitar), Ronald Collins (guitar), Roscoe Russell (guitar), and Verlin Clifton (mandolin).

== Career ==
Following his short-lived involvement with the Camp Creek Boys, East founded the old-time string band the Pine Ridge Boys in 1966. The group included East's son, Scotty East on guitar, Gilmer Woodruff on banjo, and Mac Snow on guitar. Later, Scotty's wife, Patsy, joined the band on bass. While the group was largely instrumental, Scotty, Mac and Patsy were also singers. The group produced two albums :"Earnest East and the Pine Ridge Boys - Old-Time Mountain Music," which they released in 1969, and "Stringband Music From Mt. Airy", with banjoist Andy Cahan, in 1981. The group performed at many folk festivals including the Smithsonian Institution's Festival of American Folklife and the National Folk Festival, and was wildly popular in their home county of Surry.

In 1988, East received the Brown-Hudson Folklore Award from the North Carolina Folklore Society which honors individuals who contribute to the "appreciation, continuation, or study of North Carolina folk traditions" for his continuation of old-time folk music. In 1990, East received the North Carolina Folk Heritage Award, which honors North Carolina's most prominent folk artists.

Earnest East died on January 8, 2000. Since his death, Mac Snow has kept up East's family's tradition of the New Year's square dance. East's music has continued to be an important representation of folk, and an important contribution to the continuation of North Carolina folk traditions.
