= County Records =

American record label

- Founded: 1963
- Founder: David Freeman
- Defunct: 2018
- Distributors: County Sales (retail); Record Depot (wholesale)
- Genre: Old-time, bluegrass, country
- Country of origin: U.S.
- Location: Charlottesville, Virginia
- Official website: countysales.com

County Records was a Virginia-based independent American record label founded by David Freeman in 1963. The label specialised in old-time and traditional bluegrass music.

== History ==
Old-time music collector David Freeman started the County Records label in 1963 to focus on music from the rural Southeastern United States. He told an interviewer that he selected the name "County" because it evoked the rural, regional and local aspects of old-time music. Living in New York, Freeman avidly collected recordings from Southern musicians including old-time, bluegrass, country and blues artists. His new label's first release was a reissue of old-time music drawn from his personal collection of 78 rpm recordings from the 1920s and 1930s by Charlie Poole, the Leake County Revelers, Crockett's Mountaineers and similar string bands. A Collection of Mountain Fiddle Music (County 501) was released in 1964, and several similar reissues followed within the 500 series.

Around the same time, Freeman met Charles Faurot, an old-time banjo player from Chicago who was also living in New York. Faurot proposed that he make some new recordings of the old-time musicians who were still performing in Virginia and North Carolina. Freeman agreed, and Faurot traveled south to make field recordings of 15 artists. The first County Records release of new music was Clawhammer Banjo: Old Time Banjo and Fiddle Tunes (County 701) in 1965, recorded and produced by Faurot. This LP album included new recordings by Wade Ward, who had previously been recorded by John Lomax and Alan Lomax for the Library of Congress. The album was also the recording debut for fiddle and banjo players Fred Cockerham and Kyle Creed. Additional Faurot field recordings were released on More Clawhammer Banjo (Volume 2) (County 717) in 1969 and Clawhammer Banjo Volume 3 (County 757) in 1978. Faurot eventually recorded and produced more than a dozen of County Records' early releases, all numbered in the 700 series to indicate non-reissues.

County Records also expanded into the bluegrass music genre, although Freeman preferred those artists who stayed the closest to their old-time roots. The label's first bluegrass release was 1965's Blue Ridge Bluegrass (County 702) featuring Larry Richardson and the Blue Ridge Boys.

It was announced that County Records went out of business and permanently shut down on 17 January 2018 after over 50 years of operation.

== Related businesses ==
Freeman ran County Records as a sideline while working for the railway post office. In 1965, he started a companion business, County Sales, to provide a mail-order retail outlet for his County Records releases and other hard-to-find titles. This enabled him to quit the railway job and focus on music full-time. Both businesses operated from a single room in his father's printing business on East 37th Street in New York. In 1974 Freeman relocated his family, the record label and the distribution business to Floyd, Virginia. In 1977, he started a regional wholesale distribution business for old-time and bluegrass music, Record Depot, in Roanoke, Virginia. In 1978, Freeman helped his graphic artist Barry Poss start a new label in Durham, North Carolina called Sugar Hill Records. In contrast to County's focus on old-time and traditional bluegrass, Sugar Hill would specialize in the more modern and progressive bluegrass genres. In 1980, Freeman bought a pioneering bluegrass record label, Rebel Records, from Dick Freeland, one of the label's founders. Rebel's focus is mainstream bluegrass, somewhere between the traditional sound of County and the progressive sound of Sugar Hill.

== Awards ==
County Records founder David Freeman was inducted into the International Bluegrass Music Hall of Honor in 2002.

== Notable artists ==
- John Ashby
- Clarence Ashley
- Kenny Baker
- E.C. Ball
- Robert Byrd
- Gaither Carlton
- Carter Family
- Fred Cockerham
- Coon Creek Girls
- Kyle Creed
- Easter Brothers
- Foot Hill Boys
- Bill Grant and Delia Bell
- G. B. Grayson & Henry Whitter
- Bobby Hicks
- Tommy Jarrell
- Clark Kessinger
- Skillet Lickers
- Lilly Brothers & Don Stover
- Uncle Dave Macon
- Mac Martin & the Dixie Travelers
- Charlie Poole
- Larry Richardson
- Eck Robertson
- Russell Family
- Herschel Sizemore
- Matokie Slaughter
- Art Stamper
- Ernest Stoneman
- Benny Thomasson
- Wade Ward

== See also ==
- List of record labels
- Rebel Records
- David Freeman
