= Lloyd Chandler =

American folk musician

- Born: 1896
- Died: 1978 (aged 81–82)
- Genres: Appalachian music
- Occupation(s): Musician; Free Will Baptist preacher

Lloyd Chandler (1896–1978) was an American Appalachian Folk musician and Free Will Baptist preacher from Madison County, North Carolina.

Research has asserted that Chandler is the writer of "O, Death", a song featured on the acclaimed O Brother, Where Art Thou? soundtrack. Ralph Stanley won a Grammy Award for Best Male Country Vocal Performance for his rendition of this song.

Indiana University Press' The Journal of Folklore Research features articles in a 2004 issue asserting that "O, Death" is Chandler's song "A Conversation with Death", which he performed for several years while preaching in Appalachia.

One of the articles is from folklorist Carl Lindahl, who researched claims from Western North Carolina that O Brother's "O, Death" is Chandler's composition. The article states that Chandler authored the song after a vision from God in 1916. Lindahl also chronicles his unsuccessful research in trying to find any trace of the song before Chandler's version, debunking previous claims that the song traces back to a 16th-century British composition. The other article is from Chandler's daughter-in-law, Barbara, who asserts that "O, Death" was based on Chandler's composition.

"A Conversation with Death" appears on Rounder Records 1975 release High Atmosphere: Ballads and Banjo Tunes from Virginia and North Carolina, a collection of recordings made by John Cohen.

Lloyd Chandler was a cousin of the folk singer Dillard Chandler.

== Discography ==
- High Atmosphere: Ballads and Banjo Tunes from Virginia and North Carolina, Rounder Records, 1975
