= High Atmosphere =

Compilation album
- Released: 1975
- Recorded: 1965
- Genre: Old-time music
- Label: Rounder
- Producers: John Cohen, Mark Wilson

Professional ratings
Review scores
Source	Rating
Allmusic	4.5/5 stars

High Atmosphere: Ballads and Banjo Tunes from Virginia and North Carolina is a 1975 compilation album released by Rounder Records. The album is composed of Appalachian folk music recordings gathered by musicologist John Cohen in North Carolina and Virginia in 1965.

The album was originally released in 1975. In 1995, Rounder re-released the album with an additional twenty minutes of bonus tracks, and omission of the track 'Old Jimmy Sutton' played by Estil C. Ball & Wade Reedy from the original vinyl.

Indiana University Press' The Journal of Folklore Research has asserted that a Lloyd Chandler song on the album, "A Conversation With Death" was an early form of "O Death"—a song which Ralph Stanley won a Grammy Award for, featured on the O Brother, Where Art Thou soundtrack.

Burgin Mathews of Allmusic says the album is "one of the finest compilations of old-time field recordings available" and "should be of equal interest to academics, musicians, and the merely curious".

The alternative country group Uncle Tupelo's 1992 album March 16–20, 1992 includes three covers of songs from High Atmosphere. Jeff Tweedy is the vocalist on all of these cover versions.

== Track listing (1995 release) ==
Song	Artist
"Remember and Do Pray for Me"	Lloyd Chandler
"The Silk Merchant's Daughter"	Dellie Norton
"Rambling Hobo"	Gaither Carlton
"Apple, Blossom"	Gaither Carlton
"Pretty Crowling Chicken"	Frank Proffitt
"Forkey Deer"	Sidna Myers
"Satan, Your Kingdom Must Come Down"	Frank Proffitt
"Cumberland Gap"	George Landers
"Rolling Mills Are Burning Down"	George Landers
"Half Shaved"	Wade Ward
"Shady Grove"	Wade Ward
"Old Joe Clark"	Wade Ward
"Nitches Over the Hill"	Wade Ward
"Twin Sisters"	Sidna Myers
"Fortune"	Fred Cockerham
"Little Satchel"	Fred Cockerham
"Barker's Creek"	George Landers
"Young Emily"	Dellie Norton
"Early, Early in the Spring"	Dellie Norton
"Warfare"	Estil C. Ball
"Pretty Polly"	Estil C. Ball
"The Fox"	Estil C. Ball
"A Conversation with Death"	Lloyd Chandler
"I Wish My Baby Was Born"	Dillard Chandler
"The Carolina Lady"	Dillard Chandler
"The Scotland Man"	George Landers
"Alabama Girls"	Sidna Myers
"No Place Like Home"	George Landers
"June Apple"	Fred Cockerham
"Frankie Baker"	Fred Cockerham
"Jennie Jenkins"	Estil C. Ball, Orna Ball
"Little Sadie"	Gaither Carlton
"Cumberland Gap"	Frank Proffitt
