= The Order of Time (album) =

Studio album by Valerie June
- Released: March 10, 2017
- Studios: Guilford Sound; Brooklyn Recording; Seaside Lounge; Reservoir; Rayzor
- Genres: Americana; soul; blues; folk
- Length: 43:28
- Labels: Concord; Caroline
- Producer: Matt Marinelli

Valerie June chronology
Pushin' Against a Stone (2013)	The Order of Time (2017)

The Order of Time is the fourth full-length album by American singer and songwriter Valerie June. Produced by Matt Marinelli, it was released on March 10, 2017. "Astral Plane" and "Shakedown" are the lead singles of the album. The Order of Time was well received by critics and was included on several yearly best-of lists of albums.

== Background ==
According to Paste, Matt Marinelli was the third producer that June approached for The Order of Time. June and Marinelli met at the 2014 Newport Folk Festival, where June was performing and Marinelli was working as Norah Jones's road manager. June hired Marinelli as her own road manager and accompanist after she had found out that he formerly lived with her fiddler Mazz Swift.

"Astral Plane" and "Shakedown" are the lead singles of the album. "Shakedown" features vocals by June's father, who died in November 2016. She recalls her father in a few of the songs on the album.

June said that the title of the album means that it is "about life cycles and journeys". She recalled to The Globe and Mail that she met her new baby nephew for the first time, when she left the hospital in which her father died that night.

== Writing and recording ==
June had originally written around a hundred songs, as reported by Elle, and she narrowed them down to twelve that ended up on the album. June told Elle that Marinelli would refer to the hundred songs as "a freaking encyclopedia". According to MTV News, several of the songs on the album were sketched out in the early 2000s, while June was living in Memphis, Tennessee.

Recording took place in Brooklyn, Manhattan, Oregon, and Guilford, Vermont, all in 2015. A song was mixed at Exile Recording, Long Island City, New York, while all other songs were mixed at Guilford Sound, Guilford, Vermont. An overdubbing session took place during a holiday visit to June's family home in Tennessee.

== Critical reception ==
Professional ratings
Aggregate scores
Source	Rating
AnyDecentMusic?	7.8/10
Metacritic	89/100
Review scores
Source	Rating
AllMusic	4/5 stars
American Songwriter	3.5/5 stars
The Austin Chronicle	4/5 stars
Exclaim!	9/10
The Guardian	4/5 stars
The Independent	5/5 stars
Mojo	4/5 stars
PopMatters	9/10
Slant Magazine	4.5/5 stars
Uncut	8/10

The album was critically acclaimed. Review aggregator Metacritic assigned the album an averaged Metascore of 89 based on ten professional reviews, indicating a "universal acclaim".

The New Yorker's Hua Hsu was "captivated by the album's ethereal slowness", and wrote that it is "almost psychedelic wandering". Referring to the "spectral organ and densely layered acoustic guitars [guiding] songs like 'The Front Door', 'Two Hearts' and 'Astral Plane'", Jonathan Bernstein of the American Songwriter said that the "ethereal, contemplative and meandering narratives provide a counterbalance to the controlled catharsis of June's soul". The Guardian's Dave Simpson found the "gloriously ethereal atmosphere" of "Astral Plane" reminiscent of Van Morrison's Astral Weeks. Josh Hurst of Slant Magazine wrote, "[The] mingling of the earthbound and the otherworldly is crucial to the album, and June makes it sound like the most natural thing in the world."

June's songwriting also received praise. Emily Zimmerman of Exclaim! wrote that "her persona as a creator is both spellbinding and well versed in the ways of the world". In April 2017, Tom Ewing of Freaky Trigger named it his seventh favorite album of the year so far, calling it "[o]ak-aged Americana with cawing vocals".

=== Accolades ===
Rolling Stone ranked the album at No. 24 on their "50 Best Albums of 2017" list and at No. 3 on their "40 Best Country and Americana Albums of 2017" list, with Will Hermes of Rolling Stone saying that "June perfected her handsomely idiosyncratic brand of Americana", and calling "If And" and "Got Soul" the "headiest moments" of the album.

Jon Pareles of The New York Times ranked the album at No. 9 on his list of best pop albums of 2017. He wrote: "Rootsy, leisurely, genre-blurring Americana grooves roll along and evolve behind Valerie June’s assorted voices — nasal, clear, cracked, breathy — in songs with a casual, conversational surface."

The Order of Time was ranked No. 10 on Cosmopolitan's "The 10 Best Albums of 2017" list. Calling the album "maybe the most underrated gem of 2017", Eliza Thompson of Cosmopolitan wrote, "Whether she's a joyous hand-clapper as on 'Shakedown' or a dreamy balladeer as on 'Astral Plane', her voice is so mesmerizing you'll never want to stop listening."

In The Village Voice's Pazz & Jop, a poll regarding the best albums of the year as voted by more than 400 American music critics, The Order of Time tied with Laura Marling's Semper Femina at the 89th spot.

The album was included on the "Top 20 albums of 2017" list for The Sydney Morning Herald.

== Track listing ==
All tracks are written by Valerie June.

No.	Title	Length
1.	"Long Lonely Road"	3:56
2.	"Love You Once Made"	3:37
3.	"Shakedown"	2:46
4.	"If And"	3:30
5.	"Man Done Wrong"	3:06
6.	"The Front Door"	4:14
7.	"Astral Plane"	3:38
8.	"Just In Time"	3:50
9.	"With You"	2:42
10.	"Slip Slide On By"	4:04
11.	"Two Hearts"	3:53
12.	"Got Soul"	4:12
Total length:		43:28

== Personnel ==
- Peter Apfelbaum – tenor saxophone
- Steven Bernstein – alto horn, trumpet
- John Bollinger – drums, percussion
- Greg Calbi – mastering
- Clark Gayton – trombone
- Matthew Hall – assistant engineer
- Emerson Hockett – background vocals
- Jason Hockett – background vocals
- Patrick Hockett – background vocals
- Marika Hughes – cello
- Norah Jones – background vocals
- Aurélien Jubault – assistant engineer
- Valerie June – banjo, acoustic guitar, electric guitar, vocals
- Arthur Kell – double bass
- Dan Lead – pedal steel guitar
- Andy MacLeod – drums, twelve-string acoustic guitar, electric guitar
- Matt Marinelli – eight-string bass guitar, ARP synthesizer, bass guitar, engineer, acoustic guitar, electric guitar, mixing, percussion, piano, producer, sound treatment, vibraphone, xylophone
- Matt Marshall – A&R
- Nick Nagurka – assistant engineer
- Dan Rieser – drums, percussion
- Colin Stetson – contrabass clarinet, bass saxophone
- Daniel Stewart – assistant engineer
- Mazz Swift – drums, percussion, violin, background vocals
- Richard Swift – bass guitar, drums, engineer, keyboards, mixing, producer
- Andy Taub – engineer
- Adam Tilzer – assistant engineer
- Douglas Wielselman – clarinet, bass clarinet, horn arrangements, baritone saxophone
- James Yost – assistant engineer

== Charts ==
Chart (2017)	Peak position
US Billboard 200	111
US Americana/Folk Albums (Billboard)	5
US Indie Store Album Sales (Billboard)	6
US Top Rock Albums (Billboard)	20
US Digital Albums (Billboard)	25
US Top Album Sales (Billboard)	30
