= Owls, Omens and Oracles =

Studio album by Valerie June
- Released: April 11, 2025
- Genre: Americana
- Length: 47:17
- Label: Concord
- Producer: M. Ward

Valerie June chronology
The Moon and Stars: Prescriptions for Dreamers (2021)	Owls, Omens and Oracles (2025)

Singles from Owls, Omens and Oracles
- 1. "Joy, Joy!" Released: February 4, 2025

Owls, Omens and Oracles is the sixth studio album by American singer Valerie June. It was released on April 11, 2025, by Concord Records.

== Background ==
The album was produced by M. Ward and consists of fourteen songs, including the lead single, "Joy, Joy!", which was released on February 4, 2025, alongside a music video directed by Taylor Washington. The album incorporates elements of folk, blues, gospel, and soul, and features collaborators such as the Blind Boys of Alabama and Norah Jones.

== Reception ==
Professional ratings
Aggregate scores
Source	Rating
Metacritic	87/100
Review scores
Source	Rating
AllMusic	4.5/5 stars
Clash	9/10
The Guardian	4/5 stars
Mojo	4/5 stars
Paste	8.0/10
PopMatters	8/10
Uncut	8/10

In Metacritic, which assigns a weighted mean out of 100, the album got a 87, which indicates "universal acclaim", from 7 critic reviews.

Timothy Monger of AllMusic described Owls, Omens and Oracles as "a textured, grungy-sounding album, full of melody, soul, and inspired songwriting." The Guardian rated the album four out of five stars and stated "The Tennessee singer-songwriter's joyful new album pushes back against the bleakness of doomscrolling." Paste Magazine assigned it a rating of 8.0 out of ten, calling the album "a necessary reminder missing from swaths of contemporary music that happiness is just as potent a tool for beating back the darkness as anger."

== Track listing ==
All tracks are written by Valerie Hockett; "Superpower" written with DJ Cavem Moetavation.

Owls, Omens and Oracles track listing
No.	Title	Length
1.	"Joy, Joy!"	3:01
2.	"All I Really Wanna Do"	2:43
3.	"Endless Tree"	3:53
4.	"Inside Me"	2:22
5.	"Trust the Path"	4:33
6.	"Love Me Any Ole Way"	3:15
7.	"Changed" (featuring the Blind Boys of Alabama)	2:05
8.	"Superpower"	2:20
9.	"Sweet Things Just for You"	2:37
10.	"I Am in Love"	3:36
11.	"Calling My Spirit"	2:02
12.	"My Life Is a Country Song"	2:39
13.	"Missin' You (Yeh Yeh)"	3:26
14.	"Love and Let Go"	4:25
Total length:		47:17

== Personnel ==
Credits adapted from Tidal.

=== Musicians ===
- Valerie June – vocals (all tracks), acoustic guitar (tracks 1–7, 10, 12, 14), clapping (6), banjo (12)
- M. Ward – electric guitar (tracks 1–10, 12, 13), acoustic guitar (2, 3, 6, 9, 10, 12, 13); glockenspiel, piano (2); background vocals (6, 13), clapping (6), marimba (14)
- Kaveh Rastegar – bass guitar (tracks 1–10, 12, 14)
- Stephen Hodges – drums (tracks 1–10, 12, 14), percussion (1–4, 7, 12)
- Nate Walcott – string arrangement (tracks 1–3, 7, 8, 12), horn arrangement (1, 5–8, 14), keyboards (1), Hammond organ (2–4, 7, 8, 12), piano (2, 5–7, 10, 14), trumpet (5–8, 14), clapping (6)
- Vanessa Freebairn-Smith – cello (tracks 1–3, 7, 12)
- Luanne Homzy – viola, violin (tracks 1–3, 7, 12)
- Paul Cartwright – viola, violin (tracks 1–3, 7, 12)
- Zach Delanger – viola, violin (tracks 1–3, 7, 12)
- Sylvain Carton – baritone saxophone (tracks 1, 5–7, 14)
- Josh Johnson – tenor saxophone (tracks 1, 5–7, 14)
- Vikram Devasthali – trombone (tracks 1, 5–7, 14)
- The Blind Boys of Alabama – background vocals (track 7)
- DJ Cavem Moetavation – programming (track 8)
- Norah Jones – background vocals (track 9)

=== Technical ===
- M. Ward – production
- Greg Calbi – mastering
- Steve Fallone – mastering
- Kennie Takahashi – mixing (tracks 1–12, 14)
- Pierre de Reeder – mixing (track 13), engineering (all tracks)
- Case Newcomb – engineering (track 7)
- Jamie Landry – engineering (track 9)
- Dani Bennett Spragg – editing

== Charts ==
Chart performance for Owls, Omens and Oracles
Chart (2026)	Peak position
Greek Albums (IFPI)	33
