= Estil C. Ball =

American singer-songwriter

- Also known as: E. C. Ball
- Born: Estil Cortez Ball; October 1, 1913; Grayson County, Virginia
- Died: July 14, 1978 (aged 64) Mouth of Wilson, Virginia
- Instruments: vocals, guitar, banjo, fiddle

Estil Cortez Ball (1913–1978) was an American singer-songwriter, fingerstyle guitarist, and country gospel and folk musician from Rugby in Grayson County, Virginia.

== Career ==
From the mid-1950s until 1975, Ball performed with his wife Orna and their Friendly Gospel Singers in churches and on the radio, especially on WKSK (AM) in West Jefferson, North Carolina and WBOB in Galax, Virginia. Ball's first recordings were made by John A. Lomax on behalf of the Library of Congress at the 1937 Galax Fiddler's Convention in Galax, Virginia, where E.C. performed with his Rugby Gully Jumpers string band (named after Paul Warmack's Gully Jumpers). Lomax recorded the string band and several duets by E.C. and Orna. John's son Alan Lomax recorded Ball three years later, in 1941, at E.C.'s home in Rugby, Virginia, and there again in 1959.

County Records released Ball's first LP in 1967, as E.C. Ball and the Friendly Gospel Singers. Two more LPs followed in the 1970s on Rounder Records: E.C. Ball and Fathers Have A Home Sweet Home. Ball was also recorded by John Cohen for his 1975 compilation album High Atmosphere: Ballads and Banjo Tunes from Virginia and North Carolina.

E.C. Ball's most famous composition was a piece he called "Tribulations," based, as he told Alan Lomax in 1959, "on the last book in the Bible: Revelations [sic]." It has been frequently performed and recorded by other musicians as "Trials, Troubles, Tribulations."

Ball died in 1978 in Mouth of Wilson, and is buried at Corinth Baptist Church in Rugby, Grayson County, Virginia.

In December 2009, a tribute album was released entitled Face A Frowning World: An E.C. Ball Memorial Album, on the Tompkins Square label, produced by Nathan Salsburg. Singers interpreting songs from E.C.'s repertoire include Jolie Holland, Bonnie "Prince" Billy, Jon Langford, the Handsome Family, Rayna Gellert, and Catherine Irwin, among others.

== Discography ==
Year	Title	Label	Number	Notes
1967	E.C. Ball and the Friendly Gospel Singers	County	711	
1972	E.C. Ball	Rounder	0026	
1976	Fathers Have A Home Sweet Home	Rounder	0072	
1996	E.C. Ball	Rounder	11577	Reissue of Rounder 0026, plus 9 additional tracks
1999	E.C. Ball and Orna: Through the Years, 1937–1975	Copper Creek	0141	
