= The Gully Jumpers =

American Old-time string band

- Also known as: Paul Warmack and His Gully Jumpers
- Origin: Nashville, Tennessee, U.S.
- Genres: Old-time
- Years active: c. 1927–1966
- Label: Victor
- Past members: Paul Warmack; Charlie Arrington; William Roy Hardison; Burt Hutcherson

The Gully Jumpers were an American Old-time string band originally consisting of bandleader Paul Warmack (1889–1954) on mandolin, Charles Arrington (1893-1960) on fiddle, Burt Hutcherson (1893–1980) on guitar, and William Roy Hardison (1896–1966) on banjo. They were regular performers on the Grand Ole Opry in the late 1920s and are believed to have been the first group to release a record recorded in Nashville, Tennessee. Although their line-up changed over the years, the Gully Jumpers continued performing until the mid-1960s.

Warmack, the bandleader (the band was initially known as "Paul Warmack and His Gully Jumpers"), was born in Whites Creek in 1889 and was working as an automobile mechanic in Goodlettesville when he formed the Gully Jumpers around 1927. The band's name was suggested by Opry founder George D. Hay, who often gave the Opry's early string bands more colorful, rural-sounding names. In 1928, the Gully Jumpers were one of the Opry's most consistent acts, appearing on the show more times than any other group. That same year, they released the first record recorded in Nashville, which contained two tracks entitled "The Tennessee Waltz" (not to be confused with the more famous Pee Wee King song) and "Little Red Caboose Behind the Train." In October 1928, they recorded "Stone Rag", which was written by Humphrey Bate and His Possum Hunters fiddler Oscar Stone, and a tune entitled "Robertson County."

In spite of the losses of Warmack and Arrington, the Gully Jumpers continued performing on the Opry into the 1960s. Fellow Opry pioneers such as Sid Harkreader and Kirk McGee often stepped in to play fiddle for the band in place of Arrington. Hutcherson, who was the last surviving original member of the band when he died in 1980, was a pioneer of the finger-picked guitar style, and was cited as a key influence by long-time Opry guitarist Sam McGee and early Country music star "Mother Maybelle" Carter.

== Discography ==
- Nashville - The Early String Bands, Vol. 1 (County, 2000) — contains the tracks "Robertson County" and "Stone Rag"
