= Wade Ward =

American banjo player (1892–1971)

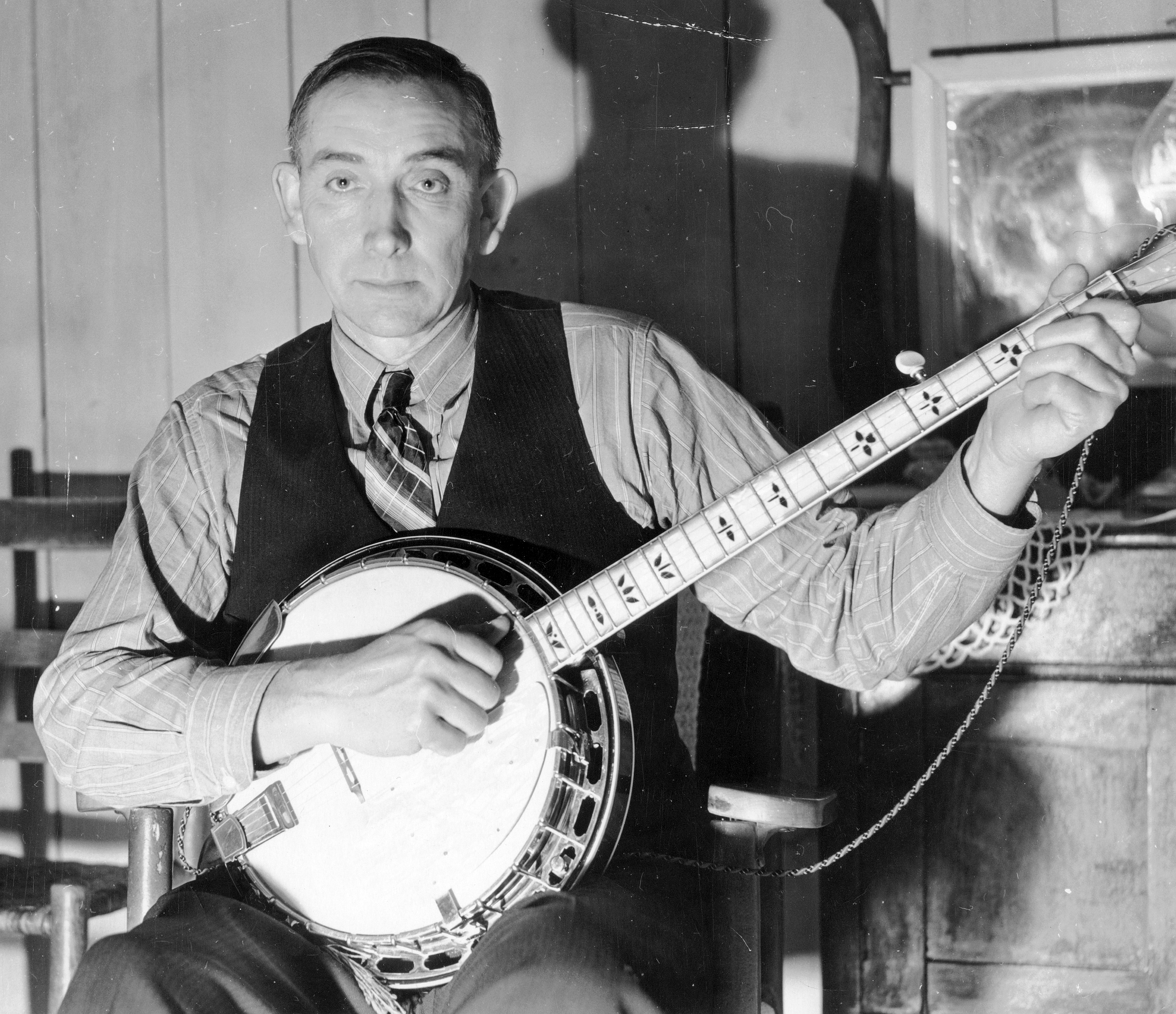
- Wade Ward in 1937 holding a 5-string banjo

Background information
- Also known as: Uncle Wade
- Born: Benjamin Wade Ward; October 15, 1892; Independence, Virginia, U.S.
- Died: May 29, 1971 (aged 78) Independence, Virginia, U.S.
- Genre: Old-time
- Occupation: Farmer
- Instruments: Banjo, fiddle
- Years active: 1919–late 1960s
- Labels: Okeh, Folkways, Biograph, FRC
- Formerly of: Buck Mountain Band

Benjamin Wade Ward, also known as “Uncle Wade,” (1892–1971) was an American old-time music banjo player and fiddler from Independence, Virginia. He was widely known playing the clawhammer banjo and frequently won the Galax, Virginia Old Time Fiddler's Convention. His instrument, a Gibson RB-11 5-string banjo, is now in the collection of the Smithsonian Institution. Along with Kyle Creed, Wade Ward is known for his 'Galax' style of playing the clawhammer banjo.

== Biography ==
Benjamin, "Uncle," Wade Ward was born in Independence Virginia on October 15th, 1892. Ward was an award winning clawhammer banjo player and won first place in the Galax, Virginia Old Time Fiddler's Convention eight times between the years and 1936 and 1968.

Ward began playing the banjo when he was 11 years old. His older brother, Davy Crockett Ward, who was 20 years his senior, taught him the skill. In addition to playing banjo, Ward also played fiddle. In August of 1913, Ward married Lelia Mathews. They had at least two children together before her death in 1951. He remarried in 1954 to Mollie Yates.

Ward began performing in public in 1919, at age 26. His first group, the Buck Mountain Band, included Van Edwards on fiddle and Van's son Earl on guitar. In 1925, Ward recorded four solo tunes (unreleased) for the Okeh label during a field recording session in Asheville, North Carolina. In October 1929 he and the Buck Mountain Band recorded four more tunes for Okeh in Richmond, Virginia, two of which were released. In addition to playing with the Buck Mountain Boys, Ward was employed by the Parsons Auction Company. He performed for their Saturday sales for 51 years.

In the early 1930s, Ward joined a band called the Ballard Branch Bogtrotters, formed by his older brother Crockett. Ward played banjo, Crockett and his neighbor Alec "Uncle Eck" Dunford played fiddles, Crockett's son Fields played guitar and sang, and the Wards' family doctor W. P. Davis managed the group and occasionally played autoharp. Folklorist John A. Lomax discovered the group in 1937 at the Galax Fiddlers' Convention and recorded them for the Library of Congress. John's son Alan Lomax recorded Wade in 1939, 1941, and again in 1959; nearly 200 recordings of Ward are archived at the Library of Congress' American Folklife Center. Other folklorists including Mike Seeger and Peter Hoover made additional field recordings in the 1950s and 1960s. The Bogtrotters appeared at festivals during the folk revivals of the 40s and 50s.

Despite his musical gifts, Ward made his living as a farmer. He died on May 29th, 1971 in Independence, Virginia, and is buried in the Saddle Creek Primitive Baptist Church Cemetery a few miles west of town.

== Discography ==
Year	Title	Label	Number	Notes
1929	"Don't Let the Blues Get You Down" / "Yodeling Blues"	Okeh	45428	78 rpm
1962	Music of Roscoe Holcomb and Wade Ward	Folkways	F-2363	
1968	Fields and Wade Ward: Country Music	Biograph	RC-6002	
1968	The Original Bog Trotters	Biograph	RC-6003	
1972	Uncle Wade - A Memorial To Wade Ward: Old Time Virginia Banjo Picker, 1892-1971	Folkways	F-2380	
2004	Uncle Charlie Higgins, Wade Ward & Dale Poe	Field Recorders' Collective	FRC-501	Recorded 1959
2007	Wade Ward: Banjo & Fiddle	Field Recorders' Collective	FRC-507	Recorded 1959–1961

- Many other recordings by Wade Ward have been released on compilation albums from Smithsonian Folkways, Biograph, Rounder, County and other labels.

== See also ==
- Alan Lomax
- Charlie Higgins
- Clawhammer
- High Atmosphere, 1975 Rounder Records compilation
- Old-time music
