= Kyle Creed =

American musician (1912–1982)

- Born: Andy Kyle Creed; September 20, 1912; Round Peak, North Carolina, U.S.A.
- Died: November 22, 1982 (aged 70)
- Genre: Old-time
- Occupations: Carpenter, Luthier
- Instruments: Banjo, fiddle
- Label: Mountain Records
- Formerly of: Camp Creek Boys

Kyle Creed (1912–1982) was an influential musician and banjo luthier of 20th century Appalachia. Along with Tommy Jarrell, and Fred Cockerham, he was a central figure of the Roundpeak-style old-time music that began to find an outside audience in the 1960s, and his clawhammer banjo playing came to shape banjo practices in the Old-time music tradition.

== Biography ==
He was born in the Round Peak area of Surry County, North Carolina on September 20, 1912, becoming immersed in the traditional music of the region from an early age. Creed was a multi-instrumentalist but concentrated on clawhammer banjo, playing in various groups such as the Camp Creek Boys and winning the prestigious Galax, VA Old Fiddler's Convention banjo competition in multiple consecutive years He also operated a music store and built banjos for other players of the style. His work as a luthier continues to influence preferences and standards in open back banjo construction and sound.

Particularly influential was Creed's novel practice of executing the right hand playing motion over the highest frets of the banjo fretboard as opposed to the standard method of striking the strings directly above the banjo head. Kyle Creed recorded individually and with the Camp Creek Boys and is included in the Library of Congress Archive of Folk Culture and the seminal County Records Clawhammer Banjo series.

He died November 26, 1982.

== See also ==
- Wade Ward
- Clawhammer
- Old-time music
