= David Freeman (music historian) =

American old-time music collector (1939–2023)

- Born: May 22, 1939; New York City, New York, U.S.
- Died: December 25, 2023 (aged 84)
- Occupations: Record label owner; music historian

David Freeman (May 22, 1939 – December 25, 2023) was an American collector, historian, and authority on old-time and bluegrass music. Freeman started the County Records label in 1963 in his native New York to focus on Southern string band music, and began the companion mail-order record retail company County Sales in 1965. He moved both businesses to Floyd, Virginia, in 1974. In 1977, Freeman started the Record Depot wholesale distribution company in Roanoke, Virginia, specializing in bluegrass and old-time music. In 1978 he helped his graphic artist Barry Poss start a bluegrass music record label, Sugar Hill Records, in Durham, North Carolina. In 1980, Freeman bought Charlottesville-based Rebel Records, a pioneering bluegrass label, from Charles Freeland, one of the label's founders. Freeman was inducted into the International Bluegrass Music Hall of Honor in 2002. Freeman died on December 25, 2023, at the age of 84.
