= Mount Airy Fiddlers Convention =

Coordinates: 36.5151°N 80.6181°W

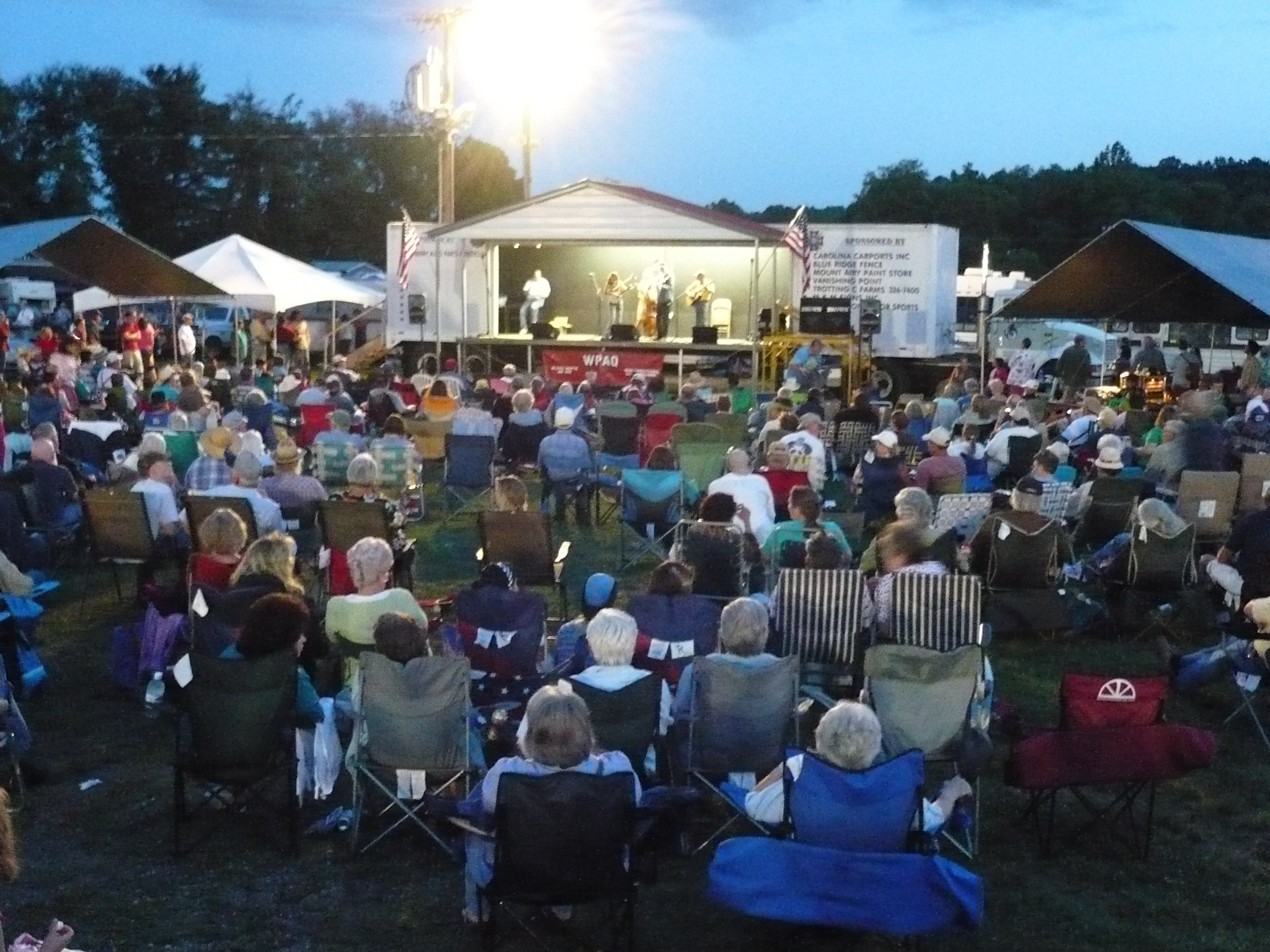
- An old-time band performing in the old-time band competition at the 2009 Mount Airy Fiddlers Convention
- Genre: Bluegrass music, old-time music
- Dates: First weekend in June
- Locations: Mount Airy, North Carolina, United States
- Years active: 1972-present
- Website: Official site

The Mount Airy Fiddlers Convention is a popular festival devoted to old-time and bluegrass music, as well as related arts such as dance, which takes place each summer at Veterans Memorial Park in Mount Airy, North Carolina, United States. It was established in 1972. It is held on the first weekend in June. The festival features numerous solo and band competitions, whose winners are awarded cash prizes.

Regular performers at the festival include Benton Flippen, the Carolina Chocolate Drops, and Ira Bernstein.

== See also ==
- List of bluegrass music festivals
