= Valerie June =

American musician (born 1982)

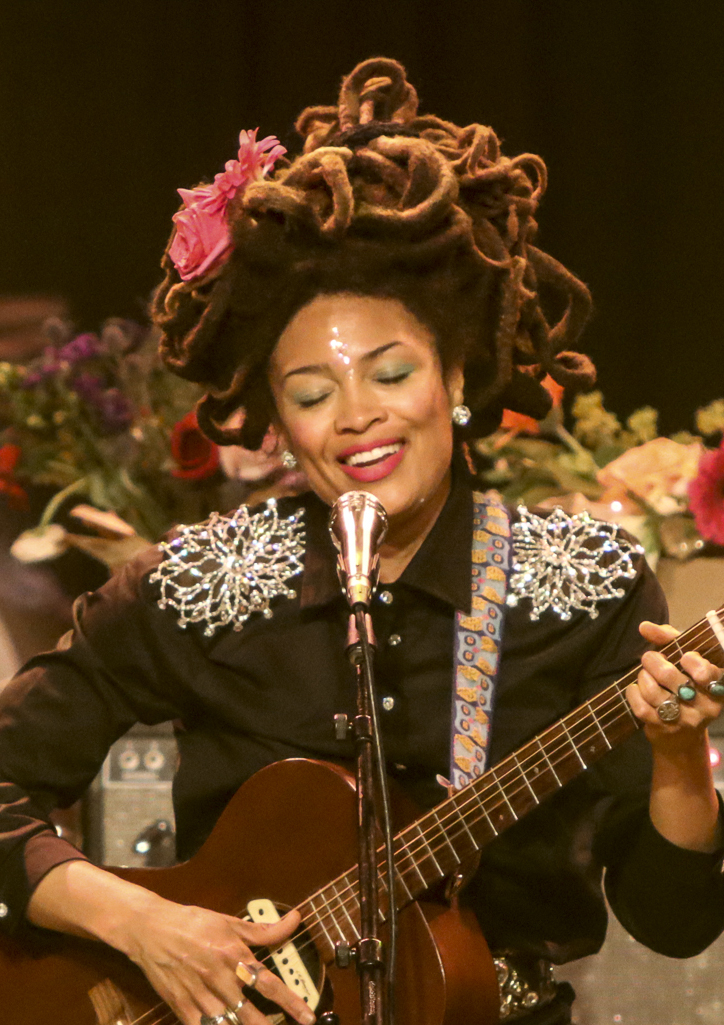
- Valerie June at the Fonda Theatre in Los Angeles in 2022

Background information
- Born: Valerie June Hockett; January 10, 1982 (age 44); Jackson, Tennessee, United States
- Origin: Humboldt, Tennessee, United states
- Genres: Americana, alternative, roots rock, folk, blues, soul, bluegrass, dream pop, indie rock
- Occupations: Singer, songwriter, multi-instrumentalist
- Instruments: Guitar, banjo, ukulele
- Years active: Early 2000s–present
- Label: Concord Records
- Website: www.valeriejune.com

Valerie June Hockett (born January 10, 1982) is a Grammy-nominated American singer, songwriter, multi-instrumentalist, and author. Her music draws influence from many genres, including psychedelic folk, indie rock, Appalachian, bluegrass, country soul, symphonic pop, and blues, as well as from her southern roots and later East coast life. She is signed to Concord Music Group worldwide.

== Early life ==
Born in Jackson, Tennessee, on January 10, 1982, June is the second of five children. As a child growing up in Humboldt, she was exposed to gospel music at her local church and R&B and soul music via her father, Emerson Hockett. As a teenager, her first job was with her father, owner of Hockett Construction in West Tennessee, and a part-time promoter for gospel singers and Prince, K-Ci & JoJo, and Bobby Womack. She helped by hanging posters in town. Her father died in 2016.

== Musical career ==
=== 2000–2009: Career beginnings ===
June relocated to Memphis in 2000 and began recording and performing at the age of 19, in the duo Bella Sun. After her marriage ended, she began working as a solo artist, combining blues, gospel and Appalachian folk in a style that she describes as "organic moonshine roots music", and learning guitar, banjo, and lap-steel guitar. She became associated with the Memphis-based Broken String Collective.

In 2009 she was a featured artist on MTV's online series $5 Cover (following the lives of Memphis musicians attempting to make ends meet), and in 2010 she recorded the EP Valerie June and the Tennessee Express, a collaboration with Old Crow Medicine Show.

=== 2010–2015: Pushin' Against a Stone and touring ===
In 2011, she was honored by the Memphis and Shelby County Music Commission at the Emissaries of Memphis Music event. She raised funds to record an album with producer Craig Street via Kickstarter.com, raising $15,000 in 60 days. Later that year she relocated from Memphis to Williamsburg, Brooklyn. Shortly after, record producer Kevin Augunas introduced June to Dan Auerbach of The Black Keys, which led to the recording of June's album Pushin' Against a Stone in July 2011, which was co-written and produced by Dan Auerbach and Kevin Augunas.

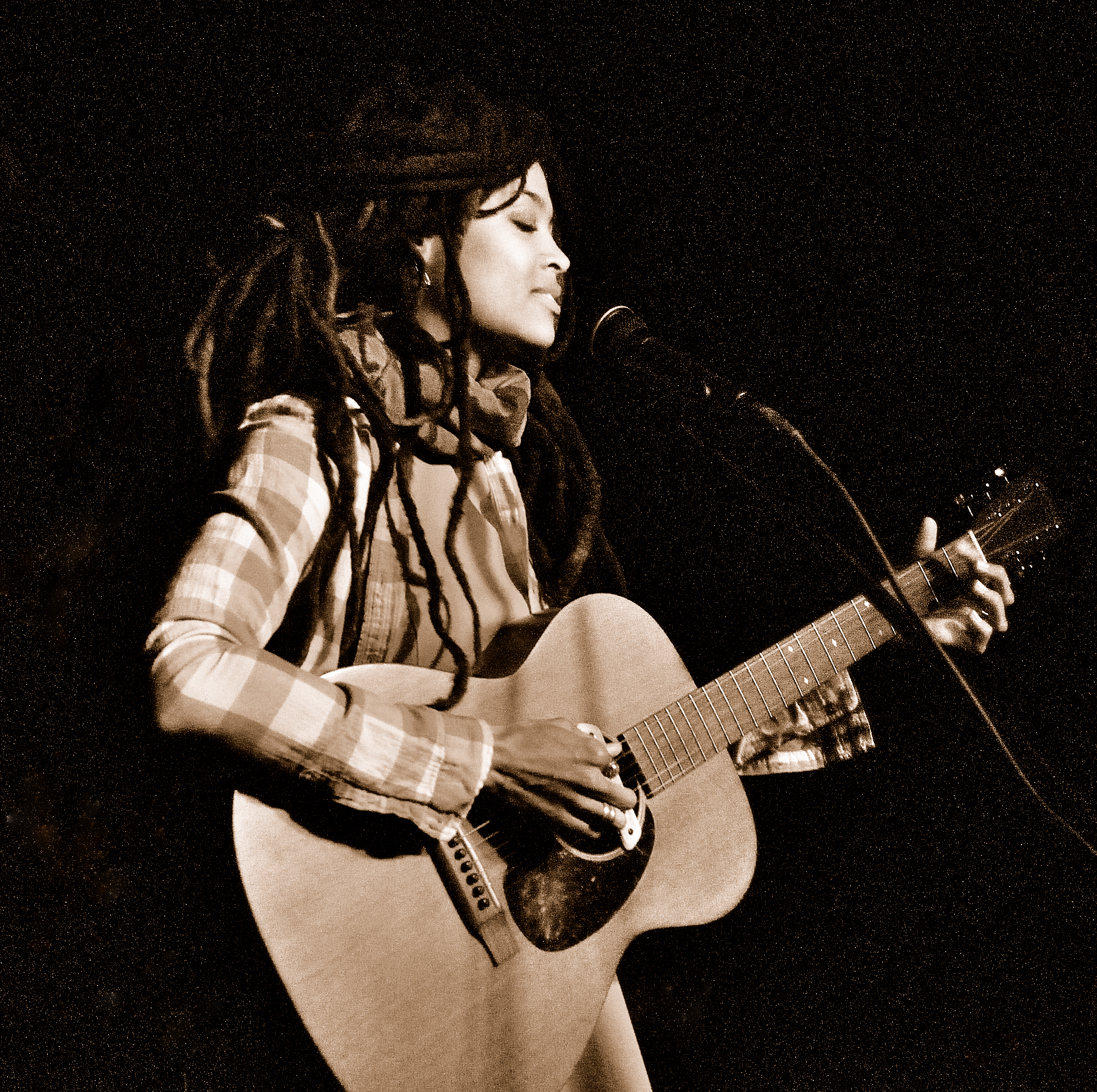
June performing at the Blind Pig in Ann Arbor, Michigan, in 2013

In 2012, June performed with producer John Forté on a collaboration called Water Suites (on the hip-hop-blues song "Give Me Water"), and with Meshell Ndegeocello on the song "Be My Husband". She contributed The Wandering's 2012 album Go on Now, You Can't Stay Here: Mississippi Folk Music Volume III. In 2012 she performed in the United Kingdom for the first time, playing at Bestival and appearing on Later... with Jools Holland.

She has received substantial radio play in Europe on BBC Radio 6, including a feature on Cerys on 6 with Cerys Matthews. Mary Anne Hobbs of XFM has said of June: "This woman has already touched my heart, she really, really has."

In February 2013, June was invited to support Jake Bugg on the UK leg of his tour. In March 2013, June performed two nights at South By Southwest. The first performance was on March 14 as part of the Heartbreaker Banquet. On March 16, June performed again, this time as part of The Revival Tour.

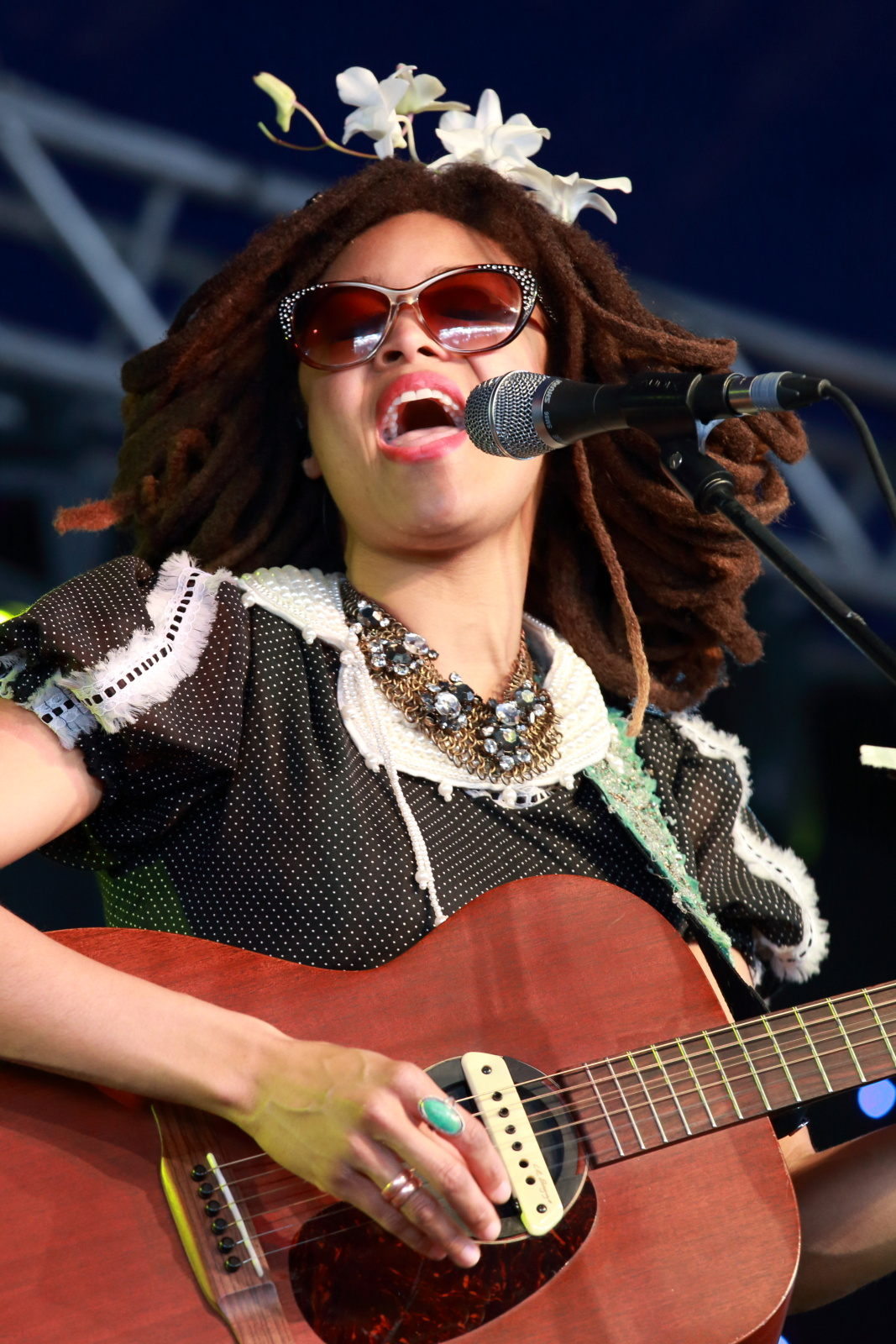
June performing at Byron Bay Bluesfest, 2014

After self-releasing three albums, her debut album as a signed artist, Pushin' Against a Stone, was released in the UK and Europe through Sunday Best Recordings on May 6, 2013, and through Concord Music Group in August 2013. The album includes several songs co-written with Dan Auerbach of The Black Keys, who co-produced it with Kevin Augunas. The album was so titled to commemorate the story of her life. June said: "I feel I've spent my life pushing against a stone. And the jobs I've had have been fitting for getting a true feel for how the traditional artists I loved came home after a hard day to sit on the porch and play tunes until bedtime." The record includes performances by Booker T. Jones, who co-wrote one of the songs contained on the album. The track "Workin' Woman Blues" was produced and engineered by Peter Sabák in Budapest. June has described the recording of the song as "magical" as it was completed in approximately 30 minutes. The two singles released in the UK and Europe were "Workin' Woman Blues" and "You Can't Be Told".

In 2014, June was nominated for a Blues Music Award in the Best New Artist Debut category for Pushin' Against a Stone. She appeared on Austin City Limits in 2014.

=== 2017: The Order of Time ===
Rolling Stone listed June's second album, The Order of Time, as one of the 50 Best Albums of 2017, citing "her handsomely idiosyncratic brand of Americana, steeped deep in electric blues and old-time folk, gilded in country twang and gospel yearning....a blend of spacey hippie soul, blues and folk with June's pinched, modern-Appalachian voice at the center".

In a 2017 interview, Bob Dylan was asked what artists he listened to and respected; June was among the artists he mentioned in reply.

=== 2020–2021: The Moon and Stars: Prescriptions for Dreamers ===
In 2020, June released a three-track digital release, Stay / Stay Meditation / You And I, songs she co-produced with Jack Splash. The songs were set to appear on her next studio album.

On January 22, 2021, June announced her album The Moon and Stars: Prescriptions for Dreamers, which was accompanied with the release of a new single from the album, "Call Me a Fool", featuring Carla Thomas. The video for "Call Me a Fool" was released on YouTube. To support the upcoming album, June made several live appearances on shows including CBS This Morning, Late Night with Seth Meyers, The Kelly Clarkson Show and Jimmy Kimmel Live!. In February 2021, June made her third appearance on KEXP; however, due to the COVID-19 pandemic, the performance was recorded from her home.

The Moon and Stars: Prescriptions for Dreamers was released on March 12, 2021, through Fantasy Records. The record was co-produced by Jack Splash and written by June. The album received critical acclaim, and was awarded a score of 85/100 on Metacritic, based on 10 critics' reviews. Pitchfork described the album as her "most heavy-hearted" and "far-reaching" record, and praised June for exploring themes of "love and loss" throughout the album. The album The Moon and Stars: Prescriptions for Dreamers ranked No. 3 on the Top 100 Americana Radio Airplay Albums of 2021, as reported by the Americana Radio Airplay Albums Chart (powered by CDX) for the period of January 11, 2021, through December 14, 2021.

In November 2021, June received a Grammy nomination for Best American Roots Song for "Call Me a Fool", featuring Carla Thomas.

Apple featured June's song "You And I" in their 2021 Christmas holiday ad.

=== From 2022 to present ===
In June 2024, June appeared on Celebrity Family Feud alongside The War and Treaty and Earth, Wind & Fire. In the same year, she appeared as a guest on The Kelly Clarkson Show, where she discussed her music and latest projects. In September, she was featured in the premiere of Austin City Limits' 9th Annual Hall of Fame Honors, celebrating the legacy of John Prine.

In June 2024, June tapped Carla Thomas for the song "Friendship," which honors the Stax Music Academy legacy and celebrates Mavis Staples' 85th birthday.

In February, June announced her upcoming album, Owls, Omens and Oracles, with the release of the single "Joy Joy".

In 2023, June contributed a rendition of "Strange Things Happening Every Day" to the documentary Little Richard: I Am Everything. The song was featured on the film's official soundtrack.

== Live performances ==
Since 2013, June has performed between 50 and 100 live shows annually worldwide. In 2013, she opened for The Rolling Stones at BST Hyde Park in London. From 2017 to 2023, she was featured in major festivals and shared the stage with artists such as Willie Nelson, Neil Young, Jack Johnson, Brandi Carlile, Sturgill Simpson, Gary Clark Jr., and John Prine.

In 2023, she toured with Dave Matthews at The Gorge Amphitheater and performed at the Newport Folk Festival alongside Floyd from The Muppets. In 2024, she was a guest performer on Tyler Childers' tour and performed with Trevor Hall at Red Rocks Amphitheatre.

June has had extensive radio experience, including appearances on NPR's All Things Considered, First Listen, World Café, Fresh Air, and Mountain Stage, as well as BBC programs such as Loose Ends, Bob Howard's Program, and Woman's Hour. She has also been featured on shows like E-Town Radio, Elton John's Rocket Hour, KCRW's Morning Becomes Eclectic, and Sirius XM Outlaw Country Live at Willie Nelson's Luck Reunion.

== Orchestral and songwriting contributions ==
June's songwriting contributions include "High Note," which she wrote for Mavis Staples' 2016 album Livin' on a High Note, and "Train Fare," featured on the Blind Boys of Alabama's 2017 album Almost Home.

In 2018, she performed with the Baltimore Symphony Orchestra, followed by a performance with the RTÉ Concert Orchestra in Cork City, Ireland, in 2019.

== Written work ==
=== Maps for the Modern World ===
June completed a book that was released in April 2021 under her full name, Valerie June Hockett. Maps for the Modern World (Andrews McMeel) contains poems, artwork, and homilies that speak on ideas such as consciousness and mindfulness. Memphis Magazine said that the book makes it "official and indisputable" that June "is a poet".

=== Somebody to Love: The Story of Valerie June's Sweet Little Baby Banjolele ===
In 2022, June published Somebody to Love: The Story of Valerie June's Sweet Little Baby Banjolele through Third Man Books. The children's book tells the story behind her song "Somebody to Love," inspired by her own experiences with a cherished banjolele.

=== Light Beams: A Workbook for Being Your Badass Self ===
In 2023, June released Light Beams: A Workbook for Being Your Badass Self through Andrews McMeel. The interactive journal features essays, poetry, and writing prompts designed to encourage self-reflection, creativity, and personal growth.

== Discography ==
=== Albums ===
Album	Details	Peak positions									Certifications
Album	Details	US	US sales	BEL (Fl)	BEL (Wa)	FRA	NED	SWE	SWI	UK	Certifications
The Way of the Weeping Willow	Released: 2006; Label: Self-released; Formats: CD, digital download	—	—	—	—	—	—	—	—	—	
Mountain of Rose Quartz	Released: 2008; Label: Self-released; Formats: CD, digital download	—	—	—	—	—	—	—	—	—	
Pushin' Against a Stone	Released: August 13, 2013; Label: Sunday Best Recordings; Formats: CD, LP, digital download	41	—	26	56	23	34	51	29	56	US: 66,000
The Order of Time	Released: March 10, 2017; Label: Concord Records, Caroline Records; Formats: CD, LP, digital download	111	30	44	100	90	99	—	38	—	
The Moon and Stars: Prescriptions for Dreamers	Released: March 12, 2021; Label: Fantasy Records; Formats: CD, LP, digital download	—	56	—	—	—	—	—	41	—	
Owls, Omens and Oracles	Released: April 11, 2025; Label: Concord Records; Formats: CD, LP, digital download	—	—	—	—	—	—	—	—	—	

=== EPs ===
Title	Details
Valerie June and the Tennessee Express	Released: April 24, 2010; Label: Self-released; Formats: CD, digital download
Stay / Stay Meditation / You and I	Released: November 13, 2020; Label: Fantasy Records; Formats: Digital download
Under Cover	Released: August 26, 2022; Label: June Tunes Music; Formats: Digital download

=== Singles ===
Year	Single	Peak positions			Album
Year	Single	US AAA	BEL (Fl) Tip	FRA	Album
2012	"Workin' Woman Blues"	—	63	127	Pushin' Against a Stone
2012	"You Can't Be Told"	—	—	94	Pushin' Against a Stone
2017	"Astral Plane"	—	—	—	The Order of Time
2017	"Shakedown"	20	—	—	The Order of Time
2020	"Stay"	—	—	—	The Moon and Stars: Prescriptions for Dreamers
2020	"You and I"	—	—	—	The Moon and Stars: Prescriptions for Dreamers
2021	"Call Me a Fool" (featuring Carla Thomas)	24	—	—	The Moon and Stars: Prescriptions for Dreamers
2021	"Why the Bright Stars Glow"	—	—	—	The Moon and Stars: Prescriptions for Dreamers
2021	"Fallin'"	—	—	—	The Moon and Stars: Prescriptions for Dreamers
2025	"Joy, Joy!	32	—	—	Owls, Omens and Oracles
"—" denotes single that did not chart or was not released in that territory.

=== With Bella Sun ===
- No Crystal Stair (2004), Bella Sun Music

=== TV and film ===
Year	Title	Notes
2006	Eat	Actress
2009	MTV's $5 Cover Amplified Documentary	Emmy Award-winning documentary
2012	Big Easy Express	"This Train is Bound for Glory"
2011	MusicBox Project of Americana Women	"Workin' Woman Blues"
2011	Let's Stay Together	
2012	VH1's Big Morning Buzz Live	Episode 845 - "Can't Be Told"
2012	78 Project web series	
2013	Catfish	Season 2 - "Twined and Twisted"
2013	Rachael Ray Show	Performance
2013	CBS Saturday Morning	
2013	NPR Tiny Desk	
2013	Late Show with David Letterman	
2013	The Tonight Show with Jay Leno	
2013	The Originals	
2013	CBS Saturday Sessions	"Workin' Woman Blues"
2014	Who Owns Water	"Twined and Twisted", "Workin' Woman Blues"
2014	No Cameras Allowed	"This Train is Bound for Glory"
2014	Qu'est-ce qu'on a fait au Bon Dieu?	"The Hour Won't Tell You No Lies"
2014	Austin City Limits	
2015	The Legend of Lead Belly	"Workin' Woman Blues"
2015	Lila and Eve	"The Hour Won't Tell You No Lies"
2015	BBC Global Beats Americana	Part One
2015	Smithsonian Center for Folklife and Cultural Heritage	Leadbelly documentary
2015	Suits	Episode #3013 - "Wanna Be On Your Mind"
2015	Grace and Frankie	Season 4 - "Pushin' Against a Stone"
2016	J'ai tout donné au soleil, sauf mon ombre	
2016	Two Trains Running	Grammy-nominated blues music documentary
2016	Reel South	"Man Done Wrong"
2017	Beauty and the Beast	2016–2017 season - "Wanna Be On Your Mind"
2017	CBS Saturday Sessions	"Got Soul"
2017	CBS Saturday Sessions	"Astral Plane"
2017	Une saison en France	"You Can't Be Told"
2017	PBS NewsHour	
2017	CBS This Morning Saturday	
2017	Queen Sugar	Season 2 (OWN Network) - "Shake Down", "The Front Door"
2017	Transparent	Season 4 - "Long Lonely Road", "Slip Slide On By"
2017	The Passage	Season 1 (Fox) - "Astral Plane"
2018	American Woman	"Workin' Woman Blues"
2018	Casual	Episode 110 - "Somebody to Love"
2018	Queen America	"Long Lonely Road"
2018	Little Woods	"Workin' Woman Blues"
2018	Queen America	"Workin' Woman Blues"
2018	TN Tourism Spotlight Stories Series	
2019	Bluff City Law	NBC, Season 1 - "Shotgun"
2019	Grounded in Memphis Mindfulness Arts Collective	Film score for Me & The Light to fight gun violence
2019	BBC Stewart Copeland Music Documentary	
2019	PBS Reel South	Documentary series, host of Season 4
2019	SMILF	Season 2 (Showtime) - "Love Told a Lie"
2019	Pearson	USA Network, Season 1 - "Man Done Wrong"
2021	TED Countdown	"Astral Plane"
2020	P-Valley	Season 1 (Lionsgate) - "If And"
2020	A Secret Love	"With You"
2021	CBS Saturday Morning: Saturday Sessions	"Two Roads, You and I"
2021	National Geographic's Earth Day Eve Celebration	"Home Inside"
2021	Legacies	CW, Season 3 - "Call Me a Fool" (feat. Carla Thomas)
2021	Grand Ole Opry Debut	
2021	Apple Holiday Ad	"You and I"
2021	Americana Music Honors and Awards	Ryman Auditorium featuring Carla Thomas
2021	Late Night with Seth Meyers	"Call Me a Fool" (feat. Carla Thomas)
2021–2022	True South	Season 3 - "Pushin' Against a Stone", "Workin' Woman Blues", "Long Lonely Road", "Man Done Wrong"
2022	Truth Be Told	Season 3 (Apple) - "Call Me a Fool" (feat. Carla Thomas)
2022	American Idol	ABC - Season 5 - "Smile"
2022	Jimmy Kimmel Live	Season 19 - "Smile"
2022	P-Valley	Season 2 (Starz) - "Stay", "Star Dust Scattering"
2022	A Love Song	"Slip Slide On By"
2022	For Love & Country	Documentary for Amazon Music
2023	GetTV Variety Specials	Season 2 - "This Train is Bound for Glory"
2023	TrueSouth	Season 5, Madisonville, TN episode - "Can't Be Told", "Somebody to Love"
2023	Black Cake	Season 1 (Hulu)
2023	Good Ol Girl	"Somebody to Love"
2023	PBS The Picture Taker	Ernest Withers documentary
2023	PBS Southern Sounds	
2023	Little Richard: I Am Everything	Emmy Award-winning, Grammy-nominated documentary
2024	Dreams in Nightmares	"Pushin' Against a Stone"
2024	Celebrity Family Feud	With Steve Harvey, The War and Treaty, and Earth, Wind & Fire
2024	The Kelly Clarkson Show	
2024	ACL 9th Annual Hall of Fame Honors John Prine	Premiere

== Awards and nominations ==
Year	Award	Category	Result	Reference
2021	Grammy Awards	Best American Roots Song	Nominated	
2021	Americana Music Honors & Awards	Album of the Year	Nominated	
2021	Americana Music Honors & Awards	Song of the Year	Nominated	
2018	Humboldt Hall of Fame	Induction	Inducted	
2014	Blues Music Awards	Best New Artist Debut	Nominated	
2014	Americana Music Honors & Awards	Emerging Act of the Year	Nominated	
2014	Independent Music Awards	Singer-Songwriter of the Year	Nominated	
2014	Independent Music Awards	Best Blues Song	Nominated	
2014	A2IM Libera Awards	Breakthrough Artist of the Year	Nominated	
2013	American Country Music Awards	Eric Church's nationally televised duet	Featured	
2013	Q Awards	Best New Act	Nominated	
2013	Starbucks	Pick of the Week (US & Canada)	Selected	
2011	Memphis and Shelby County Music Commission	Emissaries of Memphis Music Award	Received	
2010	Kickstarter Recording Campaign	Raised $15,000 in 60 days for Pushin' Against a Stone	Achieved	
2009	Emmy Award	$5 Cover Amplified Documentary	Featured	
