= Round Peak, North Carolina =

Unincorporated community in North Carolina, US

Coordinates: 36°30′47″N 80°47′13″W

Round Peak is an unincorporated community in Surry County, North Carolina, United States, near Mount Airy with an elevation of 1,280 feet. It is located in the southern Appalachian Mountains and gives its name to the Round Peak style of old-time music practiced in the area.

The community of Round Peak is named for the nearby summit of Round Peak which has an elevation of 2,094 feet (Powell 1968, p. 427). Popular attractions include the Round Peak Vineyards, part of the Yadkin Valley wine region.

== Music ==
Round Peak style is one variation of music drawing on Anglo-Celtic fiddle and African banjo music, known as "old-time" or mountain string band music. It is said to hold a distinct sound produced by performers including Charlie Lowe, Tommy Jarrell, and Fred Cockerham who helped popularize the style in the 20th century. Round Peak differs from other types of old-time by incorporating banjo "with syncopated rhythms made by drop thumbs and the melodic nature of noting." The area hosts the Mount Airy Fiddlers Convention and the W. L. Eury Appalachian Collection at Appalachian State University houses research materials on Round Peak old time music.
