= Kate Mann =

American musician

- Origin: Portland, Oregon, United States
- Genres: Americana, Roots
- Instruments: Guitar, flute
- Years active: 1995-present
- Label: Orange Dress
- Website: www.katemann.com

Kate Mann is an American musician currently based in Taos, New Mexico. She is originally from the Sandia Mountains in New Mexico but moved west as a young adult to pursue a career in music, then moved back in 2011.

== Biography ==
She was a high school teacher until 2005 when she embarked on music full-time. She toured the Western United States in a van and played her mother's old 1963 Gibson acoustic guitar. Mann plays the rhythmic guitar (self taught), banjo, whistles and sings.

She performs in the Northern New Mexico/Southern Colorado region and has for several years worked in a duo with Mark Dudrow. Mann is a songwriter and they include these originals together with covers and traditional fiddle music in their performances.

When asked how to describe her music she said, "Fits best under the label Americana, but I like to call it Desert Gypsy Rock."

Ariana Kramer in her article in Taos News writes,

Mann's music is influenced by "singing cowboys, heartache, '80s hair bands, old rock and roll, troubadours, bourbon, travelers, gentle souls ..." or so says

== Awards ==
2009 nominated for the 7th Annual Independent Music Awards for Americana Song of the year Cowboys are My Weakness

2009 finalist New Folk competition at the Kerrville Folk Festival

2010 honorable mention International Song Writing Competition : Americana Bird in my House

== Discography ==
=== 2006: November Songs ===
Mann released her debut album, November Songs, in 2005. The album is a live recording done in a single weekend. Accompanied by Bernardo Gomez (McKinley, Latin Quarter) on upright bass, Mann doing the vocals and guitar work on each song.

=== 2007: Devil's Rope ===
Mann's second album, Devils Rope, was released in 2007 and was co produced by Kate Mann and Rob Stroup.

=== 2008: Things Look Different When the Sun Goes Down ===
Things Look Different When the Sun Goes Down, Mann's third album, was recorded at 8-Ball Studio in Portland, Oregon co produced by Mann and studio owner Rob Stroup.

=== 2012: Rattlesnakes on the Road ===
Rattlesnakes on the Road, is Mann's fourth album. There are 13 songs all written and performed by Mann.

=== 2017: Mark Dudrow and Kate Mann ===
Mark Dudrow is a classical cellist. He and Mann have been working as a duo for a number of years. For this release "the duo recorded this album live in five hours at Willie Hunton's Earthship Studios in El Prado, New Mexico".
