= Fred Cockerham =

- Born: 3 November 1905
- Origin: North Carolina, United States
- Died: 8 July 1980 (aged 74)
- Genres: American folk
- Instrument(s): Fiddle, banjo

Fred Cockerham (3 November 1905 - July 8, 1980) was an American fiddle and banjo player of American folk music.

Cockerham was one of the seven children of Elias and Betty Jane Cockerham in North Carolina. He was one of the most accomplished of all the Round Peak, North Carolina musicians but is most commonly known for being the banjo accompanist to Tommy Jarrell. He played the fiddle in a more modern style than Jarrell, but played the fretless banjo in an old clawhammer style much like that of his old mentor, Charley Lowe.

== Discography ==
Year	Title	Label	Number	Notes
1965	Clawhammer Banjo: Old Time Banjo and Fiddle Tunes	County	701	reissued on County CD 2716, Clawhammer Banjo Vol 1 (2002) with extra tracks
1968	Down to the Cider Mill	County	713	with Tommy Jarrell & Oscar Jenkins. This and the two below LPs were reissued with the exception of several tracks on 2 County CDs - 2734 & 2735 (2004)
1970	Back Home in the Blue Ridge	County	723	
1973	Stay All Night and Don't Go Home	County	741	
1975	High Atmosphere: Ballads and Banjo Tunes from Virginia and North Carolina	Rounder	0028	recorded by John Cohen in 1965, reissued on Rounder CD 028 (1995) with 11 additional tracks
1976	Music from Round Peak	Heritage	10	with Tommy Jarrell, Mac Snow et al.
1978	Under the Double Eagle	Snowflake	103	Fred's solo fiddle album
1978	Southern Clawhammer	Kicking Mule	KM 213	several solo banjo tracks recorded by Ray Alden
1992	Best Fiddle-Banjo Duets	County	CD 2702	with Tommy Jarrell, duets now on the 2 County CDs 2734-2735 plus field recordings from the collection of Ray Alden & Dave Spilkia (out-of-print)
2004	Fred Cockerham	Field Recorders' Collective	FRC 101	recorded by Ray Alden
2008	Round Peak Volume 1	Field Recorders' Collective	FRC 109	recorded by Ray Alden
2008	Round Peak Volume 2	Field Recorders' Collective	FRC 110	recorded by Ray Alden
