= Tommy Jarrell =

American musician (1901–1985)

- Born: Thomas Jefferson Jarrell; March 1, 1901; Surry County, North Carolina, U.S.
- Died: January 28, 1985 (aged 83) Mount Airy, North Carolina, U.S.
- Genres: Old Time American
- Occupations: Musician, singer
- Instruments: Fiddle, Banjo, Vocals

Thomas Jefferson Jarrell (March 1, 1901 – January 28, 1985) was an American fiddler, banjo player, and singer from the Mount Airy region of North Carolina's Appalachian Mountains.

== Biography ==
He was born in Surry County, North Carolina, United States. Although he made his living from road construction (operating a motor grader for the North Carolina Highway Department until his retirement in 1966), Jarrell was an influential musician, eventually attracting attention from Washington D.C. when he received the National Endowment for the Arts' National Heritage Fellowship in 1982. That year's fellowships were the first bestowed by the NEA, and are considered the United States government's highest honor in the folk and traditional arts.

Jarrell's style was notable for its expressive use of syncopation and sliding ornamentation, and he was adept at singing while playing. His formidable technique and rough timbre continue to influence modern aficionados of Appalachian old-time music and in particular the Round Peak style of clawhammer banjo.

Jarrell married Nina Lowe in 1923; she died on February 13, 1967. They had three children: Ardena ("Dena"), b. 1925; Clarence ("Wayne"), b. 1927; and Benjamin Franklin ("B. F."), b. 1933. In his later years, Jarrell lived in the small unincorporated community of Toast, North Carolina. His life is documented in two films by Les Blank.

Jarrell died in January 1985 from a heart attack in his home, at the age of 83.

== Legacy ==
Jarrell's first fiddle, which he bought for $10, is now in the collection of the Smithsonian Institution.

He was the subject of two documentaries produced by Les Blank: Sprout Wings and Fly and My Old Fiddle: A Visit with Tommy Jarrell in the Blue Ridge. He also featured in the 2002 DVD Legends of Old Time Music.

An annual festival, established in 2002 as the Tommy Jarrell Celebration, is held in Mount Airy, North Carolina.

== Selected discography ==
- 1976 - Sail Away Ladies. Tommy Jarrell. County Records
- 1986 - Been Riding with Old Mosby. Frank Bode with Tommy Jarrell and Paul Brown. Folkways Records
