= Old Crow Medicine Show =

Americana string band based in Tennessee

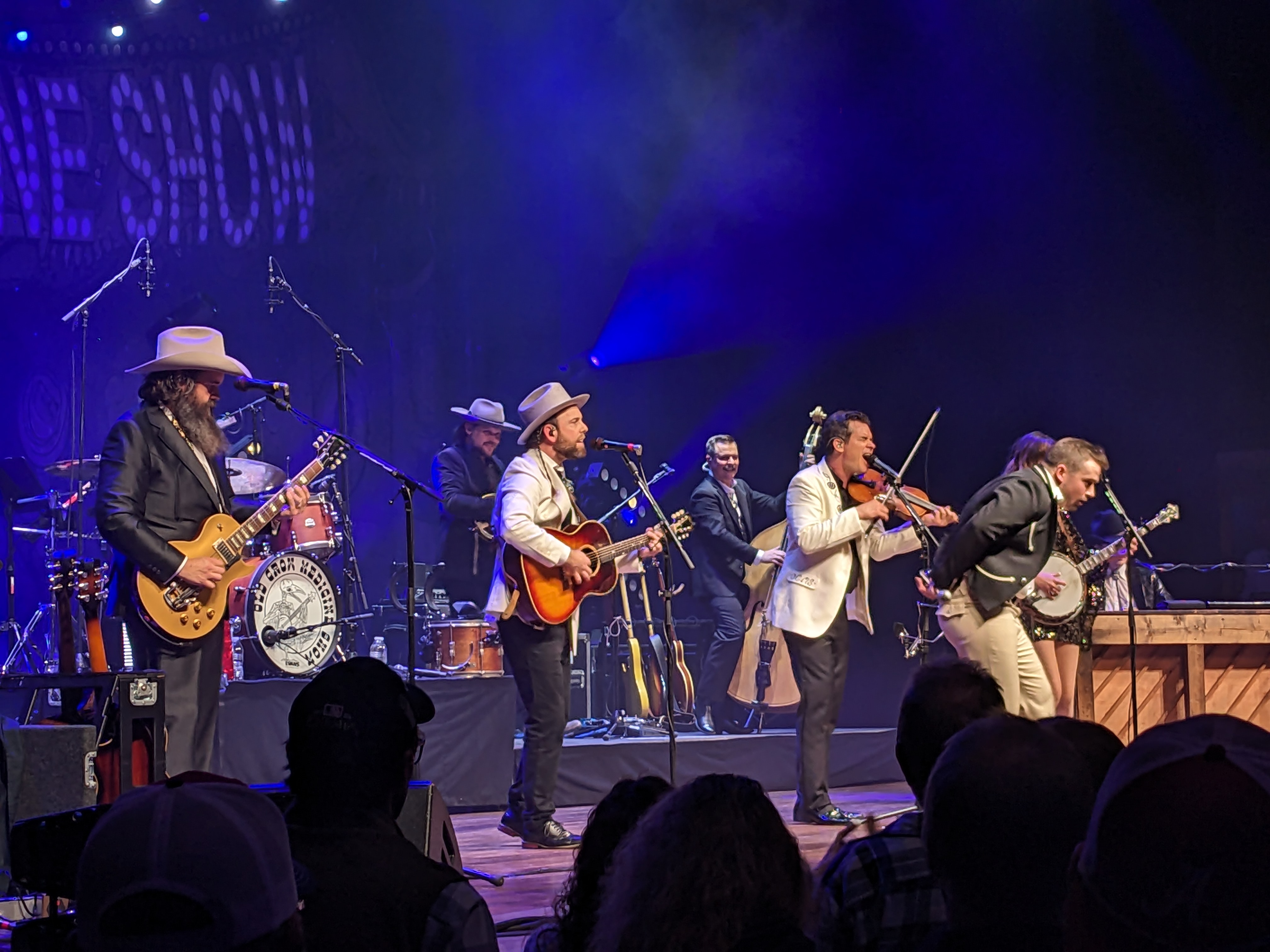
- Old Crow Medicine Show at the Ryman Auditorium in Nashville, New Year's Eve 2024

Background information
- Origin: Harrisonburg, Virginia, U.S.
- Genres: Old-time; folk; alternative country; Americana; blues; bluegrass
- Years active: 1998–present
- Labels: Columbia Nashville, Nettwerk, ATO Records, MapleMusic Recordings (Canada)
- Members: Ketch Secor; Morgan Jahnig; Cory Younts; Chance McCoy; PJ George; Joe Andrews
- Past members: Ben Gould; Willie Watson; Critter Fuqua; Kevin Hayes; Matt Kinman; Gill Landry; Charlie Worsham; Jerry Pentecost; Mason Via; Dante' Pope; Robert Price; Mike Harris
- Website: crowmedicine.com

Old Crow Medicine Show is an Americana string band based in Nashville that has been recording since 1998. They were inducted into the Grand Ole Opry on September 17, 2013. Their ninth album, Remedy, released in 2014, won the Grammy Award for Best Folk Album. The group's music has been called old-time, folk, and alternative country. Along with original songs, the band performs many pre-World War II blues and folk songs.

Bluegrass musician Doc Watson discovered the band while its members were busking outside a pharmacy in Boone, North Carolina, in 2000. With an old-time string sound fueled by punk rock energy, it has influenced acts like Mumford & Sons and contributed to a revival of banjo-picking string bands playing Americana music—leading to variations on it. The group released their sixth studio album, Volunteer, through Columbia Nashville on April 20, 2018—coinciding with their 20th anniversary as a group. They released 50 Years of Blonde on Blonde on April 28, 2017 (their first album on Columbia Nashville). Previous studio albums were Eutaw (2002), O.C.M.S. (2004), Big Iron World (2006), Tennessee Pusher (2008), Carry Me Back (2012), Remedy (2014), and Volunteer (2017). Their song "Wagon Wheel", written by Ketch Secor through a co-authoring arrangement with Bob Dylan, was certified platinum by the Recording Industry Association of America in April 2013 and has been covered by a number of acts, including Darius Rucker, who made the song a top 40 hit.

The band was featured along with Edward Sharpe and the Magnetic Zeros and Mumford & Sons in the music documentary Big Easy Express, which won a Grammy Award for Best Long Form Music Video in 2013. They performed on the Railroad Revival Tour across the U.S. in 2011. They appeared at the Stagecoach Festival 2013 and multiple times at other major festivals, e.g., Bonnaroo Music Festival, MerleFest, Telluride Bluegrass Festival, Hardly Strictly Bluegrass Festival, Newport Folk Festival. and the Mariposa Folk Festival 2024.

They have made frequent guest appearances on A Prairie Home Companion with Garrison Keillor, and have had numerous performances at Red Rocks Amphitheatre as well as a New Year's Eve Residency at The Ryman. The group received the 2013 Trailblazer Award from the Americana Music Association, performing at the Americana Honors & Awards Show.

== History ==
=== Early history ===
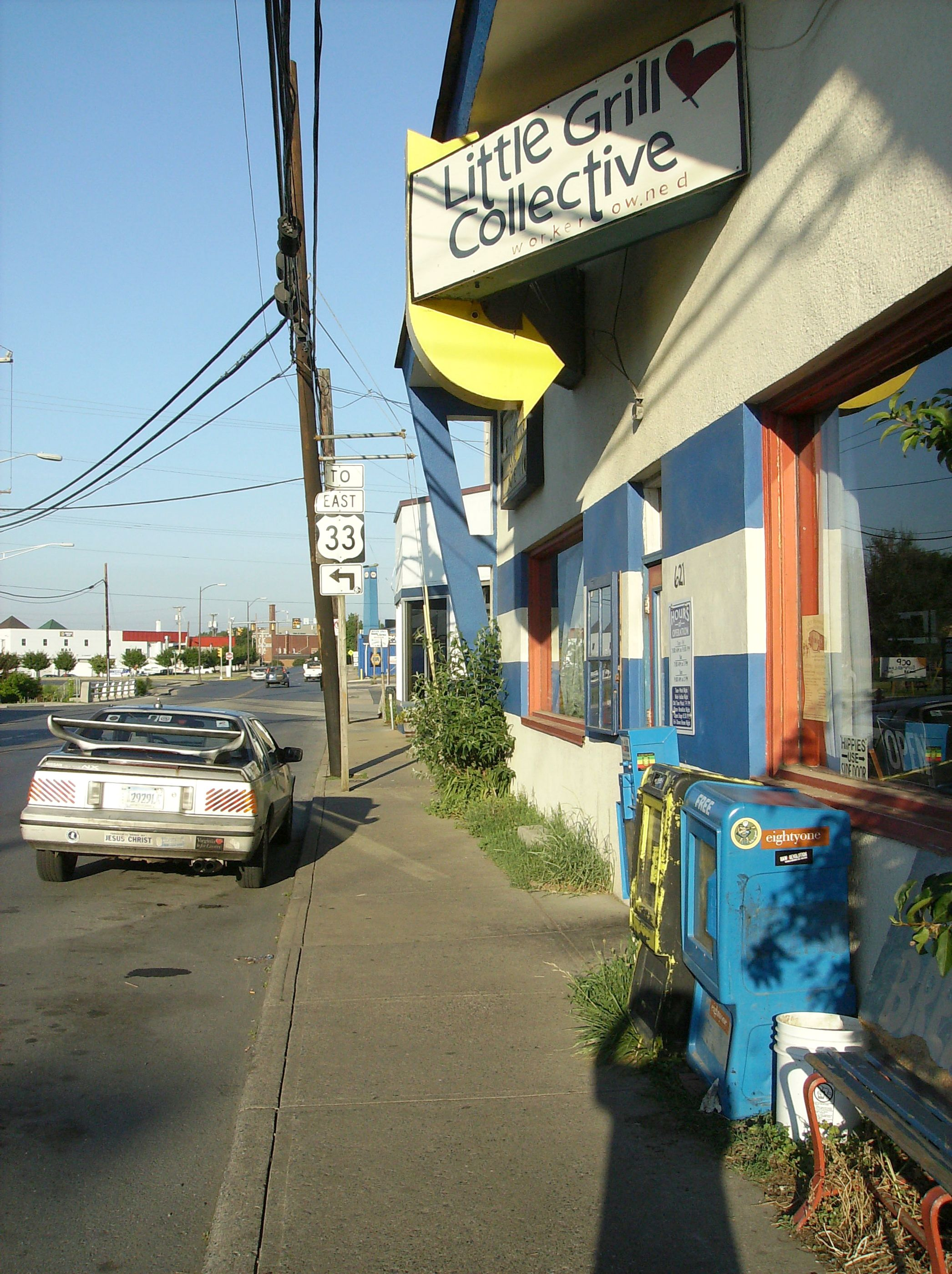
Little Grill Collective in Harrisonburg, Virginia

Ketch Secor and Chris "Critter" Fuqua met in the seventh grade in Harrisonburg, Virginia and began playing music together. They performed open mics at the Little Grill diner, as did Robert St. Ours who went on to found The Hackensaw Boys. Secor had been "driving up to Mt. Jackson, VA to the bluegrass Saturday night in the summer, going up to Davis and Elkins College to participate in the Old-Time Music week there, and meeting guys like Richie Stearns." Secor formed the Route 11 Boys with St. Ours and his brothers, often performing at Little Grill.

Willie Watson first met Ben Gould in high school in Watkins Glen, New York. After playing music together, both dropped out of school and formed the band The Funnest Game. (Note: A "young folksy kind of jam element acoustic band that was really popular in the southern tier region of New York State. ." as Secor describes it. Watson "was playing shows statewide by the time he was sixteen" with "this group that had some congas and some clawhammer banjo . .") Their brand of electric/old-time was heavily influenced by the old-time music scene prominent in Tompkins and Schuyler County, New York, including The Horse Flies and The Highwoods Stringband.

Ithaca and that surrounding area were a big influence on us. We wouldn't be here without a lot of the people we met there, like Richie Stearns, the Red Hots and Mac Benford. All those old-time banjo players brought the music from the South back up to New York, and it was kind of a hotbed.

— Critter Fuqua

After the breakup of the Route 11 Boys, Secor attended Ithaca College in Ithaca, New York. He brought Fuqua to New York where they met Watson. Watson dissolved The Funnest Game and together they assembled players all around Ithaca, New York "where there is a very lively old-time music scene." (Note: "Ithaca is known far and wide as a hotbed of what's called old-time music," says Pete "Dr. Banjo" Wernick. Adds Mac Benford: "Ithaca for 40 years has been a center of old time music, nationally.") This included Kevin Hayes. They recorded an album that they could sell on the road—a cassette of ten songs called Trans:mission. The group embarked on the Trans: mission tour in October 1998, busking across Canada. Circling back east in Spring 1999, they moved into a farmhouse on Beech Mountain, near Boone, North Carolina, where they were embraced by the Appalachian community. Their repertoire of old-time songs grew as they played with local musicians."

=== "Wagon Wheel" ===
Fuqua first brought home a Bob Dylan bootleg from a family trip to London containing a rough outtake called "Rock Me, Mama", (Note: Generally titled "Rock Me Mama", the Dylan outtake came out of recording sessions for the Pat Garrett and Billy the Kid movie soundtrack (1973) in Burbank, California.) passing it to Secor. Not "so much a song as a sketch," Secor would later say, "crudely recorded featuring most prominently a stomping boot, the candy-coated chorus and a mumbled verse that was hard to make out". But the tune kept going through his mind. A few months later, while attending Phillips Exeter Academy in Exeter, New Hampshire, and "feeling homesick for the South," he added verses about "hitchhiking his way home full of romantic notions put in his head by the Beat poets and, most of all, Dylan." (Note: Secor later met Dylan's son, Jakob, who said "it made sense that I was a teenager when I did that because no one in their 30s would have the guts to try to write a Bob Dylan song.")

Secor says he sang his amplification of the song "all around the country from about 17 to 26, before I ever even thought, 'oh I better look into this.'" When he sought copyright in 2003, to release the song on O.C.M.S. in (2004), he discovered Dylan credited the phrase "Rock me, mama" to bluesman Arthur "Big Boy" Crudup (who likely got it from a Big Bill Broonzy recording) "In a way, it's taken something like 85 years to get completed," Secor says. Secor and Dylan signed a co-writing agreement, and share copyright on the song, agreeing to a "50–50 split in authorship." Officially released twice, on an early EP and their second album ("O.C.M.S." in 2004), the song became the group's signature song—going gold in 2011 and platinum in 2013.

=== Busking break ===
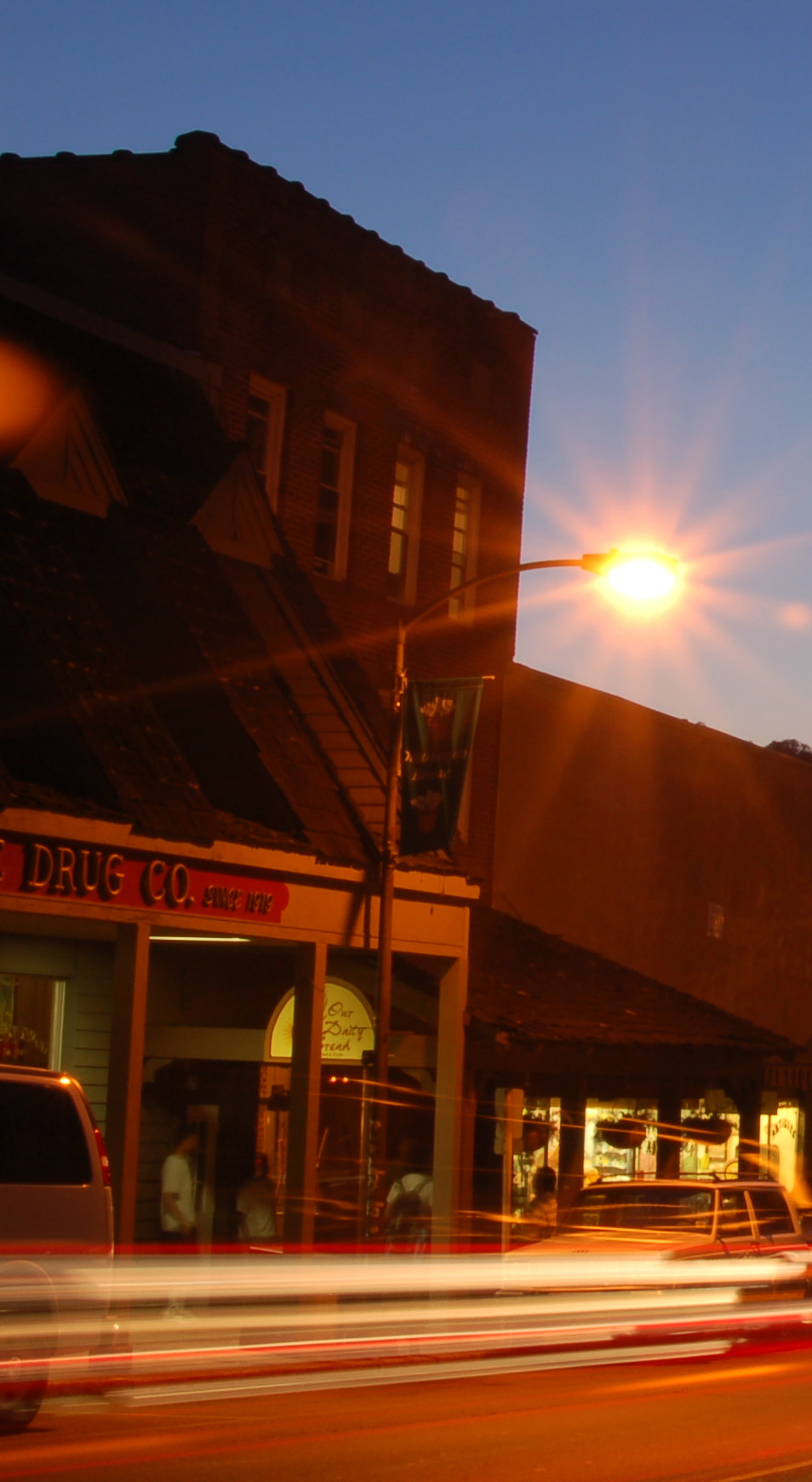
Boone Drug (left) looking west down King Street in Boone, North Carolina; where the group had their big busking break

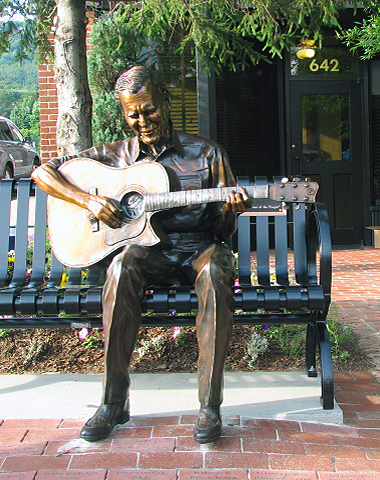
Sculpture of Doc Watson at the corner King and Depot Streets in Boone, North Carolina. He would invite the group to perform at MerleFest after hearing them busk at his "old corner".

The earliest beginnings of the group involved busking in the northeast U.S., attracting fresh talent. "Our performance comes out of all those years spent cutting our teeth on the street corner," claims Secor. One day the group were busking outside Boone Drug (Note: "playing on Doc's old corner" where he'd "started playing in the 1950s") in downtown Boone, when the daughter of folk-country legend Doc Watson heard them. (Note: Secor recounts: "In the year 2000, his daughter heard us play outside of his favorite restaurant, the Boone Drug. Doc had something he liked on the menu at the Drug, so he was often there.") Certain her father would be impressed, she led the blind musician over for a listen. The group "struck up 'Oh My Little Darling', a well-known old-time song they thought Doc would like." When they finished, he said: "Boys, that was some of the most authentic old-time music I've heard in a long while. You almost got me crying." Doc invited the band to participate in his annual MerleFest music festival (Note: Founded in 1988 in memory of Doc's son Eddy Merle Watson, who died in a farm tractor accident in 1985, as a fundraiser for Wilkes Community College and to celebrate "traditional plus" music.) in Wilkesboro, North Carolina

"That gig changed our lives and we look to it as a pivotal turning point as Old Crow Medicine Show," says Secor. He and Fuqua wrote a song called "Doc's Day" "About being on the corner in Boone and [Watson] discovering us. It honors Doc and the high country blues sound."

Guitjo player Kevin Hayes, originally from Haverhill, Massachusetts, was in Bar Harbor, Maine raking blueberries when he encountered Secor "on the street in front of a jewelry store playing the banjo." Bassist Morgan Jahnig joined the group (Note: when Ben Gould "had a baby, and couldn't swing it down south", according to Secor.) as a result of a "random" encounter with early Old Crow performing on the streets of Nashville in 2000. Guitarist Gill Landry first met the group in 2000 while both were street performing during Mardi Gras in New Orleans, joining full-time in 2007.

=== Grand Ole Opry ===
The big busking break led to relocation to Nashville in October 2000. (Note: They first "occupied an inexpensive two-story house on a dead-end peninsula squeezed on three sides by highways, where the drone of passing cars was constant" on Dickerson Pike in E. Nashville "a thoroughfare best known for its whoring, drugging ways.") At MerleFest, Secor explains, Sally Williams "from the Grand Ole Opry... invited us to participate in some summer music events at the Grand Ole Opry House doing our street act, our busking, and that's why we came to Nashville . ." Williams first booked them for "an Opryland Plaza outdoor show." In Nashville they were "embraced and mentored" by Marty Stuart, the president of the Grand Ole Opry, who first spied the group at the Nashville-area Uncle Dave Macon Days festival and added them to his "Electric Barnyard old-fashioned country variety package show bus tour" with acts including Merle Haggard, Connie Smith, and BR5-49. Soon they were opening for "everyone from Loretta Lynn and Dolly Parton to Ricky Skaggs and Del McCoury . ."

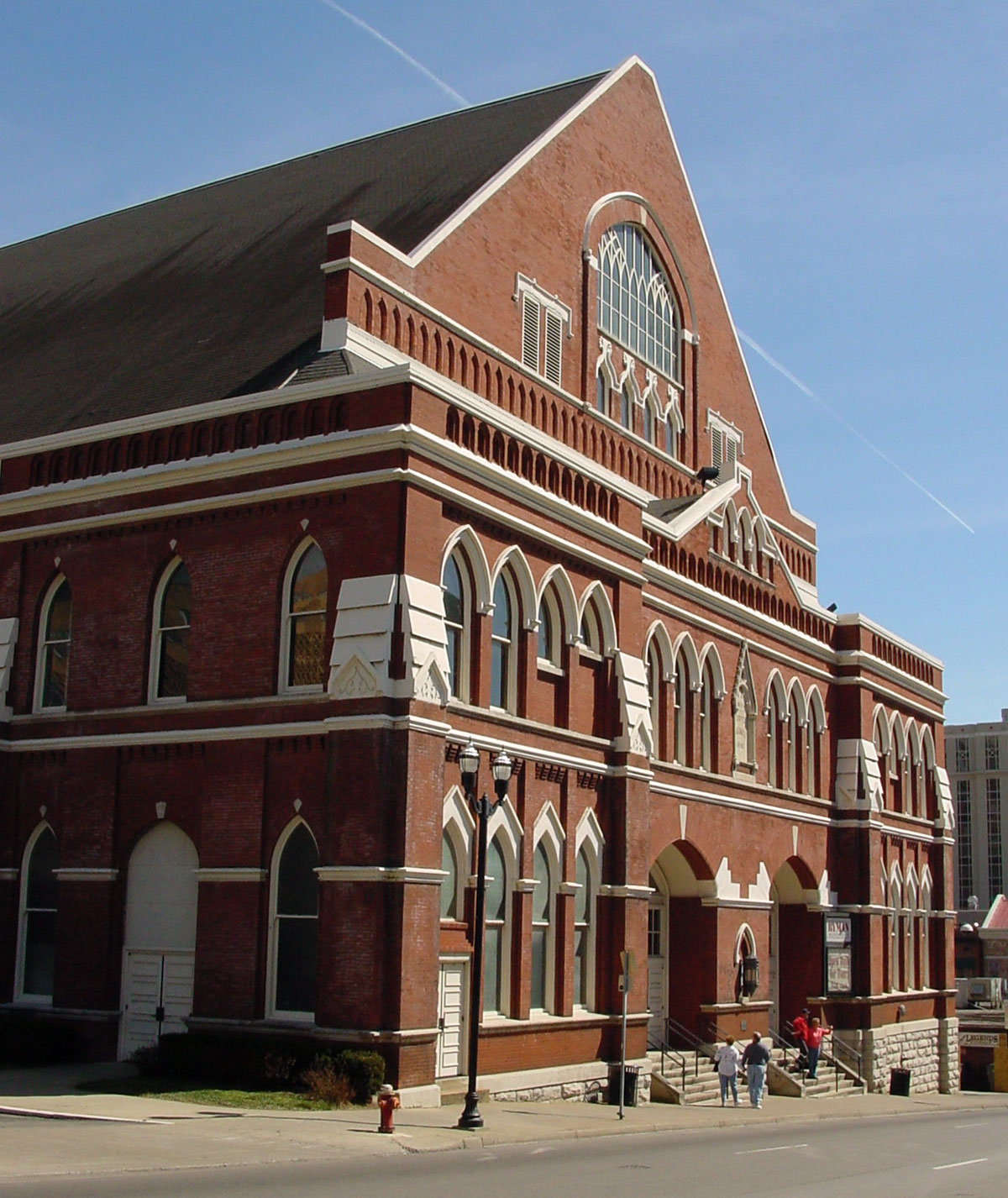
The Ryman Auditorium on 116 5th Avenue North in Nashville, known as "The Mother Church of Country Music"

The group made their Grand Ole Opry debut at the Ryman Auditorium, "The Mother Church of Country Music", in January 2001. Given just four minutes on stage, they played "Tear It Down", a "singing jug-band romp about punishing infidelity", and received a "rare first-time-out standing ovation, and a call for an encore." Old Crow began a tradition of appearing for an annual New Year's Eve show in 2009. A second show was added December 30 of each year due to popularity. The Rolling Stone commented: "Ketch Secor dazzled the Ryman Auditorium audience with his vaudeville banter, fiddle playing, and some harmonica magic." SiriusXM’s Outlaw Country station broadcast the 2020 New Year’s Eve concert live.

In August 2013, Stuart unexpectedly appeared onstage at the Ohio Theatre in Cleveland, where the group was performing, to invite them to become official members of the Opry. They were formally inducted at a special ceremony at the Grand Ole Opry House in Nashville, September 17, 2013. In 2020, the group released three tracks that all referenced contemporary events: "Nashville Rising," written after Nashville's Super Tuesday tornadoes and directly benefiting relief efforts; "Quarantined", a tongue-in-cheek, classic country-inspired number about not being able to kiss your lover while quarantined; and "Pray For America," which was commissioned by NPR as an inspirational piece for listeners coming out of COVID. They appeared on a duet with Keb' Mo' titled "The Medicine Man" as well as teaming up with filmmaker Julia Golonka to create a video for the 2008 track "Motel In Memphis" raising funds for Nashville's community-based grassroots organization Gideon's Army.

Later in 2008, Old Crow Medicine Show purchased a building in Nashville which has been dubbed the band's "Hartland Studio," where they record new music and produce their "Hartland Hootenanny" live-stream variety shows.

== Albums ==
=== Carry Me Back (2012) ===
Carry Me Back was released July 17, 2012, on ATO Records. Recorded at Sound Emporium Studios in Nashville, produced by Ted Hutt, the name derives from "Carry Me Back to Old Virginny", former official state song of Virginia.

"Levi" is "about a soldier who grew up in the wild hillbilly woods of Virginia," First Lieutenant Leevi Barnard from Ararat, Virginia who was "killed by a suicide bomber" in Baghdad's Dora Market in 2009. In the NPR broadcast where Secor heard the story, the late lieutenant's friends "broke into Barnard's favorite song"... "Wagon Wheel" at his funeral.

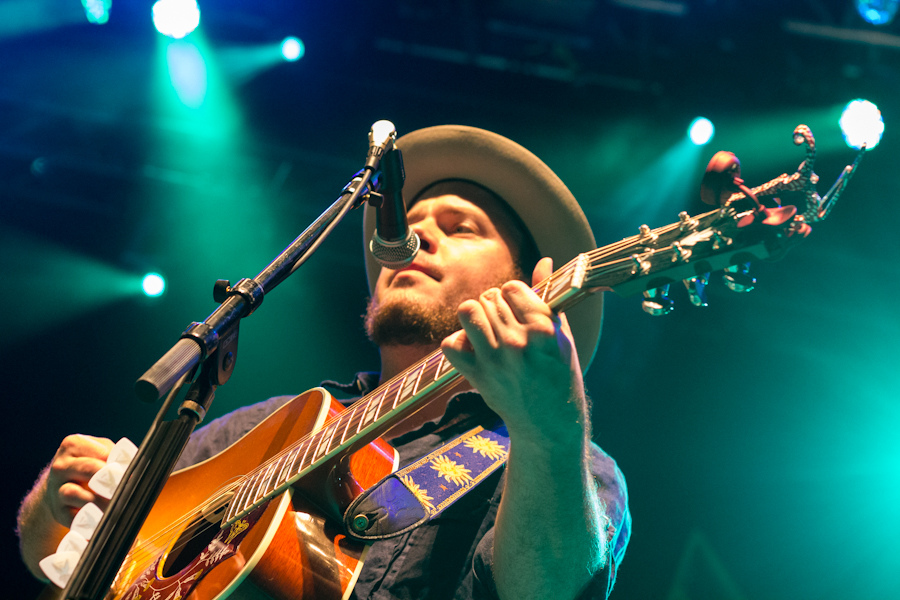
Chris 'Critter' Fuqua performs with the group on acoustic guitar at the 9:30 Club in Washington, D.C., on August 2, 2012.

The album sold over 17,000 copies its debut week, "landing at No. 22 on the Billboard Albums Chart", leading to both the band's best-ever sales week and their highest ever charting position. It attained #1 on both the Bluegrass and Folk charts and was the No. 4 Country album in the nation".

Carry Me Back exploits a kaleidoscopic galaxy of joyous old-timey string sounds updated for the 21st century.

— Dave Dawson, Nu Country

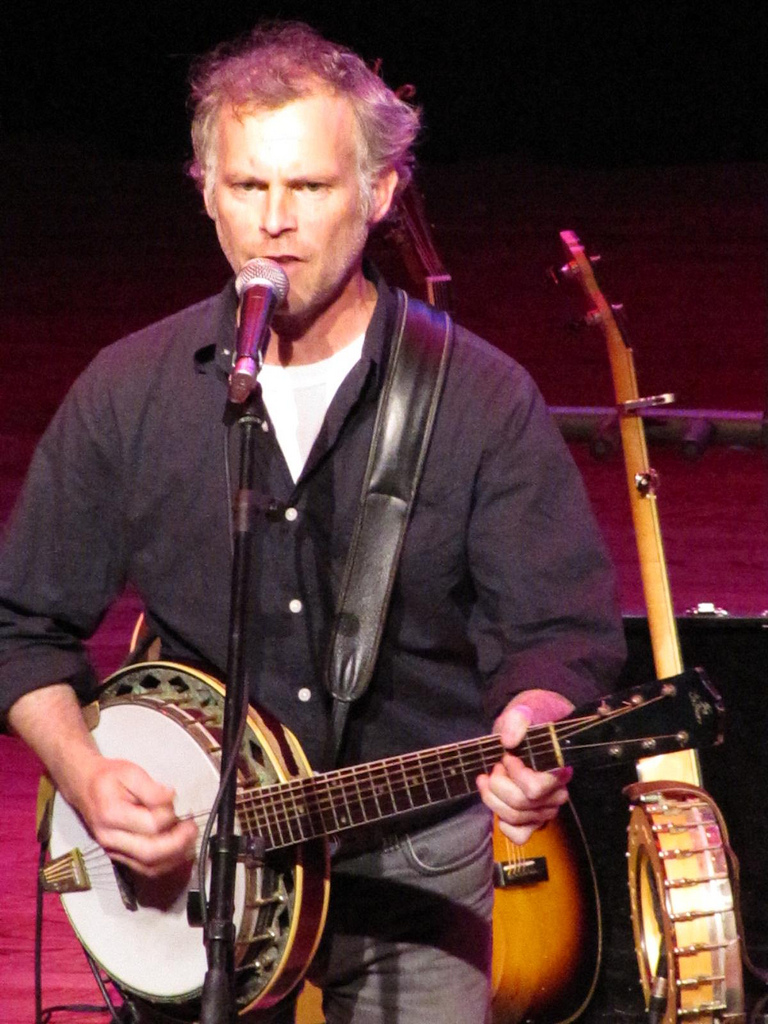
Kevin Hayes plays guitjo with Old Crow Medicine Show at the Tivoli Theatre in Chattanooga, Tennessee on May 5, 2010, adding a unique sound.

=== Remedy (2014) ===
The group's ninth album, Remedy, was released in July 2014 by ATO Records and produced by Ted Hutt—who produced their previous studio record. The album features a collaboration with Bob Dylan, "Sweet Amarillo", and ballads "Dearly Departed Friend" and "Firewater", the latter written by Fuqua. Remedy won the Grammy Award for Best Folk Album in 2015. The award, created in 2012 to address "challenges in distinguishing between" previous category Best Contemporary Folk Album and Best Traditional Folk Album musical genres, was won by Guy Clark in 2011 and Béla Fleck and Abigail Washburn in 2012. Also nominated in 2015 were Mike Auldridge, Jerry Douglas and Rob Ickes for Three Bells, Alice Gerrard for Follow the Music, Eliza Gilkyson for The Nocturne Diaries, and Jesse Winchester (1944–2014) for A Reasonable Amount of Trouble.

=== 50 Years of Blonde on Blonde (2017) ===
The group released 50 Years of Blonde on Blonde on April 28, 2017 on their new label Columbia Nashville. The album pays tribute to Dylan's 1966 masterpiece Blonde on Blonde with live recordings of the group's re-creation of it at the Country Music Hall of Fame and Museum in Nashville in May 2016.

The project doubles as the group's first release for the Columbia label, which also released Blonde on Blonde. They announced their addition to the roster with an impromptu performance of "Rainy Day Women #12 & 35" from the Dylan album. In support of the album release, Secor said:

Fifty years is a long time for a place like Nashville... Time rolls on slowly around here like flotsam and jetsam in the muddy Cumberland River. But certain things have accelerated the pace of our city. And certain people have sent the hands of the clock spinning. Bob Dylan is the greatest of these time-bending, paradigm-shifting Nashville cats.

=== Volunteer (2018) ===
Old Crow Medicine Show released their sixth studio album, Volunteer, through Columbia Nashville on April 20, 2018—coinciding with their 20th anniversary as a group. The album was recorded at Nashville's "historic" RCA Studio A with Americana "super-producer" Dave Cobb, known for his work with Jason Isbell and Chris Stapleton. The album features electric guitar for the first time since 2004—when David Rawlings added his Telecaster to "Wagon Wheel". Joe Jackson Andrews plays pedal steel guitar. As quoted in Billboard, Secor says of the album's sound:

Because we were working with Dave, we wanted to pull out some of our more, I guess, rockin' sounds and do less of a roots music or old-time acoustic record. We wanted to have it be a little bigger. We were in a big room, RCA Studio A as opposed to Studio B, and a lot of times the music kind of matches the space.

"Look Away" is a "Rolling Stones-inspired tribute to the history of the American South," while "A World Away" is an "upbeat homage to refugees." "Dixie Avenue" is a wistful tribute to the place in Virginia where Secor and Fuqua first "fell in love with music." The closing song "Whirlwind" is a "bittersweet love song that could easily describe Old Crow Medicine's rise to prominence from the ground up." The lead single "Flicker & Shine" was released January 19, 2018.

=== Paint This Town (2022) ===
The band released their seventh studio album, Paint This Town on April 22, 2022. It is their first to feature members Jerry Pentecost (drums/percussion), Mike Harris (banjo/guitar) and Mason Via (guitar/vocals) and their first since the second departure of founding member Fuqua at the end of 2019. In March 2023, Old Crow played at C2C: Country to Country, Europe's largest country music festival, performing at the 3Arena in Dublin, OVO Hydro in Glasgow and The O2 Arena in London.

=== Jubilee (2023) ===
Celebrating 25 years as a group, Old Crow released their eighth studio album, Jubilee, 25 August 2023 through ATO Records. Nominated for the Grammy Award for Best Folk Album at the 66th Annual Grammy Awards, the album, with Matt Ross-Spang co-producing, features as guest artists Sierra Ferrell, Mavis Staples, and (former group member) Willie Watson.

=== OCMS XMAS (2025) ===
On November 21, 2025 the group released its first "holiday album" entitled OCMS XMAS on Hartland Records featuring two covers of Christmas classics and 11 originals. Their take on the John Lennon and Yoko Ono "global peace anthem" "Happy Xmas (War Is Over)" uses harmonies from the children of the Episcopal School of Nashville (founded by Secor and his wife).

=== Union Made (2026) ===
The group's new album Union Made, available June 5, 2026 on Hartland Records (via Firebird Music), features a number of guests, including: John Carter Cash, Evan Felker, Del & Ronnie McCoury, Maggie Rose, Molly Tuttle, and Jesse Welles. Secor says of the project:

This is a fascinating time in our short history as a nation. We wanted to meet that moment by collecting a bunch of songs that speak to the joys and potentials, the rights and the wrongs of where we are today, where we’re going, and what can embolden us to have a more perfect union in the future. There are wonderful, ghostly American sounds that only bands steeped in folk music traditions know how to conjure, and it seems like an important time for those voices to be heard.

The album was produced by group bassist Morgan Jahnig, while PJ George performed most of the bass parts.

Described as "a love letter to the United States," Secor said of the album:

You know, our last couple albums weren't so overtly a love letter to the US of A, even though as I look back on 28 years of being in Old Crow Medicine Show, I've been writing love letters to the states since I was a kid. I grew up in the Shenandoah Valley of Virginia, where so many of the battles were fought in the Civil War, but also where so many of the ideals were crafted in the founding of America. And we went and mythologized the story of the Merrimack and the Monitor.

== Musical style ==
The sound is invigorating on their recordings, but at a live show the fiddle, banjo, and harmonica are practically on fire, creating a crazy, addictive mix of some of the best traditional music America has to offer with the intensity of a modern-day rock show.

— Elizabeth Pandolfi, Charleston City Paper

Variously described as old-time, Americana, bluegrass, alternative country, and "folk-country", the group began with infusing old Appalachian sounds with new punk energy. Country Music Television notes their "tunes from jug bands and traveling shows, back porches and dance halls, southern Appalachian string music and Memphis blues." Gabrielle Gray, executive director of the International Bluegrass Music Museum, who sponsors ROMP: Bluegrass Roots & Branches Festival, which Old Crow headlined one night in 2012, says the group "is in the direction of progressive bluegrass." Their live touring show has been described as a "folk-bluegrass-alt-country blend."

"We just knew we wanted to combine the technical side of the old sound with the energy of a Nirvana," said Fuqua. Starting from old-time music in the Appalachian hills, the group found themselves "making a foray into electric instruments and 'really knocking up the rock 'n' roll tree' on their 2008 release 'Tennessee Pusher'." On the documentary "Big Easy Express" about the Railroad Revival Tour with Mumford & Sons and Edward Sharpe and the Magnetic Zeros they "practice(d) a complimentary variation of folk" bringing "a pleasingly smoky amalgam of country, bluegrass, and blues." With "Carry Me Back" (2012) they've "circled back to the original sound that so excited (Secor) and Fuqua as kids... full of old-timey string sounds updated for the 21st century, sing-a-longs that lift the soul, ballads that rend the heart and a few moments of pure exhilaration."

=== Influences ===
An early Secor influence was John Hartford who performed for his first grade class in Missouri, making him want "to play the banjo after that;" and the first song he ever learned to play was Tom Paxton's "Ramblin' Boy". Guns N' Roses was Fuqua's "first influence": when they released Appetite for Destruction (1987), while he was in seventh grade, he knew he wanted to be a musician. He also claims AC/DC and Nirvana as influences "and then into blues and then into more obscure fiddlers. Some Conjunto from down in San Antonio." "Take 'Em Away", written when he was 17, is "loosely based on Mance Lipscomb, a blues singer and sharecropper from Navasota County" who he says "was a big influence on me."

Naming his major influences, Secor states: "Certainly, Bob Dylan... Bob Dylan... Bob Dylan. More than anything else. More than any book or song or story or play. The work and the recorded work of Bob Dylan. It's the most profound influence on me. And then the other people that really influenced me, tend to be the same people who influenced Bob Dylan." Fuqua concurs about Dylan's influence:

He's a link to Woody Guthrie, who's a link to an even earlier form of American music history. He's... a great doorway for all sorts of artists because he's not just folk or just rock ... I think bands like us, Mumford and Sons, and Gillian Welch and David Rawlings are sort of doing what he has done before, in that we take our own experiences and observations and put them into songs made of traditional, American roots form. That form is still a great vehicle for songs, whether the song is about love, the Iraq War or anything else.

The Dylan doorway led to the first recordings of the New Lost City Ramblers, the Jim Kweskin Jug Band, Canned Heat, The Lovin' Spoonful, Dylan and The Band in the basement, and the Grateful Dead.

=== Impact ===
While it would be going a bit far to say Old Crow sparked a full-blown folk revival, these guys have contributed mightily to a major shift in youthful attitudes toward ownership, authenticity and what it means to feel included in a musical experience: lyrics don't have to be strict autobiography to connect; songs don't have to be entirely original to showcase originality; and younger generations need not turn up their noses at music that doesn't treat them like they're at the center of the universe.

— Jewly Hight, American Songwriter

When Secor, Fuqua, and company first got together "old-timey pickers their age were few and far between. Modern rock was still a force to be reckoned with. Now hard-driving string bands are where it's at." To Americana Music Association (AMA) President Jed Hilly, the historic path of Americana music passes through the group: "The baton is passed from Emmylou Harris to Gillian Welch and David Rawlings to Old Crow Medicine Show to the Avett Brothers." Emmylou Harris was, in fact...

among the gateway artists who helped Mumford and bandmates Ben Lovett, Ted Dwane and Winston Marshall discover their love for American roots music. It started with the 'O Brother, Where Art Thou?' soundtrack . . That eventually led them to the Old Crow Medicine Show and then deep immersion in old-timey sounds from America's long-neglected past.

You can't swing a cat these days without hitting a hipster with a banjo in his hands. At least part of the credit for this phenomenon goes to Old Crow Medicine Show.

— Chrissie Dickinson, Chicago Tribune

Marcus Mumford, front man of Mumford & Sons, credits the group's influence: "I first heard Old Crow's music when I was, like, 16, 17, and that really got me into, like, folk music, bluegrass. I mean, I'd listened to a lot of Dylan, but I hadn't really ventured into the country world so much. So Old Crow was the band that made me fall in love with country music." Mumford acknowledges in "Big Easy Express", Emmett Malloy's "moving documentary" about the vintage train tour they'd invited Old Crow to join them on, that "the band inspired them to pick up the banjo and start their now famous country nights in London."

Old Crow received the 2013 Trailblazer Award from the Americana Music Association.

== Songwriting ==
It takes a lot to figure out how to keep one foot in old-time and one foot in all time. It's a bit of a dance to be rooted and modern at the same time. I think we've figured out how to write those songs that sound like they were sung by some campfire 85 years ago, but sound good blasted from the stereo of a Ford Ranchero in a Burger King parking lot somewhere outside of Enid.

— Ketch Secor

Early on the group didn't perform songs they'd written, instead drawing on a storehouse of pre-war jug band, string band, minstrel show, blues, and folk fare. As with other young groups in the genre, driven by all that punk music energy, they played this old material "fast and hard". When they started writing original material they distinguished themselves "from the crowded field of New Wave string bands as genuine stars. And both groups have done it by writing new songs more ambitious than mere rewrites of old hillbilly and blues numbers." Songs they write often have a socially conscious theme, such as "I Hear Them All", "Ways Of Man", "Ain't It Enough", and "Levi".

Secor admits to developing "the habit of writing what he calls 'stolen melody songs'"—in much the same way he'd created "Wagon Wheel", carrying on in the folk tradition—"like when he penned fresh, war tax-themed lyrics to a tune that had already passed through other wholesale re-writes during its descent from old-time Scots-Irish balladry." Dave Rawlings states: "I've always thought that a really important thing that the Old Crow Medicine Show brought to the table was new songs—some reinterpreted old ones, some really nicely written and brand new—with the old flavor, but also with that vitality."

== Awards, honors, and distinctions ==
Year	Association	Category	Nominee	Result
2004	CMT Music Awards	Top 10 Bluegrass Albums	"O.C.M.S."	Won
2007	CMT Music Awards	Best Group	Old Crow Medicine Show	Nominated
2007	CMT Music Awards	Wide Open Country	"I Hear Them All" (video)	Nominated
2007	Americana Music Award	Best Duo Or Group	Old Crow Medicine Show	Nominated
2012	Grammy Awards	Best Long Form Music Video	Big Easy Express	Won
2013	Americana Honors & Awards Show	Trailblazer Award	Old Crow Medicine Show	Won
2013	Country Music Association Awards	Song of the Year	"Wagon Wheel"	Nominated
2015	Grammy Awards	Best Folk Album	Remedy	Won
2024	Grammy Awards	Best Folk Album	Jubilee	Nominated

- Old Crow Medicine Show performed on a float for the 2003 Macy's Thanksgiving Day Parade.
- Their music video of "I Hear Them All" (from Big Iron World) was first-round finalist in both CMT Award categories in which it was nominated. Directed by Danny Clinch, the video was shot in the Mid-City area of New Orleans featuring local residents with inspirational stories about surviving Hurricane Katrina.
- For the Americana Music Award show held November 1, 2007 at the Ryman Auditorium in Nashville they joined Uncle Earl, Sunny Sweeney, Todd Snider, The Avett Brothers, Guy Clark, Emmylou Harris, the Hacienda Brothers, Elizabeth Cook, Amy LaVere, and Ricky Skaggs with Bruce Hornsby as performers on stage.
- The band has been inducted as official members of the Grand Ole Opry.
- The music documentary Big Easy Express, in which the band was featured along with Edward Sharpe and the Magnetic Zeros and Mumford and Sons, won a Grammy Award for Best Long Form Music Video in March 2013. Directed by Emmett Malloy, the video was produced by Bryan Ling, Mike Luba, and Tim Lynch under the S2BN Films label.
- Their recording of "Wagon Wheel" was certified triple platinum by the Recording Industry Association of America in 2023.
- Old Crow Medicine Show was formally inducted into the Grand Ole Opry at a special ceremony at the Grand Ole Opry House in Nashville on September 17, 2013. They join other group Opry members like Gatlin Brothers, Oak Ridge Boys, Osborne Brothers, and Rascal Flatts—and individual member acts Roy Clark, Clint Black, Garth Brooks, Charlie Daniels, Vince Gill, Emmylou Harris, Tom T. Hall, Alison Krauss, Loretta Lynn, Patti Loveless, Del McCoury, Charley Pride, and Ricky Skaggs.
- The group performed during the 12th Annual Americana Honors & Awards Show, which took place September 18, 2013 at the Ryman Auditorium in Nashville, sharing stage with such acts as Stephen Stills, Richard Thompson, Emmylou Harris, and Rodney Crowell.
- Darius Rucker's version of "Wagon Wheel" was nominated for CMA Single of the Year in October 2013, along with Florida Georgia Line ("Cruise"), Tim McGraw with Taylor Swift and Keith Urban ("Highway Don't Care"), Miranda Lambert ("Mama's Broken Heart"), and Kacey Musgraves ("Merry Go 'Round").
- Rucker sang "Wagon Wheel" to close out the televised CMA awards ceremony November 6, 2013.

== Film ==
- Old Crow Medicine Show performed on the soundtrack for the film Transamerica in 2005, which was nominated for a number of awards—including two Academy Award nominations—winning several around the world. "Critter" Fuqua wrote "Take 'Em Away" while "We're All in This Together" was written by Ketch Secor and Willie Watson.
- They appeared in the PBS American Roots Music series; "In the Valley Where Time Stands Still", a film about the history of the Renfro Valley Barn Dance; and "Bluegrass Journey", a portrait of the contemporary bluegrass scene.
- They appeared in the musical documentary Big Easy Express, directed by Emmett Malloy, being made of The Railroad Revival Tour, which premiered March 2012 at the South by Southwest Film Conference and Festival (SXSW Film) in Austin, Texas—winning the Headliner Audience Award.

== Members ==
The line-up has changed, and we aren't the same group of guys that set out for the Indian Reservation in South Dakota in 1998. We're not the same group of individuals that picked grapes in New York State to fill our gas tank and roll out of town.

— Ketch Secor

In August 2011, the group announced they were on hiatus, cancelling three shows scheduled for the following month, with "little word from the band on whether there would continue to be a band." Original member Willie Watson left in Fall of 2011, a couple months before Chris "Critter" Fuqua rejoined the group in January 2012. He had left in 2004 for "rehab for his drinking, then staying out to attend college." (Note: Mateer, Chris (July 16, 2012). "Interview: Ketch, Critter, & Morgan of Old Crow Medicine Show Discuss "Carry Me Back"". No Depression.) Cory Younts, who left Old Crow a few months into 2012 to perform in Jack White's backup band Los Buzzardos (or The Buzzards) on world tour to support White's album Blunderbuss, returned to the group in 2013. (Note: Secor reflects: "You can't always stay the same forever . . As much as it changed us to go through the break up with Will, it was tempered by the rejoining of Critter and now Corey Younts.")

Drummer Jerry Pentecost left in 2023 to join Bob Dylan's European tour, replacing "fabulous Charley Drayton" starting in Japan. Announced May 13, 2024, co-founder Fuqua, rejoined the group, saying:

My relationship with the band is a bit like a Saturn 5 rocket. For whatever reason, I need to leave sometimes. I achieve an escape vector from the gravitational pull of Old Crow, then I’m off into space, orbiting, floating in zero gravity in my capsule. But I always seem to come around again, shooting through the atmosphere, my pod landing in the ocean. The boys picked me up again. I’m so glad they did. I really missed them.

Fuqua again left Old Crow as announced July 2024. Chance McCoy rejoined in early 2025. Mike Harris left the band in early 2026 and was replaced with the returning Joe Andrews

=== Current ===
- Ketch Secor – vocals, fiddle, harmonica, banjo, guitar, cigar box guitar (1998–present)
- Morgan Jahnig – upright bass (2000–present)
- Chance McCoy – fiddle, guitar, banjo, mandolin, vocals (2012–2019; 2025)
- Cory Younts – mandolin, harmonica, keyboards, vocals (2009–present)
- PJ George – accordion, banjo, mandolin, fiddle, guitar, guitjo, drums (2023–present)
- Joe Andrews – pedal steel, banjo, mandolin, dobro (2017–2019, 2026–present)

=== Former ===
- Mike Harris – guitar, mandolin, banjo, dobro, vocals (2021–March 2026)
- Chris "Critter" Fuqua – slide guitar, banjo, guitar, vocals (1998–2007, 2012–2020, May 2024–July 2024)
- Willie Watson (Note: Left to pursue a solo career.) – guitar, banjo, fiddle, harmonica, vocals (1998–2011)
- Ben Gould – stand-up bass (1998–1999)
- Kevin Hayes – guitjo, vocals (1998–2020)
- Matt Kinman (Note: A "thirty-year-old friend who had actually grown up playing old-time music, lived in an unheated room off the kitchen" at Dickerson Pike, where the group first lived in Nashville, and "occasionally played with the band" including their Opry debut.) – bones, mandolin, vocals (1999–20??)
- Gill Landry – banjo, resonator guitar, guitar, vocals (2007–2015)
- Robert Price – multi-instrumentalist (2016–2017)
- Jerry Pentecost – drums, marching snare drum, washboard, mandolin, vocals (2017–2023)
- Charlie Worsham – guitar, banjo, vocals (2019)
- Mason Via – guitar, guitjo, vocals (2021–2024)
- Dante' Pope – drums, percussion, piano, vocals (2023–2025)

=== Gallery ===
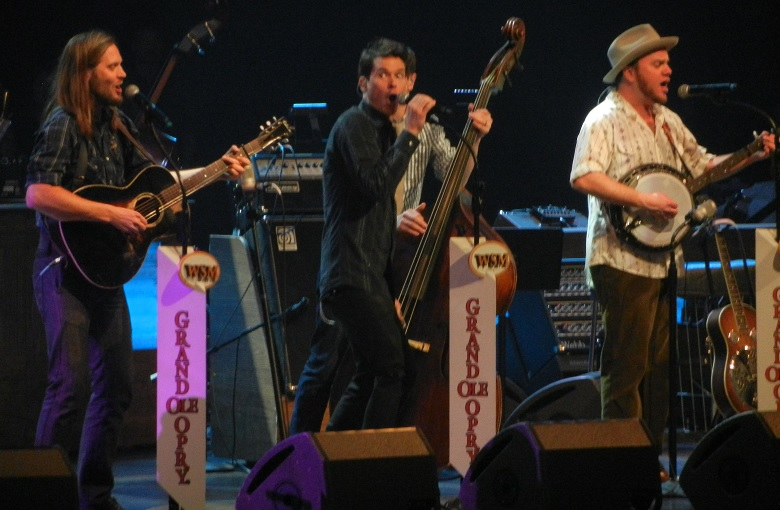
At the Grand Ole Opry in Nashville, February 23, 2013

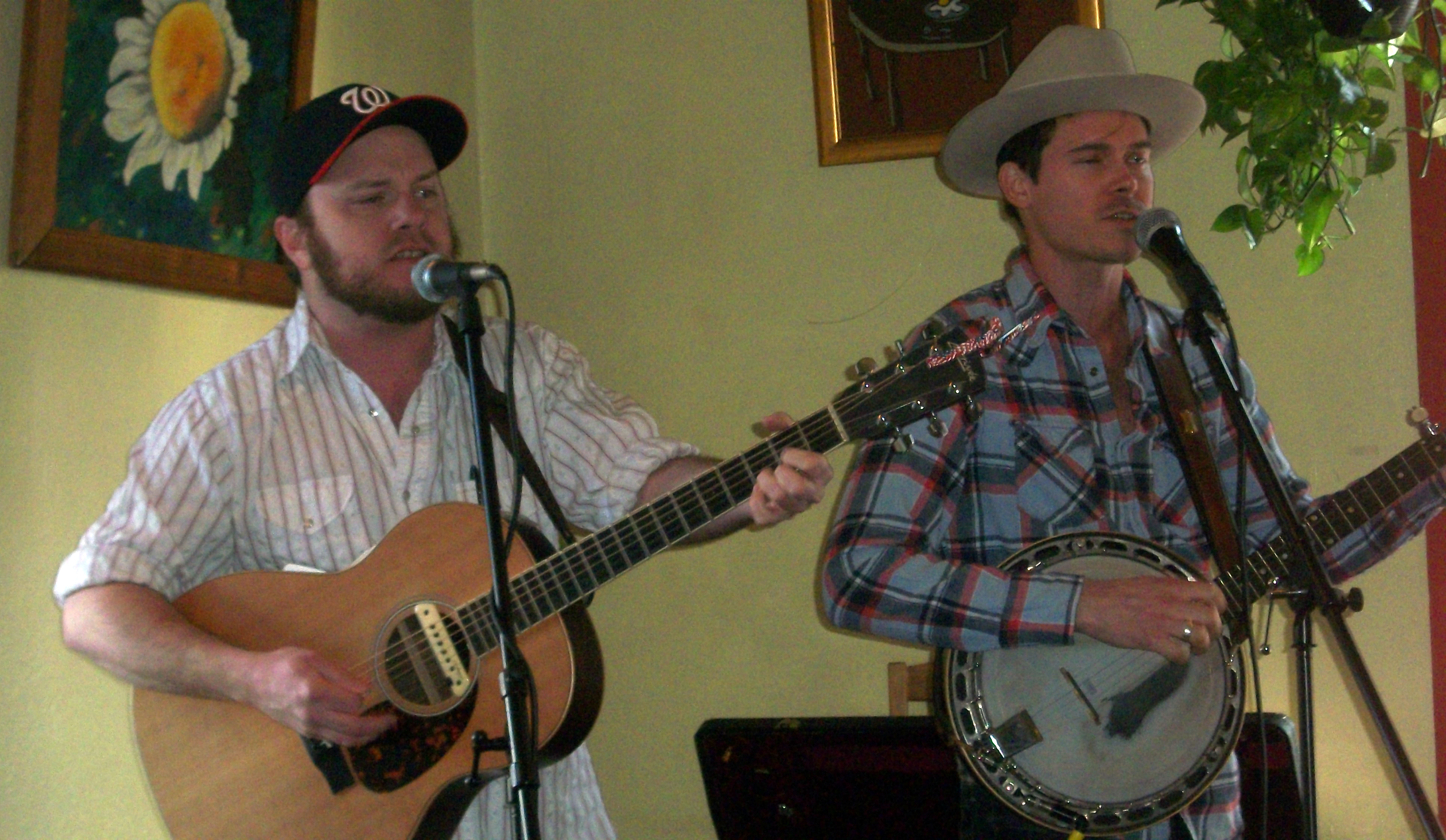
Chris 'Critter' Fuqua (guitar) with Ketch Secor (banjo) at benefit show for Our Community Place
Little Grill Collective in Harrisonburg, Virginia
January 14, 2012.

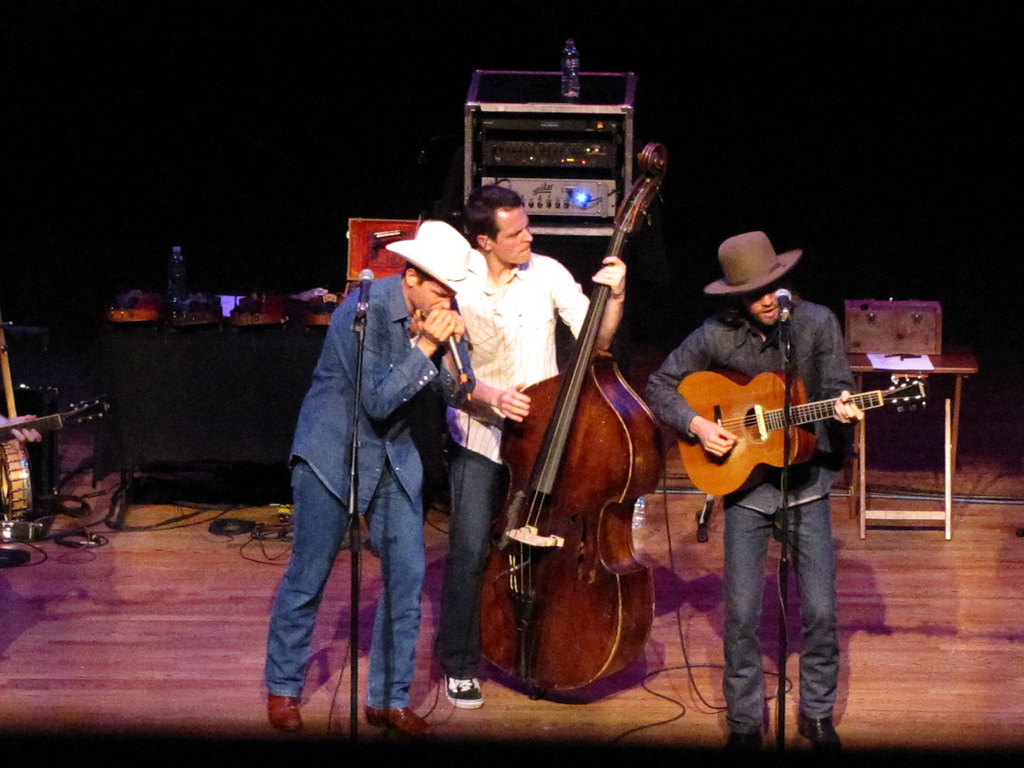
Ketch Secor (harmonica) Morgan Jahnig (bass) Willie Watson (guitar)
Tivoli Theatre in Chattanooga, Tennessee
May 5, 2010

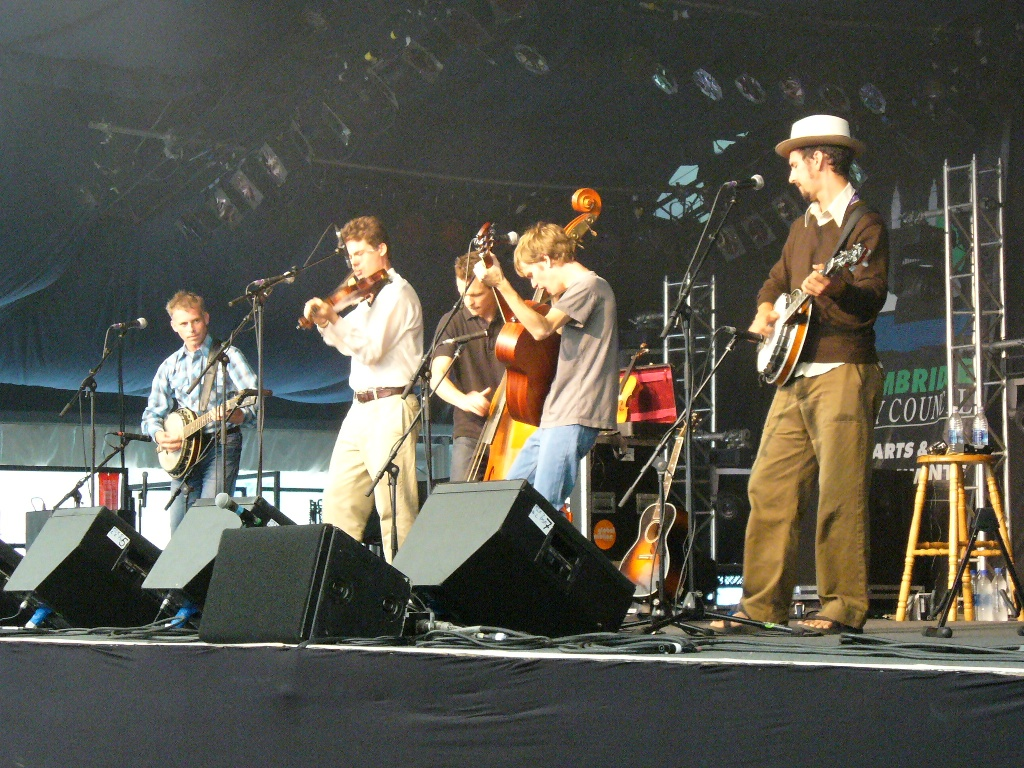
Cambridge Folk Festival in Cambridge, England,
July 30, 2005.

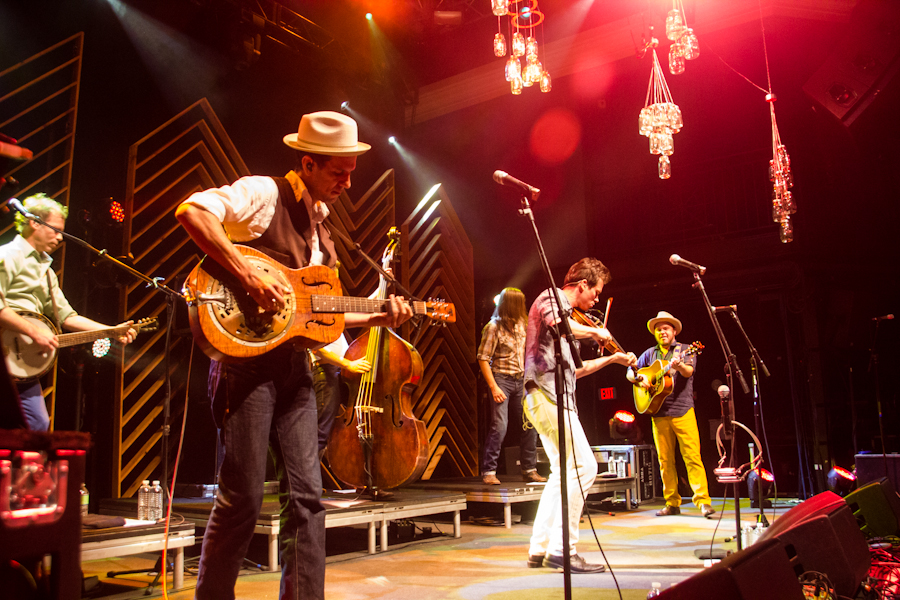
At 9:30 Club in Washington, D.C. August 2, 2012.

== Discography ==
=== Studio albums ===
Year	Album	Peak chart positions							Label
Year	Album	US Grass	US Country	US	US Heat	US Indie	US Folk	US Taste	Label
1998	Trans:mission (cassette)^{A}	—	—	—	—	—	—	—	
2000	Greetings from Wawa^{A}	—	—	—	—	—	—	—	Blood Donor Records
2004	O.C.M.S.^{B}	1	68	—	—	—	—	—	Nettwerk
2006	Big Iron World	1	27	125	2	—	—	11	Nettwerk
2008	Tennessee Pusher	1	7	50	—	—	—	9	Nettwerk
2012	Carry Me Back	1	4	22	—	5	1	5	ATO Records
2014	Remedy	—	4	15	—	2	1	3	ATO Records
2018	Volunteer	1	14	100	—	—	7	—	Columbia Records
2022	Paint This Town	1	—	—	—	—	—	—	ATO
2023	Jubilee	1	—	—	—	—	—	—	ATO
2025	OCMS XMAS	—	—	—	—	—	—	—	Hartland Records
2026	Union Made	—	—	—	—	—	—	—	Hartland Records
"—" denotes releases that did not chart

- ^{A}Out of print.
- ^{B}O.C.M.S. was re-released under the title Old Crow Medicine Show as an import in 2006.

=== Live albums ===
Year	Album	Peak chart positions					Label	Sales
Year	Album	US Grass	US Country	US	US Indie	US Folk	Label	Sales
2001	Eutaw	6	—	—	—	—		
2003	Live	—	—	—	—	—		
2017	50 Years of Blonde on Blonde	1	14	115	—	5	Columbia	
2019	Live at the Ryman	1	—	—	31	—	Old Crow Medicine Show	US: 3,400
"—" denotes releases that did not chart

=== EPs ===
- Vegas (out of print) (cassette only)
- Troubles Up and Down the Road (2001) (out of print)
- The Webcor Sessions (2002) (out of print)
- NapsterLife 09/29/2004 (2004)
- Down Home Girl (2006) - three-track EP featuring previously unreleased song "Fall on My Knees"
- World Cafe Live from iTunes (2006) - broadcast on NPR's World Cafe October 25, 2006
- Caroline (2008), Nettwerk – three-track EP featuring previously unreleased song "Back to New Orleans"
- Carry Me Back to Virginia (2013) - three-track EP featuring a cover of Alabama's "Dixieland Delight"
- Brushy Mountain Conjugal Trailer (2015) - four-track EP featuring the previously unreleased "Mother Church", a live version of "The Warden", and "I Done Wrong Blues" (previously released as a B-side on the "Sweet Amarillo" 7")

=== Contributions ===
- Old Crow Medicine Show performed "Take 'Em Away" (by Fuqua) and "We're All in This Together" (by Secor and Watson) on the soundtrack for the film Transamerica (2005). The film was nominated for a number of awards — including two Oscars — winning several worldwide.
- They perform Woody Guthrie's "Deportee (Plane Wreck at Los Gatos)" (Disc 2/Track 15) on Song of America (2007), a 3-CD set tracing the history of the U.S. through new versions of songs by major artists. Produced by Split Rock Records/Thirty One Tigers. Proceeds benefit the Center for American Music, National History Day, and Folk Alliance.
- Secor wrote, arranged, and performs "Send No Angels" with Lani Marsh on Our Christmas Present: 2008, a fundraising album for Our Community Place in Harrisonburg, Virginia as a favor to founder/director Ron Copeland, who was owner of Little Grill when/where his and Fuqua's music careers began.
- The group recorded "Angel From Montgomery" for Broken Hearts & Dirty Windows: Songs of John Prine (2010), an album celebrating Prine's rich and influential catalog, joining other artists contributing including Justin Vernon of Bon Iver, My Morning Jacket, Josh Ritter, The Avett Brothers, Conor Oberst & The Mystic Valley Band, Drive-By Truckers, Lambchop, and Justin Townes Earle.
- The group appear on "veteran roots/Americana band" Marley's Ghost album Jubilee, released June 2012 on Sage Arts, celebrating their 25th anniversary. Recorded at Nashville's Sound Emporium and produced by Cowboy Jack Clement, the album features other "full-on collaborations between the band and their friends" such as Emmylou Harris, John Prine, Marty Stuart, and Larry Campbell. The album cover a wide variety of classic American songwriters including Kris Kristofferson, Levon Helm, Bobby and Shirley Womack, and John Prine "alongside a half-dozen original compositions."
- The group performs "Back Home Again" (track 6) on The Music Is You: A Tribute to John Denver (2013) on ATO Records, an album spotlighting "Denver's folky, sentimental songs done by popular and generally fashionable artists", including My Morning Jacket, Brandi Carlile, Edward Sharpe & the Magnetic Zeros, Dave Matthews, Lucinda Williams, and Josh Ritter.
- They have a song about how all creatures talk called "Creature Talks" and "Wonder Why" about some of the world's biggest questions to PBS Kids.
- The group collaborated with Marty Stuart on a cover of "I Can See For Miles" for his album Compadres: An Anthology of Duets in 2007.
- They contributed a cover of "Deportee (Plane Wreck at Los Gatos)" to the Song of America folk music compilation album.
- The group contributed two songs to the 2013 album Woody Guthrie: at 100! Live At The Kennedy Center, including "Howdi Do" and "Union Maid."
- For ATO Records' 2013 compilation album Divided & United: The Songs of the Civil War, the group contributed the track "Marching Through Georgia."
- In 2013, Old Crow contributed a cover of "Dixieland Delight" for the 40th Anniversary tribute album for country group Alabama.
- The group contributed the song "Short Life Of Trouble" to the 2015 Ralph Stanley & Friends album Man of Constant Sorrow.
- Keb' Mo' and Old Crow Medicine Show teamed up for the song "Medicine Man" in 2021, which was inspired by the pandemic.
- In 2020, Old Crow were featured on the new Sara Evans album Copy That for the cover of "I'm So Lonesome I Could Cry."
- The group was featured on the song "Big Backyard" on Molly Tuttle's 2022 album Crooked Tree.

=== Music videos ===
Year	Video	Director
2006	"Wagon Wheel"	
2006	"Down Home Girl"	
2006	"Tell It To Me"	
2007	"I Hear Them All"	
2009	"Caroline"	
2014	"Sweet Amarillo"	Philip Andelman
2015	"Brushy Mountain Conjugal Trailer"	
2020	"Quarantined"	
2021	"Motel in Memphis"	
2021	"Pray for America"	
2021	"Paint This Town"	Travis Nicholson
2022	"Bombs Away" (featuring Molly Tuttle)	Weston Heflin

== See also ==
- Old time fiddle
- Old-time music
- Old Crow

== Notes ==
Awards
Preceded by Bob Harris	AMA Americana Trailblazer Award; 2013	Succeeded by Don Henley (2015)
Preceded by Guy Clark	Grammy Award for Best Folk Album; 2015	Succeeded by Béla Fleck & Abigail Washburn
