= Next Go Round =

Next Go Round may refer to:

- "Next Go Round", a song by Nickelback from the album Dark Horse
- "Next Go 'Round" (note the apostrophe), a song by Old Crow Medicine Show from the album Tennessee Pusher
