= Look Away (disambiguation) =

"Look Away" is a 1988 song by the American rock band Chicago.

Look Away may also refer to:

== Songs ==
- "Look Away" (Big Country song), 1986
- "Look Away" (Darude song), 2019 song that represented Finland in the Eurovision Song Contest 2019
- "Look Away", 1994 song by Hootie & The Blowfish from their album Cracked Rear View
- "Look Away", 1996 song by Iggy Pop from his album Naughty Little Doggie
- "Lookaway", 1996 song by Sepultura from their album Roots
- "Lookaway", 2010 song by James from their album The Morning After
- "Look Away", 1966 song by The Spencer Davis Group from their album The Second Album
- "Look Away", theme song for the 2017 TV series A Series of Unfortunate Events, by Neil Patrick Harris
- "Look Away", 2018 song by Old Crow Medicine Show from their album Volunteer
- "Look Away", 2019 song by Stephen Puth
- "Look Away", 1974 song by The Ozark Mountain Daredevils from their album It'll Shine When It Shines

== Other ==
- Look Away!, album by Doc and Merle Watson
- Look Away + 4, EP and its title song from Apples in Stereo
- Look Away, 1973 play by Jerome Kilty
- Look Away (2018 film), a Canadian film written and directed by Assaf Bernstein
- Look Away (2021 film), a film by Sky Documentaries about sexual abuse in the rock music industry
- "Dixie (song)", song with the refrain "look away"
