= Gill Landry =

American singer-songwriter

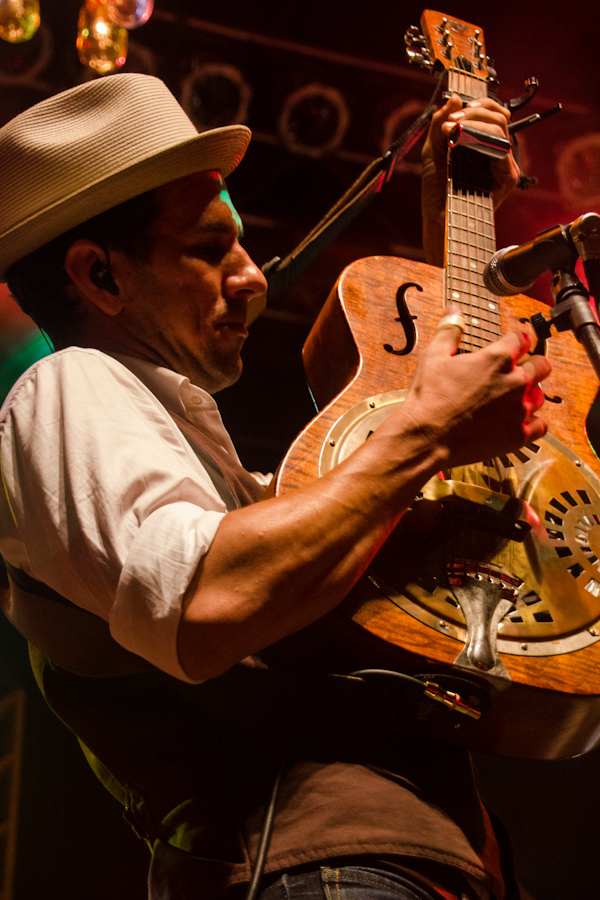
- Playing resonator guitar with Old Crow Medicine Show at 9:30 Club in Washington, D.C., August 2, 2012

Background information
- Also known as: Frank Lemon
- Born: Gilbert John Landry; December 10, 1975 (age 50); Lake Charles, Louisiana, United States
- Genres: Americana; bluegrass; progressive bluegrass
- Occupation: Musician
- Instruments: Guitar, banjo, steel guitar, resonator guitar
- Years active: 1998–present
- Labels: Loose, ATO
- Website: gilllandrymusic.com

Gilbert John Landry (born December 10, 1975), also known by the stage name of Frank Lemon, is an American singer-songwriter and guitarist born in Lake Charles, Louisiana. He is a former member of Old Crow Medicine Show and a founding member of the Kitchen Syncopators. In March 2015 he released his third album, the self-titled Gill Landry, and in October 2017 came Love Rides a Dark Horse released by ATO Records and Loose Music.

== Biography ==
=== Early days ===
Gill Landry got his first guitar when he was 5. After spending many years busking the streets of New Orleans, the Northwest, and Europe, he started The Kitchen Syncopators with his friend Woody Pines in 1998. As he tells the story:

The Kitchen Syncopators came out of a Vaudeville show that Me, Felix Hatfield, Woody Pines, and Huck Notari were doing called The Songsters. It was a Bread and Puppet—inspired cardboard theater which featured a lot of early American music we were picking up off of our friend Baby Gramps.

Those songs would come in handy later when they'd moved to the Pacific Northwest. Landry recounts:

We'd been starving in shacks in Eugene, Oregon, when me and Woody went to the Oregon Country Fair one day to try busking. I think we made $300 bucks that day, which to us was a fortune at the time.

The Kitchen Syncopators recorded seven self-released CDs:

- The Kitchen Syncopators
- Jug Band and Rag Time
- Tijuana Zebra
- Pepper In My Shoe (2003)
- Yazoo City Strugglers (2004)
- Underwood (2005)
- Live From Sedona (2006)

=== Old Crow Medicine Show ===
Gill began to fill in for Critter Fuqua, lending vocals, banjo and steel guitar for Old Crow Medicine Show, joining them on tour in Europe in 2005 and appearing at the Cambridge Folk Festival. As Landry tells it:

Our mutual friend, Sam Parton, suggested I give Ketch a call. So, I did, and he...asked me how my clawhammer and dobro playing was, and I said it was rusty but good. I didn't even own a banjo at the time and hadn't heard of clawhammer before. I was a guitar player."

Recovering quickly, he "went to a place called The Folkstore in Seattle, and bought a Goodtime banjo." He got a five-minute lesson from the store owner, then "practiced it for two weeks before I went to meet the boys. I played it on the Opry and at Doc Watson days. I must have just been god awful (sic)." Something must have worked, because "they kept calling me back.

When Old Crow co-founder Chris "Critter" Fuqua officially "went on hiatus" from the group in 2007 to pursue "recovery from a longtime alcohol addiction", the group looked to Landry as a replacement. " He toured and recorded with the band until 2015, appearing on Tennessee Pusher (2008), Carry Me Back (2012), and Remedy (2014), for which they won a Grammy Award for Best Folk Album.

Regarding his third solo album, released March 2015, he says: "This album, though holding to a few similar influences as Old Crow, is very much a departure as it is more of a personal journey, musically and lyrically." Landry left Old Crow Medicine Show following the release of this record.

== Solo albums ==
In 2007, Landry released a solo album titled The Ballad of Lawless Soirez on Nettwerk Records. "Coal Black Heaven" from this album was hailed by one reviewer as "something of a hobo haiku to the national collapse and depression looming over every hollowed-out and rusted-through US river town."

In October 2011, he self-released his second solo album titled Piety & Desire — featuring the Felice Brothers, Brandi Carlile, Jolie Holland, Ketch Secor, and Samantha Parton (of The Be Good Tanyas) — where he "creates a whole film and stereo hi-fi noir milieu" by realizing "a dozen rootsy, ambient and mostly catchy hardscrabble southwestern tinged originals."

"Recorded in a south Nashville apartment and produced by Landry himself, the album pitches its tent in the four-way intersection between Dylan-inspired folk-rock, atmospheric Americana, dusty cowboy songs and street busker ballads."

— Rolling Stone

His third, self-titled album was released by ATO Records on March 3, 2015. Leaving the "relative security of the popular roots band Old Crow Medicine Show" and suffering a "tough breakup with a one-time fiancée," forced a reevaluation of Landry's life helping to generate the "introspective, generally dark songs that pour out of him' on this album. Landry says of his "map out of the darkness":

The characters in the songs – some living, some dead – are all pulled from my life. Some are very specific, and others relate to the wide range of both good and bad hearts I've had the pleasure of meeting over the years. I tried to write from a perspective in which there was no blame. These songs are searchers looking for some semblance of truth in a shifting and messy landscape.

=== Love Rides a Dark Horse (2017) ===
Love Rides a Dark Horse was released by ATO Records & Loose in October 2017. Landry says of the impetus for the album:

I’d like to believe love always wins coming down the stretch – it just might not be the way you envisioned it. In my experience love often isn't what I expected and wouldn't be half as good as it was. That basically is what I wrote this album about.

The album includes contributions from Ross Holmes on fiddle (Mumford & Sons, Bruce Hornsby), Skylar Wilson on keyboard (Andrew Combs, Rayland Baxter), and Logan Matheny on drums (Roman Candle, The Rosebuds). American Songwriter notes "Landry’s looming yet subtle baritone — somewhere between Leonard Cohen, Kris Kristofferson and Dave Alvin — unspool (sic) stories of broken hearts."

== Festivals and tours ==
Landry shared the stage at Americana Music Festival in September 2015 with acts such as Loretta Lynn, Steve Earle, Pokey Lafarge, and Gillian Welch. He opened for Warren Haynes and The Wood Brothers on tour in Fall of 2015.

After touring Sweden in 2016, Landry performed at Twisterella (2016) and both the Latitude Festival in Suffolk, England and Longitude Festival in Ireland in 2017.

In 2017 and 2019 he performed concerts with singer Dianna Agron at the Café Carlyle in New York.

== Film/Video ==
Landry contributed music for the Run Away Dog (2017) soundtrack. He appeared in Austin to Boston (2014), which chronicled four bands riding in five Volkswagen buses across three thousand miles, and featured: Ben Howard, The Staves, Nathaniel Rateliff, and Bear's Den. Landry appeared in Big Easy Express (2012) with his former band, Old Crow Medicine Show. He also appeared at the end of Be Good Tanyas video "The Littlest Birds".
