= Our Community Place =

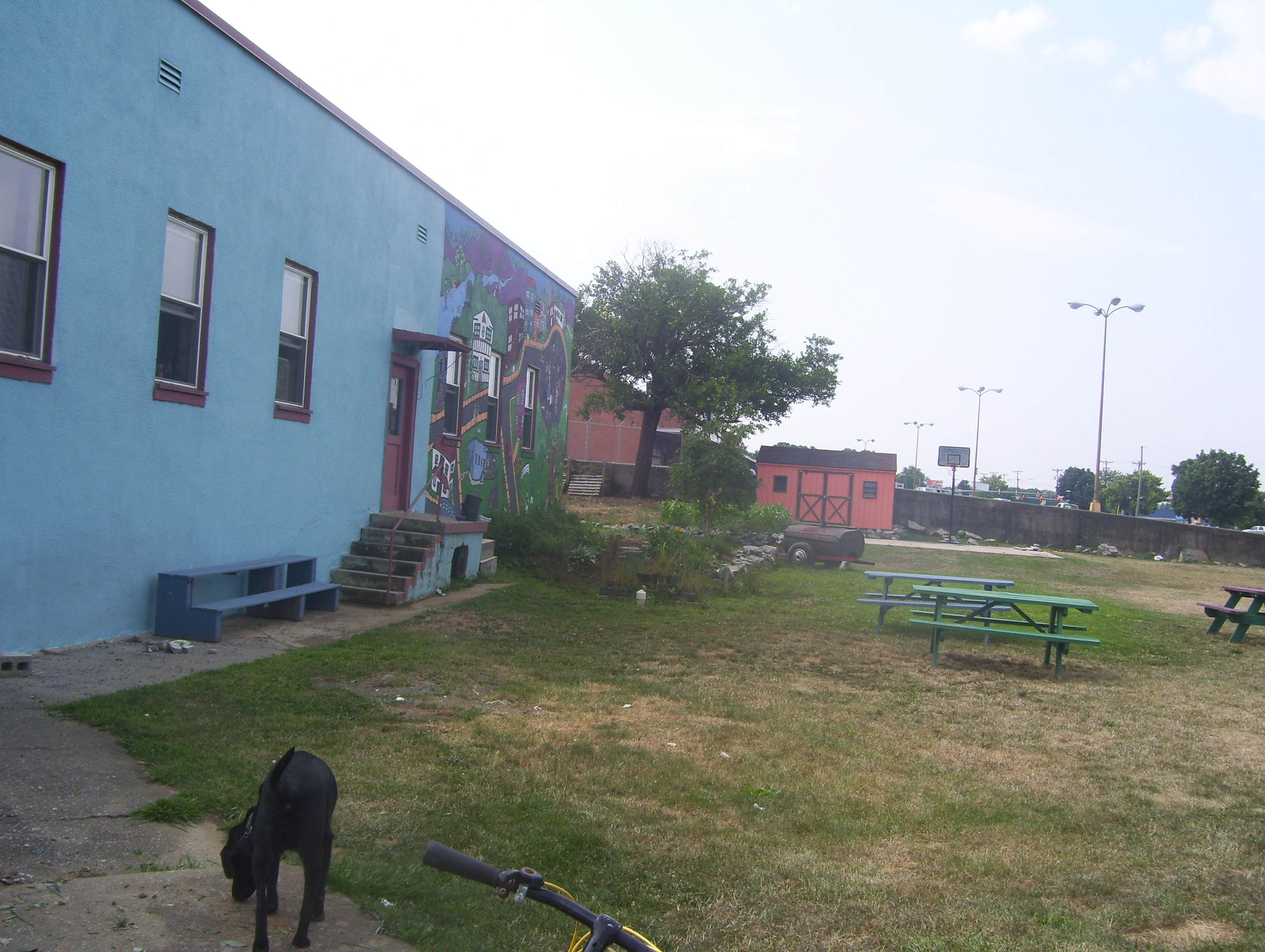
- Building exterior in 2007
- Interactive map of the Our Community Place area
- Alternative names: OCP

General information
- Status: nonprofit
- Type: community center
- Location: 17 East Johnson Street, Harrisonburg, Virginia, United States
- Coordinates: 38.455765°N 78.864641°W
- Elevation: 38.455765
- Groundbreaking: 1999
- Construction started: 2001
- Completed: 2008
- Opened: 2008

Other information
- Seating capacity: 108
- Parking: rear/street

Website
- Our Community Place

References
- EIN 54-1835664

Our Community Place is a community center created by a former Salvation Army building located in Harrisonburg, Virginia, United States. The building was converted to a community center after Ron Copeland acquired ownership in 1999. After a lengthy renovation period, the center opened to the community in August 2008.

== History ==
In 1999, Ron Copeland, owner of the Little Grill diner purchased the then-vacant Salvation Army building at 17 East Johnson Street in Harrisonburg, Virginia — with hopes of creating a community center as an extension of the weekly soup kitchen he operated at his restaurant on Mondays. After a period of rehabbing the building, Our Community Place opened to the Harrisonburg, Virginia community in August 2008.

With Copeland serving as director, OCP staff and volunteers soon became "overworked" by a single aspect of the organizational mission: serving as a day homeless shelter. This led to a decision by the board of directors to close the center temporarily on September 1, 2011.

After a brief "hiatus" to allow for review and redirection, the center reopened October 11, 2011. Copeland said OCP was not undergoing a "reincarnation as a change so much as a refocusing on its original mission."

=== Reopening ===
After reopening, and Philip Fisher Rhodes took over as executive director. Community center hours were significantly reduced. Of this change in leadership, and his additional role as founder-pastor of Early Church — a Mennonite congregation that met at OCP — Copeland said, "I had three full-time jobs, and I gave up two of them. . . I'm very excited to begin focusing on the work of the church I'm a pastor of."

The center, which had been offering its lawn as a place for area homeless to shelter in tents, was forced to end this policy in the summer of 2019 by the City of Harrisonburg. The city made it clear that "under the current laws our zoning does not allow for overnight sheltering.”

This change in availability of space for the homeless to stay forced the city to consider developing other options, while freeing OCP to focus on its priority programs. As Nickels stated:

OCP’s mission is not as an overnight shelter. We’re trying to do this for the community and for folks who are homeless, but once that time period is over we need to go back and exclusively focus on our day programs.

City Manager Eric Campbell stated city staff had been working for months to identify gaps in the local services offered to homeless people and wondering, “How do we begin to address these gaps?”

== Community role ==
OCP operates and manages a community center where community meals, recreation, and work and training opportunities are offered.

=== Meals ===
OCP provides "17,000 meals a year to the city’s homeless and others with food insecurity." It also operates a restaurant every Friday at lunchtime, with a guest chef from a local restaurant or food service preparing the meal.

The center serves 100 people or so at Thanksgiving each year; its volunteers additionally delivered 40 meals to "people in need around the community" in 2022.

Holloway Roofing, based in nearby Weyers Cave, hosts a charity cookout for those in need at OCP each July. This year it wanted to do more to give back during the holiday season. Owner James Holloway says of the effort, “We want to put our money in places where we’re able to actually make an immediate impact right away. We’re affiliated with lots of different ways of giving back and we always try to do that in a way where we’re able to touch the families that need it."

=== Shelter ===
Other shelter services for the homeless in Harrisonburg look to OCP to provide overflow support when the weather turns particularly cold. As Ashley Robinson, shelter director of the Open Door Thermal Shelter, said during a cold snap in January 2022, “What we’ve been looking into is possibly extending hours and working with other organizations like Our Community Place, just trying to keep our unhoused neighbors safe and warm.” The center opens on weekends for such emergency use. OCP extends its hours during extremely cold weather, requiring additional shelter monitors during the day.

OCP also provides relief from the heat of summer. As case management specialist Amanda Morris states: "we provide people kind of a cool place to come in just to hang out and get outside of the heat.”

Providing for affordable housing for all is a major aim included in Harrisonburg's 2039 Vision Plan. In accordance, in November 2021 the City Council agreed that part of the city's $23.8 million in American Rescue Plan Act funds should be used to provide a permanent homeless shelter.

The City of Harrisonburg announced in June 2022 it intended to purchase a 6,730-square-foot building situated on 3.72 acres of land on North Main Street from Shenandoah Presbytery for the purpose of converting the property into a permanent, low-barrier homeless shelter. Nickels stated, “We have an opportunity now as a community to plan comprehensive homeless services. How can we effectively put together those services in a way that really helps folks to move on from homelessness?”

When Open Doors, the low-barrier shelter system housing up to 50 people each night on James Madison University property, ceased operation in August 2022, some "unhoused" Harrisonburg residents were considering other options, including sleeping on the sidewalks around OCP. Center staff participated in a meeting of city and community leaders hosted by Harrisonburg Mayor Deanna Reed to discuss short-term options for providing overnight shelter.

=== Water ===
As part of a new program called “The Humankind Water Drop” Humankind Water set itself the goal of delivering 100,000 liters of water to homeless shelters across the country. In August 2021, the organization donated water to Mercy House in Harrisonburg, whose Executive Director, Shannon Porter, planned on sharing with Our Community Place and the Open Doors shelter. "There's a lot of people on our streets right now that need this type of assistance. It is hot during the day and there is no shelter for them during the day so this is going to be put to use very quickly,” she said.

== Housing ==
OCP began working with Harrisonburg-area landlords in 2020 to help them better understand the needs of its client population as property management companies tend to erect "barriers, making it difficult for those who are low-income, have been previously incarcerated, or have a history of eviction to gain access to equitable housing." This helped advance their aim to:

Move more folks out of chronic homelessness and into these permanent housing units with supportive, ongoing case management to try to help them not fall into the circle of going in and out of housing but to stay in that housing and overcome the barriers they have in life.

In 2020 OCP placed upwards 50+ people in permanent housing. They had "solidified 15 placements" through the Spring of 2021. The center helped 90+ homeless people find housing during the COVID-19.

In December 2021, Nickles announced that OCP had just purchased their first property. "It's sort of a pilot program, so if it works out well, hopefully we will do another one.” As Vance Fowler, 45, who has lived at a property owned by OCP since December 2021, stated:

To have the ability to get in and out the rain, to take a shower when you want to, to go get clean clothes. You would be surprised what you take for granted that homeless people don’t even have a chance at having.

OCP has applied for a special-use permit and rezoning request for another project on Reservoir Street in Harrisonburg, consisting of four units of one-bedroom dwellings for people "transitioning out of homelessness."

In March 2022, OCP was awarded $118,106 of the total the Central Shenandoah Planning District Commission $1.66 million in gap funding to regional developers of affordable housing. “These monies will cover half the cost for Our Community Place to build two efficiency apartments for the most vulnerable and low-income homeless persons in our region,” Nickels said.

== Garden ==
OCP operates a community garden on half an acre between two houses nearby the center.

== Funding ==
In support of the important role OCP plays in the Harrisonburg-area, the Rockingham County budget for fiscal year 2023 includes $15,000 for the center and its programs.

In addition to the Friday Lunch Restaurant (originally Night Out) and Box Lunch Catering, fundraising OCP participates in the Harrisonburg-Rockingham County Great Community Give each year. In April 2022 over $50,000 was collected by OCP out of a total of $1.72 million raised during the event. From 2003, and for years thereafter, OCP sponsored a plant sale with live music, also in April.

During the COVID-19 shutdown, OCP decided to combine their two major fundraising events – a Fall Gala and the Christmas Concert – in 2020. Local chef Tassie Pippert worked with the center's cooks to prepare the dinner for the Fall Gala. Ketch Secor of Old Crow Medicine Show and Trent Wagler of The Steel Wheels performed during the live-streamed concert.

OCP pools resources with other Harrisonburg organizations – Mercy House, Open Doors, and the Suitcase Clinic – to "bolster aid . . during the era of COVID-19, which has required an additional level of coordination to keep vulnerable clients safe and healthy." The center benefited from Federal funding through the Coronavirus Aid, Relief and Economic Security (CARES) Act passed by Congress which allowed the center to retain all of its existing staff and giving them "the freedom to hire additional staff to meet the expanded programming needs stemming from the COVID-19 emergency,” said Eric Olson-Getty, director of development and administration.

The center was one of 12 community partners in the Harrisonburg area who received $14,000 out of a total of more than $518,000 as part of the Sentara Healthcare Fall 2022 "Sentara Cares" grant cycle. This funding will go "specifically to our case management program. . allow(ing) case managers to visit folks in their houses. It will help cover transportation costs. So we can work with people in their housing to resolve issues and keep them housed,” Nickels states.

In February 2018, OCP received a $3,000 grant from the Wells Fargo Foundation, proceeds from which they planned to use "to supply nearly 400 meals". The Denton Family Foundation presented OCP with a check for $33,200 on November 16, 2021. The foundation annually hosts a golf tournament to raise money to donate to non-profit organizations in Harrisonburg and Rockingham County. On presenting the check, Terri Denton, whose father established the foundation, said:

For the second time, Impact Ministries of Elkton, Virginia – founded in 2012 by Pastor Brad Lewis in a garage – chose OCP as the organization to sponsor with one of its charity motorcycle rides in 2019. Thirty riders participated in the fundraising event on a Saturday in October, raising over $500 in charitable contributions.

For his seventh birthday on November 21, 2023, Cameron Stone raised hundreds of dollars through a GoFundMe, yard sales, and lemonade stands. He also collected items to donate to OCP, e.g., “Socks, shampoo, toothbrushes, soap, sleeping bags, and tents.”

“A 6-year-old coming up with the idea of just thinking of them and wanting to raise funds for them. They've been really amazed by that,” Symone Bolden, community care and engagement specialist at OCP, said. “What we’re trying to do here is really show that we’re all a part of the community here, and it's going to take all of the community to come together and really address homelessness,” said Matt Tibbles, executive director.

== Solar panels ==
In 2018, Give Solar, a nonprofit organization founded by Jeff Heie, "raises money and seeks grants to provide solar energy to other nonprofits that can benefit from the cost savings that solar energy can provide." After working with Eastern Mennonite University and Gift and Thrift in Harrisonburg, they made solarizing the OCP building their next project. Give Solar was granted $9,000 by the Merck Company Foundation with an additional $9,000 raised through crowdfunding and "affinity groups". In a “solar barn-raising”, $25,000 in solar panels were installed with the help of volunteers. The solar energy collected by these panels was expected to reduce the community center's electric bill by 75 percent, which should amount to about $3,600 a year in savings.

== Personnel ==
Matt Tibbles is the executive director as of July 2023.
