= The Ballad of Lawless Soirez =

Studio album by Gill Landry
- Released: 2007
- Genre: Blues
- Label: Nettwerk

The Ballad of Lawless Soirez is the solo debut album of Louisiana musician Gill Landry, released in 2007 by Nettwerk Records.
