= 50 Years of Blonde on Blonde =

Live album by Old Crow Medicine Show
- Released: April 28, 2017
- Recorded: May 2016
- Venues: CMA Theater, Nashville TN
- Genres: Folk; country
- Length: 65:00
- Label: Columbia
- Producers: Ted Hutt and Ryan Mall

Old Crow Medicine Show chronology
Remedy (2014)	50 Years of Blonde on Blonde (2017)	Volunteer (2018)

Professional ratings
Review scores
Source	Rating
AllMusic	4/5 stars

50 Years of Blonde on Blonde is a live album by Old Crow Medicine Show. It is a track-for-track tribute to Bob Dylan's landmark 1966 double album Blonde on Blonde.

== Production ==
50 Years of Blonde on Blonde was recorded live at the CMA Theater at the Country Music Hall of Fame, in Nashville, Tennessee, in May 2016. The concert coincided with a Hall of Fame exhibit exploring Dylan's time in Nashville. In an interview, band members Ketch Secor and Critter Fuqua described how they had bonded over Dylan's songs as teenagers, and that the 50 Years... project was a natural extension of that collaboration. While the new recording follows the sequence of Dylan's original track-for-track, Old Crow took considerable liberties with the arrangement of individual tracks, for instance reimagining "Pledging My Time" as a "hillbilly breakdown," and "Obviously 5 Believers" as "a manic fiddle riot." The recording was released as an album on April 28, 2017. It was the band's first release on their new label, Columbia Records, which had released Dylan's original album in 1966.

== Personnel ==
- Ketch Secor – Vocals, fiddle, harmonica, banjo, mandolin, guitar
- "Critter" Fuqua – Guitar, vocals, banjo, accordion, dobro, drums
- Kevin Hayes – Guitjo, harmonica & backing vocals on track 1, lead vocals on track 7
- Morgan Jahnig – Upright bass, backing vocals on track 1
- Chance McCoy – Guitar, kazoo, backing vocals, fiddle, dobro, banjo, co-lead vocals on track 12
- Cory Younts – Keyboards, backing vocals, mandolin, drums, marching snare drum, whistle
- Joe Andrews – Banjo, pedal steel guitar, mandolin, dobro, marching bass drum
- Robert Price – Drums on track 10

== Live performances ==
Old Crow Medicine Show undertook a planned 27-date tour in support of 50 Years... in May and June, 2017. Shows were scheduled in the United States, United Kingdom, and the Netherlands.

== Track listing ==
The track listing mirrors that of the original album. All tracks written by Bob Dylan.

No.	Title	Length
1.	"Rainy Day Women #12 & 35"	4:10
2.	"Pledging My Time"	1:57
3.	"Visions of Johanna"	6:55
4.	"One of Us Must Know (Sooner or Later)"	4:59
5.	"I Want You"	3:14
6.	"Stuck Inside of Mobile with the Memphis Blues Again"	7:29
7.	"Leopard-Skin Pill-Box Hat"	3:37
8.	"Just Like a Woman"	4:10
9.	"Most Likely You Go Your Way and I'll Go Mine"	3:37
10.	"Temporary Like Achilles"	3:29
11.	"Absolutely Sweet Marie"	4:33
12.	"4th Time Around"	4:22
13.	"Obviously 5 Believers"	2:47
14.	"Sad Eyed Lady of the Lowlands"	9:27

== See also ==
- List of songs written by Bob Dylan
- List of artists who have covered Bob Dylan songs
