= Old Crow Medicine Show (album) =

Studio album by Old Crow Medicine Show
- Released: February 24, 2004
- Recorded: 2003
- Studio: RCA Studio B (Nashville, Tennessee); Woodland (Nashville, Tennessee)
- Genre: Country; folk; bluegrass
- Label: Nettwerk
- Producer: David Rawlings

Old Crow Medicine Show chronology
Old Crow Medicine Show (2004)	Big Iron World (2006)

Singles from Old Crow Medicine Show
- 1. "Wagon Wheel" Released: February 10, 2004

Professional ratings
Review scores
Source	Rating
Allmusic	3.5/5 stars

Old Crow Medicine Show, or sometimes known as O.C.M.S., is the first studio album released by the acoustic quintet, Old Crow Medicine Show. Songs include obscure traditional tunes and original compositions by group members. The album features their signature tune, "Wagon Wheel", written by frontman Ketch Secor using a Bob Dylan chorus. The album was produced by David Rawlings. Gillian Welch plays drums on two tracks.

== Track listing ==
No.	Title	Writer(s)	Lead vocal	Length
1.	"Tell It to Me"	Traditional	Ketch Secor	2:48
2.	"Big Time in the Jungle"	Critter Fuqua	Critter Fuqua	2:50
3.	"Poor Man"	Traditional	Willie Watson	3:35
4.	"Tear It Down"	Traditional	Watson	2:11
5.	"Hard to Love"	Traditional	Secor	2:31
6.	"CC Rider"	Ma Rainey	Watson	3:51
7.	"Trials and Troubles"	Ketch Secor; Willie Watson	Watson	2:57
8.	"Hard to Tell"	Secor	Secor	3:15
9.	"Take 'Em Away"	Fuqua	Fuqua	3:35
10.	"We're All in This Together"	Secor; Watson	Watson	4:51
11.	"Wagon Wheel"	Bob Dylan; Secor	Secor	3:52

== Personnel ==
- Ketch Secor - Vocals, harmonica, fiddle, banjo
- Willie Watson - Guitar, vocals, banjo
- Critter Fuqua - Banjo, vocals, guitar
- Kevin Hayes - Guitjo
- Morgan Jahnig - Upright bass
- Gillian Welch - Drums (tracks 2 & 7)
- David Rawlings - Guitar (track 11)

== Chart performance ==
Chart (2004)	Peak position
U.S. Billboard Top Bluegrass Albums	1
U.S. Billboard Top Country Albums	68

== Credits ==
=== The band ===
- Critter Fuqua - Vocals, Banjo, Guitar, Bottleneck Guitar
- Kevin Hayes - Guit-jo
- Morgan Jahnig - Upright Bass
- Ketcham Secor - Vocals, Harmonica, Fiddle, Banjo
- Willie Watson - Vocals, Guitar, Banjo

=== Guest musicians ===
- David Rawlings - Guitar on track 11
- Gillian Welch - Drums on tracks 2 and 7

=== Production ===
- David Rawlings - Producer
- Matt Andrews - Engineer
- Hank Williams - Mastering

=== Artwork ===
- Danny Clinch - Photography, Cover Photo
- Arianna Mercer - Photography

== Releases ==
year	format	label	catalog #
2004	CD	Nettwerk	30349
2004	CD	Nettwerk	092460
2006	CD	Nettwerk	303492
2004	CD	EMI	5982352
