= Remedy (Old Crow Medicine Show album) =

Studio album by Old Crow Medicine Show
- Released: July 1, 2014
- Genre: Folk; country
- Label: ATO
- Producer: Ted Hutt

Old Crow Medicine Show chronology
Carry Me Back (2012)	Remedy (2014)	50 Years of Blonde on Blonde (2017)

Professional ratings
Review scores
Source	Rating
Allmusic	4/5 stars

Remedy is the fifth studio album by the folk, country and old-time music band Old Crow Medicine Show. The album, produced by Ted Hutt, was released on July 1, 2014. It won the 2015 Grammy Award for Best Folk Album. The album is the band's first to feature Chance McCoy and their last with Gill Landry. Remedy also marks the return of founder member Critter Fuqua to the band's line-up.

== Track listing ==
No.	Title	Writer(s)	Lead vocal	Length
1.	"Brushy Mountain Conjugal Trailer"	Ketch Secor	Secor	3:50
2.	"8 Dogs 8 Banjos"	Secor	Fuqua	2:51
3.	"Sweet Amarillo"	Bob Dylan, Critter Fuqua, Secor	Secor	3:22
4.	"Mean Enough World"	Secor	Secor	3:19
5.	"Dearly Departed Friend"	Secor	Secor	4:26
6.	"Firewater"	Fuqua, Chance McCoy, Secor	Fuqua	3:14
7.	"Brave Boys"	Kevin Hayes, Morgan Jahnig, Secor	Fuqua, Secor	2:40
8.	"Doc's Day"	Fuqua, Secor	Fuqua	3:20
9.	"O Cumberland River"	Fuqua, McCoy, Secor	Secor	3:21
10.	"Tennessee Bound"	Secor	Secor	2:49
11.	"Shit Creek"	Fuqua, Hayes, Jahnig, McCoy, Secor	Secor	3:24
12.	"Sweet Home"	Hayes, Secor	Hayes	2:49
13.	"The Warden"	Felix Hatfield, Gill Landry	Landry	3:28

== Personnel ==
- Ketch Secor - Vocals, harmonica, mandolin, fiddle, piano, banjo, percussion
- Critter Fuqua - Banjo, vocals, spoons, accordion, banjo, guitar, percussion
- Chance McCoy - Guitar, vocals, hambone, mandolin, dulcimer, percussion, fiddle
- Gill Landry - Dobro, vocals, banjo, pedal steel, steel guitar, lead vocal on track 13
- Cory Younts - Drums, vocals, mandolin, percussion, Jew's harp, harmonica
- Kevin Hayes - Guitjo, vocals, percussion, lead vocal on track 12
- Morgan Jahnig - Bass, vocals, chimes, percussion
- Bucky Baxter - Pedal steel on track 6
- Ted Hutt - Percussion on track 13

== Chart performance ==
Chart (2014)	Peak position
US Billboard 200	15
US Top Country Albums (Billboard)	4
US Americana/Folk Albums (Billboard)	1
US Independent Albums (Billboard)	2
