= Big Iron World =

Studio album by Old Crow Medicine Show
- Released: August 29, 2006
- Genre: Folk; country
- Label: Nettwerk Records
- Producer: David Rawlings

Old Crow Medicine Show chronology
Old Crow Medicine Show (2004)	Big Iron World (2006)	Tennessee Pusher (2008)

Professional ratings
Review scores
Source	Rating
About.com	link
AllMusic	link
Artistdirect	link
PopMatters	link
Plug In Music	B link
Slant Magazine	link

Big Iron World is the second studio album by folk/country/old timey band Old Crow Medicine Show, released on August 29, 2006. The album was produced by David Rawlings who is best known for being Gillian Welch's musical partner. Welch herself plays drums on four tracks on the album.

== Track listing ==
No.	Title	Writer(s)	Lead vocal	Length
1.	"Down Home Girl"	Jerry Lieber; Artie Butler	Willie Watson	3:48
2.	"Cocaine Habit"	Traditional	Ketch Secor	2:32
3.	"Minglewood Blues"	Noah Lewis	Watson	2:51
4.	"My Good Gal"	Ketch Secor	Secor	4:19
5.	"James River Blues"	Critter Fuqua; Secor; Watson; David Rawlings	Critter Fuqua	3:07
6.	"New Virginia Creeper"	Fuqua; Secor	Fuqua	2:21
7.	"Union Maid"	Woody Guthrie	Secor	2:36
8.	"Let It Alone"	Traditional	Kevin Hayes	3:02
9.	"God's Got It"	Secor; Watson; Rawlings	Watson	2:39
10.	"I Hear Them All"	Secor; Rawlings	Secor	3:05
11.	"Don't Ride That Horse"	Secor; Rawlings	Watson	3:04
12.	"Bobcat Tracks"	Fuqua; Secor; Rawlings	Fuqua	3:04

== Chart performance ==
Chart (2006)	Peak position
U.S. Billboard Top Bluegrass Albums	1
U.S. Billboard Top Country Albums	27
U.S. Billboard 200	125
U.S. Billboard Top Heatseekers	2

== Personnel ==
- Ketch Secor - Vocals, harmonica, fiddle, banjo
- Willie Watson - Guitar, vocals, banjo
- Critter Fuqua - Banjo, vocals, slide guitar
- Kevin Hayes - Guitjo, vocals on "Let It Alone"
- Morgan Jahnig - Upright bass
- David Rawlings - Guitar (tracks 4 & 10)
- Gillian Welch - Drums (tracks 5,6,10 & 11)
