= Carry Me Back =

Studio album by Old Crow Medicine Show
- Released: July 17, 2012
- Studio: Sound Emporium (Nashville, TN)
- Genre: Folk; country
- Length: 37:01
- Label: ATO Records
- Producer: Ted Hutt

Old Crow Medicine Show chronology
Tennessee Pusher (2008)	Carry Me Back (2012)	Remedy (2014)

Professional ratings
Review scores
Source	Rating
Allmusic	link

Carry Me Back is the fourth studio album by folk/country/old time band Old Crow Medicine Show, released on July 17, 2012. It was the group's first release on ATO Records, and their first album produced by Ted Hutt. The album was the band's last to feature founding-member Willie Watson, and the first to feature multi-instrumentalist Cory Younts.

== Track listing ==
No.	Title	Writer(s)	Lead vocal	Length
1.	"Carry Me Back to Virginia"	Ketch Secor, Kevin Hayes, Willie Watson	Secor	2:40
2.	"We Don't Grow Tobacco"	Secor, Watson	Watson	3:55
3.	"Levi"	Secor	Secor	2:50
4.	"Bootlegger's Boy"	Secor	Secor	3:26
5.	"Ain't it Enough"	Secor, Jason White, Watson	Secor	3:59
6.	"Mississippi Saturday Night"	Gill Landry, Secor	Secor	3:01
7.	"Steppin' Out"	Landry, Felix Hatfield	Landry	2:15
8.	"Genevieve"	Landry	Landry	2:28
9.	"Country Gal"	Hayes, Secor	Hayes	2:44
10.	"Half Mile Down"	Secor, Jim Lauderdale	Secor	3:01
11.	"Sewanee Mountain Catfight"	Secor, Watson, Hayes, Cory Younts, Morgan Jahnig	Secor	2:25
12.	"Ways of Man"	Secor	Secor	4:20

== Personnel ==
Old Crow Medicine Show

- Kevin Hayes - guitjo, vocals
- Morgan Jahnig - bass, percussion
- Gill Landry - banjo, vocals, dobro, resophonic guitar
- Ketch Secor - fiddle, vocals, harmonica, guitar, banjo
- Willie Watson - guitar, vocals, banjo, percussion
- Cory Younts - mandolin, vocals, percussion, guitar, keyboards

Special Guests

- Critter Fuqua - accordion on "Ways of Man", harmony vocals on "Country Gal"
- Jim Lauderdale - harmony vocals on "Ways of Man"

== Chart performance ==
Chart (2012)	Peak position
U.S. Billboard 200	22
U.S. Billboard Top Bluegrass Albums	1
U.S. Billboard Top Country Albums	4
U.S. Billboard Top Folk Albums	1
U.S. Billboard Top Independent Albums	5
