= Volunteer (Old Crow Medicine Show album) =

Studio album by Old Crow Medicine Show
- Released: April 20, 2018
- Genre: Folk
- Length: 37:50
- Label: Columbia Nashville
- Producer: Dave Cobb

Old Crow Medicine Show chronology
50 Years of Blonde on Blonde (2017)	Volunteer (2018)	Paint This Town (2022)

Volunteer is the sixth studio album by folk band Old Crow Medicine Show. It was released in April 2018 by Columbia Nashville. The album is the band's only one to feature Joe Andrews, who plays on every track and subsequently became a full band member. It is the last album to feature founding members Kevin Hayes and Critter Fuqua as well as Chance McCoy, all of whom departed the group prior to the release of their next album Paint This Town.

== Critical reception ==
Professional ratings
Aggregate scores
Source	Rating
Metacritic	85/100
Review scores
Source	Rating
AllMusic	4.5/5 stars

The album received a Metacritic score of 85 based on 6 critics, indicating universal acclaim.

== Commercial performance ==
The album debuted at No. 14 on Top Country Albums, No. 1 on Bluegrass Albums, and No. 7 on Americana/Folk Albums, with 7,000 equivalent album units (6,500 in traditional album sales) in its first week. It is Old Crow Medicine Show's seventh No. 1 on the Bluegrass Albums chart, tying with Ricky Skaggs and Rhonda Vincent for the most No. 1s in the history of chart. It has sold 11,500 copies in the United States as of June 2018.

== Track listing ==
No.	Title	Writer(s)	Lead vocal	Length
1.	"Flicker & Shine"	Ketch Secor, Kevin Hayes	Secor	2:23
2.	"A World Away"	Secor, Critter Fuqua, Chance McCoy	Secor	3:19
3.	"Child of the Mississippi"	Secor, Fuqua, McCoy	Secor	5:00
4.	"Dixie Avenue"	Secor, Fuqua	Fuqua	2:35
5.	"Look Away"	Secor	Secor	5:10
6.	"Shout Mountain Music"	Secor, McCoy	Fuqua	2:31
7.	"The Good Stuff"	Hayes	Hayes	2:42
8.	"Old Hickory"	Secor, Fuqua	Secor	5:09
9.	"Homecoming Party"	Secor	Secor	3:06
10.	"Elzick's Farewell"	Traditional	Instrumental	1:51
11.	"Whirlwind"	Secor	Secor	4:04

== Personnel ==
- Ketch Secor - Vocals, fiddle, harmonica, resophonic plectrum, banjo, guitar.
- Critter Fuqua - Acoustic, electric and slide guitars, banjo, vocals, drums.
- Chance McCoy - Acoustic, 12 string, classical and electric guitars, vocals, fiddle.
- Cory Younts - Mandolin, vocals, drums, percussion, piano.
- Kevin Hayes - Guitjo, lead vocal on track 7.
- Morgan Jahnig - Bass, baritone guitar, vocals.
- Joe Andrews - Ukulele, banjo, mandolin, pedal steel, guitar, vocals.
- Dave Cobb - Percussion tracks 2 and 3, guitar tracks 5 and 9.

== Charts ==
Chart (2018)	Peak position
US Billboard 200	100
US Americana/Folk Albums (Billboard)	7
US Top Bluegrass Albums (Billboard)	1
US Top Country Albums (Billboard)	14
