= Little Grill Collective =

Restaurant in Harrisonburg, Virginia, US

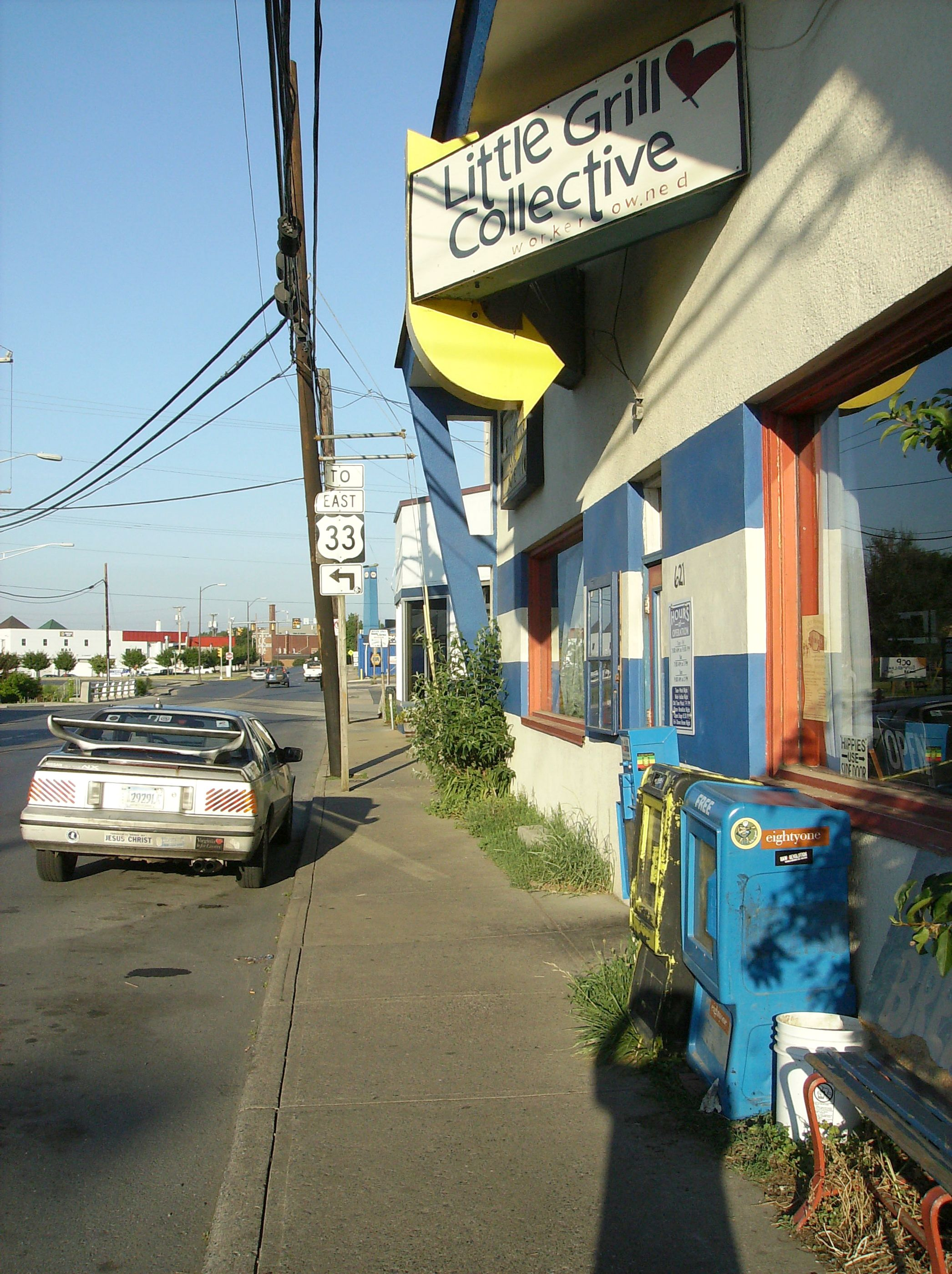
- South on N. Main Street (Rte 11)
- Interactive map of Little Grill Collective

Restaurant information
- Established: June 2003
- Owner: worker-owned cooperative
- Food type: healthy home-cooked
- Location: 621 North Main Street, Harrisonburg, Rockingham, Virginia, 22802
- Coordinates: 38.456147°N 78.864302°W
- Seating capacity: 48
- Website: littlegrillcollective.com

The Little Grill is a restaurant in Harrisonburg, Virginia. The establishment opened in June 2003

It was a worker owned collective from 2003 to 2022. After ceasing operations in September 2022, previous owners Ron and Melaine Copeland reopened the diner as "The Little Grill" on March 21, 2023.

== History ==
The Little Grill has been a restaurant in Harrisonburg, Virginia, since the 1940s; before that it was an antique store in the 1930s and a communal bathhouse for a nearby swimming pool in the 1920s. In the early 1980s, Christopher Boyer, working for then owner and "master chef" Maria Prytula, a Ukrainian-born artist and poet (d. 2012) They started renting the place out on weekend nights to present rock shows and theater. The restaurant's "hippified" atmosphere began during this period. Chris bought the restaurant in 1985 with blues musician and Little Grill cook, Bob Driver. The diner became a full-service restaurant serving three meals a day, with live entertainment on the weekends. John Eckman bought out Boyer's share of the business in 1986, and he and Driver sold the restaurant to Tom Kildea in 1990. Kildea sold the restaurant to his former employee Ron Copeland in 1992.

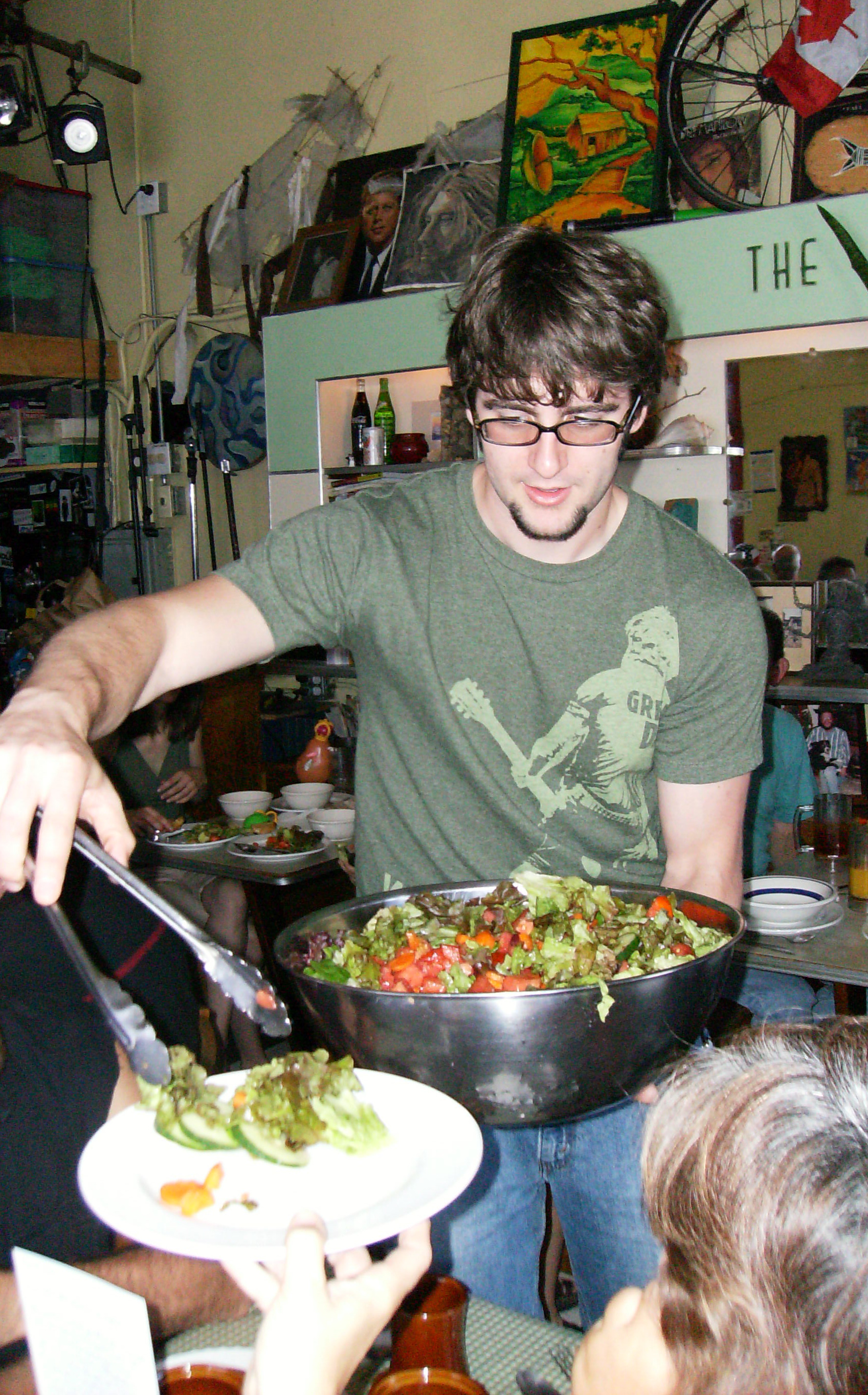
Salad being served at the Free Food For All Soup Kitchen in 2008

=== Worker-owned cooperative ===
From 2003 to 2022, the restaurant was a worker owned collective. The collective was known for its quirky, eclectic, down-home atmosphere, with boxes of old Trivial Pursuit cards on the tables. As a quaint and cozy music venue, the Grill has served as a launch for musical acts such as The Hackensaw Boys and Old Crow Medicine Show. Little Grill Collective was set up as a worker-owned, democratically managed cooperative, where members have joined together to produce goods and services for sale.

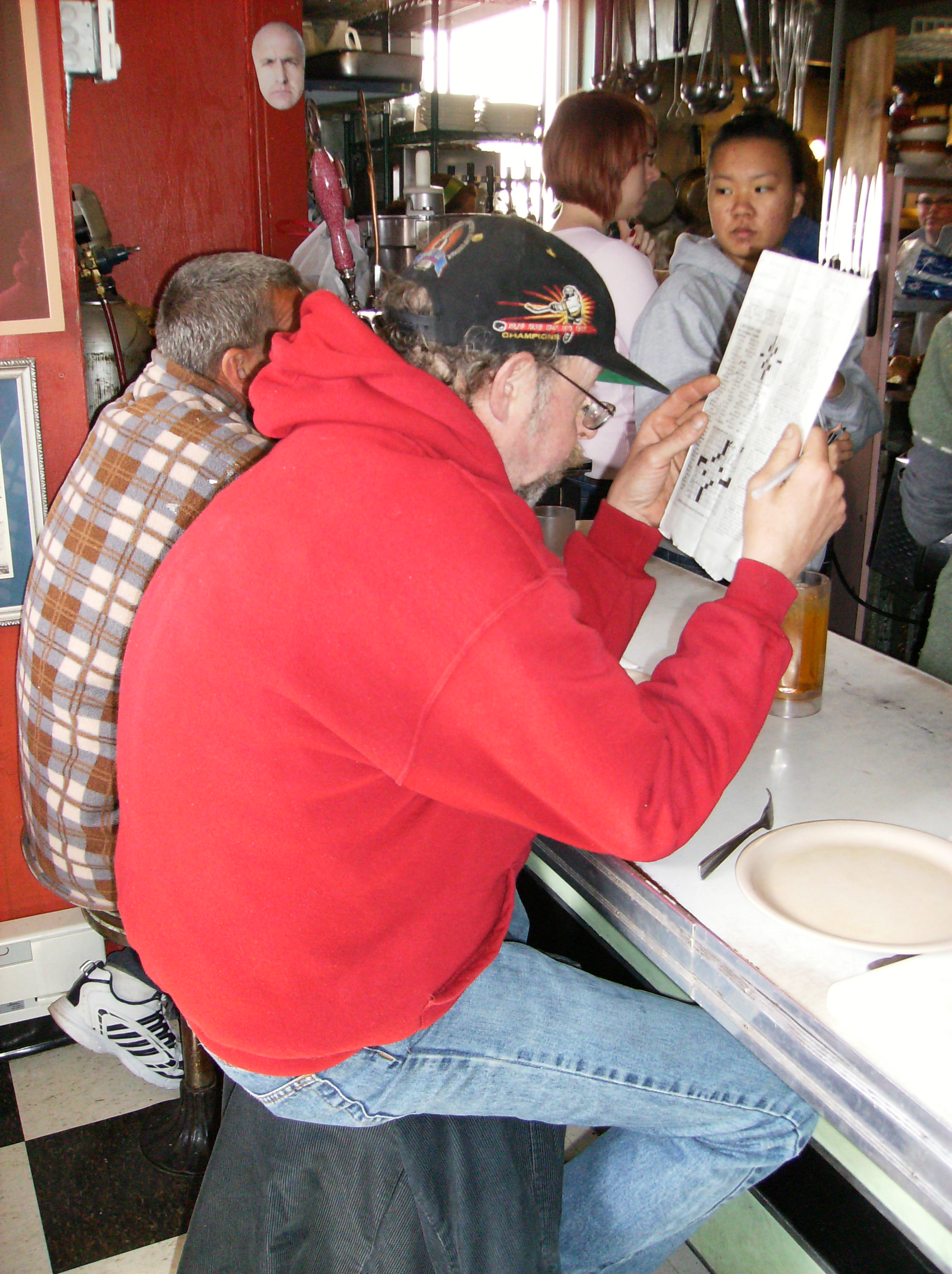
A customer at the Little Grill counter

The owner Ron Copeland decided to attend graduate school, but he didn't want to see The Little Grill close as a result so friends encouraged him to investigate worker-owned cooperatives such as Cheese Board Collective in Berkeley, California. Discovering mentorship and guidance there, Copeland and others worked together to launch The Little Grill Collective in 2003. Not everyone who worked at the collective became an owner, but 9–12 of the employees usually signed on for the privilege at any one time. The collective had survived almost two decades when it ceased operations in September 2022, with just five worker-owners lasting until then.

On September 13, 2022, the worker-owners announced they could no longer continue operating in their current form and announced a temporary closure.

=== Previous owners return ===
Ron and Melaine Copeland, who owned The Little Grill from 1992 to 2003—before helping its employees convert it to a worker-owned collective—have signed a lease on the building and intend to restart operations in 2023. Ron discovered The Little Grill, a "staple restaurant with an eighty-year pedigree", as a James Madison University student. He started working there in the mid-1980s, hiring as a dishwasher the woman who would later become his wife and mother of his children.

He and Melaine married in 1994 while running the diner together. The Copelands wanted to ensure that one of Harrisonburg’s most-loved spots survived.

The Copelands have now purchased the business back from the collective, but are dropping the worker-owned aspect of the business. The Copelands reopened the diner as "The Little Grill" in March 2023.

To finance start-up, the returning owners are selling "personal grill accounts" for $1,000 each which can be used to purchase meals and leave tips once the diner reopens.

On February 18, 2023, as part of massive reopening efforts, James Madison University students as part of GIVE (Growth International Volunteer Excursions) Andy Luong, head volunteer coordinator at GIVE, and five other volunteers from James Madison University helped take down the Little Grill sign for refurbishing, power wash exterior walls, and prep the interior for painting.

Both owners are alumni of nearby James Madison University, Ron in 1990 and Melanie in 1992 and both view The Little Grill as an important second home to the JMU community.

They have hired William "Billy" Bleecker, co-chef at Clementine Cafe in downtown Harrisonburg, as general manager.

== Menu ==
Since October 1992, the Little Grill menu aimed at appealing to healthy-minded eaters, vegetarians, and hippies. Tofu is included in several of their breakfast specials, including tofu rancheros, tofu scrambler, tofu burrito, and tofu grinder. Blue Monkey pancakes (bananas and blueberries in buttermilk batter) have inspired a T-shirt, featuring a blue monkey eating pancakes, for sale in the restaurant . ."

=== Special nights ===
Prior to a summer 2015 menu transition, special menu nights at Little Grill happened on set days of the week. Tuesday was Mexi Night, Wednesday was Indian Night or Wildcard Special depending on the chef, Thursday was Breakfast Night, and Friday was Down Home Night/Southern Cookin'.

The Little Grill takes part in the semiannual Taste of Downtown, a week-long event that features lunch and dinner specials at most downtown Harrisonburg restaurants who put together discounted menu offerings and combos as a promotional activity initiated by Harrisonburg Downtown Renaissance, a nonprofit revitalization group, in 2008.

=== Relaunch 2023 ===
In their 2023 return to ownership of the restaurant, the Copelands are committed to preserving what's best from the gustatory traditions, while introducing some surprises to the menu.

== Entertainment ==
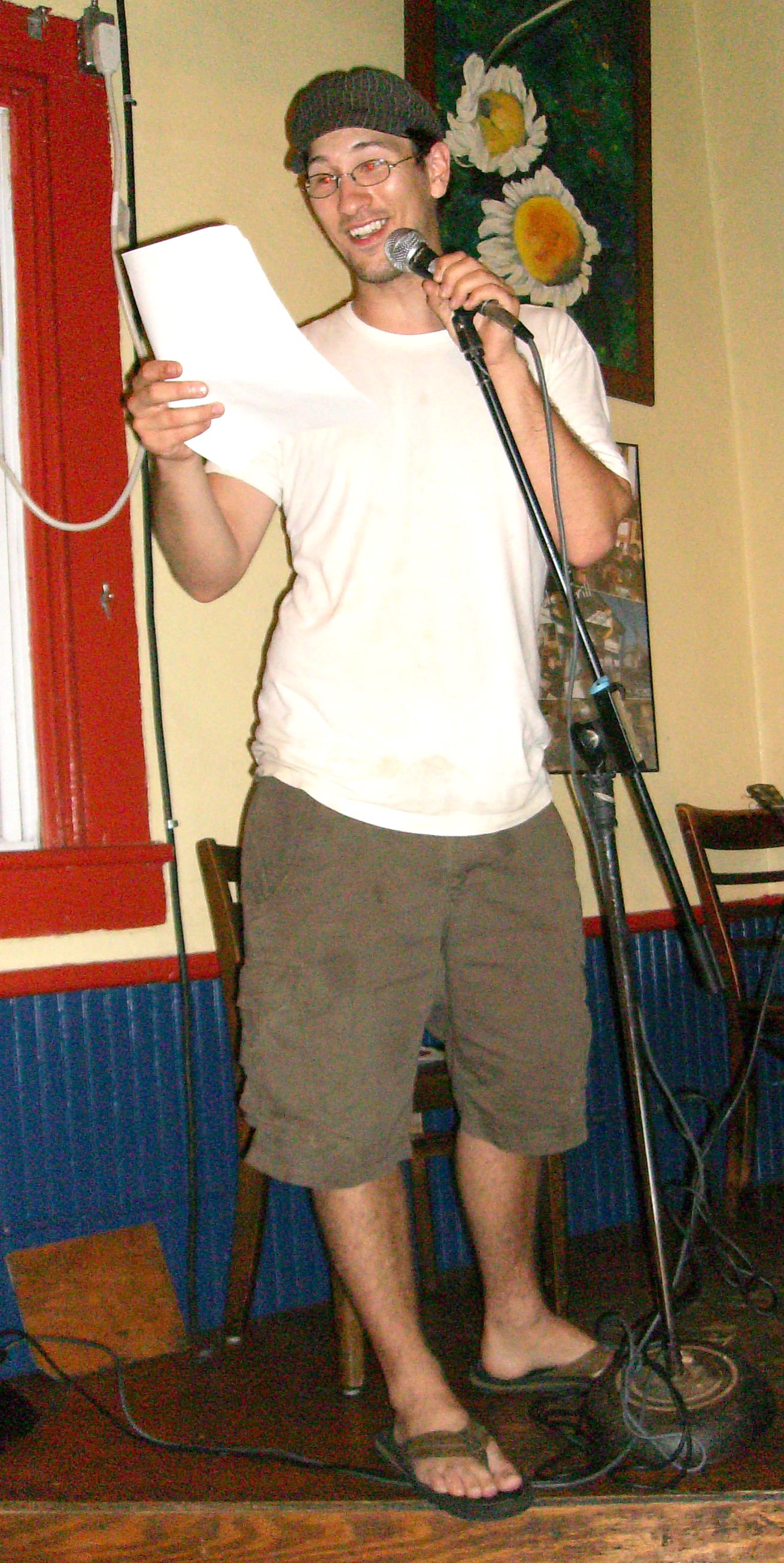
Owner Chris Howdyshell serving as master of ceremonies for open mic, in 2008

Little Grill offered entertainment from local writing, performing, musical, and comedic talents—through regular weekly open stage and special shows. Every Thursday night they would present an open mic for poets, storytellers, comics, and musicians, including students from James Madison University. Historically, the founders of both The Hackensaw Boys and Old Crow Medicine Show—Robert St. Ours, David Sickmen, Rob Bullington, Chris "Critter" Fuqua, Ketch Secor, etc.—met and performed at the Little Grill open mic.

Special shows include fundraisers for local organizations, dramatic works created by owner and open mic emcee Chris Howdyshell, and comedy. The first "Ha-Ha Fest" that occurred in February 2012 is a recent example of these. The Girl Who Died Most Mysteriously, a play with original songs written by Little Grill worker/owner Chris Howdyshell, was performed October 2011—with his musical group The Dish Dogs backing "a local cast of non-actors."

Wednesday nights had previously been reserved for a game of bingo involving diners as players.

== Venue ==
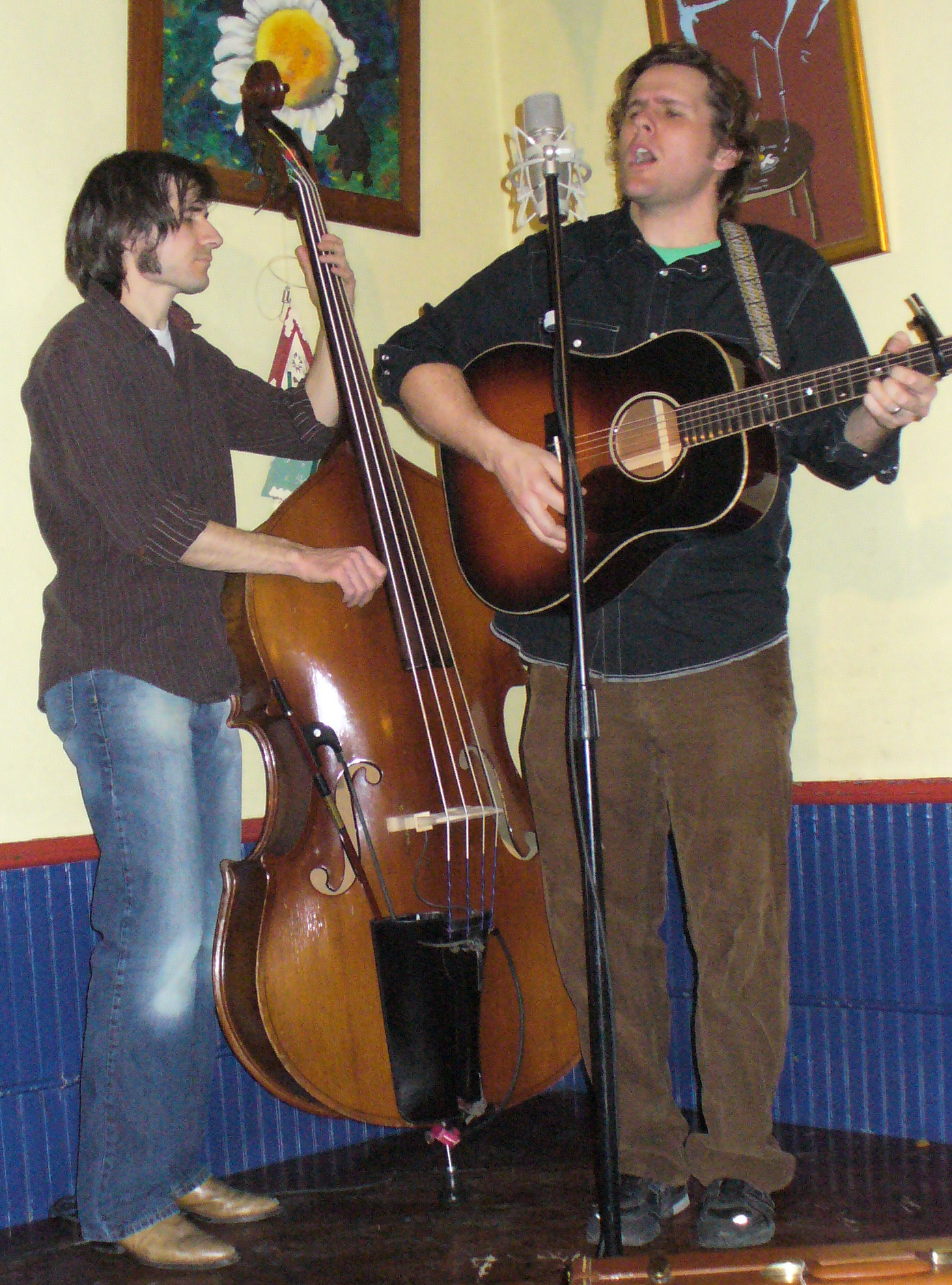
Trent Wagler (guitar) and Brian Dickel (stand-up bass) perform with The Steel Wheels February 6, 2009

Three St. Ours brothers, Chris "Critter" Fuqua, and Ketch Secor founded the Route 11 Boys—precursor group to both The Hackensaw Boys and Old Crow Medicine Show.

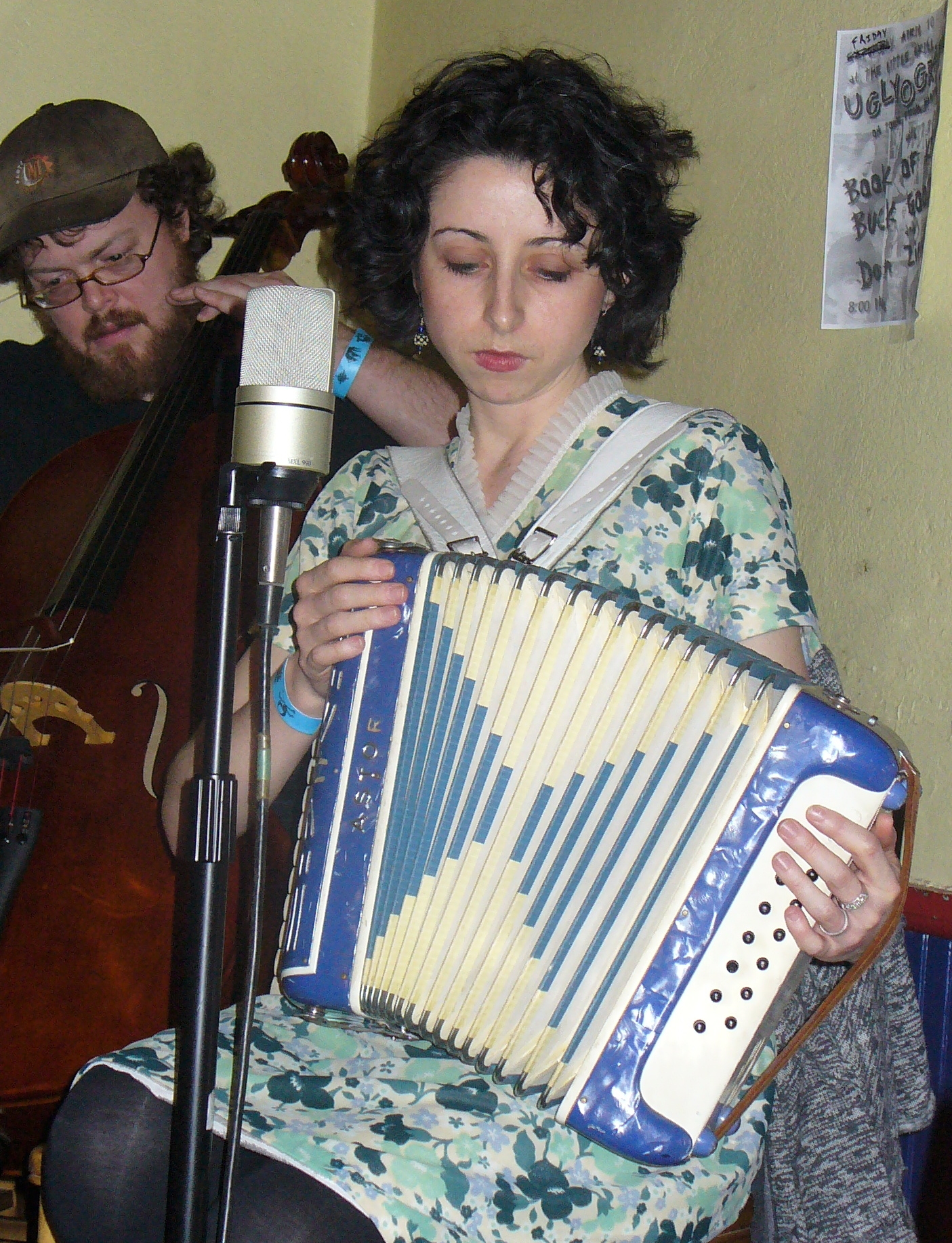
Antonia Begonia performs with Jonathan Vassar on accordion as part of MACRoCk 2009 April 3, 2009

=== Recording ===
The Little Grill venue has been used to record music. Previous owner Tom Kildea recorded his album Love Like Wood there in 1999.

=== MACRoCk ===
Little Grill serves as a venue each year for The Mid-Atlantic College Radio Conference (MACRoCk), joining other downtown Harrisonburg venues Artful Dodger, Blue Nile, Clementine, Court Square Theater, and Downtown 34 Music (in 2011).

Including workshops, panels, and a label exposition, this college radio festival is funded by grass-roots businesses.

Musical acts that performed during the 2011 festival at Little Grill included: Low Branches, Bison, Wailin' Storms, Spirit Family Reunion, Auld Lang Syne, Luke Saunders, and Cat Magic Co. The Daily News-Record describes MACRoCk as an:

... eclectic mix of bands brings thousands of independent music enthusiasts to downtown Harrisonburg every spring. Festivalgoers cram into local venues to hear groups from throughout the East Coast jamming out tunes ranging from folk to garage metal and everything in between.

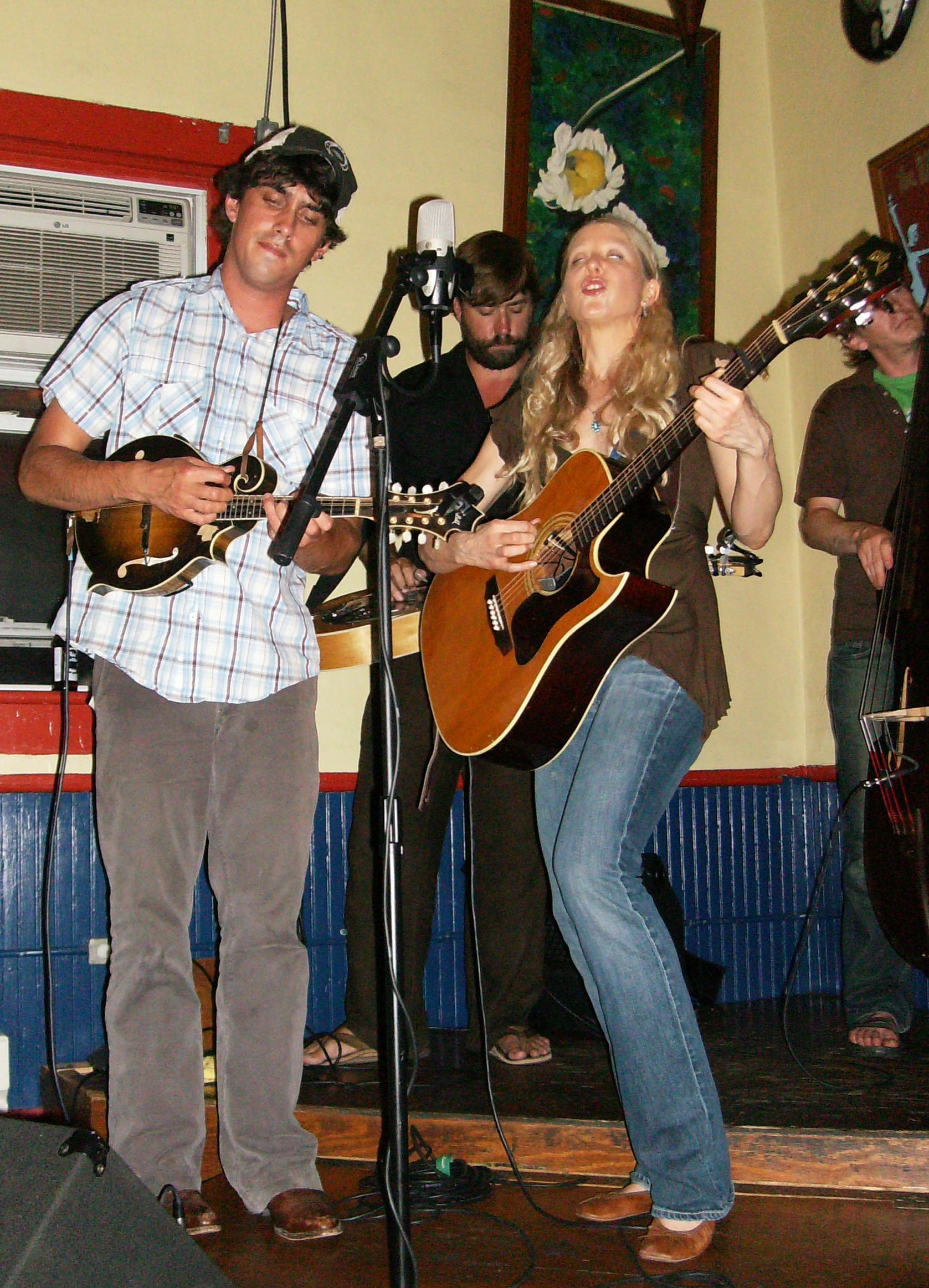
Adrienne Young and Andy Thacker play with her band Little Sadie as fundraiser for FoodRoutes; June 27, 2008

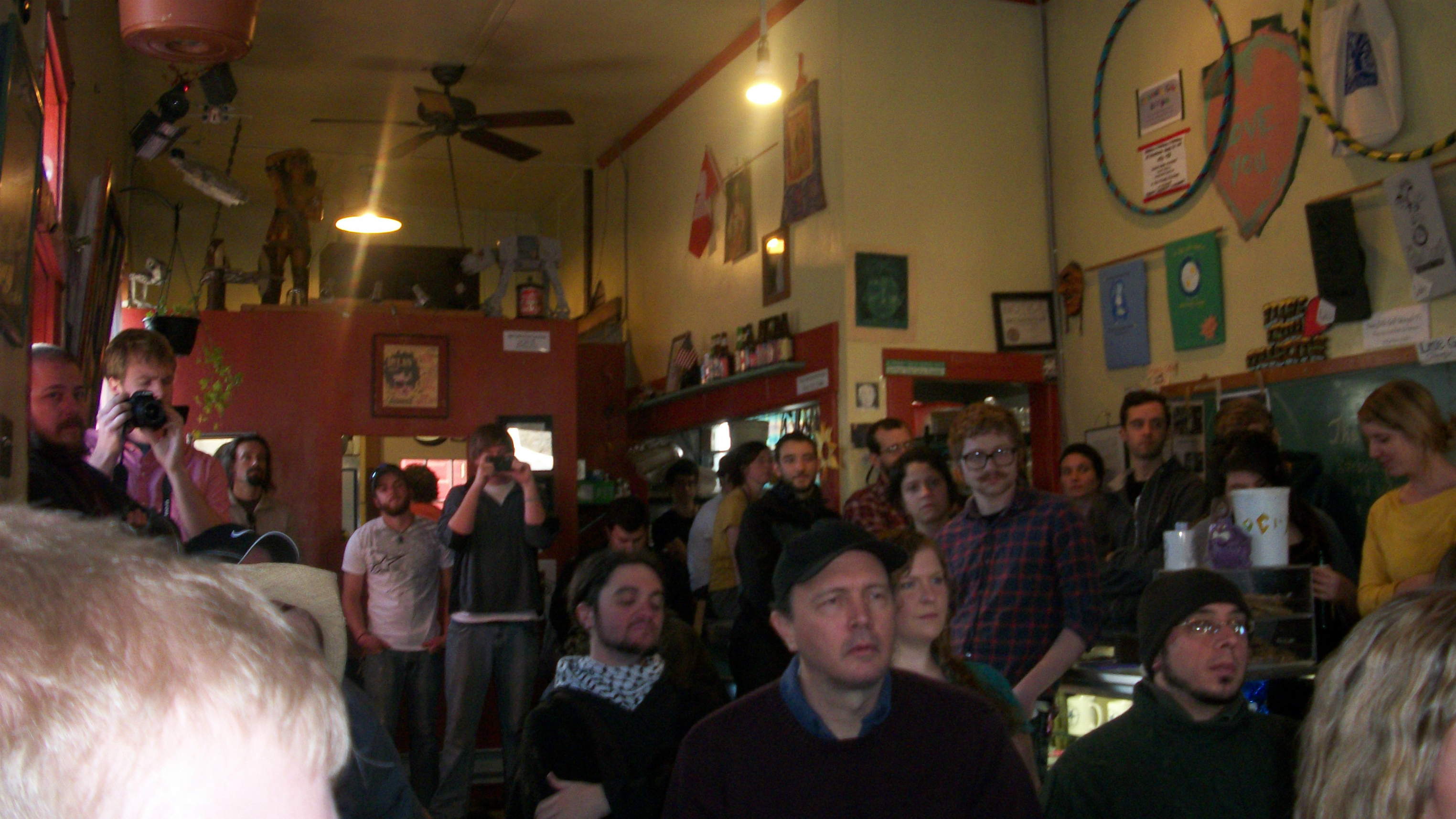
A crowd watches Ketch Secor and Chris 'Critter' Fuqua benefit for Our Community Place January 14, 2012

== Awards, honors, and distinctions ==
- Little Grill was voted Best Breakfast and Best Vegetarian in the 2009, 2010, 2011, 2012, 2013, 2014, 2015, and 2016 Daily News-Record Best of the Valley survey.
