= Tennessee Pusher =

Studio album by Old Crow Medicine Show
- Released: September 23, 2008
- Recorded: Hollywood, California
- Genre: Folk; country
- Label: Nettwerk
- Producer: Don Was

Old Crow Medicine Show chronology
| Big Iron World (2006) | Tennessee Pusher (2008) | Carry Me Back (2012) |

Professional ratings
Review scores
| Source | Rating |
|---|---|
| AllMusic | 3.5/5 stars |
| ChartAttack | link |
| The Guardian | 4/5 stars |

Tennessee Pusher is the third studio album by folk/country/old time band Old Crow Medicine Show. Released on September 23, 2008, the album was produced by Don Was. The album reached #1 on the Billboard Top Bluegrass Albums Chart. The album is the band's first with Gill Landry, who replaced founder member Critter Fuqua. Fuqua provides only backing vocals on the album.

== Track listing ==
| No. | Title | Writer(s) | Lead vocal | Length |
|---|---|---|---|---|
| 1. | "Alabama High-Test" | Ketch Secor | Secor | 2:25 |
| 2. | "Highway Halo" | Secor | Secor | 3:42 |
| 3. | "The Greatest Hustler of All" | Secor, Willie Watson | Watson | 7:04 |
| 4. | "Methamphetamine" | Secor, David Rawlings | Secor | 5:27 |
| 5. | "Next Go 'Round" | Secor, Watson | Watson | 3:38 |
| 6. | "Humdinger" | Hayes | Hayes | 2:29 |
| 7. | "Motel in Memphis" | Secor | Secor | 4:25 |
| 8. | "That Evening Sun" | Secor, Watson | Watson | 3:43 |
| 9. | "Mary's Kitchen" | Gill Landry | Landry | 2:43 |
| 10. | "Crazy Eyes" | Secor, Watson | Secor | 4:17 |
| 11. | "Tennessee Pusher" | Secor | Secor | 5:30 |
| 12. | "Lift Him Up" | Blind Alfred Reed, Watson | Watson | 3:57 |
| 13. | "Caroline" | Secor | Secor | 3:33 |

== Personnel ==
Old Crow Medicine Show

- Kevin Hayes - guitjo, vocals
- Morgan Jahnig - upright bass
- Gill Landry - slide guitar, resonator guitar, vocals
- Ketch Secor - violin, vocals, guitar, harmonica, banjo
- Willie Watson - guitar, vocals, harmonica, violin
- Critter Fuqua - backing vocals

Additional musicians

- Jim Keltner - drums
- Benmont Tench - Hammond C-3 organ

== Chart performance ==
| Chart (2008) | Peak position |
|---|---|
| U.S. Billboard Top Bluegrass Albums | 1 |
| U.S. Billboard Top Country Albums | 7 |
| U.S. Billboard 200 | 50 |
