= Grammy Award for Best Bluegrass Album =

Honor presented to recording artists for quality bluegrass albums

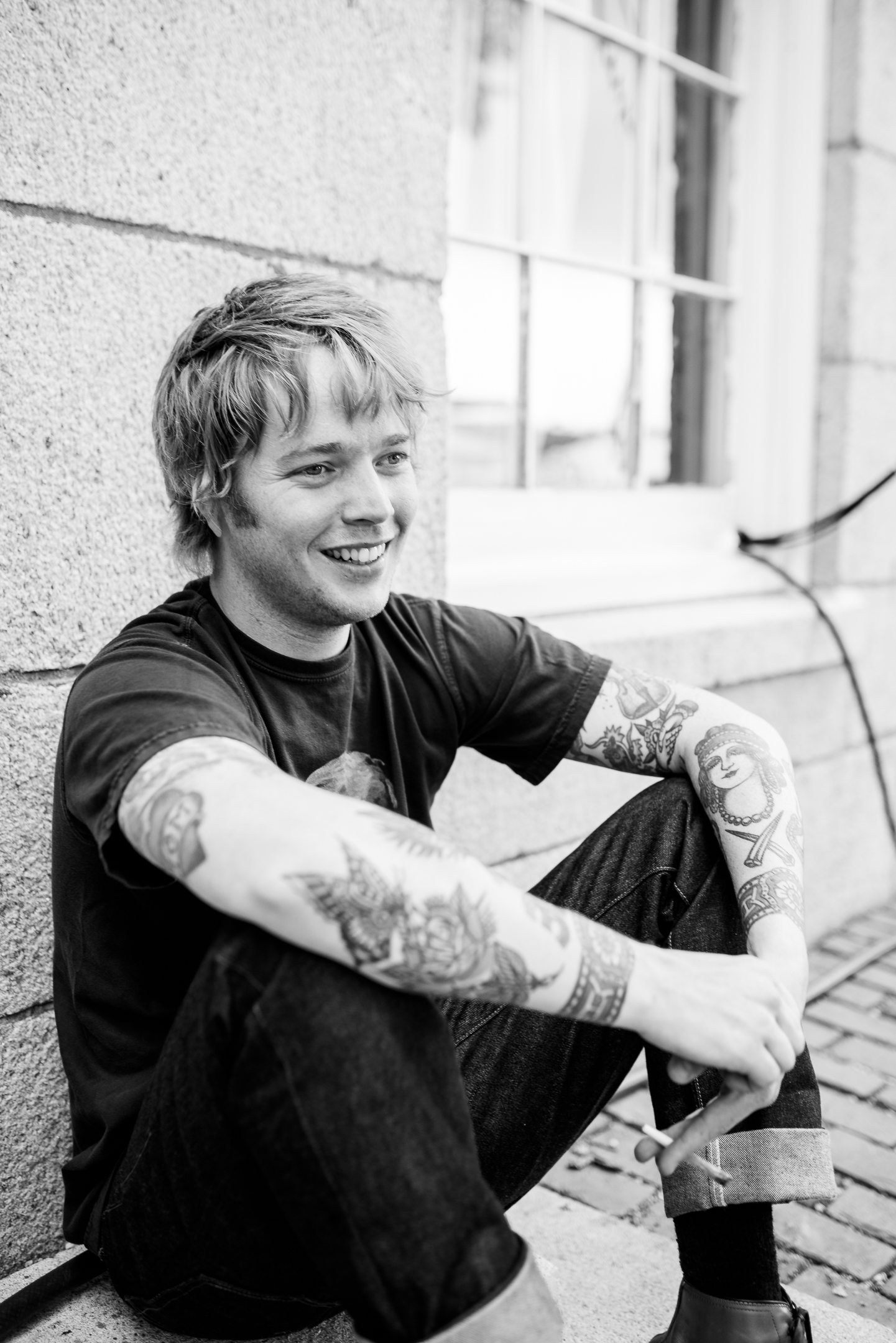
- Highway Prayers by Billy Strings is the most recent recipient
- Awarded for: Quality works in the bluegrass music genre
- Country: United States
- Presented by: National Academy of Recording Arts and Sciences
- First award: 1989
- Currently held by: Billy Strings – Highway Prayers (2026)
- Website: grammy.com

The Grammy Award for Best Bluegrass Album is an award presented at the Grammy Awards, a ceremony that was established in 1958 and originally called the Gramophone Awards, to recording artists for quality works (songs or albums) in the bluegrass music genre. Honors in several categories are presented at the ceremony annually by the National Academy of Recording Arts and Sciences of the United States to "honor artistic achievement, technical proficiency and overall excellence in the recording industry, without regard to album sales or chart position".

Originally called the Grammy Award for Best Bluegrass Recording (Vocal or Instrumental), the award was first presented in 1989. In 1990 and 1991, the category was renamed Best Bluegrass Recording, and in 1990, the award was reserved for singles rather than albums. In 1992 the category was renamed Best Bluegrass Album.

In 1995 and 1997, producers of compilation albums were the only award recipients.

The inaugural recipient of the award was Bill Monroe, widely considered to be the founder of the genre. Alison Krauss has the most wins in the category, with six, including five with her band Union Station who are tied with Ricky Skaggs and Kentucky Thunder for second most wins. Billy Strings has won three times. Jim Lauderdale, Nashville Bluegrass Band, and Molly Tuttle & Golden Highway are the only other acts to have won more than once, with two awards each. Del McCoury holds the record for most nominations, with ten, while Doyle Lawson, Noam Pickelny, Peter Rowan, and The Seldom Scene have the most nominations without a win, with four. In 2018, the first tie in the history of the category occurred, with the award being presented to both Rhonda Vincent and The Infamous Stringdusters. The current recipient of the award is Billy Strings, who won at the 67th Annual Grammy Awards.

== Recipients ==
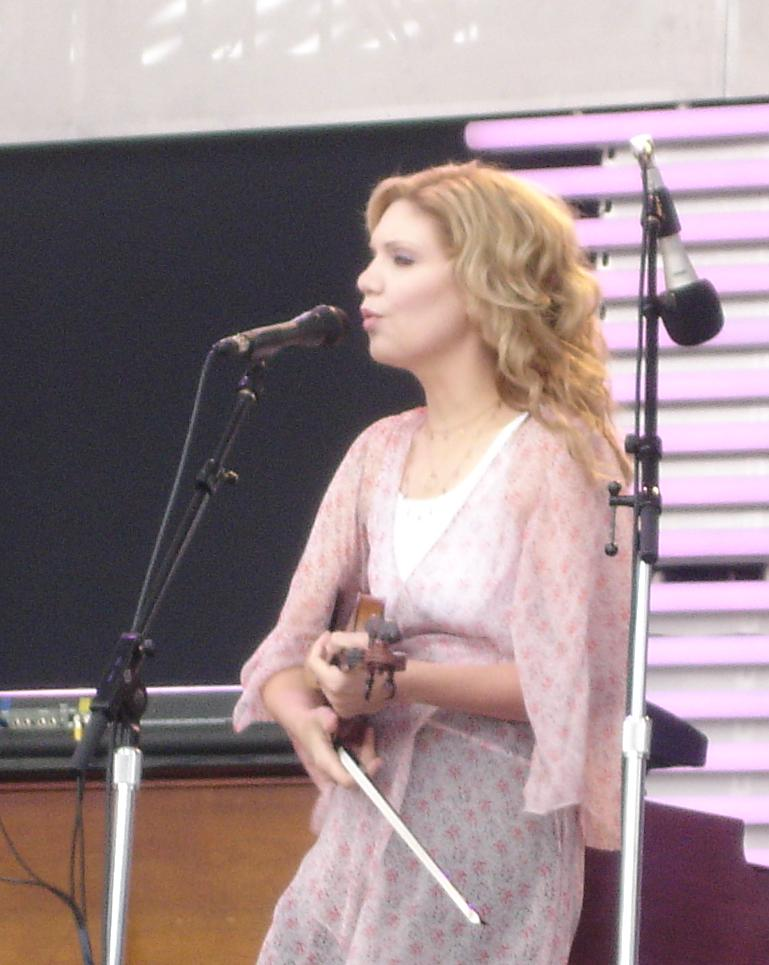
Six-time award winner Alison Krauss, performing in 2007

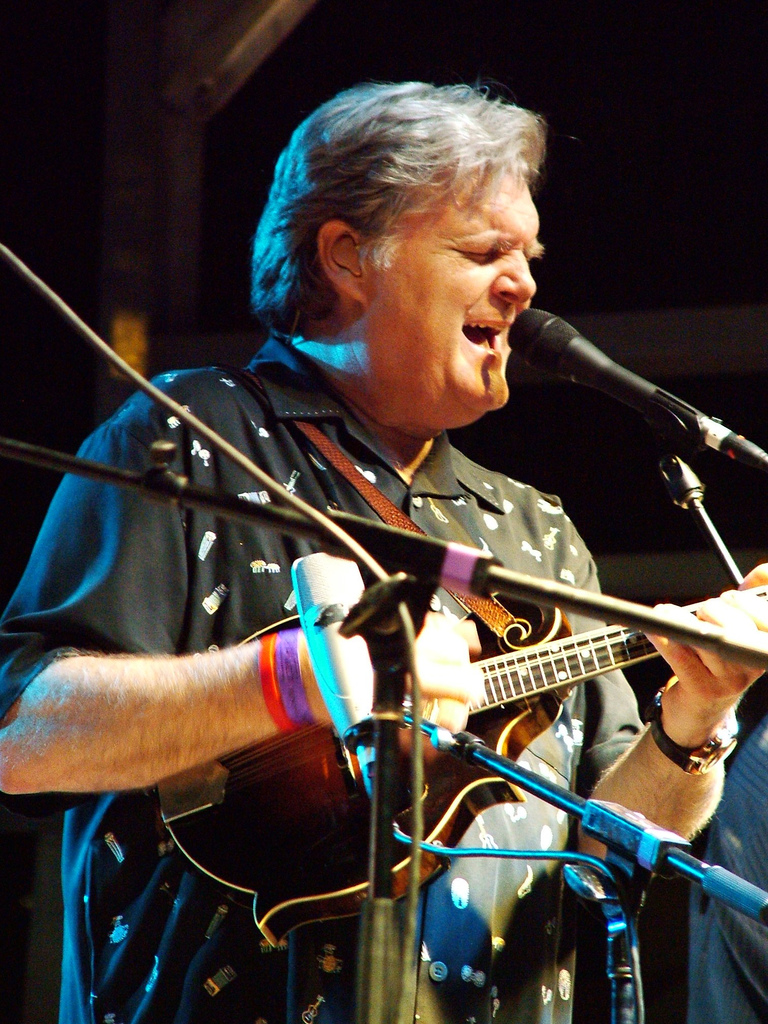
Five-time award winner Ricky Skaggs (along with Kentucky Thunder), performing in 2007

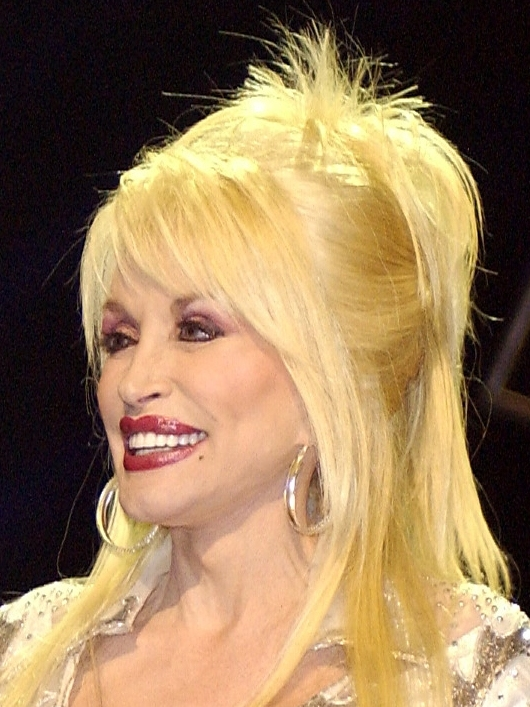
2001 award winner Dolly Parton

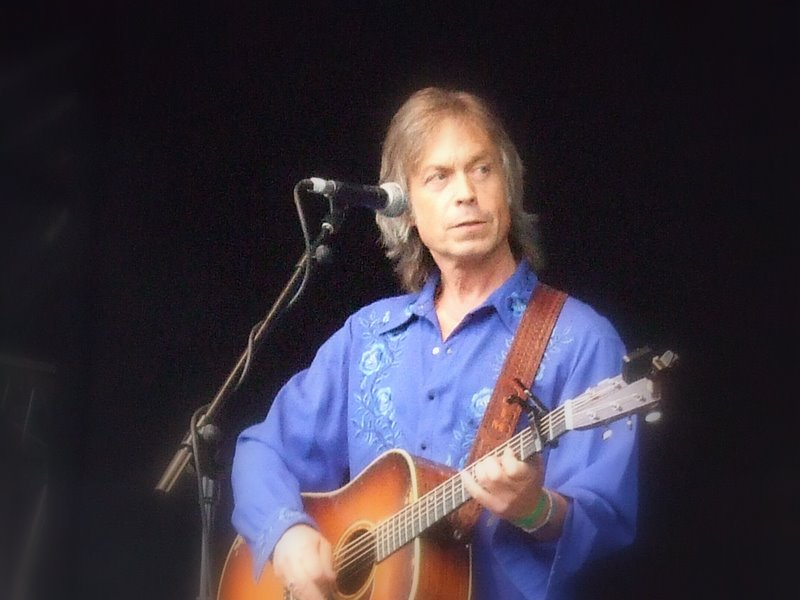
Two-time award winner Jim Lauderdale

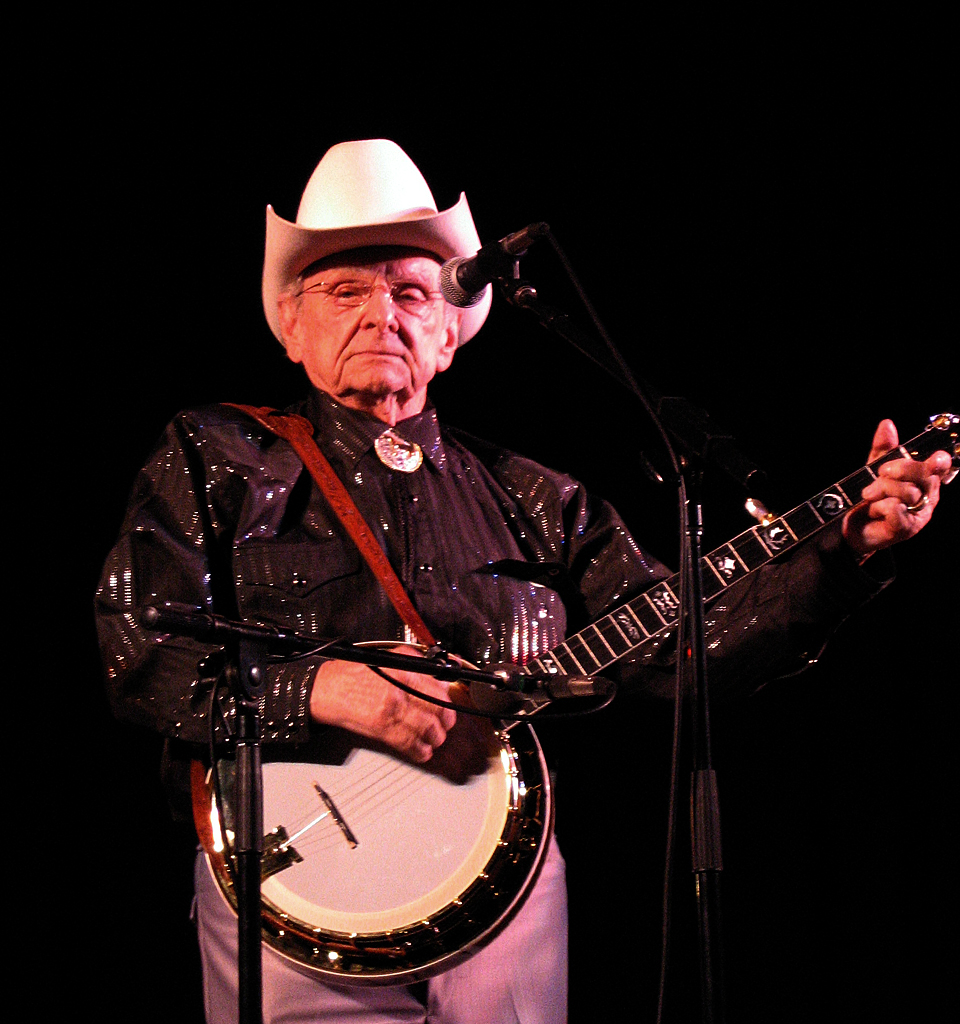
2003 award winner Ralph Stanley

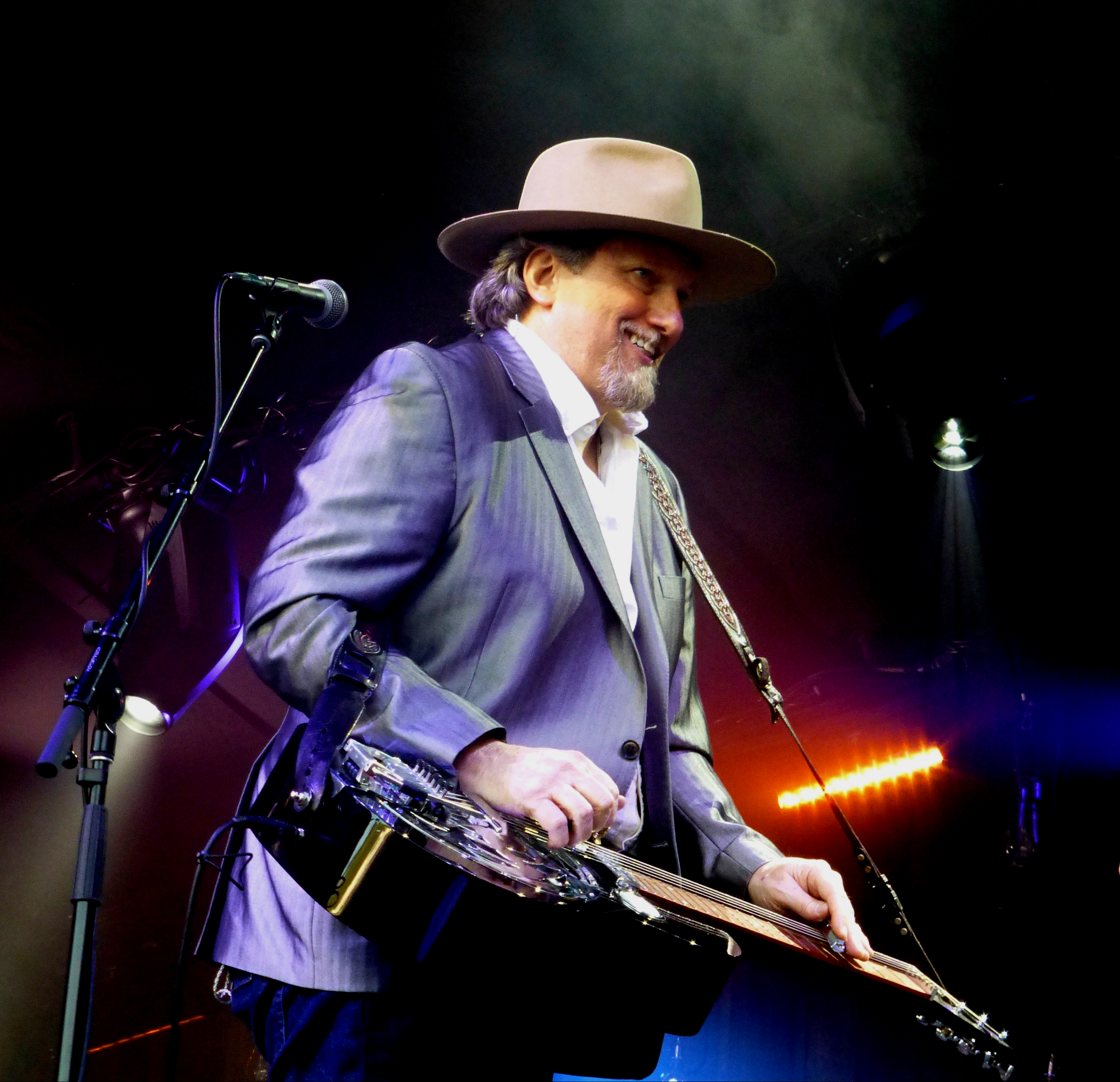
Four-time recipient Jerry Douglas has won as a member of both Union Station and The Earls of Leicester

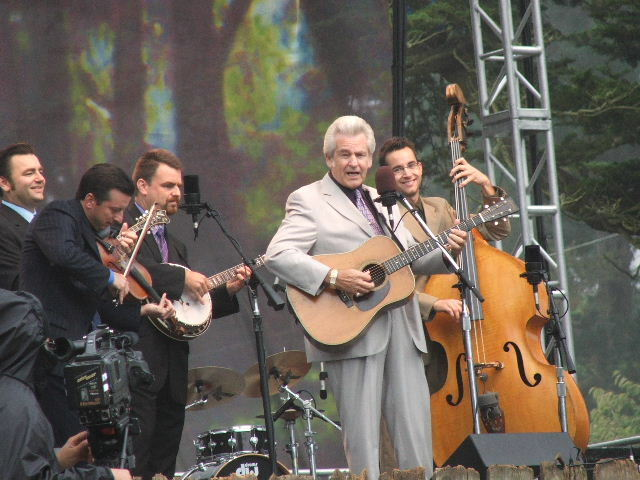
Two-time winners The Del McCoury Band

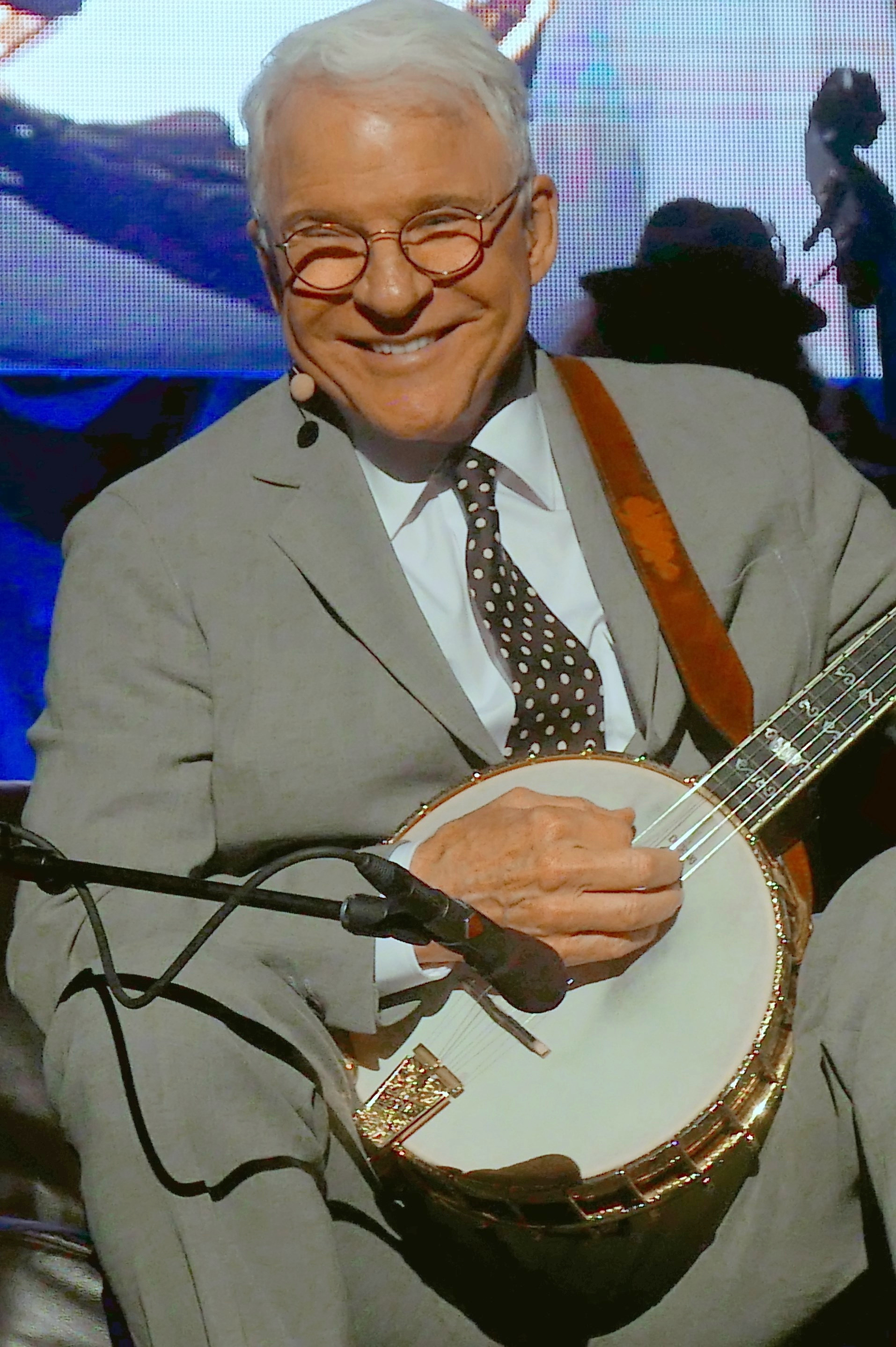
2010 award winner Steve Martin

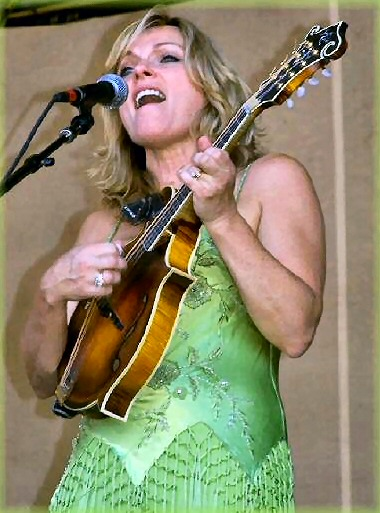
Rhonda Vincent received the award in 2018 following five previous nominations

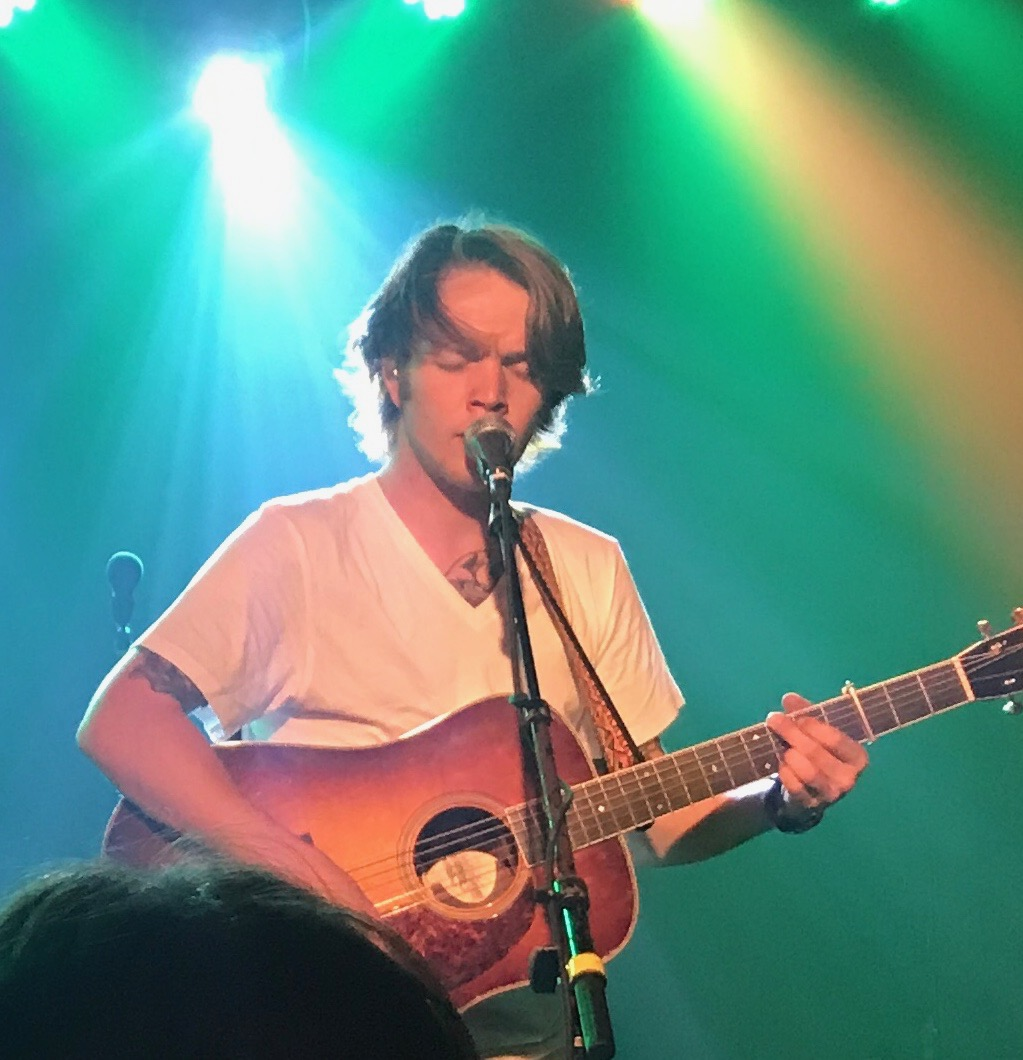
2021, 2025, and 2026 recipient Billy Strings.

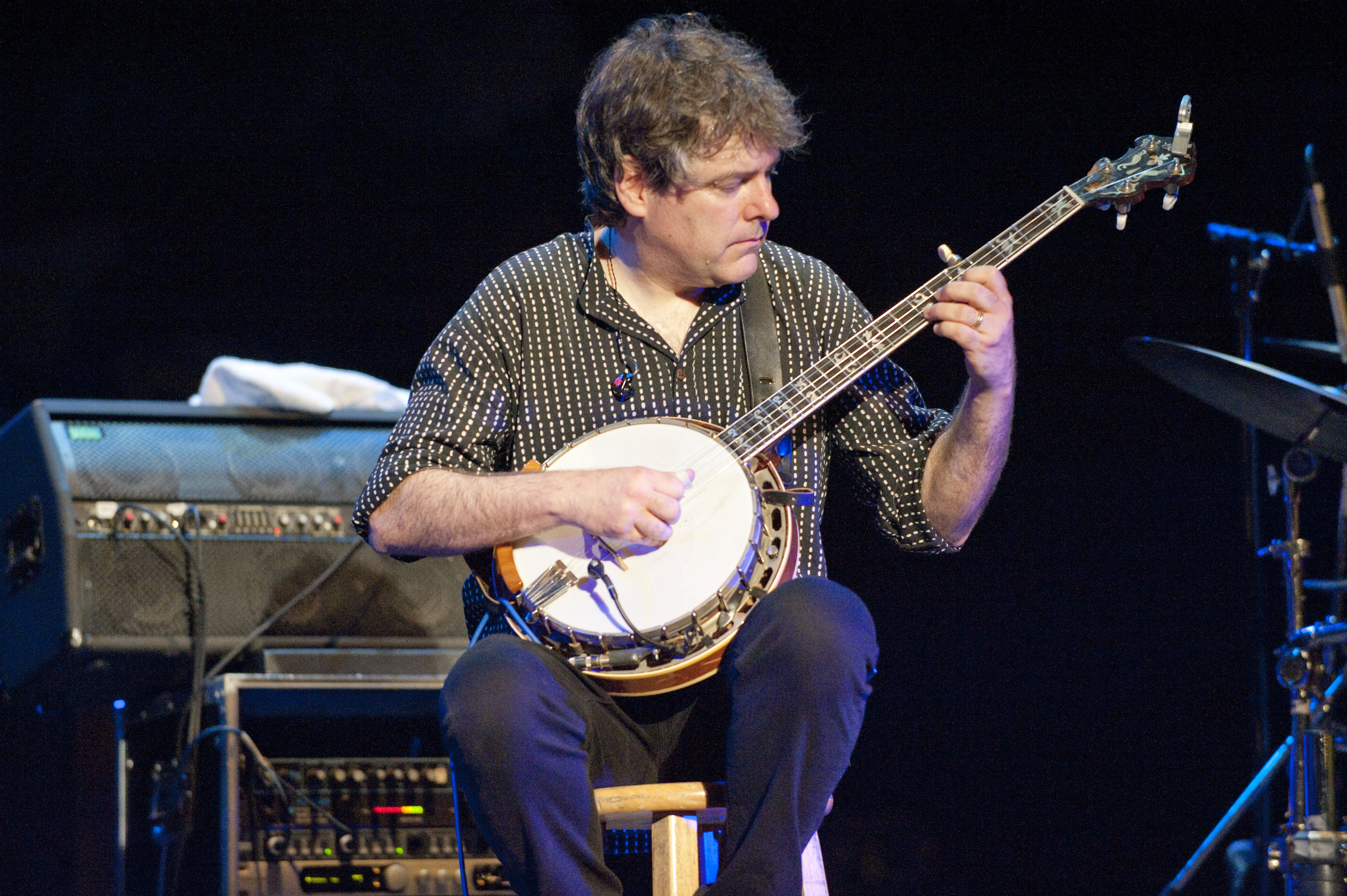
Béla Fleck won in 2022 following two prior nominations.

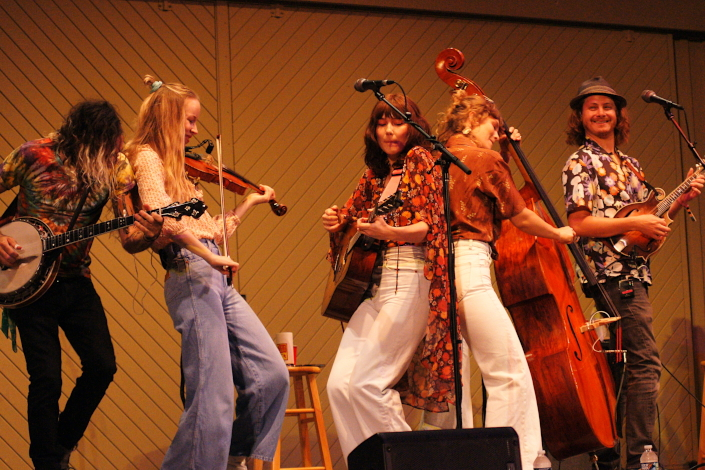
Two-time winners Molly Tuttle & Golden Highway.

=== 1980s ===
Year	Work	Artist
1989	Southern Flavor	Bill Monroe
1989	Drive	Béla Fleck
1989	15th Anniversary Celebration	The Seldom Scene
1989	Home Is Where the Heart Is	David Grisman
1989	New Moon Rising	Peter Rowan and the Nashville Bluegrass Band

=== 1990s ===
Year	Work	Artist
1990	The Valley Road	Bruce Hornsby and the Nitty Gritty Dirt Band
1990	At the Old Schoolhouse	Johnson Mountain Boys
1990	Heartbreak Hotel	Doug Dillard Band
1990	Live at the Opry	Bill Monroe and the Bluegrass Boys
1990	Two Highways	Alison Krauss & Union Station
1991	I've Got That Old Feeling	Alison Krauss
1991	The Boys Are Back in Town	Nashville Bluegrass Band
1991	Grassroots to Bluegrass	Mac Wiseman
1991	Take It Home	Hot Rize
1991	Darlin' Boys	The Dillards
1992	Spring Training	Carl Jackson and John Starling
1992	Hillbilly Fever	Osborne Brothers
1992	Home of the Blues	Nashville Bluegrass Band
1992	Music Among Friends	Jim & Jesse
1992	Simple Pleasures	Alison Brown
1993	Every Time You Say Goodbye	Alison Krauss & Union Station
1993	Bluegrass Reunion	David Grisman, Herb Pedersen, Red Allen, Jim Buchanan, James Kerwin and Jerry Garcia
1993	Larry Cordle, Glen Duncan & Lonesome Standard Time	Larry Cordle, Glen Duncan and Lonesome Standard Time
1993	Scene 20: 20th Anniversary Concert	The Seldom Scene
1993	Slide Rule	Jerry Douglas
1994	Waitin' for the Hard Times to Go	Nashville Bluegrass Band
1994	Blue Diamond	Johnson Mountain Boys
1994	Stuart Duncan	Stuart Duncan
1994	Saturday Night & Sunday Morning	Ralph Stanley
1994	Tony Rice Plays and Sings Bluegrass	Tony Rice
1995	The Great Dobro Sessions	Various Artists^{[II]}
1995	A Deeper Shade of Blue	Del McCoury
1995	Flashback	J. D. Crowe and the New South
1995	Like We Used to Be	The Seldom Scene
1995	When the Roses Bloom in Dixieland	Osborne Brothers
1996	Unleashed	Nashville Bluegrass Band
1996	Beyond the City	The Cox Family
1996	Fiddle and a Song	Byron Berline
1996	Moonlighter	Claire Lynch
1996	$35 and a Dream	Rose Maddox
1997	True Life Blues: The Songs of Bill Monroe	Various Artists^{[III]}
1997	Bluegrass Boy	Peter Rowan
1997	The Cold Hard Facts	Del McCoury Band
1997	Red on Blonde	Tim O'Brien
1997	The Stanley Tradition: Tribute to a Bluegrass Legacy	Various Artists
1998	So Long So Wrong	Alison Krauss & Union Station
1998	Age of Innocence	Kate MacKenzie
1998	Sales Tax Toddle	Richard Greene and The Grass Is Greener
1998	Short Life of Trouble	Ralph Stanley
1998	Silver and Gold	Claire Lynch
1999	Bluegrass Rules!	Ricky Skaggs and Kentucky Thunder
1999	American Beauty	Nashville Bluegrass Band
1999	Clinch Mountain Country	Ralph Stanley and Friends
1999	Home Sweet Home	Doc Watson and Merle Watson
1999	Songs from the Homeplace	Jim & Jesse

=== 2000s ===
Year	Work	Artist
2000	Ancient Tones	Ricky Skaggs
2000	Bluegrass Mandolin Extravaganza	David Grisman, Ricky Skaggs, Sam Bush, Jesse McReynolds, and Frank Wakefield
2000	The Bluegrass Sessions: Tales from the Acoustic Planet, Vol. 2	Béla Fleck
2000	I Feel Like Singing Today	Jim Lauderdale, Ralph Stanley and the Clinch Mountain Boys
2000	The Mountain	Steve Earle and the Del McCoury Band
2001	The Grass Is Blue	Dolly Parton
2001	Big Mon: The Songs of Bill Monroe	Ricky Skaggs and Friends
2001	Fair Weather	Alison Brown
2001	Murder on Music Row	Larry Cordle and Lonesome Standard Time
2001	Nickel Creek	Nickel Creek
2002	New Favorite	Alison Krauss & Union Station
2002	Clinch Mountain Sweethearts	Ralph Stanley and Friends
2002	History of the Future	Ricky Skaggs and Kentucky Thunder
2002	Little Sparrow	Dolly Parton
2002	Mountain Soul	Patty Loveless
2003	Lost in the Lonesome Pines	Clinch Mountain Boys, Jim Lauderdale, and Ralph Stanley
2003	The Hard Game of Love	Doyle Lawson and Quicksilver
2003	Jelly on My Tofu	Roland White Band
2003	Ralph Stanley	Ralph Stanley
2003	Stanley Blues	Ralph Stanley II
2004	Live	Alison Krauss & Union Station
2004	Christmas on the Mountain: A Bluegrass Christmas	Various Artists
2004	It's Just the Night	Del McCoury Band
2004	Live at the Charleston Music Hall	Ricky Skaggs and Kentucky Thunder
2004	One Step Ahead	Rhonda Vincent
2005	Brand New Strings	Ricky Skaggs and Kentucky Thunder
2005	The Bluegrass Sessions	Lynn Anderson
2005	Carrying On	Ralph Stanley II
2005	A Tribute to Jimmy Martin: "The King of Bluegrass"	Various Artists
2005	Twenty Year Blues	Nashville Bluegrass Band
2006	The Company We Keep	Del McCoury Band
2006	Cherryholmes	Cherryholmes
2006	The Grascals	The Grascals
2006	Marbletown	Blue Highway
2006	Ragin' Live	Rhonda Vincent and The Rage
2007	Instrumentals	Ricky Skaggs and Kentucky Thunder
2007	Long List of Heartaches	The Grascals
2007	Bluegrass	Jim Lauderdale
2007	Live at the Ryman	Marty Stuart
2007	All American Bluegrass Girl	Rhonda Vincent
2008	The Bluegrass Diaries	Jim Lauderdale
2008	Cherryholmes II Black and White	Cherryholmes
2008	Lefty's Old Guitar	J.D. Crowe and The New South
2008	Scenechronized	Seldom Scene
2008	Double Banjo Bluegrass Spectacular	Tony Trischka
2009	Honoring the Fathers of Bluegrass: Tribute to 1946 and 1947	Ricky Skaggs and Kentucky Thunder
2009	Cherryholmes III: Don't Believe	Cherryholmes
2009	Del McCoury Band - Live At The 2008 New Orleans Jazz & Heritage Festival	Del McCoury Band
2009	The Ultimate Collection / Live At The Ryman	Earl Scruggs
2009	Wheels	Dan Tyminski

=== 2010s ===
Year	Work	Artist
2010	The Crow: New Songs for the 5-String Banjo	Steve Martin
2010	Almost Live	Bryan Sutton and Friends
2010	Buckaroo Blue Grass	Michael Martin Murphey
2010	Could We Get Any Closer?	Jim Lauderdale
2010	Destination Life	Rhonda Vincent
2011	Mountain Soul II	Patty Loveless
2011	Circles Around Me	Sam Bush
2011	Family Circle	Del McCoury Band
2011	Legacy	Peter Rowan Bluegrass Band
2011	Reckless	The SteelDrivers
2012	Paper Airplane	Alison Krauss & Union Station
2012	A Mother's Prayer	Ralph Stanley
2012	Old Memories: The Songs of Bill Monroe	Del McCoury Band
2012	Rare Bird Alert	Steve Martin and the Steep Canyon Rangers
2012	Reason and Rhyme: Bluegrass Songs by Robert Hunter and Jim Lauderdale	Jim Lauderdale
2012	Sleep with One Eye Open	Chris Thile and Michael Daves
2013	Nobody Knows You	Steep Canyon Rangers
2013	Beat the Devil and Carry a Rail	Noam Pikelny
2013	The Gospel Side of...	Dailey & Vincent
2013	Life Finds a Way	The Grascals
2013	Scratch Gravel Road	The Special Consensus
2014	The Streets of Baltimore	Del McCoury Band
2014	Brothers of the Highway	Dailey & Vincent
2014	It's Just a Road	The Boxcars
2014	This World Oft Can Be	Della Mae
2014	Three Chords and the Truth	James King
2015	The Earls of Leicester	The Earls of Leicester
2015	Cold Spell	Frank Solivan and Dirty Kitchen
2015	Into My Own	Bryan Sutton
2015	Noam Pikelny Plays Kenny Baker Plays Bill Monroe	Noam Pikelny
2015	Only Me	Rhonda Vincent
2016	The Muscle Shoals Recordings	The SteelDrivers
2016	Before the Sun Goes Down	Rob Ickes and Trey Hensley
2016	In Session	Doyle Lawson and Quicksilver
2016	Man of Constant Sorrow	Ralph Stanley and Friends
2016	Pocket Full of Keys	Dale Ann Bradley
2017	Coming Home	O'Connor Band with Mark O'Connor
2017	Burden Bearer	Doyle Lawson & Quicksilver
2017	The Hazel and Alice Sessions	Laurie Lewis & The Right Hands
2017	North by South	Claire Lynch
2017	Original Traditional	Blue Highway
2018	All the Rage	Rhonda Vincent and the Rage
2018	Fiddler's Dream	Michael Cleveland
2018	Laws of Gravity	The Infamous Stringdusters
2018	Original	Bobby Osborne
2018	Universal Favorite	Noam Pikelny
2019	The Travelin' McCourys	The Travelin' McCourys
2019	II	Sister Sadie
2019	North of Despair	Wood & Wire
2019	Portraits in Fiddles	Mike Barnett
2019	Rivers and Roads	The Special Consensus

=== 2020s ===
Year	Work	Artist
2020	Tall Fiddler	Michael Cleveland
2020	If You Can't Stand the Heat	Frank Solivan & Dirty Kitchen
2020	Live in Prague, Czech Republic	Doyle Lawson & Quicksilver
2020	Royal Traveller	Missy Raines
2020	Toil, Tears & Trouble	The Po'Ramblin' Boys
2021	Home	Billy Strings
2021	The John Hartford Fiddle Tune Project, Vol. 1	Various Artists
2021	Man on Fire	Danny Barnes
2021	North Carolina Songbook	Steep Canyon Rangers
2021	To Live In Two Worlds, Vol. 1	Thomm Jutz
2022	My Bluegrass Heart	Béla Fleck
2022	Cuttin' Grass Vol. 1 (Butcher Shoppe Sessions)	Sturgill Simpson
2022	Music Is What I See	Rhonda Vincent
2022	Renewal	Billy Strings
2022	A Tribute To Bill Monroe	The Infamous Stringdusters
2023	Crooked Tree	Molly Tuttle & Golden Highway
2023	Almost Proud	Del McCoury Band
2023	Calling You from My Mountain	Peter Rowan
2023	Get Yourself Outside	Yonder Mountain String Band
2023	Toward the Fray	The Infamous Stringdusters
2024	City of Gold	Molly Tuttle & Golden Highway
2024	Bluegrass	Willie Nelson
2024	Lovin' of the Game	Michael Cleveland
2024	Me/And/Dad	Billy Strings
2024	Mighty Poplar	Mighty Poplar
2024	Radio John: Songs of John Hartford	Sam Bush
2025	Live Vol. 1	Billy Strings
2025	Earl Jam	Tony Trischka
2025	I Built a World	Bronwyn Keith-Hynes
2025	Live from the Ryman	Dan Tyminski
2025	No Fear	Sister Sadie
2025	Songs of Love and Life	The Del McCoury Band
2026	Highway Prayers	Billy Strings
2026	Arcadia	Alison Krauss & Union Station
2026	Carter & Cleveland	Michael Cleveland and Jason Carter
2026	Outrun	The SteelDrivers
2026	A Tip Toe High Wire	Sierra Hull
2027	Bluegrass Women	Lindsay Lou
2027	Earl Jam 2	Tony Trischka
2027	Rattlin' Bones	Bronwyn Keith-Hynes
2027	Safe, Sensible, and Sane	Alison Brown and Steve Martin
2027	So Much for Goodbyes	Billy Strings

^{^[I]} Each year is linked to the article about the Grammy Awards held that year.
^{^[II]} Awards were presented to Jerry Douglas and Tut Taylor as the producers of the album.
^{^[III]} An award was presented to Todd Phillips as the producer of the album.

== Artists with multiple wins ==
6 wins

- Alison Krauss

5 wins

- Ricky Skaggs and Kentucky Thunder
- Union Station

3 wins

- Billy Strings

2 wins

- Jim Lauderdale
- Molly Tuttle & Golden Highway
- Nashville Bluegrass Band

== Artists with multiple nominations ==
10 nominations

- Del McCoury (Note: Including nine as a member of Del McCoury Band)
- Del McCoury Band

9 nominations

- Ralph Stanley
- Ricky Skaggs

8 nominations
- Dan Tyminski (Note: Including six as a member of Union Station)
7 nominations

- Alison Krauss
- Kentucky Thunder
- Nashville Bluegrass Band
- Rhonda Vincent

6 nominations

- Jim Lauderdale
- Union Station
- Billy Strings

5 nominations

- Jerry Douglas (Note: Including three as a member of Union Station, and one as a member of Earls of Leicester)

4 nominations

- Doyle Lawson
- Noam Pikelny (Note: Including one as a member of Mighty Poplar)
- Peter Rowan
- The Seldom Scene

3 nominations

- Alison Brown
- Sam Bush
- Cherryholmes
- Michael Cleveland
- David Grisman
- Béla Fleck
- The Grascals
- The Infamous Stringdusters
- Claire Lynch
- Steve Martin
- Jesse McReynolds (Note: Including two as a member of Jim & Jesse)
- Bobby Osborne (Note: Including two as a member of Osborne Brothers)
- Steep Canyon Rangers
- Tony Trischka

2 nominations

- Blue Highway
- Clinch Mountain Boys
- Larry Cordle and Lonesome Standard Time
- J. D. Crowe and the New South
- Dailey & Vincent
- Jim & Jesse
- Johnson Mountain Boys
- Bronwyn Keith-Hynes
- Patty Loveless
- Bill Monroe
- Osborne Brothers
- Dolly Parton
- Frank Solivan and Dirty Kitchen
- The Special Consensus
- The SteelDrivers
- Bryan Sutton
- Molly Tuttle & Golden Highway

== See also ==
- International Bluegrass Music Hall of Fame
- List of Grammy Award categories
