= So Much for Goodbyes =

Studio album by Billy Strings
- Released: August 28, 2026
- Recorded: January–February 2026
- Studios: Sound Emporium (Nashville); Third Man (Nashville); Bellair (Nashville)
- Genre: Bluegrass
- Length: 75:29
- Label: Reprise
- Producers: T Bone Burnett; Billy Strings

Billy Strings chronology
Highway Prayers (2024)	So Much for Goodbyes (2026)

So Much for Goodbyes is the fifth studio album by the American bluegrass musician Billy Strings. It was released digitally, as a CD, and as a two-disc LP on August 28, 2026.

So Much for Goodbyes was nominated for a Grammy Award for Best Bluegrass Album.

== Critical reception ==
Professional ratings
Aggregate scores
Source	Rating
Any Decent Music	8.2/10
Metacritic	90/100
Review scores
Source	Rating
AllMusic	4.5/5 stars
The Guardian	5/5 stars
Beats Per Minute	76%

Any Decent Music gave the album a weighted average score of 8.2 out of 10 from seven critic scores. According to Metacritic, it received "universal acclaim" based on a weighted average score of 90 out of 100 from seven critic scores.

Alexis Petridis wrote in The Guardian, "His guitar picking is every bit as astonishingly dextrous as his tie-dyed devotees claim; his equally impressive backing quartet are particularly talented at working up a ferociously propulsive head of steam, given that their ranks don't include a drummer.... What does cut through the gloom is the lingering thought of how rich and powerful the album you've just heard is."

On AllMusic Timothy Monger said, "Over the past decade, the Michigan-born singer, songwriter, and guitarist has been a transformative force in bluegrass, gradually ascending from local phenomenon to become the genre's modern-day ambassador as well as one of its most reliable innovators... Matching the prodigious musical ability that has been apparent all along is one of his best collections of songs to date."

Writing for Beats Per Minute, John Amen observed, "While Goodbyes may capture Strings as he matures into a conventional stance, it’s still chock-full of sensual textures, moody treatments, and sophisticated thematics – not to mention virtuosic instrumentation". He concluded, "The album affirms Strings as an old-school devotee, even as it equips him to further translate bluegrass for a younger and more eclectically minded audience".

== Track listing ==
Writing credits are noted and adapted from the album's liner notes.

1. "I'm One of Those" (Billy Strings, Tim O'Brien, Jan Fabricius, Pat McLaughlin) – 4:23
2. "Burn the Other End" (Strings, Paul Hoffman) – 4:39
3. "Carry Us Home" (Strings, Joe Henry) – 4:14
4. "Lay Me Down" (Strings, Aaron Allen, Jon Weisberger, Daniel Tashian) – 4:02
5. "Lucid Daydream" (Strings) – 6:38
6. "Mill Town Flood" (Strings, Tashian, P. J. George III) – 5:06
7. "Live to Tell" (Strings) – 6:29
8. "Bluewater Breakdown" (Strings) – 3:36
9. "Light the Way" (Strings) – 2:47
10. "I Like Train Songs" (Strings, Allen, Weisberger) – 4:48
11. "10,000 Miles from a Friend" (Strings, Allen) – 5:10
12. "Still I Crash" (Strings) – 5:03
13. "I Wish I Wanted To" (Strings, Jarrod Walker, Jon Randall) – 6:45
14. "Remember to Cry" (Strings, Allen) – 3:50
15. "Wrestling an Angel" (Strings, Thomm Jutz) – 3:47
16. "Debra’s Waltz" (Strings) – 4:12

== Personnel ==
Credits are adapted from the album's liner notes.

=== Musicians ===
- Billy Strings – guitar (all tracks), vocals (tracks 1–7, 9–15), gang vocals (2), chimes (7)
- Royal Masat – bass (1, 2, 4–7, 10, 11, 13, 14, 16), gang vocals (2), backing vocals (9, 15)
- Billy Failing – banjo (1, 2, 4, 5, 7, 10, 11, 13, 14, 16), gang vocals (2), backing vocals (9)
- Jarrod Walker – mandolin (1, 2, 4, 5, 7, 8, 10, 11, 13–16), gang vocals (2), backing vocals (9)
- Alex Hargreaves – fiddle (1, 2, 4, 5, 7, 8, 10, 11, 13, 14, 16), gang vocals (2), backing vocals (9)
- Jack White III – gang vocals (2)
- T Bone Burnett – gang vocals (2)
- Bryan Sutton – guitar (3, 6)
- Del McCoury – backing vocals (4)
- Daniel Tashian – guitar, backing vocals (6)
- Lindsay Lou – backing vocals (6)
- P. J. George III – harmonium (6)
- Alwyn Robinson – drums (7, 13)
- Paul Franklin – pedal steel (7, 13)
- Alison Krauss – backing vocals (7)
- Tim O’Brien – backing vocals (10)
- Mickey Raphael – bass harmonica (11)
- Chris Henry – backing vocals (14)
- Dan Tyminski – backing vocals (15)

=== Technical and creative ===
- T Bone Burnett – production
- Billy Strings – production, art concept
- Brandon Bell – engineering, editing
- Skyler Chuckry – engineering assistance (1–11)
- Bill Skibbe – engineering assistance (12)
- Hanford Pittman – engineering assistance (12)
- Eddie Roberts – editing
- Michael Piersante – editing, mixing
- Gavin Lurssen – mastering
- Jeff Powell – vinyl mastering
- Bill Orner – executive production, design, layout
- Debra Apostol – original artwork
- Dana Trippe – photography, graphic design
- Logan Fox – design, layout

== Charts ==
Chart performance for So Much for Goodbyes
Chart (2026)	Peak position
Hungarian Physical Albums (MAHASZ)	36
Scottish Albums (Official Charts)	53
UK Albums Sales (Official Charts)	72
UK Americana Albums (Official Charts)	10
UK Country Albums (Official Charts)	6
US Billboard 200	13
US Americana/Folk Albums (Billboard)	3
US Top Bluegrass Albums (Billboard)	1
US Top Country Albums (Billboard)	4
