= Home (Billy Strings album) =

Studio album by Billy Strings
- Released: September 27, 2019
- Recorded: January 2019
- Studio: Sound Emporium (Nashville, Tennessee)
- Genre: Psychedelia, bluegrass
- Label: Rounder Records
- Producer: Glenn Brown, Billy Strings

Billy Strings chronology
| Turmoil & Tinfoil (2017) | Home (2019) | Renewal (2021) |

Home is the second solo studio album by American bluegrass musician Billy Strings, released on September 27, 2019, through Rounder Records. The album charted on the Billboard Bluegrass Albums chart for 77 weeks, peaking at number one and being the first studio album by Billy Strings to do so. The album was titled Home as Strings was starting to "feel at home" in his Nashville residence and in the music industry at the time of the album's release.

The album earned Strings his first Grammy Award for Best Bluegrass Album at the 63rd Annual Grammy Awards in March 2021. He performed "Taking Water" on Jimmy Kimmel Live!.

== Background ==
American singer-songwriter Molly Tuttle performs background vocals on "Must Be Seven". "Taking Water" focuses on groups of people being "left behind in society", while "Away from the Mire" focuses on what Strings states was "personal stuff between me and a family member".

== Reception ==
Home received positive reviews from critics. Kenny Berkowitz of Acoustic Guitar stated "...the most startling thing about the album: the way Strings can channel the Grand Ole Opry one minute, fly his freak flag the next, and be perfectly at home in both." Michael Davis of No Depression said "The songwriting [of Home] is cutting and intelligent" as well as stating that "Home demonstrates that Strings is primed to keep exploring the outer reaches of roots music." Ron Harris of ABC News stated that "Songs like 'Hollow Heart' are beautifully delivered, but traditional bluegrass in approach and structure." Carol Thompson of the Lansing State Journal states the album "exemplifies Strings' talent and frenetic, creative energy".

== Track listing ==
| No. | Title | Writer(s) | Length |
|---|---|---|---|
| 1. | "Taking Water" | William Apostol, Jon Weisberger | 4:08 |
| 2. | "Must Be Seven" | Apostol, Aaron Allen | 3:29 |
| 3. | "Running" | Apostol, Weisberger | 2:59 |
| 4. | "Away from the Mire" | Apostol, Weisberger | 7:44 |
| 5. | "Home" | Apostol | 7:36 |
| 6. | "Watch It Fall" | Apostol, Allen | 4:37 |
| 7. | "Long Forgotten Dream" | Apostol | 4:28 |
| 8. | "Highway Hypnosis" | Apostol, Ronnie McCoury, Heaven McCoury | 5:08 |
| 9. | "Enough to Leave" | Apostol | 3:44 |
| 10. | "Hollow Heart" | Apostol, Weisberger | 2:35 |
| 11. | "Love Like Me" | Apostol, Weisberger | 2:52 |
| 12. | "Everything's the Same" | Jarrod Walker, Apostol | 2:55 |
| 13. | "Guitar Peace" | Apostol | 4:06 |
| 14. | "Freedom" | Apostol, Lindsay Lou | 2:35 |
| 15. | "Untitled instrumental" (Hidden track) | | 0:29 |

== Personnel ==
The Band

- Billy Strings – guitar, vocals, banjo
- Billy Failing – banjo, vocals
- Jarrod Walker – mandolin, vocals
- Royal Masat – bass, vocals

Additional musicians

- John Mailander – violin (1, 2, 4–8)
- Glenn Brown – Buchla CM100 synthesizer (1, 8, 13); vibraphone (4); shaker, finger cymbals, string arrangement, sitar (5); Harmonium (13)
- Molly Tuttle – vocals (2)
- Christian Sedelmyer – violin and viola (5)
- Kaitlyn Raitz – cello (5)
- John Churchville – tablas (5)
- Megan Campbell – vocals (5)
- Jerry Douglas – dobro (11, 12)

Technical

- Glenn Brown – producer, engineer, mixing, mastering
- Lowell Reynolds – assistant engineer
- Dan Davis – assistant engineer
- Preston White – assistant engineer
- Evan Wilber – assistant engineer
- Sean Williams – cover art
- Bill Orner – design and layout
- Jesse Faatz – photography
