= Highway Prayers =

Studio album by Billy Strings
- Released: September 27, 2024
- Recorded: January 2021, June 2023 – June 2024
- Genre: Bluegrass
- Length: 73:55
- Label: Reprise
- Producer: Billy Strings; Jon Brion

Billy Strings chronology
Live Vol. 1 (2024)	Highway Prayers (2024)	So Much for Goodbyes (2026)

Highway Prayers is the fourth studio album by American musician Billy Strings. It was released on September 27, 2024 via Reprise Records. Produced by Strings himself together with Jon Brion, the album peaked at number 22 on the Billboard 200, and at number 1 on the Top Album Sales chart, as well as number 1 on the Bluegrass Albums chart. The album won a Grammy Award for Best Bluegrass Album at the 68th Annual Grammy Awards held on February 1, 2026.

== Critical reception ==
Professional ratings
Aggregate scores
Source	Rating
Metacritic	83/100
Review scores
Source	Rating
AllMusic	4/5 stars
Pitchfork	7.8/10
Rolling Stone	4/5 stars
Spectrum Culture	83/100%

Highway Prayers was met with universal acclaim from music critics. At Metacritic, which assigns a normalized rating out of 100 to reviews from mainstream publications, the album received an average score of 83, based on six reviews.

AllMusic's Timothy Monger praised the album, resuming: "Highway Prayers is too long -- there is a fantastic 40-minute album in there -- but it's also a lot of fun, and it may take a young superstar like Strings to bend and stretch bluegrass enough to deliver it to the masses". Will Hermes of Rolling Stone wrote: "an impressive 20-track album that recalls the days when old-timey hybrids like Old and In the Way and Will the Circle Be Unbroken sat proudly alongside country-rock classics like Workingman's Dead, Desperado, and Eat a Peach on American record shelves". Stephen Thomas Erlewine of Pitchfork stated: "he's finding new aural and emotional textures within a familiar genre. Those fresh sounds are married to the sturdiest set of songs Strings has written, with defined melodies distinguished by flashes of empathy and wit".

== Track listing ==
No.	Title	Writer(s)	Length
1.	"Leaning on a Travelin' Song"	Billy Strings, Thomm Jutz	3:57
2.	"In the Clear"	Billy Strings, Aaron Allen, Jon Weisberger	2:56
3.	"Escanaba"	Billy Strings	4:33
4.	"Gild the Lily"	Billy Strings, Jarrod Walker	5:05
5.	"Seven Weeks in County"	Billy Strings, Aaron Allen	4:16
6.	"Stratosphere Blues" / "I Believe in You"	Billy Strings	5:50
7.	"Cabin Song"	Billy Strings	3:15
8.	"Don't Be Calling Me (At 4AM)"	Billy Strings, Shawn Camp	3:14
9.	"Malfunction Junction"	Billy Strings	4:51
10.	"Catch and Release"	Billy Strings, Aaron Allen, Jon Weisberger	2:14
11.	"Be Your Man"	Billy Strings	4:00
12.	"Gone a Long Time"	Billy Strings, Jarrod Walker	3:01
13.	"It Ain't Before"	Billy Strings, Thomm Jutz	3:46
14.	"My Alice"	Billy Strings, Aaron Allen, Jon Weisberger	4:05
15.	"Seney Stretch"	Billy Strings	4:34
16.	"MORBUD4ME"	Billy Strings	2:54
17.	"Leadfoot"	Billy Strings	2:45
18.	"Happy Hollow"	Billy Strings, Thomm Jutz	2:45
19.	"The Beginning of the End"	Billy Strings	3:57
20.	"Richard Petty"	Billy Strings	1:57
Total length:			73:55

== Personnel ==
Musicians

- Billy Strings – vocals, guitar, 12-string acoustic guitar, resonator guitar, EBow electric guitar, steel guitar, mandolin, banjo, bass, keyboard, percussion, shaker, whistle
- Billy Failing – banjo, backing vocals
- Royal Masat – bass, backing vocals
- Jarrod Walker – mandolin, mandocello, tenor guitar, backing vocals
- Alex Hargreaves – fiddle, mandolin

Additional musicians

- Jon Brion – bass, drums, percussion
- Jason Carter – fiddle
- Matt Chamberlain – drums
- Jerry Douglas – dobro
- Victor Furtado – banjo
- Cory Henry – piano
- Lindsay Lou – backing vocals
- Peter "Madcat" Ruth – harmonica, jaw harp
- Taneka Samone – backing vocals
- Nathaniel Smith – cello

Production

- Produced by Billy Strings and Jon Brion
- Additional production: Brandon Bell
- Engineering: Greg Koller, Brandon Bell, Gary Paczosa
- Engineering assistance: Chaz Saxon, Joe Caldwell, Jason Tobias, Skylar Chuckry
- Editing: Eric Caudieux
- Mixing: Greg Koller
- Mastering: Patricia Sullivan
- Photography: Dana Trippe
- Design, layout, concept: Billy Strings, Bill Orner

== Charts ==
Chart (2024)	Peak position
UK Americana Albums (Official Charts)	34
US Billboard 200	22
US Americana/Folk Albums (Billboard)	6
US Top Bluegrass Albums (Billboard)	1
US Top Country Albums (Billboard)	8
