= Queen of Time (Lindsay Lou album) =

Studio album by Lindsay Lou
- Released: September 29, 2023
- Studio: Sound Emporium Studio B (Nashville)
- Genre: Folk rock
- Length: 37:36
- Label: Kill Rock Stars Nashville
- Producer: Dave O'Donnell

Lindsay Lou chronology
Southland (2018)	Queen of Time (2023)	Bluegrass Women (2026)

Queen of Time is the second solo studio album by American singer-songwriter Lindsay Lou. The album was produced by Dave O'Donnell, and released on September 29, 2023 on the Kill Rock Stars label in Nashville. The eleven track record received strong reviews highlighting Lou's theme of the "divine feminine" and memories of her recently deceased grandmother.

== Track listing ==
As listed on the CD digisleve:

1. "Nothing Else Matters" (featuring Jerry Douglas) (Maya de Vitry, Phoebe Hunt) - 3:20
2. "Nothing’s Working" (featuring Billy Strings) (Lindsay Lou, William Apostol) - 3:32
3. "I Can Help" (Billy Swan) - 3:55
4. "On Your Side (Starman)" (Lindsay Lou, Jon Weisberger) - 3:01
5. "Love Calls" (Lindsay Lou, PJ George III) - 5:32
6. "Queen Of Time" (Lindsay Lou) - 3:53
7. "Rules" (Lindsay Lou) - 2:37
8. "Needed" (Lindsay Lou) - 2:46
9. "Shame" (Lindsay Lou) - 4:31
10. "This Too Shall Pass" (Grandma Nancy Anne Timbrook) - 0:44
11. "Silent" (Lindsay Lou, Phoebe Hunt) - 3:45

== Personnel ==
Credits adapted from the album's liner notes.

=== Musicians ===
- Lindsay Lou – acoustic guitar, vocals
- Anthony da Costa – electric guitar, acoustic guitar, slide guitar, Juno synths, background vocals
- PJ George III – upright bass, electric bass, piano, organ, djembe, background vocals
- Alex Bice – drums, bongos, triangle, background vocals
- Jerry Douglas – dobro (1)
- Billy Strings – electric guitar (2, 9), acoustic guitar (2), vocals(2)
- Anders Beck – dobro (2)
- Eddy Dunlap – pedal steel guitar (4)
- Phoebe Hunt – violin (11), background vocals (11)
- Dominick Leslie – mandolin (1, 8)
- Royal Massat – upright bass (7)
- Mimi Naja – mandolin (7), background vocals (7)
- Joshua Rilko – mandolin (4, 5, 11)
- Matt Rowland – Rhodes piano – (11)
- Kyle Tuttle – banjo (7), background vocals (7)
- Melody Walker – background vocals (5), pandeiro (5), caxixi (5)

=== Production ===
- Dave O'Donnell – producer, recording (1, 2, 7, 11), engineering, mixing
- Anthony da Costa – recording
- Dewey Boyd – recording (2, 7)
- Jaedon Bonifield – recording assistant (2, 7)
- Caison Rogers – recording assistant (2, 7)
- Nate Anderson – recording assistant (2, 7)
- Skylar Chuckry – assistant engineer
- Greg Calbri – mastering
- Steve Fallone – mastering
- Dana Kalachnick – photography
- Sierra Kusterbeck – styling
- Rob Jones – layout
