= Renewal (Billy Strings album) =

Studio album by Billy Strings
- Released: September 24, 2021
- Studio: Sound Emporium (Nashville, Tennessee); FiveStarStudios (Los Angeles, California); Minutia (Nashville, Tennessee); Concord Mastering (Nashville, Tennessee)
- Genre: Bluegrass
- Label: Rounder Records
- Producer: Jonathan Wilson & Billy Strings

Billy Strings chronology
Home (2019)	Renewal (2021)	Live Vol. 1 (2024)

Renewal is the third solo studio album by American bluegrass musician Billy Strings, following Home. Released on September 24, 2021, the album peaked at number one on the Billboard Bluegrass Albums chart, making Renewal the second consecutive studio album by Billy Strings to do so.

The song "Red Daisy", one of the tracks on the album, was performed on Jimmy Kimmel Live! on October 25, 2021.

== Overview and meaning ==
The last track on the album, "Leaders", tackles the subject of human rights. Other tracks on the album, such as "In the Morning Light" and "Love and Regret", focus on the subject of love and relationships.

The lengthiest track on the album, "Hide and Seek", features a chorus with the last text messages one of Billy Strings’ friends sent to him before committing suicide.

== Reception ==
Matt Ruppert of No Depression stated "Though the musicality is the most automatically familiar part of Renewal, the songs themselves, built around Strings’ yearning vocals, stand up to and even match the exploratory music."

It was nominated for the Grammy Award for Best Bluegrass Album.

== Track listing ==
No.	Title	Writer(s)	Length
1.	"Know It All"	William Apostol, Jon Weisberger, Aaron Allen	3:26
2.	"Secrets"	Apostol, Weisberger, Allen	4:44
3.	"Love and Regret"	Apostol, Allen	4:16
4.	"Heartbeat of America"	Apostol, Allen	6:22
5.	"In the Morning Light"	Apostol, Paul Hoffman	4:43
6.	"This Old World"	Apostol, Weisberger, Allen, Jarrod Walker, John Mailander	3:55
7.	"Show Me the Door"	Walker, Christian Ward	5:00
8.	"Hellbender"	Apostol, Weisberger, Allen	3:25
9.	"Red Daisy"	Walker, Ward	2:41
10.	"The Fire on My Tongue"	Apostol, Weisberger, Allen	2:45
11.	"Nothing’s Working"	Apostol, Lindsay Lou	3:16
12.	"Hide and Seek"	Apostol, Billy Failing, Royal Masat, Walker	9:26
13.	"Ice Bridges"	Apostol	4:01
14.	"Fire Line"	Apostol, Failing, Masat, Walker	4:35
15.	"Running the Route"	Walker, Ward	3:35
16.	"Leaders"	Apostol, Steve Poltz	4:18

== Personnel ==
The Band

- Billy Strings – guitar, vocals, mandolin, piano, synth, guitjo (guitar banjo), bass drum, bells, chimes
- Billy Failing – banjo, vocals, piano
- Jarrod Walker – mandolin, vocals, guitar
- Royal Masat – bass, vocals

Additional musicians

- John Mailander – violin
- Spencer Cullum Jr. – pedal steel
- Grant Milliken – synth
- Jonathan Wilson – celesta, percussion, harpsichord, group vocals
- Ally Dale, Nate Flores, Steve York, Bill Orner – group vocals

Technical

- Jonathan Wilson – producer
- Gary Paczosa – engineer (Sound Emporium), mixing
- Skyler Chuckry – assistant engineer (Sound Emporium)
- Grant Milliken – engineer (FiveStarStudios)
- Paul Blakemore – mastering
- Tyler Franz – cover photo
- Bill Orner – design concept and layout
- Jesse Faatz – photography
