= Scythian (band) =

American rock band

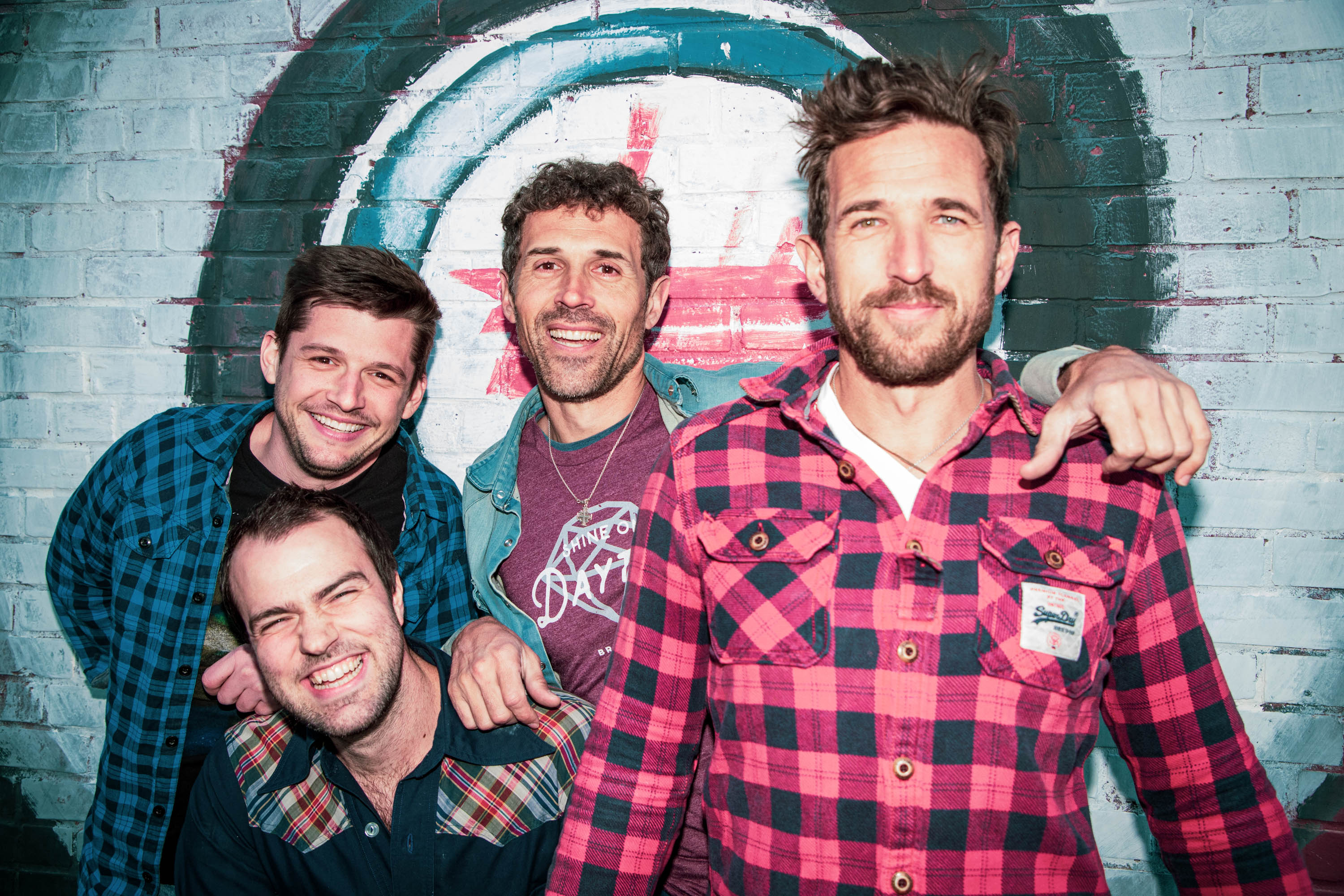
- Scythian before a show in Raleigh, North Carolina

Background information
- Origin: Washington, D.C., United States
- Genres: Celtic music, celtic rock, americana, folk rock, gypsy rock
- Years active: 2002–present
- Members: Alexander Fedoryka; Danylo Fedoryka; Ethan Dean; Alex (Animal) Kuldell
- Past members: Fritz McGirr; Nolan Ladewski; Larissa Fedoryka; Josef Crosby; Tim Hepburn; Alexander Kuldell; Michael Ounallah; Andrew Toy; Ben-David Warner; Johnny Rees
- Website: www.scythianmusic.com

Scythian is a Celtic rock/Americana band based in the DC Metro Area that formed in 2002. The band's name, according to the members of Scythian, means "[a] bunch of pre-Mesopotamian barbarians who did not use forks or phonics," which they chose to describe a varying sound that encompasses everything from traditional jigs and reels to contemporary covers. The band was named after Ukrainian nomads, Scythians, due to the Ukrainian ancestry of Alexander and Danylo Fedoryka.

Since its inception, Scythian developed from a group of street performers in Alexandria, Virginia, to the 2009 winner of Washington City Paper's Best of DC 'Best Local Band' competition. In 2004 the band scored a brief appearance in the M. Night Shyamalan film The Village. The band has toured extensively on the East Coast. The UB Post describes their sound as a mix of Celtic, Klezmer, Gaelic, Gypsy and Rock.

The band currently comprises brothers Alexander Fedoryka (Violin/Mandolin/Electric Tenor Guitar/Harmonica/Bass/Vocals) and Danylo Fedoryka (Rhythm Guitar/Accordion/Vocals), as well as band members Ethan Dean (Bass/Upright Bass/Guitar/Mandolin/Sub Synth/Percussion/Vocals) and Alex (Animal) Kuldell (Percussion/Drums/Vocals).

== Band members ==
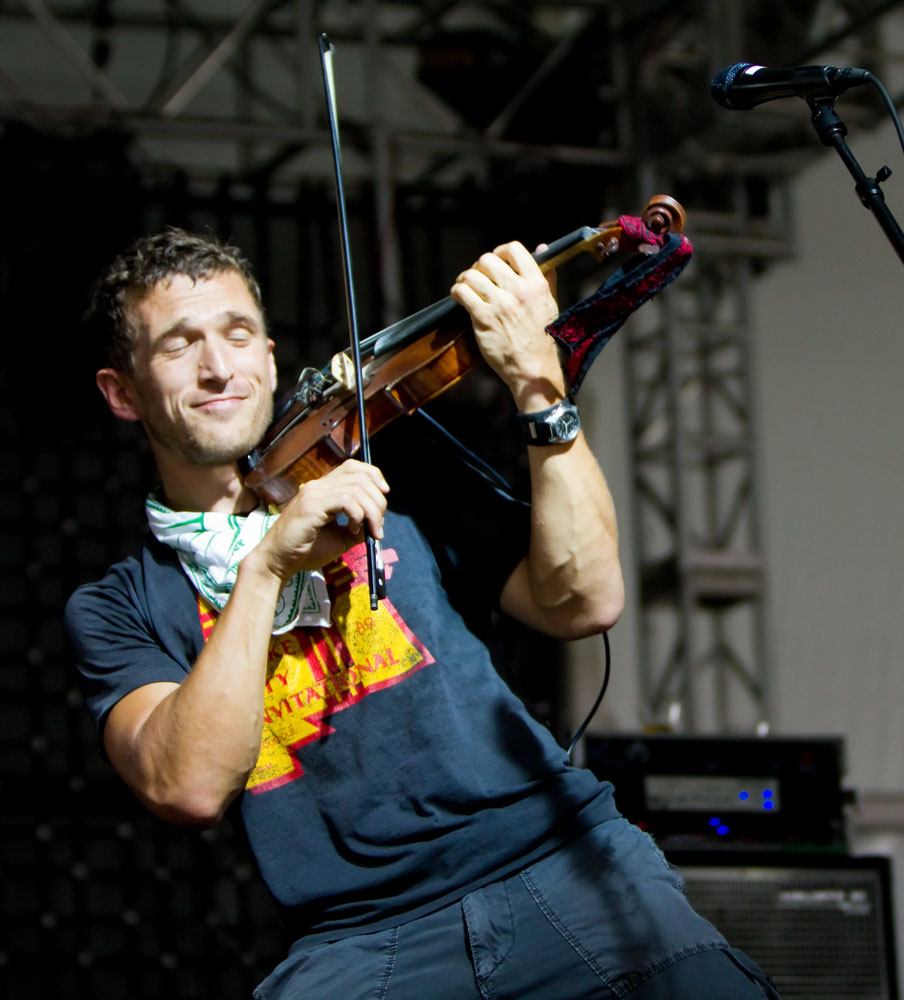
Alex Fedoryka of Scythian at the 2010 Dublin (Ohio) Irish Festival

=== Current ===
- Alexander Fedoryka: Vocals, Violin, Mandolin, Electric Tenor Guitar, Harmonica, Bass
- Danylo Fedoryka: Vocals, Rhythm Guitar, Accordion
- Ethan Dean: Vocals, Percussion, Bass, Upright Bass, Mandolin, Guitar, Sub Synth
- Alex (Animal) Kuldell: Vocals, Drums, Percussion

=== Past band members ===
- Fritz McGirr: Drums, Percussion, Vocals
- Nolan Ladewski: Whistles, Flute, Vocals, Guitar, Banjo, Mandolin, Tenor Banjo
- Larissa Fedoryka: Vocals, Cello, Bass
- Josef Crosby: Vocals, Violin, Bass
- Tim Hepburn: Drums, Percussion, Vocals
- Alexander Kuldell: Drums, Percussion
- Michael Ounallah: Vocals, Percussion, Drums, Banjo
- Danny Schneible: Drums, Percussion, Guitar, Lead Vocals
- Andrew Toy: Drums, Percussion, Vocals
- Ben-David Warner: Banjo, Violin, Viola, Mandolin, Vocals, Guitar
- Johnny Rees: Drums, Percussion, Vocals

=== Josef Crosby's departure ===
Josef Crosby stopped appearing with the band in May 2016, and Larissa Fedoryka took over on bass. On December 13, 2016, Josef Crosby posted an explanation of his departure on his own Facebook band page. He stated that he had taken some time away to address his substance abuse issues, and moving forward he would be continuing his musical career separate from Scythian.

Josef Crosby joined forces with Victor Gagnon, formerly of Seven Nations, to create Pigeon Kings in 2017. Their first show was at Celtic Fling in PA June 2017. Former Scythian drummer Andrew Toy later joined Pigeon Kings.

== Discography ==
- Dance at the Crossroads, 2002
- Aidan's Orbit, 2004
- Immigrant Road Show, 2007
- Scythian Live Vol. 1, 2009
- Scythian Live Vol. 2, 2010
- American Shanty, 2011
- It's Not Too Late, 2012
- Jump At The Sun, 2014
- Old Tin Can, 2015
- Roots and Stones, 2020
- Quaranstream: The Album, 2021
- Christmas Out At Sea, 2023

== Appaloosa Music Festival ==
Appaloosa Music Festival is an annual music festival created by Scythian. The Festival is based at the Skyline Ranch Resort, just a few miles from Front Royal, Virginia. Every year on Labor Day weekend, Appaloosa celebrates the music of the Shenandoah Valley and related genres.

== Ultramontane ==
In 2013, a few members of Scythian formed a new group named 'Ultramontane' in order to perform at the "March for Marriage" The concert component of the March was ultimately cancelled.
