= Bluegrass Women =

Studio album by Lindsay Lou
- Released: August 14, 2026
- Studios: Sound Emporium Studio B (Nashville); Parlor Productions (Nashville)
- Genre: Bluegrass music
- Length: 39:54
- Label: Self-released
- Producers: Lindsay Lou, Shani Gandhi

Lindsay Lou chronology
Queen of Time (2023)	Bluegrass Women (2026)

Bluegrass Women is the third solo studio album by American singer-songwriter Lindsay Lou. Produced by Lou and Shani Gandhi, and recorded at Sound Emporium Studio B and Parlor Productions in Nashville, it was self-released on August 14, 2026. Lou presented the album as part of a project she initiated to honor the less well-known but important contributions of women to the bluegrass music genre.

All of the songs on the album were written by women. Nearly two dozen contemporary female bluegrass musicians contributed to the album, which was accompanied by a four-part documentary about the history and influence of women in bluegrass.

== Track listing ==
Songs written as indicated:

1. "All I Ever Loved Was You" (Dorothy Skaggs) - 3:24
2. "Like A River" (Kate Wolf) - 3:57
3. "High On A Mountain" (Ola Belle Reed) - 4:31
4. "I Only Exist" (Joyce Morris & Jimmie Stanley) - 4:31
5. "I've Endured" (Ola Belle Reed) - 3:47
6. "Jubilee" (collected by Jean Ritchie) - 4:02
7. "Won't You Come And Sing For Me" (Hazel Dickens) - 3:44
8. "CC Rider" (Traditional, first verse Lena Arant) - 4:06
9. "Freight Train" (Elizabeth Cotten) - 3:54
10. "Your Lone Journey" (Rosa Lee Watson & Doc Watson) - 3:58

== Personnel ==
=== Musicians ===
Song credits as listed on CD digisleeve:

on (1), "All I Ever Loved Was You"

- Lindsay Lou – guitar, vocal
- Tatiana Hargreaves – fiddle, harmony vocals
- Laurie Lewis – fiddle, harmony vocals
- Maddie Witler – mandolin
- Alison Brown – banjo
- Hasee Ciaccio – bass

on (2), "Like A River"

- Lindsay Lou – vocal
- Courtney Hartman – guitar
- Bronwyn Keith-Hines – fiddle
- AJ Lee – mandolin, harmony vocal
- Gena Britt – banjo
- Hasee Ciaccio – bass
- Wila Frank – harmony vocal

on (3), "High On A Mountain"

- Lindsay Lou – guitar, vocal
- Brittany Haas – fiddle
- Sierra Hull – mandolin
- Gena Britt – banjo
- Allison de Groot – banjo
- Emma Rose – bass, harmony vocal
- Wila Frank – harmony vocal

on (4), "I Only Exist"

- Lindsay Lou – guitar, vocal
- Courtney Hartman – guitar
- Bronwyn Keith-Hines – fiddle
- Wila Frank – fiddle, harmony vocal
- AJ Lee – mandolin
- Gena Britt – banjo
- Hasee Ciaccio – bass
- Emma Rose – harmony vocal

on (5), "I've Endured"

- Lindsay Lou – guitar, vocal
- Sarah Jarosz – octave mandolin, vocal
- Brittany Haas – fiddle
- Sierra Hull – mandolin
- Allison de Groot – banjo
- Emma Rose – bass, vocal

on (6), "Jubilee"

- Lindsay Lou – guitar, vocal
- Tatiana Hargreaves – fiddle, vocal
- Maddie Witler – mandolin
- Alison Brown – banjo
- Hasee Ciaccio – bass, vocal

on (7), "Won't You Come And Sing For Me"

- Lindsay Lou – guitar, vocal
- Tatiana Hargreaves – fiddle, harmony vocals
- Phoebe Hunt – fiddle, harmony vocals
- Maddie Witler – mandolin
- Alison Brown – banjo
- Hasee Ciaccio – bass

on (8), "CC Rider"

- Lindsay Lou – guitar, vocal
- Wila Frank – fiddle
- Jenni Lyn Gardner – mandolin
- Gena Britt – banjo
- Hasee Ciaccio – bass
- Sally Van Meter – dobro

on (9), "Freight Train"

- Lindsay Lou – vocal
- Courtney Hartman – guitar
- Molly Tuttle – guitar, harmony vocal
- Bronwyn Keith-Hines – fiddle
- AJ Lee – mandolin, harmony vocal
- Gena Britt – banjo
- Hasee Ciaccio – bass

on (10), "Your Lone Journey"

- Lindsay Lou – guitar, vocal
- Wila Frank – fiddle, harmony vocal
- Jenni Lyn Gardner – mandolin
- Gena Britt – banjo
- Hasee Ciaccio – bass
- Aoife O'Donovan – harmony vocal

=== Production ===
- Lindsay Lou – producer
- Shani Gandhi – producer, engineering, mixing
- Daniel Bacigalupi – mastering
- Sawyer Gieseke – photography
- Joanna Finley – assistant engineer (1, 6, 7)
- Ethan Greek – assistant engineer (2–5, 9–10)
- David O'Dell – recording (8)
- Darren Schneider – recording (10)
