= Live Vol. 1 (Billy Strings album) =

Live album by Billy Strings
- Released: June 12, 2024
- Recorded: April 22, 2023 – March 1, 2024
- Genre: Bluegrass
- Label: Reprise
- Producer: Billy Strings

Billy Strings chronology
Renewal (2021)	Live Vol. 1 (2024)	Highway Prayers (2024)

Live Vol. 1 is an album of bluegrass music by Billy Strings. It was recorded in concert at various venues from April 2023 to March 2024. It was released on CD, LP, and in digital formats on July 12, 2024.

Live Vol. 1 won a Grammy Award for Best Bluegrass Album.

== Critical reception ==
In Glide Magazine Dave Goodwich wrote, "Billy Strings Live Vol. 1, the first official live release recorded by Strings and his uber-talented ensemble, is everything a music fan could hope for.... Strings manages to catch bluegrass lightning in a bottle thanks to the album's cohesive tracklist, pristine audio engineering and sheer strength of the material."

In No Depression, Grant Britt said, "Strings has surrounded himself with a cadre of touring musicians... who not only supply the framework for his solos but add their own musical thoughts to the conversation as well. Nobody is shouting for attention; it all blends into a seamless flow.... Strings' solos go anywhere he feels in the moment, but always seem to land in the right place."

In Local Spins, John Sinkevics said, "So it goes without saying that a Billy Strings live album is a must, reflecting the core spirit of his music and the charismatic on-stage aura that inspires devotees to gleefully follow him from concert to concert.... Not surprisingly, the album soared straight to No. 1 on Billboard's Bluegrass Chart."

== Track listing ==
No.	Title	Writer(s)	Recorded	Length
1.	"Dust in a Baggie"	Billy Strings	December 15, 2023; Mohegan Sun Arena at Casey Plaza	3:41
2.	"Away from the Mire"	Billy Strings, Jon Weisberger	June 2, 2023; Moody Center	13:08
3.	"Long Forgotten Dream"	Billy Strings	September 22, 2023; Renewal Festival	4:36
4.	"Heartbeat of America"	Billy Strings, Aaron Allen	February 25, 2024; Ryman Auditorium	10:17
5.	"Dos Banjos"	Billy Strings	November 14, 2023; La Cigale	3:24
6.	"Fire Line" / "Reuben's Train"	Billy Strings, Royal Masat, Billy Failing, Jarrod Walker / traditional	February 25, 2024; Ryman Auditorium	19:03
7.	"Turmoil & Tinfoil"	Billy Strings	December 31, 2023; UNO Lakefront Arena	21:13
8.	"Richard Petty"	Billy Strings	March 1, 2024; State Farm Arena	2:12
9.	"Hellbender" (digital-only bonus track)	Billy Strings, Jon Weisberger, Aaron Allen	April 22, 2023; St. Augustine Amphitheatre	3:28
10.	"Highway Hypnosis" (digital-only bonus track)	Billy Strings	June 16, 2023; Pine Knob Music Theatre	15:36

== Personnel ==
Musicians

- Billy Strings – vocals, guitar, banjo
- Billy Failing – banjo, vocals
- Alex Hargreaves – fiddle
- Royal Masat – bass, vocals
- Jarrod Walker – mandolin, vocals

Production

- Produced by Billy Strings
- Executive producer: Bill Orner
- Recording: Andy Lytle
- Mixing: Brandon Bell, Annie Petrik
- Mastering: Gavin Lurssen
- Artwork: Alex Tenta
- Photography: Jesse Faatz, Andy Tennille
