= Appaloosa Music Festival =

Annual music festival in Front Royal, Virginia, United States

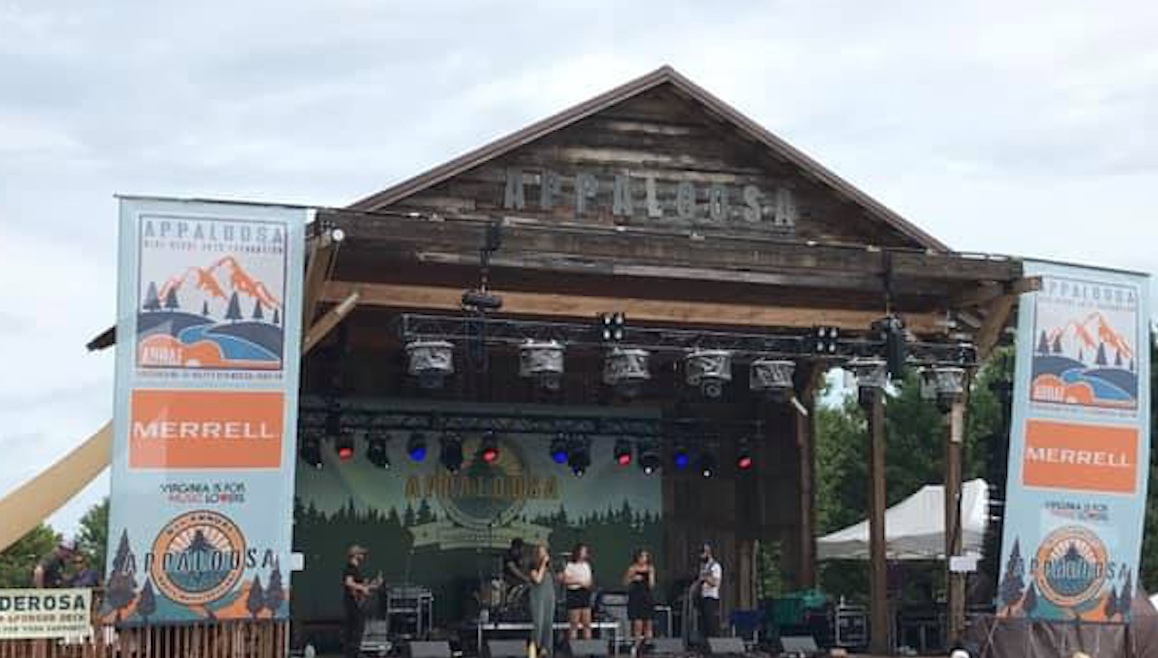
- Appaloosa Main Stage
- Dates: Labor Day Weekend
- Location(s): Front Royal, VA, United States
- Years active: 2015–2019, 2021–
- Website: appaloosafestival.com

Appaloosa Music Festival is an annual music festival based at the Skyline Ranch Resort, just a few miles from Front Royal, Virginia. Every year on Labor Day weekend, the festival celebrates the music of the Shenandoah Valley and related genres.

== History ==
The Festival was created in 2015 by the band Scythian, a group formed by brothers Alexander and Danylo Fedoryka. The festival creators designed Appaloosa as a celebration of roots music in the DC area, featuring local DC artists as well as musicians from genres ranging from Irish folk music to Bluegrass.

The family-friendly event has some ties to the Catholic faith community. Many of the bands who perform at Appaloosa Music Festival identify as Christian (though the music itself is mainly secular), and every year on Sunday before the first musical act, Mass is celebrated.

The Appaloosa Music Festival celebrated their fifth year in 2019. For their fifth anniversary, the event expanded from two days of music to three.

There was no festival in 2020 due to the Covid-19 Pandemic.

In 2021, the festival returned with acts including: Scythian, Young Dubliners, Dustbowl Revival, Mink's Miracle Medicine, Arbo, Honeyday, Bill and the Belles, and His & Hers. A thunderstorm on Saturday night prevented Dustbowl Revival from closing out the day on the main stage, but undeterred, they moved the show into the beer tent. Due to scheduling complications, the festival was held in mid-August instead of over Labor Day weekend.

The 2022 lineup featured headliner Molly Tuttle who was promoting her album "Crooked Tree," which later won a Grammy for "Best Bluegrass Album of 2022."

== Acts ==
Notable performers have included: Scythian, Molly Tuttle, Young Dubliners, Dustbowl Revival, Steep Canyon Rangers, Gaelic Storm, Aztec Sun, The Black Lillies, Mipso, Penny and Sparrow, Marie Miller, Humming House, Billy Strings, The Accidentals, and Lowland Hum.
