= Turmoil & Tinfoil =

Studio album by Billy Strings
- Released: September 22, 2017
- Recorded: January 3–9 and March 11–12, 2017
- Studio: GBP Studios, East Lansing, MI; Sunset Sound, Nashville, TN
- Genre: Bluegrass
- Length: 1:00:38
- Label: Apostol Recording Company
- Producer: Glenn Brown & Billy Strings

Billy Strings chronology
Turmoil & Tinfoil (2017)	Home (2019)

Turmoil & Tinfoil is the debut solo studio album by American bluegrass musician Billy Strings. It was released following two collaborations with Don Julin, Rock of Ages, and Fiddle Tune X and precedes his second studio album Home. Released on September 22, 2017, it reached number three on the Billboard Bluegrass Albums chart, remaining in that position for seven consecutive weeks.

Turmoil & Tinfoil reached number eighteen on the Billboard Heatseekers chart.

Band members included Brad Tucker on upright bass, Drew Matulich on mandolin, and Billy Failing on five-string banjo.

== Overview and meaning ==
The album covers a great range of topics including racism, drug addiction, relationships, and suicide.

== Reception ==
Professional ratings
Review scores
Source	Rating
Songlines	4/5
Country Exclusive	6/10

Turmoil & Tinfoil received generally positive reviews. Garret K. Woodward of Rolling Stone described the collection as "[not] afraid to look forward or celebrate youth."

== Track listing ==
All tracks are written by William Apostol, except "Salty Sheep" (Traditional).

No.	Title	Length
1.	"On the Line"	3:53
2.	"Meet Me at the Creek"	9:37
3.	"All of Tomorrow"	4:01
4.	"While I'm Waiting Here"	4:39
5.	"Living Like an Animal"	4:27
6.	"Turmoil & Tinfoil"	6:26
7.	"Salty Sheep"	4:44
8.	"Spinning"	2:40
9.	"Dealing Despair"	3:02
10.	"Pyramid Country"	4:43
11.	"Doin' Things Right"	4:16
12.	"These Memories Of You"	3:39
13.	"107"	6:31
Total length:		1:00:38

== Personnel ==
The Band

- Billy Strings – guitar, vocals, banjo, Buchla synthesizer, digital guitar
- Billy Failing – banjo, vocals
- Drew Matulich – mandolin
- Brad Tucker – bass, vocals

Additional musicians

- John Mailander – fiddle (3, 9, 11)
- Shad Cobb – fiddle (3)
- Glenn Brown – theremin and Harmonium (3, 6)
- Molly Tuttle – vocals (3)
- Miss Tess Reitz – vocals (3)
- Peter "Madcat" Ruth – harmonica and Jew's harp (5)
- Bryan Sutton – guitar (7)
- Terry Barber – vocals (12)

Technical

- Glenn Brown – producer, engineer, mixing, mastering
- Keith Kinnear – assistant engineer
- Koehen Terry – assistant engineer
- JJ Horner – cover art
- Bill Orner – design and layout
