= My Bluegrass Heart =

Studio album by Béla Fleck
- Released: September 10, 2021
- Genre: Bluegrass
- Length: 105:52
- Label: Renew
- Producer: Béla Fleck

Béla Fleck chronology
The Ripple Effect (2020)	My Bluegrass Heart (2021)

Singles from My Bluegrass Heart
- 1. "Charm School" Released: July 28, 2021; 2. "Vertigo" Released: August 13, 2021; 3. "Wheels Up" Released: August 2021

Professional ratings
Review scores
Source	Rating
Allmusic	3.5/5 stars

My Bluegrass Heart is a studio album by American banjo player Béla Fleck, the third of a trilogy that includes the 1988 album Drive and the 1999 album The Bluegrass Sessions: Tales from the Acoustic Planet, Vol. 2. My Bluegrass Heart features guest appearances from Sam Bush, Jerry Douglas, Stuart Duncan, Edgar Meyer, Bryan Sutton, Billy Strings, Chris Thile, Noam Pikelny, Sierra Hull, Molly Tuttle, Tony Trischka, Michael Cleveland and David Grisman.

The first single, "Charm School" featuring Billy Strings and Chris Thile, was released on July 28, 2021. The second single, "Vertigo" featuring Sam Bush, Stuart Duncan, Edgar Meyer, and Bryan Sutton, was released on August 13.

The album won the Grammy Award for Best Bluegrass Album at the 2021 Grammy Awards.

== Track listing ==
Disc A

1. Vertigo (feat. Sam Bush, Stuart Duncan, Edgar Meyer & Bryan Sutton)
2. The Old North Woods
3. Slippery Eel (feat. Billy Strings & Chris Thile)
4. Hug Point (feat. Sierra Hull & Molly Tuttle)
5. Boulderdash (feat. Tony Trischka & Noam Pikelny)
6. Our Little Secret
7. Round Rock (feat. Michael Cleveland & Jerry Douglas)
8. Baptist Pumpkin Farm
9. Charm School (feat. Billy Strings & Chris Thile)

Disc B

1. Strider (feat. Sierra Hull & Molly Tuttle)
2. This Old Road (feat. David Grisman and Billy Strings)
3. Us Chickens
4. Sour Grapes
5. Hunky Dory
6. Tentacle Dragon (Revenge of the) [feat. Billy Strings]
7. Bum's Rush (feat. Sam Bush, Jerry Douglas, Stuart Duncan, Edgar Meyer & Bryan Sutton)
8. Hunter's Moon
9. Wheels Up (feat. Sierra Hull & Molly Tuttle)
10. Psalm 136 (feat. Chris Thile)
