= Frank Solivan =

- Born: March 7, 1977 (age 49); Modesto, California
- Genres: Bluegrass
- Occupations: Musician; singer
- Instruments: Mandolin; guitar; violin
- Years active: 2005–present
- Labels: Fiddlemon, Compass Records
- Website: dirtykitchenband.com

Frank Larry Solivan is an American mandolinist, recording artist, composer, and leader of the progressive bluegrass band Dirty Kitchen.

== Biography ==
=== Early life ===
Solivan grew up near Modesto, California. His grandmother on his father's side played mandolin and fiddle. His father plays the banjo, guitar, bass, and mandolin. His mother's side of the family included classical violin and cello players. He fell in love with bluegrass music at an early age. Solivan formed his first band, Generation Gap in the late 1980s. They once opened for Ralph Stanley at a show in California.

In 1995, at age 18, Solivan moved to Alaska and won a scholarship to the University of Alaska Anchorage in Anchorage. He was first chair violin in the symphony orchestra and played mandolin in his friend Ginger Boatwright's band. He studied with Walter Olivaris at UAA. One of the jobs Solivan had was working at a plumbing and heating warehouse. He also operated forklifts and drove a school bus as well as delivery trucks. In 2002, he recorded his first solo album I Am a Rambler when he temporarily moved to Nashville from Alaska to pursue musical goals. He was assisted by friends including David Grier, Rob Ickes, and Shad Cobb.

=== Country Current ===
In 2003, Solivan auditioned and was offered the electric guitar position in the U.S. Navy, service band Country Current. He played electric guitar in their country band in addition to mandolin and fiddle in their bluegrass band for six years. In 2006, while in the Navy playing with Country Current, he recorded and released a solo album Selfish Tears.

=== Dirty Kitchen ===
After being in the Navy, Solivan began his own band. Besides Solivan (mandolin), the lineup of Dirty Kitchen includes Mike Munford (banjo), Chris Luquette (guitar), and Jeremy Middleton (bass). The band name is a reference to the gourmet meals Solivan prepares for friends and family (and the title of one of Solivan's instrumental songs).

Frank Solivan and Dirty Kitchen have released four studio albums: Frank Solivan & Dirty Kitchen in 2010, On the Edge in 2013 (after signing with Compass Records), and Cold Spell in 2014. and If You Can't Stand the Heat (2019).

=== Family, Friends & Heroes ===
Solivan's third solo project Family, Friends & Heroes was released in 2016 and features members of Dirty Kitchen, relatives in addition to John Cowan, Shawn Camp, Jerry Douglas, Sam Bush, Jim Hurst, Megan McCormick, Rob Ickes, and Del McCoury. On "Wayfaring Stranger," Solivan's mother Lorene (now deceased) sings lead vocals.

=== Other projects ===
Solivan has toured with The Earls of Leicester when Tim O'Brien had conflicting commitments. He built his primary mandolin from scratch at a workshop under the tutelage of luthier Roger Siminoff.

=== Awards ===
In 2014, the album Cold Spell by Frank & Dirty Kitchen was nominated for a Grammy Award in the Bluegrass Album category. In 2013, Munford was voted Banjo Player of the Year by the IBMA, and guitarist Chris Luquette received the Momentum Award for Performance Instrumentalist.

In 2014 Dirty Kitchen received four IBMA award recognitions:

- Solivan was nominated for Male Vocalist of the Year and Mandolin Player of the Year
- Munford was nominated for Banjo Player of the Year
- Frank Solivan & Dirty Kitchen won Instrumental Group of the Year award

In 2016, Frank Solivan & Dirty Kitchen were again the IBMA Instrumental Group of the Year. In 2019, The album If You Can't Stand The Heat by Frank Solivan & Dirty Kitchen was nominated for a Grammy in the Bluegrass Album category.

== Discography ==
=== Solo albums ===
- 2002: I am a Rambler (Fiddlemon) as Frank Solivan II
- 2006: Selfish Tears (Fiddlemon) as Frank Solivan II
- 2016: Family, Friends & Heroes (Compass)

=== As a member of Frank Solivan and Dirty Kitchen ===
- 2010: Frank Solivan & Dirty Kitchen (Fiddlemon)
- 2013: On The Edge (Compass)
- 2014: Cold Spell (Compass)
- 2019: If You Can't Stand the Heat (Compass)

=== Other appearances ===
- 2005: Gordon Titcomb-The Last Train (Rising Son Records)
- 2007: Bill Emerson-Bill Emerson and the Sweet Dixie Band (Rebel Records)
- 2014: John Cowan-Sixty (Compass)-vocals on track 6, "Rising From The Ashes"
