= Billy Strings =

American bluegrass musician (born 1992)

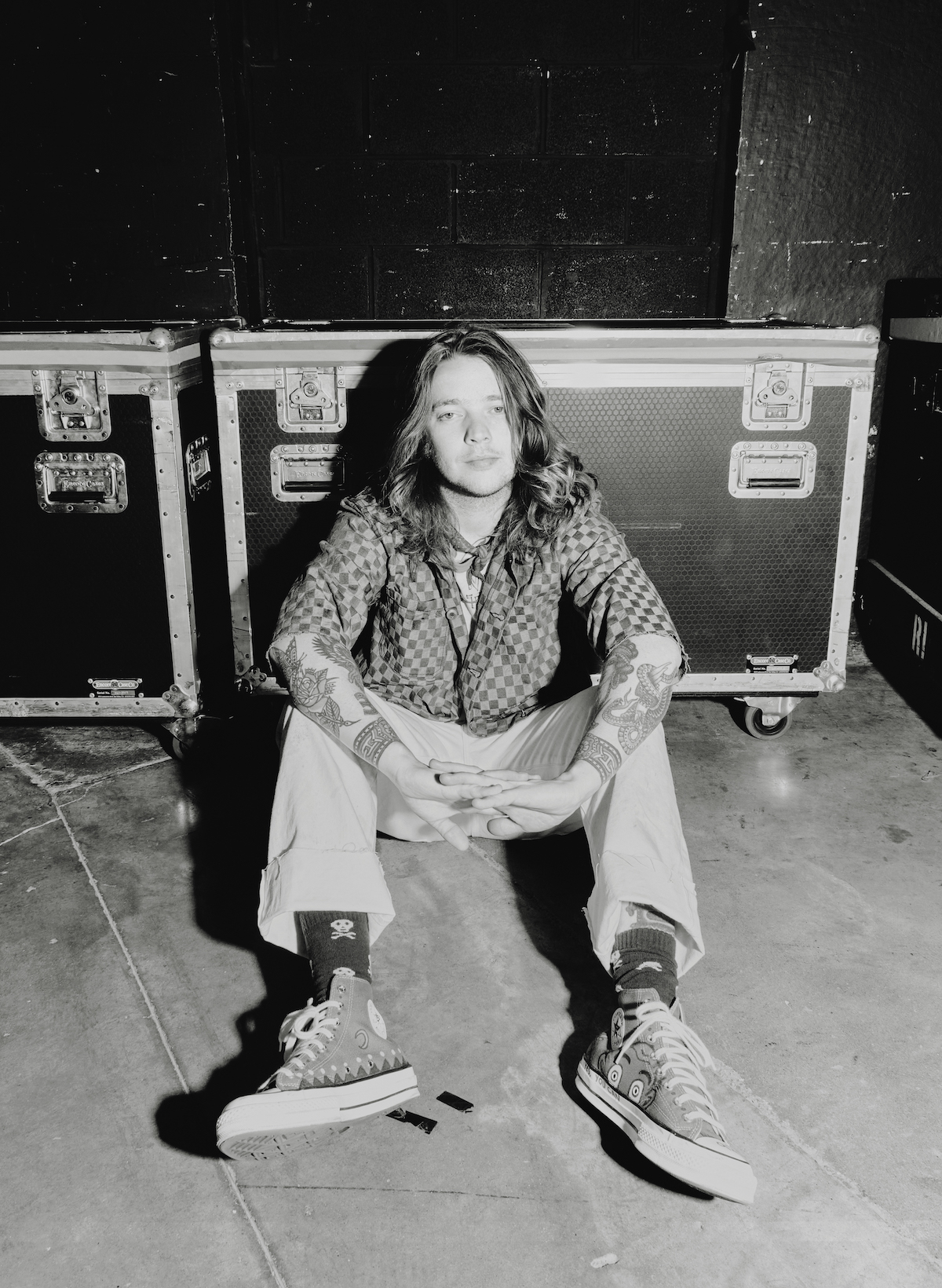
- Strings in 2023

Background information
- Born: William Lee Apostol; October 3, 1992 (age 34); Lansing, Michigan, U.S.
- Origin: Ionia, Michigan, U.S.
- Genres: Bluegrass; progressive bluegrass; Americana; roots rock; outlaw country; jam band; psychedelia
- Occupations: Singer; songwriter; musician
- Instruments: Vocals; guitar; banjo
- Years active: 2013–present
- Labels: Rounder; Reprise
- Spouse: Ally Dale (m. 2023)
- Website: Official website

William Lee Apostol (born October 3, 1992), known by the stage name Billy Strings, is an American guitarist, singer, songwriter, and bluegrass musician. Three of his albums, Home, Live Vol. 1, and Highway Prayers, won the Grammy Award for Best Bluegrass Album, in 2021, 2025, and 2026 respectively.

== Early life ==
Strings was born William Lee Apostol on October 3, 1992, in Lansing, Michigan. His biological father died of a heroin overdose when he was two, and his mother remarried Terry Barber, an accomplished amateur bluegrass musician, whom Strings regards as his father. The family later moved to Morehead, Kentucky, and then to Muir, Michigan. While he was still a preteen, his parents became addicted to methamphetamine. Strings left the family home at the age of 13 and went through a period of hard drug use. His family eventually achieved sobriety; Strings stopped using hard drugs and alcohol, consuming only cannabis and other "light drugs" (e.g., psychedelics).

Barber was a heavy influence on his stepson, introducing him to traditional bluegrass artists at a young age, including Doc Watson, Del McCoury, David Grisman, Bill Monroe, John Hartford, Ralph Stanley, Earl Scruggs, and Larry Sparks. Strings is also a rock and metal fan, influenced by Jimi Hendrix, Johnny Winter, Black Sabbath, Widespread Panic, Phish, the Grateful Dead, Pearl Jam, Primus, Def Leppard, Between the Buried and Me, and Cryptopsy, and played in hard rock and indie rock bands in his teens.

Apostol got his stage name, Billy Strings, from his aunt, who saw his ability on multiple traditional bluegrass instruments.

== Career ==
=== Beginnings, Turmoil & Tinfoil (2012–2019) ===
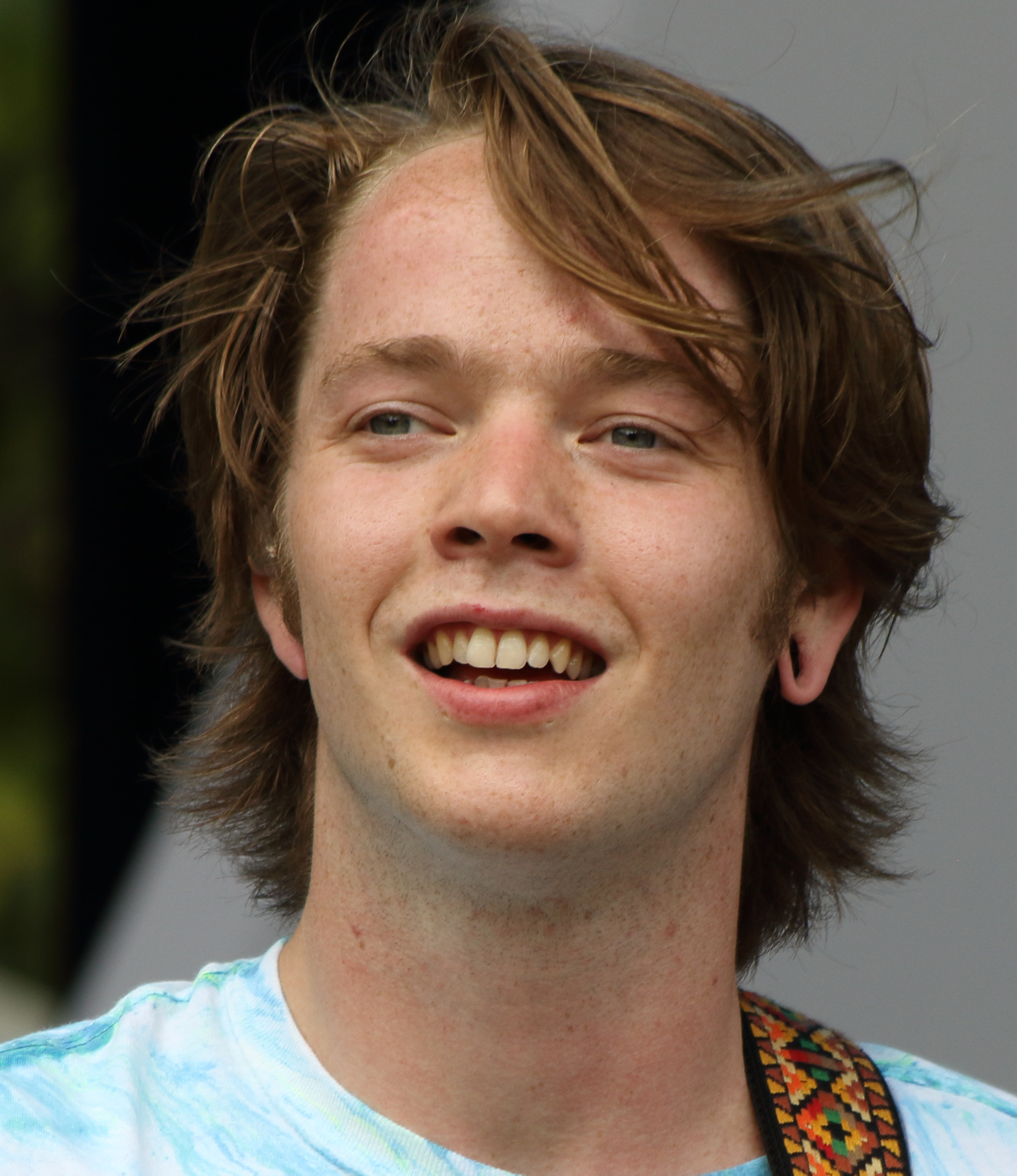
Strings at Bristol Rhythm and Roots Festival, 2017

After graduating from Ionia High School in 2011, Strings moved to Traverse City, Michigan. In 2012, Don Julin, a mandolin player from Traverse City and author of Mandolin for Dummies, asked Strings to join him on a paying gig. The partnership lasted for the next four years, after which Strings relocated to Nashville.

Rolling Stone named Strings one of the Top Ten New Country Artists to Know in 2017. On February 12, 2018, Rolling Stone published an article titled "Bluegrass Prodigy Billy Strings Plots 2018 Spring Tour", saying: "Billy Strings doesn't have any trouble living up to his name. [He is] one of the latest breakneck guitar pickers to emerge in the bluegrass world." The International Bluegrass Music Association awarded him with the Momentum Instrumentalist of the Year award in 2016. Bluegrass Situation named him a scene tastemaker in 2016. Lisa Snedeker of HuffPost proclaimed Turmoil & Tinfoil as one of the best albums of 2017, writing: "In September it charted at No. 3 on the Billboard Bluegrass charts. 'Nuff said." In March 2018, Rolling Stone released Strings' debut music video for his song "Dealing Despair" from his album Turmoil & Tinfoil. He planned to play over 200 shows in 2018.

He has been invited to play on stage with artists including Phish, Dierks Bentley, Del McCoury, Bill Kreutzmann, Bob Weir, David Grisman, Tommy Emmanuel, Larry Keel, Sam Bush, The Marcus King Band, Greensky Bluegrass, The Infamous Stringdusters, The String Cheese Incident, Leftover Salmon, Widespread Panic, Tool, Dead & Company, Zach Top, and more. He has performed at festivals including Frankfort Bluegrass Festival (Frankfort, IL), Hookahville, Blue Ox, Pickathon, Merlefest, DelFest, High Sierra Music Festival, Lollapalooza, Grey Fox Bluegrass Festival, Telluride Bluegrass Festival, John Hartford Memorial Festival, Aiken Bluegrass Festival, Appaloosa Music Festival, Wheatland Music Festival, Red Wing Roots Music Festival, Bristol Rhythm & Roots, Rooster Walk, French Broad River Festival, Makers Trail Festival, Under the Big Sky Festival and the All Good Presents 4848 Festival. At Grey Fox, he served as the very first Artist in Residence in 2017 and 2018. Strings has appeared on famous PBS musical TV programs Austin City Limits and Bluegrass Underground. He has toured with Greensky Bluegrass, The Infamous Stringdusters, Leftover Salmon, I'm With Her, Cabinet and others. Of those bands he played with early in his career, he has cited Greensky Bluegrass specifically as a major influence and his "favorite band."

In February 2017, Strings was named one of the six new rising stars of bluegrass by Acoustic Guitar. He also collaborated with Molly Tuttle on the songs "Sittin' on Top of the World" and "Billy in the Lowground".

In March 2018, PBS announced that Strings was to be the inaugural performer at the new cave for the renowned series Bluegrass Underground in the caverns of Pelham, Tennessee.

=== Home and Renewal (2019–2021) ===
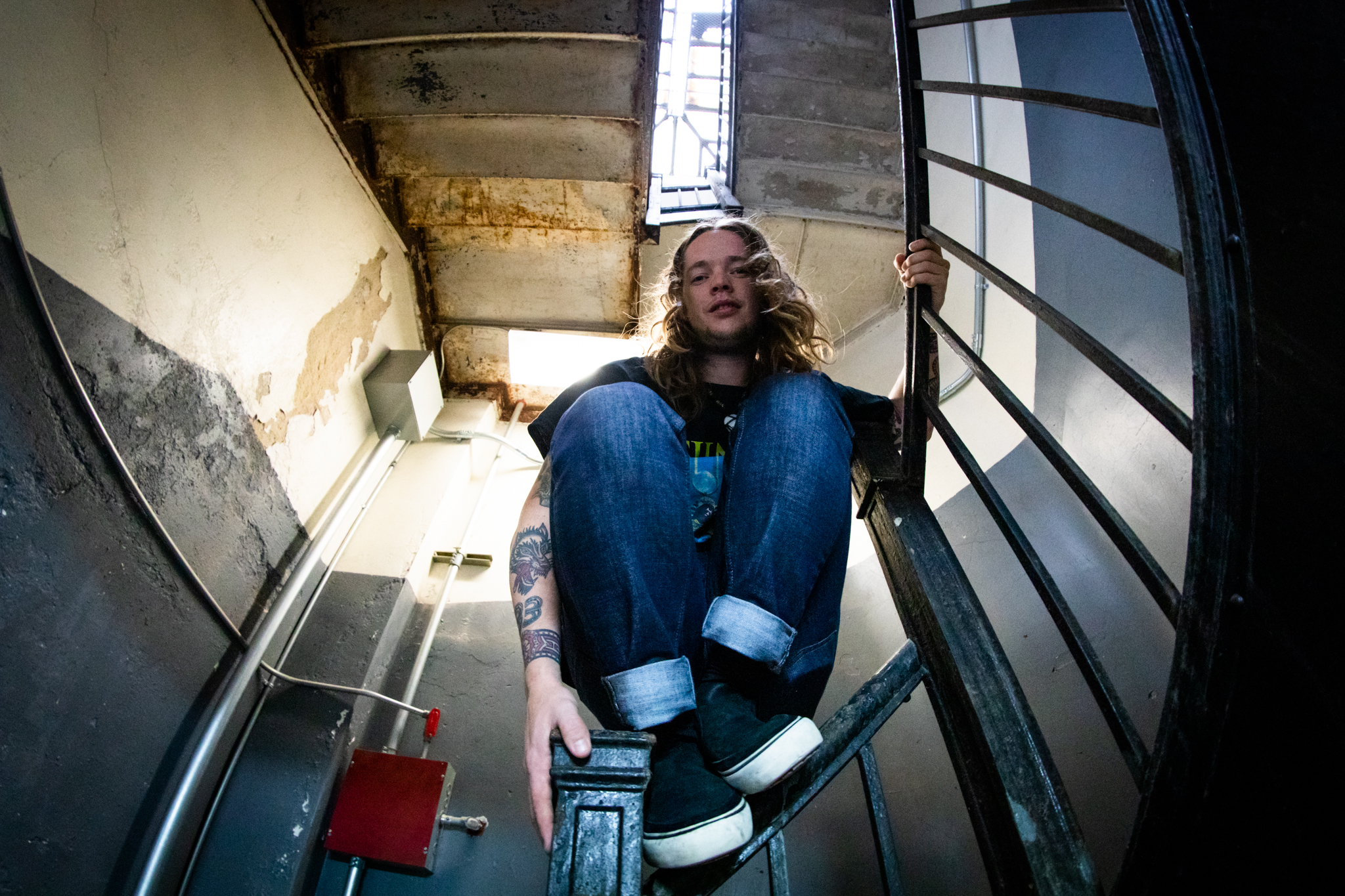
Strings in 2019

In January 2019, Rolling Stone wrote an article titled "Why Guitarist Billy Strings Is the Bluegrass Star You Don't Want to Miss." He was signed to Rounder Records in June 2019. Strings released his album Home (produced and engineered by Glenn Brown) under the label on September 27, 2019. It became his most successful release yet, reaching No. 1 on the Heatseekers Albums and Bluegrass Albums charts, as well as debuting at No. 11 on the Emerging Artists Chart. On September 26, 2019, Billy Strings was voted the International Bluegrass Music Association Guitar Player of the Year in Raleigh, North Carolina.

His album Home won the Grammy for Best Bluegrass Album at the 63rd Annual Grammy Awards.

In 2021, he joined Bill Kreutzmann's Billy & the Kids for five shows, along with James Casey (saxophone).

As a solo artist, he was part of the Newport Folk Festival in July 2021. On September 24, 2021, he released his third studio album, Renewal.

=== Me/And/Dad and live releases (2022–2024) ===
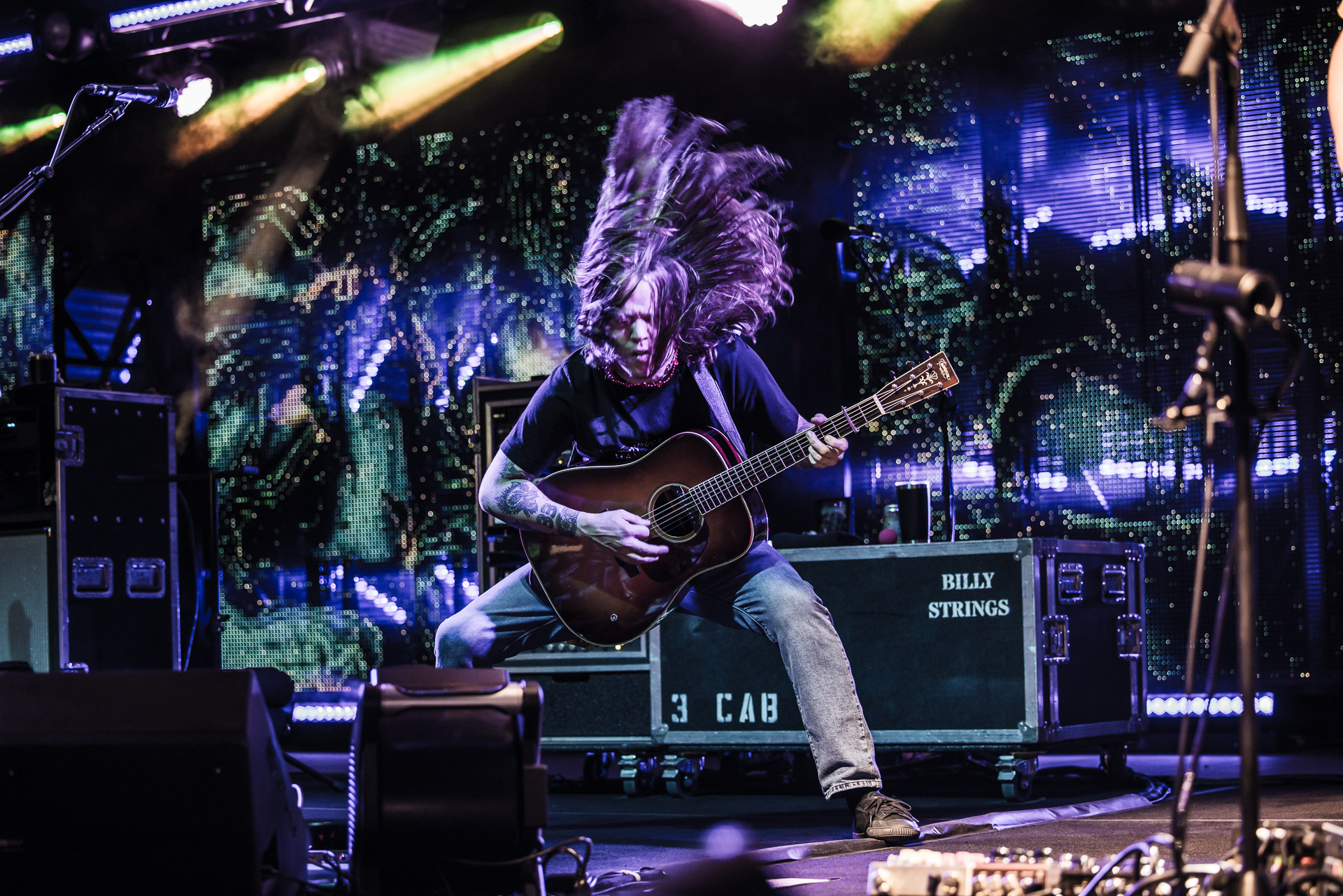
Strings in 2023

Strings' touring band was expanded from a quartet to a five-piece when frequent guest fiddler Alex Hargreaves was asked to become a permanent member during a show in Baltimore on July 3, 2022. The band consists of Billy Failing (banjo), Royal Masat (bass), Jarrod Walker (mandolin) and Alex Hargreaves (fiddle).

At the 2022 International Bluegrass Music Awards, Strings was nominated for six awards, winning Entertainer of the Year for the second consecutive year, while "Red Daisy" won Song of the Year.

On October 3, 2022, Strings announced the album Me/And/Dad, a project with his father Terry Barber. While Barber is not his biological father, Strings has said, "Terry raised me and taught me how to wipe my ass, tie my shoes, and play guitar. That's my fucking dad."

The album, released in November 2022, is a collection of traditional, country and bluegrass music from George Jones, Doc Watson, Hank Thompson, A.P. Carter and others. The same day the album was announced, "Long Journey Home" / "Life to Go" was released as a two-song single. Barber takes the lead vocal on the Jones-written song "Life to Go".

On December 8, 2023, Strings released his first official live recording. The 38-minute long single, recorded on March 4, 2023, at Lawrence Joel Veterans Memorial Coliseum in Winston-Salem, North Carolina, contained a three-song medley of "Meet Me at the Creek", "Pyramid Country", and "Must Be Seven".

On July 12, 2024, Strings released his first full-length live album, Live Vol. 1. Announced on May 28, the album contained live recordings of eight tracks from 2023 and 2024. The album would go on to win the Grammy Award for Best Bluegrass Album at the 67th Annual Grammy Awards.

=== Highway Prayers (2024–present) ===
Strings' fourth studio album (and first for Reprise Records) Highway Prayers was released on September 27, 2024. The album reached the first No. 1 on Billboard's all-genre Top Album Sales survey dated October 12, 2024, the first bluegrass album to do so in over 20 years. On November 1, 2024, during a fall tour stop in Baltimore, Maryland, in support of the album, Strings performed the album in its entirety for the concert's first set. On January 24, 2025, Strings launched his Winter Tour in continued support of the album with three shows at Denver's Ball Arena. The 21,000-seat arena featured the biggest crowd he'd ever played for indoors on Friday night, only to top that crowd with a new personal best on Saturday night. As pre-planned weeks in advance, due to lower than expected ticket sales, Strings played Sunday's show for a reduced capacity configuration at Ball Arena. That same year, he recorded a bluegrass cover of "Yahoos and Triangles" for the end credits of the Hulu revival of King of the Hill.

On August 1, 2025, Strings performed an opening set for Dead & Company at San Francisco's Golden Gate Park as part of the Grateful Dead's 60th anniversary celebration. He later joined the band during their second set to perform "Wharf Rat".

On February 1, 2026, Highway Prayers won Best Bluegrass Album at the 68th Annual Grammy Awards.

Strings is also featured on Kacey Musgraves' seventh studio album, Middle of Nowhere, released on May 1, 2026. He is featured on the track "Everybody Wants to Be a Cowboy".

On June 30, 2026, Strings released the first single, "Burn the Other End", from his fifth studio album So Much for Goodbyes. The album, which was released on August 28, 2026, features original artwork created by Strings' late mother.

On August 29, 2026, Strings joined Canadian death metal band Cryptopsy onstage at Ionia Freak Fair in Ionia, Michigan, performing the band's song "Open Face Surgery" on electric guitar. Strings curated and headlined the two-day festival and later described Cryptopsy as "one of my favorite bands of all time."

== Personal life ==
Strings began dating yoga instructor Ally Dale in 2014 after meeting at the Ore Dock Brewing Co. in Marquette, Michigan. Dale also worked as his tour manager during the beginnings of his career. They married on September 9, 2023, in a private ceremony, after nine years of dating, at the Hoxeyville Music Festival venue in Wellston, Michigan. Musicians Trey Anastasio, Les Claypool, and Bob Weir performed at the ceremony. On June 22, 2024, they announced they were expecting their first child together. Their son was born in September.

On June 20, 2025, Strings announced that his mother, Debra, had died in her sleep. Just hours after learning of her death, Strings dedicated a show in Lexington, Kentucky to his mother. It was reported that Debra died of a drug overdose, just as Strings's biological father had.

On April 18, 2026, on the second night of a sold-out two-show run in Charlottesville, Virginia, Strings suffered a fracture of a tibia while performing a backside 180 skateboarding trick backstage prior to a planned encore at the John Paul Jones Arena. He subsequently posted an X-ray image of the injury on Instagram. As a result of his injury Strings was forced to postpone the four remaining spring tour shows to the summer.

== Discography ==
Billy Strings discography
- Studio albums: 5
- EPs: 2
- Live albums: 1
- Singles: 10
- Music videos: 10
- As featured artist: 7
- Collaboration albums: 3
- Other appearances: 8

=== Albums ===
==== Studio albums ====
Title	Album details	Peak chart position					Sales
Title	Album details	US	US Country	US Folk	US Grass	US Heat.	Sales
Turmoil & Tinfoil	Released: September 22, 2017; Label: Apostol; Format: Digital download, streaming	—	—	—	3	18	
Home	Released: September 27, 2019; Label: Rounder; Format: Digital download, streaming	—	41	11	1	1	US: 13,300
Renewal	Released: September 24, 2021; Label: Rounder; Format: Digital download, streaming	82	9	4	1	—	
Highway Prayers	Released: September 27, 2024; Label: Reprise; Format: CD, LP, digital download, streaming	22	8	6	1	—	
So Much for Goodbyes	Released: August 28, 2026; Label: Reprise; Format: CD, digital download, streaming	13	4	3	1	—	
"—" denotes album that did not chart or was not released in that territory.

==== Collaborations ====
Title	Album details	Peak chart position
Title	Album details	US
Rock of Ages (with Don Julin)	Released: December 31, 2013; Label: Self-released; Format: Digital download	—
Fiddle Tune X (with Don Julin)	Released: October 1, 2014; Label: Self-released; Format: Digital download	—
Me/And/Dad (with Terry Barber)	Released: November 18, 2022; Label: Rounder; Format: Digital download, streaming	37
Billy Strings and Bryan Sutton: Live at the Legion (with Bryan Sutton)	Released: April 7, 2025; Label: Reprise Records; Format: Digital download, streaming	—

==== Live albums ====
Title	Album details	Peak chart positions
Title	Album details	US
Live Vol. 1	Released: July 12, 2024; Label: Reprise; Format: CD, vinyl, digital download, streaming	58
Live from Apple Studios – Nashville, TN – June 17, 2025	Released: December 12, 2025; Label: Reprise; Format: Digital download, streaming	—
Live From NPR's Tiny Desk Record Store Day 2026 Edition	Released: April 15, 2026; Label: Reprise; Format: vinyl	—

=== Extended plays ===
Title	EP details	Peak chart position
Title	EP details	US Grass
Billy Strings	Released: June 10, 2016; Label: Self-released; Format: CD, digital download, streaming	—
Billy Strings | An OurVinyl Sessions	Released: 2018; Label: N/A; Format: Digital download, streaming	10
"—" denotes single that did not chart or was not released in that territory.

=== Singles ===
==== As lead artist ====
Title	Year	Peak chart positions	Album
Title	Year	US AAA	Album
"All the Luck in the World" (with Circles Around the Sun)	2020	—	Highway Butterfly: The Songs of Neal Casal
"The Great Divide" (with Luke Combs)	2021	—	Non-album singles
"Wargasm" (featuring RMR)	2021	—	Non-album singles
"Midnight on the Stormy Deep" (with Del McCoury)	2021	—	Non-album singles
"Globe" (with Fences)	2021	—	Non-album singles
"Fire Line"	2021	—	Renewal
"In the Morning Light"	2021	—	Renewal
"Long Journey Home" (with Terry Barber)	2022	—	Me/And/Dad
"Life to Go" (with Terry Barber)	2022	—	Me/And/Dad
"John Deere Tractor" (with Terry Barber)	2022	—	Me/And/Dad
"California Sober" (featuring Willie Nelson)	2023	—	Non-album single
"Listen to the Radio" (with Molly Tuttle)	2023	—	More Than a Whisper: Celebrating the Music of Nanci Griffith
"Gild the Lily"	2024	2	Highway Prayers
"Leadfoot"	2024	—	Highway Prayers
"Stratosphere Blues/I Believe in You"	2024	—	Highway Prayers
"Seven Weeks in County"	2024	—	Highway Prayers
"Burn the Other End"	2026	11	So Much For Goodbyes

==== As featured artist ====
Title	Year	Album
"Bells of Every Chapel" (Sierra Ferrell featuring Billy Strings)	2021	Long Time Coming
"Slippery Eel" (Béla Fleck featuring Chris Thile and Billy Strings)	2021	My Bluegrass Heart
"Charm School" (Béla Fleck featuring Chris Thile and Billy Strings)	2021	My Bluegrass Heart
"Dooley's Farm" (Molly Tuttle & Golden Highway featuring Billy Strings)	2022	Crooked Tree
"High Note" (Dierks Bentley featuring Billy Strings)	2022	Gravel & Gold
"For Your Love" (Michael Cleveland featuring Jeff White and Billy Strings)	2023	For Your Love
"Muscle Car" (Andy Hall featuring Billy Strings)	2023	Squareneck Soul
"Brown’s Ferry Blues" (Tony Trischka featuring Billy Strings)	2024	Earl Jam: A Tribute to Earl Scruggs
"Poor Davey" (Cris Jacobs featuring Billy Strings and The Infamous Stringdusters)	2024	One of These Days
The Devil Went Down to Deep Gap (Bryan Sutton featuring Billy String)	2026	From Roots to Branches
"Gentle on My Mind" (Tony Trischka featuring Billy String)	2026	Earl Jam 2
Open Face Surgery	2025	Blasphemy Made Flesh

=== Other charted songs ===
List of other charted songs, showing year released, selected chart positions, and originating album
Title	Year	Peak chart positions	Album
Title	Year	US	Album
"M-E-X-I-C-O" (Post Malone featuring Billy Strings)	2024	83	F-1 Trillion

=== Music videos ===
Year	Title	Album
2019	"Away From the Mire"	Home
2019	"Must Be Seven"	Home
2020	"Home"	Home
2020	"Watch It Fall"	Home
2021	"In the Morning Light"	Renewal
2021	"Heartbeat of America"	Renewal
2022	"Love and Regret"	Renewal
2022	"Long Journey Home" (with Terry Barber)	Me/And/Dad
2022	"Catch & Release"	—N/a
2023	"California Sober" (featuring Willie Nelson)	—N/a
2024	"Leadfoot"	Highway Prayers
2024	"Stratosphere Blues / I Believe in You"	Highway Prayers

=== Other appearances ===
Title	Year	Credited artist(s)	Album
"Slippery Eel"	2021	Béla Fleck (featuring Chris Thile and Billy Strings)	My Bluegrass Heart
"This Old Road"	2021	Béla Fleck (featuring David Grisman and Billy Strings)	My Bluegrass Heart
"Tentacle Dragon (Revenge of the)"	2021	Béla Fleck (featuring Billy Strings)	My Bluegrass Heart
"Road Trip"	2022	Cory Wong (featuring Billy Strings)	Power Station
"M-E-X-I-C-O"	2024	Post Malone (featuring Billy Strings)	F-1 Trillion
"Breathless"	2025	Ringo Starr (featuring Billy Strings)	Look Up
"Never Let Me Go"	2025	Ringo Starr (featuring Billy Strings)	Look Up
"Rosetta"	2025	Ringo Starr (featuring Larkin Poe and Billy Strings)	Look Up
"Everybody Wants to be a Cowboy"	2026	Kacey Musgraves (featuring Billy Strings)	Middle of Nowhere

== Awards and nominations ==
Billy Strings awards and nominations
Awards and nominations
Award	Wins	Nominations
Americana Music Honors & Awards	2	4
Grammy Awards	3	8
International Bluegrass Music Awards	6	16

Totals (Note: Certain award groups do not simply award one winner. They acknowledge several different recipients, have runners-up, and have third place. Since this is a specific recognition and is different from losing an award, runner-up mentions are considered wins in this award tally. For simplification and to avoid errors, each award in this list has been presumed to have had a prior nomination.)
- Wins: 11
- Nominations: 26

=== Americana Music Awards ===
The Americana Music Honors & Awards are awarded annually by the Americana Music Association to honor the best in Americana and American roots music. Strings has two wins from four nominations.

Year	Nominee / work	Award	Result
2020	Billy Strings	Emerging Artist of the Year	Nominated
2021	Billy Strings	Artist of the Year	Nominated
2022	Billy Strings	Artist of the Year	Won
2023	Billy Strings	Artist of the Year	Won

=== Grammy Awards ===
The Grammy Awards are awarded annually by the National Academy of Recording Arts and Sciences. Strings has three wins from eight nominations.

Year	Nominee / work	Award	Result
2021	Home	Best Bluegrass Album	Won
2022	Renewal	Best Bluegrass Album	Nominated
2022	"Love and Regret"	Best American Roots Performance	Nominated
2024	"California Sober" (featuring Willie Nelson)	Best American Roots Song	Nominated
2024	Me/And/Dad	Best Bluegrass Album	Nominated
2024	"High Note" (Dierks Bentley featuring Billy Strings)	Best Country Duo/Group Performance	Nominated
2025	Live Vol. 1	Best Bluegrass Album	Won
2026	Highway Prayers	Best Bluegrass Album	Won

=== International Bluegrass Music Awards ===
The International Bluegrass Music Awards are awarded annually by the International Bluegrass Music Association to honor the best in bluegrass. Strings has won seven awards from 16 nominations.

Year	Nominee / work	Award	Result
2019	Billy Strings	New Artist of the Year	Won
2019	Billy Strings	Guitar Player of the Year	Won
2020	Billy Strings	Guitar Player of the Year	Nominated
2020	Billy Strings	Entertainer of the Year	Nominated
2020	Home	Album of the Year	Nominated
2020	"Guitar Peace"	Instrumental Recording of the Year	Nominated
2021	Billy Strings	Guitar Player of the Year	Won
2021	Billy Strings	Instrumental Group of the Year	Nominated
2021	Billy Strings	Entertainer of the Year	Won
2022	Billy Strings	Entertainer of the Year	Won
2022	Billy Strings	Guitar Player of the Year	Nominated
2022	Billy Strings	Instrumental Group of the Year	Nominated
2022	Renewal	Album of the Year	Nominated
2022	"Red Daisy"	Song of the Year	Won
2022	"Ice Bridges"	Instrumental Recording of the Year	Nominated
2023	Billy Strings	Entertainer of the Year	Won

== Tours ==
- Winter Tour (2017)
- Spring Tour (2018)
- Fall Tour (2018)
- Spring Tour (2019)
- Winter Tour (2018)
- Spring Tour (2020)
- Winter Tour (2020)
- Summer–Winter Tour (2021)
- Spring Tour (2022)
- Summer Tour (2022)
- Winter Tour (2022)
- Spring Tour (2023)
- Summer Tour (2023)
- Fall Tour (2023)
- Spring Tour (2024)
- Summer Tour (2024)
- Fall Tour (2024)
- Winter Tour (2024)
- Spring Tour (2025)
- Summer Tour (2025)
- Fall Tour (2025)
- Winter Tour (2025)
- Spring Tour (2026)
- Summer Tour (2026)
- Fall Tour (2026)
- Winter Tour (2026)
