= Wila Frank =

- Born: Wilhelmina Frankzerda; April 2, 1998 (age 28); Oregon, United States
- Occupations: Singer-songwriter; Guitarist; Producer
- Years active: 2010s–present
- Musical career
- Origin: Nashville, Tennessee, United States
- Genres: Singer-songwriter; Folk; Indie rock; Bluegrass; Country
- Instruments: Vocals; Guitar; Fiddle
- Label: Not On Label
- Website: wilafrank.com

Wila Frank, (/wɪlə/ WILLA; born Wilhelmina Frankzerda; April 2, 1998) is an American singer-songwriter, guitarist, and producer known for her ethereal and cinematic folk music. Her debut album, Black Cloud, has been lauded for its emotional depth and intricate compositions.

== Early life ==
Wila Frank grew up immersed in music and nature, which heavily influenced her artistic sensibilities. Her upbringing in a rural environment fostered a connection to themes of grief, spirituality, and the natural world, recurring motifs in her music.

== Career ==
=== Debut Album: Black Cloud ===
Frank released her debut album, Black Cloud, in 2023. The album explores themes of loss, resilience, and human connection, combining lush instrumentation with poignant lyrics. Tracks such as "Black Cloud" and "Oh, Fate" have been highlighted for their haunting melodies and evocative storytelling.

=== Style and influences ===
Frank's solo work is often described as "cinematic folk," blending traditional acoustic elements with modern production techniques. Her songwriting draws from personal experiences and reflects on universal themes such as grief and renewal. She cites nature as both a spiritual and artistic influence, often describing her creative process as a "religion of nature."

== Paper Wings ==
In addition to her solo work, Frank is one half of the Americana duo Paper Wings. The duo, blends modern and traditional folk influences, and has released multiple albums and been praised for honoring folk traditions while crafting a contemporary sound.

== Discography ==
=== Solo ===
- 2023: Black Cloud
- 2024: Agua Verde EP

=== Paper Wings ===
- 2017: Paper Wings
- 2019: Clementine
- 2024: Listen to the World Spin

== Critical reception ==
Wila Frank's debut album, Black Cloud, has garnered attention for its emotional resonance and intricate compositions. NPR featured Frank in a music mix alongside artists Rufus Wainwright and PJ Harvey, describing her work as "introspective and cinematic," with the title track "Black Cloud" noted for its haunting beauty and depth.

Under the Radar praised the album's storytelling, emphasizing its ability to evoke both intimacy and universality, while Enigma called it "cinematic" and "introspective with scalpel-like precision."
