= Lindsay Lou =

American singer-songwriter

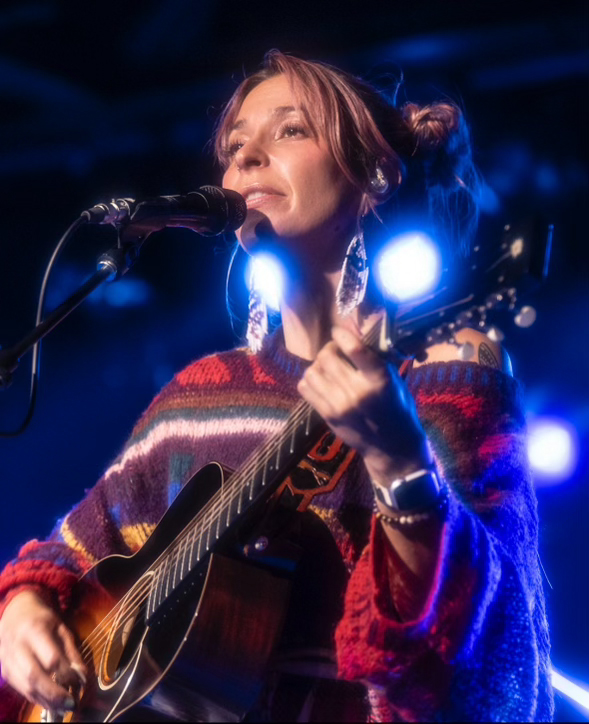
- Lindsay Lou performing live

Background information
- Born: Lindsay Rachel Petroff; 1986 or 1987 (age 38–39); Missouri, U.S.
- Origin: Lansing, Michigan, U.S.
- Genres: Indie folk; Americana
- Occupation: Singer-songwriter
- Instruments: Vocals; guitar
- Years active: 2009–present
- Formerly of: Lindsay Lou & The Flatbellys; Sweet Water Warblers
- Website: www.lindsayloumusic.com

Lindsay Rachel Petroff (born 1986 or 1987), known professionally as Lindsay Lou, is an American singer-songwriter and indie folk musician. She began performing bluegrass music professionally in 2009 with The Flatbellys in Lansing, Michigan. The band issued Release Your Shrouds in 2012, and their second album Ionia three years later. In 2018 Lou released the acclaimed Southland, and followed that up with the critically lauded Queen of Time in 2023. Her multipart project celebrating women in bluegrass, including the album Bluegrass Women, was presented following Lou's debut on the Grand Ole Opry in July 2026.

== Early life and career ==
Shortly after she was born in the Missouri coal mining country where her father was working, Lou's family moved to Iron Mountain in Michigan's Upper Peninsula. Lou's mother was one of a dozen siblings, which resulted in "cousins, aunts and uncles jamming together" at large, musical family gatherings in the remote northern area. While attending Michigan State University in 2008, Lindsay Petroff met The Flatbellys after singing at an open mic night at Dagwood's Tavern. When asked to join the group she took a stage name and began a ten-year run touring as Lindsay Lou & The Flatbellys.

The group, originally consisting of Lou, mandolin player Joshua Rilko, Joshua Brand and Jesse Myers, recorded and released the album Release Your Shrouds in 2012. The band toured heavily, while Rilko and Lou were married in 2011 and released a duo album Time & Luck in 2013. Lindsay Lou & The Flatbellys followed up with Ionia, named for the couple's Ionia, Michigan residence, with additional band members P.J. George and Mark Lavengood in 2015.

With Mark Lavengood leaving The Flatbellys, the group name was dropped in 2018 for the release of Southland by Lindsay Lou. The album was called "an experiment in stretching the boundaries of bluegrass to breaking point, with infusions of blues, jazz, roots and soul." Queen of Time was released in 2023 with Lou by now embarking on a solo career. In an interview, Chris Parton described music where "lyrics and voice weave together into something like a sonic dreamcatcher – snatching ethereal truths from the cosmos and translating them in ways the mind can just begin to process." The voice of Lou's grandmother is heard on the album, and reviews noted the memories of her grandmother provided Lou with inspiration throughout a difficult period.

Lou's debut on the Grand Ole Opry on July 31, 2026 was part of the Opry's 100th anniversary celebration, Opry 100. The performance included contributions from Emma Rose, Wila Frank, and Rhonda Vincent, and featured a song by Ola Belle Reed.

Bluegrass Women, a collaborative album presented by Lou and featuring her with female guest artists performing ten bluegrass songs written by women, was released on August 14, 2026. Guest artists include Tatiana Hargreaves, Laurie Lewis, Hasee Ciaccio, Maddie Witler, Alison Brown, Sierra Hull, Molly Tuttle, Aoife O'Donovan, and Sarah Jarosz. A companion YouTube documentary series of the recording sessions was also released.

== Personal life ==
Lou graduated from Michigan State University in 2008 with bachelor's degrees in human biology and Spanish. After marrying, Lou and Rilko moved to East Nashville, Tennessee, spending some time living across the street from fellow musicians Molly Tuttle and Billy Strings. Rilko and Lou were divorced in 2020.

== Discography ==
Studio albums

Lindsay Lou & The Flatbellys:

- Release Your Shrouds (2012)
- Ionia (2015)

Joshua Rilko and Lindsay Lou:

- Time & Luck (2013)

Lindsay Lou:

- Southland (2018)
- Queen of Time (2023)
- Bluegrass Women (2026)
