= Moraine Music Group =

American independent music publisher

Moraine Music Group is one of Nashville's leading independent publishers, with a reputation for unique songs that result in career-making hit singles. Some of those hits include Millionaire by Chris Stapleton, The Chicks first #1 single “There’s Your Trouble”, and Kenny Wayne Shepherd's “Blue On Black” (#1 for 17 weeks). Moraine's songs have appeared on numerous multi-million selling albums spanning various genres of music. Moraine has received over 50 music publishing awards, including 1998 SESAC Publisher of the Year and numerous Canadian Country Music Association Awards for Song, Single, Video and Album of the Year. Moraine's songs and artists have been included in feature films, television shows, and advertisements including Gareth Dunlop and SHEL's "Hold On" in The Best of Me, SHEL's "I Was Born A Dreamer" in a Toys R Us Christmas advertisement, and Gareth Dunlop's "Devil Like You" in Lucifer.

The company's songs are featured on releases by Taylor Swift, Kelly Clarkson, Trisha Yearwood, Wynonna, Tim McGraw, Faith Hill, Kenny Chesney, Jonny Lang, T.I., Kenny Wayne Shepherd, Joe Robinson, Rob Ickes & Trey Hensley, Solomon Burke, Tanya Tucker, Shelby Lynne, Alan Jackson, Lee Ann Womack, Garth Brooks, Gary Allan, Pat Green, Sister Hazel, Blackhawk, Lee Roy Parnell, Kenny Rogers and many others.

== Notable writers ==
- Brent Maher
- Gareth Dunlop
- Kim Richey
- SHEL
- Michael Logen
- Steven McKellar
- Shannon LaBrie
- Kevin Welch
- Kieran Kane
- Mark Selby
- Tia Sillers
- Billy Montana
- Johnny Reid
- Steve Mandile
- Craig Bickhardt
- Jack Sundrud of Poco

== Selected charting singles ==
=== Notable Singles ===
Song	Artist	Peak Chart Position	Song Facts
Millionaire	Chris Stapleton	#2	3× Platinum Single
Blue On Black	Five Finger Death Punch featuring Kenny Wayne Shepherd, Brantley Gilbert, and Brian May	#1	5× Weeks Mainstream Rock #1
More Than a Memory	Garth Brooks	#1	Highest Chart Debut of All Time
Why Not Me	The Judds	#1	ACM Song of the Year
Girls' Night Out	The Judds	#1	
Turn It Loose	The Judds	#1	
I Know Where I'm Going	The Judds	#1	
Rockin' with the Rhythm of the Rain	The Judds	#1	
Lesson In Leavin’	Jo Dee Messina	#1	
There's Your Trouble	Dixie Chicks	#1	
Bring On the Rain	Jo Dee Messina with Tim McGraw	#1	
Suds in the Bucket	Sara Evans	#1	Most Performed Song of the Year
Blue On Black	Kenny Wayne Shepherd	#1	17 Weeks At #1
Lesson In Leavin’	Dottie West	#1	
