= Summit (groups) =

The Summit format is used in jazz to bring together performers on a particular musical instrument. Though these recordings often feature other musicians (notably a rhythm section), the main instrument is focused upon in a celebratory way.

The saxophone quartet has since become a somewhat common format, and to a lesser extent the bass clarinet quartet. Additionally, all-percussion ensembles and a cappella groups are common and focus upon a single instrument in a similar way.

German MPS Records produced several albums of this type, including New Violin Summit, Alto Summit, Vibes Summit, The Gypsy Jazz Violin Summit, The String Summit, Trombone Summit and You Better Fly Away by Clarinet Summit.

== Saxophones ==
Saxophone Summit

2008: Joshua Redman, Michael Brecker, Dave Liebman, Joe Lovano, George Garzone

Soprano Summit(World Jazz WJCD-5/13)

1974: Kenny Davern, Dick Hyman, Bucky Pizzarelli, Bob Wilber, Marty Grosz, George Duvivier, Bobby Rosengarden, Milt Hinton, Tommy Benford

Alto Summit

1968: Alto Summit (MPS) by Lee Konitz, Pony Poindexter, Phil Woods and Leo Wright (with pianist Steve Kuhn, bassist Palle Danielsson and drummer Jon Christensen) (MPS Records)

1996: Phil Woods, Vincent Herring, Antonio Hart, (with Carl Allen on drums, Anthony Wonsey on piano, and Reuben Rogers on bass) (Milestone Records)

Baritone

Baritone Madness is a 1978 album from saxophonist Nick Brignola, featuring Pepper Adams, Ted Curson, Derek Smith, Dave Holland, Roy Haynes (Bee Hive Records).

== Flute ==
Flute Summit

1974: Jeremy Steig, James Moody, Sahib Shihab, Chris Hinze (Atlantic)

== Percussion ==
Percussion Summit

1984: Urszula Dudziak, Johnny Dyani, Okay Temiz, Gunter Sommer, Ed Thigpen, Mariusz Maurycy (tambourine), John Purcell (Moers Music)

== Vocal ==
Vocal Summit

Lauren Newton, Urszula Dudziak, Jeanne Lee, Jay Clayton, Bobby McFerrin, Bob Stoloff

== Trombone ==
Trombone Summit

1980: Albert Mangelsdorff, Bill Watrous, Jiggs Whigham, Kai Winding (MPS)

Trombone Workshop

1980: Albert Mangelsdorff, Bill Watrous, Jiggs Whigham, Kai Winding, with Allan Ganley, Horace Parlan, Mads Vinding (Pausa Records)

== Trumpet ==
Trumpet Summit

Dizzy Gillespie, Clark Terry and Freddie Hubbard recorded in 1980 an album called The Trumpet Summit Meets the Oscar Peterson Big 4, also featuring Oscar Peterson, Joe Pass, Ray Brown and Bobby Durham. Outtakes from this session were released on The Alternate Blues. Both albums were produced by Norman Granz and published by Pablo Records. Gillespie, Terry, Peterson and Durham previously recorded a live album at the 1977 Montreux Jazz Festival called Oscar Peterson Jam - Montreux '77, which featured Eddie "Lockjaw" Davis and Niels-Henning Ørsted Pedersen

Bobby Shew, Allen Vizzutti, Vincent DiMartino together also released albums as Summit Reunion (Chiaroscuro Records) .

== Vibes ==
Vibes Summit

1978: Dave Friedman, Karl Berger, Wolfgang Lackerschmid, Tom Van Der Geld

== Violin ==
Jazz Violin Session (Duke Ellington's)

1963: Svend Asmussen, Stéphane Grappelli, Ray Nance (Atlantic 1688)

Violin Summit

1966: Svend Asmussen, Stéphane Grappelli, Jean-Luc Ponty, Stuff Smith (MPS/Verve 15099)

New Violin Summit

1971: Don "Sugarcane" Harris, Jean-Luc Ponty, Nipso Brantner, Michal Urbaniak (MPS/Polydor 15335)

Texas Jam Session Featuring Four World Champion Fiddlers

1977: Benny Thomasson, Terry Morris, James Chancellor, Mark O'Connor (OMAC 1)

Gipsy Jazz Violin Summit

1979: Nipso Brantner, Zipflo Reinhardt, Shmitto Kling, Hannes Beckmann (MPS 15548)

Fiddle Fever

1984: Matt Glaser, Evan Stover, Jay Ungar (Flying Fish FF-247)

Jazz Violin Celebration

1985: Matt Glaser, Mike Marshall, David Balakrishnan, Darol Anger (Kaleidoscope 22)

Rhythm and Blues

1986: Michal Urbaniak, John Blake, Didier Lockwood (Gramavision 18-8608-1)

Fiddlers 4

2002: Michael Doucet, Bruce Molsky, Darol Anger (Compass 4334)

Celtic Fiddle Festival

Kevin Burke, Christian Lemaitre, Johnny Cunningham (Green Linnet 1133, 1189, 1216)

Kevin Burke, Christian Lemaitre, André Brunet, (Green Linnet 1230, Loftus Music 003, Loftus Music 006)

== Other instruments ==
Bluegrass Mandolin Extravaganza

1999: Sam Bush, David Grisman, Ronnie McCoury, Jesse McReynolds, Bobby Osborne, Ricky Skaggs, Frank Wakefield, Buck White (Acoustic Disc 35)

The Great Dobro Sessions

1994: Mike Auldridge, Curtis Burch, Jerry Douglas, Josh Graves, Rob Ickes, Bashful Brother Oswald, Stacy Phillips, Tut Taylor, Sally Van Meter, Gene Wooten (Sugar Hill 2206)

Rounder Banjo Extravaganza Live

1992: Tom Adams, Tony Furtado, Tony Trischka (Rounder 0296)
