= Charles Yingling =

American producer and recording engineer

- Born: November 7, 1978 (age 47); Amarillo, Texas, United States
- Genres: Americana, Rock, Country, Blues
- Occupations: Record producer, audio/mix/mastering engineer
- Instrument: Guitar
- Years active: 2002–present
- Website: www.yinglingmusic.com

Charles Yingling (born November 7, 1978) is an American producer and recording/mix/mastering engineer living in Nashville, Tennessee most noted for his work engineering the Willie Nelson track “Lost Highway” which won a Grammy Award in 2007.

Yingling produces and has engineered alongside producer Brent Maher on projects from artists including Merle Haggard, Willie Nelson, Ray Price, Gareth Dunlop, and SHEL most often working on analog consoles.

== Selected discography ==
A selected discography for Yingling is listed below.

- Can't Outrun The Blues LP - Trey Hensley (2026)
- Greyhound Bus Blues - Molly Tuttle & Liam St. John (2025)
- Man of The North - LP Liam St. John (2025)
- Young Love - Jamey Johnson & Ella Langley (2024)
- Believer -Liam St. John (2024)
- Anime - Flight Attendant (2024)
- Love Can Build A Bridge - Jelly Roll & K. Michelle (2023)
- Mama He's Crazy - Dolly Parton & Lainey Wilson (2023)
- Love Is Alive - Gwen Stefani & Blake Shelton (2023)
- Blood Harmony - O.N.E THE DUO (2023)
- John Deere Tractor - Molly Tuttle & Rob Ickes & Trey Hensley (2023)
- Life Is Like A Song - Kenny Rogers (2023)
- Have Mercy - LeAnn Rimes(2023)
- Why Not Me - Megan Moroney(2023)
- Fool's Desire - Gareth Dunlop (2023)
- Flight Attendant - Flight Attendant (2022)
- The Prize - Joe Robinson (2022)
- Love Hurts - Carly Moffa (2021)
- Building - Shannon LaBrie (2020)
- World Full of Blues - Rob Ickes & Trey Hensley (feat Taj Mahal (musician) (2019)
- Talk About Love: Music from the feature film No Postage Necessary - Charleene Closshey (2018)
- Many Moons Ago - Gareth Dunlop (2018)
- Just Crazy Enough - SHEL (2016)
- Songs from a Little Beach - Keith Sykes (2016)
- Looking Up to You: A Tribute to Jackson Browne (2014)
- Fire It Up - Johnny Reid (2012)
- Shel - SHEL (2012)
- A Place Called Loved - Johnny Reid (2010)
- Try to Scream - SHEL (2010)
- 8:30 Newfoundland - Mike Plume/Mike Plume Band (2009)
- Christmas - Johnny Reid (2009)
- Dance with Me - Johnny Reid (2009)
- Live at Rockpalast: One Night in Bonn - Mark Selby (2009)
- Sing: Chapter 1 - Wynonna (2009)
- The Wailin’ Canes - The Wailin’ Canes (2009)
- Somewhere Beyond the Roses - Kieran Kane (2007)
- Abstract Man [14 Track] - Tom Fuller Band (2008)
- Nashville Picks!, Vol. 1 - Mark Selby (2008)
- Nine Pound Hammer - Mark Selby (2008)
- Gunslinger - Keni Thomas (2007)
- Kane Welch Kaplin - Kieran Kane (2007)
- Kicking Stones - Johnny Reid (2007)
- Last of the Breed - Merle Haggard/Willie Nelson/Ray Price (2007)
- A Classic Christmas - Wynonna Judd (2006)
- Lost John Dean - Kieran Kane (2006)
- You Don’t Know Me: The Songs of Cindy Walker - Willie Nelson (2006)
- Flags of Our Fathers: A Soldier’s Story - Keni Thomas (2005)
- Ich Will Mehr - Tom Astor (2005)
- 42 Ultimate Hits - Kenny Rogers (2004)
- You Can’t Save Everybody - Kieran Kane (2004)
- Blue Highway - Mark Selby
- Everybody Has a Story - Various Artists
- Jason Eady - Jason Eady
- New Medicine - Michael Logen
