= Rob Kohler =

American jazz bassist, composer, educator, and author

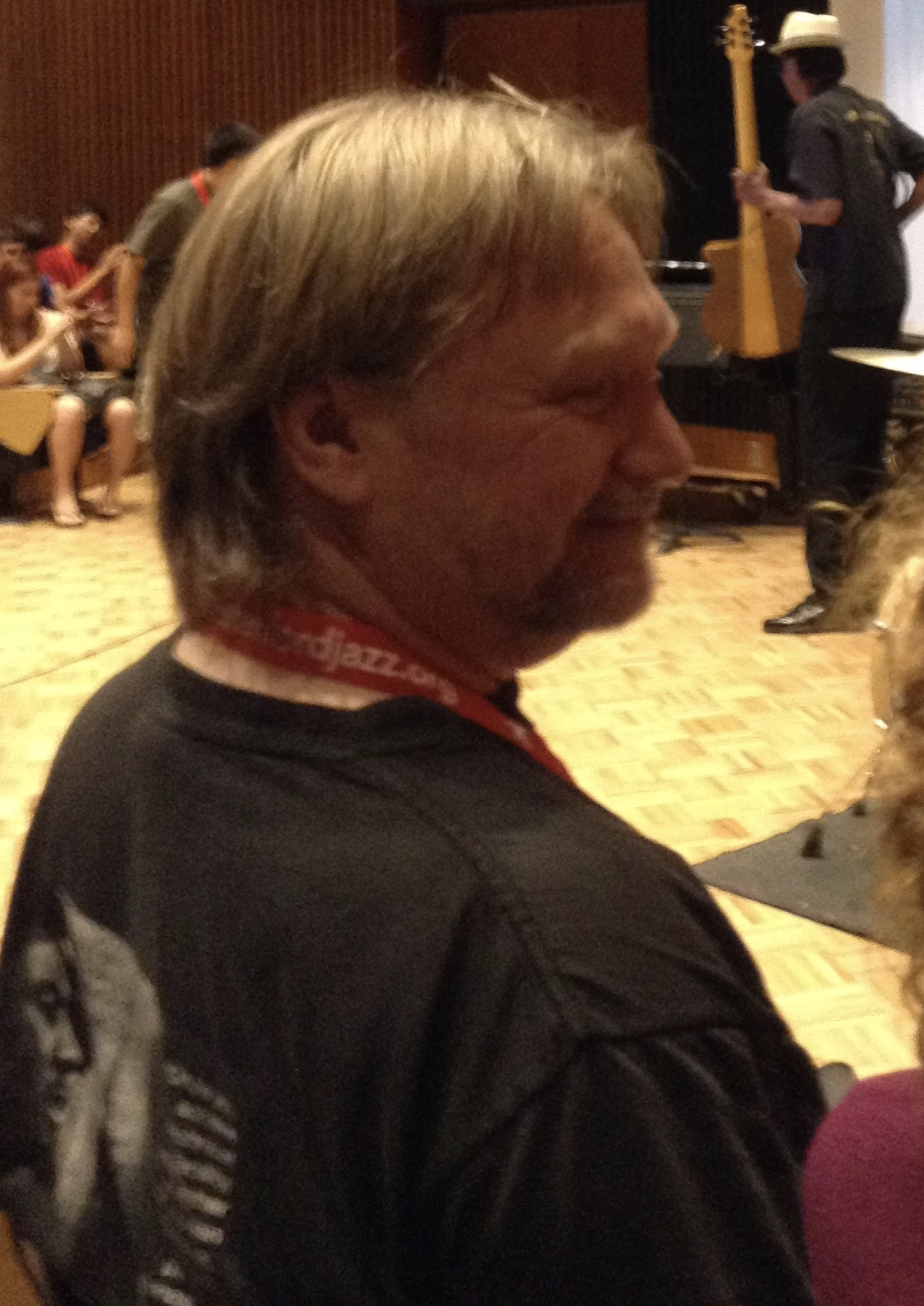
- Rob Kohler pictured in 2014

Background information
- Born: Robert Mahlon Kohler
- Origin: Great Falls, Montana
- Genres: Jazz
- Occupations: Educator, musician
- Instrument: bass
- Years active: 1981–
- Website: www.kohlermusic.com

Rob Kohler (born October 3, 1963) is an American jazz bass player, composer, educator, and author, best known as being the bassist for the band This World and a bass instructor at the Stanford Jazz Workshop.

== Early life ==
Raised in Montana, Kohler often performed music with his parents and siblings in his youth. He began playing bass at age 12. He has listed Jon Entwistle, Eberhard Weber, and Jaco Pastorius as early influences.

== Music career ==
Kohler has performed with artists such as Danny Gottlieb, Taylor Eigsti, John Stowell, Ambrose Akinmusire, Fabian Almazan, Anton Schwartz, and Leon "Ndugu" Chancler. With his older brother Lee Kohler, he was a founding member of the band In Flight in 1985. In Flight grew popular in Montana and performed at the Montreux Jazz Festival in Switzerland in 1989. After disbanding in 1990, Lee and Rob reformed the group in 1995 under the name This World. They released an eponymous album in 1996, produced by Cookie Marenco.

Kohler has been associated with Oregon-based Folk singer Alice Di Micele since 2000, appearing on several of her albums and touring with her often. Kohler works often with local Pacific Northwest musicians such as Olem Alves, Ann Tappan, and Jared Burrows. Since 2018, Kohler has toured with Halie Loren. With the Peterson Kohler Collective, Kohler released the acclaimed album Winter Colors in the winter of 2019.

== Teaching ==
Kohler began teaching at the Stanford Jazz Workshop in 1991. He was education director at SJW from 2006–2007. Kohler also taught at NOCCA in New Orleans, Louisiana, implementing a Middle School Jazz program there that lasted until 2009. He has been an instructor at the annual South Delta Jazz Workshop in Ladner, BC since 2003. In 2013, Kohler wrote and published a text book on Beginner Jazz Theory, entitled Music Theory from A to G.

== Personal life ==
Kohler's brother Lee Kohler and sister Kate Kohler are also prominent musicians, and the three collaborate often. Formerly based in Eugene, New Orleans, and Los Angeles, Kohler returned to Montana in 2014 and currently resides in Great Falls. He has three children.

== Discography ==
=== As leader ===
- Winter Colors (Origin Records, 2019) (With Peterson Kohler Collective)
- Harmony and Bells (2007) (with Clay Green)
- Spirit Session (2005) (with Morgan Scott and Jason Palmer)
- A Thousand Faces (1998)

=== As sideman ===
This World

- Intentional Feedback (2018)
- Celestial Skies (2013)
- Beyond the Beyond (2000)
- This World (1996)
- ...Imagine a Music (1986) (as In Flight)

With Alice Di Micele

- By Ebb & By Flow (2007)
- Alice Live (2000)

With Kate Kohler

- Wake Up! Songs for a Rainy Day (2015)
- Unexpected Romance (2010)

Inner Limits

- Live at the McDonald Theater (2005)
- The Sound (2005)

with Jared Burrows

- Aspects (2009)
- Plan on Stan (2003)
- December Sessions (2001)
- Northern Exposure (1999)

With others

- The Honorifics, ¡Wow! (2014) (Winner of Best Easy Listening Producer at 2014 Indie Music Channel Awards)
- The Real Cool Killers, Parades and Saints (2010)
- Len Aruliah Quartet, Full Circle (2007)
- Knotty Ensemble, Knotty Bit (2000)
