= This World (band) =

- Also known as: In Flight
- Origin: Bozeman, Montana
- Genres: World, progressive rock
- Years active: 1985–present
- Members: Lee Kohler; Rob Kohler; Mark Raynes; Kate Kohler
- Past members: Clay Green; Michael Blessing; Robi Johns
- Website: http://www.thisworldband.weebly.com/

This World (formerly known as In Flight) is a band founded in 1995 by brothers Lee Kohler and Rob Kohler in Bozeman, Montana. Lee is well known as a church organist, having performed with The Temptations and Bo Diddley. Rob is well known as a bassist and educator, teaching at the Stanford Jazz Workshop since 1991 and having performed/recorded with Danny Gottlieb, Julian Lage, Taylor Eigsti, Jeff Ballard, John Stowell, Alice Di Micele, and Michelle Shocked.

== In Flight (1985–1990) ==
In Flight was formed by Lee Kohler and Robi Johns at Montana State University in 1981. Lee's younger brother Rob joined the group in 1985. The trio consisted of Lee and Rob Kohler on keyboards and bass respectively, and was led by Robi Johns on guitar. They enjoyed considerable success in Montana, including many sold-out shows all over the state and considerable Radio and TV play. In 1989 they were invited to perform at the Montreux Jazz Festival in Switzerland. An album, ...Imagine A Music was recorded at The Music Source in Seattle in 1986 (the same studio where Nirvana would first record with Dave Grohl in 1991) and released on cassette. The band's sound was a unique blend of New Age music and Jazz. However, the band generally avoided such a classification. As Rob Kohler said in a 1988 interview with the Missoulian, the focus of the band's live performances was improvisation and spontaneity. In the same interview, Kohler emphasized the influence of the landscape of Montana on the band's music, saying "It seems that Montana is finally being recognized as a place where art is. Montana is such an inspirational place."

== This World (1995–present) ==
In 1995, Lee Kohler reformed the group, now with drummer Michael Blessing, under the name This World. Besides the addition of a drummer, the primary element that differentiates This World from In

nature of humanity and religion. The band quickly found success, performing around Montana. In 1996 they recorded an album, This World, with Grammy-winning producer Cookie Marenco. After the release of Beyond the Beyond in 2000, This World would not release another album until 2013's Celestial Skies.

== Band members ==
Lee Kohler, keyboards, lead vocals, rhythm guitar, lead composer

Rob Kohler, bass, lead guitar, background vocals

Kate Kohler, background vocals (1996–present)

Robi Johns, guitars (1985–1990)

Michael Blessing, drums, percussion (1995–1996)

Clay Green, drums, percussion (1996–2013)

Mark Raynes, drums, percussion (2013–present)

== Discography ==
As In Flight:

...Imagine a Music (1986), cassette

As This World:

This World (1995)

Beyond the Beyond (2000)

Celestial Skies (2013)
