= Blue Coast Records =

- Founded: 2007
- Founder: Cookie Marenco; Jean Claude Reynaud
- Genre: Various
- Country of origin: U.S.
- Location: San Francisco Peninsula
- Official website: bluecoastrecords.com

Blue Coast Records was founded by producer/engineer Cookie Marenco and French engineer Jean Claude Reynaud in 2007. The label is known for using the Direct Stream Digital hi-resolution format, using the labels’ proprietary recording technique Extended Sound Environment (E.S.E.). Artists include Kai Eckhardt, Tony Furtado, Rob Ickes, and others. The label is closely associated with OTR Studios, a recording studio located on the San Francisco Peninsula.

== History ==
Blue Coast Records was founded by producer/engineer Cookie Marenco and French engineer Jean Claude Reynaud in 2007. The first record from Blue Coast Records, Blue Coast Collection, was released in an SACD format. Marenco also founded OTR Studios, a recording studio located on the San Francisco Peninsula. OTR also serves as the home base for Blue Coast Records.

== Format ==
The label is known for their 96k and DSD hi-resolution downloads and their monthly special events, where they record musicians live and hours later make the music available for download. Most of their recordings are done using 2" analog tape, and using the labels’ proprietary recording technique Extended Sound Environment (E.S.E.). Releases are always recorded in the studio without the use of headphones, overdubs or digital effects.

== Artists ==
The following artists are on the label as of November 2013.

- José Manuel Blanco
- Brain
- Garett Brennan
- John R. Burr
- Marco de Carvalho
- Chi McClean
- City Folk
- Kai Eckhardt
- Tony Furtado
- Alex de Grassi
- Keith Greeninger
- Fiona Joy Hawkins
- Rob Ickes
- Houston Jones
- Valerie Joyce
- Dayan Kai
- Chris Kee
- Art Lande
- Jenna Mammina
- Jason McGuire
- Glen Moore
- Luis Perez
- Simone Raoux (former)
- Jane Selkye
- Christie Winn

== See also ==
- Direct Stream Digital
