= This World (This World album) =

Studio album by This World
- Released: July 1996
- Recorded: December 1995–April 1996, The Garage, Reese Creek Montana
- Genres: World, progressive rock, CCM
- Length: 61:38
- Label: Kohler Music Media
- Producers: Cookie Marenco, Rob Kohler, This World

This World chronology
...Imagine a Music (1986)	This World (1996)	Beyond the Beyond (2000)

This World is the first studio album by the band This World. The band's previous album, ...Imagine a Music, was released in 1986 when they were known as In Flight.

== Background ==
After In Flight disbanded in 1990, Lee Kohler reformed the group with his brother Rob and their friend drummer Michael Blessing in 1995. There was much interest in the group's work left over from their days as In Flight, and so funding was easily obtained for recording an album.

Many of the compositions were previously unperformed songs from In Flight. The group's composition process will generally start with one member bringing in an idea and the rest building off that idea until an entire song has been composed. Subsequently, each member composed their own parts for their instruments.

"Harvest Circle," composed by the band's bassist Rob Kohler, features Bobcat singers Frank Caplette, Shane Doyle, and Crit Held. This fusion between electric Jazz and traditional Native American music is Rob Kohler's trademark sound. This sound is clear on Kohler's album A Thousand Faces, released in 1998.

== Recording ==
The album was recorded at The Garage in Reese Creek, Montana. The studio had been built and was run by Michael Blessing, the band's drummer. Grammy Award-winning producer Cookie Marenco was flown in from Los Angeles to produce and engineer the album. Marenco, now the owner and founder of Blue Coast Records, has worked with many legendary musicians, including Max Roach, Paul McCandless, Brad Mehldau, Charlie Haden, and many others.

== Track listing ==
No.	Title	Writer(s)	Length
1.	"The Signs Above"	Lee Kohler (Music and Lyrics)	5:04
2.	"Fire or Light"	Lee Kohler	7:21
3.	"Inner City" (Instrumental)	Michael Blessing	5:01
4.	"Fanfare/This World"	Lee Kohler	14:27
5.	"Harvest Circle" (Instrumental except for Bobcat Singers)	Rob Kohler	7:23
6.	"All is Revealed"	Lee Kohler	5:38
7.	"The River"	Lee Kohler	10:15
8.	"All Life (Nation)"	Lee Kohler	5:45
Total length:			61:38

== Personnel ==
=== This World ===
Michael Blessing- Drums, percussion

Rob Kohler- Basses, guitar, vocals

Lee Kohler- Synthesizers, piano, guitar, lead vocals

=== Additional Musicians ===
John Kohler- Soprano Saxophone

Kate Kohler- vocals (credited as Cathy Kohler)

Frank Caplette, Shane Doyle, Crit Held - Bobcat Singers

== Release ==
The album was released on CD in the Summer of 1996 by Kohler Music Media, a company run by Kate Kohler. It is now available on many major online stores, including iTunes, Amazon, CD Baby, and many others. Excerpts from the album are also available on the band's SoundCloud, YouTube, and website.
