= The Great Dobro Sessions =

Studio album by various artists
- Released: September 18, 1994
- Recorded: 1994
- Genre: Country; Old-time music Bluegrass; Jazz
- Length: 73:31
- Label: Sugar Hill
- Producer: Jerry Douglas; Tut Taylor

Professional ratings
Review scores
| Source | Rating |
|---|---|
| Allmusic | link |

The Great Dobro Sessions is a 1994 country music and bluegrass album featuring an all-star line-up of 10 American resonator guitar players, produced by dobro players Jerry Douglas and Tut Taylor.

The album won the Grammy Award for Best Bluegrass Album at the 1995 ceremony.

== Featured artists ==
- Mike Auldridge: Resonator and steel guitar player, former member of bluegrass group The Seldom Scene, he is known for his swing style playing on eight-string resonator guitars. Auldridge is considered to have pioneered the development of the instrument in genres outside country and bluegrass. His emphasis on tone and clean playing have led to emulation the Auldridge tone being considered desirable among many contemporary resophonic guitarists. Auldridge died in 2012 following a near decade-long struggle with cancer.
- Curtis Burch: A member of the original New Grass Revival in the 1970s, and a guitarist as well as dobro player.
- Jerry Douglas: A leading contemporary dobro player and 13 time Grammy Award winner, Douglas leads his own band and is a member of Alison Krauss's Union Station. Douglas is one of the most recorded musicians in history, and has played on records with as varied a collection of musicians as Paul Simon, Tony Rice, Elvis Costello, and Eric Clapton.
- Josh Graves: Burkett "Buck 'Uncle Josh'" Graves is credited as the inventor of bluegrass resonator guitar style, which he developed by implementing banjoist Earl Scruggs's three-finger picking into his guitar playing whilst part of the Foggy Mountain Boys with Lester Flatt and Scruggs. Uncle Josh died in 2006 at age 79.
- Rob Ickes: The youngest performer on the album, he is a virtuoso player and a former member of the bluegrass group Blue Highway. In recent years he has become a regular member of the Tony Rice Unit, founded the acoustic music trio Three Ring Circle, and has recently recorded an album of Jazz standards with Nashville pianist and music teacher Michael Alvey.
- Pete "Bashful Brother Oswald" Kirby: A pioneering country resonator guitarist, he was a member of Roy Acuff's Smoky Mountain Boys and the Grand Ole Opry. Kirby died in 2002.
- Stacy Phillips: Resophonic guitarist and fiddler, noted for his unusual chord-based resophonic guitar playing. Phillips is also noted for producing a large volume of resophonic guitar instructional material. He died in 2018.
- Tut Taylor: Veteran resonator guitarist, he is notable for being one of the few steel guitarists to use a flat-pick (plectrum) rather than the more common finger-and-thumb picks. His long career has included collaborations with artists including John Hartford. Taylor died in 2015.
- Sally Van Meter: A modern style resophonic guitar and lap steel player, plays Scheerhorn resophonic guitars. Known for her tone and clean playing, she is considered one of the leading dobro players in the contemporary bluegrass scene.
- Gene Wooten: A country music veteran, he played with the Osborne Brothers, Del and Ronnie McCoury and on the Grand Ole Opry. He died in 2001.

== Track listing ==
1. "Fireball Mail" (Fred Rose) – 2:46
  - Performed by all the featured artists except Kirby
2. "Dobro Chimes" (Beecher Ray Kirby) – 3:04
  - Performed by Bashful Brother Oswald
3. "Just Joshin'" (Burkett Howard Graves) – 3:04
  - Performed by Josh Graves
4. "Poison Love" (Elmer Laird) – 1:56
  - Performed by Gene Wooten
5. "Birdland" (Joe Zawinul) – 5:24
  - Performed by Jerry Douglas
6. "Wave" (Antonio Carlos Jobim) – 5:20
  - Performed by Mike Auldridge
7. "The Last Rose of Autumn" (Stacy Phillips) – 3:34
  - Performed by Stacy Phillips
8. "Rainbow Bridge" (Curtis Burch) – 3:33
  - Performed by Curtis Burch
9. "Great Season Waltz" (Slavek Hanzlik) – 3:38
  - Performed by Sally Van Meter
10. "Scrapin' the Barrel" (Rob Ickes) – 3:14
  - Performed by Rob Ickes
11. "Little Green Pill" (Tut Taylor) – 3:15
  - Performed by Tut Taylor and Curtis Burch
12. "Day Tripper" (Lennon–McCartney) – 2:39
  - Performed by Gene Wooten
13. "Flatt Lonesome" (Lester Flatt/Josh Graves) – 4:12
  - Performed by Josh Graves and Tim Graves
14. "Abilene Gal" (B. White) – 2:58
  - Performed by Jerry Douglas
15. "McHattie's Waltz" (Kenny Baker) – 3:20
  - Performed by Rob Ickes
16. "Ace of Spades" (Traditional) – 3:40
  - Performed by Stacy Phillips
17. "Suitcase" (Curtis Burch) – 3:25
  - Performed by Curtis Burch and Jerry Douglas
18. "Cherokee Shuffle" (Traditional) – 3:31
  - Performed by Sally Van Meter
19. "Lonesome Dobro" (Tut Taylor) – 4:33
  - Performed by Tut Taylor and Curtis Burch
20. "Wake Forest" (Auldridge/Coleman) – 3:15
  - Performed by Mike Auldridge
21. "The End of the World" (Fred Rose) – 3:10
  - Performed by Bashful Brother Oswald

== Backing musicians ==
- Kenny Baker – Fiddle
- Russ Barenberg – Guitar
- Alison Brown – Banjo
- Mike Bub – Bass
- Sam Bush – Mandolin
- Vassar Clements – Fiddle
- Charlie Collins – Guitar
- Stuart Duncan – Fiddle
- Béla Fleck – Banjo
- David Grier – Guitar
- Roy Huskey, Jr. – Bass
- Viktor Krauss – Bass
- Ronnie McCoury – Mandolin
- Edgar Meyer – Bass
- Larry Perkins – Banjo
- Mark Schatz – Bass
