= Stoloff =

Stoloff is a surname. Notable people with the surname include:

- Benjamin Stoloff (1895–1960), American film director and producer
- Bob Stoloff (born 1952), American jazz musician
- Morris Stoloff (1898–1980), American composer
- Victor Stoloff (1913–2009), Russian Empire-born American film director, producer, and screenwriter
