= Winter Colors =

Studio album by Peterson Kohler Collective
- Released: September 20, 2019
- Recorded: September 2018
- Studios: Studio X, Seattle
- Genre: Jazz
- Length: 53:00
- Label: Origin
- Producers: Lee Kohler, Rob Kohler, David Peterson

Professional ratings
Review scores
Source	Rating
DownBeat	4/5 stars
AllAboutJazz	4/5 stars
Jazz Journal	3.5/5 stars

Winter Colors is a studio album by the jazz group Peterson Kohler Collective, released in 2019 on Origin Records.

== Content ==
David Peterson, Lee, and Rob Kohler are cousins who grew up in Montana. Peterson is a veteran of the Seattle jazz scene, teaching at Cornish College for 35 years. Peterson is best known for his work with Chuck Deardorf and Chet Baker. John Bishop, the drummer, is the founder of Origin Records. Brent Jensen, originally from Idaho, is a Seattle-based saxophonist who attended college with Rob Kohler.

The album includes original compositions by every member of the band except Bishop, two freely improvised tracks ("Grey Mist" and "White Flurries"), and a song composed by the Kohler brothers' father John Kohler.

== Critical reception ==
Critics were generally favorable of the album, praising its balance of versatility and cohesiveness. Many critics pointed to the familial connection and maturity of the players as particularly striking. The title track was singled out as exemplary of the album's signature sound, but the compositions were widely praised.

== Track listing ==
No.	Title	Music	Length
1.	"Winter Colors"	David Peterson	5:43
2.	"I Need You Too"	Leonard Read Kohler	6:05
3.	"Rise Up"	Rob Kohler	4:13
4.	"Graceful"	Rob Kohler	7:13
5.	"Grey Mist"	The Collective	2:55
6.	"The Wind Has Gone Down"	David Peterson	7:12
7.	"Danza"	Brent Jensen	5:19
8.	"White Flurries"	The Collective	1:25
9.	"M&M Blues"	John Kohler	6:40
10.	"Solstice Song"	David Peterson	5:48
Total length:			53:08

== Personnel ==
- David Peterson - guitar
- Brent Jensen - saxophone
- Lee Kohler - piano
- Rob Kohler - double bass and electric bass
- John Bishop - drums
