= The Best of Me (2014 film) =

- Theatrical release poster
- Directed by: Michael Hoffman
- Written by: Will Fetters; J. Mills Goodloe
- Based on: The Best of Me by Nicholas Sparks
- Produced by: Justin Burns; Denise Di Novi; Alison Greenspan; Ryan Kavanaugh; Nicholas Sparks
- Starring: Michelle Monaghan; James Marsden; Luke Bracey; Liana Liberato; Caroline Goodall; Gerald McRaney
- Cinematography: Oliver Stapleton
- Edited by: Matt Chesse
- Music by: Aaron Zigman
- Production company: Di Novi Pictures
- Distributed by: Relativity Media
- Release date: October 17, 2014 (United States)
- Running time: 118 minutes
- Country: United States
- Language: English
- Budget: $26 million
- Box office: $41.1 million

The Best of Me is a 2014 American romantic drama film directed by Michael Hoffman and written by Will Fetters and J. Mills Goodloe, based on Nicholas Sparks' 2011 novel. The film stars James Marsden and Michelle Monaghan with Luke Bracey and Liana Liberato.

Former high school sweethearts Dawson Cole and Amanda reunite after many years when they return to visit their small hometown, brought there by his surrogate father Tuck upon his passing.

Although panned by critics, the film did modestly well in the box office.

== Plot ==
The film—the story of Dawson and Amanda—moves between alternate scenes of the couple's relationship in 1992, and their current separate lives.

An explosion on the oil rig he works on off the coast of Louisiana nearly kills Dawson Cole. After his recovery months later, Dawson learns that Tuck, his close friend and surrogate father, has died. He returns home for the first time in almost twenty years to carry out Tuck's final wishes. Dawson arrives at Tuck's house to find that Tuck arranged for Dawson's high school girlfriend, Amanda, to heal some old hurt between them. Amanda is now married.

Flashbacks reveal the teenaged Dawson, born into a notorious criminal family, once left his abusive father's home to stay overnight in the garage of Tuck Hostetler, a local mechanic who had recently lost his wife. Tuck allowed Dawson to live with him and eventually considered him as his own son. Dawson and Amanda began dating in high school. On the afternoon of the prom, Dawson's father and brothers beat Tuck prompting the angry Dawson to prepare an ambush at his father's house, to kill him with Tuck's rifle. In the ensuing scuffle Dawson's cousin, an expectant teenage father, was unintentionally killed. Dawson testified against his father and brothers in exchange for a lighter sentence. Inelgible for parole for at least four years, he cut ties with Amanda, forcing her to choose college over awaiting his release.

In the present, Amanda and Dawson meet with Tuck's lawyer and learn that his wishes to be scattered at a cottage he owned with his wife. Dawson and Amanda spend a passionate night together, and while discussing future plans over lunch the next day Dawson is reminded she refused to visit him in prison. Amanda returns to her strained marriage to fulfill her family commitments and Dawson remains at Tuck's to restore the garden. Amanda splits from her husband and leaves Dawson a voicemail expressing her love. Dawson is attacked by his brothers and nearly killed when they push him in front of a moving train. He knocks them out and calls 911, but his father shoots him dead.

Amanda rushes to the hospital when her son is in a car accident, and learns he needs a heart transplant. That night, as a donor is found, Amanda dreams of Dawson sitting at her bedside. She's awoken by her mother with the news Dawson was killed by his father. A year later, Amanda's son calls with the news he knows the donor's name, and asks if she knew Dawson Cole. She returns to the house Tuck had left them, reads the letter Dawson had left her, telling her how much he loved her, and walks through the garden he had arranged for her.

== Cast ==
- Michelle Monaghan as Amanda Collier-Reynolds
  - Liana Liberato as young Amanda
- James Marsden as Dawson Cole
  - Luke Bracey as young Dawson
- Caroline Goodall as Evelyn Collier
- Gerald McRaney as Tuck Hostetler
- Sebastian Arcelus as Frank Reynolds
- Jon Tenney as Harvey Collier
- Clarke Peters as Morgan Dupre (attorney)
- Ian Nelson as Jared Reynolds
- Sean Bridgers as Tommy Cole
- Rob Mello as Ted Cole
- Hunter Burke as Abee Cole
- Schuyler Fisk as Older April
- Robby Rasmussen as:
  - Bobby Cole
  - Aaron Cole
- Julia Lashae as Clara

== Production ==
=== Development and casting ===
On June 17, 2011, Warner Bros. acquired the film rights to the novel The Best of Me by Nicholas Sparks. On March 15, 2012, it was announced that the studio had tapped screenwriter J. Mills Goodloe to adapt the book.

On September 27, it was reported that Warner Bros. was in final talks with Michael Hoffman to direct the film, Will Fetters was set to rewrite the screenplay, marking his second adaptation of a Nicholas Sparks novel, and Denise Di Novi was set to produce the film, along with Sparks and Sparks' agent Theresa Park as co-producers, marking Di Novi's fifth film collaboration with Sparks, Sparks' second time producing a film adaptation of one of his novels and Park's production debut. On July 25, 2013, Relativity Media acquired the distribution rights from Warner Bros., marking the studio's third film adaptation of a Nicholas Sparks novel. On October 22, Michelle Monaghan was cast to play the female lead Amanda Collier, and Ryan Kavanaugh was to co-produce the film. On October 24, the studio set the film for an October 17, 2014 release.

Paul Walker was originally cast to play the male lead Dawson Cole but died in a car accident on November 30, 2013, before filming began. On January 9, 2014, the studio offered James Marsden, who co-starred in the 2004 adaptation of Sparks' 1996 novel The Notebook to play the male lead Dawson Cole, replacing Walker for the role after his death, respectively. On January 28, Liana Liberato joined the film's cast as the younger version of Monaghan's character, Amanda Collier. On February 12, Luke Bracey was added to the cast to play the younger version of Marsden's character, Dawson Cole. On March 12, Sebastian Arcelus and Gerald McRaney joined the cast of the film. Arcelus played Frank Reynolds, Amanda's husband and father of her children, while McRaney played Tuck, a widower who takes in young Dawson and becomes a friend and father-figure to him. On March 25, Jon Tenney was added to the cast to play Harvey Collier, the father of Amanda.

=== Filming ===
Principal photography began on March 6, 2014 in New Orleans, Louisiana for a 42-day shoot. On April 30 and May 1 the filming took place in the downtown Covington area. Also filming took place in parts of Pearl River, Louisiana.

=== Post-production ===
On June 27, 2014, it was announced that composer Aaron Zigman would be scoring the music for the film.

== Soundtrack ==
The Best of Me: Original Motion Picture Soundtrack

Soundtrack album by Various Artists
- Released: October 7, 2014
- Genres: Country, pop
- Labels: EMI Nashville, Relativity

Singles from The Best of Me: Original Motion Picture Soundtrack
- 1. "I Did with You" Released: September 8, 2014

The soundtrack album for the film, released on October 7, 2014, features original music primarily from the genre of country music, recorded by artists such as Lady Antebellum, Hunter Hayes, David Nail, Colbie Caillat, Kip Moore, Eli Young Band, Eric Paslay, Thompson Square, and Thomas Rhett. "I Did with You" by Lady Antebellum was released on September 8, 2014 as the first promotional single from the soundtrack. The band's other contribution, "Falling for You" is also available on the deluxe edition of their fifth studio album, 747.

The titles and performing artists were published by Taste of Country.

No.	Title	Performer(s)	Length
1.	"I Did with You"	Lady Antebellum	3:15
2.	"Dream Girl"	Hunter Hayes	3:39
3.	"Hold On"	SHEL and Gareth Dunlop	3:26
4.	"In Love Again"	Colbie Caillat	3:31
5.	"The Way Things Go"	Thomas Rhett	4:06
6.	"Borrowed Time"	Thompson Square	4:12
7.	"Lead Me"	Kip Moore	3:50
8.	"Love Is a Liar"	Kacey Musgraves	3:15
9.	"Falling for You"	Lady Antebellum	3:54
10.	"Rain from Heaven"	Eric Paslay	3:58
11.	"All the Way"	David Nail	2:56
12.	"Unchanged"	Eli Young Band	3:35
13.	"Sweet Jane"	Cowboy Junkies	3:27
14.	"Crossroads"	Phoebe Hoffman	4:48

=== Commercial performance ===
The album debuted at number 54 on the Billboard 200, selling 6,200 copies in its first week.

=== Chart performance ===
Chart (2014–15)	Peak position
US Billboard 200	52
US Top Country Albums (Billboard)	11
US Top Soundtracks (Billboard)	4

== Reception ==
=== Box office ===
The Best of Me opened in North America on October 17, 2014 across 2,936 theaters. It has grossed $26.8 million in North America and $14.3 million in other territories for a worldwide total of $41.1 million.

In its opening weekend, the film grossed $10 million finishing fifth at the box office behind Fury, Gone Girl, The Book of Life and Alexander and the Terrible, Horrible, No Good, Very Bad Day, making it the worst opening for a Nicholas Sparks' novel adaptation.

=== Critical reception ===
The Best of Me was panned by critics. As of June 2020, the film scored a 12% approval rating on Rotten Tomatoes, based on 82 reviews with an average rating of 3.64 out of 10. The site's consensus read, "At nine films and counting, the line between Nicholas Sparks film fans and detractors is clear, and The Best of Me will change few minds on either side of the divide." On Metacritic, the film scored 29 out of 100, based on 26 critics, indicating "generally unfavorable reviews". In CinemaScore polls conducted during the opening weekend, cinema audiences gave The Best of Me an average grade of "B+" on an A+ to F scale.

== Home media ==
The Best of Me was released on DVD and Blu-ray on February 3, 2015. At the same time, a "Tears of Joy" edition of the film with a running time of 115 minutes and an alternate ending was released on DVD and Blu-ray.
