= Bashful Brother Oswald =

American musician

Background information
- Also known as: Pete Kirby
- Born: Beecher Ray Kirby; December 26, 1911; Sevier County, Tennessee United States
- Died: October 17, 2002 (aged 90) Madison, Tennessee
- Genres: country, old-time music
- Occupation(s): sideman, session musician, solo artist
- Instrument(s): resonator guitar, Dobro, steel guitar, banjo, guitar, vocals
- Years active: 1930s–1990s
- Labels: Starday, Rounder

Beecher Ray "Pete" Kirby (December 26, 1911 – October 17, 2002), better known as Bashful Brother Oswald, was an American country musician who popularized the use of the resonator guitar and Dobro. He played with Roy Acuff's Smoky Mountain Boys and was a member of the Grand Ole Opry.

Though he released only a few recordings as a solo artist, he played as a session musician on numerous records, including the Nitty Gritty Dirt Band's 1972 album Will the Circle be Unbroken.

== Biography ==
=== Early years ===
Beecher Ray Kirby was born in rural Sevier County, Tennessee in the Great Smoky Mountains. His father, G. W. Kirby, was an Appalachian folk musician who played fiddle and banjo. As a child, Kirby learned to play guitar and banjo and sang gospel music. By his teens, he was playing for square dances.

In the late 1920s, Kirby followed the path of many people from the Appalachian region and moved to the northern United States to find work. He went to Flint, Michigan and worked on the Buick assembly line. He lost his job, though, in the economic downturn of the Great Depression in the 1930s.

Kirby then returned to music, playing at informal square dance parties held in the homes of other transplanted southerners. It was at one such party that Kirby met a Hawaiian guitarist named Rudy Waikiki.

"That was when I first heard someone play something like my style. He was a real Hawaiian boy, from over in the islands, and he was playing this way and I loved it. I'd go to them parties just to watch him play," Kirby said. "Then I'd go home and get my guitar and try to do the same thing. I was just playing a straight guitar and I had to raise the strings up, put a nut under the strings."

With the music of Hawaii, played by Sol Hoʻopiʻi and other performers, gaining in popularity, Kirby bought his first resonator guitar, an early National model, and joined in the trend, playing in bars, cafes and beer gardens. He visited the Chicago World's Fair in 1933, playing in clubs and gaining a following. Some of the clubs he played in were owned by Al Capone.

=== Return to Tennessee ===
In a bid to find more steady work, Kirby moved to Knoxville, Tennessee in 1934. Taking the stage name Pete Kirby, he played resonator guitar with local bands, among them Roy Acuff's Crazy Tennesseans, later to become the Smoky Mountain Boys. Acuff joined the Grand Ole Opry in 1938, and Kirby joined the Opry with Acuff's band on New Year's Day 1939.

It was with the Acuff band that Kirby became introduced as Bashful Brother Oswald, with Kirby posing as the brother of the band's banjoist, Rachel Veach ("Queen of the Hills"), so that it would appear to audiences that the unmarried Veach was being chaperoned by a family member. To fit his new persona, Kirby created the clownish Oswald character, wearing a floppy, wide-brimmed hat, tattered bib overalls, oversized work shoes and adopting a braying laugh.

Featured on the nationwide broadcasts of the Opry, Oswald created a sensation playing his resonator guitar on such songs as "Old Age Pension Check". The instrument, developed in the late 1920s, was still relatively new. Oswald and the Acuff band were featured in a Hollywood film, Grand Ole Opry for Republic Pictures, which gave the instrument even greater exposure. "People couldn't understand how I played it and what it was, and they'd always want to come around and look at it."

In addition to his guitar and banjo playing, Oswald was a vocalist, and his tenor voice can be heard on Acuff's hit songs, "Precious Jewel" and "Wreck on the Highway".

=== Later years ===
Oswald began his career as a solo artist and session musician in the 1960s.

He released his self-titled debut album in 1962 on Starday Records. He joined the Rounder Records label in the 1970s, releasing around a half dozen albums over the years until his last recording, Carry Me Back, in 1999.

His session work included working with the Nitty Gritty Dirt Band on Will the Circle Be Unbroken, an album that paid tribute to the old-time, traditional country musicians of Nashville, Tennessee, Roy Acuff, Maybelle Carter, Earl Scruggs, Merle Travis, Doc Watson and others. Bill Monroe declined to participate. Solo tracks by Kirby on Circle include "The End of the World" and his own composition, "Sailin' to Hawaii". Oswald was also present for the Nitty Gritty Dirt Band's follow-up album, Will the Circle Be Unbroken: Volume Two in 1989, singing backing vocals on the title track.

Oswald was the sole member of the 1939 Smoky Mountain Boys that still accompanied Acuff at the time of Acuff's death in 1992. With former Smoky Mountain Boys bandmate Charlie Collins, Oswald formed the musical comedy duo "Os and Charlie", which was a fixture at the Opryland theme park and on the Grand Ole Opry.

He participated in 1994's The Great Dobro Sessions album, featured alongside such other resonator guitarists as Mike Auldridge, Jerry Douglas, Josh Graves, Rob Ickes, Tut Taylor and Gene Wooten.

Gibson Guitar Corporation, owner of the Dobro brand of resonator guitars, created a "Brother Oswald" signature series Dobro in 1995. The model has since been retired.

Oswald died on October 17, 2002, at his home in Madison, Tennessee, at the age of 90.
