= Original Traditional =

Studio album by Blue Highway
- Released: 2016
- Studio: Hat Creek Recording Company, Jonesborough, TN
- Genre: Bluegrass
- Length: 37:53
- Label: Decca / Rounder
- Producer: Blue Highway

Blue Highway chronology
| The Game (2014) | Original Traditional (2016) |

Original Traditional is an album by Blue Highway. It earned the group a Grammy Award nomination for Best Bluegrass Album.

== Track listing ==
| No. | Title | Writer(s) | Length |
|---|---|---|---|
| 1. | "Don't Weep for Me" | Buddy Brock, Gerald Ellenburg, Shawn Lane | 3:29 |
| 2. | "If Lonesome Don't Kill Me" | Bobby Starnes, Tim Stafford | 2:18 |
| 3. | "Water From the Stone" (Kim Williams, Larry Shell, Wayne Taylor) | | 3:38 |
| 4. | "Last Time I'll Ever Leave This Town" | Jon Weisberger, Tim Stafford | 2:39 |
| 5. | "Alexander's Run" | Jason Burleson | 2:23 |
| 6. | "Hallelujah" | public domain | 3:34 |
| 7. | "What You Wanted" | Gerald Ellenburg, Shawn Lane | 2:49 |
| 8. | "The Story of my Life" | Wayne Taylor | 2:43 |
| 9. | "Wilkes County Clay" | Bobby Starnes, Tim Stafford | 3:57 |
| 10. | "A Long Row to Hoe" | Shawn Lane | 3:07 |
| 11. | "She Ain't Worth It" | Steve Gulley, Tim Stafford | 3:27 |
| 12. | "Top of the Ridge" | Gerald Ellenburg, Shawn Lane | 3:49 |

== Personnel ==
Blue Highway

- Jason Burleson - banjo
- Gaven Largent - resonator guitar
- Shawn Lane - fiddle, mandolin
- Tim Stafford - guitar
- Wayne Taylor - bass

Guest

- Chad Lane - vocals on "Top of the Ridge

Production

- Jim Price - engineer
- Bobby Starnes - assistant engineer
- Scott Vestal - mixing
- Paul Blakemore - mastering
