= Celestial Skies =

Studio album by This World
- Released: 13 December 2013
- Recorded: 2013
- Genre: World music, progressive rock, contemporary Christian
- Length: 52:27
- Label: Kohler Music Media
- Producer: Rob Kohler, Lee Kohler

This World chronology
Beyond the Beyond (2000)	Celestial Skies (2013)	Live at the Roundhouse (2013)

Celestial Skies is the third studio album from the band This World. It was released in 2013. It is the first This World album to feature Kate Kohler on background vocals.

== Composition and recording ==
The album is constructed in such a way that the first two tracks are standalone, and then tracks 3–9 make up the Celestial Skies Suite. The Suite plays through continuously, typical of progressive rock concept albums. The lyrics of the suite reflect on a variety of themes, such as the passage of time ("Dali's Music Box," "Reprise"), the role of God in our lives ("Aurora Borealis," "Solar Sea"), and the nature of the universe ("Transmission"). The lyrics for the non-Suite songs reflect on love ("Be Love Today"), racism and intolerance ("Brave Heart"), and endurance in the face of emotional struggle ("Don't Look Away"). Every song on the album has music and lyrics by Lee Kohler, with the exception of "Transmission" with a rap performed Lee's son Matthew John Kohler, and the instrumental finale, "When We Were Young," composed by Rob Kohler. However, as with all of This World's work, many of the songs were created in collaboration between band members.

The album was recorded in Destin, Florida, New Orleans, Louisiana, and Los Angeles, California over a period of several years. After veteran This World drummer Clay Green was unavailable to perform on this album, Lee and Rob travelled to Denver, Colorado to record with their childhood friend, Mark Raynes.

== Track listing ==
No.	Title	Writer(s)	Length
1.	"Be Love Today" (featuring Anna Kohler)	Lee Kohler	5:37
2.	"Brave Heart"	Lee Kohler	6:04

Celestial Skies Suite
No.	Title	Writer(s)	Length
3.	"Deepest Darkest Depth"	Lee Kohler	1:54
4.	"Celestial Skies"	Lee Kohler	4:40
5.	"Aurora Borealis" (featuring Sam Kohler)	Lee Kohler, Rob Kohler	7:17
6.	"Dali's Music Box"	Lee Kohler	2:14
7.	"Transmission" (featuring Matthew Kohler)	Lee Kohler (music); Matthew Kohler (lyrics)	4:07
8.	"Solar Sea"	Lee Kohler	4:43
9.	"Reprise"	Lee Kohler	5:00

No.	Title	Writer(s)	Length
10.	"Don't Look Away"	Lee Kohler	6:48
11.	"When We Were Young"	Rob Kohler	4:38
Total length:			52:27

== Personnel ==
=== This World ===
- Lee Kohler – Multi-Keyboards, Rhythm Guitar, Lead Vocals
- Rob Kohler – Basses, Lead Guitar
- Mark Raynes – Drums Percussion
- Kate Kohler – Background Vocals

=== Special Guests ===
- Matthew Kohler – Vocal on "Transmission"
- Anna Kohler – Vocal on "Be Love Today"
- Sam Kohler – Cello on "Aurora Borealis"

== Release ==
The album was released on December 29, 2013. Excerpts can be heard on the band's SoundCloud page.
