= Lee Kohler =

American musician

- Born: Leonard Read Kohler
- Origin: Great Falls, Montana, United States
- Genres: Jazz, classical
- Occupation: Musician
- Instruments: Piano, organ
- Years active: 1979–present
- Website: www.kohlermusic.com

Lee Kohler (born June 22, 1961) is an American pianist, composer, and vocalist, best known as being the leader of the band This World.

== Early life and education ==
Kohler was raised in Great Falls, Montana, United States, along with his siblings Rob, Kate, and Ken Kohler. His father, John Kohler, was a music educator and saxophonist, and his mother Marjorie is a church organist. Kohler attended Montana State University in Bozeman, studying piano with Leslie Jones and Henry Campbell. Kohler toured the United States in 1980 with the band Phoenix Express, then known as Nova. The band opened for acts such as Rita Coolidge, Three Dog Night, and Gary Puckett & The Union Gap.

== In Flight (1983-90) ==
In 1983, Kohler founded the band In Flight with guitarist Robi Johns. Kohler's brother Rob joined the band in 1985. The group then consisted of Lee Kohler on keyboards, Rob Kohler on bass, and Robi Johns on guitar. The group composed all of their own music, which was a mix of classical, jazz, and new age styles. They travelled to Seattle in 1986 to record their first album at the Music Source, where Nirvana would later record parts of "Smells Like Teen Spirit" in 1991. The album, entitled "...Imagine a Music" was self-released on cassette. After increasing press attention and critical acclaim, the trio was invited to perform at the Montreux Jazz Festival in 1989. They performed three times at the festival in July 1989, for audiences of more than 70,000 each. The group disbanded in 1990.

== Return as This World (1995-present) ==
In 1995, Lee and Rob Kohler formed another trio with drummer Michael Blessing, called This World. The band saw Lee Kohler shift from acoustic piano to a focus on synthesizers and singing, and the addition of percussion added a new dimension to the new band's sound. The group recorded an eponymous album with veteran producer Cookie Marenco during the summer of 1995. After Blessing left the group, he was replaced by drummer Clay Green, who appears on the band's second album Beyond the Beyond. After 13 years, the band reformed again with drummer Mark Raynes to record their third album, Celestial Skies.

== Musical style ==
Kohler's compositional style is heavily influenced by Yes, Pink Floyd, and traditional church organ music. His lyrics are often calls for peace and spiritual harmony. Kohler explained in an interview with the Vacaville Reporter that he is "not very interested in what's going on politically, but humanitarianly. What inspires me are mostly world events, and human tragedy."

== Personal life ==
Kohler married Maria Kohler in 1991. The couple has three children; Patricia (b. 1980), Matthew (b. 1990), and Anna (b. 1991). They currently reside in Santa Paula, California where Kohler works as a church organist.

== Compositions ==
Symphonic Works

- Symphonic Works, Db Major (2001)
- Concerto For Piano & Symphony Orchestra (2002)
- Four Works For Christmas, Chamber Orchestra & Choir (Premiered December 6th 2003, Hofman Auditorium, Alameda, CA.)
- Symphonic Works, D Minor "For The Fallen" (2004)
- Symphony No. 1, D Minor (2007)
- Symphony No. 2, Bb Minor (2009)
- Symphony No. 3, C Minor (2022)
- Symphony No. 4, Ab Major (2023)
- Then The Darkness, Then The Light (2024)

=== String Quartet Works ===
- String Quartet, No 1 (Premiered April 24th 1988, Charles Russell Museum of Art, Great Falls, MT.)
- String Quartet, No 2 Bb Minor (2002)
- String Quartet, No 3 C Minor (Premiered March 30th 2014 Saint Paul Lutheran, New Orleans, LA.)

=== Choral Works ===
- Prepare The Way Of The Lord (Premiered August 30th 1998, Central Christian, Great Falls, MT.)
- A Prayer Within (2001)
- Hymn Meditation, Eb Major (2002)
- Epitaphium, "For The Fallen" (2004)
- Ave Maria (Premiered December 24th 2012, Saint Francis Episcopal, Novato, CA)
- ...and from all corners of the earth, peace (2009)
- Seven Last Words Of Christ (2010)
- Psalm 51 (2024)

=== Organ Works ===
- Organ Work, E Major (Sky) (1988) Premiered October 28th 2001 First Church of Christ Scientist, Berkeley CA.
- Organ Work, Db Major (1988) Premiered October 28th 2001 First Church of Christ Scientist, Berkeley CA.
- Organ Work, C Minor (1988) Premiered November 5th 1989 Montana Centennial, First Methodist, Great Falls, MT.
- Organ Work, Gb Major for Organ and Synthesizer (1988) Premiered April 29th 1990, First English Lutheran, Great Falls, MT.
- Organ Work, F Major (1990) Premiered December 30th 1990 AGO Concert, Great Falls, MT.
- Organ Work, D Minor (2001)
- Pastorale on "Beautiful Savior" (2010)
- Prelude on "Hymn To Joy" (2010)
- Twenty-Four Postludes, In All Keys (2010)
- ...and from all corners of the earth, peace (2013) Premiered June 6th, Saint Francis Episcopal, Novato, CA
- Organ Work, Advent Skies (2025) Premiered November 30th 2025 AGO Concert, First Presbyterian, Oxnard CA.

=== Piano Works ===
- Piano Work, F Major (1990) Premiered December 30th 1990 AGO Concert, Great Falls, MT.
- Piano Work, A Minor (2002)
- Piano Work, C Minor (2002)
- Piano Work, Andante Rubato (2002)
- Piano Work, Presto (2002)
- Piano Work, Agitato (2002)
- Pinocchio Suite For Piano (2002)
- Piano Work, G Minor (2010)
- Piano Work, E Major Opus 2 (2010)
- Piano Work, C Minor-The Bird (2014) Premiered May 24th 2014 Saint Francis Episcopal, Novato, CA.

=== Song Works ===
- This World (1996-First Album) All Life, All Is Revealed, Fire Or Light, Signs Above, This World Suite, The River
- Beyond The Beyond (2000 Second Album) Beyond The Beyond, Let It Out
- Celestial Skies (2013 Third Album) Be Love Today, Don't Look Away, Celestial Skies Suite- Deepest, Darkest, Depth, Celestial Skies, Aurora Borealis, Dali's Clock, Transmission, Solar Seas, Reprise-On And On
- Intentional FeedBack (2018 Forth Album) Badlands (New Beginning), Seasons, Have You Seen It?, All Things Made New, I Believe In This Dream, Sacred Songs And Other Earthly Things, Intentional FeedBack

=== Jazz Works ===
- Mentor (1994)
- No Changes (1994)
- And I Need You Too (2019)
- Jazz At Six (2025)
- Minor Rain (2025)

== Discography ==
=== with This World ===
- ...Imagine a Music (1986, as In Flight)
- Live in Montreux Switzerland (1988, as In Flight-Unpublished)
- This World (1996)
- Beyond the Beyond (2000)
- Celestial Skies (2013)
- Intentional FeedBack (2018)

=== Solo ===
- Organ and Piano Works I (1989)
- Organ Works II (2000)
- Organ Works III (2006)
- Organ Works IV (2009)
- Piano Works "Hymn Meditation" (1996)
- Piano Works (2014)

=== with Kohler Jazz Trio ===
- M&M Blues (1990)
- Blues and Things (1996)
- Love Songs (2001)

=== As sideman ===
- Harmony and Bells (2007, with the Kohler Green Project)
- Winter Colors (2019 with the Peterson Kohler Collective, Origin Records)
