= Trey Hensley =

US singer/songwriter

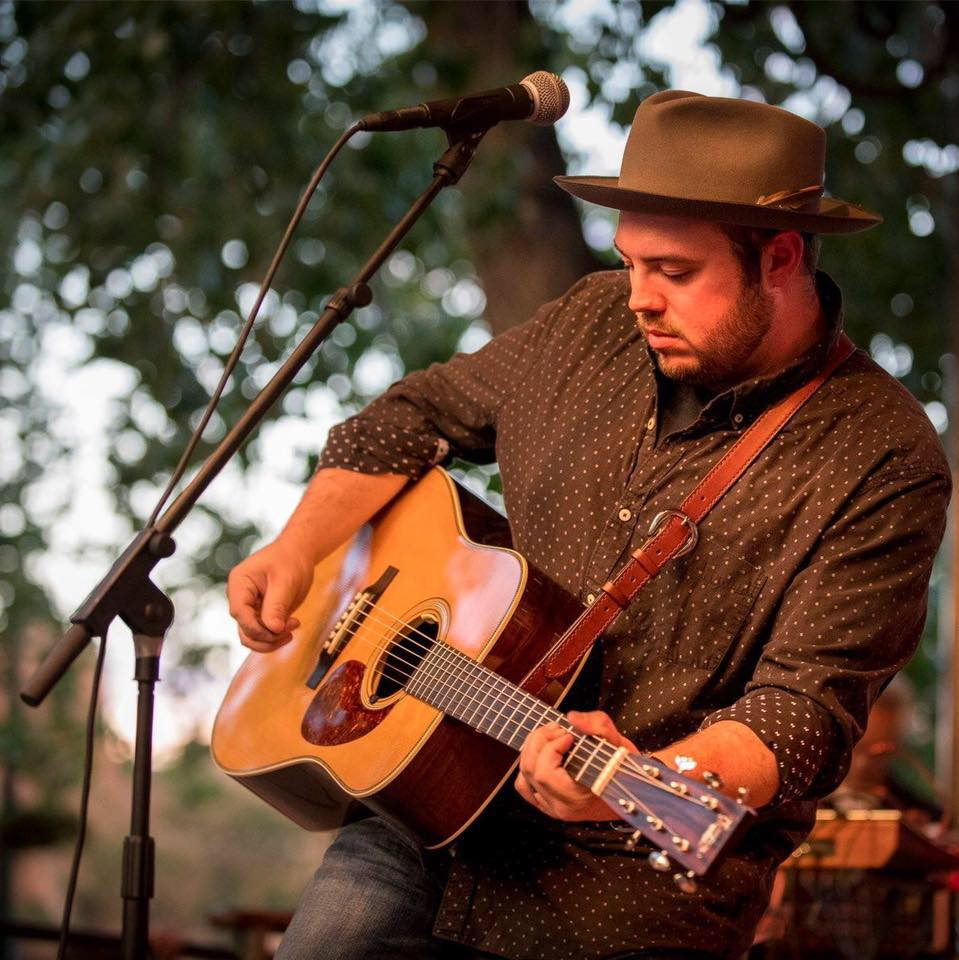

Background information
- Born: September 27, 1990 (age 35); Johnson City, Tennessee
- Genres: Bluegrass, Country, Americana
- Occupation: Musician
- Instruments: Guitar, Vocals, Mandolin
- Label: Compass Records
- Website: https://treyhensley.com/

Trey Aaron Hensley (born 1990) is an American singer-songwriter and guitarist. Hensley made his first public appearance on the Grand Ole Opry at age 11 with Marty Stuart and Earl Scruggs. Hensley moved to Nashville in 2013 and formed a duo with dobro player Rob Ickes. Hensley and Ickes released the GRAMMY-nominated album Before the Sun Goes Down (2015) on Compass Records label, The Country Blues (2016), and World Full of Blues (2019).

== Early career ==
Trey Hensley was born in Johnson City, Tennessee, and grew up in Telford, Tennessee where he started out singing in a gospel group at 6 years old. His interest in bluegrass guitar developed after hearing Charlie Waller and Jimmy Martin perform at a festival several years later.

Just a few months after Hensley learned to play the guitar (11 years old), he was invited to perform Jimmy Brown the Newsboy on the Grand Ole Opry with Marty Stuart and Earl Scruggs. Not long after his Opry debut, Hensley met Johnny Cash and June Carter Cash at the Carter Family Fold in Hiltons, VA where he performed with Johnny Cash and other members of the Carter Family. Hensley also performed at June Carter Cash's birthday party in June 2002. Johnny Cash introduced Hensley to Tom T. Hall who produced his first bluegrass album in 2003 titled First Time Out.

Other bluegrass albums that Hensley recorded and produced with his bluegrass band Drivin' Force include Backin' to Birmingham on Copper Creek Records (October 19, 2004), Third Time Out and Songs of Faith on Hog Holler Records. Over the years Trey Hensley has performed with and opened shows for many artists such as Charlie Daniels, Steve Wariner, The Oak Ridge Boys, Ricky Skaggs, Blue Highway, J.D. Crowe, Marty Stuart, Earl Scruggs, Peter Frampton, Randy Owen, Sara Evans and many others. In 2008, Hensley performed at the President's Dinner at the White House for George W. Bush and a private event for wounded soldiers at the vice president's (Dick Cheney) residence along with Charlie Daniels.

== Recordings ==
=== World Full of Blues (2019) ===
World Full of Blues is the third album released by Trey Hensley and duo partner, Rob Ickes. This album showcases a myriad of Hensley's influences from bluegrass and Americana to the blues. The album was produced by GRAMMY-winning producer Brent Maher and released on Compass Records label on October 4, 2019. The album features guest artists including Vince Gill on the Grateful Dead's Brown-Eyed Women, and Taj Mahal on the original title track World Full of Blues. This album was also recorded live in the studio like Hensley's other projects, at the Blueroom in Nashville, Tennessee with minimal over-dubs.

=== The Country Blues (2016) ===
The Country Blues is the second album released by Hensley and Rob Ickes. This album was co-produced by Hensley and recorded live at Compass Records with minimal over-dubs. In addition to Hensley and Ickes, The Country Blues featured guest vocals from Vince Gill, Carl Jackson, John Randall Stewart, Robinella, and Shawn Lane and musicians including Mike Bub, John Alvey, and Ron Block.

=== Before the Sun Goes Down (2015) ===
Before the Sun Goes Down was the debut album released by Trey Hensley and Rob Ickes on Compass Records. This album was co-produced by Hensley and recorded live at Compass Records with minimal over-dubs. The album featured artists including Ron Block, Mike Bub, Susanne Cox, John Gardner, Aubrey Haynie, Shawn Lane, Andy Leftwich, John Randall Stewart, Dan Tyminski, and Pete Wasner. Before the Sun Goes Down was nominated in 2016 for a GRAMMY Award for Best Bluegrass Album.

=== It Is What It Is (2009) ===
It Is What It Is was Trey Hensley's sophomore Country album self-released by Kid In the Hat, LLC on November 1, 2009. This album featured musical guests including Janie Fricke, Steve Wariner, Terry Wariner, and Duane Allen, Joe Bonsall and Richard Sterban of the Oak Ridge Boys.

=== Looking at My Future (2008) ===
Looking at My Future was Trey Hensley's debut Country album. The album was self-released by Kid In the Hat, LLC on November 24, 2008.

== Awards and nominations ==
| Year | Association | Category | Nominated work | Results |
|---|---|---|---|---|
| 2023 | IBMA Awards | Guitar Player of the Year | Trey Hensley | Won |
| 2020 | IBMA Awards | Guitar Player of the Year | Trey Hensley | Lost |
| 2017 | IBMA Awards | Recorded Event of the Year | I've Gotta Get a Message to You (2017) Bobby Osborne with Sierra Hull, Alison Brown, Rob Ickes, Stuart Duncan, Trey Hensley, Todd Phillips, Kenny Malone, Claire Lynch, and Bryan McDowell (artists), Original (album), Alison Brown (producer), Compass Records (label) | Won |
| 2016 | IBMA Awards | Instrumental Recorded Performance of the Year | Fireball (2016) Special Consensus featuring Rob Ickes, Trey Hensley, and Alison Brown (artists), Long I Ride (album), Compass Records | Won |
| 2016 | GRAMMY Awards | Best Bluegrass Album | Before The Sun Goes Down (2015) | Nominated |
