= Jenna Mammina =

American singer

- Born: 20 September 1964 (age 61); St. Joseph, Michigan, U.S.
- Genres: Jazz, pop, Americana
- Occupation: Shoo Bop Enthusiast
- Label: Mamma Grace
- Website: jennamammina.com

Jenna Mammina is a jazz and pop singer (vocal stylist) from Michigan.

== Biography ==
Mammina was born in St. Joseph, Michigan, and began singing in church from the age of five and performing in school musicals. In her teens, Mammina learned to play piano and guitar, performing with local bands. She attended Central Michigan University, Michigan State University, and Laney College in Oakland, before settling in San Francisco.

After session work with The Spinners and Narada Michael Walden, Mammina has gone on to record five albums, all released on her own label, Mamma Grace. Mammina, who performs as many as 250 times a year, has performed with Bobby McFerrin, Bobby Watson, Nancy King, Andy Narell, and Steve Coleman. Derk Richardson, writing for the San Francisco Chronicle, picked her debut album, Under the Influence, as number nine in his top albums of 1999. Her second album, Meant to Be, was nominated for a California Music Award in the Outstanding Jazz Album category.

Mammina is also a music educator, presenting workshops titled "Scat for Cats" and "So You Want to Be a Rock and Roll Star'" in schools and universities.

== Musical style ==
Mammina combines folk music, pop, and jazz, often performing with guitarist Andre Bush. She covers a wide range of music, including songs ranging from Abbey Lincoln (her idol) to Elvis Costello, U2, and Tom Waits, as well as original compositions. Her voice has been described as "sweet and flexible", "whisper-like" with "air-brushed phrasings and silky nuance", and less flatteringly, as "tiny, thinnish, high-pitched".

Mammina says of her style:

"I don't want to categorize the music. It's not that I don't know who I am. I don't sing classical, and I'm not a soul singer, or an R&B singer, but I have been influenced by that stuff too. I can sing a Patsy Cline tune, a James Taylor tune, or a Led Zeppelin tune, but I do it with my own flair."

== Discography ==
- Under the Influence (Mamma Grace, 1999)
- Just a Little Bit (Mamma Grace, 2000)
- Meant to Be (Mamma Grace, 2002)
- Art of the Duo with Andre Bush (2003)
- Inner Smile (Mamma Grace, 2005)
- Live at the Acorn Theater (Mamma Grace, 2007)
- Yule Tunes (Mamma Grace, 2011)
- The Music & the Magic of Ms. Abbey Lincoln (Mamma Grace, 2013)
- Spark with Rolf Sturm (Water Street Music, 2015)
- Begin to Dance with Rolf Sturm (Water Street Music, 2017)
- Everyone I Love is Here Jenna and the Charmers (Mamma Grace, 2019)
