= Gene Wooten =

American musician

Gene Wooten (June 5, 1953 in Franklinton, North Carolina – November 7, 2001 in Nashville, Tennessee) was an American dobro player and multi-instrumentalist.

== Biography ==
Wooten became serious about playing music professionally while a student at Appalachian State University in Boone, North Carolina, and ultimately moved to Nashville in 1977, where he found his first professional job as a musician with Wilma Lee Cooper. He quickly became a regular on the Grand Ole Opry. His work as a dobro player took him on the road and in the studio with numerous well-known Bluegrass stars including the Osborne Brothers and Del and Ronnie McCoury. In 1994, he shared a Grammy Award with Jerry Douglas, Josh Graves, Rob Ickes and others for his work on the all-star[dobro album called The Great Dobro Sessions. He was also known as a member of the Country Gazette, and the Sidemen which was the house band of musicians at the famous Station Inn in Nashville, a coveted position he held for more than ten years. For three years, he was named dobro player of the year by the Society for the Preservation of Bluegrass in America. He recorded one solo album. Late in his career he was best known for playing on Patty Loveless' award-winning acoustic album, Mountain Soul.

Wooten’s craftsmanship with wooden instruments of all kinds impressed his peers. He worked for various musical instrument manufacturers, repairing instruments for some of the most famous Bluegrass musicians. He was especially appreciated for his ability to work on the dobro.
