= Bob Stoloff =

American jazz musician (born 1952)

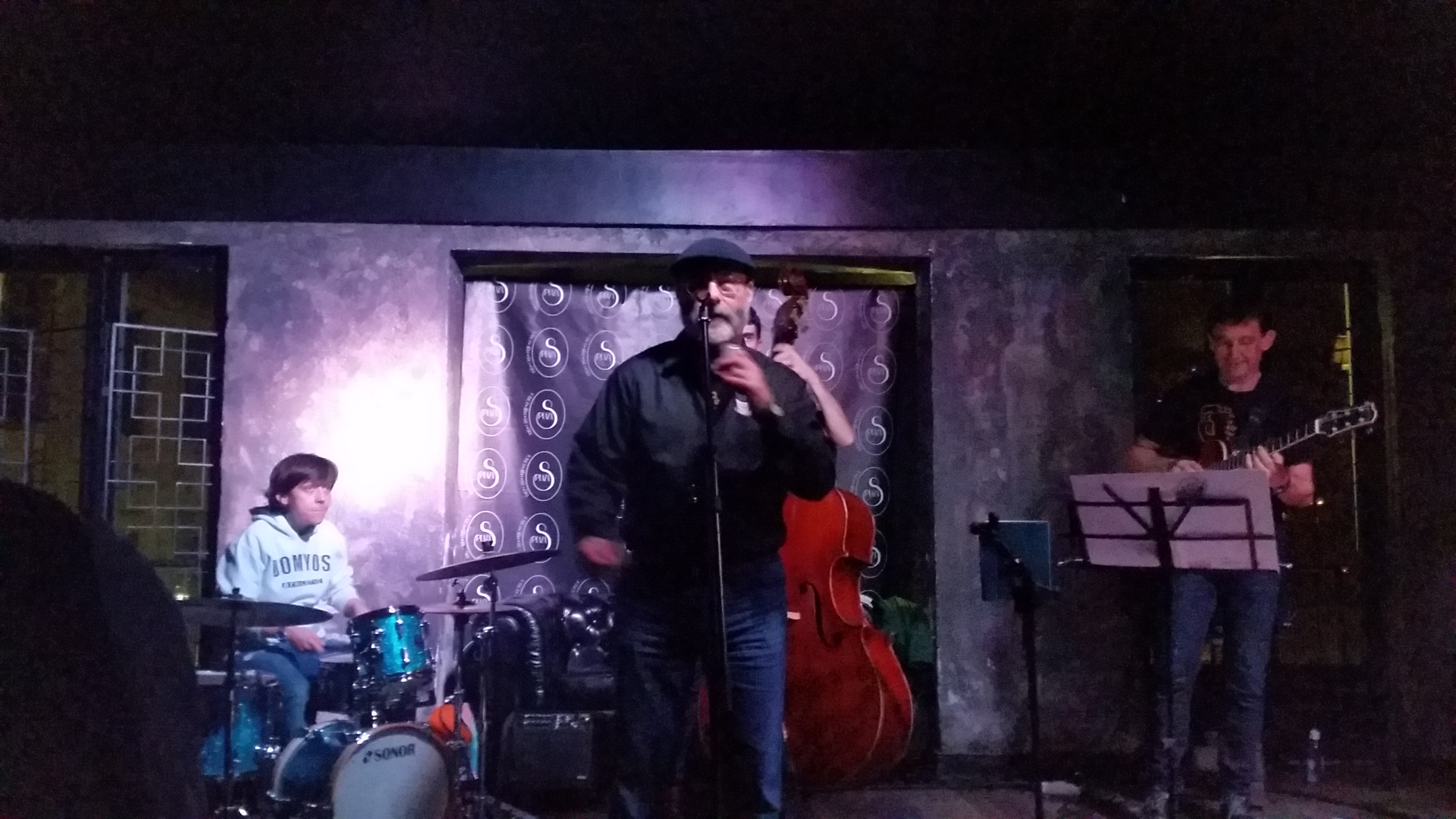
- Performing in Spain

Background information
- Born: August 20, 1952 (age 73); New York City, United States
- Genres: Jazz; vocal; scat
- Occupations: Musician, songwriter, conductor, teacher
- Instruments: Vocals; Trumpet; Piano; vocal percussion
- Website: www.bobstoloffmusic.com

Bob Stoloff (born 20 August 1952 in New York) is an American jazz musician (vocals, drums first, composition) and teacher.

== Early life and education ==
Stoloff, who grew up first in Port Washington, as a teenager played numerous instruments and from 1967 to 1969, the High School of Music & Art in New York City graduated, then worked as a musician. He studied 1974-1976 at the Berklee College of Music percussion, also began at this time but to sing. In the next few years he worked as a studio musician and played as drummer sideman on numerous albums.

== Career ==
In 1983 he was appointed to the Berklee College, where he taught scat. In 1984, he was (at the time Urszula Dudziak, Jay Clayton, Jeanne Lee and partially Bobby McFerrin included) with the Vocal Summit tour in Europe. In addition, he has also performed with Joey Blake and Bobby McFerrin.

He presented a number of textbooks on jazz singing and teaching continues as Associate Professor at Berklee College, where he was deputy head of the Voice Department. In addition, he also directed the vocal training at the Universidad San Francisco de Quito in Ecuador. He can be heard on recordings with the Jazz Harp Trio and the Boston group The Ritz.

=== Bob Stoloff Vocal Jazz Academies ===
Along the years he has opened several vocal jazz academies in different parts of the world: in Rome, Italy, in Rotterdam, Netherlands, and in Avilés, Spain.

== Publications ==
- Scat! Vocal Improvisation Techniques (Gerard/Sarzin; mit CD)
- Blues Scatitudes (Gerard/Sarzin)
- Body Beats (Advance Music)
- Vocal Improvisation: An Instru-Vocal Approach for Soloists, Groups, and Choirs (Hal Leonard/Berklee Press)
- Rhythmania! (CD)
- Recipes for Soloing over Jazz Standards Vol. 1
