= Jay Clayton (musician) =

American jazz musician (1941–2023)

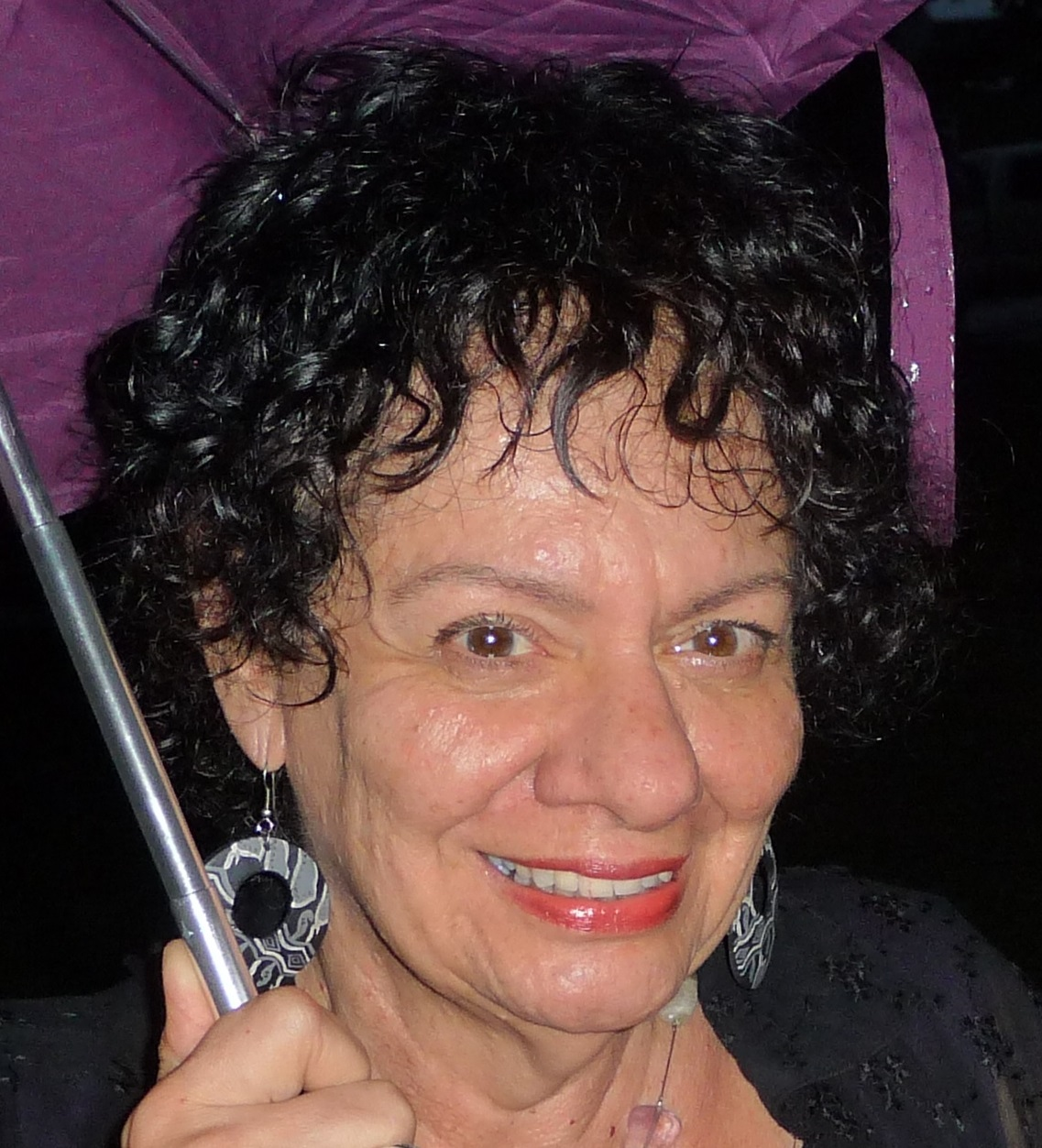

Background information
- Born: Judith Theresa Colantone; October 28, 1941; Youngstown, Ohio, U.S.
- Died: December 31, 2023 (aged 82) New Paltz, New York, U.S.
- Genres: Jazz, avant-garde jazz
- Instruments: Vocals

Judith Theresa Colantone (October 28, 1941 – December 31, 2023), known as Jay Clayton, was an American avant-garde jazz vocalist and educator.

== Early life and education ==
Judith Theresa Colantone was born in Youngstown, Ohio, in 1941. From a young age, Clayton would pick up different jazz standards, and eventually learned to play the accordion. As she grew, she picked up piano and received lessons for a number of years. After graduating high school, Clayton spent the following summer at the St. Louis Institute of Music, a formerly accredited music college in Missouri. First in her family to enroll in college, Clayton attended Miami University in Oxford, Ohio. Due to the fact that classical music was the only genre of vocal training offered by Miami University at that time, Clayton studied classical music, though often listened to jazz records and attended jazz performances in her free time. Clayton graduated with a degree in music education in 1963, then moved to New York City.

== Career ==
After moving to New York, Clayton supported herself with office work by day, but by night, she would explore the blossoming avant-garde jazz scene of the city. Clayton fostered a connection of mentorship with Steve Lacy. Lacy not only helped Clayton find balance between the influence of tradition and free music in her own vocal technique, but also introduced her to bassist Lewis Worrell, trumpeter Marc Levin, and drummer, as well as future husband, Frank Clayton.

Clayton became part of the free jazz and avant-garde jazz crowd, which was unusual for a vocalist. With her status as an established avant-garde musician, she gained many connections. In 1967, Clayton and her husband, Frank Clayton, began presenting a loft jazz concert series in their home including artists, Joanne Brackeen, Cecil McBee, Jane Getz, and Sam Rivers, to name a few. As Clayton gained more and more recognition, she began to perform with other famous avant-garde jazz and minimalist musicians. Musicians she has worked with include: Muhal Richard Abrams, Gary Bartz, Jane Ira Bloom, George Cables, Steve Lacy, Julian Priester, Perry Robinson, Mark Whitecage, Steve Reich, John Cage, Kirk Nurock, Paul McCandless, Bennie Wallace, Dave Holland, Stanley Cowell, and Rufus Reid.

As an independent artist already used to creating her own events, Clayton acted as the artistic director for the first ever Women in Jazz Festival, produced by Cobi Narita in 1979. She served as a consultant for ABC Cable’s Women in Jazz, compiling footage for the series. The year 1980 saw the release of All Out, her first album as a leader, featuring Jane Ira Bloom, Harvie Swartz, Larry Karush, and Frank Clayton.

Clayton's teaching career lifted off in 1982, when she left New York City to build the vocal jazz program at the Cornish College of the Arts. She was on the jazz faculty at Cornish College for the Arts for 20 years. Jay has taught numerous master classes and workshops at places including City College of New York, University of Music and Performing Arts Vienna, and the Bud Shank Jazz Workshop, Banff Centre (which she co-taught with fellow vocalist Sheila Jordan), The New School, the Vermont Jazz Workshop, and Princeton University.

== Death ==
Clayton died from small-cell lung cancer at her home in New Paltz, New York, on December 31, 2023, at the age of 82.

== Discography ==
- All-Out (Anima, 1981)
- Sound Songs with Jerry Granelli (JMT, 1986)
- String Trio of New York & Jay Clayton (West Wind, 1988)
- As Tears Go By with John Lindberg (ITM, 1988)
- Live at Jazz Alley (ITM, 1991)
- The Jazz Alley Tapes with Don Lanphere (Hep, 1992)
- Tito's Acid Trip with Jim Knapp (ITM, 1992)
- Beautiful Love with Fred Hersch (Sunnyside, 1995)
- Mirror with Claudio Fasoli, Stefano Battaglia (RAM, 1996)
- Circle Dancing (Sunnyside, 1997)
- Brooklyn 2000 (Sunnyside, 2001)
- The Peace of Wild Things (Sunnyside, 2008)
- In and Out of Love (Sunnyside, 2010)
- Harry Who?: A Tribute to Harry Warren (Sunnyside, 2013)
- Unraveling Emily with Kirk Nurock (Sunnyside, 2017)
- “Alone Together” with Jerry Granelli (Jay Clayton, 2020)
- 3 For The Road with Fritz Pauer and Ed Neumeister (MeisteroMusic, 2020)

=== As guest ===
With John Cage

- John Cage (Tomato, 1978)
- Three Constructions (Tomato, 1989)
- Four Walls (Tomato, 2003)

With Vocal Summit

- Sorrow Is Not Forever—Love Is (Moers Music, 1983)
- Conference of the Birds (ITM, 1992)

With Muhal Richard Abrams

- Spihumonesty (Black Saint, 1979)

With Charlie Haden

- Helium Tears (Newedition, 2005)

With Claudio Fasoli

- Trois Trios (Splasc(H), 1999)
