= Stanford Jazz Workshop =

Jazz education nonprofit organization

Stanford Jazz Workshop (SJW) is a nonprofit organization dedicated to jazz education and the annual concert series known as the Stanford Jazz Festival.

SJW was founded in 1972 by saxophonist and educator Jim Nadel. Though many of its activities are held on the campus, SJW is neither legally nor financially connected to Stanford University.

== About ==
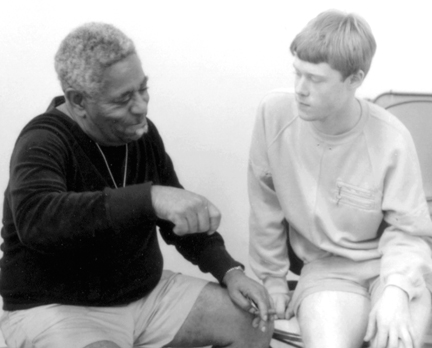
Trumpeter Dizzy Gillespie with drummer Bill Stewart at 1984 Stanford Jazz Workshop

SJW includes a Jazz Camp for musicians ages 12–17; Jazz Institute for adults and advanced youth; and the Evening Summer Program. SJW annually awards more than 100 Jazz Camp tuition scholarships to youth with financial need.

The students and artists who have participated in the Stanford Jazz Workshop and Festival number more than 10,000 and represent countries from around the world.
