= Alice Di Micele =

American singer-songwriter

- Born: Elizabeth, New Jersey
- Genres: Folk
- Occupation: Musician
- Instruments: Guitar, vocals
- Years active: 1980–present
- Label: Alice Otter Music
- Website: alicedimicele.com

Alice Di Micele is an American folk and Americana singer-songwriter known for her environmental and social activism. Active since the late 1980s, she has released several albums and is recognized for her five-octave voice and genre-blending musical style.

== Early life and education ==
Di Micele was born in Elizabeth, New Jersey, in New Jersey, in 1965 and grew up in Linden. Her mother was a pianist and her father was a schoolteacher. She began writing songs as a child and later learned to play the recorder, flute, and guitar. She performed as the lead singer of a local rock/fusion band and sang jazz harmonies in school ensembles. After briefly attending the State University of New York, she moved to Southern Oregon in 1986 at age 21, where she became involved in the region's folk and environmental community.

== Career ==
Di Micele released her debut album, Make a Change, in 1988 and followed it with It’s a Miracle (1989). Her early work established an acoustic-based style influenced by jazz, rock, funk, and blues. During the 1990s, Di Micele toured the West Coast folk circuit and released albums on her independent label, Alice Otter Music, including Too Controversial (1990), Searching (1992), Naked (1994), and Demons & Angels (1998).

In 2000, Di Micele released the live album Alice Live, which documents her concert work from that period. After relocating to Oregon, she became active in environmental movements and performed at protests and grassroots gatherings. In the early 2000s, she took a five-year sabbatical from recording and touring to work as a whitewater river guide in Oregon. She returned with the 2007 album By Ebb & By Flow.

Di Micele continued recording and touring with releases that included Lucky Dogs (2011). In 2013, Di Micele released If I Were an Otter, a children's album focused on ecological themes, followed by Swim (2015) and One With the Tide (2018). In 2019, she recorded Live at Studio E with her band, Force of Nature. After the 2020 Southern Oregon wildfires, she wrote the song "Rise."

In 2022, Di Micele released Every Seed We Plant. In 2024, she released Interpretations, Vol. 1, a covers album honoring artists such as Neil Young and Abbey Lincoln. Her next album, Reverse the Flow, was released on October 10, 2025.

Di Micele is an outspoken LGBTQ+ ally, and themes of her songwriting focus on identity and human rights. Her work has been analyzed to advance music therapy, outdoor education, and ethnomusicology.

== Discography ==
=== Solo recordings ===
- Make a Change (1988)
- It's a Miracle (1989)
- Too Controversial (1990)
- Searching (1992)
- Naked (1994)
- Demons & Angels (1998)
- Alice Live (2000)
- Live at the Strawberry Music Festival (2001)
- RAW, UNFILTERED, ORGANIC (2006)
- by ebb & by flow (2007)
- Lucky Dogs (2011)
- If I Were an Otter: Songs for Kids of All Ages (2013)
- Swim (2015)
- One With the Tide (2018)
- Live at Studio E (2019)
- Every Seed We Plant (2022)
- Interpretations, Vol. 1 (2024)
- Reverse the Flow (2025)

=== Compilations ===
- In the Spirit of Crazy Horse: Songs for Leonard Peltier (1989)
- If A Tree Falls (1994, EarthBeat!)
- Circle of Life (1997)
- One Land One Heart (1998)

=== Collaborations ===
- Petty Thievery
- Circle of Women (1997, Rhino Records)
