= Stacy Phillips =

American musical artist (1944–2018)

- Born: September 29, 1944
- Died: June 5, 2018 (aged 73) Hartford, Connecticut, U.S.
- Genres: Americana, Bluegrass, Klezmer
- Instruments: Dobro, Resonator guitar, Fiddle

Stacy Phillips (born Melvin Marshall; September 29, 1944 – June 5, 2018) was an American Grammy Award winning resophonic guitarist and fiddler, noted for his unusual chord-based resophonic guitar playing. Phillips is also noted for producing a large volume of instructional material for the fiddle and for the resophonic guitar.

== Publications (partial) ==
- Phillips, Stacy (1984). Hot Licks for Bluegrass Fiddle. Oak Publications. ISBN 0825602890.
- Phillips, Stacy; Kosek, Kenny (1992). Bluegrass Fiddle Styles. Music Sales America. ISBN 9780825601859.
- Phillips, Stacy (1992). The Dobro Book. Music Sales America. ISBN 9780825601835.
- Phillips, Stacy (1994). The Phillips Collection of American Fiddle Tunes Vol 1. Mel Bay Publications, Inc. ISBN 9781562225827.
- MacMaster, Natalie; Phillips, Stacy (2001). Mel Bay presents Natalie Macmaster's Cape Breton Island Fiddle. Mel Bay Publications, Inc. ISBN 9780786644735.
