= Blue Highway =

American bluegrass band

- Origin: Kingsport, Tennessee, U.S.
- Genres: Bluegrass, country, southern gospel, folk, Americana
- Years active: 1994–present
- Members: Jason Burleson; Shawn Lane; Tim Stafford; Wayne Taylor; Gary Hultman
- Past members: Rob Ickes; Tom Adams; Gaven Largent; Justin Moses
- Website: bluehighwayband.com

Blue Highway is an American contemporary bluegrass band formed in 1994 and based in Tennessee. The band's albums include Wondrous Love (2003), Marbletown (2005), and Original Traditional (2016).

== Background ==
After helping found the band Dusty Miller, which was the 1990 SPBGMA International Bluegrass Band champion, and being a member (1990–92) of Alison Krauss & Union Station, Kingsport, Tennessee native Tim Stafford helped organize Blue Highway with Wayne Taylor in 1994. The group's first project, It's a Long, Long Road, "spent six months at the top of the Bluegrass Unlimited charts and won IBMA's Album of the Year Award (1996)." Jason Burleson, the original banjo player with the group and a multi-instrumentalist, is a native of Newland, North Carolina., Rob Ickes, a Northern California native, moved to Nashville in 1992 and joined as a founding member in 1994. Ickes has won numerous awards for his playing, and after a 21-year run with the band he announced his departure on November 18, 2015. Ickes was replaced by resonator guitarist and Virginia native, Gaven Largent. Vocalist, fiddler, and mandolin player Shawn Lane joined the group as a founding member after cutting "his musical teeth" in the bands of Ricky Skaggs and Doyle Lawson. Lane's songs have also been recorded by Ricky Skaggs, Ronnie Bowman, Mountain Heart, Blue Ridge, and other groups. Lead singer Wayne Taylor, who plays bass, hails from Southwest Virginia and is also a founding member of the group.

== Awards and honors ==
Grammy nominations

- Best Bluegrass Album (2005): Marbletown
- Best Southern, Country or Bluegrass Gospel Album (2004): Wondrous Love
- Best Bluegrass Album (2016): Original Traditional

International Bluegrass Music Association Awards

- Song of the Year (2008): "Through the Window of a Train"
- Vocal Group of the Year (2012)
- Gospel Recording of the Year (1997): "God Moves in a Windstorm"
- Gospel Recording of the Year (2004): "Wondrous Love"
- Emerging Artist of the Year (1996)
- Album of the Year (1996): It's a Long, Long Road
- Album of the Year Award (2006): Celebration of Life: Musicians Against Childhood Cancer
- Songwriter of the Year (2014, 2017): Tim Stafford
- Dobro Player of the Year (2010, 2009, 2008, 2007, 2006, 2004, 2003, 2000, 1999, 1998, 1997, 1996): Rob Ickes

Society for the Preservation of Bluegrass Music of America Awards

- Gospel Group of the Year (Overall) (2005)
- Instrumental Group of the Year (2003)
- Dobro Performer of the Year (2003): Rob Ickes
- Bass Performer of the Year (2001): Wayne Taylor
- Guitar Performer of the Year (2001, 2015): Tim Stafford

Dove Award

- Best Bluegrass Album (2004): Wondrous Love

== Personnel ==
=== Current members ===
- Jason Burleson – banjo, guitar, mandolin
- Shawn Lane – mandolin, fiddle, guitar, vocals
- Tim Stafford – guitar, vocals
- Wayne Taylor – bass, vocals
- Gary Hultman – resonator guitar, vocals

=== Former members ===
- Rob Ickes – resonator guitar
- Tom Adams – banjo
- Gaven Largent – resonator guitar
- Justin Moses – resonator guitar

== Discography ==
=== Albums ===
| Title | Album details | Peak positions |
| Title | Album details | US Bluegrass |
|---|---|---|
| It's a Long Long Road | Release date: July 4, 1995; Label: Rebel | — |
| Wind to the West | Release date: July 16, 1996; Label: Rebel | — |
| Midnight Storm | Release date: January 27, 1998; Label: Rebel | — |
| Blue Highway | Release date: July 13, 1999; Label: Skaggs Family | — |
| Still Climbing Mountains | Release date: September 11, 2001; Label: Rounder | — |
| Wondrous Love | Release date: June 24, 2003; Label: Rounder | 10 |
| Marbletown | Release date: June 7, 2005; Label: Rounder | 4 |
| Lonesome Pine | Release date: April 25, 2006; Label: Rebel | — |
| Through the Window of a Train | Release date: February 12, 2008; Label: Rounder | 2 |
| Some Day: The Fifteenth Anniversary Collection | Release date: January 19, 2010; Label: Rounder | 5 |
| Sounds of Home | Release date: August 23, 2011; Label: Rounder | 8 |
| The Game | Release date: January 21, 2014; Label: Rounder | 4 |
| Original Traditional | Release date: September 9, 2016; Label: Rounder | 3 |
| Somewhere Far Away: Silver Anniversary | Release date: August 2, 2019; Label: Rounder | |
| Lonesome State of Mind | Release date: March 29, 2024; Label: Down The Road | |
"—" denotes releases that did not chart
