= Cookie Marenco =

American recording engineer & producer

- Origin: United States
- Occupations: Engineer, producer, composer
- Instruments: Piano, oboe, sitar
- Labels: Blue Coast Records
- Website: cookiemarenco.com

Cookie Marenco is an American audio engineer, record producer, and composer. She is the founder of OTR Studios and Blue Coast Records and has engineered or produced five Grammy-nominated records and has several gold records. She served as sound engineer on an Academy Award-winning documentary. Marenco, along with French engineer Jean Claude Reynaud, developed Extended Sound Environment (E.S.E.), a proprietary recording technique.

== Career ==
=== Engineering and producing ===
Marenco's artist credits include Max Roach, Bryan "Brain" Mantia, Kenny Aronoff, Steve Smith, Brady Blade, Tony Furtado, Tony Trischka, Dirk Powell, Rob Ickes, Charlie Haden, Tony Levin, Steve Rodby, Buckethead, Ralph Towner, Paul McCandless, Ernie Watts, Glen Moore, Mary Chapin Carpenter, John Jennings, Pat DiNizio, Kristin Hersch, Brad Mehldau, Matt Rollings, Kevin Kern, Art Lande, Clara Ponty, Chanticleer, Ladysmith Black Mambazo, Mark Isham and Michael Tolcher.

Her production and engineering skills can be found on projects for Monterey Jazz Festival, Telluride Bluegrass Festival, Marinfest, Midem, Hard Rock Cafe, Windham Hill Records, Verve, Rounder Records, Om Records, Sony, and Warner Bros.

=== Blue Coast Records ===
Marenco and French engineer Jean Claude Reynaud founded Blue Coast Records in 2007. The label is known for using the Direct Stream Digital hi-resolution format, using the labels’ proprietary recording technique Extended Sound Environment (E.S.E.). Artists include Kai Eckhardt, Tony Furtado, Rob Ickes, and others. The label is closely associated with OTR Studios, a recording studio founded by Marenco located on the San Francisco Peninsula.
