= Shannon LaBrie =

American singer-songwriter

- Born: Lincoln, Nebraska, United States
- Website: www.shannonlabrie.com

Shannon LaBrie is an American singer, songwriter, guitarist, and pianist from Lincoln, Nebraska, United States, residing in Nashville, Tennessee, since 2008.

== Career ==
LaBrie has released three studio albums, Just Be Honest (2013) and War & Peace (2016) and her latest album Building released by Moraine Records (2020). The latter album's first single "Firewalker" which was written with Tia Sillers and Joe Robinson, was listed as NPR's "Top 20 Songs of 2020", and the album was listed by NPR's Anne Powers as "Top Fall Albums to Listen Too." LaBrie, also wrote "She Got Soul", a track on Robert Randolph and The Family Band's Grammy Nominated album Got Soul (2017), and "Just Do It", a track on Lily & Madeleine's album Canterbury Girls (2019). LaBrie, also co-wrote "I Got Your Love (You Got Mine)" with Gabe Dixon, which was recorded by Gabe Dixon and Susan Tedeschi of The Tedeschi Trucks Band and released in 2021.

== Discography ==
=== Albums ===
- Just Be Honest (2013)
- War & Peace (2016)
- Building (2020)

=== EPs ===
- Songs from the Smoakstack (2015)
- My Snow Angel (2015)
- Forevermore (2017)
- Home from Anywhere (2019)

=== Singles ===
- "Calls Me Home" (2010)
- "I Remember a Boy" (2012)
- "Alcohol (Acoustic Version)" (2015)
- "It's Political" (2016)
- "Crazy Enough" (2016)
- "Stubborn Heart" (2017)
- "All by Myself (Acoustic Cover)" (2019)
- "I Hope You Dance" (2019)
- "Firewalker" (2020)

=== Music videos ===
| Title | Year | Director(s) | Ref. |
|---|---|---|---|
| "Then There's You" featuring Gabe Dixon | 2016 | | |
| "Alcohol" | 2016 | Fairlight Hubbard | |
| "It's Political" | 2016 | Seth Christian | |
| "All By Myself" | 2019 | | |
| "Take Me Out" | 2019 | | |
| "Charge" with Gabe Dixon | 2020 | Chris Phelps | |
| "Firewalker" | 2020 | | |
