= Gareth Dunlop =

Northern Irish singer-songwriter

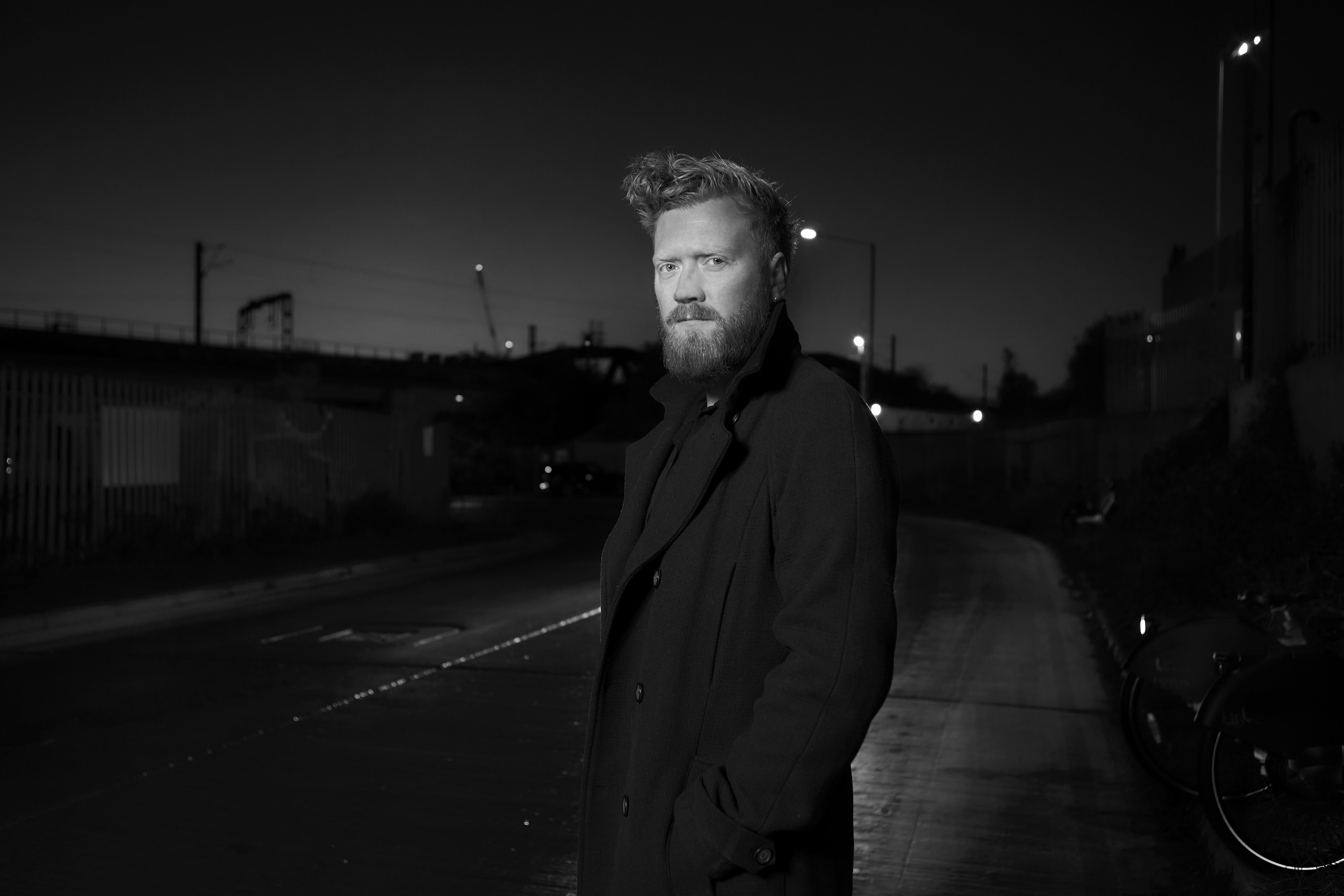

Gareth Dunlop (born East Belfast) is a pop artist from Northern Ireland who is a multi-instrumentalist, engineer and record producer. His distinct songwriting and vocal styles have led to many of his songs' being featured in numerous television shows, films and commercials. In 2013, Dunlop's song "Wrap Your Arms Around Me" was part of the soundtrack for the movie Safe Haven based on a romance novel by Nicholas Sparks. His song was the second best selling single on the album.

Dunlop has worked as a staff songwriter for Round Hill Music, Moraine Music Group, Nettwerk Music Group, Universal Music Publishing Group and Zenith Publishing.

As a songwriter and artist, Dunlop uses influences of synth & dream pop, folk and soul, which can be heard in several films, television shows and commercials. In 2013, Dunlop's "Wrap Your Arms Around Me" was included in the Safe Haven soundtrack and was one of the featured music videos from the film, alongside music by artists Colbie Caillat, Gavin DeGraw, Amos Lee, Brandi Carlile, Ben Harper, and others. Other songs by Dunlop also appear in commercials for Subaru in the US Discover Northern Ireland, See Montery, Amica and Disney Germany. Television shows featuring Dunlop's songs include Nashville, House, One Tree Hill, Private Practice, Switched at Birth, Army Wives, Lucifer, Cougar Town, Love Island and Bones.

== Early career ==
Dunlop picked up his dad's old Yamaha guitar at age 14 and began listening to an extensive collection of vinyl LPs and 45s at age 15. He was inspired by artists like The Beatles, Bob Dylan, and Jimmy Page. Dunlop started performing at the age of 16 in clubs and festivals around Northern Ireland and the UK where he received recognition as a captivating live performer with "a voice that can tame dinosaurs.". Dunlop has opened for John Oates, Jeff Beck, the Stereophonics, James Morrison, Imelda May, Snow Patrol, Paul Carrack, Jools Holland, Angus & Julia Stone, Nanci Griffithm, the Steeldrivers and others. In 2011, he was chosen to perform in the Belfast Nashville Singer Songwriter's Festival where he was awarded 2011 Young Songwriter of the Year. The festival brought Dunlop to Nashville, leading to US tours and a publishing deal with Moraine Music and Nettwerk Music Group. Dunlop recorded his debut single in Northern Ireland, "Fool's Desire," and his Devil Mocks Me EP with 6-time Grammy winning producer, Brent Maher.

== Discography ==
=== Devil Mocks Me (2011) EP ===
1. "Fool's Desire"
2. "Find Your Way Back Home"
3. "What You Do To Me"
4. "Trick Of The Moonlight"
5. "Devil Mocks Me"

=== Safe Haven (5 February 2013) Soundtrack ===
1. Colbie Caillat featuring Gavin DeGraw – "We Both Know"
2. Tristan Prettyman – "Say Anything"
3. Ben Howard – "Keep Your Head Up"
4. Dar Williams – "Summer Child"
5. The White Buffalo – "Sleepy Little Town"
6. Gareth Dunlop – "Wrap Your Arms Around Me"
7. Sara Haze – "Moonshine"
8. FM Radio – "The Journey"
9. Brandi Carlile – "Heart's Content" (Strings Mix)
10. Amos Lee – "Violin"
11. The Deep Dark Woods – "My Baby's Got To Pay The Rent"
12. Deborah Lurie – "Canoeing" (Katie and Alex's Theme)

=== How Far This Road Goes (17 October 2014) EP ===
1. "Hide and Seek"
2. "Better Part of Me"
3. "Hand Me Downs"
4. "Name on a Chair"
5. "How Far This Road Goes"

=== The Best of Me (2014) Soundtrack ===
1. "Hold On" (Gareth Dunlop & SHEL)

=== Rooms (30 June 2017) EP ===
1. "Firefly"
2. "Dreamers"
3. "Tangled Up"
4. "Miss Previously Loved"
5. "On The Line"
6. "Some Day"

=== No. 79 (11 August 2017) ===
1. "New Day"
2. "29 Times"
3. "High Life"
4. "Never Let It Die"
5. "She Is The Fire"
6. "The Moon and Me"
7. "What It Wants"
8. "Fired First" (feat. Kim Richey)
9. "Do What You Do"
10. "Younger Me"

=== Pieces (27 October 2017) EP ===
1. "I Fall to Pieces"
2. "Be My Baby"
3. "Come Fly With Me"
4. "Somewhere There's a Someone"
5. "Amazing Grace"

=== Many Moons Ago (15 June 2018) EP ===
1. "Devil Like You"
2. "Can't Stand Myself"
3. "Blind To The Pain"
4. "Way Back When"
5. "Dwell In My Soul"

=== Born Uncool (18 September 2020) ===
1. Born Uncool
2. Train Driver
3. Carry You
4. Summer Grass
5. In a Hundred Years

=== Animal (22 April 2022) ===
1. Animal
2. Pulling Heaven Down
3. Look Back Smiling
4. Old Friends
5. Sorrow
6. Humans
7. Headlights
8. My Kind Of Paradise
9. Right About Ready
10. Prisoner Of My Past

== TV and film appearances ==
Song	Show/Promo
"Dark Dark Days"	Suits
"A Few Steps My Way" "Together We Stand" "Falling" "Keep Coming Back" "Moving On Never Felt So Good"	Nashville
"Devil Like You"	Lucifer
"Hold On"	The Best of Me
"Reach Out"	Amica Insurance
"One and The Same"	Bones
"Wrap Your Arms Around Me"	Safe Haven
"Trick of the Moonlight"	House The Nine Lives of Chloe King
"Going Somewhere"	Subaru Northern Ireland Bureau
"Miss Previously Loved"	Private Practice
"Tangled Up"	Cougar Town Army Wives Autism Speaks
"How Far This Road Goes"	Tourism Ireland
"Despair"	Underemployed
"Deep Inside"	Make It or Break It
"Firefly"	Autism Speaks
"Dreamers"	Private Practice
