= SHEL =

American folk/pop band

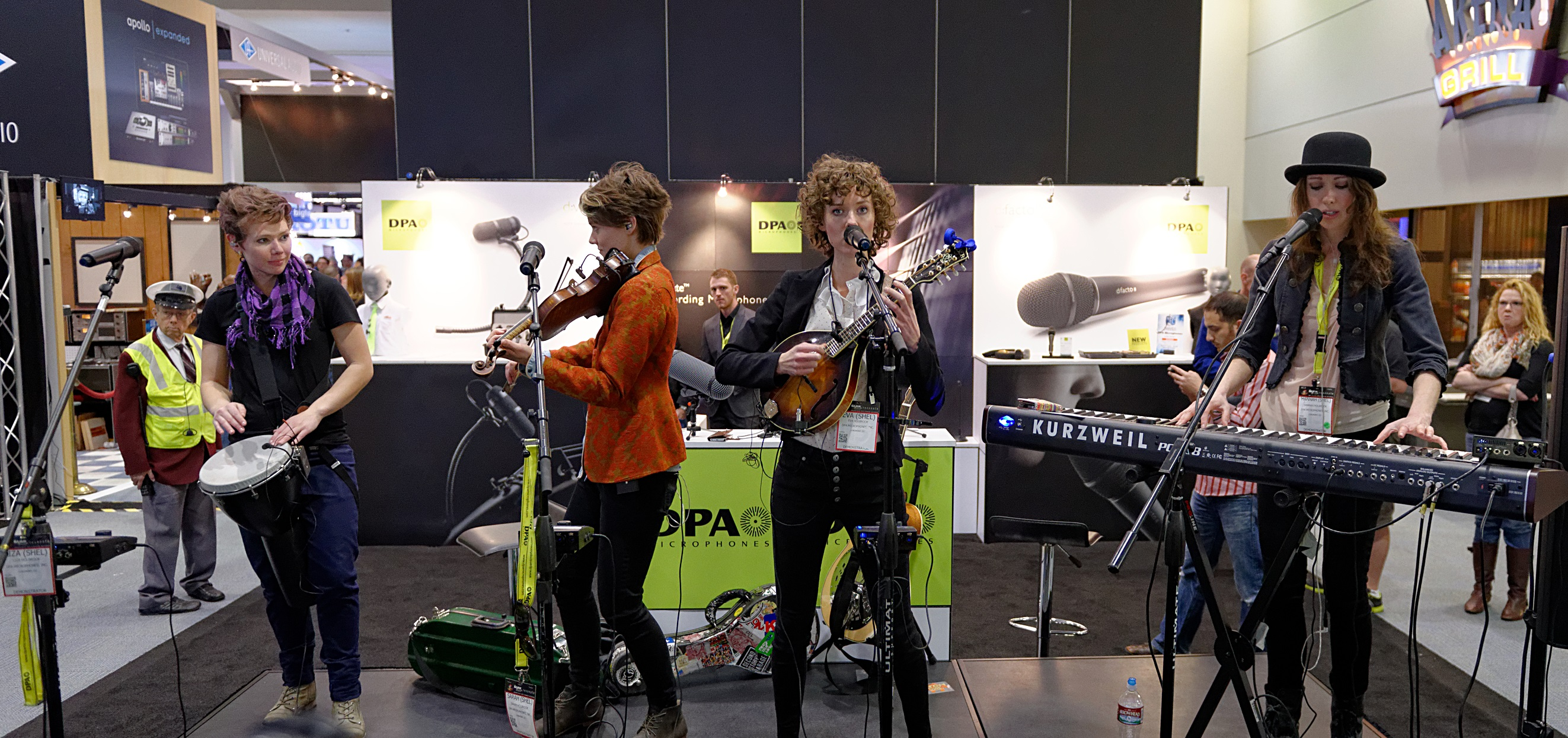
- SHEL in 2015

Background information
- Origin: Fort Collins, Colorado, U.S.
- Years active: 2010–present
- Label: Moraine Music Group
- Members: Sarah Holbrook; Hannah Holbrook; Eva Holbrook; Liza Holbrook
- Website: shelmusic.com

SHEL is an American folk/pop band from Fort Collins, Colorado, United States. The band is composed of the four Holbrook sisters, where SHEL is an acronym for their names, Sarah, Hannah, Eva and Liza. Eva is on lead vocals, guitar, banjo, cello, and mandolin; Hannah on vocals, accordion and keys; Sarah on vocals, bass and fiddle; and Liza on percussion, djembe, and beat boxing. They began their career backing up their father, guitarist/singer Andrew Holbrook.

The band takes part in directing their own music videos.

== Career ==
=== Early career ===
Sarah, Hannah, Eva, and Liza were born within five years of each other. As children, they were raised and home-schooled by an artist mother and professional songwriter father. They formed a family-style folk band with their father Andrew Holbrook before forming the band SHEL. SHEL has been performing since 2005.

A friend of the family made a connection with Grammy-winning producer Brent Maher of Moraine Music Group, which led to a publishing deal. Over three years SHEL completed several EPs, and released a self-titled debut album. Between 2010 and 2011, they were signed with Republic Nashville, but did not release anything for the label.

=== Filmography ===
SHEL's music can be heard in television shows including ABC Family/ABC.com's On The Rise. Their new song "When The Sky Fell" and "just a shadow" was featured in ABC Family's new show The Fosters and "On My Way" can be heard in the CBS series Made In Jersey. The song "Wise Old Owl" was featured in the new Splenda commercial. The song "I was Born a Dreamer" was featured in a Toys"R"Us 2015 holiday commercial. More of SHEL's music can also be found in Glade's Scented Oil Candles national television ad campaign. Their music has also been used in an independent film. Their song "Stronger Than My Fears" was used in a TV commercial for the drug product Dolex Forte (GSK) in Colombia.

== Discography ==
=== Studio albums ===
- Shel (2012)
- Just Crazy Enough (2016
- A Family Christmas (2018) with Jars of Clay
