= Tony Furtado =

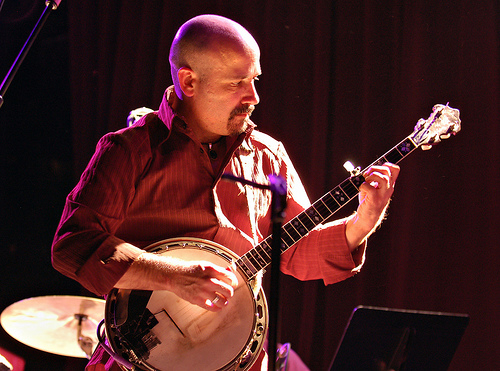
- Fox Theater, Boulder, Colorado, February 8, 2008

Background information
- Born: October 18, 1967 (age 58); Pleasanton, California, U.S.
- Genres: Bluegrass, country, rock
- Occupation: Musician
- Instrument(s): banjo, slide guitar, electric guitar
- Labels: Rounder, Yousay Furtado Records
- Website: www.tonyfurtado.com

Tony Furtado (born October 18, 1967) is an American singer-songwriter, banjoist, and guitarist.

== History ==
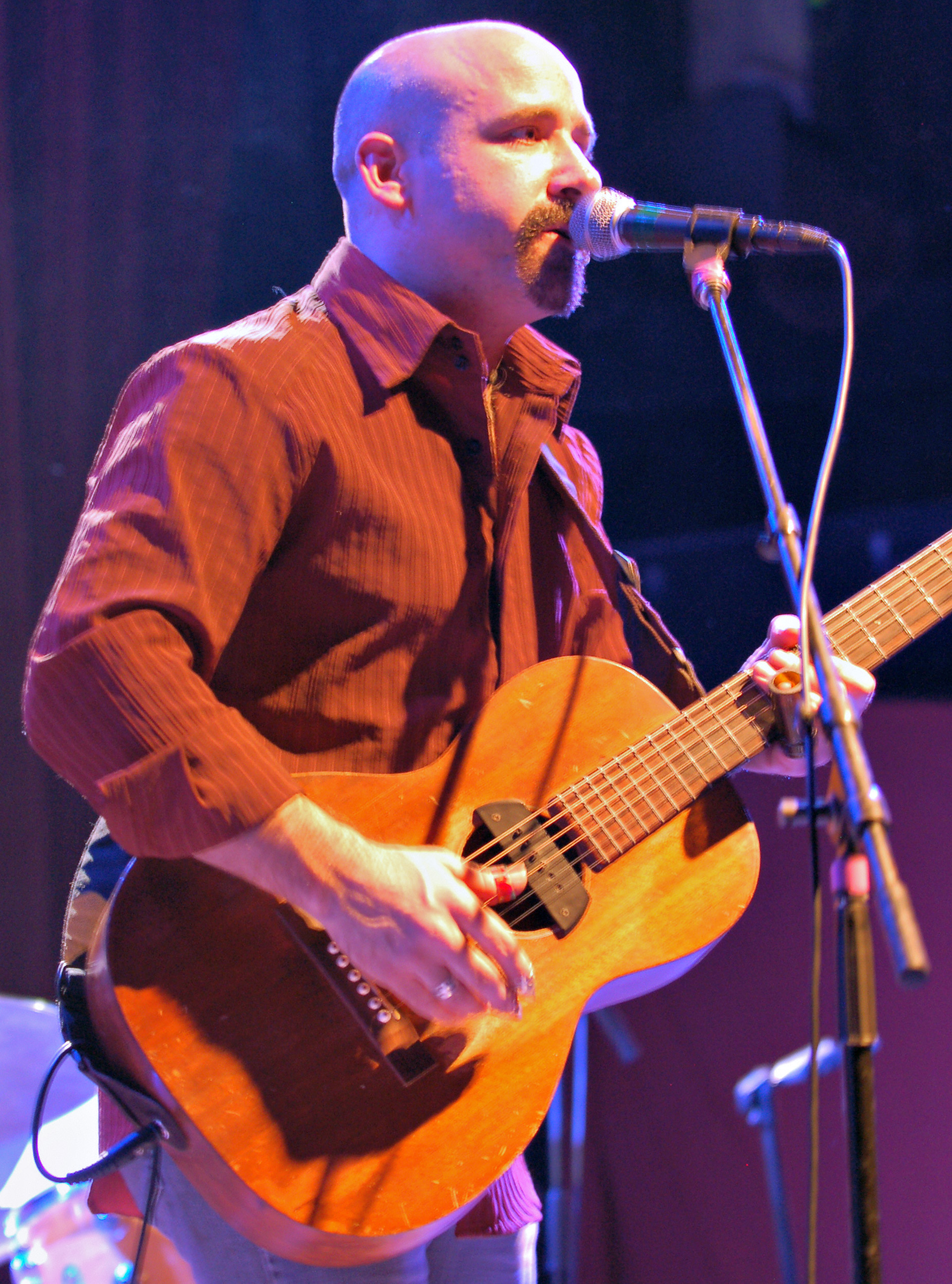
Fox Theater, Boulder, Colorado, February 8, 2008

Furtado was born in Pleasanton, California. He took up the banjo at age 12, inspired by the Beverly Hillbillies television show and a sixth-grade music report. He studied music and art at California State, Hayward. He first attracted national attention in 1987, when he won the National Bluegrass Banjo Championship in Winfield, Kansas. Then he toured with bluegrass musician Laurie Lewis. Rounder Records released his debut album, Swamped, in 1990.

In 1990, Tony signed a recording deal with Rounder Records, one of the country's preeminent independent record companies. Beginning with Swamped in 1990, he recorded six critically acclaimed albums for the label, collaborating with such master musicians as Alison Krauss, Jerry Douglas, Tim O'Brien, Stuart Duncan, Kelly Joe Phelps and Mike Marshall. During this period, Tony also performed and recorded with the band SugarBeat and the Rounder Banjo Extravaganza with Tony Trischka and Tom Adams.

Beginning in the late 1990s – influenced by such musicians as Ry Cooder, David Lindley and Taj Mahal – Tony added slide guitar, singing and songwriting to his musical toolbox and began leading his own band.

Furtado is an accomplished sculptor.

== Performance ==
Furtado is a tireless road musician who performs in a variety of formats: solo, in a duo, or trio or with his full five-person band. He has toured with such legendary musicians as Gregg Allman and with such esteemed slide guitarists as David Lindley, Derek Trucks, and Sonny Landreth.

He has performed throughout the world at top venues and appeared at such prestigious music festivals as the Telluride Bluegrass Festival, High Sierra Music Festival, Jazz Aspen, Kerrville Folk Festival, Strawberry Music Festival, Winnipeg Folk Festival, Sisters Folk Festival, San Jose Jazz Festival and countless others. . His second album, Within Reach (1992), featured bluegrass veterans Alison Krauss and Jerry Douglas.

He recorded a duet album with Dirk Powell.

== Band ==
His band Sugarbeat also featured Ben Demerath (vocals, guitar), Matt Flinner (mandolin), and Sally Truitt (bass).

== Awards and honors ==
- Won National Bluegrass Banjo Championship, Winfield, Kansas, 1987 and 1991

== Musical style ==
Tony is an evocative and soulful singer, a wide-ranging songwriter and a virtuoso multi-instrumental-ist adept on banjo, cello-banjo, slide guitar and baritone ukulele who mixes and matches sounds and styles with the flair of a master chef. Comparisons to Ry Cooder were rooted in Furtado's combination of jazz, Celtic, and old-time music. On his third album, Full Circle (1994) he concentrated on acoustic blues and slide guitar, with Cooder as an influence.

"Furtado mixes Americana, folk, indie-rock, blues, and jazz styles."

"As a banjo virtuoso, Furtado is well known for his envelope-pushing, progressive bluegrass stylings. His picking is rapid-fire quick, sharp and clear, and puts him in the school of Béla Fleck and David Grisman."

"He mixes bluegrass roots with a mainstream pop streak, easily holding the spotlight, thanks to his restrained virtuosity on acoustic and slide guitar and a warmly engaging voice reminiscent of T Bone Burnett, sans preachiness. – Paste magazine

== Discography ==
- Swamped (Rounder, 1990)
- Within Reach (Rounder, 1992)
- Full Circle (Rounder, 1994)
- Roll My Blues Away (Rounder, 1997)
- Tony Furtado & Dirk Powell (Rounder, 1999)
- Tony Furtado Band (Rounder, 2000)
- American Gypsy (What Are, 2002)
- Live Gypsy (Dualtone, 2003)
- These Chains (Funzalo, 2004)
- Bare Bones (Funzalo, 2005)
- Thirteen (Funzalo, 2007)
- Deepwater (Funzalo, 2008)
- Golden (Funzalo, 2010)
- Live at Mississippi Studios (Funzalo, 2012)
- The Bell (Yousay Furtado Records, 2015)
- Cider House Sessions (Yousay Furtado Records, 2017)
- Decembering (Yousay Furtado Records, 2021)
