= Rob Ickes =

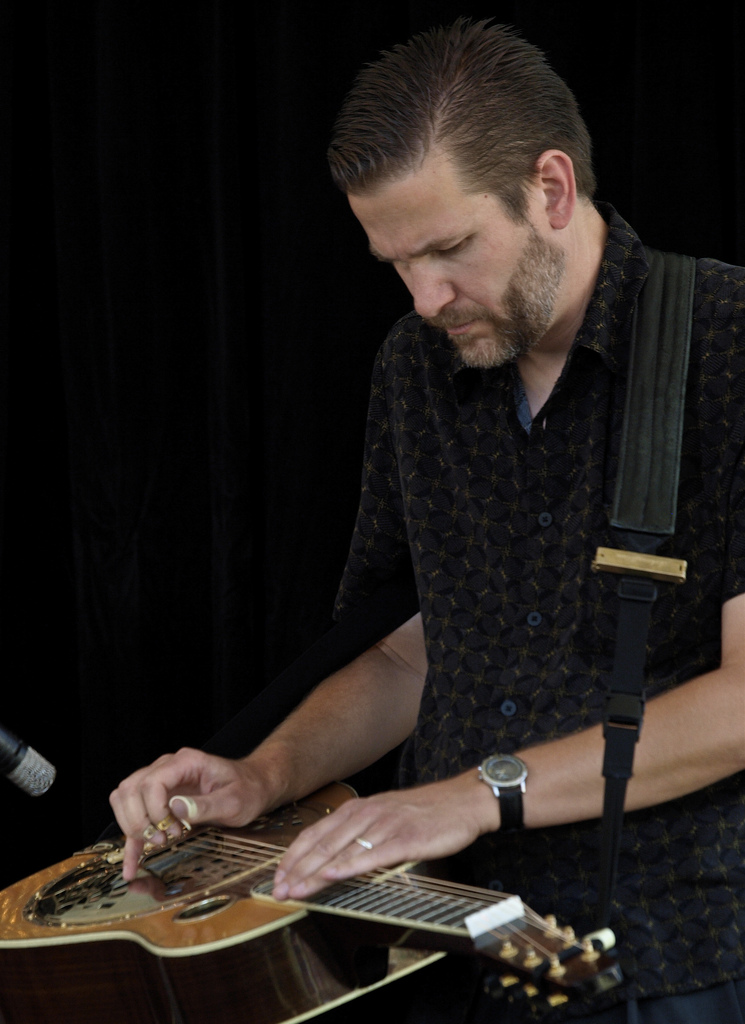
- Performing with Blue Highway. June 21, 2010

Background information
- Born: May 26, 1967 (age 59); San Francisco, California, U.S.
- Genres: Bluegrass, country, jazz
- Occupations: Musician, instructor
- Instrument: Resonator guitar
- Years active: 1992–present
- Website: www.robickes.com

Rob Ickes (/aɪks/; born May 26, 1967) is an American dobro (resonator guitar) player from San Francisco, California. Ickes moved to Nashville in 1992 and joined the contemporary bluegrass band Blue Highway as a founding member in 1994. He currently collaborates with guitarist Trey Hensley, with whom he has released four albums. Ickes has been nominated for numerous Grammy Awards, winning two in 1994 for bluegrass and gospel albums he contributed to, and another in 2025 for a collaborative album with Taj Mahal. He has also won thirty nine International Bluegrass Music Awards, including winning Resophonic Guitar Player of the Year fifteen times.

== Biography ==
After spending 21 years as Blue Highway's dobro player, Ickes left the band in 2015. Currently, he records and performs with guitarist Trey Hensley. The duo has released four albums with Compass Records: Living in a Song (2023), World Full of Blues (2019), The Country Blues (2016), and Before the Sun Goes Down (2014). Before the Sun Goes Down was nominated for a Grammy in 2016. As a duo, Ickes and Hensley have performed and recorded with Taj Mahal, Tommy Emmanuel, David Grisman, Molly Tuttle, and Jorma Kaukonen and Hot Tuna.

In 2013, he was named Dobro Player of the Year for the fifteenth time by the International Bluegrass Music Association. With a total of 39 awards across several different categories, IBMA notes that he is the most awarded instrumentalist in the history of the IBMA Awards. He was also named the USA Peter Cummings Fellow in 2010 by United States Artists, an organization that annually honors 50 of America's finest artists across eight disciplines. In 2025, Ickes won a Grammy for "Best Traditional Blues Album" as part of a collaboration with Taj Mahal.

In 2014, Ickes was featured on an album with fellow dobro greats Jerry Douglas and Mike Auldridge, titled Three Bells. This album was nominated for a Grammy in 2015. His other solo projects include Road Song, a jazz project with pianist Michael Alvey and vocalist Robinella (ResoRevolution), and four solo albums on Rounder Records: Big Time (2004), What It Is (2002), Slide City (1999), and Hard Times (1997). Ickes has also performed and recorded with a "jamgrass acoustic power trio", Three Ring Circle, with Andy Leftwich and Dave Pomeroy. Three Ring Circle released a self-titled CD in 2006, (Earwave Records), followed by Brothership in 2010 (ResoRevolution). Ickes has also released a studio performance DVD+CD, Rob Ickes: Contemporary Dobro Artistry (2008, Mel Bay), featuring duos with mandolinist Andy Leftwich, solo performances, and duos with jazz pianist Michael Alvey.

Ickes was the youngest dobro player on The Great Dobro Sessions, produced by Jerry Douglas and Tut Taylor, which won the 1994 Grammy for Best Bluegrass Album. He was also on the Alison Krauss and The Cox Family album, I Know Who Holds Tomorrow, which won the 1994 Grammy for Best Southern Gospel.

He has also collaborated with a wide range of musicians, including Merle Haggard, Earl Scruggs, Tony Rice, Charlie Haden, David Grisman, Alison Krauss, Willie Nelson, David Lee Roth, Dolly Parton, Patty Loveless, Peter Rowan, Niall Toner, Claire Lynch, and Mary Chapin Carpenter and the southern gospel group The Dunaways. His work with Merle Haggard includes Haggard's 2007 release, "The Bluegrass Sessions" (McCoury Music). Other notable collaborations include the CD Earl Scruggs with Family & Friends, The Ultimate Collection: Live at the Ryman (2008, Rounder), nominated for the 2009 Grammy for Best Bluegrass Album; and "Earl Scruggs, Doc Watson, Ricky Skaggs, The Three Pickers" (2003, Rounder DVD & CD), which appeared on the Billboard Bluegrass Chart for 138 weeks. Ickes also played on Mark Twain: Words & Music in 2011, a benefit CD for the Mark Twain Boyhood Home & Museum produced by Carl Jackson. The project featured Clint Eastwood, Jimmy Buffett, Garrison Keillor, Brad Paisley, Sheryl Crow, Vince Gill, Emmylou Harris, and others.

Active in dobro workshops and instruction, Ickes is the founder and producer of Resosummit, a 3-day educational event held in Nashville annually since 2007, with 100 students, 10+ faculty, and key luthiers, with workshops, master classes, and performances. He frequently serves as an instructor at music workshops and camps, including NashCamp, Sore Fingers Week (UK), Rockygrass Academy (CO), Wintergrass Academy (WA), and Jorma Kaukonen's Fur Peace Ranch Guitar Camp (OH).

In 2019, Ickes began offering video instruction on Big Music Tent, an online music lessons platform. He uploads regular videos and interacts with dobro students on his dedicated learning page, "Rob's Reso Room."
