= Jubilee (Old Crow Medicine Show album) =

Studio album by Old Crow Medicine Show
- Released: August 25, 2023
- Studio: Hartland Studio (Nashville, Tennessee); Palomino Sound (Los Angeles, California)
- Genre: Bluegrass
- Length: 41:08
- Label: ATO
- Producer: Old Crow Medicine Show

Old Crow Medicine Show chronology
Paint This Town (2022)	Jubilee (2023)

Singles from Jubilee
- 1. "Miles Away" Released: June 20, 2023

Jubilee is the eighth studio album by folk band Old Crow Medicine Show. It was released on 25 August 2023, through ATO Records. The album was nominated for the Grammy Award for Best Folk Album at the 66th Annual Grammy Awards.

Professional ratings
Review scores
Source	Rating
AllMusic	4/5 stars
American Songwriter	4/5 stars
PopMatters	7/10

== Track listing ==
All tracks are written by Ketch Secor, with additional co-writers as noted.

No.	Title	Writer(s)	Length
1.	"The Ballad of Jubilee Jones"	Mike Harris; Mason Via	3:08
2.	"Miles Away" (featuring Willie Watson)	Molly Tuttle	5:00
3.	"Keel Over and Die"		3:31
4.	"Allegheny Lullaby"	Via	3:59
5.	"I Want It Now"	Via	1:55
6.	"Smoky Mountain Girl"		3:45
7.	"Belle Meade Cockfight" (featuring Sierra Ferrell)	Matt Ross-Spang; Via	2:53
8.	"Shit Kicked In" (featuring Sierra Ferrell)	Via	3:37
9.	"Daughter of the Highlands"	Via	4:22
10.	"Wolfman of the Ozarks"	Harris; Jerry Pentecost; Via	2:23
11.	"Nameless, TN"	Joe Andrews	4:15
12.	"One Drop" (featuring Mavis Staples)	Harris; Pentecost	3:20
Total length:			41:08

== Charts ==
Chart performance for Jubilee
Chart (2023)	Peak position
US Top Bluegrass Albums (Billboard)	1
