= City of Gold (Molly Tuttle album) =

Studio album by Molly Tuttle
- Released: July 21, 2023
- Studios: Sound Emporium (Nashville, Tennessee)
- Genre: Bluegrass
- Length: 46:59
- Label: Nonesuch
- Producers: Jerry Douglas, Molly Tuttle

Molly Tuttle chronology
Crooked Tree (2022)	City of Gold (2023)	So Long Little Miss Sunshine (2025)

Singles from City of Gold
- 1. "El Dorado" Released: April 27, 2023; 2. "Next Rodeo" Released: June 15, 2023; 3. "San Joaquin" Released: June 29, 2023

City of Gold is the fourth studio album by American bluegrass singer and musician Molly Tuttle. Released on July 21, 2023, it is Tuttle's second album for Nonesuch Records and features her band Golden Highway, who also receive star billing. A follow-up to their 2022 project Crooked Tree, the album was co-produced by Tuttle and dobro player Jerry Douglas and includes a collaboration with Dave Matthews. Songwriting collaborators include Melody Walker, Golden Highway member Shelby Means and Old Crow Medicine Show's Ketch Secor and Mason Via. The project was inspired by Tuttle's year of touring with Golden Highway and their having grown closer and more cohesive as a band. It was preceded by the singles "El Dorado", "Next Rodeo" and "San Joaquin". City of Gold was the final album to feature Golden Highway, as Tuttle announced the dissolution of the band in May 2025.

It won the Grammy Award for Best Bluegrass Album at the 66th Annual Grammy Awards.

== Background ==
The album was announced on April 27, 2023, alongside the release of the lead single "El Dorado". In a press release reflecting on the album, Tuttle explained "When I was a kid, we took a field trip to Coloma, CA to learn about the gold rush. I'll never forget the dusty hills and the grizzled old miner who showed us the nugget around his neck. Just like gold fever, music has always captivated me, captured my heart, and driven me to great lengths to explore its depths. On my new album I dug deep as a songwriter and co-producer and surfaced with a record that celebrates the music of my heart, my life, the land where I grew up, and the stories I heard along the way. I made this record with my band Golden Highway after playing over 100 shows across the country last year. On the road and in the studio, we are inspired by artists such as John Hartford, Gillian Welch and Peter Rowan to name a few, whose records are like family albums to us. Just like them, on this album we chart some new territory along some old familiar ground. The songs span from breakdowns to ballads, fairytales and fiddle tunes, from Yosemite up to the Gold Country and out beyond the mountains. That visit to Coloma, site of California's first gold strike is where I first heard about El Dorado, the city of gold. Playing music can take you to a place that is just as precious. I hope you like this record!"

The second track to be released from the album was "Next Rodeo", which premiered alongside its official music video on June 15, 2023. Describing the song, Tuttle stated, "my song 'Next Rodeo' is all about traveling from show to show and chasing down a dream."

"San Joaquin" was released as the album's third single on June 29. Of the song, Tuttle explained, "I've always loved singing songs about trains and this one takes place in my home state of California. Ketch and I had the idea for writing 'San Joaquin' while looking at a map of different train lines that run through the state. Ketch loves writing geographical songs and I have many fond memories of road trips taken through the Central Valley when I was a kid, so we dreamed up this story of a wild ride down the San Joaquin railway."

== Critical reception ==
Professional ratings
Aggregate scores
Source	Rating
Metacritic	77/100
Review scores
Source	Rating
American Songwriter	4/5 stars
The Observer	4/5 stars
PopMatters	8/10

City of Gold received a score of 77 out of 100 on review aggregator Metacritic based on five critics' reviews, indicating "generally favorable" reception. Mojo felt that "at times City of Gold may sound a little hungover after the euphoric heights of 2022, but Tuttle shows every sign of pushing through", while Uncut remarked that it is "all expertly tied together by Tuttle's rare gift for nuance and colour".

The Observer's Neil Spencer described it as being "gritty country with pyrotechnics" and "a whirlwind of virtuoso Americana" as it "continues seamlessly" from 2022's Crooked Tree. Justin Cober-Lake of PopMatters wrote that "Tuttle keeps the energy as high as always" and while "Crooked Tree might have felt like a peak, [...] with City of Gold, Tuttle continues her ascent" on "one of the year's best albums". Lee Zimmerman of American Songwriter stated that on the album, Tuttle "proves that she's able to maintain the momentum she's built up until now", with its slower songs "assur[ing that] an emotional essence remains intact throughout".

== Track listing ==
City of Gold track listing
No.	Title	Writer(s)	Length
1.	"El Dorado"	Ketch Secor; Molly Tuttle	4:23
2.	"Where Did All the Wild Things Go?"	Secor; Tuttle	3:58
3.	"San Joaquin"	Secor; Tuttle	2:37
4.	"Yosemite" (featuring Dave Matthews)	Secor; Tuttle	3:10
5.	"Next Rodeo"	Shelby Means; Secor; Tuttle; Melody Walker	3:47
6.	"When My Race Is Run"	Secor; Tuttle	4:22
7.	"Alice in the Bluegrass"	Secor; Tuttle	4:04
8.	"Stranger Things"	Secor; Tuttle	4:01
9.	"Down Home Dispensary"	Secor; Tuttle; Mason Via	2:42
10.	"More Like a River"	Secor; Tuttle	2:57
11.	"Goodbye Mary"	Secor; Tuttle	4:12
12.	"Evergreen, OK"	Secor; Tuttle	2:53
13.	"The First Time I Fell in Love"	Secor; Tuttle	3:53
Total length:			46:59

== Personnel ==
Credits adapted from AllMusic.

- Molly Tuttle – lead vocals, backing vocals, guitar, production

Golden Highway

- Bronwyn Keith-Hynes – fiddle
- Dominick Leslie – mandolin
- Shelby Means – bass
- Kyle Tuttle – banjo

Other musicians

- Jerry Douglas – dobro, mixing, production
- Dave Matthews – vocals
- Jordan Perlsan – drums

Production

- Paul Blakemore – mastering
- David Paulin – assistant engineering
- Bobbi Rich – photography
- Neil Steinhardt – art direction, design
- Sean Sullivan – engineering, mixing

== Charts ==
Chart performance for City of Gold
Chart (2023)	Peak position
Hungarian Physical Albums (MAHASZ)	30
Scottish Albums (Official Charts)	29
UK Album Downloads (Official Charts)	54
UK Country Albums (Official Charts)	3
US Top Bluegrass Albums (Billboard)	1
