= Mason Via =

American musician

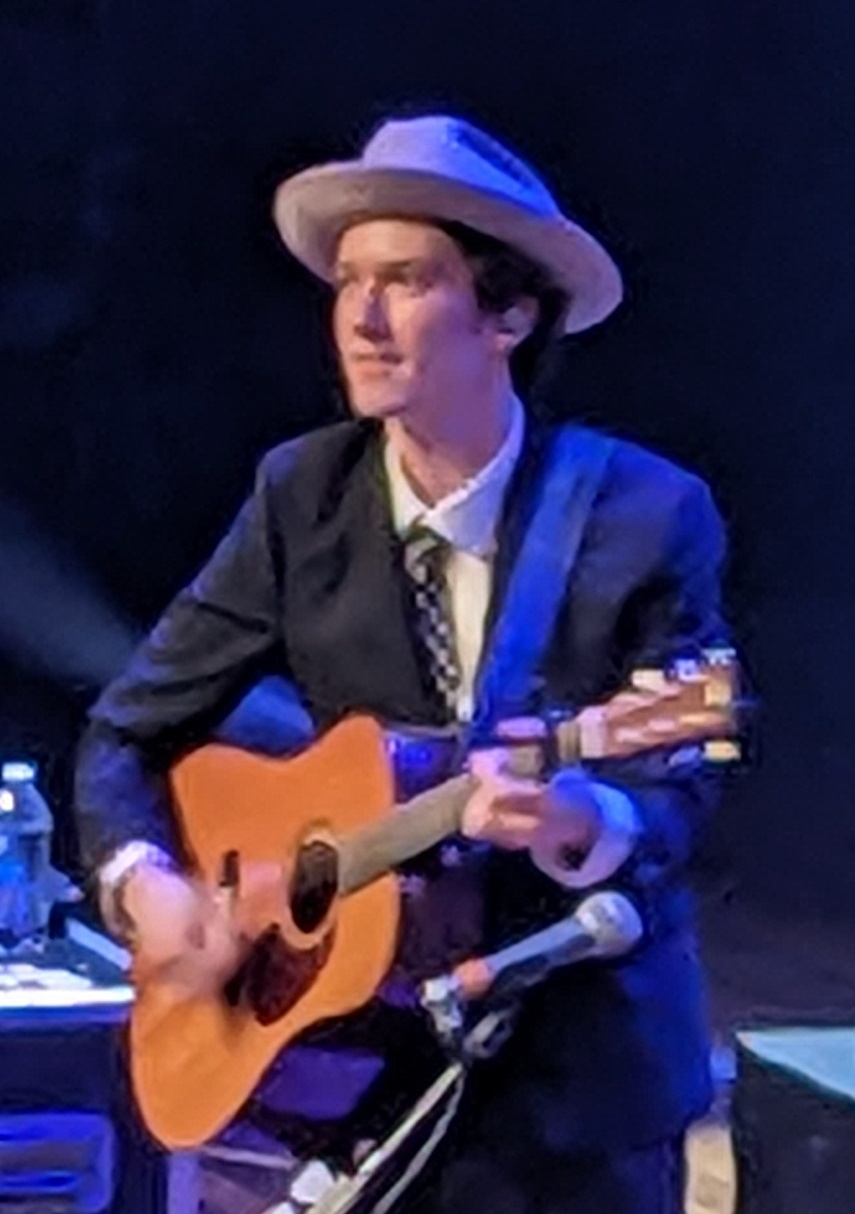
- Via performing with Old Crow Medicine Show in 2023

Background information
- Also known as: Mason Picks
- Genres: Bluegrass; Americana; country
- Occupation: Singer-songwriter
- Instruments: Vocals; guitar; banjo guitar
- Years active: 2015–present
- Labels: Mountain Fever Records; Patuxent Music
- Formerly of: Old Crow Medicine Show
- Website: masonvia.com

Mason Via (/vaɪ/) is an American singer-songwriter and guitarist. He is a former member of Old Crow Medicine Show. Via released his debut self-released solo album Up, Up, Up in 2015; his first album on Mountain Fever Records, New Horizons, in 2022; and a self-titled album in 2025.

== Early life ==
Via grew up in southern Virginia and North Carolina. His father, David Via, is a bluegrass songwriter. Via learned to play the guitar at age 12 and began focusing on a bluegrass music career at age 16.

== Career ==
A bluegrass singer-songwriter and guitarist, Via released his debut solo album, Up, Up, Up, in 2015. He joined bluegrass and Americana band Old Crow Medicine Show from 2021 to 2024; he left the band to pursue a solo career, citing a desire for fewer creative "limitations". Via released a self-titled album on Mountain Fever Records in 2025.

Via and Old Crow Medicine Show were nominated for a Grammy Award for the album Jubilee. Songs written by Via have been covered by the Del McCoury Band on their album Almost Proud and by Molly Tuttle on her album City of Gold. Via's song "Oh Lordy Me" featuring Ronnie Bowman and Junior Sisk was named by Billboard as a "must-hear new country song". He opened for I'm With Her on the band's Wild and Clear and Blue tour in 2025.

Via headlined the Levitt AMP Sheboygan Music Series in Sheboygan, Wisconsin, on July 3, 2025. On December 13, 2025, he performed at a benefit concert in Brown County, Indiana, supporting a local food pantry and a youth music charity. In 2026, Via partnered with the National Parks Conservation Association to support protection for United States national parks. He covered Woody Guthrie's protest song "Deportee (Plane Wreck at Los Gatos)" with Lucinda Williams in 2026.

Via competed on American Idol season 19 in 2021 under the stage name Mason Picks.

== Critical reception ==
Reviewing Via's 2025 self-titled album, The Aquarian Weekly said its tracks "exemplify modern bluegrass at its best". Of the same album, Bluegrass Today said, "it’s a credit to Via’s skill and savvy that he’s been able to maintain such a high bar".

Via was named by the International Bluegrass Music Association as New Artist of the Year for 2026.

== Discography ==
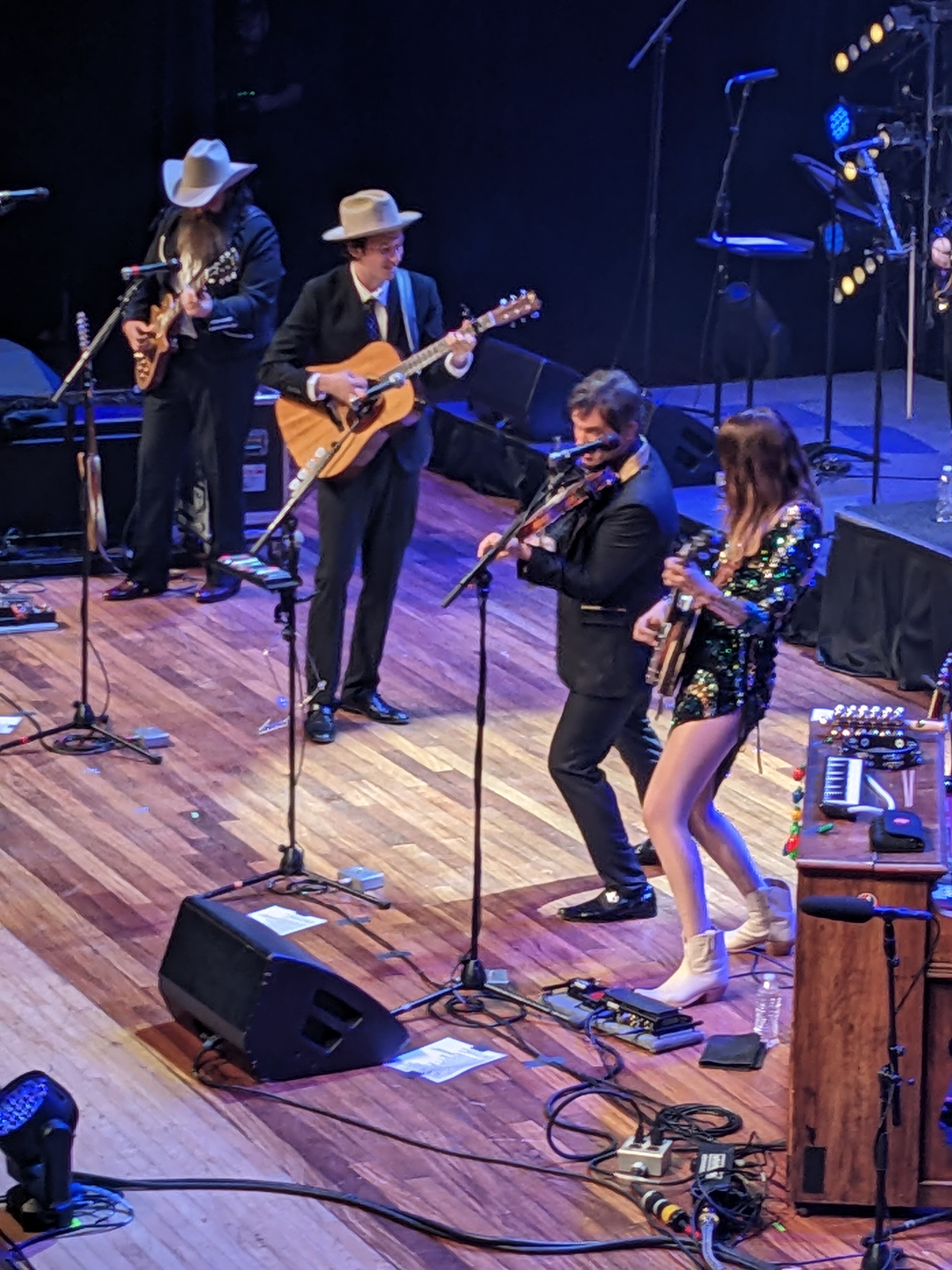
Via (second from left) performing with Old Crow Medicine Show and Molly Tuttle in 2023

=== As solo artist ===
Year	Album	Record label
2015	Up, Up, Up	Self-released
2018	Tom Mindte & Mason Via with Tom Mindte	Patuxent Music
2019	409 with Tom Mindte and Ben Somerville	Patuxent Music
2019	Tom Mindte, Mason Via & Ben Somerville Christmas EP	Patuxent Music
2020	Live from Rooster Walk	Self-released
2022	New Horizons	Mountain Fever Records
2025	Mason Via	Mountain Fever Records

=== With Old Crow Medicine Show ===
Year	Album	Record label	US Grass peak position
2022	Paint This Town	ATO Records	1
2023	Jubilee	ATO Records	1
