= So Long Little Miss Sunshine =

Studio album by Molly Tuttle
- Released: August 15, 2025
- Recorded: October–November 2024
- Studios: Neon Cross Studio, Nashville; Georgetown Masters, Nashville
- Genres: Country pop; bluegrass
- Length: 45:36
- Label: Nonesuch
- Producer: Jay Joyce

Molly Tuttle chronology
| City of Gold (2023) | So Long Little Miss Sunshine (2025) |

Singles from So Long Little Miss Sunshine
- 1. "That's Gonna Leave a Mark" Released: June 3, 2025; 2. "The Highway Knows" Released: July 10, 2025; 3. "Old Me (New Wig)" Released: July 31, 2025

So Long Little Miss Sunshine is the fifth studio album by American bluegrass musician Molly Tuttle. It was released on August 15, 2025, via Nonesuch Records in LP, CD and digital formats.

So Long Little Miss Sunshine was nominated for a Grammy Award for Best Americana Album, and the song "That's Gonna Leave a Mark" was nominated for Best Americana Performance.

== Background ==
Composing twelve tracks ranging between two and four minutes, with a total runtime of approximately forty-five minutes, So Long Little Miss Sunshine was preceded by Tuttle's 2023 album, City of Gold, which won Best Bluegrass Album at the 66th Annual Grammy Awards. The fifth track of the album is a cover of Swedish duo Icona Pop and British singer Charli XCX's multi-platinum-certified 2012 single, "I Love It".

It was produced by American singer-songwriter Jay Joyce, who recorded it with Tuttle and her bandmates at his Neon Cross studio in Nashville. It includes contributions from Old Crow Medicine Show vocalist and Tuttle's partner, Ketch Secor. The first single, "That's Gonna Leave a Mark", was released on June 3, 2025. It was followed by the second and third singles, "The Highway Knows" and "Old Me (New Wig)", on July 10 and July 31, 2025.

== Reception ==
Professional ratings
Review scores
| Source | Rating |
|---|---|
| AllMusic | 4/5 stars |
| Financial Times | 4/5 stars |
| PopMatters | 8/10 |

Writing for AllMusic, Mark Deming described So Long Little Miss Sunshine as "an acoustic musician's big pop move that fully succeeds without throwing away the virtues of their previous work."

PopMatters' Chris Conaton, rating the album eight out of ten, noted that the album is "not entirely bluegrass this time around" due to Tuttle "stretching her sound mildly and clearly enjoying the process," referring to it as "an excellent written, impeccably performed, highly entertaining album." Arwa Haider of Financial Times assigned a rating of four stars to the album and noted, "The material certainly nods to the country scene's progressively broader and more youth-centred reach, but it never feels like a forced detour."

Billboard's Jessica Nicholson commented that the album "marks a radical stylistic evolution from her earlier bluegrass-oriented work" and was "built on a bedrock of folk-pop, country and rock, while still folding in dashes of bluegrass." Andrew Sacher of BrooklynVegan remarked that it "doesn't abandon her roots, but it does welcome a bunch more stylistic influences for a lively album that won't be easy to pigeonhole."

== Track listing ==
So Long Little Miss Sunshine track listing
| No. | Title | Writer(s) | Length |
|---|---|---|---|
| 1. | "Everything Burns" | Molly Tuttle; Ketch Secor | 3:44 |
| 2. | "The Highway Knows" | Tuttle; Secor | 4:10 |
| 3. | "Golden State of Mind" | Tuttle; Secor | 4:09 |
| 4. | "Rosalee" | Tuttle; Trannie Anderson; Secor; Paul Sikes | 3:53 |
| 5. | "I Love It" | Charlotte Aitchison; Patrik Berger; Linus Eklow | 2:54 |
| 6. | "That's Gonna Leave a Mark" | Tuttle; Kevin Griffin | 3:37 |
| 7. | "Easy" | Tuttle; Griffin | 3:51 |
| 8. | "Summer of Love" | Tuttle; Secor | 4:48 |
| 9. | "Old Me (New Wig)" | Tuttle; Secor | 2:19 |
| 10. | "Oasis" | Tuttle; Secor | 3:57 |
| 11. | "No Regrets" | Tuttle; Griffin; Secor | 4:19 |
| 12. | "Story of My So-Called Life" | Tuttle; Secor | 3:55 |
| Total length: | | | 45:36 |

== Personnel ==
Credits adapted from Tidal.

- Molly Tuttle – vocals, acoustic guitar (all tracks); gang vocals (track 8), banjo (11, 12)
- Jay Joyce – production, mixing (all tracks); acoustic guitar (1–8, 10–12), programming (1–4, 7, 8, 10–12), Hammond B3 organ (1, 2, 4, 6, 7, 10, 11), bass (1, 2, 8, 10), bass synthesizer (1, 3, 12), electric guitar (1, 4, 5, 7, 8), Jupiter synthesizer (1), keyboards (2–8, 10–12), Fender Rhodes (2, 3, 7, 10, 11), Juno synthesizer (2, 4, 10, 12), piano (3, 11), djembe (3); bass drums, Wurlitzer piano (4); hand claps (6), drums (7, 10–12); bongo drums, fiddle (7); shaker (8, 12), gang vocals (8), Farfisa organ (9), cymbals (10), tambourine (12)
- Jason Hall – mixing, engineering (all tracks); gang vocals (8), background vocals (10)
- Andrew Mendelson – mastering
- Bobby Louden – recording, engineering assistance
- Jimmy Mansfield – mixing (5); recording, engineering assistance (all tracks)
- Court Blankenship – production coordination
- Ketch Secor – fiddle (1–5, 8, 9, 12), banjo (3, 5, 8), acoustic guitar (4, 6, 7, 10), background vocals (4, 8, 12), gang vocals (8), harmonica (9), mandolin (11)
- Fred Eltringham – drums (1, 2, 6, 8), tambourine (1, 6), hand claps (6)
- Byron House – upright bass (2–4, 8, 10–12), bass (6, 7, 9), hand claps (6)
- Jay Bellerose – drums (3, 9), shaker (7, 9–11), tambourine (10, 11)

== Charts ==
Chart performance for So Long Little Miss Sunshine
| Chart (2025) | Peak position |
|---|---|
| Scottish Albums (Official Charts) | 32 |
| UK Albums Sales (OCC) | 32 |
| UK Americana Albums (Official Charts) | 11 |
| US Bluegrass Albums (Billboard) | 1 |
| US Top Album Sales (Billboard) | 45 |
