= Paint This Town =

Studio album by Old Crow Medicine Show
- Released: April 22, 2022
- Studio: Hartland Studio, Nashville, Tennessee
- Genre: Folk; Americana
- Length: 42:55
- Label: ATO
- Producer: Old Crow Medicine Show; Matt Ross-Spang

Old Crow Medicine Show chronology
Volunteer (2018)	Paint This Town (2022)	Jubilee (2023)

Singles from Paint This Town
- 1. "Paint This Town" Released: December 8, 2021; 2. "Bombs Away" Released: January 25, 2022; 3. "Honey Chile" Released: March 14, 2022; 4. "Gloryland" Released: April 12, 2022

Paint This Town is the seventh studio album by old-time folk band Old Crow Medicine Show. Conceptually, the album aimed to shine a light on the darker aspects of the American experience, with character-driven songs underpinned by the band's vision for a more harmonious future. Released on April 22, 2022, via ATO Records, it marked their return to the label which released 2012's Carry Me Back and 2014's Remedy. It was preceded by the singles "Paint This Town", "Bombs Away", "Honey Chile" and "Gloryland".

It is their first album following the departure of Chris "Critter" Fuqua, leaving bandleader Ketch Secor as the sole remaining founding member of the group, though Fuqua is still credited as a writer on two of the album's twelve tracks. It is also the band's first album to feature Mike Harris, Mason Via and Jerry Pentecost, who became their first permanent drummer.

== Background ==
The album was recorded at Old Crow's Hartland studios in East Nashville. Discussing the journey of the band since the release of their previous album, Volunteer in 2018, frontman Ketch Secor stated that the addition of Jerry Pentecost as their first dedicated drummer was instrumental in redefining their sound. In an interview with The Tennessean, Secor explained that “things had changed a lot. We broke up with our longtime manager. We lost Critter, who was our longtime banjo player. There was an opportunity to do two things: Placate the crowd and the team and just keep on doin' it. Maybe switch to casinos, that kinda thing, or reinvent it, reinvigorate it. And that decision coincided with callin' Jerry.” Praising Pentecost's contribution to the album, Secor noted that “he brought a full head of steam to the locomotive and it just kept goin' down the tracks”, while Pentecost expressed that bringing full-time percussion to the band allowed him to carve out a unique position in the history and sound of Old Crow.

=== Singles ===
The album's lead single and title track was released on December 8, 2021. Written by Secor and Jim Lauderdale, it was inspired by their teenage experiences of living in a small town and rebelling against the confines of that lifestyle.

"Bombs Away", which features Molly Tuttle, was released as the second single on January 25, 2022. The song was a solo composition by Secor, who wrote it following the dissolution of his marriage while he was working as an artist in residence at Sewanee: The University of the South and was inspired by the optimistic energy of the students there. Secor enjoyed the contrast between the upbeat instrumentation and the lyrical content, describing it as “first and foremost, a song about divorce” but one that is “brimming with the euphoria of new beginnings, a tongue-in-cheek tale of throwing caution to the wind and starting over.”

The album's third single, "Honey Chile", was released on March 14, 2022, and was inspired by country singer Charlie Daniels. Discussing his influence on the track, Secor explained that “when you mine the musical traditions of the South as we have you’re always going to run head-on into the region’s most successful export: Southern Rock, and my favorite performers of this style are the Charlie Daniels Band, who Old Crow was lucky enough to open for back in the early 2000’s. We’ll miss Charlie around these parts, but he lives on in songs like ‘Honey Chile,’ a backwoods slow burn about good lovin’ and other hard habits to break.”

"Gloryland" was released ten days before its parent album on April 12, 2022. Secor described the track as song inspired by his fears over the state of the world and a hypothetical scenario where he attempts to escape but the gates to Eden are closed so he resorts to singing to make him feel better and give him purpose. He stated that he wrote the song because he "didn't know what the hell else to do".

== Track listing ==
Paint This Town track listing
No.	Title	Writer(s)	Lead vocal	Length
1.	"Paint This Town"	Jim Lauderdale, Ketch Secor	Ketch Secor	3:57
2.	"Bombs Away"	Secor	Secor	2:41
3.	"Gloryland"	Critter Fuqua, Secor	Secor	4:12
4.	"Lord Willing and the Creek Don't Rise"	Secor, Willie Watson, Jason White	Cory Younts, Mason Via	2:41
5.	"Honey Chile"	Joe Andrews, Secor	Secor	3:49
6.	"Reasons to Run"	Secor	Secor	4:35
7.	"Painkiller"	Lauderdale, Secor	Secor	3:23
8.	"Used to Be a Mountain"	Trey Hensley, Secor	Secor	3:17
9.	"DeFord Rides Again"	Secor, Jerry Pentecost, Molly Tuttle	Jerry Pentecost	3:20
10.	"New Mississippi Flag"	Secor	Secor	3:01
11.	"John Brown's Dream"	Secor	Secor	3:26
12.	"Hillbilly Boy"	Fuqua, Secor, Cory Younts	Younts	4:33

== Personnel ==
Credits adapted from AllMusic.

Old Crow Medicine Show

- Mike Harris – banjo, guitar, shaker, trumpet, vocals
- Morgan Jahnig – bass, sax, vocals
- Ketch Secor – banjo, guitar, fiddle, harmonica, harp, piano, sax, vocals
- Jerry Pentecost – drums, mandolin, percussion, tambourine, vocals
- Mason Via – banjo, guitar, mandolin, shaker, trombone, ukulele, vocals
- Cory Younts – didgeridoo, guitar, harmonica, mandolin, organ, piano, shaker, vocals

Additional

- Jeff Crawford – jug
- Michael Criswell – photography
- Aaron Draplin – graphic design
- Pete Lyman – mastering
- Matt Ross-Spang – engineering, mixing, production
- Shardé Thomas – fife
- Molly Tuttle – banjo, backing vocals
- Sally Williams – executive producer

== Charts ==
Chart performance for Paint This Town
Chart (2022)	Peak position
US Top Bluegrass Albums (Billboard)	1
