= Crooked Tree (album) =

Studio album by Molly Tuttle
- Released: April 1, 2022
- Studios: Oceanway Studios, Nashville, Tennessee
- Genre: Bluegrass
- Length: 42:27
- Label: Nonesuch
- Producers: Jerry Douglas, Molly Tuttle

Molly Tuttle chronology
But I'd Rather Be with You (2020)	Crooked Tree (2022)	City of Gold (2023)

Singles from Crooked Tree
- 1. "She'll Change" Released: November 17, 2021

Crooked Tree is the third studio album by American bluegrass singer and musician Molly Tuttle. Released on April 1, 2022, it is Tuttle's first album for Nonesuch Records and the first to feature her band Golden Highway, who receive star billing. The album was co-produced by Tuttle and dobro player Jerry Douglas and includes collaborations with Margo Price, Billy Strings, Old Crow Medicine Show, Sierra Hull, Dan Tyminski, and Gillian Welch. It was preceded by the single "She'll Change", which was released on November 17, 2021.

The album received positive reviews from critics and won the Grammy Award for Best Bluegrass Album at the 65th Annual Grammy Awards and also contributed towards Tuttle being nominated for the all-genre Grammy Award for Best New Artist. Tuttle also received five nominations at the 2022 International Bluegrass Music Awards based on the strength of the album, winning Female Vocalist of the Year. In addition, it won Album of the Year at the 2023 International Folk Music Awards.

== Background ==
The album was announced on January 20, 2022. It was recorded live at Oceanway Studios in Nashville, Tennessee, and was inspired by Tuttle's father, a music teacher and multi-instrumentalist who provides backing vocals on the closing track, and her grandfather, a banjo player. Of the album's creation, Tuttle stated: "Once I started writing, everything flowed so easily; sometimes I've felt an internal pressure to come up with a sound no one's heard before, but this time my intention was just to make an album that reflected the music that's been passed down through generations in my family. I found a way to do that while writing songs that feel true to who I am, and it really helped me to grow as a songwriter."

Margo Price was chosen to appear on the track "Flatland Girl" because Tuttle and she had a similar childhood, having both grown up on farms. Tuttle wanted a "Midwestern girl" to accompany her on the song and learned about Price's family farm after reading an interview. Old Crow Medicine Show features on the song "Big Backyard", which marks the second time Tuttle has collaborated with the band after frontman Ketch Secor appeared on "Olympia, WA", a song on her previous album. Tuttle and Secor co-wrote the song together and she explained, "We wrote it with them in mind, and then reworked the lyrics to make it fit my voice". In a press release about the song, Tuttle explained that it was inspired by Woody Guthrie, noting "I wish that Woody Guthrie were still around. I'd love to hear the songs he would write about the crazy world we're living in today. But since he's not, Ketch Secor and I wrote the best Woody Guthrie song we could think of." Regarding the album's title track, Tuttle explained: "I wrote that song with my friend Melody Walker. We had seen a quote by Tom Waits. It kind of said like, when they chop down the trees in a forest, the crooked trees are the ones left standing."

Tuttle and Golden Highway promoted the album by performing "Crooked Tree", "She'll Change", and "Over the Line" on CBS Saturday Morning on April 9, 2022.

The deluxe version of the album, released on December 2, 2022, featured four bonus tracks - a cover of "Dire Wolf" by Grateful Dead, a rendition of the traditional folk song "Cold Rain and Snow", and live versions of "Dooley's Farm" featuring Jerry Douglas and "Castelleja", both recorded at Nashville's Station Inn.

== Critical reception ==
At Metacritic, which assigns a normalized rating out of 100 to reviews from mainstream critics, the album has an average score of 80, based on six reviews, indicating "generally favorable reviews". It received a four-star review from Neil Spencer at The Guardian, who stated that the album "looks destined to establish [Tuttle] with a wider audience" and praised the "heavyweight" guests such as Douglas, Welch, and Old Crow, the "phenomenal" musicianship from Tuttle and the band, and the "modern" interpretation of bluegrass.

== Track listing ==
Crooked Tree track listing
No.	Title	Writer(s)	Length
1.	"She'll Change"	Ketch Secor; Molly Tuttle	2:41
2.	"Flatland Girl" (featuring Margo Price)	Secor; Tuttle	2:35
3.	"Dooley's Farm" (featuring Billy Strings)	Secor; Tuttle	3:41
4.	"Big Backyard" (featuring Old Crow Medicine Show)	Secor; Tuttle	3:17
5.	"Crooked Tree"	Tuttle; Melody Walker	3:52
6.	"Castilleja"	Secor; Tuttle	3:16
7.	"The River Knows"	Tuttle; Walker	3:33
8.	"Over the Line" (featuring Sierra Hull)	Steve Poltz; Secor; Tuttle	3:01
9.	"Nashville Mess Around"	Secor; Tuttle	2:32
10.	"San Francisco Blues" (featuring Dan Tyminski)	Secor; Tuttle; Walker	4:04
11.	"Goodbye Girl"	Becky Buller; Tuttle	3:21
12.	"Side Saddle" (featuring Gillian Welch)	Tuttle; Walker	2:44
13.	"Grass Valley"	Mark Simos; Tuttle	3:50
Total length:			42:27

Deluxe edition bonus tracks
No.	Title	Writer(s)	Length
14.	"Cold Rain and Snow"	Traditional	4:24
15.	"Dire Wolf"	Jerry Garcia; Robert Hunter	3:32
16.	"Dooley's Farm" (live, featuring Jerry Douglas)	Secor; Tuttle	4:35
17.	"Castilleja" (live)	Secor; Tuttle	6:47
Total length:			60:65

== Personnel ==
Credits adapted from AllMusic.

- Molly Tuttle – lead vocals, backing vocals, guitar, production

Golden Highway

- Bronwyn Keith-Hynes – fiddle
- Dominick Leslie – mandolin
- Shelby Means – bass
- Kyle Tuttle – banjo

Other musicians

- Tina Adair – backing vocals
- Darol Anger – fiddle
- Ron Block – banjo, guitar, backing vocals
- Mike Bub – upright bass
- Jason Carter – fiddle
- Jerry Douglas – dobro, backing vocals, production
- Mike Harris – banjo
- Sierra Hull – vocals, mandolin
- Morgan Jahnig – upright bass
- Viktor Krauss – upright bass
- Lindsay Lou - backing vocals
- Old Crow Medicine Show – backing vocals, various instruments
- Jerry Pentecost – drums, backing vocals
- Todd Phillips – upright bass
- Margo Price – vocals
- Christian Sedelmyer – fiddle
- Billy Strings – vocals, guitar
- Jack Tuttle – vocals
- Dan Tyminski – vocals
- Mason Via – guitjo, mandolin, backing vocals
- Melody Walker – backing vocals
- Gillian Welch – vocals
- Cory Younts – harmonica

== Charts ==
Chart performance for Crooked Tree
Chart (2022)	Peak position
Scottish Albums (Official Charts)	46
UK Album Downloads (Official Charts)	38
UK Americana Albums (Official Charts)	3
UK Country Albums (Official Charts)	5
US Heatseekers Albums (Billboard)	12
US Top Bluegrass Albums (Billboard)	2
