= Lydia Peelle =

American fiction writer

- Born: Lydia Child Peelle; August 31, 1978; Boston
- Education: University of Virginia, Phillips Exeter Academy, Cornell University
- Occupations: Short story writer, novelist, speechwriter, teacher
- Employer: Southern New Hampshire University (2012–)
- Spouse: Ketch Secor
- Awards: National Book Foundation (short-story collection, 2009); Whiting Awards (short-story collection, 2010)

Lydia Peelle is an American fiction writer. In 2009 the National Book Foundation named her a "5 under 35" Honoree.

== Early life ==
Peelle grew up in Massachusetts and attended a boarding school in New Hampshire before her college years.

== Career ==
Before her writing career, Peelle worked as a speechwriter for Governor Phil Bredesen of Tennessee. She has also worked as a wildlife rehabilitator and an English teacher. She received a creative writing MFA from the University of Virginia and has been a fellow at the Fine Arts Work Center in Provincetown, and at the Ucross Foundation, Yaddo, and the Ragdale Foundation. Since 2012 she has taught in the MFA program at Southern New Hampshire University. Her short fiction has appeared in Granta, The Sun, Orion, Prairie Schooner, and elsewhere.

== Awards ==
- Two Pushcart Prizes
- O. Henry Prize for "Mule Killers" (2006)
- 2009 National Book Foundation 5 under 35 honoree for fiction
- 2010 Whiting Award for Fiction, worth $50,000
- 2010 PEN/Hemingway Award runner-up
- 2012 Anahid Literary Prize for emerging Armenian-American writers

The short story "Mule Killers" was published in The O. Henry Prize Stories 2006 as judged by Kevin Brockmeier, Francine Prose, and Colm Tóibín, and edited by Laura Furman.

== Works ==
- The Midnight Cool. Harper Perennial. 2017. ISBN 978-0-06247-546-6.
- Reasons for and Advantages of Breathing. Harper Perennial. 2009. ISBN 978-0-06172-473-2.
  - "Phantom Pain," Originally published in Granta 102: The New Nature Writing, Summer 2008
  - "Reasons for and Advantages of Breathing," Originally published in One Story, Issue 87, January 2007

Peelle's novel The Midnight Cool, set in Tennessee in 1916, follows two horse traders who turn to trading mules for the U.S. war effort in Europe. Her debut story collection, Reasons for and Advantages of Breathing, was a New York Times Book Review Editors' Choice book and a finalist for the Orion Book Award, in addition to receiving an honorable mention for the PEN/Hemingway Award.

== Personal ==
Peelle was named for her great-great-aunt, abolitionist Lydia Maria Child. She married musician and bandleader Ketch Secor in 2001, in North Andover, Massachusetts. They have two children, a daughter and a son, and divorced in 2018. Peelle lives in Nashville, Tennessee.
