= Bronwyn Keith-Hynes =

American bluegrass musician

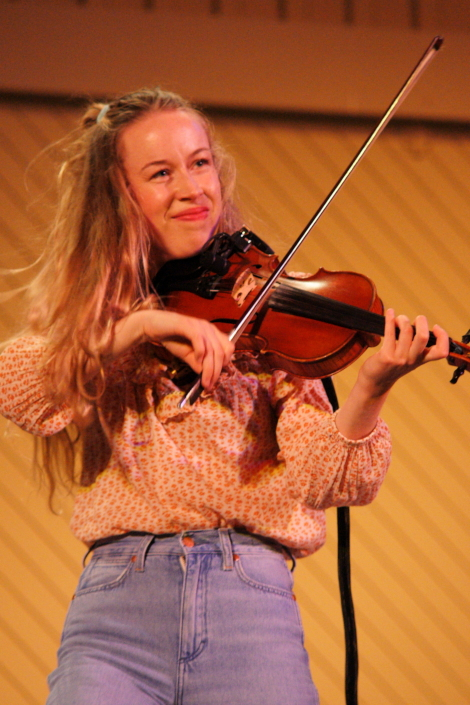
- Keith-Hynes with Molly Tuttle & Golden Highway in Galax VA

Background information
- Genre: Bluegrass
- Occupations: Fiddler, Vocalist
- Instrument: Fiddle
- Years active: 2019–present
- Website: www.bronwynkeithhynes.com

Bronwyn Keith-Hynes (also Bronwyn) is an American fiddle player. She is a Grammy winner and three-time International Bluegrass Music Association award recipient.

== Early life and family ==
Keith-Hynes started playing fiddle when she was 3, initially playing Celtic music before turning to bluegrass in her teens.

Keith-Hynes is married to long-time Del McCoury Band fiddler Jason Carter.

== Career ==
Keith-Hynes co-founded Boston bluegrass band Mile Twelve, leaving in 2021. She started playing with Molly Tuttle & Golden Highway in 2021, departing the band in 2025.

She has co-written songs with collaborators such as Tuttle's co-writer Melody Walker and Sierra Ferrell. She and Pat McLaughlin co-wrote many songs for her 2026 album Rattlin' Bones.

== Awards ==
Keith-Hynes is a two-time winner of the International Bluegrass Music Association best fiddle player award, winning in 2021 and 2022. In 2023 she received Bluegrass Album of the Year for her work with Molly Tuttle & Golden Highway on the album Crooked Tree. She received a Grammy award in 2024 for her work on Tuttle's album City of Gold. She also earned a Grammy nomination in 2025 for her solo album I Built a World.

== Discography ==
Solo recordings

- Fiddlers Pastime (2020)
- I Built a World (2024)
- Rattlin' Bones (2026)

With Molly Tuttle & Golden Highway

- Crooked Tree (2022)
- City of Gold (2023)

With Mile Twelve

- Onwards (2017)
- City on a Hill (2019)
