= Korby Lenker =

American singer-songwriter

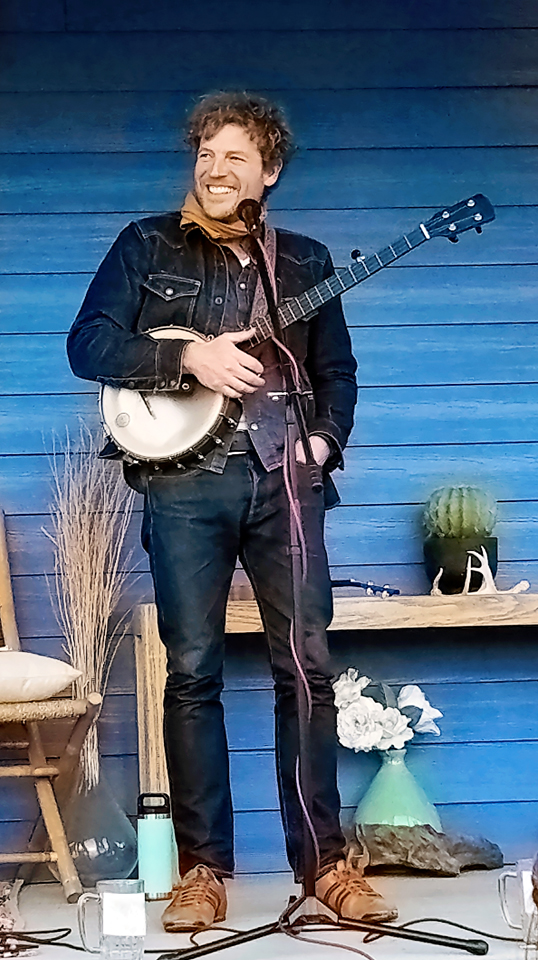
- Born: May 1976 (age 49); Twin Falls, Idaho
- Occupations: Singer-songwriter; Author; Actor
- Spouse: Randa Newman (married 2021–present)
- Website: korbylenker.com

Korby Lenker is an American folk and Americana singer-songwriter, writer, and actor. He is known for his album Thousand Springs and his book of short stories, Medium Hero. The son of a mortician and a school teacher, Lenker was born in 1976 in Twin Falls, Idaho, and now resides in Nashville, Tennessee.

== Music career ==
As a high school student in Twin Falls, Idaho, Lenker fronted the alt-rock band Clockwork Orange. In 2001, he relocated to Bellingham, Washington, where he founded the alt-bluegrass band The Barbed Wire Cutters while attending Western Washington University. The band released two albums, the self-titled The Barbed Wire Cutters (2002) and Full Moon to Rise (2003). While still touring with The Barbed Wire Cutters, Lenker began recording solo work, including the albums First Takes (2001), The Ghost of Whiteboy (2002) and Bellingham (2003). Lenker then moved to Seattle, Washington, to continue his solo career, before relocating to Nashville in 2007. In 2017, he released Thousand Springs. The album was recorded outside the recording studio at locations that held special meaning to Lenker, from his favorite bookstore to his father's mortuary. His album Man in the Maroon was released May 21, 2021, on GrindEthos Records.

== Discography ==
Year of Publication	Title of Record	Label
2001	First Takes	Blue Light Records
2002	The Ghost of Whiteboy	Blue Light Records
2003	Bellingham	Singular Recordings
2007	King of Hearts	Singular Recordings
2014	Korby Lenker	Stuffed Piranha Records
2017	Thousand Springs	Soundly Music
2021	Man in the Maroon	GrindEthos Records

== Medium Hero ==
Lenker's first book Medium Hero: And Other Stories is a collection of twenty-seven short stories inspired by Lenker's years as a touring indie artist. The original version was self-published. Turner Publishing acquisitions manager Stephanie Beard picked up the book at one of his performances. As a result, Turner Publishing offered Lenker a contract and consequently published the book on December 1, 2015.

== Morse Code ==
In 2018, Lenker launched the web series Morse Code about a struggling musician trying to balance his personal and professional life. It was produced in part by funds raised in a Patreon campaign. The pilot episode "Boomerang," which was written by and stars Lenker, released to the public on August 3, 2018, on Vimeo. Morse Code was then adapted into an award winning television pilot co-starring Savannah Welch. It also inspired the eponymous podcast about life as a creative featuring musicians, writers, and other artists.

== Collaborations ==
In 2004, Lenker collaborated with Stell Newsome (performing together as David Goliath) to produce an album of bluegrass gospel standards called David Goliath's Old Time Gospel Hour. He co-wrote the song "Friend and a Friend" with Grammy winner Molly Tuttle. The song was consequently released on Lenker's album Thousand Springs and Tuttle's album Rise in 2017. In 2017, he co-wrote the song "Let's Just Have Supper" with Nora Jane Struthers. The song and its accompanying music video premiered on NPR.

== Awards ==
In 2006, Lenker won second place in the country category during the Chris Austin Songwriting Contest at MerleFest with his song "Handful of Dice." In 2007, Lenker took first place in the Chris Austin Songwriting Contest in the gospel category with his song "Blessed Be That Day." " In 2016, he won first place at the Rocky Mountain Folks Festival Songwriters' Showcase. Lenker won first place in the 2023 Al Johnson Performing Songwriter Contest.

Morse Code won the Best Short Feature Audience Award at the Berlin Short Film Festival in 2023. Lenker was awarded Best Actor Leading Role in a TV Pilot for his work in Morse Code during the NYC TV Festival 2023.

== Music videos ==
Year	Video
2012	"My Little Life"
2014	"If I Prove False to You"
2014	"Forbidden Fruit"
2017	"Let's Just have Supper"
2017	"Northern Lights"
2018	"Book Nerd"
2021	"Crow Country"
