= Molly Tuttle =

American musician

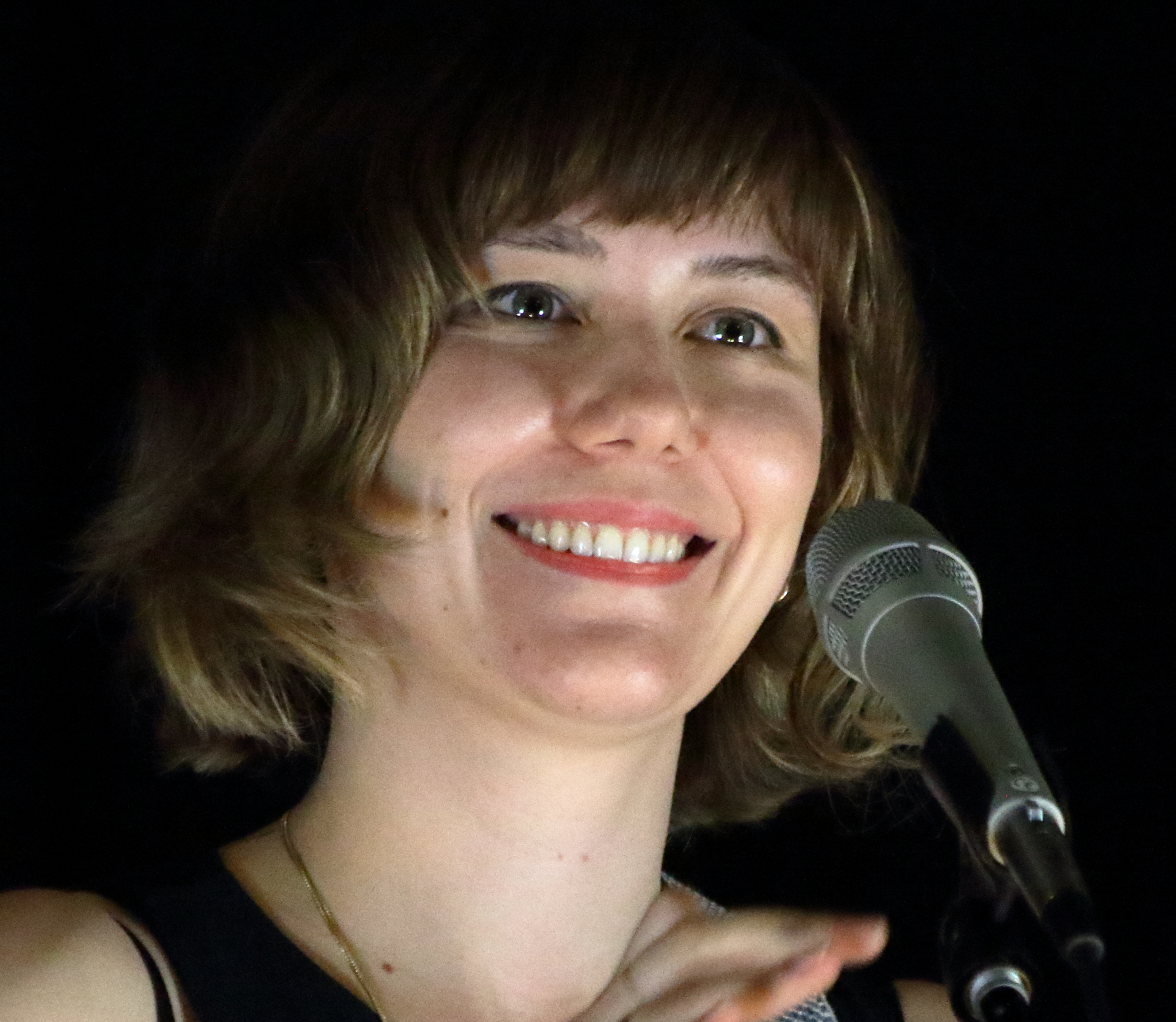
- Tuttle in 2018

Background information
- Born: Molly Rose Tuttle; January 14, 1993 (age 33); Santa Clara, California, U.S.
- Origin: Palo Alto, California, U.S.
- Genres: Bluegrass; Americana; country; folk
- Occupations: Singer; songwriter; musician
- Instruments: Vocals; guitar; banjo
- Years active: 2006–present
- Labels: Compass; Nonesuch
- Partner(s): Ketch Secor (2023–present; m. 2026)
- Website: mollytuttlemusic.com

Molly Rose Tuttle (born January 14, 1993) is an American vocalist, songwriter, guitarist, banjo player, recording artist, and teacher in the bluegrass tradition. She is noted for her flatpicking, clawhammer, and crosspicking guitar style. She has cited Laurie Lewis, Kathy Kallick, Alison Krauss, and Hazel Dickens as role models. In 2017, Tuttle was the first woman to win the International Bluegrass Music Association's Guitar Player of the Year award. In 2018, she won the award again, and was named the Americana Music Association's Instrumentalist of the Year. In 2023, Tuttle won the Best Bluegrass Album for Crooked Tree and also received a nomination for the all-genre Best New Artist award at the 65th Annual Grammy Awards. In 2023, Tuttle and Golden Highway won International Bluegrass Music Awards for their album Crooked Tree and for the title track, in the categories of Album of the Year and Song of the Year. Tuttle was Female Vocalist of the Year.

== Biography ==
=== Early career ===
Tuttle was born in Santa Clara, California, and raised in Palo Alto. She began playing guitar at age eight. At age 11 she played onstage with her father Jack Tuttle, a bluegrass multi-instrumentalist and instructor. At age 15, she joined her family band The Tuttles with AJ Lee. Her siblings Sullivan (guitar) and Michael (mandolin), and mandolist AJ Lee were also in the band.

In 2006, at age 13, Tuttle recorded The Old Apple Tree with her father, an album of duets. She graduated from Palo Alto High School in 2011. In 2011, the Tuttles self-released their Introducing the Tuttles album, and the Endless Ocean album in 2013.

In 2012, Tuttle was awarded merit scholarships to the Berklee College of Music for music and composition. She received the Foundation for Bluegrass Music's first Hazel Dickens Memorial Scholarship, won the Chris Austin Songwriting Competition at the Merlefest Music Festival, and appeared with her father on A Prairie Home Companion.

=== Collaborations ===
While studying at the Berklee College of Music in 2014, Tuttle met and joined the all-female bluegrass group the Goodbye Girls which combined bluegrass, jazz, and Swedish folk music. Other members were Allison de Groot (banjo), Lena Jonsson (fiddle), and Brittany Karlson (bass). The group released an EP Going to Boston in 2014 and the album Snowy Side of the Mountain in 2016, and toured Jonsson's home country of Sweden several times. Tuttle also recorded Molly Tuttle & John Mailander, a duet EP with fiddler John Mailander.

In 2018, she joined Alison Brown, Missy Raines, Sierra Hull, and Becky Buller in a supergroup. The quintet performed at the Rockygrass Festival in Lyons, Colorado, on July 27, 2018. Initially known as the Julia Belles, the group became known as the First Ladies of Bluegrass. Additional gigs were played at Analog at the Hutton Hotel in Nashville on September 18, 2018, and the International Bluegrass Music Association Wide Open Bluegrass Festival on September 28, 2018. Tuttle collaborated with Billy Strings on the songs "Sittin' on Top of the World" and "Billy in the Lowground." The First Ladies of Bluegrass were featured on the first single from a full-length album by Missy Raines, titled Royal Traveler, released in 2018 on Compass Records.

=== Solo career ===
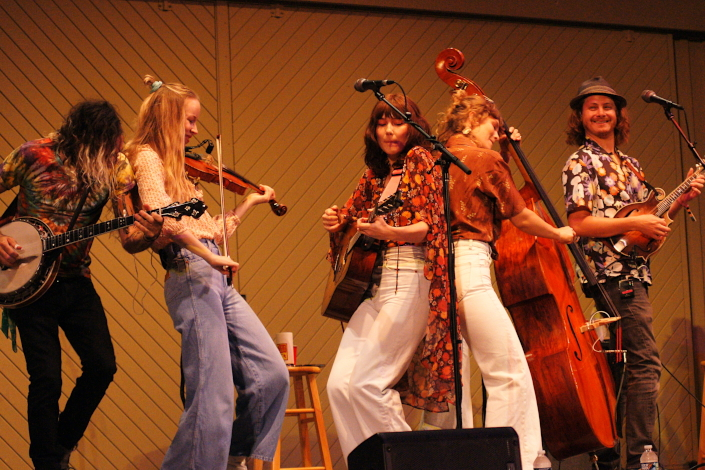
Molly Tuttle and Golden Highway on tour at the Blue Ridge Music Center in Galax, Virginia, on September 3, 2022

In 2015, Tuttle moved from Boston to Nashville. Her EP Rise was released in 2017 after a crowdfunding campaign. She wrote all of the songs on the seven-song album, which was produced by Kai Welch. Guests included Darrell Scott, the Milk Carton Kids, Kathy Kallick, and Nathaniel Smith. She formed the Molly Tuttle Band, which included Wes Corbett (banjo), Joe K. Walsh (mandolin), and Hasee Ciaccio (bass). Tuttle was selected by Buddy Miller to join his "Cavalcade of Stars" section of Hardly Strictly Bluegrass on the Rooster Stage on October 6, 2018.

In 2017, Tuttle signed with Alison Brown's Compass Records. She released her debut album When You're Ready via Compass Records on April 5, 2019, and But I'd Rather Be with You again on Compass Records in August 2020.

=== Golden Highway ===
In 2021, Tuttle assembled her new "dream" band, Golden Highway, including Shelby Means on bass, Kyle Tuttle on banjo, Bronwyn Keith-Hynes on fiddle, and Dominick Leslie on mandolin, with everyone sharing or supporting vocals. In January 2022, Nonesuch Records announced a release by Molly Tuttle and Golden Highway titled Crooked Tree on April 1, 2022. Their follow-up album, City of Gold, was released in July 2023. Both won the Grammy Award for Best Bluegrass Album.

=== New band ===
Tuttle announced the dissolution of Golden Highway in May 2025, with many band members pursuing solo careers, and revealed a new, all-female band that would begin touring with her in July. Her new album, So Long Little Miss Sunshine, was set for release on August 15, 2025. The project was produced by Jay Joyce and preceded by the single "That's Gonna Leave a Mark".

== Personal life ==
Tuttle was diagnosed with alopecia areata when she was three years old, which quickly progressed to alopecia universalis, resulting in total body hair loss. Tuttle has been in a relationship with Ketch Secor of Old Crow Medicine Show since 2023, and married on August 22, 2026 in Santa Cruz, California.

== Discography ==
=== Solo albums ===
Title	Album details	Peak chart positions			Sales
Title	Album details	US Heat	US Indie	US Bluegrass	Sales
When You're Ready	Released: April 5, 2019; Label: Compass; Formats: CD, vinyl, digital download, streaming	5	11	—	US: 5,900
But I'd Rather Be with You	Released: August 28, 2020; Label: Compass; Formats: CD, vinyl, digital download, streaming	—	—	—	
Crooked Tree	Released: April 1, 2022; Label: Nonesuch; Formats: CD, vinyl, digital download, streaming	12	—	1	
City of Gold	Released: July 21, 2023; Label: Nonesuch; Formats: CD, vinyl, digital download, streaming	22	—	1	
So Long Little Miss Sunshine	Released: August 15, 2025; Label: Nonesuch; Formats: CD, vinyl, digital download, streaming	—	—	1	
"—" denotes releases that did not chart

=== Extended plays ===
Title	Album details	Peak chart positions			Sales
Title	Album details	US Heat	US Indie	US Bluegrass	Sales
Rise	Release date: October 13, 2017; Label: Compass; Formats: CD, digital download	18	47	2	

=== The Goodbye Girls ===
- 2014: Going to Boston (self-released)
- 2016: Snowy Side of the Mountain (self-released)

=== Molly Tuttle and John Mailander ===
- 2014: Molly Tuttle and John Mailander EP (Back Studio)

=== The Tuttles With AJ Lee ===
- 2012: Introducing the Tuttles with AJ Lee (self-released)
- 2013: Endless Ocean (self-released)

=== Molly and Jack Tuttle ===
- 2007: The Old Apple Tree (Back Studio)

=== Singles ===
Title	Year	Peak chart positions	Album
Title	Year	US AAA	Album
"That's Gonna Leave a Mark"	2025	13	So Long Little Miss Sunshine
"The Highway Knows"	2025	35	So Long Little Miss Sunshine

=== As a featured artist ===
- 2015: Mile Rocks - Mile Rocks and Friends (Audio and Video Labs)
- 2017: AJ Lee - AJ Lee (self-released)
- 2017: Korby Lenker - Thousand Springs (Relativity)
- 2017: Bobby Osborne - Original (Compass)
- 2017: Billy Strings - Turmoil & Tinfoil (Apostol)
- 2019: Old Crow Medicine Show - "Live at the Ryman" (Columbia)
- 2021: Béla Fleck - "My Bluegrass Heart" (Renew)
- 2024: Orville Peck - "Papa Was a Rodeo"
- 2025: Ringo Starr - "I Live for Your Love"
- 2025: Ringo Starr - "Look Up"
- 2025: Ringo Starr - "Can You Hear Me Call"

== Awards and nominations ==
Year	Association	Category	Nominated work	Result	Ref
2016	International Bluegrass Music Awards	Momentum Award	Herself	Won	
2017	International Bluegrass Music Awards	Guitar Player of the Year	Herself	Won	
2018	International Folk Music Awards	Song of the Year	"You Didn't Call My Name"	Won	
2018	Americana Music Honors & Awards	Instrumentalist of the Year	Herself	Won	
2018	International Bluegrass Music Awards	Emerging Artist of the Year	Herself	Nominated	
2018	International Bluegrass Music Awards	Guitar Player of the Year	Herself	Won	
2018	International Bluegrass Music Awards	Female Vocalist of the Year	Herself	Nominated	
2018	International Bluegrass Music Awards	Album of the Year	Rise	Nominated	
2018	International Bluegrass Music Awards	Song of the Year	"You Didn't Call My Name"	Nominated	
2018	International Bluegrass Music Awards	Recorded Event of the Year	"Swept Away"^{[A]}	Won	
2019	International Bluegrass Music Awards	Female Vocalist of the Year	Herself	Nominated	
2019	International Bluegrass Music Awards	Guitar Player of the Year	Herself	Nominated	
2019	International Bluegrass Music Awards	Song of the Year	"Take the Journey"^{[B]}	Nominated	
2019	International Bluegrass Music Awards	Collaborative Recording Of The Year	"Soldiers Joy/Ragtime Annie"^{[C]}	Nominated	
2020	International Bluegrass Music Awards	Female Vocalist of the Year	Herself	Nominated	
2020	International Bluegrass Music Awards	Guitar Player of the Year	Herself	Nominated	
2021	International Bluegrass Music Awards	Female Vocalist of the Year	Herself	Nominated	
2021	International Bluegrass Music Awards	Guitar Player of the Year	Herself	Nominated	
2022	International Bluegrass Music Awards	Entertainer of the Year	Molly Tuttle & Golden Highway	Nominated	
2022	International Bluegrass Music Awards	Instrumental Group of the Year	Molly Tuttle & Golden Highway	Nominated	
2022	International Bluegrass Music Awards	Female Vocalist of the Year	Herself	Won	
2022	International Bluegrass Music Awards	Guitar Player of the Year	Herself	Nominated	
2022	International Bluegrass Music Awards	Album of the Year	Crooked Tree	Nominated	
2023	Grammy Awards	Best New Artist	Herself	Nominated	
2023	Grammy Awards	Best Bluegrass Album	Crooked Tree	Won	
2023	International Folk Music Awards	Album of the Year	Crooked Tree	Won	
2023	International Bluegrass Music Awards	Entertainer of the Year	Molly Tuttle & Golden Highway	Nominated	
2023	International Bluegrass Music Awards	Instrumental Group of the Year	Molly Tuttle & Golden Highway	Nominated	
2023	International Bluegrass Music Awards	Song of the Year	"Crooked Tree"	Won	
2023	International Bluegrass Music Awards	Album of the Year	Crooked Tree	Won	
2023	International Bluegrass Music Awards	Collaborative Recording of the Year	"From My Mountain (Calling You)"^{[D]}	Nominated	
2023	International Bluegrass Music Awards	Female Vocalist of the Year	Herself	Won	
2023	International Bluegrass Music Awards	Guitar Player of the Year	Herself	Nominated	
2024	Grammy Awards	Best Bluegrass Album	City of Gold	Won	
2026	Grammy Awards	Best Americana Album	So Long Little Miss Sunshine	Nominated	
2026	Grammy Awards	Best Americana Performance	"That's Gonna Leave a Mark"	Nominated	

A. with Missy Raines, Alison Brown, Becky Buller and Sierra Hull
B. Molly Tuttle (artist), Molly Tuttle/Sarah Siskind (writer)
C. with Roland White, Justin Hiltner, Jon Weisberger and Patrick McAvinue
D. with Peter Rowan and Lindsay Lou
