= Ketch Secor =

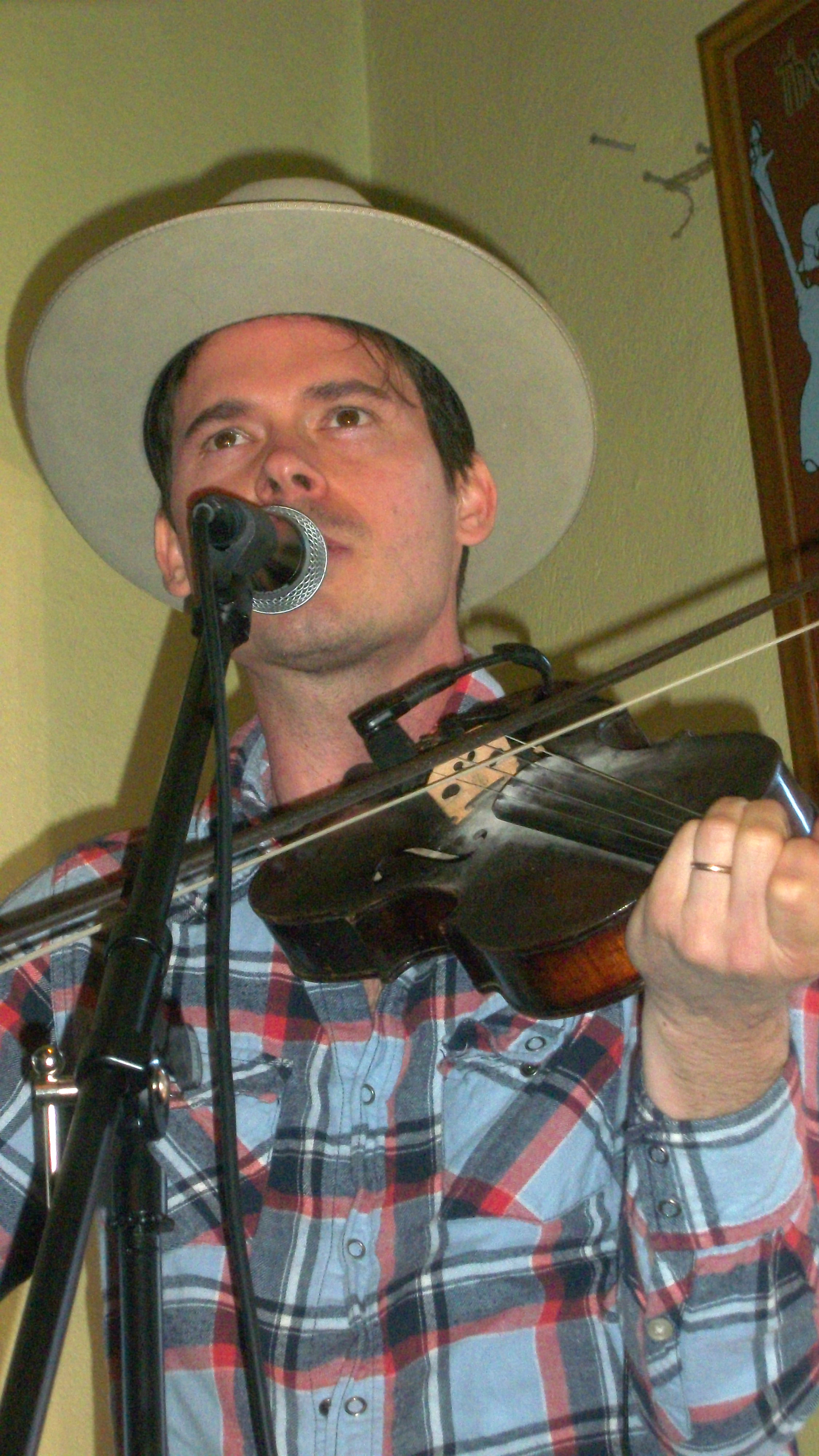
- Secor performing in 2012

Background information
- Born: Jay Ketcham Miller Secor; May 14, 1978 (age 48); Denville Township, New Jersey, U.S.
- Genres: Alternative country; Americana; bluegrass; old time
- Instruments: Fiddle, banjo, harmonica, guitar, vocals
- Years active: 1990–present
- Member of: Old Crow Medicine Show
- Formerly of: Route 11 Boys
- Spouses: Lydia Peelle (m. 2001; div. 2018); Molly Tuttle (m. 2026)
- Website: https://www.ketchsecor.com

Jay Ketcham Miller "Ketch" Secor (born May 14, 1978) is an American musician and a co-founder and current frontman for the band Old Crow Medicine Show. He is the only member of the band who has remained since its inception. Secor is a multi-instrumentalist, playing fiddle, banjo, harmonica, guitar and other instruments, and is known for infusing old-time Americana and Appalachian music with more modern punk influences.

== Early life ==
Secor was born in Denville Township, New Jersey, to Trina and James Jay Secor III, an Episcopal school headmaster. He grew up in Harrisonburg, Virginia. Earlier generations of the Secor family had achieved success in banking and business in Toledo, Ohio, but lost much of their fortune in the stock market crash of 1929.

Secor attended New Hampshire's prestigious Phillips Exeter Academy, where he learned to play banjo and discovered the music of Jerry Garcia and Bob Dylan. His first musical instrument was a mouth harp purchased on a field trip when he was in the fourth grade. In the seventh grade, Secor met future bandmate Christopher "Critter" Fuqua. Secor and Fuqua began playing music together, performing open mics at the Little Grill diner in Harrisonburg, where they met Robert St. Ours, founder of The Hackensaw Boys. Secor and St. Ours joined to form the Route 11 Boys.

== Old Crow Medicine Show ==
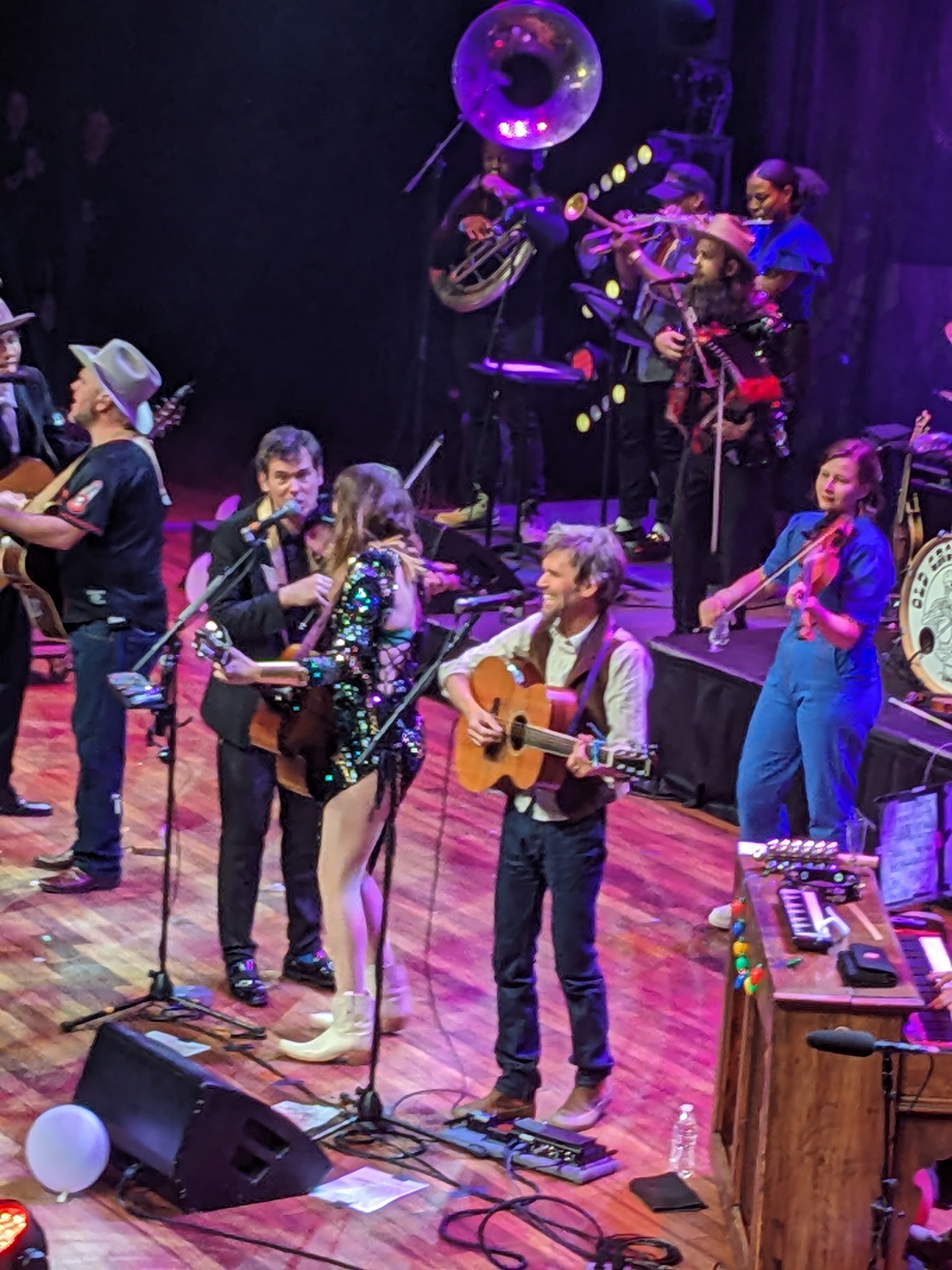
Secor performs with Molly Tuttle and early members of Old Crow Medicine Show at Ryman Auditorium New Year's Eve 2023.

While traveling and busking with Fuqua, Secor met Old Crow Medicine Show co-founder Willie Watson in upstate New York. He met Kevin Hayes in Maine, where he worked raking blueberries. The newly formed group decided to call themselves "Old Crow Medicine Show" in honor of the traveling variety shows, or medicine shows, that roamed the American West in the 1800s. In 1998, the group recorded a 10-song album called Trans:mission and went on their first tour in October 1998, performing across Canada.

In 1999, Secor and his bandmates moved to Boone, North Carolina and settled in a rural barn with no running water, where they worked on their music (and learned to make corn whiskey). In 2000, the group were busking outside Boone Drug downtown on King Street when the daughter of folk-country legend Doc Watson heard them playing, and brought her father back to hear them. Doc invited them to play in his annual MerleFest music festival in Wilkesboro, North Carolina. The gig proved to be a big break for the band, resulting in an invitation to play at the Grand Ole Opry where they met and were mentored by Marty Stuart, and got the opportunity to open for Dolly Parton at the Ryman Auditorium.

=== "Wagon Wheel" ===
Secor is known for co-writing Old Crow Medicine Show's biggest hit and signature song, "Wagon Wheel", which started as a short snippet recorded by Bob Dylan in 1973 called "Rock Me, Mama". It was extended by Secor to include new verses about feeling homesick for the south and hitchhiking his way home. Years later he and Dylan signed a co-writing agreement, agreeing to a 50–50 split in authorship. The final version of the song was released on their second album O.C.M.S. (2004), and was certified Gold in 2011 and Platinum in 2013 by the Recording Industry Association of America. The song has been covered many times, notably by Nathan Carter in 2012 and Darius Rucker in 2013, whose version hit #1 on the Billboard Hot Country Songs chart.

== Touring ==
Secor joined the Railroad Revival Tour as part of Mumford & Sons and Friends in August 2025, appearing with Celisse, Lucius, Nathaniel Rateliff, Trombone Shorty, and others performing in New Orleans, Simpsonville SC, Richmond VA, and Burlington VT.

== Solo album ==
Released on July 11, 2025, Story the Crow Told Me was recorded at Hartland Studios. All its songs were written by Ketch Secor and Jody Stevens, who co-engineered. Secor sang and played fiddle, banjo, harmonica, bass, organ and spoons on the album. Critter Fuqua sat in on drums, adding harmony vocals with Molly Tuttle, Willie Watson, and Morgan Jahnig, who played double-bass. Marty Stuart added mandolin and guest vocals, Jaren Johnston & the Cadillac Three brought slide guitar and harmony vocals, and Eddy Dunlap played pedal steel and sang harmony. Jody Stevens performed on electric guitar, banjo, acoustic guitar and percussion.

Secor’s fiddle opened the album in “Busker’s Spell”, the first part of a "triptych" with “Talkin’ Doc Blues” and “Ghost Train” which related early Old Crow Medicine Show history. The songs tell of Secor and the band busking across Appalachia, Doc Watson discovering them in North Carolina, and their resulting move to Nashville. "Dickerson Road" portrayed the area of Nashville where Secor and members of the group resided when they first came to town. As Secor said, “I think Dickerson Road represents an interesting story in the South’s saga of redistricting and urban renewal, because this corridor hung on and became a kind of testing ground for who can make it. It’s kind of a sink-or-swim strip.” "What Nashville Was" was Secor's tribute to the legends who drew him to Nashville as a teen, most particular Bob Dylan who was there in the late 1960s. Secor added commentary to Dylan’s "Girl From The North Country", layering in extracts of Dylan and Johnny Cash singing together from the “Nashville Skyline” period.

The official video for “What Nashville Was” featured Molly Tuttle and a sample of Bob Dylan and Johnny Cash singing “Girl From The North Country”. At a gala edition of the Grand Ole Opry honoring the 100th year of WSM-AM, "Nashville’s iconic country music broadcaster", Secor played “Old Man River”, a song cycle from his solo album about his journey to and through Nashville and country music with Old Crow Medicine Show.

== Publisher ==
In May 2024 it was announced Secor had signed a "global publishing administration deal" with Sony Music Publishing Nashville. CEO Rusty Gaston said of the arrangement:

Ketch Secor is more than a ‘fiddler in an old-time string band’, he’s a brilliant storyteller. He writes songs that tell the tales of the rural American spirit. A one-of-a-kind talent and a one-of-a-kind human, we couldn’t be prouder to welcome Ketch to the SMP Nashville family.

== Causes and activism ==
In his self-described role as an "ambassador of country music", Secor debuted as the new host of for the 39th season of Tennessee Crossroads, "the long-running travel and culture series", September 4, 2025 on Nashville PBS (WNPT) and the PBS app. Secor appeared on three episodes of the Ken Burns documentary mini-series Country Music (2019), serving as "an advisor, historical consultant, and featured speaker" for the project. He also appeared in the live concert special Country Music: Live at the Ryman (2019). In March 2019 he gave a Ted Talk entitled "Country Music is a Cabbie from Sudan" through TEDxNashville. In 2018, he published Lorraine: The Girl Who Sang the Storm Away with illustrator Higgins Bond, a children's book inspired by Appalachian folktales about a young African-American girl and her grandfather who weather a storm with the help of music.

Secor and his then-wife Lydia Peelle founded the Episcopal School of Nashville in 2016, where he served as Board Chair, Emeritus. He said of the origins of the school:

15 years ago, I began to envision a beautiful little school, filled with kids from all the diverse backgrounds. It would be a community school with a focus on service learning and bring families together from across Nashville to share in building a place for kids unlike any other in our city. It was a vibrant dream, and I couldn’t shake it. I decided that the dream was such a plausible one that maybe, just maybe, it could even come true.

Secor appeared as one of four special performances from the Nashville PBS studios, with Kathy Mattea, Sierra Hull, and Molly Tuttle, on a PBS SoCal three-hour telethon on Saturday, November 8, 2025, It was designed to help to fill the funding gap "created by the loss of our federal funding", said PBS SoCal’s Executive Producer for the Telethon, Maura Daly Phinney. The We ❤ Public Television aired nationwide on Thanksgiving night with a celebrity line-up that included: Josh Groban, Jamie Lee Curtis, Ken Burns, Ziggy Marley, Lily Tomlin, Henry Louis Gates, Jr., Marlee Matlin, Sarah Silverman, and others. The telethon is available on the free PBS App from November 27-December 24, 2025.

=== Gun violence ===
In the aftermath of the March 27, 2023 mass shooting at The Covenant School, a Presbyterian elementary school in the Green Hills neighborhood of Nashville, which left three children and three adults dead, Secor became what Rolling Stone magazine described as "a staunch advocate for gun reform." As a gun owner, prominent in the field of country music, this surprised even him. Secor explained: “I didn’t think that’d be a cause for me… But when the shooting happens in your town, it’s different.” He began "lobbying for gun reform, including red flag laws and a ban on assault weapons". His related op-ed "Country Music Can Lead America Out of Its Obsession With Guns" ran in The New York Times on April 5, 2023.

Secor and Old Crow Medicine Show recorded a music video called Louder Than Guns, which was released one month after the shooting. He then co-produced a "music film" documentary about gun violence, also titled Louder Than Guns, which had its world premiere at the 33rd annual Hot Springs Documentary Film Festival in Hot Springs, Arkansas on October 22, 2024. Abramorama acquired North American theatrical rights to Louder Than Guns, co-produced by NPR Morning Edition host David Greene and directed by Doug Pray. Opening May 8, 2026 at DCTV Firehouse Cinema in New York City, a rollout to additional North American cities follows. On May 18, 2026 a 60-minute version of the documentary airs over PBS Nashville and affiliate stations.

== Personal life ==
Secor moved to Ithaca, New York, at age 19 to attend Ithaca College, while his girlfriend, Lydia Peelle, attended Cornell University. The couple married in 2001, in North Andover, Massachusetts and had two children, a daughter and a son, before divorcing in 2018.

Secor frequently collaborates and writes music with American bluegrass guitarist Molly Tuttle, who occasionally tours and appears with Old Crow Medicine Show. Secor has been in a relationship with Tuttle since 2023, and the couple married on August 22, 2026 in Santa Cruz, California.

Secor endorsed Joe Biden in the 2020 presidential election.
