= List of Blue Grass Boys members =

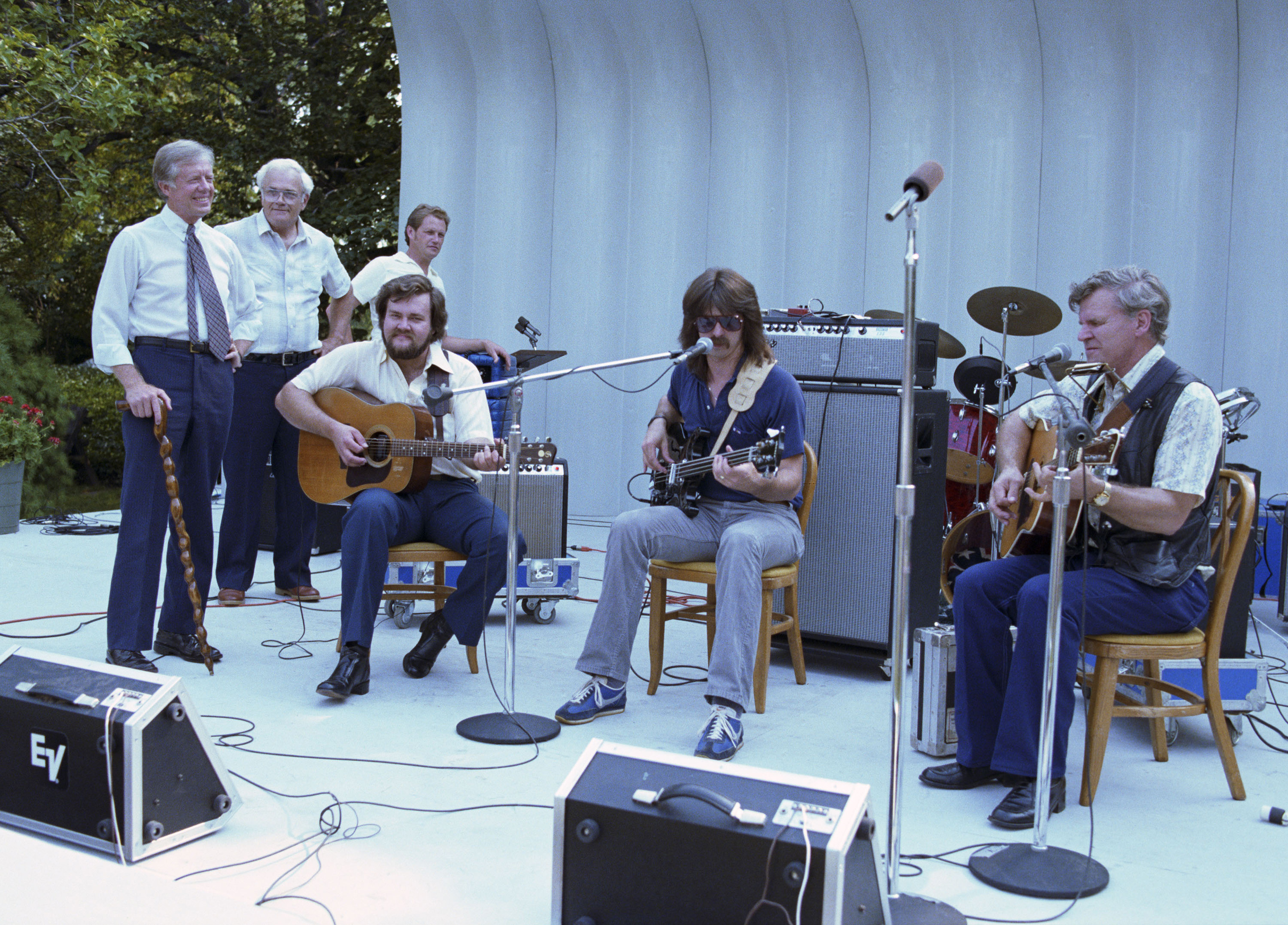
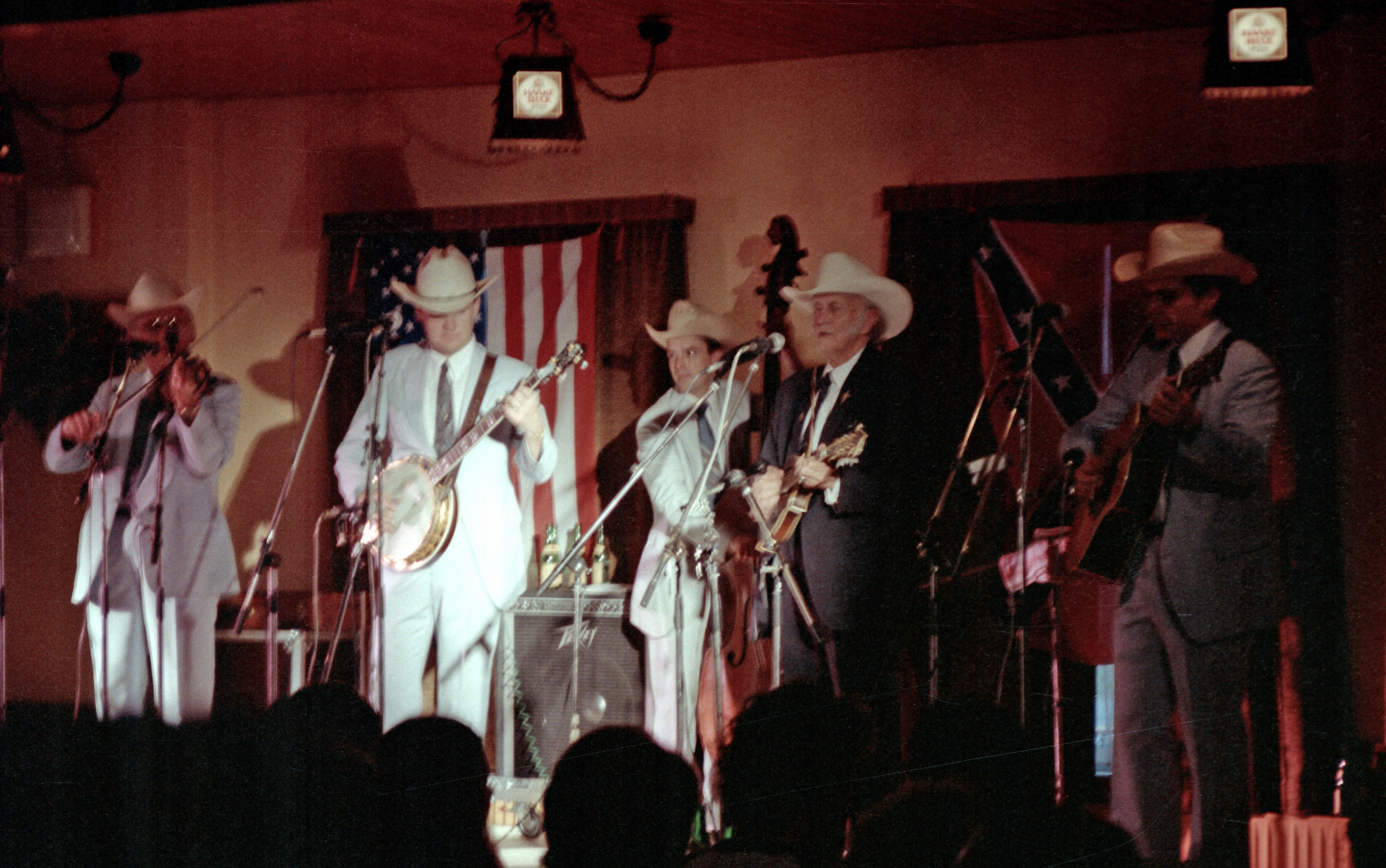
Various incarnations of the Blue Grass Boys performing in 1980 (top), 1982 (middle) and 1989 (bottom).

The Blue Grass Boys were the backing band for bluegrass mandolinist Bill Monroe. Active from 1938 until Monroe's death in 1996, the group are cited as one of the earliest and most influential groups of the bluegrass genre, which takes its name from the band's moniker. Over its 58-year tenure, the Blue Grass Boys included over 150 members, as well as numerous additional stand-in and guest musicians, many of whom have since been inducted into the International Bluegrass Music Hall of Fame and/or Country Music Hall of Fame. At the time of their first recording in 1939, the group's lineup featured guitarist Cleo Davis, fiddler Art Wooten and bassist Walter "Amos" Garren; at the time of their first release in 1940, Monroe was backed by guitarist Clyde Moody, fiddler Tommy Magness and bassist Bill "Cousin Wilbur" Wesbrooks. The final lineup of the band featured guitarist Tom Ewing, banjoist Dana Cupp, fiddlers Robert Bowlin and Clarence "Tater" Tate, and bassist Ernie Sykes. Monroe died on September 9, 1996, at the age of 84.

== History ==
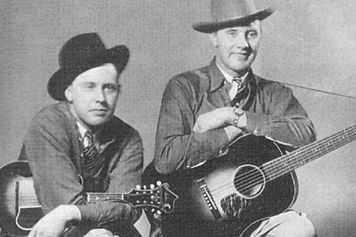
Bill Monroe (left) formed The Blue Grass Boys after several years performing in a duo with his brother Charlie (right).

=== 1930s/1940s ===
==== 1938–1939: Formation, beginnings and the Kentuckians ====
After eight years performing as part of the Monroe Brothers with older brother Charlie, mandolinist Bill Monroe moved to Memphis, Tennessee in the summer of 1938 to form his own group. The first musician he hired was fiddler Bob "Handy" Jamieson in early July, who was soon followed by guitarist Bill Wesbrooks and bassist Chuck Haire, the two of whom shared lead vocal duties. The new quartet relocated to Little Rock, Arkansas, where they performed on radio station KARK from July 15 to August 12 under the name of the Kentucky Blue Grass Boys. A second stint of eight weeks followed from September 26 to November 16, during which time they were named Bill Monroe and the Kentuckians. Once this spell had finished, Monroe moved again — this time to Atlanta, Georgia — to start a new version of his band.

The first musician Monroe hired once in Atlanta was guitarist Cleo Davis. After several unsuccessful auditions at local radio stations in the run-up to Christmas, the pair relocated to Asheville, North Carolina at the beginning of 1939, where they started a show on WWNC and adopted the name of Bill Monroe and the Blue Grass Boys (BGB). After playing for a few months as a duo, Monroe and Davis added Art Wooten on fiddle and Tommy "Snowball" Millard on jug, bones and spoons, with the pair debuting on WFBC in Greenville, North Carolina on May 8, 1939 — three days after the final date for WWNC. Millard left in July as his wife was expecting their first baby, with Walter "Amos" Garren replacing him as the group's first bassist. In October, the BGB moved to Nashville, Tennessee and successfully auditioned to join the Grand Ole Opry.

==== 1939–1941: Early recordings and first musicians' strike ====
On November 25, 1939, the BGB completed their first recording session, performing "Mule Skinner Blues" on the Grand Ole Opry stage. It was not released until 1994, however, when it was included on a retrospective box set. The band toured throughout early 1940, before Wooten was replaced by Tommy Magness that July and Garren made way for Bill Wesbrooks at the beginning of August. At the end of the month, Monroe also gave Davis notice, as he had arranged to hire Clyde Moody in his place. Moody officially joined on September 6, 1940. Around the same time, Clarence "Mac" McGar joined briefly as a second fiddler. In October, the band (without McGar) recorded their first four singles: "Mule Skinner Blues", "Cryin' Holy unto the Lord", "Dog House Blues" and "Tennessee Blues".

By September 1941, Moody had been replaced by Pete Pyle, while Art Wooten had returned from the U.S. Navy to take his place back from Magness. This lineup recorded the band's next four singles at a session in October: "Blue Yodel No. 7 (Fox Trot)", "The Coupon Song", "Shake My Mother's Hand for Me" and "Back Up and Push". Before the end of the year, the BGB were joined by second guitarist and harmonica player Elliott "Curly" Bradshaw, although he left shortly after the U.S. joined World War II that December. Pyle was drafted by the U.S. Army in February 1942, at which point Moody returned to take his place. Jay Hugh Hall played second guitar with the BGB briefly around the same time, joining alongside his former bandmate Moody. Wooten returned to active service in June, with Howard "Howdy" Forrester taking his place. The following month, the group added its first banjoist, David "Stringbean" Akeman. Forrester was drafted in August, although he continued performing until the next March, when he became eligible for active service. Carl Story joined in October 1942, while several other fiddlers stood in for Forrester on tour in early 1943, including Magness, McGar and Floyd Ethridge.

After Forrester's departure, Monroe hired Robert "Chubby" Wise as his official replacement. Stand-ins Story, Magness and Ethridge continued to perform in his place on occasion. Around the same time, Monroe hired Forrester's wife Wilene — who he nicknamed "Sally Ann" — and rehired Bradshaw for his first touring tent show. By the end of the season, both were full members of the BGB — Forrester having taken up the role as the band's first (and only) accordion player. Story's tenure ended in October 1943, when he too was drafted by the U.S. Navy. Before the end of the year, Wesbrooks was replaced by Howard Watts, who adopted the stage name "Cedric Rainwater". None of the BGB lineups during August 1942–November 1944 were able to record, due to an American Federation of Musicians strike.

==== 1944–1948: The classic bluegrass band with Flatt and Scruggs ====
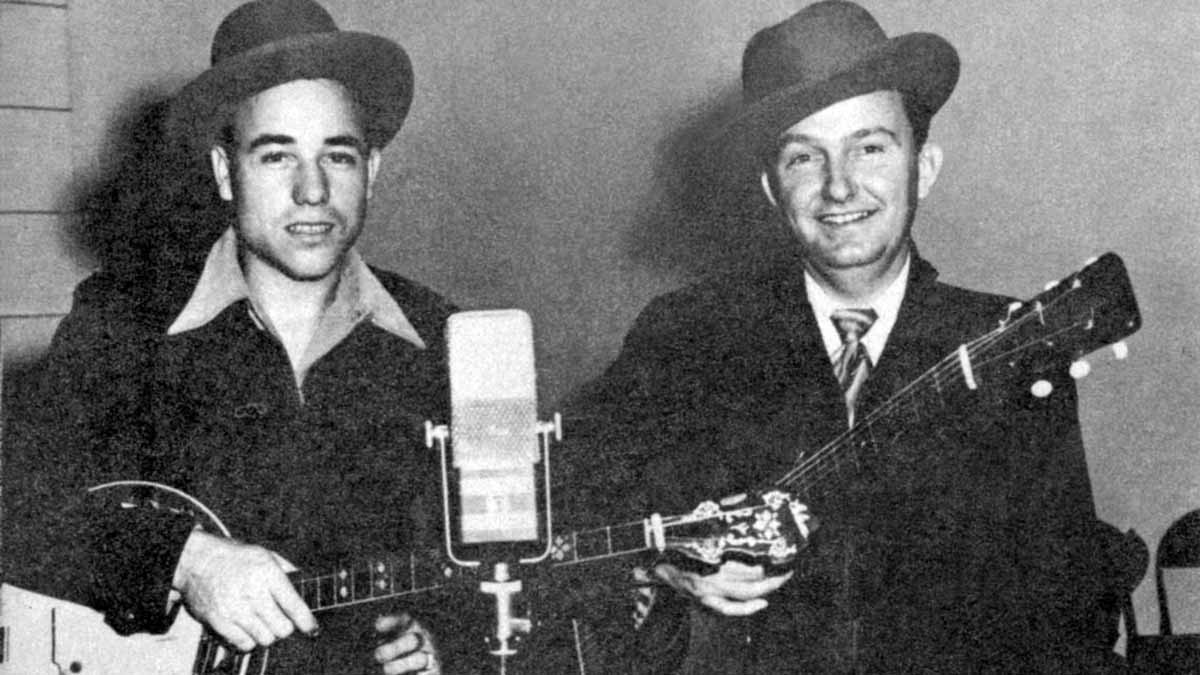
Earl Scruggs (left) and Lester Flatt (right) joined Monroe's band in 1945 and remained until 1948.

The musicians' strike officially ended on November 11, 1944. Before the end of the month, Clyde Moody left to start a solo career and Jimmy "Tex" Willis was brought in to take his place on the recommendation of Wise and Watts. The group completed their first recording session since 1941 — and first for Columbia Records — on February 13, 1945, tracking the singles "Rocky Road Blues", "True Life Blues" and "Blue Grass Special". Early the next month, Watts requested a leave of absence following the death of his father, with friends Willis and Wise joining him. They were temporarily replaced by guitarist Lester Flatt, fiddler Jim Shumate and bassist Andy "Bijou" Boyette. Watts returned in late-April, although Willis and Wise did not, at which point Flatt and Shumate became full-time members, and Bradshaw departed. Watts took another leave of absence in late-July when his wife was about to give birth to their first child, with Monroe's brother Birch brought in as his temporary substitute.

After the war ended in September, Shumate took a brief leave of absence for the birth of his second child. Monroe used various Grand Ole Opry fiddlers in his place, as well as Birch on occasion. That same month, Akeman enlisted in the army and was replaced by Jim Andrews, although within a few weeks the former had returned. He left again at the end of the tent touring season in early November to pursue comedy. Later that month, Howdy Forrester returned from service to retake his position, bringing his brother Joe along to take over bass duties while Watts was still on leave. Shumate remained for around a week as part of a three-fiddle lineup before leaving; his last day with the group was December 1, 1945, when he arranged an audition for Earl Scruggs to take over Akeman's vacated position.

A week after his audition, Scruggs became a member of the BGB. With Joe Forrester now on bass, Birch Monroe switched to second fiddle and bass vocals. The group continued touring in early 1946, before all three Forrester siblings left in March due to "the rigors of the road". Watts returned and, after a few shows without a lead fiddler, Wise returned in April. This new lineup would remain stable for the next two years, producing a string of successful releases which earned them the retrospective title of the "original" or "classic bluegrass band". The new incarnation's first two sessions took place on September 16 and 17, 1946, where they recorded singles including "Mansions for Me", "Blue Moon of Kentucky", "Blue Grass Breakdown" and "Heavy Traffic Ahead".

After the 1946 tent season, Watts took another break to care for his wife and son, with Birch Monroe taking over bass temporarily. Starting the following spring, this role was shared with James "Chick" Stripling, who remained until Watts returned in late-September. On October 27 and 28, 1947, the band recorded a string of new songs, including the singles "My Rose of Old Kentucky", "I Hear a Sweet Voice Calling", "When You Are Lonely" and "I'm Going Back to Old Kentucky". These would be the final sessions for this lineup, and the last to feature Flatt and Scruggs, as the American Federation of Musicians started a second strike on January 1, 1948, which prevented bands from recording for the rest of the year (an agreement was reached that December).

==== 1948–1949: Second musicians' strike and lineup changes ====
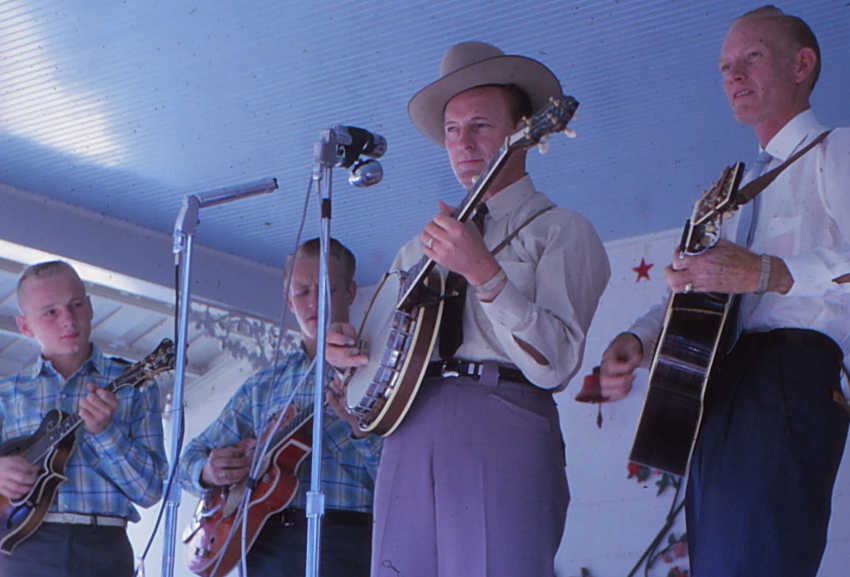
Don Reno replaced Earl Scruggs in March 1948 and later took over on lead vocals in the summer.

In the wake of the second restriction on recording, the entire lineup of the BGB changed. First, in January, Wise left to join former Clyde Moody's solo band, with Benny Martin—who had briefly filled in for Wise during some of the last shows of 1947—taking his place. The next month, Scruggs followed, playing his last show on February 21, 1948. The band tried playing with Tommy Goad and later Lloyd McCraw in place of Scruggs, before a brief period without a banjo player. Flatt and Watts also gave Monroe their notice at this time, remaining until mid-March. Just before they left, the group added Claude "Jackie" Phelps on steel guitar (to cover for the missing banjo) and brought in Joel Price as a temporary stand-in bassist, with both made full-time members upon Flatt and Watts' departures. Having heard the band performing without a banjo, Don Reno turned up at a BGB show on March 9 and performed with the group, with Monroe hiring him almost immediately.

Unhappy with Phelps' performance on lead vocals, Monroe hired Homer "Jim" Eanes in April, who had just spent a few weeks in the first lineup of Flatt and Scruggs' new band the Foggy Mountain Boys (for which Watts had also been enlisted). He only remained for a month, however, and was replaced by Doyle Wright during May and June; when he left too, Reno took over lead vocal duties. The lineup remained stable for the rest of 1948, touring as part of Monroe's last season with a tent show, before Phelps left in March 1949. Stan Hankinson—one half of the Kentucky Twins, who were touring with the BGB—filled in for around a month. In April, Phelps was officially replaced by Malcolm "Mac" Wiseman, another recent alumnus of Flatt and Scruggs' band. Around the same time, Mack Carger replaced Price, who had left to tour with singer George Morgan. By early-June, Martin had also left to work with Roy Acuff, replaced briefly by Floyd Ethridge and later Gene Christian.

Reno left the BGB in mid-July, at which point Wiseman took over as lead vocalist. The band played briefly without a banjo player again, before Rudy Lyle was hired in mid-August to take over. Around the same time, Wise returned on fiddle and Jack Thompson replaced Carger on bass. With the new lineup in place, the BGB recorded four songs on October 22, 1949, which made up two singles: "The Girl in the Blue Velvet Band/Blue Grass Stomp" and "Can't You Hear Me Callin'/Travellin' This Road". In mid-December, Monroe informed Wiseman that he was replacing him with Jimmy Martin, who had joined the related Shenandoah Valley Trio a few months earlier and featured onstage with the BGB a handful of times. Around the same time, Price returned on bass, as Thompson had chosen to leave.

=== 1950s ===
==== 1950–1952: First recordings for Decca ====
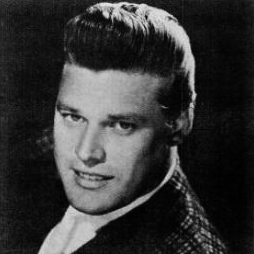
Gordon Terry first joined the BGB at the end of 1950, and would go on to perform with the band for many years.

At the beginning of 1950, Chubby Wise left the BGB for the third and final time, with his former protégé Vassar Clements taking his place. Along with fellow new members Jimmy Martin and Joel Price, the BGB recorded several singles for new label Decca Records at sessions on February 3 and April 8, including a new version of "Mule Skinner Blues". By the summer, Clements had left the band, with Merle "Red" Taylor taking his place. The band's next session, on October 15, yielded the single "When the Golden Leaves Begin to Fall" backed with "Uncle Pen". In mid-December, Taylor announced that he was leaving the band, with Gordon Terry brought in to take his place at the end of the month. Despite the lineup change, however, Terry did not play on the tracks recorded at the band's next session, on January 20, 1951, with Taylor himself filling in. Starting around a week after the session, Vern Young filled in at a few shows for Martin, who was "unavailable for some reason" (he returned on February 3).

On March 17, 1951, Monroe recorded the singles "Kentucky Waltz" and "Swing Low, Sweet Chariot" with a lineup of session musicians assembled by producer Paul Cohen: guitarists Grady Martin and Jimmie Selph, fiddler Tommy Jackson, bassist Ernie Newton, pianist Owen Bradley, and drummer Ferris Coursey. Two weeks later, the regular BGB lineup recorded "Travelin' Blues" and "When the Cactus Is in Bloom" with new fiddler James "Hal" Smith, who had replaced Terry. Another session with Martin, Newton and Coursey — plus guitarist Loren "Jack" Shook — took place on April 23, spawning the single "Highway of Sorrow" and the B-side to "When the Cactus Is in Bloom", "Sailor's Plea". Shortly thereafter, Martin left the group to pursue a solo career. Former member Pete Pyle returned to take his place, but left after a short time as he felt he had "lost it"; the position was subsequently taken by Vic Daniels, before Carter Stanley joined following the temporary disbandment of The Stanley Brothers.

Smith had left around the same time as Martin, with Terry returning in his place. Price left shortly thereafter to work with Little Jimmy Dickens, at which point Monroe asked his girlfriend Bessie Lee Mauldin — who had been travelling with the group on and off for several years — to pick up bass. While she was learning to play, however, she would not be included in recording sessions, with Newton reprising his studio role. In Stanley's two sessions with the BGB on July 1 and 6, 1951, the band recorded the single "Rotation Blues" and three B-sides: "Get Down on Your Knees and Pray", "Sugar Coated Love" and "Cabin of Love". For the second session, alumnus Howard Watts stepped in for Newton. On August 3, 1951, Lyle was drafted to the Korean War. He was replaced temporarily by Manuel "Old Joe" Clark, then by Stanley's brother Ralph. Later in August, Stanley Brothers bandmate Darrell "Pee Wee" Lambert stepped in on mandolin when Monroe switched to guitar to cover for Carter Stanley, who had laryngitis.

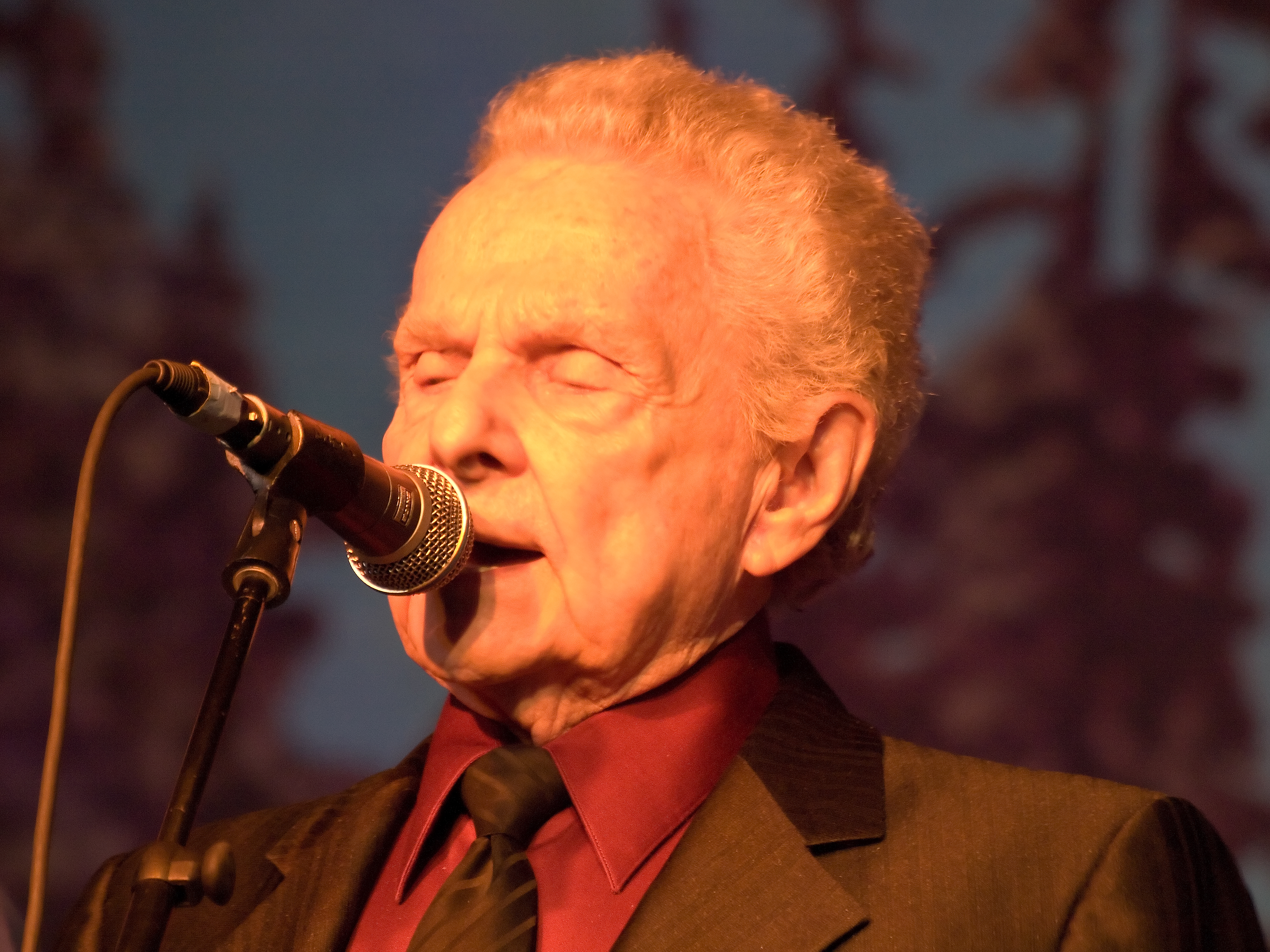
Ralph Stanley briefly filled in on banjo during August 1951, but was unable to join full-time after suffering an injury.

Unable to hire Ralph Stanley full-time due to a car crash which left him and Lambert "critically injured", Monroe replaced Lyle with Joe Drumright in early-September. Johnny Vipperman filled in for Drumright at a show on September 10, then filled in for Monroe on mandolin three days later when he was unable to perform. September 13 was also Carter Stanley's last day with the BGB — he was replaced briefly by South Salyer, followed by Edd Mayfield towards the end of the month. Oscar "Shorty" Shehan joined on bass around the same time to support Mauldin. Drumright was replaced in November by James "Gar" Bowers, who had already filled in at several shows, as well as the session at which the band recorded "Christmas Time's A-Comin'" and "The First Whippoorwill". Shehan left at the end of 1951, with Clark returning to fill in for the bassist. Around January or February 1952, Bowers and Terry were replaced by Larry Richardson and Charlie Cline, respectively.

==== 1952–1956: Constant changes in personnel ====
Mayfield and Richardson left in late-June 1952 due to the increasing demands of touring. Mayfield was briefly replaced by Billy Price, while Cline took on banjo duties on top of fiddle. By mid-July, Martin had returned to the group, bringing 14-year-old Roland "Sonny" Osborne with him to take over on banjo. The band recorded their next string of singles in July, once again with Newton contributing bass. By mid-September, Osborne had returned to school, with Jim Smoak taking his place. The band toured until the end of the year, before Cline left at the beginning of January 1953. He was replaced by Terry on a stand-in basis. Just a few weeks later, on January 16, Monroe and Mauldin were injured when their car was struck by a drunk driver, with both hospitalised briefly.

Monroe was released from the hospital in mid-April 1953, three months after his accident; the band's lineup when they resumed touring included Martin, new fiddler Luther "L. E." White, Cline on banjo, and stand-in member Guy Stevenson on bass. Sonny Osborne returned in May, having left school permanently to focus on music, and Leslie Sandy took over on bass in June, after a brief period as a stand-in. Osborne only remained until August, when he suddenly left upon his brother Bobby's return from active service, at which point Rudy Lyle returned to take his place. Cline returned to his regular role as BGB fiddler in November, when White left to join the Osborne Brothers. At the end of the month, the band (with session bassist Newton) recorded "Wishing Waltz", "I Hope You Have Learned" and "Get Up John". Sandy left in December, replaced by the returning Bessie Lee Mauldin. More recordings followed in January 1954, one session featuring guitarist Grady Martin and another vocalist, Milton Estes.

After the sessions, Lyle left the BGB for a second time, claiming that "things weren't the same" as during his first tenure. He was briefly replaced by Bobby Atkins, although he left after just three days with the group due to homesickness. Jim Smoak returned in his place. Several other lineup changes took place during the beginning of the year: around the time of Lyle's departure, "Little" Robert van Winkle starting filling in on bass; at the end of January, Cline left again, replaced at various shows by either Red Taylor, Gordon Terry or Dale Potter; in February, Martin served his notice, replaced by the returning Edd Mayfield in March; and in April, Jack Youngblood took over on fiddle, while "Lazy" Jim Day took over as tand-in bassist. Youngblood had left again by late-May, replaced by returning stand-ins Taylor and Terry, plus Cline, the three of whom started performing together as the BGB's first three-fiddle lineup. This lineup took part in one session in June, recording "Close By" and "Put My Little Shoes Away".

At the end of a tour in August, Smoak left the band again, with Monroe and the remaining BGB members recording a new version of "Blue Moon of Kentucky" at the beginning of September without a banjoist. For live shows that month, Cline performed banjo and Leslie Sandy returned on bass. Sandy did not last long, however, and by October had left again. He was replaced by Bobby Hicks, who was offered a place in the BGB lineup at the end of the tour on fiddle, which he accepted. For shows in November and December, Jackie Phelps returned to take over from the departing Mayfield. Around late-February 1955, the BGB underwent several lineup changes ahead of the year's performances, adding guitarist and vocalist Carlos Brock, switching Phelps to banjo and Cline to fiddle, and reinstating Mauldin on bass. Noah Crase, who had arrived at the same time as Brock and auditioned with the band, took over from Phelps upon his departure in March, remaining until May, when Cline switched back to banjo.

==== 1955–1958: Recording drought and return with first album ====
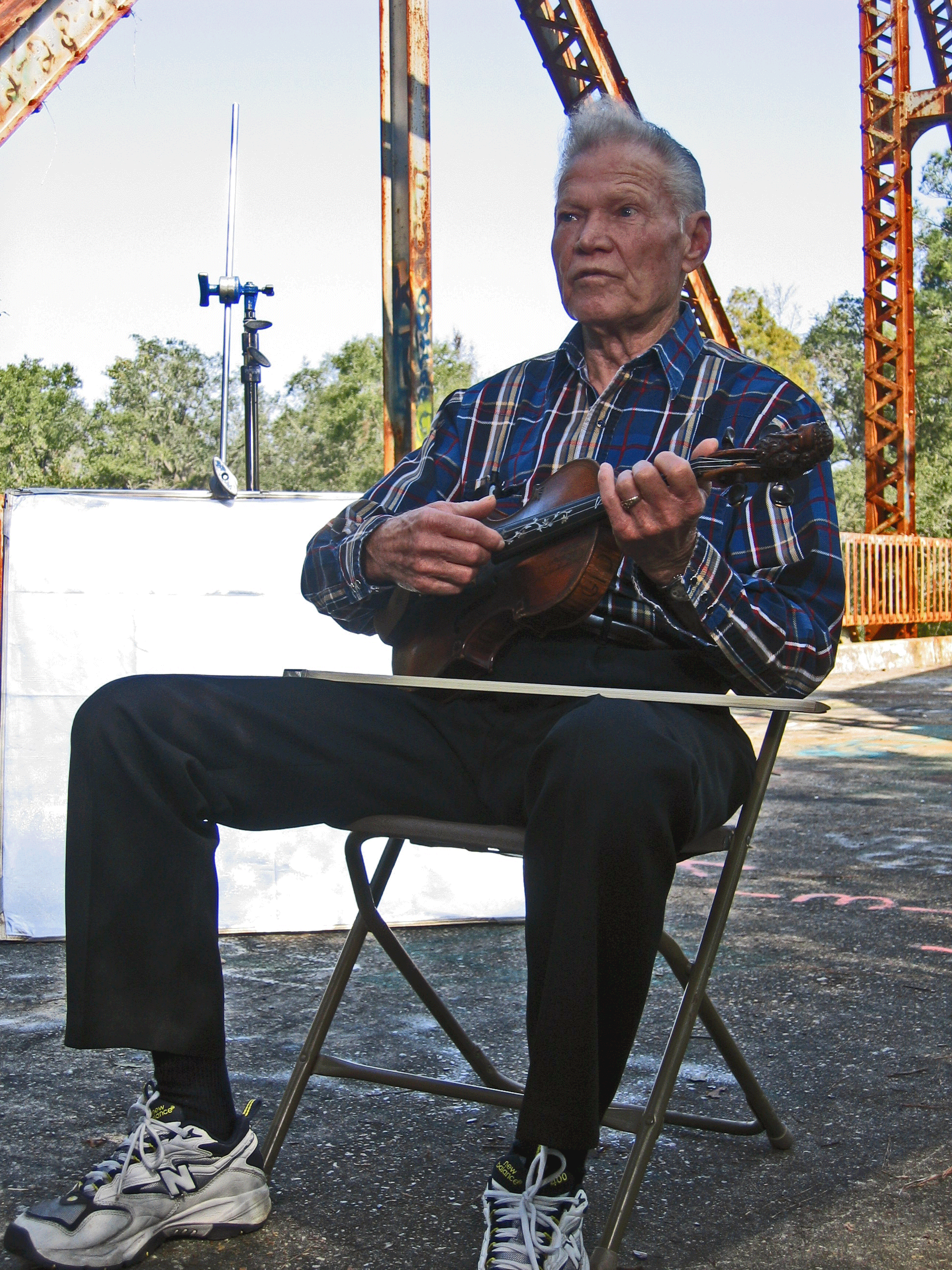
After an initial spell during early-1950, fiddler Vassar Clements rejoined the BGB in December 1955.

Brock left in early July, with Cline switching to guitar and Hicks covering banjo duties alongside fiddle. The following month, Joe Stuart took over on banjo, joining on August 18, 1955, after playing mandolin with the group the night before. In September, the band had its first recording session with Stuart and Mauldin, which spawned three tracks issued on albums in the 1960s. Vassar Clements — who had performed alongside Hicks and fellow guest Gordon Terry at the September session — subsequently rejoined the band, which saw the third departure of Cline in December 1955 — replaced by Arnold Terry. After touring the first two months of 1956, Terry left on March 2, replaced by Lucky Saylor. He remained until the end of April, replaced by Yates Green in time for a tour which also included a brief spell with Rudy Lyle filling in on banjo for Stuart, who joined Hicks on fiddle. By mid-June, Green had left the band. Stuart subsequently switched to guitar and Noah Crase returned on banjo for a week of rehearsals, before Roger Smith joined at the end of the month in a shared role with Stuart. Phelps briefly returned on guitar during August.

Hicks left in September 1956. Tommy Williams briefly filled in, before Clarence "Tater" Tate was hired later that month, starting with a show at which Edd Mayfield filled in on guitar. By the beginning of October, Mayfield had been replaced by Enos Johnson (after a brief fill-in by Bob Metzel); by the middle of the month, Tate had been replaced by Ralph "Joe" Meadows; and by the start of December, Johnson had been replaced by Carl Vanover. Vanover himself left after just a month, with Metzel stepping in again as a substitute. In late-January, Gordon Terry replaced Meadows, Don Stover joined on banjo, and Stuart switched back to guitar.

The lineup of Monroe, Stuart, Stover, Terry and Mauldin (plus session fiddler Tommy Jackson) recorded "Four Walls" and B-side "Fallen Star" on April 20, 1957 — the BGB's first recording session in nearly a year and a half. Further sessions on May 14 (featuring Jackson and Dale Potter) and May 15 (featuring Potter and guitarist Leslie Sandy) spawned nine tracks for the BGB's first LP record, Knee Deep in Blue Grass. Stover left around a month after the sessions, with Stuart switching back to banjo and Ernie Graves followed by Bill "Chum" Duncan filling in on guitar. During this period, Kenny Baker took over on fiddle. Duncan left in October, so for the final session for the upcoming album in December, Doug Kershaw performed guitar (another session musician, Jimmy Elrod, played banjo so Stuart could play fiddle). Knee Deep in Blue Grass, featuring all 12 tracks from the last three sessions, was released on June 23, 1958.

==== 1958–1959: Second album and temporary lineups ====
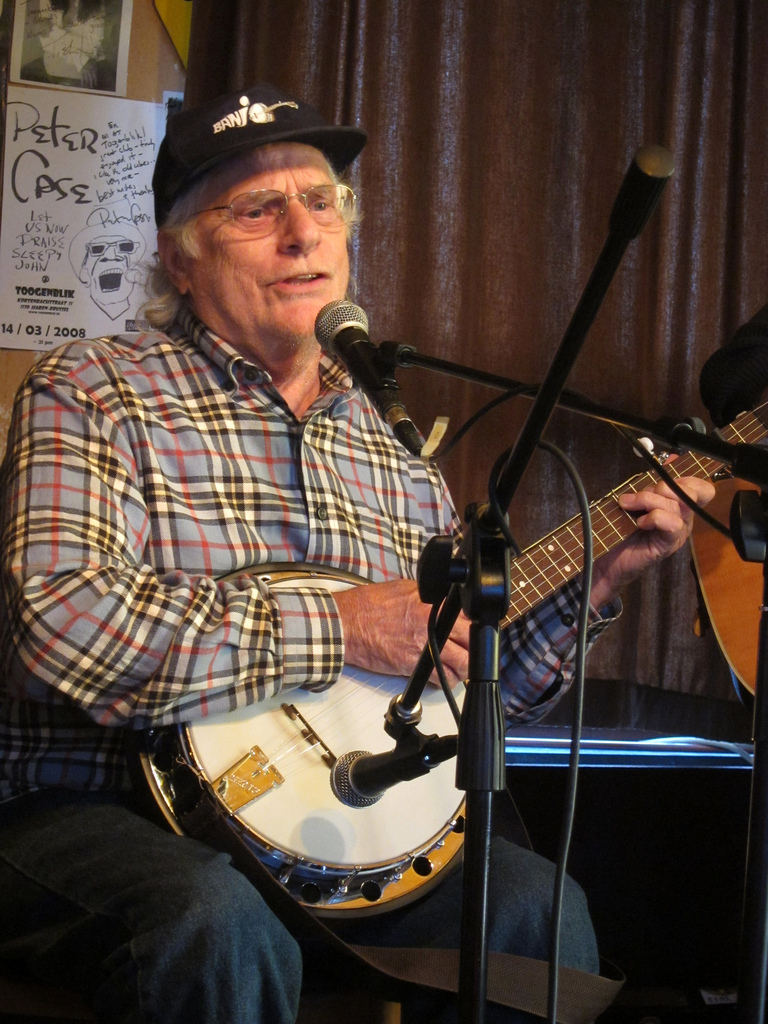
Eddie Adcock played banjo for the Blue Grass Boys for two months between April and June 1958.

Earl Snead joined in January 1958 to replace Stuart on banjo. Charlie Smith briefly filled in on guitar, before Edd Mayfield returned in mid-February. The band recorded their second album I Saw the Light during February and March, with session contributors Culley Holt, Gordon Terry (both bass vocals) and Owen Bradley (organ) performing on several tracks. In early-April, the group recorded the instrumentals "Panhandle Country" and "Scotland", with Joe Drumright filling on banjo following Snead's departure, and Hicks guesting on second fiddle. By late-April, Snead's position had been filled by Eddie Adcock, Baker had been replaced by the returning Red Taylor, and Mauldin had temporarily left (with her replacement unknown). Adcock had left by the end of June. On July 7, 1958, Edd Mayfield died of leukemia. Monroe and Taylor played a few shows over the next month with Charlie Smith, although the status of any other personnel within the band at this time is largely unknown.

By mid-August, Monroe had reunited with Mauldin and Taylor had been replaced by Roger Smith. Due to financial challenges, the rest of the band's lineup featured a string of stand-ins over the next few months, including guitarist and singer Connie Gately, Bill Emerson and later Joe Drumright on banjo, Charlie Cline switching between guitar and bass, and Charlie Smith on fiddle. Bobby Hicks returned from the army in early-October, and by late-November the group settled back into a regular lineup — Monroe, Hicks and Mauldin, plus guitarist and vocalist Jack Cooke and banjoist Robert "Buddy" Pennington. This incarnation recorded the single "Gotta Travel On" and two instrumentals on December 1, 1958. By the time of the next session on January 30, 1959 — where the band recorded the single "Dark as the Night, Blue as the Day" and two more tracks — Charlie Smith had returned and become BGB's second fiddler. In late-May, Hicks left to work with Porter Wagoner.

Smith left in July 1959. Kenny Baker and later Dale Potter joined as temporary stand-ins, with Potter made a full-time member thereafter. Around the same time, Pennington was replaced by Joe Stuart. By October, Stuart had left again, with Curtis McPeake briefly filling in for him. For the band's final session of the year on November 25, Joe Drumright played banjo and former member Benny Martin featured on fiddle for the A-side of the single "Lonesome Wind Blues" — his only recording with the BGB. Cooke left after the session and Tony Ellis was hired on banjo for the start of the next year.

=== 1960s ===
==== 1960–1962: More instability and the next two albums ====
The BGB's lineup remained somewhat unstable going into 1960. The band's first tour of the year started in late-January supporting Johnny Cash, for which the lineup featured existing members Dale Potter and Bessie Lee Mauldin, alongside new banjo player Tony Ellis and stand-in guitarist Jimmy Byrd. Potter suffered a stroke on the first night, however, and was replaced for the rest of the shows by former member Gordon Terry, then a member of Cash's band. The band continued working through the summer, with Potter playing Grand Ole Opry shows and various stand-ins (including Billy Baker and Joe Stuart) taking over on the road. By early-August, Ellis had decided to take a leave of absence, although he stood in on bass for a few shows with Porter Church on banjo. One of the shows, on August 9, featured Roger Drake on fiddle. In mid-August, the band played the inaugural Blue Grass Day festival with a lineup including Church on guitar, Rudy Lyle on banjo, Stuart on fiddle and Danny Cline on bass.

Ellis returned in September, when the band brought in Frank Buchanan to take over on guitar and vocals. By November, he had been replaced by Bobby Smith. Starting on November 30, 1960, the band recorded tracks for Monroe's third album, Mr. Blue Grass, with Carl Butler and Curtis McPeake performing session guitar and banjo, respectively. Returning to touring at the beginning of 1961, the lineup of Monroe, Smith, Ellis and Mauldin was accompanied by various stand-in players on fiddle, including during the summer by former bassist Shorty Shehan and previous substitute Billy Baker. After headlining the All Blue Grass Show on July 4, Ellis left the band. He was replaced by Bobby Atkins, returning after a brief spell a few years prior. Billy Baker became a full member around the same time, although a month later he was replaced by the returning Vassar Clements. Smith and Atkins were replaced by Jimmy Maynard and Curtis McPeake, respectively, ahead of sessions on November 9 and 10, 1961.

At the end of November, the BGB played a show at Carnegie Hall with new fiddlers Norman "Buddy" Spicher and Benny Williams, who had replaced Clements after the last sessions (at which they both contributed). Monroe had originally asked Tony Ellis and Bobby Joe Lester to play banjo and fiddle at the show, but they had arrived too late, so they remained with the group and contributed to their next recording sessions on November 30 and December 4, 1961, instead. All 12 tracks recorded over the four sessions in late-1961 were released on the BGB's fourth album, Bluegrass Ramble, the following June. Early into the start of 1962, Tony Ellis rejoined the band on banjo, replacing McPeake. A couple of months later, Frank Buchanan replaced Maynard on guitar and Harold "Red" Stanley replaced Spicher on fiddle. During April and May, the band took part in six recording sessions, at which they recorded a total of 18 songs planned for two upcoming albums (one gospel, one secular). Ellis left again in July.

Ellis was replaced by David Deese, while Stanley was replaced by Charlie Smith late in the summer. Deese remained only until late-August, when Monroe started using stand-ins again, including Ray Goins. Lonnie Hoppers joined as permanent banjo player at the end of September ahead of a week-long tour, after which Buchanan and Williams left. For the remainder of the year, Jimmy Maynard and Joe Stuart rotated on guitar; Kenny Baker replaced Williams on fiddle. At the end of the year, the band (with Stuart) completed recording for Bluegrass Special and I'll Meet You in Church Sunday Morning.

==== 1963–1964: Rotating lineups and Mauldin's departure ====
Del McCoury played guitar for the BGB for around a year starting in February 1963. He performed at just one session.

Shortly after their first show of 1963 at the beginning of January, Stuart and Hoppers were replaced temporarily by Dixie Gentlemen members Jake Landers and Rual Yarbrough, respectively. Jack Cooke and Del McCoury filled in at a shows on February 8. The following month, McCoury joined the BGB as an official member on guitar, with Bill Keith also joining as the group's new banjoist. As he was still a non-union musician, however, McCoury was unable to take part in the band's sessions at the end of March, with former members Benny Williams and Jackie Phelps taking his place at a session each. Baker left the band in May, with Buddy Pendleton and Bill Sage filling on for him at various shows. Jim Bessire also stood in for Mauldin at a show at the start of June. Billy Baker returned on fiddle later in the summer, before Joe Stuart took over in the fall. By December, Keith had left the BGB. For shows later in the month, Ry Cooder and Bobby Diamond filled in.

In January 1964, Stuart switched to banjo and Benny Williams returned on fiddle, with Billy Baker joining him briefly. McCoury and Baker failed to show up for the first of two recording sessions at the end of the month, so Stuart covered guitar, Joe Drumright was brought in to play banjo, and Williams was the sole fiddler. For the second session the next day, McCoury returned, Drumright remained, and Stuart switched back to fiddle. McCoury left just before a third session on February 3, with Jimmy Maynard standing in on guitar, Stuart playing banjo, and Buddy Spicher added on second fiddle. During a tour which started the next week, Monroe informed long-time bassist Bessie Lee Mauldin that he would be replacing her. She remained for their next session in April, however, which also featured Jackie Phelps.

Live performances in mid-May featured a BGB lineup of Stuart and Williams, plus stand-ins Bobby Smith on guitar and Ken Marvin on bass. At Bean Blossom later in the month, Williams and Marvin were joined by Jimmy Maynard on guitar and Bruce Weathers on banjo. Jimmy Elrod took over from Weathers for a run of shows in June. By late-June, Sandy Rothman had taken over on guitar. Shortly thereafter, the band played a few shows with Gene Roberts on banjo, before Steve Arkin was hired by Monroe's new manager Ralph Rinzler. Rothman and Arkin were union musicians in other states, so did not perform at Grand Ole Opry shows, and both soon left at various points in August. Arkin was replaced by Don Lineberger, while several musicians temporarily stood in on guitar over the next month, including alumni Jack Cooke and Jimmy Maynard. By September, Rothman had been replaced on a permanent basis by Jimmy Elrod.

==== 1964–1967: More stability and recording Blue Grass Time ====
During a tour in October, the BGB performed with temporary lineups in two shows in an attempt to reduce travel costs — on October 9, Monroe was joined by Peter Rowan on guitar, Bill Keith on banjo, Gene Lowinger on fiddle and Roger Bush on bass; on October 31, Rowan, Keith and Lowinger were joined by second fiddler Benjamin "Tex" Logan and bassist Everett Alan Lilly. Around the same time, Monroe's son James joined as the band's new full-time bassist, having played with the group part-time for a few months. The band recorded the single "I Live in the Past" in March 1965, which featured Buddy Spicher on second fiddle, before playing another two shows in April with temporary lineups — the first featured Del McCoury on guitar, Julian "Winnie" Winston on banjo, Lowinger on fiddle and Ronnie McCoury on bass; the second featured Rowan on guitar, Keith on banjo and Lowinger on fiddle. Rowan subsequently joined the band officially, with Lowinger following him at the beginning of June.

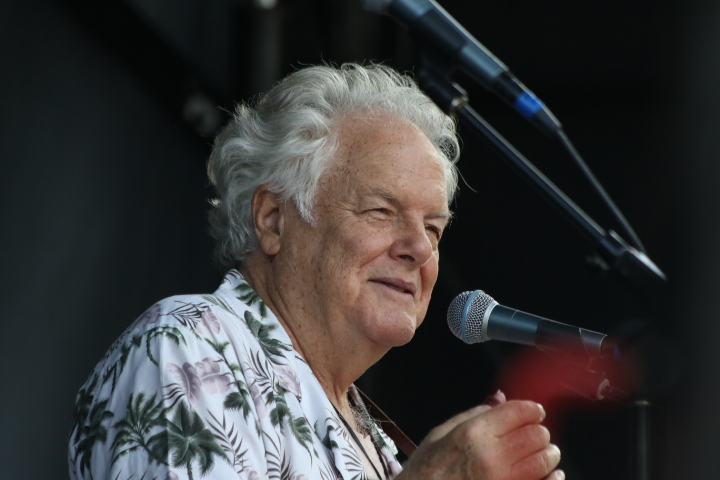
Peter Rowan spent two years as the guitarist and lead vocalist for the BGB starting in the spring of 1965.

Lineberger quit the BGB on August 7, 1965. He was replaced by Lamar Grier on September 4, the day after David Deese deputised on banjo. While Grier was completing the notice period at his previous job, the band performed a show each with J. D. Crowe and Neil Rosenberg on banjo. After just a few shows during the last few months of the year, Lowinger also quit in January 1966, choosing to study classical violin instead. He was replaced by Richard Greene towards the end of the month, who became a full-time member on April 1, 1966, after a few shows as a stand-in (the first of which also featured stand-in bassist Dick Miller). The lineup of Rowan, Grier, Greene and Monroe remained in place for the rest of the year, recording Blue Grass Special at a string of sessions starting in October.

After recording was completed for Blue Grass Time, both Rowan and Greene left the BGB at the beginning of March 1967 — the former on March 1, the latter on March 5. Greene was replaced by Byron Berline and Rowan was replaced by Curtis Blackwell for "a few weeks". After he left, Mylos "Myles" Sonka stood in for two shows on March 25 and April 2, Mitchell Land filled in for a couple of shows, and Benny Williams filled in from the second week of April. Harley "Red" Allen took over at the end of April, but only played one show (on April 29) before leaving due to illness, with Doug Green taking over from April 30 for the next four weeks. When a bus carrying Grier, Berline and James Monroe broke down at the start of a tour, however, Bill Monroe and Green were forced to play with stand-in musicians at four shows in early and mid-May, including members of The Dillards and The Kentucky Colonels. After the shows, Green was replaced by Roland White of the Colonels.

==== 1967–69: James Monroe on guitar and Kenny Baker's return ====
On June 24 and 25, Monroe hosted and headlined the first incarnation of his Bean Blossom festival. 18-year-old Joseph "Butch" Robins was hired to replace Lamar Grier on banjo, although Grier returned just after the shows to fill in at recording on June 30 as it required a union musician. The next day, Robins left again after an unsuccessful audition to join the Grand Ole Opry, with Grier returning in his place, although only for another three weeks before he departed himself, replaced by Vic Jordan on July 27, 1967. In late-August, the band recorded the single "Virginia Darlin'". Berline left after a final show on September 5 to start his service with the army. He was replaced by the returning Benny Williams, who remained until mid-March the next year. This lineup completed one recording session, on November 9, 1967, which spawned the single "Train 45" and also featured guest performer Vassar Clements on lead fiddle. Kenny Baker returned on March 23, 1968, starting his third tenure.

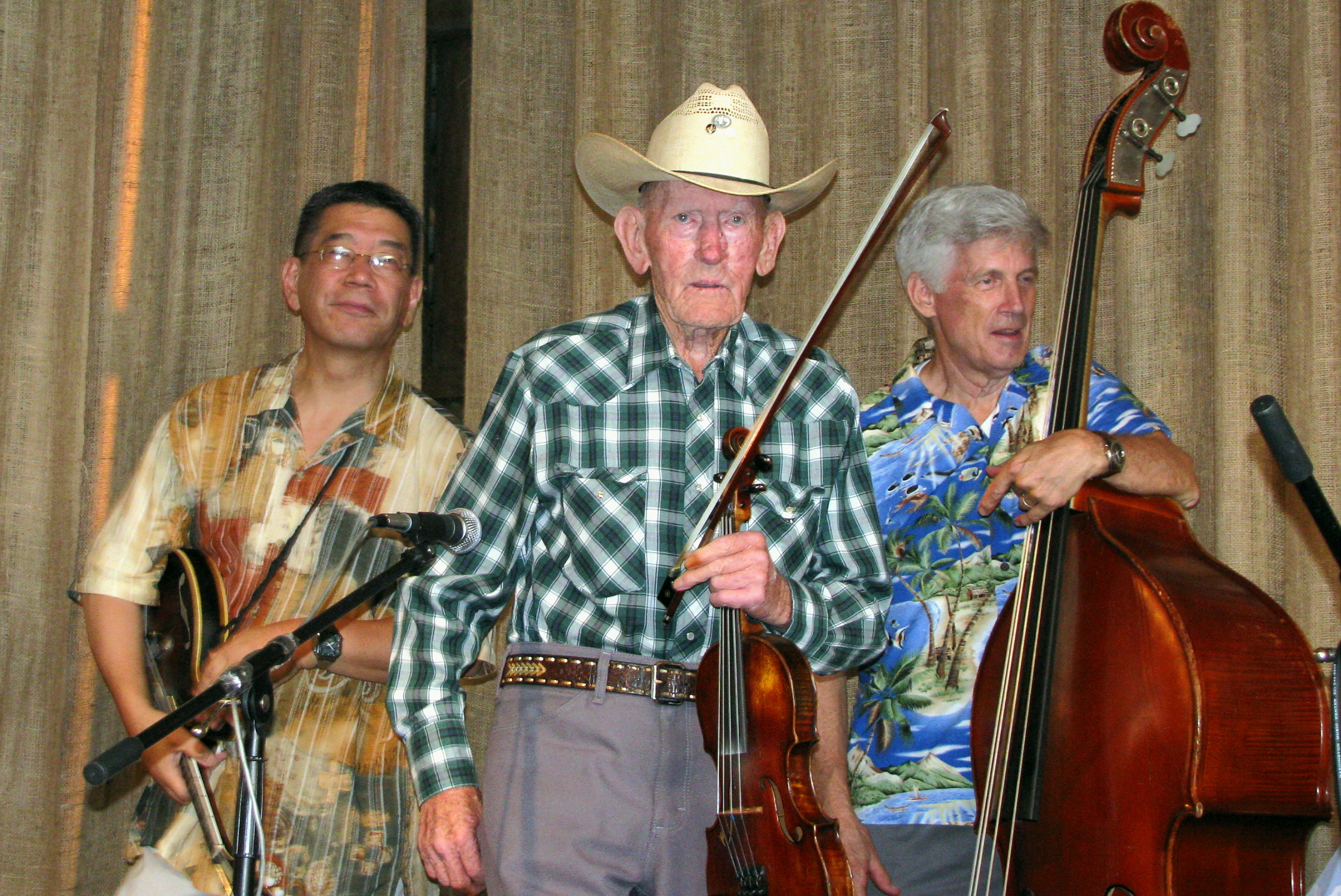
Fiddler Kenny Baker returned to the Blue Grass Boys in 1968, starting a tenure which would see him become the longest-serving member of the band.

The lineup of White, Jordan, Baker and Monroe remained stable for the rest of the year, with the only temporary incarnation happening for one show in September when former guitarist Doug Green filled in on bass, as Monroe was in court for divorce proceedings. White, Jordan, Baker and Monroe completed one recording session together on November 14, 1968. In March 1969, White and Jordan left the BGB to join Lester Flatt's new solo band, formed after he parted ways with Earl Scruggs. They played their last show with the group on March 18. James Monroe subsequently switched to guitar, with Doug Green returning to take over on bass, while banjo was covered for one show by stand-in Howard Aldridge, before Rual Yarbrough joined on March 24. The new lineup completed two recording sessions in March and April, recording seven tracks with session bassist Joe Zinkan and second fiddlers Joe "Red" Hayes (at the first session) and Tommy Williams (at the second).

Personnel remained the same through much of the summer of 1969. Former banjo player Butch Robins filled in for Yarbrough on the first day of a festival on June 28 after the band's bus broke down, and Green left after a final Grand Ole Opry show on July 12, swapping places with Bill Yates in Jimmy Martin's band. Yates performed at two recording sessions — one each in October, November and December — before leaving the band just before Christmas. For a handful of shows running into the new year, bass was performed by temporary stand-in Earl Snead, former BGB banjoist.

=== 1970s ===
==== 1970–1971: Joe Stuart's return and James Monroe's departure ====
In February 1970, William "Skip" Payne took over as the BGB's bassist. Just before his first session in late-March, however, his father suffered a heart attack and he returned home to be with him. The four songs recorded at the session did not feature a bassist, with bass overdubbed later by an unknown musician. Payne eventually left in mid-September, with Joe Stuart (who had recently started making appearances as second fiddler) replacing him in the lineup. By the end of November, Rual Yarbrough had given Monroe his two-week notice of leaving, although he remained until a replacement could be found. The group's final recording sessions of the year took place on December 2 and 3, with Bobby Thompson hired to play banjo and Kenny Baker joined on fiddle by guest Red Hayes and former BGB member Gordon Terry, who also played guitar. Yarbrough had completed his departure by late-December, replaced starting on Christmas Day by Roby "R. C." Harris.

Harris quit after "about a week" due to low pay, with Earl Snead returning in time for a session on January 13, 1971, at which four tracks were recorded. Bobby Thompson filled in again at further sessions on January 15 and 20, the latter of which also featured Buddy Spicher on additional fiddle. Harris returned to the band after the sessions, although by late-April he had left again for the same reason as before, replaced by 18-year-old Jack Hicks. Just before Hicks' arrival, Travis Stewart joined the band to replace James Monroe, who had chosen to leave to form him own group. For a few weeks while Monroe remained, Stewart played bass and Stuart switched to fiddle, before Stewart took over guitar and vocals at the end of the month. At the end of June, Stuart was able to switch back to fiddle again, as Doug Hutchens joined as the band's new bassist. Dan Jones took over from Stewart on the same day, June 26, 1971. By the end of August, both Hutchens and Jones had left the BGB.

==== 1971–1976: Bean Blossom live album and The Weary Traveler studio return ====
After a few shows with stand-in bassists, Monroe Fields joined as the official replacement for Doug Hutchens during September 1971. The lineup of Joe Stuart, Jack Hicks, Kenny Baker and Fields remained stable for the rest of the year and throughout 1972, during which time they recorded the single "My Old Kentucky and You", as well as the bulk of Bill and James Monroe's first collaboration not credited to the BGB, Father & Son, released on March 1, 1973. Stuart left shortly thereafter, replaced by Bob Fowler on March 12. Fields followed in early-April, with Guy Stevenson taking over from April 13. Performances by this lineup at the Bean Blossom festival in June were recorded for a live album released later in the year; four tracks on the second day of the festival featured a host of guest fiddlers, including former BGB members Gordon Terry, Howdy Forrester and Tater Tate. By mid-July, both Fowler and Stevenson had left the band, replaced by Bill Box and Gregg Kennedy, respectively.

Jack Hicks followed Fowler and Stevenson in leaving the group not long after, playing his last show on September 9, 1973. The band auditioned Ben Pedigo of Buck White and the Down Home Folks to replace him, but he was not hired. Richard Hefner took over a few days later as stand-in banjo player, before Pedigo was hired and debuted on September 18; he remained until November 4, when he went back to school. Various musicians filled in over the next few weeks, including Randy Chapman at two shows and Larry Bartosh at one. Jim Moratto was hired on December 13, 1973. By mid-July 1974, Monroe and Baker were without bandmates after Box, Moratto and Kennedy all left. They were replaced later in the month by Ralph Lewis, Dwight Dillman and Randy Davis, respectively. Dillman only remained until September, however, when he was replaced by Bob Black. The new lineup recorded songs for Monroe's next album, The Weary Traveler, over the course of three sessions in March 1975, which also featured James Monroe on guitar and Joe Stuart on fiddle. This incarnation remained stable throughout the rest of the year, completing tours of Japan and Europe in the process.

==== 1976–1979: Second Bean Blossom live album and Bluegrass Memories ====
After nearly two years with the same lineup, the BGB lost Ralph Lewis in late-February 1976, replaced by Bob Jones. He only remained until mid-May, however, and was replaced before the end of the month by Wayne Lewis. Former Country Gentlemen banjoist Bill Holden replaced Bob Black in mid-September. The next month, the band recorded six tracks over two sessions with Holden, as well as returning performers James Monroe and Joe Stuart, plus guest third fiddler Blaine Sprouse. Holden left the following March due to poor pay, replaced by Larry Beasley after a brief stand-in stint by Alan O'Bryant. By the end of June he had returned for a second stint, although this time lasted just over a month before leaving again in early-August. During this second spell, the band recorded Bluegrass Memories across three sessions in late-July. Like the year before, James Monroe played guitar at these sessions, while Buddy Spicher substituted for Kenny Baker who had injured his hand earlier that month.

Butch Robins replaced Holden on September 2, 1977. James Bryan was also brought in on a temporary basis as cover for Baker, who was still recovering from his hand injury. Baker returned at the beginning of October, at which point Bryan was transferred to James Monroe's band. The band did not record a new studio album in 1979, but did record their performance at the Bean Blossom festival for a second live album, which was released the following February. Shortly after the festival in mid-June, Randy Davis ended his five-year tenure as a member of the band. Raymond Huffmaster briefly filled in for a few shows, before Mark Hembree was hired at the end of the month to replace Davis.

=== 1980s/1990s ===
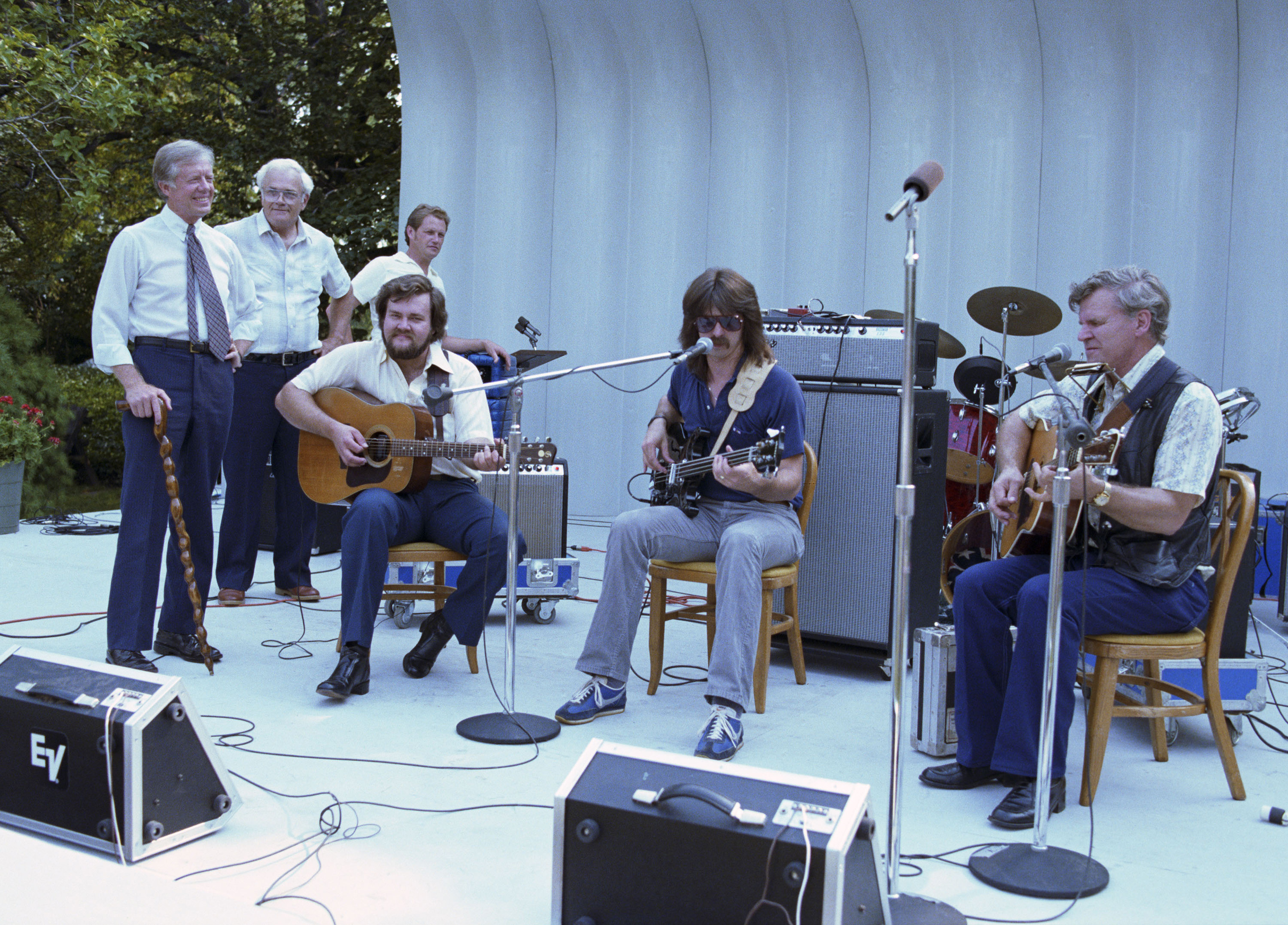
Members of the Blue Grass Boys onstage with then-President of the United States, Jimmy Carter.

==== 1980–1986: Three new albums and Kenny Baker's final departure ====
The lineup of Wayne Lewis, Butch Robins, Kenny Baker and Mark Hembree remained stable throughout all of 1980. In February 1981, they recorded Monroe's next album Master of Bluegrass, his first studio effort in four years; guitarist Norman Blake and mandolinists Jesse McReynolds and Larry Sledge performed at the third session. By late-June that year, Robins had quit the band due to financial difficulties, playing his last show on July 2, 1981. After one show with Paul Kovac and a few with former BGB member R. C. Harris on banjo, Blake Williams from James Monroe's band took over on a permanent basis at the end of July. The new lineup recorded Monroe's next album, Bill Monroe and Friends, in various sessions between December 1982 and May 1983. Initially due for release that June, it was delayed until January 1984.

After that year's Bean Blossom festival, Hembree left the group in mid-June 1984. His place was initially filled by stand-in Johnnie Baker (Kenny Baker's son), before former BGB fiddler Clarence "Tater" Tate returned as his official replacement from June 29. That fall, Kenny Baker left the band after a tenure lasting more than 14 years, quitting in the middle of a show on October 12, 1984, after Monroe repeatedly refused to provide the fiddler with an itinerary for an upcoming Japanese tour. For a show in Hawaii just before said tour, Paul Sato of the Harvest Time Bluegrass Band filled in on bass. With Tate covering fiddle duties, the Japanese tour featured Tatsuya Imai of the Bluegrass 45 on bass for five shows, followed by Sab Watanabe for the final date. Upon their return to the US, the band played six shows with Randall Franks on bass.

Later in November, Dale Morris joined as Kenny Baker's replacement on fiddle, with Tate switching back to bass. Morris remained only until mid-March, leaving begrudgingly due to lack of income, with Glen Duncan taking his place. During May and June, the band recorded the album Bill Monroe and Stars of the Bluegrass Hall of Fame with a range of guests, including former BGB members Sonny Osborne, Carl Story, Mac Wiseman and Del McCoury. After a string of robberies and instances of criminal damage aimed at Monroe later in the year, Lewis briefly stepped back from the band in mid-January, arranging for Joe Stuart to cover a couple of shows. By mid-February, Duncan had left to work with other artists, with Art Stamper taking his place. His tenure lasted only four weeks, however, and by mid-March he had left again. Tate switched to fiddle for a few shows, before Buddy Spicher was enlisted for four recording sessions on March 17 and 18.

==== 1986–1996: Final shows, recordings, and Monroe's death ====
After the four sessions in March 1986, Tate switched back to fiddle while awaiting a permanent replacement, with former stand-in Johnny Montgomery returning as temporary bassist. When a new fiddler couldn't be found, however, Montgomery was made an official member of the BGB. Wayne Lewis left in May 1986 after the longest tenure of any guitarist in the group, replaced by Tom Ewing. The new lineup recorded the final track for their next album, Bluegrass '87, in August. Montgomery left after a final appearance on September 6 to work on his dairy farm; after stand-in appearances by Kenny Jones, Roy Huskey Jr. and Forrest Rose, Tate switched back to bass at the end of the month when Mark Squires was hired as the band's new fiddler. Squires lasted only until mid-November, when he was replaced by Billy Joe Foster. The band's lineup remained stable until the following August, when Foster took a leave of absence and was replaced by Mike Feagan. The new fiddler performed on Monroe's final album for MCA, Southern Flavor, which was recorded during January 1988. Along with Feagan, additional fiddles were performed by returning contributors Buddy Spicher and Bobby Hicks.

On March 27, 1988, Ewing left the BGB. His predecessor Wayne Lewis briefly returned as a stand-in, before Ewing rejoined on April 15, claiming he was "hooked" on being a part of the band. At the end of May, Billy Joe Foster returned from his leave of absence, replacing Mike Feagan. By September, however, the fiddler was forced to leave again to take care of his father. He was replaced by a series of temporary stand-ins — first, Blaine Sprouse played a few shows at the end of September; then Buddy Spicher filled in during October and November; and for a few shows in November, Tate switched to fiddle and Billy Rose returned on bass. Wayne Jerrolds took over officially from December 9, when Ewing handed in his second notice. He played until the end of the month, after which he was replaced by Scottie Baugus. The new lineup remained only until the end of March 1989, when Baugus and Jerrolds were replaced by the returning Ewing and Rose, with Tate switching back to fiddle.

With Ewing back in the lineup and Rose now an official member, the band recorded several performances on the Grand Ole Opry for the live album Live at the Opry. The lineup remained the same going into 1990, when Monroe and his band recorded what would be his last studio album, Cryin' Holy unto the Lord. Rose was dismissed at the end of August due to the arrival of new fiddler Jimmy Campbell, which saw Tate switch back to bass again. Williams left the following September, replaced by Dana Cupp. With Monroe's health worsening, the BGB performed less frequently than normal from 1991 onwards. On January 4, 1993, Campbell was fired due to alcohol abuse. Tate switched back to fiddle for "about a week", before Robert Bowlin took over from Campbell. The sole recording from Bowlin's tenure with the BGB was "Boston Boy", which was released on the 1994 compilation The Music of Bill Monroe. The lineup of Ewing, Cupp, Bowlin and Tate remained intact for the remainder of Monroe's life, save for a few shows during August 1993, June and November 1995 which featured stand-ins Ernie Sykes on bass and Mike Bub on banjo or bass. Sykes essentially took over as BGB bassist from November 1995, as Tate was often away due to his wife's illness; when he did play with the band, he joined Bowlin on fiddle. The band played their final show on the Grand Ole Opry on March 15, 1996.

Bill Monroe died on September 9, 1996. He spent much of his final few months alive in hospital and later a nursing home, unable to continue performing with his band. Following Monroe's death, Ewing joined David Davis and the Warrior River Boys, Cupp worked with the Osborne Brothers, Bowlin worked with various artists, and Tate joined the Cumberland Highlanders.

== Members ==
=== Official ===
| Image | Name (lifetime) | Years active (Note: Years active are detailed and with references cited in the history section.) | Instruments | Release contributions |
|---|---|---|---|---|
| | Bill Monroe (1911–1996) | 1938–1996 | mandolin; guitar (1938–1940); lead and tenor vocals | all Bill Monroe and the Blue Grass Boys (BGB) releases |
| | Bob "Handy" Jamieson (1916–2006) | 1938 | fiddle | none |
| | Bill "Cousin Wilbur" Wesbrooks (1911–1984) | 1938; 1940–1943 | guitar, lead vocals (1938); bass, tenor and occasional lead vocals (1940–1943) | all BGB releases from "Mule Skinner Blues" (1940) to "Back Up and Push" (1942) |
| | Charles "Chuck" Haire | 1938 | bass; guitar; lead vocals | none |
| | Cleo Davis (1919–1986) | 1938–1940 | guitar; mandolin; lead and bass vocals | The Music of Bill Monroe from 1936 to 1994 (1994) — one track, "Mule Skinner Blues" |
| | Art Wooten (1906–1986) | 1939–1940; 1941–1942 | fiddle; baritone and occasional lead vocals | "Blue Yodel No. 7 (Fox Trot)" (1941); "The Coupon Song" (1942); "Shake My Mother's Hand for Me" (1942); "Back Up and Push" (1942); The Music of Bill Monroe from 1936 to 1994 (1994) — one track, "Mule Skinner Blues" |
| | Tommy "Snowball" Millard (1911–1991) | 1939 | jug; bones; spoons | none |
| | Walter "Amos" Garren (1914–1977) | 1939–1940 | bass; tenor and occasional lead vocals | The Music of Bill Monroe from 1936 to 1994 (1994) — one track, "Mule Skinner Blues" |
| | Tommy Magness (1916–1972) | 1940–1941 (Note: Magness also appeared as a stand-in during early 1943.) | fiddle; baritone vocals | "Mule Skinner Blues" (1940); "Cryin' Holy unto the Lord" (1940); "Dog House Blues" (1941); "Tennessee Blues" (1941) |
| | Clyde Moody (1915–1989) | 1940–1941; 1942–1944 | guitar; mandolin (1940); lead and bass vocals | "Mule Skinner Blues" (1940); "Cryin' Holy unto the Lord" (1940); "Dog House Blues" (1941); "Tennessee Blues" (1941) |
| | Clarence "Mac" McGar | 1940 (Note: McGar also appeared as a stand-in during early 1943.) | fiddle | none |
| | Raymond "Pete" Pyle (1920–1995) | 1941–1942; 1951 | guitar; lead and bass vocals | "Blue Yodel No. 7 (Fox Trot)" (1941); "The Coupon Song" (1942); "Shake My Mother's Hand for Me" (1942); "Back Up and Push" (1942) |
| | Elliot "Curly" Bradshaw (1911–1958) | 1941; 1943–1945 | guitar; harmonica; occasional vocals | "Rocky Road Blues" (1946); "True Life Blues" (1946); "Blue Moon of Kentucky" (1947) — B-side "Goodbye Old Pal" only; "Blue Grass Special" (1947) — A-side only |
| | Jay Hugh Hall (1910–1971) | 1942 | guitar; backing vocals | none |
| | Howard "Howdy" Forrester (1922–1987) | 1942–1943; 1945–1946 | fiddle | Bean Blossom (1973) |
| | David "Stringbean" Akeman (1915–1973) | 1942–1945; 1945 | banjo; baritone vocals | "Rocky Road Blues" (1946); "True Life Blues" (1946); "Blue Moon of Kentucky" (1947) — B-side "Goodbye Old Pal" only; "Blue Grass Special" (1947) — A-side only |
| | Carl Story (1916–1995) | 1942–1943 | fiddle; baritone vocals | Bill Monroe and Stars of the Bluegrass Hall of Fame (1985) |
| | Robert "Chubby" Wise (1915–1996) | 1943–1945; 1946–1948; 1949–1950 | fiddle; occasional guitar | all BGB releases from "Rocky Road Blues" (1946) to "Can't You Hear Me Callin'" (1950) |
| | Wilene "Sally Ann" Forrester (1922–1999) | 1943–1946 | accordion; tenor and occasional lead vocals | "Rocky Road Blues" (1946); "True Life Blues" (1946); "Blue Moon of Kentucky" (1947) — B-side "Goodbye Old Pal" only; "Blue Grass Special" (1947) — A-side only |
| | Howard "Cedric Rainwater" Watts (1913–1970) | 1943–1948 (with multiple leaves of absence) (Note: Watts also appeared as a session musician in July 1951.) | bass; bass and occasional baritone vocals | all BGB releases from "Rocky Road Blues" (1946) to "I'm Going Back to Old Kentucky" (1949); "I'll Meet You in Church Sunday Morning" (1951) — B-side "Get Down on Your Knees and Pray" only; "Highway of Sorrow" (1951) — B-side "Sugar Coated Love" only; "Country Waltz" (1953) — B-side "Cabin of Love" only |
| | Jimmy "Tex" Willis | 1944–1945 | guitar; lead and tenor vocals | "Rocky Road Blues" (1946); "True Life Blues" (1946); "Blue Moon of Kentucky" (1947) — B-side "Goodbye Old Pal" only; "Blue Grass Special" (1947) — A-side only |
| | Lester Flatt (1914–1979) | 1945–1948 | guitar; lead and tenor vocals | all BGB releases from "Mansions for Me" (1947) to "I'm Going Back to Old Kentucky" (1949) |
| | Jim Shumate (1921–2013) | 1945 | fiddle; bass vocals | none |
| | Jim Andrews | 1945 | tenor banjo | none |
| | Earl Scruggs (1924–2012) | 1945–1948 | banjo; baritone vocals | all BGB releases from "Mansions for Me" (1947) to "I'm Going Back to Old Kentucky" (1949) |
| | Benny Martin (1928–2001) | 1948–1949 (Note: Martin also appeared as a session musician in November 1959.) | fiddle; bass vocals | "Lonesome Wind Blues" (1960) |
| | Joel Price (1910–1999) | 1948–1949; 1949–1951 | bass; baritone and occasional bass vocals | all BGB releases from "New Mule Skinner Blues" (1950) to "Poison Love" (1951); "I'll Meet You in Church Sunday Morning" (1951) — A-side only; "Travelin' Blues" (1951); "Letter from My Darlin'" (1952); "First Whippoorwill" (1952) — B-side "I'm on My Way to the Old Home" only; "When the Cactus Is in Bloom" (1952) — A-side only |
| | Claude "Jackie" Phelps (1925–1990) | 1948–1949; 1954–1955; 1956 (Note: Phelps also appeared as a stand-in during fall 1958, and as a session musician in March 1963 and April 1964.) | guitar; baritone and lead vocals; steel guitar (early); banjo (1955) | "Cheyenne" (1955); "Wheel Hoss" — A-side only; "You'll Find Her Name Written There" (1957) — A-side only; "Mary at the Home Place" (1964) — B-side "Shenandoah Breakdown" only; Bluegrass Instrumentals (1965); Kentucky Blue Grass (1970); Road of Life (1974); Classic Bluegrass Instrumentals (1987) |
| | Don Reno (1926–1984) | 1948–1949 | banjo; guitar; tenor, baritone and lead vocals | Off the Record, Volume 1: Live Recordings 1956–1969 (1993) |
| | Homer "Jim" Eanes Jr. (1923–1995) | 1948 | guitar; lead and tenor vocals | none |
| | Doyle Wright (1928–2006) | 1948 | guitar; lead and tenor vocals | none |
| | Malcolm "Mac" Wiseman (1925–2019) | 1949 | guitar; lead and tenor vocals | "The Girl in the Blue Velvet Band" (1949); "Can't You Hear Me Callin'" (1950); Bill Monroe and Stars of the Bluegrass Hall of Fame (1985); Cryin' Holy unto the Lord (1991) |
| | Mack Carger (1919–2014) | 1949 | bass; backing vocals | none |
| | Gene Christian (1926–2013) | 1949 | fiddle | none |
| | Rudy Lyle (1930–1985) | 1949–1951; 1953–1954 (Note: Lyle also appeared as a stand-in during May 1956 and August 1960.) | banjo; baritone vocals | all BGB releases from "The Girl in the Blue Velvet Band" (1949) to "When the Cactus Is in Bloom" (1952), except "Prisoner's Song" and "Christmas Time's A-Comin'"; "Changing Partners" (1954); "Wishing Waltz" (1954); "White House Blues" (1954); "On and On" (1956); "You'll Find Her Name Written There" (1957) — B-side "Sittin' Alone in the Moonlight" only; "Devil's Dream" (1963) — B-side "New John Henry Blues" only |
| | Jack Thompson | 1949 | bass | "The Girl in the Blue Velvet Band" (1949); "Can't You Hear Me Callin'" (1950) |
| | Jimmy Martin (1927–2005) | 1949–1951; 1952–1954 | guitar; lead and tenor vocals | all BGB releases from "New Mule Skinner Blues" (1950) to "Poison Love" (1951), and from "Letter from My Darlin'" (1952) to "Happy on My Way" (1954); "I'll Meet You in Church Sunday Morning" (1951) — A-side only; "Travelin' Blues" (1951); "I'm Working on a Building" (1954); "On and On" (1956); "You'll Find Her Name Written There" (1957) — B-side "Sittin' Alone in the Moonlight" only; "Devil's Dream" (1963) — B-side "New John Henry Blues" only; Kentucky Blue Grass (1970) |
| | Vassar Clements (1928–2005) | 1950; 1955–1956; 1961 (Note: Clements also appeared as a session musician in November 1967.) | fiddle; baritone vocals | "New Mule Skinner Blues" (1950); "The Old Fiddler" (1950); "Boat of Love" (1950); "Memories of You" (1950); "First Whippoorwill" (1952) — B-side "I'm on My Way to the Old Home" only; Bluegrass Ramble (1962); Bluegrass Instrumentals (1965); "Train 45" (1968) |
| | Merle "Red" Taylor (1927–1987) | 1950; 1958 (Note: Taylor also appeared as a stand-in during 1954 and 1955.) | fiddle; baritone vocals | "When the Golden Leaves Begin to Fall" (1950); "Poison Love" (1951); "Letter from My Darlin'" (1952); "When the Cactus Is in Bloom" (1952) — A-side only; "Blue Moon of Kentucky" (1954); "Wheel Hoss" (1955) — B-side "Put My Little Shoes Away" only |
| | Gordon Terry (1931–2006) | 1950–1951; 1951–1952; 1957 (Note: Terry also appeared as a stand-in during January 1953, 1954, 1955 and early 1960, and as a session musician in February 1958 and December 1970.) | fiddle; bass vocals | "Rotation Blues" (1951); "Highway of Sorrow" (1951) — B-side "Sugar Coated Love" only; "Christmas Time's A-Comin'" (1951); "First Whippoorwill" (1952) – A-side only; "Blue Moon of Kentucky" (1954); "Wheel Hoss" (1954) — B-side "Put My Little Shoes Away" only; "Four Walls" (1957); Knee Deep in Blue Grass (1958); I Saw the Light (1958); Bluegrass Instrumentals (1965); Bill Monroe's Country Music Hall of Fame (1971); "Goin' Up Caney" (1971); "My Old Kentucky and You" (1972) — B-side "Lonesome Moonlight Waltz" only; Bean Blossom (1973) |
| | James "Hal" Smith (1923–2008) | 1951 | fiddle | "Highway of Sorrow" (1951) — A-side only; "Travelin' Blues" (1951); "When the Cactus Is in Bloom" (1952) — B-side "Sailor's Plea" only |
| | Vic Daniels (1925–1988) | 1951 | guitar; lead and tenor vocals | none |
| | Bessie Lee Mauldin (1920–1983) | 1951–1953; 1953–1954; 1955–1958; 1958–1964 | bass | all BGB releases from "Four Walls" (1957) to Blue Grass Time (1967); Kentucky Blue Grass (1970); Road of Life (1974); Classic Bluegrass Instrumentals (1985) |
| | Carter Stanley (1925–1966) | 1951 | guitar; lead and tenor vocals | "Rotation Blues" (1951); "I'll Meet You in Church Sunday Morning" (1951) — B-side "Get Down on Your Knees and Pray" only; "Highway of Sorrow" (1951) — B-side "Sugar Coated Love" only; "Country Waltz" (1953) — B-side "Cabin of Love" only |
| | Joe Drumright (1929–1996) | 1951 (Note: Drumright also appeared as a stand-in during fall 1958, and as a session musician in November 1959 and January 1964.) | banjo; baritone vocals | "Panhandle Country" (1958); "Lonesome Wind Blues" (1960); I'll Meet You in Church Sunday Morning (1964); "Mary at the Home Place" (1964) — A-side only; Saturday Night at the Grand Ole Opry, Vol. 2 (1964); Blue Grass Time (1967) |
| | Oscar "Shorty" Shehan (1923–1983) | 1951 (Note: Shehan also appeared as a stand-in on fiddle during summer 1961.) | bass | "Christmas Time's A-Comin'" (1951); "First Whippoorwill" (1952) — A-side only |
| | South Salyer (1927–2000) | 1951 | guitar; lead and tenor vocals | none |
| | Edd Mayfield (1926–1958) | 1951–1952; 1954; 1958 (Note: Mayfield also appeared as a stand-in during September 1956.) | guitar; lead and tenor vocals | "Christmas Time's A-Comin'" (1951); "First Whippoorwill" (1952) — A-side only; "Blue Moon of Kentucky" (1954); "Wheel Hoss" (1954) — B-side "Put My Little Shoes Away" only; I Saw the Light (1958); "Panhandle Country" (1958) |
| | James "Gar" Bowers (1927–2003) | 1951–1952 | banjo | "Christmas Time's A-Comin'" (1951); "First Whippoorwill" (1952) — A-side only |
| | Charlie Cline (1931–2004) | 1952–1953; 1953–1954; 1954–1955 (Note: Cline also appeared as a stand-in during fall 1958.) | fiddle; banjo (1954–1955; guitar (1955); baritone and lead (1955) vocals | all BGB releases from "A Mighty Pretty Waltz" (1952) to "You'll Find Her Name Written There" (1957); "Devil's Dream" (1963) — B-side "New John Henry Blues" only; Bluegrass Instrumentals (1965) |
| | Larry Richardson (1927–2007) | 1952 | banjo; tenor vocals | none |
| | Billy Price (1934–2000) | 1952 | guitar; lead and tenor vocals | none |
| | Roland "Sonny" Osborne (1937–2021) | 1952; 1953 | banjo; baritone vocals | "A Mighty Pretty Waltz" (1952); "Footprints in the Snow" (1952); "Country Waltz" (1953) — A-side only; "The Little Girl and the Dreadful Snake" (1953); Bill Monroe and Stars of the Bluegrass Hall of Fame (1985); Cryin' Holy unto the Lord (1991) |
| | Jim Smoak | 1952–1953; 1954 | banjo; backing vocals | "Wheel Hoss" (1955) — B-side "Put My Little Shoes Away" only |
| | Luther "L. E." White (1930–2004) | 1953 | fiddle; backing vocals | none |
| | Leslie Sandy (1928–2022) | 1953; 1954 (Note: Sandy also appeared as a session musician on guitar in May 1957.) | bass | Knee Deep in Blue Grass (1958) |
| | Bobby Atkins (1933–2022) | 1954; 1961 | banjo; baritone vocals | none |
| | Arnice "Jack" Youngblood (1922–2007) | 1954 | fiddle | none |
| | Bobby Hicks (1933–2024) | 1954–1956|1958–1959 (Note: Hicks also appeared as a session musician in January 1988.) | fiddle; bass (late-1954); banjo (1955); bass vocals | "Cheyenne" (1955); "Wheel Hoss" (1955) — A-side only; "You'll Find Her Name Written There" (1957) — A-side only; "Panhandle Country" (1958); "Gotta Travel On" (1958); "Dark as the Night, Blue as the Day" (1959); Bluegrass Instrumentals (1965); Bill Monroe and the Stars of the Bluegrass Hall of Fame (1985); Bluegrass '87 (1987); Southern Flavor (1988) |
| | Carlos Brock (1934–2016) | 1955 | guitar; lead and tenor vocals | none |
| | Noah Crase (1934–2010) | 1955 (Note: Crase also appeared as a stand-in during June 1956.) | banjo; baritone vocals | none |
| | Joe Stuart (1928–1987) | 1955–1958; 1959; 1963; 1970–1973 (Note: Stuart also appeared as a stand-in during summer 1960, between late-1962 and early-1963, and in early-January 1986; and as a session musician in March and October 1976.) | banjo; guitar; fiddle; bass; baritone and lead vocals | "Four Walls" (1957); Knee Deep in Blue Grass (1958); Bluegrass Special (1963); all BGB releases from I'll Meet You in Church Sunday Morning (1964) to Blue Grass Time (1967), and from Kentucky Bluegrass (1970) to Bill Monroe Sings Bluegrass, Body and Soul (1977), except Bean Blossom (1973); Bill Monroe and Friends (1984) |
| | Arnold Terry (1933–2022) | 1955–1956 | guitar; lead and tenor vocals | none |
| | Lucky Saylor (1925–2010) | 1956 | guitar; lead and tenor vocals | none |
| | Yates Green (1923–2016) | 1956 | guitar; lead and tenor vocals | none |
| | Roger Smith (1926–2013) | 1956; 1958 | banjo, guitar (1956); fiddle, banjo (1958); baritone vocals | none |
| | Clarence "Tater" Tate (1931–2007) | 1956–1957; 1984–1996 | fiddle (1956–1957, 1986, 1989–1990, 1995–1996); bass (1984–1986, 1986–1989, 1990–1995); bass vocals | Bean Blossom (1973); Bill Monroe and the Stars of the Bluegrass Hall of Fame (1985); Bluegrass '87 (1987); Southern Flavor (1988); Live at the Opry (1989); Cryin' Holy unto the Lord (1991); The Music of Bill Monroe from 1936 to 1994 (1994) — one new track, "Boston Boy" |
| | Enos Johnson (1928–2009) | 1956 | guitar; lead and tenor vocals | none |
| | Ralph "Joe" Meadows (1931–2003) | 1956–1957 | fiddle; bass vocals | Bean Blossom (1973) |
| | Carl Vanover | 1956–1957 | guitar; lead and tenor vocals | none |
| | Don Stover (1928–1996) | 1957 | banjo; lead and tenor vocals | "Four Walls" (1957); Knee Deep in Blue Grass (1958) |
| | Kenny Baker (1926–2011) | 1957–1958; 1962–1963; 1968–1984 (Note: Baker also appeared as a stand-in during July/August 1959.) | fiddle; baritone vocals | Knee Deep in Blue Grass (1958); I Saw the Light (1958); "Panhandle Country" (1958); all BGB releases from Bluegrass Special (1963) to Bluegrass Instrumentals (1965), and from "Crossing the Cumberlands" (1969) to Bill Monroe Sings Bluegrass, Body and Soul (1977); Bean Blossom '79 (1980); Master of Bluegrass (1981); Bill Monroe and Friends (1984); Classic Bluegrass Instrumentals (1987) |
| | Ernie Graves | 1957 | guitar; lead and tenor vocals | none |
| | Bill "Chum" Duncan (1929–2013) | 1957 | guitar; lead and tenor vocals | none |
| | Earl Snead (1939–2002) | 1958; 1971 (Note: Snead also appeared as a stand-in on bass during late-December 1969 and early 1970.) | banjo | Bill Monroe's Country Music Hall of Fame (1971) |
| | Eddie Adcock (1938–2025) | 1958 | banjo; baritone vocals | none |
| | Vernon "Jack" Cooke (1936–2009) | 1958–1959 (Note: Cooke also appeared as a stand-in during February 1963, August/September 1964, and November 1974.) | guitar; lead and tenor vocals | "Gotta Travel On" (1958); "Dark as the Night, Blue as the Day" (1958); "Lonesome Wind Blues" (1960); Bluegrass Instrumentals (1965) |
| | Robert Lee "Buddy" Pennington (1940–1977) | 1958–1959 | banjo | "Gotta Travel On" (1958); "Dark as the Night, Blue as the Day" (1958); Bluegrass Instrumentals (1965) |
| | Charlie Smith | 1959; 1962 (Note: Smith also appeared as a stand-in on guitar during 1958.) | fiddle | "Dark as the Night, Blue as the Day" (1958); Bluegrass Instrumentals (1965) |
| | Dale Potter (1929–1996) | 1959–1960 (Note: Potter also appeared as a stand-in during early 1954, and as a session musician in May 1957.) | fiddle | Knee Deep in Blue Grass (1958); "Lonesome Wind Blues" (1960); Mr. Blue Grass (1961) |
| | Tony Ellis | 1960–1961; 1962 | banjo; bass; baritone vocals | Mr. Blue Grass (1961); Bluegrass Ramble (1962); Bluegrass Special (1963); I'll Meet You in Church Sunday Morning (1964); Road of Life (1974) |
| | Frank Buchanan (1934–2012) | 1960; 1962 | guitar; lead and tenor vocals | Bluegrass Special (1963); I'll Meet You in Church Sunday Morning (1964); Road of Life (1974) |
| | Bobby Smith (1937–1992) | 1960–1961 (Note: Smith also appeared as a stand-in during May 1964.) | guitar; lead and tenor vocals | none |
| | Billy Baker | 1961; 1963; 1964 (Note: Baker also appeared as a stand-in during summer 1960.) | fiddle; baritone vocals | none |
| | Curtis McPeake (1927–2021) | 1961–1962 (Note: McPeake also appeared as a stand-in during October 1959, and as a session musician in November/December 1960.) | banjo | Mr. Blue Grass (1961); Bluegrass Ramble (1962) |
| | Jimmy Maynard (1928–2015) | 1961–1962 (Note: Maynard also appeared as a session musician in February 1964, and as a stand-in during May and August/September 1964.) | guitar; lead and tenor vocals | Bluegrass Ramble (1962) |
| | Horace "Benny" Williams (1931–2007) | 1961–1962; 1964–1965; 1967 (Note: Williams also appeared as a session musician in March 1963.) | fiddle; guitar; baritone and occasional lead vocals | Bluegrass Ramble (1962); Bluegrass Special (1963); "Devil's Dream" (1963) — A-side only; "Darling Corey" (1964); I'll Meet You in Church Sunday Morning (1964); "Mary at the Home Place" (1964) — A-side only; Saturday Night at the Grand Ole Opry, Vol. 2 (1964); Bluegrass Instrumentals (1965); "I Live in the Past" (1965); Blue Grass Time (1967); "Train 45" (1968); Kentucky Blue Grass (1970); Road of Life (1974) |
| | Norman "Buddy" Spicher | 1961–1962 (Note: Phelps also appeared as a session musician in February and April 1964, March 1965, January 1971, July 1977, March 1986, and January 1988, and as a stand-in during October and November 1988.) | fiddle | Bluegrass Ramble (1962); "I Live in the Past" (1965); Blue Grass Time (1967); Kentucky Blue Grass (1970); Uncle Pen (1972); Road of Life (1974); Bill Monroe Sings Bluegrass, Body and Soul (1977); Bluegrass Memories (1977); Bill Monroe and Friends (1984); Bluegrass '87 (1987); Southern Flavor (1988) |
| | Harold "Red" Stanley (1922–1967) | 1962 | fiddle; baritone vocals | Bluegrass Special (1963); I'll Meet You in Church Sunday Morning (1964); Road of Life (1974) |
| | David Deese (1941–2011) | 1962 (Note: Deese also appeared as a stand-in for a show on September 3, 1965.) | banjo; baritone vocals | none |
| | Lonnie Hoppers (1935–2024) | 1962–1963 (Note: Hoppers also appeared as a stand-in during 1957 and 1960.) | banjo; baritone vocals | Bluegrass Special (1963); "Darling Corey" (1964); I'll Meet You in Church Sunday Morning (1963); "Cindy" (1965); Road of Life (1974) |
| | Del McCoury | 1963–1964 (Note: McCoury also appeared as a stand-in for a show on April 2, 1965.) | guitar; lead and tenor vocals | I'll Meet You in Church Sunday Morning (1964); Blue Grass Time (1967); Bill Monroe and Stars of the Bluegrass Hall of Fame (1985); Bluegrass '87 (1987) |
| | Bill "Brad" Keith (1939–2015) | 1963 (Note: Keith also appeared as a stand-in during October 1964 and April 1965.) | banjo; tenor vocals | "Devil's Dream" (1963) — A-side only; "Darling Corey" (1964) — A-side only; "Mary at the Home Place" (1964) — B-side "Shenandoah Breakdown" only; Bluegrass Instrumentals (1965); Blue Grass Time (1967); Classic Bluegrass Instrumentals (1987) |
| | Sandy Rothman | 1964 | guitar; lead and tenor vocals | none |
| | Steve Arkin (1944–2022) | 1964 | banjo | none |
| | Don Lineberger (1939–2010) | 1964–1965 | banjo | "I Live in the Past" (1965); Kentucky Blue Grass (1970) |
| | Jimmy Elrod (1939–2009) | 1964–1965 (Note: Elrod also appeared on banjo as a session musician in December 1957, and as a stand-in during June 1964.) | guitar; lead and tenor vocals | Knee Deep in Blue Grass (1958); "I Live in the Past" (1965); Kentucky Blue Grass (1970) |
| | James Monroe | 1964–1971 (Note: Monroe also appeared as a session musician in March and October 1976.) | bass, tenor vocals (until 1969); guitar, lead vocals (from 1969) | all BGB releases from "I Live in the Past" (1965) to Bluegrass Memories (1977) |
| | Peter Rowan | 1965–1967 | guitar; lead and tenor vocals | Blue Grass Time (1967); Kentucky Blue Grass (1970); Classic Bluegrass Instrumentals (1987) |
| | Gene Lowinger | 1965–1966 (Note: Lowinger also appeared as a stand-in during October 1964.) | fiddle | none |
| | Lamar Grier (1938–2019) | 1965–1967; 1967 | banjo; baritone vocals | Blue Grass Time (1967); Kentucky Blue Grass (1970); Classic Bluegrass Instrumentals (1987) |
| | Richard Greene | 1966–1967 | fiddle; bass vocals | Blue Grass Time (1967); Kentucky Blue Grass (1970); Classic Bluegrass Instrumentals (1987) |
| | Byron Berline (1944–2021) | 1967 | fiddle; bass vocals | "Virginia Darlin'" (1968); Kentucky Blue Grass (1970) |
| | Curtis Blackwell | 1967 | guitar; lead and tenor vocals | none |
| | Doug Green | 1967; 1969 (Note: Green also appeared as a stand-in on bass for a show on September 29, 1968.) | guitar, lead vocals (1967); bass, baritone vocals (1969) | none |
| | Roland White (1938–2022) | 1967–1969 | guitar; lead and baritone vocals | "Train 45" (1968); "Virginia Darlin'" (1968); "Crossing the Cumberlands" (1969); Kentucky Blue Grass (1970) |
| | Joseph "Butch" Robins | 1967; 1977–1981 (Note: Robins also appeared as a stand-in for a show on June 28, 1969.) | banjo; baritone vocals | Bean Blossom '79 (1980); Master of Bluegrass (1981) |
| | Vic Jordan (1938–2016) | 1967–1969 | banjo | "Train 45" (1968); "Virginia Darlin'" (1968); "Crossing the Cumberlands" (1969); Kentucky Blue Grass (1970) |
| | Rual Yarbrough (1930–2010) | 1969–1970 (Note: Yarbrough also appeared as a stand-in during January/February 1963.) | banjo; baritone vocals | "Fireball Mail" (1969); "Walk Softly on My Heart" (1970); Kentucky Blue Grass (1970); "Goin' Up Caney" (1971) — A-side only; Uncle Pen (1972); Road of Life (1974) |
| | Bill Yates (1936–2015) | 1969 | bass; bass and occasional lead vocals | "Walk Softly on My Heart" (1970) — A-side only; "Goin' Up Caney" (1971) — A-side only; Uncle Pen (1972) |
| | William "Skip" Payne | 1970 | bass; bass vocals | none |
| | Roby "R. C." Harris (1940–2023) | 1970–1971; 1971 (Note: Harris also appeared as a stand-in during July 1981.) | banjo; baritone vocals | none |
| | Travis Stewart (1935–2021) | 1971 | bass, tenor vocals (initially); guitar, lead and tenor vocals | none |
| | Jack Hicks | 1971–1973 | banjo | "My Old Kentucky and You" (1972) — A-side only; Bean Blossom (1973) |
| | Doug Hutchens | 1971 | bass | none |
| | Dan Jones (1939–2017) | 1971 | guitar; lead and tenor vocals | none |
| | Monroe Fields (1928–2015) | 1971–1973 | bass; baritone vocals | "My Old Kentucky and You" (1972) — A-side only |
| | Bob Fowler | 1973 | guitar; lead and tenor vocals | Bean Blossom (1973) |
| | Guy Stevenson (1929–2019) | bass | 1973 (Note: Stevenson also appeared as a stand-in during April and May 1953.) | Bean Blossom (1973) |
| | Ben Pedigo | 1973 | banjo; backing vocals | none |
| | Jim Moratto | 1973–1974 | banjo; backing vocals | none |
| | Randy Davis (1954–2019) | 1974–1979 | bass; baritone vocals | The Weary Traveler (1976); Bill Monroe Sings Bluegrass, Body and Soul (1977); Bluegrass Memories (1977); Bean Blossom '79 (1980) |
| | Ralph Lewis (1928–2017) | 1974–1976 | guitar; lead and tenor vocals; occasional fiddle | Weary Traveler (1976) |
| | Dwight Dillman | 1974 | banjo | none |
| | Bob Black | 1974–1976 | banjo; baritone vocals | Weary Traveler (1976) |
| | Bob Jones | 1976 | guitar; lead and tenor vocals | none |
| | Wayne Lewis | 1976–1986 (Note: Lewis also filled in during early-April 1988.) | guitar; lead and tenor vocals | all BGB releases from Bill Monroe Sings Bluegrass, Body and Soul (1977) to Bluegrass '87 (1987) |
| | Bill Holden (1950–2021) | 1976–1977; 1977 | banjo; baritone vocals | Bill Monroe Sings Bluegrass, Body and Soul (1977); Bluegrass Memories (1977) |
| | Larry Beasley | none | banjo; baritone vocals | |
| | Mark Hembree | 1979–1984 | bass; bass vocals | Master of Bluegrass (1981); Bill Monroe and Friends (1984) |
| | Blake Williams | 1981–1991 | banjo; baritone vocals | all BGB releases from Bill Monroe and Friends (1984) to Cryin' Holy unto the Lord (1991) |
| | Dale Morris | 1984–1985 | fiddle; backing vocals | none |
| | Glen Duncan | 1985–1986 | fiddle; backing vocals | Bill Monroe and Stars of the Bluegrass Hall of Fame (1985); Bluegrass '87 (1987) |
| | Art Stamper (1933–2005) | 1986 | fiddle; backing vocals | none |
| | Johnny Montgomery (1928–2015) | 1986–1987 (Note: Montgomery also appeared as a stand-in on November 1, 1974.) | bass | Bluegrass '87 |
| | Tom Ewing | 1986–1988; 1988; 1989–1996 | guitar; lead and baritone vocals | Bluegrass '87 (1987); Southern Flavor (1988); Live at the Opry (1989); Cryin' Holy unto the Lord (1991) |
| | Mark Squires | 1986 | fiddle; backing vocals | none |
| | Billy Joe Foster (1961–2013) | 1986–1987; 1988 | fiddle; backing vocals | none |
| | Mike Feagan | 1987–1988 | fiddle; backing vocals | Southern Flavor (1988) |
| | Wayne Jerrolds | 1988–1989 | fiddle | none |
| | Scottie Baugus | 1989 | guitar; lead vocals | none |
| | Billy Rose | 1989–1990 (Note: Rose also appeared as a stand-in during late-February and November 1988.) | bass; baritone vocals | Live at the Opry (1989); Cryin' Holy unto the Lord (1991) |
| | Jimmy Campbell (1963–2003) | 1990–1993 (Note: Campbell also appeared as a guest at a show on October 28, 1989.) | fiddle; backing vocals | Cryin' Holy unto the Lord (1991) |
| | Dana Cupp | 1991–1996 | banjo; backing vocals | The Music of Bill Monroe from 1936 to 1994 (1994) — one track, "Boston Boy" |
| | Robert Bowlin | 1993–1996 | fiddle; backing vocals | The Music of Bill Monroe from 1936 to 1994 (1994) — one track, "Boston Boy" |
| | Ernie Sykes | 1995–1996 (Note: Sykes also appeared as a stand-in during August 1993.) | bass; backing vocals | none |

=== Stand-in ===
| Image | Name (lifetime) | Years active | Instruments | Details |
|---|---|---|---|---|
| | Floyd Ethridge (1908–1981) | 1943; 1949 | fiddle | Ethridge filled in during early 1943 after Howdy Forrester left, and June 1949 after Benny Martin left. |
| | Andy "Bijou" Boyette (1913–1989) | 1945 | bass; additional guitar | Boyette filled in for Howard Watts during a leave of absence between March and April 1945. |
| | Birch Monroe (1901–1982) | 1945–1947 | bass; fiddle; bass vocals | Monroe filled in for Watts during his second leave of absence, from July to November 1945. He continued touring with the band, providing additional fiddle on occasion, and later filled in for Watts again from November 1946 to September 1947. Monroe also performed on several tracks recorded throughout the BGB's career. |
| | Joe Forrester (1919–2011) | 1945–1946 | bass | Forrester joined when brother Howdy returned in November 1945, both remaining until March 1946. |
| | James "Chick" Stripling (1916–1970) | 1947 | bass; bass vocals | Stripling was brought in during the spring of 1947 to share stand-in bass duties with Birch Monroe. |
| | Tommy Goad | 1948 | banjo | Goad and McCraw each filled in during late-February 1948, following Earl Scruggs' departure. |
| | Lloyd McCraw | 1948 | banjo | Goad and McCraw each filled in during late-February 1948, following Earl Scruggs' departure. |
| | Stan Hankinson | 1949 | guitar; backing vocals | Hankinson filled in during March and April 1949, following Jackie Phelps' departure. |
| | Vern Young | 1951 | guitar; lead vocals | Young stood in for around a week in late-January 1951 when Jimmy Martin was unavailable. |
| | Manuel "Old Joe" Clark (1922–1998) | 1951; 1951–1952 | banjo (1951); bass (1951–1952) | Clark briefly filled in for Rudy Lyle in August 1951, then after Shorty Shehan left in December. |
| | Ralph Stanley (1927–2016) | 1951 | banjo | Stanley followed Clark in filling in for the departed Rudy Lyle during mid–late-August 1951. |
| | Darrell "Pee Wee" Lambert (1924–1965) | 1951 | mandolin; tenor vocals | Lambert stood in briefly in August 1951 when Monroe was forced to cover for the ill Carter Stanley. |
| | Johnny Vipperman (1929–2007) | 1951 | banjo; mandolin | Vipperman stood in for Joe Drumright on September 10, 1951, and played mandolin three days later. |
| | Carlton Haney (1928–2011) | 1954 | bass | While Bessie Lee Mauldin needed support, Haney, van Winkle and Day assisted on bass during 1954. |
| | "Little" Robert van Winkle (real name Ralph Guenther) | 1954 | bass | While Bessie Lee Mauldin needed support, Haney, van Winkle and Day assisted on bass during 1954. |
| | "Lazy" Jim Day (1911–1959) | 1954 | bass | While Bessie Lee Mauldin needed support, Haney, van Winkle and Day assisted on bass during 1954. |
| | Tommy Williams | 1956 | fiddle | Williams filled in during mid-September 1956, following Bobby Hicks' departure. |
| | Bob Metzel | 1956; 1957 | guitar; lead vocals | Metzel filled in during October 1956 when Jackie Phelps left, and January 1957 after Carl Vanover left. |
| | Henry "Jack" Paget (1917–2010) | 1957 | bass | Paget, an opening act on Monroe's July–October 1957 tour, occasionally filled in for Mauldin. |
| | John Hartford (1937–2001) | 1957 | banjo | Hartford filled in for Joe Stuart during an unknown date in 1957. |
| | Melvin Goins (1933–2016) | 1958; 1962 | guitar (1958); bass (1962) | The Goins brothers stood in with the BGB for shows during two summers, in 1958 and 1962. |
| | Ray Goins (1936–2007) | 1958; 1962 | banjo | The Goins brothers stood in with the BGB for shows during two summers, in 1958 and 1962. |
| | Robert "Red" Cravens (1932–2021) | 1958; 1960 | guitar; lead vocals | Cravens and the Bray Brothers filled in at shows during June 1958 and the summer of 1960. |
| | Harley Bray | 1958; 1960 | banjo | Cravens and the Bray Brothers filled in at shows during June 1958 and the summer of 1960. |
| | Francis Bray | 1958; 1960 | bass | Cravens and the Bray Brothers filled in at shows during June 1958 and the summer of 1960. |
| | Billy Edwards (1936–2005) | 1958 | bass | Edwards filled in for a show in July 1958 alongside then-bandmates Ray and Melvin Goins. |
| | Bill Emerson (1938–2021) | 1958 | banjo | Emerson and Gately, alongside multiple BGB alumni, were stand-in members during the fall of 1958. |
| | Connie Gately | 1958 | guitar; lead vocals | Emerson and Gately, alongside multiple BGB alumni, were stand-in members during the fall of 1958. |
| | Henry "Tommy" Vaden (1925–2004) | 1958 | bass | Vaden stood in for Bessie Lee Mauldin at a string of four shows over the Christmas 1958 period. |
| | Bob Mavian (1936–2013) | 1958 | banjo | Mavian filled in on banjo at various Grand Ole Opry performances during unknown dates in 1958. |
| | Tom Gray | 1959; 1969 | bass | Gray filled in at shows during the summer of 1959 and an unknown date in 1969. |
| | Ted Lundy (1937–1980) | 1959 | banjo | Lundy filled in for Buddy Pennington/Joe Stuart during an unknown date in 1959. |
| | Jimmy Byrd | 1960 | guitar; lead vocals | Byrd filled in for a tour in January 1960 following Jack Cooke's late-1959 departure. |
| | Porter Church (1934–1995) | 1960 | banjo; guitar; lead vocals | Church played banjo at a few shows in early-August 1960, then guitar during mid-August. |
| | Roger Drake | 1960 | fiddle | Drake filled in for at one show on August 9, 1960, following Dale Potter's departure. |
| | Danny Cline | 1960 | bass | Cline performed bass at the Blue Grass Day festival in mid-August 1960. |
| | Charles "Buck" Trent (1938–2023) | 1960/1961 | banjo | Trent filled in on banjo during unknown dates in either 1960 or 1961. |
| | Neil Rosenberg | 1961; 1965 | banjo; baritone vocals | Rosenberg filled in on September 24 and October 22, 1961, and in September 1965. |
| | Howard Aldridge | 1962; 1969 | banjo | Aldridge filled in on two occasions, on an unknown date in 1962 and on March 21, 1969. |
| | Jake Landers (1938–2018) | 1963 | guitar; lead vocals | Landers joined temporarily for a brief period in late-January/early-February 1963. |
| | Buddy Pendleton (1935–2017) | 1963 | fiddle | After Kenny Baker left in May 1963, Pendleton and Sage each filled in on fiddle at various shows. |
| | Bill Sage | 1963 | fiddle | After Kenny Baker left in May 1963, Pendleton and Sage each filled in on fiddle at various shows. |
| | Jim Bessire | 1963 | bass | Bessire filled in on bass at two shows in 1963: the first on June 2, the second on September 22. |
| | Ralph Rinzler (1934–1994) | 1963 | bass | Rinzler performed bass alongside Bessie Lee Mauldin at a show on July 26, 1963. |
| | Ry Cooder | 1963 | banjo | Cooder filled in on banjo during December 1963 following the departure of Bill Keith. |
| | Bobby Diamond | 1963; 1964 | banjo (1963); bass (1964) | Diamond filled in on banjo in December 1963, and on bass in September 1964. |
| | Ken Marvin (real name Lloyd George) (1924–1991) | 1964 | bass; backing vocals | Following Bessie Lee Mauldin's departure, Marvin filled in on bass during shows in the summer of 1964. |
| | Bruce Weathers | 1964 | banjo | Weathers filled in on banjo at the BGB's Bean Blossom performance on May 24, 1964. |
| | Gene Roberts | 1964 | banjo | Prior to the arrival of Steve Arkin, Roberts filled in on banjo at a few shows in late-June/July 1964. |
| | Kelly McCormick | 1964 | guitar; lead vocals | McCormick and Thurmond were amongst the temporary replacements on guitar in late-summer 1964. |
| | Garry Thurmond (1944–2002) | 1964 | guitar; lead vocals | McCormick and Thurmond were amongst the temporary replacements on guitar in late-summer 1964. |
| | Roger Bush | 1964 | bass | Bush appeared as a one-off stand-in for Ken Marvin at a show on October 9, 1964. |
| | Benjamin "Tex" Logan (1927–2015) | 1964 | fiddle | Logan and Lilly appeared as one-off stand-ins at a show on October 31, 1964. |
| | Everett Alan Lilly | 1964 | bass | Logan and Lilly appeared as one-off stand-ins at a show on October 31, 1964. |
| | Marvin Hedrick (1925–1973) | 1964 | guitar; lead vocals | Hedrick filled in for Jimmy Elrod at a show on November 15, 1964. |
| | Julian "Winnie" Winston (1941–2005) | 1965 | banjo | Winston and McCoury appeared as one-off stand-ins at a show on April 2, 1965. |
| | Ronnie McCoury | 1965 | bass | Winston and McCoury appeared as one-off stand-ins at a show on April 2, 1965. |
| | J. D. Crowe (1937–2021) | 1965 | banjo | Crowe filled in for Lamar Grier at a show on September 11, 1965. |
| | Dick Miller | 1966 | bass | Miller filled in for James Monroe, who was ill, at a show on January 27, 1966. |
| | Mylos "Myles" Sonka | 1967 | guitar; lead vocals | Sonka and Land each filled in for a few shows after Peter Rowan's departure in March 1967. |
| | Mitchell Land | 1967 | guitar; lead vocals | Sonka and Land each filled in for a few shows after Peter Rowan's departure in March 1967. |
| | Paul Wiley | 1967 | banjo | Wiley, Williams and Williams appeared as stand-ins at shows on May 5 and 6, 1967. |
| | Vivian Williams | 1967 | fiddle | Wiley, Williams and Williams appeared as stand-ins at shows on May 5 and 6, 1967. |
| | Phil Williams | 1967 | bass | Wiley, Williams and Williams appeared as stand-ins at shows on May 5 and 6, 1967. |
| | Doug Dillard (1937–2012) | 1967 | banjo | Dillard, Jayne and Webb appeared as one-off stand-ins on May 12, 1967. |
| | Mitch Jayne (1928–2010) | 1967 | fiddle | Dillard, Jayne and Webb appeared as one-off stand-ins on May 12, 1967. |
| | Dean Webb (1937–2018) | 1967 | bass | Dillard, Jayne and Webb appeared as one-off stand-ins on May 12, 1967. |
| | Bob Warford | 1967 | banjo | Warford, Ellison and White filled in at a show on May 13, 1967. |
| | Dave Ellison | 1967 | fiddle | Warford, Ellison and White filled in at a show on May 13, 1967. |
| | Eric White | 1967 | bass | Warford, Ellison and White filled in at a show on May 13, 1967. |
| | Paul Ménard (1932–1993) | fiddle | Ménard filled in for Byron Berline at a TV recording on June 30, 1967. | |
| | Cliff Waldron (1941–2024) | 1970 | guitar; lead vocals | Waldron filled in for James Monroe during an unknown date in 1970. |
| | Richard Hefner | 1973 | banjo; backing vocals | Hefner filled in at a few shows in September 1973 after Jack Hicks' departure. |
| | Randy Chapman | 1973 | banjo; backing vocals | Chapman filled in at two shows on November 8 and 11, 1973 after Ben Pedigo's departure. |
| | Larry Bartosh | 1973 | banjo; backing vocals | Bartosh followed Chapman, filling the vacated banjo spot at one show on November 24, 1973. |
| | Wayne Shrubsall | 1974 | banjo; backing vocals | Shrubsall filled in for Bob Black at one show on November 1, 1974. |
| | John Hedgecoth | 1975 | banjo | Hedgecoth filled in for Bob Black at one show during February 1975. |
| | Tom Mullen | 1976 | mandolin | Mullen filled in on mandolin at one show on August 28, 1976. |
| | Alan O'Bryant | 1977 | banjo; baritone vocals | O'Bryant filled in during late-March 1977 after Bill Holden's departure. |
| | Jim Brock (1934–2019) | 1977; 1978; 1979 | fiddle (1977); banjo (1978, 1979) | Brock filled in for Kenny Baker in July 1977, then again during 1978 and 1979. |
| | James Bryan | 1977 | fiddle | Bryan filled in for Kenny Baker, who had injured his band, between August and October 1977. |
| | Raymond Huffmaster | 1979 | bass | Huffmaster filled in during mid–late-June 1979 after Randy Davis' departure. |
| | Paul Kovac | 1981 | banjo | Kovac filled in at a show on July 5, 1981, after Butch Robins' departure. |
| | Tim Smith | 1981 | fiddle | Smith filled in for Kenny Baker at a show on October 18, 1981. |
| | Gordon Reid | 1981 | banjo | Reid also filled in on banjo during unknown dates in 1981. |
| | Ray Legere | 1982 | mandolin | Legere filled in for Monroe, who was ill, at a show during July 1982. |
| | Johnnie Baker | 1984 | bass | Baker filled in during mid–late-June 1984 after Mark Hembree's departure. |
| | Paul Squyres | 1984 | bass | After Kenny Baker's departure, Tater Tate switched to fiddle and Squyres filled in on bass for one show. |
| | Paul Sato | 1984 | bass | Sato filled in on bass at the band's last show before a Japanese tour on October 18, 1984. |
| | Tatsuya Imai | 1984 | bass | Imai filled in on bass for the first five shows of a Japanese tour from October 21–24, 1984. |
| | Sab Watanabe (1949–2019) | 1984 | bass | Watanabe filled in at the final show on the Japanese tour on October 27, 1984. |
| | Randall Franks | 1984 | bass; occasional fiddle | After the Japanese tour, Franks filled in for six shows between October 31 and November 7, 1984. |
| | Roger Aycock | 1984 | bass | Aycock also filled in on bass around late-October/early-November 1984. |
| | Kenny Jones | 1986 | bass | Jones, Huskey and Rose each filled in during September 1986 after Johnny Montgomery's departure. |
| | Roy Huskey Jr. (1956–1997) | 1986 | bass | Jones, Huskey and Rose each filled in during September 1986 after Johnny Montgomery's departure. |
| | Forrest Rose (1956–2005) | 1986 | bass | Jones, Huskey and Rose each filled in during September 1986 after Johnny Montgomery's departure. |
| | Mark Kuykendall (1962–2023) | 1993–1995 | bass; backing vocals | Kuykendall filled in for Tater Tate on numerous occasions from December 1993 to November 1995. |
| | Raymond McLain | 1994 | bass | McLain filled in for Tate at a show on June 23, 1994. |
| | Rick Campbell | 1994 | fiddle | Campbell filled in for Robert Bowlin during July 1994. |
| | Ronnie McCoury | 1994 | guitar | McCoury filled in for Tom Ewing at a show on November 4, 1994. |
| | Bryan Sutton | 1995 | mandolin | Sutton filled in for Monroe when he was too ill to perform at one show during spring 1995. |
| | Mike Bub | 1995 | banjo; bass | Bub filled in for Dana Cupp on June 27, 1995, and Tater Tate on November 10, 1995. |

=== Session ===
| Image | Name (lifetime) | Years active | Instruments | Release contributions |
|---|---|---|---|---|
| | Ernie Newton (1908–1976) | 1951; 1952–1954 | bass | "Prisoner's Song" (1951); "Rotation Blues" (1951); "Highway of Sorrow" (1951) — A-side only; all BGB releases from "When the Cactus Is in Bloom" (1952) to "You'll Find Her Name Written There" (1955); "Devil's Dream" (1963) — B-side "New John Henry Blues" only |
| | Grady Martin (1929–2001) | 1951; 1954 | guitar; fiddle | "Prisoner's Song" (1951); "Highway of Sorrow" (1951) — A-side only; "When the Cactus Is in Bloom" (1952) — B-side "Sailor's Plea" only; "Changing Partners" (1954); "Happy on My Way" (1954); "I'm Working on a Building" (1954); "You'll Find Her Name Written There" (1954) — B-side "Sittin' Alone in the Moonlight" only |
| | Ferris Coursey (1911–1968) | 1951 | drums | "Prisoner's Song" (1951); "Highway of Sorrow" (1951) — A-side only; "When the Cactus Is in Bloom" (1952) — B-side "Sailor's Plea" only |
| | Owen Bradley (1915–1998) | 1951; 1952; 1958 | piano; organ; vibraphone | "Prisoner's Song" (1951); "Christmas Time's A-Comin'" (1951) — A-side only; "A Mighty Pretty Waltz" (1952) — A-side only; I Saw the Light (1958) |
| | Tommy Jackson (1926–1979) | 1951; 1957 | fiddle | "Prisoner's Song" (1951); "Four Walls" (1957); Knee Deep in Blue Grass (1958) |
| | Jimmie Selph (1915–2000) | 1951 | guitar | "Prisoner's Song" (1951) |
| | Loren "Jack" Shook (1910–1986) | 1951 | guitar | "Highway of Sorrow" (1951) — A-side only; "When the Cactus Is in Bloom" (1952) — B-side "Sailor's Plea" only |
| | Milton Estes (1914–1963) | 1954 | bass vocals | "Happy on My Way" (1954); "I'm Working on a Building" (1954) |
| | Hubert Davis (1929–1992) | 1954 | banjo | "Cheyenne" (1955); "Wheel Hoss" — A-side only; "You'll Find Her Name Written There" (1957) — A-side only |
| | Doug Kershaw | 1957 | guitar | Knee Deep in Blue Grass (1958) |
| | Culley Holt (1925–1980) | 1958; 1962; 1970 | bass vocals | I Saw the Light (1958); I'll Meet You in Church Sunday Morning (1964); Road of Life (1974) |
| | Carl Butler (1927–1992) | 1960 | guitar | Mr. Blue Grass (1961) |
| | Bobby Joe Lester | 1961 | fiddle | Bluegrass Ramble (1962) |
| | Ray Edenton (1926–2022) | 1962 | baritone vocals | I'll Meet You in Church Sunday Morning (1964); Road of Life (1974) |
| | Joe Zinkan (1918–2003) | 1969; 1970 | bass | "Fireball Mail" (1969); "Walk Softly on My Heart" (1969) — B-side "McKinley's March" only; Kentucky Blue Grass (1970); Uncle Pen (1972) |
| | Joe "Red" Hayes (1926–1973) | 1969; 1970 | fiddle | "Fireball Mail" (1969); "Walk Softly on My Heart" (1969) — A-side only; Bill Monroe's Country Music Hall of Fame (1971); "Goin' Up Caney" (1971) — B-side "Tallahassee" only; "My Old Kentucky and You" (1972) — B-side "Lonesome Moonlight Waltz" only; Uncle Pen (1972) |
| | Bobby Thompson (1937–2005) | 1970 | banjo | Bill Monroe's Country Music Hall of Fame (1971); "Goin' Up Caney" (1971) — B-side "Tallahassee" only; "My Old Kentucky and You" (1972) — B-side "Lonesome Moonlight Waltz" only |
| | Blaine Sprouse | 1976 (Note: Sprouse also appeared as a touring stand-in during late-September 1988.) | fiddle | Bill Monroe Sings Bluegrass, Body and Soul (1977) |
| | Norman Blake | 1981 | guitar | Master of Bluegrass (1981) |
| | Jesse McReynolds (1929–2023) | 1981 | mandolin | Master of Bluegrass (1981) |
| | Larry Sledge | 1981 | mandolin | Master of Bluegrass (1981) |
| | Emory Gordy Jr. | 1988 | bass vocals | Southern Flavor (1988) |

== Lineups ==
| Period | Members | Releases |
|---|---|---|
| July–November 1938 (Note: Monroe's July–November 1938 band was known as The Kentucky Blue Grass Boys from July to August, and as Bill Monroe and the Kentuckians from September to November.) | Bill Monroe — mandolin, tenor vocals; Bill Wesbrooks — guitar, bass, lead vocals; Chuck Haire — bass, guitar, lead vocals; Bob Jamieson — fiddle | none |
| November 1938–May 1939 | Bill Monroe — mandolin, guitar, lead/tenor vocals; Cleo Davis — guitar, mandolin, lead/bass vocals | none |
| May–July 1939 | Bill Monroe — mandolin, guitar, lead/tenor vocals; Cleo Davis — guitar, mandolin, lead/bass vocals; Art Wooten — fiddle, baritone vocals; Tommy Millard — jug, bones, spoons | none |
| July 1939–July 1940 | Bill Monroe — mandolin, guitar, lead/tenor vocals; Cleo Davis — guitar, mandolin, lead/bass vocals; Art Wooten — fiddle, baritone vocals; Amos Garren — bass, tenor vocals | The Music of Bill Monroe from 1936 to 1994 (1994) — one track, "Mule Skinner Blues" |
| July–August 1940 | Bill Monroe — mandolin, guitar, lead/tenor vocals; Cleo Davis — guitar, mandolin, lead/bass vocals; Tommy Magness — fiddle, baritone vocals; Amos Garren — bass, tenor vocals | none |
| August–September 1940 | Bill Monroe — mandolin, guitar, lead/tenor vocals; Cleo Davis — guitar, mandolin, lead/bass vocals; Tommy Magness — fiddle, baritone vocals; Bill Wesbrooks — bass, tenor vocals | none |
| September–October 1940 | Bill Monroe — mandolin, lead/tenor vocals; Clyde Moody — guitar, lead/bass vocals; Tommy Magness — fiddle, baritone vocals; Mac McGar — fiddle; Bill Wesbrooks — bass, tenor vocals | none |
| October 1940–September 1941 | Bill Monroe — mandolin, lead/tenor vocals; Clyde Moody — guitar, lead/bass vocals; Tommy Magness — fiddle, baritone vocals; Bill Wesbrooks — bass, tenor vocals | "Mule Skinner Blues" (1940); "Cryin' Holy unto the Lord" (1940); "Dog House Blues" (1941); "Tennessee Blues" (1941) |
| September–November 1941 | Bill Monroe — mandolin, lead/tenor vocals; Pete Pyle — guitar, lead/bass vocals; Art Wooten — fiddle, baritone vocals; Bill Wesbrooks — bass, tenor vocals | "Blue Yodel No. 7 (Fox Trot)" (1941); "The Coupon Song" (1941); "Shake My Mother's Hand for Me" (1942); "Back Up and Push" (1942) |
| November–December 1941 | Bill Monroe — mandolin, lead/tenor vocals; Pete Pyle — guitar, lead/bass vocals; Curly Bradshaw — guitar, harmonica; Art Wooten — fiddle, baritone vocals; Bill Wesbrooks — bass, tenor vocals | none |
| December 1941–February 1942 | Bill Monroe — mandolin, lead/tenor vocals; Pete Pyle — guitar, lead/bass vocals; Art Wooten — fiddle, baritone vocals; Bill Wesbrooks — bass, tenor vocals | none |
| February–June 1942 | Bill Monroe — mandolin, lead/tenor vocals; Clyde Moody — guitar, lead/bass vocals; Jay Hugh Hall — guitar, backing vocals; Art Wooten — fiddle, baritone vocals; Bill Wesbrooks — bass, tenor vocals | none |
| June–July 1942 | Bill Monroe — mandolin, lead/tenor vocals; Clyde Moody — guitar, lead/bass vocals; Jay Hugh Hall — guitar, backing vocals; Howdy Forrester — fiddle; Bill Wesbrooks — bass, tenor vocals | none |
| July–October 1942 | Bill Monroe — mandolin, lead/tenor vocals; Clyde Moody — guitar, lead/bass vocals; Jay Hugh Hall — guitar, backing vocals; David Akeman — banjo, baritone vocals; Howdy Forrester — fiddle; Bill Wesbrooks — bass, tenor vocals | none |
| October 1942–March 1943 | Bill Monroe — mandolin, lead/tenor vocals; Clyde Moody — guitar, lead/bass vocals; David Akeman — banjo, baritone vocals; Howdy Forrester — fiddle; Carl Story — fiddle, baritone vocals; Bill Wesbrooks — bass, tenor vocals | none |
| March–October 1943 | Bill Monroe — mandolin, lead/tenor vocals; Clyde Moody — guitar, lead/bass vocals; David Akeman — banjo, baritone vocals; Carl Story — fiddle, baritone vocals; Chubby Wise — fiddle; Bill Wesbrooks — bass, tenor vocals | none |
| October–November 1943 | Bill Monroe — mandolin, lead/tenor vocals; Clyde Moody — guitar, lead/bass vocals; David Akeman — banjo, baritone vocals; Chubby Wise — fiddle; Bill Wesbrooks — bass, tenor vocals | none |
| November–December 1943 | Bill Monroe — mandolin, lead/tenor vocals; Clyde Moody — guitar, lead/bass vocals; Curly Bradshaw — guitar, harmonica; David Akeman — banjo, baritone vocals; Chubby Wise — fiddle; Bill Wesbrooks — bass, tenor vocals; Sally Ann Forrester — accordion, tenor vocals | none |
| December 1943–November 1944 | Bill Monroe — mandolin, lead/tenor vocals; Clyde Moody — guitar, lead/bass vocals; Curly Bradshaw — guitar, harmonica; David Akeman — banjo, baritone vocals; Chubby Wise — fiddle; Howard Watts — bass, bass vocals; Sally Ann Forrester — accordion, tenor vocals | none |
| November 1944–April 1945 | Bill Monroe — mandolin, lead/tenor vocals; Tex Willis — guitar, lead/tenor vocals; Curly Bradshaw — guitar, harmonica; David Akeman — banjo, baritone vocals; Chubby Wise — fiddle; Howard Watts — bass, bass vocals; Sally Ann Forrester — accordion, tenor vocals; Lester Flatt — guitar, vocals (stand-in, March–April 1945); Jim Shumate — fiddle, vocals (stand-in, March–April 1945); Andy Boyette — bass, guitar (stand-in, March–April 1945) | "Rocky Road Blues" (1946); "True Life Blues" (1946); "Blue Moon of Kentucky" (1947)^{B}; "Blue Grass Special" (1947)^{A} |
| April–September 1945 | Bill Monroe — mandolin, lead/tenor vocals; Lester Flatt — guitar, lead/tenor vocals; David Akeman — banjo, baritone vocals; Jim Shumate — fiddle, bass vocals; Howard Watts — bass, bass vocals; Sally Ann Forrester — accordion, tenor vocals; Birch Monroe — bass, bass vocals (stand-in, from July) | none |
| September–October 1945 | Bill Monroe — mandolin, lead/tenor vocals; Lester Flatt — guitar, lead/tenor vocals; Jim Andrews — tenor banjo; Jim Shumate — fiddle, bass vocals; Howard Watts — bass, bass vocals; Sally Ann Forrester — accordion, tenor vocals; Birch Monroe — bass, bass vocals (stand-in) | none |
| October–November 1945 | Bill Monroe — mandolin, lead/tenor vocals; Lester Flatt — guitar, lead/tenor vocals; David Akeman — banjo, baritone vocals; Jim Shumate — fiddle, bass vocals; Howard Watts — bass, bass vocals; Sally Ann Forrester — accordion, tenor vocals; Birch Monroe — bass, bass vocals (stand-in) | none |
| November–December 1945 | Bill Monroe — mandolin, lead/tenor vocals; Lester Flatt — guitar, lead/tenor vocals; Jim Shumate — fiddle, bass vocals; Howdy Forrester – fiddle; Howard Watts — bass, bass vocals; Sally Ann Forrester — accordion, tenor vocals; Birch Monroe — fiddle, bass vocals (part-time); Joe Forrester — bass (stand-in) | none |
| December 1945–March 1946 | Bill Monroe — mandolin, lead/tenor vocals; Lester Flatt — guitar, lead/tenor vocals; Earl Scruggs — banjo, baritone vocals; Howdy Forrester — fiddle; Howard Watts — bass, bass vocals; Sally Ann Forrester — accordion, tenor vocals; Birch Monroe — fiddle, bass vocals (part-time); Joe Forrester — bass (stand-in) | none |
| March–April 1946 | Bill Monroe — mandolin, lead/tenor vocals; Lester Flatt — guitar, lead/tenor vocals; Earl Scruggs — banjo, baritone vocals; Howard Watts — bass, bass vocals; Birch Monroe — fiddle, bass vocals (part-time) | none |
| April 1946–January 1948 | Bill Monroe — mandolin, lead/tenor vocals; Lester Flatt — guitar, lead/tenor vocals; Earl Scruggs — banjo, baritone vocals; Chubby Wise — fiddle; Howard Watts — bass, bass vocals; Birch Monroe — fiddle (part-time, until November 1946); Birch Monroe — bass (stand-in, Nov. 1946–Sep. 1947); Chick Stripling — bass (stand-in, spring–summer 1947) | "Mansions for Me" (1947); "Blue Yodel No. 4" (1947); "Blue Moon of Kentucky" (1947)^{A}; "Blue Grass Special" (1947)^{B}; "My Rose of Old Kentucky" (1948); "I Hear a Sweet Voice Calling" (1948); "Summertime Is Past and Gone" (1948); "When You Are Lonely" (1948); "Blue Grass Breakdown" (1949); "Heavy Traffic Ahead" (1949); "I'm Going Back to Old Kentucky" (1949) |
| January–February 1948 | Bill Monroe — mandolin, lead/tenor vocals; Lester Flatt — guitar, lead/tenor vocals; Earl Scruggs — banjo, baritone vocals; Benny Martin — fiddle, bass vocals; Howard Watts — bass, bass vocals | none |
| Late-February–mid-March 1948 | Bill Monroe — mandolin, lead/tenor vocals; Lester Flatt — guitar, lead/tenor vocals; Benny Martin — fiddle, bass vocals; Joel Price — bass, baritone vocals (stand-in); Tommy Goad — banjo (stand-in, late-February); Lloyd McCraw — banjo (stand-in, late-February); Jackie Phelps — steel guitar (stand-in, March) | none |
| March–April 1948 | Bill Monroe — mandolin, lead/tenor vocals; Jackie Phelps — steel guitar, lead/tenor vocals; Don Reno — banjo, guitar, baritone vocals; Benny Martin — fiddle, bass vocals; Joel Price — bass, baritone vocals | none |
| April–May 1948 | Bill Monroe — mandolin, lead/tenor vocals; Jim Eanes — guitar, lead/tenor vocals; Jackie Phelps — steel guitar, baritone vocals; Don Reno — banjo, guitar, baritone vocals; Benny Martin — fiddle, bass vocals; Joel Price — bass, baritone vocals | none |
| May–June 1948 | Bill Monroe — mandolin, lead/tenor vocals; Doyle Wright — guitar, lead/tenor vocals; Jackie Phelps — steel guitar, baritone vocals; Don Reno — banjo, guitar, baritone vocals; Benny Martin — fiddle, bass vocals; Joel Price — bass, baritone vocals | none |
| June 1948–March 1949 | Bill Monroe — mandolin, lead/tenor vocals; Don Reno — banjo, guitar, lead/tenor vocals; Jackie Phelps — guitar, baritone vocals; Benny Martin — fiddle, bass vocals; Joel Price — bass, baritone vocals | none |
| March–April 1949 | Bill Monroe — mandolin, lead/tenor vocals; Don Reno — banjo, guitar, lead/tenor vocals; Benny Martin — fiddle, bass vocals; Joel Price — bass, baritone vocals; Stan Hankinson — guitar, vocals (stand-in) | none |
| April–early June 1949 | Bill Monroe — mandolin, lead/tenor vocals; Don Reno — banjo, guitar, lead/tenor vocals; Mac Wiseman — guitar, tenor vocals; Benny Martin — fiddle, bass vocals; Mack Carger — bass, backing vocals | none |
| Early–late-June 1949 | Bill Monroe — mandolin, lead/tenor vocals; Don Reno — banjo, guitar, lead/tenor vocals; Mac Wiseman — guitar, tenor vocals; Mack Carger — bass, backing vocals; Floyd Ethridge — fiddle (stand-in) | none |
| Late-June–mid-July 1949 | Bill Monroe — mandolin, lead/tenor vocals; Don Reno — banjo, guitar, lead/tenor vocals; Mac Wiseman — guitar, tenor vocals; Gene Christian — fiddle; Mack Carger — bass, backing vocals | none |
| Mid-July–mid-August 1949 | Bill Monroe — mandolin, lead/tenor vocals; Mac Wiseman — guitar, lead/tenor vocals; Gene Christian — fiddle; Mack Carger — bass, backing vocals | none |
| August–December 1949 | Bill Monroe — mandolin, lead/tenor vocals; Mac Wiseman — guitar, lead/tenor vocals; Rudy Lyle — banjo, baritone vocals; Chubby Wise — fiddle; Jack Thompson — bass | "The Girl in the Blue Velvet Band" (1949); "Can't You Hear Me Callin'" (1950) |
| December 1949–January 1950 | Bill Monroe — mandolin, lead/tenor vocals; Jimmy Martin — guitar, lead/tenor vocals; Rudy Lyle — banjo, baritone vocals; Chubby Wise — fiddle; Joel Price — bass, baritone vocals | none |
| January–summer 1950 | Bill Monroe — mandolin, lead/tenor vocals; Jimmy Martin — guitar, lead/tenor vocals; Rudy Lyle — banjo, baritone vocals; Vassar Clements — fiddle, backing vocals; Joel Price — bass, baritone vocals | "New Mule Skinner Blues" (1950); "The Old Fiddler" (1950); "Boat of Love" (1950); "Memories of You" (1950); "I'll Meet You in Church Sunday Morning" (1951)^{A} |
| Summer–mid-December 1950 | Bill Monroe — mandolin, lead/tenor vocals; Jimmy Martin — guitar, lead/tenor vocals; Rudy Lyle — banjo, baritone vocals; Red Taylor — fiddle, baritone vocals; Joel Price — bass, baritone vocals | "When the Golden Leaves Fall" (1950) |
| Late-December 1950–March 1951 | Bill Monroe — mandolin, lead/tenor vocals; Jimmy Martin — guitar, lead/tenor vocals; Rudy Lyle — banjo, baritone vocals; Gordon Terry — fiddle, bass vocals (Note: Despite replacing Merle "Red" Taylor the previous month, Terry did not perform on "Poison Love" or "Letter from My Darlin'", with Taylor playing fiddle in his place.); Joel Price — bass, baritone vocals; Vern Young — guitar, vocals (stand-in, late-January 1951) | "Poison Love" (1951); "Prisoner's Song" (1951) (Note: "Prisoner's Song" was recorded by Monroe with session musicians Grady Martin, Jimmie Selph (both guitar), Tommy Jackson (fiddle), Ernie Newton (bass), Owen Bradley (piano and organ) and Ferris Coursey (drums).); "Letter from My Darlin'" (1952) |
| March–May 1951 | Bill Monroe — mandolin, lead/tenor vocals; Jimmy Martin — guitar, lead/tenor vocals; Rudy Lyle — banjo, baritone vocals; Hal Smith — fiddle; Joel Price — bass, baritone vocals | "Highway of Sorrow" (1951)^{A} (Note: "Highway of Sorrow" and "Sailor's Plea" (the B-side to "When the Cactus Is in Bloom") were recorded by Monroe, Lyle and Smith with session musicians Grady Martin, Jack Shook (both guitar), Ernie Newton (bass) and Ferris Coursey (drums).); "Travelin' Blues" (1951); "When the Cactus Is in Bloom" (1952) |
| May 1951 | Bill Monroe — mandolin, lead/tenor vocals; Pete Pyle — guitar, lead/bass vocals; Rudy Lyle — banjo, baritone vocals; Gordon Terry — fiddle, bass vocals; Joel Price — bass, baritone vocals | none |
| June 1951 | Bill Monroe — mandolin, lead/tenor vocals; Vic Daniels — guitar, lead/tenor vocals; Rudy Lyle — banjo, baritone vocals; Gordon Terry — fiddle, bass vocals; Joel Price — bass, baritone vocals | none |
| June–August 1951 | Bill Monroe — mandolin, lead/tenor vocals; Carter Stanley — guitar, lead/tenor vocals; Rudy Lyle — banjo, baritone vocals; Gordon Terry — fiddle, bass vocals; Bessie Lee Mauldin — bass (Note: Mauldin did not record with the BGB for several years after joining in 1951, due to the fact that she had only just started learning the instrument at the time. Ernie Newton filled in on bass at the majority of recording sessions, except where noted.) | "Rotation Blues" (1951); "I'll Meet You in Church Sunday Morning" (1951)^{B}; "Highway of Sorrow" (1951)^{B}; "Country Waltz" (1953)^{B} |
| Early-August–early-September 1951 | Bill Monroe — mandolin, lead/tenor vocals; Carter Stanley — guitar, lead/tenor vocals; Gordon Terry — fiddle, bass vocals; Bessie Lee Mauldin — bass; Old Joe Clark — banjo (stand-in, early-August); Ralph Stanley — banjo (stand-in, mid–late August); Pee Wee Lambert — mandolin (stand-in, late-August) (Note: Lambert filled in on mandolin while Monroe switched to guitar to cover for Carter Stanley, who was ill.); Johnny Vipperman — banjo (stand-in, early-September) | none |
| Mid-September 1951 | Bill Monroe — mandolin, lead/tenor vocals; Carter Stanley — guitar, lead/tenor vocals; Joe Drumright — banjo, baritone vocals; Gordon Terry — fiddle, bass vocals; Bessie Lee Mauldin — bass | none |
| Mid–late-September 1951 | Bill Monroe — mandolin, lead/tenor vocals; South Salyer — guitar, lead/tenor vocals; Joe Drumright — banjo, baritone vocals; Gordon Terry — fiddle, bass vocals; Bessie Lee Mauldin — bass; Shorty Shehan — bass | none |
| Late-September–November 1951 | Bill Monroe — mandolin, lead/tenor vocals; Edd Mayfield — guitar, lead/tenor vocals; Joe Drumright — banjo, baritone vocals (Note: Drumright did not perform on "Christmas Time's A-Comin'" or "First Whippoorwill", with banjo covered by James "Gar" Bowers (he would later join the band officially).); Gordon Terry — fiddle, bass vocals; Bessie Lee Mauldin — bass; Shorty Shehan — bass | "Christmas Time's A-Comin'" (1951); "First Whippoorwill" (1952)^{A} |
| November–December 1951 | Bill Monroe — mandolin, lead/tenor vocals; Edd Mayfield — guitar, lead/tenor vocals; Gar Bowers — banjo; Gordon Terry — fiddle, bass vocals; Bessie Lee Mauldin — bass; Shorty Shehan — bass | none |
| December 1951–January 1952 | Bill Monroe — mandolin, lead/tenor vocals; Edd Mayfield — guitar, lead/tenor vocals; Gar Bowers — banjo; Gordon Terry — fiddle, bass vocals; Bessie Lee Mauldin — bass; Old Joe Clark — bass (stand-in) | none |
| February–June 1952 | Bill Monroe — mandolin, lead/tenor vocals; Edd Mayfield — guitar, lead/tenor vocals; Larry Richardson — banjo, tenor vocals; Charlie Cline — fiddle, baritone vocals; Bessie Lee Mauldin — bass; Old Joe Clark — bass (stand-in) | none |
| June–July 1952 | Bill Monroe — mandolin, lead/tenor vocals; Billy Price — guitar, lead/tenor vocals; Charlie Cline — fiddle, banjo, baritone vocals; Bessie Lee Mauldin — bass; Old Joe Clark — bass (stand-in) | none |
| July–September 1952 | Bill Monroe — mandolin, lead/tenor vocals; Jimmy Martin — guitar, lead/tenor vocals; Sonny Osborne — banjo, baritone vocals; Charlie Cline — fiddle, baritone vocals; Bessie Lee Mauldin — bass | "A Mighty Pretty Waltz" (1952) (Note: "A Mighty Pretty Waltz" also features Owen Bradley on piano.); "Footprints in the Snow" (1952); "Country Waltz" (1953)^{A}; "The Little Girl and the Dreadful Snake" (1953) |
| September 1952–January 1953 | Bill Monroe — mandolin, lead/tenor vocals; Jimmy Martin — guitar, lead/tenor vocals; Jim Smoak — banjo, backing vocals; Charlie Cline — fiddle, baritone vocals; Bessie Lee Mauldin — bass | none |
| Mid-January 1953 | Bill Monroe — mandolin, lead/tenor vocals; Jimmy Martin — guitar, lead/tenor vocals; Jim Smoak — banjo, backing vocals; Bessie Lee Mauldin — bass; Gordon Terry — fiddle, bass vocals (stand-in) | none |
Band on hiatus January–April 1953
| April–May 1953 | Bill Monroe — mandolin, lead/tenor vocals; Jimmy Martin — guitar, lead/tenor vocals; L. E. White — fiddle, backing vocals; Charlie Cline — banjo, baritone vocals (stand-in); Guy Stevenson — bass (stand-in) | none |
| May–August 1953 | Bill Monroe — mandolin, lead/tenor vocals; Jimmy Martin — guitar, lead/tenor vocals; Sonny Osborne — banjo, baritone vocals; L. E. White — fiddle, backing vocals; Leslie Sandy — bass | none |
| August–November 1953 | Bill Monroe — mandolin, lead/tenor vocals; Jimmy Martin — guitar, lead/tenor vocals; Rudy Lyle — banjo, baritone vocals; L. E. White — fiddle, backing vocals; Leslie Sandy — bass | none |
| November–December 1953 | Bill Monroe — mandolin, lead/tenor vocals; Jimmy Martin — guitar, lead/tenor vocals; Rudy Lyle — banjo, baritone vocals; Charlie Cline — fiddle, baritone vocals; Leslie Sandy — bass (Note: Sandy did not perform on "Wishing Waltz" or "Get Up John" (the B-side to "White House Blues"), with bass covered by Ernie Newton.) | "Wishing Waltz" (1954); "White House Blues" (1954)^{B} |
| December 1953–January 1954 | Bill Monroe — mandolin, lead/tenor vocals; Jimmy Martin — guitar, lead/tenor vocals; Rudy Lyle — banjo, baritone vocals; Charlie Cline — fiddle, baritone vocals; Bessie Lee Mauldin — bass | "Changing Partners" (1954) (Note: "Changing Partners" and "Sittin' Alone in the Moonlight" (the B-side to "You'll Find Her Name Written There") also feature Grady Martin on guitar.); "White House Blues" (1954)^{A}; "Happy on My Way" (1954) (Note: "Happy on My Way" and "I'm Working on a Building" also feature Milton Estes on bass vocals.); "I'm Working on a Building" (1954); "On and On" (1956); "You'll Find Her Name Written There" (1957)^{B}; "Devil's Dream" (1963)^{B} |
| January 1954 | Bill Monroe — mandolin, lead/tenor vocals; Jimmy Martin — guitar, lead/tenor vocals; Bobby Atkins — banjo, baritone vocals; Charlie Cline — fiddle, baritone vocals; Carlton Haney — bass (stand-in) | none |
| Late-January–March 1954 | Bill Monroe — mandolin, lead/tenor vocals; Jimmy Martin — guitar, lead/tenor vocals; Jim Smoak — banjo, backing vocals; Gordon Terry — fiddle (stand-in, unknown dates); Red Taylor — fiddle (stand-in, unknown dates); Dale Potter — fiddle (stand-in, unknown dates); Robert van Winkle — bass (stand-in, unknown dates) | none |
| March–April 1954 | Bill Monroe — mandolin, lead/tenor vocals; Edd Mayfield — guitar, lead/tenor vocals; Jim Smoak — banjo, backing vocals; Gordon Terry — fiddle (stand-in, unknown dates); Red Taylor — fiddle (stand-in, unknown dates); Dale Potter — fiddle (stand-in, unknown dates); Robert van Winkle — bass (stand-in, unknown dates) | none |
| April–May 1954 | Bill Monroe — mandolin, lead/tenor vocals; Edd Mayfield — guitar, lead/tenor vocals; Jim Smoak — banjo, backing vocals; Jack Youngblood — fiddle; Lazy Jim Day — bass (stand-in) | none |
| May–August 1954 | Bill Monroe — mandolin, lead/tenor vocals; Edd Mayfield — guitar, lead/tenor vocals; Jim Smoak — banjo, backing vocals; Gordon Terry — fiddle (stand-in and session); Red Taylor — fiddle (stand-in and session); Charlie Cline — fiddle (stand-in and session); Lazy Jim Day — bass (touring stand-in); Ernie Newton — bass (session stand-in) | "Blue Moon of Kentucky" (1954)^{B}; "Wheel Hoss" (1955)^{B} |
| August–September 1954 | Bill Monroe — mandolin, lead/tenor vocals; Edd Mayfield — guitar, lead/tenor vocals; Gordon Terry — fiddle (stand-in and session); Red Taylor — fiddle (stand-in and session); Charlie Cline — fiddle (stand-in and session); Lazy Jim Day — bass (touring stand-in); Ernie Newton — bass (session stand-in) | "Blue Moon of Kentucky" (1954)^{A} |
| September–October 1954 | Bill Monroe — mandolin, lead/tenor vocals; Edd Mayfield — guitar, lead/tenor vocals; Charlie Cline — banjo, fiddle, baritone vocals; Leslie Sandy — bass; Gordon Terry — fiddle, bass vocals (stand-in) | none |
| October–November 1954 | Bill Monroe — mandolin, lead/tenor vocals; Edd Mayfield — guitar, lead/tenor vocals; Charlie Cline — banjo, fiddle, baritone vocals; Gordon Terry — fiddle, bass vocals (stand-in); Bobby Hicks — bass, bass vocals (stand-in) | none |
| November 1954–February 1955 | Bill Monroe — mandolin, lead/tenor vocals; Jackie Phelps — guitar, lead/tenor vocals; Charlie Cline — banjo, fiddle, baritone vocals; Bobby Hicks — fiddle, bass vocals; Gordon Terry — fiddle, bass vocals (stand-in); Red Taylor — fiddle (stand-in); Ernie Newton — bass (stand-in) | "Cheyenne" (1955); "Wheel Hoss" (1955)^{A}; "You'll Find Her Name Written There" (1957)^{A} |
| February–March 1955 | Bill Monroe — mandolin, lead/tenor vocals; Carlos Brock — guitar, lead/tenor vocals; Jackie Phelps — banjo, tenor vocals; Charlie Cline — fiddle, baritone vocals; Bobby Hicks — fiddle, bass vocals; Bessie Lee Mauldin — bass | none |
| March–May 1955 | Bill Monroe — mandolin, lead/tenor vocals; Carlos Brock — guitar, lead/tenor vocals; Noah Crase — banjo, baritone vocals; Charlie Cline — fiddle, baritone vocals; Bobby Hicks — fiddle, bass vocals; Bessie Lee Mauldin — bass | none |
| May–July 1955 | Bill Monroe — mandolin, lead/tenor vocals; Carlos Brock — guitar, lead/tenor vocals; Charlie Cline — banjo, baritone vocals; Bobby Hicks — fiddle, bass vocals; Bessie Lee Mauldin — bass | none |
| July–August 1955 | Bill Monroe — mandolin, lead/tenor vocals; Charlie Cline — guitar, lead/baritone vocals; Bobby Hicks — fiddle, banjo, bass vocals; Bessie Lee Mauldin — bass | none |
| August–September 1955 | Bill Monroe — mandolin, lead/tenor vocals; Charlie Cline — guitar, lead/baritone vocals; Joe Stuart — banjo, baritone vocals; Bobby Hicks — fiddle, bass vocals; Bessie Lee Mauldin — bass | Bluegrass Instrumentals (1965)^{2} (Note: All three tracks recorded at the September 16, 1955 session also feature Gordon Terry and Vassar Clements on fiddles.) |
| September–December 1955 | Bill Monroe — mandolin, lead/tenor vocals; Charlie Cline — guitar, lead/baritone vocals; Joe Stuart — banjo, baritone vocals; Bobby Hicks — fiddle, bass vocals; Vassar Clements — fiddle, baritone vocals; Bessie Lee Mauldin — bass | none |
| December 1955–March 1956 | Bill Monroe — mandolin, lead/tenor vocals; Arnold Terry — guitar, lead/tenor vocals; Joe Stuart — banjo, baritone vocals; Bobby Hicks — fiddle, bass vocals; Vassar Clements — fiddle, baritone vocals; Bessie Lee Mauldin — bass | none |
| March–April 1956 | Bill Monroe — mandolin, lead/tenor vocals; Lucky Saylor — guitar, lead/tenor vocals; Joe Stuart — banjo, baritone vocals; Bobby Hicks — fiddle, bass vocals; Vassar Clements — fiddle, baritone vocals; Bessie Lee Mauldin — bass | none |
| April–June 1956 | Bill Monroe — mandolin, lead/tenor vocals; Yates Green — guitar, lead/tenor vocals; Joe Stuart — banjo, baritone vocals; Bobby Hicks — fiddle, bass vocals; Bessie Lee Mauldin — bass; Rudy Lyle — banjo (stand-in, mid-May) (Note: Stuart switched to fiddle briefly in mid-May, with Rudy Lyle filling in for him on banjo.) | none |
| Mid–late June 1956 | Bill Monroe — mandolin, lead/tenor vocals; Joe Stuart — guitar, lead/baritone vocals; Bobby Hicks — fiddle, bass vocals; Bessie Lee Mauldin — bass; Noah Crase — banjo, baritone vocals (stand-in) | none |
| Late-June–August 1956 | Bill Monroe — mandolin, lead/tenor vocals; Joe Stuart — guitar, banjo, lead/baritone vocals; Roger Smith — banjo, guitar, baritone vocals; Bobby Hicks — fiddle, bass vocals; Bessie Lee Mauldin — bass | none |
| August–September 1956 | Bill Monroe — mandolin, lead/tenor vocals; Jackie Phelps — guitar, lead/tenor vocals; Joe Stuart — banjo, baritone vocals; Bobby Hicks — fiddle, bass vocals; Bessie Lee Mauldin — bass | none |
| September 1956 | Bill Monroe — mandolin, lead/tenor vocals; Jackie Phelps — guitar, lead/tenor vocals; Joe Stuart — banjo, baritone vocals; Bessie Lee Mauldin — bass; Tommy Williams — fiddle (stand-in) | none |
| Late-September–early-October 1956 | Bill Monroe — mandolin, lead/tenor vocals; Joe Stuart — banjo, baritone vocals; Tater Tate — fiddle, bass vocals; Bessie Lee Mauldin — bass; Edd Mayfield — guitar, lead vocals (stand-in, September); Bob Metzel — guitar, lead vocals (stand-in, October) | none |
| Early–mid-October 1956 | Bill Monroe — mandolin, lead/tenor vocals; Enos Johnson — guitar, lead/tenor vocals; Joe Stuart — banjo, baritone vocals; Tater Tate — fiddle, bass vocals; Bessie Lee Mauldin — bass | none |
| Mid-October–early December 1956 | Bill Monroe — mandolin, lead/tenor vocals; Enos Johnson — guitar, lead/tenor vocals; Joe Stuart — banjo, baritone vocals; Joe Meadows — fiddle, bass vocals; Bessie Lee Mauldin — bass | none |
| Early December 1956–early January 1957 | Bill Monroe — mandolin, lead/tenor vocals; Carl Vanover — guitar, lead/tenor vocals; Joe Stuart — banjo, baritone vocals; Joe Meadows — fiddle, bass vocals; Bessie Lee Mauldin — bass | none |
| Early–late-January 1957 | Bill Monroe — mandolin, lead/tenor vocals; Joe Stuart — banjo, baritone vocals; Joe Meadows — fiddle, bass vocals; Bessie Lee Mauldin — bass; Bob Metzel — guitar, lead vocals (stand-in) | none |
| Late-January–June 1957 | Bill Monroe — mandolin, lead/tenor vocals; Joe Stuart — guitar, lead/baritone vocals; Don Stover — banjo, baritone vocals; Gordon Terry — fiddle, bass vocals; Bessie Lee Mauldin — bass | "Fallen Star" (1957) (Note: "Fallen Star" also features Tommy Jackson on fiddle.); Knee Deep in Blue Grass (1958)^{9} (Note: All nine tracks recorded at the May 14 and 15, 1957 sessions also feature Dale Potter on fiddle; the three from the former also feature Tommy Jackson on fiddle, while the six from the latter also feature Leslie Sandy on bass.) |
| July–September 1957 | Bill Monroe — mandolin, lead/tenor vocals; Ernie Graves — guitar, lead/tenor vocals; Joe Stuart — banjo, baritone vocals; Kenny Baker — fiddle, baritone vocals; Bessie Lee Mauldin — bass; Jack Paget — bass (occasional stand-in, summer) | none |
| September–October 1957 | Bill Monroe — mandolin, lead/tenor vocals; Chum Duncan — guitar, lead/tenor vocals; Joe Stuart — banjo, baritone vocals; Kenny Baker — fiddle, baritone vocals; Bessie Lee Mauldin — bass | none |
| October 1957–January 1958 | Bill Monroe — mandolin, lead/tenor vocals; Joe Stuart — banjo, baritone vocals; Kenny Baker — fiddle, baritone vocals; Bessie Lee Mauldin — bass | Knee Deep in Blue Grass (1958)^{3} (Note: All three tracks recorded at the December 15, 1957 session also feature Doug Kershaw on guitar and Jimmy Elrod on banjo.) |
| January–February 1958 | Bill Monroe — mandolin, lead/tenor vocals; Earl Snead — banjo; Kenny Baker — fiddle, baritone vocals; Bessie Lee Mauldin — bass; Charlie Smith — guitar, lead vocals (stand-in) | none |
| February–March 1958 | Bill Monroe — mandolin, lead/tenor vocals; Edd Mayfield — guitar, lead/tenor vocals; Earl Snead — banjo (Note: The album I Saw the Light does not feature any banjo, so Earl Snead did not perform at any of the recording sessions for the listed songs.); Kenny Baker — fiddle, baritone vocals; Bessie Lee Mauldin — bass | I Saw the Light (1958) (Note: Nine tracks on I Saw the Light feature Culley Holt on bass vocals, four of which also feature Owen Bradley on organ; the other three feature Gordon Terry on bass vocals.) |
| March–April 1958 | Bill Monroe — mandolin, lead/tenor vocals; Edd Mayfield — guitar, lead/tenor vocals; Kenny Baker — fiddle, baritone vocals; Bessie Lee Mauldin — bass | "Panhandle Country" (1958) (Note: "Panhandle Country" also features Joe Drumright on banjo and Bobby Hicks on fiddle.) |
| Late-April–Late-June 1958 | Bill Monroe — mandolin, lead/tenor vocals; Edd Mayfield — guitar, lead/tenor vocals; Eddie Adcock — banjo, baritone vocals; Red Taylor — fiddle, baritone vocals; Unknown musician — bass (stand-in) | none |
| Mid-June–mid-August 1958 | Bill Monroe — mandolin, lead/tenor vocals; Red Taylor — fiddle, baritone vocals; Red Cravens — guitar, vocals (stand-in, mid-June); Harley Bray — banjo (stand-in, mid-June); Francis Bray — bass (stand-in, mid-June); Melvin Goins — guitar, vocals (stand-in, late-June–July 7); Ray Goins — banjo, vocals (stand-in, late-June–July 7); Billy Edwards — bass (stand-in, late-June–July 7); Charlie Smith — guitar, vocals (stand-in, mid-July–mid-Aug.); Unknown musician — banjo (stand-in, mid-July–mid-Aug.); Unknown musician — bass (stand-in, mid-July–mid-Aug.) | none |
| Mid-August–late-November 1958 | Bill Monroe — mandolin, lead/tenor vocals; Roger Smith — fiddle, banjo, baritone vocals; Bessie Lee Mauldin — bass; Connie Gately — guitar, vocals (stand-in, unknown dates); Jackie Phelps — guitar, vocals (stand-in, unknown dates); Charlie Cline — guitar, vocals (stand-in, unknown dates); Bill Emerson — banjo (stand-in, unknown dates); Joe Drumright — banjo, vocals (stand-in, unknown dates); Charlie Smith — fiddle, vocals (stand-in, unknown dates); Bobby Hicks — fiddle, vocals (stand-in, from October) | none |
| November 1958–January 1959 | Bill Monroe — mandolin, lead/tenor vocals; Jack Cooke — guitar, lead/tenor vocals; Buddy Pennington — banjo, baritone vocals; Bobby Hicks — fiddle, bass vocals; Bessie Lee Mauldin — bass; Tommy Vaden — bass (stand-in, December 23–26, 1958) | "Gotta Travel On" (1958); Bluegrass Instrumentals (1965)^{2} |
| January–late-May 1959 | Bill Monroe — mandolin, lead/tenor vocals; Jack Cooke — guitar, lead/tenor vocals; Buddy Pennington — banjo, baritone vocals; Bobby Hicks — fiddle, bass vocals; Charlie Smith — fiddle, tenor vocals; Bessie Lee Mauldin — bass | "Dark as the Night, Blue as the Day" (1959); Bluegrass Instrumentals (1965)^{1} |
| Late-May–July 1959 | Bill Monroe — mandolin, lead/tenor vocals; Jack Cooke — guitar, lead/tenor vocals; Buddy Pennington — banjo, baritone vocals; Bobby Hicks — fiddle, bass vocals; Bessie Lee Mauldin — bass; Tom Gray — bass (occasional stand-in, summer) | none |
| July–August 1959 | Bill Monroe — mandolin, lead/tenor vocals; Jack Cooke — guitar, lead/tenor vocals; Buddy Pennington — banjo, baritone vocals; Bessie Lee Mauldin — bass; Kenny Baker — fiddle (stand-in, unknown dates); Dale Potter — fiddle (stand-in, unknown dates) | none |
| August–October 1959 | Bill Monroe — mandolin, lead/tenor vocals; Jack Cooke — guitar, lead/tenor vocals; Joe Stuart — banjo, baritone vocals; Dale Potter — fiddle; Bessie Lee Mauldin — bass | none |
| October–December 1959 | Bill Monroe — mandolin, lead/tenor vocals; Jack Cooke — guitar, lead/tenor vocals; Dale Potter — fiddle; Bessie Lee Mauldin — bass; Curtis McPeake — banjo (stand-in) | "Lonesome Wind Blues" (1960) (Note: "Lonesome Wind Blues" also features Joe Drumright on banjo and Benny Martin on fiddle.) |
| January–August 1960 | Bill Monroe — mandolin, lead/tenor vocals; Tony Ellis — banjo, baritone vocals; Dale Potter — fiddle; Bessie Lee Mauldin — bass; Jimmy Byrd — guitar, lead vocals (stand-in); Gordon Terry — fiddle, bass vocals (stand-in, January); Billy Baker — fiddle, vocals (rotating stand-in, summer); Joe Stuart — fiddle, vocals (rotating stand-in, summer) | none |
| Early-August 1960 | Bill Monroe — mandolin, lead/tenor vocals; Jimmy Byrd — guitar, lead vocals (stand-in); Porter Church — banjo, backing vocals (stand-in); Roger Drake — fiddle (stand-in); Tony Ellis — bass, baritone vocals (stand-in) | none |
| Mid-August 1960 | Bill Monroe — mandolin, lead/tenor vocals; Porter Church — guitar, lead/tenor vocals; Rudy Lyle — banjo, baritone vocals (stand-in); Joe Stuart — fiddle, baritone vocals (stand-in); Danny Cline — bass (stand-in) | none |
| September–November 1960 | Bill Monroe — mandolin, lead/tenor vocals; Frank Buchanan — guitar, lead/tenor vocals; Tony Ellis — banjo, baritone vocals; Dale Potter — fiddle; Bessie Lee Mauldin — bass | none |
| November–December 1960 | Bill Monroe — mandolin, lead/tenor vocals; Bobby Smith — guitar, lead/tenor vocals (Note: Smith and Ellis did not perform at the recording sessions for Mr. Blue Grass, with session performers Carl Butler and Curtis McPeake playing guitar and banjo, respectively.); Tony Ellis — banjo, baritone vocals; Dale Potter — fiddle; Bessie Lee Mauldin — bass (Note: Mauldin did not perform at the final three-song recording session for Mr. Blue Grass, with Tony Ellis filling in for her.) | Mr. Blue Grass (1961) |
| January–July 1961 | Bill Monroe — mandolin, lead/tenor vocals; Bobby Smith — guitar, lead/tenor vocals; Tony Ellis — banjo, baritone vocals; Bessie Lee Mauldin — bass; Various musicians — fiddle (stand-in) | none |
| July–August 1961 | Bill Monroe — mandolin, lead/tenor vocals; Bobby Smith — guitar, lead/tenor vocals; Bobby Atkins — banjo, baritone vocals; Billy Baker — fiddle, baritone vocals; Bessie Lee Mauldin — bass | none |
| August–October 1961 | Bill Monroe — mandolin, lead/tenor vocals; Bobby Smith — guitar, lead/tenor vocals; Bobby Atkins — banjo, baritone vocals; Vassar Clements — fiddle, baritone vocals; Bessie Lee Mauldin — bass; Neil Rosenberg — banjo (stand-in, September 24, 1961) | none |
| October–November 1961 | Bill Monroe — mandolin, lead/tenor vocals; Jimmy Maynard — guitar, lead/tenor vocals; Curtis McPeake — banjo; Vassar Clements — fiddle, baritone vocals; Bessie Lee Mauldin — bass; Neil Rosenberg — banjo (stand-in, October 22, 1961) | Bluegrass Ramble (1962) (Note: Three tracks on Bluegrass Ramble also feature Buddy Spicher on fiddle; the other three feature Benny Williams on fiddle.) |
| November 1961–January 1962 | Bill Monroe — mandolin, lead/tenor vocals; Jimmy Maynard — guitar, lead/tenor vocals; Curtis McPeake — banjo (Note: McPeake and Williams did not perform at the sessions for Bluegrass Ramble, with Tony Ellis and Bobby Joe Lester playing banjo and fiddle, respectively.); Benny Williams — fiddle, baritone vocals; Buddy Spicher — fiddle; Bessie Lee Mauldin — bass | Bluegrass Ramble (1962) |
| January–March 1962 | Bill Monroe — mandolin, lead/tenor vocals; Jimmy Maynard — guitar, lead/tenor vocals; Tony Ellis — banjo, baritone vocals; Benny Williams — fiddle, baritone vocals; Buddy Spicher — fiddle; Bessie Lee Mauldin — bass | none |
| March–July 1962 | Bill Monroe — mandolin, lead/tenor vocals; Frank Buchanan — guitar, lead/tenor vocals; Tony Ellis — banjo, baritone vocals; Benny Williams — fiddle, baritone vocals; Red Stanley — fiddle, baritone vocals; Bessie Lee Mauldin — bass | Bluegrass Special (1963)^{8}; I'll Meet You in Church Sunday Morning (1964)^{6} (Note: All six tracks also feature session performer Culley Holt on bass vocals; one track also features Ray Edenton on baritone vocals.); Road of Life (1974)^{3} (Note: All three tracks also feature Culley Holt on bass vocals; two tracks also feature Ray Edenton on baritone vocals.) |
| July–August 1962 | Bill Monroe — mandolin, lead/tenor vocals; Frank Buchanan — guitar, lead/tenor vocals; David Deese — banjo, baritone vocals; Benny Williams — fiddle, baritone vocals; Charlie Smith — fiddle, tenor vocals; Bessie Lee Mauldin — bass | none |
| August–late-September 1962 | Bill Monroe — mandolin, lead/tenor vocals; Frank Buchanan — guitar, lead/tenor vocals; Benny Williams — fiddle, baritone vocals; Bessie Lee Mauldin — bass; Ray Goins — banjo (stand-in); Melvin Goins — bass (occasional guest) | none |
| Late-September–early-October 1962 | Bill Monroe — mandolin, lead/tenor vocals; Frank Buchanan — guitar, lead/tenor vocals; Lonnie Hoppers — banjo, baritone vocals; Benny Williams — fiddle, baritone vocals; Bessie Lee Mauldin — bass | none |
| Mid-October 1962—January 1963 | Bill Monroe — mandolin, lead/tenor vocals; Lonnie Hoppers — banjo; Kenny Baker — fiddle, baritone vocals; Bessie Lee Mauldin — bass; Jimmy Maynard — guitar, lead vocals (stand-in, rotating) (Note: Maynard did not perform at any of the recording sessions in November and December 1962.); Joe Stuart — guitar, lead vocals (stand-in, rotating) | Bluegrass Special (1963)^{4}; "Darling Corey" (1964)^{A}; I'll Meet You in Church Sunday Morning (1964)^{4}; "Cindy" (1965); Road of Life (1974)^{1} |
| January–February 1963 | Bill Monroe — mandolin, lead/tenor vocals; Kenny Baker — fiddle, baritone vocals; Bessie Lee Mauldin — bass; Jake Landers — guitar, vocals (stand-in, until early-Feb.); Rual Yarbrough — banjo, vocals (stand-in, until early-Feb.); Jack Cooke — guitar, lead vocals (stand-in, February 8); Del McCoury — banjo, tenor vocals (stand-in, February 8) | none |
| March–May 1963 | Bill Monroe — mandolin, lead/tenor vocals; Del McCoury — guitar, lead/tenor vocals (Note: McCoury did not perform at the recording sessions in March 1963, with Benny Williams and later Jackie Phelps playing guitar in his place.); Bill Keith — banjo, tenor vocals; Kenny Baker — fiddle, baritone vocals; Bessie Lee Mauldin — bass | "Devil's Dream" (1963)^{A}; "Darling Corey" (1964)^{B}; "Mary at the Home Place" (1964)^{B}; Bluegrass Instrumentals (1965)^{2}; Blue Grass Time (1967)^{1}; Classic Bluegrass Instrumentals (1965)^{1} |
| May–June 1963 | Bill Monroe — mandolin, lead/tenor vocals; Del McCoury — guitar, lead/tenor vocals; Bill Keith — banjo, tenor vocals; Bessie Lee Mauldin — bass; Buddy Pendleton – fiddle (stand-in, unknown dates); Bill Sage – fiddle (stand-in, unknown dates); Jim Bessire — bass (stand-in, June 2) | none |
| July–September 1963 | Bill Monroe — mandolin, lead/tenor vocals; Del McCoury — guitar, lead/tenor vocals; Bill Keith — banjo, tenor vocals; Billy Baker – fiddle, baritone vocals; Bessie Lee Mauldin — bass; Ralph Rinzler — bass (additional, July 26, 1963) | none |
| September–December 1963 | Bill Monroe — mandolin, lead/tenor vocals; Del McCoury — guitar, lead/tenor vocals; Bill Keith — banjo, tenor vocals; Joe Stuart – fiddle, baritone vocals; Bessie Lee Mauldin — bass; Jim Bessire — bass (stand-in, September 22, 1963) | none |
| Mid–late-December 1963 | Bill Monroe — mandolin, lead/tenor vocals; Del McCoury — guitar, lead/tenor vocals; Joe Stuart – fiddle, baritone vocals; Bessie Lee Mauldin — bass; Ry Cooder — banjo (stand-in, mid-December); Bobby Diamond — banjo (stand-in, late-December) | none |
| January 1964 | Bill Monroe — mandolin, lead/tenor vocals; Del McCoury — guitar, lead/tenor vocals (Note: McCoury only performed at one of the two sessions in January 1964, with Joe Stuart playing guitar in his place at the first (which featured one of the recordings for I'll Meet You in Church Sunday Morning, "Mary at the Home Place", and the track featured on Saturday Night at the Grand Ole Opry, Vol. 2).); Joe Stuart – banjo, baritone vocals (Note: Joe Drumright performed banjo at both of the January 1964 sessions.); Benny Williams — fiddle, baritone vocals; Billy Baker — fiddle, baritone vocals (Note: Baker did not perform at the January 1964 sessions, with Joe Stuart playing second fiddle in his place.); Bessie Lee Mauldin — bass | I'll Meet You in Church Sunday Morning (1964)^{2}; "Mary at the Home Place" (1964)^{A}; Saturday Night at the Grand Ole Opry, Vol. 2 (1964)^{1}; Blue Grass Time (1967)^{1} |
| February–April 1964 | Bill Monroe — mandolin, lead/tenor vocals; Joe Stuart — banjo, baritone vocals; Benny Williams — fiddle, baritone vocals; Bessie Lee Mauldin — bass; Buddy Spicher — fiddle (stand-in); Jimmy Maynard — guitar, vocals (stand-in, February); Jackie Phelps — guitar, vocals (stand-in, April) | Kentucky Blue Grass (1970)^{3}; Road of Life (1974)^{1} |
| Mid-May 1964 | Bill Monroe — mandolin, lead/tenor vocals; Joe Stuart — banjo, baritone vocals; Benny Williams — fiddle, baritone vocals; Bobby Smith — guitar, lead vocals (stand-in); Ken Marvin — bass, backing vocals (stand-in) | none |
| Late-May–June 1964 | Bill Monroe — mandolin, lead/tenor vocals; Benny Williams — fiddle, baritone vocals; Jimmy Maynard — guitar, lead vocals (stand-in); Ken Marvin — bass, backing vocals (stand-in); Bruce Weathers — banjo (stand-in, late-May); Jimmy Elrod — banjo (stand-in, June) | none |
| Late-June–July 1964 | Bill Monroe — mandolin, lead/tenor vocals; Sandy Rothman — guitar, lead/tenor vocals; Benny Williams — fiddle, baritone vocals; Gene Roberts — banjo (stand-in); Ken Marvin — bass, backing vocals (stand-in) | none |
| July–mid-August 1964 | Bill Monroe — mandolin, lead/tenor vocals; Sandy Rothman — guitar, lead/tenor vocals; Steve Arkin — banjo; Benny Williams — fiddle, baritone vocals; Ken Marvin — bass, backing vocals (stand-in) | none |
| Mid–late-August 1964 | Bill Monroe — mandolin, lead/tenor vocals; Sandy Rothman — guitar, lead/tenor vocals; Don Lineberger — banjo; Benny Williams — fiddle, baritone vocals; Ken Marvin — bass, backing vocals (stand-in) | none |
| Late-August–mid-September 1964 | Bill Monroe — mandolin, lead/tenor vocals; Don Lineberger — banjo; Benny Williams — fiddle, baritone vocals; Ken Marvin — bass, backing vocals (stand-in); Jack Cooke — guitar, vocals (stand-in, unknown dates); Kelly McCormick — guitar, vocals (stand-in, unknown dates); Jimmy Maynard — guitar, vocals (stand-in, unknown dates); Garry Thurmond — guitar, vocals (stand-in, unknown dates) | none |
| Mid-September—mid-October 1964 | Bill Monroe — mandolin, lead/tenor vocals; Jimmy Elrod — guitar, lead/tenor vocals; Don Lineberger — banjo; Benny Williams — fiddle, baritone vocals; Ken Marvin — bass (stand-in, except where noted); Bobby Diamond — bass (stand-in, September 6, 1964); Peter Rowan — guitar, vocals (stand-in, October 9, 1964); Bill Keith — banjo, vocals (stand-in, October 9, 1964); Gene Lowinger — fiddle (stand-in, October 9, 1964); Roger Bush — bass (stand-in, October 9, 1964) | none |
| Mid-October 1964–April 1965 | Bill Monroe — mandolin, lead/tenor vocals; Jimmy Elrod — guitar, lead/tenor vocals; Don Lineberger — banjo; Benny Williams — fiddle, baritone vocals; James Monroe — bass, tenor vocals; Peter Rowan — guitar, vocals (stand-in, October 31, 1964); Bill Keith — banjo, vocals (stand-in, October 31, 1964); Tex Logan — fiddle (stand-in, October 31, 1964); Gene Lowinger — fiddle (stand-in, October 31, 1964); Everett Alan Lilly — bass (stand-in, October 31, 1964); Marvin Hedrick — guitar, vocals (stand-in, Nov. 15, 1964); Del McCoury — guitar, vocals (stand-in, April 2, 1965); Winnie Winston — banjo (stand-in, April 2, 1965); Gene Lowinger — fiddle (stand-in, April 2, 1965); Ronnie McCoury — bass (stand-in, April 2, 1965); Peter Rowan — guitar, vocals (stand-in, early-April 1965); Bill Keith — banjo, vocals (stand-in, early-April 1965) | "I Live in the Past" (1965) (Note: All three songs also feature Buddy Spicher on second fiddle.); Kentucky Blue Grass (1970)^{1} |
| April–early-June 1965 | Bill Monroe — mandolin, lead/tenor vocals; Peter Rowan — guitar, lead/tenor vocals; Don Lineberger — banjo; Benny Williams — fiddle, baritone vocals; James Monroe — bass, tenor vocals | none |
| Early-June–early-August 1965 | Bill Monroe — mandolin, lead/tenor vocals; Peter Rowan — guitar, lead/tenor vocals; Don Lineberger — banjo; Gene Lowinger — fiddle; James Monroe — bass, tenor vocals | none |
| Early-August–early-September 1965 | Bill Monroe — mandolin, lead/tenor vocals; Peter Rowan — guitar, lead/tenor vocals; Gene Lowinger — fiddle; James Monroe — bass, tenor vocals; David Deese — banjo, baritone vocals (stand-in) | none |
| Early-September 1965–early-January 1966 | Bill Monroe — mandolin, lead/tenor vocals; Peter Rowan — guitar, lead/tenor vocals; Lamar Grier — banjo, baritone vocals; Gene Lowinger — fiddle; James Monroe — bass, tenor vocals; J. D. Crowe — banjo (stand-in, September 11, 1965); Neil Rosenberg — banjo (stand-in, September 12, 1965) | none |
| Late-January 1966–early-March 1967 | Bill Monroe — mandolin, lead/tenor vocals; Peter Rowan — guitar, lead/tenor vocals; Lamar Grier — banjo, baritone vocals; Richard Greene — fiddle, bass vocals; James Monroe — bass, tenor vocals; Dick Miller — bass (stand-in, January 27, 1966) | Blue Grass Time (1967)^{10}; Kentucky Blue Grass (1970)^{1} (Note: Two songs recorded on November 3, 1966 also featured Buddy Spicher on second fiddle.); Classic Bluegrass Instrumentals (1987)^{1} |
| Mid–late-March 1967 | Bill Monroe — mandolin, lead/tenor vocals; Curtis Blackwell — guitar, lead/tenor vocals; Lamar Grier — banjo, baritone vocals; Byron Berline — fiddle, bass vocals; James Monroe — bass, tenor vocals | none |
| Late-March–April 29, 1967 | Bill Monroe — mandolin, lead/tenor vocals; Lamar Grier — banjo, baritone vocals; Byron Berline — fiddle, bass vocals; James Monroe — bass, tenor vocals; Myles Sonka — guitar, vocals (stand-in, until early-April); Mitchell Land — guitar, vocals (stand-in, early–mid April); Benny Williams — guitar, vocals (stand-in, mid–late April); Red Allen — guitar, vocals (stand-in, April 29) | none |
| April 30–May 21, 1967 | Bill Monroe — mandolin, lead/tenor vocals; Doug Green — guitar, lead/tenor vocals; Lamar Grier — banjo, baritone vocals; Byron Berline — fiddle, bass vocals; James Monroe — bass, tenor vocals; Paul Wiley — banjo (stand-in, May 5 and 6); Vivian Williams — fiddle (stand-in, May 5 and 6); Paul Williams — bass (stand-in, May 5 and 6); Doug Dillard — banjo (stand-in, May 12); Mitch Jayne — fiddle (stand-in, May 12); Dean Webb — bass (stand-in, May 12); Bob Warford — banjo (stand-in, May 13); Dave Ellison — fiddle (stand-in, May 13); Eric White — bass (stand-in, May 13) | none |
| May 21–late-June 1967 | Bill Monroe — mandolin, lead/tenor vocals; Roland White — guitar, lead/baritone vocals; Lamar Grier — banjo, baritone vocals; Byron Berline — fiddle, bass vocals; James Monroe — bass, tenor vocals | none |
| Late-June–July 1, 1967 | Bill Monroe — mandolin, lead/tenor vocals; Roland White — guitar, lead/baritone vocals; Butch Robins — banjo, baritone vocals; Byron Berline — fiddle, bass vocals; James Monroe — bass, tenor vocals; Lamar Grier — banjo, vocals (stand-in, June 30); Paul Ménard — fiddle (stand-in, June 30) | none |
| July 1–July 23, 1967 | Bill Monroe — mandolin, lead/tenor vocals; Roland White — guitar, lead/baritone vocals; Lamar Grier — banjo, baritone vocals; Byron Berline — fiddle, bass vocals; James Monroe — bass, tenor vocals | none |
| July 27–early-September 1967 | Bill Monroe — mandolin, lead/tenor vocals; Roland White — guitar, lead/baritone vocals; Vic Jordan — banjo; Byron Berline — fiddle, bass vocals; James Monroe — bass, tenor vocals | "Virginia Darlin'" (1968); Kentucky Blue Grass (1970)^{1} |
| September 1967–mid-March 1968 | Bill Monroe — mandolin, lead/tenor vocals; Roland White — guitar, lead/baritone vocals; Vic Jordan — banjo; Benny Williams — fiddle, baritone vocals; James Monroe — bass, tenor vocals | "Train 45" (1968) (Note: "Train 45" also features Vassar Clements on fiddle.); Kentucky Blue Grass (1970)^{1} |
| March 23, 1968 – March 18, 1969 | Bill Monroe — mandolin, lead/tenor vocals; Roland White — guitar, lead/baritone vocals; Vic Jordan — banjo; Kenny Baker — fiddle, baritone vocals; James Monroe — bass, tenor vocals | "Crossing the Cumberlands" (1969); Kentucky Blue Grass (1970)^{1} |
| March 21, 1969 | Bill Monroe — mandolin, lead/tenor vocals; James Monroe — guitar, lead/tenor vocals; Kenny Baker — fiddle, baritone vocals; Doug Green — bass, baritone vocals; Howard Aldridge — banjo (stand-in) | none |
| March 24–mid-July 1969 | Bill Monroe — mandolin, lead/tenor vocals; James Monroe — guitar, lead/tenor vocals; Rual Yarbrough — banjo, baritone vocals; Kenny Baker — fiddle, baritone vocals; Doug Green — bass, baritone vocals; Joe Zinkan — bass (session stand-in) | "Fireball Mail" (1969) (Note: The two recording sessions during this period each feature a second fiddler: Red Hayes is featured on "Fireball Mail" and one song on Uncle Pen, while Tommy Williams is featured on "With Body and Soul" (the B-side to "Fireball Mail"), the Kentucky Blue Grass track, and the second Uncle Pen track.); Kentucky Blue Grass (1970)^{1}; Uncle Pen (1972)^{2} |
| Mid-July–late-December 1969 | Bill Monroe — mandolin, lead/tenor vocals; James Monroe — guitar, lead/tenor vocals; Rual Yarbrough — banjo, baritone vocals; Kenny Baker — fiddle, baritone vocals; Bill Yates — bass, bass vocals | "Walk Softly on My Heart" (1970)^{A} (Note: "Walk Softly on My Heart" and one of the two tracks for Uncle Pen also feature Red Hayes on fiddle.); "Goin' Up Caney" (1971)^{A}; Uncle Pen (1972)^{2} |
| Late-December 1969–January 1970 | Bill Monroe — mandolin, lead/tenor vocals; James Monroe — guitar, lead/tenor vocals; Rual Yarbrough — banjo, baritone vocals; Kenny Baker — fiddle, baritone vocals; Earl Snead — bass (touring stand-in); Joe Zinkan — bass (session stand-in) | "Walk Softly on My Heart" (1970)^{B}; Uncle Pen (1972)^{1} |
| February–late-September 1970 | Bill Monroe — mandolin, lead/tenor vocals; James Monroe — guitar, lead/tenor vocals; Rual Yarbrough — banjo, baritone vocals; Kenny Baker — fiddle, baritone vocals; Skip Payne — bass, bass vocals (Note: Payne did not perform at the one recording session by the February–September 1970 lineup, after returning home to be with his father, who had suffered a heart attack.) | Road of Life (1974)^{4} (Note: All four tracks recorded at the March 26, 1970 session also feature Culley Holt on bass vocals.) |
| Late-September–late-December 1970 | Bill Monroe — mandolin, lead/tenor vocals; James Monroe — guitar, lead/tenor vocals; Rual Yarbrough — banjo, baritone vocals; Kenny Baker — fiddle, baritone vocals; Joe Stuart — bass, baritone vocals; Bobby Thompson — banjo (session stand-in) | Bill Monroe's Country Music Hall of Fame (1971)^{3} (Note: All five tracks recorded at the December 1970 sessions also feature Red Hayes on fiddle and Gordon Terry on fiddle or guitar.); "Goin' Up Caney" (1971)^{B}; "My Old Kentucky and You" (1972)^{B} |
| Late-December 1970–early-January 1971 | Bill Monroe — mandolin, lead/tenor vocals; James Monroe — guitar, lead/tenor vocals; R. C. Harris — banjo, baritone vocals; Kenny Baker — fiddle, baritone vocals; Joe Stuart — bass, baritone vocals | none |
| Early–late-January 1971 | Bill Monroe — mandolin, lead/tenor vocals; James Monroe — guitar, lead/tenor vocals; Earl Snead — banjo; Kenny Baker — fiddle, baritone vocals; Joe Stuart — bass, baritone vocals | Bill Monroe's Country Music Hall of Fame (1971)^{3}; Uncle Pen (1972)^{5} (Note: Bobby Thompson filled in for Earl Snead at the band's January 15 and 20, 1971 recording sessions; Buddy Spicher also performed at the latter, at which two tracks for Uncle Pen and one for Sings Bluegrass, Body and Soul were recorded.); Sings Bluegrass, Body and Soul (1977)^{1} |
| Late-January–early-April 1971 | Bill Monroe — mandolin, lead/tenor vocals; James Monroe — guitar, lead/tenor vocals; R. C. Harris — banjo, baritone vocals; Kenny Baker — fiddle, baritone vocals; Joe Stuart — bass, baritone vocals | none |
| Early–late-April 1971 | Bill Monroe — mandolin, lead/tenor vocals; James Monroe — guitar, lead/tenor vocals; R. C. Harris — banjo, baritone vocals; Kenny Baker — fiddle, baritone vocals; Joe Stuart — fiddle, baritone vocals; Travis Stewart — bass, tenor vocals | none |
| Late-April–June 20, 1971 | Bill Monroe — mandolin, lead/tenor vocals; Travis Stewart — guitar, lead/tenor vocals; Jack Hicks — banjo; Kenny Baker — fiddle, baritone vocals; Joe Stuart — bass, baritone vocals | none |
| June 26–August 26, 1971 | Bill Monroe — mandolin, lead/tenor vocals; Dan Jones — guitar, lead/tenor vocals; Jack Hicks — banjo; Kenny Baker — fiddle, baritone vocals; Joe Stuart — fiddle, baritone vocals; Doug Hutchens — bass | none |
| August 26–August 28, 1971 | Bill Monroe — mandolin, lead/tenor vocals; Joe Stuart — guitar, lead/tenor vocals; Jack Hicks — banjo; Kenny Baker — fiddle, baritone vocals; Doug Hutchens — bass | none |
| Early-September 1971 | Bill Monroe — mandolin, lead/tenor vocals; Joe Stuart — guitar, lead/tenor vocals; Jack Hicks — banjo; Kenny Baker — fiddle, baritone vocals; Various musicians — bass (stand-ins) | none |
| September 1971–early-March 1973 | Bill Monroe — mandolin, lead/tenor vocals; Joe Stuart — guitar, lead/tenor vocals; Jack Hicks — banjo; Kenny Baker — fiddle, baritone vocals; Monroe Fields — bass, baritone vocals | "My Old Kentucky and You" (1972)^{A} |
| March 12–early-April 1973 | Bill Monroe — mandolin, lead/tenor vocals; Bob Fowler — guitar, lead/tenor vocals; Jack Hicks — banjo; Kenny Baker — fiddle, baritone vocals; Monroe Fields — bass, baritone vocals | none |
| April 13–mid-July 1973 | Bill Monroe — mandolin, lead/tenor vocals; Bob Fowler — guitar, lead/tenor vocals; Jack Hicks — banjo; Kenny Baker — fiddle, baritone vocals; Guy Stevenson — bass | Bean Blossom (1973) |
| July 19–September 9, 1973 | Bill Monroe — mandolin, lead/tenor vocals; Bill Box — guitar, lead/tenor vocals; Jack Hicks — banjo; Kenny Baker — fiddle, baritone vocals; Gregg Kennedy — bass, backing vocals | none |
| Mid-September 1973 | Bill Monroe — mandolin, lead/tenor vocals; Bill Box — guitar, lead/tenor vocals; Kenny Baker — fiddle, baritone vocals; Gregg Kennedy — bass, backing vocals; Richard Hefner — banjo, backing vocals (stand-in) | none |
| September 18–November 4, 1973 | Bill Monroe — mandolin, lead/tenor vocals; Bill Box — guitar, lead/tenor vocals; Ben Pedigo — banjo, backing vocals; Kenny Baker — fiddle, baritone vocals; Gregg Kennedy — bass, backing vocals | none |
| November 5–December 12, 1973 | Bill Monroe — mandolin, lead/tenor vocals; Bill Box — guitar, lead/tenor vocals; Kenny Baker — fiddle, baritone vocals; Gregg Kennedy — bass, backing vocals; Randy Chapman — banjo, vocals (stand-in, Nov. 8 and 11); Larry Bartosh — banjo, vocals (stand-in, Nov. 24); Jim Moratto — banjo, vocals (stand-in, unknown dates) | none |
| December 13, 1973–mid-July 1974 | Bill Monroe — mandolin, lead/tenor vocals; Bill Box — guitar, lead/tenor vocals; Jim Moratto — banjo, backing vocals; Kenny Baker — fiddle, baritone vocals; Gregg Kennedy — bass, backing vocals | |
| Late-July–September 19, 1974 | Bill Monroe — mandolin, lead/tenor vocals; Ralph Lewis — guitar, lead/tenor vocals; Dwight Dillman — banjo; Kenny Baker — fiddle, baritone vocals; Randy Davis — bass, baritone vocals | |
| September 20, 1974–late-February 1976 | Bill Monroe — mandolin, lead/tenor vocals; Ralph Lewis — guitar, lead/tenor vocals; Bob Black — banjo, baritone vocals; Kenny Baker — fiddle, baritone vocals; Randy Davis — bass, baritone vocals; Jack Cooke — guitar, vocals (stand-in, Nov. 1, 1974); Wayne Shrubsall — banjo, vocals (stand-in, Nov. 1, 1974); Johnny Montgomery — bass (stand-in, Nov. 1, 1974); John Hedgecoth — banjo (stand-in, February 1975) | The Weary Traveler (1976) (Note: Weary Traveler also features James Monroe on guitar and Joe Stuart on fiddle and guitar.) |
| Late-February–mid-May 1976 | Bill Monroe — mandolin, lead/tenor vocals; Bob Jones — guitar, lead/tenor vocals; Bob Black — banjo, baritone vocals; Kenny Baker — fiddle, baritone vocals; Randy Davis — bass, baritone vocals | none |
| Late-May–mid-September 1976 | Bill Monroe — mandolin, lead/tenor vocals; Wayne Lewis — guitar, lead/tenor vocals; Bob Black — banjo, baritone vocals; Kenny Baker — fiddle, baritone vocals; Randy Davis — bass, baritone vocals; Tom Mullen — mandolin (stand-in, August 28) | none |
| Mid-September 1976–mid-March 1977 | Bill Monroe — mandolin, lead/tenor vocals; Wayne Lewis — guitar, lead/tenor vocals; Bill Holden — banjo, baritone vocals; Kenny Baker — fiddle, baritone vocals; Randy Davis — bass, baritone vocals | Sings Bluegrass, Body and Soul (1977)^{6} (Note: All six tracks also feature James Monroe on guitar, Joe Stuart and Blaine Sprouse on fiddles.) |
| Mid–late-March 1977 | Bill Monroe — mandolin, lead/tenor vocals; Wayne Lewis — guitar, lead/tenor vocals; Kenny Baker — fiddle, baritone vocals; Randy Davis — bass, baritone vocals; Alan O'Bryant — banjo, baritone vocals (stand-in) | none |
| Late-March–late-June 1977 | Bill Monroe — mandolin, lead/tenor vocals; Wayne Lewis — guitar, lead/tenor vocals; Larry Beasley — banjo, baritone vocals; Kenny Baker — fiddle, baritone vocals; Randy Davis — bass, baritone vocals | none |
| Late-June–early-August 1977 | Bill Monroe — mandolin, lead/tenor vocals; Wayne Lewis — guitar, lead/tenor vocals; Bill Holden — banjo, baritone vocals; Kenny Baker — fiddle, baritone vocals; Randy Davis — bass, baritone vocals; Jim Brock — fiddle (touring stand-in, July); Buddy Spicher — fiddle (session stand-in, late-July) | Bluegrass Memories (1977) (Note: Bluegrass Memories also features James Monroe on guitar.) |
| September 2, 1977–mid-June 1979 | Bill Monroe — mandolin, lead/tenor vocals; Wayne Lewis — guitar, lead/tenor vocals; Butch Robins — banjo, baritone vocals; Kenny Baker — fiddle, baritone vocals; Randy Davis — bass, baritone vocals; James Bryan — fiddle (stand-in, mid-Aug.–early-Oct. 1977); Jim Brock — fiddle (stand-in, unknown 1978 and 1979) | Bean Blossom '79 (1980) |
| Mid–late-June 1979 | Bill Monroe — mandolin, lead/tenor vocals; Wayne Lewis — guitar, lead/tenor vocals; Butch Robins — banjo, baritone vocals; Kenny Baker — fiddle, baritone vocals; Raymond Huffmaster — bass (stand-in) | none |
| Late-June 1979–July 2, 1981 | Bill Monroe — mandolin, lead/tenor vocals; Wayne Lewis — guitar, lead/tenor vocals; Butch Robins — banjo, baritone vocals; Kenny Baker — fiddle, baritone vocals; Mark Hembree — bass, bass vocals | Master of Bluegrass (1981) (Note: Four tracks on Master of Bluegrass also feature Norman Blake on guitar and Jesse McReynolds and Larry Sledge on mandolins.) |
| Early–late-July 1981 | Bill Monroe — mandolin, lead/tenor vocals; Wayne Lewis — guitar, lead/tenor vocals; Kenny Baker — fiddle, baritone vocals; Mark Hembree — bass, bass vocals; Paul Kovac — banjo, baritone vocals (stand-in, July 5); R. C. Harris — banjo, vocals (stand-in, mid–late-July) | none |
| Late-July 1981–mid-June 1984 | Bill Monroe — mandolin, lead/tenor vocals; Wayne Lewis — guitar, lead/tenor vocals; Blake Williams — banjo, baritone vocals; Kenny Baker — fiddle, baritone vocals; Mark Hembree — bass, bass vocals; Tim Smith — fiddle (stand-in, October 18, 1981); Ray Legere — mandolin (stand-in, July 1982) | Bill Monroe and Friends (1984) |
| Mid–late-June 1984 | Bill Monroe — mandolin, lead/tenor vocals; Wayne Lewis — guitar, lead/tenor vocals; Blake Williams — banjo, baritone vocals; Kenny Baker — fiddle, baritone vocals; Johnnie Baker — bass (stand-in) | none |
| Late-June–October 12, 1984 | Bill Monroe — mandolin, lead/tenor vocals; Wayne Lewis — guitar, lead/tenor vocals; Blake Williams — banjo, baritone vocals; Kenny Baker — fiddle, baritone vocals; Tater Tate — bass, bass vocals | none |
| Mid-October–late-November 1984 | Bill Monroe — mandolin, lead/tenor vocals; Wayne Lewis — guitar, lead/tenor vocals; Blake Williams — banjo, baritone vocals; Tater Tate — fiddle, bass vocals; Paul Squyres — bass (stand-in, mid-October); Paul Sato — bass (stand-in, October 18); Tatsuya Imai — bass (stand-in, October 21–24); Sab Watanabe — bass (stand-in, October 27); Randall Franks — bass, fiddle (stand-in, Oct. 30–Nov. 7); Roger Aycock — bass (stand-in, unknown dates) | none |
| Late-November 1984–mid-March 1985 | Bill Monroe — mandolin, lead/tenor vocals; Wayne Lewis — guitar, lead/tenor vocals; Blake Williams — banjo, baritone vocals; Dale Morris — fiddle, backing vocals; Tater Tate — bass, bass vocals | none |
| Mid-March 1985–mid-February 1986 | Bill Monroe — mandolin, lead/tenor vocals; Wayne Lewis — guitar, lead/tenor vocals; Blake Williams — banjo, baritone vocals; Glen Duncan — fiddle, backing vocals; Tater Tate — bass, bass vocals; Joe Stuart — guitar, vocals (stand-in, January 10–12) | Stars of the Bluegrass Hall of Fame (1985); Bluegrass '87 (1987)^{3} |
| Mid-February–mid-March 1986 | Bill Monroe — mandolin, lead/tenor vocals; Wayne Lewis — guitar, lead/tenor vocals; Blake Williams — banjo, baritone vocals; Art Stamper — fiddle, backing vocals; Tater Tate — bass, bass vocals | none |
| Mid-March 1986 | Bill Monroe — mandolin, lead/tenor vocals; Wayne Lewis — guitar, lead/tenor vocals; Blake Williams — banjo, baritone vocals; Tater Tate — fiddle/bass, bass vocals; Unknown musician — bass (touring stand-in); Buddy Spicher — fiddle (session stand-in) | Bluegrass '87 (1987)^{4} |
| Late-March–May 1986 | Bill Monroe — mandolin, lead/tenor vocals; Wayne Lewis — guitar, lead/tenor vocals; Blake Williams — banjo, baritone vocals; Tater Tate — fiddle, bass vocals; Johnny Montgomery — bass | none |
| May–early-September 1986 | Bill Monroe — mandolin, lead/tenor vocals; Tom Ewing — guitar, lead/baritone vocals; Blake Williams — banjo, baritone vocals; Tater Tate — fiddle, bass vocals; Johnny Montgomery — bass | Bluegrass '87 (1987)^{1} (Note: The final track recorded for Bluegrass '87 also features Buddy Spicher on fiddle.) |
| Early–late-September 1986 | Bill Monroe — mandolin, lead/tenor vocals; Tom Ewing — guitar, lead/baritone vocals; Blake Williams — banjo, baritone vocals; Tater Tate — fiddle, bass vocals; Kenny Jones — bass (stand-in, early-September); Roy Huskey Jr. – bass (stand-in, September 17); Forrest Rose — bass (stand-in, late-September) | none |
| Late-September–mid-November 1986 | Bill Monroe — mandolin, lead/tenor vocals; Tom Ewing — guitar, lead/baritone vocals; Blake Williams — banjo, baritone vocals; Mark Squires — fiddle, backing vocals; Tater Tate — bass, bass vocals | none |
| Mid-November 1986–late-August 1987 | Bill Monroe — mandolin, lead/tenor vocals; Tom Ewing — guitar, lead/baritone vocals; Blake Williams — banjo, baritone vocals; Billy Joe Foster — fiddle, backing vocals; Tater Tate — bass, bass vocals | none |
| Late-August 1987–March 27, 1988 | Bill Monroe — mandolin, lead/tenor vocals; Tom Ewing — guitar, lead/baritone vocals; Blake Williams — banjo, baritone vocals; Mike Feagan — fiddle, backing vocals; Tater Tate — bass, bass vocals; Billy Rose — bass, vocals (stand-in, February 19–25, 1988) | Southern Flavor (1988) (Note: Southern Flavor also features Buddy Spicher and Bobby Hicks on fiddle; three tracks also feature Emory Gordy Jr. on bass.) |
| Late-March–mid-April 1988 | Bill Monroe — mandolin, lead/tenor vocals; Blake Williams — banjo, baritone vocals; Mike Feagan — fiddle, backing vocals; Tater Tate — bass, bass vocals; Wayne Lewis — guitar, lead vocals (stand-in) | |
| April 15–May 29, 1988 | Bill Monroe — mandolin, lead/tenor vocals; Tom Ewing — guitar, lead/baritone vocals; Blake Williams — banjo, baritone vocals; Mike Feagan — fiddle, backing vocals; Tater Tate — bass, bass vocals | none |
| May 30–September 19, 1988 | Bill Monroe — mandolin, lead/tenor vocals; Tom Ewing — guitar, lead/baritone vocals; Blake Williams — banjo, baritone vocals; Billy Joe Foster — fiddle, backing vocals; Tater Tate — bass, bass vocals | none |
| Late-September–early-December 1988 | Bill Monroe — mandolin, lead/tenor vocals; Tom Ewing — guitar, lead/baritone vocals; Blake Williams — banjo, baritone vocals; Tater Tate — bass, bass vocals; Blaine Sprouse — fiddle (stand-in, September 23–25); Buddy Spicher — fiddle (stand-in, October–November); Billy Rose — bass, vocals (stand-in, November 3–6) | none |
| December 9–December 31, 1988 | Bill Monroe — mandolin, lead/tenor vocals; Tom Ewing — guitar, lead/baritone vocals; Blake Williams — banjo, baritone vocals; Wayne Jerrolds — fiddle; Tater Tate — bass, bass vocals | none |
| Early-January–late-March 1989 | Bill Monroe — mandolin, lead/tenor vocals; Scottie Baugus — guitar, lead vocals; Blake Williams — banjo, baritone vocals; Wayne Jerrolds — fiddle; Tater Tate — bass, bass vocals | none |
| Late-March 1989–late-August 1990 | Bill Monroe — mandolin, lead/tenor vocals; Tom Ewing — guitar, lead/baritone vocals; Blake Williams — banjo, baritone vocals; Tater Tate — fiddle, bass vocals; Billy Rose — bass, backing vocals; Jimmy Campbell — fiddle (additional, October 28, 1989) | Live at the Opry (1989); Cryin' Holy unto the Lord (1991) |
| Late-August 1990–September 21, 1991 | Bill Monroe — mandolin, lead/tenor vocals; Tom Ewing — guitar, lead/baritone vocals; Blake Williams — banjo, baritone vocals; Jimmy Campbell — fiddle, backing vocals; Tater Tate — bass, bass vocals | none |
| September 22, 1991 – January 4, 1993 | Bill Monroe — mandolin, lead/tenor vocals; Tom Ewing — guitar, lead/baritone vocals; Dana Cupp — banjo, backing vocals; Jimmy Campbell — fiddle, backing vocals; Tater Tate — bass, bass vocals | none |
| January 5–January 14, 1993 | Bill Monroe — mandolin, lead/tenor vocals; Tom Ewing — guitar, lead/baritone vocals; Dana Cupp — banjo, backing vocals; Tater Tate — fiddle, bass vocals; Unknown musician — bass (stand-in) | none |
| January 15, 1993–November 1995 | Bill Monroe — mandolin, lead/tenor vocals; Tom Ewing — guitar, lead/baritone vocals; Dana Cupp — banjo, backing vocals; Robert Bowlin — fiddle, backing vocals; Tater Tate — bass, bass vocals; Ernie Sykes — bass (stand-in, late-August 1993); Mark Kuykendall — bass (stand-in, from Dec. 1993); Raymond McLain — bass (stand-in, June 23, 1994); Rick Campbell — fiddle (stand-in, July 1994); Ronnie McCoury — guitar (stand-in, November 4, 1994); Bryan Sutton — mandolin (stand-in, spring 1995); Mike Bub — banjo (stand-in, June 27, 1995); Ernie Sykes — bass (stand-in, June 27, 1995); Mike Bub — bass (stand-in, November 10, 1995) | The Music of Bill Monroe from 1936 to 1994 (1994) — one track, "Boston Boy" |
| November 1995–September 9, 1996 | Bill Monroe — mandolin, lead/tenor vocals; Tom Ewing — guitar, lead/baritone vocals; Dana Cupp — banjo, backing vocals; Robert Bowlin — fiddle, backing vocals; Tater Tate — fiddle, bass vocals (part-time); Ernie Sykes — bass, backing vocals | none |

== Bibliography ==
- Ewing, Tom (September 7, 2018), Bill Monroe: The Life and Music of the Blue Grass Man (Music in American Life), Champaign, Illinois: University of Illinois Press, ISBN 978-0252041891
- Rosenberg, Neil V.; Wolfe, Charles K. (June 7, 2007), The Music of Bill Monroe: Music in American Life, Champaign, Illinois: University of Illinois Press, ISBN 978-0252031212
