= List of Clinch Mountain Boys members (1946–1966) =

Ralph Stanley (right) performing in 2011 with Clinch Mountain Boys members Dewey Brown (far left), James Alan Shelton (middle left) and Mitchell Van Dyke (middle right).

The Clinch Mountain Boys were the backing band for bluegrass duo the Stanley Brothers. Formed in November 1946, the group were active until the death of guitarist and lead vocalist Carter Stanley in December 1966. Banjo player Ralph Stanley later revived the moniker for his own backing band, which remained active until his own death in June 2016. In addition to the Stanley Brothers, the band's original lineup featured mandolin player Darrell "Pee Wee" Lambert and fiddler Bobby Sumner, the latter of whom was soon replaced by Leslie Keith and joined by bassist Ray Lambert. By the time of Carter Stanley's death, the brothers were joined by George Shuffler on guitar (a regular member during various tenures from 1952) and Melvin Goins on bass (who joined at the beginning of 1966).

== History ==
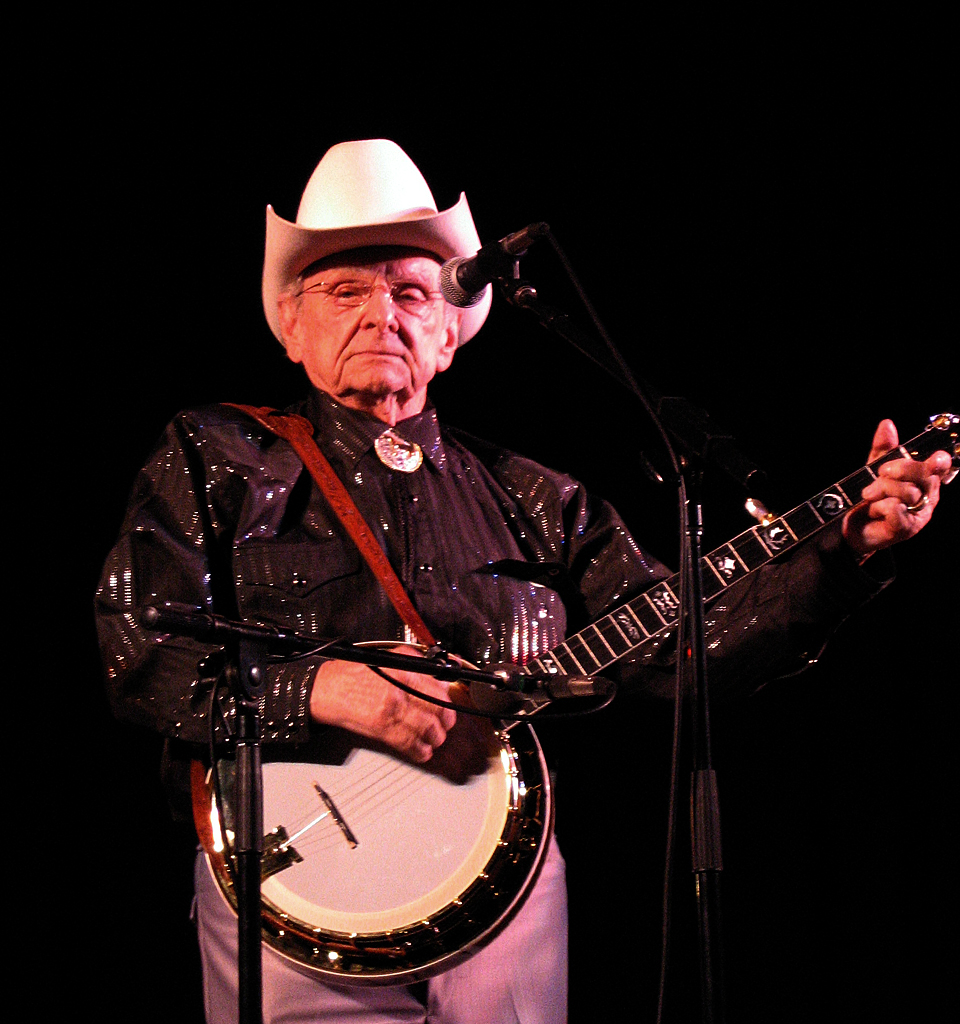
The Stanley Brothers started working together just a couple of weeks after Ralph Stanley's discharge from the army.

=== 1946–1952 ===
Carter and Ralph Stanley began working together as the Stanley Brothers in early November 1946, shortly after the latter's discharge from the army the month before (Carter had been discharged that February). They built the initial lineup of their band, which they called the Clinch Mountain Boys (CMB), with the addition of mandolinist Darrell "Pee Wee" Lambert and fiddler Bobby Sumner, and started performing on the new Bristol, Virginia radio station WCYB in December. Early the next year, the band added Ray Lambert (no relation to Pee Wee) on bass, with Leslie Keith replacing Sumner around the same time. The group's first recording session took place in mid-1947, at which the five-piece recorded four songs for Rich-R-Tone Records. By the time of their second session for the label in "the latter part of 1947 or the early part of 1948", Ray Lambert had left the band. The outfit continued without a bassist for their third and final Rich-R-Tone session, which featured Art Wooten in place of Keith, who left to form his own group.

The Stanley Brothers relocated to Raleigh, North Carolina in July 1948, started working on WPTF, and later signed with Columbia Records in October. By January 1949 they had returned to Bristol and WCYB, when they brought back Bobby Sumner and added Jay Hughes on bass. The new lineup recorded for Columbia in March, before Sumner was replaced in June by 18-year-old Lester Woodie. For their next session in November 1949 (just after they relocated to Winston-Salem, North Carolina), the band worked with session bassist Ernie Newton. They took a brief hiatus in the spring of 1950, returning that July as a four-piece without a bassist for a brief stint in Huntington, West Virginia, before relocating to Shreveport, Louisiana and later Lexington, Kentucky. They completed their third Columbia session in November, again with Newton on bass.

In February 1951, the group moved back to Bristol, Virginia, where they added bassist John Shuffler to their lineup. This incarnation was short-lived, however, as by June Shuffler (and fiddler Woodie) had been drafted by the military; the group subsequently took a short hiatus, as Carter Stanley briefly joined Bill Monroe's Blue Grass Boys. When the Stanley Brothers reunited in October, they built a new lineup of the CMB with returning fiddler Bobby Sumner and new members Bobby Osborne on mandolin and Charlie Cline on bass. Osborne was drafted into the U.S. Marine Corps after "about six weeks" and replaced by John "Curly" Seckler in December, who arranged for the band's return to Lexington, Kentucky in the new year. Here, George Shuffler was brought in to replace Cline and Pee Wee Lambert briefly returned. In April 1952, the Stanley Brothers and Shuffler recorded their final four tracks for Columbia with session fiddler Art Wooten.

=== 1952–1957 ===
After their final Columbia session, the Stanley Brothers, George Shuffler and fiddler Art Stamper briefly worked in Pikeville, Kentucky, before moving to Oak Hill, West Virginia and adding "Big" Jim Williams on mandolin. Their next recording session took place in the summer for former label Rich-R-Tone Records. By the end of the year, the group had returned to Bristol, Virginia and started another hiatus due to a "scarcity of shows", from which they returned the following spring. The band signed with Mercury Records and had their first session for the label in August 1953, by which time Shuffler was no longer an official "full-time member" of the band, but was performing in a "guest" capacity. Shuffler's younger brother John took over on bass after the session and Stamper left in September after being drafted. After a few weeks without a fiddler, Don "Chubby" Anthony took over in November. As Carter felt that Anthony's playing was "not fully developed", Ralph Mayo played fiddle at the band's next session that month.

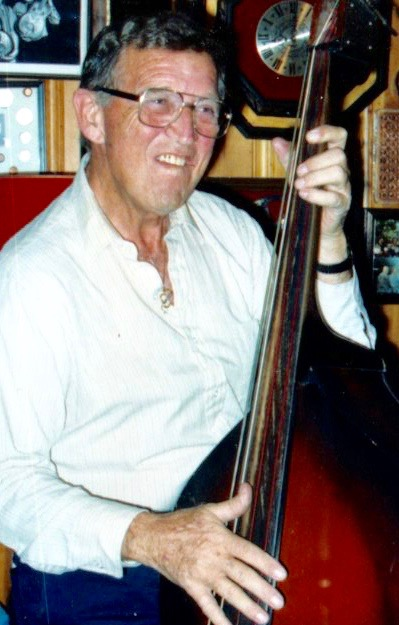
The band's recording sessions in 1954 all featured session musician Floyd "Lightnin'" Chance on string bass.

"Around Christmastime" of 1953, Shuffler left the CMB again. Ralph "Joe" Meadows also replaced Anthony. For the group's third Mercury recording in May 1954, session musician Floyd "Lightnin'" Chance played bass. The next session, in August, saw Bill Lowe replace Williams on mandolin, with Chance returning on bass and Charlie Cline a guest on guitar. Chance also performed at the third and final session that year, in November. Williams had returned to the band by early 1955, prompting Lowe to switch to bass in time for the band's first session of the year in April. Shortly after the session, Meadows left the band. He was not immediately replaced, with the Stanley Brothers, Williams and new bassist Doug Morris performing as a four-piece in the summer. Later in the summer, the band performed with Ralph Mayo on fiddle and George Shuffler on bass.

Around October 1955, Richard "Curley" Lambert joined on mandolin and Art Stamper returned on fiddle; both performed at the band's next session in December, which also featured Bill Lowe standing in on bass. Stamper had left again by January 1956, with Mayo returning in time for a recorded show in March. Another recording from June featured Chubby Anthony on fiddle and Doug Morris on bass and another from July featured Lindy Clear in place of Morris. The band's next recording session in mid-July featured twin fiddles for the first time, with Mayo performing as a "guest", and was the first to feature Morris on bass (in place of regular bassist Clear). A show recorded at the end of July featured Clear, before George Shuffler featured at a show recorded early in August. The band were largely inactive over the next few months, save for two sessions in early 1957, the first of which featured Shuffler on mandolin and Mervin "Red" Malone guesting on bass, and the second with Shuffler back on bass and former CMB member Pee Wee Lambert on mandolin.

=== 1957–1960 ===
After the February 1957 recordings, the band returned to touring with the lineup they had the previous summer: Curley Lambert on mandolin, Chubby Anthony on fiddle and Lindy Clear on bass. By the second half of May, Lambert and Clear had been replaced by Frank Wakefield and Vernon "Jack" Cooke, respectively, although Wakefield left within a couple of weeks and the band became a four-piece. By mid-June, Bill Napier had taken over on mandolin and Anthony had left the band. For their next session in November, the Stanley Brothers and the CMB were joined by twin session fiddlers Benny Martin and Howdy Forrester, as well as steel guitarist "Little" Roy Wiggins on one song (their only recording to feature the instrument). In March 1958, the band recorded the single "No School Bus in Heaven" (about the Prestonsburg, Kentucky, bus crash) with stand-in bassist Curly King.

In the spring of 1958, the band performed with a full five-piece lineup after fiddler Ralph Mayo briefly rejoined. In August, they completed their first session for Starday Records, after their deal with Mercury was "allowed to lapse" earlier in the year. The recording lineup featured full-time members Napier and new bassist Al Elliott, plus session contributors Joe and Lowell "Gene" Meadows on fiddle and guitar, respectively. For shows in the summer, fiddle was performed by Benny Williams. For a show in September, fiddle was played by Pete Kuykendall, who was also recording the show for later release. At the end of September, the Stanley Brothers changed labels again, this time to King Records, for whom they recorded a self-titled debut studio album on September 30 and October 1, 1958. Paul "Moon" Mullins, who had taken over on fiddle after the show with Kuykendall, did not perform at either of the sessions; instead, Ralph Mayo stepped in for both sets of recordings.

During the 1958 Christmas break, the band went through a few lineup changes, as Napier left and Chubby Anthony returned on fiddle, with Elliott switching to mandolin and Mullins briefly switching to bass. By January 1959, however, Mullins had left, with George Shuffler brought in to play at the band's next two sessions in February (where they recorded Hymns and Sacred Songs). Shortly after the sessions, Napier returned to the band. Elliott left in mid-May ahead of the birth of his first child; he was replaced by Lindy Clear for a run of shows, then by Johnnie Bonds starting with a session in July. Later in the summer, the group recorded two songs for Blue Ridge Records. Over the course of two days in mid-September, they recorded the albums Everybody's Country Favorites and For the Good People, with George Shuffler on bass. Bonds had left by the beginning of 1960, with a four-song session around January featuring local musician Bill Slaughter on bass (and Ralph Mayo on fiddle).

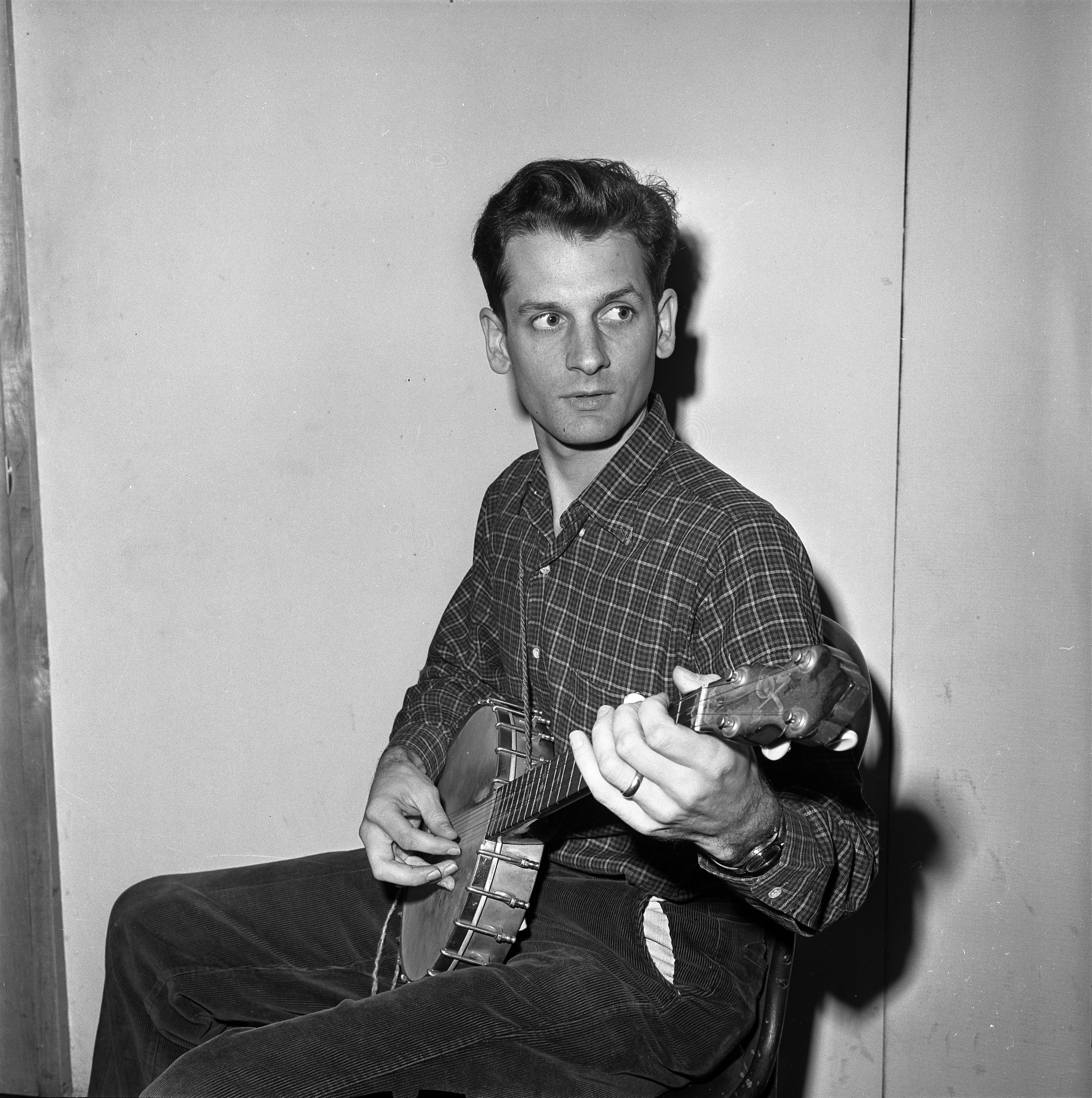
Mike Seeger recorded several of the band's shows, as well as standing in for Chick Stripling at a show in February 1961.

=== 1960–1965 ===
After their first recording session of 1960, the band performed on radio for a few months with rotating fiddlers Chubby Anthony and Ralph Mayo and stand-in bassist George Shuffler. In the spring, Curley Lambert replaced Bill Napier on mandolin, Lindy Clear returned on bass, and Mayo cemented his place in the lineup. Recordings around June featured session bassist Audie Webster, with a session in July featuring Shuffler and introducing fiddler Vernon Derrick to the band's lineup. Derrick did not perform at the band's first sessions of 1961 in January, with Art Stamper brought in as a guest by Carter Stanley. Shortly after the sessions, James "Chick" Stripling took over as the group's bassist. When he was unable to take part in a string of shows in the spring, he was replaced by stand-ins Mike Seeger, Jack Cooke and Tom Gray (of the Country Gentlemen).

By the summer of 1961, Al Elliott and Chubby Anthony had returned on mandolin and fiddle, respectively. With Stripling still unavailable, Shuffler played bass at the band's July session and overdubbed bass on live recordings made in August. At a session in September, Anthony doubled up on fiddle and bass. Anthony had left by the end of the year. Stripling subsequently returned and the four-piece group toured into 1962, with several live recordings from March surfacing on later releases. Ralph Mayo featured on fiddle for three days of recording in early May, which included tracking the album Good Old Camp Meeting Songs. During the summer, the Stanleys and Shuffler played a series of shows with returning members Curley Lambert (mandolin) and Vernon Derrick (fiddle), plus guest Roger Bush standing in on bass following Stripling's departure. For a show in November, Shuffler was absent and bass was performed by Carl Chatzky (under the alias Carl Hawkins).

At the beginning of 1963, the Stanley Brothers recorded Folk Concert with Lambert, Derrick and returning session fiddler Ralph Mayo. During the summer, Shuffler returned on guitar and Henry Dockery took over on bass. They recorded The Country Folk Music Spotlight and America's Finest 5-String Banjo Hootenanny in August and September. A series of radio performances in December also featured Jack Cooke as a guest performer. In April 1964, the core trio recorded Hymns of the Cross with session mandolinist Earl Taylor and bassist Chick Stripling. Sessions in July for Bluegrass Songs for You featured Taylor, fiddler Art Stamper and bassist Vernon McIntyre. Harold "Red" Stanley joined on fiddle just after the recordings, debuting at a string of shows which featured stand-in bassist Benny Birchfield from the Osborne Brothers' band. In the fall, the Stanley Brothers and Stanley recorded with stand-in guitarist Jack Cooke and bassist Barry Glickman, releasing John's Gospel Quartet and Songs of Mother and Home under the alias "John's Gospel Quartet". Larry Sparks took over on guitar from late 1964 to early 1965, performing with stand-in bassist Ray Tate.

=== 1965–1966 ===
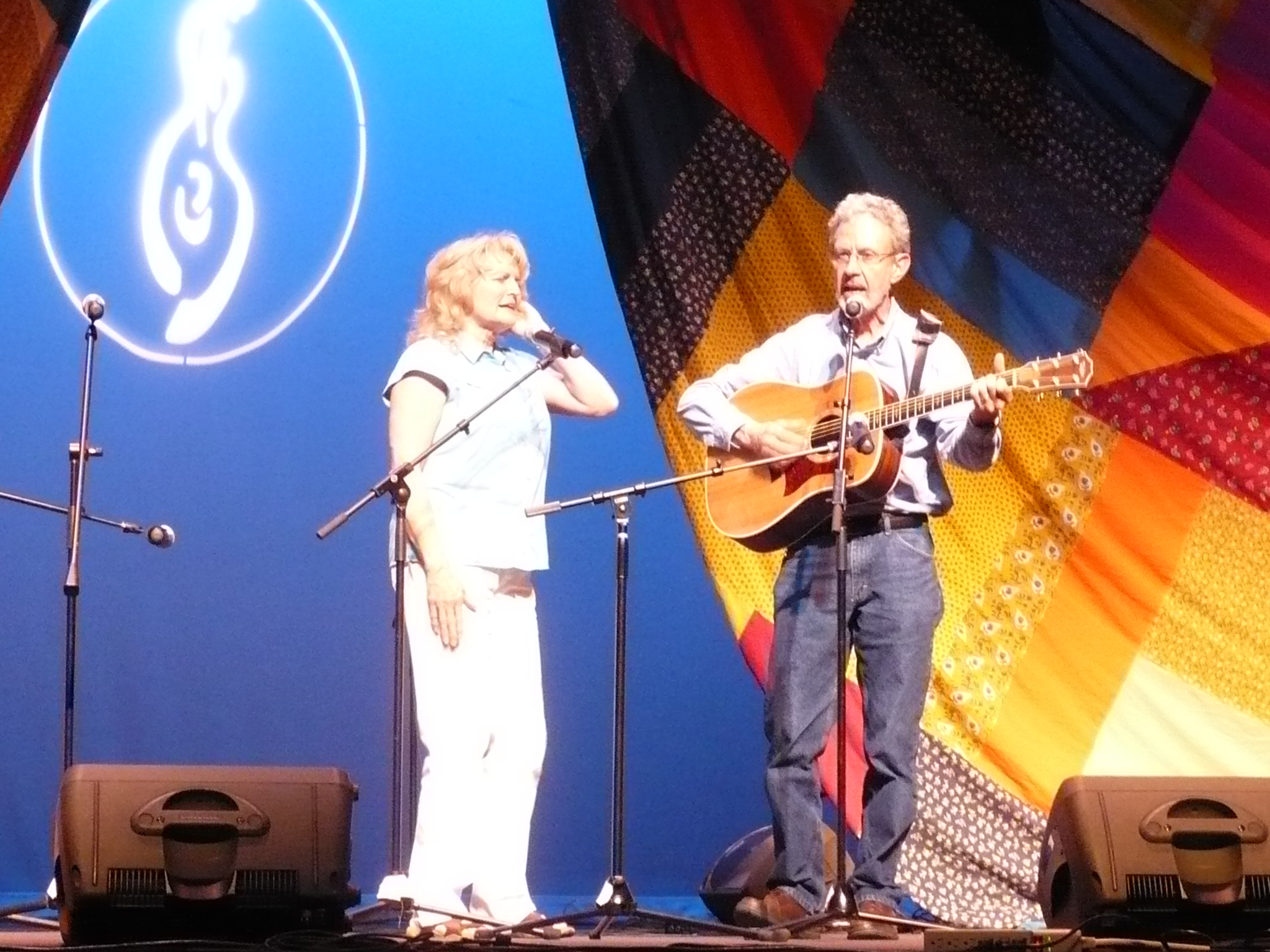
Tracy Schwarz (right) stood in on bass for the last few dates of the Stanley Brothers' European tour in March 1966.

In the spring of 1965, the Stanley brothers performed with existing fiddler Red Stanley and returning mandolinist Curley Lambert. In June, Carter, Ralph and Lambert recorded Bluegrass Gospel Favorites with Jack Cooke on guitar and Arthur "Sonny" Miller on fiddle. Later in the summer, George Shuffler returned and the trio recorded The Greatest Country & Western Show on Earth (later renamed A Collection of Original Gospel & Sacred Songs) in September. In December, they recorded for Rimrock Records with fiddler Ralph Mayo, releasing the songs on The Stanley Brothers Goes to Europe in 1966 and An Empty Mansion: In Memory of Carter Stanley in 1967.

In January 1966, Melvin Goins joined the CMB on bass. Due to passport issues, however, he was unable to perform on the band's European tour in February and March, with Chick Stripling taking his place initially; he was kicked off the tour in mid-March due to excessive drinking, with Tracy Schwarz taking over for the last few shows. Fiddle was performed by Don Miller, who was brought in last-minute after the band had failed to get in touch with planned stand-in Curly Ray Cline in time. The four-piece of the Stanleys, Shuffler and Goins continued to perform, playing the band's last shows at Bill Monroe's Brown County Jamboree in mid-October 1966.

On December 1, 1966, Carter Stanley died suddenly of liver failure at the age of 41 years. After a short break, Ralph Stanley formed a new lineup of the Clinch Mountain Boys in early 1967 with Larry Sparks taking over as lead vocalist, alongside Melvin Goins on lead guitar and Curly Ray Cline on fiddle.

== Members ==
=== Official ===
Image	Name (lifetime)	Years active	Instruments	Release contributions
	Carter Stanley (1925–1966)	1946–1966	guitar; lead and occasional baritone vocals	all Clinch Mountain Boys releases with the Stanley Brothers
	Ralph Stanley (1927–2016)	1946–1966	banjo; tenor, baritone and occasional lead vocals	all Clinch Mountain Boys releases with the Stanley Brothers
	Darrell "Pee Wee" Lambert (1924–1965)	1946–1951; 1952 (Note: Lambert also appeared as a session musician in 1957.)	mandolin; tenor, baritone and occasional lead vocals	all releases from "Mother No Longer Awaits Me at Home" (1947) to "The Lonesome River" (1951); "Fling Ding" (1957); "No School Bus in Heaven" (1958)^{B only}; On WYCB Bristol Farm & Fun Time (1988); Live Again! WYCB Bristol Farm & Fun Time (1988)
	Bobby Sumner (1924–1974)	1946–1947; 1949; 1951–1952	fiddle	"The White Dove" (1949); "Little Glass of Wine" (1949); "The Angels Are Singing" (1949); "A Vision of Mother" (1949); Live Again! WYCB Bristol Farm & Fun Time (1988)
	Leslie Keith (1906–1977)	1947–1948	fiddle; occasional vocals	"Mother No Longer Awaits Me at Home" (1947); "The Little Glass of Wine" (1948); "Our Darling's Gone" (1949); "Death Is Only a Dream" (1950); On WYCB Bristol Farm & Fun Time (1988)
	Ray "Pickles" Lambert (1924–unknown)	1947 (Note: It is unclear whether Lambert left in late 1947 or early 1948; he was absent by the time of the band's second recording session, which took place at an unknown time during this period.)	string bass; bass vocals	"Mother No Longer Awaits Me at Home" (1947); "Death Is Only a Dream" (1950); On WYCB Bristol Farm & Fun Time (1988)
	Art Wooten (1906–1986)	1948–1949 (Note: Wooten also appeared as a session musician in 1952.)	fiddle	"Molly and Tenbrook" (1948); "Sweetest Love" (1952); The Stanley Brothers (1961)
	Jay Hughes (1923–unknown)	1949–1950	string bass; bass vocals	"The White Dove" (1949); "Little Glass of Wine" (1949); "The Angels Are Singing" (1949); "A Vision of Mother" (1949); Live Again! WYCB Bristol Farm & Fun Time (1988)
	Lester Woodie (1931–2018)	1949–1951	fiddle	"The Old Home" (1950); "I Love No One but You" (1950); "We'll Be Sweethearts in Heaven" (1950); "Hey! Hey! Hey!" (1950); "The Lonesome River" (1951)
	John Shuffler (1931–2012)	1951; 1953	string bass; tenor vocals	"I Long to See the Old Folks" (1954); "Poison Lies" (1954)
	Charlie Cline (1931–2004)	1951–1952 (Note: Cline also appeared as a session musician in 1954.)	string bass (1951–1952); guitar (1954)	"Blue Moon of Kentucky" (1954)^{A only}; "Calling from Heaven" (1954); "Hard Times" (1955)^{A only}
	Bobby Osborne (1931–2023)	1951	mandolin; baritone vocals	none
	John "Curly" Seckler (1919–2017)	1951–1952	mandolin; tenor vocals	none
	George Shuffler (1925–2014)	1952–1966 (Note: Shuffler was not a constant member of the band from 1952 to 1966, but made regular appearances as both an official member and a session/live stand-in at numerous points during this period.)	string bass; mandolin (1957); guitar (from 1960); baritone, bass and occasional lead vocals	"Sweetest Love" (1952); "This Weary Heart You Stole Away" (1953); "(Say) Won't You Be Mine" (1953); "The Flood" (1957)^{A only}; "Fling Ding" (1957); "No School Bus in Heaven" (1958)^{B only}; Hymns and Sacred Songs (1959); Everybody's Country Favorites (1960); For the Good People (1960); The Stanley Brothers (1961); Sing the Songs They Like Best (1961); The Stanley's in Person (1961); Folk Song Festival (1962); Good Old Camp Meeting Songs (1962); The Mountain Music Sound (1962); all releases from The Country Folk Music Spotlight (1963) to Shadows of the Past (1981), except Bluegrass Gospel Favorites (1967); Stanley Series, Vol. 1 Nos. 1 (1982) and 4 (1984), Vol. 2 Nos. 2 (1984) and 4 (1987), and Vol. 3 Nos. 1 (1987) and 2 (1989); On Radio, Vols. 1 and 2 (1984); Clinch Mountain Bluegrass (1990); Radio Series, Vols. 1, 2 (1998), 3, 4 (2000), 5, 6 and 7 (2005); Plum Pitiful, Vols. One and Two (2000); Freight Trains Ride Again, Volume Two (2000); Riding That New River Train (2001); Pete Seeger's Rainbow Quest (2005); American Folk & Country Music Festival (2007)
	Art Stamper (1933–2005)	1952–1953; 1955–1956 (Note: Stamper also appeared as a session member in 1961 and 1964.)	fiddle	"Little Girl and the Dreadful Snake" (1952); "Little Glass of Wine" (1952); "This Weary Heart You Stole Away" (1953); "(Say) Won't You Be Mine" (1953); "Nobody's Love Is Like Mine" (1956)^{B only}; Country Pickin' and Singin' (1958); Sing the Songs They Like Best (1961); Folk Song Festival (1962); Bluegrass Songs for You (1964)
	"Big" Jim Williams (1932–2012)	1952–1954; 1955	mandolin; baritone and occasional lead vocals	all releases from "Little Girl and the Dreadful Snake" (1952) to "Blue Moon of Kentucky" (1954)^{B only}...; "So Blue" (1955); "Lonesome and Blue" (1955); "I Hear My Savior Calling" (1955); Country Pickin' and Singin' (1958); "Nobody's Love Is Like Mine" (1956)^{A only}; Stanley Series, Vol. 1 No. 3 (1982)
	Don "Chubby" Anthony (1935–1980)	1953; 1956–1957; 1958–1960; 1961	fiddle; bass, baritone and tenor vocals	"The Flood" (1957); "The Cry from the Cross" (1957); "Fling Ding" (1957); "No School Bus in Heaven" (1958)^{B only}; Country Pickin' and Singin' (1958); Mountain Song Favorites (1959); Hymns and Sacred Songs (1959); The Stanley's in Person (1961); Folk Song Festival (1962); Bluegrass Songs for You (1964); Recorded Live, Volume 2 (1970); Shadows of the Past (1981); Stanley Series, Vol. 2 No. 1 (1984), Vol. 2 No. 3 (1986), Vol. 3 No. 1 (1987), Vol. 4 No. 1 (1996); On Radio, Vols. 1 and 2 (1984); Clinch Mountain Bluegrass (1990); Riding That New River Train (2001); Valley View Park 1957 (2017)
	Ralph Mayo (1930–1992)	1953–1965 (Note: Mayo was not a constant member of the band from 1953 to 1965, but made regular appearances as both an official member and a session/live stand-in at numerous points during this period.)	fiddle; occasional guitar; bass and baritone vocals	"I Long to See the Old Folks" (1954); "Poison Lies" (1954); "The Flood" (1957)^{B only}; "The Cry from the Cross" (1957); "No School Bus in Heaven" (1958)^{A only}; Country Pickin' and Singin' (1958); Stanley Brothers and the Clinch Mountain Boys (1959); "Christmas Is Near" (1959)^{V/A}; Everybody's Country Favorites (1960); For the Good People (1960); Sacred Songs from the Hills (1960); Good Old Camp Meeting Songs (1962); The Mountain Music Sound (1962); Folk Concert (1963); The Country Folk Music Spotlight (1963); America's Finest 5-String Banjo Hootenanny (1964); Bluegrass Songs for You (1964); The Stanley Brothers Goes to Europe (1966); An Empty Mansion: In Memory of Carter Stanley (1967); Live at Antioch College, 1960 (1981); Stanley Series, Vol. 1 No. 2 (1982) and Vol. 3 No. 3 (1990); On Radio, Vols. 1 and 2 (1984); Old-Time Songs (2001); Brown County Jamboree (2004)
	Ralph "Joe" Meadows (1931–2003)	1953–1955 (Note: It is not known whether Meadows joined the band in 1953 or 1954; according to historian Gary B. Reid, he replaced Chubby Anthony in "late 1953 or early 1954" (before the session in May).) (Note: Meadows also appeared as a session member in 1958.)	fiddle; baritone and bass vocals	"Memories of Mother" (1954); all releases from "Blue Moon of Kentucky" (1954) to "Baby Girl" (1956); "Gonna Paint the Town" (1958); Country Pickin' and Singin' (1958); "Holiday Pickin'" (1958)
	Bill Lowe (1930–1988)	1954–1955 (Note: Lowe also appeared as a session member later in 1955.)	mandolin; string bass; baritone and bass vocals	all releases from "Blue Moon of Kentucky" (1954)^{A only} to "Baby Girl" (1956); Country Pickin' and Singin' (1958)
	Doug Morris (1934–unknown)	1955; 1956	string bass; occasional vocals	"The Flood" (1957)^{B only}; "The Cry from the Cross" (1957); Country Pickin' and Singin' (1958); Stanley Series, Vol. 1 No. 3 and Vol. 2 No. 1 (1984)
	Richard "Curley" Lambert (1930–1982)	1955–1957; 1960–1961; 1962–1963; 1965	mandolin; occasional guitar; baritone, tenor and occasional lead vocals	"Nobody's Love Is Like Mine" (1956)^{B only}; "The Flood" (1957)^{B only}; "The Cry from the Cross" (1957); Country Pickin' and Singin' (1958); "Christmas Is Near" (1959)^{V/A}; Sacred Songs from the Hills (1960); Sing the Songs They Like Best (1961); The Stanley's in Person (1961); Folk Song Festival (1962); Old Time Camp Meeting (1962); The Mountain Music Sound (1962); Folk Concert (1963); Bluegrass Songs for You (1964); Bluegrass Gospel Favorites (1967); Recorded Live (1970); Recorded Live, Volume 2 (1970); Shadows of the Past (1981); Live at Antioch College, 1960 (1981); Stanley Series, Vol. 1 No. 2 (1982), Vol. 2 No. 1 (1984), Vol. 2 No. 3 (1986), Vol. 2 No. 4, Vol. 3 No. 1 (1987), Vol. 3 No. 2 (1989) and Vol. 4 No. 1 (1996); Old-Time Songs (2001); Folk Festival (2001); Brown County Jamboree (2004); Friends of Old Time Music (2006); Valley View Park 1957 (2017)
	Lindy Clear (1930–1971)	1956; 1957; 1959; 1960	string bass; occasional vocals	Recorded Live, Volume 2 (1970); Shadows of the Past (1981); Live at Antioch College, 1960 (1981); Stanley Series, Vol. 1 No. 2 (1982), Vol. 2 No. 3 (1986) and Vol. 4 No. 1 (1996); Clinch Mountain Bluegrass (1990); Brown County Jamboree (2004); Valley View Park 1957 (2017)
	Vernon "Jack" Cooke (1936–2009)	1957–1958 (Note: Cooke also appeared as a stand-in or session musician in 1961, 1963, 1964 and 1965.)	string bass; guitar; occasional vocals	Hymns of the Cross (1964); Bluegrass Gospel Favorites (1967); Shadows of the Past (1981); Stanley Series, Vol. 1 No. 1 (1982), Vol. 2 No. 2 (1984), Vol. 3 No. 3 (1990); Riding That New River Train (2001); Valley View Park 1957 (2017)
	Frank Wakefield (1934–2024)	1957	mandolin; baritone vocals	none
	Bill Napier (1935–2000)	1957–1958; 1959–1960	mandolin; guitar; baritone and occasional lead vocals	"No School Bus in Heaven" (1958)^{A only}; "Gonna Paint the Town" (1958); "Holiday Pickin'" (1958); Stanley Brothers and the Clinch Mountain Boys (1959); Mountain Song Favorites (1959); Everybody's Country Favorites (1960); For the Good People (1960); Sacred Songs from the Hills (1960); Shadows of the Past (1981); On Radio, Vols. 1 and 2 (1984); Stanley Series, Vol. 3 No. 3 (1990) and Vol. 3 No. 4 (1992); Clinch Mountain Bluegrass (1990); Valley View Park 1957 (2017)
	Al Elliott (1934–2013)	1958–1959; 1961	string bass; mandolin (early 1959); baritone, tenor and occasional lead vocals	"Gonna Paint the Town" (1958); "Holiday Pickin'" (1958); Stanley Brothers and the Clinch Mountain Boys (1959); Mountain Song Favorites (1959); Hymns and Sacred Songs (1959); The Stanley's in Person (1961); Folk Song Festival (1962); Bluegrass Songs for You (1964); Recorded Live, Volume 2 (1970); Stanley Series, Vol. 3 No. 4 (1992)
	Benny Williams (1931–2007)	1958	fiddle	none
	Paul "Moon" Mullins (1936–2008)	1958–1959	fiddle (Sep–Dec 1958); string bass (Dec 1958–Jan 1959)	none
	Johnnie Bonds (1915–2003)	1959–1960	string bass	none
	Vernon Derrick (1933–2008)	1960–1961; 1962–1963	fiddle; bass vocals	The Stanley's in Person (1961); Old Time Camp Meeting (1962); Folk Concert (1963); Recorded Live (1970); Recorded Live, Volume 2 (1970); Stanley Series, Vol. 2 No. 4 (1987) and Vol. 3 No. 2 (1989); Folk Festival (2001); Friends of Old Time Music (2006)
	James "Chick" Stripling (1916–1970)	1961–1962 (Note: Stripling also appeared as a session musician in 1964 and a stand-in musician in 1966.)	string bass; occasional vocals	The Stanley's in Person (1961); Folk Song Festival (1962); Old Time Camp Meeting (1962); Good Old Camp Meeting Songs (1962); The Country Folk Music Spotlight (1963); Hymns of the Cross (1964); Bluegrass Songs for You (1964); Recorded Live (1970); The Audience Pleased (1975)^{V/A}; Shadows of the Past (1981); Folk Festival (2001); Pete Seeger's Rainbow Quest (2005); American Folk & Country Music Festival (2007)
	Henry Dockery (c. 1937–1990)	1963–1964	string bass; baritone and occasional lead vocals	The Country Folk Music Spotlight (1963); America's Finest 5-String Banjo Hootenanny (1964); On the Air (1976); Radio Series, Vols. 1, 2 (1998), 3, 4 (2000), 5, 6 and 7 (2005); Plum Pitiful, Vols. One and Two (2000); Freight Trains Ride Again, Volume Two (2000)
	Harold "Red" Stanley (1922–1987)	1964–1965	fiddle	Clinch Mountain Bluegrass (1990)|Folk Festival (2001)|
	Larry Sparks	1964–1965	guitar; baritone vocals	Folk Festival (2001)
	Melvin Goins (1933–2016)	1966	string bass	Together for the Last Time (1971); Stanley Series, Vol. 1 No. 4 (1984)

=== Stand-in ===
Image	Name (lifetime)	Years active	Instruments	Details
	Pete Kuykendall (1938–2017)	1958	fiddle	Kuykendall performed at one show in September 1958 recorded for Stanley Series, Vol. 3 No. 4 (1992).
	Mike Seeger (1933–2009)	1961	string bass	Seeger, who was recording the show, made a guest appearance on bass at a performance in February 1961.
	Tom Gray	1961	string bass	As the band was still without a regular bassist, Gray stood in for a show on May 27, 1961.
	Birch Monroe (1901–1982)	1962; 1966	bass vocals	Monroe joined the band for vocal quartet performances in March 1962 and October 1966.
	Roger Bush	1962	string bass	Following Chick Stripling's departure, Bush filled in on bass for shows in August and September 1962.
	Carl Chatzky (aka. Carl Hawkins) (1938–2014)	1962	string bass	Chatzky stood in on bass for one show in New York City on November 30, 1962.
	Benny Birchfield (1937–2025)	1964	string bass	Birchfield, then a member of the Osborne Brothers' band, filled in at various shows in the summer of 1964.
	Ray Tate	1965	string bass	Tate filled in on bass during early 1965, featuring on the 2001 live release Folk Festival.
	Don Miller	1966	fiddle	Miller played fiddle at the band's European tour and television recordings in February and March 1966.
	Tracy Schwarz (1938–2025)	1966	string bass	Schwarz took over from fellow stand-in Chick Stripling on the band's European tour in March 1966.

=== Session ===
Image	Name (lifetime)	Years active	Instruments	Release contributions
	Ernie Newton (1909–1976)	1949–1950	string bass	"The Old Home" (1950); "I Love No One but You" (1950); "We'll Be Sweethearts in Heaven" (1950); "Hey! Hey! Hey!" (1950); "The Lonesome River" (1951)
	Floyd "Lightnin'" Chance (1925–2005)	1954	string bass	"Memories of Mother" (1954); "Blue Moon of Kentucky" (1954); "Calling from Heaven" (1954); "Hard Times" (1955); "Nobody's Love Is Like Mine" (1956)^{A only}; "Baby Girl" (1956); Country Pickin' and Singin' (1958)
	Mervin "Red" Malone (1929–1993)	1957	string bass	"The Flood" (1957)^{A only}
	Benny Martin (1928–2001)	1957	fiddle	1953–58 & 1959 (1993)
	Howdy Forrester (1922–1987)	1957	fiddle	1953–58 & 1959 (1993)
	"Little" Roy Wiggins (1926–1999)	1957	steel guitar	1953–58 & 1959 (1993)
	Curly King (real name Cecil Crusenberry) (1921–1989)	1958	string bass	"No School Bus in Heaven" (1958)^{A only}
	Lowell "Gene" Meadows (1932–2008)	1958	guitar	"Gonna Paint the Town" (1958); "Holiday Pickin'" (1958)
	Bill Slaughter	1960	string bass	Sacred Songs from the Hills (1960)
	James "Audie" Webster (1935–1982)	1960	string bass	Sacred Songs from the Hills (1960); The Mountain Music Sound (1962)
	Gene Redd	1960	drums	The Stanley's in Person (1961)
	Earl Taylor (1929–1984)	1964	mandolin; harmonica	Hymns of the Cross (1964); Bluegrass Songs for You (1964)
	Vernon McIntyre	1964	string bass	Bluegrass Songs for You (1964)
	Barry Glickman	1964	string bass	none (Note: This lineup did not release anything under the Clinch Mountain Boys name, but did record Songs of Mother and Home and John's Gospel Quartet under the alias "John's Gospel Quartet".)
	Arthur "Sonny" Miller (1932–1981)	1965	fiddle	Bluegrass Gospel Favorites (1967)
	Wayne Raney (1921–1993)	1965	harmonica	An Empty Mansion: In Memory of Carter Stanley (1967)

== Lineups ==
Period	Members	Recordings
November 1946–early 1947	Carter Stanley — guitar, lead vocals; Ralph Stanley — banjo, baritone vocals; Pee Wee Lambert — mandolin, tenor vocals; Bobby Sumner — fiddle	none
Early–late 1947/early 1948	Carter Stanley — guitar, lead vocals; Ralph Stanley — banjo, baritone vocals; Pee Wee Lambert — mandolin, tenor vocals; Leslie Keith — fiddle; Ray Lambert — string bass, bass vocals	"Mother No Longer Awaits Me at Home" (1947)^{A&B}; "Death Is Only a Dream" (1950)^{A&B}; On WYCB Bristol Farm & Fun Time (1988)
Late 1947/early 1948	Carter Stanley — guitar, lead vocals; Ralph Stanley — banjo, baritone vocals; Pee Wee Lambert — mandolin, tenor vocals; Leslie Keith — fiddle	"The Little Glass of Wine" (1948)^{A&B}; "Our Darling's Gone" (1949)^{A&B}
Early/mid 1948–January 1949	Carter Stanley — guitar, lead vocals; Ralph Stanley — banjo, baritone vocals; Pee Wee Lambert — mandolin, tenor vocals; Art Wooten — fiddle	"Molly and Tenbrook" (1948)^{A&B}
January–June 1949	Carter Stanley — guitar, lead vocals; Ralph Stanley — banjo, tenor vocals; Pee Wee Lambert — mandolin, baritone vocals; Bobby Sumner — fiddle; Jay Hughes — string bass, bass vocals	"The White Dove" (1949)^{A&B}; "Little Glass of Wine" (1949)^{A&B}; "The Angels Are Singing" (1949)^{A&B}; "A Vision of Mother" (1949)^{A&B}; Live Again! WYCB Bristol Farm & Fun Time (1988)
June 1949–January 1950	Carter Stanley — guitar, lead vocals; Ralph Stanley — banjo, tenor vocals; Pee Wee Lambert — mandolin, baritone vocals; Lester Woodie — fiddle; Jay Hughes — string bass, bass vocals (Note: Hughes did not perform at the band's only recording session during this period, their second for Columbia on November 24, 1949; he was replaced by session musician Ernie Newton.)	"The Old Home" (1950)^{A&B}; "I Love No One but You" (1950)^{A&B}; "We'll Be Sweethearts in Heaven" (1950)^{A&B}
Band on hiatus January–July 1950
July 1950–February 1951	Carter Stanley — guitar, lead vocals; Ralph Stanley — banjo, tenor vocals; Pee Wee Lambert — mandolin, baritone vocals; Lester Woodie — fiddle; Ernie Newton — string bass (session)	"Hey! Hey! Hey!" (1950)^{A&B}; "The Lonesome River" (1951)^{A&B}
February–June 1951	Carter Stanley — guitar, lead vocals; Ralph Stanley — banjo, tenor vocals; Pee Wee Lambert — mandolin, baritone vocals; Lester Woodie — fiddle; John Shuffler — string bass	none
Band on hiatus June–October 1951
October–December 1951	Carter Stanley — guitar, lead vocals; Ralph Stanley — banjo, tenor vocals; Bobby Osborne — mandolin, baritone vocals; Bobby Sumner — fiddle; Charlie Cline — string bass	none
December 1951–January 1952	Carter Stanley — guitar, lead vocals; Ralph Stanley — banjo, baritone vocals; Curly Seckler — mandolin, tenor vocals; Bobby Sumner — fiddle; Charlie Cline — string bass	none
January–March/April 1952 (Note: It is not known specifically how long Lambert and Sumner remained in the band; they were members in the new year, but had left by the time of the next recording session on April 11, 1952.)	Carter Stanley — guitar, lead vocals; Ralph Stanley — banjo, tenor vocals; Pee Wee Lambert — mandolin, baritone vocals; Bobby Sumner — fiddle; George Shuffler — string bass	none
April 1952 (temporary recording lineup)	Carter Stanley — guitar, lead vocals; Ralph Stanley — banjo, tenor vocals; George Shuffler — string bass, baritone vocals; Art Wooten — fiddle (session)	"Sweetest Love" (1952)^{A&B}; The Stanley Brothers (1961)^{comp}; The Columbia Sessions, 1949–1950, Volume Two (1982)^{comp}
April–May 1952	Carter Stanley — guitar, lead vocals; Ralph Stanley — banjo, tenor vocals; Art Stamper — fiddle; George Shuffler — string bass, baritone vocals	none
May–late 1952	Carter Stanley — guitar, lead vocals; Ralph Stanley — banjo, tenor vocals; Jim Williams — mandolin, baritone vocals; Art Stamper — fiddle; George Shuffler — string bass	"Little Girl and the Dreadful Snake" (1952)^{A&B}; "Little Glass of Wine" (1952)^{A&B}
Band on hiatus late 1952–spring 1953
Spring–September 1953	Carter Stanley — guitar, lead vocals; Ralph Stanley — banjo, tenor vocals; Jim Williams — mandolin, baritone vocals; Art Stamper — fiddle; George Shuffler — string bass (session)	"This Weary Heart You Stole Away" (1953)^{A&B}; "(Say) Won't You Be Mine" (1953)^{A&B}
September–November 1953	Carter Stanley — guitar, lead vocals; Ralph Stanley — banjo, tenor vocals; Jim Williams — mandolin, baritone vocals; John Shuffler — string bass	none
November–December 1953	Carter Stanley — guitar, lead vocals; Ralph Stanley — banjo, tenor vocals; Jim Williams — mandolin, baritone vocals; Chubby Anthony — fiddle, bass vocals (Note: Anthony did not perform at the band's only recording session during this period, their second for Mercury on November 25, 1953; he was replaced by session musician Ralph Mayo.); John Shuffler — string bass	"I Long to See the Old Folks" (1954)^{A&B}; "Poison Lies" (1954)^{A&B}
Late 1953/early 1954–summer 1954	Carter Stanley — guitar, lead vocals; Ralph Stanley — banjo, tenor vocals; Jim Williams — mandolin, baritone vocals; Joe Meadows — fiddle, bass vocals; Floyd Chance — string bass (session)	"Memories of Mother" (1954)^{A&B}; "I Just Got Wise" (1954)^{B-side}; "Nobody's Love Is Like Mine" (1956)^{A only}
Summer 1954–early 1955	Carter Stanley — guitar, lead vocals; Ralph Stanley — banjo, tenor vocals; Bill Lowe — mandolin, baritone vocals; Joe Meadows — fiddle, bass vocals; Floyd Chance — string bass (session); Charlie Cline — guitar (session, August 1954)	"Blue Moon of Kentucky" (1954)^{A only}; "Calling from Heaven" (1954)^{A&B}; "Hard Times" (1955)^{A&B}; "Baby Girl" (1956)^{A&B}; Country Pickin' and Singin' (1958)^{comp}; 1953–58 & 1959 (1993)^{comp}
Early–spring 1955	Carter Stanley — guitar, lead vocals; Ralph Stanley — banjo, tenor vocals; Jim Williams — mandolin, baritone vocals; Joe Meadows — fiddle; Bill Lowe — string bass, bass vocals	"So Blue" (1955)^{A&B}; "Lonesome and Blue" (1955)^{A&B}; "I Hear My Savior Calling" (1955)^{A&B}; Country Pickin' and Singin' (1958)^{comp}
Spring–summer 1955	Carter Stanley — guitar, lead vocals; Ralph Stanley — banjo, tenor vocals; Jim Williams — mandolin, baritone vocals; Doug Morris — string bass	Stanley Series, Vol. 1 No. 3 (1982)
Summer–fall 1955	Carter Stanley — guitar, lead vocals; Ralph Stanley — banjo, tenor vocals; Jim Williams — mandolin, baritone vocals; Ralph Mayo — fiddle, bass vocals; George Shuffler — string bass	The Definitive Collection (1947–1966) (2007)^{comp}
October 1955–January 1956	Carter Stanley — guitar, lead vocals; Ralph Stanley — banjo, tenor vocals; Curley Lambert — mandolin, baritone vocals; Art Stamper — fiddle; Bill Lowe — string bass, bass vocals (session)	"Big Tilda" (1956)^{B-side}; Country Pickin' and Singin' (1958)^{comp}; 1953–58 & 1959 (1993)^{comp}
Early–spring 1956	Carter Stanley — guitar, lead vocals; Ralph Stanley — banjo, tenor vocals; Curley Lambert — mandolin, baritone vocals; Ralph Mayo — fiddle, bass vocals	Old-Time Songs (2001)
Spring–summer 1956	Carter Stanley — guitar, lead vocals; Ralph Stanley — banjo, tenor vocals; Curley Lambert — mandolin, baritone vocals; Chubby Anthony — fiddle, bass vocals; Doug Morris — string bass	Stanley Series, Vol. 2 No. 1 (1984)
Summer 1956	Carter Stanley — guitar, lead vocals; Ralph Stanley — banjo, tenor vocals; Curley Lambert — mandolin, baritone vocals; Chubby Anthony — fiddle, bass vocals; Lindy Clear — string bass (Note: Clear did not perform at the band's only recording session during this period, on July 16, 1956. Bass was instead performed by Doug Morris.); Ralph Mayo — fiddle (session)	"I'm Lost, I'll Never Find the Way" (1956)^{B-side}; "The Cry from the Cross" (1957)^{A&B}; Country Pickin' and Singin' (1958)^{comp}; Stanley Series, Vol. 2 No. 3 (1986); 1953–58 & 1959 (1993)^{comp}; Stanley Series, Vol. 4 No. 1 (1996)
Summer–fall 1956	Carter Stanley — guitar, lead vocals; Ralph Stanley — banjo, tenor vocals; Curley Lambert — mandolin, baritone vocals; Chubby Anthony — fiddle, bass vocals; George Shuffler — string bass	Stanley Series, Vol. 3 No. 1 (1987)
January/February 1957 (temporary recording lineup)	Carter Stanley — guitar, lead vocals; Ralph Stanley — banjo, tenor vocals; George Shuffler — mandolin; Chubby Anthony — fiddle, bass vocals; Red Malone — string bass (session)	"The Flood" (1957)^{A only}
February 1957 (temporary recording lineup)	Carter Stanley — guitar, lead vocals; Ralph Stanley — banjo, tenor vocals; Chubby Anthony — fiddle, bass vocals; George Shuffler — string bass, baritone vocals; Pee Wee Lambert — mandolin (session)	"Fling Ding" (1957)^{A&B}; "I'll Never Grow Tired of You" (1958)^{B-side}
April–May 1957	Carter Stanley — guitar, lead vocals; Ralph Stanley — banjo, tenor vocals; Curley Lambert — mandolin, baritone vocals; Chubby Anthony — fiddle, bass vocals; Lindy Clear — string bass	Shadows of the Past (1981)^{comp}; Valley View Park 1957 (2017)
Mid–late May 1957	Carter Stanley — guitar, lead vocals; Ralph Stanley — banjo, tenor vocals; Frank Wakefield — mandolin, baritone vocals; Chubby Anthony — fiddle, bass vocals; Jack Cooke — string bass	none
Early–mid June 1957	Carter Stanley — guitar, lead vocals; Ralph Stanley — banjo, tenor vocals; Chubby Anthony — fiddle, bass vocals; Jack Cooke — string bass, baritone vocals	Shadows of the Past (1981)^{comp}
Mid June 1957–early 1958	Carter Stanley — guitar, lead vocals; Ralph Stanley — banjo, tenor vocals; Bill Napier — mandolin, baritone vocals; Jack Cooke — string bass; Benny Martin — fiddle (session); Howdy Forrester — fiddle (session); Roy Wiggins — steel guitar (session)	Shadows of the Past (1981)^{comp}; Valley View Park 1957 (2017)
Early–summer 1958	Carter Stanley — guitar, lead vocals; Ralph Stanley — banjo, tenor vocals; Bill Napier — mandolin, baritone vocals; Ralph Mayo — fiddle, bass vocals; Jack Cooke — string bass (Note: Cooke did not perform at the band's session in March 1958 at which they recorded "No School Bus in Heaven". Bass was instead performed by Curly King.)	"No School Bus in Heaven" (1958)^{A only}; Stanley Series, Vol. 3 No. 3 (1990)
Summer 1958	Carter Stanley — guitar, lead vocals; Ralph Stanley — banjo, tenor vocals; Bill Napier — mandolin, baritone vocals; Benny Williams — fiddle (Note: Williams did not perform at the band's only recording session during this period, in August 1958. Fiddle was instead performed by Joe Meadows.); Al Elliott — string bass, baritone vocals; Gene Meadows — guitar (session)	"Gonna Paint the Town" (1958)^{A&B}; "Holiday Pickin'" (1958)^{A&B}
September 1958 (one-off live lineup)	Carter Stanley — guitar, lead vocals; Ralph Stanley — banjo, tenor vocals; Bill Napier — mandolin, baritone vocals; Al Elliott — string bass, baritone vocals; Pete Kuykendall — fiddle (stand-in)	Stanley Series, Vol. 3 No. 4 (1992)
September–December 1958	Carter Stanley — guitar, lead vocals; Ralph Stanley — banjo, tenor vocals; Bill Napier — mandolin, baritone vocals; Paul Mullins — fiddle (Note: Mullins did not perform at either of the band's recording sessions during this period, on September 30 and October 1, 1958. Fiddle was instead performed by Ralph Mayo.); Al Elliott — string bass, baritone vocals	Stanley Brothers and the Clinch Mountain Boys (1959)
December 1958–January 1959	Carter Stanley — guitar, lead vocals; Ralph Stanley — banjo, tenor vocals; Al Elliott — mandolin, baritone vocals; Chubby Anthony — fiddle, tenor vocals; Paul Mullins — string bass	none
February 1959 (temporary recording lineup)	Carter Stanley — guitar, lead vocals; Ralph Stanley — banjo, tenor vocals; Al Elliott — mandolin, baritone vocals; Chubby Anthony — fiddle, tenor vocals; George Shuffler — string bass (session)	Hymns and Sacred Songs (1959); The Stanley's in Person (1961)^{1 song}
March–May 1959	Carter Stanley — guitar, lead vocals; Ralph Stanley — banjo, tenor vocals; Bill Napier — mandolin, baritone vocals; Chubby Anthony — fiddle, tenor vocals; Al Elliott — string bass, baritone vocals	Mountain Song Favorites (1959)^{4 songs}
May–July 1959	Carter Stanley — guitar, lead vocals; Ralph Stanley — banjo, tenor vocals; Bill Napier — mandolin, baritone vocals; Chubby Anthony — fiddle, tenor vocals; Lindy Clear — string bass	Clinch Mountain Bluegrass (1990)
July 1959–early 1960	Carter Stanley — guitar, lead vocals; Ralph Stanley — banjo, tenor vocals; Bill Napier — mandolin, baritone vocals; Chubby Anthony — fiddle, tenor vocals; Johnnie Bonds — string bass (Note: Bonds did not perform at the band's sessions in September 1959 at which they recorded Everybody's Country Favorites and For the Good People. Bass was instead performed by George Shuffler.)	Mountain Song Favorites (1959)^{4 songs}; Everybody's Country Favorites (1960); For the Good People (1960)
Early 1960 (temporary recording lineup)	Carter Stanley — guitar, lead vocals; Ralph Stanley — banjo, tenor vocals; Bill Napier — guitar, baritone vocals; Ralph Mayo — fiddle, bass vocals (session); Bill Slaughter — string bass (session)	Sacred Songs from the Hills (1960)^{4 songs}
Early–spring 1960	Carter Stanley — guitar, lead vocals; Ralph Stanley — banjo, tenor vocals; Bill Napier — guitar, baritone vocals; Chubby Anthony — fiddle, tenor vocals; George Shuffler — string bass (stand-in)	On Radio, Volume One (1983); On Radio, Volume Two (1984)
Spring–summer 1960	Carter Stanley — guitar, lead vocals; Ralph Stanley — banjo, tenor vocals; Curley Lambert — mandolin, baritone vocals; Ralph Mayo — fiddle, bass vocals; Lindy Clear — string bass	Live at Antioch College, 1960 (1981); Stanley Series, Vol. 1 No. 2 (1982); Brown County Jamboree (2004)
June 1960 (temporary recording lineup)	Carter Stanley — guitar, lead vocals; Ralph Stanley — banjo, tenor vocals; Curley Lambert — mandolin, guitar, vocals; Ralph Mayo — fiddle, guitar, vocals; Audie Webster — string bass (session)	"Christmas Is Near" (1959)^{V/A}; Sacred Songs from the Hills (1960)^{8 songs}; The Mountain Music Sound (1962)^{4 songs}
July 1960–January 1961	Carter Stanley — guitar, lead vocals; Ralph Stanley — banjo, tenor vocals; Curley Lambert — mandolin, guitar, vocals; Vernon Derrick — fiddle, bass vocals (Note: Derrick did not perform at the band's sessions in January 1961 at which they recorded Sing the Songs They Like Best and the songs released on Bluegrass Songs for You, Folk Song Festival and The Early Starday/King Years, 1958–1961. Fiddle was instead performed by Art Stamper.); George Shuffler — string bass, vocals; Gene Redd — drums (session, July 1960)	The Stanley's in Person (1961)^{8 songs}; Sing the Songs They Like Best (1961); Folk Song Festival (1962)^{4 songs}; The Mountain Music Sound (1962)^{1 song}; Bluegrass Songs for You (1964)^{3 songs}; The Early Starday/King Years, 1958–1961 (1993)^{comp}
January–spring 1961	Carter Stanley — guitar, lead vocals; Ralph Stanley — banjo, tenor vocals; Curley Lambert — mandolin, baritone vocals; Vernon Derrick — fiddle, bass vocals; Chick Stripling — string bass; Mike Seeger — string bass (stand-in, one show)	The Stanley's in Person (1961)^{1 song}; Old Time Camp Meeting (1962); Folk Festival (2001)
Spring–summer 1961	Carter Stanley — guitar, lead vocals; Ralph Stanley — banjo, tenor vocals; George Shuffler — guitar, baritone vocals; Chick Stripling — string bass (Note: Stripling did not perform with the band during this period. Bass was performed on Stanley Series, Vol. 1 No. 1 and Vol. 2 No. 2 by Jack Cooke, on Recorded Live, Volume 2 by an unknown musician, on the Bluegrass Songs for You tracks and Riding That New River Train by George Shuffler, and on the Folk Song Festival tracks by Shuffler and Chubby Anthony.); Jack Cooke — string bass (stand-in); Tom Gray — string bass (stand-in)	Stanley Series, Vol. 1 No. 1 (1982); Stanley Series, Vol. 2 No. 2 (1984)
June 1961	Carter Stanley — guitar, lead vocals; Ralph Stanley — banjo, tenor vocals; George Shuffler — guitar, baritone vocals; Al Elliott — mandolin, baritone vocals; Chick Stripling — string bass; Unknown musician — string bass (stand-in)	Recorded Live, Volume 2 (1970)^{4 songs}
July 1961	Carter Stanley — guitar, lead vocals; Ralph Stanley — banjo, tenor vocals; George Shuffler — guitar, baritone vocals; Al Elliott — mandolin, baritone vocals; Chubby Anthony — fiddle, tenor vocals; Chick Stripling — string bass	Folk Song Festival (1962)^{3 songs}; Bluegrass Songs for You (1964)^{1 song}
August–fall/late 1961	Carter Stanley — guitar, lead vocals; Ralph Stanley — banjo, tenor vocals; George Shuffler — guitar, baritone vocals; Chubby Anthony — fiddle, tenor vocals; Chick Stripling — string bass	Folk Song Festival (1962)^{4 songs}; Riding That New River Train (2001)
Fall/late 1961–summer 1962	Carter Stanley — guitar, lead vocals; Ralph Stanley — banjo, tenor vocals; George Shuffler — guitar, baritone vocals; Chick Stripling — string bass; Ralph Mayo — fiddle (session, May 1962)	Good Old Camp Meeting Songs (1962); "My Deceitful Heart" (1962)^{A&B}; The Country Folk Music Spotlight (1963)^{4 songs}; Bluegrass Songs for You (1964)^{1 song}; Recorded Live (1970)^{2 songs}; "How Mountain Girls Can Love" (1975)^{V/A}; Shadows of the Past (1981)^{comp}
Summer–fall 1962	Carter Stanley — guitar, lead vocals; Ralph Stanley — banjo, tenor vocals; George Shuffler — guitar, baritone vocals; Curley Lambert — mandolin, baritone vocals; Vernon Derrick — fiddle, bass vocals; Roger Bush — string bass (stand-in)	Recorded Live (1970)^{3 songs}; Recorded Live, Volume 2 (1970)^{1 songs}; Stanley Series, Vol. 2 No. 4 (1987); Stanley Series, Vol. 3 No. 2 (1989); The Definitive Collection (1947–1966) (2007)^{comp}
November 1962 (one-off live lineup)	Carter Stanley — guitar, lead vocals; Ralph Stanley — banjo, tenor vocals; Curley Lambert — mandolin, baritone vocals; Vernon Derrick — fiddle, bass vocals; Carl Chatzky — string bass (stand-in)	Friends of Old Time Music (2006)^{V/A}
Early–spring 1963	Carter Stanley — guitar, lead vocals; Ralph Stanley — banjo, tenor vocals; Curley Lambert — mandolin, guitar, baritone vocals; Vernon Derrick — string bass, bass vocals; Ralph Mayo — fiddle, guitar, vocals (session)	Folk Concert (1963)
Summer 1963–early 1964	Carter Stanley — guitar, lead vocals; Ralph Stanley — banjo, tenor vocals; George Shuffler — guitar, baritone vocals; Henry Dockery — string bass, baritone vocals; Ralph Mayo — fiddle, baritone vocals (session); Jack Cooke — guitar, vocals (guest, December 1963)	The Country Folk Music Spotlight (1963)^{8 songs}; America's Finest 5-String Banjo Hootenanny (1964); On the Air (1976); Radio Series, Vols. One and Two (1998); Radio Series, Vols. Three and Four (2000); Plum Pitiful, Volume One (2000)^{V/A}; Plum Pitiful, Volume Two (2000)^{V/A}; Freight Trains Ride Again, Volume Two (2000)^{V/A}; Radio Series, Vols. Five, Six and Seven (2005)
Spring–summer 1964	Carter Stanley — guitar, lead vocals; Ralph Stanley — banjo, tenor vocals; George Shuffler — guitar, baritone vocals; Earl Taylor — harmonica, harmonica (session); Chick Stripling — string bass (session, April); Art Stamper — fiddle (session, July); Vernon McIntyre — string bass (session, July)	Hymns of the Cross (1964); Bluegrass Songs for You (1964)
Summer–fall 1964	Carter Stanley — guitar, lead vocals; Ralph Stanley — banjo, tenor vocals; George Shuffler — guitar, baritone vocals; Red Stanley — fiddle; Benny Birchfield — string bass (stand-in)	Clinch Mountain Bluegrass (1990)
Fall/late 1964 (temporary recording lineup)	Carter Stanley — guitar, lead vocals; Ralph Stanley — banjo, tenor vocals; Red Stanley — fiddle; Jack Cooke — guitar, tenor vocals (stand-in); Barry Glickman — string bass (stand-in)	none
Late 1964–early/spring 1965	Carter Stanley — guitar, lead vocals; Ralph Stanley — banjo, tenor vocals; Larry Sparks — guitar, baritone vocals; Red Stanley — fiddle; Ray Tate — string bass (stand-in)	Folk Festival (2001)
Spring 1965	Carter Stanley — guitar, lead vocals; Ralph Stanley — banjo, tenor vocals; Curley Lambert — mandolin, baritone vocals; Red Stanley — fiddle	none
June 1965 (temporary recording lineup)	Carter Stanley — guitar, lead vocals; Ralph Stanley — banjo, tenor vocals; Curley Lambert — mandolin, baritone vocals; Jack Cooke — guitar, tenor vocals (session); Sonny Miller — fiddle (session)	Bluegrass Gospel Favorites (1967)
Summer 1965–January 1966	Carter Stanley — guitar, lead vocals; Ralph Stanley — banjo, tenor/lead vocals; George Shuffler — guitar, baritone vocals; Ralph Mayo — fiddle, vocals (session, December 1965)	The Greatest Country & Western Show on Earth (1966); The Stanley Brothers Goes to Europe (1966); An Empty Mansion: In Memory of Carter Stanley (1967)
January–October 1966	Carter Stanley — guitar, lead vocals; Ralph Stanley — banjo, tenor/lead vocals; George Shuffler — guitar, baritone vocals; Melvin Goins — string bass; Don Miller — fiddle (stand-in); Chick Stripling — string bass (stand-in, Feb.–March); Tracy Schwarz — string bass (stand-in, mid–late March); Birch Monroe — bass vocals (guest, October)	Together for the Last Time (1971); Stanley Series, Vol. 1 No. 4 (1984); Pete Seeger's Rainbow Quest (2005); American Folk & Country Music Festival (2007)

== Bibliography ==
- Reid, Gary B. (2014), The Music of the Stanley Brothers, Champaign, Illinois: University of Illinois Press, ISBN 978-0-252-09672-3
