= List of Clinch Mountain Boys members (1966–2016) =

Ralph Stanley (right) performing in 2011 with Clinch Mountain Boys members Dewey Brown (far left), James Alan Shelton (middle left) and Mitchell Van Dyke (middle right).

The Clinch Mountain Boys were the backing band for bluegrass banjo player Ralph Stanley from 1966 to 2016. Following the death of his brother Carter on December 1, 1966, Stanley revived the moniker with existing members George Shuffler on guitar and Melvin Goins on bass, plus Curly Ray Cline on fiddle and later Larry Sparks on lead vocals. The band went through numerous lineup changes during its tenure, with the final active lineup including Stanley's grandson Nathan on guitar and lead vocals, Hillard "Junior" Blankenship on lead guitar, Mitchell Van Dyke on banjo, Alex Hibbitts on mandolin, Dewey Brown on fiddle, and Randall Hibbitts on bass. Stanley's son, Ralph II, subsequently took over the Clinch Mountain Boys moniker for his own backing band.

== History ==
=== 1966–1970 ===
After 20 years as the backing band for the Stanley Brothers, the Clinch Mountain Boys (CMBs) were revived by banjo player Ralph Stanley around three weeks after the death of his brother, guitarist and lead vocalist Carter Stanley, on December 1, 1966. Retaining guitarist/vocalist George Shuffler and bassist Melvin Goins from the previous lineup, he added "Curly" Ray Cline on fiddle and performed for a few months on an ad-hoc basis. In February 1967, Stanley appointed former CMBs guitarist Larry Sparks as the band's new lead vocalist, at which point Shuffler chose to leave the group.

The new band recorded their first album, Brand New Country Songs for King Records, over the course of two sessions in May and October 1967, with Goins playing guitar and Jim McCall and Earl Taylor brought in as session bassist and mandolinist, respectively. In between these sessions, the group recorded Old Time Music for Jalyn Records in August, with label owner Jack Lynch performing bass and former CMBs member Richard "Curley" Lambert contributing mandolin. A second Jalyn release, The Bluegrass Sound, was recorded in February 1968, with the band (sans-Goins) and Lynch joined by Frank Wakefield on mandolin. The next week, the quartet recorded their second album for King, Over the Sunset Hill; former CMBs member George Shuffler was due to perform bass and vocals at the session, but was unavailable and Goins was forced to learn his vocal parts, with Shuffler overdubbing bass at a later date. In February 1969, the band recorded Cline's debut solo album, Curly Ray Cline and his Lonesome Pine Fiddle.

In May 1969, Goins left to reform the Goins Brothers Band. After one show with stand-in Barney Munger, Shuffler returned to take over on bass. Despite his return, Shuffler did not appear at the band's performances at Carlton Haney's bluegrass festival in early July, with Ed Ferris of the Country Gentlemen standing in (guitarist Lonnie Bowlin also made a guest appearance). Shuffler also didn't perform at the band's next sessions for King just over a week later, with McCall returning on bass and Jimmy Martin making a guest appearance on mandolin and guitar. For their performances at Haney's next festival from August 30 to September 1, the band was joined by Cullen Galyean on mandolin, while Benny Jarrell filled in on bass for the first show. Shuffler returned for the second and third shows.

=== 1969–1986 ===
By the fall of 1969, Sparks had left Stanley's band to pursue a solo career. He was briefly replaced by stand-in Joe Isaacs, before Roy Lee Centers took over on a permanent basis in November 1969. Around the time of Centers' arrival, Ron Thomason joined as the band's first official mandolin player, with former CMBs member Vernon "Jack" Cooke taking over from Shuffler on bass "a few weeks" later. Prior to Cooke's arrival, the new lineup (with Shuffler still in place) performed on Lee Allen's debut solo album, Songs of Love and Tragedy, which was issued by Jalyn the following year.

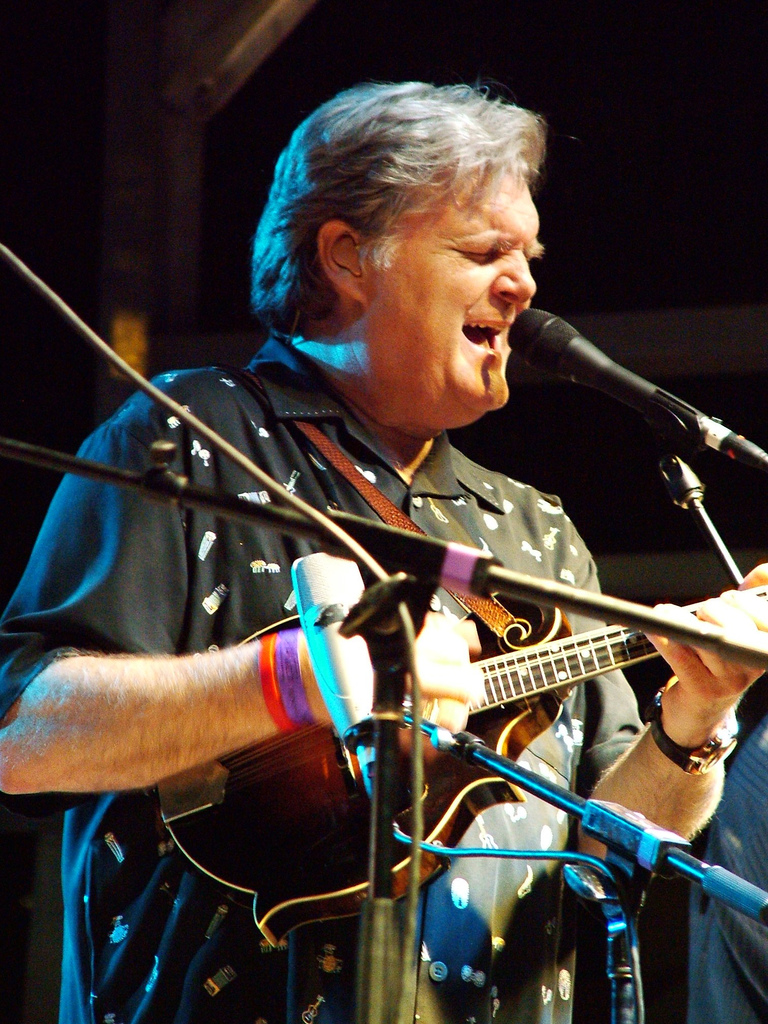
Ricky Skaggs joined the band in May 1970 alongside Keith Whitley, initially part-time.

In May 1970, Stanley hired 16-year-old musicians Keith Whitley on guitar and Ricky Skaggs on mandolin and fiddle, after seeing the pair performing an impromptu set of Stanley Brothers songs after the CMBs turned up late to a show. As they were still high school students, however, they were unable to be full-time members until they graduated the following spring. Thomason left the band around the fall of 1970 to return to his former career as a teacher. During recording sessions between February and December 1971, the new lineup recorded Cry from the Cross, Something Old, Something New, Sing Michigan Bluegrass, Old Country Church, Play Requests, and Gospel Echoes of the Stanley Brothers. The original quartet (without Whitley and Skaggs) also recorded Live in Japan and John Henry during a Japanese tour in May.

By the late summer/early fall of 1972, Whitley and Skaggs had both left the CMBs. Whitley was replaced before the end of the year by guitarist Ricky Lee. The group recorded The Stanley Sound Around the World in February 1973, followed by I Want to Preach the Gospel and A Man and His Music in March. The only other album released by this lineup is Live at the Smithsonian Institution, which was recorded live at two shows in March 1974 and issued in 1992. Shortly after the end of a tour in California, Roy Lee Centers was killed on the morning of May 2, 1974 after a fight with a fellow guest at a house party. After his funeral, Centers' position was filled by the returning Keith Whitley. The band recorded Let Me Rest on a Peaceful Mountain and Live! at McClure in 1975, before Lee left the band during the summer/fall that year.

Lee was replaced by Danny Marshall, who debuted on the February 1976 recording Old Home Place. By the spring of that year, he had been replaced by Troy "Renfro" Profitt, who performed on Clinch Mountain Gospel as his only studio album with the band. The new guitarist had left by the late summer/fall of 1977, with the band continuing as a four-piece until November, when Whitley also departed. Both Profitt and Whitley were replaced before the end of November by Hillard "Junior" Blankenship and Charlie Sizemore, respectively. This lineup remained stable for the next nine years, releasing the albums Down Where the River Bends (1978), I'll Wear a White Robe (1979), Snow Covered Mound (1980), Hymn Time (1980), The Stanley Sound Today (1981), The Memory of Your Smile (1982), Child of the King (1983), I Can Tell You the Time (1985), Singing Sixteen Years (1986), and Lonesome and Blue (1986). Sizemore left the CMBs in August 1986 to form his own group.

=== 1986–2003 ===
Sizemore was replaced by Sammy Adkins. The band recorded I'll Answer the Call in January 1988, before 16-year-old Ernie Thacker joined on mandolin that spring. Thacker had left again after nine months, but returned in the fall of 1989 to record Like Father, Like Son, the first album to feature Stanley's son Ralph II, then aged just 11 years old. The CMBs lineup changed a few times during the first six months of 1990 — first, in late-March, Adkins was sent to prison for assault, at which point Thacker took over as guitarist and lead vocalist. Just a couple of months later, Blankenship also left the band, with Larry Efaw's guitarist Chris Smith filling in for much of the spring. By late June/early July, the role of lead guitarist had been taken over by Ralph "Hank" Smith.

Smith performed on Holdin' On, Sacred Songs from the Past (with Bill Wicker), and Pray for the Boys, before Blankenship returned in the summer of 1991. The March 1992 recording Back to the Cross featured second fiddler Art Stamper, who had been brought in on a session basis due to Curly Ray Cline's ill health, as well as guest bass vocalist Shelton Feazell. The pair also performed on Saturday Night & Sunday Morning later that year, as well as 1993's Christmas Time recording. The latter was the final CMBs album to feature Cline, who retired just a few weeks after its recording, reportedly at the behest of Stanley himself. The fiddler died just over four years later, aged 64. Stamper took over the role of fiddler on a permanent basis after Cline's departure.

Stanley's son Ralph II made several appearances with the band as a child, before officially joining in 1995.

In March 1994, Thacker and Blankenship left Stanley's band to form their own group together. The pair were replaced by Kenneth Davis and James Alan Shelton, respectively. A couple of months later, the group enlisted its first additional banjo player in Steve Sparkman, initially on a stand-in basis after Stanley suffered injuries in a fall, but later as an official band member. The following August, the band's lineup changed again as Ralph Stanley II took over as guitarist and lead vocalist, John Rigsby joined on mandolin, and James Price replaced Stamper on fiddle. The new lineup debuted with Short Life of Trouble and the live album Clinch Mountain Boys Reunion in 1996, which were followed in 1997 by My All and All and in 1998 by Clinch Mountain Country. From late 1999 to early 2000, George Shuffler temporarily returned to the band in place of longstanding bassist Jack Cooke, who had to take a short time off for heart surgery. During his return, Shuffler recorded several tracks for 2001's Clinch Mountain Sweethearts.

=== 2003–2016 ===
By the fall or late 2003, James Price had been replaced in the CMBs by 18-year-old Todd Meade. The new fiddler performed on the album A Distant Land to Roam, but fiddles on the 2004 recordings Sings His Favorites Now and Then and Shine On were played by mandolinist John Rigsby. By June 2005, Dewey Brown had taken over as the band's full-time fiddle player. Later that year, Stanley's 13-year-old grandson Nathan officially took over from Rigsby, after having appeared onstage with the CMBs on various occasions since he was just 2 years old. Around the summer of 2007, Ralph II left to embark on a solo career and Nathan took over as guitarist and lead vocalist.

Around the summer/fall of 2008, Stanley's bassist of 39 years, Jack Cooke, was forced to retire due to ill health, with Audey Ratliff taking his place. Cooke died just over a year later after suffering a heart attack. Ratliff toured with the band for around eight months, before he was replaced by Jimmy Cameron. The new lineup recorded A Mother's Prayer during the summer of 2010, before Sparkman left the band that November and was replaced by Jarrod Church. Within a month, however, Church had been replaced by Mitchell Van Dyke. During 2011/2012, the band recorded 65 Years. In September 2013, Cameron was replaced by Randall Hibbits. In June 2014, James Alan Shelton died suddenly after a short battle with cancer of the liver and pancreas. The band recorded Stanley's final album Man of Constant Sorrow that November, for which Junior Blankenship returned on guitar. During 2015, Hibbits' nephew Alex joined the band on mandolin. In February 2016, both Randall Hibbitts and Mitchell Van Dyke announced their departures from the CMBs.

On June 23, 2016, Ralph Stanley died of skin cancer at the age of 89 years old, marking the end of his leadership of the Clinch Mountain Boys. Shortly before Stanley's death, it was announced that Ralph II would be inheriting the band and operating under its moniker in the future. In recent years, Nathan Stanley has challenged Ralph II's use of the band name.

== Members ==
=== Official ===
Image	Name	Years active	Instruments	Release contributions
	Ralph Stanley (1927–2016)	1967–2016	banjo; lead, tenor and occasional baritone vocals	all Ralph Stanley and the Clinch Mountain Boys releases
	"Curly" Ray Cline (1923–1997)	1966–1993	fiddle	all releases from Brand New Country Songs (1968) to Classic Stanley (1995), except Almost Home (1992); Reunion (1997); Live at Watermelon Park 1969 (2005); Live at Thomas Point Beach Bluegrass Festival (2017); Live in Seattle 1969 (2018); Live from Gettysburg (2018); Way Out West 1977 (2019); Live at the Greenwich Coonhunters Club (2021)
	Melvin Goins (1933–2016)	1966–1969	string bass; guitar	Brand New Country Songs (1968); Old Time Music (1968); Over the Sunset Hill (1968)
	George Shuffler (1925–2014)	1966–1967; 1969 (Note: Shuffler also appeared as a session musician in 1968, as a live guest in 1987, and as a live stand-in during 1999–2000.)	guitar (1966–1967); string bass (1969–1970); baritone and lead (1966–1967) vocals	Over the Sunset Hill (1968); Reunion (1997); Clinch Mountain Sweethearts (2001)
	Larry Sparks	1967–1969	guitar; lead and occasional baritone vocals	Brand New Country Songs (1968); Old Time Music (1968); The Bluegrass Sound (1968); Over the Sunset Hill (1968); Hills of Home (1969); Live at Watermelon Park 1969 (2005); Live in Seattle 1969 (2018)
	Roy Lee Centers (1944–1974)	1969–1974	guitar; lead and occasional baritone vocals	all releases from Cry from the Cross (1971) to A Man and His Music (1974); Live at the Smithsonian Institution (1992); Classic Stanley (1995)
	Ron Thomason	1969–1970	mandolin	Classic Stanley (1995)
	Vernon "Jack" Cooke (1936–2009)	1969–2008	string bass; baritone and tenor vocals	all releases from Cry from the Cross (1971) to At Merlefest, Wilkesboro, North Carolina (2008), except Live at Watermelon Park 1969 (2005); Live at Thomas Point Beach Bluegrass Festival (2017); Live from Gettysburg (2018); Way Out West 1977 (2019); Live at the Greenwich Coonhunters Club (2021)
	Keith Whitley (1954–1989)	1970–1972 (Note: Whitley and Skaggs only performed occasionally during their first year with the band, as they were still high school students. Once they graduated in the spring of 1971, they became full-time members.); 1974–1977	guitar; vocals (bass 1970–1972, lead/baritone 1974–1977)	Cry from the Cross (1971); Something Old, Something New (1971); Sing Michigan Bluegrass (1971); Old Country Church (1972); Play Requests (1972); Gospel Echoes of the Stanley Brothers (1973); all releases from Michigan Bluegrass Festival (1974) to Live at Lost Acres! (1978); The Berkshire Mountains Bluegrass Festival (1985); Classic Stanley (1995); Way Out West 1977 (2019)
	Ricky Skaggs	1970–1972	mandolin; fiddle; tenor and occasional baritone vocals	Cry from the Cross (1971); Something Old, Something New (1971); Sing Michigan Bluegrass (1971); Old Country Church (1972); Play Requests (1972); Gospel Echoes of the Stanley Brothers (1973); Classic Stanley (1995)
	Ricky Lee (1944/1945–2026)	1972–1975	guitar; bass vocals	all releases from I Want to Preach the Gospel (1973) to Live! at McClure (1976); Live at the Smithsonian Institution (1992); Classic Stanley (1995)
	Danny Marshall	1975–1976 (Note: Marshall also appeared as a session musician in 1977 and 1978.)	guitar; mandolin; bass vocals	Old Home Place (1976); Clinch Mountain Gospel (1977); Down Where the River Bends (1978)
	Troy "Renfro" Profitt (1950–2019)	1976–1977	guitar; tenor vocals	Tall Trees Bluegrass Festival 1976 (1976); Clinch Mountain Gospel (1977); Live at Lost Acres! (1978); The Berkshire Mountains Bluegrass Festival (1985); Classic Stanley (1995)
	Hillard "Junior" Blankenship (1960–2026)	1977–1990; 1991–1994; 2014–2016	guitar; occasional mandolin and bass vocals	all releases from Down Where the River Bends (1978) to Christmas Time (1993), except Live at the Smithsonian Institution (1992); Reunion (1997); Man of Constant Sorrow (2015); Live at Thomas Point Beach Bluegrass Festival (2017); Live from Gettysburg (2018); Live at the Greenwich Coonhunters Club (2021)
	Charlie Sizemore	1977–1986	guitar; lead and occasional baritone vocals	all releases from Down Where the River Bends (1978) to Winterhawk Scholarship Album (1986); Live from Gettysburg (2018); Live at the Greenwich Coonhunters Club (2021)
	Sammy Adkins	1986–1990	guitar; lead and occasional baritone vocals	all releases from You're Still to Blame (1987) to Like Father, Like Son (1990); Live at Thomas Point Beach Bluegrass Festival (2017)
	Ernie Thacker (1971–2018)	1988–1989; 1989–1994	mandolin; guitar (from spring 1990); lead (from spring 1990) and baritone vocals	all releases from Like Father, Like Son (1990) to Christmas Time (1993), except Sacred Songs from the Past (1990) and Live at the Smithsonian Institution (1992)
	Ralph "Hank" Smith (1956–2009)	1990–1991	guitar	Holdin' On (1990); Sacred Songs from the Past (1990); Pray for the Boys (1991)
	Art Stamper (1933–2005)	1992–1995 (Note: Stamper initially served as a session musician to support Curly Ray Cline during ill health. When Cline retired in May 1993, Stamper became a full-time member of the band.)	fiddle	Back to the Cross (1992); Saturday Night (1992); Sunday Morning (1992); Christmas Time (1993)
	James Alan Shelton (1960–2014)	1994–2014 (Note: Shelton had previously appeared as a live stand-in during 1992.)	guitar	all releases from Short Life of Trouble (1996) to 65 Years (2012), except Reunion (1997) and Live at Watermelon Park 1969 (2005); Bottom Line Archive (2017)
	Kenneth Davis	1994–1995	guitar; lead and occasional baritone vocals	none
	Steve Sparkman	1994–2010	banjo	all releases from Short Life of Trouble (1996) to A Mother's Prayer (2011), except Reunion (1997) and Live at Watermelon Park 1969 (2005)
	Ralph Stanley II	1995–2007 (Note: Prior to officially joining the CMBs, Stanley II made numerous guest appearances with his father's band, as well as performing on the 1990 album Like Father, Like Son.)	guitar; lead and occasional baritone vocals	Like Father, Like Son (1990); all releases from Short Life of Trouble (1996) to Anchored in Love: A Tribute to June Carter Cash (2007), except Reunion (1997) and Live at Watermelon Park 1969 (2005); A Mother's Prayer (2011)
	James Price (1964–2022)	1995–2003	fiddle; occasional string bass and bass vocals	all releases from Short Life of Trouble (1996) to Great High Mountain (2004), except Reunion (1997)
	John Rigsby	1995–1998; 1999–2005 (Note: Rigsby also appeared as a session musician in 2010 and 2011/12.)	mandolin; tenor vocals; occasional fiddle	Short Life of Trouble (1996); Clinch Mountain Boys Reunion (1996); My All and All (1997); Clinch Mountain Country (1997); all releases from While the Ages Roll On (2000) to A Distant Land to Roam (2006), except Live at Watermelon Park 1969 (2005); A Mother's Prayer (2011); 65 Years (2012)
	Todd Meade	2003–2005	fiddle; tenor vocals	A Distant Land to Roam (2006)
	Dewey Brown	2005–2016 (Note: Prior to officially joining the CMBs, Stanley also appeared as a session musician in 2004.)	fiddle; tenor vocals	all releases from Anchored in Love: A Tribute to June Carter Cash (2007) to Man of Constant Sorrow (2015)
	Nathan Stanley	2005–2016	mandolin (until 2007); guitar (from 2007); tenor and lead (from 2007) vocals	Sings His Favorites Now and Then (2004); Shine On (2005); all releases from Anchored in Love: A Tribute to June Carter Cash (2007) to Man of Constant Sorrow (2015)
	Audey Ratliff	2008–2009	string bass; baritone vocals	none
	Jimmy Cameron	2009–2013	string bass; baritone vocals	A Mother's Prayer (2011); 65 Years (2012)
	Jarrod Church	2010	banjo	none
	Mitchell Van Dyke	2010–2016	banjo	65 Years (2012); Man of Constant Sorrow (2015)
	Randall Hibbits	2013–2016	string bass; baritone vocals	Man of Constant Sorrow (2015)

=== Stand-in ===
Image	Name	Years active	Instruments	Details
	Barney Munger	1969	string bass	After Melvin Goins' departure in May 1969, Munger filled in for at least one show that month, in Seattle.
	Lonnie Bowlin	1969	guitar	Bowlin and Ferris performed with the CMBs in July 1969, featuring on Live at Watermelon Park 1969 (2005).
	Ed Ferris (1934–1993)	1969 (Note: Ferris also appeared as a session musician in 1971, 1972 and 1976.)	string bass	Bowlin and Ferris performed with the CMBs in July 1969, featuring on Live at Watermelon Park 1969 (2005).
	Cullen Galyean (1939–2010)	1969	mandolin	Galyean performed mandolin with Stanley and the CMBs on August 30, 31 and September 1, 1969.
	Benny Jarrell (1933–1987)	1969	string bass	Jarrell filled in for George Shuffler on bass for their show at the Camp Springs festival on August 30, 1969.
	Joe Isaacs	1969	guitar; lead vocals	After Larry Sparks' departure and before Roy Lee Centers' arrival, Isaacs filled in as the CMBs' vocalist.
	Leslie Keith (1906–1977)	1972	fiddle	Keith, a former CMBs member, filled in for regular fiddler Curly Ray Cline at a festival show in May 1972.
	Larry Efaw	1982	mandolin	Efaw performed at least one show with the CMBs, featured on Live at the Greenwich Coonhunters Club (2021).
	Claude "Buddy" Moore (1943–2024)	1983	guitar	Moore played guitar with Stanley and his band during 1983, featuring on the album Live at the Old Homeplace.
	Chris Smith	1990	guitar	After Junior Blankenship's departure, Chris Smith filled in for a couple of months before Hank Smith joined.

=== Session ===
Image	Name	Years active	Instruments	Release contributions
	Jim McCall (1930–2010)	1967; 1969	string bass	Brand New Country Songs (1968); Hills of Home (1969)
	Earl Taylor (1929–1984)	1967	mandolin; harmonica	Brand New Country Songs (1968)
	Jack Lynch (1930–2011)	1967; 1968	string bass	Old Time Music (1968); The Bluegrass Sound (1968)
	Richard "Curley" Lambert (1930–1982)	1967	mandolin	Old Time Music (1968)
	Frank Wakefield (1934–2024)	1968	mandolin	The Bluegrass Sound (1968)
	Jimmy Martin (1927–2005)	1969	mandolin; guitar	Hills of Home (1969)
	Cliff Waldron (1941–2024)	1971	handclaps	Cry from the Cross (1971)
	Lynn Hall	1971	string bass	Sing Michigan Bluegrass (1971) or Gospel Echoes of the Stanley Brothers (1971) (Note: In a fan newsletter, Ralph Stanley noted that Hall performed at "the Michigan session". Both Sing Michigan Bluegrass and Gospel Echoes of the Stanley Brothers were recorded in Michigan, so it is unclear to which he was referring.)
	John Duffey (1934–1996)	1973	mandolin; baritone vocals	I Want to Preach the Gospel (1973); A Man and His Music (1974)
	Chester "Pop" Marshall (1926–2006)	1977; 1980	bass vocals	Clinch Mountain Gospel (1977); Snow Covered Mound (1980)
	David Marshall	1980	backing vocals	Snow Covered Mound (1980)
	James King (1958–2016)	1985 (Note: King also appeared as a live guest in 1987.)	guitar; lead vocals	Stanley Brothers Classics (1986); Reunion (1997)
	Eddie Stubbs	1985	fiddle	Stanley Brothers Classics (1986)
	Shelton Feazell	1992–1993; 2000–2001; 2010	bass vocals	Back to the Cross (1992); Saturday Night (1992); Sunday Morning (1992); Christmas Time (1993); While the Ages Roll On (2000); Clinch Mountain Sweethearts (2001); A Mother's Prayer (2011)
	Mark Fain	2001	string bass	Clinch Mountain Sweethearts (2001)
	Terry Eldredge	2001	baritone vocals	Clinch Mountain Sweethearts (2001)
	Cheryl White	2001	baritone vocals	Clinch Mountain Sweethearts (2001)
	Dennis Crouch	2003	string bass	A Distant Land to Roam (2006)
	Mike Seeger	2003	autoharp	A Distant Land to Roam (2006)

== Lineups ==
Period	Members	Recordings
December 1966–February 1967	Ralph Stanley — banjo, tenor/lead vocals; George Shuffler — guitar, lead/baritone vocals; Curly Ray Cline — fiddle; Melvin Goins — string bass, guitar	none
February 1967–May 1969	Ralph Stanley — banjo, tenor/lead vocals; Larry Sparks — guitar, lead/baritone vocals; Curly Ray Cline — fiddle; Melvin Goins — string bass, guitar; Earl Taylor — mandolin (session, May and Oct. 1967); Jim McCall — string bass (session, May and Oct. 1967); Jack Lynch — string bass (session, Aug. 1967/Feb. 1968); Curley Lambert — mandolin (session, August 1967); Frank Wakefield — mandolin (session, mid Feb. 1968); George Shuffler — string bass (session, late Feb. 1968)	Brand New Country Songs (1968); Old Time Music (1968); The Bluegrass Sound (1968); Over the Sunset Hill (1968)
May 1969 (temporary lineup)	Ralph Stanley — banjo, tenor/lead vocals; Larry Sparks — guitar, lead/baritone vocals; Curly Ray Cline — fiddle; Barney Munger — string bass (stand-in)	Live in Seattle 1969 (2018)
Summer–fall 1969	Ralph Stanley — banjo, tenor/lead vocals; Larry Sparks — guitar, lead/baritone vocals; Curly Ray Cline — fiddle; George Shuffler — string bass, baritone vocals; Lonnie Bowlin — guitar (guest, early July); Ed Ferris — string bass (stand-in, early July); Jimmy Martin — mandolin, guitar (session, mid July); Jim McCall — string bass (session, mid July); Cullen Galyean — mandolin (guest, Aug.–Sep.); Benny Jarrell — string bass (stand-in, August)	Hills of Home (1969); Live at Watermelon Park 1969 (2005)
Fall/late 1969 (temporary lineup)	Ralph Stanley — banjo, tenor/lead vocals; Curly Ray Cline — fiddle; George Shuffler — string bass, baritone vocals; Joe Isaacs — guitar, lead vocals (stand-in)	none (Note: The November–December 1969 lineup did not record anything released under the Clinch Mountain Boys name, but did perform on Lee Allen's debut solo album Songs of Love and Tragedy, released in 1970.)
November–December 1969	Ralph Stanley — banjo, tenor/lead vocals; Roy Lee Centers — guitar, lead/baritone vocals; Ron Thomason — mandolin; Curly Ray Cline — fiddle; George Shuffler — string bass, baritone vocals	none
December 1969–May 1970	Ralph Stanley — banjo, tenor/lead vocals; Roy Lee Centers — guitar, lead/baritone vocals; Ron Thomason — mandolin; Curly Ray Cline — fiddle; Jack Cooke — string bass, baritone vocals	Classic Stanley (1995)^{3 tracks}
May–fall 1970	Ralph Stanley — banjo, tenor/lead vocals; Roy Lee Centers — guitar, lead/baritone vocals; Ron Thomason — mandolin; Curly Ray Cline — fiddle; Jack Cooke — string bass, baritone vocals; Keith Whitley — guitar, bass vocals (part-time); Ricky Skaggs — mandolin, fiddle, vocals (part-time)	none
Fall 1970–fall 1972	Ralph Stanley — banjo, tenor/lead vocals; Roy Lee Centers — guitar, lead/baritone vocals; Keith Whitley — guitar, bass vocals; Ricky Skaggs — mandolin, fiddle, tenor vocals; Curly Ray Cline — fiddle; Jack Cooke — string bass, baritone vocals; Ed Ferris — string bass (session, Feb. and Aug. 1971); Cliff Waldron — handclaps (session, February 1971); Lynn Hall — string bass (session, Aug. or Oct. 1971); Leslie Keith — fiddle (stand-in, May 1972)	Cry from the Cross (1971); Something Old, Something New (1971); Live in Japan (1971); Sing Michigan Bluegrass (1971); John Henry (1971); Old Country Church (1972); Play Requests (1972); Gospel Echoes of the Stanley Brothers (1973); Classic Stanley (1995)^{18 tracks}
Fall 1972–May 1974	Ralph Stanley — banjo, tenor/lead vocals; Roy Lee Centers — guitar, lead/baritone vocals; Ricky Lee — guitar, bass vocals; Curly Ray Cline — fiddle; Jack Cooke — string bass, baritone vocals; John Duffey — mandolin, vocals (session, March 1973)	I Want to Preach the Gospel (1973); The Stanley Sound Around the World (1973); A Man and His Music (1974); Live at the Smithsonian Institution (1992); Classic Stanley (1995)^{1 track}
Summer 1974–summer 1975	Ralph Stanley — banjo, tenor/lead vocals; Keith Whitley — guitar, lead/baritone vocals; Ricky Lee — guitar, bass vocals; Curly Ray Cline — fiddle; Jack Cooke — string bass, baritone vocals; Jimmy Martin — guitar, lead vocals (guest, May 1975); Bill Monroe — mandolin (guest, May 1975)	Michigan Bluegrass Festival (1974)^{V/A}; Let Me Rest on a Peaceful Mountain (1975); Live! at McClure (1976); Classic Stanley (1995)^{6 tracks}
Summer 1975–spring 1976	Ralph Stanley — banjo, tenor/lead vocals; Keith Whitley — guitar, lead/baritone vocals; Danny Marshall — guitar, mandolin, bass vocals; Curly Ray Cline — fiddle; Jack Cooke — string bass, baritone vocals; Ed Ferris — string bass (session, February 1976)	Old Home Place (1976)
Spring 1976–summer/fall 1977	Ralph Stanley — banjo, tenor/lead vocals; Keith Whitley — guitar, lead/baritone vocals; Renfro Profitt — guitar, tenor vocals; Curly Ray Cline — fiddle; Jack Cooke — string bass, baritone vocals; Danny Marshall — mandolin (session, May 1977); Pop Marshall — bass vocals (session, May 1977)	Tall Trees Bluegrass Festival 1976 (1976); Clinch Mountain Gospel (1977); Live at Lost Acres! (1978); The Berkshire Mountains Bluegrass Festival (1985)^{V/A}; Classic Stanley (1995)^{5 tracks}
Summer/fall–November 1977	Ralph Stanley — banjo, tenor/lead vocals; Keith Whitley — guitar, lead/baritone vocals; Curly Ray Cline — fiddle; Jack Cooke — string bass, baritone vocals	Way Out West 1977 (2019)
November 1977–August 1986	Ralph Stanley — banjo, tenor/lead vocals; Charlie Sizemore — guitar, lead/baritone vocals; Junior Blankenship — guitar; Curly Ray Cline — fiddle; Jack Cooke — string bass, baritone vocals; Danny Marshall — mandolin (session, March 1978); Pop Marshall — bass vocals (session, February 1980); David Marshall — vocals (session, February 1980); Larry Efaw — mandolin (guest, August 1982); Buddy Moore — guitar (guest, May 1983); James King — guitar, lead vocals (session, Dec. 1985); Eddie Stubbs — fiddle (session, December 1985)	Down Where the River Bends (1978); I'll Wear a White Robe (1980); Hymn Time (1980); The Stanley Sound Today (1981); The Memory of Your Smile (1982); The Charlotte Bluegrass Festival (1983); Child of the King (1983); Old Home Place (1983); I Can Tell You the Time (1985); Stanley Brothers Classics (1986); Singing Sixteen Years (1986); Lonesome and Blue (1986); Winterhawk Scholarship Album (1986); Live from Gettysburg (2018); Live at the Greenwich Coonhunters Club (2021)
August 1986–spring 1988	Ralph Stanley — banjo, tenor/lead vocals; Sammy Adkins — guitar, lead/baritone vocals; Junior Blankenship — guitar; Curly Ray Cline — fiddle; Jack Cooke — string bass, baritone vocals; James King — guitar, lead vocals (guest, March 1987); George Shuffler — guitar, vocals (guest, March 1987)	You're Still to Blame (1987); I'll Answer the Call (1988); It's Never Too Late (1988); What About You (1988); I Worship You (1989); Reunion (1997); Live at Thomas Point Beach Bluegrass Festival (2017)
Spring 1988–early 1989	Ralph Stanley — banjo, tenor/lead vocals; Sammy Adkins — guitar, lead/baritone vocals; Junior Blankenship — guitar; Ernie Thacker — mandolin, baritone vocals; Curly Ray Cline — fiddle; Jack Cooke — string bass, baritone vocals	none
Early–fall 1989	Ralph Stanley — banjo, tenor/lead vocals; Sammy Adkins — guitar, lead/baritone vocals; Junior Blankenship — guitar; Curly Ray Cline — fiddle; Jack Cooke — string bass, baritone vocals	none
Fall 1989–March 1990	Ralph Stanley — banjo, tenor/lead vocals; Sammy Adkins — guitar, lead/baritone vocals; Junior Blankenship — guitar; Ernie Thacker — mandolin, baritone vocals; Curly Ray Cline — fiddle; Jack Cooke — string bass, baritone vocals; Ralph Stanley II — guitar, vocals (session, Dec. 1989)	Like Father, Like Son (1990)
March–April/May 1990	Ralph Stanley — banjo, tenor/lead vocals; Ernie Thacker — guitar, lead/baritone vocals; Junior Blankenship — guitar; Curly Ray Cline — fiddle; Jack Cooke — string bass, baritone vocals	none
April/May–June/July 1990 (temporary lineup)	Ralph Stanley — banjo, tenor/lead vocals; Ernie Thacker — guitar, lead/baritone vocals; Curly Ray Cline — fiddle; Jack Cooke — string bass, baritone vocals; Chris Smith — guitar (stand-in)	none
June/July 1990–summer 1991	Ralph Stanley — banjo, tenor/lead vocals; Ernie Thacker — guitar, lead/baritone vocals; Hank Smith — guitar; Curly Ray Cline — fiddle; Jack Cooke — string bass, baritone vocals	Holdin' On (1990); Sacred Songs from the Past (1990); Pray for the Boys (1991)
Summer 1991–May 1993	Ralph Stanley — banjo, tenor/lead vocals; Ernie Thacker — guitar, lead/baritone vocals; Junior Blankenship — guitar; Curly Ray Cline — fiddle; Jack Cooke — string bass, baritone vocals; Art Stamper — fiddle (session, 1992–1993); Shelton Feazell — bass vocals (session, 1992–1993)	Back to the Cross (1992); Almost Home (1992); Saturday Night & Sunday Morning (1992); Planet Bluegrass (1993)^{V/A}; Christmas Time (1993)
May 1993–March 1994	Ralph Stanley — banjo, tenor/lead vocals; Ernie Thacker — guitar, lead/baritone vocals; Junior Blankenship — guitar; Art Stamper — fiddle; Jack Cooke — string bass, baritone vocals	none
March–June 1994	Ralph Stanley — banjo, tenor/lead vocals; Kenneth Davis — guitar, lead/baritone vocals; James Alan Shelton — guitar; Art Stamper — fiddle; Jack Cooke — string bass, baritone vocals	none
June 1994–August 1995	Ralph Stanley — banjo, tenor/lead vocals; Kenneth Davis — guitar, lead/baritone vocals; James Alan Shelton — guitar; Steve Sparkman — banjo (initially stand-in); Art Stamper — fiddle; Jack Cooke — string bass, baritone vocals	none
August 1995–early 1998	Ralph Stanley — banjo, tenor/lead vocals; Ralph Stanley II — guitar, lead/baritone vocals; James Alan Shelton — guitar; Steve Sparkman — banjo; John Rigsby — mandolin, tenor vocals; James Price — fiddle; Jack Cooke — string bass, baritone vocals	Short Life of Trouble (1996); Clinch Mountain Boys Reunion (1996); My All and All (1997); Clinch Mountain Country (1998)
Early 1998–fall 1999	Ralph Stanley — banjo, tenor/lead vocals; Ralph Stanley II — guitar, lead/baritone vocals; James Alan Shelton — guitar; Steve Sparkman — banjo; James Price — fiddle; Jack Cooke — string bass, baritone vocals	I Feel Like Singing Today (1999); At Bean Blossom (2000)^{V/A}
Fall 1999–fall/late 2003	Ralph Stanley — banjo, tenor/lead vocals; Ralph Stanley II — guitar, lead/baritone vocals; James Alan Shelton — guitar; Steve Sparkman — banjo; John Rigsby — mandolin, tenor vocals; James Price — fiddle; Jack Cooke — string bass, baritone vocals; George Shuffler — string bass (stand-in, 1999–2000); Shelton Feazell — bass vocals (session, 2000–2001); Mark Fain — string bass (session, spring 2001); Terry Eldredge — baritone vocals (session, spring 2001); Cheryl White — baritone vocals (session, spring 2001)	While the Ages Roll On (2000); Clinch Mountain Sweethearts (2001); Lost in the Lonesome Pines (2002); Live at McCabe's Guitar Shop (2002); The Legend Lives On: A Tribute to Bill Monroe (2003)^{V/A}; Merlefest Live! The Best of 2003 (2004)^{V/A}; Great High Mountain (2004); Bottom Line Archive (2017)
Fall/late 2003–June 2005	Ralph Stanley — banjo, tenor/lead vocals; Ralph Stanley II — guitar, lead/baritone vocals; James Alan Shelton — guitar; Steve Sparkman — banjo; John Rigsby — mandolin, fiddle, tenor vocals; Todd Meade — fiddle, tenor vocals; Jack Cooke — string bass, baritone vocals; Dennis Crouch — string bass (session, 2003); Mike Seeger — autoharp (session, 2003); Nathan Stanley — mandolin (session, 2004)	Sings His Favorites Now and Then (2004); Shine On (2005); A Distant Land to Roam (2006)
June–late 2005	Ralph Stanley — banjo, tenor/lead vocals; Ralph Stanley II — guitar, lead/baritone vocals; James Alan Shelton — guitar; Steve Sparkman — banjo; John Rigsby — mandolin, tenor vocals; Dewey Brown — fiddle, tenor vocals; Jack Cooke — string bass, baritone vocals	none
Late 2005–summer 2007	Ralph Stanley — banjo, tenor/lead vocals; Ralph Stanley II — guitar, lead/baritone vocals; James Alan Shelton — guitar; Steve Sparkman — banjo; Nathan Stanley — mandolin, tenor vocals; Dewey Brown — fiddle, tenor vocals; Jack Cooke — string bass, baritone vocals	Anchored in Love (2007)^{V/A}
Summer 2007–fall 2008	Ralph Stanley — banjo, tenor/lead vocals; Nathan Stanley — guitar, lead/tenor vocals; James Alan Shelton — guitar; Steve Sparkman — banjo; Dewey Brown — fiddle, tenor vocals; Jack Cooke — string bass, baritone vocals	At Merlefest, Wilkesboro, North Carolina (2008)
Fall 2008–summer 2009	Ralph Stanley — banjo, tenor/lead vocals; Nathan Stanley — guitar, lead/tenor vocals; James Alan Shelton — guitar; Steve Sparkman — banjo; Dewey Brown — fiddle, tenor vocals; Audey Ratliff — string bass, baritone vocals	none
Summer 2009–November 2010	Ralph Stanley — banjo, tenor/lead vocals; Nathan Stanley — guitar, lead/tenor vocals; James Alan Shelton — guitar; Steve Sparkman — banjo; Dewey Brown — fiddle, tenor vocals; Jimmy Cameron — string bass, baritone vocals; Ralph Stanley II — guitar, vocals (session, 2010); John Rigsby — mandolin, vocals (session, 2010); Shelton Feazell — bass vocals (session, 2010)	A Mother's Prayer (2011)
November–December 2010	Ralph Stanley — banjo, tenor/lead vocals; Nathan Stanley — guitar, lead/tenor vocals; James Alan Shelton — guitar; Jarrod Church — banjo; Dewey Brown — fiddle, tenor vocals; Jimmy Cameron — string bass, baritone vocals	none
December 2010–September 2013	Ralph Stanley — banjo, tenor/lead vocals; Nathan Stanley — guitar, lead/tenor vocals; James Alan Shelton — guitar; Mitchell Van Dyke — banjo; Dewey Brown — fiddle, tenor vocals; Jimmy Cameron — string bass, baritone vocals; Ralph Stanley II — guitar, vocals (session, 2011/2012); John Rigsby — mandolin, vocals (session, 2011/2012)	65 Years (2012)
September 2013–June 2014	Ralph Stanley — banjo, tenor/lead vocals; Nathan Stanley — guitar, lead/tenor vocals; James Alan Shelton — guitar; Mitchell Van Dyke — banjo; Dewey Brown — fiddle, tenor vocals; Randall Hibbits — string bass, baritone vocals	none
Fall 2014–2015	Ralph Stanley — banjo, tenor/lead vocals; Nathan Stanley — guitar, lead/tenor vocals; Junior Blankenship — guitar; Mitchell Van Dyke — banjo; Dewey Brown — fiddle, tenor vocals; Randall Hibbits — string bass, baritone vocals	Man of Constant Sorrow (2015)
2015–February 2016	Ralph Stanley — banjo, tenor/lead vocals; Nathan Stanley — guitar, lead/tenor vocals; Junior Blankenship — guitar; Mitchell Van Dyke — banjo; Alex Hibbitts — mandolin; Dewey Brown — fiddle, tenor vocals; Randall Hibbits — string bass, baritone vocals	none
