= The Stanley Brothers =

American bluegrass duo (1946–1966)

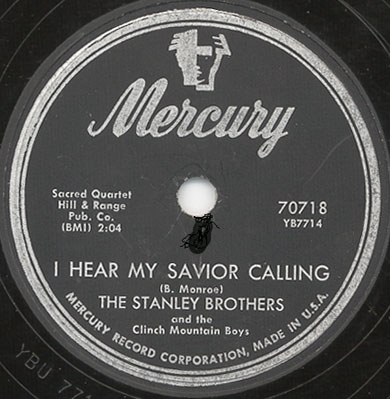
- Label of the Stanley Brothers' single "I Hear My Savior Calling"

Background information
- Origin: Dickenson County, Virginia, U.S.
- Genres: bluegrass; Appalachian folk; country; gospel
- Years active: 1946–1966
- Labels: Rich-R-Tone; Columbia; Mercury; King; Starday; Wango; Rimrock; Old Homestead
- Past members: Carter Stanley; Ralph Stanley

The Stanley Brothers were an American bluegrass duo of singer-songwriters and musicians, made up of brothers Carter Stanley (August 27, 1925 – December 1, 1966) and Ralph Stanley (February 25, 1927 – June 23, 2016). Ralph and Carter performed as The Stanley Brothers with their band, The Clinch Mountain Boys, from 1946 to 1966. Ralph kept the band name when he continued as a solo artist after Carter's death, from 1967 until his own death in 2016.

The Stanley Brothers were inducted into the Country Music Hall of Fame in 2026.

== Early lives ==
Carter and Ralph Stanley were born on a small farm in Dickenson County, Virginia. Music was a part of their lives even in their early years, and they listened to the Monroe Brothers, J. E. Mainer's Mountaineers and the Grand Ole Opry on local radio.

== Careers ==
The brothers formed a band, the Lazy Ramblers, and performed as a duo on WJHL radio in Johnson City, Tennessee. World War II interrupted their musical career, but once both brothers returned from the United States Army, they resumed their musical pursuits. They formed their band, the Stanley Brothers and the Clinch Mountain Boys, in the month of November 1946 as the first band to copy the Monroe sound. Carter played guitar and sang lead, while Ralph played banjo and sang with a strong, high tenor voice. Additional members of this early band were Darrell "Pee Wee" Lambert on mandolin and Bobby Sumner on fiddle. Sumner soon was replaced by Leslie Keith.

On December 26, 1946, the band began performing at radio station WCYB in Bristol, Tennessee as stalwarts of the famed Farm and Fun Time radio show. They made their recording debut in September 1947 for Rich-R-Tone Records which had been founded the year before. Their records sold well, "outselling even Eddy Arnold" regionally. Up to now, Ralph had been playing his banjo with two fingers on recordings and in concerts, but in 1948, he switched to the three-finger style (popularised by Earl Scruggs). In March 1949, the Stanley Brothers began recording for Columbia Records. During this time, Bill Monroe was not particularly fond of groups like the Stanley Brothers and Flatt & Scruggs who he believed "stole" his music by copying it; they were seen as "economic threats."

Financially hard times in the early 1950s forced the brothers to take a short break in their musical career. They began working for the Ford Motor Company in Detroit. Eventually, Monroe and the Stanley Brothers became friends, and Carter performed for several months with Bill Monroe in the summer of 1951. In August 1951, Ralph was involved in a serious automobile accident that almost ended his career. Following his recovery, Carter and Ralph reunited to front their Clinch Mountain Boys.

As bluegrass music grew less popular in the late 1950s, the Stanley Brothers moved to Live Oak, Florida and headlined the weekly Suwannee River Jamboree radio show on WNER from 1958 to 1962. The three-hour show was also syndicated across the Southeast. In 1966, the brothers toured Europe, and upon returning home, they continued to perform together until Carter's death in December 1966.

Many years later, Ralph revived the Clinch Mountain Boys until his death in 2016. He performed with them through 2013. He recorded one last album in 2014, Side By Side, with his son, Ralph II. Among the musicians who have played in the revived Clinch Mountain Boys were Ricky Skaggs, Keith Whitley, Larry Sparks, Curly Ray Cline, Jack Cooke, Roy Lee Centers, Charlie Sizemore, Ray Goins, and Ralph Stanley II. Ralph's career received a big boost with his prominent role on the very successful soundtrack recording of the 2000 feature film, O Brother, Where Art Thou?, which featured the song "Man of Constant Sorrow" among others.

== Legacy ==
The Stanley Brothers were inducted into the International Bluegrass Music Hall of Honor in 1992. In 2005, the Barter Theatre in Abingdon, Virginia premiered an original stage production, Man of Constant Sorrow: The Story of the Stanley Brothers, written by Dr. Douglas Pote.

The University Press of Mississippi published the first full-length biography of the Stanley Brothers, Lonesome Melodies: The Lives and Music of the Stanley Brothers by David W. Johnson, on February 1, 2013. The paperback edition was published March 1, 2014.

== Selected recordings ==
Among the Stanley Brothers' best known recordings are:

- I'm a Man of Constant Sorrow (Columbia 20816, Rec: Nov. 3, 1950, Released: May, 1951)
- Rank Stranger
- Angel Band (1955)
- How Mountain Girls Can Love
- How Far to Little Rock? (novelty)
- Still Trying to Get to Little Rock (novelty)
- Ridin' That Midnite Train
- Clinch Mountain Backstep
- She's More to Be Pitied
- The Memory of Your Smile
- Love Me Darlin' Just Tonight

== Clinch Mountain Boys members ==
- Carter Stanley (lead vocalist, steel-string guitar)
- Ralph Stanley (banjo)
- George Shuffler (steel-string guitar, bass)
- Darrell "Pee Wee" Lambert (mandolin)
- Jim Williams (mandolin)
- Curly Lambert (mandolin, steel-string guitar)
- James Price (fiddle)
- Robert "Bobby" Sumner (fiddle)
- Lester Woodie (fiddle) (died 2018)
- Ralph Mayo (fiddle, steel-string guitar)
- Chubby Anthony (fiddle)
- Art Stamper (fiddle)
- Joe Meadows (fiddle)
- Paul Moon Mullins (fiddle)
- Red Stanley (fiddle)
- Don Miller (fiddle)
- Vernon Derrick (fiddle, steel-string guitar)
- Curly Ray Cline (fiddle)
- James "Jay" Hughes (bass)
- Ernie Newton (bass)
- James "Chick" Stripling (bass)
- Mike Seeger (bass)
- Charlie Cline (steel-string guitar)
- Bill Napier (steel-string guitar, mandolin)
- Albert Elliott (mandolin, bass, and baritone vocals) better known as Touser Murphy as his stage name
- Larry Sparks (steel-string guitar)
- James Alan Shelton (guitar)
- Jack Cooke (bass)
- John Shuffler (bass)
- Melvin Goins (bass, steel-string guitar)
- Johnny Bonds (bass)
- Bill Slaughter (bass)

== Discography ==
=== 78 RPM ===
Year	Title	Label	Number
1947	"Mother No Longer Awaits Me at Home" / "The Girl Behind the Bar"	Rich-R-Tone	420
1948	"Little Maggie" / "The Little Glass of Wine"	Rich-R-Tone	423
1948	"The Rambler's Blues" / "Molly and Tenbrooks"	Rich-R-Tone	418
1949	"The Jealous Lover" / "Our Darling's Gone"	Rich-R-Tone	435
1949	"The White Dove" / "Gathering Flowers for the Master's Bouquet"	Columbia	20577
1949	"Little Glass of Wine" / "Let Me Be Your Friend"	Columbia	20590
1949	"The Angels are Singing (in Heaven Tonight)" / "It's Never Too Late"	Columbia	20617
1949	"A Vision of Mother" / "Have You Someone (in Heaven Awaiting)"	Columbia	20647
1950	"The Old Home" / "The Fields Have Turned Brown"	Columbia	20667
1950	"Death is Only a Dream" / "I Can Tell You the Time"	Rich-R-Tone	466
1950	"I Love No One But You" / "Too Late to Cry"	Columbia	20697
1950	"We'll Be Sweethearts in Heaven" / "The Drunkard's Hell"	Columbia	20735
1950	"Hey! Hey! Hey!" / "Pretty Polly"	Columbia	20770
1951	"The Lonesome River" / "I'm a Man of Constant Sorrow"	Columbia	20816
1952	"Sweetest Love" / "The Wandering Boy"	Columbia	20953
1952	"Little Girl and the Dreadful Snake" / "Are You Waiting Just for Me?"	Rich-R-Tone	1055
1952	"Little Glass of Wine" / "Little Birdie"	Rich-R-Tone	1056
1953	"This Weary Heart You Stole Away" / "I'm Lonesome Without You"	Mercury	70217
1953	"Say Won't You Be Mine" / "Our Last Goodbye"	Mercury	70270
1954	"I Long to See the Old Folks" / "A Voice from on High"	Mercury	70340
1954	"Memories of Mother" / "Could You Love Me One More Time"	Mercury	70400
1954	"Poison Lies" / "Dickson County Breakdown"	Mercury	70437-X45
1954	"Blue Moon of Kentucky" / "I Just Got Wise"	Mercury	70453-X45
1954	"Calling from Heaven" / "Harbor of Love"	Mercury	70483-X45
1955	"Hard Times" / "I Worship You"	Mercury	70546-X45
1955	"So Blue" / "You'd Better Get Right"	Mercury	70612-X45
1955	"Lonesome and Blue" / "Orange Blossom Special"	Mercury	70663-X45
1955	"I Hear My Savior Calling" / "Just a Little Talk with Jesus"	Mercury	70718-X45
1956	"Nobody's Love Is like Mine"/ "Big Tilda"	Mercury	70789-X45
1956	"Baby Girl" / "Say You'll Take Me Back"	Mercury	70886-X45
1957	"I'm Lost, I'll Never Find the Way" / "The Flood"	Mercury	71064-X45
1957	"Fling Ding" / "Loving You Too Well"	Mercury	71207-X45
1958	"She's More to Be Pitied" / "Train 45"	King	5155
1958	"Midnight Ramble" / "Love Me Darling Just Tonight"	King	5165
1959	"Keep a Memory" / "Mastertone March"	King	5180
1959	"How Can We Thank Him" / "That Home Far Away"	King	5197
1959	"The Memory of Your Smile" / "Suwanee River Hoedown"	King	5210
1959	"The White Dove" / "Mother's Footsteps Guide Me On"	King	5233

=== Albums (US) ===
Year	Title	Label	Number	Notes
1958	Country Pickin' and Singin'	Mercury	MG-20349	
1959	Stanley Brothers & The Clinch Mountain Boys	King	615	
1959	Hymns and Sacred Songs	King	645	
1959	Mountain Song Favorites Featuring 5 String Banjo	Starday	SLP 106	reissued 1964 as Nashville NLP-2014
1960	Sacred Songs from the Hills	Starday	SLP-122	
1960	The Stanley Brothers Sing Everybody's Country Favorites	King	690	
1960	For the Good People: Sacred Songs	King	698	
1961	The Stanley's In Person	King	719	Stereo
1961	Stanley Brothers Live at Antioch College - 1960	Vintage Collector's Club	ZK 002	limited edition of 500
1961	Sing the Songs They Like Best	King	772	
1961	The Stanley Brothers	Harmony	HL-7291	recorded in 1949
1961	Old Country Church	Gusto	0084	
1962	Award Winners at the Folk Song Festival	King	791	live
1962	Good Old Camp Meeting Songs	King	805	
1962	The Mountain Music Sound of the Stanley Brothers	Starday	SLP-201	
1962	Old Time Camp Meeting	King	750	
1963	Folk Concert from the Heart of America	King	834	reissued as Hollywood HT-248 Just Because
1963	The Country Folk Music Spotlight	King	864	
1963	The World's Finest Five String Banjo	King	872	alternate title: Banjo in the Hills
1963	Hard Times	Mercury	MG 20884	SR 60884 stereo
1964	Hymns of the Cross	King	918	with George Shuffler
1965	The Remarkable Stanley Brothers Play and Sing Bluegrass Songs for You	King	924	
1965	Songs of Mother and Home	Wango	LP 106	reissued 1973 as County 738
1966	The Stanley Brothers: Their Original Recordings	Melodeon	MLP 7322	1947 Rich-R-Tone sessions, recorded in Bristol, Tennessee
1966	A Collection of Original Gospel & Sacred Songs	King	963	original title: The Greatest Country and Western Show On Earth
1966	Jacob's Vision	Starday	SLP-384	
1966	The Stanley Brothers Goes to Europe	Rimrock	RLP 200	
1966	The Angels are Singing	Harmony	HL 7377	HS 11177 stereo
1966	Carter & Ralph	Starday	NLP-2037	
1966	John's Gospel Quartet	Wango	LP 103	reissued 1977 as County 753
1966	John's Country Quartet	Wango	LP 104	reissued 1973 as County 739
1966	John's Gospel Quartet	Wango	LP 105	reissued 1976 as County 754
1966	Bluegrass Gospel Favorites	Cabin Creek	203	
1967	Stanley Brothers Sing the Best-Loved Sacred Songs of Carter Stanley	King	1013	
1967	An Empty Mansion: In Memory of Carter Stanley	Rimrock	RLP 153	reissued 1978 as Old Homestead 118
1967	A Beautiful Life	Rimrock	RLP 200	reissued 1978 as Old Homestead 119
1967	Gospel Singing as Pure as the Mountain Stream	Rimrock	RLP 200	
1969	How Far to Little Rock	King	KLP-1046	
1970	Sweeter Than the Flowers	Nashville	NLP-2078	also NA7-2046-2
1970	The Legendary Stanley Brothers, Recorded Live	Rebel	SLP 1487	
1970	The Legendary Stanley Brothers, Recorded Live, Vol 2	Rebel	SLP 1495	
1971	Together for the Last Time	Lisa Joy	10329	recorded live in 1956 and 1966, reissued 1972 as Rebel SLP 1512
1972	On Radio: Great 1960 Radio Shows	Rebel	1115	recorded in Live Oak, Florida
1972	Stanley Brothers - Together for the Last Time	Rebel	SLP-1512	
1973	Stanley Brothers of Virginia	County	739	
1976	Stanley Brothers on the Air	Wango	115	
1980	Columbia Sessions Vol. 1	Rounder	SS-09	
1980	Columbia Sessions Vol. 2	Rounder	SS-10	
1984	On Radio Vol. 1	County	780	
1984	On Radio Vol. 2	County	781	
1984	Starday Sessions	County	106/107	
1988	The Stanley Brothers on WCYB Bristol Farm & Fun Time	Rebel	855	recorded 1947
1994	Clinch Mountain Bluegrass	Vanguard	77018-2	live, Newport Folk Festival, 1959 and 1964
1997	Earliest Recordings	Rich-R-Tone	6004	recorded 1947–1952
2004	An Evening Long Ago	Legacy Recordings	CK-86747	recorded in Bristol, VA, March 1956
2004	The Last Show of the Stanley Brothers: Brown County Jamboree	Stanleytone		recorded in Bean Blossom, IN, October 16, 1966

=== Video ===
Year	Title	Label	Number	Notes
2005	Rainbow Quest: The Stanley Brothers and Doc Watson	Shanachie	605	DVD, season 1, episode 18, 1965

== Charted singles ==
Year	Single	US Country
1960	"How Far to Little Rock"	17
