= Roy Wiggins =

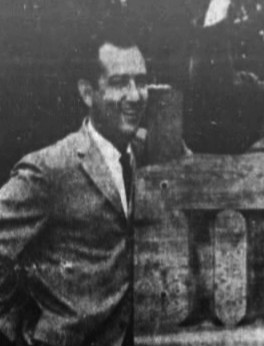

Background information
- Born: Ivan Leroy Wiggins; June 27, 1926; Nashville, Tennessee
- Died: August 3, 1999 (aged 73) Sevierville, Tennessee
- Genres: country
- Occupation: steel guitarist
- Years active: 1943–1970s
- Labels: Diplomat; Dot; Starday; Stoneway

Roy Wiggins (June 27, 1926 – August 3, 1999), known professionally as Little Roy Wiggins, was an American steel guitarist who is best known for his work with Eddy Arnold. Wiggins began playing professionally at a young age. As Eddy Arnold's first hire, he developed a signature "ting-a-ling" sound that helped make Arnold the most popular country entertainer for a period. As Arnold moved towards pop music, Wiggins' instrumental work was faded to the background, and then dropped entirely. Wiggins then made several solo instrumental recordings, and toured with other country musicians. Late in life he played for tourists in Tennessee.

== Biography ==
=== Early life and career ===
Wiggins was born Ivan Leroy Wiggins on June 27, 1926, in Nashville, Tennessee. At the age of six, Wiggins became fascinated with the Hawaiian guitars he heard on Grand Ole Opry broadcasts, and particularly the playing of Burt Hutcherson, who was also a family friend. Soon afterwards his mother purchased a guitar for him from a traveling salesman, and he began taking lessons from Robert E. Martin. He developed his skills quickly enough that by age fifteen he was playing professionally for Paul Howard and his Arkansas Cotton Pickers. Here Wiggins earned the moniker "Little" for both his youth and his small stature. In 1943 he joined Pee Wee King's band the Golden West Cowboys, an outfit which included Eddy Arnold. When King's regular guitarist, Clell Summey, returned from participation in World War II, Wiggins was out of a job.

=== With Eddy Arnold ===
Soon after, still in 1943, Arnold left the Golden West Cowboys to pursue a solo career, and on the advice of King he hired Wiggins as the first musician in his new backing band. At the beginning of his time with Arnold, Wiggins played a Gibson EH-125, but he soon upgraded to the Gibson Console Grande model. Arnold promised Wiggins lifetime employment in 1945, on condition that Wiggins not embarrass Arnold. Arnold's sound, built around Wiggins' steel guitar playing, became enormously successful to the point that Arnold held the number-one position on Billboard's country chart for forty weeks in 1948. As a result, Wiggins became one of the most-heard instrumentalists in country music, but he was considerably younger than most of his co-performers. He therefore felt ostracized by the other musicians, and he believed it adversely affected him psychologically. By 1952 Arnold was trending towards a more popular sound, and Wiggins' guitar work was moved towards the background. Further adding to Wiggins' discomfort were the actions of Arnold's manager, Colonel Tom Parker. Wiggins had been receiving $100 a week in sales commissions, but Parker began to claim all music and record sales commissions for himself. Although Arnold benefited financially from Parker's management, Wiggins did not replace the lost income. Wiggins did not appear at all on 1954's "I Really Don't Want to Know", and by 1955 Arnold had determined that his future was directly tied to popular music; thus Wiggins was utilized less and less as the 1950s progressed. Finding less to do with Arnold, Roy began making instrumental records in the mid-1950s. Some of these records were for significant mainstream labels such as Dot, others were for budget labels such as Diplomat, and others were for niche country labels large and small such as Starday and Stoneway. He also joined Arnold's accountant, Charles Mosley, in an insurance and real estate establishment in Brentwood, Tennessee. He became employed by Vox Instruments not only as a spokesperson, but as an agent to acquire the endorsements of other country-music instrumentalists. On Arnold's recordings, Steve Sholes would often mute Wiggins' guitar, which led to resentment on Wiggins' part.

I have a very distinctive honor. I ruined 80 million Eddy Arnold records.

— Roy Wiggins

His last recording with Arnold took place in 1961, but Wiggins continued to tour with Arnold, was given a piece of Arnold's publishing company, and remained employed by him until 1968. Arnold would have kept Wiggins on his payroll, honoring the lifetime contract, but Wiggins desired a more active role in the music world. Wiggins took it personally that he was no longer needed by Arnold, and for years had dreams that Arnold would give him a call for another session or tour.

=== Later career and life ===
Wiggins owned and operated a music store close to the Grand Old Opry's Ryman Auditorium in downtown Nashville beginning in 1968, after leaving Arnold. He continued to work with the Opry, backing Ernest Ashworth, The Willis Brothers, and most significantly George Morgan, with whom he recorded and toured until Morgan's death. In 1972, Wiggins began hosting a radio show for WTMS in Murfreesboro, Tennessee. The show, entitled Little Roy Wiggins Music City Show, originated from his music shop in Nashville.

In 1973 Morgan recorded a tribute to Wiggins, "Mr. Ting-a-Ling (Steel Guitar Man)" which featured Wiggins' playing.

Wiggins shut down his music store in 1974 when the Opry moved out of Ryman. In the 1980s he moved to Pigeon Forge, Tennessee, where he used to earn money by playing for tourists. He was included in the Steel Guitar Hall of Fame in 1985. Later in life he suffered from severe diabetes, complications from which caused his death on August 3, 1999.

== Style ==
Wiggins' playing was highly influenced by the Hawaiian guitar, emphasizing sweetness in tone. His "ting-a-ling" sound, a "high-pitched, vibrating effect", was developed from listening to acoustic dobro players, particularly Brother Oswald, but the technique had not been used on the electric steel guitar until Wiggins adapted it at an octave higher for the style with which he was associated for his entire career. Wiggins' effect was accomplished by using the index finger and thumb to create a fast tremolo on adjacent strings, while simultaneously vibrating the steel bar to add additional vibrato. Wiggins continued to use the non-pedal steel long after the pedal steel guitar became the norm. Along with Jerry Byrd, Wiggins is considered the most influential of the early steel guitar players. He was a significant influence on Lloyd Green.

== Solo discography ==
=== Albums ===
- "Little Roy Wiggins Salutes Eddy Arnold" (Starday, 1962)
- "Songs I Played for Eddy Arnold" (Diplomat, 1963)
- "The Fabulous Steel Guitar of Little Roy Wiggins" (Starday, 1964)
- "18 All Time Hits" (Starday, 1966)

=== Singles ===
- "Bouquet of Roses" (Dot)
