= Charlie Cline =

American bluegrass musician (1931–2004)

Charles Cline (June 6, 1931 in Baisden, Mingo County, West Virginia - November 19, 2004), was an American bluegrass fiddler and multi-instrumentalist, known for being the sideman of several legendary bluegrass groups from the 1950s and well into the 1980s.

== Biography ==
Cline learned to play the fiddle properly from Fiddlin' Arthur Smith, who lived in his parents house around the year 1940. In the late 1940s, Cline became a member of the Lonesome Pine Fiddlers, a radio band formed in 1937 based in Bluefield, West Virginia. The band consisted of his brothers, Curly Ray Cline and Ned Cline, his cousin Ezra Cline, and Larry Richardson.

== Cline's Time with Monroe & Later Career ==
Cline's Banjo player, Larry Richardson, had been offered a job with Bill Monroe's Bluegrass Boys in the early 1950s, and was instrumental in bringing Charlie Cline into the group. Cline recorded 32 songs with the Bluegrass Boys between 1952 and 1955, playing every instrument but the mandolin. Monroe brought Charlie Cline to the Stanley Brothers recording session, where they recorded their duet version of Blue Moon of Kentucky. Charlie Cline played the guitar on the recording in the style that Clyde Moody once played. It was the first time that lead guitar was used on the Stanley Brothers recordings - which would soon become an essential part of their sound. Charlie Cline was also a part of the famous back-stage jam with Monroe that led Carlton Haney to develop his passion for bluegrass music. In the following years, he continued to perform with the Lonesome Pine Fiddlers, The Stanley Brothers, The Osborne Brothers and Jimmy Martin's Sunny Mountain Boys. In 1986, he appeared with the Warrior River Boys. Cline died in 2004 at Shadescrest Healthcare Center in Jasper, Alabama. Cline was one of the many fiddlers who was given the opportunity to play on Bristol's famous WCYB radio station, which played a large role in bluegrass music in the late 40's through the 60's.
