= Curly Ray Cline =

- Birth name: Ray Cline
- Also known as: "The Old Kentucky Fox Hunter"
- Born: January 10, 1923
- Origin: Baisden, West Virginia
- Died: August 19, 1997 (aged 74)
- Genres: Bluegrass, old-time
- Instrument: Fiddle
- Years active: 1938 – 1993
- Formerly of: Lonesome Pine Fiddlers, Clinch Mountain Boys

Curly Ray Cline (born Ray Cline; January 10, 1923 – August 19, 1997) was an American bluegrass fiddler from West Virginia known for his work with the Lonesome Pine Fiddlers and Ralph Stanley.

== Biography ==
Cline was born in Mingo County, West Virginia. He learned the basics from his father, but other than that he was self-taught. While he was growing up playing the fiddle, he was inspired by Fiddlin' Arthur Smith of the Grand Ole Opry. Curly and his brothers were all musically talented, but Curly Ray and brother Charlie Cline were especially gifted.

When Curly Ray was 15 years old, he, along with his cousin Ezra and brother Ned formed the Lonesome Pine Fiddlers around 1938. The Lonesome Pine Fiddlers started off playing on radio station WHIS in the nearby town of Bluefield, where they remained until 1952. Although during this time Curly and brother Charlie Cline were also playing in Jimmy Martin's band, the Sunny Mountain Boys. Occasionally, Curly Ray did studio work for many musicians such as Jimmy Martin, Bobby Osborne, Rex and Eleanor Parker and Hobo Jack Adkins. He continued to perform with the Fiddlers intermittently through the early 1960s.

In early 1963, Curly Ray left the Fiddlers to play with The Stanley Brothers. He played with them on a part-time basis until Carter Stanley's death in 1966. When Ralph Stanley reconfigured the band in 1967, Curly Ray signed on as his full-time fiddler. Curly Ray appears on every succeeding record until his retirement in 1993. He was succeeded by fellow West Virginian James Price.

Curly Ray's fiddling blended in perfectly with Ralph Stanley's music. Curly's playing was that of the old time bluegrass. Cline had a deep passion for old time music, as he did for bluegrass. Ralph Stanley felt the same way about his music. The two became very good friends while touring together. Ralph Stanley said of Curly Ray, at Curly Ray's funeral: "He plays the fiddle sort of the way I play the banjo, he plays it the way he feels it."

While playing in Ralph Stanley's Clinch Mountain Boys, Curly Ray released a few solo, mostly instrumental, records. On these albums, Cline combined his own vocal sound effects, including sounds of barking hounds and braying mules, with traditional bluegrass songs. He did hardly any solo singing until about 1972, when he began to sing comedy numbers to add variety to Ralph's shows.

== Discography ==
- And His Lonesome Pine Fiddle (Melody MLP-17) 1969
- The Working Man (Jalyn JLP-126) 1970
- Chicken Reel (Rebel SLP-1498) 1971
- They Cut Down the Old Pine Tree (Rebel SLP-1509) 1972
- My Little Home In West Virginia (Rebel SLP-1515) 1972
- Fishing For Another Hit (Rebel SLP-1531) 1974
- Why Me Ralph? (Rebel SLP-1545) 1975
- It's Bread And Water For... (Rebel SLP-1566) 1977
- Who's Gonna Mow My Grass (Rebel SLP-1577) 1978
- Boar Hog (Old Homestead OHS-90138) 1980
- The Old Kentucky Fox Hunter Plays Gospel (Old Homestead OHS-70047) 1982
- Smarter Than The Average Idiot (Tin Ear TE-33010) 1984
- The Deputy (Nashville Country NCLP 101) 1988
- Together Again At Their Best (River Track Studios RTS-1341) c1990 (cassette shown as by Curly Ray, Charley and Timmy Cline)
