= Leslie Keith =

American musician (1906–77)

Leslie Keith (March 30, 1906 – December 28, 1977) was an American bluegrass musician. Born in Pulaski County in Virginia, he was known as a formidable fiddler who won many contests. Keith once played with Ralph Stanley and the Clinch Mountain Boys, as well as The Stanley Brothers. He is best known for the tune he put together out of pieces of older tunes, "Black Mountain Blues".

In 1938, Keith and another champion fiddler rented a park and invited fiddlers to compete. It was evidently successful, as 27 fiddlers and a crowd of 9,400 showed up. By the late 1940s, Leslie was fiddler for Curly King and the Tennessee Hilltoppers, as featured on WCYB radio in Bristol, Virginia.

He lived his final days in Tucson, Arizona, where he performed locally. Keith was buried in Evergreen Memorial Park in Tucson.
