= Molly and Tenbrooks =

"Molly and Tenbrooks", also known as "The Racehorse Song", is a traditional song of the late 19th century. One of the first recordings of the song was the Carver Boys' 1929 version called "Tim Brook". The song was recorded by Bill Monroe and His Blue Grass Boys on October 28, 1947, but not released until 1949. In 1948, The Stanley Brothers released a recording of it in the Blue Grass Boys' style, marking the first recorded adoption of the bluegrass style by a second band. The song was also recorded by Steve Gillette on his self-titled debut album in 1967 in the folk style and a very different adaptation, by Gillette and Linda Albertano. Their version was later recorded by the well-known Canadian folk duo Ian and Sylvia for their album, Play One More. Tom T. Hall recorded "Molly and Tenbrooks" with Bill Monroe contributing on his mandolin on July 13, 1976, for Hall's LP The Magnificent Music Machine, released in 1976.

== Song plot ==
The song deals with a match race between two champion horses. According to most song versions, Tenbrooks "ran all around The Midwest and beat the Memphis train," while "out in California Molly did as she pleased, came back to Kentucky and got beat with all ease."

== Historical facts ==
This song is a fictional account of the July 4, 1878 match race between the Kentucky horse Ten Broeck and the California mare Mollie McCarty at the Louisville Jockey Club (now Churchill Downs). Ten Broeck won the race before a record crowd of 30,000. The song commonly states that Ten Broeck "was a big bay horse", and although he was a bay, he was "very compactly built". The song refers to a fatal outcome, which did not in fact occur; Mollie McCarty lived nearly five more years, winning multiple races and producing three foals.

== See also ==
- Skewball is a topically related song, but it is melodically, lyrically, and historically distinct, although they have sometimes been conflated.
- Tenbrooks appears again later on Peter Rowan's Muleskinnner album, in the song "Blue Mule", in which the horse is pitted against a blue mule who is the child of Babe the Blue Ox.
