= Pee Wee Lambert =

American musician (1924–1965)

- Born: Darrell Lambert; August 5, 1924
- Died: June 15, 1965 (aged 40)
- Occupation: Musician
- Instruments: Mandolin, singing
- Formerly of: The Stanley Brothers

Pee Wee Lambert (born Darrell Lambert; August 5, 1924 – June 15, 1965) was a mandolinist who worked with The Stanley Brothers. He left the group in 1950. He sang in a "high voice" like Bill Monroe. He highly admired Monroe. In addition to singing like him, Lambert is said to have imitated Bill Monroe's posture, dress, and facial expressions. He also worked with Curly Parker as "Bluegrass Pardners".
