= George Shuffler =

- Born: April 11, 1925; Valdese, North Carolina, U.S.
- Died: April 7, 2014 (aged 88) Valdese, North Carolina, U.S.
- Genres: Bluegrass
- Occupation: Musician
- Instruments: Guitar, bass
- Years active: 1946–2014

George Shuffler (April 11, 1925 – April 7, 2014) was an American bluegrass guitar player and an early practitioner of the crosspicking style. During his career Shuffler played with The Bailey Brothers, The Stanley Brothers and Ralph Stanley's Clinch Mountain Boys. He was a 2007 recipient of the North Carolina Heritage Award and in 2011 was elected to the International Bluegrass Music Hall of Fame.

== Biography ==
=== Early years ===
George Shuffler was born in Valdese, North Carolina, United States, on April 11, 1925. As was the case with many southern musicians, Shuffler's first experience with music was when he attended shape note singing schools in Valdese. Shuffler's affinity for music grew and at age twelve his father traded an old broken-down car for a Kalamazoo guitar. There were very few guitars in North Carolina at that time, and Shuffler had only become interested in them through radio shows broadcast out of far-away cities like Cincinnati. Shuffler found out that one of his neighbors, Jack Smith, knew some chords on a guitar, and so he tracked him down. Smith showed him three chords, G, C, and D. Shuffler went home that night practicing the three chords over and over, afraid that he would forget them. When he got home his mother was singing an old song called "Birmingham Jail", and Shuffler started accompanying her, encouraging her to sing until she was hoarse.

Over the next few months Shuffler practiced his three chords, and made up others whenever he needed them. Another of Shuffler's neighbors had a guitar and invited him to come pick with him. At first, Shuffler was afraid, thinking that his homemade chords would make him look foolish, but he soon discovered that they were the same shapes his more experienced neighbor was making. Emboldened by this experience, Shuffler practiced in his spare time, and soon learned to play the bass as well. When his father traded the guitar for a new pistol, Shuffler went out and purchased a new one with his carefully saved money.

=== Musical career ===
Over time Shuffler began to develop a reputation as a good guitar and bass player. He played the guitar in the fashion of Merle Travis (Travis picking) and Maybelle Carter (Carter Family picking), the two most popular country music guitarists. Shuffler played in local talent shows, and played and sang in local churches. One night, right after the end of World War II, Shuffler went to Granite Falls to see the Bailey Brothers, and when their backup band did not show, he volunteered to play bass for them. Danny and Charlie Bailey were so impressed by his playing that when their bass player did show up, they let him go in favor of Shuffler. They offered him sixty dollars a week to come with them to Nashville to play on the Grand Ole Opry radio show. Since this was double the pay he was making at the mill for better work, Shuffler immediately accepted.

Over the next few years Shuffler played with different groups all over North Carolina and Tennessee, then in 1950 Shuffler was contacted by Carter Stanley about playing in a group with himself and his brother Ralph. For the next eighteen years Shuffler played on and off as a member of the Stanley Brothers, and of the Stanleys' other band, the Clinch Mountain Boys. Now regarded as one of the earliest and most important bluegrass bands, times were not always easy for the young musicians. One year, money was so tight that Ralph Stanley sold off his whole herd of cattle to keep the band going, and Shuffler quit the band on several occasions, only to be lured back by raises of fifteen or twenty dollars. During good times the band had many instruments, including a guitar and a banjo played by Carter and Ralph, Shuffler's guitar and occasional bass playing, a full-time bassist, mandolin player, and fiddler. During many of the lean times the band was composed of just Ralph and Carter Stanley, and George Shuffler. This sparse playing arrangement led to the development of George Shuffler's now famous crosspicking style.

=== Later years and death ===
Shuffler eventually quit the music business "for good", and when his wife Sue expressed her incredulity at the idea, he sold all of his instruments to prove he was really done. A few years later he heard his daughters sing a gospel song at church, and as he had grown increasingly religious since leaving bluegrass, he decided to form a family gospel band. He released a few gospel albums, and had a big hit "When I Receive My Robe and Crown", which stayed on the gospel charts for eleven months. Shuffler died on April 7, 2014, five days before his 89th birthday.

== Musical style ==
"It was just out of necessity," was how George Shuffler described the birth of crosspicking. When Ralph and Carter played their slow songs there were long pauses at the end of every line, during which they would be catching their breath for the next line. During these pauses Shuffler had to take every break, and at the time the only two guitar styles were the Carter scratch and Travis picking. Travis style could keep the rhythm, but sounded repetitive during breaks, while scratch style could play lead but lost the rhythm. Shuffler created a style that allowed him to keep the rhythm and play a lead melody at the same time. This style was crosspicking, the guitar equivalent of a banjo roll. In the style the player used a flat pick to play three or more strings in sequence, which mixed a basic melody with fill notes to provide rhythm (two strokes down and one up). This created a flurry of eighth notes which perfectly filled the breaks, and allowed Shuffler to keep the rhythm with the melody. This style has since become one of the most important guitar styles in bluegrass, as important in the genre as flamenco is to Spanish guitar, or shuffles are to early rock and roll. While in early bluegrass the guitar was regarded as a novelty item, almost every modern bluegrass band has a lead guitar player.

== Discography ==
- Various Albums
- With the Stanley Brothers

== See also ==
- The Stanley Brothers
- Ralph Stanley
- Bluegrass music
- Crosspicking
- Flatpicking
