= WZAP =

- Bristol, Virginia; United States
- Broadcast area: Tri-Cities
- Frequency: 690 kHz
- Branding: WZAP 690AM/93.3FM

Programming
- Format: Christian radio

Ownership
- Owner: Glen & Rita Harlow; (RGH Communications Inc.)

History
- First air date: December 13, 1946
- Former call signs: WCYB (1946–1970)

Technical information
- Licensing authority: FCC
- Facility ID: 55004
- Class: D
- Power: 10,000 watts (day); 14 watts (night)
- Transmitter coordinates: 36°37′51.5″N 82°09′32.8″W
- Translator: 93.3 W227DT (Bristol)

Links
- Public license information: Public file; LMS
- Website: 933wzap.com

WZAP is a religious formatted broadcast radio station licensed to Bristol, Virginia, serving the Tri-Cities area. WZAP is owned and operated by Glen & Rita Harlow, through licensee RGH Communications Inc.

== History ==
The station was founded by Appalachian Broadcasting, a consortium of local businessmen, and began broadcasting on December 13, 1946 under the call sign WCYB. The station's initial format was country music, including such notable acts as the Stanley Brothers. Appalachian Broadcasting signed on WCYB-TV in 1956. In 1969, Appalachian's owners decided to retire. The FCC had by this time barred common ownership of television and radio stations, so the radio station was sold to another local businessman, James Ayers, who changed the call letters to WZAP, effective December 23, 1970. Ayers died in 1975, and in 1976, his estate sold the station to general manager Al Morris and his company, RAM Communications. In 2017, RAM Communications sold the station to Chuck Lawson and Awaken Broadcasting, Inc. The current owner Glen & Rita Harlow, RGH Communications, Inc. received transfer of the license on December 30, 2020.

Prior to the dominance of FM radio, WZAP was the number one station in the Tri-Cities TN/VA market, playing country/western music with a personality-DJ format. The station switched to its current Southern gospel format in 1982.

Some key on-air personnel over the years included Glen Harlow, Dave Ray, Ray Hutchins, Greg Hutchins, and Ed Spiegel. WZAP's longtime chief engineer was John Faniola, who could often be heard testing the station's transmitter late into the overnight hours.

Effective December 30, 2020, Awaken Broadcasting Inc. sold WZAP to RGH Communications Inc.

== See also ==
- Allmusic.com entry for Live Again: WCYB Farm & Fun Time, a recording of live music broadcast from the station during the late 1940s and early 1950s
