= James "Chick" Stripling =

American musician

James "Chick" Stripling (1916–1970) was a fiddler, comedian, and buck dancer from 1938 to 1966.

== Early life ==
James ‘Chick’ Stripling was born in Tifton, Georgia, on March 4, 1916. Chick started working fiddle contests, square dances and random radio shows in the early part of his career. Gene Stripling (no relation) hired Chick on the spot in 1939 to work at Atlanta's radio station WSB for the “Barn Dance Show.” Chick worked there for the better part of 8 years and was one of the most popular fiddler/comedians to be heard in Atlanta.

== Career ==
Stripling would periodically leave the “Barn Dance Show” to tour with Bill Monroe, and by 1958 he asked Jim and Jesse McRynolds if he could start working on the WVOP Valdosta radio show. He was also known to work with Flatt and Scruggs, toured with Ernest Tubb and played the fiddle for Johnny Carson at political rallies in the 1946 race for governor in Georgia. Chick also played the bass fiddle for Jimmy Martin and the Stanley Brothers in 1962. One of his last jobs was in 1966, playing with the New River Boys as a comedian.

Stripling died November 19, 1970, in Virginia.
