= Vernon Crawford "Jack" Cooke =

American bluegrass musician (1936–2009)

- Born: Vernon Crawford Cooke; December 6, 1936; Norton, Virginia, U.S.
- Died: December 1, 2009 (aged 72) Norton, Virginia, U.S.
- Genres: Bluegrass
- Occupation: Musician
- Instruments: Bass, vocals, guitar
- Years active: 1955–2009

Vernon Crawford "Jack" Cooke (December 6, 1936 – December 1, 2009) was a bluegrass music vocalist and instrumentalist, known for playing the guitar and bass with artists such as Bill Monroe and Ralph Stanley and the Clinch Mountain Boys. He was one of nine siblings (four brothers and four sisters) and was a native of Norton, Virginia.

Cooke was a cousin to old-time musician Dock Boggs, and Cooke's father also played clawhammer banjo. He began playing guitar as a teenager and performed with his brothers and fiddler Kenny Baker as the Cooke Brothers before joining Carter and Ralph Stanley on bass. From 1955 to 1957, he worked with the brother duo on the radio show Farm and Fun Time on WCYB in Bristol, Tennessee. In 1958, he joined Bill Monroe's band, playing off and on for a period of four years. During his stint as a Blue Grass Boy, he played both guitar and bass although his main instrument was guitar.

After leaving Bill Monroe, he formed his own group, the Virginia Mountain Boys, including Del McCoury on banjo. In 1970, Cooke joined Ralph Stanley and the Clinch Mountain Boys when he was re-offered a bass playing job after running into Stanley at a Norton, Virginia flea market.

Cooke worked regularly as a member of Stanley's band until 2009, when he stopped performing on the road due to health problems. In 2002, he shared a Grammy for his work on Stanley's Lost in the Lonesome Pines project. During his tenure with the Clinch Mountain Boys, he released one solo album, Sittin' On Top Of The World, in 2007.

He served half a term as mayor of Norton, Virginia during 1963.

In 2003, he received the International Bluegrass Music Association (IBMA) Distinguished Achievement Award.

On December 1, 2009, Cooke collapsed at his home in Norton, Virginia, after suffering a massive heart attack, at the age of 72. He was pronounced dead at a hospital.

== Discography ==
- Volume 1 (Recorded Live In 1971) (with Ralph Stanley, Ricky Skaggs, Keith Whitley, and Curly Ray Cline) (Stanley Tone Records C-4538, September 1971)
- Sittin' On Top Of The World (Pinecastle Records PRC1157, 2007)
