= Carter Stanley =

American singer-songwriter (1925–1966)

- Born: Carter Glen Stanley; August 27, 1925; Big Spraddle Creek, Virginia, United States
- Died: December 1, 1966 (aged 41) Bristol, Tennessee, United States
- Genres: Bluegrass, Old-time
- Occupations: Guitarist, singer, songwriter
- Instrument: Guitar
- Years active: 1946–1966
- Labels: Rich-R-Tone, Columbia, Mercury, Starday, King
- Formerly of: The Stanley Brothers

Carter Glen Stanley (August 27, 1925 – December 1, 1966) was a bluegrass music lead singer, songwriter, and rhythm guitar player. He formed The Stanley Brothers and The Clinch Mountain Boys band with his younger brother Ralph Stanley.

The Stanley Brothers were inducted into the Country Music Hall of Fame in 2026.

== Biography ==
Stanley was born in Big Spraddle Creek in Dickenson County, Virginia. The son of Lucy and Lee Stanley, Carter grew up in rural southwestern Virginia. In 1946, he and his brother Ralph formed the Stanley Brothers, ultimately becoming one of the most respected and influential pioneering groups of a new genre that later came to be known as "bluegrass". Carter played guitar and sang lead while Ralph played banjo and sang with a strong, high tenor voice. Their harmonies are much admired, and many consider Carter Stanley to be one of the great natural singers in the history of country music. Carter also composed more than 100 songs, and many of them remain standards in the bluegrass genre. He had a particular knack for deceptively simple lyrics that portrayed strong emotion. His famous compositions include "White Dove" and "The Fields Have Turned Brown." His arrangement of "Man of Constant Sorrow" was popularized in the 2000 film O Brother, Where Art Thou? (some of his songs were published under the pseudonym "Ruby Rakes").

The brothers broke up in 1951, and Carter Stanley briefly played guitar with Bill Monroe and the Bluegrass Boys. In 1953, he and Ralph reunited. After that time, the Stanley Brothers stayed together as a brother act until October 21, 1966 when Carter began hemorrhaging during a performance at a school auditorium in Hazel Green, Kentucky, and had to leave the stage. He died six weeks later on December 1, 1966. A heavy drinker, Carter died from cirrhosis at age 41. He was buried in accordance with his request on Smith Ridge, near Coeburn, Virginia.

In 1992 Carter Stanley was inducted posthumously into the International Bluegrass Music Hall of Honor.

== Publication ==
In 2013, a biography was released Lonesome Melodies: The Lives and Music of the Stanley Brothers by David W. Johnson.
