= West Virginia Music Hall of Fame =

Non-profit organisation in USA

Coordinates: 38.3430°N 81.6242°W

The nonprofit West Virginia Music Hall of Fame was established in 2005, to honor the legacies of the state's performing artists in multiple music genres. This hall of fame is the brainchild of its founder, musician Michael Lipton, who was inspired by a visit to the Country Music Hall of Fame and Museum in Nashville, Tennessee. The first exhibit was records from his personal collection.

The organization is staffed and governed by volunteers, and also offers their Music Career Counseling Program. Nominations for artist inclusion into the hall are currently submitted by the public, but the first class of inductees was selected by the hall of fame's board members. Criteria for selection is primarily the nominee's cultural impact on state and national levels. They must either have residency, or place of birth, in West Virginia. The first ten honorees inducted were the class of 2007, and all six of the then-living inductees made a personal appearance at the ceremony. The number of inductees varies by year, but so far have been fewer than the initial class.

Biennial festive induction ceremonies normally take place as a live event at the Culture Center Theater in Charleston, and are aired on television by West Virginia Public Broadcasting. During the 2020 COVID-19 crisis, that year's induction ceremonies were taped at Nashville, Los Angeles, and Bakersfield, California, and broadcast at a later date, as well as posted on the West Virginia PBS Facebook page. The Hall of Fame takes its traveling museum across the state, and works in tandem with the West Virginia Department of Education as part of a West Virginia music history curriculum for the state's elementary schools.

== Inductees ==
=== Class of 2007 ===
- Leon "Chu" Berry (1908–1941) Jazz tenor sax player.
- George Crumb (b. 1929) Composer of modern classical and avant-garde music.
- Hazel Dickens (1935–2011) Socially conscious Bluegrass singer-songwriter.
- Little Jimmy Dickens (1920–2015) King of the novelty song, the first country musician to tour the world. He was member of the Grand Ole Opry for 67 years.
- Johnnie Johnson (1924–2005) Self-taught Rock and Roll piano player, who played with Chuck Berry for two decades, later with many top Rock and Roll artists. Keith Richards brought him out of retirement in 1986.
- Clark Kessinger (1896–1975) Fiddle player.
- Molly O'Day (1923–1987) Columbia Records recording artist.
- Blind Alfred Reed (1880–1956) Musician, songwriter.
- Billy Edd Wheeler Songwriter, musician, visual artist. Composer of plays and musicals. Author of humor books and novels.
- Bill Withers (1938–2020) Singer, songwriter, musician.

=== Class of 2008 ===
- Ann Baker (1915–1999) Jazz vocalist.
- Stoney Cooper (1918–1977) and Wilma Lee Cooper (1921–2011).
- Phyllis Curtin (1921–2016) Operatic soprano, vocal instructor at Yale School of Music.
- Robert Drasnin (1927–2015) Clarinetist, film and television composer.
- The Lilly Brothers & Don Stover A collaboration of Bluegrass musicians Lilly Brothers, and banjo player Don Stover.
- Charlie McCoy Bluegrass and Country harmonica player. Inductee of the Country Music Hall of Fame and Museum.
- Maceo Pinkard (1897–1962) Lyricist and music publisher, who composed "Sweet Georgia Brown".
- Red Sovine (1917–1980) Country music vocalist and songwriter associated with truck-driving songs.
- Frankie Yankovic (1915–1998), Known as "America's Polka King".

=== Class of 2009 ===
- The Bailes Brothers

Homer Bailes (1922–2013)
Johnnie Bailes (1918–1989)
Walter Bailes (1920–2000)
Kyle O. Bailes (1915–1996)

Grand Ole Opry performers who also helped launch the Louisiana Hayride.

- Larry Combs, Grammy Awards winning orchestral clarinetist.
- Frank De Vol (1911–1999) Academy Award for Best Original Score nominated as music arranger and composer on Pillow Talk (1959), Hush...Hush, Sweet Charlotte (1964), Cat Ballou (1965), Guess Who's Coming to Dinner (1967).
- Hawkshaw Hawkins (1921–1963) Country music artist, member of the Grand Ole Opry.
- Don Redman (1900–1964) Jazz music band leader, arranger, composer, musician.
- Nat Reese (1924–2012) Blues singer.
- Doc Williams (1914–2011) and Chickie Williams (1919–2007).

=== Class of 2011 ===
- Billy Cox bass guitar player for Jimi Hendrix.
- Kathy Mattea Country music Bluegrass singer.
- Diamond Teeth Mary McClain (1902–2000) Blues, vaudeville, gospel.
- Butch Miles (Charles J. "Butch" Miles) jazz drummer. Drummer with the Count Basie Orchestra, Frank Sinatra, Ella Fitzgerald and numerous other bands and performers. Past president of the Austin Jazz Society Board of Directors.
- Walter E. "Jack" Rollins (1937–2003) Songwriter who wrote "Here Comes Peter Cottontail," and "Frosty the Snowman". Also wrote numerous songs for country artists.
- Connie Smith Vocalist and songwriter, member of the Grand Ole Opry.
- Tommy Thompson (1937–2003) Founder of the Hollow Rock String Band and the Red Clay Ramblers.

=== Class of 2013 ===
- The Goins Brothers – Melvin Goins (1933–2016) Ray Goins (1936–2007). Legendary Bluegrass musicians, who were part of the International Bluegrass Music Museum's oral history project.
- Claude Jeter gospel singer, and founder of the gospel group Swan Silvertones.
- Peter Marshall entered show business as a band singer. He appeared in numerous stage musicals, including 800 performances in La Cage aux Folles and a London production of Bye Bye Birdie. Also known as the Emmy Award-winning game show host.
- Wayne Moss songwriter, session guitarist, and proprietor of Cinderella Sound recording studio in Nashville.
- Tim O'Brien Grammy-winning bluegrass/country/folk artist.
- Ada "Bricktop" Smith (1914–1990) dancer, singer, vaudeville performer, nightclub owner.
- Eleanor Steber (1914–1990) operatic soprano, recording artist.

=== Class of 2015 ===
- John Ellison musician, vocalist, songwriter.
- Ed Haley (1885–1951) blind fiddle player.
- Russ Hicks pedal steel and dobro player.
- Buddy Starcher (1906–2001) recording artist and TV host.
- Bob Thompson jazz musician.
- Vann "Piano Man" Walls (1918–1999).

=== Class of 2018 ===
- Hasil Adkins (1937–2005) singer.
- The Morris Brothers, John and David, brother musicians who organized the first Morris Family Old-Time Musical Festival.
- Frank Hutchison (1897–1945) Blues musician.
- Ann Magnuson, all-around performer.
- Fred "Sonic" Smith (1948–1994) rock music guitarist.
- Michael W. Smith (born 1957) – Grammy Award-winning singer, songwriter, musician and actor.

=== Class of 2020 ===
- Ethel Caffie-Austin, West Virginia's "First Lady of Gospel Music".
- Larry Groce singer, songwriter, and radio host.
- The Davis Twins

Honey Davis (1926–2019) – Mandolin, vocals
Sonny Davis – Guitar, vocals, disc jockey

- Mayf Nutter songwriter, lead singer of The New Christy Minstrels.
- The Hammons Family

Edden Hammons, (1876–1995)
Pete Hammons, (1861–1955)
Maggie Hammons Parker, (1899–1987)
Sherman Hammons, (1903–1988)
Burl Hammons, (1907–1993)
Lee Hammons, (1883–1980)
Currence Hammons, (1898–1984)
Mintie Hammons, (1898–1987)
Dona Hammons Gum, (1900–1987)

=== Class of 2023 ===
- Buddy Griffin (1919–1981) member of The Griffin Brothers.
- Fuzzy Haskins (born 1941) musician, record producer
- Calvin Simon (1942-2022) founding member of Parliament-Funkadelic of Rock and Roll Hall Of Fame.
- Barbara Nissman (born 1944) classical pianist
- Lonesome Pine Fiddlers (1938-1966)
- Seminal bluegrass pioneers:

Ezra Cline
Charlie Cline
Curly Ray Cline
Larry Richardson
Bobby Osborne
Paul Williams
Jimmy Martin
Ray Morgan

- Winston Walls (1943-2008): Hammond B-3 organ player

=== Class of 2025 ===
- Jeff Stevens (born 1959) member of Jeff Stevens and the Bullets.
- The Valentinos

Friendly Womack Jr. (born 1941)
Curtis Womack (1942-2017)
Bobby Womack (1944-2014) founding member of The Womack Brothers of Rock and Roll Hall Of Fame.
Cecil Womack (September 25, 1947 – January 25, 2013)
Harry Womack (June 25, 1945 – March 9, 1974) Vocals, bass, Singer, musician, instrumentalist

- Daniel Johnston (1961-2019)
- Cameron LaVelle Mullins (1928-2001)
