= Andy Boarman =

- Also known as: The Banjo Man from Berkeley County
- Born: Andrew Forrest Boarman; October 11, 1911; Falling Waters, West Virginia, US
- Died: August 26, 1999 (aged 87) Hedgesville, West Virginia
- Genres: Bluegrass, folk, "old-time" banjo
- Occupations: Barber, instrument builder and repairman
- Instruments: Autoharp, 5-string banjo, "Dixie Grand" banjo
- Years active: 1929–1933; 1974–1999
- Label: June Appal Recordings
- Formerly of: The All Night Ramblers

Andrew Forrest Boarman (October 11, 1911 – August 26, 1999) was an American bluegrass and folk musician. He was also well known as a banjo designer, luthier and repairman. From 1962 to 1974, Boarman's Hedgesville barber shop, out of which he ran a music store and instrument workshop, was a popular hangout for musicians from throughout the Southeastern United States. He subsequently became a full-time musician in the mid-1970s, releasing his first album in 1978, and was a popular performer at state fairs and music festivals across West Virginia.

Boarman was praised for his "old-time" banjo performances, particularly for his "unusual and intricate finger-style" banjo playing, as well as being one of the oldest living pioneers of the autoharp. He frequently declined invitations from a number of musical groups to join them on national tours, preferring to remain in his native state. Consequently, Boarman remained unknown as a performer outside of West Virginia. Nevertheless, Boarman eventually gained national recognition being profiled by numerous publications including, most notably, Banjo Newsletter, Goldenseal, and Grit. Bluegrass Unlimited called Boarman "the guru of the 5-string banjo". He was also the subject of the 1987 documentary film Catching Up With Yesterday. In 1991, Boarman received the Vandalia Award for his "lifetime contribution to West Virginia and its traditional culture."

== Family background and early life ==
Andy Boarman was born on October 11, 1911, in Falling Waters, West Virginia, and spent much of his childhood in the "apple orchard country" of Berkeley County. At one point, his family lived along the Potomac River. He was one of five children born to Ada Lee Stump (1877–1922) and William McGary Boarman (1877–1959). The Boarmans, under patriarch Major William Boarman (1630–1709), were among the original families to settle in the Colony of Maryland. His great-grandfather Rear Admiral Charles Boarman (1795–1879) played a role in the succession of West Virginia and was later appointed to the U.S. Naval Board during the American Civil War. Two of Admiral Boarman's sons-in-law, however, served in the Confederate Army; according to Andy, a family story claimed that famed Confederate general Thomas J. "Stonewall" Jackson visited the Boarman farm near Little Georgetown during the war and "was treated to a glass of wine".

Boarman attributed his early exposure to music largely to his mother's family. Ada Lee Stump played clawhammer-style five-string banjo, upright bass, piano, and organ in a family band with three of Andy's uncles and two aunts. Boarman's brothers William and Tony played banjo and guitar respectively. Boarman's maternal uncle, Charles Cleveland "C.C." Stump, was a classical banjo player and the person from whom Andy learned to build banjos. Andy also credited his cousin Charles Boarman for introducing him to the autoharp, an instrument he would later become most associated with, as well as "a few pointers" from local Falling Waters musician Conley Hoover. Boarman claimed that Charles was one of the finest fiddlers in the country but was so shy that he would only play with his cousin.

== Musical beginnings and early career ==
When his mother died in 1922, Boarman was sent to live with C.C. and Minnie Stump. He left his aunt and uncle's home at around age 16 and spent the next several years working in construction. In his late teens, Boarman was encouraged by his Aunt Minnie to enter a banjo contest in Blacksburg, Virginia. Boarman came in first place and won three hundred dollars, a small fortune at the time, which he gave to his aunt and uncle. In 1929 and 1930, Boarman traveled with ukulele player Andy Jones and played the 5-string banjo and fiddle at square dances around Canowing and Peachbottom, Maryland. Together they worked 55 hours a week and after paying for room and board had $11 between them. They also played in the mountain communities. According to Boarman, there "wasn't much money floating around then" and the audience would take up collections for the musicians. Boarman received as much as $65 for one night's performance. Boarman soon left construction work and moved to Vinton, Virginia, to live with his uncle C.C. Stump. He learned the craft of building banjos and other instruments from his uncle. He also spent time with Hagerstown, Maryland, violin maker Art Velardo who influenced Boarman's later designs.

Boarman also continued learning how to play the 5-string banjo from Stump and "Fiddlin'" Arthur Smith. While living in Virginia, he had the opportunity to play with a number of string musicians including classical banjo players Fred Bacon and Fred Van Epps. Around this time, Boarman began performing in a band with several cousins called The All Night Ramblers with Boarman playing autoharp and old-time banjo. The group initially played for local barn and square dances traveling between gigs by "Model T, horse and buggy, or the 'shoe leather express'." Boarman later recalled walking in snow up to his knees while carrying his instruments to one square dance. In 1931, the band got a regular spot on the Potomac River dance boat The White Swan. They spent two years on The White Swan before it sank in late 1933.

In November of that year, Boarman married Lois Tyson of Sleepy Creek, West Virginia. The couple had five children together: Vincent, Forrest, Donald, Robert, and Beverly Boarman. In order to support his growing family, Boarman put his musical career on hold and went to work during height of the Great Depression. He walked three miles to work in local apple orchards where he earned 11 cents an hour. He later found employment in construction-related jobs as a carpenter, stonemason, and structural ironworker. For a period of time, he became a "journeyman rodsman" in Altoona, Pennsylvania, while his wife and family remained in West Virginia. From 1947 to 1958, Boarman worked at the Fairchild plant in Hagerstown, Maryland until suffering a heart attack. After his recovery, Boarman began cutting hair at a shop behind his home. After 20 years, Boarman returned to the music scene when bluegrass festivals began playing at Watermelon Park at the end of the decade.

== The Rolls-Royce of Repairmen ==
In addition to playing music, Boarman also started building, repairing and restoring instruments out of his Hedgesville barbershop. Bill Harrell once referred to Boarman as the "Rolls-Royce of repairmen". He was best known for his Dixie Grand banjos whose "intricate designs of pearl and abalone inlay are works of art in their own right". By the early-1960s, Boarman's modest shop had become popular with the local music community. The barbershop attracted many traditional and bluegrass musicians who were free to practice their music and listen to Boarman's "engaging stories". Among these included J.D. Crowe, Little Roy Lewis, Sonny Osborne, Don Reno, Darrell Sanders, Blaine Sprouse, and Jim Steptoe, as well as U.S. Senator Robert Byrd. The Southern Sounds of Grass were co-founded by Ron Amos and Boarman's future son-in-law Roger "Smokey" Dayley in his barbershop. At times, the barbershop became so crowded that as many as 26 customers had to sit outside. Boarman recalled a state health inspector making an unannounced visit:

There was [an] inspector from Charleston and I was outside. I had instruments strung all over the shop. I come out and locked the door and there he was. I knowed what he was. I says, 'I don't know whether to leave you in there or not.' He says, 'You have to leave me in.' I says, 'I tell you what I'm going to do. I'm going to take a shot at you. I'm going to let you in that door, but you're going to find the biggest surprise you ever found in barber inspecting.' He says, 'O.K.' I opened the door. He looked around and seen them music instruments. He says, I've found the one guy in West Virginia who wants to work. Just keep it up.'"

In 1971, Boarman's barbershop was featured in The Observer–Reporter which described the building process for his banjos. At the time of the article, Boarman's specialty "Dixie Grand" banjos were being sold at $1,000. Forty years later, they were selling for $3,500 as of 2013.

== The Banjo Man from Berkeley County ==
In 1974, Boarman closed his barbershop and began playing music full-time. He recorded "Somewhere in West Virginia" for a television segment with former reporter Carl Fleischhauer on Mountain Scene Tonight which aired on September 29 and October 3, 1975. Boarman recorded his first album, Mountain State Music (1978), which featured traditional banjo playing on one side and autoharp on the other. Dick Kimmel and a Bluegrass band provided backup music on several tracks. It was favorably reviewed by a critic for Bluegrass Unlimited who found the banjo portion "particularly satisfying" but was less enthusiastic about the autoharp music. Author Becky Blackley, however, praised Boarman's "unique and distinctive" autoharp recordings. His was profiled by Goldenseal in 1979 and Banjo Newsletter in 1984 and 1987. He was also the subject of the 1987 documentary film Catching Up With Yesterday. With the participation of Dr. William E. Lightfoot of Appalachian State University, the documentary presented Boarman's life as "an active bearer of folk traditions". It also featured segments demonstrating Boarman's unique style of banjo and autoharp playing as well as the building process of his hand-made Dixie Grand banjos.

Boarman was a regular performer at bluegrass and music festivals during the next three decades. Oftentimes, the headliners invited Boarman to personally play for them on their tour buses. In 1988, Boarman was invited to participate in a special Augusta Heritage Center apprenticeship program at Davis & Elkins College. Boarman's music was among the "twenty-five pieces of indigenous Appalachian folk music" used for Fair and Tender Ladies, a theatrical version of Lee Smith's award-winning novel, when it premiered on Broadway in October 1990. The following year, Boarman was presented with the Vandalia Award by the state of West Virginia at the 1991 Vandalia Gathering for his contributions to traditional Appalachian folk music and culture. That summer, the July 1991 edition of Autoharp Clearinghouse was dedicated to Boarman in honor of his then upcoming 80th birthday. Boarman continued performing and was active in the local music scene up until his death on August 26, 1999.

== Boarman's instruments ==
Boarman was considered a highly skilled luthier and crafter of string instruments during his lifetime. He began building musical instruments with his uncle, Charles Cleveland "C.C." Stump, in 1928. He was also influenced Hagerstown, Maryland, violin maker Art Velardo. Boarman mostly worked on fiddles and banjos. The construction of his banjos was described in 1971:

A specially designed bell metal tone ring is used along with the best quality wood. [...] Boarman uses maple and mahogany to form the body of his banjos, while the backs are of mahogany. The necks are walnut, overlaid with ebony to form the keyboard. Rosewood, a heavy, dense wood often used in expensive furniture, lines the banjo's inner box to give it a clearer tone. When the banjo body is finished, Boarman uses dentist tools to inlay intricate designs of abalone and mother of pearl. After a clear shellac is applied, the banjo is ready for a man with music in his fingers.

Many notable bluegrass musicians, such as J.D. Crowe, Little Roy Lewis, and Sonny Osborne, visited Boarman's barbershop for repairs or to purchase one of his instruments. Boarman was perhaps best known for his "Dixie Grand" resonator banjo which "some players considered the best-made instruments of their kind in the world". Boarman's instruments were valued at thousands of dollars during his lifetime; one of his "Dixie Grand" banjos was selling for $3,500 As of 2013. Music reviewer Frankie Revell described the instrument as "the best banjo I've ever played or had in my hands".

== Legacy ==
Boarman is considered an important and influential figure in folk music history. Dr. Ivan Tribe, assistant history professor at Rio Grande College, called Boarman "the most noted" of several prominent banjo and bluegrass musicians to come out of West Virginia's Eastern Panhandle. For much of his musical career, Boarman was dedicated to the preservation of Appalachian folk music and culture. He was encouraged to record Mountain State Music in order to preserve historical autoharp and banjo music for future generations. In 1978, Bluegrass Unlimited called the album "an interesting record and an important addition to the growing list of recordings of pre-bluegrass fingerpicking styles." The Kentucky Folklore Society also noted "the importance of [Boarman's] banjo playing, and the notes that describe Mr. Boarman's uncle, C. C. Stump, and his influence, lies in their showing the penetration of classic banjo style and repertoire into the realm of traditional music, a phenomenon not very well documented." Boarman was portrayed as "an active bearer of folk traditions" the 1987 documentary Catching Up With Yesterday. In 1991, Boarman was given the Vandalia Award by the West Virginia Division of Culture and History for "his lifetime contribution to West Virginia and its traditional culture."

Boarman has been called "the Guru of the 5-string Banjo" and was held in high esteem by many banjo players. Jimmy Arnold's first album, "Simply Jimmy" (1974), included a tribute to Boarman entitled "Boarman's Way". Best known for his "unusual and intricate finger-style" banjo playing, Boarman played "an old-time banjo in a folk style akin to the classic pickers of the turn of the century." Lloyd Longacre, a classical banjo player, described Boarman's style on the five-string banjo as a "blending of early classical banjo and folk music of his youth with the bluegrass music of today." Prior to his death, Boarman was one of the oldest living pioneers of the autoharp:

[Boarman] is also part of a dwindling number of musicians (other than the "schoolroom strummers") that still play with the instrument lying flat on a table. To carry it a step further, Andy plays below the chord bar assembly because he prefers the sound that results from the stronger string tension in that area. When he performed on stage, Andy would rest the autoharp on a barrel (55 gallon metal oil drum, to be exact) perforated with sound holes to further enhance the tone of the instrument.

His contributions were recognized at the 22nd annual Mountain Laurel Autoharp Gathering in Newport, Pennsylvania, where Boarman was posthumously inducted into The Autoharp Hall of Fame on June 21, 2012.

Boarman inspired four generations of bluegrass and folk musicians. Jeff Chestnut of The Ramblers cited Boarman as a major influence and praised him as "a true West Virginian legend". Boarman also privately taught aspiring musicians at his barbershop. As a result of his teaching, Boarman has exerted considerable influence on bluegrass and folk music in West Virginia. Among his most successful pupils were banjo player Jim Steptoe, a founding member of Patent Pending, and Darrell Sanders, a former member of Bill Harrell and The Virginians.

== Discography ==
=== Albums ===
==== Studio albums ====
Year	Album details	Peak chart positions									Certifications (sales threshold)
Year	Album details	UK	US	CAN	JPN	GER	AUS	SWE	NZ	SWI	Certifications (sales threshold)
1978	Mountain State Music: Released: 1978; Label: June Appal Recordings	—	—	—	—	—	—	—	—	—	

=== Singles ===
Year	Single	Peak chart positions									Album
Year	Single	UK	US	US Dance	CAN	JPN	GER	AUS	ITA	NL	Album
1978	"Dancin' Waves Schottische"	—	—	—	—	—	—	—	—	—	Mountain State Music
1978	"Home Sweet Home"	—	—	—	—	—	—	—	—	—	Mountain State Music
1978	"Yes Sir, She's My Baby"	—	—	—	—	—	—	—	—	—	Mountain State Music
1978	"Whoa Mule, Whoa"	—	—	—	—	—	—	—	—	—	Mountain State Music
1978	"Buffalo Gals"	—	—	—	—	—	—	—	—	—	Mountain State Music
1978	"Soldier's Joy"	—	—	—	—	—	—	—	—	—	Mountain State Music
1978	"Darktown Dandies"	—	—	—	—	—	—	—	—	—	Mountain State Music
1978	"Turkey In The Straw"	—	—	—	—	—	—	—	—	—	Mountain State Music
1978	"Somewheres In West Virginia"	—	—	—	—	—	—	—	—	—	Mountain State Music
1978	"When They Ring Those Golden Bells"	—	—	—	—	—	—	—	—	—	Mountain State Music
1978	"Derby Polka"	—	—	—	—	—	—	—	—	—	Mountain State Music
1978	"Medley"	—	—	—	—	—	—	—	—	—	Mountain State Music
1978	"Smile Awhile"	—	—	—	—	—	—	—	—	—	Mountain State Music
1978	"Wreck of the Old 97"	—	—	—	—	—	—	—	—	—	Mountain State Music
1978	"Clinch Mountain Backstep"	—	—	—	—	—	—	—	—	—	Mountain State Music
1978	"Don't Let Your Deal Go Down"	—	—	—	—	—	—	—	—	—	Mountain State Music
1978	"Darlin' Nellie Gray"	—	—	—	—	—	—	—	—	—	Mountain State Music
1978	"San Antonio Rose"	—	—	—	—	—	—	—	—	—	Mountain State Music
1978	"Wildflower of the Mountain"	—	—	—	—	—	—	—	—	—	Mountain State Music
