= List of stage names: W =

This list of stage names lists names used by those in the entertainment industry, alphabetically by their stage name's surname (or the best approximation) followed by the given name (or the best approximation) where the surname begins with "W". One-word stage names are presented in List of one-word stage names.

Stage name	Birth name	Life	Notability	Notes
Michael Wager	Emanuel Weisgal	1925–2011	American actor	
Tomisaburo Wakayama	Masaru Okumura	1929–1992	Japanese actor	
Gregory Walcott	Bernard Wasdon Mattox	1928–2015	American actor	
Wally Wales	Floyd Taliaferro Alderson	1895–1980	American actor	Also known as Hal Taliaferro
Christopher Walken	Ronald Walken	1943–	American actor	
Betty Walker	Edith Seeman	1928–1982	American actress and comedian	
Gary Walker	Gary Leeds	1942–2026	American musician (The Walker Brothers)	
Jerry Jeff Walker	Ronald Clyde Crosby	1942–2020	American singer-songwriter	
John Walker	John Joseph Maus	1943–2011	American musician (The Walker Brothers)	
Johnny Walker	Badruddin Jamaluddin Kazi	1924?–2003	Indian actor	
Junior Walker	Autry DeWalt Mixon Jr.	1931–1995	American musician	
Nancy Walker	Anna Myrtle Swoyer	1922–1992	American actress and comedienne	
Scott Walker	Noel Scott Engel	1943–2019	American-English singer-songwriter and record producer (The Walker Brothers)	
Paul Wall	Paul Michael Slayton	1981–	American rapper	
Beryl Wallace	Beatrice Heischuber	1912–1948	American actress	
Dee Wallace	Deanna Lee Bowers	1948–	American actress	Also known as Dee Wallace Stone
Jean Wallace	Jean Walasek	1923–1990	American actress	
Hal B. Wallis	Aaron Blum Wolowicz	1898–1986	American film producer	
Ruth Wallis	Ruth Shirley Wohl	1920–2007	American singer	
Bruno Walter	Bruno Schlesinger	1876–1962	German conductor, composer and pianist	
Little Walter	Marion Walter Jacobs	1930–1968	American blues musician, singer and songwriter	
Walter Wanger	Walter Feuchtwanger	1894–1968	American film producer	
Burt Ward	Bert John Gervis Jr.	1945–	American actor	
Fannie Ward	Fannie Buchanan	1872–1952	American actress	
Maitland Ward	Ashley Maitland Welkos	1977–	American actress and model	
Harlan Warde	Harlan Ward Lufkin	1917–1980	American actor	
Jack Warden	John Warden Lebzelter Jr.	1920–2006	American actor	
Irene Ware	Irene Catherine Ahlberg	1910–1993	American actress	
Andy Warhol	Andrew Warhola Jr.	1928–1987	American visual artist, film director and producer	
Derek Waring	Derek Barton-Chapple	1927–2007	English actor	
Jack Warner	Horace John Waters	1895–1981	English actor	
Alex Warren	Alexander Warren Hughes	2000–	American singer-songwriter	
Fran Warren	Frances Wolfe	1926–2013	American singer	
Harry Warren	Salvatore Antonio Guaragna	1893–1981	American composer	
Rusty Warren	Ilene Goldman	1930–2021	American comedienne and singer	
Dee Dee Warwick	Delia Juanita Warrick	1942–2008	American singer	
Dionne Warwick	Marie Dionne Warrick	1940–	American singer	
Giulia Warwick	Julia Ehrenberg	1857–1904	English opera singer	
Robert Warwick	Robert Taylor Bien	1878–1961	American actor	
David Was	David Jay Weiss	Unknown	American musician (Was (Not Was))	
Don Was	Don Edward Fagenson	1952–	American musician (Was (Not Was))	
Dinah Washington	Ruth Lee Jones	1924–1963	American singer	
Gio Washington	Governor Washington Jr.	1983–	American singer	Also known as Country Boy, Gentleman G and Governor
Muddy Waters	McKinley Morganfield	1913–1983	American musician	
Andrew Watt	Andrew Wotman	1990–	American record producer and singer-songwriter	
Dodo Watts	Dorothy Margaret Watts	1910–1990	British actress	
Fee Waybill	John Waldo Waybill	1950–	American musician (The Tubes)	
Kristina Wayborn	Britt-Inger Johansson	1950–	Swedish actress	
Alvis Wayne	Alvis Wayne Samford	1937–2013	American singer	
David Wayne	Wayne James McMeekan	1914–1995	American actor	
Ethan Wayne	John Ethan Morrison	1962–	American actor and stuntman	
Fredd Wayne	Frederick Searle Wiener	1924–2018	American actor	
John Wayne	Marion Robert Morrison	1907–1979	American actor	
Johnny Wayne	Louis Weingarten	1918–1990	Canadian comedian	
Lil Wayne	Dwayne Michael Carter Jr.	1982–	American rapper	
Michael Wayne	Michael Anthony Morrison	1934–2003	American actor and film producer	
Naunton Wayne	Henry Wayne Davies	1901–1970	Welsh actor	
Patrick Wayne	Patrick John Morrison	1939–	American actor	
Blue Weaver	Derek John Weaver	1947–	Welsh musician	
Clifton Webb	Webb Parmelee Hollenbeck	1889–1966	American actor, singer and dancer	
Laurie Webb	Lawrence Melvin Henry Webb	1924–2026	Welsh actor	
Raquel Welch	Jo Raquel Tejada	1940–2023	American actress	
Joan Weldon	Joan Louise Welton	1930–2021	American actress	
Brandi Wells	Marguerite J. Pinder	1955–2003	American singer	
Cory Wells	Emil Lewandowski	1941–2015	American singer (Three Dog Night)	
Doris Wells	Doris María Buonafina	1943–1988	Venezuelan actress	
Kitty Wells	Ellen Muriel Deason	1919–2012	American singer	
Robert Wells	Robert Levinson	1922–1998	American songwriter	
Bill Wendell	William Joseph Wenzel Jr.	1924–1999	American television announcer	
Robin Wentworth	Victor Roy Wheeler	1915–1997	British television actor	
Oskar Werner	Oskar Josef Bschließmayer	1922–1984	Austrian actor	
Paul Wesley	Paweł Tomasz Wasilewski	1982–	American actor and director	
Adam West	William West Anderson	1928–2017	American actor	
Billy West	William Richard Werstine	1952–	American voice actor	
Dottie West	Dorothy Marie Marsh	1932–1991	American singer and songwriter	
Keith West	Keith Hopkins	1944–	British singer, songwriter and music producer	
Maura West	Maura Jo Snyder	1972–	American actress	
Shane West	Shannon Bruce Snaith	1978–	American actor	
Gordon Westcott	Myrthus Hansen Hickman	1903–1935	American actor	
Helen Westcott	Myrthas Helen Hickman	1928–1998	American actress	After her father (see Gordon Westcott, immediately above)
Jack Weston	Morris Weinstein	1924–1996	American actor	
Paul Weston	Paul Wetstein	1912–1996	American musician, conductor and composer	
Peetie Wheatstraw	William Bunch	1902–1941	American musician	
Jay Wheeler	José Ángel López Martínez	1994–	Puerto Rican singer and songwriter	
Jack White	Jacob Weiss	1897–1984	Hungarian-born American film producer, director and writer	Brother of Jules White
Jack White	John Anthony Gillis	1975	American musician (The White Stripes)	
Jesse White	Jesse Marc Weidenfeld	1917–1997	American actor	
Jules White	Julius Weiss	1900–1985	Hungarian-born American film director and producer	Brother of Jack White
Joan Whitney	Zoe Parenteau	1914–1990	American singer and songwriter	
Peter Whitney	Peter King Engle	1916–1972	American actor	
Ryan Whitney	Ryan Whitney Newman	1998–	American actress	
Betty Who	Jessica Anne Newham	1991–	Australian musician	
Mary Wickes	Mary Isabella Wickenhauser	1910–1995	American actress	
Biff Wiff	Gary Crotty	1948–2025	American actor	
Bruce Wightman	Bruce Wightman McCombe	1925–2009	New Zealand actor	
Mary Wigman	Karoline Sophie Marie Wiegmann	1886–1973	German dancer and choreographer	
Cornel Wilde	Kornél Lajos Weisz	1912–1989	Slovakia-born Hungarian-American actor and director	
Gabriella Wilde	Gabriella Anstruther-Gough-Calthorpe	1989–	English actress and model	
Kim Wilde	Kim Smith	1960–	English singer	
Marty Wilde	Reginald Leonard Smith	1939–	English singer-songwriter	
Olivia Wilde	Olivia Jane Cockburn	1984–	American actress	
Ricky Wilde	Ricki Steven Reginald Smith	1961–	English songwriter, musician and record producer	
Gene Wilder	Jerome Silberman	1933–2016	American actor	
Adam Williams	Adam William Berg	1922–2006	American actor	
Anson Williams	Anson William Heimlich	1949–	American actor and director	
Bill Williams	Herman August Wilhelm Katt	1915–1992	American actor	
Cara Williams	Bernice Kamiat	1925–2021	American actress	
Chickie Williams	Jessie Wanda Crupe	1919–2007	American country musician	
Doc Williams	Andrew John Smik Jr.	1914–2011	American bandleader and singer	
Guy Williams	Armando Joseph Catalano	1924–1989	American actor	
Jerry Williams	Erik Sven Fernström	1942–2018	Swedish singer and actor	
Joe Williams	Joseph Goreed	1918–1999	American singer	
Katt Williams	Micah Sierra Williams	1971–	American stand-up comedian and actor	
Paul Williams	Paul William Yarlett	1940–2019	English singer and musician	
Roger Williams	Louis Jacob Weertz	1924–2011	American musician	
Kate Williamson	Robina Jane Sparks	1931–2013	American actress	
Sonny Boy Williamson I	John Lee Curtis Williamson	1914–1948	American musician, singer and songwriter	
Sonny Boy Williamson II	Aleck Ford	1912–1965	American musician, singer and songwriter	Also known as Rice Miller, Little Boy Blue and Little Willie
Boxcar Willie	Lecil Travis Martin	1931–1999	American singer-songwriter	
Mark Wills	Daryl Mark Williams	1973–	American country musician	
Eva Wilma	Eva Wilma Riefle	1933–2021	Brazilian actress and dancer	
Kevin Bloody Wilson	Dennis Bryant	1947–	Australian musical comedian	
Meri Wilson	Meri Wilson Edgmon	1949–2002	American singer	
Rebel Wilson	Melanie Elizabeth Bownds	1980–	Australian actress and comedienne	
Trey Wilson	Donald Yearnsley Wilson III	1948–1989	American character actor	
Paul Winchell	Paul Wilchinsky	1922–2005	American comedian, voice actor, ventriloquist and inventor	
Beatrice Winde	Beatrice Lucille Williams	1924–2004	American actress	
Barbara Windsor	Barbara Ann Deeks	1937–2020	English actress	
Claire Windsor	Clara Viola Cronk	1892–1972	American actress	
Frank Windsor	Frank Windsor Higgins	1928–2020	English actor	
Marie Windsor	Emily Marie Bertelson	1919–2000	American actress	
Red Wing	Lilian Margaret St. Cyr	1884–1974	American actress	
Paula Winslowe	Winifred Reyleche	1910–1996	American actress	
Norma Winstone	Norma Ann Short	1941–	English jazz singer and lyricist	
Ariel Winter	Ariel Winter Workman	1998–	American actress	
Judy Winter	Beate Richard	1944–	German actress	
David Winters	David Weizer	1939–2019	English-American dancer, director and actor	
Marian Winters	Marian Weinstein	1920–1978	American dramatist and actress	
Eileen Winterton	Eileen Rosa Windridge	1903–2004	English actress	
Estelle Winwood	Estelle Ruth Goodwin	1883–1984	American actress	
Nicky Wire	Nicholas Allen Jones	1969–	Welsh musician and songwriter (Manic Street Preachers)	
Ernie Wise	Ernest Wiseman	1925–1999	English comedian and actor (Morecambe and Wise)	
John Witty	Rupert John Blanchflower Featherstone-Witty	1915–1990	English actor	
Andrew W.K.	Andrew Fetterly Wilkes-Krier	1979–	American singer, musician, songwriter and record producer	
Jah Wobble	John Joseph Wardle	1958–	English musician (Public Image Ltd)	
Howlin' Wolf	Chester Arthur Burnett	1910–1976	American musician	
Karl Wolf	Carl Abou Samah	1979–	Lebanese-Canadian musician	
Peter Wolf	Peter Walter Blankfield	1946–	American musician and singer (The J. Geils Band)	Also known as Woofa Goofa
Stevie Wonder	Stevland Hardaway Judkins	1950–	American musician	
Anna May Wong	Wong Liu Tsong	1905–1961	Chinese-American actress	
Casanova Wong	Kim Yong-ho	1945–	South Korean actor	
Vincent Wong	Vivian Warren Chen	1928–2015	British-Chinese actor	
Jessie Woo	Jessica Juste	1990–	Haitian-American and Canadian comedian, musician and social media personality	Also known as Jessica Fyre
John Woo	Wu Yu-seng	1946–	Hong Kong filmmaker	
Brenton Wood	Alfred Jesse Smith	1941–2025	American singer and songwriter	
Judith Wood	Helen Johnson	1906–2002	American actress	
Lana Wood	Svetlana Lisa Gurdin	1946–	American actress	
Natalie Wood	Natalie Zacharenko	1938–1981	American actress	
Woody Woodbury	Robert Dennis Woodbury	1924–	American comedian and actor	
Donald Woods	Ralph Lewis Zink	1906–1998	Canadian-American actor	
Eli Woods	John Casey	1923–2014	English comedian and actor	
Ali-Ollie Woodson	Ollie Creggett	1951–2010	American musician	
Jimmy Wopo	Travon DaShawn Frank Smart	1997–2018	American rapper	
Hawksley Workman	Ryan Corrigan	1975–	Canadian musician	
Harry Worth	Harry Bourlon Illingsworth	1917–1989	English actor	
Helen Worth	Catherine Helen Wigglesworth	1951–	English actress	
Irene Worth	Harriett Elizabeth Abrams	1916–2002	American actress	
Bow Wow	Shad Gregory Moss	1987–	American rapper and actor	Also known as Lil' Bow Wow and Kid Gangsta
John Wray	John Griffith Malloy	1887–1940	American character actor	
Tera Wray	Tera Elizabeth Lents	1982–2016	American pornographic actress	
Betty Wright	Bessie Regina Norris	1953–2020	American singer	
Dale Wright	Harlan Dale Riffe	1938–2007	American singer	
Martha Wright	Martha Lucile Wiederrecht	1923–2016	American actress and singer	
Margaret Wycherly	Margaret De Wolfe	1881–1956	English actress	
Gretchen Wyler	Gretchen Patricia Wienecke	1932–2007	American actress and dancer	
Bill Wyman	William George Perks	1936–	English musician (The Rolling Stones)	
Patrick Wymark	Patrick Carl Cheeseman	1926–1970	English actor	
Charles Wyndham	Charles Culverwell	1837–1919	English actor	
Victoria Wyndham	Victoria Camargo	1945–	American actress	
Tammy Wynette	Virginia Wynette Pugh	1942–1998	American country singer	
Peter Wyngarde	Cyril Goldbert	1926 or 1927–2018	English actor	
Ed Wynn	Isaiah Edwin Leopold	1886–1966	American actor and comedian	
May Wynn	Donna Lee Hickey	1928–2021	American actress and singer	
Nan Wynn	Masha Vatz	1915–1971	American actress and singer	
Philippé Wynne	Phillip Walker	1941–1984	American singer (The Spinners)	Also known as Soul Walker Wynne
Diana Wynyard	Dorothy Isobel Cox	1906–1964	English actress	
El Gran Wyoming	José Miguel Monzón Navarro	1955–	Spanish comedian, musician, writer and TV presenter	
Lil Wyte	Patrick Dhane Lanshaw	1982–	American rapper	Also known as Boss Wyte
