= Aunt Jennie Wilson =

American traditional clawhammer banjo player

- Born: February 9, 1900; Henlawson
- Died: March 2, 1992 (aged 92); Logan
- Occupation: Musician, singer, banjoist

Virginia Myrtle Ellis "Aunt Jennie" Wilson (February 9, 1900 – March 2, 1992) was a traditional clawhammer banjo player from Logan County, West Virginia.

== Life and music ==
Aunt Jennie Wilson was born on February 9, 1900, near Henlawson, West Virginia. She was the youngest of eleven children of Hugh Bryant "Doc" Ellis and Cinderella Lockhard Ellis, who owned a farm overlooking present-day Chief Logan State Park. She began playing the banjo at age nine, learning from her brother's boyfriend Delpha Maynard. She also began signing, learning child ballads and other traditional songs. She played at square dances and other events, sometimes playing with musicians like Frank Hutchison and Dick Justice who would later become famous. Decades later, she described her first square dance: "I never seen such fightin' in all the days of my life...Knives a-flashing everywhere and people – men and women – fightin'"

In 1918 she married James Dewey Wilson, a coal miner. She gave up the banjo for a life of hard domestic labor in coal mining camps which were at the center of the West Virginia coal wars of the 1910s and 20s. In 1939, J. D. Wilson was paralyzed by a slate fall and lingered in a hospital, with financial support from the United Mine Workers, for three months before he died.

In the 1950s there was an increase in interest about traditional Appalachian music. After not performing for over three decades, she played for a class held by Dr. Patrick Gainer of West Virginia University. From there, she became a fixture of folk festivals and her music was recorded by Fred Coon in the 1960s, Billy Edd Wheeler in 1965, and Ray Alden and Dave Spialkia in 1972. From these recordings came the albums Aunt Jenny Wilson: Recordings from the Collection of Fred Coon and Billy Edd Wheeler presents A Portrait of Aunt Jennie Wilson. She also appeared on the television show Real People.

Aunt Jennie Wilson died at Logan General Hospital in Logan, West Virginia on March 2, 1992.

== Awards and honors ==
She received the Vandalia Award, a lifetime achievement award for contributions to West Virginia culture, in 1984. The annual Aunt Jennie Music Festival at Chief Logan State Park is named for her.
