= Vandalia Gathering =

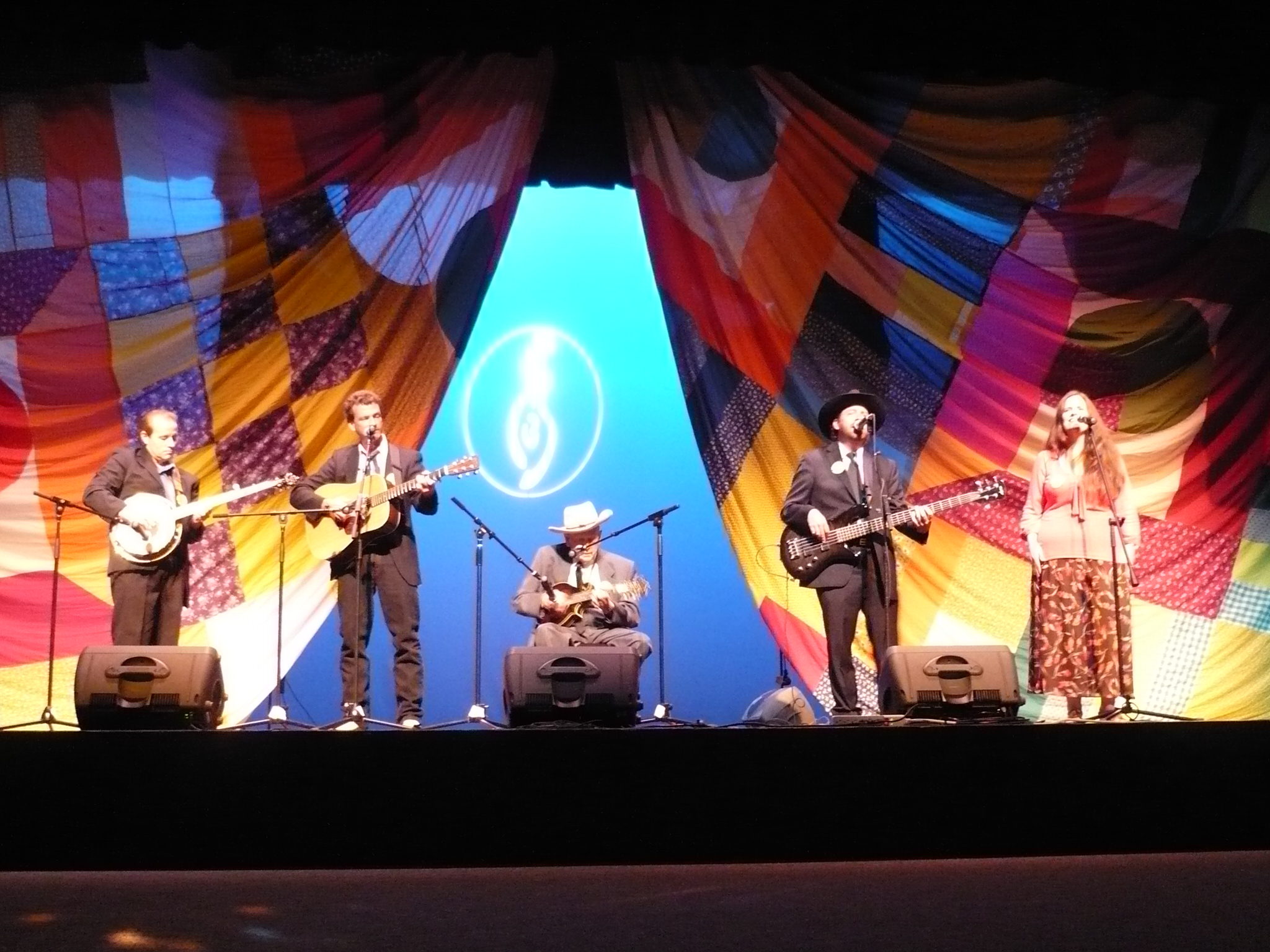
- Everett Lilly and the Lilly Mountaineers performing at the 2009 Vandalia Gathering
- Genre: Bluegrass music, Old-time music
- Dates: Memorial Day weekend in May
- Locations: Charleston, West Virginia, United States
- Years active: 1977–2019, 2021–
- Website: Official site

The Vandalia Gathering is a popular festival devoted to old-time and bluegrass music, as well as related arts such as dance, quilt making, and cooking, which takes place each summer on the state capitol grounds in Charleston, West Virginia, United States. It was established in 1977. It is held on Memorial Day weekend in May. The festival features solo competitions, whose winners are awarded cash prizes.

Performers at the festival have included Lester McCumbers, Dwight Diller, Ginny Hawker and Tracy Schwarz, and Everett Lilly and the Lilly Mountaineers.

There was no gathering in 2020 as officials cited the COVID-19 pandemic as grounds for cancellation.

== Vandalia Award ==
The Vandalia Award is an honor given by the West Virginia Department of Arts, Culture and History to recognize individuals "for their lifetime contribution to West Virginia and its traditional culture." The annual Vandalia Award ceremony occurs at the start of summer and typically on Memorial Day weekend, and held at the Normal L. Fagan State Theater at the West Virginia Culture Center in Charleston.

Year	Winner(s)	Ref(s)
1981	Melvin Wine	
1982	Ira Mullins	
1983	Woody Simmons	
1984	Aunt Jennie Wilson	
1985	Mike Humphreys	
1986	Russell Fluharty	
1987	Phoeba Parsons	
1988	Ernie Carpenter	
1989	Sylvia O'Brien	
1990	Bonnie Collins	
1991	Andy Boarman	
1992	Wilson Douglas	
1993	Jane George	
1994	Frank George	
1995	Nat Reese	
1996	Elmer Bird	
1997	Lefty Shafer	
1998	Glen Smith	
1999	Rush and Ruby Butcher	
2000	Brooks Smith	
2001	Norman Fagan	
2002	Bob Kessinger	
2003	Mack Samples	
2004	Carl Rutherford	
2005	Lester McCumbers	
2006	Ethel Caffie-Austin	
2007	Patty Looman	
2008	Lou Maiuri	
2009	Everett Lilly	
2010	Bobby Taylor	
2011	Buddy Griffin	
2012	The Bing Brothers	
2013	Gerald Milnes	
2014	Roger Bryant	
2015	Ken Sullivan	
2016	Joni Hoffman	
2017	Jim Good	
2018	Bil Lepp	
2019	Dwight Diller	
2020	W. I. "Bill" Hairston	
2020	Ron Stollings	
2021	Patricia Cowdery	
2021	Augusta Heritage Center	
2022	Mountain Stage	
2022	Goldenseal (magazine)	
2023	Stan Bumgardner	
2024	Ginny Hawker	

== See also ==
- List of bluegrass music festivals
