= Waterfront Blues Festival =

Annual event in Portland, Oregon, US

Coordinates: 45.516°N 122.6726°W

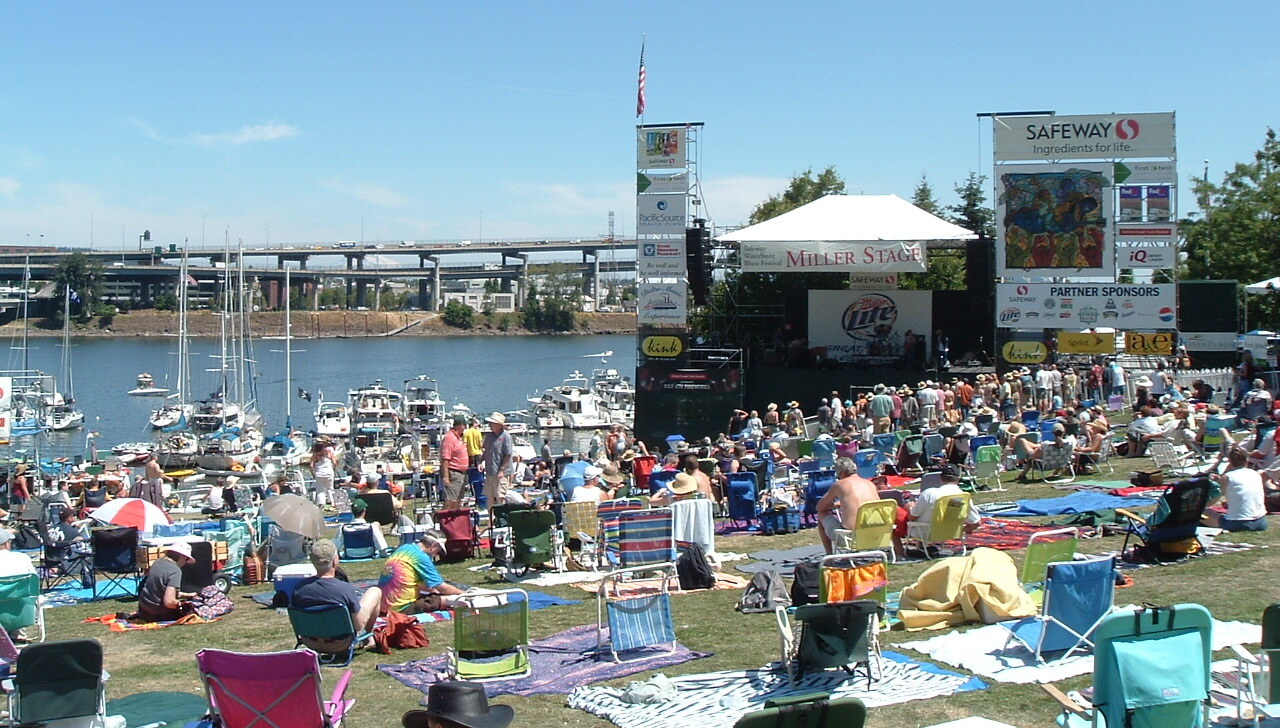
- The festival's main stage in 2007
- Frequency: Annually
- Locations: Tom McCall Waterfront Park; Zidell Yards (2021)
- Inaugurated: 1988
- Most recent: 2025
- Participants: 17,000 (2025)
- Website: waterfrontbluesfest.com

The Waterfront Blues Festival is an annual event in Portland, Oregon, United States, featuring four days of performances by blues musicians. The festival takes place in Tom McCall Waterfront Park, along the west bank of the Willamette River in downtown Portland.

== History ==
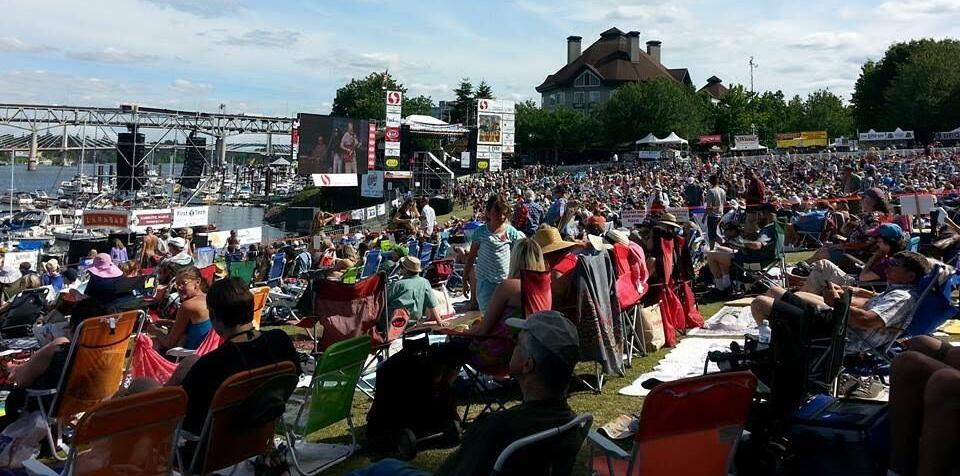
Waterfront Blues Festival south main stage

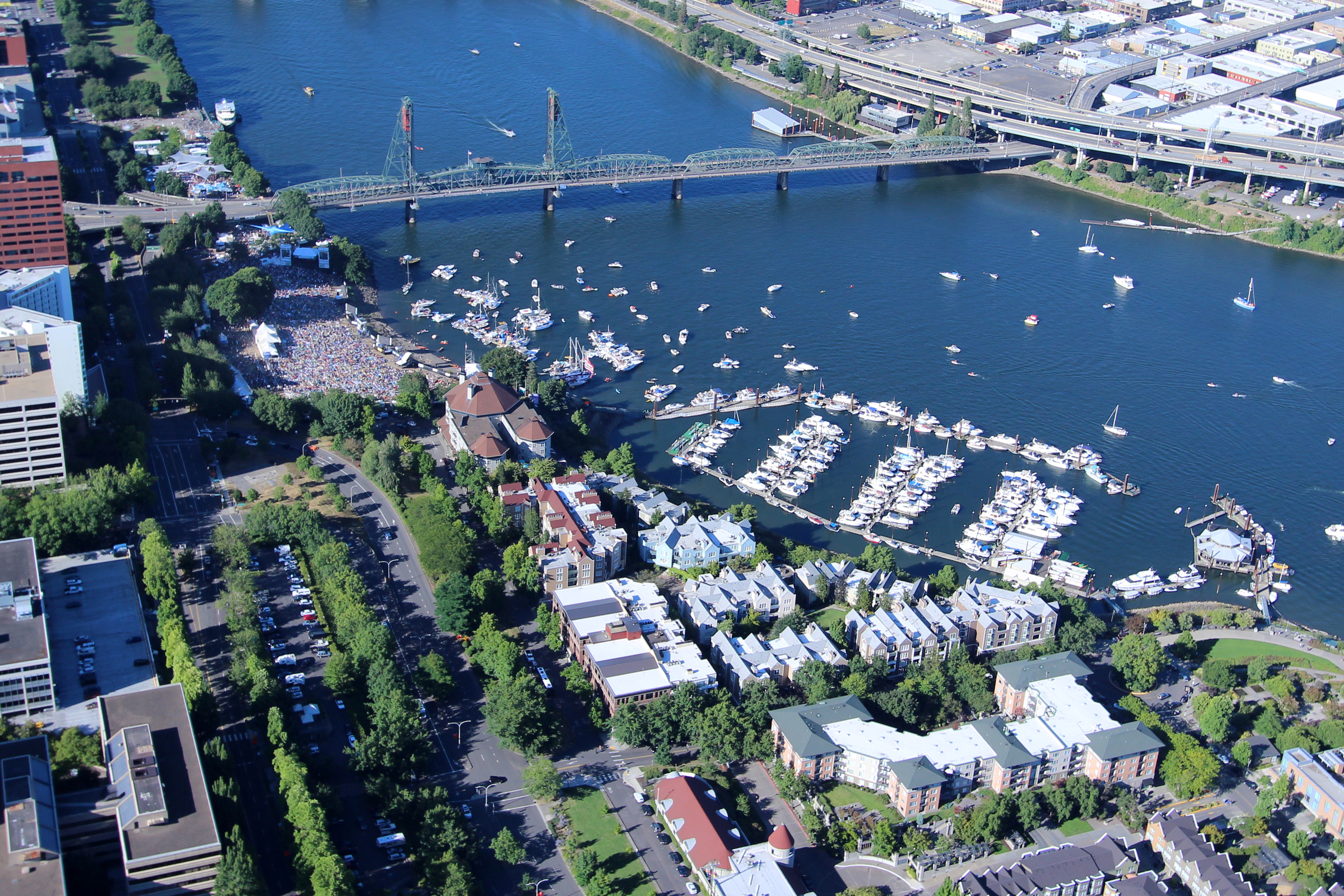
Aerial view of the 2016 festival

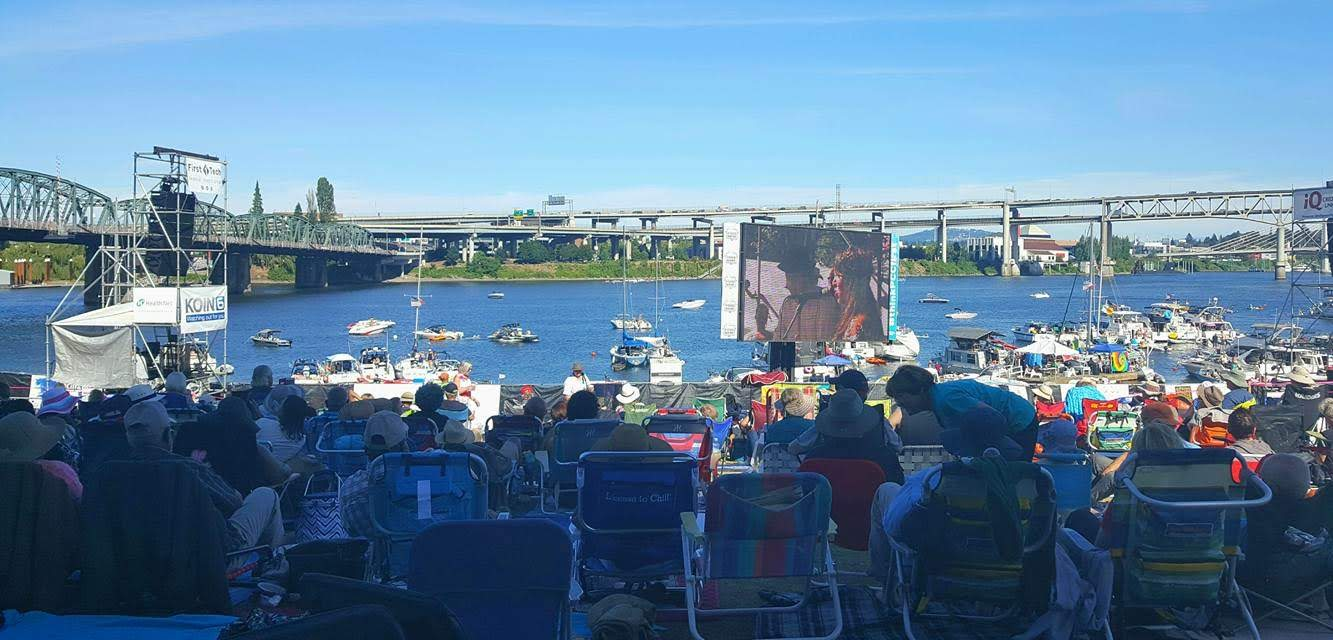
Waterfront main seating area

The event was established as the Rose City Blues Festival in 1988. It later became known as the Safeway Waterfront Blues Festival.

Approximately 50,000 people attended the 1991 event. Tickets were required for admission starting in 2016.

The 2020 event was cancelled because of the COVID-19 pandemic. Subsequently festivals were shortened to save costs. The 2021 event was held at Zidell Yards. Approximately 17,000 people attended the two-day festival in 2025. Event organizers said the 2026 festival will span three days.

Every year there is a new poster for the Waterfront Blues Festival. The artist is Gary Houston, who has been making the iconic poster art for the festival for eighteen years.

=== Food donations ===
Collecting food donations has always been a part of the event. In 1988, the festival raised $7,500 and 650 pounds of canned food donations for the Oregon Food Share. The 2013 event raised $1.3 million and approximately 78,000 pounds of food. In the festival's first 27 years, approximately $10 million and 800 tons of food were donated to the food bank.

=== Musicians ===
Robert Plant headlined in 2013. The following year, Gregg Allman was scheduled to headline, but was hospitalized a few days before and forced to cancel; Curtis Salgado replaced him.

Taj Mahal & the Phantom Blues Band, The Wood Brothers, Galactic, Femi Kuti & the Positive Force, Lettuce, and the War and Treaty were part of the 2022 lineup. The 2023 lineup included C.J. Chenier, Rick Estrin, Eric Gales, Buddy Guy, Los Lonely Boys, and Cory Wong. Ben Harper & The Innocent Criminals headlined the 2024 event.

== Reception ==
The event was a runner-up in the Best Music Festival category of Willamette Week's annual 'Best of Portland' readers' poll in 2017. It ranked second and was a finalist in the same category in 2024 and 2025, respectively.

== See also ==
- Culture of Portland, Oregon
- Folk festivals in the United States
- List of blues festivals
- List of festivals in the United States
  - List of music festivals in the United States
- Mt. Hood Jazz Festival
