= Ethel Caffie-Austin =

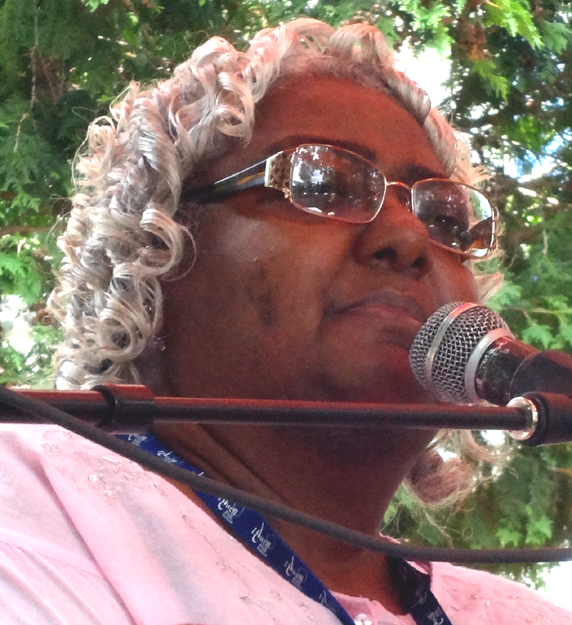
- Caffie-Austin performing at the Lowell Folk Festival in 2012

Background information
- Born: Ethel Caffie; February 11, 1949; Bluefield, West Virginia, U.S.
- Died: December 11, 2024 (aged 75) Charleston, West Virginia, U.S.
- Genres: Gospel; folk
- Occupations: Musician; singer; teacher
- Instruments: Piano, voice
- Years active: 1958–2024

Ethel Caffie-Austin (née Caffie; February 11, 1949 – December 11, 2024) was an American gospel musician. Known for her skills as a pianist and vocalist, she was dubbed the "First Lady of West Virginia Gospel Music". In 2020, she was inducted into the West Virginia Music Hall of Fame.

== Early life ==
Ethel Caffie was born on February 11, 1949, in Bluefield, West Virginia, and raised near Mount Hope, West Virginia. She began playing piano at the age of six and began playing at her father's church at the age of nine. She graduated from Mount Hope High School in 1967. She was a graduate of West Virginia University Institute of Technology, earning a Bachelor of Arts degree in Language Arts. She formed the Collegiate Gospel Choir at West Virginia Tech in 1967.

== Career ==
Caffie taught English studies in West Virginia public schools for 20 years. In 1971, Caffie and her musical group performed at the Federal Prison Camp, Alderson (then named Federal Reformatory for Women). After hearing the performance, the warden of the prison, Virginia McLaughlin, soon hired Caffie-Austin as an intern to teach both gospel and secular music in the prison.

She was the founder, lead singer and pianist of the Ethel Caffie-Austin Singers. She toured worldwide, performing numerous festivals and concerts.

In the 1990s, known as Ethel Caffie-Austin, she performed at the John F. Kennedy Center for the Performing Arts. She made several appearances on NPR's Mountain Stage and at the Vandalia Gathering in Charleston, where she was awarded the Vandalia Award in 2006 by the West Virginia Department of Arts, Culture & History.

Caffie-Austin recorded two songs for The Harry Smith Connection: A Live Tribute to the Anthology of American Folk Music (1998). She recorded her own DVD titled Learn to Play Gospel Piano (2003), an instructional video released by Homespun Video. Caffie-Austin was the subject of a 1999 documentary film titled "His Eye is on the Sparrow," for Kentucky Educational Television (KET) and a 1997 edition of Goldenseal magazine titled "Hand-Clapping and Hallelujahs: A Visit with Ethel Caffie-Austin.”

She was nominated in 2019 to be inducted into the West Virginia Music Hall of Fame and was inducted during a televised ceremony on November 14, 2020, during which she also performed.

== Personal life and death ==
Ethel Caffie married James Austin in 1982. He died from an enlarged heart in 1989. She died on December 11, 2024 in Charleston, West Virginia, at the age of 75.

== Discography ==
=== Albums ===
Title	Details	References
Harry Smith Connection	Release Date: 1997	
Gospel Live from Mountain Stage	Release date: 1998	

=== Single releases ===
Title	Details	References
"I'm on the Battlefield for My Lord"	Release Date: 1998	
"John the Revelator"	Release date: 1998	
"Up Above My Head"	Release date: 1997	
