= Dilfer =

Dilfer is a surname. Notable people with the surname include:

- Tori Dilfer (born 1999), American volleyball player, daughter of Trent
- Trent Dilfer (born 1972), American football coach and former player

== See also ==
- Diller (disambiguation)
