= Ernie Carpenter =

- Born: Ernest O. Carpenter; April 10, 1907; Sutton, West Virginia, US
- Died: January 23, 1997 (aged 89)
- Genres: Old-time music
- Instrument: Fiddle
- Years active: c. 1925–1997

Ernest O. Carpenter, (April 10, 1907, at Sutton, West Virginia – January 23, 1997), was an American fiddle player, 1988 winner of the Vandalia Award, West Virginia's highest folklife honor, at the annual Vandalia Gathering. He is interred near Sutton, West Virginia.
