= Larry Richardson =

Larry Richardson (August 9, 1927- June 17, 2007) was an American bluegrass and old time banjoist and guitarist from Galax, Virginia. He is known for his work with the Lonesome Pine Fiddlers, Bill Monroe and His Bluegrass Boys, and the Blue Ridge Boys.

Larry Richardson began his bluegrass career with the Lonesome Pine Fiddlers alongside mandolin player Bobby Osborne of Osborne Brothers fame. These two musicians are credited for transforming the band from western swing to bluegrass music in 1949. Larry and Bobby left the band after only a year and were replaced by Jimmy and Paul Williams. After Larry's brief time with the Lonesome Pine Fiddlers, he joined Bill Monroe as a banjo player from 1950 to 1951. He never made a recording as a "Bluegrass Boy". Larry then went on to work for Carl and J.P. Sauceman who ran a bluegrass show on WREN (AM).

In 1956, Larry was featured on a record that changed the way many people hear and play the banjo. "American Banjo Scruggs Style" which showcased the many banjo players who had adopted Earl Scruggs' famous "three finger roll" style of picking. On the record, Richardson played a rousing and inventive version of "Little Maggie" that influenced any number of up-and-coming banjo players in the late 1950s. Soon after the release of this record, Larry relocated to Low Gap, North Carolina. From the mid-1950s to the mid-1960s Larry recorded with the Blue Ridge Boys who focused on a traditional bluegrass sound.

In the latter 30 years of his life, Larry became an evangelist and spent the rest of his life preaching and singing bluegrass gospel. He lived in Lake Butler, Florida until he died of colon cancer.
