= Nat Reese =

Former West Virginia blues music artist

- Born: March 4, 1924; Salem, Virginia, US
- Died: June 8, 2012 (aged 88) Princeton, West Virginia, US
- Genre: Blues

Nat Reese was an American blues singer, guitarist, and folk musician associated with the traditional acoustic blues and gospel traditions of Appalachia. Reese was inducted into the West Virginia Music Hall of Fame in 2009.

== Early life ==
Nat Reese was born in Salem, Virginia, in 1924. When he was a child, his family moved to Princeton, West Virginia, where he was raised primarily in coal and railroad camps in Wyoming and Mercer counties.

Reese's parents were both musicians. His mother played accordion and performed gospel music, while his father played guitar, blending Southern blues and gospel with Piedmont fingerpicking styles. Through family gatherings, church services, and community events, Reese was immersed in gospel quartets, blues, spirituals, and early popular recordings from an early age.

Growing up in racially segregated but culturally interconnected coal camps, Reese witnessed and participated in a musical environment where Black and white musicians frequently played together in informal settings, despite broader social divisions.

== Career ==
His first instrument was a ukulele, which he purchased with earnings from delivering newspapers. He later transitioned to a tipple, a ten-string instrument related to the ukulele, which became central to his early performances. Reese gradually incorporated blues techniques alongside gospel repertoire, developing a style that bridged sacred and secular traditions.

As a teenager, Reese began performing publicly, including appearances at schools and churches. He sang in gospel quartets, mastering four-part harmony, and soon became a sought-after vocalist for church events across West Virginia, performing for both Black and white congregations. By his mid-teens, Reese was performing regularly on radio, appearing on stations including WJLS, WNNR, WLOH, and WHIS.

Reese became particularly known for his work in traditional acoustic blues, often performing with fiddler Howard Armstrong. Together, they toured extensively in the United States and Europe. Reese also performed alongside musicians including John Jackson and Cephas & Wiggins, contributing to the preservation and revival of pre-war blues styles.

== See also ==
- West Virginia Music Hall of Fame
- Appalachian music
- Piedmont blues
