= Diller =

Diller has several uses including:

== People with the surname ==
- Barry Diller (born 1942), American businessman
- Burgoyne Diller (1906–1965), American abstract painter
- Dwight Diller (1946–2023), American musician
- Karl Diller (born 1941), German politician
- Phyllis Diller (1917–2012), American comedian
- Na'aman Diller (d. 2004), Israeli thief who robbed the Museum for Islamic Art

== Other uses ==
- Killer Diller (2004 film), a drama film
- Killer Diller (1948 film), a musical film
- Diller, Nebraska
