= Ray Alden =

American singer-songwriter

- Born: July 2, 1942 (age 84)
- Died: September 19, 2009 (aged 67) Croton-on-Hudson, New York
- Genre: Old-time music
- Occupation: Musician
- Instrument: Banjo

Ray Alden (July 2, 1942 – September 19, 2009) was active in the old-time music community for nearly 40 years. He had taught at The Tennessee Banjo Institute, Augusta Folk Heritage Institute, Banjo Camp North, appeared in concerts, workshops, and on recordings. He was best known for his pioneering work recording traditional and second generation Appalachian banjo and fiddle players and styles, for which he received many awards, including a Grammy nomination. They include "Tommy And Fred - North Carolina Master Fiddle-Banjo Duets", "MountAiry USA", "The Young Fogies", and "The American Fogies". His publications include "Advanced Speaker Systems", "Music From Round Peak" and numerous articles and photographs.

Ray Alden was the founder of and frequent contributor to The Field Recorder's Collective, where he worked to record, preserve, and distribute traditional old-time Appalachain music. The University of North Carolina's Southern Folklife Collection includes Ray Alden's personal archive of over 12,000 items from the 1960s-2010s.

Earlier in life Ray worked as a counselor at Trywoodie Camp in Hyde Park, New York. He also taught mathematics at Stuyvesant High School in New York City for 25 years.

== Discography ==
Solo

- Old Time Friends (Marimac 9009, 1987)

With The Round Peak Band

- The Round Peak Band (Marimac 9044, 1992)

With various artists

- Ray's Dream: Ray Alden And Many Friends (Field Recorders' Collective FRC115, 2009) (banjo on 4 tracks)
