= Dick Kimmel =

American bluegrass musician (born 1947)

Dick (Richard) Kimmel (born February 21, 1947) is an American bluegrass/oldtime musician and biologist.

Kimmel performs solo, with his band, Dick Kimmel & Co, or with various musical collaborations. Kimmel generally performs as a vocalist playing guitar, mandolin, and clawhammer banjo.

Kimmel was inducted into America's Traditional Country and Bluegrass Hall of Fame in 2008, the Minnesota Music Hall of Fame in 2010, and the Mid-America Music Hall of Fame in 2012. In 2014, he was nominated as Bluegrass Entertainer of the Year by SPBGMA (the Society for the Preservation of the Bluegrass Music of America). Kimmel has played on more than 24 recordings, many containing songs he copyrighted.
