= WREN (AM) =

Radio station in Carrollton, Alabama

Carrollton, Alabama; United States
- Frequency: 590 kHz
- Branding: The Mighty 590

Programming
- Language: English
- Format: Defunct

Ownership
- Owner: Serendipity Ventures II, LLC

History
- First air date: August 1951
- Last air date: September 21, 2011
- Former call signs: WRAG (1951–2008)

Technical information
- Facility ID: 70262
- Class: D
- Power: 1,000 watts (day); 185 watts (night)
- Transmitter coordinates: 33°13′04″N 88°05′48″W

WREN (590 AM, "The Mighty 590") was an American radio station licensed to serve the community of Carrollton, Alabama, United States. The station began broadcasting in 1951 as "WRAG" and fell permanently dark in 2010 due to economic and other issues. The WREN broadcast license was cancelled by the Federal Communications Commission (FCC) in September 2011.

The station's license was last held by Serendipity Ventures II, LLC. Before falling silent, it had most recently broadcast a traditional Black Gospel music format branded as "The Mighty 590". Over the six decades of its operation, WRAG had also aired Top 40, country, and rhythm and blues music formats.

== History ==
=== Launch ===
The class D station was originally assigned the call letters WRAG by the FCC and began broadcasting in August 1951. The 1,000 watt daytime-only station was licensed to Pickens County Broadcasting, Inc., which was itself owned by Roth E. Hook and W.E. Farrar.

Carl Sauceman and his brother John Paul, also known as the Sauceman Brothers, were among the early pioneers of Bluegrass music. After performing at radio stations in North Carolina and Tennessee, Carl Sauceman brought his Green Valley Boys to WRAG in early 1952 for a decade-long run as the station's studio band. Sauceman was elevated to program director in 1954 then general manager of the station in 1955. The Green Valley Boys' broadcasts are credited with popularizing Bluegrass in central Alabama and eastern Mississippi.

=== WRAG era ===
In June 1990, after nearly 40 years of ownership, Pickens County Broadcasting Company, Inc., made a deal to sell WRAG to Vintage Broadcasting Corporation. The deal was approved by the FCC on August 7, 1990, and the transaction was consummated on October 1, 1990.

In May 1994, Vintage Broadcasting Corporation agreed to sell this station to Firststar Broadcasting Systems, Inc. The deal was approved by the FCC on August 3, 1994, but the transaction was not consummated and WRAG was placed back on the market. In September 1994, Vintage Broadcasting Corporation reached an agreement to sell this station to Grant Radio Group, LLC. The deal was approved by the FCC on December 14, 1994, and the transaction was consummated on February 15, 1995.

In July 1997, Grant Radio Group, LLC, contracted to sell this station to Willis Broadcasting subsidiary Birmingham Christian Radio, Inc. The deal was approved by the FCC on October 16, 1997, and the transaction was consummated on June 30, 1998.

In April 2006, Willis Broadcasting-owned Birmingham Christian Radio, Inc., reached an agreement to sell this station to Kingdom Radio of Chattanooga, LLC, as part of a two-station deal for a reported combined sale price of $200,000. The deal was approved by the FCC on June 5, 2006, and the transaction was consummated on August 2, 2006.

=== WREN era ===
In April 2008, Kingdom Radio of Chattanooga, LLC, agreed to sell this station to Serendipity Ventures II, LLC, based in Festus, Missouri. The deal was approved by the FCC on May 8, 2008, and the transaction was consummated on May 9, 2008. The new owners had the FCC assign this station the current call letters WREN on October 14, 2008. These historic call letters once belonged to a radio station in Topeka, Kansas.

== Falling silent ==
The station fell silent on September 29, 2008, and the licensee applied to the FCC for special temporary authority to remain silent for 180 days. The licensee cited "the current economic conditions in Pickens County, Alabama" and "some other personal family health issues" for the suspension of operations. They stated they expect to resume operations in "the Spring of 2009". The application was accepted for filing by the FCC but later dismissed when the station resumed broadcasting on May 28, 2009.

WREN fell silent again on July 16, 2009, and Serendipity Ventures again applied to the FCC for authority to remain off the air temporarily. The station's owners sought to "resolve the terms of a potential time brokerage agreement" and made the request "out of an abundance of caution". This time the Commission granted the request and on November 2, 2009, gave the station until May 2, 2010, to return to the air or ask for an extension. Citing "economic conditions" the station filed for the extension in January 2010 but this application was dismissed when the station resumed broadcasting on June 29, 2010.

Citing "staffing" and "continuing economic conditions", WREN's licensed holder took the station silent again on July 5, 2010. They again sought permission from the FCC to remain silent and this was granted on September 16, 2010. The special temporary authority was scheduled to expire on March 15, 2011. In March 2011, with the deadline fast approaching and family health and economic concerns unresolved, the station filed for an extension.

This time, however, the station did not return to the air within a year of falling silent. The license holder submitted a Notification of Suspension of Operations to the FCC on July 4, 2011, and formally submitted their license for cancellation in a letter dated September 14, 2011. Under the terms of the Telecommunications Act of 1996, as a matter of law a radio station's broadcast license is subject to automatic forfeiture and cancellation if they fail to broadcast for one full year. The FCC cancelled WREN's broadcast license on September 21, 2011.

=== WRAG Online era ===
In late February 2024, it is reported a new online station 590 WRAG is on air broadcasting gospel 24/7 to Pickens County covering Carrollton, Alabama and Aliceville, Alabama owned by Chris King Communications. The station is located at mighty590wrag.com. The online station will also pay tribute to the history of WRAG-AM as well.
