= Lonesome Pine Fiddlers =

American bluegrass band

The Lonesome Pine Fiddlers
- Origin: Bluefield, West Virginia, United States
- Genre: bluegrass
- Years active: 1938–1966
- Past members: Ezra Cline, Charlie Cline, Curly Ray Cline, Larry Richardson, Bobby Osborne, Paul Williams, Jimmy Martin, Ray Morgan, Melvin Goins

The Lonesome Pine Fiddlers (1938–1966) were an early bluegrass band. Throughout their formations, they included notable "first generation" bluegrass musicians such as Ezra Cline, Bobby Osborne, Paul Williams, Melvin Goins, Charlie Cline, Curly Ray Cline, and Larry Richardson. The Lonesome Pine Fiddlers were inducted into the International Bluegrass Music Association Hall of Fame in 2009.

== Career ==
The group was started by Ezra Cline and his cousins Ireland "Lazy Ned" Cline and Ray "Curly Ray" Cline. The group was originally named "Cousin Ezra and the Lonesome Pine Fiddlers". Ezra played the bass, Ireland the banjo, and Ray the fiddle. After Ireland was killed on D-Day, his other brother Charlie took his place in the band. The Clines came from a large and musically talented family. Ray and Charlie's father, Charlie, was a banjo player while the women in the family, Geraldine and Bobbi, were singers. For reasons unknown, Bobbi and Geraldine never joined the band on the road but often joined in at home, especially when notable Country singers, such as Bill Monroe, Lester Flatt and Earl Scruggs, and Hank Williams, came visiting. Natives of the Gilbert Creek region of southern West Virginia, the original Lonesome Pine Fiddlers worked on radio at WHIS Bluefield, West Virginia.

In 1949 the additions of vocalist Bobby Osborne and banjoist Larry Richardson made the Fiddlers into a bluegrass band. The group was first recorded in 1950, releasing a double-sided, shellac disk with the tracks "Don't Forget Me" and "Will I Meet Mother in Heaven" under label Cozy Records. At this time the band consisted of Ezra Cline, Larry Richardson, Ray Morgan, and Bobby Osborne. Throughout the remainder of their career, the Lonesome Pine Fiddlers would record 4 albums under Starday Records and many EPs under RCA Victor, Starday, and others.

When the Lonesome Pine Fiddlers resumed regular daily broadcasts, Charlie, who played multiple instruments, joined them on a regular basis. Charlie returned to the Fiddlers briefly before becoming a member of Bill Monroe's Blue Grass Boys. During 1952–1955, Charlie worked off and on with Monroe, recording some 38 songs, all on Decca. It has been said that he played every instrument at one time or another in the Monroe group except mandolin. Charlie spent most of 1953 back with the Lonesome Pine Fiddlers working at WJR radio in Detroit. When Ezra brought the band to Pikeville, Kentucky, in November, Charlie rejoined Bill Monroe. In 1954, Charlie played lead guitar on a session with the Stanley Brothers and one on RCA with the Fiddlers, even though he was not otherwise working with them at the time. He also worked briefly as a sideman with the Osborne Brothers. By 1958, Charlie (electric lead guitar) and his wife, Lee (electric bass), had rejoined Ezra and Curly Ray in the Lonesome Pine Fiddlers, who were experimenting with a more modern sound and working a TV show in Huntington, West Virginia, in addition to daily radio in Pikeville.

On October 1, 2009, the Lonesome Pine Fiddlers were inducted into the International Bluegrass Hall of Fame. Bobby Osborne, Melvin Goins, and Paul Williams received the band's award during a ceremony at the Ryman Auditorium (the original home of the Grand Ole Opry). A performance of The Lonesome Pine Fiddlers' tune "Pain In My Heart" by Osborne, Goins, and Williams was included in the closing act of the awards ceremony.

== Discography ==
Don't Forget Me / Will I Meet Mother in Heaven

- Released: 1950
- Label: Cozy Records

Pain in My Heart / Lonesome, Sad and Blue

- Released: 1950
- Label: Cozy Records

Pain in My Heart / Lonesome Sad and Blue

- Released: 1951
- Label: Coral

You Broke Your Promise / Nobody Cares (Not Even You)

- Released: 1952
- Label: RCA Victor

I'm Left Alone / Twenty-one Years

- Released: 1952
- Label: RCA Victor

My Brown Eyed Darling / I'll Never Make You Blue

- Released: 1953
- Label: RCA Victor

You Left Me to Cry / That's Why You Left Me So Blue

- Released: 1953
- Label: RCA Victor

Honky Tonk Blues / Dirty Dishes Blues

- Released: 1953
- Label: RCA Victor

Baby You're Cheatin' / Some Kinda Sorry

- Released: 1953
- Label: RCA Victor

Lonesome Pine Breakdown / Five String Rag

- Released: 1953
- Label: RCA Victor

Don't Forget Me / I'm Feeling For You

- Released: 1953
- Label: RCA Victor

You're No Good / I'll Never Change My Mind

- Released: 1954
- Label: RCA Victor

No Curb Service / A New Set of Rules

- Released: 1954
- Label: RCA Victor

Windy Mountain

- Released: 1954
- Label: RCA Victor

Lonesome Pine / Eatin' Out of Your Hand

- Released: 1961
- Label: Starday Records

Little Glass of Wine / Mountain Flower

- Released: 1962
- Label: Starday Records

Coal Dust Blues / Hello Mr. Banjo

- Released: 1963
- Label: Starday Records

Too Hot to Handle / I Walked to the River

- Released: Unknown
- Label: Starday Records

== Bibliography ==
- Rosenberg, Neil V. Bluegrass: A History. University of Illinois Press. 1985.
- Wright, John. Travelling the High Way Home: Ralph Stanley and the World of Traditional Bluegrass Music. University of Illinois Press. 1993.
