= Banjo Newsletter =

Monthly magazine devoted to the 5-string banjo

- Cover of Banjo Newsletter
- Editor: Donald Nitchie
- Categories: Bluegrass and Old-Time Banjo
- Frequency: monthly
- Founder: Hubbard and Nancy Nitchie
- Founded: 1973
- First issue: November 1973
- Company: Banjo Newsletter, Inc.
- Country: United States
- Based in: Annapolis Maryland
- Language: English
- Website: banjonews.com
- ISSN: 0190-1559

Banjo Newsletter (BNL) is a monthly magazine devoted to the 5-string banjo.

== Newsletter ==
Founded in 1973 by Hubbard "Hub" Nitchie and his wife Nancy, the magazine covers a range of banjo topics, including features on banjo players, banjo techniques (predominantly the three-finger or Scruggs style and the clawhammer playing style), beginning banjo, music theory, banjo set-up and accessories, product and record reviews. Banjo tablature is featured in each issue.

Since 1993, BNL has been published by its founder's sons Donald and Spencer, who serve as editor and business manager, respectively. As of 2011 the magazine had a circulation of approximately 6,800 copies.

The International Bluegrass Music Association (IBMA) awarded Hub Nitchie its Print Media Person of the Year award in 1992 and Banjo Newsletter its Distinguished Achievement Award in 2008.

On April 1, 2013, the Banjo Newsletter web site received a major overhaul. From that time, it included all of the articles and classified advertising published in each edition. Eventually all of the publication's back issues will be uploaded as well. The site now uses AJAX technology to produce uninterrupted playback of the audio files while browsing the site. To avoid bandwidth issues associated with hosting mp3 audio files, links to the sound files were replaced with interactive audio players. The newsletter's banjo tablature selections, previously available only in the print magazine, also were made available online, with the option to purchase each tab separately. An online subscription option was added to the range of subscription choices, and a paywall was implemented to limit non-subscribers to five articles per month.

In July 2013, the paywall was reduced to three articles per month, and the latest edition was made accessible to subscribers only.
