= Dwight Diller =

American musician

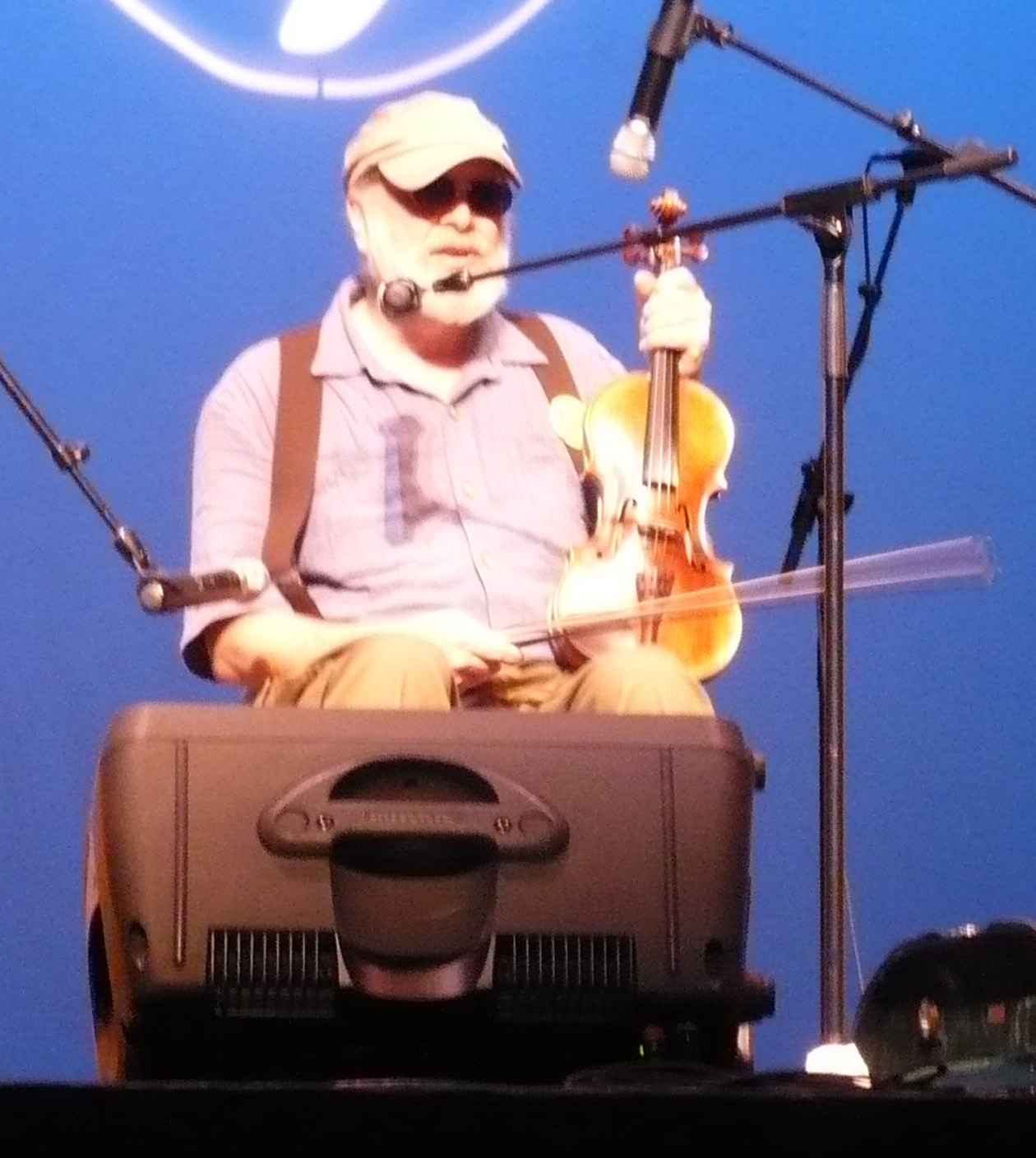
- Dwight Diller with fiddle, in 2009

Background information
- Born: August 17, 1946; West Virginia
- Died: 14 February 2023 (aged 76) Roanoke, Virginia
- Genres: old-time
- Occupation: American musician
- Instrument(s): Vocals, fiddle, banjo

Dwight Diller (August 17, 1946 – 14 February 2023) was an American banjo and fiddle player and teacher. He was considered one of the most prominent exponents of the clawhammer banjo tradition.

Diller lived in Hillsboro, West Virginia, and then Marlinton, and was an inheritor of the old-time music tradition of the Hammons Family of West Virginia. He conducted banjo workshops around the United States and in England. He released a number of recordings and instructional videos.

== Discography ==
- Hold On! (Yew Pine Music YP-001, 1989)
- Say Old Man (with Glen Smith) (Marimac Recordings AHS #3, 1990)
- O Death (Yew Pine Music YP-005, 1992)
- Red Rooster (Yew Pine Music YP-003, 1992)
- Just Banjo (Yew Pine Music YP-002, 1996)
- Harvest (Yew Pine Music, 1997)
- Just Banjo '99 - WVa Mountain Music (Yew Pine Mountain Music YP-99, 1999)
- Jericho Road (Not On Label, 2005)
- Trouble On Spring Creek (with Darin Gentry) (Not On Label FR#16, 2007)
- Piney Woods (with YewPine Cultural Traditions) (Yew Pine Music YP-007, 2015)
- Papa! (Yew Pine Music YP-1X)
