= Goldenseal (magazine) =

West Virginian quarterly magazine

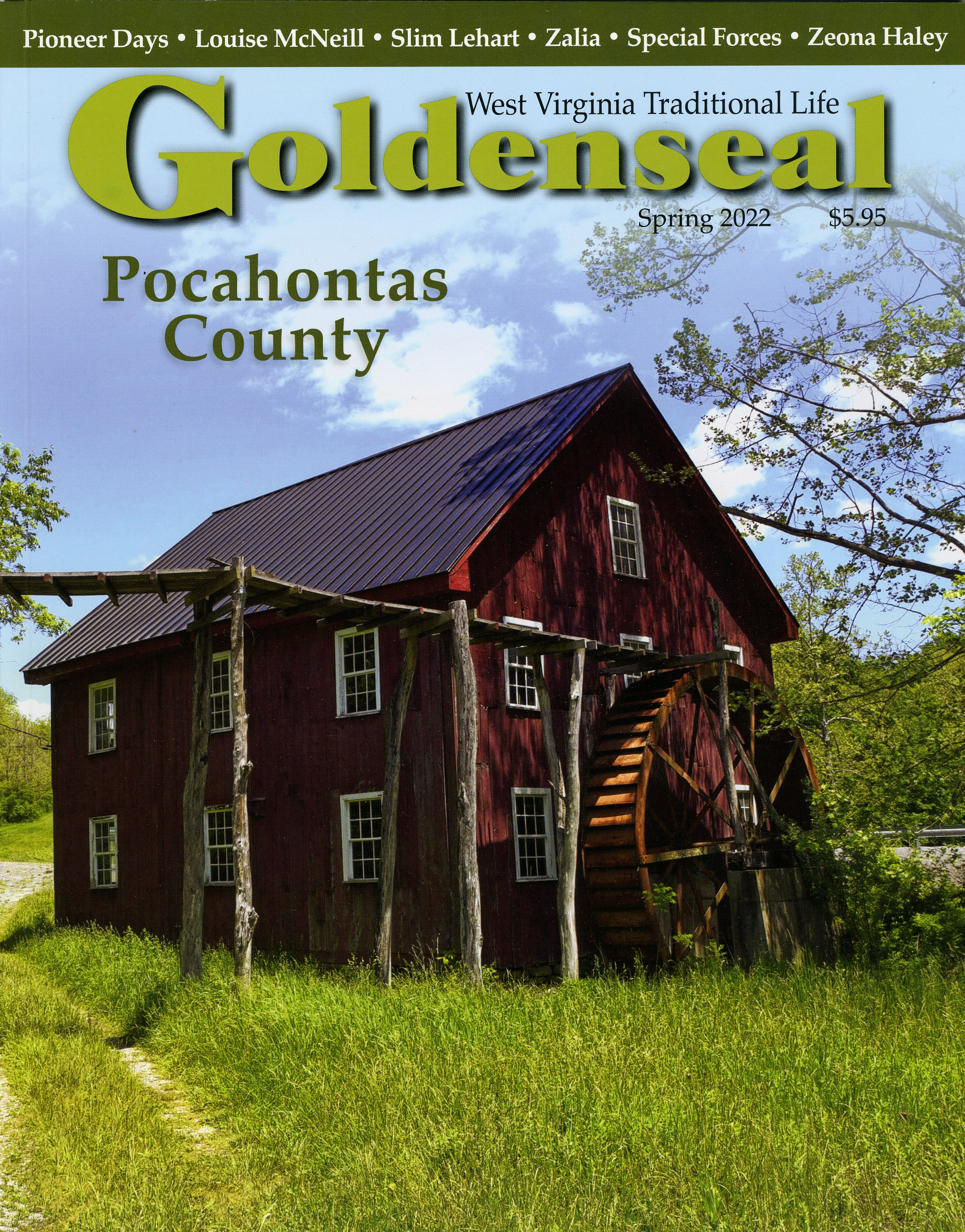
- Cover of the Spring 2022 issue
- Editor: Mary Roush
- Former editors: Tom Screven (1975-79), Ken Sullivan (1979-97), John Lilly (1997-2015), Stan Bumgardner (2015-22), Laiken Blankenship (2022-26)
- Photographer: Steve Brightwell
- Frequency: Quarterly
- Circulation: 7,000
- Publisher: State of West Virginia, Department of Tourism
- Founded: 1975
- First issue: April 1975
- Country: United States
- Based in: Charleston, West Virginia
- Language: English
- Website: goldenseal.wvculture.org

Goldenseal is a quarterly magazine devoted to West Virginia traditional life, published by the West Virginia Department of Arts, Culture and History in West Virginia.

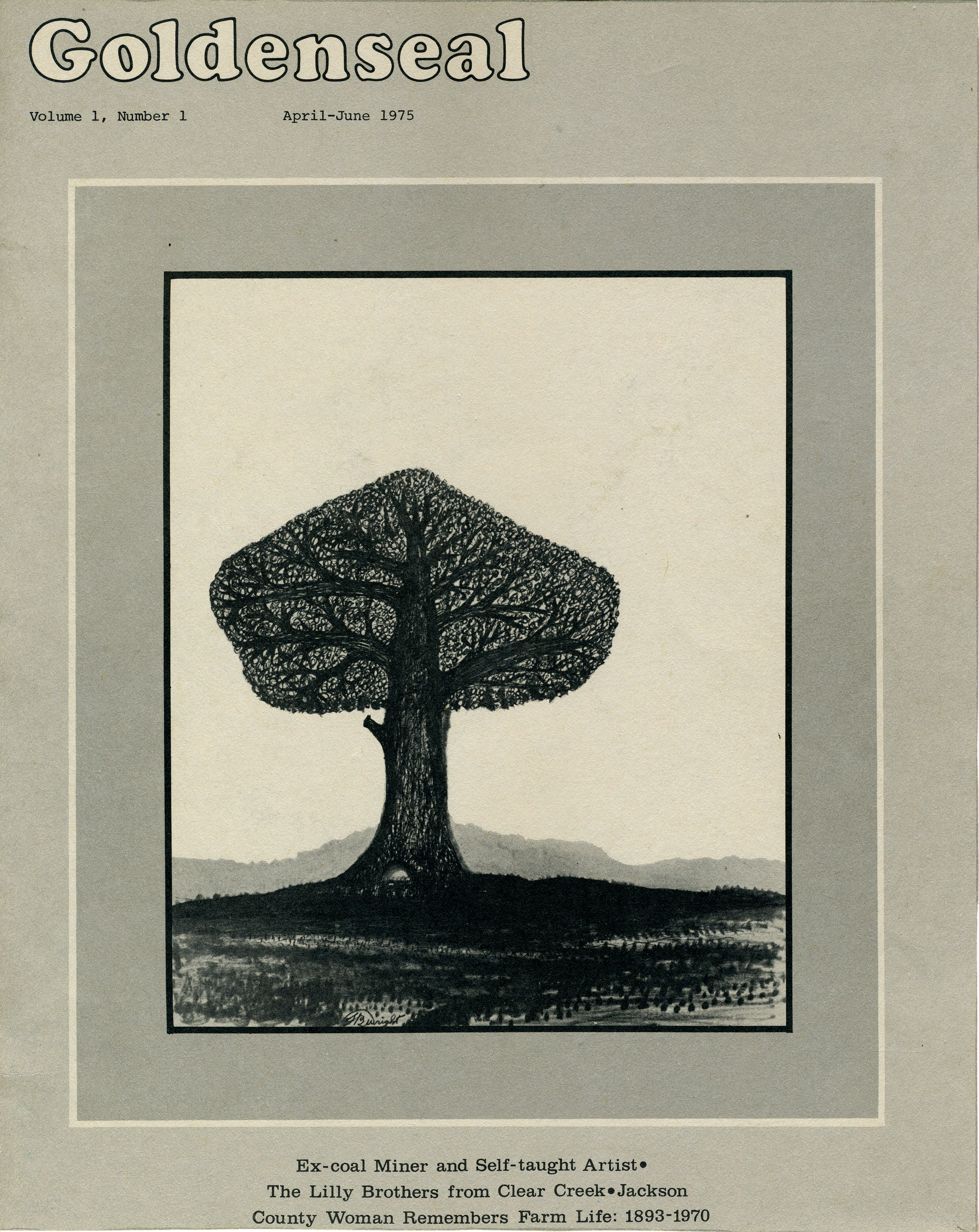
Cover of the first issue of Goldenseal, April-June 1975. Drawing by John B. Wright

== Mission ==
Goldenseal documents the state's cultural background and recent history through oral accounts, research articles, and old and new photographs. Subjects covered include labor history, folklore, music, farming, religion, traditional crafts, food, and politics. Pre-20th century history is rarely covered, however. Roughly 70% of the readers are in-state – most of the remainder are former West Virginia residents or frequent visitors.

The purpose of the magazine is to "serve not only as a device to preserve many aspects of the state's traditional life, but also as a means of communication for students and enthusiasts of West Virginia's folklife."

Goldenseal takes its name from the medicinal herb, also called yellow root, among other names, which grows in the state.

== History ==
The first issue of Goldenseal was published in April 1975 by the West Virginia Department of Commerce and the Arts and Humanities Council, with Tom Screven as editor. It built on a predecessor, Hearth & Fair, also published by the West Virginia Department of Commerce, which had been founded in 1973 to promote activities and spread information concerning the Mountain State Art & Craft Fair, held annually at the Cedar Lakes Conference Center, located near Ripley, Jackson County. Seven issues of the earlier publication had been produced, starting with an eight-page edition and ending with a sophisticated 44-page journal.

In July 1977, responsibility for publication was shifted to the Department of Arts, Culture and History. Initially the magazine was distributed for free, with the state providing funding. The first edition amounted to a few hundred, but it expanded to more than 30,000 readers at its peak. The number of pages also increased from 40 to 72 pages by July 1979 to its current 88 pages today. In fall 1981, voluntary subscription payments were introduced, and by 1995, the magazine was entirely self-supporting. Until 2025, magazine sales were the sole revenue. As of 2022, there were around 5,200 paid subscribers, and about 1,800 copies per issue were sold at newsstands and through the Goldenseal office.

In 2022, Goldenseal and Mountain Stage received the Vandalia Award, West Virginia's highest folklife honor. The individuals, organizations, and publications that receive this award "embody the spirit of West Virginia's folk heritage and are recognized for their lifetime contribution to West Virginia and its traditional culture."

In 2025, the magazine transitioned to a digital-only publication.
