= Augusta Heritage Center =

Augusta Heritage Center in Elkins, West Virginia, United States, is a non-profit organization which fosters the scholarly study and practice of traditional arts in music, dance, craft, and folklore.

The program started in 1973 as a summer program named "Augusta Heritage Arts Workshops" that focused on Appalachian heritage and traditions. In 1981, Davis & Elkins College became the sponsor of the program, and renamed the program to Augusta Heritage Center. It has become known nationally and internationally for its activities relating to traditional folklife and folk arts of many regions and cultures. It conducts intensive week-long workshops for participants and holds public concerts, dances, and festivals. It has a full-time staff, plus volunteers, seasonal staff, and work-study students. The workshops and festivals are conducted by master artists, musicians, dancers, and craftspeople.

In June of 2022 the program began operating under its own 501(c)3 non-profit status in partnership with Davis & Elkins College. The program purchased the Wilt Building in downtown Elkins in June of 2022 with plans to make the building a vibrant center for cultural exchange and community engagement.

In January 2024 the program officially relocated and began operations in the Wilt Building with plans to hold extensive renovations for the building. It will undergo a three-phased renovation. The first phase will include renovating the building’s second floor, to be used as classrooms. The second phase will involve installing fire alarms and sprinklers in the building, and renovating the apartments on the third and fourth floors. The third phase will include creating a dance floor and retail space on the first floor of the building.
