= Chickie Williams =

American singer-songwriter

Jessie Wanda Smik (née Crupe), known under the stage name Chickie Williams, (February 13, 1919 – November 18, 2007) was an American country musician from West Virginia who is best known for performing on the Wheeling Jamboree radio program on WVVA, with her husband Doc Williams and their band the Border Riders. In 1948, Williams' original arrangement of the hymn "Beyond the Sunset," was charted at number three in Billboard 's Top 100 Country Music Songs.

== Early life and family ==
Jessie Wanda Crupe was born in Bethany, West Virginia, in 1919. She married Doc Williams on October 9, 1939, in Winchester, Virginia, and they relocated to Memphis, Tennessee. The next year they moved to Wheeling, West Virginia, to raise their family when Williams became pregnant with their first child. Wheeling remained her home for the rest of her life. The couple had three daughters, Barbara, Madeline, and Karen, who were known on the air as "Peeper", "Pooch", and "Punkin".

== Death and honors ==
Williams died in November 2007. In 2008 the state of West Virginia named a section of a road in Wheeling to be called "the "Doc and Chickie Williams Highway; Country Music Royal Couple."
