= Folk festivals in the United States =

Gatherings and celebrations of folklore in the United States

Folk festivals are an important part of American community life. For the American people, popular folk festivals are important events composed of complex folklore phenomena. Folk festivals are generally used to celebrate folk music and traditional folk crafts, and some folk festivals are embodied in the form of dance and art. Some festivals are used to celebrate the harvest of crops or to gather people to watch performances and enjoy music, dance and folk culture on a specific day. These folk festivals can be categorized into music, dance, traditional culture and art as well as traditional crafts. Some folk festivals have a long history and they have been passed down from generation to generation. Even the folk festivals that have been recognized by people in recent years have received attention. There are hundreds of folk festivals in American waiting to be celebrated, and each festival has its own characteristics and style. As an inclusive country that incorporates a diverse culture, folk festivals are important events for the American people. More music festivals exist in American whether it is outdoors or indoors, the festival attracts a large number of visitors and tourists. This behavior not only promotes the economic development of every city in American, but also makes folk festivals more and more popular. In the American folk festivals, there are also some folk festivals for charity. These festivals will be held in the form of music festivals or festivals, and all the money received through the event will be used to finance poor children or for medical purposes. At the same time, some folk festivals that celebrate the harvest are also used as charity events. Crops and fruits obtained by farmers through labor are made into food or sold directly to tourists in exchange for money. These funds acquired on folk festivals are also used for charity. Folk festivals are not only a way for Americans to relax from their busy work, but also a symbol of history and culture.

== History ==
In 1940, the research and dissemination of folk music has not yet begun, Collectors and scholars have been searching and shaping folk music heritage in rural America. Throughout the twentieth century, folk music played an important role in American society. As the country has fallen into a trough because of war and economic development, these things have provided folk music with many materials such as social, cultural, political, and economic. Back in the 6th century BCE music was featured prominently as part of the Pythian Games. During the 20th Century (especially during the 1960s), People try to revive some folk festivals, music and art folk festivals are taken seriously. Folk music is experiencing one of its most robust periods since the open ended. Folk music is popular among farmers, loggers, and coal miners, as well as folks in the mountains of the south. Woody Guthrie and his descendants grew the type of music represented by the “folk” and distinguished it from other types of music. In 1954, the Newport Jazz Festival in Newport marked America’s first annual jazz festival. That year, the event brought more than 11,000 people to the East Coast resort town for a mix of academic panels and live performances

== Folk tradition ==
Since the Paleolithic era, people have needed cultural expressions to describe the connections between them and the world around them. The folk traditions of every society have poetry, songs, dances and storytelling. Folk means any group or subgroup. It can be the entire society as well as any ethnic group in society, people within the profession, political movements, and adolescents. Folklore is a broad-ranging topic; the term includes not only music, poetry and storytelling, but also food, culture, social morality and ethics, which are reflected in the creative output of the people. These are all created in the folk. However, over the time, pop music became part of folk music. The culture in these songs resonated with people and was widely circulated. The folk music has received scholars, critics, and musicians as well as people who love folk music and seen it as a hobby.

== Types of folk festival ==
The folk festivals celebrate traditional folk crafts and folk music as well as traditional culture. The most common types of folk festivals in America are music festivals，seasonal and harvest festivals and culture and art festivals.

=== Music folk festival ===
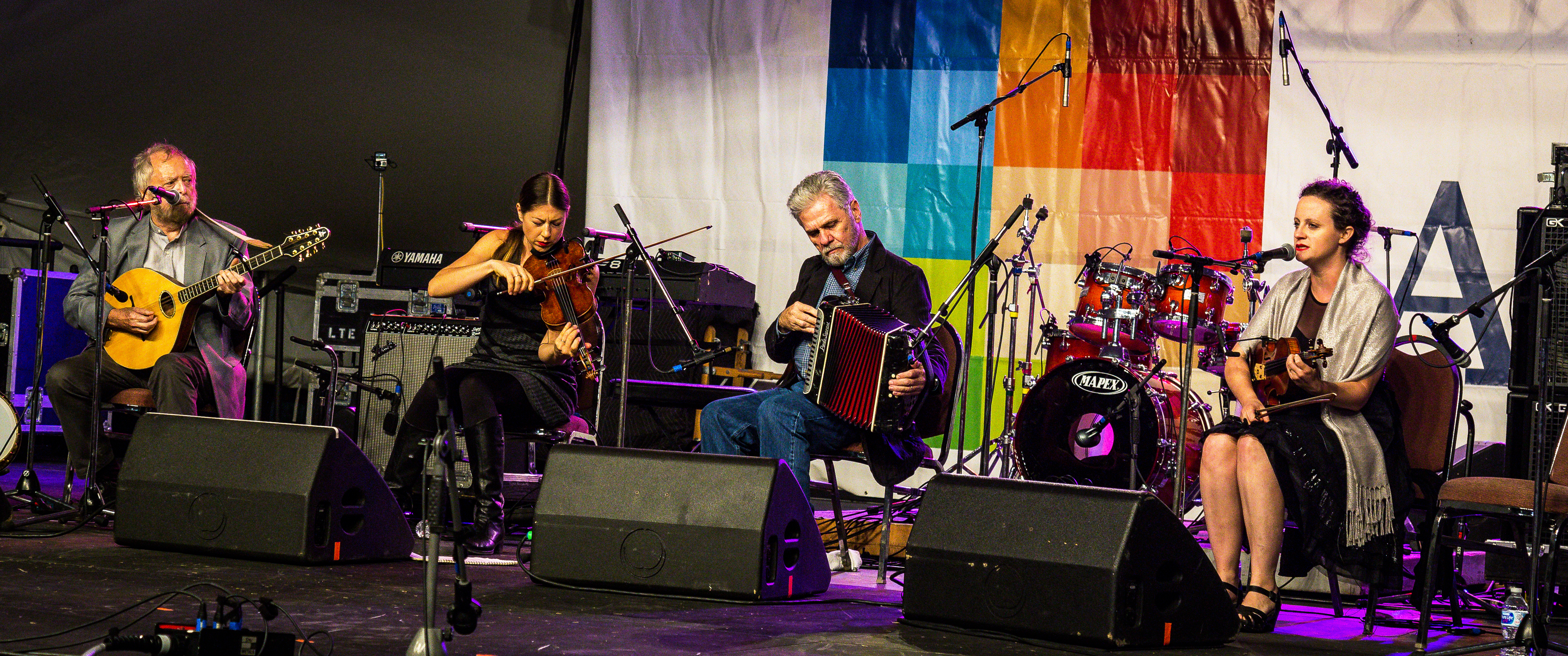
Music performance

The Music Folk Festival is the most popular type of festival in the United States. Many folk music is disseminated at folk music festivals. Some of the famous American music festivals attract a large number of tourists every year. These types of music include but are not limited to the blues, jazz, Appalachian mountain music and other genres not only give voice and shape to America's roots. There are hundreds of different-sized folk music festivals are held in the United States every year and audiences are free to choose the music festivals they are interested in. Some music festivals choose to charge viewers for tickets, while some music festivals are free to viewers. The performance of the festival is diverse. It not only presents songs to the audience, but more musical performances and music art are expressed to the audience. Generations of Americans have participated in these events and helped organize efforts to preserve their community through the song, dance, art and showmanship that are on display their respective and pride. These music folk festivals are the proud legacy for American people.

=== Seasonal and Harvest festival ===
As the weather cools and the leaves turn yellow, there are incredible beautiful views in some parts of the United States. Folk festivals held in the countryside attract a large number of tourists to come and watch. These festivals originated from farmers celebrating the harvest of crops and fruits. Most of the crops and fruits are harvested in the autumn and they are celebrated throughout the country in a fun folk festival. Some crops and fresh fruits harvested in the season will be made into food for people to enjoy, and these festivals also include some music and dance performances the festival to attract more tourists. For example, more than 60,000 people attended the AppleJcak Music Festival held in the United States to celebrate Apple’s harvest. Cider donuts, candy apples and apple pies have become the most popular food on the festival. In addition, the band parade and baking competitions as well as children's play facilities have become the most popular events during the folk festival. The seasonal and harvest folk festival also include the celebrations of pecans harvesting, cranberries, and Munich beer. People can relax themselves from the daily busy work during these festivals. They can experience the daily life of the framers and close contact with animals and nature.

=== Culture and Art festival ===
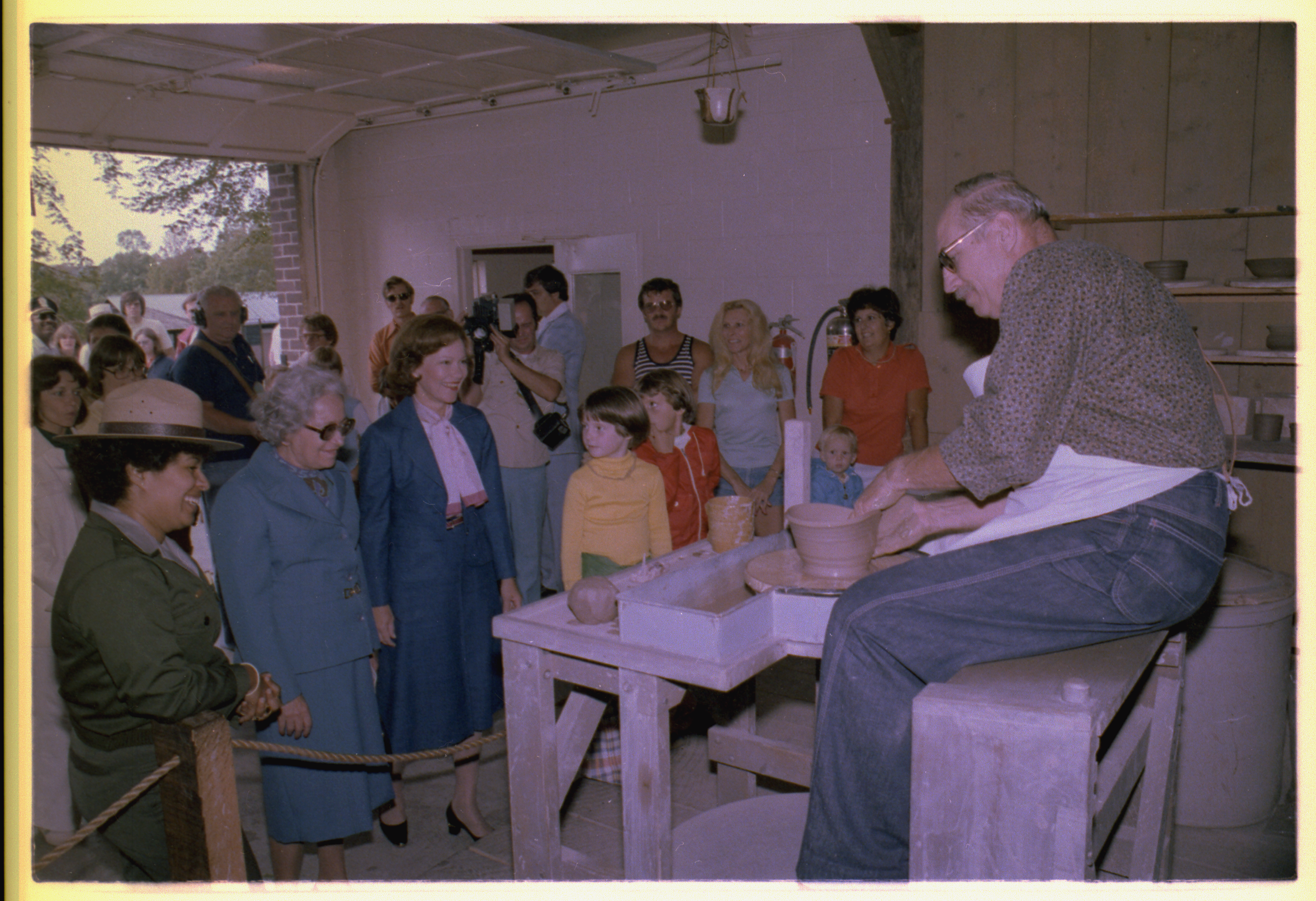
Culture and Art Folk festival in American

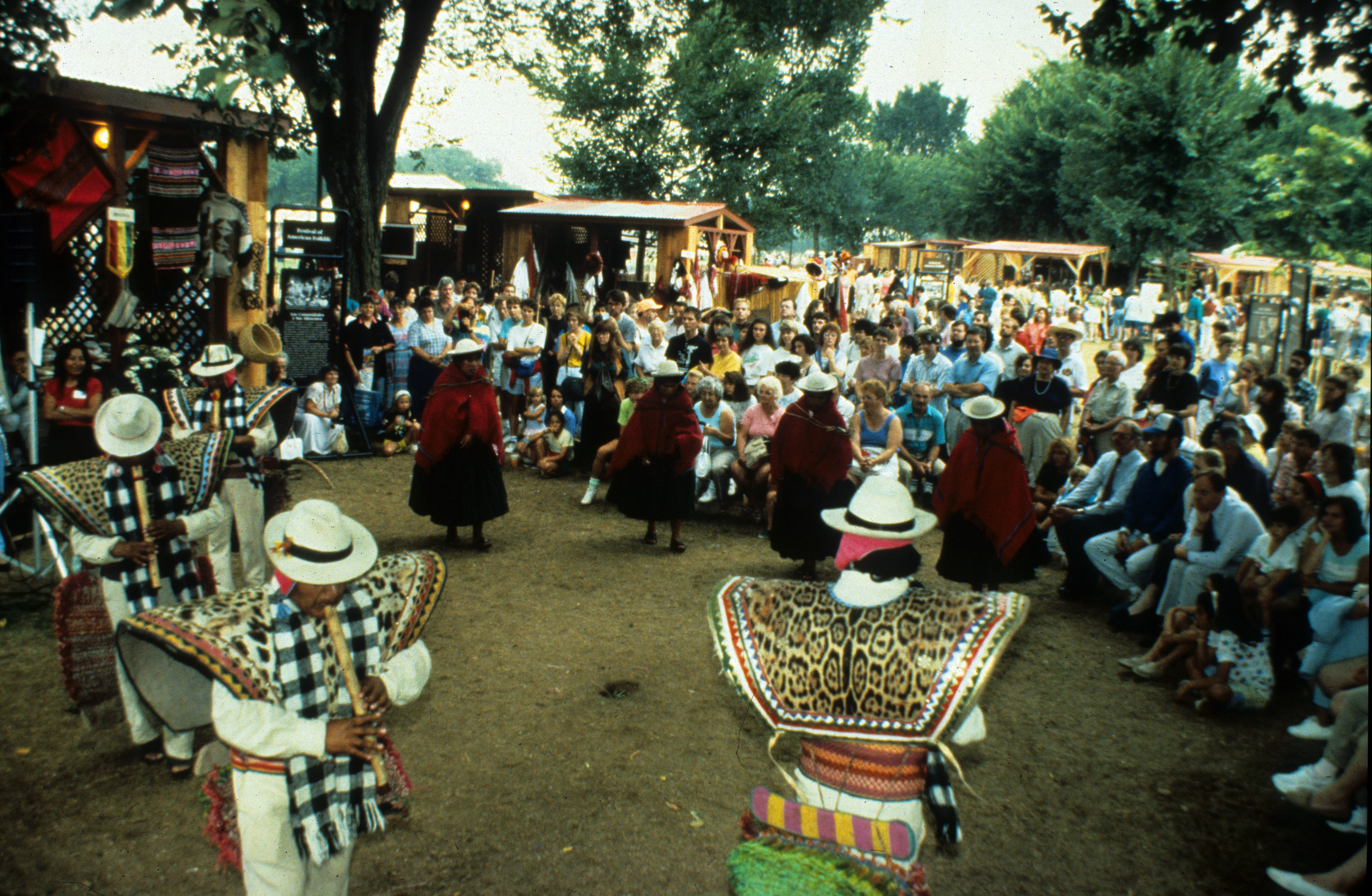
Celebration of Folk Festival in American

Each year, events of culture and art folk festival across all of the United States are held to showcase the diverse offerings that this continent is known for. Whether it’s a celebration of Hispanic culture in the Deep South, a summer escapade along the shores of British Columbia, or artists painting the next great masterpiece in the Grand Canyon, there is quite literally something for everyone and every taste in this region. American art folk festivals include music, culture, art, crafts, fashion and sports. These folk festivals with different themes are celebrated in different parts of the United States. Some works of art with collections or ornamental values are displayed to the audience. At these festivals, cultural diversity and inclusiveness are well reflected in the art and culture folk festivals. In addition to some normal festivals of communication of culture and art, there are also many bizarre art folk festivals in the United States. For example, White Linen Night and Calaveras Jumping Frog Jubilee from New Orleans and California are special and interesting cultural folk festivals. The former requires participants to wear pure white linen on the holiday day in order to keep cool, linen has good breathability and white can reflect the heat. In 1928, the town of Angels Camp held their first official frog-jumping contest as part of a celebration of the newly paved Main Street. This festival turned Mark Twain's literature into reality. At the same time, herpetological are also used as attractions in the festival. Carnival, band performances, wine tasting events, and crafts exhibitions and sales also added an atmosphere to the event. These quirky festivals are not just a way of spreading culture, they are rooted in local history and ancient traditions, which preserve special cultures.

=== Charity festival ===
There are many charitable folk festivals in the United States for the purpose of raising money, these folk festivals including but not limited to music festivals and art festivals. The purpose of these festivals is to raise funds to help people in need, such as people with serious illnesses or cancer, as well as some poor families and schools that need funds to maintain operations. For instance, the music folk festival “Merlefest” originated from a folk singer to help the community college raise funds. After the first event was successfully held for the first time in the mid-eighties, the festival was seen as a charity festival and the annual event was born. The fundraiser currently helps amass money for scholarships, buildings, technology and "keeps the college strong" for the area's students. At the festival's celebrations, there are also many local food suppliers offering discounted foods for visitors to choose from. They raise scholarships for students in this way.

== Region ==
Most folk festivals are held in rural town or tourist destinations in the United States. Whether it's music folk festivals or folk festivals that celebrate the harvest, it is more inclined to hold events and celebrations in open spaces, and rural and remote areas can better meet the needs. For example, the festival of Burning man takes place in a desert at Black Rock City Nevada and is a huge celebration of life, visitors and audiences ignite their musical enthusiasm in the vast desert. In addition, Ultra-Music Festival was held on the beaches of Miami, USA. The cool sea and sea breeze brought a different feeling with Burning man festival to people in the summer holiday. Meanwhile, the music festivals held in indoor clubs, for example Coachella Valley Music Festival and Lollapalooza festival also bring people a unique experience.

== Celebrations ==
There are many ways to celebrate folk festivals, the most common of which are music and dance performances. In traditional music folk festivals, some folk singers and bands were invited to the event to sing for the audience. These performances include not only the songs that the singers want to sing to the audience, but also some minority musical performances and special forms of music performances. In addition, in many cultural festivals, some competitions for adding atmosphere, such as baking and game competitions will be held at the event. The rides and carnivals prepared for the children are also very common in these festivals. At the festival, it is essential to have local specialties and affordable food for tourists. There are also many excellent craftsmen and jewellery designers who show their designs to visitors for appreciation and sale.
