= Doc Williams (singer) =

American singer-songwriter

- Born: Andrew John Smik Jr. June 26, 1914; Cleveland, Ohio, U.S.
- Died: January 31, 2011 (aged 96); Wheeling, West Virginia, U.S.
- Occupation(s): Bandleader, vocalist
- Years active: 1929–2006
- Spouse(s): Jessie Wanda Williams (aka Chickie Williams; died November 18, 2007); three daughters

Doc Williams (June 26, 1914 – January 31, 2011) was an influential American country music bandleader and vocalist.

== Biography ==
Born as Andrew John Smik Jr. in Cleveland, Ohio, United States, and raised in Kittanning, Pennsylvania, he got his professional start playing with the Kansas Clodhoppers during the early 1930s. Doc eventually formed his own band, Doc Williams and the Border Riders. The group went on the air on WWVA Wheeling in 1937; soon, with the addition of comedian Froggie Cortez and cowboy crooner "Big Slim the Lone Cowboy", and became one of the station's most popular attractions. He was associated with the radio station for over 40 years.

In 1939, Williams married Jessie Wanda Crupe, a singer who soon adopted the stage name Chickie Williams (February 13, 1919 – November 18, 2007). The Williams' were popular performers. Although the couple and their band the Border Riders recorded, performed live and appeared on the radio for over five decades, they never had a national hit.

Doc Williams founded Wheeling Records in 1947 and through it released all of his and his wife's albums; occasionally, they sang together, and sometimes with their three daughters. Among his best-known songs are "Willie Roy the Crippled Boy" and "My Old Brown Coat And Me".

== Death ==
Williams died on January 31, 2011, in Wheeling, West Virginia, aged 96.

== Sources ==
- Ivan M. Tribe (1998). "Doc & Chickie Williams", The Encyclopedia of Country Music. Paul Kingsbury (ed.) New York: Oxford University Press (pp. 588–589)
