= Edden Hammons =

American musician (1875–1955)

Edden Hammons (born 28 Feb 1875 Webster County, West Virginia, died 7 September 1955 ) was an American fiddler from West Virginia. He was known for his idiosyncratic style, creativity, and the many (often exaggerated) folkloric tales about him.

== Biography ==
Edden Hammons was born to Jesse Hammons and Nancy Hicks on 28 February 1875 at Williams River in Webster County, West Virginia. He was the youngest in a family of seven. His three brothers (Paris, Peter, and Cornelius), as well as his father, played the fiddle. Edden took up the fiddle at an early age, playing on a fiddle made out of a gourd that his father made for him. His family was known for its musicians, woodsmen, and hunters.

Edden progressed in his fiddle playing and soon obtained a store-bought fiddle. There are several different stories about this. In one, a friend of Edden's father asked Edden to play him a tune. Edden took out his gourd-fiddle and played for the man. Afterwards, the man was so impressed that he gave Edden his own fiddle. Another story refers to when a renowned fiddler named Bernard "Burn" Hamrick was playing for a local dance. After he finished playing, Edden's father asked Burn if Edden could play a few tunes on his fiddle. Burn agreed to let Edden play his fiddle, and was so discouraged afterwards by Edden's superior ability that he let him keep the fiddle. Whatever the story may have really been, it is sure that Edden received a nicer fiddle than his original one, and started to become a well known fiddle player in his area.

In his home, Edden was spoiled and spared from chores and work. These qualities would follow him into his adult life. A popular example among the Hammons family of Edden's distaste of work is shortly after his first marriage in 1892. His wife asked Edden to stop playing the fiddle, get a job, and support the family. Edden was quoted as saying "Pon [sic] my honor, I'll lay my fiddle down for no damn woman". The two separated and were legally divorced in 1897. 10 days after the divorce, Edden married his second wife, Elizabeth Shaffer (despite pleas from Elizabeth's family members for her to not marry Edden). The two raised seven children and remained married until Elizabeth's death in 1954.

Edden's family lived somewhat nomadically, moving from one place to another usually twice a year. Edden still rarely worked during these times. He supported his family through hunting, fishing, farming, moonshining and other odd jobs. His daughter, Emma Hammons, recalls that "[h]e whittled axe handles, he played for dances, different things. He picked up money that way. Ginseng, he'd get money that way. It was against the law but he would kill squirrels, turkeys and sell them, or fish - he always had a couple dollars in his pocket somehow".

Edden continued his fiddle playing throughout his adult life. At this point he was regarded as one of the best fiddlers from West Virginia. He won many fiddle contests. People would visit at odd hours just to hear him play, and on some occasions, people would have him play music over the phone while the neighborhood listened in. Other anecdotes appear from this era, such as how Edden would show up somewhere to play music, and would carry his fiddle in a flour sack (with the flour still inside it). His nephew, Currence, recalls when "[Edden] just walked over to the corner and picked up the flour poke and they all got to looking to what he was getting. He pulled that old fiddle out and flour all over it. He dusted it off, blowed it off, you know. Some of them went to laughing and hollering about that flour. 'Upon my honor,' Edden said, 'that's just as good as the best cases every made, he said, 'that flour makes her play good.'"

On 7 September 1955, Hammons died of coronary thrombosis at Renick in Pocahontas County, West Virginia. His death record cites his occupation as fiddler.

== Music ==
Presently, Edden Hammons is still a respected fiddler. He has recorded several solo fiddle tunes on two compilations of his music.

Although occasionally accompanied by his son, James, Hammons typically played alone. Consequently, he was able to play some tunes in odd time signatures, play certain parts as many times as he found fit, and change the tempo at his will without having to worry about throwing off a band. He was also known for playing several variations of the same melody within a tune, adding a lot of ornamentation, and occasionally tagging on a few extra beats to some parts (such as "Big Fancy").

Edden is one of the few, if not the only, sources of many traditional songs that are popular today. These include "Shaking Off the Acorns", "Sandy Boys", "Big Fancy", and "Old Greasy Coat". His influence is still widespread among old-time fiddlers and other musicians within the old-time genre.

In August 1947, Louis Chappell recorded 52 tunes by Edden Hammons. These were released as two separate LPs. The first was "The Edden Hammons Collection, Volume One", which contained 15 of these recordings. Some of these tunes included "Washington's March", "Shaking Off the Acorns", and "Fine Times At Our House". The second release was a two-disc set called "The Edden Hammons Collection, Volume Two", which contained more recorded songs from the same session. This release contained such tunes as "Birdy", "Jake's Got the Bellyache", and "Big Hoedown". Both of these LP's were released in 1984

== Discography ==
- 1984 - The Edden Hammons Collection, Volume One. Edden Hammons, West Virginia University Press.
- 1984 - The Edden Hammons Collection, Volume Two. Edden Hammons, West Virginia University Press.
