= Hozier discography =

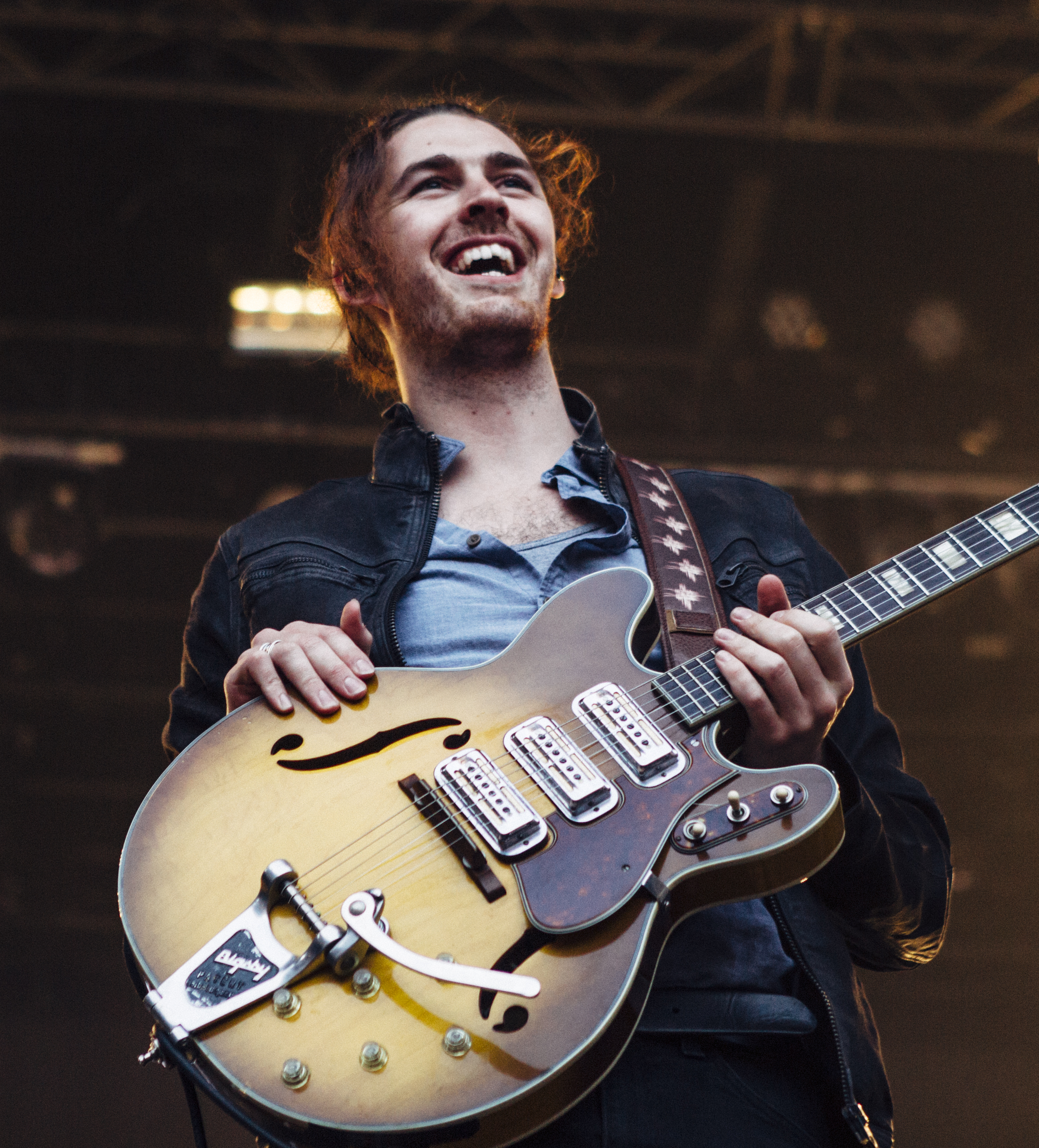
- Hozier performing in September 2015
- Studio albums: 3
- EPs: 8
- Singles: 24

Irish singer-songwriter and musician Hozier has released 3 studio albums, 8 EPs, and 24 singles (including one as a featured artist). His debut studio album, Hozier, was released in September 2014. The album peaked at number one on the Irish Albums Chart. The album includes the singles "Take Me to Church", "From Eden", "Sedated", "Work Song", "Someone New", "Jackie and Wilson" and "Cherry Wine". "Take Me to Church" achieved widespread global popularity, topping the charts in twelve countries and reaching the top ten in twenty-one other territories. The song was nominated for the Grammy Award for Song of the Year at the 57th Annual Grammy Awards and has been certified diamond in the US. His second studio album, Wasteland, Baby!, was released in March 2019. The album peaked at number one on the Irish Albums Chart and the US Billboard 200. The album includes the singles "Nina Cried Power", "Movement", "Almost (Sweet Music)" and "Dinner & Diatribes". He released his third album Unreal Unearth in August 2023, which also topped the Irish Albums Chart and became his first number-one album in the UK.

== Studio albums ==
List of studio albums, with selected details, peak chart positions, certifications and sales
Title	Album details	Peak chart positions										Certifications	Sales
Title	Album details	IRL	AUS	BEL (FL)	CAN	GER	NLD	NZ	SWI	UK	US	Certifications	Sales
Hozier	Released: 19 September 2014; Label: Rubyworks, Island; Format: CD, LP, digital download	1	3	2	2	14	7	3	14	3	2	IRMA: 6× Platinum; ARIA: 2× Platinum; BPI: 3× Platinum; BVMI: Gold; MC: 7× Platinum; NVPI: Platinum; RIAA: 5× Platinum; RMNZ: 7× Platinum	US: 972,000
Wasteland, Baby!	Released: 1 March 2019; Label: Rubyworks, Island; Format: CD, LP, digital download	1	8	19	9	15	3	9	16	6	1	BPI: Gold; MC: Platinum; RIAA: Platinum	US: 75,000
Unreal Unearth	Released: 18 August 2023; Label: Rubyworks, Island; Format: CD, LP, digital download, cassette	1	13	7	7	4	2	2	5	1	3	BPI: Gold; RIAA: Platinum; RMNZ: Platinum (Note: Certification for Unreal Unearth: Unheard)	US: 39,000

== Extended plays ==
List of EPs, with selected details and peak chart positions
Title	EP details	Peak chart positions						
Title	EP details	CAN	POR	SWI	US	US Alt	US Folk	US Rock
Take Me to Church	Released: 13 September 2013; Label: Rubyworks; Format: Digital download	—	—	—	107	—	3	—
From Eden	Released: 9 March 2014; Label: Rubyworks; Format: Digital download	—	—	—	— (Note: From Eden did not enter the US Billboard 200 but did peak at number 184 on the US Top Current Albums chart.)	—	9	—
Spotify Sessions London	Released: 2014; Label: Rubyworks; Format: Digital download	—	—	—	—	—	—	—
Live in America	Released: 31 July 2015; Label: Rubyworks; Format: Digital download	—	—	—	—	21	7	29
Nina Cried Power	Released: 7 September 2018; Label: Rubyworks; Format: Digital download	33	—	—	60	5	2	8
Spotify Singles	Released: 2019; Label: Rubyworks; Format: Digital download	—	—	—	—	—	—	—
Eat Your Young	Released: 17 March 2023; Label: Rubyworks; Format: Digital download	—	—	—	—	—	—	—
Unheard	Released: 22 March 2024; Label: Rubyworks; Format: Digital download	8	86	57	10	3	3	3
Unaired	Released: 16 August 2024; Label: Rubyworks; Format: Digital download	—	—	—	—	—	—	—
"—" denotes an EP that did not chart or was not released in that territory.

== Singles ==
=== As lead artist ===
List of singles as lead artist, with selected peak chart positions and certifications
Title	Year	Peak chart positions										Certifications	Album/EP
Title	Year	IRL	AUS	BEL (FL)	CAN	GER	NLD	NZ	SWI	UK	US	Certifications	Album/EP
"Take Me to Church"	2013	2	2	1	2	2	2	2	1	2	2	ARIA: 18× Platinum; BPI: 8× Platinum; BRMA: 3× Platinum; BVMI: 7× Gold; IFPI SWI: Platinum; MC: Diamond; NVPI: 3× Platinum; RIAA: 15× Platinum; RMNZ: 11× Platinum	Hozier
"From Eden"	2014	2	—	— (Note: "From Eden" did not enter the Flanders Ultratop 50, but peaked at number 9 on the Ultratip chart.)	—	—	— (Note: "From Eden" did not enter the Netherlands' Single Top 100 but peaked on the Netherlands' Single Tip Chart at number 8.)	—	—	69	—	ARIA: Gold; BPI: Platinum; MC: Platinum; RIAA: 2× Platinum; RMNZ: Platinum	Hozier
"Sedated"	2014	3	—	—	—	—	—	—	—	—	—	RIAA: Gold	Hozier
"Work Song"	2015	39	—	—	92	—	—	— (Note: "Work Song" did not enter the NZ Top 40 Singles Chart, but peaked at number 27 on the NZ Catalogue Singles Chart.)	—	—	— (Note: "Work Song" did not enter the Billboard Hot 100, but peaked at number 20 on the Bubbling Under Hot 100 chart.)	BPI: Platinum; MC: 5× Platinum; RIAA: 4× Platinum; RMNZ: 4× Platinum	Hozier
"Someone New"	2015	13	24	— (Note: "Someone New" did not enter the Flanders Ultratop 50, but peaked at number 5 on the Ultratip chart.)	90	—	— (Note: "Someone New" did not enter the Netherlands' Single Top 100 but peaked on the Netherlands' Single Tip Chart at number 10.)	13	— (Note: "Someone New" did not enter the Swiss Singles chart, but charted at number 77 on the Swiss Airplay chart.)	19	— (Note: "Someone New" did not enter the Billboard Hot 100, but peaked at number one on the Bubbling Under Hot 100 chart.)	ARIA: Platinum; BPI: 2x Platinum; MC: 4× Platinum; RIAA: 3× Platinum; RMNZ: 4× Platinum	Hozier
"Jackie & Wilson"	2015	68	—	—	— (Note: "Jackie & Wilson" did not enter the Billboard Canadian Hot 100, but peaked at number 64 on the Canadian Digital Song Sales chart.)	—	—	—	—	179	—	BPI: Gold; MC: Platinum; RIAA: Platinum; RMNZ: Platinum	Hozier
"Cherry Wine"	2016	56	—	— (Note: "Cherry Wine" did not enter the Flanders Ultratop 50, but charted as an "extra tip" on the Ultratip chart.)	—	—	—	—	—	—	—	BPI: Platinum; MC: Platinum; RIAA: 2× Platinum; RMNZ: 2× Platinum	Hozier
"Better Love"	2016	72	—	— (Note: "Better Love" did not enter the Flanders Ultratop 50, but charted as an "extra tip" on the Ultratip chart.)	—	—	—	—	—	—	—		The Legend of Tarzan
"Nina Cried Power" (featuring Mavis Staples)	2018	10	—	— (Note: "Nine Cried Power" did not enter the Flanders Ultratop 50, but peaked at number 30 on the Ultratip chart.)	—	—	— (Note: "Nina Cried Power" did not enter the Netherlands' Single Top 100 but peaked on the Netherlands' Single Tip Chart at number 28.)	— (Note: "Nina Cried Power" did not enter the NZ Top 40 Music Chart, but peaked at number 27 on the NZ Hot Singles Chart.)	—	87	—	MC: Gold	Wasteland, Baby!
"Movement"	2018	40	—	— (Note: "Movement" did not enter the Flanders Ultratop 50, but peaked at number 14 on the Ultratip chart.)	— (Note: "Movement" did not enter the Billboard Canadian Hot 100, but peaked at number 17 on the Canadian Digital Song Sales chart.)	—	—	— (Note: "Movement" did not enter the NZ Top 40 Singles Chart, but peaked at number 26 on the NZ Hot Singles Chart.)	—	— (Note: "Movement" did not enter the UK Singles Chart, but peaked at number 91 on the UK Singles Downloads Chart.)	— (Note: "Movement" did not enter the Billboard Hot 100, but peaked at number 11 on the Digital Song Sales chart.)	BPI: Silver; MC: Platinum; RIAA: Platinum; RMNZ: Platinum	Wasteland, Baby!
"Almost (Sweet Music)"	2019	8	—	— (Note: "Almost (Sweet Music)" did not enter the Flanders Ultratop 50, but peaked at number 33 on the Ultratip chart.)	—	—	—	— (Note: "Almost (Sweet Music)" did not enter the NZ Top 40 Singles Chart, but peaked at number 18 on the NZ Hot Singles Chart.)	—	82	— (Note: "Almost (Sweet Music)" did not enter the Billboard Hot 100, but peaked at number 45 on the Digital Song Sales chart.)	BPI: Platinum; MC: 2× Platinum; RIAA: 2× Platinum; RMNZ: 2× Platinum	Wasteland, Baby!
"Dinner & Diatribes"	2019	—	—	—	—	—	—	—	—	—	—		Wasteland, Baby!
"The Bones (remix)" (with Maren Morris)	2019	—	—	—	—	—	—	—	—	—	—		Non-album singles
"Jackboot Jump"	2019	— (Note: "Jackboot Jump" did not enter the Irish Singles Chart, but peaked at number 15 on the Irish Homegrown Top 20 chart.)	—	—	—	—	—	—	—	—	—		Non-album singles
"The Parting Glass"	2020	44	—	—	—	—	—	—	—	—	—		Non-album singles
"Swan Upon Leda"	2022	33	—	—	—	—	—	— (Note: "Swan Upon Leda" did not enter the NZ Top 40 Singles Chart, but peaked at number 15 on the NZ Hot Singles Chart.)	—	—	—		Non-album singles
"Eat Your Young"	2023	7	—	—	40	— (Note: "Eat Your Young" did not enter the German Singles Chart, but peaked at number seven on the Deutsche Single Trend Chart.)	94	38	73	22	67	BPI: Gold; RIAA: Platinum; RMNZ: Gold	Unreal Unearth
"Francesca"	2023	37	—	—	—	—	—	— (Note: "Francesca" did not enter the NZ Top 40 Singles Chart, but peaked at number 24 on the NZ Hot Singles Chart.)	—	—	—	RIAA: Gold	Unreal Unearth
"Unknown / Nth"	2023	55	—	—	—	—	—	— (Note: "Unknown / Nth" did not enter the NZ Top 40 Singles Chart, but peaked at number 10 on the NZ Hot Singles Chart.)	—	—	—	RIAA: Gold; RMNZ: Gold	Unreal Unearth
"De Selby (Part 2)"	2023	30	—	—	—	—	—	— (Note: "De Selby (Part 2)" did not enter the NZ Top 40 Singles Chart, but peaked at number 32 on the NZ Hot Singles Chart.)	—	—	—		Unreal Unearth
"Northern Attitude" (with Noah Kahan)	2023	25	63	—	21	—	— (Note: "Northern Attitude" did not enter the Dutch Single Top 100, but peaked at number 11 on the Single Tip chart.)	39	—	—	37	BPI: Platinum; MC: 2× Platinum; RIAA: Platinum; RMNZ: Platinum	Stick Season (Forever)
"Too Sweet"	2024	1	1	15	2	10	9	1	5	1	1	ARIA: 8× Platinum; BPI: 4× Platinum; BRMA: Platinum; BVMI: Gold; IFPI SWI: Platinum; NVPI: Gold; RIAA: 6× Platinum; RMNZ: 7× Platinum	Unheard
"Nobody's Soldier"	2024	44	—	—	90	—	—	— (Note: "Nobody's Soldier" did not enter the NZ Top 40 Singles Chart, but peaked at number seven on the NZ Hot Singles Chart.)	—	48	— (Note: "Nobody's Soldier" did not enter the Billboard Hot 100, but peaked at number one on the Bubbling Under Hot 100 chart.)		Unaired
"Hymn to Virgil"	2024	— (Note: "Hymn to Virgil" did not enter the Irish Singles Chart, but peaked at number five on the Irish Homegrown Top 20 chart.)	—	—	—	—	—	—	—	—	—		Unreal Unearth: Unending
"The First Time Ever I Saw Your Face" (with Barbra Streisand)	2025	—	—	—	—	—	—	—	—	—	—		The Secret of Life: Partners, Volume Two
"Rubber Band Man" (with Mumford & Sons)	2025	52	—	—	78	—	— (Note: "Rubber Band Man" did not enter the Netherlands' Single Top 100 but peaked on the Netherlands' Airplay Chart at number 48.)	— (Note: "Rubber Band Man" did not enter the NZ Top 40 Singles Chart, but peaked at number 13 on the NZ Hot Singles Chart.)	—	64	— (Note: "Rubber Band Man" did not enter the Billboard Hot 100, but peaked at number 20 on the Bubbling Under Hot 100 chart.)		Prizefighter
"Fairytale of New York" (with Jessie Buckley)	2026	17	—	—	—	—	—	— (Note: "Fairytale of New York" did not enter the NZ Top 40 Singles Chart, but peaked at number 19 on the NZ Hot Singles Chart.)	—	— (Note: "Fairytale of New York" did not enter the UK Singles Chart, but peaked at number ten on the UK Singles Sales Chart.)	—		20th Century Paddy – The Songs of Shane McGowan
"—" denotes a single that did not chart or was not released in that territory.

=== As featured artist ===
List of singles as featured artist, with selected peak chart positions and certifications
Title	Year	Peak chart positions										Certifications	Album
Title	Year	IRL	CZR	GER	GRE	ITA	NLD	SWE	SWI	UK	WW	Certifications	Album
"Tell It to My Heart" (Meduza featuring Hozier)	2021	13	16	70	81	70	55	97	65	46	186	BPI: Silver; FIMI: Gold; RIAA: Gold; RMNZ: Gold	Non-album single

== Other charted and certified songs ==
List of other charted and certified songs, with selected peak chart positions and certifications
Title	Year	Peak chart positions										Certifications	Album/EP
Title	Year	IRL	CAN	LTU	NED Tip.	NZ	SWE Heat.	UK	US	US Alt	US Rock	Certifications	Album/EP
"Like Real People Do"	2013	69	—	—	—	— (Note: "Like Real People Do" did not enter the NZ Top 40 Singles Chart, but a version with added nature sounds peaked at number 32 on the NZ Hot Singles Chart in 2025.)	—	—	—	— (Note: "Like Real People Do" did not enter the Hot Alternative Songs chart, but peaked at number 24 on the Alternative Digital Song Sales Chart.)	32	BPI: Gold; MC: 3× Platinum; RIAA: 2× Platinum; RMNZ: Platinum	Take Me to Church and Hozier
"Angel of Small Death & the Codeine Scene"	2013	34	—	—	—	—	—	—	—	—	30	BPI: Gold; MC: Gold; RIAA: Platinum; RMNZ: Platinum	Take Me to Church and Hozier
"Arsonist's Lullabye"	2014	—	—	—	—	—	—	—	—	— (Note: "Arsonist's Lullabye" did not enter the Hot Alternative Songs chart, but peaked at number 10 on the Alternative Digital Song Sales Chart.)	25	BPI: Silver; RIAA: Gold; RMNZ: Gold	From Eden and Hozier
"To Be Alone"	2014	74	—	—	—	—	—	—	—	—	48	RIAA: Gold; MC: Gold	From Eden and Hozier
"In a Week" (featuring Karen Cowley)	2014	—	—	—	—	—	—	—	—	—	—	RIAA: Gold	Hozier
"It Will Come Back"	2014	—	—	—	—	—	—	—	—	—	—	RIAA: Gold	Hozier
"Foreigner's God"	2014	—	—	—	—	—	—	—	—	—	—	RIAA: Gold	Hozier
"Do I Wanna Know?" (live at the BBC)	2014	9	73	79	23	21	17	18	— (Note: "Do I Wanna Know?" did not enter the Billboard Hot 100, but peaked at number 6 on the Bubbling Under Hot 100 chart.)	9	13	RMNZ: Platinum	Hozier
"NFWMB"	2018	27	—	—	—	—	—	—	—	—	34		Nina Cried Power
"Moment's Silence (Common Tongue)"	2018	—	—	—	—	—	—	—	—	— (Note: "Moment's Silence (Common Tongue)" did not enter the Hot Alternative Songs chart, but peaked at number 24 on the Alternative Digital Song Sales Chart.)	—		Nina Cried Power
"Shrike"	2018	31	—	—	—	—	—	—	—	—	30	MC: Platinum; RIAA: Gold; RMNZ: Gold	Nina Cried Power and Wasteland, Baby!
"No Plan"	2019	—	—	—	—	—	—	—	—	—	44		Wasteland, Baby!
"To Noise Making (Sing)"	2019	44	—	—	—	—	—	—	—	—	35		Wasteland, Baby!
"Would That I"	2019	—	—	—	—	—	—	—	—	—	—	BPI: Gold; MC: Platinum; RIAA: Platinum; RMNZ: Gold	Wasteland, Baby!
"Wasteland, Baby!"	2019	—	—	—	—	—	—	—	—	—	—	MC: Gold; RIAA: Gold	Wasteland, Baby!
"All Things End"	2023	30	— (Note: "All Things End" did not enter the Canadian Hot 100, but peaked at number 36 on the Canadian Digital Song Sales chart.)	—	—	— (Note: "All Things End" did not enter the NZ Top 40 Singles Chart, but peaked at number 13 on the NZ Hot Singles Chart.)	—	—	— (Note: "All Things End" did not enter the Billboard Hot 100, but peaked at number 35 on the Digital Song Sales chart.)	15	19		Eat Your Young and Unreal Unearth
"Through Me (The Flood)"	2023	40	— (Note: "Through Me (The Flood)" did not enter the Canadian Hot 100, but peaked at number 33 on the Digital Song Sales chart.)	—	—	— (Note: "Through Me (The Flood)" did not enter the NZ Top 40 Singles Chart, but peaked at number 18 on the NZ Hot Singles Chart.)	—	—	— (Note: "Through Me (The Flood)" did not enter the Billboard Hot 100, but peaked at number 36 on the Digital Song Sales chart.)	17	22		Eat Your Young and Unreal Unearth
"De Selby (Part 1)"	2023	34	—	—	—	— (Note: "De Selby (Part 1)" did not enter the NZ Top 40 Singles Chart, but peaked at number nine on the NZ Hot Singles Chart.)	—	—	—	22	28		Unreal Unearth
"First Time"	2023	— (Note: "First Time" did not enter the Irish Singles Chart, but peaked at number 19 on the Irish Homegrown Top 20 chart.)	—	—	—	— (Note: "First Time" did not enter the NZ Top 40 Singles Chart, but peaked at number 11 on the NZ Hot Singles Chart.)	—	—	—	19	25		Unreal Unearth
"I, Carrion (Icarian)"	2023	—	—	—	—	— (Note: "I, Carrion (Icarian)" did not enter the NZ Top 40 Singles Chart, but peaked at number 15 on the NZ Hot Singles Chart.)	—	—	—	25	31		Unreal Unearth
"Damage Gets Done" (with Brandi Carlile)	2023	67	—	—	—	— (Note: "Damage Gets Done" did not enter the NZ Top 40 Singles Chart, but peaked at number six on the NZ Hot Singles Chart.)	—	86	—	16	21		Unreal Unearth
"Who We Are"	2023	—	—	—	—	—	—	—	—	—	32		Unreal Unearth
"Son of Nyx"	2023	—	—	—	—	—	—	—	—	—	41		Unreal Unearth
"To Someone from a Warm Climate (Uiscefhuaraithe)"	2023	—	—	—	—	—	—	—	—	—	45		Unreal Unearth
"Butchered Tongue"	2023	—	—	—	—	—	—	—	—	—	49		Unreal Unearth
"Anything But"	2023	—	—	—	—	—	—	—	—	—	47		Unreal Unearth
"Abstract (Psychopomp)"	2023	—	—	—	—	—	—	—	—	—	42		Unreal Unearth
"First Light"	2023	—	—	—	—	—	—	—	—	—	50		Unreal Unearth
"Be" (Acoustic)	2024	—	—	—	—	— (Note: "Be" (Acoustic) did not enter the NZ Top 40 Singles Chart, but peaked at number 13 on the NZ Hot Singles Chart.)	—	—	—	—	—		Wasteland, Baby! (Special Edition)
"Wildflower and Barley" (with Allison Russell)	2024	35	72	—	—	— (Note: "Wildflower and Barley" did not enter the NZ Top 40 Singles Chart, but peaked at number 17 on the NZ Hot Singles Chart.)	—	86	88	10	11		Unheard
"Empire Now"	2024	39	79	—	—	— (Note: "Empire Now" did not enter the NZ Top 40 Singles Chart, but peaked at number 15 on the NZ Hot Singles Chart.)	—	92	98	13	14		Unheard
"Fare Well"	2024	—	—	—	—	— (Note: "Fare Well" did not enter the NZ Top 40 Singles Chart, but peaked at number 21 on the NZ Hot Singles Chart.)	—	—	— (Note: "Fare Well" did not enter the Billboard Hot 100, but peaked at number eight on the Bubbling Under Hot 100 chart.)	15	19		Unheard
"July"	2024	—	—	—	—	— (Note: "July" did not enter the NZ Top 40 Singles Chart, but peaked at number 11 on the NZ Hot Singles Chart.)	—	—	—	— (Note: "July" did not enter the Hot Alternative Songs chart, but peaked at number seven on the Alternative Digital Song Sales Chart.)	40		Unaired
"That You Are" (with Bedouine)	2024	—	—	—	—	— (Note: "That You Are" did not enter the NZ Top 40 Singles Chart, but peaked at number 15 on the NZ Hot Singles Chart.)	—	—	—	— (Note: "That You Are" did not enter the Hot Alternative Songs chart, but peaked at number nine on the Alternative Digital Song Sales Chart.)	49		Unaired
"Bullseye" (with Lucy Dacus)	2025	—	—	—	—	— (Note: "Bullseye" did not enter the NZ Top 40 Singles Chart, but peaked at number 14 on the NZ Hot Singles Chart.)	—	—	—	—	35		Forever Is a Feeling
"—" denotes a song that did not chart or was not released in that territory.
