= Someone New (Hozier song) =

2015 song performed by Hozier

Single by Hozier

from the album Hozier
- Released: 11 May 2015
- Recorded: 2013
- Genre: Indie rock; soul; blues
- Length: 3:42
- Label: Rubyworks; Columbia
- Songwriters: Andrew Hozier-Byrne; Sallay-Matu Garnett
- Producers: Rob Kirwan; Andrew Hozier-Byrne

Hozier singles chronology
"Work Song" (2015)	"Someone New" (2015)	"Jackie and Wilson" (2015)

Music video
- "Someone New" on YouTube

"Someone New" is a song recorded by Irish singer-songwriter Hozier for his 2014 eponymous debut studio album. It was released on 11 May 2015 as the fifth single from the record and peaked at number 13 on the Irish Singles Chart. An accompanying music video was released featuring actress Natalie Dormer.

== Writing and composition ==
"Someone New" is a pop-soul song listed as the fourth track on the album, written by Hozier and Sallay Matu Garnett. It was the oldest song from Hozier's previous demos to make it onto the album; he has stated that it is the track that "resonated with him the least" by release. The song has indie-rock influences with a pizzicato bass, distorted chord progressions, and choral harmonies intertwined with echoing vocals. The lyrics are tongue-in-cheek and have an "overarching theme of love and theistic conflict" and are described as "uplifting" and a confession of his "wandering ways", describing the act of falling in love with strangers. Hozier has stated that it is a "love song [...] about love at its most empty and vacuous and futile."

== Critical reception ==
"Someone New" received generally positive reviews from music critics, with The A.V. Club describing the song as "soulful" and "vintage" and Exclaim! stating that "...while the grandeur of Hozier's majestic vocals explore atmospheric heights, they also plunge cavernous depths as he taps into things primeval and animalistic." The Irish Times praised the track for its "small touches" and "spectral choir", while The Arts Desk gave poor feedback, negatively comparing its guitar work to a James Morrison track.

== Commercial performance ==
The song peaked at number 7 on the Billboard Hot Rock and Alternative Songs Chart, and appeared within the top thirty on the Billboard Adult Contemporary, Adult Top 40, Alternative Airplay, and Rock Airplay charts, respectively. "Someone New" peaked at number 13 on the Irish Singles Chart and scored charting positions in the United Kingdom, Scotland and Canada.

== Music video ==
The official music video for "Someone New" was released on 2 March 2015. It stars actress Natalie Dormer, while Hozier appears only in silhouette. The video shows Dormer's character as a "women whose mercurial tendencies mask an overwhelming loneliness", traveling through the Underground toward the streets of London. She repetitively imagines having romantic encounters and exchanges with fellow passengers and passers-by, while Hozier performs the song in a local pub. It has garnered over 86 million views on YouTube.

== Personnel ==
Musicians

- Andrew Hozier-Byrne – vocals, guitar, piano, synthesizer
- Alex Ryan – bass, piano
- Ken Rice – violin, viola
- Kate Ellis – cello
- Rory Doyle – drums, percussion

Technical

- Andrew Hozier-Byrne – producer
- Rob Kirwan – producer, engineer
- Andrew Scheps – mixing
- Stephen Marcussen – mastering

== Charts ==
=== Weekly charts ===
Chart (2015)	Peak position
Australia (ARIA)	24
Belgium (Ultratip Bubbling Under Flanders)	5
Canada Hot 100 (Billboard)	90
Czech Republic Airplay (ČNS IFPI)	15
Finland Airplay (Radiosoittolista)	91
Iceland (Tonlist)	4
Ireland (IRMA)	13
New Zealand (Recorded Music NZ)	13
Scottish Singles Sales (Official Charts)	12
Slovakia Airplay (ČNS IFPI)	55
Switzerland Airplay (Schweizer Hitparade)	77
UK Singles (Official Charts)	19
US Adult Contemporary (Billboard)	29
US Adult Pop Airplay (Billboard)	10
US Hot Rock & Alternative Songs (Billboard)	7
US Rock & Alternative Airplay (Billboard)	28

=== Year-end charts ===
Chart (2015)	Rank
UK Singles (Official Charts Company)	100
US Adult Top 40 (Billboard)	40
US Adult Alternative Songs (Billboard)	10
US Hot Rock Songs (Billboard)	15

== Certifications ==
Region	Certification	Certified units/sales
Australia (ARIA)	Platinum	70,000^{‡}
Brazil (Pro-Música Brasil)	Gold	30,000^{‡}
Canada (Music Canada)	4× Platinum	320,000^{‡}
Denmark (IFPI Danmark)	Gold	45,000^{‡}
Italy (FIMI)	Gold	25,000^{‡}
New Zealand (RMNZ)	4× Platinum	120,000^{‡}
United Kingdom (BPI)	2× Platinum	1,200,000^{‡}
United States (RIAA)	2× Platinum	2,000,000^{‡}
^{‡} Sales+streaming figures based on certification alone.

== Release history ==
Region	Date	Format	Label
United Kingdom	11 May 2015	Contemporary hit radio	Rubyworks; Columbia
United States	19 May 2015	Modern rock radio	Columbia
