= Hozier (album) =

Studio album by Hozier
- Released: 19 September 2014
- Venue: Greystones, Ireland (Note: Cherry Wine (Live))
- Studio: The Attic (Wicklow, Ireland); Cauldron (Dublin); Westland (Dublin); Exchequer (Dublin)
- Genre: Blues; soul; indie rock
- Length: 53:26
- Label: Rubyworks; Island
- Producer: Hozier; Rob Kirwan

Hozier chronology
| From Eden (2014) | Hozier (2014) | Nina Cried Power (2018) |

Singles from Hozier
- 1. "From Eden" Released: 9 March 2014; 2. "Sedated" Released: 20 May 2014; 3. "Work Song" Released: 16 March 2015; 4. "Cherry Wine" Released: 14 February 2016

Hozier is the debut studio album by Irish musician Hozier. It was released on 19 September 2014 by Island Records and Rubyworks Records. Before the album's release, he attracted attention from his 2013 and 2014 EPs Take Me to Church (2013) and From Eden (2014), which contained songs that were later included on the album. Hozier collaborated with producer Rob Kirwan during its recording. Hozier has been described as a blues, soul and indie rock album with elements of gospel, R&B and folk music.

Hozier received positive reviews from music critics, many of whom praised Hozier's songwriting and vocal performance. The record was also commercially successful, reaching top ten positions in several countries, including Ireland, the United Kingdom, the United States, Canada, Australia, New Zealand, the Netherlands, Denmark and Sweden. Five of the album's singles—"Take Me to Church", "From Eden", "Sedated", "Work Song", and "Someone New"—charted in the top-50 of the Irish Singles Chart. The album's lead single, "Take Me to Church", was a huge success worldwide and also earned a nomination for Song of the Year at the 57th Annual Grammy Awards in 2015. Following the release of the record, "Jackie and Wilson" and "Cherry Wine" were released as the album's sixth and seventh singles, respectively.

== Background ==
Hozier began writing songs at the age of 15. He taught himself guitar and sang in his school choir. He later studied music education at Trinity College Dublin but was refused a year's deferral by the college after missing exams to record demos for a music label. While at Trinity, Hozier became involved with the Trinity Orchestra. He was a member of the choral ensemble Anúna from 2007 to 2012 and appears as a soloist on their 2014 release Illuminations singing "La Chanson de Mardi Gras". He toured and sang with the group internationally including performances in Norway and the Netherlands. Hozier played at Oxegen Festival in 2009 and 2010. In 2011, he opened up for a performance for Alex Winston in Dublin. In 2012, Hozier appeared as a backup singer for Billy Ocean.

== Writing and recording ==
Hozier began writing the album after ending his first relationship, saying it forced him to "reflect" upon what being in love meant, having reasons to "distract" himself and "cultivate his ideas" before "turn(ing) them into music". Hozier has stated that there are "a lot of recurring themes" in the album dealing with "personal liberations - finding yourself, accepting yourself, and making sense of yourself" in trying to be honest about "the more wonderful and awful things of your day-to-day". He describes his initial efforts as "angsty, lonely songwriting that teenagers do". He wrote "Take Me to Church" in his parents' living room and recorded the song in a "makeshift attic studio" in Wicklow, collaborating with producer Rob Kirwan. At a live performance in Boston, Hozier explained that "Cherry Wine" was recorded at five in the morning in an old, abandoned hotel with a caved-in roof and walls covered in graffiti. The cover artwork is a painting made by Hozier's mother Raine Hozier-Byrne, who also did the artworks of the album's singles.

== Music and lyrics ==
Hozier is a blues, soul and indie rock record, featuring elements of gospel, R&B and folk. The album contains an "Americana-rock blend with oily guitar riffs, crashing high-hats, angelic choruses and sung-spoken verses...", characterized by subtle guitar, strong percussion, dark instrumentals, whimsical strings, "soulful" and raw vocals and "haunting" melodies". The standard edition of Hozier is just under an hour long, consisting of thirteen tracks, while the deluxe edition adds four bonus songs to the record. The album was solely written by Hozier, except "Someone New", which was co-written with his former girlfriend Sallay-Matu Garnett. The album was produced by Hozier and Rob Kirwan.

=== Songs ===
"Take Me to Church"
Take Me to Church is a gospel-blues track which contrasts the nature of romantic love and devotion with the constraints of Catholicism.

Hozier opens with "Take Me to Church", a gospel-inflected mid-tempo blues song with "sweeping orchestral choruses" showcasing the artist's vocal range ascribing religious terminology to the nuances of a romantic relationship. "Angel of Small Death and the Codeine Scene" is a blues and indie-rock track, containing guitar riffs, clapping hands, and church organs with a half-time beat, describing a "temptress" in "stained-glass colors", lamenting the unavoidable "curse of being young in love". "Jackie and Wilson" is a bluesy, laid-back soulful rockabilly track, backed by an "angelic choir of harmonies, a tribute to American singer Jackie Wilson. It features "tongue-in-cheek" lyrics musing about a couple "naming their children Jackie and Wilson" while "rais[ing] them on rhythm and blues." "Someone New" is a pop-like whimsical spring-stepped indie-rock song with strong strings, a pizzicato bass and choral harmonies, discussing a wandering celebration of "renewed love" in the face of strangers. "To Be Alone" is melancholy blues song containing a simplistic drumbeat guitar licks and church organs, depicting the "euphoric" attraction of solitude with a partner.

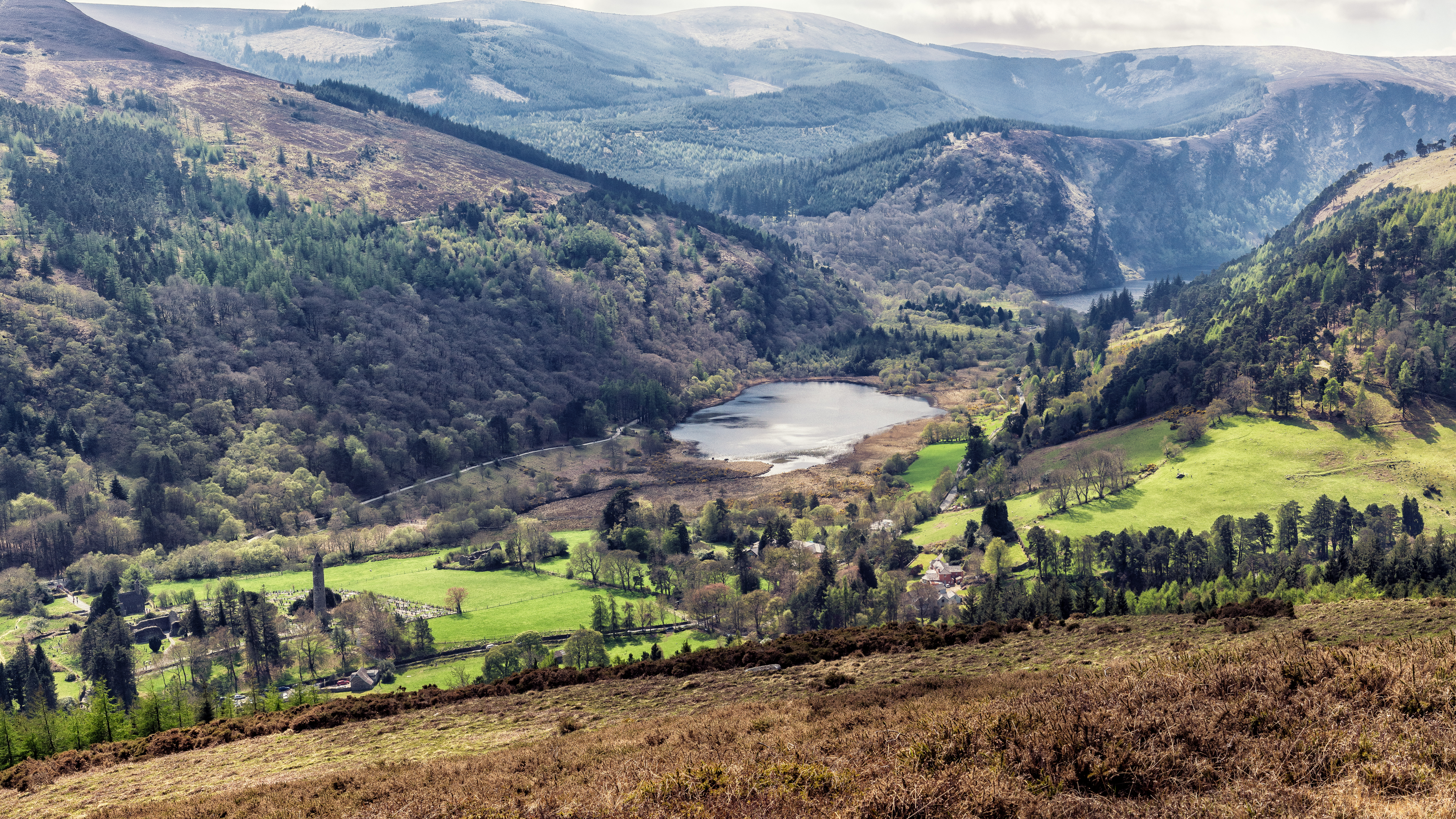
"In a Week" is a romantic ballad telling of a couple decomposing together amidst the Wicklow Mountains.

"From Eden" features a flamenco bridge, referencing the titular garden in its Biblical imagery and describing a journey to "find himself as much as the girl", with the narrator "slithering" to his lover's door. "In a Week" is a Celtic-inspired folk duet with breathy harmonies from Karen Cowley detailing pastoral fantasy about decomposing amongst the fauna of the Wicklow Mountains alongside his love. "Sedated" is a soulful track with tinkling piano and gospel melodies with depicts a "warning" of personal decay within a relationship. "Work Song" is a gothic-spiritual love song with murmurous vocals, tambourine, and a strong melodic bass, discussing a promise of devotion beyond the grave. "Like Real People Do" is an acoustic song in a "warm" higher key with keening vocals, its lyrics intertwining metaphors of insects and nature, while pleading for his sweetheart to kiss him in affection. "It Will Come Back" is a twangy track with "devilish" strings slide guitar riffs and tambourines with deviant notations while "Foreigner's God" has a soulful edge with loaded lyrical and religious allegories. "Cherry Wine" ends the album on an apologetic note with an intimate acoustic live-recording that juxtaposes the samples of chirping birds and soft guitar with the description of a tempestuous, abusive relationship.

== Release and promotion ==
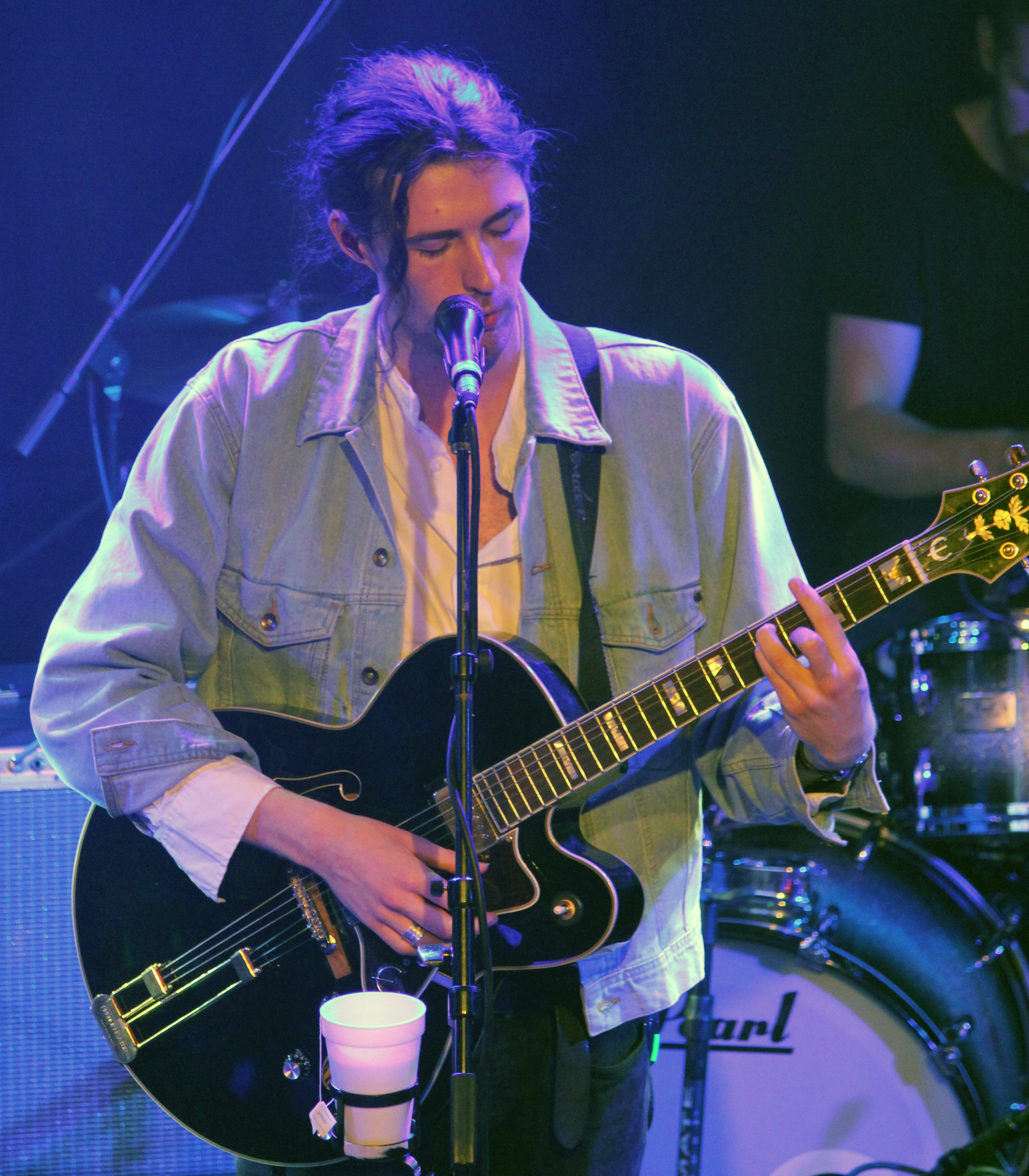
Hozier performing in West Hollywood while promoting the album on tour of United States and Europe.

The album was available to pre-order in Europe upon its announcement with North American and Australian pre-order dates from July 2014. The album was released 19 September 2014. The album was distributed by Island Records in most of the world and by Columbia Records in the United States, Canada and Australia.

=== Singles ===
"Take Me to Church" was announced by Hozier as the lead single from the album and was released on 13 September 2013. The song peaked at #2 on the Billboard Hot 100, becoming Hozier's highest-charting single in the U.S. to that date. The music video, alluding to themes of homophobia, was released that same month, having been created on a "shoestring budget" and filmed entirely in black-and-white. The video was shared by gay English actor Stephen Fry, which helped it reach the front page of Reddit and subsequently go viral. "Take Me to Church" saw Hozier's rise to prominence, with the song scoring top five positions around the world and gaining multi-platinum certifications; the song also garnered critical acclaim for its lyricism and messaging.

"From Eden" was released as the second single from the album on 9 March 2014. The song peaked at #2 on the Irish Singles Chart. "Sedated" was released as the third single from the album on 20 May 2014. The song peaked at #3 on the Irish Singles Chart. "Work Song" was released as the fourth single from the album on 16 March 2015. "Someone New" was released as the fifth single from the album on 11 May 2015. The song peaked at #13 on the Irish Singles Chart. "Jackie and Wilson" was released as the sixth single from the album on 29 September 2015. "Cherry Wine" was released as the seventh single from the album on 14 February 2016. The track appeared in Zach Braff's movie Wish I Was Here, chosen for its "heartbreaking lyrics and poetry". It was later performed on the Late Late Show.

=== Tour ===
Hozier toured the United States and Europe in support of the album across 2014 and 2015, with multiple shows featuring opening act Ásgeir. Irish band Wyvern Lingo opened for his performances in Ireland.

== Critical reception ==
Professional ratings
Aggregate scores
| Source | Rating |
|---|---|
| AnyDecentMusic? | 7.7/10 |
| Metacritic | 79/100 |
Review scores
| Source | Rating |
| AllMusic | 3.5/5 stars |
| The Arts Desk | 3/5 stars |
| The A.V. Club | B |
| Clash | 8/10 |
| Entertainment Weekly | A− |
| Exclaim! | 9/10 |
| The Irish Times | 5/5 stars |
| Rolling Stone | 3.5/5 stars |
| State | 4/5 stars |
| The Telegraph | 5/5 stars |

Hozier received generally positive reviews from music critics. At Metacritic, which assigns a normalized rating out of 100 to reviews from mainstream critics, the album received an average score of 79, based on 10 reviews.

AllMusic's Timothy Monger called the album "a strong debut", praising the singer's soulful voice and the quality of the material. "Like fellow Irishman Van Morrison did decades before, Hozier draws on the soul and R&B of Jackie Wilson and runs it through the mystery white-boy filter of Jeff Buckley, adding a touch of Bon Iver's rural indie aesthetic to mix into his own dark cocktail", he wrote. Sergiusz Królak of JazzSoul.pl claimed, "Hozier (...) revealed album with emotionally strong songs," adding that "acoustic-rock-ballad tracklist makes a great whole with deep-emotional vocal and strong lyrics".

Simon Harper of Clash magazine commented that "His voice, more poitín-sweetened than whiskey-soaked, caresses delicate melodies and rougher rhythms alike with confidence – it lingers compellingly in the creeping blues of 'To Be Alone', whispers prettily in the folky 'Like Real People Do', and preaches fervently in the ragged R&B of 'Jackie And Wilson'. The Irishman's storytelling is suitably fluid, relying on the realism of true romance rather than affecting any impoverished Delta designs. As a result, 'Hozier' is an authentic portrait of an artist – soulful, spiritual and seductive – and is a deeply impressive first step."

Rolling Stone magazine's Jon Dolan wrote, "Blessed with a sensual singing voice and a seemingly bottomless well of lapsed-Catholic-style conflict, Hozier channels Van Morrison's Celtic R&B, Southern soul and Black Keys-style garage blues into intimately roiling songs like 'Angel of Small Death and the Codeine Scene'." Helen Brown of The Telegraph noted, "Gospel choirs hum and swell tenderly beneath the rougher edges of his riffs. They add mature, universal gravitas and often a holy ecstacy to an intense, youthful lyrical tangling of religion and romantic obsession that regularly finds him poised 'between love and abuse'," adding that "Hozier mixes his tormented blues with sunny R&B."

== Accolades ==
"Take Me to Church" received a nomination for the category Song of the Year at the 57th Grammy Awards while Hozier was nominated for the category Top Rock Album at the 2015 Billboard Music Awards and International Album of the Year at the 2016 Juno Awards. Hozier won Best Album at the European Border Breakers Awards, a prize recognising the achievements of international artists outside their home country. Jessica Goodman and Ryan Kistobak of The Huffington Post included the album on their list of 2014's best releases.

== Commercial performance ==
Hozier peaked at number two on the Billboard 200 and number three on the UK Albums and ARIA Charts. The album ranked at number one on the Rock Albums Chart and the Americana/Folk Chart. The album debuted at number two on the Canadian Albums Chart, selling 8,800 copies in its first week. Hozier also secured Top 15 chart positions in Belgium, Denmark, Holland, and Germany.

As of March 2019, the album has sold 972,000 copies and has earned 2.6 million equivalent album units in the U.S. In Hozier's home country of Ireland, the record debuted at number one with 7,300 copies sold, making it the country's fastest-selling debut album by a male artist of the 2010s. It has sold 90,000 copies there.

== Track listing ==
All tracks are written by Andrew Hozier-Byrne, except where noted.

Hozier – Standard edition
| No. | Title | Writer(s) | Length |
|---|---|---|---|
| 1. | "Take Me to Church" | | 4:02 |
| 2. | "Angel of Small Death and the Codeine Scene" | | 3:39 |
| 3. | "Jackie and Wilson" | | 3:43 |
| 4. | "Someone New" | Hozier-Byrne; Sallay Matu Garnett | 3:43 |
| 5. | "To Be Alone" | | 5:24 |
| 6. | "From Eden" | | 4:43 |
| 7. | "In a Week" (featuring Karen Cowley) | | 5:18 |
| 8. | "Sedated" | | 3:28 |
| 9. | "Work Song" | | 3:50 |
| 10. | "Like Real People Do" | | 3:18 |
| 11. | "It Will Come Back" | | 4:38 |
| 12. | "Foreigner's God" | | 3:45 |
| 13. | "Cherry Wine" (Live) | | 4:00 |
| Total length: | | | 53:31 |

Hozier – Deluxe edition disc 2 (bonus tracks)
| No. | Title | Writer(s) | Length |
|---|---|---|---|
| 1. | "In the Woods Somewhere" | | 5:31 |
| 2. | "Run" | | 4:14 |
| 3. | "Arsonist's Lullabye" | | 4:26 |
| 4. | "My Love Will Never Die" | Willie Dixon | 3:55 |
| Total length: | | | 71:32 |

Hozier – iTunes Festival deluxe edition disc 3 (bonus tracks)
| No. | Title | Length |
|---|---|---|
| 1. | "Like Real People Do" (Live at iTunes Festival, London / 2014) | 3:22 |
| 2. | "Angel of Small Death & the Codeine Scene" (Live at iTunes Festival, London / 2014) | 3:38 |
| 3. | "Jackie and Wilson" (Live at iTunes Festival, London / 2014) | 3:38 |
| 4. | "To Be Alone" (Live at iTunes Festival, London / 2014) | 5:33 |
| 5. | "Someone New" (Live at iTunes Festival, London / 2014) | 4:23 |
| 6. | "Work Song" (Live at iTunes Festival, London / 2014) | 4:02 |
| Total length: | | 96:08 |

Hozier – Special edition disc 2 (bonus tracks)
| No. | Title | Writer(s) | Length |
|---|---|---|---|
| 5. | "From Eden" (Live) | | 4:28 |
| 6. | "Jackie and Wilson" (Live) | | 3:58 |
| 7. | "Someone New" (Live) | | 4:20 |
| 8. | "Work Song" (Live) | | 4:09 |
| 9. | "Take Me to Church" (Live) | | 4:20 |
| 10. | "Problem / Regulate" (BBC Live Lounge) | Max Martin; Savan Kotecha; Ilya Salmanzadeh; Amethyst Kelly; Ariana Grande; Warren Griffin; Nathaniel Hale | 3:34 |
| 11. | "Whole Lotta Love" (The Dermot O'Leary Saturday Sessions Show) | John Bonham; Willie Dixon; John Paul Jones; Jimmy Page; Robert Plant | 3:02 |
| 12. | "Do I Wanna Know?" (Live at the BBC) | Alex Turner; Jamie Cook; Nick O'Malley; Matt Helders | 4:17 |
| 13. | "Lay Me Down" (BBC Live Lounge) | Sam Smith; James Napier; Elvin Smith | 3:36 |
| Total length: | | | 107:56 |

Hozier – Target deluxe edition disc 2 (bonus tracks)
| No. | Title | Writer(s) | Length |
|---|---|---|---|
| 1. | "Problem / Regulate" (BBC Live Version) | Martin; Kotecha; Salmanzadeh; Kelly; Grande; Griffin; Hale | 3:34 |
| 2. | "Illinois Blues" (Live) | Skip James | 3:26 |
| 3. | "Whole Lotta Love" (BBC Live Version) | Bonham; Dixon; Jones; Page; Plant | 3:02 |
| 4. | "Do I Wanna Know?" (BBC Live Version) | Turner; Cook; O'Malley; Helders | 4:17 |
| Total length: | | | 67:45 |

== Personnel ==
Credits adapted from Hozier liner notes, except where noted.

Musicians

- Andrew Hozier-Byrne – vocals, guitar, piano, synthesizer, organ; bass (track 2)
- Karen Cowley – vocals (track 7)
- Alex Ryan – bass (tracks 3–12); piano (tracks 3, 4, 12)
- Ken Rice – violin, viola (track 4)
- Kate Ellis – cello (tracks 4–7, 11, 12)
- Matt Rafter – additional cello (track 6)
- Andre Antunes – drums (tracks 6, 9); percussion (tracks 6, 8, 9)
- Rory Doyle – drums, percussion (tracks 2–5, 7, 8, 11, 12)
- Fiachra Kinder – drums, percussion (tracks 1, 2, 10)
- Rob Kirwan – additional percussion (track 8)

Additional personnel

- Mark James – design
- Raine Hozier-Byrne – artwork
- Steven Appleby – fonts, logo

Technical

- Andrew Hozier-Byrne – producer (all tracks), mixing (track 13)
- Rob Kirwan – producer (all except 13), engineer, mixing (track 1)
- Niall Muckian – direction
- Andrew Scheps – mixing (tracks 2–12)
- Stephen Marcussen – mastering

== Charts ==
=== Weekly charts ===
Weekly chart performance for Hozier
| Chart (2014–2017) | Peak position |
|---|---|
| Australian Albums (ARIA) | 3 |
| Austrian Albums (Ö3 Austria) | 22 |
| Belgian Albums (Ultratop Flanders) | 2 |
| Belgian Albums (Ultratop Wallonia) | 28 |
| Canadian Albums (Billboard) | 2 |
| Czech Albums (ČNS IFPI) | 20 |
| Danish Albums (Hitlisten) | 9 |
| Dutch Albums (Album Top 100) | 7 |
| Finnish Albums (Suomen virallinen lista) | 34 |
| French Albums (SNEP) | 18 |
| German Albums (Offizielle Top 100) | 14 |
| Greek Albums (IFPI Greece) | 2 |
| Irish Albums (IRMA) | 1 |
| Italian Albums (FIMI) | 7 |
| Latvian Albums (LaIPA) | 92 |
| New Zealand Albums (RMNZ) | 3 |
| Norwegian Albums (VG-lista) | 11 |
| Polish Albums (ZPAV) | 1 |
| Portuguese Albums (AFP) | 29 |
| Scottish Albums (OCC) | 3 |
| Spanish Albums (Promusicae) | 77 |
| Swedish Albums (Sverigetopplistan) | 6 |
| Swiss Albums (Schweizer Hitparade) | 14 |
| UK Albums (OCC) | 3 |
| UK Album Downloads (OCC) | 3 |
| US Billboard 200 | 2 |
| US Top Alternative Albums (Billboard) | 1 |
| US Digital Albums (Billboard) | 2 |
| US Americana/Folk Albums (Billboard) | 1 |
| US Top Rock Albums (Billboard) | 1 |
| US Indie Store Album Sales (Billboard) | 4 |

=== Year-end charts ===
Year-end chart performance for Hozier
| Chart (2014) | Position |
|---|---|
| Belgian Albums (Ultratop Flanders) | 81 |
| Irish Albums (IRMA) | 2 |
| US Billboard 200 | 137 |
| US Alternative Albums (Billboard) | 16 |
| US Folk Albums (Billboard) | 2 |
| US Top Rock Albums (Billboard) | 27 |
| Chart (2015) | Position |
| Australian Albums (ARIA) | 12 |
| Belgian Albums (Ultratop Flanders) | 43 |
| Belgian Albums (Ultratop Wallonia) | 92 |
| Canadian Albums (Billboard) | 6 |
| Danish Albums (Hitlisten) | 25 |
| Dutch Albums (MegaCharts) | 41 |
| French Albums (SNEP) | 115 |
| Irish Albums (IRMA) | 3 |
| Italian Albums (FIMI) | 64 |
| New Zealand Albums (RMNZ) | 12 |
| Swedish Albums (Sverigetopplistan) | 15 |
| Swiss Albums (Schweizer Hitparade) | 49 |
| UK Albums (OCC) | 12 |
| US Billboard 200 | 12 |
| US Americana/Folk Albums (Billboard) | 1 |
| US Top Rock Albums (Billboard) | 2 |
| Chart (2016) | Position |
| Danish Albums (Hitlisten) | 82 |
| UK Albums (OCC) | 75 |
| US Billboard 200 | 85 |
| US Top Rock Albums (Billboard) | 39 |
| Chart (2017) | Position |
| US Billboard 200 | 190 |
| US Americana/Folk Albums (Billboard) | 6 |
| US Top Rock Albums (Billboard) | 33 |
| Chart (2018) | Position |
| Irish Albums (IRMA) | 33 |
| US Top Rock Albums (Billboard) | 38 |
| Chart (2019) | Position |
| Irish Albums (IRMA) | 36 |
| US Top Rock Albums (Billboard) | 39 |
| Chart (2020) | Position |
| Irish Albums (IRMA) | 35 |
| US Top Rock Albums (Billboard) | 24 |
| Chart (2021) | Position |
| Irish Albums (IRMA) | 35 |
| US Billboard 200 | 183 |
| US Top Rock Albums (Billboard) | 26 |
| Chart (2023) | Position |
| Belgian Albums (Ultratop Flanders) | 176 |
| Dutch Albums (Album Top 100) | 85 |
| Icelandic Albums (Tónlistinn) | 92 |
| US Billboard 200 | 107 |
| US Top Rock Albums (Billboard) | 14 |
| Chart (2024) | Position |
| Australian Albums (ARIA) | 51 |
| Belgian Albums (Ultratop Flanders) | 89 |
| Canadian Albums (Billboard) | 47 |
| Dutch Albums (Album Top 100) | 60 |
| Icelandic Albums (Tónlistinn) | 67 |
| UK Albums (OCC) | 80 |
| US Billboard 200 | 72 |
| Chart (2025) | Position |
| Australian Albums (ARIA) | 30 |
| Belgian Albums (Ultratop Flanders) | 71 |
| Canadian Albums (Billboard) | 37 |
| Dutch Albums (Album Top 100) | 67 |
| Icelandic Albums (Tónlistinn) | 70 |
| UK Albums (OCC) | 65 |
| US Billboard 200 | 52 |
| US Top Rock & Alternative Albums (Billboard) | 9 |

=== Decade-end charts ===
Decade-end chart performance for Hozier
| Chart (2010–2019) | Position |
|---|---|
| US Billboard 200 | 120 |

== Certifications and sales ==
Certifications and sales for Hozier
| Region | Certification | Certified units/sales |
|---|---|---|
| Australia (ARIA) | 2× Platinum | 140,000^{‡} |
| Austria (IFPI Austria) | Platinum | 15,000^{*} |
| Canada (Music Canada) | 7× Platinum | 560,000^{‡} |
| Denmark (IFPI Danmark) | 3× Platinum | 60,000^{‡} |
| France (SNEP) | Platinum | 100,000^{‡} |
| Germany (BVMI) | Gold | 100,000^{‡} |
| Ireland | — | 90,000 |
| Italy (FIMI) | Platinum | 50,000^{‡} |
| Netherlands (NVPI) | Platinum | 40,000^{^} |
| New Zealand (RMNZ) | 7× Platinum | 105,000^{‡} |
| Norway (IFPI Norway) | Platinum | 30,000^{‡} |
| Poland (ZPAV) | 2× Platinum | 40,000^{‡} |
| Portugal (AFP) | Gold | 3,500^{‡} |
| Singapore (RIAS) | Gold | 5,000^{*} |
| Sweden (GLF) | Platinum | 40,000^{‡} |
| United Kingdom (BPI) | 3× Platinum | 900,000^{‡} |
| United States (RIAA) | 4× Platinum | 4,000,000^{‡} |
Summaries
| Worldwide | — | 1,000,000 |
^{*} Sales figures based on certification alone.^{^} Shipments figures based on certification alone.^{‡} Sales+streaming figures based on certification alone.

== Release history ==
Release history and formats for Hozier
| Region | Date | Format | Edition | Label | Ref. |
|---|---|---|---|---|---|
| Ireland | 19 September 2014 | CD; LP; digital download | Standard | Rubyworks; Island | |
| United Kingdom | 6 October 2014 | CD; LP; digital download | Standard | Rubyworks; Island | |
| United States | 14 October 2014 | CD; LP; digital download | Standard | Rubyworks; Columbia | |
| Various | 26 January 2015 | Digital download (iTunes Store exclusive) | iTunes Festival deluxe | Rubyworks; Island | |
| United States | 16 June 2015 | LP (Target exclusive) | Deluxe | Rubyworks; Columbia | |
| Various | 6 November 2015 | CD; digital download | Special | Rubyworks; Island | |
