= From Eden =

2014 song performed by Hozier

Single by Hozier

from the album Hozier
- Released: 9 March 2014
- Recorded: 2013
- Genre: Soul rock, blues rock
- Length: 4:43
- Label: Rubyworks; Island
- Songwriter: Andrew Hozier-Byrne
- Producers: Rob Kirwan; Andrew Hozier-Byrne

Hozier singles chronology
| "Take Me to Church" (2013) | "From Eden" (2014) | "Sedated" (2014) |

Alternative cover
- EP cover

Music video
- "From Eden" on YouTube

"From Eden" is a song recorded by Irish singer-songwriter Hozier for his 2014 eponymous debut studio album. It was released on 9 March 2014 as the second single from the record and peaked at number two on the Irish Singles Chart and number fifteen on the Billboard Hot Rock & Alternative Songs chart. An accompanying music video was released in November 2014, featuring actress Katie McGrath.

== Writing and composition ==
"From Eden" is the sixth track from the album and written by Hozier "From Eden" is one of the experimental tracks on the album, with Motown influences breaking down a flamenco bridge while returning to religious metaphor; the lyrics contain "torturous Biblical ponderings", with Hozier slithering from the Garden of Eden to confront a love he deems "familiar/like my mirror, years ago". The song is also distinctive for its 5/4 time signature.

== Critical reception ==
"From Eden" received praise from critics; The Irish Times commended the track for its "grit and substance" and exclaimed that Hozier's vocals contained a "blue-eyed, soulful delivery", while PopMatters stated that the song saw the Four Tops quartet "put their arms around young Hozier" as he realises a "journey as much about finding himself as it is about finding the girl."

== Commercial performance ==
The song peaked at number 15 on the Billboard Hot Rock & Alternative Songs chart and number 2 on the Irish Singles Chart. "From Eden" also scored within the Top 100 charting positions in the UK, Canada, and Belgium, respectively. "From Eden" is certified platinum in the United Kingdom and gold in Australia.

== Music video ==
Released on 18 November 2014, the official music video for "From Eden" was directed by filmmaking duo henry/ssong (Henry Chen and Ssong Yang). Actress Katie McGrath and child actor Tate Birchmore star alongside Hozier in the video, which contrasts a "life of crime" with the breezy melody and lyrics, resulting in conflicting emotional circumstances. It depicts Hozier as an outlaw with his companion, McGrath, and young boy they've taken into their company while on the run. Hozier robs a gas station and the trio commandeer a house in which to spend the night; the pair are subsequently caught, with the boy being taken from their custody. It is revealed that the couple had found the boy alone in a dilapidated house. The video has garnered over 65 million views on YouTube.

== Charts ==
=== Weekly charts ===
| Chart (2014–15) | Peak position |
|---|---|
| Belgium (Ultratip Bubbling Under Flanders) | 9 |
| Belgium (Ultratip Bubbling Under Wallonia) | 27 |
| Canada Rock (Billboard) | 32 |
| Ireland (IRMA) | 2 |
| UK Singles (OCC) | 69 |
| US Hot Rock & Alternative Songs (Billboard) | 15 |
| US Rock & Alternative Airplay (Billboard) | 37 |

=== Year-end charts ===
| Chart (2015) | Position |
|---|---|
| US Hot Rock Songs (Billboard) | 66 |

== Certifications ==
| Region | Certification | Certified units/sales |
|---|---|---|
| Australia (ARIA) | Gold | 35,000^{‡} |
| Brazil (Pro-Música Brasil) | Gold | 30,000^{‡} |
| Canada (Music Canada) | Platinum | 80,000^{‡} |
| United Kingdom (BPI) | Platinum | 600,000^{‡} |
| United States (RIAA) | Platinum | 1,000,000^{‡} |
^{‡} Sales+streaming figures based on certification alone.

== Release history ==
| Region | Date | Format | Label |
|---|---|---|---|
| Ireland | 9 March 2014 | Digital download (EP) | Universal |
| United States | 1 April 2014 | Digital download (EP) | Columbia |
| United States | 6 October 2014 | Adult album alternative radio | Columbia |
| United States | 10 February 2015 | Modern rock radio | Columbia |
