= Nina Cried Power (EP) =

- Digital cover. The cover of the physical edition features the title on the upper right corner, changing the image's position.

EP by Hozier
- Released: 7 September 2018
- Recorded: September 2017 – August 2018
- Length: 17:18
- Label: Columbia
- Producer: Rob Kirwan; Markus Dravs

Hozier chronology
Hozier (2014)	Nina Cried Power (2018)	Wasteland, Baby! (2019)

Singles from Nina Cried Power
- 1. "Nina Cried Power" Released: 6 September 2018

Professional ratings
Review scores
Source	Rating
AllMusic	3.5/5 stars

Nina Cried Power is the third extended play (EP) by the Irish musician Hozier. It was released on 7 September 2018. Its lead single "Nina Cried Power" featuring Mavis Staples is inspired by the legacies of artists like Nina Simone, Joni Mitchell, Billie Holiday, James Brown, Bob Dylan, Woody Guthrie, and Staples herself. The single was number one on the Billboard Adult Alternative Songs airplay chart. The EP was Hozier's first new release since his 2014 self-titled debut album.

== Recording ==
Booker T. Jones plays organ on the EP. It was produced by Markus Dravs and Rob Kirwan, who produced Hozier's debut.

== Track listing ==
All tracks are written by Andrew Hozier-Byrne.

No.	Title	Length
1.	"Nina Cried Power" (featuring Mavis Staples)	3:45
2.	"NFWMB"	4:19
3.	"Moment's Silence (Common Tongue)"	4:14
4.	"Shrike"	5:00
Total length:		17:18

== Personnel ==
Personnel taken from Nina Cried Power EP liner notes.

- Andrew Hozier-Byrne – vocals, guitar; synthesizer (1, 2, 4); Wurlitzer (1); shaker, bells (2); percussion (4); claps (1–3); snaps (2, 3);
- Lurine Cato – background vocals (1)
- Priscilla Jones-Campbell – background vocals (1)
- Markus Dravs – synthesizer (1), synth bass (1); claps (1); snaps (3)
- Alex Ryan – bass; piano (1–3); Wurlitzer, Rhodes piano (2); keyboards, percussion (4); claps (1); snaps (3)
- Rory Doyle – drums (1–3); percussion (4); claps (1); snaps (3)
- Booker T. Jones – organ (1–3)
- Paul Clarvis – shaker, tambourine (1)
- Mavis Staples – vocals (1)
- Sarah Lynch – violin (4)

== Charts ==
Chart performance for Nina Cried Power EP
Chart (2018)	Peak position
Canadian Albums (Billboard)	33
US Billboard 200	60
US Top Alternative Albums (Billboard)	5
US Digital Albums (Billboard)	10
US Americana/Folk Albums (Billboard)	2
US Top Rock Albums (Billboard)	8
