= Work Song (Hozier song) =

2015 song by Hozier

Single by Hozier

from the album Hozier
- Released: 16 March 2015
- Recorded: 2013
- Genre: Soul; blues; gospel
- Length: 3:49
- Label: Rubyworks; Island
- Songwriter: Andrew Hozier-Byrne
- Producers: Rob Kirwan; Andrew Hozier-Byrne

Hozier singles chronology
"Sedated" (2014)	"Work Song" (2015)	"Someone New" (2015)

Music video
- "Work Song" on YouTube

"Work Song" is a song recorded by Irish singer-songwriter Hozier for his 2014 eponymous debut studio album. It was released on 16 March 2015 as the fifth single from the record, appearing on the Irish Singles Chart and Billboard Hot Rock & Alternative Songs chart. An accompanying music video was released in March 2015. The song appeared in the fifteenth episode of the eighth season of the American procedural drama 9-1-1.

== Promotion and release ==
On 5 March 2015, Hozier played the song on The Tonight Show Starring Jimmy Fallon. The song impacted United States Rock Radio on 16 March 2015. "Work Song" was featured in the trailer for George Tillman Jr.'s 2015 film adaptation of The Longest Ride, a novel by Nicholas Sparks as well an episode of NBC's occult drama Constantine.

== Writing and composition ==
"Work Song" is a gospel-blues song listed as the ninth track on the album, written by Hozier. Hozier cites the song as one of his favorites from the record. "Work Song" has "nuances of soul" with a "strong melodic bass", composed of percussion, tambourines, guitar, and "murmurous" vocals, while the lyrics describe a love of "undying sweetness" and devotion. The song possesses gospel backing vocals and church-like hand-claps, with literary themes of love, sin, and religion returning to the record.

== Critical reception ==
"Work Song" received acclaim from critics; The Arts Desk described it as an "elegiac spiritual head-nodder" that Hozier sings through with "easy familiarity", while The Irish Times described it as "mental-good", establishing him as "far from the boilerplate soul/blues of today". It is often cited as one of the strongest tracks on Hozier.

== Commercial performance ==
The song peaked at number 15 on Billboard Hot Rock & Alternative Songs, spending twelve weeks on the chart and appeared within the top twenty on the Bubbling Under Hot 100 and Adult Alternative Songs charts, respectively.

== Music video ==
The official music video for "Work Song" was released on 23 March 2015. Hozier shot the video the day after the Grammy Awards, and reportedly woke up with an "outrageous hangover" during the shoot. The video features him performing for a crowd, where the audience begins to break out into synchronized, slow, dancing, that "verges on performance art", embodying the romantic lyrics of the track. The video has amassed over 118 million views on YouTube.

== Charts ==
=== Weekly charts ===
2014–2015 weekly chart performance for "Work Song"
Chart (2014–2015)	Peak position
Ireland (IRMA)	47
US Bubbling Under Hot 100 (Billboard)	20
US Hot Rock & Alternative Songs (Billboard)	15
US Adult Alternative Airplay (Billboard)	15

2023–2024 weekly chart performance for "Work Song"
Chart (2023–2024)	Peak position
Canada Hot 100 (Billboard)	92
Ireland (IRMA)	39

=== Year-end charts ===
Year-end chart performance for "Work Song"
Chart (2015)	Position
US Hot Rock Songs (Billboard)	65

== Certifications ==
Certifications for "Work Song"
Region	Certification	Certified units/sales
Brazil (Pro-Música Brasil)	Gold	30,000^{‡}
Canada (Music Canada)	5× Platinum	400,000^{‡}
New Zealand (RMNZ)	4× Platinum	120,000^{‡}
United Kingdom (BPI)	Platinum	600,000^{‡}
United States (RIAA)	4× Platinum	4,000,000^{‡}
^{‡} Sales+streaming figures based on certification alone.

== Release history ==
Release history and formats for "Work Song"
Region	Date	Format	Label
United States	16 March 2015	Adult album alternative radio	Columbia
United States	17 March 2015	Modern rock radio	Columbia
