= Sedated (song) =

2014 song performed by Hozier

Single by Hozier

from the album Hozier
- Released: 20 May 2014
- Recorded: 2013
- Genre: Indie rock; soul; pop rock
- Length: 3:27
- Label: Rubyworks; Island; Columbia
- Songwriter: Andrew Hozier-Byrne
- Producers: Rob Kirwan; Andrew Hozier-Byrne

Hozier singles chronology
"From Eden" (2014)	"Sedated" (2014)	"Work Song" (2015)

"Sedated" is a song by recorded by Irish singer-songwriter Hozier for his 2014 eponymous debut studio album. It was released on 20 May 2014 as the third single from the record, and peaked at number three on the Irish Singles Chart.

== Writing and composition ==
"Sedated" is an indie-rock song listed as the eighth track on the album, written by Hozier alone. "Sedated" contains stripped-back instrumentation with uplifting piano, gospel choir melodies, and rich, dark vocals while the lyrics depict an "addictive love", warning of "creeping shadows, poison, and personal decay".

== Critical reception ==
"Sedated" was reviewed positively by music critics. VultureHound describes its "anthemic chorus", stating that the "simplicity of the track is something to love amongst the bombardment of [..] in modern music.", while State hails "Sedated" as "the most perfectly realised song released this year", writing that the track is "experienced in a way that transcends anything else on the album [...] it truly speaks for itself."

== Commercial performance ==
The song peaked at number five on the Billboard Ireland Digital Song Sales chart and number three on the Irish Singles Chart.

== Charts ==
Chart (2014)	Peak position
Ireland (IRMA)	3

== Release history ==
Region	Date	Format	Label
United States	20 May 2014	Digital download	Universal Music
