= Hozier =

Irish musician (born 1990)

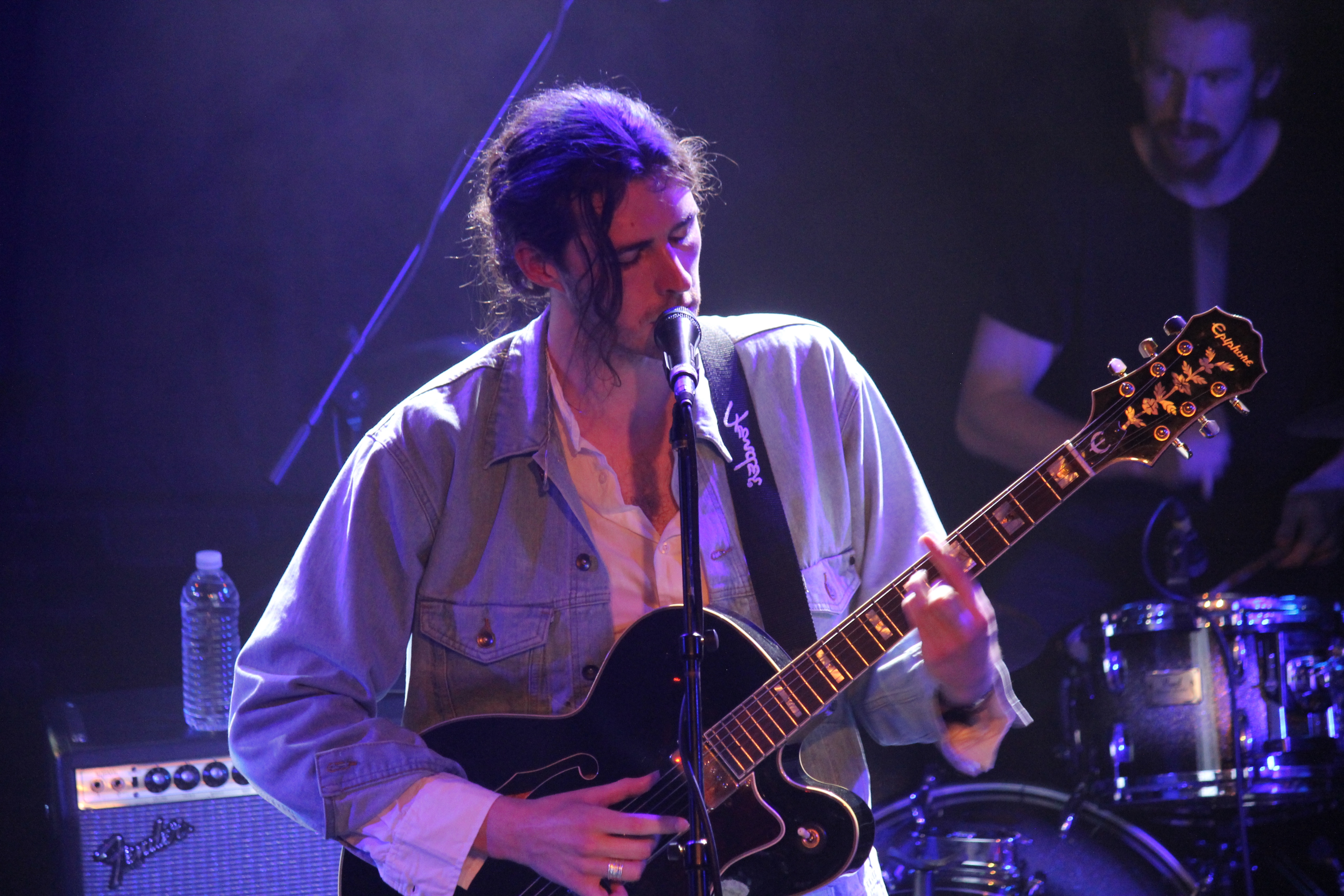
- Hozier performing in 2014

Background information
- Born: Andrew John Hozier-Byrne; 17 March 1990 (age 36); Newcastle, County Wicklow, Ireland
- Genres: Blues; rock; soul; folk; indie; R&B
- Occupations: Musician; singer; songwriter
- Instruments: Vocals; guitar; keyboards
- Works: Hozier discography
- Years active: 2008–present
- Labels: Rubyworks; Island; Columbia
- Formerly of: Anúna
- Website: hozier.com

Andrew John Hozier-Byrne (born 17 March 1990), known mononymously as Hozier (/ˈhoʊziər/ HOH-zee-ər), is an Irish singer and musician. His music primarily draws from folk, soul and blues, often using religious and literary themes and taking political or social justice stances.

His debut single, "Take Me to Church" (2013), became a rock radio hit in the U.S., peaked at number two on the Billboard Hot 100 and was certified multi-platinum in several countries. His eponymous debut studio album (2014) has been certified 6× platinum in Ireland and multi-platinum in several other countries. His EP Nina Cried Power (2018), which featured the title track as a single, reached number one on the Billboard Adult Alternative Songs chart.

His second album, Wasteland, Baby! (2019), debuted atop the Irish Albums Chart and the Billboard 200, and was certified gold in the U.S. In late 2022, Hozier collaborated with Bear McCreary on the song "Blood Upon the Snow" for the video game God of War: Ragnarök. His third studio album, Unreal Unearth (2023), was released on Rubyworks Records and debuted at number one on the Irish and UK charts. In 2024, he released the EP Unheard, which includes his first number-one single in Ireland, the US, and the UK, "Too Sweet". Time magazine named him one of the 100 most influential people in the world in 2025.

== Early life ==
Hozier was born near Bray, County Wicklow, Ireland on 17 March 1990, the son of Raine Hozier and John Byrne. He has one older brother named Jon. Around the time he was born, his father John worked as a local banker and in the evenings played as a jazz and blues drummer. His mother Raine was a stay-at-home artist. When Hozier was six years old, his father underwent spinal surgery, and although he survived despite numerous complications, he needed a wheelchair from then on. Hozier's father was unemployed for a few years, which put a severe financial strain on the family.

Hozier began writing songs at the age of 15, taught himself guitar and sang in his school choir. He was educated at Delgany National School. He was raised a Quaker. He later attended St. Gerard's School before studying music education at Trinity College Dublin. He missed exams to record demos for a music label and was refused a year's deferral by the college.

== Career ==
=== 2008–2012: Beginnings ===
While at Trinity, Hozier became involved with the Trinity Orchestra. He was a member of and toured with the choral ensemble Anúna from 2009 to 2012 and appeared as a soloist on their 2014 release Illuminations singing "La Chanson de Mardi Gras". Hozier played at the Oxegen 2009 and Oxegen 2010 festivals.

=== 2013–2017: Breakthrough ===
Hozier wrote the song "Take Me to Church" in 2013 in between playing open mic nights in Dublin; the rough demo resulted in him signing with indie label Rubyworks Records. Hozier released his debut extended play, also called Take Me to Church, on 3 July 2013. It appeared on the Billboard 200. He initially recorded track demos in his attic studio before working on the record with producer Rob Kirwan. The titular single was released in September 2013. The music video, alluding to themes of homophobia, was released that same month, having been created on a "shoestring budget" and filmed entirely in black-and-white. The video was shared by English actor Stephen Fry, which helped it reach the front page of Reddit and subsequently become a viral video. The song scored top-five chart positions and multi-platinum certifications; the song also garnered critical acclaim for its lyricism and messaging. The EP's concluding track, "Cherry Wine", appeared in Zach Braff's movie Wish I Was Here, chosen for its "heartbreaking lyrics and poetry". It was later performed on the Late Late Show. In March 2014, Hozier released his second EP, From Eden.

Hozier released his album Hozier on 19 September 2014, including tracks from his first two extended-play albums (EPs). The album drew inspiration from folk, R&B and blues music. Hozier met critical success; Helen Brown of The Daily Telegraph noted that it was "an intense, youthful lyrical tangling of religion and romantic obsession that regularly finds him poised 'between love and abuse'". Hozier peaked at number one in Ireland and finished second on the US Billboard 200. The album is certified 2× platinum in the UK and US. After the release of "Take Me to Church", the record released five singles released from 2014 to 2016: "From Eden", "Sedated", "Work Song", “Someone New", "Jackie and Wilson" and "Cherry Wine", which all appeared on the Irish Singles Chart. The music videos for "From Eden", "Someone New", and "Cherry Wine" featured actresses Katie McGrath, Natalie Dormer and Saoirse Ronan, respectively. In October 2014, he made his U.S. debut, performing "Take Me to Church" and "Angel of Small Death" on Saturday Night Live. In December 2014, he performed "Take Me to Church" at the Victoria's Secret Fashion Show.

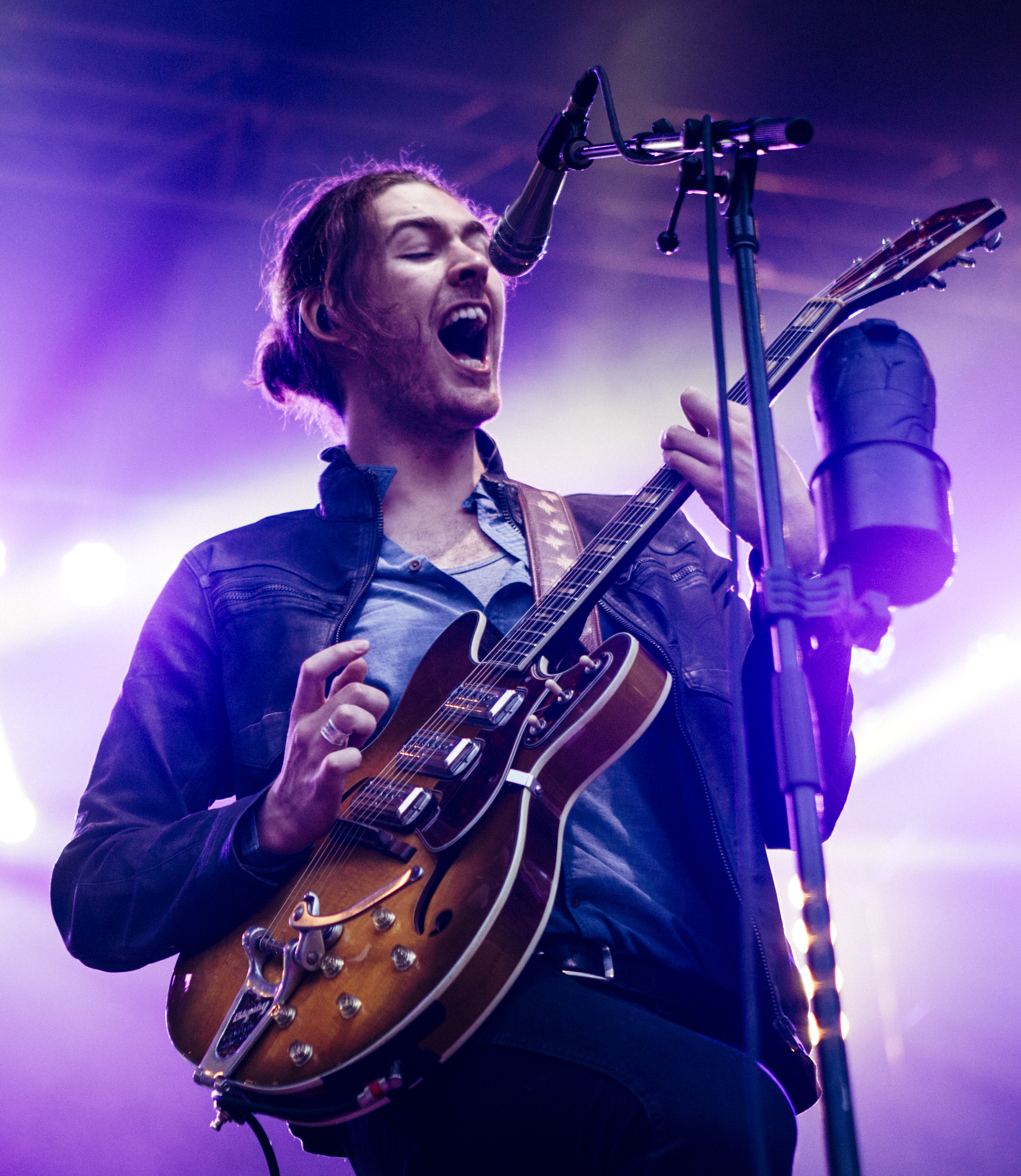
Hozier in 2015

In February 2015, "Take Me to Church" was nominated at the 57th Annual Grammy Awards for Song of the Year. At the awards show, he performed the song with Annie Lennox. He also performed it at the 2015 Billboard Music Awards in May 2015. On 12 November 2015, he won the VH1 Artist of the Year, a fan-voted award. At the ceremony, he performed "Take Me to Church" and The Beatles' "Blackbird" with singer Tori Kelly. In June 2016, Hozier released the song "Better Love" as part of the Legend of Tarzan soundtrack. Hozier subsequently took a one-year hiatus from his work, moving back to Ireland to "reconnect" after touring his debut album.

=== 2018–2021: Nina Cried Power EP and Wasteland, Baby! ===
In September 2018, Hozier returned with the release of the EP Nina Cried Power. The album features a collaboration with Mavis Staples on the titular track. He released his second studio album's lead single, "Movement", on 14 November 2018, alongside a music video. Hozier's second album, Wasteland, Baby!, was released on 1 March 2019, including tracks from his previous EP. The thematic elements of the album center around his interpretation of the apocalypse while looking for thematic elements of romance and redemption. Reviews were largely positive; Elisabeth Woronzoff of PopMatters stated it "light[s] the artist's skill and vision of his craft... [and] that it [..] delivers while edifying the artist as an impactful voice in the art and activism sphere." The album debuted atop the Irish Albums Chart and the Billboard 200, Hozier's first number-one US release. Wasteland, Baby! has since been certified silver in the United Kingdom and gold in the United States.

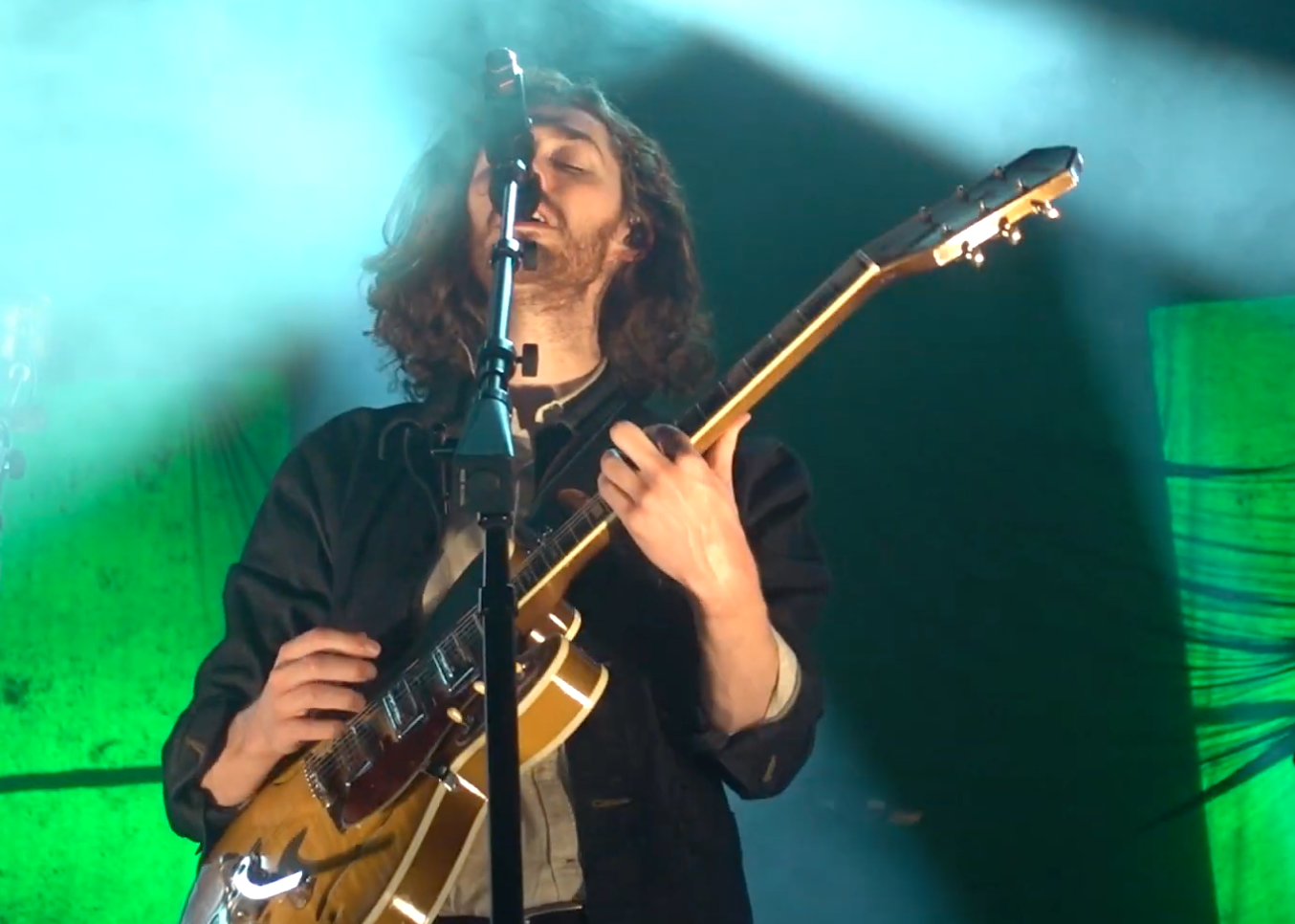
Hozier performing at the Glasgow Royal Concert Hall in 2019

Wasteland, Baby! included two further singles released in 2019 that debuted on the Irish Singles Chart: "Almost (Sweet Music)" and "Dinner and Diatribes"; the music video for the latter track features an appearance from actress Anya Taylor-Joy. He was the closing headliner of the inaugural Railbird Festival held on the grounds of the Keeneland horse track in Lexington, Kentucky. Hozier was one of the headliners for the Electric Picnic 2019, a three-day festival held in Ireland on 30 August to 1 September. He performed at the Glastonbury Festival 2019. He also performed at the Lollapalooza 2019, a four-day music festival held in Chicago in August.

In March and April 2020, during the COVID-19 pandemic, Hozier performed via social media to raise money and awareness for the Irish Society for the Prevention of Cruelty to Children (ISPCC). He performed a cover version of "The Parting Glass" on The Late Late Show and released the song as a charity single on streaming media, with proceeds going to the ISPCC. In June 2020, as part of the fundraising special, RTÉ Does Comic Relief, he performed a cover of "Bridge over Troubled Water" in Croke Park and performed a sketch with Irish comedian Aisling Bea.

On 29 October 2021, Hozier released the single "Tell It to My Heart" in collaboration with Meduza, which debuted at number 13 on the Irish Singles Chart.

=== 2022–present: Unreal Unearth and Unheard EP ===
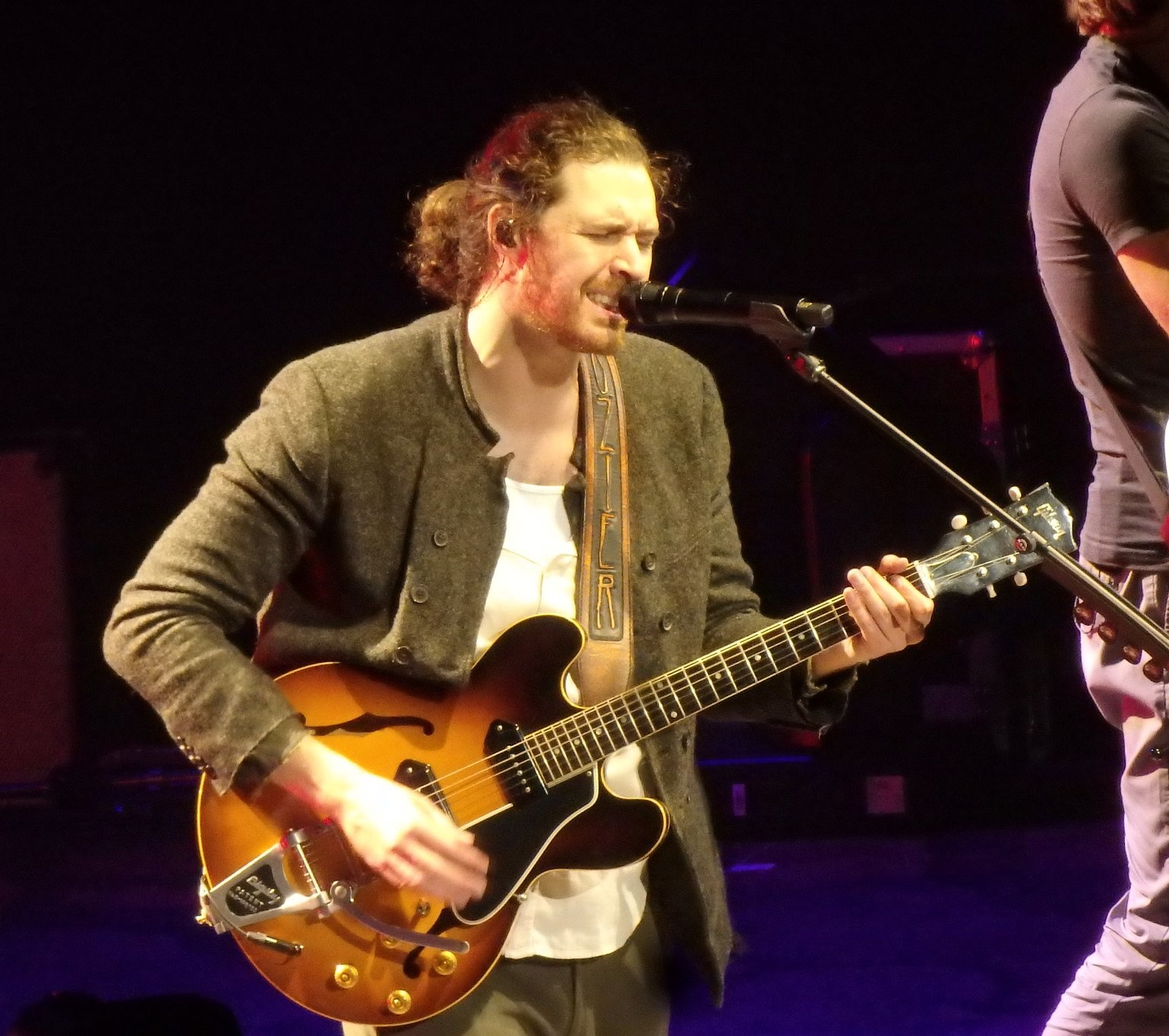
Hozier performing at Qudos Bank Arena in 2024

The single "Swan Upon Leda", released on 7 October 2022, was inspired by Egyptian feminist Mona Eltahawy as well as Dobbs v. Jackson Women's Health Organization in the United States and the Mahsa Amini protests in Iran. Atwood Magazine praised the song as "a haunting and heartbreakingly beautiful prayer, plea, and cry for reproductive rights and women’s empowerment."

"Blood Upon the Snow" was released on 9 November 2022, as a collaboration with composer Bear McCreary for the video game God of War Ragnarök. He released the extended play Eat Your Young on 17 March 2023. The EP features three songs: "Eat Your Young", "All Things End" and "Through Me (The Flood)".

Unreal Unearth was released on 18 August 2023. Hozier's relationship with the Irish language is evident in the album in song lyrics ("Uiscefhuaraithe") and song themes. He also sings in Irish on some of "De Selby (Part 1)", with translation support from Darach Ó Séaghdha, Peter Kavanagh and Dr Gearóidín McEvoy from the Irish podcast "Motherfoclóir".

On 22 March 2024, Hozier released the EP Unheard, which features four songs: "Too Sweet", "Wildflower and Barley" featuring Allison Russell, "Empire Now", and "Fare Well". The songs were originally meant to be included on Unreal Unearth and were also inspired by Dante's Inferno. Hozier said that "these are songs that might have made it to the circles of gluttony, limbo, violence, and the outward 'ascent' respectively". Of these songs, "Too Sweet" was the most commercially successful; it debuted at number five on the US Billboard Hot 100, becoming his first song to debut within the top five of the chart and his second top five entry since "Take Me To Church". "Too Sweet" rose to number one three weeks later, making Hozier the fourth Irish artist to top the chart.

On 1 August 2024, while performing at Lollapalooza 2024, he presented an unreleased song titled "Nobody's Soldier" and called for a ceasefire in the Gaza war. After this, he released the EP Unaired, which featured songs "Nobody's Soldier", "July", and "That You Are" featuring Bedouine. A deluxe version of Unreal Unearth titled Unreal Unearth: Unending featuring a brand new song, "Hymn to Virgil", was later released.

On 28 February 2026, Hozier performed with Mumford & Sons on Saturday Night Live.

== Artistry ==
=== Influences ===
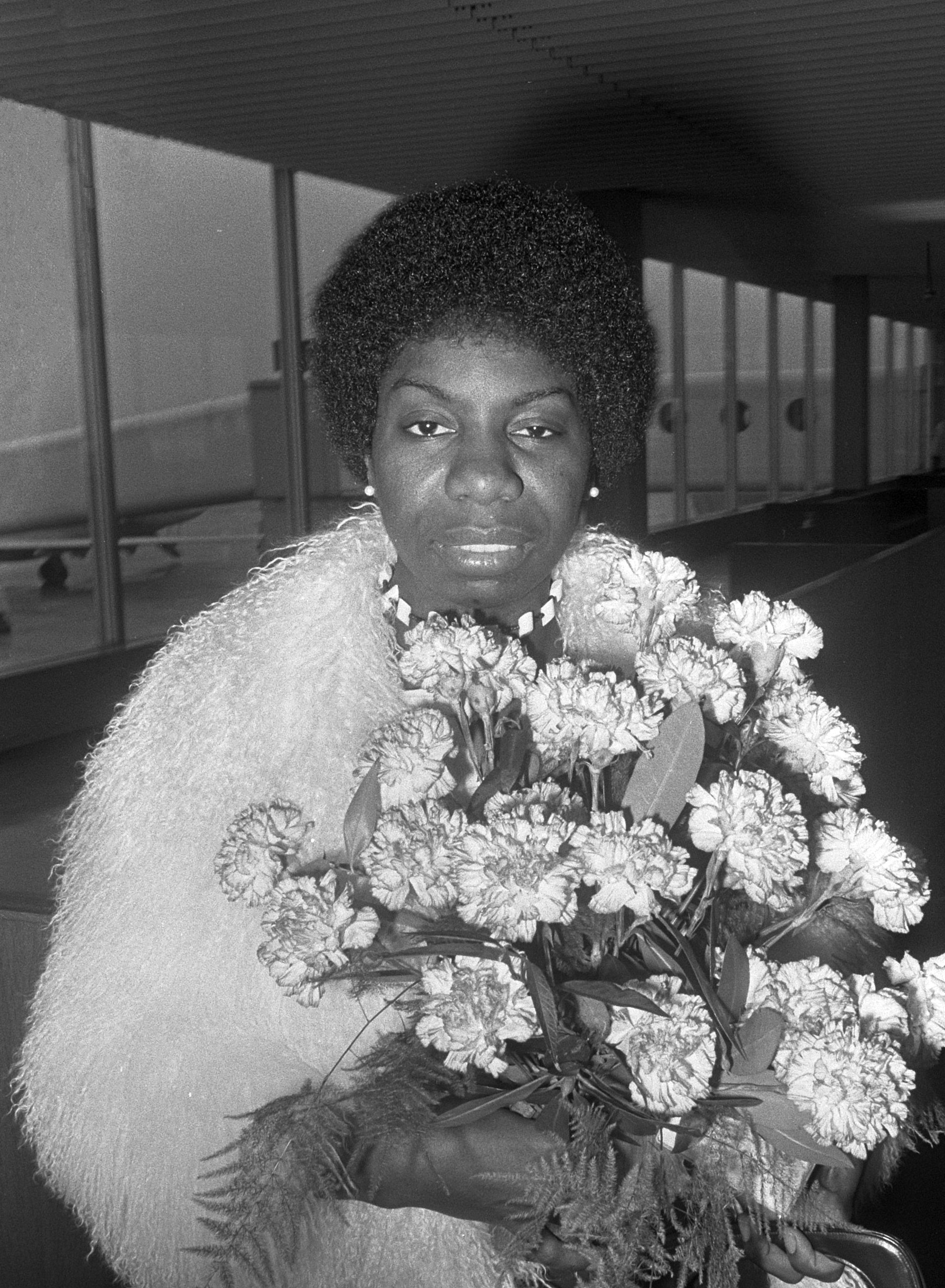
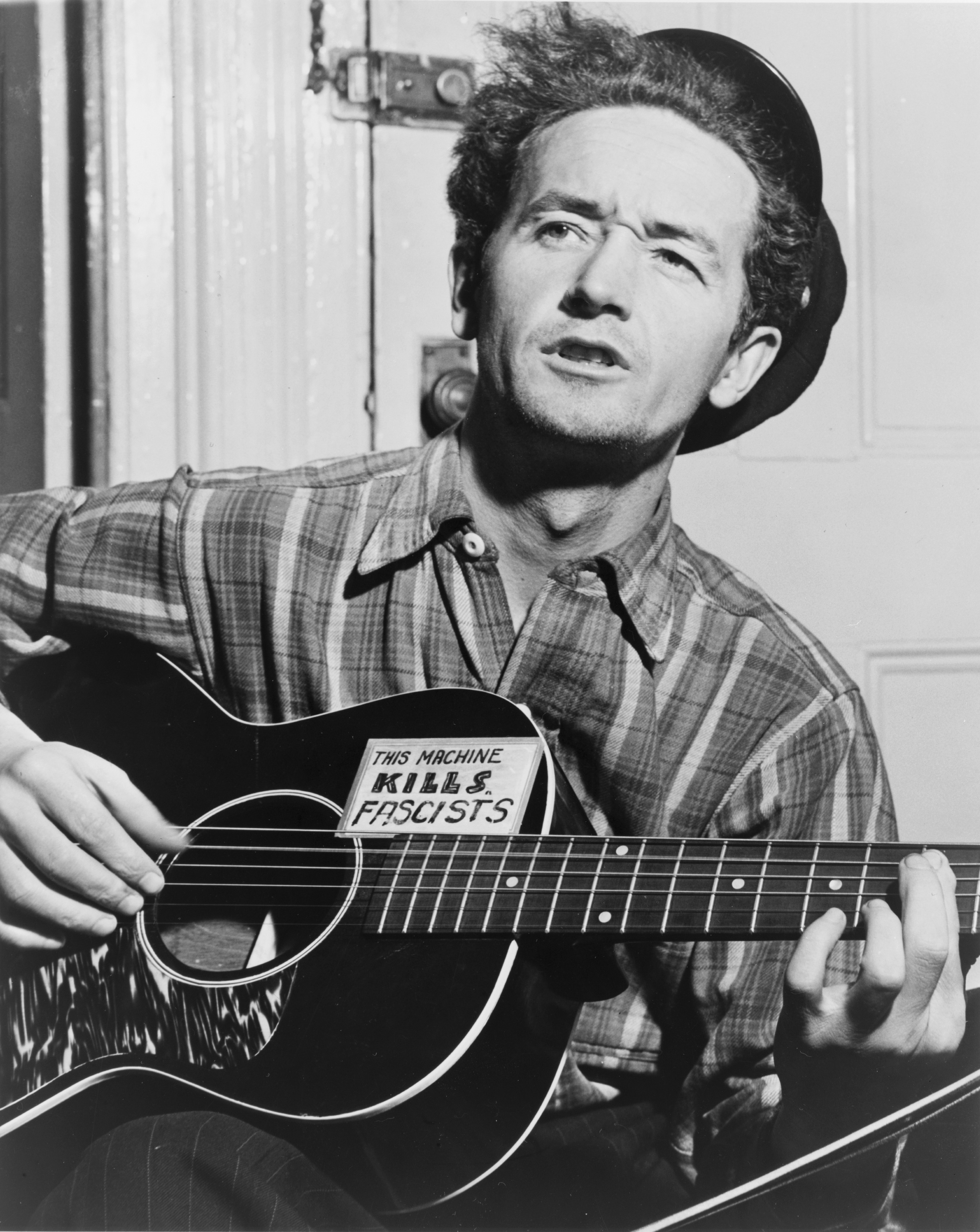
Hozier has credited artist-activists Nina Simone and Woody Guthrie among the influences of his music.

As a result of his countryside upbringing, much of Hozier's early music exposure came from his parents' blues, jazz and soul record collections, incorporating artists such as John Lee Hooker, Muddy Waters, Bukka White and Tom Waits. His first musical memories were drawn from his father's career as a drummer playing music in Dublin. He has stated that his musical education was "grounded" in Chicago blues artists such as John Lee Hooker, Otis Redding and Nina Simone, to whom he pays tribute in the track "Nina Cried Power". As a child, he was a fan of the bands Stereophonics and Daft Punk.

He draws inspiration primarily from Irish and African-American artistry; he has said that the "roots" of jazz, rock, soul and R&B have been largely shaped by black culture and finds importance in "crediting the legacy you're crediting". His guitar work draws from Celtic folk inspiration, as well as musicians Ali Farka Toure and Tinariwen. Hozier has stated that "the best vocalists I can think of are female". Musically, Hozier has listed Aretha Franklin, Johnny Cash, Woody Guthrie, Van Morrison, Ella Fitzgerald, St Vincent, Feist, Little Green Cars, Paul Simon, Willie Dixon and Lisa Hannigan as musical and vocal influences.

=== Songwriting ===
Hozier states that his writing differs based on the starting point: varying from a couplet and lyrical idea, or a musical hook that he "flesh[es] out from a fairly embryonic point". Lyrics "by far take [him] the most time", describing a "slow process of repetition" while "not lean[ing] too much on verbose phrases" to maintain the integrity of the sentiment. His process is described as "slow, methodical work" and he is "meticulous" about wording; he has stated that he "can defend any idea by the time someone hears it, because [he has] put it through a strainer seven times". His lyrics often contain vivid literary references and draw imagery from nature and religion; they tend to focus on themes of romantic relationships, love and politics.

Hozier has dismissed comparisons of his work to poetry, stating that to consider it such "would be a disservice to poetry itself". The "subversion of social norms" plays a role in his music, which often discuss the defiance of organised religion and social convention. Hozier references the Irish concept of the craic, which he interprets as subverting social norms and self-respect, and has stated, "If the Irish are not taking the piss out of something, what's the point really?" His songwriting has been influenced by Irish music and folklore, as well as poets Seamus Heaney and W. B. Yeats. He has said that his first record contained a "fairytale aspect" influenced by Oscar Wilde.

=== Socially conscious themes ===
Steve Baltin of Forbes observed that Hozier's brief collegiate study of music theory has influenced his sound as he writes from a "socially conscious" perspective. Hozier has stated that he believes "the personal is the political"; much of his work holds direct references to topical events. The "Take Me to Church" music video features two men in a same-sex relationship and highlights the injustices and violence perpetrated against members of the LGBT community. The video was inspired by videos of violent crimes against gay men in Russia. The music video for the song "Cherry Wine" was released to raise awareness of domestic violence. "Nina Cried Power" is a song that features lyrics including names of artists such as Nina Simone, Bob Dylan and Mavis Staples whose work takes a political or social justice stance. The music video features Irish activists alongside protest footage.

In November 2019, Hozier released a song titled "Jackboot Jump", following live performances of it on tour. This song, besides being a direct reference to George Orwell's 1984, alludes to social demonstrations in Hong Kong, Russia, and America. In 2019, Hozier performed an unreleased song, "But the Wages", that refers to temperatures rising as well as riots all around the world, while wages remain the same. Prior to the release of Unreal Unearth, Hozier released the single Swan Upon Leda. Named after the Leda and the Swan Greek myth, Hozier stated on social media that the song was inspired by the work of Mona Eltahawy and the systemic oppression of women. Commentators noted the thematic resonance with the release coinciding with the Dobbs v. Jackson Women's Health Organization decision in the U.S. and the Iranian protests following the death of Mahsa Amini. Though the song was written and produced before either of these occurred, Hozier commented that the timing of the release was intentional, calling it "an opportunity to offer some show of solidarity."

== Personal life ==
Hozier was raised a Quaker and now identifies as agnostic.

=== Activism and views ===
In 2016, Hozier participated in the "Home Sweet Home" movement with the goal of getting the Irish government to act to end homelessness. Hozier, who was brought up in the Quaker faith but also attended a Catholic school, is an outspoken critic of the Catholic Church, specifically on its views on sexual orientation. He showed support for abortion in the Republic of Ireland in the 2018 referendum and stated he felt "pride" in his generation and the democratic process following the vote. In 2020, Hozier donated all the royalties from his 2019 protest song "Jackboot Jump" to the NAACP and Black Lives Matter movement following the George Floyd protests. In March 2023, Hozier performed at the Love Rising benefit concert in Nashville in support of the LGBTQ community. Hozier has expressed solidarity with Palestinians by calling for a ceasefire in Gaza during his Unreal Unearth shows.

== Discography ==
- Hozier (2014)
- Wasteland, Baby! (2019)
- Unreal Unearth (2023)

== Awards and nominations ==
American Music Awards

Year	Nominee / work	Award	Result	Ref.
2015	Hozier	Favorite Alternative Artist	Nominated	
2025	Hozier	Favorite Male Pop Artist	Nominated	
2025	Hozier	Favorite Rock Artist	Nominated	
2025	"Too Sweet"	Song of the Year	Nominated	
2025	"Too Sweet"	Favorite Rock Song	Nominated	
2025	Unreal Unearth	Favorite Rock Album	Nominated	

ARIA Music Awards

Year	Nominee / work	Award	Result
2015	Hozier	Best International Artist	Nominated

BBC Music Awards

Year	Nominee / work	Award	Result
2015	Hozier	International Artist of the Year	Nominated
2015	"Take Me to Church"	Song of the Year	Won

BMI London Awards

Year	Nominee / work	Award	Result	Ref.
2025	"Eat Your Young"	Award-Winning Song	Won	
2025	"Too Sweet"	Award-Winning Song	Won	

Berlin Music Video Awards

Year	Nominee / work	Award	Result
2024	De Selby (Part 2)	Best Cinematography	Won

Billboard Music Awards

Year	Nominee / work	Award	Result
2015	Hozier	Top New Artist	Nominated
2015	Hozier	Top Rock Artist	Won
2015	"Take Me to Church"	Top Streaming Song (Audio)	Nominated
2015	"Take Me to Church"	Top Rock Song	Won
2015	Hozier	Top Rock Album	Nominated
2024	Hozier	Top Rock Artist	Nominated
2024	Unheard	Top Rock Album	Nominated
2024	"Too Sweet"	Top Rock Song	Nominated

Brit Awards

Year	Nominee / work	Award	Result	Ref.
2015	Hozier	International Male Solo Artist	Nominated	
2025	"Too Sweet"	Best International Song	Nominated	

CMT Music Awards

Year	Nominee / work	Award	Result	Ref.
2024	"Take Me to Church" (with Maren Morris)	CMT Performance of the Year	Nominated	

Country Music Association Awards

Year	Nominee / work	Award	Result
2020	"The Bones" (with Maren Morris)	Musical Event of the Year	Nominated

Electronic Dance Music Awards

Year	Nominee / work	Award	Result	Ref.
2022	"Tell It to My Heart" (with Meduza)	Dance Song Of The Year	Nominated	

European Border Breakers Awards

Year	Nominee / work	Award	Result
2015	Hozier	Album of the Year	Won

Grammy Awards

Year	Nominee / work	Award	Result
2015	"Take Me to Church"	Song of the Year	Nominated

Hungarian Music Awards

Year	Nominee / work	Award	Result	Ref.
2016	Hozier	Foreign Alternative or Indie-Rock Album or Recording of the Year	Nominated	

Ivor Novello Awards

Year	Nominee / work	Award	Result
2015	"Take Me to Church"	Best Song Musically and Lyrically	Won
2019	"Nina Cried Power"	Best Song Musically and Lyrically	Nominated

iHeartRadio Music Awards

Year	Nominee / work	Award	Result	Ref.
2016	Hozier	Best New Artist	Nominated	
2020	"The Bones" (with Maren Morris)	Best Remix	Nominated	
2025	"Too Sweet"	Song of the Year	Nominated	
2025	"Too Sweet"	Pop Song of the Year	Nominated	
2025	"Too Sweet"	Alternative Song of the Year	Won	

Juno Awards

Year	Nominee / work	Award	Result
2016	Hozier	International Album of the Year	Nominated

Los Premios 40 Principales

Year	Nominee / work	Award	Result
2015	Hozier	Best International New Artist	Nominated
2015	"Take Me to Church"	Best International Video	Nominated

MTV Europe Music Awards

Year	Nominee / work	Award	Result	Ref.
2014	"Take Me to Church"	Best Song with a Social Message	Nominated	
2024	Hozier	Best Alternative	Nominated	
2024	Hozier	Best UK & Ireland Act	Nominated	

MTV Video Music Awards

Year	Nominee / work	Award	Result	Ref.
2015	"Take Me to Church"	Best Rock Video	Nominated	
2015	"Take Me to Church"	Best Direction	Nominated	
2024	"Too Sweet"	Best Alternative	Nominated	
2024	"Too Sweet"	Song of Summer	Nominated	

Silver Clef Award

Year	Nominee / work	Award	Result	Ref.
2016	Hozier	International Award	Won	

Teen Choice Awards

Year	Nominee / work	Award	Result
2015	"Take Me to Church"	Choice Rock Song	Won

Video Prisma Awards

Year	Nominee / work	Award	Result	Ref.
2023	"Eat Your Young"	Best Direction	Nominated	
2023	"Eat Your Young"	Best Rock Video - International	Won	

Žebřík Music Awards

Year	Nominee / work	Award	Result	Ref.
2014	Hozier	Best International Discovery	Nominated	
2014	"Take Me to Church"	Best International Song	Nominated	

=== Postage stamp ===
On 15 July 2021, the Irish postal service, An Post, released a postage stamp celebrating Hozier.

== Tours ==
=== Headlining ===
- North American fall (2015)
- Wasteland, Baby! (2019) – North America, Australia, New Zealand and Europe.
- Unreal Unearth (2023-2025)

== See also ==
- List of Irish Grammy Award winners and nominees
