= Tell It to My Heart (Meduza song) =

2021 song by Meduza featuring Hozier

Single by Meduza featuring Hozier
- Released: 29 October 2021
- Genre: Deep house
- Length: 2:45
- Label: Island
- Songwriters: Luca De Gregorio; Mattia Vitale; Simone Giani; Andrew Hozier-Byrne; Neil Ormandy; Sam Gray
- Producer: Meduza

Meduza singles chronology
"Headrush" (2021)	"Tell It to My Heart" (2021)	"Bad Memories" (2022)

Hozier singles chronology
"The Parting Glass" (2020)	"Tell It to My Heart" (2021)	"Swan Upon Leda" (2022)

Music video
- "Tell It to My Heart" on YouTube

"Tell It to My Heart" is a song by Italian production trio Meduza featuring Irish singer-songwriter and musician Hozier. It was released on 29 October 2021, via Island Records. The song was written by Neil Ormandy, Hozier, Sam Gray, Luca De Gregorio, Mattia Vitale and Simone Giani.

== Background ==
In a press release on how the collaboration came about, Hozier stated: "Towards the end of a long period of weighing up what we've missed about night life and its spaces, and with it the communal buzz of dance floors and live electronic music, Meduza reached out to me with a song and it felt like the right time to lend my voice to a project outside my comfort zone."

== Content ==
Jack Spilsbury of We Rave You wrote that "Tell It to My Heart" is about "a relationship that is taking a turn for the worst, something that everyone has gone through". The song is written in the key of B minor, with a tempo of 124 beats per minute.

== Critical reception ==
Drew Barkin of EDM Tunes commented that the track "channels Meduza's signature sound" and Hozier's vocals "take the track to new heights".

== Music video ==
An accompanying music video was released on 4 December 2021, and directed by Mónica G. Carter. It was starred Ian Gael Castro Hernandez, Sonia Lizet Hernandez and Yael Alexander Castro Hernandez. The video tells a story about the two brothers "who are fighting to keep their bond together".

== Personnel ==
Credits adapted from Tidal.

- Luca De Gregorio – producer, composer, lyricist, associated performer, drum programing, mastering engineer, mixer, percussion, sound effects, studio personnel, synthesizer, vocal engineer, vocals
- Mattia Vitale – producer, composer, lyricist, associated performer, drum programing, mastering engineer, mixer, percussion, sound effects, studio personnel, synthesizer, vocal engineer, vocals
- Simone Giani – producer, composer, lyricist, associated performer, drum programing, mastering engineer, mixer, percussion, sound effects, studio personnel, synthesizer, vocal engineer, vocals
- Hozier – composer, lyricist, associated performer, vocals
- Neil Ormandy – composer, lyricist
- Sam Gray – composer, lyricist

== Charts ==
=== Weekly charts ===
Weekly chart performance for "Tell It to My Heart"
Chart (2021–2023)	Peak position
CIS Airplay (TopHit)	98
Czech Republic Airplay (ČNS IFPI)	16
Germany (GfK)	70
Global 200 (Billboard)	186
Hungary (Rádiós Top 40)	40
Hungary (Single Top 40)	17
Ireland (IRMA)	13
Italy (FIMI)	70
Lithuania (AGATA)	74
Netherlands (Dutch Top 40)	26
Netherlands (Single Top 100)	55
New Zealand Hot Singles (RMNZ)	15
Poland (Polish Airplay Top 100)	26
Russia Airplay (TopHit)	175
San Marino (SMRRTV Top 50)	20
Slovakia Airplay (ČNS IFPI)	37
Sweden (Sverigetopplistan)	97
Switzerland (Schweizer Hitparade)	65
UK Singles (OCC)	46
UK Dance (OCC)	14
US Hot Dance/Electronic Songs (Billboard)	10

=== Year-end charts ===
2022 year-end chart performance for "Tell It to My Heart"
Chart (2022)	Position
US Hot Dance/Electronic Songs (Billboard)	27

== Certifications ==
Certifications for "Tell It to My Heart"
Region	Certification	Certified units/sales
Brazil (Pro-Música Brasil)	Diamond	160,000^{‡}
Canada (Music Canada)	Platinum	80,000^{‡}
Italy (FIMI)	Platinum	100,000^{‡}
New Zealand (RMNZ)	Gold	15,000^{‡}
Poland (ZPAV)	Gold	25,000^{‡}
Portugal (AFP)	Gold	5,000^{‡}
United Kingdom (BPI)	Silver	200,000^{‡}
United States (RIAA)	Gold	500,000^{‡}
^{‡} Sales+streaming figures based on certification alone.

== Release history ==
Release history for "Tell It to My Heart"
Region	Date	Format	Label	Ref.
Various	29 October 2021	Digital download; streaming	Island	
Italy	29 October 2021	Contemporary hit radio	Universal	

== See also ==
- List of Billboard number-one dance songs of 2022
