= Garnett sisters =

Irish singer-songwriting sisters

Loah
- Born: Sallay-Matu Garnett
- Occupations: Singer, songwriter
- Website: https://www.loahmusic.com/

Fehdah
- Born: Emma Garnett
- Other name: Feather
- Occupations: Singer, songwriter

Sallay-Matu Garnett (stage name Loah) and Emma Garnett (stage name Feather/Fehdah) are Irish singer-songwriters of Sierra Leonean descent. They perform individually, but have contributed to each other's work. They have written in English, Sherbro and Krio. Sallay, a qualified pharmacist, contributed to Hozier's debut album, and in 2019 played Mary Magdalene in Jesus Christ Superstar in the Barbican Theatre, London.

In 2020, Loah was part of an Irish collective of female singers and musicians called Irish Women in Harmony, that recorded a version of Dreams in aid of the charity SafeIreland, which deals with domestic abuse which had reportedly risen significantly during the COVID-19 lockdown. At the end of 2020, Loah appeared as a guest on RTÉ's music programme Soundtrack to My Life with Kodaline and the RTÉ Concert Orchestra (plus Jack L and presenter Nicky Byrne).

Loah also starred in the 2022 film adaptation of Sally Rooney's novel Conversations with Friends as a character called Evelyn, who is also a singer. Loah performed alongside Jemima Kirke, Joe Alwyn, and Sasha Lane.
