= Cherry Wine (Hozier song) =

Single by Hozier

from the album Hozier
- Released: 14 February 2016
- Recorded: 2013
- Venue: Greystones, Ireland
- Genre: Folk; indie folk
- Length: 4:14
- Label: Rubyworks; Island; Columbia
- Songwriter: Andrew Hozier-Byrne
- Producer: Andrew Hozier-Byrne

Hozier singles chronology
"Jackie & Wilson" (2015)	"Cherry Wine" (2016)	"Better Love" (2016)

Music video
- "Cherry Wine" on YouTube

"Cherry Wine" is a song recorded by Irish singer-songwriter Hozier for his eponymous debut studio album, Hozier (2014). The song was released on 12 February 2016 as the seventh and final single from the album, with proceeds from downloads benefitting anti-domestic violence charities. It is a folk and indie folk song written by Hozier, whose lyrics describe the trappings of an abusive relationship while simultaneously retaining fondness for his partner. The song received acclaim from music critics, who praised its lyrics and sound. Commercially, the song peaked at number 32 on the US Hot Rock & Alternative Songs chart. The accompanying music video premiered on Valentine's Day, and was directed by Dearbhla Walsh and stars Saoirse Ronan as a domestic violence victim.

== Background and composition ==
"Cherry Wine"
"Cherry Wine" was recorded live with vocals, acoustic guitars, and birds chirping in the background.

Hozier initially was shooting his first press photos at an abandoned hotel in Ireland that had caught on fire; the building had a caved-in roof and walls covered in graffiti. "Cherry Wine" was recorded on the roof of the location at 5 a.m. The song is written from the perspective of a man in an abusive relationship, while his love endures through abusive episodes and a culture that enables them. Hozier stated that it is "a love song about the awful parts of love" that "get(s) across the difficulty of [...] facing up to domestic violence"."

Musically, "Cherry Wine" is a folk and indie folk song. The song is the final track of Hozier, written solely by Hozier, and concludes the album on an intimate, apologetic note, with the singer "finally earning yearned-for redemption". It consists solely of "resonant" acoustic guitars against Hozier's vocals during a live recording. Plucked strings are intertwined with the chirping of birds as a red herring opposite lyrics describing a tempestuous, hot-headed, fluctuating love.

== Release and reception ==
"Cherry Wine" was released as a single on 12 February 2016 by Island Records. The song was met with acclaim from music critics for its lyricism and production. Annie Zaleski of The A.V. Club cited the song as "compelling", providing a prime example of "creative friction" on the album. Steven Dunne of State depicted the track as "an aural warm blanket, folksy and rich in tone", comparing the composition to a Dave Van Ronk song. The voice-work was described by Carly Snider from The Michigan Daily as "haunting" and "delicate yet powerful". Kelsey McKinney from Vox stated that the song is "a love sonnet steeped in abuse" and that Hozier's voice "sounds sadder, more distraught, and more exhausted than [it] does in the rest of the album"."

The song peaked at number 32 on the US Billboard Hot Rock and Alternative Songs, spending 20 weeks on the chart. Island Records confirmed that they donated the proceeds from the downloads to international charity organisations benefitting victims of domestic abuse.

== Music video and promotion ==
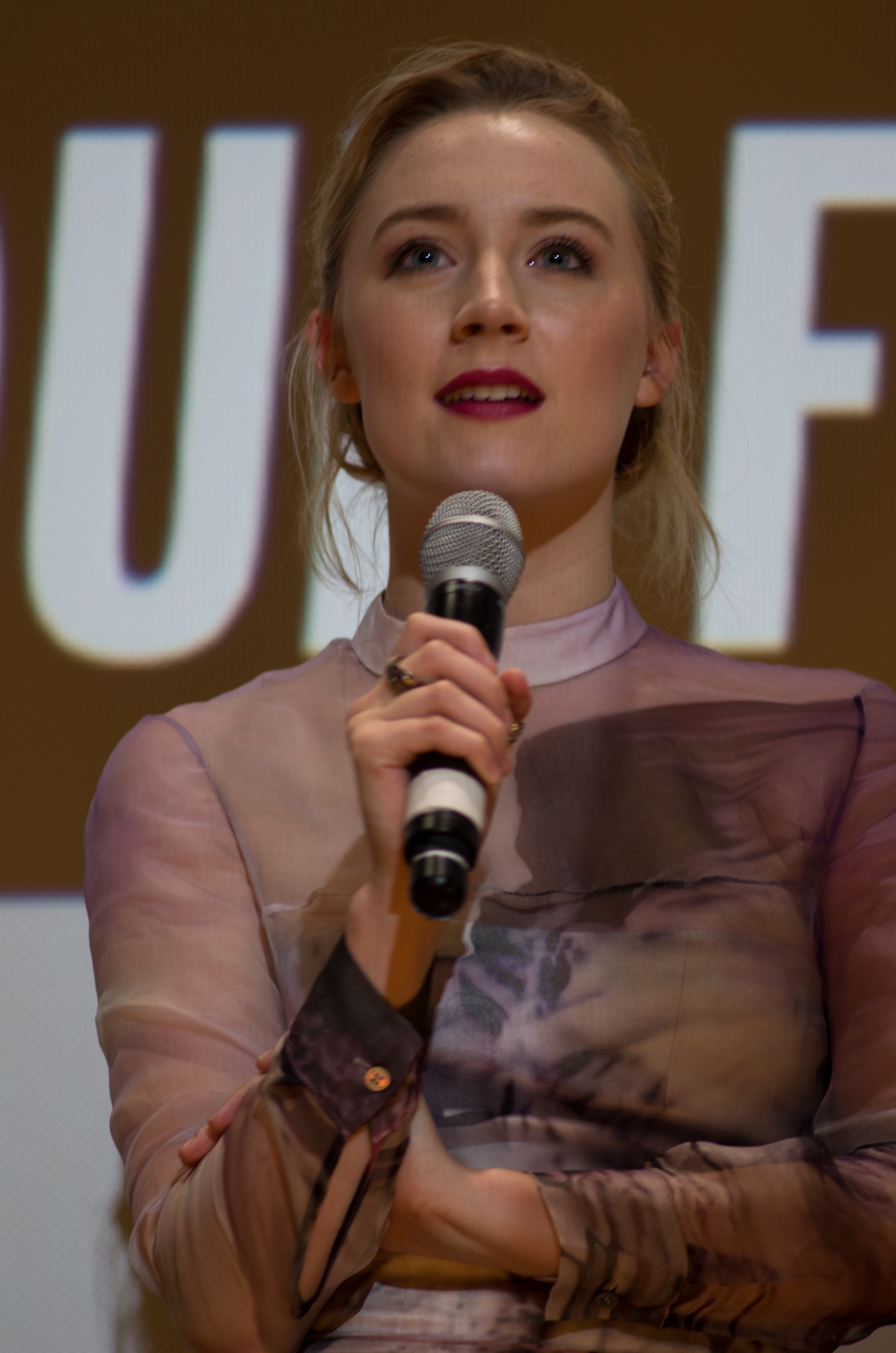
Saoirse Ronan's performance as a victim of domestic violence in the music video was praised by critics

Domestic violence is an ongoing issue in our society, the statistics of which are shocking and the effects of which damage whole families, communities and span generations. With the song Cherry Wine, I tried to get across the difficulty of coming to terms with and facing up to domestic violence and the dynamic of an abusive relationship. I’m honoured to be [...] spreading awareness on this issue.”

— Hozier, NME

The official music video for "Cherry Wine" was released on 14 February 2016, coinciding with Valentine's Day, as part of the #FaceUpToDomesticViolence social media campaign. Directed by Dearbhla Walsh, the video casts actors Saoirse Ronan and Moe Dunford as the victim and her partner. The video features low-key lighting and exposed wood floors in an apartment, with a heart motif appearing throughout in the character's decoration and jewelry. The abuser "sports a tidy beard" and is "wrapped in" a cardigan, with his behaviour appearing caring as he caresses the cheek beneath his partner's injury. Ronan's character is implied to be a mother, who accepts her partner's apparent affection while, in isolation, she tearfully and stoically observes her wounds. The scenes alternate between Ronan and Dunford kissing, laughing and drinking wine intercut with Ronan slowly removing her make-up to reveal a black eye and a forearm bruise.

The music video was described as "powerful", with Ronan's performance praised as "delicate" by Dylan Kickham from Entertainment Weekly. Eileen G'Sell of Salon noted the video's defiance of the "cliched abuser" trope by presenting the abuser's behavior as "unremittingly tender —horrifyingly so." In March 2015, "Cherry Wine" was including on the tracklist during Hozier's NPR Music Tiny Desk Concert. In March 2016, Hozier performed the song live at a HeForShe event by UN Women, supported by SAFE Ireland. The following month, he performed "Cherry Wine" on The Late Late Show with James Corden.

== Personnel ==
- Andrew Hozier-Byrne – vocals, acoustic guitar, production, mixing

== Charts ==
Weekly chart performance for "Cherry Wine"
Chart (2015)	Peak position
US Hot Rock & Alternative Songs (Billboard)	32

Year-end chart performance for "Cherry Wine"
Chart (2015)	Position
US Hot Rock & Alternative Songs (Billboard)	94

== Certifications ==
Certifications and sales for "Cherry Wine"
Region	Certification	Certified units/sales
Brazil (Pro-Música Brasil)	Gold	30,000^{‡}
Canada (Music Canada)	Platinum	80,000^{‡}
Denmark (IFPI Danmark)	Gold	45,000^{‡}
New Zealand (RMNZ)	2× Platinum	60,000^{‡}
United Kingdom (BPI)	Platinum	600,000^{‡}
United States (RIAA)	Platinum	1,000,000^{‡}
^{‡} Sales+streaming figures based on certification alone.
