= Take Me to Church =

2013 single by Hozier

Single by Hozier

from the album Hozier
- B-side: "Run"
- Released: 13 September 2013
- Recorded: 2013
- Studio: The Attic (Wicklow, Ireland)
- Genre: Alternative rock; blues rock; blue-eyed soul; gospel-pop
- Length: 4:01
- Label: Rubyworks
- Songwriter: Andrew Hozier-Byrne
- Producers: Rob Kirwan; Andrew Hozier-Byrne

Hozier singles chronology
"Take Me to Church" (2013)	"From Eden" (2014)

Music video
- "Take Me to Church" on YouTube

"Take Me to Church" is a song by Irish singer-songwriter Hozier. It was released as his debut single on 13 September 2013, originally featuring on his extended play of the same name, before being featured as the opening track of his 2014 self-titled debut album. A struggling musician at the time of its composition, Hozier wrote and recorded the song in the attic of his parents' home in County Wicklow. A mid-tempo soul song, its lyrics use religious terminology to describe a romantic relationship in the face of Church discrimination. The song caught the attention of Rubyworks Records, where producer Rob Kirwan collaborated with Hozier on the final recording.

The accompanying music video premiered in September 2013, directed by Brendan Canty, Emmet O'Brien and Conal Thomson. It was shot in black-and-white and follows a romantic relationship between two men and a violent homophobic attack that followed. Upon its YouTube release in September 2013, the video quickly went viral, leading to Hozier's subsequent license with Columbia Records in the US and Island Records in the UK. In 2014, the song achieved widespread global popularity, topping the charts in 12 countries and reaching the top 10 in 21 other territories. The song also received critical acclaim.

Aided by music platforms Shazam and Spotify to become a rock radio hit in the United States, the song spent 23 consecutive weeks at the top of the Hot Rock Songs chart, tied with Imagine Dragons "Radioactive" as the longest-running number-one in its chart-history (at the time). "Take Me to Church" later crossed over to the Billboard Hot 100, where it peaked at number two in December 2014. The song was nominated for the Grammy Award for Song of the Year at the 57th Annual Grammy Awards and has been certified Diamond in the US, Australia, Canada, and France.

== Background and composition ==
"Take Me to Church"
A 25-second sample of "Take Me to Church" by Hozier, where a portion of the chorus is heard.

In 2013, Hozier was a struggling musician, often seen in Dublin-area open mic nights. During this period, he penned "Take Me to Church" at his parents' home in Bray, County Wicklow, Ireland, and recorded a rough demo in their attic with a programmed backing track. He wrote the song after a bad breakup, as he later remarked that "the vocals were recorded in my attic at 2 o'clock in the morning. So it's a real homemade job." It took him three months to write the song; only two musicians feature on the track: Hozier and drummer Fiachra Kinder. The demo caught the attention of independent label Rubyworks, which paired him with producer Rob Kirwan. The song was overdubbed with live instrumentation, but the original demo vocals were kept because Kirwan found them "powerful" enough to remain.

Lyrically, "Take Me to Church" is a metaphor, with the protagonist comparing his lover to religion. The song grew out of Hozier's frustration with the Catholic Church which, as somebody raised in the Protestant Quaker faith, he saw as dominating the social and political outlook of the Irish state. "Growing up, I always saw the hypocrisy of the Catholic Church", Hozier said in an interview with Rolling Stone. "The history speaks for itself and I grew incredibly frustrated and angry. I essentially just put that into my words."

In an interview with The Irish Times, Hozier stated that he "found the experience of falling in love or being in love was a death, a death of everything ... you kind of watch yourself die in a wonderful way, and you experience for the briefest moment–if you see yourself for a moment through their eyes–everything you believed about yourself gone." The song contains sexual undertones; Hozier elaborated that "an act of sex is one of the most human things ..but an organization like the church, say, through its doctrine, would undermine humanity by successfully teaching shame about sexual orientation ... the song is about asserting yourself and reclaiming your humanity through an act of love.

"Take Me to Church" draws inspiration from author Christopher Hitchens and paraphrases the poet Fulke Greville's verse "Created sick, commanded to be sound".

Sheet music for "Take Me to Church" shows the key of E minor, with a slow tempo of 63 beats per minute.

== Music video ==
The music video for "Take Me to Church" was made by Brendan Canty and Conal Thompson of Feel Good Lost, a small-scale Irish production company hired by Rubyworks, and was released on 25 September 2013. The video was filmed primarily in the city of Cork. According to Canty, the video was made on a budget of €1,500 (equivalent to €1859 in 2023). The story for the video came from Hozier himself, who wanted to bring attention to the repression and persecution faced by the gay community in Russia.

The video features two men (played by Emmet O'Riabhaigh and Daniel Coughlan) in an intimate romantic homosexual relationship. Later on, one of the men is kidnapped from his house, dragged into a forest, and violently kicked by a lynch mob.

Apart from the official videoclip, another one directed by David LaChapelle went viral in 2015 featuring Sergei Polunin dancing to Jade Hale-Christofi's choreography. It was commissioned for a documentary film titled Dancer, directed by Steven Cantor yet leaked online by LaChapelle before its premiere at Sundance Selects. It was created as a farewell to dance but its online success was an important factor in his decision to keep dancing, since he found a new audience and a newly found artistic freedom. Hozier collaborated with Polunin in the video for "Movement" in 2018 as a nod to his work on "Take Me to Church". Polunin posted a series of homophobic, sexist and fatphobic comments about his fellow dancers on Instagram in 2019. Hozier distanced himself and expressed his disappointment with Polunin's ideas, which were in contrast with the "Take Me to Church" official video and song that gave him a second chance.

== Commercial performance ==
I never wrote music for the mainstream. I think I was incredibly fortunate that the song crossed over and people connected with it. Spotify played a big role. It's a discovery platform and it's been invaluable to me over the past year.

— Hozier in 2015

The song rose in prominence alongside its viral music video, attracting A&R representatives from major labels in a bidding war to sign Hozier. He was signed by Justin Eshak of Columbia Records, who later opined that the song became a hit due to a shift on pop radio, spearheaded by Sam Smith: "The music is connecting because when it gets on the air it's such a sharp juxtaposition to the existing material on top 40 radio." The song first experienced chart success in his native Ireland, climbing the charts in October 2013 and eventually reached number two on Irish Singles Chart.

In May 2014, Hozier performed the song on the Late Show with David Letterman. It was sent to US modern rock radio on 24 June 2014 by Columbia Records. It eventually reached number two on the Billboard Hot 100 for three consecutive weeks in December 2014 and January 2015, while becoming his first top 10 single there. As of July 2015, the song has sold 4,270,000 copies in the US. The track has since reached top five in many other countries including peaking at number two in Australia, Canada, New Zealand, and the United Kingdom. It topped the charts in numerous countries, including Austria, Belgium, Iceland, Italy, Sweden and Switzerland.

The song initially attracted US attention in Nashville via an adult album alternative radio station. From there, it became the top song for the area on music identification application Shazam, which led to its appearance on a local top 40 station. "Take Me to Church" achieved widespread popularity in the United States between the summer and fall of 2014.

Despite the song's popularity on YouTube, the song achieved more listens on Spotify, becoming the service's most-streamed song of 2014, achieving 87 million listens.

== Track listing ==
Digital download – single
No.	Title	Length
1.	"Take Me to Church"	4:01

Digital download – EP
No.	Title	Length
1.	"Take Me to Church"	4:01
2.	"Like Real People Do"	3:17
3.	"Angel of Small Death & the Codeine Scene"	3:38
4.	"Cherry Wine" (Live)	3:59

German CD single
No.	Title	Length
1.	"Take Me to Church"	4:01
2.	"Run"	3:17

== Personnel ==
Personnel taken from Hozier liner notes and Sound on Sound.

- Andrew Hozier-Byrne – vocals, guitar, piano, organ, producer
- Fiachra Kinder – drums, percussion
- Rob Kirwan – producer, engineer, mixing
- Stephen Marcussen – mastering

== Charts ==
=== Weekly charts ===
2014–2016 weekly chart performance for "Take Me to Church"
Chart (2014–2016)	Peak position
Australia (ARIA)	2
Austria (Ö3 Austria Top 40)	1
Belgium (Ultratop 50 Flanders)	1
Belgium (Ultratop 50 Wallonia)	2
Canada Hot 100 (Billboard)	2
Canada AC (Billboard)	4
Canada CHR/Top 40 (Billboard)	2
Canada Hot AC (Billboard)	1
Canada Rock (Billboard)	13
Colombia Rock Airplay (National-Report)	1
Czech Republic Airplay (ČNS IFPI)	1
Czech Republic Singles Digital (ČNS IFPI)	1
Denmark (Tracklisten)	4
Dominican Republic Airplay (Monitor Latino)	2
Euro Digital Song Sales (Billboard)	2
Finland (Suomen virallinen lista)	4
France (SNEP)	2
Germany (GfK)	2
Greece Digital Songs (Billboard)	1
Hungary (Rádiós Top 40)	37
Hungary (Single Top 40)	1
Hungary (Stream Top 40)	1
Iceland (Tonlist Lagalistinn)	1
India (Angrezi Top 20)	3
Ireland (IRMA)	2
Israel International Airplay (Media Forest)	10
Italy (FIMI)	1
Lebanon (Lebanese Top 20)	1
Luxembourg Digital Song Sales (Billboard)	1
Mexico Anglo Airplay (Monitor Latino)	18
Netherlands (Dutch Top 40)	2
Netherlands (Single Top 100)	2
New Zealand (Recorded Music NZ)	2
Norway (VG-lista)	2
Poland Airplay (ZPAV)	1
Romania (Airplay 100)	61
Scottish Singles Sales (Official Charts)	3
Slovakia Airplay (ČNS IFPI)	5
Slovakia Singles Digital (ČNS IFPI)	1
Slovenia Airplay (SloTop50)	6
South Korea International (Gaon)	6
Spain (Promusicae)	8
Sweden (Sverigetopplistan)	1
Switzerland (Schweizer Hitparade)	1
UK Singles (Official Charts)	2
US Billboard Hot 100	2
US Adult Contemporary (Billboard)	12
US Adult Pop Airplay (Billboard)	1
US Dance Club Songs (Billboard)	32
US Hot Rock & Alternative Songs (Billboard)	1
US Pop Airplay (Billboard)	2
US Rock & Alternative Airplay (Billboard)	3

2022–2026 weekly chart performance for "Take Me to Church"
Chart (2022–2026)	Peak position
Colombia Anglo Airplay (National-Report)	7
Global 200 (Billboard)	110
Greece International (IFPI)	91

=== Year-end charts ===
2014 year-end chart performance for "Take Me to Church"
Chart (2014)	Position
Belgium (Ultratop Flanders)	5
Belgium (Ultratop Wallonia)	60
Canada (Canadian Hot 100)	83
Germany (Official German Charts)	61
Ireland (IRMA)	3
Italy (FIMI)	37
Netherlands (Dutch Top 40)	84
Netherlands (Single Top 100)	42
Sweden (Sverigetopplistan)	76
UK Singles (OCC)	66
US Hot Rock Songs (Billboard)	13
US Rock Airplay (Billboard)	15

2015 year-end chart performance for "Take Me to Church"
Chart (2015)	Position
Australia (ARIA)	4
Austria (Ö3 Austria Top 40)	15
Belgium (Ultratop 50 Flanders)	37
Belgium (Ultratop 50 Wallonia)	8
Canada (Canadian Hot 100)	7
CIS (TopHit)	6
Germany (Official German Charts)	30
Hungary (Single Top 40)	11
Israel (Media Forest)	25
Italy (FIMI)	7
Netherlands (Dutch Top 40)	22
Netherlands (Single Top 100)	13
New Zealand (Recorded Music NZ)	4
Poland (ZPAV)	20
Russia Airplay (TopHit)	7
Slovenia (SloTop50)	8
Spain (PROMUSICAE)	32
Sweden (Sverigetopplistan)	12
Switzerland (Schweizer Hitparade)	7
Ukraine Airplay (TopHit)	7
UK Singles (Official Charts Company)	3
US Billboard Hot 100	14
US Adult Contemporary (Billboard)	26
US Adult Top 40 (Billboard)	13
US Mainstream Top 40 (Billboard)	19
US Hot Rock Songs (Billboard)	2
US Rock Airplay (Billboard)	19

2016 year-end chart performance for "Take Me to Church"
Chart (2016)	Position
France (SNEP)	156

2021 year-end chart performance for "Take Me to Church"
Chart (2021)	Position
Global 200 (Billboard)	119

2022 year-end chart performance for "Take Me to Church"
Chart (2022)	Position
Global 200 (Billboard)	113
Ukraine Airplay (TopHit)	151

2023 year-end chart performance for "Take Me to Church"
Chart (2023)	Position
Australia (ARIA)	85
Global 200 (Billboard)	104
UK Singles (OCC)	68

2024 year-end chart performance for "Take Me to Church"
Chart (2024)	Position
Australia (ARIA)	57
Global 200 (Billboard)	85
UK Singles (OCC)	65

2025 year-end chart performance for "Take Me to Church"
Chart (2025)	Position
Australia (ARIA)	94
Belgium (Ultratop 50 Flanders)	172
Global 200 (Billboard)	94
UK Singles (OCC)	83

=== Decade-end charts ===
Decade-end chart performance for "Take Me to Church"
Chart (2010–2019)	Position
Australia (ARIA)	31
Norway (VG-lista)	15
UK Singles (Official Charts Company)	17
US Billboard Hot 100	91
US Hot Rock Songs (Billboard)	12

== Certifications ==
Certifications for "Take Me to Church"
Region	Certification	Certified units/sales
Australia (ARIA)	18× Platinum	1,260,000^{‡}
Austria (IFPI Austria)	Platinum	30,000^{*}
Belgium (BRMA)	3× Platinum	60,000^{‡}
Brazil (Pro-Música Brasil)	2× Diamond	500,000^{‡}
Canada (Music Canada)	Diamond	800,000^{‡}
Denmark (IFPI Danmark)	5× Platinum	450,000^{‡}
France (SNEP)	Diamond	233,333^{‡}
Germany (BVMI)	7× Gold	1,050,000^{‡}
Italy (FIMI)	7× Platinum	350,000^{‡}
Mexico (AMPROFON)	Gold	30,000^{*}
Netherlands (NVPI)	3× Platinum	90,000^{‡}
New Zealand (RMNZ)	11× Platinum	330,000^{‡}
Norway (IFPI Norway)	7× Platinum	70,000^{‡}
Portugal (AFP)	2× Platinum	40,000^{‡}
South Korea (Gaon Chart)	—	269,845
Spain (Promusicae)	4× Platinum	240,000^{‡}
Sweden (GLF)	9× Platinum	360,000^{‡}
Switzerland (IFPI Switzerland)	Platinum	30,000^{‡}
United Kingdom (BPI)	8× Platinum	4,800,000^{‡}
United States (RIAA)	15× Platinum	15,000,000^{‡}
Streaming
Denmark (IFPI Danmark)	Platinum	2,600,000^{†}
Greece (IFPI Greece)	3× Platinum	6,000,000^{†}
^{*} Sales figures based on certification alone.^{‡} Sales+streaming figures based on certification alone.^{†} Streaming-only figures based on certification alone.

== Release history ==
Release history and formats for "Take Me to Church"
Region	Date	Format	Label
Ireland	13 September 2013	Digital download (EP)	Rubyworks
United States	16 September 2013	Digital download (EP)	Rubyworks
United States	24 February 2014	Adult album alternative radio	Columbia
Ireland	20 March 2014	Digital download	Rubyworks
United States	24 June 2014	Modern rock radio	Columbia
United States	8 September 2014	Hot adult contemporary radio	Columbia
United States	16 September 2014	Contemporary hit radio	Columbia
Italy	14 November 2014	Contemporary hit radio	Island

== See also ==
- List of best-selling singles in Australia
