= Rob Kirwan =

Record producer and sound engineer

Robert Kirwan
- Born: 14 January 1970 (age 56); Dún Laoghaire, Dublin, Ireland
- Genres: Alternative rock; indie rock; electronica
- Occupations: Record producer; audio engineer; mixing engineer
- Years active: 1992–present
- Website: robkirwan.com

Rob Kirwan is an Irish record producer, mixing engineer and audio engineer based in Dublin, Ireland. He has worked with such artists as Hozier, PJ Harvey, Local Natives, U2, Depeche Mode, Editors, Glasvegas, The Courteeners, The Horrors, The Pains of Being Pure at Heart, Bell X1, Delorentos, Soulsavers, Soulwax and Sneaker Pimps.

== Early life ==
Born 14 January 1970 in Dún Laoghaire, Dublin, Ireland, Kirwan was educated at St. Columba's College, Dublin.

== Career ==
Kirwan worked as an assistant engineer at Windmill Lane Recording Studios from 1992 to 1995. Within his first year he worked on the U2 album Zooropa and then went on to work with producers such as Flood, Brian Eno, Steve Lillywhite, Stephen Street, Geoff Emrick, Nellee Hooper and Don Was. He also worked with artists such as PJ Harvey, The Cranberries, Simple Minds, Kris Kristofferson, Willie Nelson, Elvis Costello and Sinéad O'Connor. From 1995 to 1998 Rob worked as an engineer for U2 at their own studio. He then moved to London as a freelance engineer, producer and mixer and worked there for ten years before he relocated to Berlin, Germany. After a year he returned to Dublin where he now has his own studio, Exchequer Studios, in the heart of Dublin city centre.

== Awards and nominations ==
Grammy Awards

Year	Album/Song	Artist	Award	Results
2015	"Take Me to Church"	Hozier	Song of the Year	Nominated
2017	The Hope Six Demolition Project	PJ Harvey	Best Alternative Music Album	Nominated

Mercury Prize

Year	Album/Song	Artist	Award	Results
2011	Let England Shake	PJ Harvey	Album of the Year	Winner

Choice Music Prize

Year	Album/Song	Artist	Award	Results
2011	Bloodless Coup	Bell X1	Irish Album of the Year	Nomination
2012	Little Sparks	Delorentos	Irish Album of the Year	Winner
2014	Night Becomes Light	Delorentos	Irish Album of the Year	Nomination
2014	Hozier	Hozier	Irish Album of the Year	Nomination
