= Pennsport (string band) =

Pennsport is a string band in Philadelphia's annual Mummers Parade. They are one of two new groups added to the parade in 2008.

They have taken a new approach to mummering: keeping expenses low, paying out of pocket and avoiding fund-raising and weekly jobs to fund their march.

Most of the members were previously in other string bands. All 60 members are over 40 and because of family and job obligations wanted to be in the Parade without making it a year-round commitment.

They are self-financed, paying dues of $325 each for a total of just under $20,000, roughly one fifth of what a typical string band spends. Lacking the usual clubhouse, they meet in a room over a local pub. Along with their non-traditional funding comes a unique structure: they are the only string band that does not have a captain.

Mummers Parade Director Leo Dignam said, "I kind of like that trend. Some of the people are getting sick of all the money involved and the practice, and they just want to keep the tradition. These old guys just want to have fun."

In 2008, for their first parade, they were led up the street by U.S. Representative Bob Brady and Mayor-elect Michael Nutter. While the other bands played at the six mandatory points along the route, Pennsport chose to also play while they marched, filling in some of the dead areas of a long route.

== See also ==
- Aqua String Band
- Greater Kensington (string band)
- Holy Rollers N.Y.B.
