= Alabama Jubilee (song) =

1924 song by George L. Cobb and Jack Yellen

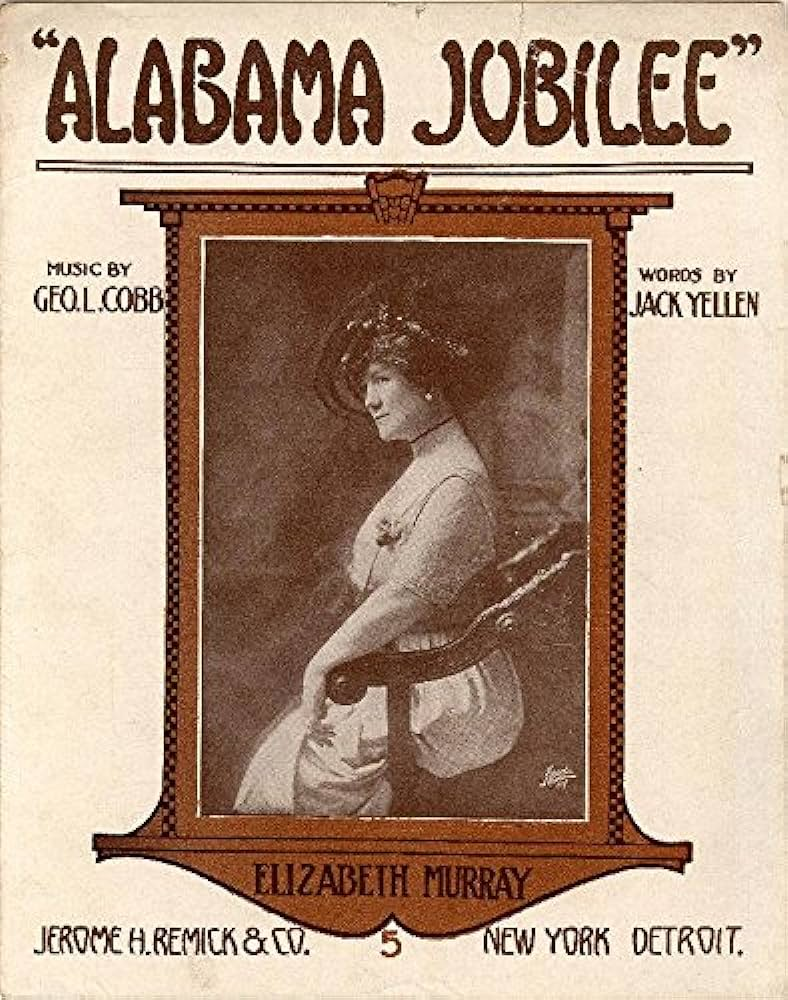
Sheet music cover, 1915

"Alabama Jubilee" is a song written with music by George L. Cobb and words by Jack Yellen. The first known recording was that of comedians Collins & Harlan in 1915. The song is considered an American popular standard. The most popular versions of the song were Red Foley's 1951 version (#3 country, #28 pop) and the 1955 instrumental version by the Ferko String Band, which reached #13 on Cashbox, #14 on the Billboard Jukebox chart, and #20 in the UK. A 1981 instrumental version by Roy Clark won the Grammy Award for Best Country Instrumental Performance.

The song is a popular marching band song. It was remade as a Tejano song "El circo" by Tony De La Rosa.

== Other versions ==
- 1916: Prince Band
- 1926: Skillet Lickers
- 1927: Al Bernard & Ernest Hare
- 1929: Cleve Chaffin
- 1929: The McClung Brothers
- 1950: Muggsy Spanier
- 1951: The Fontane Sisters
- 1951: Johnny Maddox
- 1951: Hank Penny
- 1954: Chet Atkins
- 1955: David Carroll And His Orchestra
- 1955: Firehouse Five Plus Two
- 1956: The Dukes of Dixieland
- 1959: Ferlin Husky
- 1959: Teresa Brewer and the Dixieland Band
- 1962: Billy Vaughn
- 1962: Los Broncos De Reynosa (El Circo)
- 1964: Mance Lipscomb
- 1964: Roy Clark
- 1968: Doc Watson
- 1970: Jerry Reed
- 1971: Kenny Price
- 1976: Benny Martin
- 1976: R. Crumb & His Cheap Suit Serenaders
- 1978: Leon Redbone
- 1980: Jerry Lee Lewis
- 1980: Clarence White (and The Kentucky Colonels) (live performances from 1973)
- 1988: Nokie Edwards
- 1988: David Grier
- 1999: 17 Hippies
- 2002: Buster B. Jones
- 2005: Orquestra Mahatma
- 2007: Molly and Jack Tuttle
- 2008: Eugene Chadbourne
- 2008: Kevin Blechdom
- 2010: Zac Brown Band
- 2010: The Wiggles and Mic Conway
- 2012: Stephen Wade
- 2015: Jim Hendricks
- 2018: Roland White
