= Greater Kensington =

Coordinates: 40.0283°N 75.0339°W

Greater Kensington is a string band in Philadelphia's annual Mummers Parade.

The Greater Kensington String Band was organized in 1946 and first marched in the New Year's Day Mummers Parade in 1948. The band, known as "GKSB", has taken first prize on three occasions and has finished in the top ten forty one times including seventeen years in the top five.

GKSB started in 1946 on Front Street below Lehigh Avenue and moved to a location atop the Cumberland Sho-bar at Kensington Avenue and "A" Street beneath the Market–Frankford Line. In 1960 the band relocated and established its headquarters at 2844 "D" Street.

The band owns its headquarters on Edmund Street in Northeast Philadelphia. The band has joined with the Mayfair Optimist Club and the Mayfair-Holmesburg Merchants Association to sponsor and help organize the Annual Thanksgiving Day Parade on Frankford Avenue since 1974.

While New Year's Day is the band's big event of the year, the group has performed nationally, with past performances in Tennessee, Minnesota, Wisconsin, Illinois, the New England states, New Jersey, Maryland, Delaware and throughout Pennsylvania. They have also performed at the Quebec Winter Carnival, the Carnival de Libertad in Cuba, Oktoberfest in Kitchener-Waterloo, Ontario, the P. T. Barnum Festival in Connecticut and the Nebraska State Fair. They performed at the 1984 inauguration of Mayor Wilson Goode at the Academy of Music and as part of Goode's bid for Philadelphia to host Super Bowl XXI.

The band has also marched in the Miss America Parade, performed on the Merv Griffin Show, Philadelphia's Puerto Rican Day parade, with the USO and in a command performance at Constitution Hall in Washington, D.C., with Charlie Daniels and the Rockettes in 1991. In 2004, the band performed in front of a live crowd of 280,000 people in the Chinese New Year Parade in Hong Kong. They have also performed in the Grand Opera House, appeared on the same bill with the Philadelphia Orchestra, and played across the Brooklyn Bridge when it was re-dedicated.

In 1983, the band was selected to represent the East Coast and was one of only four bands to perform at the National Sports Festival held at the United States Air Force Academy in Colorado Springs.

Also in 1983, the band was a plaintiff in a federal lawsuit aimed at preventing planned changes to the Mummer's Parade.

In September 2007, the Tacony warehouse that they were renting was destroyed by arson. The band lost thousands of dollars' worth of tools, set pieces and an inventory of thousands of ostrich feathers. The total loss was estimated at $20,000, with $6,000 of that being feathers alone. As of December 2007, they are unsure if their insurance will cover the loss.

While bands typically spend most of the year preparing for the parade on New Year's Day, the band was able to rebuild most of their planned sets and props in time for the 2008 parade. The band publicly cited help from supporters and their competitors in the parade, with help coming from every other string band in the city and critically needed feathers from South Philadelphia, Avalon, Woodland and Trilby.

In 1963, Sure Records released the band's album "String Band Sound of All-Time Favorites".

== See also ==
- Aqua String Band
- Holy Rollers N.Y.B.
- Pennsport (string band)
- Two Street
