= Sam McGee =

Sam McGee may refer to:

- "The Cremation of Sam McGee", a poem written by Robert W. Service
- Sam McGee, an American country musician of the McGee Brothers duo
