= Almost (Sweet Music) =

2018 song by Hozier

Single by Hozier

from the album Wasteland, Baby!
- Released: 16 January 2019
- Genre: Folk rock; gospel
- Length: 3:37
- Label: Rubyworks; Island
- Songwriter: Hozier
- Producers: A. Hozier-Byrne; Markus Dravs

Hozier singles chronology
"Movement" (2018)	"Almost (Sweet Music)" (2019)	"Dinner & Diatribes" (2019)

Music video
- "Almost (Sweet Music)" on YouTube

"Almost (Sweet Music)" is a song recorded by Irish singer-songwriter Hozier for his second studio album, Wasteland, Baby! It was released on 16 January 2019 as the third single from the record, peaking at number eight on the Irish Singles Chart.

== Writing and composition ==
"Almost (Sweet Music)"
The track is framed by handclaps and storytelling through song titles and names of jazz artists; the lyric "that was my heart/the drums that start off "Night and Day"" references "Prelude to a Kiss" by Duke Ellington.

"Almost (Sweet Music)" is the second track on the album, written by Hozier alone. "Almost (Sweet Music)" is a folk song with handclaps, "honey-rich" vocals, and gospel choral backing. The lyrics tell a story by paying homage to artists of jazz tradition, including Duke Ellington and John Coltrane, asking "do I owe each kiss to lip and cheek/as soft as Chet can sing"?

The track also "provides a glimpse into his personal journey between the two full-length studio albums" with vocals of both jubilation and exhaustion. On the song, Hozier stated that "since the song references music so much and is about the experience of listening to music, the concept of this video is kind of drawing from the jazz tradition and just a lot of musicians and a lot of dancers whose disciplines stem from that tradition.”

== Critical reception ==
The song received generally positive reviews. The Irish Times stated that "the melody is lifted by a multi-voiced choir bursting straight out of the Pearly Gates" and The Arts Desk states that "the verse is beautifully mumbled and the whole lot just sways", comparing it to a Van Morrison track. PopMatters concluded that the song captured "deep personal sentiment" and illustrated the "fullness and richness of Hozier's timbre" while Rolling Stone dismissed track among "songs that pile on folksy handclaps and [..] gospel choirs in the hopes of landing on a-coffeehouse playlist."

== Commercial performance ==
The song peaked at number six on the Billboard Rock Digital Sales Chart and number eight on the Irish Singles Chart. The song was certified gold in the UK. Billboard described the track as a "love letter to jazz" and a "a bright and cheery homage to the "sweet music" that shaped his growth as a songwriter."

== Music video ==
The official music video for "Almost (Sweet Music)" was released on 16 April 2019. The video was directed by Blythe Thomas and stars dancers Cameron Boyce and Christine Flores. It intertwines footage of Hozier playing guitar in an empty warehouse with performers interpretive dancing to a "rhythm that works in every environment, from a raucous house party to [..] a cellist practicing in a cozy library." The video has garnered over 12 million views on YouTube.

== Personnel ==
Personnel from "Wasteland, Baby!" liner notes.

- A. Hozier-Byrne – vocals, guitar, piano, claps, snaps, shaker
- Alex Ryan – bass, Wurlitzer, claps, snaps
- Rory Doyle – kick drum, claps, snaps
- Booker T. Jones – organ
- Paul Clarvis – tambourine

== Charts ==
=== Weekly charts ===
Chart (2019)	Peak position
Belgium (Ultratip Bubbling Under Flanders)	33
Ireland (IRMA)	8
New Zealand Hot Singles (RMNZ)	18
UK Singles (Official Charts)	82
US Digital Song Sales (Billboard)	45
US Hot Rock & Alternative Songs (Billboard)	9

=== Year-end charts ===
Chart (2019)	Peak position
US Hot Rock & Alternative Songs (Billboard)	30

== Certifications ==
Region	Certification	Certified units/sales
Brazil (Pro-Música Brasil)	Gold	20,000^{‡}
Canada (Music Canada)	2× Platinum	160,000^{‡}
United Kingdom (BPI)	Platinum	600,000^{‡}
United States (RIAA)	2× Platinum	2,000,000^{‡}
^{‡} Sales+streaming figures based on certification alone.
