= McGee Brothers =

American old-time musical duo

The McGee Brothers
- Also known as: Sam & Kirk McGee
- Origin: Franklin, Tennessee, U.S.
- Genres: Old-time, Country music, Blues
- Years active: 1925–1975
- Past members: Sam McGee; Kirk McGee

The McGee Brothers were an American old-time performing duo of brothers Sam McGee (Samuel Fleming McGee, May 1, 1894 – August 28, 1975) and Kirk McGee (David Kirkland McGee, November 4, 1899 – October 24, 1983). Sam typically played guitar and Kirk usually played banjo or fiddle, although they were both proficient in multiple string instruments. The McGee Brothers were one of the most enduring acts on the Grand Ole Opry during the show's first fifty years. They made their initial appearance on the Opry in 1926 and the following year joined Uncle Dave Macon's band, the Fruit Jar Drinkers. In the 1930s, the McGees teamed up with early Opry fiddler Arthur Smith to form a string band known as the "Dixieliners," and in the 1940s they played and toured with Bill Monroe and His Bluegrass Boys and several other notable acts.

The McGee Brothers saw a brief resurgence during the folk revival of the 1950s and 1960s, when folk artist Mike Seeger managed to reunite them with Arthur Smith. The brothers made their last major appearance as a duo on the Opry in 1974, although Kirk continued to appear regularly on the program until his death in 1983.

== Early career ==
Sam and Kirk McGee were born and raised in Franklin, Tennessee, a town located just south of Nashville. Their father was a noted fiddler, and both Sam and Kirk learned to play banjo at a young age. As a teenager, Sam picked up slide-guitar and other blues techniques from African-American railroad workers and street musicians in his native Williamson County, and he and Kirk subsequently adapted blues and ragtime styles to the string band format.

Around 1923, Sam and Kirk met Uncle Dave Macon, who had recently gained regional fame as a banjoist and vaudeville performer. In 1926, Sam and Macon appeared together on the WSM Barn Dance (which later became the Grand Ole Opry) and recorded several sides, including Sam's guitar solos, "Buck Dancer's Choice" and "Knoxville Blues." Shortly afterward, a recording scout suggested Macon form a larger band, and Sam, Kirk, guitarist Hubert Gregory, and bassist Golden Stewart joined with Macon as "Uncle Dave Macon and the Fruit Jar Drinkers" (Macon chose the name "Fruit Jar Drinkers", ignoring the fact that another band was already using a similar name). The band made several Opry appearances, and travelled to New York to record several tracks, including "I'm Goin' Away in the Morn" and "Bake That Chicken Pie" (by the time it recorded, the band's line-up had shifted to include Macon's neighbor, fiddler Mazy Todd). At the same sessions, the McGees recorded several tracks as a duo, including "Old Master's Runaway," their version of the American Civil War song "Kingdom Coming," also known "The Year of Jubilo", which was written and composed by Henry Clay Work. Sam also recorded "Chevrolet Car", which he had learned from a mechanic in Nashville, and tried unsuccessfully to sell it to the Chevrolet Corporation. On "Chevrolet Car" and on several tracks recorded with Macon in the late 1920s, Sam played a banjo-guitar, providing rare early instances of this instrument being played effectively.

== 1930s and 1940s ==
While the McGee Brothers continued performing with Macon over the years, by 1930 their main focus had turned to performing as a duo and with fellow Opry pioneer "Fiddlin'" Arthur Smith. In 1931, the McGees and Smith formed the "Dixieliners," a string band named after the railroad where Smith worked. The group toured and made numerous appearances on the Opry, but didn't make any recordings until their reunion two decades later (Smith's "Dixieliner" recordings from the 1930s were accompanied by the Delmore Brothers, rather than the McGees). Sam and Kirk made several recordings during the 1930s as a duo, however, most notably "Brown's Ferry Blues," which they recorded in 1934. Sam also claimed to have been the first performer to play an electric guitar on the Opry, for which he was chided by Opry founder George D. Hay, who told him the electric guitar was not "down to Earth." The Dixieliners disbanded in 1938.

In the 1940s, the McGee Brothers performed with some of the biggest names in country and bluegrass, among them Roy Acuff, Ernest Tubb, and Bill Monroe and the Bluegrass Boys. They also continued making appearances on the Grand Ole Opry, sometimes accompanying their old bandmate, Uncle Dave Macon. Early in the decade, they worked briefly with the comedy act, Sara and Sally.

== Later career ==
The McGee Brothers continued performing throughout the 1950s, both as a duo and occasionally as solo acts. During the folk revival of the late 1950s, the McGees were "rediscovered", and experienced a brief resurgence in popularity. Folk song enthusiast Mike Seeger managed to reunite them with Arthur Smith in 1957, and the trio made several recordings. The trio played at various folk music festivals throughout the 1960s, including a well-received performance at the Newport Folk Festival in 1965. By the 1970s, the McGees were again playing primarily as a duo. They performed at the Opry's last Ryman Auditorium show on March 15, 1974, and as the Opry's senior members, were among the first acts to play at the show's new Opryland venue the following Saturday night. Journalist Garrison Keillor, covering the Opry's move for the New Yorker, described the McGee Brothers' performance thus:

It was the acoustic moment of the show, when the skies cleared and the weeping steels were silent and out of the clear blue came a little ole guitar duet. Stunning and simple, and so good after all the sound I'd hear that week ...

On August 28, 1975, Sam was killed in a tractor accident on the family farm in Williamson County. After Sam's death, Kirk continued performing, mostly as a regular fiddler on the Opry. He died of a heart attack on October 24, 1983, a few days after his last appearance on the program.

== Discography ==
- Sam and Kirk McGee - Old Time Songs and Guitar Tunes (Homestead, 1999)
- Nashville - The Early String Bands, Vol. 1 (County, 2000) — contains the tracks "Salt Lake City Blues", "Chevrolet Car", and "Charming Bill"
- Nashville - The Early String Bands, Vol. 2 (County, 2000) — contains the tracks "Old Master's Runaway" and "Brown's Ferry Blues"
- Classic Old-Time Music (Smithsonian Folkways Recordings, 2003) — contains the track "Don't Let Your Deal Go Down" recorded 1968
