= Ferko String Band =

- Origin: Philadelphia, Pennsylvania
- Genres: String band
- Years active: 1922 – present
- Labels: Alshire, Argo, Media, Palda
- Website: www.ferkostringband.com

The Joseph A. Ferko String Band or Ferko String Band is a perennial performer in Philadelphia's Mummers Parade. They gained national popularity through their hit recordings in the 1940s and 1950s.

== History ==
In 1914 pharmacy student Joseph A. Ferko asked the owner of Fralinger's Drugs to sponsor a string band in the Mummers parade. The request was granted, and Ferko led the "Fralinger String Band" for several years, placing third in their 1915 attempt but winning in 1920.

The "Ferko String Band" had its beginnings in 1922. Ferko left the Fralinger pharmacy in 1921 to open his own establishment. He led the "North Philadelphia String Band" for the 1922 parade, but later that year founded his own band, co-founded by Walter Butterworth and Charles Keegan.

Ferko first won the string-band division in 1927 with an entry entitled "Cards." The 1929 incarnation not only won the event, but it was estimated that its parade float was the largest ever up to that point.

In addition to the Mummers Parade, Ferko also has a long history of performing in various parades and special occasions within the United States, Canada, as well as places far away as France and Hong Kong.

Although Ferko has always been primarily purposed for Philadelphia, highlights of 1929 contests culminated in top placement in contests in New York, Atlantic City, Baltimore, Washington, and York, PA.

They played for Franklin D. Roosevelt's 1933 Presidential inauguration.

Although Philadelphia string bands had been exclusively a "male's club", in 1935 Joseph Ferko started a ladies' auxiliary which brought women into club activities. This action influenced other string bands to follow suit, although female participation in the actual parade was almost non-existent until the late 1970s.

In 1947 they began recording sessions at the WIP studio for the Miller Brothers' new Palda Records. Their recording of "Four Leaf Clover" was picked up for national distribution by King Records. This prompted Paul Miller to commission new songs specifically for Ferko. One of the resulting songs, "Heartbreaker", became a national hit, in part thanks to the 1948 musician's strike because as amateur musicians, they were not covered by the American Federation of Musicians.

The profits from these Ferko records would later enable the Miller brothers to launch the career of Bill Haley. By Spring 1948 Billboard estimated they were among the top 25 musical attractions in 5 out of 8 national regions, and most popular in the Southeast United States where they ranked number 18 among all musical acts.

In May 1948, the band appeared on the cover of Billboard, in which it was announced that they had sold more than 350,000 records for Palda, and that their theme song "Hello", written by bandmembers Harry Leary and Robert Traub, was selected for use at the Republican National Convention.

Their 1955 recording of "Alabama Jubilee" sold more than 1 million records.

The group found popularity in Germany in 1956 with a recording of "Happy Days Are Here Again", charting as high as position 15. By the late 1950s the band was funded by the Continental Baking Company.

Founder Joseph A. Ferko died in 1964.

The group's 2013 performance aroused controversy when their theme for the year was perceived to have alluded to blackface minstrelsy in a performance entitled "Ferko's Bringin’ Back the Minstrel Days". The performance celebrated the music of Al Jolson and his contributions to early American music and theater. This performance was criticized by some, for the portrayal of performers within a vaudeville act, including the University of Pennsylvania professor of Africana Studies Guthrie Ramsey, among others.

== Performance style ==
The band typically has around 60 performing members, but recorded performances can involve anywhere from a couple dozen to a couple hundred participants. The age of group members is wide-ranging, known to encompass members from 15 to 80 years old. Performances consist of familiar tunes arranged specifically for the band.

Instruments used include accordion, banjo, bells, drums, Glockenspiel, guitar, mandolin, saxophone, and violin The details of musical balance are largely ignored yet often achieved. The elaborate costumes are such essential part of the performance that a 1995 theft of the apparel caused the cancellation of several shows. Marching maneuvers are a typical part of the presentation.

== Appearances in film and television ==
The Ferko String Band can be seen briefly in the movie Miracle on 34th Street. They have also appeared on the television shows Good Morning America, The Jackie Gleason Show, To Tell the Truth and I've Got a Secret, with host Gary Moore, and Today.

== Philadelphia Mummers Parade results ==
| Year | Awards |
|---|---|
| 1923 | 2nd – musical |
| 1924 | 3rd – musical |
| 1925 | 2nd – musical |
| 1926 | 2nd – musical |
| 1927 | 1st – musical |
| 1928 | 3rd – musical |
| 1929 | 1st – musical |
| 1930 | 1st – musical |
| 1931 | 1st – musical |
| 1932 | 1st – musical |
| 1933 | no official parade |
| 1934 | no official parade |
| 1935 | 3rd – musical |
| 1936 | 1st |
| 1937 | 1st |
| 1938 | 1st |
| 1939 | 1st |
| 1940 | 3rd – musical |
| 1941 | 5th – musical |
| 1942 | 2nd – musical |
| 1943 | 6th – musical |
| 1944 | 2nd – musical |
| 1945 | 3rd – musical |
| 1946 | 4th – musical |
| 1947 | 1st – musical |
| 1948 | 2nd – musical |
| 1949 | 2nd – musical |
| 1950 | 1st – musical |
| 1951 | 1st – musical |
| 1952 | 2nd – musical |
| 1953 | 2nd – musical |
| 1954 | 2nd – musical |
| 1955 | 9th – musical |
| 1956 | 4th (tie) – musical |
| 1957 | 3rd – musical |
| 1958 | 1st – musical |
| 1959 | 4th – musical |
| 1960 | 4th – musical |
| 1961 | 2nd |
| 1962 | 4th – musical |
| 1963 | 5th – musical |
| 1964 | 4th – musical |
| 1965 | 3rd – musical |
| 1966 | 6th – musical |
| 1967 | 2nd – musical |
| 1968 | 2nd – musical |
| 1969 | 1st – musical |
| 1970 | 5th – musical |
| 1971 | 5th – musical |
| 1972 | 3rd – musical |
| 1973 | 4th – musical |
| 1974 | 1st – musical |
| 1975 | 3rd – musical |
| 1976 | 13th – musical |
| 1977 | 3rd – musical |
| 1978 | 6th – musical |
| 1979 | 2nd – musical |
| 1980 | 2nd – musical |
| 1981 | 4th – musical |
| 1982 | 1st – musical |
| 1983 | 4th (tie) – musical |
| 1984 | 5th – musical |
| 1985 | 2nd – musical |
| 1986 | 4th – musical |
| 1987 | 6th – musical |
| 1988 | 4th – musical |
| 1989 | 4th – musical |
| 1990 | 3rd – musical |
| 1991 | 5th – musical |
| 1992 | 4th (tie) – musical |
| 1993 | 2nd – musical |
| 1994 | 1st – musical |
| 1995 | 2nd – musical |
| 1996 | 1st – musical |
| 1997 | 1st – musical |
| 1998 | 1st – musical |
| 1999 | 3rd – musical |
| 2000 | 3rd – musical |
| 2001 | 5th – musical |
| 2002 | 4th – musical |
| 2003 | 3rd – musical |
| 2004 | 4th – musical |
| 2005 | 4th – musical |
| 2006 | 3rd – musical |
| 2007 | 3rd (tie) – musical |
| 2008 | 4th – musical |
| 2009 | 4th – musical |
| 2010 | 2nd – overall 1st – musical 5th – Captain |
| 2011 | 2nd – musical 4th – Captain |
| 2012 | 4th – musical 5th – Anthony Celenza, Captain |
| 2013 | 5th – musical 11th – Anthony Celenza, Captain |
| 2014 | 6th – musical 2nd – Anthony Celenza, Captain |
| 2015 | 5th – musical Tied for 3rd – Anthony Celenza, Captain |
| 2016 | 2nd – musical 6th – Anthony Celenza, Captain |
| 2017 | 5th – musical 1st – Thomas D'Amore, Captain |
| 2018 | 5th – musical Tied for 4th – Thomas D'Amore, Captain |
| 2019 | 6th – musical 4th – Thomas D'Amore, Captain |
| 2020 | 9th – musical 12th – Michael Luciany, Captain |
| 2022 | 10th – musical 13th – Anthony Celenza, Captain |
| 2023 | 6th – musical 10th – Anthony Celenza, Captain |
| 2024 | 7th – musical 11th – John Evans, Captain |
| 2025 | 9th – musical 8th – Scott Ratzke, Captain |

== Discography ==
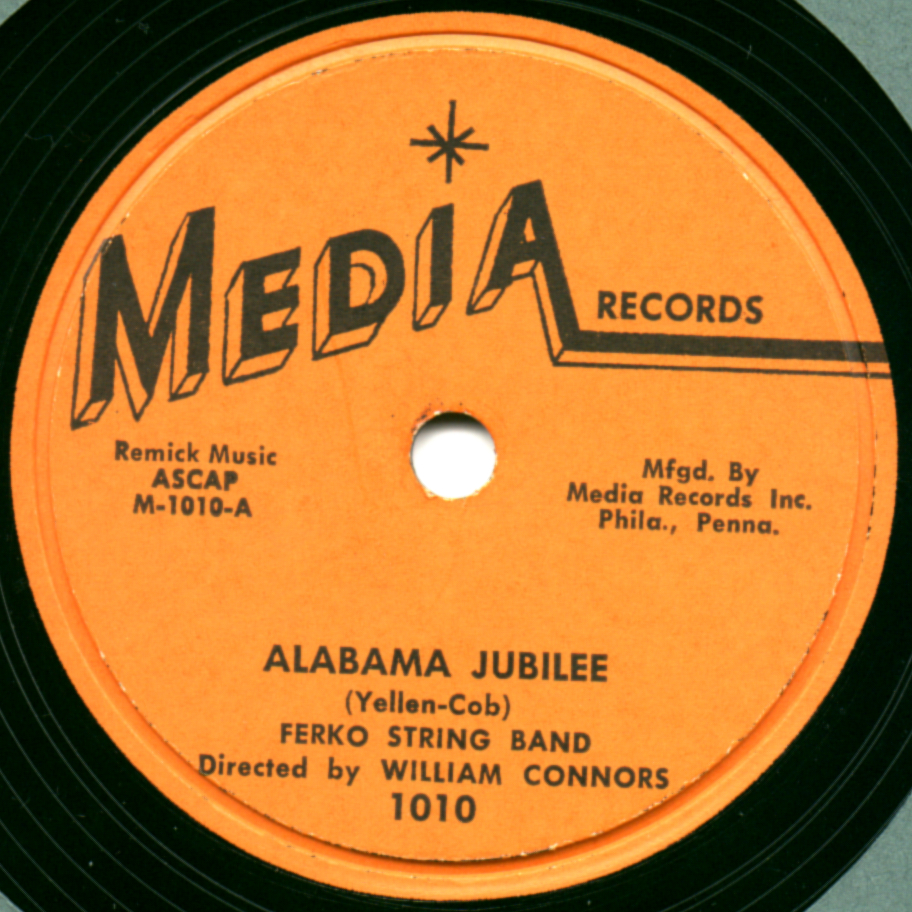
"Alabama Jubilee", Ferko's biggest selling record

=== Singles ===
| Year | Title | Peak chart positions | B-side | Issued on | Album |
|---|---|---|---|---|---|
| 1947 | Dilly Dally Polka | - | When You Wore a Tulip | Palda 101 | |
| 1947 | Hello | - | Golden Slippers | Palda 102 | |
| 1948 | Bowery Boys | - | I Want a Girl | Palda 104 | |
| 1948 | Alma mater – Cornell U. | - | Fight On, Penn. | Palda 105 | |
| 1948 | Auld Lang Syne | - | Drunkard's Medley | Palda 106 | |
| 1948 | Heartbreaker | 21 | Kelly & H-A-R-R-I-G-A-N | Palda 109 | |
| 1948 | (I'm Looking Over a) Four Leaf Clover | - | Heart of My Heart | Palda 110 | |
| 1948 | Alibi Baby | - | Roll 'Em Girls | Palda 114 | |
| 1948 | Two Timer | - | You Darlin' | Palda 116 | |
| 1955 | Alabama Jubilee | 14 | Sing a Little Melody | Media 1010 | |
| 1955 | You Are My Sunshine | 29* | Ma (She's Making Eyes At Me) | Media 1013 | *"Coming Up Strong" chart |
| 1963 | Golden Slipper Strut | - | Ferko's Monkey | Argo 5451 | |

=== Albums ===
- Circa 1956 – 'Happy Days Are Here Again' , Somerset Stereo—Fidelity – 33 rpm 12-inch LP. Reissued on CD in 1990 on Alshire.
