= Nina Cried Power =

2018 song by Hozier

Single by Hozier featuring Mavis Staples

from the album Wasteland, Baby!
- Released: 6 September 2018
- Length: 3:45
- Label: Rubyworks; Island
- Songwriter: Hozier
- Producers: Hozier; Markus Dravs

Hozier singles chronology
"Better Love" (2016)	"Nina Cried Power" (2018)	"Movement" (2018)

Music video
- "Nina Cried Power" on YouTube

"Nina Cried Power" is a song recorded by Irish singer-songwriter Hozier, featuring vocals from American rhythm and blues and gospel singer Mavis Staples. It was released on 6 September 2018 as the lead single from Hozier's second studio album Wasteland, Baby!.

== Writing and composition ==
"Nina Cried Power" is the first track on the album, written by Hozier alone. The song is described as a "soulful anthem" and contains blues and gospel influences, with subtle piano, a playful drumbeat, and soothing guitar rhythm. The lyrics namecheck the artist-activists of previous generations, including Woody Guthrie, Billie Holiday, James Brown, Curtis Mayfield, B. B. King, Marvin Gaye, Pete Seeger, Patti LaBelle, Bob Dylan, John Lennon, Joni Mitchell, contributing vocalist Mavis Staples, and the titular Nina Simone; the naming of the track is a nod to Simone's recording of "Sinnerman", which features the lyric "I cried power". The song describes their work as the "hearing of a human spirit ringing". "Nina Cried Power" salutes their contributions to the protest music of the American Civil Rights Movement, declaring that "It's not the waking, it's the rising."

After touring his debut album, Hozier took a one-year hiatus from his work, residing in Ireland, to "re-connect". He stated that he became a "news junkie" and wrote much of the album's material "trying to reconcile" his own "concerns and anxieties" regarding humanity when the Doomsday Clock moved to two minutes to midnight in 2018. Staples influenced the record's musical conception; "Nina Cried Power" was originally written on the piano while Hozier strove to make "music that hit a little bit harder, that leaned in to rhythm a little bit more". Hozier has stated that his musical education was "grounded" in Chicago blues artists like Nina Simone and many of the artists receiving nods in the song have frequently been cited as his influences; he has previously stressed the importance of "crediting the legacy you're crediting".

== Critical response ==
"Nina Cried Power" was lauded by critics. The Telegraph stated that he upheld the legacies of the aforementioned artists with "purposeful swagger" while The Irish Times wrote that "from the first track, Hozier fuses his righteous political anger ("It is the bringing of the line, it is the baring of the rhyme, it’s not the waking it’s the rising") with what you can only call a "tune", citing it as "a tree-flattening tour de force that explores broad themes of protest and liberation." PopMatters stated that "Hozier...uses the performer's legacy to inspire action and disrupt apathy. This is the poignant reminder that the work these artist-activists set in motion still needs redressing and enacting ... as an opener, "Nina Cries Power" is an inspirational triumph concertizing the single's place in the history of protest music." Consequence of Sound praised the opening track for its "upbeat, joyous quality, testifying to the emotional material to come".

== Commercial performance ==
The song peaked at number ten on the Irish Singles Chart, scoring Top 50 positions in the Netherlands, Scotland, New Zealand, and Belgium.

== Music video ==
This song was intended as a thank you note to the spirit and legacy of protest; to the artists who imbued their work with the vigour of dissent, and a reflection on the importance of that tradition in the context of the rights, and lives, we enjoy today. My hope for this video is much the same.

— Hozier, The Irish Times

The official music video for "Nina Cried Power" was released on 12 September 2018. It was directed by Patrick Ryan and Jon Hozier-Byrne, Hozier's brother, and features a slew of Irish activists, including Sinéad Burke, Eamonn McCann, and Bernadette McAliskey. The video was filmed in Dublin, and features the activists wearing headphones while wordlessly reacting to the powerful anthem for the first time. The video has amassed over 13 million views on YouTube.

== Personnel ==
Personnel from Wasteland, Baby! liner notes.

- A. Hozier-Byrne – vocals, guitar, Wurlitzer, mono synth, claps
- Mavis Staples – vocals
- Alex Ryan – bass, piano, claps
- Rory Doyle – drums, claps
- Booker T. Jones – organ
- Lurine Cato – background vocals
- Priscilla Jones-Campbell – background vocals
- Paul Clarvis – shaker, tambourine
- Markus Dravs – mono synth, bass synth, claps

== Charts ==
Chart performance for "Nina Cried Power"
Chart (2018)	Peak position
Belgium (Ultratip Bubbling Under Flanders)	30
Belgium (Ultratip Bubbling Under Wallonia)	33
Ireland (IRMA)	10
Netherlands Single Tip (MegaCharts)	28
New Zealand Hot Singles (RMNZ)	27
Scottish Singles Sales (Official Charts)	42
UK Singles (Official Charts)	87
US Adult Alternative Airplay (Billboard)	1
US Alternative Airplay (Billboard)	31
US Hot Rock & Alternative Songs (Billboard)	13
US Rock & Alternative Airplay (Billboard)	25

== Certifications ==
Certifications for "Nina Cried Power"
Region	Certification	Certified units/sales
Canada (Music Canada)	Gold	40,000^{‡}
^{‡} Sales+streaming figures based on certification alone.
