= Movement (Hozier song) =

2018 song by Hozier

Single by Hozier

from the album Wasteland, Baby!
- Released: 14 November 2018
- Length: 3:57
- Label: Rubyworks; Island
- Songwriter: Hozier
- Producers: Hozier; Markus Dravs

Hozier singles chronology
"Nina Cried Power" (2018)	"Movement" (2018)	"Almost (Sweet Music)" (2019)

Music video
- "Movement" on YouTube

"Movement" is a song recorded by Irish singer-songwriter Hozier for his second studio album, Wasteland, Baby!. It was released on 14 November 2018 as the second single from the record, peaking at number forty on the Irish Singles Chart.

== Writing and composition ==
"Movement" is the third track from the album, written solely by Hozier. "Movement" was first written on the piano, and is a gospel-pop and R&B ballad with "intense emotionality", "twinkling' keys and organs, and slow-build, stomp-clap to the track. The lyrics reference "Jonah on the ocean" and Fred Astaire, illustrating "the summons of love as an awe-inspiring dance."

== Critical reception ==
"Movement" received mixed reviews from critics. Billboard praised the track, saying "the emotional song touches on the beauty of movement, as Hozier sings about watching the subject dancing freely." while NPR stated that ""Movement," leans hard into Hozier's gifts for crafting songs that radiate waves of soaring intensity [...] and drama build[s] quietly." Pitchfork dismissed it, writing that the "murk of the song mostly invites you to avert eye contact from the back of the room" while The Independent likened it to a "church march to which the bride enters a disappointing wedding night."

== Commercial performance ==
The song peaked at number eleven on the Billboard Digital Sales Chart.

== Music video ==
The official music video for "Movement" was released on 14 November 2018. The video was directed by British filmmakers Chris Barrett and Luke Taylor and featured dancer Sergei Polunin, paying tribute to the "emotional physicality of dance" alongside the lyrics. The video has amassed over 32 million views on YouTube.

== Personnel ==
Personnel from "Wasteland, Baby!" liner notes.

- A. Hozier-Byrne – vocals, guitar, claps
- Alex Ryan – bass, piano, Rhodes, claps
- Rory Doyle – drums, claps
- Booker T. Jones – organ
- Paul Clarvis – shaker, bells
- Ian Berryman – claps
- Markus Dravs – kick drum programming, synth, claps

== Charts ==
Chart (2018)	Peak position
Belgium (Ultratip Bubbling Under Flanders)	14
Belgium (Ultratip Bubbling Under Wallonia)	33
Hot Canadian Digital Song Sales (Billboard)	17
Ireland (IRMA)	40
New Zealand Hot Singles (RMNZ)	26
UK Singles Downloads (Official Charts)	91
US Digital Song Sales (Billboard)	11

== Certifications ==
Region	Certification	Certified units/sales
Brazil (Pro-Música Brasil)	Gold	20,000^{‡}
Canada (Music Canada)	Platinum	80,000^{‡}
New Zealand (RMNZ)	Platinum	30,000^{‡}
United Kingdom (BPI)	Silver	200,000^{‡}
United States (RIAA)	Platinum	1,000,000^{‡}
^{‡} Sales+streaming figures based on certification alone.
