= Wasteland, Baby! =

Studio album by Hozier
- Released: 1 March 2019
- Recorded: September 2017 – February 2019
- Studio: RAK (London); Casa-D (London); DTLA Recording (Los Angeles); Herbert Place (Dublin); Vox (Los Angeles); Effie Street (Los Angeles)
- Genre: Soul; blues
- Length: 57:21
- Label: Rubyworks; Island
- Producer: Hozier; Markus Dravs; Rob Kirwan; Ariel Rechtshaid

Hozier chronology
Nina Cried Power (2018)	Wasteland, Baby! (2019)	Eat Your Young (2023)

Singles from Wasteland, Baby!
- 1. "Nina Cried Power" Released: 6 September 2018; 2. "Movement" Released: 14 November 2018; 3. "Almost (Sweet Music)" Released: 16 January 2019; 4. "Dinner & Diatribes" Released: 15 February 2019

Wasteland, Baby! is the second studio album by Irish musician Hozier, released on 1 March 2019 by Rubyworks Records. It is Hozier's first album since 2014. The album includes the songs "Nina Cried Power" and "Shrike" from the 2018 EP Nina Cried Power as well as the single "Movement". It was promoted by a North American tour beginning in March 2019 and a European tour in late summer to fall 2019. Wasteland, Baby! debuted atop the Irish Albums Chart and the Billboard 200 and has since been certified gold in the US.

== Background and writing ==
After touring his debut album, Hozier took a one-year hiatus from his work, moving back to Ireland to "reconnect". He stated that he became a "news junkie" and wrote much of the album's material "trying to reconcile" his own "concerns and anxieties" regarding humanity when the Doomsday Clock moved two minutes to midnight in 2018. The themes encompass apocalyptic imagery in "cultural" and "moral wastelands" within a backdrop of personal connection and intimacy; influenced by the seeking of "hope" and "warmth" amidst major global events such as climate change, the European migrant crisis, the rise of neo-nationalism and Brexit. Such doubling concepts are expanded on in tracks like "Shrike", "Be", "No Plan" and "Wasteland, Baby!".

Of course, despair and fatigue, they absolutely creep in, and they certainly did at many points. A lot of people, certainly like a lot of Irish people … have a very, very close, healthy relationship with despair, which is not always a bad thing; you know what I mean?...I think there’s wonderful things to explore in that...we’re living in very interesting times, and in many ways, unprecedented times. I’ve always held that there’s always that holding onto a sort of optimism [...] finding some silver lining, something to hang onto, and something that provides you with some amount of hope and gives you some sense of faith in people and faith in the kindness that people are capable of...That’s what a lot of the songs on the record were trying to reach for.

— Hozier on the intertwining themes of Wasteland, Baby!, RIFF

"Wasteland, Baby!"
Wasteland, Baby!'s titular track reiterates themes central to the album including love and redemption within apocalyptic themes.

The album's lyrical and musical conception was influenced by featuring artist Mavis Staples as well as the literature of T.S Eliot, W. B. Yeats and Seamus Heaney. Stylistically, Hozier aimed for "music that hit a little bit harder, that leaned into rhythm a little bit more" than his debut record. He first came up with the ideas for "Movement" and "Nina Cried Power" on the piano and states that he had a "bad habit" of "trying to write six, seven, eight songs at once" while writing the record. Hozier has stated that he was "reluctant" to draw inspiration from tour life, with the months he spent at home in the Irish countryside "living a normal life enabled [him] to absorb things". Hozier spent the last 18 months prior to Wasteland, Baby!'s release working on the album. The exclamation mark in the title of the album is “quite important,” and signifies “ the wry smile” in his lyricism, blending "experiences of devastation and joy".

== Music and lyrics ==
Wasteland, Baby! is just under an hour long, containing fourteen tracks in total. The record features a guest appearances from blues singer and civil rights activist Mavis Staples on "Nina Cried Power" and instrumentalist Booker T. Jones on "Be" and "Sunlight". The tracks were written entirely by Hozier with the exception of "As It Was", which was co-written with Alex Ryan. The album was produced by Hozier, Markus Dravs, Rob Kirwan, and Ariel Rechtshaid. Wasteland, Baby! is a soul R&B and folk-influenced record. The album features gospel choral backing, pulpit-rattling percussion gentle vocals, and varied instrumentation with bluesy organs and guitar containing a mix of pop-culture references and personal sentiment. The album also returns to Biblical and naturalistic imagery, invoking romantic symbolism.

=== Songs ===
"Nina Cried Power" opens the album with a bluesy, soulful track featuring a strong drumbeat and supporting vocals by Mavis Staples. It sees Hozier lyrically reference artists he found inspirational during the song-writing process - among those mentioned are Nina Simone, Billie Holiday, Bob Dylan, Woody Guthrie and Duke Ellington. The following track, "Almost (Sweet Music)," also refers to American popular music.

"Nina Cried Power"
The lead single of Wasteland, Baby!, "Nina Cried Power" is a soul-inspired track with gospel chorals featuring Mavis Staples in paying tribute to the artist-activists that inspire Hozier's music, including the titular Nina Simone.

Many tracks on the album, like the aforementioned "Nina Cried Power" as well as "Movement" and "To Noise Making (Sing)", feature a gospel choir. "Movement" is an R&B ballad that compares the summons of love to an awe-inspiring dance, while the latter features a one-word refrain with dreamy, echoing vocals.

"Shrike" is among many folk-inspired tracks on the album, which sees Hozier lamenting his inability to voice his lost love - the title an ode to the Shrike bird. "Dinner & Diatribes" marks a slight stylistic change, and is more country-influenced. "Sunlight" features a funk-organ and lyrical allusion, comparing the gospel of love to the myth of Icarus.

"Wasteland, Baby!" concludes the album with love ballad featuring subtle acoustics and soft utterances, depicting a tender romance against the backdrop of the apocalypse. This dystopian theme runs deep within the album's lyricism, featured in tracks like "Be" which discusses global crises and humanity's flawed past, and "No Plan" which addresses the state and fate of universe with harsh lyricism, inspired by astrophysicist Katie Mack.

== Release and promotion ==
Hozier announced the track listing in a video posted to Twitter, showing himself writing it down and then displaying it. The album pre-order became available with the track "Almost (Sweet Music)". Wasteland, Baby! was released on 1 March 2019, debuting atop the US Billboard 200 chart. The album cover was painted by Hozier's mother from posed pictures of the artist in a staged, underwater set.

=== Singles ===
"Nina Cried Power" was released as the lead single off the album on 6 September 2018. "Movement" was released as the second single off the album on 14 November 2018. A music video for the song was also released on the same day. "Almost (Sweet Music)" was released as the third single off the album, along with the album pre-order, on 16 January 2019. A music video for the song was released on 16 April 2019. "Dinner & Diatribes" was released as the fourth single off the album on 15 February 2019. A music video for the song was released on 6 March 2019.

== Critical reception ==
Professional ratings
Aggregate scores
Source	Rating
AnyDecentMusic?	6.2/10
Metacritic	63/100
Review scores
Source	Rating
AllMusic	3.5/5 stars
The Arts Desk	3/5 stars
Consequence of Sound	B+
The Daily Telegraph	5/5 stars
The Guardian	3/5 stars
The Independent	2/5 stars
The Irish Times	4/5 stars
Pitchfork	4.8/10
PopMatters	7/10
Rolling Stone	3/5 stars

Wasteland, Baby! received generally positive reviews from music critics. At Metacritic, which assigns a normalised rating out of 100 to reviews from mainstream critics, the album received an average score of 63, based on 10 reviews.

Positive reviews include AllMusic's Stephen Thomas Erlewine, who called the album "a subtle but notable shift that lends emotional gravity to a singer/songwriter who already favored weighty topics." Michael Pementel of Consequence of Sound stated "from the blend of instrumentals to the enchanting use of Hozier's voice, Wasteland, Baby! is an album that celebrates emotion and the wonder of music." Neil McCormick of The Daily Telegraph gave the album a perfect score, claiming Hozier to be "a talent to rival Jeff Buckley". Tony Clayton-Lea of The Irish Times said "despite a hiccup or two, without which would have made for a five-star record – it's a very welcome one." Elisabeth Woronzoff of PopMatters stated that Hozier needed the album "to recapture the energy created by his previous releases then further light the artist's skill and vision of his craft." And that it "certainly delivers while edifying the artist as an impactful voice in the art and activism sphere."

Mixed reviews include The Arts Desk's Russ Coffey, who said that the album's "finer moments – and there are many – come where he balances his natural despondency with some positivity." Damien Morris of The Guardian stated "it's a lovely sound, but the songwriting veers more towards the serviceable than the inspired." Jonathan Bernstein of Rolling Stone claimed the album "has enough encouraging displays of maturation to feel like a transitional moment for Hozier. At its best, the album carves out a space for the singer to work out his creative tensions as he finds new ways to make his straight folk influences more accessible without losing anything along the way."

Negative reviews include The Independent's Mark Beaumont, claiming "Hozier has some pertinent points to make on an album that improves dramatically in the second half." Sam Sodomsky of Pitchfork said "the man who took us to church tries to take us to the same church, again, 14 times, six years later."

== Commercial performance ==
Wasteland, Baby! debuted at number one on the Irish Albums Chart and the US Billboard 200, earning 89,000 album-equivalent units in the latter country (including 75,000 pure album sales). It is Hozier's first US number-one album.

== Track listing ==
All tracks written by Andrew Hozier-Byrne; "As It Was" co-written by Alex Ryan. All tracks co-produced by Markus Dravs, unless otherwise noted.

Wasteland, Baby! track listing
No.	Title	Producer(s)	Length
1.	"Nina Cried Power" (featuring Mavis Staples)		3:45
2.	"Almost (Sweet Music)"		3:37
3.	"Movement"		3:57
4.	"No Plan"		5:31
5.	"Nobody"	Hozier; Ariel Rechtshaid	3:30
6.	"To Noise Making (Sing)"	Hozier; Rechtshaid	3:26
7.	"As It Was"	Hozier; Rob Kirwan	3:27
8.	"Shrike"	Hozier; Kirwan	4:58
9.	"Talk"		3:26
10.	"Be"		4:49
11.	"Dinner & Diatribes"	Hozier; Kirwan	3:44
12.	"Would That I"		4:28
13.	"Sunlight"		4:17
14.	"Wasteland, Baby!"		4:26
Total length:			57:21

== Personnel ==
Musicians

- Andrew Hozier-Byrne – vocals, guitar (all tracks); Wurlitzer (1), synthesizer (1, 4, 8, 11, 14), claps (1–4, 9–13), piano (2, 12), snaps (2, 9), shaker (2, 9, 10), percussion (8, 9, 12), bells (9), organ (9, 12, 14), bongos, drums, tambourine (12); programming (13)
- Mavis Staples – vocals (1)
- Alex Ryan – bass (1–13), piano (1, 3, 4, 7, 9, 10, 12, 13), claps (1–3, 10, 11, 13), Wurlitzer (2, 4, 7, 9, 14), snaps (2), Rhodes piano (3, 4, 7, 9), keyboards (8), synth bass (11), percussion (8, 12), drums, tambourine (12)
- Rory Doyle – drums (1, 3, 4, 10–13), claps (1–3, 10, 11, 13), kick drum (2, 9), snaps (2), percussion (8, 11, 12), tambourine (12)
- Booker T. Jones – organ (1–3, 10, 13)
- Lurine Cato – background vocals (1, 10, 13)
- Priscilla Jones-Campbell – background vocals (1, 10, 13)
- Paul Clarvis – shaker (1, 3, 4, 13), tambourine (1, 2, 10), bells (3)
- Ian Berryman – claps (3, 10, 13)
- Markus Dravs – synthesizer (1, 3), synth bass (1, 12), claps (1, 3, 10, 12, 13), programming (3, 4, 9, 12, 13), Roland Juno (10), drums (12)
- Nell Catchpole – violin (4)
- Matt Bauder – baritone saxophone, cornet (5)
- Buddy Ross – organ, celesta (5); piano, Wurlitzer, synthesizer, Orchestron (6)
- Aaron Redfield – drums (5)
- Kate Urcioli – trombone (5)
- Jackie Gouche Ferris – background vocals (6)
- Judith Hill – background vocals (6)
- Lynn Mabry – background vocals (6)
- Sarah Lynch – violin (7, 8)

Technical

- Greg Calbi – mastering
- Mike Crossey – mixing (1)
- Shawn Everett – mixing (2, 4, 5)
- Andrew Scheps – mixing (3, 7–14)
- Ariel Rechtshaid – mixing (6)
- Robbie Nelson – engineering (1–4, 9, 10, 12–14)
- Iain Berryman – engineering (1–4, 9, 10, 12–14)
- Markus Dravs – engineering (1)
- Dave Schiffman – engineering (5, 6)
- Ben Tolliday – engineering (7, 8, 11)
- Nick Rowe – editing (5, 6)
- Nathaniel Graham – engineering assistance (1–4, 9–14)
- Stephen Sesso – engineering assistance (1)
- Jim Caroll – engineering assistance (1)
- Rachel Bloom – engineering assistance (1)
- Ivan Wayman – engineering assistance (2, 4, 5)
- Chris Kasych – engineering assistance (5, 6)
- John DeBold – engineering assistance (5, 6)
- PJ Ronan – engineering assistance (7, 8, 11)
- Misha Hercules – engineering assistance (7, 8, 11)

Artwork

- Andrew Hozier-Byrne – art direction
- Raine Hozier-Byrne – art direction, cover painting
- Mark James – design
- Lucy Nuzum – photography

== Charts ==
=== Weekly charts ===
Weekly chart performance for Wasteland, Baby!
Chart (2019)	Peak position
Australian Albums (ARIA)	8
Austrian Albums (Ö3 Austria)	18
Belgian Albums (Ultratop Flanders)	19
Belgian Albums (Ultratop Wallonia)	54
Canadian Albums (Billboard)	9
Czech Albums (ČNS IFPI)	83
Dutch Albums (Album Top 100)	17
French Albums (SNEP)	90
German Albums (Offizielle Top 100)	15
Irish Albums (IRMA)	1
Latvian Albums (LAIPA)	26
Lithuanian Albums (AGATA)	11
New Zealand Albums (RMNZ)	9
Polish Albums (ZPAV)	36
Scottish Albums (OCC)	3
Spanish Albums (Promusicae)	88
Swedish Albums (Sverigetopplistan)	43
Swiss Albums (Schweizer Hitparade)	16
UK Albums (OCC)	6
US Billboard 200	1
US Top Alternative Albums (Billboard)	1
US Americana/Folk Albums (Billboard)	1
US Top Rock Albums (Billboard)	1

2024 weekly chart performance for Wasteland, Baby!
Chart (2024)	Peak position
Dutch Albums (Album Top 100)	3

=== Year-end charts ===
Year-end chart performance for Wasteland, Baby!
Chart (2019)	Position
Irish Albums (IRMA)	17
US Top Rock Albums (Billboard)	34

== Certifications ==
Certifications for Wasteland, Baby!
Region	Certification	Certified units/sales
Brazil (Pro-Música Brasil)	Platinum	40,000^{‡}
Brazil (Pro-Música Brasil) Special Edition	Platinum	40,000^{‡}
Canada (Music Canada)	Platinum	80,000^{‡}
Denmark (IFPI Danmark)	Gold	10,000^{‡}
Poland (ZPAV)	Gold	10,000^{‡}
United Kingdom (BPI)	Gold	100,000^{‡}
United States (RIAA)	Platinum	1,000,000^{‡}
^{‡} Sales+streaming figures based on certification alone.
