= John & Emery McClung =

John & Emery McClung were musicians who recorded old-time music during the 1920s. They also recorded as The West Virginia Snake Hunters and The McClung Brothers. John Edward McClung (who was the guitar player and singer) was born on August 1, 1906, in Mount Hope, West Virginia, and died on February 15, 1991. Emery Samuel McClung (who was the fiddle player) was born on January 3, 1910, in Beckley, West Virginia, and he died on March 9, 1970.

== Biography ==
John and Emery were sons of Caroline Elizabeth Cheetham and Park Walker McClung who were from Raleigh County, West Virginia. Their father Walker was a jeweler but he was also a music teacher and a choir leader of the church they attended in Sprague, West Virginia. Many of Walker's fourteen children learned to play instruments or sing from him.

The failing health of their father led John and Emery to start making music on Beckley street corners to help raise grocery money. In the early 1920s, they formed a string band called The West Virginia Trail Blazers, which included George Ward and John Lanchester, both from Beckley, West Virginia. They took their shows all around the mountains in a big Studebaker, even going to California on one occasion. This band was kept together until about 1934.

In 1927, John and Emery recorded eight songs for Brunswick Records. John played the fiddle and Emery played guitar. The whistling on the songs "Standin' In The Need Of Prayer," "Birdie," and "The Fun Is All Over" were provided by future Country Music Hall of Fame member Carson Robison. They also called themselves The West Virginia Snake Hunters during this time, and started working with carnival musician Cleve Chaffin, who was from Wayne County, West Virginia. Chaffin and the McClung Brothers recorded six songs for Paramount Records in 1929. Chaffin had also recorded with another old-time music band, Fruit Jar Guzzlers. After the session for Paramount, Chaffin and the McClung Brothers never recorded again. Later on, the McClung Brothers had a gospel quartet on the radio station WJLS in Beckley. John won an old-time fiddlers' contest in Beckley in August 1950, and Emery won second place. John lived his retired life in Alexandria, Virginia.

One of the most popular McClung Brothers' songs was "The West Virginia Hills," which was a parody of the West Virginia state anthem about West Virginia moonshine. The McClungs never recorded it but their friend Roy Harvey (also from West Virginia) recorded it as a duet with Earl Shirkey on Columbia Records in 1929. Harvey's version can be found on two CDs Roy Harvey: Complete Recorded Works In Chronological Order Volume 3 (Document 8052) and Roy Harvey: Early String Band Favorites (Old Homestead 4017), both released in 1999.

== Singles ==
=== The West Virginia Snake Hunters ===
- "Standin' In The Need Of Prayer" / "Walk In The Streets Of Glory" (Brunswick 119) (3/1927)

=== John & Emery McClung ===
- "Birdie" / "The Fun Is All Over" (Brunswick 134) (3/1927) (released 5/1927)
- "Chicken" / "Liza Jane" (Brunswick 135) (3/1927)
- "It's A Long Way To Tipperary" / "When You Wore A Tulip" (Brunswick 136) (3/1927)

=== Cleve Chaffin & The McClung Brothers ===
- "Babylon Is Falling Down" / "I Got A Home In The Beulah Land" (Paramount 3160) (3/1929)
- "Trail Blazer's Favorites" / "Alabama Jubilee" (Paramount 3161) (3/1929)
- "Rock House Gamblers" / "Curtains Of Night" (Paramount 3179) (3/1929)

== Various artists compilations ==
- My Rough And Rowdy Ways Volume One (Yazoo 2039) (1998)
- Old Time Music Of West Virginia Volume One (County CD-3518) (1999)
- Old Time Music Of West Virginia Volume Two (County CD-3519) (1999)
- The Half Ain’t Never Been Told Volume Two (Yazoo 2050) (1999)
- Old Country Gospel (Vintage78 C-11) (cassette)
- Country Music Classic (Vintage78 C-53) (cassette)
- Paramount Old Time Recordings (JSP) (3-CD set) (2006)
- Old Time Tunes And Songs Volume 2: 1924-1952 (B.A.C.M 364) (2012)
