= Orquestra Mahatma =

British band

Orquestra Mahatma (sometimes credited as Orqestra Mahatma) is an eclectic UK band which draws heavily on international music including Spanish, French, Bulgarian, Macedonian and Latin-American as well as jazz influences.

The members of the Orquestra are violinist Sonia Slany, string player Stuart Hall, bassist Thad Kelly and drummer Paul Clarvis.

== Discography ==
- Nightingale of a Thousand Joys (a 1999 Collaboration with Solid Strings).
1. Diminuendo In Blue
2. Nyari/Hora Din Muntenia
3. Elderberries
4. Stardust
5. Blue Of The Night
6. Der Heyser Bulgar
7. Bashraf Bulbul Al-Afrah
8. Yolande
9. White Christmas
10. One Little Crocodile
11. Kopanitsa
12. Planino/Erghen Diado
13. Stranger in Paradise
14. Moonglow/Picnic
15. Somewhere
16. Lobbydobby
- A Young Person's Guide (Released: 1 January 1996, Cat No: BDV 9612)
1. Mladeshki Dance (4:03)
2. Mercy, Mercy, Mercy (3:59)
3. Tsone Milo Chedo/Elena Mome (1:37)
4. Stars Fell on Alabama (4:38)
5. Under the Double Eagle (2:15)
6. Misturada/Sitna Lisa (5:50)
7. Lady L. (4:46)
8. Cozmek Elimde (5:08)
9. Kunywa Kidogo (2:02)
10. Cool Cats Victory (3:00)
11. Little Rock Getaway (2:10)
12. I Got it Bad (4:45)
13. Karsi R115 (2:30)
14. Como Podens (2:37)
15. M'Washah (3:38)
16. Tennessee Waltz (2:40)
17. Vengan Pollos (3:33)
18. Golden Slumbers (4:37)
- The Nightingale of a Thousand Joys (Released: 1 January 2000, Cat No: 514)
- Stay Cool (Released: 1 October 2005, Cat No: BDV 2557)
1. The Mooche (Duke Ellington)
2. Sunrise in Montreal (Rabih Abou-Khalil)
3. Goodnight Waltz (trad. American)
4. Jota De Porto (trad. Spanish)
5. Flower of Mexico (trad. American)
6. Gankino Horo (trad. Bulgarian)
7. Stay Cool (Victor Claiya)
8. Moliendo Café (Prado)
9. Alma Llanera (Gutierrez)
10. Longa Farfisa (Riyad al-Sinbati)
11. Bavno Pomashko (trad. Macedonia )
12. Melancholie (trad. French)
13. Una Noche Una Valse (trad. Venezuelan)
14. Appalachian Waltz (Sonia Slany)
15. Alabama Jubilee (Cobb/Yellen)
16. Golden Slumbers (Gay arr. Arguelles/Bates)
