= Buster B. Jones =

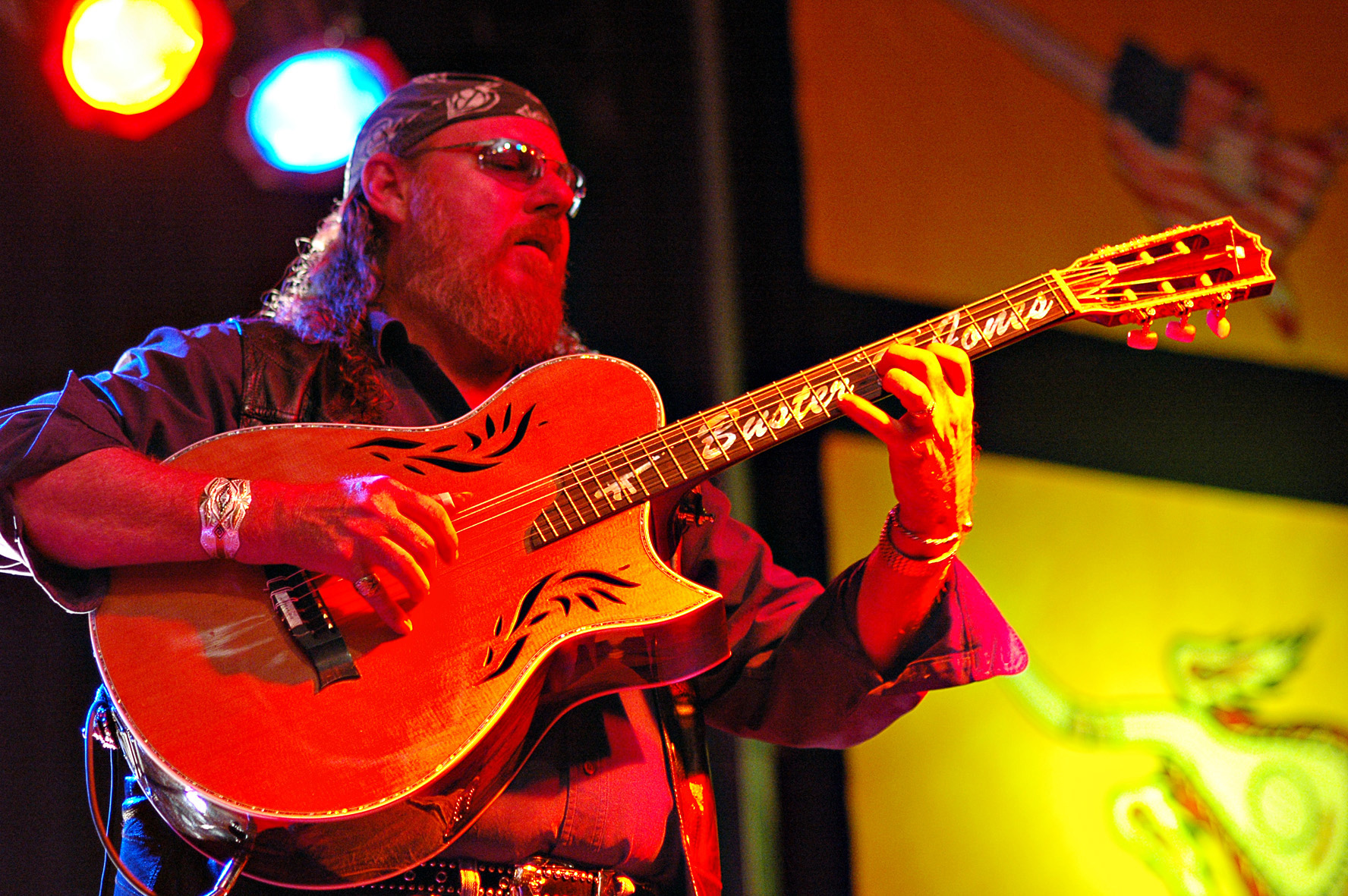
- Buster B. Jones in Rietberg/Germany in 2005

Background information
- Also known as: Buster B. Jones
- Born: Bradley F. Jones; August 24, 1959
- Origin: Ames, Iowa
- Died: February 2, 2009 (aged 49)
- Genres: Country
- Occupation: Guitarist Songwriter
- Instrument: Guitar
- Years active: 1988–2009
- Formerly of: Chet Atkins, Jerry Reed, Merle Travis, Thom Bresh

Buster B. Jones (August 24, 1959 – February 2, 2009) was an American guitarist specializing in the fingerpicking style.

== Biography ==
Born Bradley F. Jones in Ames, Iowa, on August 24, 1959, he is the son of Clarence Buster and Allene Whillour Jones and had three sisters and three brothers. He learned to play at a very young age, his talent coming from his parents and older brother, Ron. He graduated from Ames High School in 1978 and then served in the United States Air Force. He first became known after entering Guitar Player Magazine's International Reader's Soundpage Competition in 1988 on a whim. He submitted an original composition, titled Back Porch Boogie, as well as a cover of Salty Dog Blues, recorded using a reel-to-reel recorder and then transferred to cassette using a boombox. Jones came in first place out of nearly 900 entries. He went on to win the National Fingerpicking Championship at Winfield, Kansas in 1990. He formed a duo with his friend Thom Bresh, the son of Merle Travis.

In 1995, Jones became a spokesman for Godin guitars, playing a custom instrument he named "Pearl" for the mother of pearl inlay of his name on the neck. He toured often, earning the nicknames "Le Machine Gun" and "Pistola" for his fast playing style. That same style earned the notice of Chet Atkins, who described Buster by saying; "Buster B. Jones is the best fingerpicker I've heard since Jerry Reed... He plays like he's double parked."

Jones was well known for his mentoring of young players and he appeared in 11 instructional videos demonstrating and explaining fingerstyle guitar technique.

He toured all over the United States and Canada and overseas, in France - where he played guitar with Marcel Dadi -, Germany, England, Ireland, Italy, Australia, Japan and more.

He died on February 2, 2009, in Eugene, Oregon, from liver failure. He was survived by his companion Nancy Writer, and had two daughters, Jennifer and Jessica. He was first married to Cindy Jones Thomas.

== Discography ==
=== Albums ===
==== Solo ====
Year	Album	Label
1988	Back Porch Boogie	Flat Five Press & Recording Co., FFP-1103
1988	Stepping Out	Flat Five Press & Recording Co., FFP-1105
1991	Live at 'Five	Flat Five Press & Recording Co., FFP-1111
1998	Fingers in Flight	Recorded at Brian McConnal Studio, Quebec, Canada
2002	Just Us	Pazgunyak Music, PM040602
2005	A Decade of Buster B. Jones	compilation CD (?)

==== Duet ====
Year	Album	Label
2001	Guts & Steel: Goovemasters vol. 5: Thom Bresh & Buster B. Jones	Solid Air Records
2003	Ron's Point of View (featuring Buster's song Jessica Sue and two duos with Ron Wise: Conceived in Alaska & Fireweed)	Ron's Point of View

=== DVDs ===
Year	Name	Studio
1998 (VHS Tape), 2006 (DVD)	Buster B. Jones In Concert (with special guest Thom Bresh)	Homespun, Hal Leonard, HL00641399 (VHS Tape), HL00642001 (DVD)
1998 (VHS Tape), 2005 (DVD)	Thom Bresh In Concert (with special guest Buster B. Jones)	Homespun, Hal Leonard, HL00641893 (DVD)
	+14 instructional DVDs released by Stefan Grossman's Guitar Workshop	

=== Songbooks ===
Year	Name	Publisher
1999	Ballads and Barn Burners	Mel Bay Publication, Book & CD edition, MB98627BCD
2001	Remembering Marcel - 19 Fingerstyle Guitar Solos Celebrating the Life of Marcel Dadi (featuring one Buster's song Au revoir mon ami)	Mel Bay Publications, Book & CD edition, MB99759BCD
2009	Just Us - 14 Complete Notation and Tab Transcriptions	Mel Bay Publications, Book & CD edition, 20395M
