= Mummers Parade =

Parade held each New Year's Day in Philadelphia, Pennsylvania

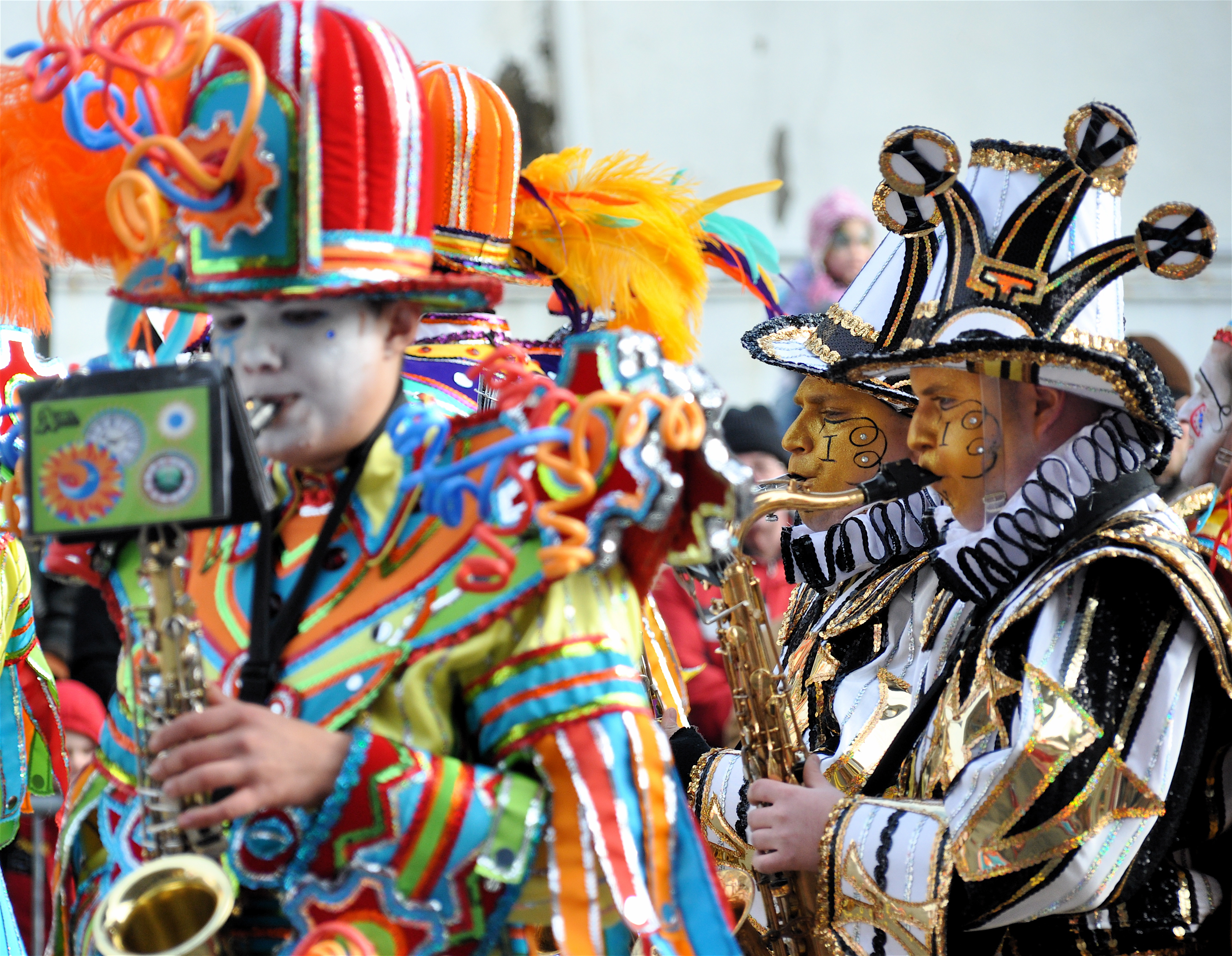
- A string band in the 2010 Mummers Parade
- Genre: Parade
- Date: New Year's Day
- Frequency: Annual
- Locations: Philadelphia, Pennsylvania
- Country: U.S.
- Years active: 126
- Inaugurated: January 1, 1901 (first official parade)
- Most recent: January 1, 2026

The Mummers Parade is held each New Year's Day in Philadelphia. It started in 1901, and is the longest-running continuous folk parade in the United States.

Local clubs, usually called "New Years Associations" or "New Years Brigades", compete in one of five categories: Comics, Wench Brigades, Fancies, String Bands, and Fancy Brigades. They prepare elaborate costumes, performance routines, and movable scenery, which take months to complete. This is done in clubhouses – many of which are on or near 2nd Street (called "Two Street" by some local residents) in the Pennsport neighborhood of the city's South Philadelphia section – which also serve as social gathering places for members.

Multiple Philadelphia television stations have aired the parade through its history; beginning in 2023, the latest of these is Wilmington, Delaware-licensed WDPN-TV, known as MeTV 2, which also provides live stream coverage through the website of its sister station WFMZ-TV in nearby Allentown, Pennsylvania. On several occasions, the parade has been nationally televised. In 1994 and again in 1995, it was televised by the Travel Channel. In 2009 and 2010, parts of the parade were televised nationally on WGN America and WGN-TV.

== History ==
=== 17th century ===
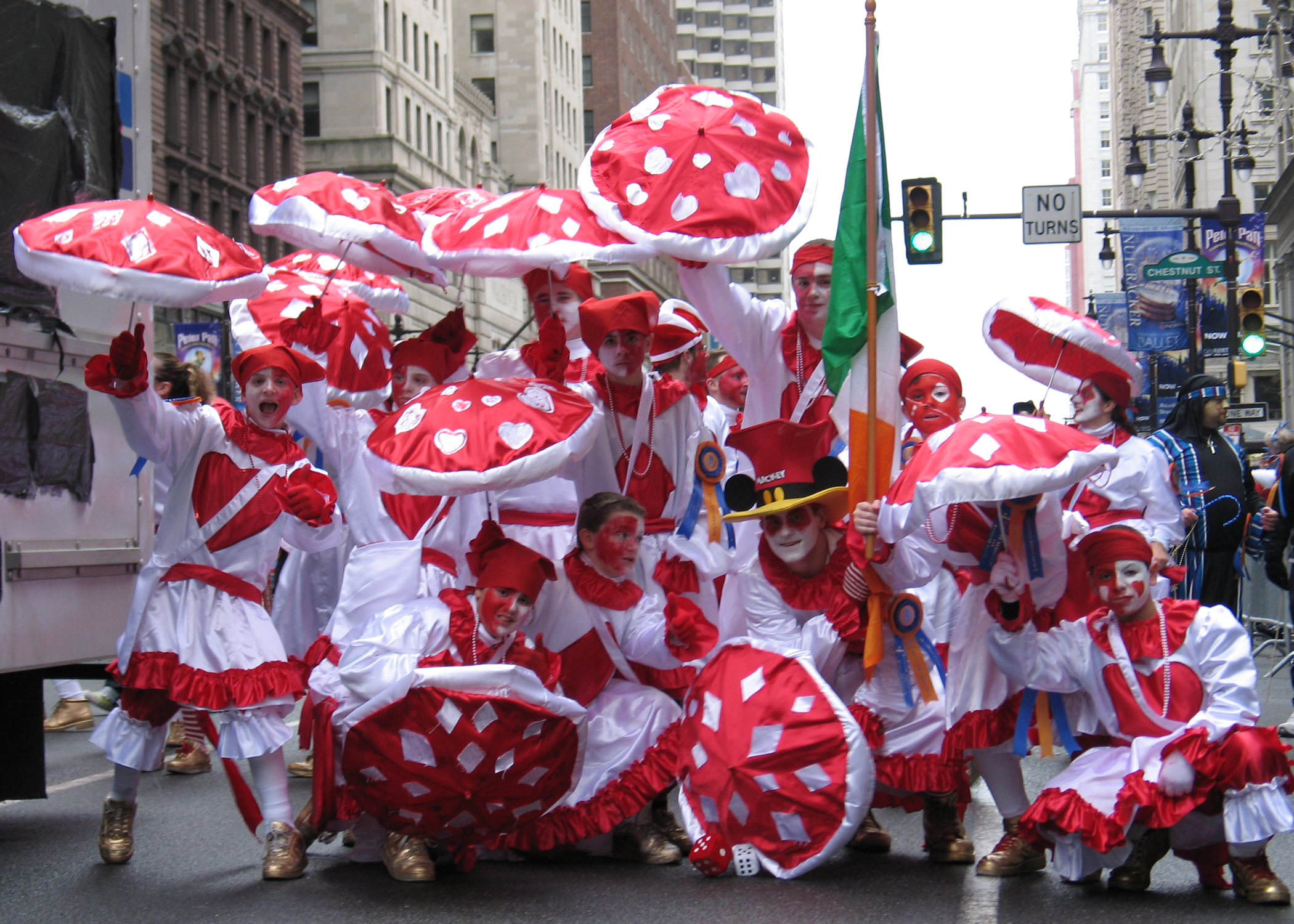
Members of the Holy Rollers N.Y.B. in the 2008 parade presenting their theme "Our Hearts are Wild for Diamonds"

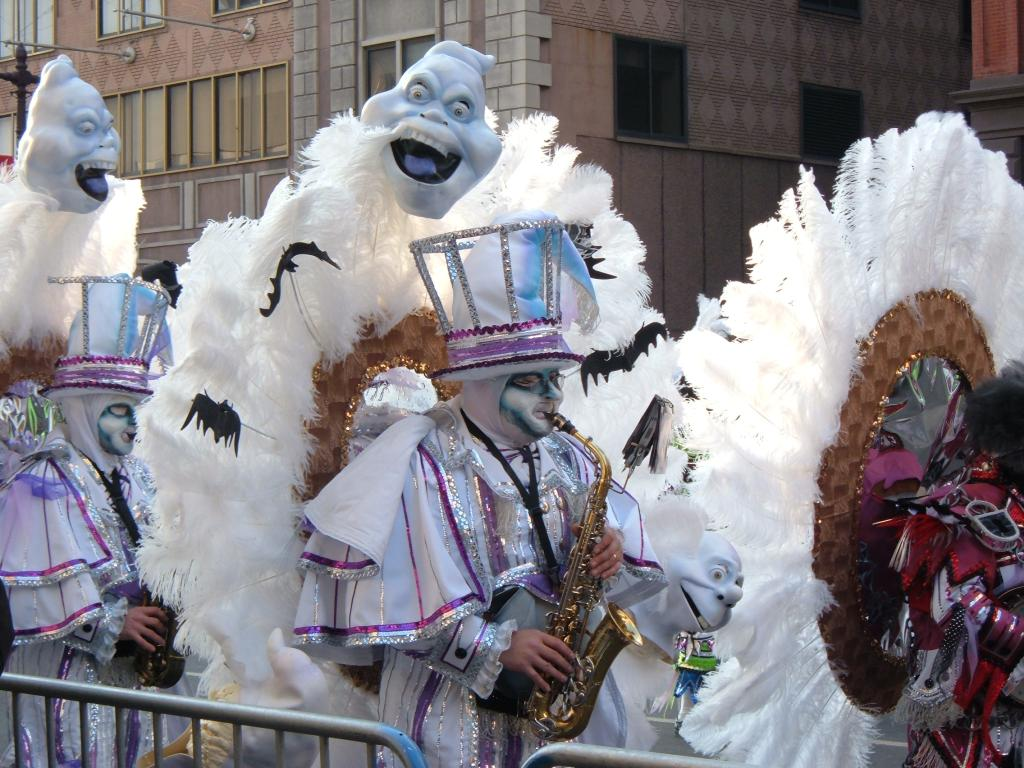
A few members of the Aqua String Band in the 2005 parade presenting their theme "Just Plain Dead"

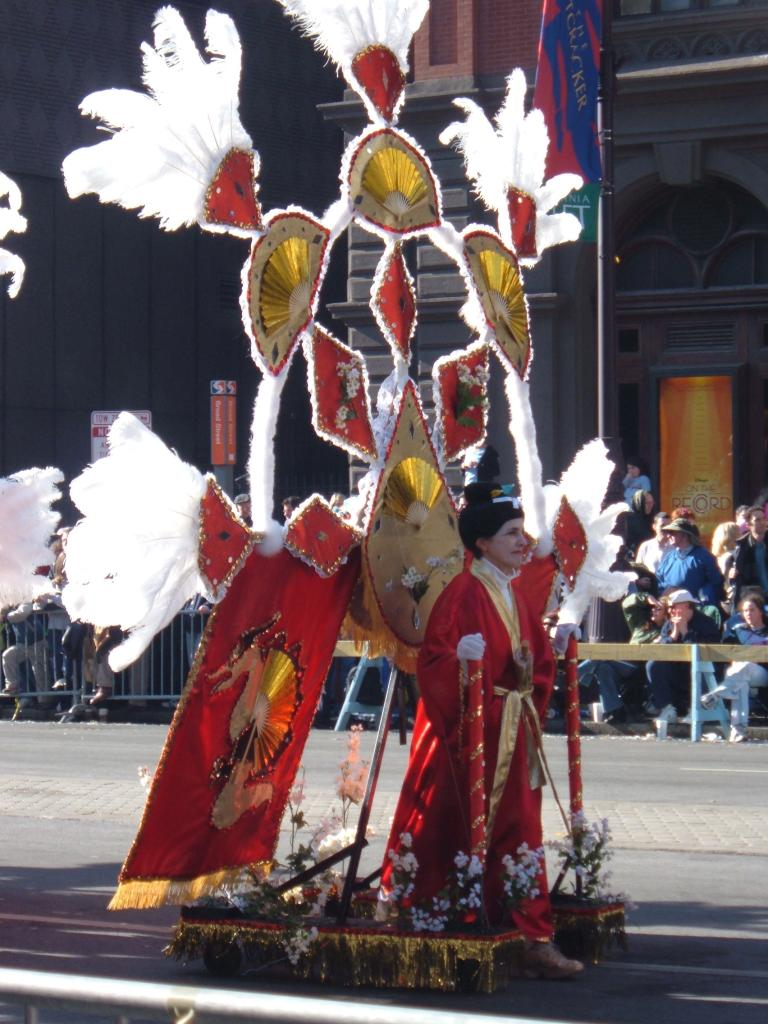
A "fancy" mummer in the 2005 parade

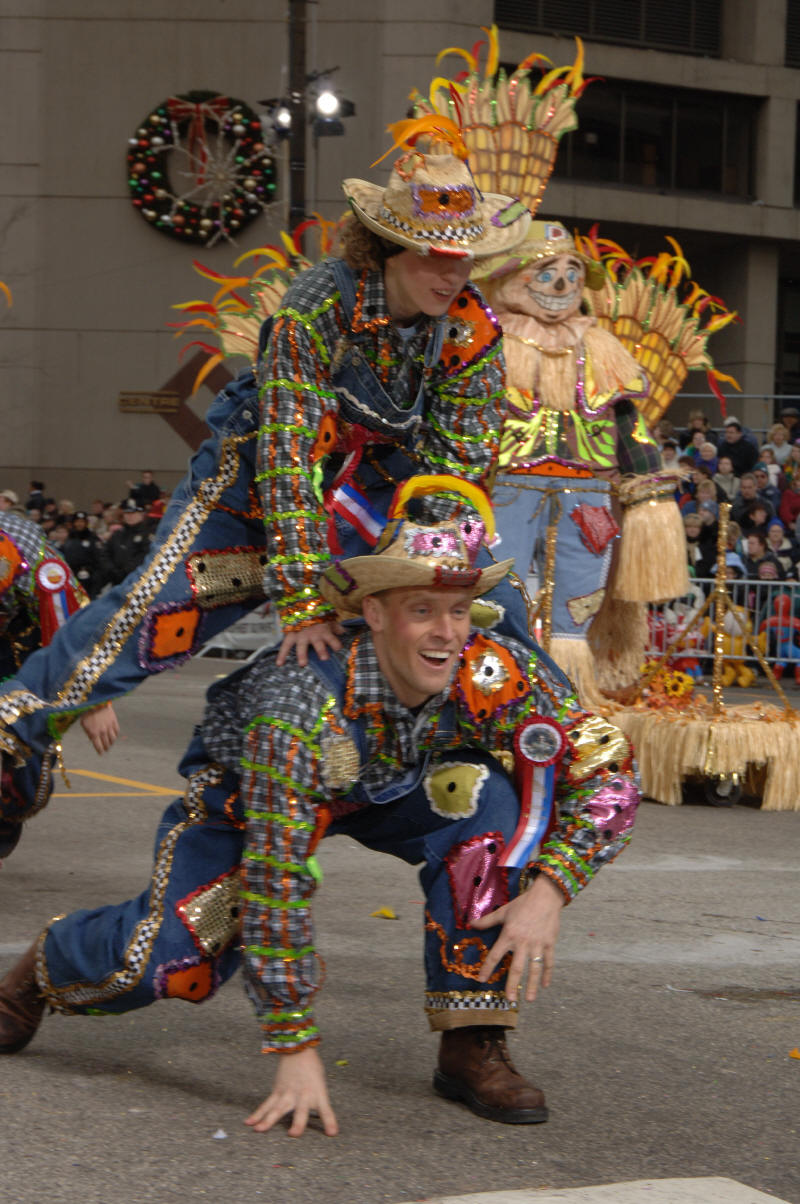
Golden Sunrise Fancy Club members participate in the 2007 parade

The parade traces back to mid-17th-century roots, blending elements from Swedish, Finnish, Irish, English, German, and other European heritages.

The parade is related to the Mummers Play tradition from Great Britain and Ireland. Revivals of this tradition are still celebrated annually in South Gloucestershire, England on Boxing Day along with other locations in England and in parts of Ireland on Saint Stephen's Day and also in the Canadian province of Newfoundland and Labrador around Christmas.

Swedes and Finns, early European colonists in the Philadelphia area, brought the custom of visiting neighbors on "Second Day Christmas" (December 26) with them to Tinicum. This was soon extended through New Year's Day with costumed celebrants loudly parading through the city. They appointed a "speech director", who performed a special dance with a traditional rhyme:

Here we stand before your door,
As we stood the year before;
Give us whiskey; give us gin,
Open the door and let us in.
Or give us something nice and hot
Like a steaming hot bowl of pepper pot!

=== 18th century ===
The Mummers derive their name from the Mummers' plays performed in Philadelphia in the 18th century as part of a wide variety of working class street celebrations around Christmas. By the early 19th century, these coalesced with earlier Swedish customs, including the Christmas neighbor visits and shooting firearms on New Year's Day (although this was common in other countries as well) as well as the Pennsylvania German custom of "belsnickling," where adults in disguise questioned children about their behavior during the previous year.

U.S. President George Washington carried on the official custom of New Year's Day calls during the seven years he occupied President's House in Philadelphia. The Mummers continued their traditions of comic verse in exchange for cakes and ale. Small groups of up to twenty mummers, their faces blackened, went door to door, shooting and shouting, and adapting the English Mummer's play by replacing the character of "King George" with that of "General Washington."

=== 19th century ===
Throughout the 19th century, large groups of disguised and sometimes blackfaced working class young men roamed the streets on New Year's Day, organizing processions, firing weapons into the air, demanding free drinks in taverns, and generally challenging middle and upper-class notions of order and decorum.

An 1808 law decreed that "masquerades" and "masquerade halls" were "common nuisances" and that anyone participating would be subject to a fine and imprisonment. It was apparently never successfully enforced and was repealed in 1859. Henry Muhlenberg, writing in 1839, reported, "Men met on the roads in Tinicum and Kingsessing, who were disguised as clowns, shouting at the top of their voices and shooting guns.

By the 1880s, unable to suppress the custom, the Philadelphia city government began to pursue a policy of co-option, requiring participants to join organized groups with designated leaders who had to apply for permits and were responsible for their groups’ actions. The earliest documented club, the Chain Gang, had formed in 1840 and Golden Crown first marched in 1876 with cross-town rivals Silver Crown forming soon after. By 1881, a local report said "Parties of paraders" made the street "almost like a masked Ball." By 1900, these groups formed part of an organized, city-sanctioned parade with cash prizes for the best performances.

Southern plantation life's contributions include the parade's theme song, James A. Bland's "Oh, Dem Golden Slippers" (introduced in 1903), as well as the 19th-century cakewalk, dubbed the "Mummers' Strut" or the "2 Street Strut".

=== 20th century ===
The first official parade was held January 1, 1901. The first string band, Trilby, was organized in 1898, first paraded in 1902, and last paraded in 2016 after not marching in the previous parade (Trilby however agreed to help out with the parade by marshaling with members being dispersed to help with other bands in the String Band Association). In the early years of the official parade, the makeshift costumes of most celebrants were gradually replaced by more elaborate outfits funded by associations' fund-raising efforts.

The official parade has been cancelled only thrice during its history. One happened in 1919 as a result of the Spanish Flu epidemic when many public events were cancelled; another occurred in 1934 due to the effects of the Great Depression and a lack of prize money; and 2021 on grounds of the COVID-19 pandemic.

As they assimilated to Philadelphia, many immigrant groups have joined the tradition. Numerous Irish immigrants and Irish-Americans from South Philadelphia became involved in the Mummers Parade as both Mummers performers and parade goers. Other ethnic groups were soon integrated into the parade through the years. Italian-Americans and Italian immigrants to South Philadelphia began to participate in the Mummers Parade in large numbers after World War II. While South Philadelphia (especially Pennsport) remains one of the most important centers for Mummers traditions and Mummers members, more recent immigrants to the neighborhood from Asia and Latin America generally have fewer ties to the parade and tradition.

While almost all parade participants are currently white, African American mummers existed in the past. The all African American Golden Eagle Club, formed in 1866, had 300 members in the 1906 parade, for example. Judges systematically discriminated against black clubs, however, and the last, the Octavius Catto Club, withdrew after receiving last place in the 1929 parade. The brass bands hired to accompany the Comic Brigades often include black musicians, but do not dress in costume and consider themselves session musicians rather than Mummers. By 1964, only one African American mummer, Willis Fluelling, remained. As of 2007, a few of the less traditional clubs, such as Spiral Q Puppet Theater's West Philadelphia Mummers Brigade, were integrated.

The comic "wenches" and other female roles in most skits are typically performed by men in drag. Women were not officially allowed in the parade until the 1970s.

The South Philly Vikings ran Viking Hall in the 1980s and 1990s, the venue today known as 2300 Arena.

=== 21st century ===
As of 2008, the parade cost the city over $1 million each year, including $750,000 for police and parade services and $360,000 in prize money. The 2008 budget crisis led the city to propose closing numerous libraries and firehouses and the scaling back of expenditures for the parade, offering $300,000 for the 2009 parade and nothing for 2010.

After the end of city funding for the parade, the Mummers created the "Save the Mummers Fund" to help cover the additional city fees to paying expenses for police and sanitation services during the event.

Funding for the parade during the first decade of the 2000s was provided for several years by Southwest Airlines, which also took naming rights of the parade, which was called "Southwest Airlines Mummers Parade." Funding for the 2012 parade was provided by SugarHouse Casino, which renamed the parade to "Sugar House Mummers Parade."

In September 2009, The Bacon Brothers musical duo, composed of Philadelphia natives Michael and Kevin Bacon, recorded a special version of their song "New Year's Day" with members of the All-Star String Band. Proceeds from the sale of the CD went to the Save the Mummers Fund. Additionally, the duo performed a benefit concert for the parade in December 2009.

== Location, time, and route ==
The parade traveled northward on Broad Street in Philadelphia for decades until the 1995 parade when the parade was moved to Market Street due to construction work on Broad Street at the Avenue of the Arts between Washington Avenue and Philadelphia City Hall. After construction was completed, the parade returned to Broad Street from 1996 to 1999. For various reasons, the parade was moved again to Market Street in 2000. In 2004, the parade was moved back to Broad Street temporarily. In 1997, the Fancy Brigades were moved to the Pennsylvania Convention Center, allowing for larger sets, but limiting audience size. In 2011, the Fancy Brigades returned to the parade temporarily.

Each year, thousands of people participate in the parade, many wearing elaborate costumes costing tens of thousands of dollars to make and weighing well over 100 pounds. At one time up to $395,000 in prizes was awarded to the various winners. But as of 2010, there are no longer any monetary awards for the performers. The costs for making the outfits plus fees to choreographers and prop designers often far exceed the prizes available. While club fund-raisers, hall rentals, and bank loans often cover much of the expense, individual members frequently spend hundreds or thousands of dollars of their own money. To raise funds, many string bands and their members seek paying gigs, particularly in area Fourth of July parades, the annual "Show of Shows" formerly held in Atlantic City each winter, weddings, and other events. Many clubs hold "beef and beers" or 50/50 raffles. Most charge annual dues for membership.

As of 2008, the parade began at 9:00 am and ended sometime before 8:00 pm. Fancy brigades performed at the nearby convention center at noon, and in a second, judged show at 5:00 pm. An individual Mummers' strut – a weaving, comical dance/walk with pumping arms held out to the side – may last two or three hours from South Philadelphia to City Hall. The whole parade, at close to eleven hours, may have been the longest parade in the U.S. Due to budget cuts, the 2009 parade was shorter, scheduled to begin at 10:00 am and last six and a half hours.

Incidents of foul weather have delayed the parade on occasions by several hours, including 2008.

On January 1, 2015, the Mummers began their parade route at Philadelphia's City Hall and headed south along Broad Street to Washington Avenue. The Mummers used the Benjamin Franklin Parkway as a staging area prior to moving to City Hall to be judged. After the judging, the mummers joined the parade heading south on Broad St. The parade ended at Washington Ave, with some clubs still heading east to Second Street for the unofficial "Two Street Parade".

If an all-day postponement is required for foul weather, the parade is usually held the following Saturday (or Sunday, if Saturday is inclement), as the expensive and fancy costumes are easily harmed by precipitation or high winds.

Each year, there is a festival leading up to the parade called MummersFest. It allows fans to tour the Pennsylvania Convention Center to watch the Fancy Brigades build their props and practice for their New Year's Day reveal.

== Divisions ==
=== Comics ===
Comics are clowns, many of them well-liquored, in colorful outfits, often with multi-level umbrellas who dance to recordings such as "Golden Slippers". The comics typically start the parade. Themes often gently parody current events and traditional life. Prizes are awarded for floats, groups, brigades, couples, original costume, original character, and juvenile.

The comic clubs are:

- Goodtimers
- Landi
- Rich Porco's Murray Comic Club

=== Wench brigades ===
Wench brigades, an offshoot of comics, pride themselves on continuing traditions such as the dress-and-bloomers "suits", painted faces, decorated umbrellas, and live brass bands to accompany the brigade. As of 2024, 10 brigades form part of the parade.

Wench brigades include:

- Bryson
- Cara Liom
- Froggy Carr
- O'Malley
- Oregon
- Pirates
- Riverfront
- Saints
- Americans

=== Fancies ===
The fancy division is made up of one mother club:

- Golden Sunrise

Members with some small floats strut in elaborate costumes to music provided by a live band. Prizes are awarded to individuals, trios, juveniles and captains.

=== String bands ===
String bands provide elaborate performances. Limited to unamplified strings, reeds, and percussion, string bands feature banjos, saxophones (alto, tenor, baritone and bass), accordions, double basses, drums, glockenspiels and occasionally violins in musical arrangements tied to a theme presented by the captain, beautiful costumes and props (some people call them floats). Historically, string bands performed mostly in military-drill formations. Harrowgate (now Uptown) String Band's first-prize-winning railroad tunes with Broadway-style dance in 1976 changed that. String-band performances are now the most elaborate of the parade, outdone only by the fancy brigades indoor performances. These bands come from all over Philadelphia and the surrounding areas. With the move of the Fancy Brigades to become indoor theatrical presentations, the band displays today constitute the finale of the morning parade.

The participant string bands include the following:

- Aqua
- Avalon
- Jersey String Band
- Duffy
- Durning
- Ferko
- Fralinger
- Greater Kensington
- Hegeman
- Polish American
- Quaker City
- South Philadelphia
- Uptown
- Woodland

=== Fancy brigades ===
The largest category with the largest crews, the fancy brigades march the southernmost portion of the parade route, before heading to the convention center for a ticketed show and judging. Until the late 1970s, the fancy brigades were simply larger presentations within the Fancies. As the props grew larger, more cumbersome and more vulnerable to wind, rain and snow, the decision was made to move the Brigades indoors, making them a separate event away from the parade providing the finale to a day of citywide celebrations. These brigades have two shows slated in the center, with the late afternoon show, with the judges present for the scoring of the performances, being televised live.

Fancy brigades include:

- Avenuers
- Clevemore
- Downtowners
- Golden Crown
- Jokers
- Satin Slipper
- Saturnalian
- Spartans
- Shooting Stars
- South Philly Vikings

== 2nd Street ==
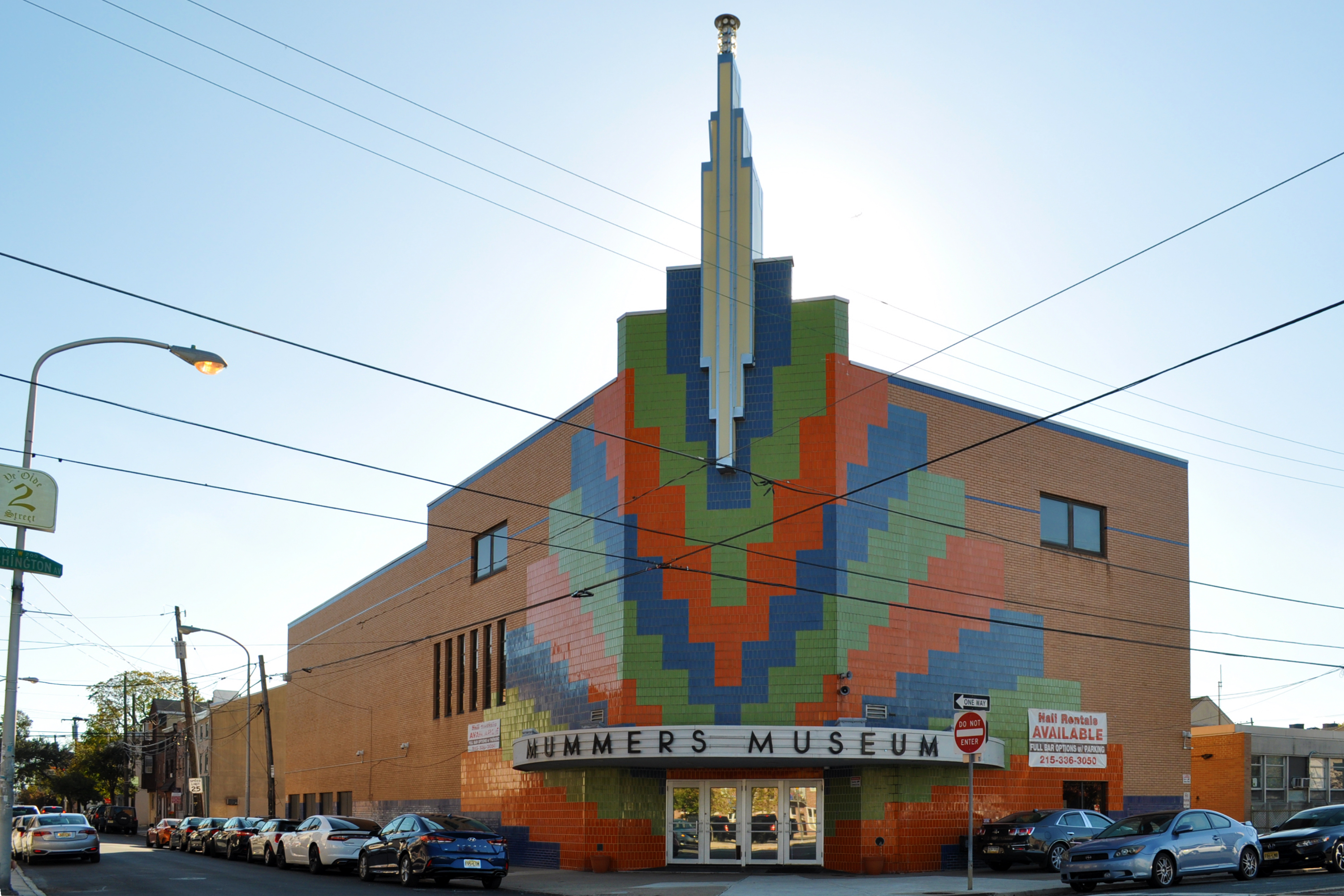
The Philadelphia Mummers Museum at 2nd Street and Washington Avenue

Because of the large number of clubhouses there, South 2nd Street (Two Street) often serves as a party location after the parade, with the center of activity being South 2nd Street and Mifflin Street. Local residents and others in the area for the parade crowd the local bars, clubhouses and sidewalks, sometimes joining in the unofficial parade. With the parade they spent months preparing for finished, the Mummers let loose and celebrate. This multi-block party continues well into the night or early morning, with some Mummers not sleeping for twenty-four hours straight.

In 2009, the city declined to pay for any post-parade celebrations on Two Street. However, Rep. Bob Brady helped secure funding for the event in the final hours.

== Controversy ==
The parade has been accused of including hate speech, racist, sexist, anti-LGBT, and culturally insensitive costumes, makeup, and images.

The wearing of blackface carried over from minstrel shows in the early 20th century. Growing dissent from civil-rights groups and the objections of the black community led to most clubs phasing out blackface in the early 1960s.

In 1963, one week before the parade, concerned about their image for a nationwide broadcast, the Mummers banned blackface for the parade. Angry Mummers picketed the parade magistrate's home, leading to a reversal of the decision. Concerned about a possible riot, the city called in extra police for the parade. A 1964 city policy officially banned blackface, but some groups have continued to wear blackface into the 21st century over growing protests. However, as of 2017, the use of blackface is extremely uncommon amongst the parade.

In 1985, the South Philadelphia String Band petitioned to use blackface and was denied.

In 1987, Philadelphia mayor Wilson Goode had Mummers photos removed from City Hall because the Mummers appeared to be wearing blackface. Saying the Mummers were not in blackface, a petition resulted in the photos being restored, though not near the mayor's office.

In 1996, half of the string bands reported having female members. The bands' captains, though, made it clear to reporters that they did not want to let women in the bands, but felt they had to, due to declining membership.

In 2003, word spread that Slick Duck Comic Brigade was working on a skit involving priests chasing altar boys. Protests from the Archdiocese of Philadelphia, the Diocese of Camden and the Catholic League, and WPHL-TV announcing they would not air the skit led to the group's cancelling of the skit and claiming it was just a prank.

Goodtimers Comic Brigade's 2003 entry highlighted the Mummers' continued use of blackface, skirting of the rules with brown, red, purple and blue makeup and strong references to minstrel shows. Mummers have declared the alternate color choices as a direct protest of the longstanding and frequently flouted ban. The Goodtimers' stand in for Al Jolson wore dark blue makeup with kinky hair, backed by "a minstrel in blackface on a large poster with 'Gone Yes — Forgotten Never'".

In 2009, B. Love Strutters Brigade referenced the charges of discrimination filed against Joey Vento of Geno's Steaks in the city's Commission on Human Relations. In the skit, "Aliens of an Illegal Kind", Arabs had long beards and turbans, Mexicans wore sombreros, and Asian women were depicted as geishas", The Philadelphia Inquirer reported.

In 2013, The Ferko String Band offered "Ferko's Bringing Back the Minstrel Days".

In 2013, Venetian NYA club presented "Indi-sourcing", showing a call center with members dressed as Indians being raided by members dressed as Native Americans and moving the call center to New Jersey.

The 2015 parade again featured blackface, along with a satire of the Black Lives Matter titled "Wench Lives Matter".

In 2016, a group presented a Mexican-themed skit, with all of the performers wearing brownface. Parodies of Black Lives Matter continued.

The same year, Finnegan New Years Brigade performed a Caitlyn Jenner skit showing her pre-transition on the cover of Wheaties box and after transitioning on the cover of a Froot Loops box. A male Mummer, dressed as Jenner, appeared, mocking her Vanity Fair cover announcing she was transgender. News reports showed a Mummer with the Wheaties/Froot Loops sign screaming "fuck the gays!" Social media posts led to two of the Mummers being fired from their day-to-day jobs and ousted from the club.

In 2020, two Mummers were banned from future parades after wearing blackface. In response, Mayor Jim Kenney (himself from South Philadelphia and a former participant in the parade) said the city would end the parade "if Mummers leadership does not make immediate changes to better control the parade". City Councilmember Cindy Bass introduced a bill that Mummers who wore blackface risk a $75 fine and a five-year banishment.

== Broadcast ==
During the 1980s and early 1990s, the parade was broadcast on local TV on KYW, switching to PHL17 in 1995. From 1993 to 1995 the parade was broadcast nationally on The Travel Channel and on WGN in 2009 and 2010.

In 2026, the parade was broadcast on WFMZ.

== See also ==
- Culture of Philadelphia
- List of holiday parades
- Mummering
