= Cleve Chaffin =

American musician (1885–1959)

Cleve Chafin (March 4, 1885 – December 10, 1959) was a carnival musician who recorded old-time music during the 1920s.

== Biography ==
Chafin was from Wayne County, West Virginia, the son of Alice Adkins and Bob Chafin. He first recorded a solo session in Richmond, Indiana, for Gennett Records on November 16, 1927, but the recordings were never issued. He may also have recorded a session for Paramount Records in 1928 with two men named Stevens and Bolar as Fruit Jar Guzzlers. In Chicago, Illinois, Chaffin recorded six songs with John & Emery McClung for Paramount Records. These records were released as by Cleve Chaffin and The McClung Brothers. Chaffin continued his professional music career, but never recorded again. He died on December 10, 1959, in Huntington, West Virginia, at the age of 74.

Chafin died in Huntington, West Virginia, at the age of 74. He was never married.

According to the Thirteenth Census of the United States in 1910, a Cleve Chafin, who was born in Kentucky and aged 22, was a prisoner at the city jail in Cabell County, West Virginia at the time of the census.

== Discography ==
=== Unreleased 1927 Gennett recordings ===
- Sweet Bunch of Daisies
- Aged Mother
- The Night My Mother Died
- Curtain Of Night
- Wreck Of The C&O
- Railroad Bill

=== Cleve Chaffin & The McClung Brothers ===
- Babylon Is Falling Down/I Got A Home In The Beulah Land (Paramount #3160) (3/1929)
- Trail Blazer's Favorites/Alabama Jubilee (Paramount #3161) (3/1929)
- Rock House Gamblers/Curtains Of Night (Paramount #3170) (3/1929)

== Various artists compilations ==
- My Rough And Rowdy Ways Volume One (Yazoo #2039) (1998)
- Old Time Music Of West Virginia Volume Two (County #CD-3519) (1999)
- The Half Ain’t Never Been Told Volume Two (Yazoo #2050) (1999)
- Country Music Classic (Vintage78 #C-53) (cassette)
- Paramount Old Time Recordings (JSP) (3-CD set) (2006)
