= Aqua String Band =

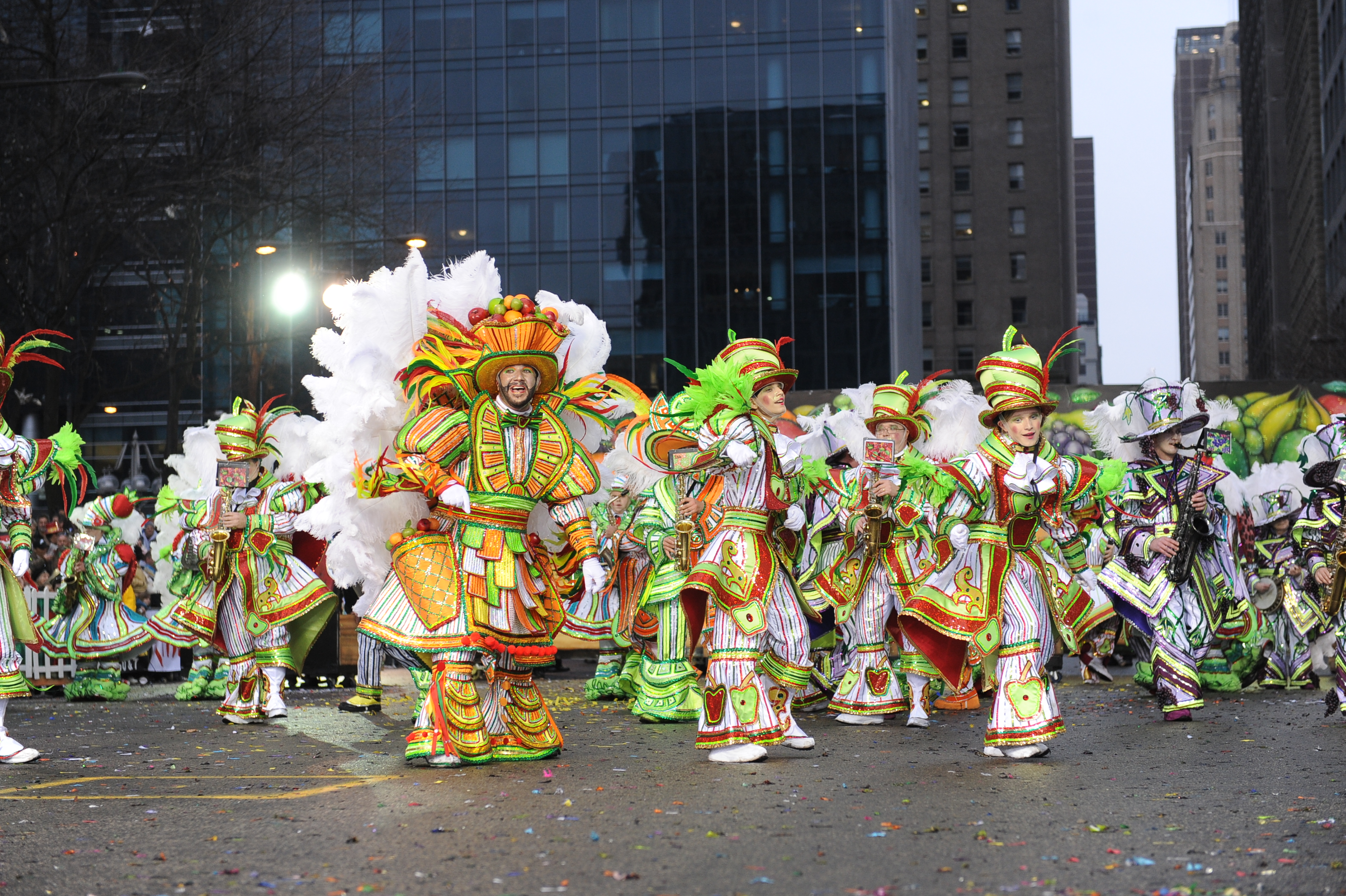
Aqua String Band's 2011 Performance - "Aqua Has A-Peel!"

The Aqua String Band is an all-volunteer string band, best known for its participation in Philadelphia's annual Mummers Parade.

The band was founded in 1920, and participated in its first Mummers Parade on New Year's Day in 1921.

By 1949, this ensemble was the largest string band to make an appearance in Philadelphia's Mummers' Day Parade.

== History ==
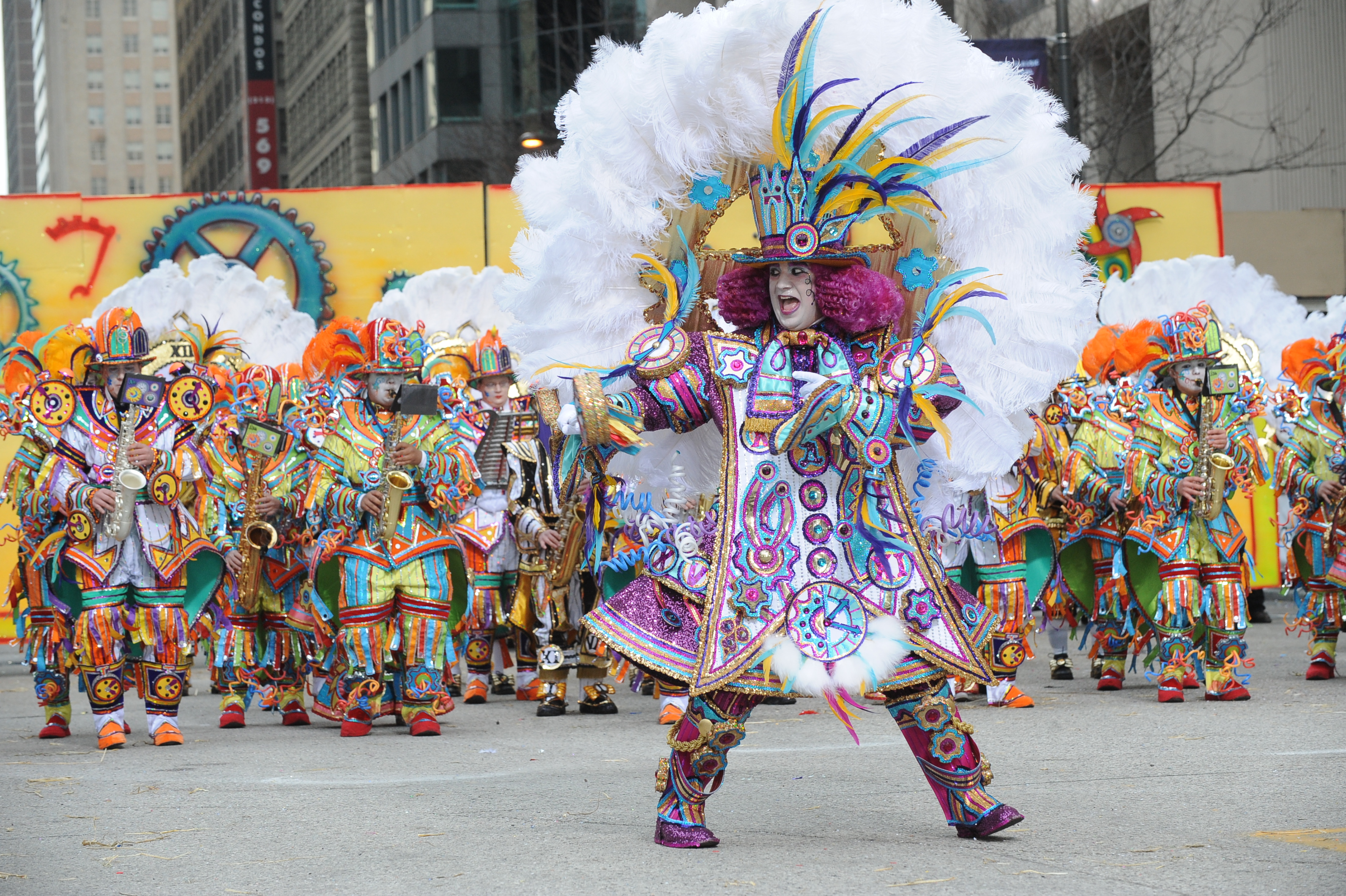
Aqua String Band's 2010 Performance - "It's About Time!"

The band was organized on April 2, 1920, by Elmer W. Leyrer and Fred J. Kesel Sr., and was incorporated into the String Band Association in 1945. Kesel introduced the glockenspiel to string bands, which has now become a signature and defining sound. The name, "Aqua", poked fun at the Volstead Act which banned alcohol under Prohibition.

In addition to Philadelphia area parades, private events and concerts, the group participated in the city of Hazleton's 1949 Mummers' Day Parade, the 2012 St. Patrick's Day Parade in Holyoke, Massachusetts, the 2012 Little League World Series' Grand Slam Parade, and the 2011 Hatboro Holiday Parade.

In 1987, the group was attempting to purchase Germania Mannerchor clubhouse for their home base.
