= Fruit Jar Guzzlers =

1920s music group

Fruit Jar Guzzlers was an old-time music group who recorded during the 1920s.

== Biography ==
Fruit Jar Guzzlers is one of the most mysterious old-time groups to ever record. In 1928, another old-time musician Cleve Chaffin from Wayne County, West Virginia had supposedly recorded a session with two men named Stevens and Bolar for Paramount Records as Fruit Jar Guzzlers. The names Stevens and Bolar appear as the writers for most of these recordings. The group recorded many sides for Paramount in 1928. Chaffin is said to have played on all the recordings the group made. Other records by the Fruit Jar Guzzlers were released on Paramount's subsidiary label, Broadway Records, some were released as by the Panhandle Boys. It is possible that the Fruit Jar Guzzlers may also come from Wayne County, West Virginia, where Chaffin was from.

== Recordings ==
- Stack-O-Lee/Steel Driving Man (John Henry) (Paramount #3121) (1928)
- Steel Driving Man (John Henry) (Broadway #8199) (1928)
- Wild Horse (1928)
- The Black Sheep Of The Family (1928)
- Yes I’m Free At Last (1928)
- Old Joe Clark (1928)
- Cripple Creek (1928)
- Cool Penitentiary (1928)
- Sourwood Mountain (1928)
- Pity The Tramp (1928)
- Fox In The Mountains (1928)
- C & O Whistle (1928)
- Cacklin’ Hen (1928)
- Kentucky Bootlegger (1928)

== Various artists compilations ==
- My Rough And Rowdy Ways Volume One (Yazoo #2039) (1998)
- Old Time Music Of West Virginia Volume One (County #CD-3518) (1999)
- Old Time Music Of West Virginia Volume Two (County #CD-3519) (1999)
- Old Country Gospel (Vintage78 #C-11) (cassette)
- Paramount Old Time Recordings (JSP) (3-CD set) (2006)
