= Paul Clarvis =

English percussionist

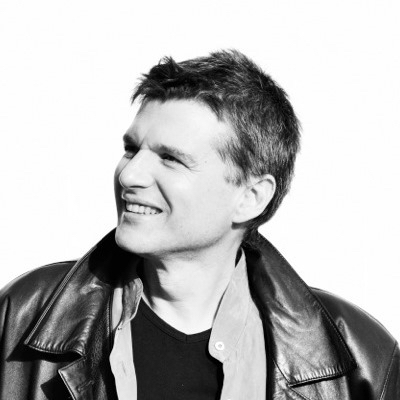
- Clarvis in 2015
- Born: 9 April 1963 (age 63); Enfield, London
- Occupation: percussionist

Paul Clarvis (born 9 April 1963) is an English percussionist.

== Biography ==
Born in Enfield, Clarvis was the late Leonard Bernstein's preferred percussionist in London and featured as a soloist on the last night of the Proms in 1996 in a concerto for saxophone and drum kit by Sir Harrison Birtwhistle. In 1998 he was chairman of the Percussion judges for the BBC Young Musician of the Year and together with Sonia Slany he started Villagelife Records.

Clarvis also helped Rick Smith with the drum arrangement for the London Olympics 2012 opening, writing Dame Evelyn Glennie's part and together with Smith, assisted in the training of the ceremony's 1000 drummers.

== Bands ==
Clarvis has worked with a number of notable musicians: Mick Jagger, Nina Simone, Stevie Wonder, Steve Swallow, Sir Harrison Birtwistle, Sir John Dankworth to Sir Paul McCartney, John Taylor and Moondog, Gordon Beck, Bryan Ferry and Elton John. He has recorded with Marc Ribot, Sam Rivers, Richard Thompson, The Orb, John Adams, Michael Nyman, Loreena McKennitt, Mark Anthony Turnage and Michel Legrand as well as his own band Orquestra Mahatma.

He regularly holds gigs with Mose Allison and has also played with Nina Simone, Herbie Hancock and Ravi Shankar.

== Film ==
Clarvis has contributed to a number of films:

- Star Wars
- Harry Potter
- The Chronicles of Narnia
- Twilight films
- The Dark Knight
- Constant Gardner
- The Bourne Ultimatum,
- Burn After Reading
- Shakespeare in Love
- Fantastic Mr Fox
- Billy Elliot
- James Bond
- Robin Hood
- G.I. Jane
- Notting Hill
- Tron
- The Mummy
- The Golden Compass
- Bee Movie
- Troy
- State of Play
- The Road
- The Last King of Scotland
- Spy Game
- Elizabeth: The Golden Age
- The Escapist
- Thunderbirds
- V for Vendetta
- The Passion
- King Arthur
- Dorian Gray
- Kingdom of Heaven
- Around the World in 80 Days
- Alien vs. Predator
- Madagascar
- On a Clear Day
- Captain Corelli's Mandolin
- Captain America
- Shrek
- Hugo Cabret
- Kung Fu Panda
- Lord of the Rings
- Prometheus
- the Hobbit
- The Great Gatsby
- Ten Minutes Older

Clarvis had also worked on; Quills (band member: The Quills Specialist Band), The Cell (first percussion), The Miracle Maker (ethnic percussion), The Next Best Thing (percussion), The Darkest Light (percussion), Beautiful People (percussion), East Is East (drums and percussion), Heart (percussion), Beloved (featured musician), The Mighty (percussion), My Son the Fanatic (musician) and many more.
