= String band =

Old-time music or jazz ensemble

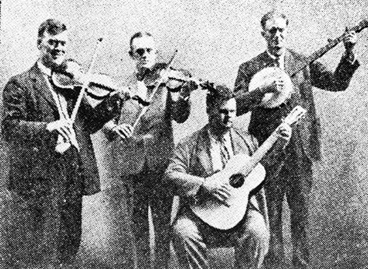
The string band Gid Tanner and his Skillet Lickers

A string band is an old-time music or jazz ensemble made up mainly or solely of string instruments. String bands were popular in the 1920s and 1930s, and are among the forerunners of modern country music and bluegrass. While being active countrywide, in Philadelphia and its surrounding suburbs they are a huge part of its musical culture and traditions, appearing, among others, in the yearly Mummers Parade.

== History of African American old-time string band music ==
Although African American old-time string bands recorded history is that of the early 20th century, the beginnings of the music started much earlier. Many people once believed that the role African Americans played in the upcoming of old-time string band music was either nonexistent or to interest the Middle Ages or medieval times. The genre of African American folk music actually began with the use of percussion instruments, which were used to create music in form of encouragement to keep the slaves exercising on slave ships. Furthermore, that then sparked the usage of stringed instruments such as banjos and violins that the slaves played as a way of entertainment.

== Instruments in an old-time string band ==
Old-time string bands were mainly composed of stringed instruments. Those instruments being the fiddle, 5-string banjo, acoustic guitar, and an upright bass/cello. Depending on the type of genre the old-time music is being accompanied by, the stringed instruments may also be joined by other instruments including spoons, washboards, jugs, harmonica, harps and pianos.

== String bands in old-time music ==
During the 19th and early 20th centuries, other stringed instruments began to be added to the fiddle-banjo duo that was essential to dance music of the early 19th century United States. These other instruments included the guitar, mandolin, and double bass (or washtub bass), which provided chordal and bass line accompaniment (or occasionally melody also). Such an assemblage, of whatever instrumentation, became known simply as a "string band."

In the 1870s African-American dance houses of Cincinnati had musicians who played violin, banjo, and bass fiddle. East of the Mississippi, the genre gave way to country music in the 1930s and bluegrass music in the 1940s. During the same period, west of the Mississippi, Western musicians retained the acoustic style of the bands while the big Western dance bands amplified their strings.

== String bands in jazz ==
Artists began to combine and record string-band music in collaboration with other popular styles in the 1920s. Lonnie Johnson and his brother, James “Steady Roll” Johnson were both proficient at banjo, guitar, and violin, and recorded with various string bands in a blues style. Lonnie Johnson also recorded duets with Eddie Lang during the late 1920s and set the precedent for string band jazz, which included Bull Frog Moan/A Handful of Riffs from 1929. As influential as the Johnson/Lang duets were those by Lang and Joe Venuti. These works, completed in 1926, emphasized the rhythm of a chordal guitar with the melody in the swung violin line.

Red McKenzie, who also recorded with Lang, recorded with an influential string band group during the 1930s, the Spirits of Rhythm. The group consisted of tiple, guitar, homemade percussion, double bass, and often involved scat singing. The particular form of scat that was eventually associated with string band music was based on Harlem slang, and can be heard in McKenzie's recording My Old Man, from 1933. Another string band from the 1930s, Slim and Slam, continued this particular form of scat in their recording The Flat Foot Floogie. Strings in jazz continued with the standout duet album, "Blues and Ballads," recorded in 1960 with Lonnie Johnson and guitarist Elmer Snowden, a renowned banjoist/guitarist from the 1920s.
