= Mike Auldridge discography =

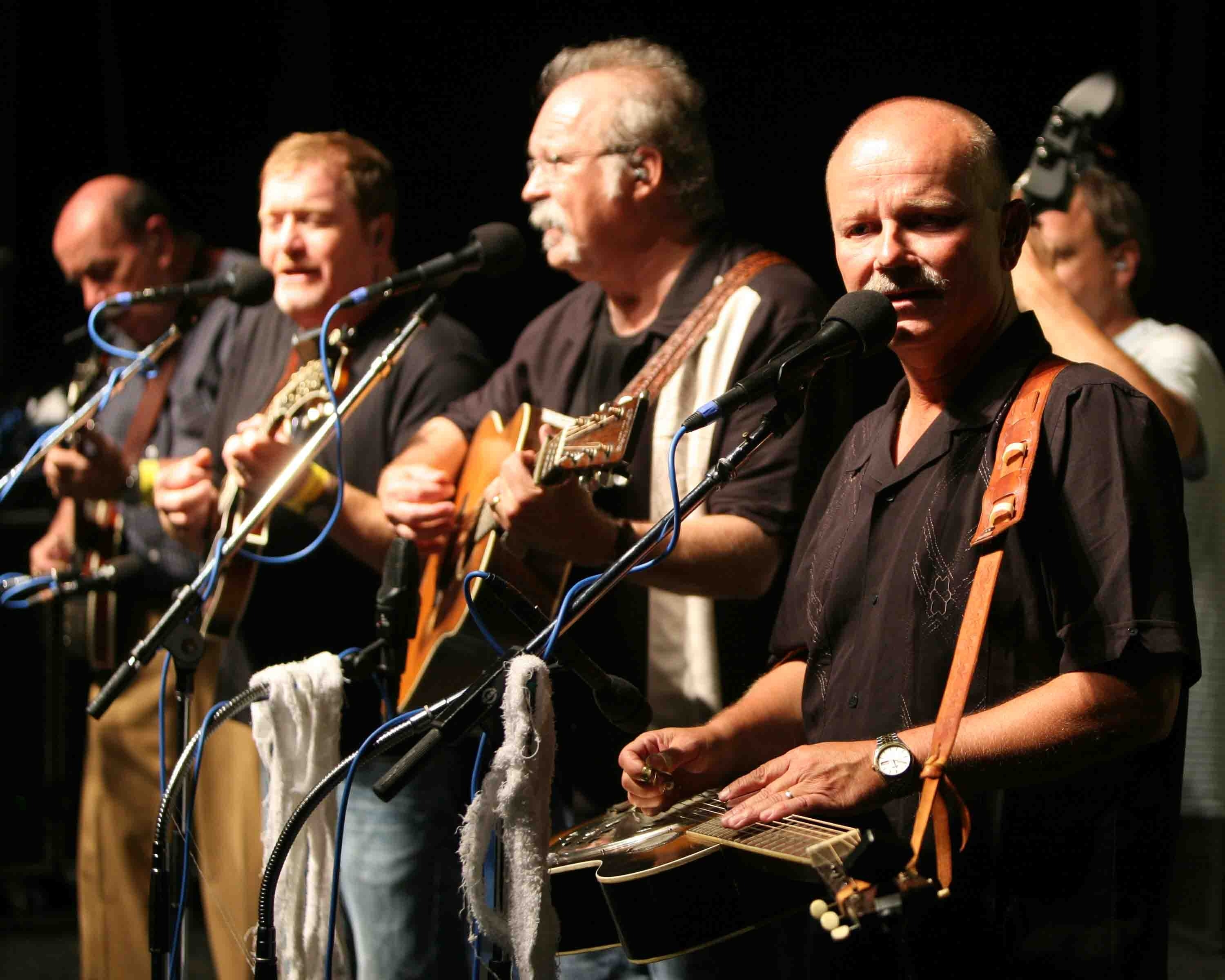
- The Seldom Scene with Mike Auldridge's replacement, Fred Travers (right)
- Studio albums: 12
- Compilation albums: 2

Mike Auldridge was an American resonator guitar (Dobro) player. In addition to his solo albums and recordings with the Seldom Scene, he has been featured as a performer and collaborator on numerous albums by other artists.

== Solo albums ==
- 1972: Dobro (Takoma)
- 1974: Blues and Blue Grass (Takoma)
- 1976: Mike Auldridge (Flying Fish)
- 1978: Mike Auldridge & 'Old Dog' (Flying Fish)
- 1978: Slidin' Smoke (Flying Fish) with Jeff Newman
- 1982: Eight String Swing (Sugar Hill)
- 1989: High Time (Sugar Hill) with Lou Reid and T. Michael Coleman
- 1990: Treasures Untold (Sugar Hill)
- 2000: This Old Town (Rebel) with Richard Bennett and Jimmy Gaudreau
- 2000: Tone Poems III (The Sounds Of The Great Slide & Resophonic Instruments) (Acoustic Disc) with Bob Brozman and David Grisman
- 2001: Blue Lonesome Wind (Rebel) with Richard Bennett and Jimmy Gaudreau
- 2014: Three Bells (Rounder) with Jerry Douglas and Rob Ickes

== Compilations ==
- 1987: Takoma - Plus One (Takoma) selections from Dobro and Blues and Bluegrass
- 1998: Dobro / Blues and Bluegrass (Takoma) (Complete re-issue of Dobro and Blues and Bluegrass)

== As a member of The Seldom Scene ==
- 1971: Act 1 (Rebel)
- 1973: Act Two (Rebel)
- 1973: Act III (Rebel)
- 1974: Old Train (Rebel)
- 1975: Live at The Cellar Door (Rebel)
- 1976: The New Seldom Scene Album (Rebel)
- 1978: Baptizing (Rebel)
- 1979: Act Four (Sugar Hill)
- 1981: After Midnight (Sugar Hill)
- 1983: At the Scene (Sugar Hill)
- 1985: Blue Ridge (Sugar Hill) with Jonathan Edwards
- 1986: 15th Anniversary Celebration (Sugar Hill)
- 1988: A Change of Scenery (Sugar Hill)
- 1990: Scenic Roots (Sugar Hill)
- 1992: Scene 20: 20th Anniversary Concert (Sugar Hill)
- 1994: Like We Used to Be (Sugar Hill)

== Also appears on ==
=== 1970–1976 ===
- 1970: Cliff Waldron and The New Shades Of Grass - Right On! (Rebel)
- 1970: Emerson and Waldron - Bluegrass Country (Rebel)
- 1971: The Country Gentlemen - Sound Off (Rebel)
- 1971: Cliff Waldron and The New Shades of Grass - Traveling Light (Rebel)
- 1972: The Bluegrass Tarheels - Tarheel Country (United)
- 1972: The Country Gentlemen - The Award Winning Country Gentlemen (Rebel)
- 1973: Cliff Waldron - Bluegrass Time (Rebel)
- 1974: Jimmy Arnold - Strictly Arnold (Rebel)
- 1975: Tony Rice - California Autumn (Rebel)
- 1976: Charles Browning - A Choirboy's Lament (Sounds Reasonable)
- 1976: The Country Gentlemen - Joe's Last Train (Rebel)
- 1976: Emmylou Harris - Elite Hotel (Reprise)
- 1976: Eddie Shelton - Expedition (Ridge Runner)
- 1976: Starland Vocal Band - Starland Vocal Band (Windsong)

=== 1977–1979 ===
- 1977: Bryan Bowers - The View from Home (Flying Fish)
- 1977: Jaime Brockett - North Mountain Velvet (Adelphi)
- 1977: Saul Broudy - Travels With Broudy (Adelphi)
- 1977: Bill Clifton - Clifton and Company (County)
- 1977: Jonathan Edwards - Sailboat (Warner Bros.)
- 1977: Linda Ronstadt - Simple Dreams (Asylum)
- 1977: Southbound - Southbound (Rebel)
- 1977: Starland Vocal Band - Rear View Mirror (Windsong)
- 1978: Emmylou Harris - Luxury Liner (Warner Bros.)
- 1978: Bill Harrell & The Virginians - Ballads and Bluegrass (Adelphi Records)
- 1978: Phil Rosenthal - Indian Summer (Flying Fish)
- 1979: Joe Uehlein - Groundwork: Songs Of Working People (Worker)

=== 1980–1982 ===
- 1980: Bryan Bowers - Home, Home On The Road (Flying Fish)
- 1980: The Country Gentlemen - Sit Down, Young Stranger (Sugar Hill)
- 1980: East Virginia - Pathways of Tradition (Rounder)
- 1980: The Goins Brothers - Wandering Soul (Rebel)
- 1980: Linda Ronstadt - Mad Love (Asylum)
- 1980: Peter Rowan - Medicine Trail (Flying Fish)
- 1980: John Starling - Long Time Gone (Sugar Hill)
- 1981: Grandpa Jones - Family Gathering (CMH)
- 1981: Hank Williams, Jr. - The Pressure Is On (Elektra)
- 1982: Doyle Lawson & Quicksilver - Quicksilver Rides Again
- 1982: Claire Lynch - Breakin' It (Ambush)
- 1982: Cathy Fink - Doggone My Time (Rooster)
- 1982: John Starling - Waitin' On A Southern Train (Sugar Hill)

=== 1983–1986 ===
- 1983: Bill Harrell and the Virginians - Walking in the Early Morning Dew (Rebel)
- 1983: Doyle Lawson & Quicksilver - Heavenly Treasures (Sugar Hill)
- 1983: Jimmy Arnold - Southern Soul (Rebel)
- 1983: Darrell Sanders - West Virginia Style (Webco)
- 1984: Cathy Fink And Friends - Grandma Slid Down the Mountain (Rounder)
- 1984: Karen Mackay - Annie Oakley Rides Again! (West Virginia Woman)
- 1985: Doyle Lawson & Quicksilver - Once & for Always (Sugar Hill)
- 1985: Bill Monroe - Bill Monroe And Stars Of The Bluegrass Hall Of Fame (MCA)
- 1985: Kate Wolf - Poet's Heart (Kaleidoscope)
- 1985: Merle Travis and Grandpa Jones -Farm & Home Hour (CMH)
- 1986: Doyle Lawson & Quicksilver - Beyond the Shadows (Sugar Hill)

=== 1987–1999 ===
- 1987: Mary Chapin Carpenter - Hometown Girl (Columbia)
- 1987: Bill Emerson and Pete Goble - Tennessee 1949 (Webco)
- 1987: Emmylou Harris - Angel Band (Warner Bros.)
- 1988: Larry Stephenson - Everytime I Sing a Love Song (Webco)
- 1989: Duffey, Waller, Adcock, and Gray - Classic Country Gents Reunion
- 1991: Penn Central - Bluefire (Platinum)
- 1995: Doc Watson - Docabilly (Sugar Hill)
- 1996: Tom Paxton - Live For The Record (Sugar Hill)

=== 2000–2005 ===
- 2001: Claire Lynch - Out in the Country (Copper Creek)
- 2002: Alice Gerrard - Calling Me Home: Songs of Love and Loss (Copper Creek)
- 2002: Paul Williams and Cliff Waldron - Higher Ground (Rebel)
- 2003: Rodney Hayden- Living the Good Life (Audium)
- 2004: Cindy Cashdollar - Slide Show (Silver Shot)
- 2004: Delta Moon - Goin' Down South (self-released)
- 2004: Orville Johnson - Freehand (self-released)
- 2004: Debi Smith - Cupid (self-released)
- 2004: Robin & Linda Williams - Deeper Waters (Red House)
- 2005: Gordon Titcomb - The Last Train (Rising Son)

=== 2006–2012 ===
- 2006: Jimmy Gaudreau - In Good Company (CMH)
- 2006: Chris Jones - Too Far Down the Road (Little Dog)
- 2006: Christine Lavin - One Meat Ball (Appleseed)
- 2006: Jimmy Arnold - Riding with Ol' Mosby (Rebel)
- 2006: Frank Wakefield - Don't Lie to Me (Orchard)
- 2007: Laurence Baer - Across A Bering Strait Bridge (CD Baby)
- 2007: John Starling and Carolina Star - Slidin' Home (Rebel)
- 2008: Emmylou Harris - All I Intended to Be (Nonesuch)
- 2009: Patty Loveless - Mountain Soul II (Saguaro Road)
- 2010: Eric Brace and Peter Cooper - Master Sessions (Red Beet)
- 2011: The Lost & Found - Down on Sawmill Road (Rebel)
- 2012: Lou Reid and Carolina - Callin' Me Back Home (KMA)

== Sources ==
- Mike-Auldridge at AllMusic
- Mike-Auldridge discography at Discogs
