= Dream Scene =

Studio album by The Seldom Scene
- Released: 1996
- Recorded: 1996
- Genre: Bluegrass, progressive bluegrass
- Label: Sugar Hill
- Producer: The Seldom Scene

The Seldom Scene chronology
Like We Used to Be (1994)	Dream Scene (1996)	Scene It All (2000)

Professional ratings
Review scores
Source	Rating
Allmusic	3/5 stars

Dream Scene is an album by American progressive bluegrass band The Seldom Scene. There were several personnel changes in the group after the unsuccessful comeback with John Starling. Mike Auldridge, Moondi Klein, and T. Michael Coleman left the group to form progressive band Chesapeake. Duffey and Eldridge recruited guitarist/singer Dudley Connell, dobroist Fred Travers and bass player Ronnie Simpkins to continue with the group. This album would be the last for John Duffey who died late in 1996.

== Track listing ==
1. Dry Run Creek (McPeak) 2:34
2. Going up on the Mountain (Gamble, Huff) 3:17
3. Willie Roy (Williams) 4:40
4. Tulsa Chili Bop (Pennington) 3:09
5. When I Get My Rewards (Kennerley) 3:40
6. They're at Rest Together (Traditional) 2:59
7. The Boatman (Hylton) 3:33
8. Love of the Mountains (Mills) 2:46
9. Little Sparrow (Fair Tender Ladies) (Traditional) 5:21
10. The Shape I'm In (Connell) 3:45
11. Blue Diamond (Ritchie) 5:15
12. Bad Moon Rising (Fogerty) 2:21

== Personnel ==
- Dudley Connell - vocals, guitar, mandolin
- John Duffey - mandolin, vocals
- Ben Eldridge - banjo, guitar, vocals
- Fred Travers - Dobro, guitar, vocals
- Ronnie Simpkins - bass, vocals
