= Scene 20: 20th Anniversary Concert =

Live album by The Seldom Scene
- Released: 1992
- Recorded: 1992
- Genre: Bluegrass, progressive bluegrass
- Label: Sugar Hill
- Producer: The Seldom Scene

The Seldom Scene chronology
Scenic Roots (1990)	Scene 20: 20th Anniversary Concert (1992)	Like We Used to Be (1994)

Professional ratings
Review scores
Source	Rating
Allmusic	3/5 stars

Scene 20: 20th Anniversary Concert is a live album by American progressive bluegrass band The Seldom Scene.

== Track listing ==
1. Introduction 00:43
2. I Haven't Got the Right to Love You (Buchanan, Claude) 03:05
3. Gardens and Memories (Starling) 03:42
4. House of Gold (Williams) 04:08
5. Pictures from Life's Other Side (Traditional) 06:02
6. Satan's Jeweled Crown (Eden) 04:27
7. Will You Be Ready to Go Home (Williams) 03:02
8. Mean Mother Blues (Starling) 03:58
9. Were You There When They Crucified My Lord? (Traditional) 04:09
10. The Weary Pilgrim (Rosenthal) 03:17
11. Leavin' Harlan (Rosenthal) 05:07
12. Take Him In (Rosenthal) 03:19
13. Stompin' at the Savoy (Goodman, Razaf, Sampson, Webb) 03:52
14. Something in the Wind (Rosenthal) 04:07
15. Muddy Water (Rosenthal) 03:41
16. Open Up the Window, Noah (Rosenthal) 02:59
17. Breakin' New Ground (Carl Jackson, Jerry Salley) 04:19
18. Old Train (Herb Pedersen, Nikki Pedersen) 02:13
19. Wait a Minute (Herb Pedersen) 04:59
20. Blue Ridge Cabin Home (Certain, Stacey) 03:11
21. Gypsy Moon (Coleman, Reid) 04:36
22. Walk Through This World with Me (Savage, Seamons) 02:43
23. In the Pines (Traditional) 04:39
24. And on Bass (Coleman) 04:01
25. Another Lonesome Day (Thatcher) 02:33
26. Have Mercy on My Soul (Coleman, Reid) 03:33
27. House of the Rising Sun/Walk Don't Run (Smith, Traditional) 08:32
28. In the Midnight Hour (Steve Cropper, Wilson Pickett) 03:34

== Personnel ==
- John Starling - vocals, guitar
- Phil Rosenthal - vocals
- Tom Gray - bass, vocals
- Lou Reid - vocals, guitar, mandolin
- John Duffey - mandolin, vocals
- Ben Eldridge - banjo, guitar, vocals
- Mike Auldridge - Dobro, guitar, vocals
- T. Michael Coleman - bass, vocals
