= Different Roads =

Compilation album by The Seldom Scene
- Released: 2007
- Recorded: 2007
- Genres: Bluegrass, progressive bluegrass
- Length: 41:29
- Label: Rebel Records
- Producer: The Seldom Scene

The Seldom Scene chronology
Scenechronized (2007)	Different Roads (2007)	Long Time... Seldom Scene (2014)

Professional ratings
Review scores
Source	Rating
Allmusic	4/5 stars

Different Roads is a compilation album by American progressive bluegrass band The Seldom Scene, containing songs from the group's oldest period - 1973 to 1976.

== Track listing ==
1. Different Roads (John Starling) 2:35
2. Old Train (Herb Pedersen, Nikki Pedersen) 2:19
3. Walk Through This World With Me (Savage, Seamons) 2:07
4. Gardens and Memories (John Starling) 2:44
5. Wait a Minute (Herb Pedersen) 3:38
6. Rebels 'Ye Rest (Pauline Beauchamp) 2:34
7. Last Train from Poor Valley (Norman Blake) 3:43
8. I've Lost You (Earl Scruggs) 2:39
9. Keep me from Blowin' Away (Paul Craft) 2:45
10. Reason for Being (John Duffey, hill) 3:22
11. If That's the Way You Feel (Ralph Stanley, Carter Stanley) 2:58
12. Easy Ride from Good Times to the Blues (Herb Pedersen) 3:03
13. Pictures from Life's Other Side (Traditional) 4:17
14. Pan American (Hank Williams) 2:45

== Personnel ==
- John Starling - vocals, guitar
- John Duffey - mandolin, vocals
- Ben Eldridge - banjo, guitar, vocals
- Mike Auldridge - Dobro, guitar, vocals
- Tom Gray - bass, vocals

with

- Paul Craft - guitar
- Mark Cuff - drums
- Ricky Skaggs - violin, viola
