= The Best of The Seldom Scene, Vol. 1 =

The Best Of The Seldom Scene

Greatest hits album by The Seldom Scene
- Released: 1987
- Recorded: 1987
- Genres: Bluegrass, progressive bluegrass
- Length: 48:56
- Label: Rebel Records

The Seldom Scene chronology
15th Anniversary Celebration (1986)	The Best Of The Seldom Scene (1987)	A Change of Scenery (1988)

Professional ratings
Review scores
Source	Rating
Allmusic	4.5/5 stars

The Best Of The Seldom Scene is a compilation album by American progressive bluegrass band The Seldom Scene.

== Track listing ==
1. "City of New Orleans" (Goodman) 2:57
2. "Sing Me Back Home" (Haggard) 2:56
3. "Muddy Water" (Rosenthal) 3:00
4. "500 Miles" (West) 3:17
5. "Hello Mary Lou" (Mangiaracina, Pitney) 2:16
6. "Small Exception of Me" (Hatch, Trent) 2:58
7. "Sweet Baby James" (Taylor) 3:06
8. "Heaven" (McSpadden) 2:56
9. "With Body and Soul" (Stauffer) 3:56
10. "Paradise" (Prine) 2:18
11. "Darling Corey" 3:43
12. "Cannonball" 2:39
13. "Sweetest Gift" (Coats) 2:34
14. "Another Lonesome Day" (Thatcher) 2:04
15. "Little Georgia Rose" (Monroe) 2:57
16. "Rider" (trad.) 5:23

== Personnel ==
- John Starling - vocals, guitar, mandolin
- John Duffey - mandolin, vocals
- Ben Eldridge - banjo, guitar, vocals
- Mike Auldridge - Dobro, guitar, vocals
- Tom Gray - bass, vocals

with

- Ricky Skaggs - violin, mandolin
