= A Change of Scenery =

A Change Of Scenery

Studio album by The Seldom Scene
- Released: 1988
- Recorded: 1988
- Genre: Bluegrass, progressive bluegrass
- Label: Sugar Hill
- Producer: The Seldom Scene

The Seldom Scene chronology
15th Anniversary Celebration (1986)	A Change Of Scenery (1988)	Scenic Roots (1990)

Professional ratings
Review scores
Source	Rating
Allmusic	3/5 stars

A Change Of Scenery is an album by American progressive bluegrass band The Seldom Scene. It is the first album with vocalist/guitarist Lou Reid and bassist T. Michael Coleman.

== Track listing ==
No.	Title	Writer(s)	Length
1.	"Breaking New Ground"	Carl Jackson, Jerry Salley	3:10
2.	"Casting My Shadow in the Road"	Rushing, Rushing, Scruggs	3:46
3.	"Settin' Me Up"	Knopfler	3:46
4.	"Alabama Clay"	Larry Cordle, Scaife	4:29
5.	"I'll Be No Stranger There"	Alcorn, Combs, Sebren	2:13
6.	"West Texas Wind"	Ims	4:14
7.	"Satan's Choir"	Campbell	3:55
8.	"In Despair"	Ahr, Pennington	2:32
9.	"What Goes On"	Lennon, McCartney	3:50
10.	"Brand New Walking Shoes"	Larry Cordle, Patton	3:25
11.	"One Way Rider"	Crowell, Crowell	3:45

== Personnel ==
- Lou Reid – vocals, guitar, fiddle
- John Duffey – mandolin, vocals
- Ben Eldridge – banjo
- Mike Auldridge – Dobro, vocals
- T. Michael Coleman – bass, vocals

with

- Robbie Magruder – percussion
