= Scenechronized =

Studio album by The Seldom Scene
- Released: 2007
- Recorded: 2007
- Genre: Bluegrass, progressive bluegrass
- Length: 40:10
- Label: Sugar Hill
- Producer: The Seldom Scene

The Seldom Scene chronology
Scene It All (2000)	Scenechronized (2007)	Different Roads (2007)

Professional ratings
Review scores
Source	Rating
Allmusic	3.5/5 stars

Scenechronized is an album by American progressive bluegrass band The Seldom Scene. It was nominated for the Best Bluegrass Album Grammy in 2007.

== Track listing ==
1. Hometown Blues (Steve Earle) 3:07
2. Heart and Soul (David Norris) 3:18
3. This Morning at Nine (Sidney Campbell) 2:31
4. A Hundred and Ten in the Shade (John Fogerty) 4:03
5. Katie Dear (Public Domain) 4:07
6. Sweetest Love (Carter Stanley) 2:27
7. Don't Bother with White Satin (John Duffey, Ann Hill) 3:00
8. Mama Tried (Merle Haggard) 2:09
9. You Remind Me of the Blues (Paul Craft) 2:25
10. Please Be with Me (Scott Boyer) 3:24
11. Sad Old Train (Donna Hughes) 2:54
12. Tomorrow Is a Long Time (Bob Dylan) 3:58
13. Too Bad You're No Good (Paul Craft, Cadillac Holmes) 2:47

== Personnel ==
- Dudley Connell - vocals, guitar, mandolin
- Lou Reid - mandolin, vocals
- Ben Eldridge - banjo, guitar, vocals
- Fred Travers - Dobro, guitar, vocals
- Ronnie Simpkins - bass, vocals

with

- Chris Eldridge - guitar
