= Live at The Cellar Door =

Live album by The Seldom Scene
- Released: 1975
- Recorded: December 1974
- Genres: Bluegrass, progressive bluegrass
- Label: Rebel
- Producer: Gary B. Reid

The Seldom Scene chronology
Old Train (1973)	Live at The Cellar Door (1975)	The New Seldom Scene Album (1976)

Professional ratings
Review scores
Source	Rating
Allmusic	4.5/5 stars

Live at The Cellar Door is a live album by American progressive bluegrass band The Seldom Scene. The Washington Post called it "not only a landmark for the progressive bluegrass scene that originated here in Washington, but may be the band's finest representation on disc."

== Track listing ==
1. "Doing My Time" (Jimmie Skinner) 5:38
2. "California Cottonfields" (Dallas Frazier, Earl Montgomery) 3:08
3. Band Intros 1:15
4. "Panhandle Country" (Bill Monroe) 2:13
5. "Muddy Waters" (Phil Rosenthal) 3:14
6. "Rawhide" (Bill Monroe) 2:41
7. "Baby Blue" (Bob Dylan) 3:39
8. "City of New Orleans" (Steve Goodman) 3:03
9. "Grandfather's Clock" (Henry Clay Work) 4:50
10. "The Fields Have Turned Brown" (Carter Stanley) 3:15
11. "Hit Parade of Love" (Jimmy Martin, Wade Birchfield) 3:18
12. "Will the Circle Be Unbroken?" (Traditional; arranged by the Seldom Scene) 3:26
13. "Pick Away" (Vic Jordan, Lester Flatt) 2:40
14. "Dark Hollow" (Wilmer "Bill" Browning) 2:10
15. "Small Exception of Me" (Tony Hatch, Jackie Trent) 3:15
16. "If I Were a Carpenter" (Tim Hardin) 3:00
17. "Old Gray Bonnet" (Percy Wenrich, Stanley Murphy) 2:33
18. "C & O Canal" (John Starling) 3:09
19. "Georgia Rose" (Bill Monroe) 3:04
20. "Colorado Turnaround" (Evelyn Graves) 2:37
21. "He Rode All the Way to Texas" (John Starling) 2:36
22. "White Line" (Willie P. Bennett) 3:34
23. "Rider" (Traditional) 7:10

== Personnel ==
The Seldom Scene

- John Starling - vocals, guitar
- John Duffey - mandolin, vocals
- Ben Eldridge - banjo, guitar, vocals
- Mike Auldridge - Dobro, guitar, vocals
- Tom Gray - bass, vocals
