= Scene It All =

Studio album by The Seldom Scene
- Released: 2000
- Recorded: 2000
- Genre: Bluegrass, progressive bluegrass
- Label: Sugar Hill
- Producer: The Seldom Scene

The Seldom Scene chronology
Dream Scene (1996)	Scene It All (2000)	Scenechronized (2007)

Professional ratings
Review scores
Source	Rating
AllMusic	3.5/5 stars
The Encyclopedia of Popular Music	3/5 stars

Scene It all is an album by American progressive bluegrass band the Seldom Scene, released in 2000. Ben Eldridge re-recruited Lou Reid, this time on mandolin, to replace John Duffey, who died in 1996.

== Critical reception ==
Exclaim! wrote that "it's undeniably good, but that last intangible, that spark that kicks something over the top from damn good and into truly great, is missing."

== Track listing ==
1. Rollin' and Tumblin' (Morganfield, Muddy Waters) 4:07
2. Dusty (Norris) 3:32
3. I Will Always Be Waiting for You (McReynolds, McReynolds) 2:43
4. Blue and Lonesome (Monroe, Williams) 2:59
5. You Better Get Right (Smith, Smith) 2:19
6. Walking the Dog (Grishen, Pierce) 2:45
7. From This Moment On (Bonnie Guitar) 3:40
8. When the Walls Come Tumblin' Down (Graham, Jackson, Laney) 2:50
9. Boots of Spanish Leather (Bob Dylan) 4:51
10. Trust in the Tide (Mendelsohn) 3:10
11. One Step Up (Bruce Springsteen) 3:46
12. Nadine (Chuck Berry) 3:39 ^{A} » From This Moment On (Bonnie Guitar) 2:06 (Hidden track)^{A}

^{A}A rehearsal recording of "From This Moment On" with only the first verse and chorus is included at the end of Track 12; total track length is 6:58, including 1:03 (1 minute : 3 seconds) of silence in between "Nadine" and "From This Moment On."

== Personnel ==
- Dudley Connell - vocals, guitar, mandolin
- Lou Reid - mandolin, vocals
- Ben Eldridge - banjo, guitar, vocals
- Fred Travers - Dobro, guitar, vocals
- Ronnie Simpkins - bass, vocals
