= At the Scene =

Studio album by The Seldom Scene
- Released: 1983
- Recorded: 1983
- Studio: Bias Recording Co., Springfield, Virginia
- Genre: Bluegrass, progressive bluegrass
- Label: Sugar Hill
- Producer: Bill McElroy, The Seldom Scene

The Seldom Scene chronology
| After Midnight (1981) | At the Scene (1983) | Blue Ridge (1985) |

Professional ratings
Review scores
| Source | Rating |
|---|---|
| Allmusic | 3/5 stars |

At the Scene is an album by American progressive bluegrass band The Seldom Scene.

== Track listing ==
1. "A Girl I Know" (Phil Rosenthal) – 2:48
2. "Jamaica, Say You Will" (Jackson Browne) – 3:27
3. "Open up the Window, Noah" (Phil Rosenthal) – 2:23
4. "Winter Wind" (Phil Rosenthal) – 2:42
5. "Heal It" (Byron Hill, Mike Reid) – 3:41
6. "The Weary Pilgrim" (Phil Rosenthal) – 2:43
7. "It Turns Me Inside Out" (Jerry Crutchfield) – 3:30
8. "The Champion" (Richard Landis) – 3:32
9. "Born of the Wind" (Paul Craft) – 2:38
10. "Peaceful Dreams" (Harold Douglas Handy) – 4:30
11. "Let Our Mother Nature Have Her Way" (Clark, Southerland) – 3:07
12. "I'll Remember You Love in My Prayers" (Hayes) – 3:04
13. "Some Morning Soon" (Lynch) – 3:36

== Personnel ==
The Seldom Scene

- Phil Rosenthal - vocals, guitar, mandolin
- John Duffey - mandolin, vocals
- Ben Eldridge - banjo, guitar, vocals
- Mike Auldridge - Dobro, guitar, vocals
- Tom Gray - bass, vocals

with:

- Robbie Magruder - drums
- Jimmy Arnold - violin, harmonica

Technical

- Raymond Simone - cover design
- Jim McGuire - photography
