= T. Michael Coleman =

American musician (born 1951)

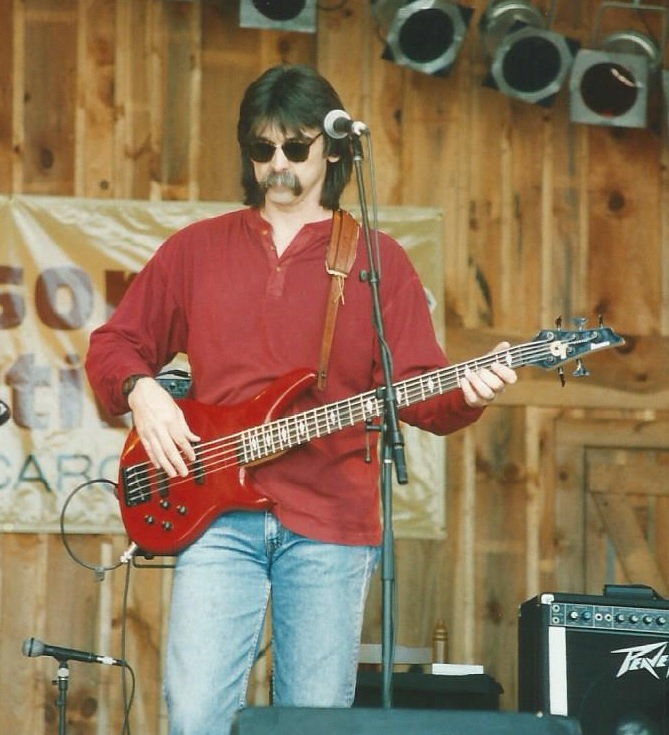
- Coleman performing at Merlefest with Doc Watson in 1994

Background information
- Born: Thomas Michael Coleman; January 3, 1951 (age 75)
- Genres: Bluegrass music, folk music, country music
- Occupations: Musician, cinematographer
- Instrument: Bass
- Years active: 1970–present
- Website: tmichaelcoleman.com

Thomas Michael Coleman (born January 3, 1951) is an American bass player of bluegrass and folk music. He is best known for work with Doc Watson and the Seldom Scene.

== Biography ==
=== Doc Watson ===
Coleman grew up in Mayodan, North Carolina, graduating from Madison-Mayodan High School in 1969 where he was a part of bluegrass and folk groups. After working as a sound technician each time Doc Watson came to nearby Appalachian State University, Coleman played bass with Doc Watson and his son Merle starting in 1974 and continuing until 1986. Coleman also toured with Doc Watson and David Holt during the final three years of Doc's life.

=== Seldom Scene ===
After his time with Watson, Coleman joined the Seldom Scene, replacing Tom Gray. Coleman was with The Seldom Scene from 1986 until 1995. There were initial objections to Coleman's use of an electric bass in the normally acoustic bluegrass lineup, but Coleman's playing fit the group's sound.

=== Chesapeake ===
After leaving the Seldom Scene, Coleman joined Chesapeake with Moondi Klein, Mike Auldridge, and Jimmy Gaudreau. They released three albums on the Sugar Hill label. With no banjo, they were more acoustic country than bluegrass. Chesapeake disbanded in 1999 when their contract with Sugar Hill ended.

=== Sutton, Holt & Coleman ===
In 2013, Coleman recorded the album Ready for the Times with Bryan Sutton and David Holt. They recorded the album as a tribute to Doc Watson. The trio got together in 2011, and have performed frequently under the name Deep River Rising.

=== Pocket ===
Released in 2016, Pocket was Coleman's first album. Contributors included Alan Bibey, Sam Bush, Kelen Coleman, Jerry Douglas, Buddy Greene, Lamar Hill, David Holt, Rob Ickes, Jens Kruger, Jack Lawrence, Jeff Little, Pat McInerney, Stephen Mougin, Herb Pedersen, Allen Shadd, Bryan Sutton, Doc Watson, and Tony Williamson.

=== Awards ===
Projects that Coleman was involved with were nominated five times for a Grammy Award: once in 1982, twice in 1998, once in 1982, and once in 1994.

=== Personal life ===
Coleman is a videographer and film maker, known for his work on Children of Armageddon (2008), Broke: The New American Dream (2009), and Inside the Afghanistan War (2012). Coleman's daughter is actress Kelen Coleman.

== Discography ==
=== Solo albums ===
- 2016: Pocket (Chesterbury)

=== With Sutton, Holt, and Coleman ===
- 2013: Ready for the Times (High Windy)

=== With Doc Watson ===
- 1975: Memories (United Artists)
- 1976: Doc and the Boys (United Artists)
- 1977: Lonesome Road (United Artists)
- 1978: Look Away! (United Artists)
- 1979: Live and Pickin' (United Artists)
- 1980: Reflections (RCA)
- 1981: Red Rocking Chair (Flying Fish)
- 1983: Doc and Merle Watson's Guitar Album (Flying Fish)
- 1984: Down South (Sugar Hill)
- 1985: Pickin' the Blues (Flying Fish)
- 1986: Riding the Midnight Train (Sugar Hill)
- 1987: Portrait (Sugar Hill)
- 1990: On Praying Ground (Sugar Hill)
- 1991: My Dear Old Southern Home (Sugar Hill)
- 1992: Remembering Merle (Sugar Hill)
- 1995: Docabilly (Sugar Hill)
- 1999: Third Generation Blues (Sugar Hill)
- 2002: Round the Table Again (Sugar Hill)

=== With The Seldom Scene ===
- 1988: A Change of Scenery (Sugar Hill)
- 1990: Scenic Roots (Sugar Hill)
- 1992: Scene 20: 20th Anniversary Concert (Sugar Hill)
- 1994: Like We Used to Be (Sugar Hill)

=== With Chesapeake ===
- 1994: Rising Tide (Sugar Hill)
- 1995: Full Sail (Sugar Hill)
- 1997: Pier Pressure (Sugar Hill)
- 2014: Hook, Live & Sinker (Chesterbury) compilation of live performances

=== With Mike Auldridge and Lou Reid ===
- 1989: High Time (Sugar Hill)

=== As composer ===
- 1981: Doc and Merle Watson - Red Rocking Chair (Flying Fish Records) - track 1, "Sadie" (co-written with Byron Hill)
- 1988: Jack McDuff - The Re-Entry (Muse) - track 2, "One Hundred Years" (co-written with B.J. Wright)
- 1993: Lou Reid - Carolina Blue (Webco) - track 4, "Oh Lord Have Mercy (On My Soul)" (co-written with Lou Reid)
- 1996: Doc and Merle Watson - Watson County (Flying Fish Records) - track 15, "Sadie" (co-written with Byron Hill)
- 2006: Doc and Merle Watson - Black Mountain Rag (Rounder Records) - track 11, "Sadie" (co-written with Byron Hill)
- 2010: Lou Reid and Carolina - Sounds Like Heaven To Me (Rural Rhythm) - track 13, "Oh Lord Have Mercy (On My Soul)" (co-written with Lou Reid)
- 2011: Lonesome Highway - Got Away with Murder (CD Baby) - track 5, "Red Georgia Clay" (co-written with Lou Reid)
- 2015: Jamie Harper - Old Pal (Mountain Fever) - track 8, "Her Memories Bound to Ride" (co-written with Lou Reid)

=== As producer ===
- 1988: Robin and Linda Williams - All Broken Hearts Are the Same (Sugar Hill)
- 1989: The Smith Sisters - Roadrunner (Flying Fish)

=== Also appears on ===
- 1976: Mike Auldridge - Mike Auldridge (Flying Fish)
- 1976: Gove Scrivenor - Shady Gove (Flying Fish)
- 1979: Gove Scrivenor - Coconut Gove (Flying Fish)
- 1980: Curly Seckler and Nashville Grass - Take a Little Time (CMH)
- 1982: Marty Stuart - Busy Bee Cafe (Sugar Hill)
- 1983: Dan Crary - Guitar (Sugar Hill)
- 1984: The Smith Sisters - Bluebird (Flying Fish)
- 1986: Johnny Cash - Believe in Him (Word)
- 1986: The Smith Sisters - Mockingbird (Flying Fish)
- 1986: Marty Stuart - Marty Stuart (Columbia)
- 1990: Mike Auldridge - Treasures Untold (Sugar Hill)
- 1992: Marty Stuart - Let There Be Country (Columbia)
- 2003: The Chieftains - Further Down the Old Plank Road (Victor / Arista)
