= Act Two (The Seldom Scene album) =

Studio album by The Seldom Scene
- Released: 1973
- Recorded: 1973
- Genres: Bluegrass, progressive bluegrass
- Label: Rebel
- Producer: Gary B. Reid

The Seldom Scene chronology
Act I (1972)	Act Two (1973)	Act III (1973)

Professional ratings
Review scores
Source	Rating
Allmusic	4/5 stars

Act Two is the second album by American progressive bluegrass band The Seldom Scene. The band continues to benefit from all their trademarks: John Starling folkie lead vocals blend with high tenors of John Duffey, completed with Mike Auldridge's third vocals and Dobro solos, plus all that strengthened by Tom Gray's solid bass playing, not to forget Ben Eldridge's banjo and John Duffey's mandolin fancy licks.

== Track listing ==
1. "Last Train from Poor Valley" (Norman Blake) 3:45
2. "Gardens and Memories" (John Starling) 2:46
3. "Paradise" (John Prine) 2:26
4. "Small Exception of Me" (Tony Hatch, Jackie Trent) 3:04
5. "Train Leaves Here This Morning" (Gene Clark, Bernie Leadon) 3:07
6. "Keep Me From Blowin' Away" (Paul Craft) 2:46
7. "Hello Mary Lou" (Cayet Mangiaracina, Gene Pitney) 2:23
8. "Lara's Theme" (Maurice Jarre) 1:24
9. "I've Lost You" (Earl Scruggs) 2:42
10. "The Sweetest Gift" (Benny Cain, Ronnie Bucke) 2:42
11. "Reason for Being" (John Duffey, Ann Hill) 3:24
12. "Smokin' Hickory" (Ben Eldridge) 2:25
13. "House of Gold" (Hank Williams) 3:14

== Personnel ==
The Seldom Scene

- John Starling – lead vocals, guitar
- John Duffey – mandolin, tenor vocals
- Ben Eldridge – banjo, second guitar, baritone vocals
- Mike Auldridge – Dobro, second guitar, tenor vocals
- Tom Gray – bass, baritone vocals
