= Long Time... Seldom Scene =

Studio album by the Seldom Scene
- Released: April 22, 2014
- Recorded: 2014
- Genre: Bluegrass, progressive bluegrass
- Label: Smithsonian Folkways Recordings
- Producer: The Seldom Scene

The Seldom Scene chronology
| Different Roads (2007) | Long Time... Seldom Scene (2014) | Changes (2019) |

Long Time... Seldom Scene is American progressive bluegrass band the Seldom Scene's first-ever release with Smithsonian Folkways. "Hickory Wind" is a homesick ballad that features the vocals of longtime friend of the Scene, Emmylou Harris, who originally recorded the song on her 'Blue Kentucky Girl' album in 1980. "Wait a Minute" is a fresh take of a song originally recorded for 1974's Old Train album and includes founding member John Starling (vocals) and guests Rickie Simpkins (fiddle) and Chris Eldridge (guitar), son of founding member Ben Eldridge (banjo).

The Seldom Scene are founding member Ben Eldridge (banjo), Lou Reid (mandolin/vocals), Dudley Connell (guitar/vocals), Ronnie Simpkins (bass/vocals), and Fred Travers (dobro/vocals). The album was produced by three-time GRAMMY award-winning Smithsonian Folkways Sound Production Supervisor Pete Reiniger.

== Track listing ==
1. California Cottonfields 3:04
2. Wait a Minute (feat. John Starling) 5:13
3. What Am I Doing Hangin' Round 2:50
4. Hickory Wind (feat. Emmylou Harris) 4:03
5. I'll Be No Stranger There 2:20
6. Walk Through This World with Me 2:32
7. Big Train (From Memphis) 2:46
8. With Body and Soul (feat John Starling, Emmylou Harris, and Tom Gray) 3:22
9. Paradise 2:57
10. It's All Over Now, Baby Blue 3:20
11. Mean Mother Blues (feat. John Starling) 3:08
12. My Better Years 3:08
13. Little Georgia Rose (feat. John Starling) 2:54
14. Like I Used to Do 4:09
15. Through the Bottom of the Glass 2:43
16. Lorena 5:27

== Personnel ==
- Dudley Connell - vocals, guitar
- Lou Reid - mandolin, vocals
- Ben Eldridge - banjo, guitar, vocals
- Fred Travers - dobro, guitar, vocals
- Ronnie Simpkins - bass, vocals

with

- Chris Eldridge - guitar
- Rickie Simpkins - fiddle
- John Starling - vocals, guitar
- Tom Gray - bass
- Emmylou Harris - vocals

== Chart performance ==
| Chart (2014) | Peak position |
|---|---|
| US Top Bluegrass Albums (Billboard) | 3 |
