= After Midnight (The Seldom Scene album) =

Studio album by The Seldom Scene
- Released: 1981
- Recorded: 1981
- Genre: Bluegrass, progressive bluegrass
- Label: Sugar Hill
- Producer: Bill McElroy

The Seldom Scene chronology
Act IV (1979)	After Midnight (1981)	At the Scene (1983)

Professional ratings
Review scores
Source	Rating
Allmusic	3/5 stars

After Midnight is an album by American progressive bluegrass band The Seldom Scene.

== Track listing ==
1. "Lay Down Sally" (Eric Clapton, Marcy Levy, George Terry) 4:08
2. "Hearts Overflowing" (Michael Brewer) 3:56
3. "The Old Home Town" (Lester Flatt) 2:39
4. "Stompin' at the Savoy" (Benny Goodman, Andy Razaf, Edgar Sampson, Chick Webb) 3:28
5. "The Border Incident" (John Duffey) 4:25
6. "Come Early Morning" (McDill) 2:56
7. "After Midnight" (JJ Cale) 4.51
8. "If I Had Left It Up To You" (Merle Haggard) 3:24
9. "Heartsville Pike" (Jim McReynolds, Jesse McReynolds) 3:26
10. "Stolen Love" (Phil Rosenthal) 3:51
11. "Let Old Mother Nature Have Her Way" (Louie Clark, Loys Southerland) 3:07

== Personnel ==
The Seldom Scene

- Phil Rosenthal – vocals, guitar
- John Duffey – mandolin, vocals
- Ben Eldridge – banjo, guitar, vocals
- Mike Auldridge – Dobro, guitar, vocals
- Tom Gray – bass, vocals

with

- Carl Nelson – violin
