= Blue Ridge (album) =

Studio album by Jonathan Edwards and The Seldom Scene
- Released: 1985
- Studio: Bias Studios, Springfield, Virginia
- Genre: Rock/pop, country, folk, bluegrass, singer-songwriter
- Label: Sugar Hill

The Seldom Scene chronology
| At the Scene (1983) | Blue Ridge (1985) | 15th Anniversary Celebration (1986) |

Jonathan Edwards chronology
| Live! (1980) | Blue Ridge (1985) | Little Hands (1987) |

Professional ratings
Review scores
| Source | Rating |
|---|---|
| Allmusic | 4/5 stars |

Blue Ridge is the sixth studio album (eighth total album) released by American singer-songwriter Jonathan Edwards. It features the bluegrass band, The Seldom Scene.

== Track listing ==
1. "Don't This Road Look Rough and Rocky" (Lester Flatt, Earl Scruggs) – 3:37
2. "How Long Have I Been Waiting for You" (Jonathan Edwards) – 1:57
3. "Blue Ridge" (Bob Artis, Rick Mallis) – 3:31
4. "Seven Daffodils" (Lee Hays, Fran Moseley) – 3:42
5. "Sunshine" (Jonathan Edwards) – 2:57
6. "Back to Where I Don't Belong" (Phil Rosenthal) – 2:40
7. "If I Gave You" (Gray, Gray, Martin) – 2:36
8. "Honey, I Won't Be Around" (Phil Rosenthal) – 2:53
9. "Only a Hobo" (Bob Dylan) – 3:22
10. "God Gave You to Me" (Ralph Stanley) – 2:47
11. "Little Hands" (Jonathan Edwards) – 3:08
12. "I Don't Believe I'll Stay Here Anymore" (Al Anderson) – 3:26
13. "Don't Crawfish Me, Baby" (Jody Emerson, Wild Bill Emerson) – 4:17

== Personnel ==
- Jonathan Edwards – vocals, guitar, harmonica

The Seldom Scene

- Phil Rosenthal – guitar, vocals
- John Duffey – mandolin, vocals
- Ben Eldridge – banjo, guitar, vocals
- Mike Auldridge – Dobro, guitar, vocals
- Tom Gray – bass, vocals

with:

- Kenny White – piano
- Robbie Magruder – percussion

Technical

- Bill McElroy - engineer
- Raymond Simone - cover design
