= California Autumn =

Studio album by Tony Rice
- Released: 1975
- Genres: Americana, bluegrass, folk
- Length: 36:29
- Label: Rebel Records
- Producer: John Starling

Tony Rice chronology
Guitar (1970)	California Autumn (1975)	Tony Rice (1977)

Professional ratings
Review scores
Source	Rating
Allmusic	3/5 stars

California Autumn is an album by American guitarist Tony Rice, released in 1975. Rice's backup band includes members of Seldom Scene, as well as other musicians including Jerry Douglas and Ricky Skaggs.

== Track listing ==
1. "California Autumn" (Tony Rice) – 3:22
2. "Bullet Man" (Tony Rice) – 2:53
3. "Mr. Poverty" (Larry Rice) – 2:51
4. "Billy In The Low Ground" (Traditional) – 2:41
5. "Red Haired Boy" (Traditional) – 3:22
6. "Good Woman's Love" (Cy Coben) – 3:07
7. "You Don't Know My Mind" (Jimmie Skinner) – 2:58
8. "Alone And Forsaken" (Hank Williams) – 3:23
9. "Bugle Call Rag" (Billy Meyers, Jack Pettis, Elmer Schoebel) – 2:44
10. "Georgia on My Mind" (Hoagy Carmichael, Stuart Gorrell) – 3:15
11. "Scarborough Fair" (Traditional) – 2:38
12. "Beaumont Rag" (Traditional) – 3:15

== Personnel ==
- Tony Rice – guitar, vocals
- Larry Rice – mandolin
- Ricky Skaggs – fiddle, mandolin, violin, vocals
- J. D. Crowe – banjo
- Ben Eldridge – banjo
- Jerry Douglas – dobro
- Mike Auldridge – dobro
- Tom Gray – bass
- John Starling – guitar, vocals

Production notes

- John Starling – producer, mixing
- George Massenburg – engineer
- Fred Carlson – design
