= Rising Tide (Chesapeake album) =

Studio album by Chesapeake
- Released: 1994
- Studio: Bias Studios, Springfield, Virginia; Music Row Audio, Nashville, Tennessee
- Genre: Bluegrass; Progressive bluegrass
- Length: 49:42
- Label: Sugar Hill Records
- Producer: Chesapeake

Chesapeake chronology
Rising Tide (1994)	Full Sail (1997)

Professional ratings
Review scores
Source	Rating
Allmusic	3/5 stars

Rising Tide is a debut album by the progressive bluegrass band Chesapeake.

== Track listing ==
1. "Black Jack Davey" (Traditional) 3:19
2. "The Morning Blues" (Traditional) 3:43
3. "Columbus Stockade" (Traditional) 3:56
4. "Darcey Farrow" (Tom Campbell, Steve Gillette) 5:26
5. "Dreamer Believer" (Harvey Reid) 3:16
6. "High Sierras" (Harley Allen) 4:12
7. "Always on a Mountain" (Chuck Howard) 2:45
8. "Cypress Grove" (Traditional) 3:20
9. "Genie in the Wine" (T. Michael Coleman) 3:07
10. "2:10 Train" (Linda Albertano, Tom Campbell) 4:08
11. "Summer Wages" (Ian Tyson) 5:35
12. "Shady Grove" (Traditional) 2:38
13. "Moondance" (Van Morrison) 4:17

== Personnel ==
- Moondi Klein - lead vocals, guitar, piano
- Mike Auldridge - Dobro, lap steel, pedal steel, guitar, vocals
- Jimmy Gaudreau - mandolin, guitar, vocals
- T. Michael Coleman - bass guitar, guitar, vocals

with

- Pat McInerney - percussion, drums
