= Act I (Seldom Scene album) =

Studio album by the Seldom Scene
- Released: 1972
- Recorded: 1972
- Studio: R.D. Homer Associates, Clinton, Maryland
- Genre: Bluegrass, progressive bluegrass
- Label: Rebel
- Producer: Charles R. Freeland

The Seldom Scene chronology
Act I (1972)	Act II (1973)

Professional ratings
Review scores
Source	Rating
AllMusic	4/5 stars

Act I is the debut studio album by the American progressive bluegrass band the Seldom Scene, released in 1972. It is regarded one of the best and most influential albums ever recorded in the genre.

== Track listing ==
1. "Raised By The Railroad Line" (Paul Craft) 2:59
2. "Darling Corey" (Traditional); arranged by John Duffey) 3:43
3. "Want of a Woman" (Paul Craft) 2:16
4. "Sweet Baby James" (James Taylor) 3:09
5. "Joshua" (Traditional; arranged by Mike Auldridge) 2:41
6. "Will There Be Any Stars in My Crown?" (Traditional; arranged by John Duffey) 3:11
7. "City of New Orleans" (Steve Goodman) 3:02
8. "With Body and Soul" (Virginia Stauffer) 3:57
9. "Summertime Is Past and Gone" (Bill Monroe) 2:13
10. "500 Miles" (Hedy West) 3:21
11. "Cannonball" (Traditional; arranged by Mike Auldridge) 2:44
12. "What Am I Doing Hanging 'Round?" (Michael Martin Murphey) 2:53

== Personnel ==
The Seldom Scene

- John Starling – vocals, guitar
- John Duffey – mandolin, vocals
- Ben Eldridge – banjo, guitar, vocals
- Mike Auldridge – Dobro, guitar, vocals
- Tom Gray – bass, vocals

Technical

- Roy Homer - engineer
- Ronnie Bucke - cover photography
