= Chesapeake (band) =

American bluegrass band

- Origin: Bethesda, Maryland, United States
- Genres: Folk, folk rock, progressive bluegrass
- Years active: 1994–1999
- Label: Sugar Hill
- Spinoff of: Seldom Scene
- Past members: Jimmy Gaudreau; Mike Auldridge; T. Michael Coleman; Moondi Klein

Chesapeake was an American bluegrass band formed in 1994 in Bethesda, Maryland as a direct offshoot from The Seldom Scene.

== History ==
Mike Auldridge, T. Michael Coleman, and Moondi Klein, who played together in Seldom Scene in the mid '90's didn't feel satisfied with the way John Duffey led the group with only occasional playing and keeping their day jobs. All of them wanted to play more seriously and started to play outside the Seldom Scene. The three formed Chesapeake along with Jimmy Gaudreau, mandolinist of the Tony Rice Unit. This occurred in mid to late 1994, after the release of their last album with the Seldom Scene, "Like We Used to Be". Chesapeake stayed together for five years and then disbanded; Mike Auldridge to pursue his own solo music, while Jimmy Gaudreau and Moondi Klein continued to play together as a duo.

== Music style ==
Chesapeake's music style cannot be clearly defined, as it is a blend of bluegrass, progressive bluegrass, folk, folk-rock, country, rock and more. Folk songwriters such as Tom Paxton and Steve Gillette influenced their music as well as rock performers such as Van Morrison and Little Feat. Their music was strongly led by Dobro and mandolin with Auldridge adding lap steel and pedal steel guitar to their arrangements. Later on the band added more percussion to their music.

== Members ==
- Moondi Klein - lead vocals, guitar
- Mike Auldridge - Dobro, lap steel, pedal steel, guitar, vocals
- Jimmy Gaudreau - mandolin, guitar, vocals
- T. Michael Coleman - bass guitar, vocals

with

- Pat McInerney - percussion, drums

== Discography ==
During the short time the group was together (1994–1999), they released 3 studio albums. A compilation of live recordings was released in 2014.

- Rising Tide (Sugar Hill, 1994)
- Full Sail (Sugar Hill, 1996)
- Pier Pressure (Sugar Hill, 1997)
- Hook, Live & Sinker (Chesterbury, 2014)
