= Lou Reid =

American singer-songwriter

- Born: Louis Reid Pyrtle; September 13, 1954 (age 71); Union Grove, North Carolina
- Genres: Bluegrass music
- Occupation: Musician
- Instrument(s): Vocals, mandolin, guitar, bass guitar, banjo, violin
- Years active: 1973–present
- Labels: Rebel, Rural Rhythm, Sugar Hill Lonesome Day
- Website: loureidandcarolina.com

Louis Reid Pyrtle (born September 13, 1954) is an American bluegrass singer and musician, bandleader of The Seldom Scene.

== Biography ==
=== Early life ===
Reid grew up on a tobacco farm in Moore Springs, North Carolina. His father also worked as a construction supervisor. When Reid was a young boy his father took him to see Flatt & Scruggs, and Reid has loved bluegrass music ever since.

In his early teens, Reid played acoustic bass with the band Bluegrass Buddies, then joined the bluegrass group Southbound, who recorded one album for Rebel Records. He played banjo with them from 1973 to 1979. Other members included Jimmy Haley (guitar), Dennis Severt (mandolin), and Doug Campbell (bass).

=== Doyle Lawson and Quicksilver ===
In 1979, Lou joined Doyle Lawson and Quicksilver, playing bass guitar. Quicksilver consisted of Lawson (mandolin), Reid (bass), Terry Baucom (banjo), and Jimmy Haley (guitar). Reid recorded three albums with Quicksilver.

=== Ricky Skaggs Band ===
Reid was with the Ricky Skaggs Band from 1982 to 1986, playing a number of instruments and providing harmony vocals.

=== Seldom Scene ===
Reid replaced Phil Rosenthal as lead singer and guitarist for the Seldom Scene in 1986. Reid was a member of the Seldom Scene for six years, then left in 1993 for Nashville to tour with Vince Gill and Vern Gosdin.

When John Duffey died in 1996, Ben Eldridge brought Reid back to the Seldom Scene, while also continuing to perform and record with his band Carolina.

=== Longview ===
Reid joined the reunited bluegrass supergroup Longview in 2008 to record Deep in the Mountains. Other members included J. D. Crowe (banjo), Don Rigsby (mandolin), James King (vocals), Marshall Wilborn (bass), and Ron Stewart (fiddle).

=== Lou Reid and Carolina ===
In 1992, Lou Reid formed his band Carolina with lifelong friend Terry Baucom and Marcus Smith (bass).

Carolina's first album Carolina Blue was followed in 1995 by Carolina Moon. Then Baucom left the band to pursue his own career.

In 1996, Carolina released a third album Lou Reid & Carolina and in 2010 released Blue Heartache.

Christy Reid joined Carolina in 2002. She first joined as guitar player, and moved to bass in 2005.

It would be five years and a line-up change before Reid and Carolina's next release, Time, in 2005. Reid was joined this time by vocalist Christy Reid, guitarist Kevin Richardson, banjoist Trevor Watson, and bassist Joe Hannabach. Released on Lonesome Day Records, the album also featured a number of high-profile guest appearances, including Vince Gill, Ricky Skaggs, and Jerry Douglas.

=== Awards ===
In 1994, Lou Reid and Carolina received the International Bluegrass Music Association (IBMA) Emerging Artist of the Year award. In 1995, the album Carolina Moon was nominated for Album of the Year by the IBMA.

=== Personal life ===
Reid met his wife Christy in 2001 when she auditioned for Carolina as a bass player. She got the job, and three years later they were married. They have two daughters.

== Discography ==
=== Solo albums ===
- 1993: When It Rains (Sugar Hill)

=== Collaborations ===
- 1989: High Time (Sugar Hill) with Mike Auldridge and T. Michael Coleman

=== As a member of Southbound ===
- 1977: Southbound (Rebel)

=== As a member of Doyle Lawson and Quicksilver ===
- 1979: Doyle Lawson & Quicksilver (Sugar Hill)
- 1981: Rock My Soul (Sugar Hill)
- 1982: Quicksilver Rides Again (Sugar Hill)

=== As a member of the Ricky Skaggs Band ===
- 1983: Don't Cheat in Our Hometown – (Sugar Hill)
- 1984: Country Boy (Epic Nashville)
- 1985: Live in London (Epic Nashville)

=== As a member of The Seldom Scene ===
- 1988: 15th Anniversary Celebration (Sugar Hill)
- 1988: A Change of Scenery (Sugar Hill)
- 1990: Scenic Roots (Sugar Hill)
- 1991: Scene 20: 20th Anniversary Concert (Sugar Hill)
- 2000: Scene It All (Sugar Hill)
- 2007: Scenechronized (Sugar Hill)
- 2014: Long Time... Seldom Scene (Smithsonian Folkways)

=== As a member of Longview ===
- 2008: Deep in the Mountains (Rounder)

=== As a member of Lou Reid and Carolina ===
- 1993: Carolina Blue (Webco)
- 1994: Carolina Moon (Rebel)
- 1996: Lou Reid & Carolina (Rebel)
- 2000: Blue Heartache (Rebel)
- 2003: Carolina, I'm Coming Home (LRC)
- 2005: Time (Lonesome Day)
- 2009: My Own Set of Rules (Rural Rhythm)
- 2010: Sounds Like Heaven to Me (Rural Rhythm)
- 2012: Calling Me Back Home (KMA)
- 2016: 20th Anniversary: Live at the Down Home (KMA)
- 2016: Rollin' On (self-released)

=== Also appears on ===
- 1984: Vern Gosdin – If Jesus Comes Tomorrow (What Then) (Compleat)
- 1987: Paul Adkins – Appalachian Memories (Old Homestead)
- 1988: Virginia Squires – Variations (Rebel)
- 1989: Mike Auldridge – Treasures Untold (Sugar Hill)
- 1989: The Smith Sisters – Roadrunner (Flying Fish)
- 1990: Mike Auldridge – High Time (Sugar Hill)
- 1999: Scottie Sparks – Scottie Sparks (Doobie Shea)
- 2000: Ron Spears – My Time Has Come (Copper Creek)
- 2004: Darin Aldridge – Call It a Day (Pinecastle)
- 2007: Dwight McCall – Never Say Never Again (Rural Rhythm)
- 2011: Audie Blaylock and Redline - I'm Going Back to Old Kentucky: A Bill Monroe Celebration (Rural Rhythm)
