= Baptizing (album) =

Studio album by The Seldom Scene
- Released: 1978
- Recorded: 1978
- Genre: Bluegrass, progressive bluegrass
- Label: Rebel
- Producer: Gary B. Reid

The Seldom Scene chronology
| The New Seldom Scene Album (1976) | Baptizing (1978) | Act IV (1979) |

Professional ratings
Review scores
| Source | Rating |
|---|---|
| Allmusic | 3.5/5 stars |

Baptizing is an album by American progressive bluegrass band The Seldom Scene. It is marked as a last album for John Starling and arrival of new singer/guitarist Phil Rosenthal. It is also The Seldom Scene's last album recorded under Rebel Records, before switching to Sugar Hill Records .

== Track listing ==
1. "By the Side of the Road" (Albert E. Brumley) – 4:09
2. "Brother John" (Phil Rosenthal) – 3:04
3. "Dreaming of a Little Cabin" (Albert E. Brumley) – 3:54
4. "Fallen Leaves" (Louis M. Jones) – 3:22
5. "He Took Your Place" (Lester Flatt, Earl Scruggs) – 2:46
6. "Take Him In" (Phil Rosenthal) – 2:13
7. "Hobo on a Freight Train to Heaven" (Sam Weedman) – 2:39
8. "Will You Be Ready to Go Home?" (Hank Williams) – 2:34
9. "Were You There?" (Traditional; arranged by John Duffey) – 3:25
10. "Walk With Him Again" (Phil Rosenthal) – 2:49
11. "Gospel Medley" (Traditional; arranged by John Duffey) – 4:09

== Personnel ==
The Seldom Scene

- John Starling - vocals, guitar
- Phil Rosenthal - vocals, guitar
- John Duffey - mandolin, vocals
- Ben Eldridge - banjo, guitar, vocals
- Mike Auldridge - Dobro, guitar, vocals
- Tom Gray - bass, vocals

with:

- Ricky Skaggs - violin
