= Moondi Klein =

American singer & guitarist (born 1963)

- Born: March 13, 1963 (age 63); New York City, New York, U.S.
- Genres: Bluegrass music, Americana music
- Occupation: Musician
- Instruments: Guitar, vocals, piano
- Years active: 1981–present
- Website: jimmyandmoondi.com

Lawrence Parker "Moondi" Klein is an American singer and guitarist. He is known for his work with Chesapeake, The Seldom Scene, and Jimmy Gaudreau.

== Biography ==
=== Early life ===
Klein grew up in New York City. His father, Howard Klein, was a pianist and music critic for the New York Times, and his mother was an artist. Raised on opera, he (and his brother) sang with the New York Metropolitan Opera Children’s Chorus before he was age 10 until his mid-teens. When his father took him on a trip to southwest Virginia, Klein began to develop an interest in bluegrass music.

=== Early career ===
Klein's brother Adam Klein is an opera singer and a multi-instrumental folk musician. In 1981, Adam and Moondi recorded the album Me and My Brother.

After college in 1984, Klein relocated to the Washington D.C. area. He was a founding member of the DC area bluegrass group Rock Creek with Randy Barrett, then he replaced John Starling as lead singer for The Seldom Scene, staying with them from 1994 until 1996.

=== Chesapeake ===
Klein and Jimmy Gaudreau met in 1990 at a picking party. In 1992, they formed Chesapeake with Seldom Scene members Mike Auldridge (resonator guitar) and T. Michael Coleman (bass). At first a side project, the band eventually became a full-time occupation, and they recorded three albums for Sugar Hill. With no banjo, they were more acoustic country than bluegrass. Chesapeake disbanded in 1999 when their contract with Sugar Hill ended.

=== Jimmy Gaudreau and Moondi Klein ===
When Chesapeake split up, Klein took time off from touring to raise his young children, but eventually began to play the occasional show with Gaudreau. When they recorded their 2008 album 2:10 Train, thery decided to formalize the duo. This was followed by Home From the Mill and then If I Had A Boat, all released on Rebel Records. In 2008, Gaudreau and Klein toured with Emmylou Harris. Their focus is on relaxed improvisation and interplay.

== Discography ==
=== As Adam and Moondi Klein ===
- 1981: Me and My Brother (Zeng)

=== With Chesapeake ===
- 1994: Rising Tide (Sugar Hill)
- 1995: Full Sail (Sugar Hill)
- 1997: Pier Pressure (Sugar Hill)
- 2014: Hook, Live & Sinker (Chesterbury) compilation of live performances

=== As Jimmy Gaudreau and Moondi Klein ===
- 2008: 2:10 Train (Rebel)
- 2012: Home from the Mills (Rebel)
- 2014: If I Had a Boat (Rebel)

=== Also appears on ===
- 1992: Tony Furtado - Within Reach (Rounder)
- 1995: Doc Watson - Docabilly (Sugar Hill)
- 1997: Jonathan Edwards - Man in the Moon (Rising)
- 1997: Lisa Moscatiello - Innocent When You Dream (Happy Cactus)
- 1999: John McCutcheon - Storied Ground (Rounder)
- 2003: BanjerDan - Old Stuff (self-released)
- 2004: Lucie Blue Tremblay - It's Got to Be About Love (CD Baby)
- 2007: Candlewyck - Two (Votive)
- 2010: Frank Solivan and Dirty Kitchen – Frank Solivan and Dirty Kitchen (Fiddlemon)
- 2011: Jonathan Edwards - My Love Will Keep (Appleseed)
