= The New Seldom Scene Album =

Studio album by The Seldom Scene
- Released: 1976
- Recorded: 1976
- Studios: Bias Studios, Springfield, Virginia
- Genres: Bluegrass, progressive bluegrass
- Label: Rebel
- Producer: Gary B. Reid

The Seldom Scene chronology
Live At The Cellar Door (1975)	The New Seldom Scene Album (1976)	Baptizing (1978)

Professional ratings
Review scores
Source	Rating
AllMusic	3.5/5 stars

The New Seldom Scene Album is an album by American progressive bluegrass band The Seldom Scene.

== Track listing ==
1. "Big Rig" (Greg "Fingers" Taylor) 03:44
2. "If That's the Way You Feel" (Carter Stanley, Ralph Stanley) 02:59
3. "Easy Ride from Good Times to the Blues" (Herb Pedersen) 03:05
4. "Paradise Valley" (Traditional; arranged by Tom Gray) 03:19
5. "California Earthquake" (Rodney Crowell) 05:22
6. "Railroad Man" (Traditional; arranged by John Starling) 03:16
7. "Answer Your Call" (John Starling) 03:59
8. "I Haven't Got the Right to Love You" (Sam Buchanan, Vernon Claud) 02:38
9. "Song for the Life" (Rodney Crowell) 03:32
10. "Rebels Ye Rest" (Pauline Beauchamp) 02:34
11. "Pictures from Life's Other Side" (Traditional; arranged by John Duffey) 04:15

== Personnel ==
The Seldom Scene

- John Starling - vocals, guitar
- John Duffey - mandolin, vocals
- Ben Eldridge - banjo, lead guitar, vocals
- Mike Auldridge - Dobro, guitar, pedal steel guitar, vocals
- Tom Gray - bass, vocals

with:

- Linda Ronstadt - harmony vocals on "California Earthquake"
- Mark Cuff - drums, percussion
