= Act III (The Seldom Scene album) =

Studio album by The Seldom Scene
- Released: 1973
- Recorded: July 15 and 21, 1973
- Studios: ITI Recordings, Inc.
- Genres: Bluegrass, progressive bluegrass
- Label: Rebel
- Producer: Gary B. Reid

The Seldom Scene chronology
Act II (1973)	Act III (1973)	Old Train (1973)

Professional ratings
Review scores
Source	Rating
Allmusic	5/5 stars

Act III is the third album by American progressive bluegrass band The Seldom Scene. The album features the band in their "classic" lineup.

== Track listing ==
1. "Chim-Chim-Cher-Ee" (Richard M. Sherman, Robert B. Sherman) – 1:20
2. "Little Georgia Rose" (Bill Monroe) – 2:57
3. "Another Lonesome Day" (Wendy Thatcher) – 2:04
4. "Willie Boy" (Phil Rosenthal) – 2:57
5. "Faded Love" (Bob Wills, John Wills) – 2:04
6. "Rider" (Traditional; arranged by the Seldom Scene) – 5:23
7. "Muddy Water" (Phil Rosenthal) – 3:00
8. "Mean Mother Blues" (John Starling) – 3:00
9. "Sing Me Back Home" (Merle Haggard) – 2:56
10. "Hail to the Redskins" (Barnee Breeskin, Corinne Griffith) – 1:53
11. "Don't Bother with White Satin" (John Duffey, Ann Hill) – 2:55
12. "Heaven" (Boyd McSpadden, Helen McSpadden) – 2:56

== Personnel ==
The Seldom Scene

- John Starling – vocals, guitar
- John Duffey – mandolin, vocals
- Ben Eldridge – banjo, guitar, vocals
- Mike Auldridge – Dobro, guitar, vocals
- Tom Gray – bass, vocals

with:

- Ricky Skaggs – violin
- Clayton Hambrick – guitar
