= Act IV =

Act IV or Act Four may refer to:

- Act IV, music venue Music of Washington, D.C.
- Act Four (The Seldom Scene album)
- Act IV: Rebirth in Reprise, a 2015 album by the Dear Hunter
- Act. 4 Cait Sith, 2018 single album by Gugudan
- Tusk Act 4, a Stand of Johnny Joestar, the protagonist of Part 7 of the Japanese manga series JoJo's Bizarre Adventure
