= Scenic Roots =

Studio album by The Seldom Scene
- Released: 1990
- Recorded: 1990
- Genre: Bluegrass, progressive bluegrass
- Label: Sugar Hill
- Producer: The Seldom Scene

The Seldom Scene chronology
15th Anniversary Celebration (1986)	Scenic Roots (1990)	Scene 20: 20th Anniversary Concert (1992)

Professional ratings
Review scores
Source	Rating
Allmusic	3/5 stars

Scenic Roots is an album by American progressive bluegrassc band The Seldom Scene.

== Track listing ==
1. If You Ever Change Your Mind (Carl Jackson, Stuart) 02:07
2. Lots in a Memory (Wes Golding) 03:41
3. The Wrath of God (Delmore, Delmore) 02:34
4. Before I Met You (Lewis, Rader, Seitz) 03:13
5. Red Georgia Clay (Coleman, Pyrtle) 02:25
6. I've Cried My Last Tear over You (Delmore, Jackson) 02:57
7. Not in My Arms (Coleman, Pyrtle) 02:24
8. Highway of Heartache (Carl Jackson, Rushing) 03:17
9. Long Black Veil (Dill, Wilkin) 04:12
10. Last Call to Glory (Duffey) 02:38
11. Distant Train (Coleman, Pyrtle) 02:24
12. How Mountain Girls Can Love (Rakes) 02:06

== Personnel ==
- Lou Reid - vocals, guitar, mandolin
- John Duffey - mandolin, vocals
- Ben Eldridge - banjo, guitar, vocals
- Mike Auldridge - Dobro, guitar, vocals
- T. Michael Coleman - bass, vocals
