= Full Sail =

Full Sail may refer to:

== Music ==
- Full Sail (Chesapeake album), 1996
- Full Sail (Loggins and Messina album), 1973
- "Full Sail", a song by the Beach Boys from L.A. (Light Album), 1979

== Other uses ==
- Full Sail (horse) (1934–1953), a British Thoroughbred racehorse
- Full Sail Brewing Company, Hood River, Oregon, U.S.
- Full Sail University, Winter Park, Florida, U.S.

== See also ==
- Under Full Sail (Toutes voiles dehors), a volume of the comic-book series Quick & Flupke by Hergé
- Sail, a surface intended to generate thrust by being placed in a wind
- Sailing, the art of controlling a boat with sails
