= Act Four (The Seldom Scene album) =

Studio album by The Seldom Scene
- Released: 1979
- Recorded: 1979
- Genre: Bluegrass, progressive bluegrass
- Label: Sugar Hill
- Producer: Gary B. Reid

The Seldom Scene chronology
Baptizing (1978)	Act Four (1979)	After Midnight (1979)

Professional ratings
Review scores
Source	Rating
Allmusic	3.5/5 stars

Act Four is an album by American progressive bluegrass band The Seldom Scene, the first record under Sugar Hill Records and with a new lead singer/guitarist, Phil Rosenthal. He replaced John Starling, who left to concentrate on his career.

== Track listing ==
1. "Something in the Wind" (Phil Rosenthal, Beth Rosenthal) – 03:15
2. "Girl in the Night" (Hank Thompson) – 03:51
3. "Ride Me Down Easy" (Billy Joe Shaver) – 02:25
4. "Leaving Harlan" (Phil Rosenthal) – 03:00
5. "Tennessee Blues" (Bill Monroe) – 03:14
6. "Life Is Like a Mountain Railway" (Traditional; arranged by John Duffey and Mike Auldridge) – 03:37
7. "I Don't Know You" (Moreno, Black) – 02:38
8. "California Blues" (Jimmie Rodgers) – 03:53
9. "San Antonio Rose" (Bob Wills) – 02:29
10. "Daddy Was a Railroad Man" (Phil Rosenthal) – 02:29
11. "Walking the Blues" (Tom Gray) – 03:59
12. "This Weary Heart You Stole Away" (Carter Stanley) – 02:39

== Personnel ==
The Seldom Scene

- Phil Rosenthal – vocals, guitar
- John Duffey – mandolin, vocals
- Ben Eldridge – banjo, guitar, vocals
- Mike Auldridge – Dobro, guitar, vocals
- Tom Gray – bass, vocals
