= John Starling (musician) =

American bluegrass musician (1940–2019)

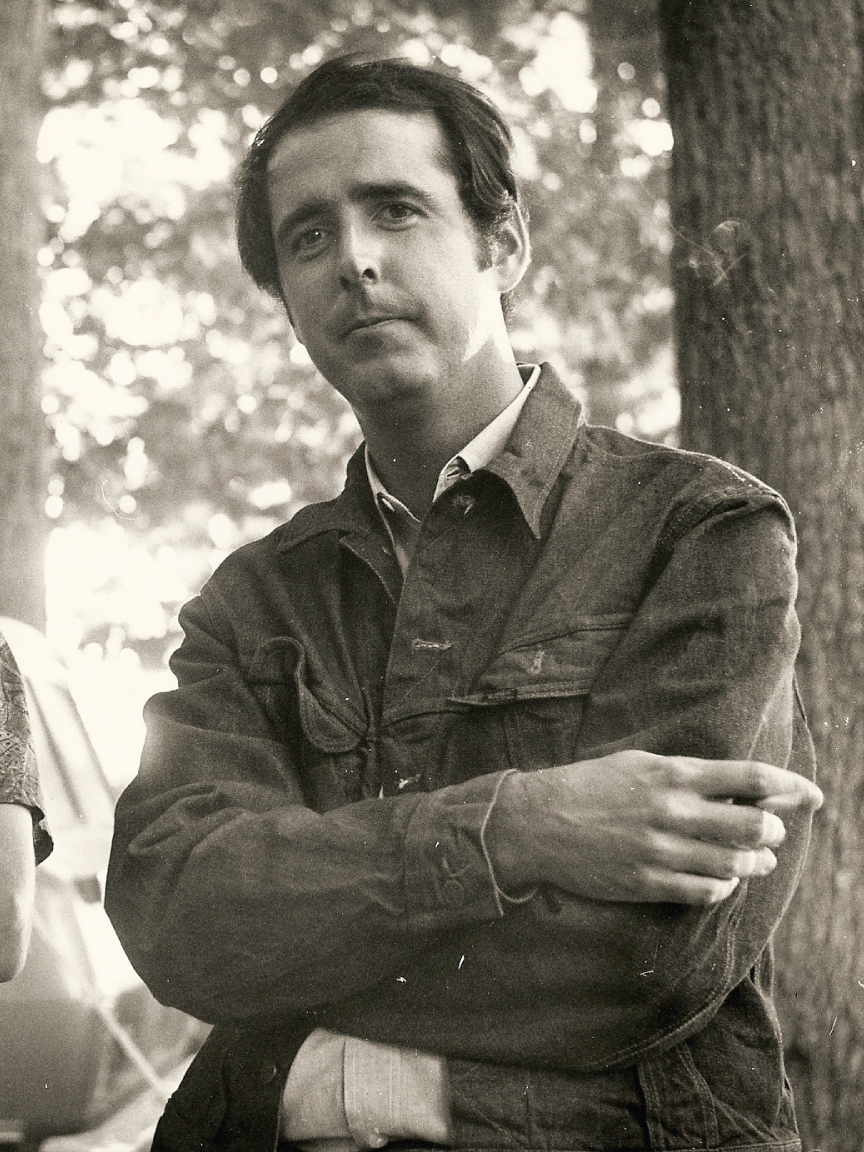
- John Starling of The Seldom Scene

Background information
- Born: John Lewis Starling; March 26, 1940; Durham, North Carolina, U.S.
- Died: May 2, 2019 (aged 79) Fredericksburg, Virginia, U.S.
- Genre: Bluegrass
- Occupations: Otolaryngologist, bluegrass musician
- Instrument: Guitar
- Years active: 1971–2007
- Labels: Sugar Hill, Rebel Records
- Formerly of: The Seldom Scene

John Lewis Starling (March 26, 1940 – May 2, 2019) was an American musician. He was an International Bluegrass Music Hall of Fame inductee bluegrass musician and composer, founding member of the bluegrass group The Seldom Scene, an otolaryngological physician for communities in Alabama, Washington, D.C., and Virginia, and an amateur architectural designer designing the field house at Virginia Military Institute, the house his parents retired in, and the floor plans for the building he practiced medicine in.

== Biography ==
John Starling was born in Durham, North Carolina, and grew up in Lexington, Virginia. His father was hired by Washington and Lee University as a biology professor. Starling discovered bluegrass and country through live radio programs, taking up the electric guitar during his teenage years. He graduated from McCallie School in Chattanooga, Tennessee, in 1958. He was a graduate of Davidson College, Class of 1962, and received his medical degree from the University of Virginia in 1967. While on campus, he attended folk and bluegrass jams and met future bandmate Ben Eldridge. After graduating he served in the U.S. Army as a surgeon during the Vietnam War.

Following his tour of duty, he did his residency at the Walter Reed Army Medical Center in Washington, D.C. In Washington, he met musician Mike Auldridge through former acquaintance Ben Eldridge. The three began making music together after work in Eldridge's basement during jam sessions and eventually were joined by two former members of the bluegrass band The Country Gentlemen, John Duffey and Tom Gray, as part of these weekly informal sessions. Soon, the five musicians formed The Seldom Scene and were part of the weekly line up at the Red Fox Inn in Bethesda, Maryland, and then The Birchmere Music Hall in Alexandria, Virginia. In 1977, Starling left the band, deciding to, in his words, "do what I was originally trying to do, which was practice medicine." In 1980 he released a solo album Long Time Gone with guest appearances from Emmylou Harris, Little Feat guitarist Lowell George, pedal steel guitarist Buddy Emmons and his former bandmates. With singer Claire Lynch, he formed a country-rock band, Ready Section.

His first marriage, to bluegrass singer Fayssoux Dunbar, ended in divorce. In 1976, he married Cynthia Burks. Survivors include his wife, of Fredericksburg, and son John "Jay" Starling, a dobro player residing in the Charlottesville, Virginia, area.

His recording Spring Training with banjoist/songwriter Carl Jackson and The Nash Ramblers won the 1992 Grammy for Best Bluegrass Album. He briefly rejoined The Seldom Scene in the mid-1990s to fill in following the departure of singer/guitarist Lou Reid, while continuing his medical practice. After his retirement from medicine in 2006, he reunited with Auldridge and Gray, along with Jimmie Gaudreau and Ricky Simpkins, as "John Starling and Carolina Star" for a final collaboration, Slidin' Home (2007). Starling took pride in what he termed "honesty in presentation" and considered it paramount to give an audience his best. "No matter how slick you are," he once said, "people aren’t going to buy it if you’re checking your watch to see how long you have before you go off.""

John Starling played his final show at Mount Airy farm in Warsaw, Virginia, on June 30, 2017, accompanied by his son Jay Starling on resonator guitar with friends Jesse Harper on acoustic guitar, Cameron Ralston on bass, Nat Smith on cello and Courtney Hartman on vocals and guitar. The nearly 60 minute set of music was a benefit for local stewards Friends of the Rappahannock. The last song performed that night (Paul Craft's "Keep Me From Blowing Away") was recorded from the soundboard and is available for free listening on Soundcloud. This recording remains as John's final goodbye to his fans, family and many friends.

On February 12, 2019, Starling was reported to be "seriously ill" and living in hospice care. He died of congestive heart failure on May 2, 2019, at his Fredericksburg, Virginia, home, at the age of 79.

== Awards ==
Starling shared the 1992 Grammy Award for Best Bluegrass Album with Carl Jackson for their album Spring Training.

== Discography ==
=== Solo albums ===
- 1980: Long Time Gone (Sugar Hill SH-3714)
- 1982: Waitin' on a Southern Train (Sugar Hill SH-3724)

=== As a member of The Seldom Scene ===
- 1972: Act I (Rebel REB-1511)
- 1973: Act II (Rebel REB-1520)
- 1973: Act III (Rebel REB-1528)
- 1974: Old Train (Rebel REB-1536)
- 1975: Live at The Cellar Door (Rebel REB-1547/8 live double album)
- 1976: The New Seldom Scene Album (Rebel REB-1561)
- 1978: Baptizing (Rebel||REB-1573)
- 1994: Like We Used to Be (Sugar Hill SH-3822)

=== With Carl Jackson ===
- 1991: Spring Training (Sugar Hill SH-3789)

=== As a member of John Starling and Carolina Star ===
- 2007: Slidin' Home (Rebel REB-CD-1820)

=== Other contributions ===
- 1974: Heart Like a Wheel (Linda Ronstadt album) backing vocalist
- 1975: Elite Hotel (Emmylou Harris album)– acoustic guitarist, backing vocalist
- 1977: California Autumn (Tony Rice album)– producer, mixer, guitar and vocal accompaninist
- 1987: Trio (Dolly Parton, Linda Ronstadt and Emmylou Harris album) – acoustic guitar accompanist and musical consultant
- 1994 (released 1999): Trio II – acoustic guitar
- 1995: Feels Like Home (Linda Ronstadt album) – backing vocalist
