= Pier Pressure (album) =

Studio album by Chesapeake
- Released: 1997
- Studio: Cue Recording Studios, Falls Church, Virginia
- Genre: Bluegrass, progressive bluegrass
- Length: 43:04
- Label: Sugar Hill
- Producer: Chesapeake

Chesapeake chronology
Full Sail (1996)	Pier Pressure (1997)

Professional ratings
Review scores
Source	Rating
Allmusic	4/5 stars

Pier Pressure is the third and final album by the progressive bluegrass band Chesapeake. It is marked by more original material by the group members - four songs by bassist Coleman as well as one by guitarist Klein.

== Track listing ==
1. "Once a Day" (T. Michael Coleman) 2:52
2. "Full Force Gale" (Morrison) 3:51
3. "Bed of Roses" (Benson, Gillette) 4:14
4. "Nothing Ain't a Lot" (T. Michael Coleman) 3:09
5. "Carolina Star" (Motfatt) 3:35
6. "Sleepwalk(ing) at the Drive-In" (Farina) 4:03
7. "Baby Blue Eyes" (Eanes) 3:39
8. "White PIlgrim" (Traditional) 2:54
9. "Guilty" (T. Michael Coleman) 2:57
10. "Rockin' Hillbilly" (T. Michael Coleman) 3:07
11. "Don't Lay Down" (Moondi Klein) 3:25
12. "Working on a Building" (Traditional) 5:18

== Personnel ==
- Moondi Klein - lead vocals, guitar, piano
- Mike Auldridge - Dobro, lap steel, pedal steel, guitar, vocals
- Jimmy Gaudreau - mandolin, guitar, vocals
- T. Michael Coleman - bass guitar, guitar, vocals

with

- Pat McInerney - percussion, drums
- Linda Ronstadt - vocals on "Bed of Roses"
