= Old Train =

Studio album by The Seldom Scene
- Released: 1974
- Recorded: 1974
- Genres: Bluegrass, progressive bluegrass
- Label: Rebel
- Producer: Gary B. Reid

The Seldom Scene chronology
Act III (1973)	Old Train (1974)	Live at The Cellar Door (1975)

Professional ratings
Review scores
Source	Rating
Allmusic	4/5 stars

Old Train is the fourth album by American progressive bluegrass band The Seldom Scene. The album offers the group in their original lineup and features their trademark songs "Wait a Minute", "Old Train" and "C & O Canal". The record is a mixture of progressive, traditional bluegrass and folk material and also features guest musicians as Ricky Skaggs on violin or Linda Ronstadt on vocals.

== Track listing ==
1. "Appalachian Rain" (Paul Craft) – 2:38
2. "Wait a Minute" (Herb Pedersen) – 3:31
3. "Different Roads" (John Starling) – 2:31
4. "Old Train" (Herb Pedersen, Nikki Pedersen) – 2:15
5. "Through the Bottom of the Glass" (Paul Craft) – 2:22
6. "Old Crossroads" (Traditional) – 3:08
7. "Pan American" (Williams) – 2:40
8. "Working on a Building" (Traditional) – 3:33
9. "Walk Through This World With Me" (Kaye Savage, Sandra Seamons) – 2:02
10. "Maybe You Will Change Your Mind" (Don Reno) – 2:32
11. "Traveling On and On" (Traditional) – 2:43
12. "C & O Canal" (John Starling) – 2:35

== Personnel ==
The Seldom Scene

- John Starling - vocals, guitar
- John Duffey - mandolin, vocals
- Ben Eldridge - banjo, guitar, vocals
- Mike Auldridge - Dobro, guitar, vocals
- Tom Gray - bass, vocals

with

- Ricky Skaggs - fiddle, viola
- Bob Williams - harmonica
- Paul Craft - guitar
- Linda Ronstadt - vocals

== Artwork ==
The cover art depicts a steam locomotive, with number 5303 clearly visible. Locomotive 5303 was a Baltimore and Ohio Railroad class P Locomotive (4-6-2) named President Madison, built in 1927 and retired in 1957.
