= International Bluegrass Music Hall of Fame =

Museum to honor bluegrass music

- Type: Music Association
- Genre: Bluegrass
- Founded: 1991
- Headquarters: 311 W 2nd St, Owensboro, KY 42301 Owensboro, Kentucky, United States
- Website: https://www.bluegrasshall.org/

For a professional in the bluegrass music field, election to the International Bluegrass Music Hall of Fame is the highest honor the genre can bestow. An invitation can be extended to performers, songwriters, promoters, broadcasters, musicians, and executives in recognition of their contributions to the development of bluegrass music worldwide. The hall of fame honor was created in 1991 by the International Bluegrass Music Association and the inductees are honored annually at the International Bluegrass Music Awards ceremony. The Hall's first inductees were Bill Monroe, widely considered as the founder of the genre, and Lester Flatt and Earl Scruggs, two of bluegrass music's most pioneering and influential artists. The most recent inductees (class of 2024) are Katy Daley, Jerry Douglas, and Alan Munde. The Hall itself is maintained at the Bluegrass Music Hall of Fame & Museum in Owensboro, Kentucky. The institution received its current name in 2007, and was known prior to this as the International Bluegrass Music Hall of Honor.

== Member selection ==
Each year a nominating committee creates a slate of 10-15 candidates. From these names, electors cast ballots to narrow the nominees to five finalists. There are over 200 electors who, themselves, must have participated actively in bluegrass for at least 10 years, and must merit respect and recognition for their accomplishments and/or knowledge in one or more aspects of the field. After the five finalists have been selected, the electors again vote to select the inductee(s) for that year. The name(s) of the newest Hall of Honor inductee(s) are made public immediately following the final stage of balloting and the formal induction takes place each year during the International Bluegrass Music Awards Show. The plaques are then displayed at the Bluegrass Music Hall of Fame & Museum in Owensboro, Kentucky.

=== Eligibility ===
Only people or performing groups are eligible for induction into the Hall of Fame. Companies, institutions, publications, radio stations, and other organizations – many of which significantly foster bluegrass music – are not eligible for Hall of Fame recognition. People are not eligible for induction in the year following their death. Eligible people and musical groups may include:

- Individuals such as performing artists, songwriters, music business executives, promoters, and broadcasters. It is permitted to include multiple individuals simultaneously under one induction when those individuals are part of an influential collaboration. Examples might include musical duos, songwriting partners, record label owners, or similar collaborations. Hall of Fame recognition is given to the individual(s).
- Performing groups that present exclusively as a “band,” without a named headlining personality. Hall of Fame recognition is given to the performing group as an entity, not to any of its individual members, and regardless of band configuration or time period.

=== Categories ===
The International Bluegrass Music Hall of Fame inducts its members in one of three categories:

- Open Category: Two inductions are selected annually for the Hall of Fame Open Category. Eligible candidates may be living or deceased and may include performing artists, bands, and industry professionals.
- Early Contributor Category: One induction is selected during odd-numbered years for the Hall of Fame Early Contributor Category. Eligible candidates may be living or deceased and should include performing artists, bands, and industry professionals who first came to prominence at least 50 years prior to the induction year.
- Non-Performer Category: One induction is selected during even-numbered years for the Hall of Fame Non-Performer Category. Eligible candidates may be living or deceased and should include those whose primary contributions to bluegrass music are apart from performing

=== Criteria ===
Candidates for the Hall of Fame are appraised by the Nominating Committee and Panel of Electors in accordance with the criteria below:

1. Basic Standard - Candidates should be judged according to their contribution to the advancement of bluegrass music and the indelibility of that impact.
2. Individuals Versus Performing Groups – Nomination of a performing band may take priority over its individual band members, unless the contributions of an individual band member to the greater whole of bluegrass music greatly overshadows the influence of the band. The Nominating Committee is encouraged to wait three years after a band induction before individual band members may be again eligible for the Hall of Fame. Exceptions may be made at the discretion of the Nominating Committee.
3. Scope of Activity - Candidates may have excelled in a specific sphere such as songwriting, publishing, performing, recording, or producing; or they may have been active in several areas. Regardless of their focus, candidates must have achieved definitive leadership in their field(s) and must compete with all candidates in all fields.
4. Span of Influence - The time factor of a candidate's impact on bluegrass music is completely flexible (except as provided for the Early Contributor Category). It may cover an uninterrupted span of many years or it may cover two or more distinct and separate time cycles. A candidate may earn Hall of Fame recognition by one transient act, momentary in time, providing the impact on bluegrass music is deemed significant enough. Longevity of involvement with bluegrass music, therefore, will not in itself warrant recognition in the Hall of Fame.
5. Influence on Others – Inspirational effect on others is a most significant criterion in evaluating candidates; the degree to which their influence is multiplied through others to create an impact on bluegrass music far beyond direct individual contribution

== Inductees ==
=== 1990s ===
1991

- Bill Monroe
- Earl Scruggs
- Lester Flatt

1992

- The Stanley Brothers
  - Ralph Stanley
  - Carter Stanley
- Reno and Smiley
  - Don Reno
  - Arthur Lee "Red" Smiley

1993

- Mac Wiseman
- Jim & Jesse
  - Jim McReynolds
  - Jesse McReynolds

1994

- Osborne Brothers
  - Bobby Osborne
  - Sonny Osborne

1995

- Jimmy Martin

1996

- Peter V. Kuykendall
- The Country Gentlemen
  - Charlie Waller
  - John Duffey
  - Eddie Adcock
  - Tom Gray

1997

- Josh Graves

1998

- Chubby Wise
- Carlton Haney

1999

- Kenny Baker

=== 2000s ===
2000

- Lance LeRoy
- Doc Watson

2001

- Carter Family
  - A. P. Carter
  - Sara Carter
  - Maybelle Carter

2002

- The Lilly Brothers & Don Stover
  - Michael Burt "Bea" Lilly
  - Charles E. "Everett" Lilly
  - Don Stover
- David Freeman

2003

- J. D. Crowe

2004

- John Ray "Curly" Seckler
- Bill Vernon

2005

- Red Allen
- Benny Martin

2006

- The Lewis Family
  - James Ray "Pop" Lewis
  - Blanche "Mom" Lewis
  - Nannie Lewis
  - James Wallace Lewis
  - Talmadge Lewis
  - Polly Lewis
  - Roy Lewis
  - Travis Lewis
  - Janis Lewis Phillips
  - Lewis Phillips
- Syd Nathan

2007

- Howard Watts ("Cedric Rainwater")
- Carl Story

2008

- Bill Clifton
- Charles Wolfe

2009

- Lonesome Pine Fiddlers
  - Charlie Cline
  - Curly Ray Cline
  - Ezra Cline
  - Melvin Goins
  - Paul Williams
- The Dillards
  - Doug Dillard
  - Rodney Dillard
  - Mitchell F. Jayne
  - Dean Webb

=== 2010s ===
Image	Inductee	Year	Birth date	Death date	Notes	Ref
	John Hartford	2010	December 30, 1937	June 4, 2001	Singer-songwriter, multi-instrumentalist, steamboat pilot	
	Louise Scruggs	2010	February 17, 1927	February 2, 2006	Talent manager, booking agent	
	Del McCoury	2011	February 1, 1939	–	Singer, guitarist, bandleader	
	George Shuffler	2011	April 11, 1925	April 7, 2014	Guitarist	
	Doyle Lawson	2012	April 20, 1944	–	Singer, bandleader	
	Ralph Rinzler	2012	July 20, 1934	July 2, 1994	Mandolinist, founder of Smithsonian Folklife Festival	
	Tony Rice	2013	June 8, 1951	December 25, 2020	Guitarist, songwriter	
	Paul Warren	2013	May 17, 1918	January 12, 1978	Fiddle player	
	Neil Rosenberg	2014	March 21, 1939	–	Author and music historian, banjo player	
	The Original Seldom Scene	2014	Mike Auldridge (December 30, 1938); John Duffey (March 4, 1934); Ben Eldridge (August 15, 1938); Tom Gray (February 1, 1941); John Starling (March 26, 1940)	December 29, 2012; December 10, 1996 – – May 2, 2019	Band	
	Larry Sparks	2015	September 25, 1947	–	Singer, guitarist	
	Bill Keith	2015	December 20, 1939	October 23, 2015	Banjo player	
	The Rounder Founders	2016	Ken Irwin (May 23, 1944); Marian Leighton Levy (August 22, 1948); Bill Nowlin (February 14, 1945)	–	Music executives, founders of Rounder Records	
	Clarence White	2016	June 7, 1944	July 15, 1973	Singer, guitarist, member of The Kentucky Colonels and The Byrds	
	Hazel Dickens and Alice Gerrard	2017	Dickens (June 1, 1925); Gerrard (July 8, 1934)	April 22, 2011 –	Musical duo	
	Bobby Hicks	2017	July 21, 1933	–	Musician	
	Roland White	2017	April 23, 1938	April 1, 2022	Mandolinist	
	Vassar Clements	2018	April 25, 1928	August 16, 2005	Fiddle player	
	Tom T. Hall and Dixie Hall	2018	Tom. T Hall (May 25, 1936); Dixie Hall (May 26, 1934)	August 20, 2021; January 16, 2015	Singer-songwriter and author Songwriter	
	Mike Seeger	2018	August 15, 1933	August 7, 2009	Musician	
	Allen Shelton	2018	July 2, 1936	November 21, 2009	Banjo player	
	Ricky Skaggs	2018	July 18, 1954	–	Singer-songwriter, multi-instrumentalist, producer, bandleader	
	Jake Tullock	2018	July 23, 1922	June 18, 1988	Bass player	
	Joe Val	2018	June 26, 1926	June 11, 1985	Musician and singer	
	Paul Williams	2018	March 30, 1935	–	Singer, musician	
	Terry Woodward	2018	July 19, 1937	–	Volunteer leader	
	Mike Auldridge	2019	December 30, 1938	December 29, 2012	Dobro player	
	Bill Emerson	2019	January 22, 1938	August 21, 2021	Banjo player	
	The Kentucky Colonels	2019	Roger Bush (September 16, 1940); Billy Ray Latham (January 12, 1938); LeRoy McNess (September 19, 1940); Clarence White (June 7, 1944); Eric White (July 9, 1942); Roland White (April 23, 1938)	– August 18, 2018 – July 5, 1973; June 7, 2012; April 1, 2022	Band	

=== 2020s ===
Image	Inductee	Year	Birth date	Death date	Notes	Ref
	Earl "J. T." Gray	2020	March 7, 1946	March 20, 2021	Owner of the Station Inn	
	Johnson Mountain Boys	2020	Dudley Connell (February 18, 1956); Francis "Frannie" Davidson (September 29, 1958); Richard Underwood (July 14, 1956); Raymond "Tom" Adams Jr. (November 17, 1958); David McLaughlin (February 13, 1958); Edward "Eddie" Z'Mura (November 30, 1955); Eddie Stubbs (November 25, 1961); Gary Reid (October 2, 1956); Mark Prindle (January 24, 1956); Larry Robbins (April 25, 1945); Marshall Wilborn (March 12, 1952); Hugh "Earl" Yeager (November 2, 1953)	–	Band	
	New Grass Revival	2020	Curtis Birch (January 24, 1945); Sam Bush (April 13, 1952); John Cowan (August 24, 1953); Béla Fleck (July 10, 1958); Pat Flynn (May 17, 1952); Courtney Johnson (December 20, 1939); Joseph "Butch" Robins (May 12, 1949); Ebo Walker (October 19, 1941)	– – – – – June 7, 1996 – –	Band	
	Alison Krauss	2021	July 23, 1971	–	Singer, fiddle player	
	Lynn Morris	2021	October 8, 1948	–	Musician	
	The Stoneman Family	2021	Ernest "Pop" Stoneman (May 25, 1893); Hattie Stoneman (September 28, 1899); Patsy Stoneman (May 25, 1925); Calvin Stoneman (August 4, 1932); Donna Stoneman (February 7, 1934); Oscar Stoneman (March 8, 1937); Veronica "Roni" Stoneman (May 5, 1938); Van Stoneman (December 31, 1940)	June 14, 1968; July 22, 1976; July 23, 2015; March 4, 1973 – September 22, 2002; February 22, 2024; June 3, 1995	Band	
	Norman Blake	2022	March 10, 1938	–	Multi-instrumentalist, singer-songwriter	
	Paul "Moon" Mullins	2022	September 24, 1936	August 3, 2001	Fiddle player	
	Peter Rowan	2022	July 4, 1942	–	Singer-songwriter, musician	
	Sam Bush	2023	April 13, 1952	–	Mandolinist, singer-songwriter	
	Wilma Lee Cooper	2023	February 7, 1921	September 13, 2011	Singer, musician	
	David Grisman	2023	March 23, 1945	–	Mandolinist, producer, songwriter, owner of Acoustic Disc records	
	Katy Daley	2024		–	Broadcaster, producer, voice-over at the IBMA Awards	
	Jerry Douglas	2024	May 28, 1956	–	Dobro and steel guitar player, producer, member of Union Station and The Earls of Leicester, co-director of Transatlantic Sessions	
	Alan Munde	2024	November 4, 1946	–	Banjo player, session musician, member of Country Gazette, music educator, author	
	Hot Rize	2025		–	Band	
	Bluegrass Cardinals	2025		-	Band	
	Arnold Shultz	2025	1886	1931	Fiddle and guitar player	
	Byron Berline	2026	July 6, 1944	July 10, 2021	Fiddle player	
	Nashville Bluegrass Band	2026			Band	
	The Lost and Found	2026			Band	
	Barry Poss	2026	September 7, 1945	May 13, 2025	Sugar Hill Records founder	

=== Multiple inductees ===
To date, there have been six artists who have been inducted into the Hall of Fame more than once:

Name	First	Year	Second	Year
John Duffey	The Country Gentlemen	1996	The Original Seldom Scene	2014
Tom Gray	The Country Gentlemen	1996	The Original Seldom Scene	2014
Mike Auldridge	The Original Seldom Scene	2014	Solo career	2019
Clarence White	Solo career	2016	The Kentucky Colonels	2019
Roland White	Solo career	2017	The Kentucky Colonels	2019
Sam Bush	New Grass Revival	2020	Solo career	2023

== See also ==
- List of music museums
