= Like We Used to Be =

Studio album by The Seldom Scene
- Released: 1994
- Recorded: 1994
- Genre: Bluegrass, progressive bluegrass
- Label: Sugar Hill
- Producer: The Seldom Scene

The Seldom Scene chronology
| Scenic Roots (1990) | Like We Used to Be (1994) | Dream Scene (1996) |

Professional ratings
Review scores
| Source | Rating |
|---|---|
| Allmusic | 3/5 stars |

Like We Used to Be is an album by American progressive bluegrass band The Seldom Scene It's a group reunion with their original singer/guitarist, John Starling. He recorded only this album and decided to continue concentrating on his career as ear, nose & throat physician.

== Track listing ==
1. Grandpa Get Your Guitar (McCullough, Jim Rushing) 02:54
2. Let Me Be Your Friend (Carter Stanley) 02:45
3. Like I Used to Do (Pat Alger, Tim O'Brien) 04:06
4. Highway of Pain (Dauphin) 03:46
5. Cheap Whiskey (Emory Gordy Jr., Jim Rushing) 03:46
6. Philadelphia Lawyer (Woody Guthrie) 03:26
7. Almost Threw Your Love Away (Germino, Hylton) 03:56
8. The Other Side of Town (Clark, Williams, Williams) 02:59
9. She's More to Be Pitied (Rakes) 03:01
10. Heaven's Green Fields (Jim Rushing, Shamblin) 02:49
11. I've Come to Take You Home (Coleman, Duffey) 03:09
12. I'll Remember You Love in My Prayers (Hayes) 03:04
13. Some Morning Soon (Lynch, Lynch) 03:36

== Personnel ==
- John Starling - vocals, guitar
- John Duffey - mandolin, vocals
- Ben Eldridge - banjo, guitar, vocals
- Mike Auldridge - Dobro, guitar, vocals
- T. Michael Coleman - bass, vocals

with Pat McInerney - percussion, drums
