= 15th Anniversary Celebration =

Live album by The Seldom Scene
- Released: 1986
- Recorded: 1986
- Genre: Bluegrass, progressive bluegrass
- Label: Sugar Hill
- Producer: Bill McElroy

The Seldom Scene chronology
| Blue Ridge (1985) | 15th Anniversary Celebration (1986) | The Best Of The Seldom Scene (1987) |

Professional ratings
Review scores
| Source | Rating |
|---|---|
| Allmusic | 4.5/5 stars |

15th Anniversary Celebration is a live album by American progressive bluegrass band The Seldom Scene. This was the last album for bassist Tom Gray, who left to pursue his own music and was replaced by T. Michael Coleman .

== Track listing ==
| No. | Title | Writer(s) | Length |
|---|---|---|---|
| 1. | "Sitting on Top of the World" | Burnett, Chatmon, Dylan | 3:40 |
| 2. | "Big Train (From Memphis)" (Live) | Fogerty | 2:52 |
| 3. | "Lorena" | Auldridge, Duffey, trad | 3:42 |
| 4. | "Dark as a Dungeon" (Live) | Travis | 3:52 |
| 5. | "Blue Ridge" | Artis, Mallis | 3:45 |
| 6. | "Raised by the Railroad Line" | Craft | 3:18 |
| 7. | "You Don't Know My Mind" (Live) | Skinner | 2:54 |
| 8. | "Drifting Too Far from the Shore" (Live) | Traditional | 3:29 |
| 9. | "Those Memories of You" (Live) | O'Bryant | 3:46 |
| 10. | "Keep Me from Blowing Away" (Live) | Craft | 3:14 |
| 11. | "Wheels" | Hart, Hillman, Parsons | 3:13 |
| 12. | "Carolyn at the Broken Wheel Inn" | McDill, Rushing | 3:16 |
| 13. | "If I Needed You" | VanZandt | 3:21 |
| 14. | "Rose of Old Kentucky" | Monroe | 2:57 |
| 15. | "I Couldn't Find My Walking Shoes" | Brown, Overstreet | 4:04 |
| 16. | "Working on a Building" | Seldom Scene, Traditional | 4:51 |
| 17. | "Say You Lied" | Smith | 2:32 |
| 18. | "High on a Hilltop" | Collins | 3:29 |
| 19. | "The Sweetest Gift" | Coats | 2:51 |
| 20. | "Take Me in Your Lifeboat" | Traditional | 2:58 |

== Personnel ==
- Lou Reid – vocals, guitar
- John Duffey – mandolin, vocals
- Ben Eldridge – banjo, guitar, vocals
- Mike Auldridge – Dobro, guitar, vocals
- Tom Gray – bass, vocals

with

- John Starling – vocals, guitar
- Ricky Skaggs – violin, mandolin
- Paul Craft – guitar, vocals
- Stuart Duncan – violin
- Jonathan Edwards – guitar, vocals
- Emmylou Harris – guitar, vocals
- Bobby Hicks – violin
- Alan O'Bryant – banjo
- Lou Reid – violin, guitar, bass
- Tony Rice – guitar, vocals
- Linda Ronstadt -vocals
- Charlie Waller – guitar, vocals
- Sharon White
- Robbie Magruder – drums
