= Full Sail (Chesapeake album) =

Studio album by Chesapeake
- Released: 1996
- Studio: Bias Studios, Springfield, Virginia; Cue Recording Studios, Falls Church, Virginia
- Genre: Bluegrass; Progressive bluegrass
- Length: 39:38
- Label: Sugar Hill Records
- Producer: Chesapeake

Chesapeake chronology
Rising Tide (1994)	Full Sail (1996)	Pier Pressure (1997)

Professional ratings
Review scores
Source	Rating
Allmusic	3/5 stars

Full Sail is a second album by the progressive bluegrass band Chesapeake. The band combines folk, pop and country music on this album and most of the tracks include also drums, played by Pat McInerney.

== Track listing ==
1. "Home from the Mills" (Paul Mellyn) 2:47
2. "Are You Tired of Me, My Darling?" (A.P. Carter) 3:28
3. "Sweet Melinda" (Steve Gillette) 2:30
4. "Rain and Snow" (Traditional) 3:00
5. "Last Train from Poor Valley" (Norman Blake) 4:57
6. "One Way Track" (Wes Golding, Ricky Skaggs) 3:00
7. "The Lights of Home" (Randy Barrett, Béla Fleck) 4:06
8. "Let It Roll" (Paul Barrere, Bill Payne, Martin Kibbee) 4:33
9. "The Last Thing on My Mind" (Tom Paxton) 3:00
10. "Free at Heart" (Tim O'Brien) 3:13
11. "Crawfishin'" (J. Emerson, W.B. Emerson) 5:04

== Personnel ==
- Moondi Klein - lead vocals, guitar, piano
- Mike Auldridge - Dobro, lap steel, pedal steel, guitar, vocals
- Jimmy Gaudreau - mandolin, guitar, vocals
- T. Michael Coleman - bass guitar, guitar, vocals

with

- Pat McInerney - percussion, drums
