= Docabilly =

Studio album by Doc Watson
- Released: 1995
- Recorded: Champagne Studios, Nashville, TN
- Genre: Rockabilly
- Length: 35:53
- Label: Sugar Hill
- Producer: T. Michael Coleman

Doc Watson chronology
Original Folkways Recordings: 1960–1962 (1994)	Docabilly (1995)	The Vanguard Years (1995)

Docabilly is an album by American folk music artist Doc Watson, released in 1995.

Guests include Duane Eddy and Marty Stuart.

== Reception ==
Professional ratings
Review scores
Source	Rating
Allmusic	3/5 stars

Writing for Allmusic, music critic Mark Allan wrote of the album "...this album delivers some joyous, rollicking rockabilly, mixing early rock & roll classics with some country comforts. Although his singing strains a bit on the slow numbers, this American treasure comes through in grand style on the upbeat tunes."

== Track listing ==
1. "Shake, Rattle & Roll" (Charles E. Calhoun) – 3:04
2. "Walking After Midnight" (Alan Block, Don Hecht) – 3:18
3. "Heartbreak Hotel" (Mae Boren Axton, Thomas Durden, Elvis Presley) – 2:14
4. "My Special Angel" (Jimmy Duncan) – 2:54
5. "That's Why I Love You Like I Do" (Jack Marrow) – 2:33
6. "What Am I Living For?" (Art Harris, Fred Jacobson) – 4:07
7. "Bird Dog" (Felice Bryant, Boudleaux Bryant) – 3:48
8. "Little Things Mean a Lot" (Edith Calisch, Carl Stutz) – 3:00
9. "Train of Love" (Johnny Cash) – 2:20
10. "Thunder Road/Sugarfoot Rag" (Hank Garland, Vaughn Horton, Mitchum, Raye) – 2:24
11. "Love Is a Lonely Street" (Ella Barrett, Faye Cunningham) – 3:15
12. "Singing the Blues" (Melvin Endsley) – 2:56

== Personnel ==
- Doc Watson – guitar, vocals
- Jack Lawrence – guitar
- T. Michael Coleman – bass
- Junior Brown – steel guitar
- Mike Auldridge – guitar, lap steel guitar
- Duane Eddy – guitar
- Roy M. "Junior" Huskey – bass
- Larry Knechtel – piano
- Alan O'Bryant – harmony vocals
- Moondi Klein – harmony vocals
- Marty Stuart – mandolin, guitar
- Pat McInerney – drums

Production notes

- Produced by T. Michael Coleman
- Engineered by Randy Best
- Mixed by T. Michael Coleman, Bill Wolf
- Mastered by David Glasser, Bill Wolf
- Design by Bob Murray
