= Louise Scruggs =

American music manager (1927–2006)

- Born: Louise Certain; February 17, 1927; Grant, Tennessee
- Died: February 2, 2006 (aged 78); Nashville, Tennessee
- Occupation: Music manager
- Awards: International Bluegrass Music Hall of Fame (2010)

Louise Scruggs (née Certain 17 February 1927 — 2 February 2006) was an American music manager and booking agent. Scruggs became the first woman manager in the music industry when she started managing American bluegrass band Flatt and Scruggs in 1955. She was posthumously awarded the Joe Talbot Award in 2006 and inducted into the International Bluegrass Music Hall of Fame in 2010.

== Early life ==
Scruggs was born on 17 February 1927 in Grant, Tennessee.

== Career ==
Upon completing her high school education, Scruggs started her career as a bookkeeper in 1945. In 1955, Scruggs was the first woman manager in the music industry when she became the manager and booking agent of Flatt & Scruggs. As booking agent, she booked her husband Earl Scruggs to perform at the 1959 Newport Folk Festival. As manager, she worked on the Flatt & Scruggs's albums Songs of the Famous Carter Family and Folk Songs of Our Land while promoting the band. Her career with Flatt & Scruggs ended after the band broke up in 1969. Afterwards, she became the manager of the newly formed bluegrass band Earl Scruggs Revue.

== Death ==
Scruggs died on 2 February 2006 in Nashville, Tennessee from respiratory disease.

== Awards and honors ==
Shortly after her death, Scruggs was awarded the Joe Talbot Award by the Country Music Association in 2006. The following year, the Country Music Hall of Fame and Museum created the Louise Scruggs Memorial Forum award in 2007. Scruggs was inducted posthumously into the International Bluegrass Music Hall of Fame in 2010.

== Personal life ==
Louise and Earl Scruggs were married and had three children together.
