= Jaime Brockett =

American singer-songwriter

Jaime Brockett is a New England–based folk singer. He enjoyed cult status in the 1969-early 1970s era.

In the mid-to-late 1960s, he was a regular performer at many Boston, Massachusetts, clubs and coffeehouses, including the White Whale, Beverly, MA; Damaged Angel and Quest, Boston, MA; and Club 47, Cambridge, Massachusetts.

On his debut album, Remember the Wind and the Rain, he plays guitar, banjo, and dulcimer. Brockett was a favorite of devotees of late night progressive rock FM radio stations, particularly with his thirteen-minute-long adaptation of Lead Belly's (via Blind Lemon Jefferson) "The Titanic", rechristened The Legend of the U.S.S. Titanic, co-written with Chris Smither.

Brockett has released several albums over his career, including North Mountain Velvet, which has guest appearances by Ramblin' Jack Elliott and all of the members of The Seldom Scene.

Brockett has lived in New Hampshire, Massachusetts, Colorado, Wyoming, Towanda Pennsylvania, and Ohio, among other places. While in Ohio, he supplemented his performance and recording income by teaching guitar. Also while in Ohio, he opened at a local club for folk musician Tom Paxton. Members of the audience included Arlo Guthrie (who was to do a benefit for Friends of the Homeless the next day) and then-governor Dick Celeste.

A long-time friend of fellow musician Maria Muldaur, Brockett has also helped manage her career.

In March 2012, The Altamont Enterprise & Albany County Post reported in a letter to the editor from John Elberfeld of Knox, New York that Mr. Brockett attended high school in the "early sixties at Westboro, MA High School". The letter goes on to state that his album, "Remember the Wind and the Rain" "got major airplay" and was "headed for gold." It also referenced that Jaime "played for packed college auditoriums and toured the world". This contributor remembers several performances at Union and Skidmore Colleges from 1972 to 1974.

Brockett played the Union College Coffeehouse on the evening of 15 April 1972. When he was initially reluctant to perform his version of Titanic, coffeehouse proprietor Becky Grant showed him a newspaper clipping, that it was in fact the 60th anniversary of the sinking of the famous ship. He relented, and gave a vigorous rendition of the song, lasting at least one-half hour.

The Enterprise also noted that as of 15 March 2012, Jaime Brockett was starting a "solo comeback tour" in Altamont, New York.

== Discography ==
- Remember the Wind and the Rain – 1968, Oracle Records
- Remember the Wind and the Rain – 1969, Capitol Records
- Jaime Brockett 2 – 1970, Capitol Records
- North Mountain Velvet – 1977, Adelphi Records
- Road Dancer – 1993, Sunset Ridge Recordings
