= Paul Williams (bluegrass musician) =

American bluegrass and gospel musician

"Big" Paul Williams (born Paul Humphrey, March 30th, 1935) is an American bluegrass and gospel musician. He took the surname Williams when he began his musical career in the early 1950s. He was guitarist and lead singer for the Lonesome Pine Fiddlers before replacing Earl Taylor in the Sunny Mountain Boys in 1957, playing mandolin and being featured regularly as a lead singer.

He played with Jimmy Martin at the height of the Sunny Mountain Boys' career, recording steadily through 1962 and at times competing for popularity with Elvis Presley. Williams is said to have helped shape Martin's sound. He was present in the recording process for what Martin has said were the "biggest selling records I've ever done." Williams co-wrote the perennially popular hit "Hold Whatcha Got."

During Williams' career he wrote many bluegrass songs. Songs such as Mr. Engineer, My Walkin' Shoes Don’t Fit Me Anymore, Steppin' Stones, Hold Whatcha Got, Don't Cry To Me, Prayer Bells Of Heaven, I Like To Hear 'Em Preach It and My Brown Eyed Darling.

Williams left from Jimmy Martin and the Sunny Mountain Boys in 1962. He married Jimmy Martin's half-sister who told him that "he couldn't play bluegrass music and live for the Lord." He went on to play gospel music with the Northside Quartet and later on achieved some success and a Grammy nomination with the Victory Trio, based out of his hometown of Morristown, Tennessee.

Williams started his own band the Victory Trio in 1995 with banjo player Jerry Keys, bass player Susie Keys along with Dan Moneyhun and Adam Winstead. His band has always been considered a vessel to spread the Christian faith for Williams.

Shortly after retiring from touring with the victory trio Williams teamed up again with bluegrass legends J.D. Crowe and Doyle Lawson and recorded a series of albums full of original Jimmy Martin songs, some of which Williams helped write.

In 2018, Williams was inducted into the International Bluegrass Music Hall of Fame.

== Bibliography ==
- Donaghey, Bob (1999) Bluegrass Yearbook: Your Favorite Bluegrass Festival Performers, p. 3-4, ISBN 0-9670721-0-7 .
- Willis, Barry R. & Dick Weissman (1989) America's Music: Bluegrass: A history of bluegrass music in the words of its pioneers, p. 162, 217, 268, 272, 458, 519, ISBN 0-9652407-0-3 .
- Rice, Wayne (1999) Bluegrass Bios: Profiles of the Stars of Bluegrass, p. 118
- Rice, Wayne (2002) Bluegrass Bios: Profiles of the Stars of Bluegrass, p. 137
- Lawless, John. "Paul Williams Hangs up His Walkin' Shoes." Bluegrass Today, December 13, 2016. https://bluegrasstoday.com/paul-williams-hangs-up-his-walkin-shoes/.
- Thompson, Richard. "On This Day #37 - Paul Williams." Bluegrass Today, December 13, 2016. https://bluegrasstoday.com/on-this-day-37-paul-williams/.
- Thompson, Richard. "Don't Give Your Heart to a Rambler – Barbara Martin Stephens." Bluegrass Today, August 9, 2018. https://bluegrasstoday.com/dont-give-your-heart-to-a-rambler-barbara-martin-stephens/.
