= The Seldom Scene =

American bluegrass band

- Origin: Bethesda, Maryland, United States
- Genres: Bluegrass; country; Progressive bluegrass
- Years active: 1971–present
- Labels: Rebel, Sugar Hill, Smithsonian Folkways, Rounder
- Members: Lou Reid; Ron Stewart; Ronnie Simpkins; Fred Travers; Clay Hess
- Past members: John Duffey; Mike Auldridge; Ben Eldridge; Tom Gray; John Starling; Phil Rosenthal; T. Michael Coleman; Moondi Klein; Rickie Simpkins; Dudley Connell
- Website: seldomscene.com

The Seldom Scene is an American bluegrass band that formed in 1971 in Bethesda, Maryland. The band's original lineup comprised John Starling on lead vocals and guitar, Mike Auldridge on dobro and baritone vocals, Ben Eldridge on banjo, Tom Gray on double bass, and John Duffey on mandolin; the latter three also provided backing vocals. Together, they released their debut studio album, Act I, in 1972, followed by both Act II and Act III in 1973.

In 1977, Starling left the group and was replaced by singer-songwriter Phil Rosenthal. Starling and Rosenthal shared lead vocals on the group's sixth studio album, Baptizing, released in 1978. Around the same time, the group switched labels from Rebel Records to Sugar Hill Records. In 1986, Rosenthal and Gray left the band and were replaced by Lou Reid and T. Michael Coleman, respectively; Reid and Coleman first appeared on the band's 1988 album A Change of Scenery. Reid left the band in 1992, and Starling briefly returned to the group, performing on their 1994 album Like We Used to Be. Starling was replaced by Moondi Klein as the band's lead singer.

During 1995 and 1996, Klein, Coleman, and Auldridge left the Seldom Scene to form a new band called Chesapeake. Duffey and Eldridge recruited guitarist Fred Travers, bassist Ronnie Simpkins, and guitarist and singer Dudley Connell into the Seldom Scene, and together released the album Dream Scene in 1996. That same year, Duffey died of a heart attack. Reid returned to the band to replace Duffey on mandolin, and the group released the album Scene It All in 2000. The group's 2007 album Scenechronized was nominated for a Grammy Award for Best Bluegrass Album. The band's original members (Auldridge, Duffey, Eldridge, Gray, and Starling) were inducted into the International Bluegrass Music Hall of Fame in 2014.

== History ==
=== Formation and early career (1971) ===
The Seldom Scene was established in 1971, and they would practice in Ben Eldridge's basement. These practice sessions included John Starling on guitar and lead vocals, Mike Auldridge on Dobro and baritone vocals, and former Country Gentlemen member Tom Gray on bass. The mandolinist John Duffey, who had also performed with the Country Gentlemen, was invited to jam sessions at the time when Mike Auldridge arranged for the group to play as a performing band. Another member of the Country Gentlemen, Charlie Waller, is responsible for the band's name. Expressing his doubt that this new band could succeed, Waller reportedly asked Duffey, "What are you going to call yourselves, the seldom seen?" The band had weekly performances at clubs and performed regularly at the Red Fox Inn, a music club in Bethesda Maryland. The band switched over to the Birchmere music hall in Alexandria, Virginia, which resulted in a residency.

=== Members' backgrounds ===
Each of the band members had a job during the week; Duffey repaired musical instruments, Eldridge was a mathematician, Starling a physician, Auldridge a graphic artist, and Gray a cartographer with National Geographic. They agreed to play one night a week at local clubs, perform occasionally at concerts and festivals on weekends, and make records. After playing for six weeks at a small Washington, DC, club called the Rabbit's Foot, the group found a home at the Red Fox Inn in Bethesda, Maryland. They performed at that venue Friday nights from January 1972 through September 1977 before starting weekly performances at the Birchmere music hall.

=== Rise to popularity (1972–1976) ===
The progressive bluegrass style played by the Seldom Scene had become increasingly popular during the 1970s, especially Duffey's high tenor and the vocal blend of Duffey/Starling/Auldridge. Their weekly shows included bluegrass versions of country music, rock, and even classical pop. The band's popularity soon forced them to play more than once a week, but they continued to maintain their image as being seldom seen, and on several of their early album covers were photographed with the stage lights on only their feet, or with their backs to the camera. Though the Scene remained a non-touring band, they were prolific recorders, producing seven albums in their first five years of existence, including one live album (among the first live bluegrass albums).

=== John Starling's departure and Phil Rosenthal as lead singer (1977–1986) ===
In 1977, John Starling left the group to focus on his medical career, and was replaced by singer and songwriter Phil Rosenthal, whose song "Muddy Water" had been recorded by the Scene on two earlier albums. Starling and Rosenthal shared their lead vocals on the group's sixth studio album, Baptizing (recorded in 1978). Around the same time, the group switched record labels from Rebel to Sugar Hill. Starling recorded a solo album for Sugar Hill in 1980 called "Long Time Gone" and another in 1982 called "Waitin' On a Southern Train", on both of which Mike Auldridge played.

The lineup of Rosenthal-Duffey-Gray-Auldridge-Eldridge recorded five albums of a comparable popularity to the ones with the founding members, including John Starling. Rosenthal proved to be as good lead singer as Starling and his baritone voice contrasted well with Duffey's high tenor extravaganzas. He also wrote typically two to three songs on each of the albums and also added acoustic guitar solos to the group.

=== More changes in lineup (1986–1996) ===
In 1986, Phil Rosenthal and Tom Gray both left the band to focus on other pursuits, and were replaced by Lou Reid and T. Michael Coleman, respectively. Coleman proved to be very controversial, as many purists objected to his use of an electric bass in what is nominally an acoustic genre, but the albums produced by the band after Coleman's arrival maintained the traditional appeal of any of the Scene's earlier albums.

Reid left the band in 1992, and Duffey convinced former member John Starling to return to the band for the next year. During that year the Scene recorded the album Like We Used to Be, but Starling did not wish to stay with the band long term. He was replaced in 1994 by lead singer Moondi Klein.

Throughout these changes, band leader John Duffey's original plan of keeping a light touring schedule and staying close to home continued to prevail. During 1995 and 1996, Klein and Coleman, along with original member Mike Auldridge, wanting to be part of a full-time project, left the Seldom Scene to form a new band called Chesapeake. For a time the Scene stopped recording.

Duffey and Eldridge, the two remaining original members, recruited resophonic guitar player Fred Travers, bassist Ronnie Simpkins, and guitarist and singer Dudley Connell to join the band, and the reconstituted group recorded an album in 1996 and continued live appearances.

=== John Duffey's death, return of Lou Reid, and Scene It All (2000–2006) ===
In late 1996, band leader and founder John Duffey suffered a fatal heart attack.

Banjoist Ben Eldridge, the sole remaining original member of the Seldom Scene, assumed leadership of the band. Former guitarist Lou Reid rejoined the band, replacing Duffey on mandolin. Initially the new Scene concentrated on live performances, but in 2000 the group recorded a new album, Scene It All. The Seldom Scene continues to tour, and has recorded for the Sugar Hill Records and Smithsonian Folkways labels.

=== Scenechronized, Long Time... Seldom Scene, and Changes (2007–present) ===
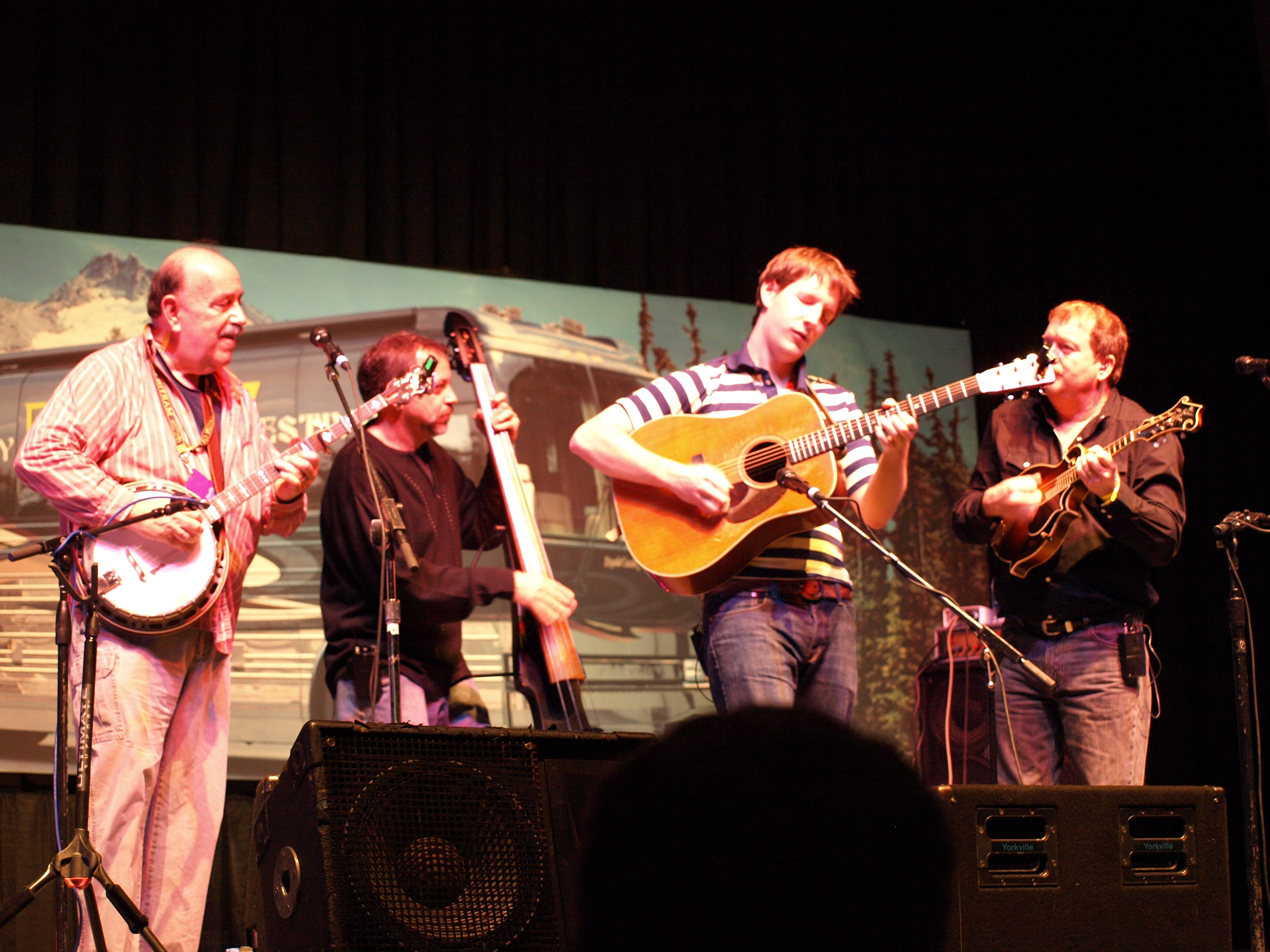
Seldom Scene playing at the Rivercity Bluegrass Festival in 2008.

Seldom Scene continues to perform and has received critical acclaim for their work. Scenechronized, recorded in 2007, was nominated for a Grammy Award for Best Bluegrass Album.

In July 2008, Seldom Scene performed at a White House dinner honoring the 2008 U.S. Olympic team as well as previous U.S. Olympians. Seldom Scene also played the National Folk Festival July 11–13, 2008, representing bluegrass music.

On April 22, 2014, the band returned with Long Time... Seldom Scene, via Smithsonian Folkways. The collection features interpretations of 16 oft-requested tunes and is the band's first studio album since the Scenechronized in 2007. In 2015, "Long Time...Seldom Scene" and "Mean Mother Blues" won awards in the "Bluegrass" Album and Song categories at The 14th Annual Independent Music Awards.

In January 2016, Ben Eldridge retired after 44 continuous years with the band. He was replaced by Rickie Simpkins.

In 2017, Ron Stewart joined the Seldom Scene, replacing Rickie Simpkins.

In 2019, the Seldom Scene released the album Changes, featuring songs by songwriters of the 1960s and early 1970s, through Rounder Records.

The band currently consists of Clay Hess (guitar/lead vocals), Ron Stewart (banjo/fiddle/guitar), Lou Reid (mandolin/tenor vocals), Fred Travers (dobro/lead vocals), and Ronnie Simpkins (bass/baritone vocals). Ben Eldridge's son, Chris, also frequently performs with the group.

== Personnel ==
=== Members ===
Current members

- Lou Reid – mandolin, guitar, vocals (1986–1993, 1996–present)
- Clay Hess - guitar, vocals (2024–present)
- Ronnie Simpkins – bass (1995–present)
- Fred Travers – Dobro, vocals (1995–present)
- Ron Stewart – banjo, fiddle (2017–present)

Former members

- John Duffey – mandolin, vocals (1971–1996; died 1996)
- Mike Auldridge – Dobro, vocals (1971–1995; died 2012)
- Tom Gray – bass (1971–1986)
- John Starling – guitar, vocals (1971–1978, 1993–1994; died 2019)
- Ben Eldridge – banjo, guitar (1971–2016; died 2024)
- Phil Rosenthal – guitar, vocals (1977-1986)
- T. Michael Coleman – bass (1986–1995)
- Moondi Klein – guitar, vocals (1994–1995)
- Rickie Simpkins – banjo, fiddle, guitar (2016–2017)
- Dudley Connell – guitar, vocals (1995–2024)

=== Lineups ===
1971–1977	1977–1978	1978–1986	1986–1993
Mike Auldridge – Dobro, vocals; John Duffey – mandolin, vocals; Ben Eldridge – banjo, guitar; Tom Gray – bass; John Starling – guitar, vocals	Mike Auldridge – Dobro, vocals; John Duffey – mandolin, vocals; Ben Eldridge – banjo, guitar; Tom Gray – bass; John Starling – guitar, vocals; Phil Rosenthal – guitar, vocals	Mike Auldridge – Dobro, vocals; John Duffey – mandolin, vocals; Ben Eldridge – banjo, guitar; Tom Gray – bass; Phil Rosenthal – guitar, vocals	Mike Auldridge – Dobro, vocals; John Duffey – mandolin, vocals; Ben Eldridge – banjo, guitar; T. Michael Coleman – bass; Lou Reid – guitar, vocals
1993–1994	1994–1995	1995–1996	1996–2015
Mike Auldridge – Dobro, vocals; John Duffey – mandolin, vocals; Ben Eldridge – banjo, guitar; T. Michael Coleman – bass; John Starling – guitar, vocals	Mike Auldridge – Dobro, vocals; John Duffey – mandolin, vocals; Ben Eldridge – banjo, guitar; T. Michael Coleman – bass; Moondi Klein – guitar, vocals	John Duffey – mandolin, vocals; Ben Eldridge – banjo, guitar; Dudley Connell – guitar, vocals; Ronnie Simpkins – bass; Fred Travers – Dobro, vocals	Ben Eldridge – banjo, guitar; Dudley Connell – guitar, vocals; Ronnie Simpkins – bass; Fred Travers – Dobro, vocals; Lou Reid – mandolin, guitar, vocals
2016–2017	2017–2024	2024–present
Dudley Connell – guitar, vocals; Ronnie Simpkins – bass; Rickie Simpkins – banjo, fiddle, guitar; Fred Travers – Dobro, vocals; Lou Reid – mandolin, guitar, vocals	Dudley Connell – guitar, vocals; Ronnie Simpkins – bass; Ron Stewart – banjo, fiddle; Fred Travers – Dobro, vocals; Lou Reid – mandolin, guitar, vocals	Clay Hess – guitar, vocals; Ronnie Simpkins – bass; Ron Stewart – banjo, fiddle; Fred Travers – Dobro, vocals; Lou Reid – mandolin, guitar, vocals

== Discography ==
Year	Title	Label	Number	Notes
1972	Act I	Rebel	REB-1511	
1973	Act II	Rebel	REB-1520	
1973	Act III	Rebel	REB-1528	
1974	Old Train	Rebel	REB-1536	
1975	Live at The Cellar Door	Rebel	REB-1547/8	live double album
1976	The New Seldom Scene Album	Rebel	REB-1561	
1978	Baptizing	Rebel	REB-1573	
1979	Act Four	Sugar Hill	SH-3709	
1981	After Midnight	Sugar Hill	SH-3721	
1983	At the Scene	Sugar Hill	SH-3736	
1985	Blue Ridge	Sugar Hill	SH-3747	with Jonathan Edwards
1987	The Best of The Seldom Scene, Vol. 1	Rebel	REB-1101	compilation from 1972–74
1988	15th Anniversary Celebration	Sugar Hill	SH-2202	live double album
1988	A Change of Scenery	Sugar Hill	SH-3763	
1990	Scenic Roots	Sugar Hill	SH-3785	
1992	Scene 20: 20th Anniversary Concert	Sugar Hill	SH-2501/02	live double album
1994	Like We Used to Be	Sugar Hill	SH-3822	
1996	Dream Scene	Sugar Hill	SH-3858	
2000	Scene It All	Sugar Hill	SUG-3899	
2007	Scenechronized	Sugar Hill	SUG-4003	
2007	Different Roads	Rebel	REB-7516	compilation from 1973–76
2014	Long Time... Seldom Scene	Smithsonian Folkways	SFW40199	
2019	Changes	Rounder	1166100485	
2025	Remains To Be Scene	Smithsonian Folkways	SFW40248	
