= Tom Gray (bluegrass musician) =

American musician (born 1941)

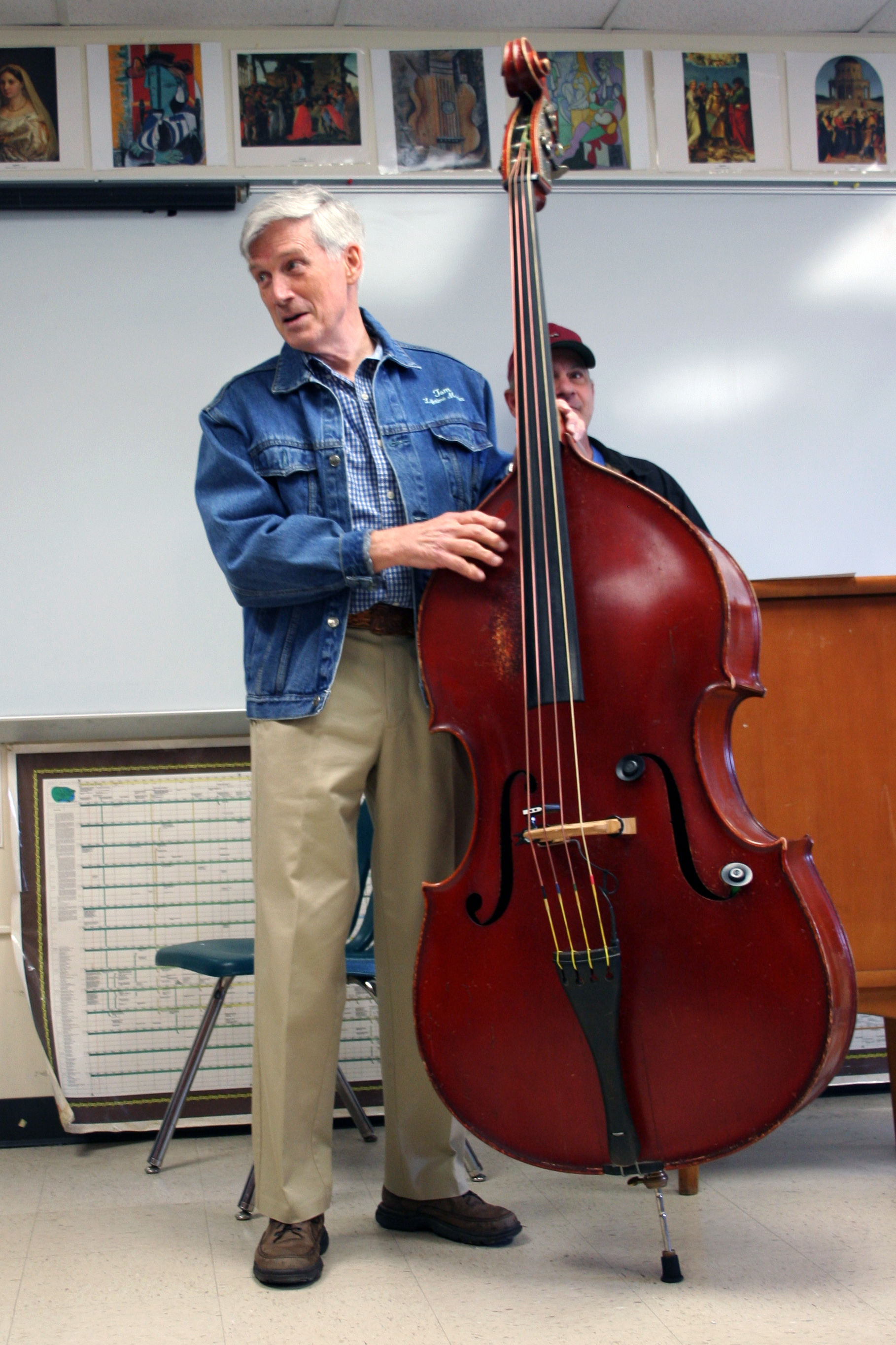
- Tom Gray teaching at the DC Bass Strummit in McLean, VA.

Background information
- Born: February 1, 1941 (age 85); Chicago, Illinois, United States
- Genre: Bluegrass music
- Occupations: Musician, songwriter
- Instrument: Bass

Tom Gray (born February 1, 1941, in Chicago, Illinois) is a bluegrass musician widely considered one of the best bass players in the genre. He is best known for his bass playing with The Country Gentlemen and The Seldom Scene. In 1996, as a member of The Country Gentlemen, he was inducted into the International Bluegrass Music Hall of Honor.

== Discography ==
=== As a member of The Country Gentlemen ===
- 1961: Folk Songs & Bluegrass (Folkways)
- 1962: Bluegrass at Carnegie Hall (Starday)
- 1963: On the Road (Folkways)
- 1963: Hootenanny (Design)
- 1963: Folk Session Inside (Design)
- 1964: Nashville Jail (Copper Creek) released 1990
- 1989: Classic Country Gents Reunion (Sugar Hill)

=== As a member of The Seldom Scene ===
- 1972: Act I (Rebel)
- 1973: Act 2 (Rebel)
- 1973: Act III (Rebel)
- 1974: Old Train (Rebel)
- 1975: Live at The Cellar Door (Rebel)
- 1976: The New Seldom Scene Album (Rebel)
- 1978: Baptizing (Rebel)
- 1979: Act Four (Sugar Hill)
- 1981: After Midnight (Sugar Hill)
- 1983: At the Scene (Sugar Hill)
- 1985: Blue Ridge (Sugar Hill) with Jonathan Edwards
- 1986: 15th Anniversary Celebration (Sugar Hill)
- 2014: Long Time...Seldom Scene (Smithsonian Folkways)

=== Also appears on ===
- 1968: Emerson and Waldron - New Shades of Grass (Rebel)
- 1972: Mike Auldridge - Dobro (Takoma)
- 1973: Jim Eanes and the New World Bluegrass Band - The New World Of Bluegrass (Folly)
- 1974: Mike Auldridge - Blues And Blue Grass (Takoma)
- 1974: Charlie Cline - Country Dobro (Adelphi)
- 1974: The Country Grass - Livin' Free (Rebel)
- 1975: Bill Clifton - Going Back To Dixie (Bear Family)
- 1975: Mike O'Roark and the Free Born Men - Pickin' With Feelin' (King Bluegrass)
- 1975: Tony Rice - California Autumn (Rebel)
- 1975: Ricky Skaggs - That's It (Rebel)
- 1976: Bill Keith - Something Auld, Something Newgrass, Something Borrowed, Something Bluegrass (Rounder)
- 1976: Bill Clifton And Red Rector - Another Happy Day (County)
- 1977: Jimmy Arnold - Guitar (Rebel)
- 1977: Bryan Bowers - The View From Home (Flying Fish)
- 1977: Jaime Brockett - North Mountain Velvet (Adelphi)
- 1978: Jerry Stuart and the Green Valley Ramblers - Rocky Run (County)
- 1978: Fred Geiger - Fred Geiger (Ridge Runner)
- 1980: Bryan Bowers - Home, Home On The Road (Flying Fish)
- 1980: The Ladies Choice Bluegrass Band - First Choice (Boot)
- 1980: Peter Rowan - Medicine Trail (Flying Fish)
- 1980: John Starling - Long Time Gone (Sugar Hill)
- 1982: Mike Auldridge - Eight String Swing (Sugar Hill)
- 1983: John McCutcheon - Howjadoo (Rounder)
- 1983: Phil Rosenthal - A Matter of Time (Sierra Records)
- 1988: Paul Adkins and the Borderline Band - Lay It On The Line (Old Homestead)
- 1989: Bill Emerson and Pete Goble - Dixie In My Eye (Webco)
- 1994: Mike Seeger - Third Annual Farewell Reunion (Rounder)
- 2007: John Starling and Carolina Star - Slidin' Home (Rebel)
