= Ben Eldridge =

American banjo player (1938–2024)

Ben Eldridge (August 15, 1938 – April 14, 2024) was an American five-string banjo player and a founding member of the bluegrass group The Seldom Scene. He fell in love with hillbilly music as a child listening to the Old Dominion Barn Dance on the radio. The show was broadcast from the Lyric Theater in downtown Richmond. Ben's mother Polly would take him to the concerts and he got to know top acts in country music, hanging out in the green room between shows.

== Biography ==
Ben Eldridge was born in Richmond, Virginia on August 15, 1938. He began playing the guitar at age ten and later in 1954 the banjo. In 1957, he began his studies at the University of Virginia at Charlottesville. Four years later he moved to Adelphi, Maryland. Earl Scruggs was Ben's first great influence. In the early 1960s Eldridge became acquainted with Bill Keith and Bill Emerson, who were to become two major banjo picking influences in his life. He was also a fan of Vick Jordan and Alan Shelton. Ben's style included Scruggs, melodic and chromatic techniques.

In June 1970, Eldridge joined "Cliff Waldron and the New Shades of Grass". Eldridge was among five musicians who started playing in the fall of 1971 with mandolinist John Duffey, Dobro player Mike Auldridge, bassist Tom Gray and guitar and lead singer John Starling. They would ultimately be known as The Seldom Scene.

Eldridge played on every Seldom Scene album up until, and including Long Time... Seldom Scene in 2014, and his discography includes 55 albums. Eldridge contributed to solo albums by Mike Auldridge and Phil Rosenthal, and he and other members of The Seldom Scene backed Linda Ronstadt in a few numbers on her early, more country-flavored albums.

Eldridge was inducted into the Bluegrass Music Hall of Fame in 2014.

Eldridge, the last original member of the Seldom Scene, announced his retirement January 15, 2016, after 44 years with the band. He died April 14, 2024, at the age of 85. Ben Eldridge is the father of Chris Eldridge of Punch Brothers.

Ben Eldridge is the grandfather of San Francisco Giants prospect Bryce Eldridge.
