= John Duffey =

American musician (1934–1996)

- Born: John Humbird Duffey Jr. March 4, 1934; Washington, D.C., US
- Died: December 10, 1996 (aged 62) Arlington County, Virginia, US
- Genres: Bluegrass
- Occupation: Musician
- Instruments: Vocals, mandolin, dobro, guitar
- Years active: 1957–1996
- Labels: Starday, Sugar Hill Records, Rebel Records, Folkways, Mercury

John Humbird Duffey Jr. (March 4, 1934 – December 10, 1996) was an American bluegrass musician.

== Biography ==
Duffey was born on March 4, 1934, in Washington, D.C., and lived nearly all his life in the Washington D.C. area. He graduated from Bethesda-Chevy Chase High School in suburban Maryland. Duffey learned to play the mandolin, dobro, and guitar, in addition to his tenor singing voice. He founded two of the most influential groups in bluegrass, The Country Gentlemen and The Seldom Scene. His tastes and sources were eclectic, often raiding folk song books and Protestant hymnals for material. He embraced the music of Bob Dylan and his style of playing was rock and jazz-inflected. In the late 1950s and the 1960s, he also increasingly began working as a session musician to supplement his income.

The son of a singer at the Metropolitan Opera, Duffey's singing ranged from tenor to falsetto, and was in contrast to the voice of baritone singer Charlie Waller.

Duffey started playing guitar at age 17 after a neighbor convinced him to pick up the instrument. In 1957, he worked at radio station WFMD in Frederick, Maryland partnered with Charlie Waller to fill in for other musicians. That duo eventually became the Country Gentlemen. As a member of the Country Gentlemen, Duffey was inducted into the International Bluegrass Music Hall of Honor in 1996.

Two months after his induction to the International Bluegrass Music Hall of Honor, Duffey was hospitalized in Arlington, Virginia after complaining of chest pains. The next morning, he died after suffering a heart attack.

A biography, John Duffey's Bluegrass Life: Featuring the Country Gentlemen, Seldom Scene, and Washington, DC, by Stephen Moore and G. T. Keplinger, Foreword by Tom Gray, was published in 2019 (Booklocker).
