= Mike Auldridge =

American bluegrass musician (1938–2012)

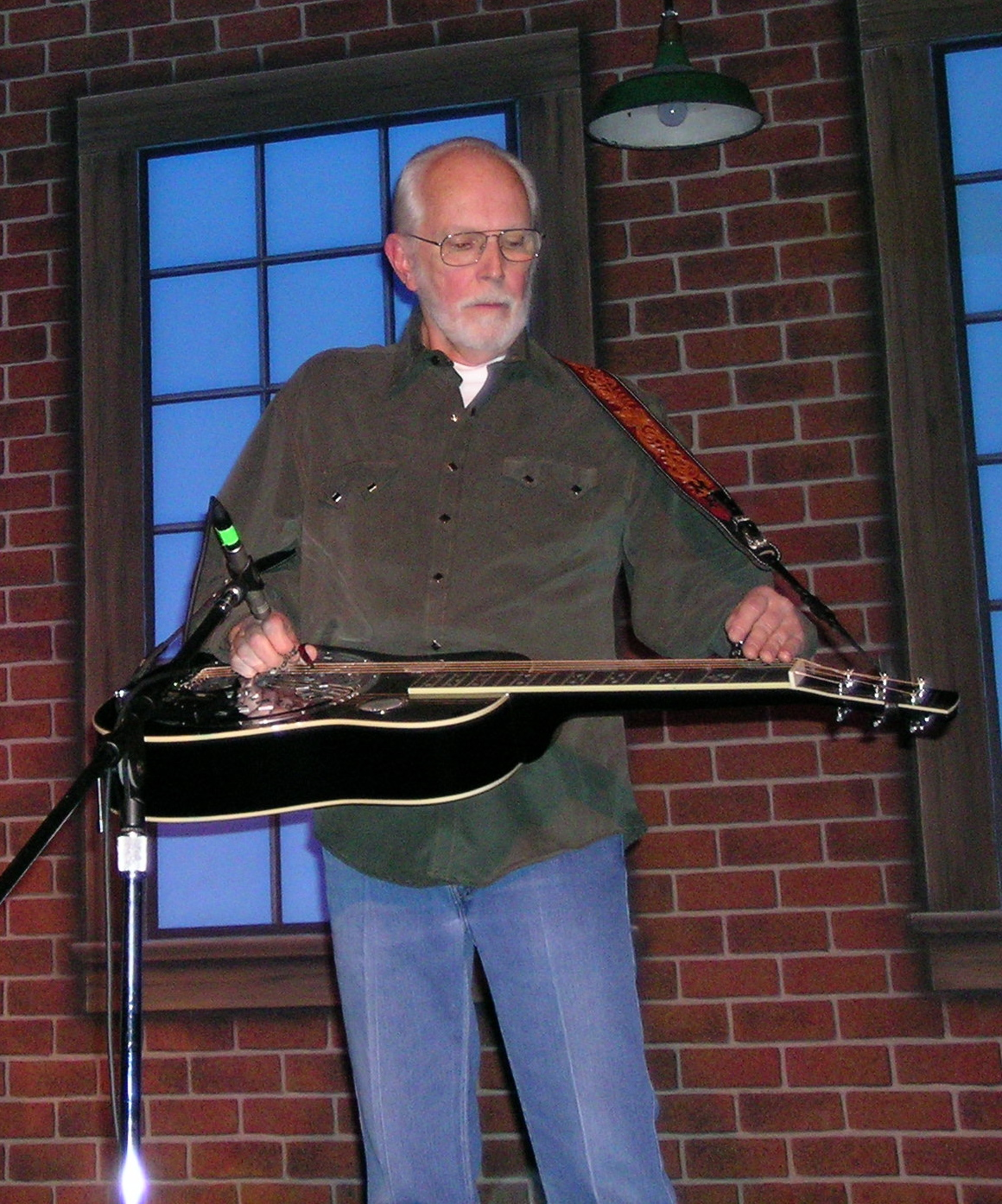
- Auldridge at The Birchmere, December 2006

Background information
- Born: December 30, 1938; Washington, DC, U.S.
- Died: December 29, 2012 (aged 73) Silver Spring, Maryland, U.S.
- Genres: Bluegrass, country, instrumental
- Instruments: Dobro, vocals
- Years active: 1960s–2012 (death)

Mike Auldridge (December 30, 1938 – December 29, 2012) was an American dobro player and a founding member of the bluegrass group the Seldom Scene. The New York Times described Auldridge as "one of the most distinctive dobro players in the history of country and bluegrass music while widening its popularity among urban audiences". He also worked as a graphic artist.

Auldridge is one of the few artists to have been inducted into the International Bluegrass Music Hall of Fame twice, in 2014 as a member of the Seldom Scene and again in 2019 as a solo artist.

== Biography ==
Auldridge was born in Washington, DC, United States, and grew up in the suburban town of Kensington, Maryland. He attended Wheaton High School, and while in his teens, took classes at the Corcoran College of the Arts and Design. Inspired by his uncle, steel guitarist Ellsworth T. Cozzens who had performed with Jimmie Rodgers during the 1920s, Auldridge started playing guitar at the age of 13. His main influence through his early years was Josh Graves, who also sold him his first dobro. A 1967 graduate of the University of Maryland, Auldridge worked as a graphic artist for a commercial art firm in Bethesda, Maryland, and then for the now-defunct Washington Star-News. He did not start playing music full-time until the Washington Star-News folded in 1981.

Auldridge last played with Darren Beachley and the Legends of the Potomac bluegrass band. Past bands include the Country Gentlemen, Emerson and Waldron, Cliff Waldron and the New Shades of Grass, the Seldom Scene (of which he was a founding member), Chesapeake, the Good Deale Bluegrass Band, and John Starling and Carolina Star (which featured three original members of the Seldom Scene). Auldridge was also a member of the touring bands of Lyle Lovett and Emmylou Harris.

He worked with Paul Beard (Beard Guitars) to produce the Beard Mike Auldridge Models of square-neck resophonic guitars (dobro), including an 8-string version.

Auldridge died on December 29, 2012, at his home under hospice care in Silver Spring, Maryland, after a lengthy battle with prostate cancer. He was 73.

== Awards ==
Auldridge was nominated for four Grammy Awards, including twice for Best Bluegrass Album with the Seldom Scene, in 1992 and 1994. He won numerous awards including Frets Magazine's "Dobro Player of the Year" and the International Bluegrass Music Association's Distinguished Achievement Award. He was a recipient of the 2012 National Heritage Fellowship awarded by the National Endowment for the Arts, which is the United States government's highest honor in the folk and traditional arts.
