= Country Gentlemen discography =

The Country Gentlemen discography
- Studio albums: 28
- Live albums: 4
- Compilation albums: 9

This article presents the discography of bluegrass band The Country Gentlemen.

== Studio albums ==
- Country Songs, Old and New (Folkways, 1960, Smithsonian Folkways, 1991)
- Folk Songs & Bluegrass (Folkways, 1961, Smithsonian Folkways, 1991)
- Bluegrass at Carnegie Hall (Starday, 1962)
- Hootenanny (Design, 1963)
- Folk Session Inside (Mercury, 1963)
- Bringing Mary Home (Rebel, 1966)
- Traveler And Other Favorites (Rebel, 1968)
- Play It Like It Is (Rebel, 1969)
- New Look, New Sound (Rebel, 1970)
- One Wide River To Cross (Rebel, 1971)
- Sound Off (Rebel, 1971)
- The Award Winning Country Gentlemen (Rebel, 1972)
- The Country Gentlemen (Vanguard, 1973)
- Remembrances & Forecasts (Vanguard, 1974)
- Joe's Last Train (Rebel, 1976)
- Calling My Children Home (Rebel, 1978)
- Sit Down, Young Stranger (Sugar Hill, 1980)
- River Bottom (Sugar Hill, 1981)
- Good As Gold (Sugar Hill, 1983)
- Return Engagement (Rebel, 1988)
- Classic Country Gents Reunion (Sugar Hill, 1989)
- Nashville Jail (Mercury, 1963, unreleased; Copper Creek, 1990)
- New Horizon (Rebel, 1992)
- Souvenirs (Rebel, 1995)
- Crying In the Chapel (Freeland, 2001)
- 45 Years of Memories (Pinecastle, 2002)
- Songs Of The American Spirit (Pinecastle, 2004)

== Live albums ==
- On the Road (Folkways, 1963, Smithsonian Folkways, 2001)
- Live From The Stage Of The Roanoake Bluegrass Festival (1967)
- Live In Japan (Seven Seas, 1970)
- Going Back To The Blue Ridge Mountains (Folkways, 1973)

== Compilation albums ==
- The Best of the Early Country Gentlemen (1971)
- Yesterday & Today Volume 1 (Rebel, 1973)
- Yesterday & Today Volume 2 (Rebel, 1973)
- Yesterday & Today Volume 3 (Rebel, 1974)
- 25 Years (Rebel, 1980)
- The Country Gentlemen feat. Ricky Skaggs (Vanguard, 1987)
- Let The Light Shine Down (Rebel, 1991)
- Sugar Hill Collection (Sugar Hill, 1995)
- Early Rebel Recordings: 1962-1971 {Box Set} (Rebel, 1998)
- High Lonesome (Starday, 1998)
- Complete Vanguard Recordings (Vanguard, 2002)

== Chronological discography ==
- Country Songs, Old and New (Folkways, 1960, Smithsonian Folkways, 1991)
- Folk Songs & Bluegrass (Folkways, 1961)
- Bluegrass at Carnegie Hall (Starday, 1962)
- On the Road (Folkways, 1963, Smithsonian Folkways, 2001)
- Hootenanny (Design, 1963)
- Folk Session Inside (Mercury, 1963)
- Bringing Mary Home (Rebel, 1966)
- Live From The Stage Of The Roanoake Bluegrass Festival (1967)
- Traveler And Other Favorites (Rebel, 1968)
- Play It Like It Is (Rebel, 1969)
- New Look, New Sound (Rebel, 1970)
- Live In Japan (Seven Seas, 1970)
- The Best of the Early Country Gentlemen (1971)
- One Wide River To Cross (Rebel, 1971)
- Sound Off (Rebel, 1971)
- The Award Winning Country Gentlemen (Rebel, 1972)
- Going Back To The Blue Ridge Mountains (Folkways, 1973)
- The Country Gentlemen (Vanguard, 1973)
- Yesterday & Today Volume 1 (Rebel, 1973)
- Yesterday & Today Volume 2 (Rebel, 1973)
- Yesterday & Today Volume 3 (Rebel, 1974)
- Remembrances & Forecasts (Vanguard, 1974)
- Joe's Last Train (Rebel, 1976)
- Calling My Children Home (Rebel, 1978)
- 25 Years (Rebel, 1980)
- Sit Down, Young Stranger (Sugar Hill, 1980)
- River Bottom (Sugar Hill, 1981)
- Good As Gold (Sugar Hill, 1983)
- The Country Gentlemen feat. Ricky Skaggs (Vanguard, 1987)
- Return Engagement (Rebel, 1988)
- Classic Country Gents Reunion (Sugar Hill, 1989)
- Nashville Jail (Copper Creek, 1990)
- Let The Light Shine Down (Rebel, 1991)
- New Horizon (Rebel, 1992)
- Sugar Hill Collection (Sugar Hill, 1995)
- Souvenirs (Rebel, 1995)
- Early Rebel Recordings: 1962-1971 {Box Set} (Rebel, 1998)
- High Lonesome (Starday, 1998)
- Crying In the Chapel (Freeland, 2001)
- Complete Vanguard Recordings (Vanguard, 2002)
- 45 Years of Memories (Pinecastle, 2002)
- Songs Of The American Spirit (Pinecastle, 2004)
