= Yesterday & Today Volume 3 =

1974 compilation album by The Country Gentlemen

Compilation album by The Country Gentlemen
- Released: 1974
- Recorded: 1961–1971
- Genre: Progressive bluegrass
- Length: 39:13
- Label: Rebel
- Producer: Charles R. Freeland

The Country Gentlemen compilation chronology
Yesterday & Today Volume 2 (1973)	Yesterday & Today Volume 3 (1974)	25 Years (1982)

Yesterday & Today Volume 3 is a compilation album by American progressive bluegrass band the Country Gentlemen. Released in 1974 by Rebel Records, it features twelve recordings from between 1961 and 1971 that had not previously been released in the US, including six live tracks (two from Live in Japan. The album is the third in a trilogy of compilations under the same name, preceded by Yesterday & Today Volume 1 Yesterday & Today Volume 2 in 1973.

== Track listing ==
Yesterday & Today Volume 3 track listing
No.	Title	Writer(s)	Recording date	Length
1.	"Train 45" (live)	Traditional, arr. Charlie Waller, Bill Emerson, Bill Yates and Doyle Lawson	January 18, 1971	2:32
2.	"White Rose"	John Duffey	November 17, 1962	3:36
3.	"Pretty Polly"	Larry Sparks	July 18, 1963	4:42
4.	"Silence or Tears"	Gray	November 6, 1961	2:40
5.	"Make Me a Pallet on the Floor"	Traditional	April 14, 1963	3:10
6.	"Hank Snow Medley" (live)	Hank Snow, arr. Waller	January 18, 1971	3:36
7.	"Galveston Flood"	Tom Rush; Duffey	September 27, 1963	2:59
8.	"M.T.A."	Jacqueline Steiner; Bess Lomax Hawes	August 21, 1963	3:56
9.	"These Men of God"	Duffey	November 17, 1962	2:36
10.	"Sunrise"	Sparks	August 21, 1963	3:18
11.	"They Call the Wind Maria"	Alan Jay Lerner; Frederick Loewe	March 1, 1970	2:55
12.	"Heaven"	Boyd McSpadden	September 3, 1967	3:13
Total length:				39:13

== Personnel ==
- Charlie Waller — guitar, lead vocals (tracks 2, 4, 5, 11 and 12), bass vocals (track 12)
- John Duffey — mandolin (tracks 1 and 6), tenor vocals (tracks 2, 4, 5, 7, 8 and 12)
- Jimmy Gaudreau — mandolin (tracks 2–5, 7–10 and 12), lead vocals (tracks 2–5, 7, 9, 11 and 12)
- Doyle Lawson — mandolin (track 11)
- Eddie Adcock — banjo (all except tracks 1 and 6), baritone vocals (tracks 2 and 5), lead vocals (tracks 5, 7, 9 and 12)
- Bill Emerson — banjo (tracks 1 and 6)
- Tom Gray — bass (tracks 1, 6 and 11), baritone vocals (tracks 4 and 6), tenor vocals (track 9)
- Ed Ferris — bass (tracks 2–5 and 7–10), bass vocals (tracks 7 and 9)
- Bill Yates — bass (track 12)
- Kenny Haddock — dobro (tracks 1 and 10)
- Charles R. Freeland — production
- Pete Kuykendall — engineering (tracks 2, 4, 5, 7 and 9), guitar (track 7)
- John Rogers — engineering (tracks 3, 8 and 10)
- Jack Logan — engineering (track 11)
- Jack Casey — engineering (track 11)
- Gary Sanford — engineering (track 12)
- Ronnie Bucke — photography
