= Yesterday & Today Volume 2 =

1973 compilation album by The Country Gentlemen

Compilation album by The Country Gentlemen
- Released: 1973
- Recorded: 1962–1971
- Genre: Progressive bluegrass
- Length: 36:06
- Label: Rebel
- Producer: Charles R. Freeland

The Country Gentlemen compilation chronology
Yesterday & Today Volume 1 (1973)	Yesterday & Today Volume 2 (1973)	Yesterday & Today Volume 3 (1974)

Yesterday & Today Volume 2 is a compilation album by American progressive bluegrass band the Country Gentlemen. Released in 1973 by Rebel Records, it features twelve recordings from between 1962 and 1971 that had not previously been released, including two live tracks. The album is the second in a trilogy of compilations under the same name, preceded by Yesterday & Today Volume 1 earlier in 1973 and followed by Yesterday & Today Volume 3 in 1974.

== Track listing ==
Yesterday & Today Volume 2 track listing
No.	Title	Writer(s)	Recording date	Length
1.	"Columbus Stockade Blues"	John Duffey; Charlie Waller	August 21, 1963	2:16
2.	"Girl Behind the Bar"	Carter Stanley	November 11, 1971	3:01
3.	"Man of Constant Sorrow"	Lash LaRue	August 17, 1963	3:47
4.	"Aunt Dinah's Quilting Party"	Waller	September 27, 1963	2:48
5.	"Cripple Creek" (live)	Traditional	September 3, 1967	3:14
6.	"Philadelphia Lawyer"	Woody Guthrie	November 17, 1962	2:59
7.	"This Land Is Your Land"	Guthrie	August 21, 1963	2:34
8.	"Lord I'm Coming Home"	Duffey; Waller	January 17, 1968	3:40
9.	"Windy and Warm" (live)	John D. Loudermilk	July 3, 1966	2:46
10.	"Doin' My Time"	Jimmie Skinner	December 19, 1969	3:08
11.	"East Virginia Blues"	Duffey	April 14, 1963	2:58
12.	"Over the Hills to the Poor House"	Ronnie Bucke	June 11, 1970	2:55
Total length:				36:06

== Personnel ==
- Charlie Waller — guitar, lead vocals
- John Duffey — mandolin (tracks 1, 3–9 and 11), tenor vocals (tracks 1, 3–8 and 11), lead vocals (tracks 3, 4, 6 and 7)
- Doyle Lawson — mandolin and tenor vocals (track 2)
- Jimmy Gaudreau — mandolin (tracks 10 and 12, lead vocals (track 10), tenor vocals (track 12)
- Eddie Adcock — banjo (all except tracks 2 and 12), baritone vocals (tracks 1, 3–5, 7, 8 and 11), lead vocals (track 4)
- Bill Emerson — banjo (tracks 2 and 12), baritone vocals (track 12)
- Tom Gray — bass (tracks 1, 3, 4, 6, 7 and 11)
- Bill Yates — bass (tracks 2, 10 and 12)
- Ed Ferris — bass (tracks 5, 8 and 9), bass vocals (track 8)
- Mike Auldridge — dobro (track 2)
- Charles R. Freeland — production
- John Rogers — engineering (tracks 1, 3 and 7)
- Roy Homer — engineering (track 2, 8, 10 and 12)
- Pete Kuykendall — engineering (tracks 4, 6 and 11)
- Gary Sanford — engineering (track 5)
- Richard N. Drevo — engineering (track 9)
- Ronnie Bucke — photography
