= Yesterday & Today Volume 1 =

1973 compilation album by The Country Gentlemen

Compilation album by The Country Gentlemen
- Released: 1973
- Recorded: 1963–1971
- Genre: Progressive bluegrass
- Length: 35:40
- Label: Rebel
- Producer: Charles R. Freeland

The Country Gentlemen compilation chronology
The Best of the Early Country Gentlemen (1971)	Yesterday & Today Volume 1 (1973)	Yesterday & Today Volume 2 (1973)

Yesterday & Today Volume 1 is a compilation album by American progressive bluegrass band the Country Gentlemen. Released in 1973 by Rebel Records, it features twelve recordings from between 1963 and 1971 that had not previously been released, including four live tracks. The album is the first in a trilogy of compilations under the same name, followed by Yesterday & Today Volume 2 later in 1973 and Yesterday & Today Volume 3 in 1974.

== Track listing ==
Yesterday & Today Volume 1 track listing
No.	Title	Writer(s)	Recording date	Length
1.	"Are You Waiting Just for Me" (live)	Ernest Tubb	September 3, 1967	2:47
2.	"The Fields Have Turned Brown"	Carter Stanley	December 5, 1971	3:02
3.	"Tom Dooley"	Alan Lomax; Frank Warner	August 17, 1963	3:02
4.	"Less of Me"	Glen Campbell	December 4, 1970	2:00
5.	"Long Black Veil" (live)	Danny Dill; Marijohn Wilkin	September 3, 1967	3:58
6.	"When They Ring Those Golden Bells"	Daniel de Marbelle	March 16, 1968	2:59
7.	"I Never Will Marry"	Traditional	August 18, 1963	3:15
8.	"Electricity"	Jimmy Murphy	June 5, 1964	2:19
9.	"Under the Double Eagle" (live)	Charlie Waller	September 3, 1967	3:25
10.	"Blue Yodel #4"	Jimmie Rodgers	June 5, 1964	2:53
11.	"Get in Line Brother" (live)	Lester Flatt	September 3, 1967	2:48
12.	"Mrs. Robinson"	Paul Simon	December 19, 1969	3:12
Total length:				35:40

== Personnel ==
- Charlie Waller — guitar, lead vocals, tenor vocals (track 4)
- John Duffey — mandolin (tracks 1, 3, 5 and 7–11), tenor vocals (tracks 1, 3, 7, 8 and 11), lead vocals (tracks 1, 5 and 10)
- Doyle Lawson — mandolin and tenor vocals (track 2)
- Jimmy Gaudreau — mandolin (tracks 4 and 12), baritone vocals (track 4)
- Bill Emerson — banjo (tracks 1 and 4), baritone vocals (track 1), lead vocals (track 4)
- Eddie Adcock — banjo (all except tracks 1 and 4), baritone vocals (tracks 3, 5, 7, 8 and 11)
- Ed Ferris — bass (tracks 1, 5, 9 and 11), bass vocals (track 11)
- Bill Yates — bass (tracks 2 and 4)
- Tom Gray — bass (tracks 3, 7, 8 and 10)
- Mike Auldridge — dobro (tracks 2 and 4)
- Bobbi Woods — tambourine (track 4)
- Charles R. Freeland — production
- Gary Sanford — engineering (tracks 1, 5, 9 and 11)
- Roy Homer — engineering (tracks 2, 4 and 12)
- John Rogers — engineering (tracks 3 and 7)
- Bob Lloyd — engineering (track 6)
- Pete Kuykendall — engineering (tracks 8 and 10)
- Ronnie Bucke — photography
