= List of Country Gentlemen members =

This article represents a list of all past members of the bluegrass group Country Gentlemen.

== Founding members ==
Founding members of Country Gentlemen in 1957 were:

- Charlie Waller - vocals, guitar
- Bill Emerson - banjo, vocals
- John Duffey - mandolin, vocals
- Larry Lahey - bass

The most famous are two other lineups of the Country Gentlemen, usually called 1st Classic and 2nd Classic Lineup.

== 1st Classic lineup: 1960 - 1964 ==
- Charlie Waller - vocals, guitar
- Eddie Adcock - banjo, vocals
- John Duffey - mandolin, vocals
- Tom Gray - bass, vocals

Members of this lineup were inducted into the International Bluegrass Music Hall of Honor in 1996.

== 2nd Classic lineup: 1972 - 1973 ==
- Charlie Waller - vocals, guitar
- Bill Emerson - banjo, vocals
- Doyle Lawson - mandolin, vocals
- Bill Yates - bass, vocals

== List of all past members by instrument ==
=== Guitar ===
Founding member (and the only one who was with the group from the beginning until the end), Charlie Waller played exclusively the acoustic guitar. There were other members of the group, who contributed with guitar playing from time to time, especially for the songs where banjo was omitted, or when the group needed to overdub an extra acoustic guitar.

- Charlie Waller (1957-2004)
- Pete Kuykendall (1958-1959)
- Randy Waller
- John Duffey
- Eddie Adcock
- Darin Aldridge
- Kenny Smith
- Billy Rose
- Gene Woten
- Jimmy Gaudreau
- Kent Dowell

=== Mandolin ===
- John Duffey (1957–69)
- Jimmy Gaudreau (1969-1972, 1981-1983)
- Doyle Lawson (1972-1979)
- Rick Allred (1979-1981)
- Jimmy Bowen (1983-1995)
- Darin Aldridge (1995-2004)
- Randall Hylton
- Jeff Davis
- Tim Finch
- David Kirk
- Norman Wright
- Dwight McCall
- Matthew Allred

=== 5-string banjo ===
- Bill Emerson (1957-1958, 1970-1973)
- Pete Kuykendall (1958-1959)
- Porter Church (June/July 1959)
- Eddie Adcock (1959-1970)
- Walter Hensley (September 1961)
- James Bailey (1974, 1976-1979, 1986-1988)
- Mike Davis (1981-1986)
- Doyle Lawson (1974)
- Mike Lilly (1973-1974)
- Bill Holden (1974-1976)
- Kent Dowell (1979-1981)
- Dick Smith (1981-1988)
- Keith Little (1988)
- Kevin Church (1988-1990)
- Billy Rose (1990-1991)
- Greg Corbett (1991-2004)
- Mark Delaney
- Adam Poindexter

=== Acoustic bass ===
There were number of different bassist during almost five decades of lasting of the band. Tom Gray and Bill Yates were the most prominent ones, the latter spent almost 20 years with the group.

- Larry Lahey (1957)
- Tom Morgan (1958)
- Jim Cox (1958-1960)
- Tom Gray (1960–64)
- Ed Ferris (1964–69)
- Ed McGlothlin (1969)
- Bill Yates (1970-1990)
- Jimmy Bowen (1990-1995)
- Ronnie Davis (1995-2004)
- Tim Ashley
- Steve Block
- Gary Creed
- Stoney Edwards
- Billy Gee
- Spider Gilliam
- Sonny Johnson
- Billy Rose
- Roy Self
- Lester Deaton - bass
- Gene Wooten
- Jimmy Gaudreau

=== Dobro ===
The Country Gentlemen used Dobro later on in their career - starting in 1973. Jerry Douglas and Mike Auldridge can be considered as the most prominent players on this instrument.

- Jerry Douglas (1973–74, 1975, 1978)
- Mike Auldridge
- John Duffey
- Brian Blaylock
- Kenny Haddock
- Rob Ickes (2004)
- Gene Wooten
- Kim Gardmer
- Carl Nelson
- Steve Wilson

=== Fiddle ===
The Country Gentlemen used fiddle occasionally on some of their recordings and during some concerts. Ricky Skaggs was the most notable fiddle player for the group.

- Ricky Skaggs
- John Hall
- Carl Nelson
- Greg Luck
- Glenn Duncan (1992)
- Tim Smith (1995)
