= 25 Years (Country Gentlemen album) =

Greatest hits album by Country Gentlemen
- Released: 1980
- Genre: Bluegrass, progressive bluegrass
- Label: Rebel Records
- Producer: Charles R. Freeland

Country Gentlemen chronology
Calling My Children Home (1978)	25 Years (1980)	Sit Down, Young Stranger (1980)

Professional ratings
Review scores
Source	Rating
Allmusic	5/5 stars

25 Years is a compilation album by the progressive bluegrass band Country Gentlemen, released in 1980 by Rebel Records. The compilation, made up of 24 tracks, aims to capture the first 25 years of the history of the band with all various incarnations of the Country Gentlemen.

== Track listing ==
No.	Title	Writer(s)	Length
1.	"Matterhorn"	Mel Tillis	2:18
2.	"I Am Weary, Let Me Rest"	Pete Roberts (Pete Kuykendall)	2:32
3.	"Two Little Boys"	Traditional	3:14
4.	"The World's No Place to Live"		2:49
5.	"Girl from the North Country"	Bob Dylan	3:43
6.	"500 Miles"		3:29
7.	"Aunt Dinah's Quilting Party"		2:48
8.	"Copper Kettle"		2:53
9.	"Helen"		2:23
10.	"Little Bessie"	Traditional	3:29
11.	"Many a Mile"	Bill Sky	2:20
12.	"Come All Ye Tender-Hearted"		3:08
13.	"Teach Your Children"	Graham Nash	2:34
14.	"Where I'm Bound"	Tom Paxton	2:22
15.	"Redwood Hill"	Gordon Lightfoot	2:38
16.	"Letter to Tom"	John Duffey	3:13
17.	"Less of Me"	Glen Campbell	2:02
18.	"Devil's Little Angel"		3:52
19.	"The Likes of You"	Randall Hylton	2:05
20.	"This Morning at Nine"	Sid Campbell	2:24
21.	"Dixieland for Me"	Curtis McPeake	2:30
22.	"The Fields Have Turned Brown"	Carter Stanley	3:04
23.	"Over the Hills to the Poorhouse"	David Braham	2:57
24.	"Come and Sit by the River"	Roehrig	3:29

== Personnel ==
- Charlie Waller – guitar, vocals
- Doyle Lawson – mandolin, vocals
- James Bailey – banjo, vocals
- Bill Yates – bass, vocals
- Spider Gillam – bass
- Ed Ferris – bass, vocals
- Eddie Adcock – banjo, vocals
- John Duffey – mandolin, vocals
- Tom Gray – bass, vocals
