= Traveler and Other Favorites =

Album by The Country Gentlemen

The Traveler And Other Favorites

Studio album by Country Gentlemen
- Released: 1968
- Recorded: 1968
- Genre: Bluegrass; Progressive bluegrass
- Label: Rebel Records

Country Gentlemen chronology
Live From The Stage Of The Roanoake Bluegrass Festival (1967)	The Traveler And Other Favorites (1968)	New Look, New Sound (1970)

The Traveler And Other Favorites is an album by the progressive bluegrass band Country Gentlemen, recorded in 1968.

== Track listing ==
1. The Border Incident
2. Johnny Reb
3. The Traveler
4. Baby Blue
5. Theme From Exodus
6. Working On A Road
7. Many A Mile
8. Matterhorn
9. Buffalo Girls
10. Amelia Earthart
11. Dark as a Dungeon
12. Beautiful Life

== Personnel ==
- Charlie Waller - guitar, vocals
- John Duffey - mandolin, vocals
- Eddie Adcock - banjo, vocals
- Ed Ferris - bass, vocals
