= The Award Winning Country Gentlemen =

Studio album by Country Gentlemen
- Released: 1972
- Recorded: 1972
- Genre: Bluegrass; Progressive bluegrass
- Length: 38:13
- Label: Rebel Records
- Producer: Charles R. Freeland

Country Gentlemen chronology
Sound Off (1971)	The Award Winning Country Gentlemen (1972)	Going Back To The Blue Ridge Mountains (1973)

Professional ratings
Review scores
Source	Rating
Allmusic	5/5 stars

The Award Winning Country Gentlemen is an album by the progressive bluegrass band Country Gentlemen, recorded in 1972. This album features the 2nd classic lineup of the band with Charlie Waller, Doyle Lawson, Bill Emerson and Bill Yates on bass.

== Track listing ==
1. Walkin' Down the Line (Dylan) 2:06
2. The Legend of the Rebel Soldier (Moore) 2:56
3. Redwood Hill (Lightfoot) 2:38
4. The Fields Have Turned Brown (Stanley) 3:00 *(bonus track)
5. C.G. Express (Doyle Lawson) 2:24
6. Little Bessie (Traditional) 3:35
7. Old Pine Tree (Grant) 3:06
8. The Son of Hickory Holler's Tramp (Dallas Frazier) 2:31
9. Take Me Home, Country Roads (Bill Danoff, John Denver, Taffy Nivert) 2:32
10. Secret of the Waterfall (Jake Landers) 3:06
11. Breakin' It Down (Bill Emerson) 2:24
12. The Girl Behind the Bar (Carter Stanley) 3:01 *(bonus track)
13. Get in Line Buddy (Bill Yates) 2:14
14. New Freedom Bell (Osborne) 2:40
- bonus tracks added to album upon 1990 CD re-issue

== Personnel ==
- Charlie Waller - guitar, vocals
- Doyle Lawson - mandolin, vocals
- Bill Emerson - banjo, vocals
- Bill Yates - bass, vocals

with Mike Auldridge - Dobro
