= Live in Japan (The Country Gentlemen album) =

Album by The Country Gentlemen

Live In Japan

Live album by Country Gentlemen
- Released: 1972
- Recorded: 1971
- Genre: Bluegrass, progressive bluegrass
- Length: 58:54
- Label: Rebel
- Producer: Gary B. Reid

Country Gentlemen chronology
New Look, New Sound (1970)	Live In Japan (1972)	The Best of the Early Country Gentlemen (1971)

Professional ratings
Review scores
Source	Rating
Allmusic	4/5 stars

Live In Japan is a live album by the progressive bluegrass band Country Gentlemen, recorded in 1970 during their concert in Japan.

Just before the group was scheduled for their tour in Japan, John Duffey decided to leave, citing his fear of flying. He was replaced by Jimmy Gaudreau, but on this album the mandolin is played by Doyle Lawson, who replaced Gaudreau two years later.

== Track listing ==
1. "Fox on the Run" (Tony Hazzard) 2:30
2. "Little Bessie" 3:38
3. "Train" 2:21
4. "The Legend of the Rebel Soldier" (Charlie Moore) 2:55
5. "Walking Down the Line" 2:05
6. "Matterhorn" (Danny Dill, Mel Tillis) 3:00
7. "Take Me Home, Country Roads" (Bill Danoff, John Denver, Taffy Nivert) 2:30
8. "He Will Set Your Fields on Fire" 2:30
9. "Cripple Creek" 3:25
10. "Foggy Mountain Breakdown" (Earl Scruggs) 2:20
11. "East Virginia Blues" 2:35
12. "Redwood Hill" (Gordon Lightfoot) 2:50
13. "I'll Break Out Again Tonight" (A.L. Owens, Sanger Shafer) 3:20
14. "Under the Double Eagle" (Josef Wagner) 2:40
15. "Copper Kettle" 2:45
16. "Yesterday" (John Lennon, Paul McCartney) 3:15
17. "Bringing Mary Home" (Duffey) 3:25
18. "Seeing Nellie Home" 4:10
19. "Along the Way" (Duffey) 2:55
20. Hank Snow Medley 3:45

== Personnel ==
- Charlie Waller - guitar, vocals
- Doyle Lawson - mandolin, vocals
- Bill Emerson - banjo, vocals
- Bill Yates - bass, vocals
