= The Country Gentlemen Featuring Ricky Skaggs on Fiddle =

The Country Gentlemen featuring Ricky Skaggs

Compilation album by Country Gentlemen
- Released: 1987
- Genres: Bluegrass; Progressive bluegrass
- Label: Vanguard Records

Country Gentlemen chronology
Good As Gold (1987)	The Country Gentlemen featuring Ricky Skaggs (1987)	Return Engagement (1988)

Professional ratings
Review scores
Source	Rating
Allmusic	3/5 stars

The Country Gentlemen featuring Ricky Skaggs is a compilation album by the progressive bluegrass band Country Gentlemen.

== Track listing ==
1. Travelling Kind (Young) 3:28
2. Souvenirs (Prine) 2:44
3. Leaves That Are Green (Simon) 1:49
4. Irish Spring (Skaggs) 3:15
5. Home in Louisiana (Davis) 2:26
6. City of New Orleans (Goodman) 3:02
7. House of the Rising Sun (trad.) 3:26
8. Catfish John (McDill, Reynolds) 2:31
9. Heartaches (Hoffman, Klenner) 4:27
10. One Morning in May (Keith, Rooney) 3:12
11. Bringing Mary Home (Duffey, Kingston, Mank) 3:33
12. Welcome to New York (Emerson, Lawson) 2:50

== Personnel ==
- Charlie Waller - guitar, vocals
- Doyle Lawson - mandolin, vocals
- Bill Emerson - banjo, vocals
- Bill Yates - bass, vocals
- Mike Auldridge - Dobro
- James Bailey -banjo
- Jerry Douglas - Dobro
- Ricky Skaggs - violin, vocals
