= One Wide River to Cross =

One Wide River To Cross

Studio album by Country Gentlemen
- Released: 1971
- Recorded: 1971
- Genre: Bluegrass; Progressive bluegrass
- Label: Rebel Records

Country Gentlemen chronology
The Best of the Early Country Gentlemen (1971)	One Wide River To Cross (1971)	Sound Off (1971)

Professional ratings
Review scores
Source	Rating
Allmusic	3/5 stars

One Wide River To Cross is an album by the progressive bluegrass band Country Gentlemen, recorded in 1971.

== Track listing ==
1. One Wide River to Cross
2. Born Again
3. Heaven
4. On The Sunny Side of Life
5. Gone Home
6. Little White Church
7. I Am a Pilgrim
8. Rank Strangers
9. He Will Set Your Fields on Fire
10. Weapon of Prayer
11. I'm Using My Bible for a Roadmap
12. Are You Washed in the Blood

== Personnel ==
- Charlie Waller - guitar, vocals
- Jimmy Gaudreau - mandolin, vocals
- Bill Emerson - banjo, vocals
- Bill Yates - bass
