= The Best of the Early Country Gentlemen =

1971 compilation album by The Country Gentlemen

Compilation album by The Country Gentlemen
- Released: 1970
- Recorded: 1962–1963
- Genre: Progressive bluegrass
- Length: 36:38
- Label: Rebel
- Producer: Pete Kuykendall

The Country Gentlemen compilation chronology
The Best of the Early Country Gentlemen (1970)	Yesterday & Today Volume 1 (1973)

The Best of the Early Country Gentlemen is a compilation album by American progressive bluegrass band the Country Gentlemen. Released in 1971 by Rebel Records, it features songs recorded during 1962 and 1963, most of which were released on the studio albums Folk Session Inside and Hootenanny: A Blue Grass Special. The album received a Japanese release in 1974, and was later reissued as a digital download by Rebel in 2010.

== Track listing ==
The Best of the Early Country Gentlemen track listing
No.	Title	Writer(s)	Original release	Length
1.	"The Young Fisherwoman"	Don McHan	Folk Session Inside (1963)	4:30
2.	"Bluebirds Are Singing"	Lash LaRue	Folk Session Inside (1963)	2:11
3.	"I Am Weary"	Pete Kuykendall	Folk Session Inside (1963)	2:31
4.	"Heartaches"	Al Hoffman; John Klenner	Folk Session Inside (1963)	2:59
5.	"Sad and Lonesome Day"	A. P. Carter	Folk Session Inside (1963)	2:34
6.	"Katy Dear"	Traditional	Hootenanny: A Blue Grass Special (1962)	4:17
7.	"This Morning at Nine"	Sid Campbell	Folk Session Inside (1963)	2:23
8.	"500 Miles"	John Duffey; Kuykendall	Hootenanny: A Blue Grass Special (1962)	3:26
9.	"Copper Kettle"	A. F. Beddoe	Non-album single (1963)	2:53
10.	"The Gentleman Is Blue"	Eddie Adcock; Duffey	Previously unreleased	3:36
11.	"Can't You Hear Me Calling"	Bill Monroe	Folk Session Inside (1963)	2:22
12.	"You Left Me Alone"	Tom Gray	Hootenanny: A Blue Grass Special (1962)	2:56
Total length:				36:38

== Personnel ==
- Charlie Waller — guitar, lead vocals
- John Duffey — mandolin, tenor vocals, lead vocals (tracks 1 and 7)
- Eddie Adcock — banjo, baritone vocals
- Tom Gray — bass, bass vocals (track 3)
- Pete Kuykendall — engineering, percussion (track 9)
