= Early Rebel Recordings: 1962–1971 =

Compilation album by Country Gentlemen
- Released: 1998
- Recorded: 1962–1971
- Genre: Bluegrass, progressive bluegrass
- Label: Rebel
- Producer: Country Gentlemen

Country Gentlemen chronology
Sugar Hill Collection (1995)	Early Rebel Recordings: 1962–1971 (1998)	High Lonesome (1998)

Professional ratings
Review scores
Source	Rating
Allmusic	5/5 stars

Early Rebel Recordings: 1962–1971 is a compilation album by the progressive bluegrass band Country Gentlemen. A collection of 110 songs, 5 of them previously unreleased, divided on 4 CD's, the album includes various lineups of the early Country Gentlemen. It includes the first and second classic lineup, while adding Dobro of Mike Auldridge or second guitar by Pete Kuykendall.

== Track listing ==
=== Disc 1 ===
1. Christmas Time Back Home (Duffey, Streeter) 3:09
2. Heavenward Bound (Duffey) 2:17
3. I Am Weary, Let Me Rest (Pete Kuykendall) 2:38
4. Sad And Lonesome Day (Traditional) 2:33
5. The Bluebirds Are Singing for Me (John Duffey, Pete Kuykendall) 2:24
6. The White Rose (Traditional) 2:34
7. The Gentleman Is Blue (Eddie Adcock, John Duffey) 3:36
8. Philadelphia Lawyer (Woody Guthrie) 2:59
9. Spanish Two Step (Bob Wills) 2:35
10. Bringing Mary Home (Duffey) 3:00
11. The Convict And The Rose (Chapin, King) 2:38
12. Banks of the Ohio (Traditional) 3:00
13. Down Where the River Bends (Jack Anglin, Peck, Johnnie Wright) 2:29
14. Battle Hymn of the Republic (Ward, Steffe) 1:46
15. This World's No Place to Live (Duffey, Streeter) 2:48
16. Uncle Joe (Eddie Adcock) 2:58
17. Northbound (Eddie Adcock) 2:16
18. I Let the Light Shine Down (Swan) 1:54
19. Girl From the North Country (Bob Dylan) 3:42
20. Cold Wind A Blowing (John Duffey, Hill) 2:14
21. Jingle Bells (James Lord Pierpont) 1:25
22. Silent Night (Franz Gruber, Mohr) 1:51
23. We Three Kings (Hopkins) 1:49
24. Blue Bell (Adcock, Duffey) 2:28
25. It's All Over Now, Baby Blue (Dylan) 3:26
26. Matterhorn (Danny Dill, Mel Tills) 2:18
27. Dark As a Dungeon (Merle Travis) 3:32
28. Big Bruce (John Duffey) 2:48

=== Disc 2 ===
1. When They Ring Those Golden Bells (Traditional) 2:58
2. Buffalo Gals (Traditional) 2:06
3. A Beautiful Life (Golden) 2:42
4. I'm Working On A Road (Lester Flatt) 2:51
5. A Border Affair (Clark, Williams) 3:20
6. Johnny Reb (Merle Kilgore) 2:34
7. Many A Mile (Bill Sky) 2:18
8. Amelia Earhart's Last Flight (David McEnery) 2:31
9. Lord, I'm Coming Home (Traditional) 3:47
10. The Traveler (John Duffey) 3:12
11. Silver Bell (Traditional) 1:57
12. Theme From Exodus (Ernest Gold) 2:47
13. Love and Wealth (Ira Louvin, Charlie Louvin) 2:41
14. He Was a Friend of Mine (Traditional) 3:00
15. Daybreak In Dixie (Bill Napier) 2:01
16. Some Old Day (Louise Certain, Gladys Stacey) 2:32
17. Raggy Mountain Shakedown (John Duffey) 2:08
18. Banana Boat Song (Attaway, Burgess) 2:41
19. Going to the Races (John Duffey) 1:48
20. Waiting for the Boys to Come Home (Presley) 2:25
21. Darling Little Joe (A.P. Carter) 2:40
22. El Dedo (Eddie Adcock) 2:57
23. I'll Be There Mary Dear (Harry Von Tilzer, Andrew Sterling) 3:11
24. Blue Ridge Cabin Home (Louise Certain, Gladys Stacey) 2:29
25. Take Me In a Lifeboat (Frank Southern) 2:41
26. The Sentence (Eddie Adcock) 2:40
27. Where I'm Bound 2:20 (Tom Paxton)

=== Disc 3 ===
1. To the Rescue (Eddie Adcock) 2:55
2. Rodger Young (Frank Loesser) 2:30
3. Green, Green Grass of Home (Claude Putman) 2:36
4. Along the Way (John Duffey) 2:51
5. Let's (Eddie Adcock) 2:22
6. Rambling Boy (Tom Paxton) 3:22
7. Gentlemen's Concerto (Jimmy Gaudreau) 2:31
8. Take Me Back to the Valley (Traditional) 4:02
9. Fare-Thee-Well Cisco (Tom Paxton) 2:11
10. Preaching, Praying, Singing (McCarty) 1:45
11. Mrs. Robinson (Paul Simon) 3:10
12. Two Little Boys (Traditional) 2:51
13. Doin' My Time (Jimmie Skinner) 3:10
14. Rank Strangers (Albert Brumley) 3:03
15. Heaven (McSpadden) 2:54
16. Gone Home (Bill Carlisle) 2:06
17. Rank Strangers (Albert Brumley) 2:57
18. I'm Using My Bible for a Roadmap (Don Reno, Charles Schroeder) 2:54
19. Over The Hills To The Poorhouse (Braham, Catlin) 2:55
20. Little White Church (Wellman) 2:11
21. Heaven (McSpadden) 2:56
22. Bill Bailey (Hughie Cannon) 1:56
23. He Will Set Your Fields On Fire 2:28
24. Are You Washed In the Blood (Elisha Hoffman) 2:30
25. One Wide River (Traditional) 1:40
26. On The Sunny Side of Life (Traditional) 2:20
27. Born Again (Louvin) 2:12
28. I'll Break Out Again Tonight (A.L. Owens, Sanger Shafer) 3:08

=== Disc 4 ===
1. Less of Me (Campbell) 2:00
2. I Am a Pilgrim (Merle Travis) 2:15
3. Weapon of Prayer (Louvin) 3:20
4. If I Were Free (Edmonson) 3:37
5. Teach Your Children (Graham Nash) 2:34
6. Fox on the Run (Tony Hazzard) 2:32
7. Johnny and Jack Medley 3:13
8. I'd Rather Live By the Side of the Road (Albert Brumley) 3:10
9. These Men of God (Ellis, Williams) 2:22
10. Cowboys and Indians (Bill Emerson) 1:55
11. Sea of Heartbreak (Hal David, Hampton) 2:51
12. Orange Blossom Mandolin (Ervin Rouse) 3:09
13. Yesterday (John Lennon, Paul McCartney) 3:16
14. The Girl Behind the Bar (Stanley) 2:59
15. The Son of Hickory Holler's Tramp (Dallas Frazier) 2:31
16. Take Me Home, Country Roads (Bill Danoff, John Denver, Taffy Nivert) 2:31
17. Redwood Hill (Gordon Lightfoot) 2:38
18. Secret of the Waterfall (Jake Landers) 3:06
19. Walkin' Down the Line (Bob Dylan) 2:04
20. Breakin' It Down (Bill Emerson) 2:23
21. New Freedom Bell (Osborne) 2:40
22. The Old Pine Tree (Grant) 3:04
23. The Legend of the Rebel Soldier (Charlie Moore) 2:55
24. C.G. Express (Doyle Lawson) 2:23
25. Little Bessie (Traditional) 3:34
26. The Fields Have Turned Brown (Stanley) 3:00
27. Get in Line Buddy (Bill Yates) 2:13

== Previously unreleased tracks ==
From the 110 tracks, released on this collection, were the following, which were not previously released:

- The Convict and the Rose
- Uncle Joe
- Silver Bell
- Love and Wealth
- Heaven

== Personnel ==
- Charlie Waller - guitar, vocals
- Rick Allred - mandolin, vocals
- Bill Emerson - banjo, vocals
- Eddie Adcock - banjo, guitar, vocals
- Bill Yates - bass, vocals
- John Duffey - mandolin, guitar
- Jimmy Gaudreau - mandolin, guitar
- Doyle Lawson - mandolin, violin, guitar, vocals
- Mike Auldridge - Dobro
- Tom Gray - bass, vocals
- Len Holsclaw - bass
- Ed Ferris - bass
- Ed McGlothlin - bass
- Bill Yates - bass
- Bobbi Woods - tambourine
- Pete Kuykendall - guitar
- Ray Marshall - vibes
