= Souvenirs (The Country Gentlemen album) =

Studio album by Country Gentlemen
- Released: 1995
- Recorded: 1995
- Genre: Bluegrass; Progressive bluegrass
- Label: Rebel Records
- Producer: Len Holsclaw

Country Gentlemen chronology
Sugar Hill Collection (1995)	Souvenirs (1995)	Early Rebel Recordings: 1962-1971 (1998)

Professional ratings
Review scores
Source	Rating
Allmusic	3/5 stars

Souvenirs is a studio album by the progressive bluegrass band Country Gentlemen released in 1995.

== Track listing ==
1. Mountains and Memories (Bucke) 03:26
2. Mother of a Miner's Child (Lightfoot) 02:31
3. Where the Moss Grows over the Stone (Craft, Louvin) 03:08
4. Wild Rose (Cordle, Jackson) 04:00
5. Faded Love (Wills, Wills, Wills, Wills) 03:00
6. Drifting Away (Jackson) 02:16
7. One More Hill (Hylton) 02:16
8. Souvenirs (Grappelli, Prine, Reinhardt) 02:25
9. Lady With the Flower in Her Hair (McPeak) 04:19
10. Noah's Ride (Corbett) 02:53
11. Too Many Cooks in the Kitchen (Holmes) 02:21
12. Hunker Down (Spaulding) 02:34

== Personnel ==
- Charlie Waller - guitar, vocals
- Jimmy Bowen - mandolin, vocals
- Ronnie Davis - bass
- Greg Corbett - banjo

with

- Kim Gardner - Dobro
- Tim Smith - violin
