= New Look, New Sound =

Album by The Country Gentlemen

Studio album by Country Gentlemen
- Released: 1970
- Recorded: 1970
- Genre: Bluegrass; Progressive bluegrass
- Label: Rebel Records

Country Gentlemen chronology
| Play It Like It Is (1969) | New Look, New Sound (1970) | Live In Japan (1970) |

New Look, New Sound is an album by the progressive bluegrass band Country Gentlemen, recorded in 1970. After this album, founding member Eddie Adcock left the lineup.

== Track listing ==
1. The Sentence
2. Where I'm Bound
3. To The Rescue
4. Roger Young
5. Green Green Grass Of Home
6. Along The Way
7. Let's
8. Rambling Boy
9. Gentlemen's Concerto
10. Take Me Back To The Valley
11. Fare Thee Well Cisco
12. Preachin' Prayin' Singin'

== Personnel ==
- Charlie Waller - guitar, vocals
- Jimmy Gaudreau - mandolin, vocals
- Eddie Adcock - banjo, vocals
- Ed McGlothlin - electric bass
