= Remembrances & Forecasts =

Studio album by Country Gentlemen
- Released: 1974
- Recorded: 1974
- Genre: Bluegrass; Progressive bluegrass
- Label: Vanguard Records

Country Gentlemen chronology
The Country Gentlemen featuring Ricky Skaggs on fiddle (1973)	Remembrances & Forecasts (1974)	Joe's Last Train (1976)

Professional ratings
Review scores
Source	Rating
Allmusic	4/5 stars

Remembrances & Forecasts is an album by the progressive bluegrass band Country Gentlemen, released in 1974.

== Track listing ==
1. Willow Creek Dam
2. Remembrance of You
3. Irish Spring
4. Billy McGhee
5. Home in Louisiana
6. King of Spades
7. Little Grave
8. Delta Queen
9. Heartaches
10. Welcome to New York
11. Lord Protect My Soul
12. Circuit Rider

== Personnel ==
Left to right

- Jerry Douglas - Dobro
- Ricky Skaggs - Fiddle, vocals
- James Bailey - Banjo
- Charlie Waller - Guitar, Vocals
- Bill Yates - Bass, Vocals
- Doyle Lawson - Mandolin, Vocals
