= Let the Light Shine Down =

Compilation album by Country Gentlemen
- Released: 1991
- Recorded: 1991
- Genres: Bluegrass; Progressive bluegrass
- Length: 33:58
- Label: Rebel Records
- Producer: Country Gentlemen

Country Gentlemen chronology
Nashville Jail (1990)	Let the Light Shine Down (1991)	New Horizon (1992)

Professional ratings
Review scores
Source	Rating
Allmusic	3/5 stars

Let the Light Shine Down is a compilation album by the progressive bluegrass band Country Gentlemen released in 1991. It contains songs from recordings from 1962 to 1976.

== Track listing ==
1. Let the Light Shine Down (Swan) 1:54
2. Lord Don't Leave Me Here (Jones) 2:19
3. Waiting for the Boys to Come Home (Presley) 2:24
4. Along the Way (Duffey) 2:50
5. I'd Rather Live by the Side of the Road (Albert Brumley) 3:10
6. Take Me in a Lifeboat (Frank Southern) 2:40
7. Crying Holy (Traditional) 2:07
8. Preachin', Prayin', Singin' (McCarty) 1:45
9. These Men of God (Williams) 2:23
10. Working on a Road (Lester Flatt) 2:50
11. Heavenward Bound (John Duffey) 2:16
12. Paul and Silas (Traditional) 1:45
13. When They Ring Those Golden Bells (Traditional) 2:57
14. Beautiful Life (Golden) 2:38

== Personnel ==
- Charlie Waller - guitar, vocals
- John Duffey - mandolin, guitar, vocals
- Eddie Adcock - banjo, vocals
- Tom Gray - bass, vocals
- Mike Auldridge - Dobro
