= Joe's Last Train =

Studio album by Country Gentlemen
- Released: 1976
- Recorded: 1976
- Genre: Bluegrass; Progressive bluegrass
- Label: Rebel Records
- Producer: Charles R. Freeland

Country Gentlemen chronology
Remembrances & Forecasts (1974)	Joe's Last Train (1976)	Calling My Children Home (1978)

Professional ratings
Review scores
Source	Rating
AllMusic	3/5 stars
The Encyclopedia of Popular Music	3/5 stars

Joe's Last Train is an album by the progressive bluegrass band Country Gentlemen, released in 1976.

== Critical reception ==
Country Standard Time wrote that "you hear the expert instrumentalists you expect, but the vocal work provides the anchor ... the harmonies are beautiful."

== Track listing ==
1. Joe's Last Train 2:53
2. Ages and Ages Ago 2:22
3. In My Younger Days 2:25
4. Pamela Brown 2:28
5. Cryin' Holy 2:12
6. This Land Must Die 3:32
7. Bloody Mary Morning 2:42
8. Goin' Home 2:33
9. Texas Chili 1:51
10. Free as the Wind 2:36
11. Dixieland for Me 2:37
12. Lord Don't Leave Me Here 2:20

== Personnel ==
- Charlie Waller - guitar, vocals
- Doyle Lawson - mandolin, vocals
- Bill Holden - banjo, vocals
- Bill Yates - bass, vocals

with

- Mike Auldridge - Dobro
- Ed Ferris - bass, vocals
