= Sound Off (The Country Gentlemen album) =

Studio album by Country Gentlemen
- Released: 1971
- Recorded: 1971
- Genre: Bluegrass; Progressive bluegrass
- Label: Rebel Records

Country Gentlemen chronology
One Wide River To Cross (1971)	Sound Off (1971)	The Award Winning Country Gentlemen (1972)

Professional ratings
Review scores
Source	Rating
Allmusic	3/5 stars

Sound Off is an album by the progressive bluegrass band Country Gentlemen, recorded in 1971.

== Track listing ==
1. If I Were Free (Edmonson)
2. Cowboys and Indians (Bill Emerson)
3. Sea of Heartbreak (Hal David, Hampton)
4. I'll Break Out Again Tonight (A.L. Owens, Sanger Shafer)
5. Orange Blossom Mandolin (Ervin Rouse)
6. These Men of God (Williams)
7. Teach Your Children (Graham Nash)
8. Yesterday (John Lennon, Paul McCartney)
9. Fox on the Run (Tony Hazzard)
10. Johnny and Jack Medley
11. Bill Bailey (Hughie Cannon)
12. By the Side of the Road (Albert Brumley)

== Personnel ==
- Charlie Waller - guitar, vocals
- Jimmy Gaudreau - mandolin, vocals
- Bill Emerson - banjo, vocals
- Bill Yates - bass, vocals

With:

- Mike Auldridge - resonator guitar
