= Calling My Children Home =

Studio album by Country Gentlemen
- Released: 1978
- Recorded: 1976–1977
- Genre: Bluegrass, progressive bluegrass
- Length: 35:32
- Label: Rebel
- Producer: Charles R. Freeland

Country Gentlemen chronology
Joe's Last Train (1976)	Calling My Children Home (1978)	25 Years (1980)

Professional ratings
Review scores
Source	Rating
Allmusic	3/5 stars

Calling My Children Home is an album by the progressive bluegrass band Country Gentlemen, recorded in 1976-1977 and released in 1978.

== Track listing ==
1. "The Place Prepared for Me" (Sweatman) – 2:17
2. "I'm Ready to Go Home" (Hazel Houser) – 3:51
3. "Hallelujah Side" (Entwisle, Oatman) – 2:53
4. "Palms of Victory" (Matthias) – 3:35
5. "Calling My Children Home" (trad.) – 2:46
6. "Inside the Gate" (J.D. Sumner) – 2:33
7. "I've Never Been There" (Parris) – 2:21
8. "The Great Beyond" (Reed) – 3:37
9. "Lord, I'm Just a Pilgrim" (trad.) – 3:01
10. "Where Could I Go But to the Lord" (Coats) – 3:44
11. "Come on, Dear Lord, and Get Me" (Easterlin) – 2:16
12. "Where No Cabins Fall" (Jeffress)– 2:38

== Members ==
- Charlie Waller - guitar, vocals
- Doyle Lawson - mandolin, vocals
- James Bailey - banjo, vocals
- Bill Yates - bass, vocals

with

- Spider Gillam - bass
- Ed Ferris - bass, vocals
- Bill Holden - vocals
