= Sit Down, Young Stranger =

Studio album by Country Gentlemen
- Released: 1980
- Recorded: 1980
- Genre: Bluegrass; Progressive bluegrass
- Label: Sugar Hill Records

Country Gentlemen chronology
25 Years (1980)	Sit Down, Young Stranger (1980)	River Bottom (1981)

Professional ratings
Review scores
Source	Rating
Allmusic	4.5/5 stars

Sit Down, Young Stranger is a studio album by the progressive bluegrass band Country Gentlemen, released in 1980.

== Track listing ==
1. "Come Sit by the River" (Roehrig)
2. "Meet Me on the Other Side" (Linda Stalls)
3. "Love and Wealth" (Ira Louvin)
4. "The Likes of You" (Randall Hylton)
5. "You're the One"
6. "Darby's Castle" (Kris Kristofferson)
7. "Sit Down Young Stranger" (Gordon Lightfoot)
8. "It's Just Like Heaven"
9. "For the First Time" (Matthew Eddy)
10. "South Elm Street" (Rick Allred)
11. "Blue Ridge Mountains Turning Green" (Jim Lunsford)
12. "The Lonely Dancer" (Coulter)

== Personnel ==
- Charlie Waller - guitar, vocals
- Rick Allred - mandolin, vocals
- Kent Dowell - banjo, vocals
- Bill Yates - bass, vocals
- Mike Auldridge - resonator guitar
- James Bailey - banjo, baritone vocals
- Ronnie Bucke - drums
- Spider Gilliam - drums
- Doyle Lawson - mandolin, lead guitar
