= On the Road (The Country Gentlemen album) =

Live album by Country Gentlemen
- Released: 1963, reissued in 2001
- Recorded: 1961–1963
- Genre: Bluegrass, progressive bluegrass
- Length: 61:00
- Label: Smithsonian Folkways
- Producer: D.A. Sonneborn, Daniel Sheey

Country Gentlemen chronology
Bluegrass at Carnegie Hall (1962)	On the Road (1963)	Hootenanny (1963)

Professional ratings
Review scores
Source	Rating
Allmusic	4.5/5 stars

On the Road is a live album by the bluegrass band Country Gentlemen, recorded in 1963. It continues to offer some of the best collection of songs by the first classic lineup of the group. The album originally contained 13 songs, selection from 2 concerts in 1962 and 1963. In 2001, Smithsonian Folkways re-released the album as a CD with 6 bonus tracks, recorded at Carnegie Hall on September 16, 1961.The album offers blend of folk and bluegrass music, while expanding compositions of Bill Monroe, Ralph Stanley as well as traditional songs to the more progressive bluegrass sound.

== Track listing ==
1. "Handsome Molly" (Duffey, Kuykendall) 2:59
2. "The Sunny Side of Life" (Bolick) 2:33
3. "Poor Ellen Smith" (Traditional) 2:28
4. "Long Black Veil" (Danny Dill, Marijohn Wilkin) 4:10
5. "Grandfather's Clock" (Eddie Adcock, Henry Clay Work) 3:14
6. "Ain't Got No Home" (Henry) 3:48
7. "Heartaches" (Al Hoffmann, John Klenner) 2:51
8. "Little Glass of Wine" (Ralph Stanley) 3:38
9. "Walking in Jerusalem" (Traditional) 2:22
10. "I Am a Pilgrim" (Merle Travis) 3:00
11. "A Letter to Tom" (John Duffey) 3:47
12. "Raw Hide" (Bill Monroe) 3:00
13. "Blue Ridge Mountain Blues" (Traditional) 2:59
14. "I Ain't Gonna Work Tomorrow" (Traditional) 2:51
15. "A Letter to Tom" (John Duffey) 3:28
16. "John Hardy" (Traditional) 3:08
17. "The Fields Have Turned Brown" (Carter Stanley, Ralph Stanley) 4:06
18. "These Men of God" (Ellis P. Williams, J. Williams) 2:57
19. "Little Sparrow" (John Duffey) 3:47

== Personnel ==
- Charlie Waller - guitar, vocals
- John Duffey - mandolin, vocals
- Eddie Adcock - banjo, vocals
- Tom Gray - bass, vocals
