= New Horizon (The Country Gentlemen album) =

Studio album by Country Gentlemen
- Released: 1992
- Recorded: 1992
- Genre: Bluegrass; Progressive bluegrass
- Length: 37:16
- Label: Rebel Records
- Producer: Gary B. Reid

Country Gentlemen chronology
Let The Light Shine Down (1991)	New Horizon (1992)	Sugar Hill Collection (1995)

Professional ratings
Review scores
Source	Rating
Allmusic	3/5 stars

New Horizon is a studio album by the progressive bluegrass band Country Gentlemen, released in 1992.

== Track listing ==
1. The Foggy Dew (Randall Hylton) 2:19
2. Fickle Wind (Randall Hylton) 2:16
3. Even Now 3:36
4. Somewhere in Kansas (Gaskin) 3:02
5. Trouble Is Your Child (Gaskin) 3:25
6. Waltz of the Angels (Dick Reynolds, Jack Rhodes) 3:46
7. Frankie and Johnnie (Traditional) 2:07
8. Cumberland River (Randall Hylton) 2:24
9. Gonna Be Raining When I Die (Pete Goble, Bobby Osborne) 3:09
10. Room At The Top Of The Stairs (Randall Hylton) 3:46
11. Limehouse Blues (Douglas Furber, Philip Braham) 2:53
12. New Freedom Bell (Osborne) 3:02
13. Parent's Prayer (Evens, May) 2:14

== Personnel ==
- Charlie Waller – guitar, vocals
- Randall Hylton – mandolin, vocals
- Billy Rose – banjo, guitar, bass guitar, vocals
- Jimmy Bowen – bass guitar, mandolin, vocals
- Glen Duncan – violin
- Gene Wooten – guitar, bass guitar, Dobro
