= Going Back to the Blue Ridge Mountains =

Live album by The Country Gentlemen

Going Back To The Blue Ridge Mountains

Live album by Country Gentlemen
- Released: 1973, re-issued 2007
- Recorded: Live performances, early-mid 60's
- Genre: Bluegrass; Progressive bluegrass
- Length: 46:29
- Label: Folkways Records; Smithsonian Folkways
- Producer: Daniel Sheeby

Country Gentlemen chronology
The Award Winning Country Gentlemen (1972)	Going Back To The Blue Ridge Mountains (1973)	Yesterday & Today Volume 1 (1973)

Professional ratings
Review scores
Source	Rating
Allmusic	4/5 stars

Going Back To The Blue Ridge Mountains is a live album by the progressive bluegrass band Country Gentlemen. It includes songs performed live by the "almost classic" lineup of the group (without Tom Gray, with Ed Ferris on bass). The recordings come from live performances during early and mid 60's.

== Track listing ==
1. Going Back to the Blue Ridge Mountains 2:00
2. Going to the Races 2:09
3. Azzuro Campana 2:41
4. Dark as a Dungeon 5:05
5. Copper Kettle 3:01
6. Billy in the Low Ground 2:19
7. I Saw the Light 2:09
8. Tom Dooley #2 2:55
9. Brown Mountain Light 2:43
10. Electricity 2:30
11. Daybreak in Dixie 2:22
12. Mary Dear 3:52
13. Sad and Lonesome Day 2:40
14. Cripple Creek 2:49
15. Don't This Road Look Rough and Rocky 3:16
16. Muleskinner Blues 3:58

== Personnel ==
- Charlie Waller - guitar, vocals
- John Duffey - mandolin, vocals
- Eddie Adcock - banjo, vocals
- Ed Ferris - bass, vocals
