= Classic Country Gents Reunion =

Studio album by Country Gentlemen
- Released: 1989
- Recorded: 1989
- Genres: Bluegrass; Progressive bluegrass
- Label: Sugar Hill Records
- Producer: Eddie Adcock

Country Gentlemen chronology
Return Engagement (1988)	Classic Country Gents Reunion (1989)	Nashville Jail (1990)

Classic Country Gents Reunion is an album by the progressive bluegrass band Country Gentlemen, released in 1989. The first classic lineup from the 60' reunites here to record this album.

== Track listing ==
1. "Fare Thee Well"
2. "Stewball"
3. "I'll Be Here In the Morning"
4. "Champagne Breakdown"
5. "Here Today and Gone Tomorrow"
6. "Gonna Get There Soon"
7. "Hey Lala"
8. Casey's Last Ride (Kris Kristofferson)
9. "Wild Side of Life"
10. "Wait a Little Longer" (Hazel Houser)
11. "Back Home In Indiana" (Ballard MacDonald, James Hanley)
12. "Thinking of You"
13. "Say Won't You Be Mine" (Carter Stanley)

== Personnel ==
- Charlie Waller - guitar, vocals
- John Duffey - mandolin, vocals
- Eddie Adcock - banjo, vocals
- Tom Gray - bass, vocals

With

- Mike Auldridge - resonator guitar
