= Cliff Waldron =

American bluegrass musician (1941–2024)

- Born: Clifford Waldron; April 4, 1941; Jolo, West Virginia, U.S.
- Origin: Washington, D.C., U.S.
- Died: July 1, 2024 (aged 83) Virginia, U.S.
- Genres: Country; bluegrass; gospel
- Occupation: Bluegrass musician
- Instruments: Guitar, voice, mandolin
- Years active: 1963–2000s
- Label: Rebel

Clifford Waldron (April 4, 1941 – July 1, 2024) was an American bluegrass musician. Waldron is best known for his collaborations with bluegrass musician Bill Emerson, with the two forming the bluegrass duo Emerson & Waldron, as well as the formation of his own band, Cliff Waldron and the New Shades Of Grass.

== Early life ==
Waldron was born April 4, 1941, in Jolo, West Virginia, a small rural community in McDowell County. He grew up listening to Bill Monroe, Flatt & Scruggs, and the Stanley Brothers. As a teenager, he played mandolin and guitar and later performed in local bands.

== Career ==
Waldron played mandolin for the Page Valley Boys for a short time.

Waldron relocated to the Washington, D.C. area in the early 1960s and went on to perform with regional pickers. Waldron soon formed a relationship with bluegrass musician Bill Emerson and began performing with him, forming the duo Emerson & Waldron.

The initial band was called The Lee Highway Boys, but was changed to Emerson & Waldron and it stuck. Though the partnership with Emerson was short lived, it provided three, well received recordings on Rebel Records.

In 1970, Emerson rejoined The Country Gentlemen, replacing Eddie Adcock. Waldron briefly played with the Shenandoah Cut-Ups before recruiting his former bandmates into a new band, the New Shades Of Grass, who backed up his first solo release. The band made several well-received albums into the mid-1970s. Waldron stopped making commercial music in the early 1970s, however. For the next two decades he worked for the National Park Service, though he sometimes played music at his church and made some private gospel music recordings.

In 1975, Waldron dedicated his life to Christ. He made two albums in the middle 1970s, Gospel and God Walks the Dark Hills, before taking a break from music to begin a career with the National Park Service.

In 1996, Waldron retired from his job at the National Park Service and returned to bluegrass. From 1998 to 2003, he recorded four new albums: Old Friends and Memories, Seasons Past, Higher Ground, a gospel collection with bluegrass musician Paul Williams, and A Little Ways Down the Road.

Waldron died in Virginia on July 1, 2024, at the age of 83.
