= Folk Session Inside =

Album by The Country Gentlemen

Studio album by Country Gentlemen
- Released: 1963
- Recorded: 1963
- Genre: Bluegrass, progressive bluegrass
- Label: Design
- Producer: Garry B. Reid

Country Gentlemen chronology
Hootenanny (1963)	Folk Session Inside (1963)	Bringing Mary Home (1966)

Folk Session Inside is an album by the bluegrass band Country Gentlemen, recorded in 1963. This album proved to be the last for bassist Tom Gray.

== Track listing ==
1. The Bluebirds Are Singing For Me (Mac Wiseman) 2:14
2. Sad And Lonesome Day (Traditional) 2:37
3. The Girl Behind The Bar (Stanley) 3:05
4. Can't You Hear Me Callin' (Bill Monroe) 2:26
5. The School House Fire (Traditional) 4:00
6. Nightwalk (Eddie Adcock) 2:40
7. The Galveston Flood (Traditional) 3:08
8. The Young Fisherwoman 4:34
9. This Morning At Nine (Sid Campbell) 2:27
10. I Am Weary (Let Me Rest) (Pete Kuykendall) 2:35
11. Aunt Dinah's Quilting Party (Traditional) 2:52
12. Heartaches (Al Hoffman, John Klenner) 3:03
13. Dark As A Dungeon (Merle Travis) 4:21

== Personnel ==
- Charlie Waller - guitar, vocals
- John Duffey - mandolin, vocals
- Eddie Adcock - banjo, vocals
- Tom Gray - bass, vocals
- Pete_Kuykendall - percussion, track 6
