= Country Gentlemen =

Country Gentlemen may refer to:

- The Country Gentleman, an American agricultural magazine
- Country Gentlemen (film), a 1936 American film directed by Ralph Staub
- The Country Gentlemen, an American bluegrass band that originated during the 1950s
  - The Country Gentlemen (album)
- The Country Gentleman (1903–1905), British periodical, that became The Country Gentleman and Land & Water (1905–1915), then Land & Water (1916–1920)
