= Complete Vanguard Recordings =

Compilation album by Country Gentlemen
- Released: 2002
- Recorded: 2002
- Genre: Bluegrass; Progressive bluegrass
- Label: Vanguard Records
- Producer: Fred Jasper, Doyle Lawson, Maynard Solomon, Jack Lothorp

Country Gentlemen chronology
Crying In the Chapel (2001)	Complete Vanguard Recordings (2002)	45 Years of Memories (2002)

Professional ratings
Review scores
Source	Rating
Allmusic	4/5 stars

Complete Vanguard Recordings is a compilation album by the progressive bluegrass band Country Gentlemen, which they recorded for the Vanguard Records label.

== Track listing ==
1. Travelling Kind (Young) 3:28
2. Don Quixote (Lightfoot) 2:56
3. One Morning In May (Traditional) 3:10
4. Casey's Last Ride (Kristofferson) 4:16
5. The Leaves That Are Green (Paul Simon) 1:47
6. Paradise (John Prine) 3:30
7. House of the Rising Sun (Traditional) 3:27
8. Catfish John (Bob McDill, Allen Reynolds) 2:31
9. Mother Of A Miner's Child (Lightfoot) 2:29
10. Bringing Mary Home (John Duffey, Larry Kingston, Chaw Mank) 3:31
11. Souvenirs (John Prine) 2:43
12. City of New Orleans (Steve Goodman) 3:02
13. Willow Creek Dam (Leroy Drumm, Pete Goble) 2:44
14. Remembrance of You (Pete Roberts) 2:48
15. Irish Spring (Ricky Skaggs) 3:12
16. Billy McGhee (Leroy Drumm, Pete Goble) 2:57
17. Home in Louisiana (Jimmie Davis) 2:24
18. King of Spades (Alexander) 3:03
19. The Little Grave (Loudermilk) 2:18
20. Delta Queen (Leroy Drumm, Pete Goble) 2:39
21. Heartaches (Al Hoffman, John Klenner) 4:25
22. Welcome to New York (Bill Emerson, Doyle Lawson) 2:50
23. Lord Protect My Soul (Monroe) 2:34
24. Circuit Rider (Leroy Drumm, Pete Goble) 2:31

== Personnel ==
- Charlie Waller - guitar, vocals
- Mike Auldridge - Dobro
- James Bailey - banjo
- Jerry Douglas - Dobro
- Bill Emerson - banjo, vocals
- Al Rogers - drums
- Ricky Skaggs - violin, guitar, vocals
- Bill Yates - bass
