= Greg Corbett =

American musician (1972-2014)

Gregory James Corbett (August 27, 1972 – August 24, 2014) was an American banjo player from North Carolina.

Corbett was best known for his work with the bluegrass bands The Country Gentlemen and The Circuit Riders.

== Career ==
The son of Jimmy and Phebe Corbett, Greg began playing at a young age in groups such as the Dark Mountain Band. He joined The Country Gentlemen in 1991 as the group's banjo player. He played with the group until the group's founder Charlie Waller died in 2004. Corbett went on to found the group The Circuit Riders along with other band members of The Country Gentlemen. The group released a single CD in late 2006.

== Death ==
Corbett died in his sleep on August 24, 2014, aged 41, from undisclosed causes.
