= River Bottom =

River Bottom may refer to:

- River Bottom (album) by Country Gentlemen, 1980
- River Bottom, Oklahoma, United States
- River Phoenix (1970–1993), American actor, musician and activist
- "River Bottom", by Country Gentlemen from River Bottom (album), 1980

== See also ==
- At the Bottom of the River, a 1983 short story collection by Jamaica Kincaid
- "Bottom of the River", by Delta Rae from Carry the Fire, 2012
- "Riverbottom", by Texas Hippie Coalition from Pride of Texas, 2008
- Stream bed, the bottom of a stream or river, or the physical confine of the normal water flow
