= Return Engagement =

Return Engagement may refer to:

- Return Engagement, a 1978 episode of the Hallmark Hall of Fame
- Return Engagement (1983 film), a documentary film featuring Timothy Leary and G. Gordon Liddy
- Return Engagement (1990 film), a Hong Kong action film
- Return Engagement (play), a 1940 play by Lawrence Riley
- Return Engagement (album), a 1988 album by The Country Gentlemen
- "Return Engagement" - a jazz composition on Stanley Turrentine's debut album, Look Out!
- Settling Accounts: Return Engagement, a novel by Harry Turtledove
