= High Lonesome (Country Gentlemen album) =

Compilation album by Country Gentlemen
- Released: 1998
- Recorded: 1998
- Genre: Bluegrass; Progressive bluegrass
- Label: Starday Records

Country Gentlemen chronology
Early Rebel Recordings: 1962-1971 (1998)	High Lonesome (1998)	Crying In the Chapel (2001)

Professional ratings
Review scores
Source	Rating
Allmusic	4.5/5 stars

High Lonesome is a compilation album by the progressive bluegrass band Country Gentlemen. It's a collection of all recordings for the group's first label, Starday Records.

== Track listing ==
1. Backwoods Blues
2. Yesterday's Love
3. Dixie Lookaway
4. It's the Blues
5. High Lonesome
6. Banjo Hop
7. The Church Back Home
8. Orange Blossom Fiddle
9. Hey, Little Girl
10. The Devil's Own
11. Rollin' Stone (Waters)
12. Nine Pound Hammer (Travis)
13. I'll Never Marry
14. Travelin' Dobro Blues
15. Nobody's Business
16. New Freedom Bell (alt. take)
17. New Freedom Bell (Osborne)
18. The Hills and Home
19. A Letter to Tom (Duffey)
20. Darling Allalee
21. Tomorrow's My Wedding Day
22. Helen
23. Blue Man
24. Rememberance [sic] of You
25. Red Rockin' Chair (Christian)
26. If That's the Way You Feel
27. I Know I've Lost You
28. Two Little Boys (trad.)
29. Willie Roy, The Cripple Boy
30. Sunrise
31. Silence or Tears
32. Country Concert
33. These Men of God Williams
34. Down Where the Still Waters Flow
35. Nobody's Business
36. Copper Kettle
37. Night Walk
38. Home Sweet Home
39. This Land Is Your Land (Guthrie)
40. My Old Kentucky Home (Foster)
41. Take This Hammer (trad.)
42. Auld Lang Syne (Burns, trad.)
43. Goodbye Katy
44. Camptown Races (Foster)
45. Red River Valley
46. Oh, Susannah (trad.)
47. Long Journey Home
48. 500 Miles (West)
49. Free Little Bird
50. Rose Connelly
51. Blowin' in the Wind (Dylan)

== Personnel ==
- Charlie Waller - guitar, vocals
- John Duffey - mandolin, vocals
- Eddie Adcock - banjo, vocals
- Tom Gray - bass, vocals
- Bill Emerson - banjo, vocals
- John Hall - violin
- Carl Nelson - violin
- Ed Ferris - bass
- Pete Kuykendall - bass, banjo, guitar
