= Crying in the Chapel (album) =

Crying In the Chapel

Studio album by Country Gentlemen
- Released: 2001
- Recorded: 2001
- Genre: Bluegrass; Progressive bluegrass
- Label: Freeland Records

Country Gentlemen chronology
High Lonesome (1998)	Crying In the Chapel (2001)	Complete Vanguard Recordings (2002)

Crying In the Chapel is a studio album by the progressive bluegrass band Country Gentlemen.

== Track listing ==
1. Crying in the Chapel (Glenn) 2:54
2. I Feel Like Traveling On (Bland, Hunter, Vaughn) 2.23
3. Heaven Got an Angel (Andes) 3:36
4. Don't You Know That I'm Happy (MacMillion) 2:35
5. Nobody's Child (Coben, Foree) 3:10
6. I'll Never Die Just Be Promoted (Ellison, Groves) 2:14
7. She Wore Pretty Dresses (Goodman) 3:10
8. Jericho Road (Bowser) 2:52
9. The Coal Mines Is a Good Place to Pray (MacMillion) 2:33
10. City of God (Bruce) 2:36
11. Keep Following Moses (Bowser) 3:15
12. Two Men a Walkin' (Guillot) 2:22

== Personnel ==
- Charlie Waller - guitar, vocals
- Dan Aldridge - mandolin, guitar, vocals
- Greg Corbett - banjo, vocals
- Ronnie Davis - bass, vocals

with

- Gene Libbea - bass
- Greg Luck - violin, bass, guitar
- Rickie Simpkins - mandolin
- Kenny Smith - guitar
- Jaret Carter - Dobro
- Sammy Shelor - banjo, guitar
- Clay Jones - guitar
