= Nashville Jail =

Studio album by Country Gentlemen
- Released: 1990
- Recorded: 1964
- Genre: Bluegrass; Progressive bluegrass
- Length: 28:39
- Label: Mercury Records, Copper Creek Records

Country Gentlemen chronology
Classic Country Gents Reunion (1989)	Nashville Jail (1990)	Let The Light Shine Down (1991)

Professional ratings
Review scores
Source	Rating
Allmusic	3/5 stars

Nashville Jail is an album by the progressive bluegrass band Country Gentlemen — their first classic lineup (Waller-Duffey-Adcock-Gray). Recorded in 1964 when the band was with Mercury Records, the album was not released until 1990 by Copper Creek Records.

== Track listing ==
1. Nashville Jail (Don McHan) 2:04
2. This World's No Place to Live (John Duffey, Hill) 2:57
3. Electricity (Murphy) 2:17
4. Azzurro Campana (Eddie Adcock, John Duffey) 2:28
5. Brown Mountain Light (Scotty Wiseman) 3:18
6. A Cold Wind Blowing (Duffey, Hill) 2:20
7. Uncle Joe (Eddie Adcock) 2:26
8. She's Long, She's Tall (Rodgers) 2:51
9. Theme from Exodus (Ernest Gold) 2:28
10. Flowers by My Grave (Allen, Duffey) 2:52
11. Are You Waiting Just for Me (Ernest Tubb) 2:38

== Personnel ==
- Charlie Waller - guitar, vocals
- John Duffey - mandolin, guitar, vocals
- Eddie Adcock - banjo, vocals
- Tom Gray - bass, vocals

and

- Pete Kuykendall - guitar, engineer, liner notes, producer
- Ed Ferris - bass
