= Hootenanny (The Country Gentlemen album) =

Album by the bluegrass band Country Gentlemen

Studio album by Country Gentlemen
- Released: 1963
- Recorded: 1963
- Genres: Bluegrass, progressive bluegrass
- Label: Design Records

Country Gentlemen chronology
On the Road (1963)	Hootenanny (1963)	Folk Session Inside (1963)

Hootenanny is an album by the American bluegrass band Country Gentlemen, recorded in 1963.

== Track listing ==
1. Nine Pound Hammer (Merle Travis)
2. Pallet On The Floor (Traditional)
3. East Virginia Blues (Traditional)
4. Eddie On The Freeway (Adcock)
5. 500 Miles (Hedy West)
6. Knoxville Girl (Traditional)
7. Red Wing (Traditional)
8. Nearer My God To Thee (Traditional)
9. Katy Dear (Traditional)
10. You Left Me Alone (Gray/Stuart)

== Personnel ==
- Charlie Waller - guitar, vocals
- John Duffey - mandolin, vocals
- Eddie Adcock - banjo, vocals
- Tom Gray - bass, vocals
