= High Lonesome =

High Lonesome may refer to:

== Books ==
- High Lonesome: New & Selected Stories, 1966–2006, a short story collection by Joyce Carol Oates
- High Lonesome, a 1962 Western novel by Louis L'Amour
- High Lonesome, a 1996 short story collection by Barry Hannah

== Films ==
- High Lonesome (film), a 1950 Western film directed by Alan Le May
- A Father for Charlie, also released as High Lonesome, a 1995 television film directed by Jeff Bleckner

== Places ==
- Coeur d'Alene Mountains, part of the Bitterroot Mountain Range in the Rocky Mountains of North America

== Music ==
- High lonesome, a genre of bluegrass music pioneered by Bill Monroe
- The High Lonesome, an alternative country band whose lead singer was Larry Poindexter
- High Lonesome, an indie rock band named after the short story collection by Barry Hannah

=== Albums ===
- High Lonesome (Randy Travis album), a 1991 album by Randy Travis
- High Lonesome (Charlie Daniels album), a 1976 album by Charlie Daniels Band
- High Lonesome (Country Gentlemen album)
- High Lonesome, a 1999 album by Longview

=== Songs ===
- "High Lonesome", a song by Avail from their 2000 album One Wrench
- "High Lonesome", a song by The Gaslight Anthem from their 2008 album The '59 Sound
- "High Lonesome", a song by Jesse Malin from his 2003 album The Fine Art of Self Destruction
- "High Lonesome", a song by Caspian from their 2012 album Waking Season
