= Seeing Nellie Home =

1884 sheet music

"Seeing Nellie Home" was an original American song written by Patrick S. Gilmore the 'Greatest American Bandleader'. first published in the 1850s under the name "When I Saw Sweet Nellie Home." It was composed and arranged by John Fletcher. Frances Kyle is said to have written the lyrics. In subsequent versions of this song, the lyrics have been changed somewhat. Sometimes the song has been referred to as "Aunt Dinah's Quilting Party."

A Civil War song, "Mother, I Am Going," was sung to the tune of "Seeing Nellie Home."

== Performances and other versions ==
- Performed in part in Tex Avery's Dangerous Dan McFoo short from 1939
- Bing Crosby included the song in a medley on his album Join Bing and Sing Along (1959)
- Live in Japan, 1969, The Country Gentlemen
- "Old Likker in a New Jug", 2004, Mac Wiseman
- "Galax, Virginia Old Time Fiddlers Convention", 1964, Billy Edwards
- "Meet Me Down on Main Street", 1957, Mellomen Barber Shop Quartet
- "Memories of the Lucky U Ranch", 2002, Sons of the Pioneers
- "Bluegrass Instrumentals", 1962, Osborne Brothers
- "Four and a Half", 2009, The New North Carolina Ramblers
- "Reno and Smiley", 1959-1963, Don Reno and Red Smiley
- An unreleased recording of this song by Hank Williams exists
- The Johnny Cash Show of 25 March 1970 featured Cash with the Statler Brothers and the Carter Family singing this song
- "The Waltons"- Season 4, Episode 22, 2/12/76, the entire cast singing this song at the end of the show
- "The Andy Griffith Show" - Season 1, Episode 22, 1961; Season 2, Episode 27, 1962
- Bare Bones as "Seeing Nellie Home (Aunt Dinah's Quilting Party) 2013.
- Jean Arthur sings this early in the 1953 western "Shane"
