= Return Engagement (album) =

Studio album by Country Gentlemen
- Released: 1988
- Recorded: 1988
- Genre: Bluegrass; Progressive bluegrass
- Label: Rebel Records
- Producer: Gary B. Reid

Country Gentlemen chronology
Good As Gold (1983)	Return Engagement (1988)	Classic Country Gents Reunion (1989)

Professional ratings
Review scores
Source	Rating
Allmusic	3/5 stars

Return Engagement is an album by the progressive bluegrass band Country Gentlemen, released in 1988.

== Track listing ==
1. A Miner's Life 2:56
2. Lonely Child 3:10
3. Ain't It Funny 2:31
4. You Were Only Foolin' 2:35
5. Midnight Moon 2:59
6. A Tree That Stands Alone 3:04
7. Don't Stop Being You 3:29
8. Lonesome Highway 3:09
9. Burglar Man 1:50
10. I'd Like to Come Back as a Song 2:53

== Personnel ==
- Charlie Waller - guitar, vocals
- Bill Yates - bass, vocals
- Norman Wright - mandolin, vocals
- Keith Little - banjo, vocals

with

- Glen Duncan - fiddle
- Steve Wilson - dobro

for "Burglar Man"

- Charlie Waller - guitar, vocals
- Jerry Douglas - dobro
- Norman Wright - mandolin
- James Bailey - banjo
- Mark Schatz - bass
