= Sugar Hill Collection =

Compilation album by Country Gentlemen
- Released: 1995
- Recorded: 1995
- Genre: Bluegrass; Progressive bluegrass
- Label: Sugar Hill Records
- Producer: Country Gentlemen

Country Gentlemen chronology
New Horizon (1992)	Sugar Hill Collection (1995)	Early Rebel Recordings: 1962-1971 (1998)

Professional ratings
Review scores
Source	Rating
Allmusic	4.5/5 stars

Calling My Children Home is a compilation album by the progressive bluegrass band Country Gentlemen, recorded and released in 1995.

== Track listing ==
1. Come and Sit by the River (Roehrig) 3:34
2. Meet Me Over on the Other Side (Stalls) 2:09
3. The Likes of You (Randall Hylton) 2:06
4. Darby's Castle (Kris Kristofferson) 2:49
5. Sit Down Young Stranger (Lightfoot) 3:15
6. It's Just Like Heaven (Traditional) 2:04
7. For the First Time (Eddy) 3:17
8. South Elm Street (Allred) 2:13
9. Blue Ridge Mountains Turning Green (Bascom Lamar Lunsford) 3:10
10. The Lonely Dancer (Coulter) 2:35
11. Riverboat Fantasy (Dowell) 2:09
12. God's Coloring Book (Dolly Parton) 3:00
13. River Bottom (Wheeler) 3:06
14. Coal, Black Gold (Simons) 2:15
15. The "In" Crowd (Lehner, McBee) 2:57
16. Electricity (Murphy) 2:19
17. I'm Lonesome Without You (Stanley) 2:24
18. Loving Her Was Easier (Kris Kristofferson) 3:20
19. Things in Life (Don Stover) 3:23
20. Honey Don't (Perkins) 1:50

== Personnel ==
- Charlie Waller - guitar, vocals
- Rick Allred - mandolin, vocals
- James Bailey - banjo, vocals
- Bill Yates - bass, vocals

with

- Doyle Lawson - mandolin, violin, guitar, vocals
- Mike Auldridge - Dobro
- Ronnie Bucke - drums
- Kent Dowell - banjo, guitar, vocals
- Spider Gillam - bass
- Ed Ferris - bass, vocals
