= Webco Records =

- Parent company: Pinecastle
- Founded: 1980
- Founder: Wayne E. Busbice
- Defunct: 1994
- Status: Defunct
- Genre: Bluegrass, country
- Country of origin: U.S.
- Location: Vienna, Virginia
- Official website: pinecastlemusic.com

Webco Records was a record label based in Vienna, Virginia that specialized in bluegrass and old-time music.

== History ==
Webco Records was founded in 1980 by its namesake Mr. Wayne E. Busbice. Between 1985 and 1988, Bill Emerson was A&R director.

In 1989 Bill Emerson and his son John acquired the Webco label, and from 1990 until 1994 John Emerson operated the label as Webco Records of Virginia.

In 1994 Tom Riggs acquired the Webco label in 1994 to be part of Pinecastle Records. This deal included previous released and unreleased recordings, and recording contracts.

Pinecastle has since launched the Webco Classics imprint, on which select recordings previously released on the Webco label were compiled and reissued.

== Roster ==
- Al Jones and Frank Necessary
- Bill Emerson
- Bill Harrell and The Virginians
- Bill Rouse and The Uptown Grass Band
- Bob Purkey and The Blueridge Travellers
- Bobby Atkins and the Countrymen
- Brooke Johns
- Busby Brothers
- Buzz Busby
- Carl Nelson
- Chris Warner
- D. J. & the C.B. Pickers
- Darrell Sanders
- Ernie Sykes
- Gloria Belle
- Hobbs & Partners
- Jack Fincham and The Dixie Grass
- James King
- Jeff Presley
- Jim Eanes
- Jimmy Gaudreau
- Joe Boucher
- Karen Spence and Friends of Bluegrass
- Larry Stephenson
- Pagter and Boucher
- Paul Adkins
- Pete Goble
- South Central Bluegrass
- The Blackthorn Stick Ceili Band
- The Grass Reflection
- The Overland Express
- The Reno Brothers

== See also ==
- List of record labels
