= 45 Years of Memories =

45 Years Of Memories

Studio album by The Country Gentlemen
- Released: 2002
- Recorded: 2002
- Genre: Bluegrass; Progressive bluegrass
- Label: Pinecastle
- Producer: Greg Corbett, Tom Riggs

The Country Gentlemen chronology
Complete Vanguard Recordings (2002)	45 Years Of Memories (2002)	Songs of the American Spirit (2004)

Professional ratings
Review scores
Source	Rating
Allmusic	3/5 stars

45 Years Of Memories features new recordings of audience favorites by the progressive bluegrass band The Country Gentlemen. Credited to "Charlie Waller & The Country Gentlemen," it features Waller showcases from all eras of band, the earliest song dating from 1961.

== Track listing ==
No.	Title	Writer(s)	Length
1.	"The House of the Rising Sun"	Traditional	3:18
2.	"The Little Grave"	John D. Loudermilk	2:30
3.	"Don Quixote"	Gordon Lightfoot	2:55
4.	"Young Fisherwoman"	Don McHan	4:18
5.	"Catfish John"	Bob McDill, Allen Reynolds	2:31
6.	"Remembrance of You"	Pete Roberts (Pete Kuykendall)	3:29
7.	"Amelia Earhart's Last Flight"	David McEnery	3:00
8.	"City of New Orleans"	Steve Goodman	2:54
9.	"One Morning In May"	Traditional	3:11
10.	"Dark As A Dungeon"	Merle Travis	3:37
11.	"Circuit Rider"	Leroy Drumm, Pete Goble	2:29
12.	"Billy McGhee The Drummer Boy"	Leroy Drumm, Pete Goble	2:42
13.	"The Travelling Kind"	Steve Young	3:30

== Personnel ==
=== The Country Gentlemen ===
- Charlie Waller – guitar, vocals
- Dan Auldridge – mandolin
- Greg Corbett – banjo
- Ronnie Davis – bass

=== Additional Musicians ===
- Greg Luck – guitar, fiddle
- Rob Ickes – Dobro
