= Good as Gold! =

Album by The Country Gentlemen

Good As Gold

Studio album by Country Gentlemen
- Released: 1983
- Recorded: 1983
- Genre: Bluegrass; Progressive bluegrass
- Label: Sugar Hill Records

Country Gentlemen chronology
River Bottom (1981)	Good As Gold (1983)	The Country Gentlemen feat. Ricky Skaggs (1987)

Professional ratings
Review scores
Source	Rating
Allmusic	2.5/5 stars

Good As Gold is an album by the progressive bluegrass band Country Gentlemen, released in 1983.

== Track listing ==
1. Good as Gold
2. I Just Got Tired of Being Poor
3. Guysboro Train
4. Hard Times
5. When They Ring Those Golden Bells
6. Someone Is Looking for Someone Like You
7. I've Gone Back to Being Me
8. Have I Told You Lately That I Love You
9. Four Walls
10. Lord, I Hope This Day Is Good
11. Night Ridin'
12. Detour

== Personnel ==
- Charlie Waller - guitar, vocals
- Jimmy Gaudreau - mandolin, baritone/tenor vocals, guitar, bass
- Dick Smith - banjo, vocals
- Bill Yates - bass, tenor vocals
- Robbie Magruder - Drums
