= Buzz Busby =

American singer-songwriter

- Busby in undated photo

Background information
- Born: Bernarr Graham Busbice; September 6, 1933; Eros, Louisiana, U.S.
- Died: January 5, 2003 (aged 69) Catonsville, Maryland, U.S.
- Genres: Bluegrass
- Occupation: Musician
- Instruments: Mandolin, vocals

Bernarr Graham Busbice (September 6, 1933 – January 5, 2003), known professionally as Buzz Busby, was an American bluegrass musician, known for his mandolin style and high tenor voice. He was nicknamed the "Father of Washington, D.C. Bluegrass".

== Early life ==
Busby was born near Eros, Louisiana, the eighth born of the nine children of Oates Oliver (1893-1943) and Talitha Fay (1894-1956) Busbice. In addition to running the family cotton farm, Oates was involved in local politics and Talithe (Fay) was a school teacher. Busbice and his siblings, some of whom were also musicians (notably Wayne Busbice), spent their Saturday nights listening to WSM's Grand Ole Opry and playing for dances with other area musicians. It was likely Busby's first experience with the mandolin came when his neighbor, Allen Crowell, would bring his mandolin over to play during his early childhood. However, he had never heard the mandolin played in the style that Bill Monroe played it. Buzz recalled:"Back in those days Monroe played pretty fast; the hottest mandolin playing I ever heard, and I haven't heard it since. His mandolin playing was heavily influenced by a jazz mandolin player named Paul Buskirk, and I haven't heard him play like that again- or maybe I was just easily impressed then." Buzz picked up the guitar first, learning chords and simple runs from his brothers, Wayne and Lemoyne, who were playing guitar-fiddle duets and singing Monroe Brothers harmonies around their community. Buzz would eventually settle on the mandolin, and his complex style was born. In the late 1940s, Busby started a band with high school friend and guitarist Rot Fuller. Busby honed his mandolin and vocal skills by performing the music of Bill Monroe around the West Monroe, Louisiana area.

Busby graduated from Eros High School in 1951. Because he was valedictorian of his class, Busby was recruited by the FBI, which was seeking gifted young people at that time. In June 1951 Busby moved to the Washington DC area to begin his career with the FBI.

== Professional career ==
Shortly after his arrival in Washington while still working his day job at the FBI, Busby met Scotty Stoneman. The two started a friendship that would last all the way to Stoneman's death in 1973. Their friendship was marked by boyish bickering and spats, as well as their unspoken closeness. It was through Stoneman that Busby met Jack Clement, who was then in the military and stationed in the Washington area, and they formed the Tennessee Troupers, named for Clement's home state. Roy Clark joined the group for a while on banjo. The group had no trouble finding jobs in 1951 and 1952, Buzz recalled playing four to five nights a week during this time. Busby, Clement and Scotty Stoneman played locally at first, then did stints at WWVA in Wheeling, West Virginia and WCOP in Boston. Clement returned home to Tennessee after their shows in Boston ended.

In the early 1950's Bill Carrol managed Busby and booked his shows.

In 1953, Busby and his new partner Pete Pike (guitar) began playing at Pine Tavern, a DC night club. Simultaneously, they performed every weekend on radio station WGAY in Silver Spring, Maryland. Busby and Pike added Donnie Bryant on banjo and became Buzz & Pete and the Bayou Boys. The radio show featured lightning-fast renditions of popular bluegrass and country songs, usually performed in a key or two higher than the original. The comedy act "Ham & Scram," alter-egos of Pike and Busby, was also featured weekly.

In the summer of 1954, Busby, Pike and the band entered the National Country Music Championship in Warrenton, Virginia. Busby and Pike, Along with Donnie Bryant, Scotty Stoneman and Lee Cole on bass won first place in the contest. Shortly after the contest, WRC-TV in Washington hired the band for a daily afternoon television show. Bryant and Stoneman left the band and were replaced by Don Stover on banjo and John Hall on fiddle. The show was immensely popular, employing newly developed video special effects to add to the appeal of the program. The program aired from September 1954 to March 1955.

When the television show was cancelled, Busby auditioned for and was hired by the Louisiana Hayride at KWKH in Shreveport, Louisiana. He and the band, which consisted of Charlie Waller (guitar), Lee Cole (bass) and Don Stover (banjo) performed every Saturday night on the Hayride and toured the South during the week. Stover left in December, 1955 to Join the Lilly Brothers in Boston and was replaced by Vance Trull. Busby and the Bayou Boys performed on the Hayride until May 1956.

Busby, Waller and Trull returned to Washington where they played club dates until July 1957.

On July 4, 1957, Busby, Trull and Eddie Adcock were involved in a serious automobile accident while traveling from North Beach, Maryland back to Washington. Busby's subsequent hospitalization and recuperation left him unable to perform for an extended period. In order to fill the scheduled club dates that Busby and Trull were unable to play, Charlie Waller recruited John Duffey and Bill Emerson. This band became the original Country Gentlemen.

Following his recovery from the accident, Busby continued to play locally in the Washington / Baltimore area until the early 1990s. Busby's release of Talking Banjo in 1958 was the beginning of the boom of record releases from D.C. based bluegrass artists. He also made several attempts to make it in Nashville with a major label. To Busby's demise though, every time he was met with a sob story and heartache. Buzz even enjoyed a short stint with Jimmy Martin, though after one show he realized playing with Martin was not for him. Martin was "too domineering", Buzz says, "he was nice to me and decent and took me to his house for two weeks to take care of me. He was really good for me." During this period he formed partnerships of varying lengths with Bill Harrell, Jack Fincham, and Leon Morris, Band members included his brother Wayne Busbice, Dudley Connell, Richard Underwood and Eddie Stubbs. Also during this period, Rhonda Strickland published a biographical article in the bluegrass publication, Bluegrass Unlimited in November 1986, chronicling Busby's life as a pioneer of the D.C. Bluegrass scene. Busby is now remembered for giving greats such as Dudley Connell, Charlie Waller, John Duffey and many more their start in the music, though he gave his life to bluegrass music as well. When listening to Buzz's recordings one will likely hear the hair-raising, pain-filled, hard-core lonesome bluegrass sound that mirrored his own difficult life. Busby's later career was marred by alcohol and drug abuse.

== Recordings ==
Busby had recordings on many labels. His early recordings mainly resided on Starday, or Mercury-Starday. He would also record on Webco, Mount Vernon, and many others.

Mercury-Starday was a label for the more well known or successful artists on Starday. Busby was perhaps able to be a part of the Mercury-Starday group because his music, though keeping many traditional bluegrass sounds, was atypical of the popular sounds in Nashville at this time.

Starday began releasing old recordings of Busby's music, even as late as the early 2000's, almost 50 years after they were recorded.

In 1965 Rebel Records released Mandolin Twist featuring Buzz Busby, Charlie Waller and Tom Gray.

Busby's song Lost was released in 1957 on Carol Records.

Busby's classic recordings for the Starday label have been reissued on CD. Recorded between 1956 and 1959, the recordings show Busby in the meat of his career, as he was performing more at this point than any other in his career. Studio musicians include Pete Pike, Charlie Waller, Scotty Stoneman, Don Stover, Carl Nelson and Bill Emerson.

Busby continued to record throughout the 1960s into the 1980s.

The recordings listed below are some of his most notable releases with Starday and WEBCO RECORDS.

== Selected discography ==
- Going Home (2003) - Released posthumously as a compilation of songs and tunes that Busby recorded for Starday Records from 1957 through 1959.
- Yesterday and Today (1982)
- A Pioneer of Traditional Bluegrass ( 1981)

== Later life and death ==
Busby was diagnosed with Parkinson's disease in 1997. Shortly thereafter, he was moved to a nursing facility in Maryland. Busby died of heart failure on January 5, 2003, in Catonsville, Maryland.
