= Songs of the American Spirit =

Studio album by Country Gentlemen
- Released: 2004
- Recorded: 2004
- Genre: Bluegrass; Progressive bluegrass
- Label: Pinecastle Records

Country Gentlemen chronology
45 Years of Memories (2002)	Songs of the American Spirit (2004)

Professional ratings
Review scores
Source	Rating
Allmusic	3/5 stars

Songs of the American Spirit is the last studio album by the progressive bluegrass band Country Gentlemen. The album was released August 24, 2004, just six days after the death of Charlie Waller.

== Track listing ==
1. Fighting Side of Me (Haggard) 03:11
2. Be Quiet When Willie Walks By (O'Reilly ) 03
3. Between Fire and Water (Care, Marcus, Seiler) 02:14
4. Crying in the Chapel (Glenn) 03:04
5. Joe (Hall, Hall) 02:35
6. A Miner's Life (Dailey) 02:22
7. Blackberry Blossom [instrumental] (Traditional) 02:42
8. There's a Star Spangled Banner Waving Somewhere (Darnell, Roberts) 03:06
9. My Heart Is On the Mend (Hylton) 02:36
10. River of Tears (Dawson) 02:32
11. Stay in the Wagon Yard (Jones) 01:26
12. The Vision (Waller) 02:53
13. Let Me Fly Low (Hall) 02:48

== Personnel ==
- Charlie Waller - guitar, vocals
- Dan Aldridge - mandolin, guitar, vocals
- Greg Corbett - banjo, vocals
- Ronnie Davis - bass, vocals

with

- Gene Libbea - bass
- Greg Luck - violin, bass, guitar
- Rickie Simpkins - mandolin
- Kenny Smith - guitar
- Jaret Carter - Dobro
- Sammy Shelor - banjo, guitar
- Clay Jones - guitar
