= River Bottom (album) =

Studio album by Country Gentlemen
- Released: 1981
- Recorded: 1981
- Genre: Bluegrass; Progressive bluegrass
- Label: Sugar Hill Records

Country Gentlemen chronology
Sit Down, Young Stranger (1980)	River Bottom (1981)	Good As Gold (1983)

Professional ratings
Review scores
Source	Rating
Allmusic	4.5/5 stars

River Bottom is an album by the progressive bluegrass band Country Gentlemen, released in 1981.

== Track listing ==
1. Riverboat Fantasy (Dowell)
2. God's Coloring Book (Parton)
3. River Bottom (Wheeler)
4. Drifting Too Far from the Shore
5. Coal, Black Gold (Simons)
6. The "In" Crowd Lehner, McBee)
7. Apple Blossom Time in Annapolis Valley
8. Electricity (Murphy)
9. I'm Lonesome Without You Stanley
10. Loving Her Was Easier (Kristofferson)
11. Things in Life (Stover)
12. Honey Don't (Perkins)

== Personnel ==
- Charlie Waller - guitar, vocals
- Rick Allred - mandolin, vocals
- Kent Dowell - banjo, vocals
- Bill Yates - bass, vocals
