= David Davis (bluegrass) =

American mandolinist and bluegrass singer (1961–2024)

- Born: February 16, 1961; Cullman, Alabama, U.S.
- Died: September 15, 2024 (aged 63) Snead, Alabama, U.S.
- Genre: Bluegrass music
- Occupation: Musician
- Instruments: Mandolin, vocals
- Years active: 1984–2024
- Labels: Rounder Records, Rebel Records, Wango Records
- Formerly of: David Davis and the Warrior River Boys
- Website: daviddavisandwrb.com

David L. Davis (February 16, 1961 – September 15, 2024) was an American mandolinist and singer in the bluegrass tradition. He has been cited as a foremost practitioner of Bill Monroe's mandolin technique.

== Biography ==
=== Early years ===
Davis was raised in Cullman, Alabama, in a musical family. His grandfather J.H. Bailey played banjo and fiddle. In the 1930s, his father Leddell Davis and uncles sang the "brother duets" music style (a forerunner of bluegrass music), and Davis's uncle Cleo Davis was a member of the first incarnation of Bill Monroe's Blue Grass Boys.

=== Warrior River Boys ===
Garry Thurmond formed the original Warrior River Boys in 1960. When his health failed in 1984, he turned leadership of the band over to Davis. The band has included fiddler Charlie Cline and former Blue Grass Boy Tom Ewing.

The band recorded 150 songs with Wango Records, launched by radio personality Ray Davis. These "Basement Recordings" have appeared on various albums through the years, many on the Time Life label.

In 1990, Davis released the album New Beginnings followed in 1993 by Sounds Like Home, both on Rounder Records. Released in 2004, the album David Davis & The Warrior River Boys on Rebel Records features a wide range of rarely-covered songs. 2006 saw the release of Troubled Times.

Davis partnered with occasional Warrior River Boys sideman Randall Franks, who is best known as “Officer Randy Goode” from the In the Heat of the Night (TV series), to release an Appalachian brother duet CD “God’s Children” in 2000. Warrior River Boy Marty Hays played bass on the project. They were joined by guests Sonny Shroyer from The Dukes of Hazzard, Ramblin' Tommy Scott, and Cotton and Jane Carrier. Davis and his band also appeared on Franks's country show The Hollywood Hillbilly Jamboree in the 1990s.

In 2009, Davis released Two Dimes & A Nickel on Rebel. He returned to Rounder Records to create “Didn’t He Ramble: The Songs of Charlie Poole” released in 2018. During his four decade career, many talented musicians appeared with the Warrior River Boys but in this era, besides Davis on mandolin, the lineup of the Warrior River Boys included Phillip James (fiddle), Stan Wilemon (guitar), Marty Hays (bass), and Robert Montgomery (banjo).

=== Death ===
On September 15, 2024, Davis died from injuries caused by an automobile accident in Snead, Alabama. He was 63.

=== Awards ===
Davis was inducted into the Alabama Bluegrass Music Hall of Fame in 2010.

In 2014, Davis was inducted into America's Old-Time Country Music Hall Of Fame.

== Discography ==
=== David Davis and the Warrior River Boys ===
- 1986: The Voice in the Night (Stoneground)
- 1988: Passin' Thru (Rutabaga)
- 1990: New Beginnings (Rounder)
- 1993: Sounds Like Home (Rounder)
- 1997: My Dixie Home (Wango)
- 2003: America's Music (Wango)
- 2004: David Davis and the Warrior River Boys (Rebel)
- 2006: Troubled Times (Rebel)
- 2009: Two Dimes & A Nickel (Rebel)
- 2018: Didn't He Ramble: Songs Of Charlie Poole (Rounder)

=== Compilations ===
- 2016: Retrospective: Live 1984-2014 (self-released)

=== Also appears on ===
- 2000: various artists - Freight Trains Rides Again Volume One (Wango)
- 2000: various artists Plum Pitiful Volume Two (Wango)
- 2001: various artists - It's Hymn-Time Volume Two's (Wango)
