= Jimmy Gaudreau =

American singer-songwriter (born 1946)

- Born: James Arnott Gaudreau; July 3, 1946 (age 80); Wakefield, Rhode Island
- Genres: bluegrass music, acoustic music, country music
- Occupation: Musician
- Instrument: Mandolin
- Years active: 1969–present
- Labels: Rounder, Webco, Ridge Runner, Rebel
- Website: jimmygaudreau.com

James Arnott “Jimmy” Gaudreau is a singer and mandolinist playing traditional and progressive bluegrass music. He is best known for his solo albums, and his work with The Country Gentlemen, Tony Rice, and J. D. Crowe.

== Biography ==
=== Early life ===
In high school in the '60s, Gaudreau performed as a professional musician, playing electric guitar in his band Jimmy G & the Jaguars. The band played dances and Saturday nights at his uncle's Rhode Island beachfront restaurant.

During the folk boom, Gaudreau became interested in bluegrass music. When he started playing the mandolin, he used guitar fingering techniques, giving him his unique sound.

=== The Country Gentlemen ===
Gaudreau moved to the Washington, DC area from his native Rhode Island in 1969 to become a member of the Country Gentlemen, replacing John Duffey and joining Charlie Waller, Ed Farris, and Eddie Adcock. In his first stint with the band, he contributed to two albums: New Look New Sound and One Wide River. He rejoined the Gentlemen from 1981 until 1985 to record Good as Gold (Sugar Hill) and Let the Light Shine Down.

=== The II Generation ===
In 1971, Eddie Adcock (banjo) assembled the progressive bluegrass band II Generation with Gaudreau, Bob White (bass), and Wendy Thatcher (guitar). II Generation was known for extended jams, and they called their music "newgrass." They disbanded in 1980.

=== Country Store ===
Gaudreau formed Country Store in 1973 with Keith Whitley (guitar), Carl Jackson (banjo), and Bill Rawlings (bass). Later, Jackson was replaced by Jimmy Arnold, and Whitley was replaced by Chris Stifel. They recorded two albums and broke up in 1975.

=== J. D. Crowe and the New South ===
Gaudreau was also a member of J. D. Crowe and the New South, with Keith Whitley, Bobby Slone (fiddle), and Mike Gregory (bass).

=== Spectrum ===
From 1979 through 1981, Gaudreau was a member of Spectrum with banjoist Béla Fleck and bassist Mark Schatz. They recorded two albums for Rounder Records: Too Hot To Handle (1982) and Live In Japan (1983). After this, Gaudreau returned to the Country Gentlemen for his second stint.

=== Tony Rice Unit ===
Beginning in 1985, Gaudreau was a member of the Tony Rice Unit for 11 years. Besides Rice and Gaudreau, the Unit included Wyatt Rice (guitar), Ronnie Simpkins (bass), and Rickie Simpkins (fiddle). Gaudreau looked for other opportunities when Rice's vocal problems hinted at an end to the band.

=== Chesapeake ===
In 1992, Chesapeake, featuring Gaudreau, Mike Auldridge, T. Michael Coleman, and Moondi Klein, released three critically acclaimed albums on the Sugar Hill label. With no banjo, they were more acoustic country than bluegrass. Chesapeake disbanded in 1999 when their contract with Sugar Hill ended.

=== Auldridge, Bennett & Gaudreau ===
Out of the Chesapeake experience came a trio with Auldridge, Gaudreau, and guitarist Richard Bennett. This group released two albums: Blue Lonesome Wind and This Old Town.

=== Young Mando Monsters ===
In 1994, Gaudreau produced Mandolin Artistry: Vol 1.: Young Mando Monsters, an album showcasing Ronnie McCoury, Adam Steffey, Radim Zenkl, Emory Lester, Wayne Benson, Dan Tyminski, Raymond Legere, and Alan Bibey.

=== Solo recordings ===
Gaudreau's solo career includes The Mandolin Album on Puritan Records. In Good Company on CMH Records in 2006 collects tracks from Gaudreau's career, with Tony Rice, Eddie Adcock, and Charlie Waller, among others.

=== The Country Gentlemen Reunion Band ===
As The Country Gentlemen Reunion Band, Gaudreau with Randy Waller (son of Charlie Waller), Eddie Adcock, and Tom Gray recorded one album in 2008.

=== Carolina Star ===
Gaudreau joined Carolina Star with leader John Starling (guitar) and bandmates Mike Auldridge (resonator guitar), Rickie Simpkins (fiddle), Tom Gray (bass), Larry Stephenson (mandolin), and Jon Randall (guitar).

=== The Fine Group ===
Gaudreau joined Robin and Linda Williams and Jim Watson as part of the Fine Group for several years.

=== Jimmy Gaudreau and Moondi Klein ===
When Chesapeake split up, Gaudreau and vocalist Moondi Klein began to play the occasional show. This led to their 2008 album 2:10 Train, followed by Home From the Mill and then If I Had A Boat, all released on Rebel Records. In 2008, Gaudreau and Klein toured with Emmylou Harris.

=== The Skylighters ===
A group of Washington DC area musicians got together for fun in 2006, and decided to record as the Skylighters. The musicians were Gaudreau (mandolin, vocals), Auldridge (resonator guitar), Eric Brace (guitar, vocals), J. Carson Gray (bass), and Martin Lynds (drums, vocals). They played a mixture of bluegrass, western swing, gospel, and honky-tonk music, and recorded one self-titled album on the Red Beet label.

=== Awards ===
In 2005, Gaudreau was inducted into the Society for the Preservation of Bluegrass Music in America's "Hall of Greats".

== Discography ==
=== Solo albums ===
- 1978: The Gaudreau Mandolin Album (Puritan)
- 1989: Classic J.A.G. (Webco)
- 1998: Live in Holland (as Jimmy Gaudreau's Bluegrass Unit) (Strictly Country Records)
- 2006: In Good Company (CMH)
- 2010: Pieces and Bits (Goose Creek)
- 2017: Give Us Strength (Songside) with Elle Mears

=== With The Country Gentlemen ===
- 1969: New Look, New Sound (Rebel)
- 1971: One Wide River to Cross (Rebel)
- 1971: Sound Off (Rebel)
- 1983: Good as Gold! (Sugar Hill)

=== With Country Store ===
- 1973: Country Store Live (Ridge Runner)
- 1974: Country Store (Rebel)

=== With J. D. Crowe and the New South ===
- 1978: You Can Share My Blanket (Rounder)
- 1979: My Home Ain't In the Hall of Fame (Rounder)
- 1979: Live in Japan (Rounder) released in 1987

=== With Spectrum ===
- 1980: Opening Roll (Rounder)
- 1981: Live in Japan (Rounder)
- 1982: It's Too Hot For Words (Rounder)

=== With Tony Rice ===
- 1986: Me And My Guitar (Rounder)
- 1991: Native American (Rounder)
- 1993: Tony Rice Plays and Sings Bluegrass (Rounder)

=== With Chesapeake ===
- 1994: Rising Tide (Sugar Hill)
- 1995: Full Sail (Sugar Hill)
- 1997: Pier Pressure (Sugar Hill)
- 2014: Hook, Live & Sinker (Chesterbury) compilation of live performances

=== With Auldridge, Bennett, and Gaudreau ===
- 1999: This Old Town (Rebel)
- 2001: Blue Lonesome Wind (Rebel)

=== With the Skylighters ===
- 2006: The Skylighters (Red Beet)

=== With The Country Gentlemen Reunion Band ===
- 2008: The Country Gentlemen Reunion Band (Radio Therapy)

=== With John Starling and Carolina Star ===
- 2007: Slidin' Home (Rebel)

=== With Moondi Klein ===
- 2008: 2:10 Train (Rebel)
- 2012: Home from the Mills (Rebel)
- 2014: If I Had a Boat (Rebel)

=== With Robin and Linda Williams, and their Fine Group ===
- 1993: Turn Toward Tomorrow (Sugar Hill)
- 1996: Sugar for Sugar (Sugar Hill)
- 2004: Deeper Waters (Red House)
- 2005: The First Christmas Gift (Red House)
- 2007: Radio Songs (Red House)
- 2011: Stonewall Country: Songs from the Musical (Red House)

=== With Bill Emerson ===
- 1987: Tennessee 1949 (Webco) with Pete Goble
- 1987: Home of the Red Fox (Rebel)
- 1989: Dixie in My Eye (Webco) with Pete Goble
- 1990: Gold Plated Banjo (Rebel)
- 1991: Reunion (Pinecastle / Webco)
- 1996: Banjo Man (Pinecastle / Webco)
- 2007: Bill Emerson and the Sweet Dixie Band (Rebel)
- 2011: Eclipse (Rural Rhythm)

=== As composer ===
- 2005: Phil Leadbetter - Slide Effects (Pinecastle) - track 6, "Glide Path"

=== Also appears on ===
- 1977: The Allen Brothers - Sweet Rumors (Rounder)
- 1978: Tim Lake - Same Old Roadside Inn (Rounder)
- 1978: The New Tradition - The New Tradition "Live" (Red Clay)
- 1981: Tony Trischka, Bill Keith, and Béla Fleck - Fiddle Tunes for Banjo (Rounder)
- 1982: Béla Fleck - Natural Bridge (Rounder)
- 1987: Paul Adkins - Appalachian Memories (Old Homestead)
- 1987: Béla Fleck - Daybreak (Rounder)
- 1989: James King - It's a Cold, Cold World (Webco)
- 1994: Emerson & Taylor - Appaloosa (Webco)
- 1995: Steve Huber - Pullin' Time (Strictly Country Records)
- 1998: Richard Bennett - A Long Lonesome Time (Rebel)
- 1999: The Blue Dogs - Soul Dogfood (Black River)
- 2000: various artists - Last Day at Gettysburg: Songs About the American Civil War (Rebel)
- 2001: Bill Clifton - Around the World to Poor Valley (Bear Family)
- 2003: BanjerDan - Old Stuff (CD Baby)
- 2006: Joe Meadows - Mountains, Rivers and Meadows (Patuxent Music)
- 2007: various artists - Music of Coal: Mining Songs from the Appalachian Coalfields (Condon Music)
- 2011: Dave Giegerich - It's About Time (self-released)
