= Pete Kuykendall =

American journalist

Peter Van Kuykendall (January 15, 1938 – August 24, 2017) also known as Pete Roberts, was an American bluegrass musician, songwriter, discographer and a magazine and music publisher. He was a co-founder of Bluegrass Unlimited magazine and its editor since 1970. He was instrumental in the formation of the International Bluegrass Music Association (IBMA) in 1985 and the International Bluegrass Music Museum (IBMM) in 1991. In 1996, he was inducted into the International Bluegrass Music Hall of Fame.

== Early life ==
Born in Washington, D.C., he grew up in Arlington, Virginia, attending Washington–Lee High School. An avid record collector from a young age, Kuykendall would listen to country and bluegrass music on the WARL, WGAY and WWVA radio stations. His mother was a piano teacher and Kuykendall played clarinet in his junior and high school concert bands. He learned to play all the bluegrass instruments, but his primary instrument is the five-string banjo. He played banjo as a member of The Country Gentlemen in 1958–1959.

== Career ==
After high school, he studied at Capitol Radio and Electronics Institute (CREI) and was a deejay for WKIK in Leonardtown, Maryland and WFCR (WEEL, now WDCT) in Fairfax, Virginia. Graduated from CREI, he got married and worked for a short time as a recording division technician in the Library of Congress, transferring recordings from fragile discs and cylinders to magnetic tape. He also worked as a broadcast technician at WETA-TV 26 in Washington, DC. He built Wynwood Recording Studio in the basement of his house in Falls Church, Virginia and recorded Mississippi John Hurt there in 1964 and many other blues, bluegrass and country music performers over the years. He produced several albums for the Country Gentlemen, including Nashville Jail in 1964.

== Discographer ==
In the late 1950s, Kuykendall wrote several articles and discographies for Disc Collector magazine which were "the first serious writing about the discographical aspects of the careers of [Bill] Monroe, Reno and Smiley, Flatt and Scruggs and the Stanley Brothers." Folklorist and music scholar Neil V. Rosenberg has called him "the first discographer of bluegrass music."

== Songwriter ==
He composed and arranged songs, often using his stage-name, Pete Roberts, that are now standards in bluegrass, including: "Down Where The Still Waters Flow", "I Am Weary (Let Me Rest)" – used in the soundtrack of the movie O Brother Where Art Thou, "Journey's End", "No Blind Ones There", "Out On The Ocean", "Remembrance Of You" and "Rollin' Stone". His own music publishing company is Wynwood Music.

== Bluegrass Unlimited ==
Bluegrass Unlimited magazine was co-founded by Kuykendall in 1966, with Gary Henderson, Dick Freeland, Dick Spottswood, and volunteers Dianne and Vince Sims. In 1970 he became its editor and has written many articles for it." From 1972 to 1980, Bluegrass Unlimited, i.e. Kuykendall, produced the Indian Springs Bluegrass Festival near Hagerstown, Maryland, 17 times. The International Bluegrass Music Hall of Fame has stated that Bluegrass Unlimited magazine is "a publication affectionately referred to as the 'bible of bluegrass music'".

== Influence ==
Steve Spence, former managing editor at Bluegrass Unlimited, called Kuykendall "one of the foremost authorities on the history of bluegrass" and also said of him: "Kuykendall is as integral a part of the success of bluegrass music over the past five decades as any one person you are likely to find. He has been a performer, a songwriter, a magazine and music publisher, an event promoter, a disc jockey, a record producer, booking agent..." Speaking of Kuykendall and the influence of Bluegrass Unlimited, David Freeman, owner of Rebel Records, said: "When the magazine started publishing, bluegrass was pretty much at a low point. The magazine spread the word and highlighted the artistic aspect of the music, which helped to bring it out of the bars where it was in the 1950s. Without him I don’t know where the bluegrass industry would be today."

== Death ==
Pete Kuykendall died in his sleep in a nursing facility in Warrenton, Virginia, on August 24, 2017 at the age of 90.

== See also ==
Bluegrass Unlimited

== Sources ==
- Rosenberg, Neil V. Bluegrass: A History "Music in American Life" series. University of Illinois Press (1993). ISBN 0-252-06304-X. 447 pp.
