= Bill Emerson (musician) =

American musician (1938–2021)

William Hundley Emerson, Jr. (January 22, 1938 – August 21, 2021) was an American five-string banjo player known for being one of the founding members of the original The Country Gentlemen and Emerson & Waldron and considered one of the finest bluegrass banjo players in music history.

The bluegrass musician named Bill Emerson written about on this biography page is often confused with another country musician named Bill Emerson (known as "Wild Bill Emerson") who was also born in 1938. As a result, bluegrass musician Bill Emerson is frequently incorrectly attributed to songs on various music databases (such as Discogs, AllMusic and Wiki) written by Wild Bill Emerson and/or his wife, Martha Jo "Jody" Emerson (who's often miscredited as "Jodie"). Wild Bill and Jody have written for many country artists such as George Jones, Hank Williams, Jr. and John Anderson.

He was inducted into the International Bluegrass Music Hall of Fame in 2019.

== Career ==
Bill Emerson joined Buzz Busby and the Bayou Boys in the 1950s. In 1957, when Busby was injured in a car accident, Emerson and Charlie Waller – who was also a member of the Bayou Boys – formed The Country Gentlemen. Emerson's stint with the Gentlemen lasted until 1958 when he left the group and began working as a sideman. In 1962, he joined Jimmy Martin's Sunny Mountain Boys where he remained until 1967 with the exception of a brief interlude with Red Allen between 1964–1965. In 1967, Emerson and guitarist Cliff Waldron formed "Emerson & Waldron" recording for Rebel Records. The sound and repertoire of Emerson & Waldron was very similar to The Country Gentlemen often performing songs from contemporary rock, soul and country. Three years later, in 1970, Emerson was back with The Country Gentlemen. In the absence of Emerson, Waldron renamed the group "Cliff Waldron and the New Shades of Grass. While recovering from a February 1972 drive-by shooting following a Country Gentlemen performance at the Red Fox Inn in Bethesda, Maryland, Emerson again left the group. He joined the United States Navy in 1973, attaining the rank of master chief petty officer and performing in both the United States Navy Band and its Country Current bluegrass ensemble for the next twenty years. In 1992, the Stelling Banjo Company issued an Emerson signature banjo model. Emerson died on August 21, 2021, at the age of 83 from complications from pneumonia.

== Discography ==
=== Emerson & Waldron ===
- New Shades of Grass (Rebel, 1968)
- Bluegrass Country (Rebel, 1970)
- Bluegrass Session (Rebel, 1970)

=== Bill Emerson ===
- Banjo Pickin' 'N Hot Fiddlin' (Coronet, 1963)
- Banjo Pickin' 'N Hot Fiddlin' Vol 2 (Coronet, 1964)
- Country Banjo (Design, 1969)
- Home of the Red Fox (Rebel, 1987)
- Gold Plated Banjo (Rebel, 1990)
- Reunion (Webco, 1991)
- Banjo Man (Webco, 1996)
- Eclipse (Rural Rhythm, 2011)

=== Emerson and Goble ===
- Tennessee 1949 (Webco, 1987)
- Dixie In My Eye (Webco, 1989)
- Webco Classics Volume One (Webco, 1995)

=== Bill Emerson & Sweet Dixie ===
- Bill Emerson & the Sweet Dixie Band (Rebel, 2007)
- Southern (Rural Rhythm, 2010)
- The Touch of Time (Rural Rhythm, 2012)
- Dancin' Annie (Rural Rhythm, 2014)
- The Gospel Side of Bill Emerson and Sweet Dixie (Rural Rhythm, 2015)
