= Doyle Lawson =

American bluegrass and gospel musician

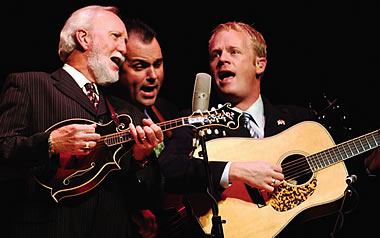
- Lawson (left) and his band harmonize during the 2006 NEA National Heritage Fellows concert.

Background information
- Born: Doyle Wayne Lawson; April 20, 1944 (age 82); Sullivan County, Tennessee, U.S.
- Genres: Bluegrass, gospel
- Occupation: Singer
- Instrument: Mandolin
- Years active: 1963–2021
- Website: www.doylelawson.com

Doyle Wayne Lawson (born April 20, 1944) is an American traditional bluegrass and Southern gospel musician. He is best known as a mandolin player, vocalist, producer, and leader of the 6-man group Doyle Lawson & Quicksilver. Lawson was inducted into the International Bluegrass Music Hall of Fame in 2012.

== Early life ==
Doyle Lawson was born in Fordtown, Sullivan County, Tennessee, the son of Leonard and Minnie Lawson. The Lawson family moved to Sneedville in 1954. Lawson grew up listening to the Grand Ole Opry on Saturday nights. This is where he heard mandolinist Bill Monroe, the "founding father" of bluegrass, and his band the Blue Grass Boys.

Lawson became interested in playing the mandolin around the age of eleven so his father borrowed a mandolin from Willis Byrd, a family friend and fellow musician. Doyle taught himself how to play the mandolin by listening to the radio and records, and watching an occasional TV show. Later Lawson learned to play the guitar and banjo as well.

== Career ==
=== Early career ===
In 1963, aged 18 or 19, Lawson went to Nashville to play the banjo with Jimmy Martin and the Sunny Mountain Boys.

In 1966, he started playing with J.D. Crowe and the Kentucky Mountain Boys (later called the New South) in Lexington, Kentucky. He returned to play the mandolin and sing tenor with Martin in 1969 for six months, and then played again with Crowe until August 1971.

In September 1971, Lawson started playing with The Country Gentlemen and remained part of the band for almost eight years. During that time, in 1977, he backed up U.S. Senator Robert Byrd on his Mountain Fiddler album. In March 1979, Lawson left the Country Gentlemen with the intention of forming a band and creating his own sound.

=== Doyle Lawson & Quicksilver ===
Within a month Lawson had formed Doyle Lawson and Foxfire, with Jimmy Haley on guitar, Lou Reid on bass, and Terry Baucom on banjo. The band name was soon changed to Doyle Lawson and Quicksilver. In 1981, through Sugar Hill Records, Lawson with this lineup released the critically acclaimed Rock My Soul, an album that would become a landmark bluegrass gospel project. With a new bassist, Randy Graham, the band recorded a second gospel album, Heavenly Treasures, also on Sugar Hill.

Shortly thereafter, Graham, Baucom and Haley left to form their own band. Lawson hired guitarist Russell Moore, banjoist Scott Vestal and bassist Curtis Vestal, and continued to perform. After a time Ray Deaton took over on bass.

In 1989 the band won song of the year at the International Bluegrass Music Awards for "Little Mountain Church House". In 1997, There's a Light Guiding Me was a 39th Annual Grammy Award nominee for Best Southern Gospel, Country Gospel or Bluegrass Gospel Album. Through the years, Quicksilver toured regularly, performing at festivals concerts and other musical events.

In 1998, Lawson and Quicksilver became the first bluegrass band to perform at the National Quartet Convention. Lawson and Quicksilver performed in Ontario, Canada at the Tottenham Bluegrass Festival in June 2001 and again in June 2015. Lawson and Quicksilver provided the background vocals to the song "Dazzling Blue" on Paul Simon's 2011 album So Beautiful or So What. In 2015, In Session was nominated for Best Bluegrass Album at the 58th Annual Grammy Awards.

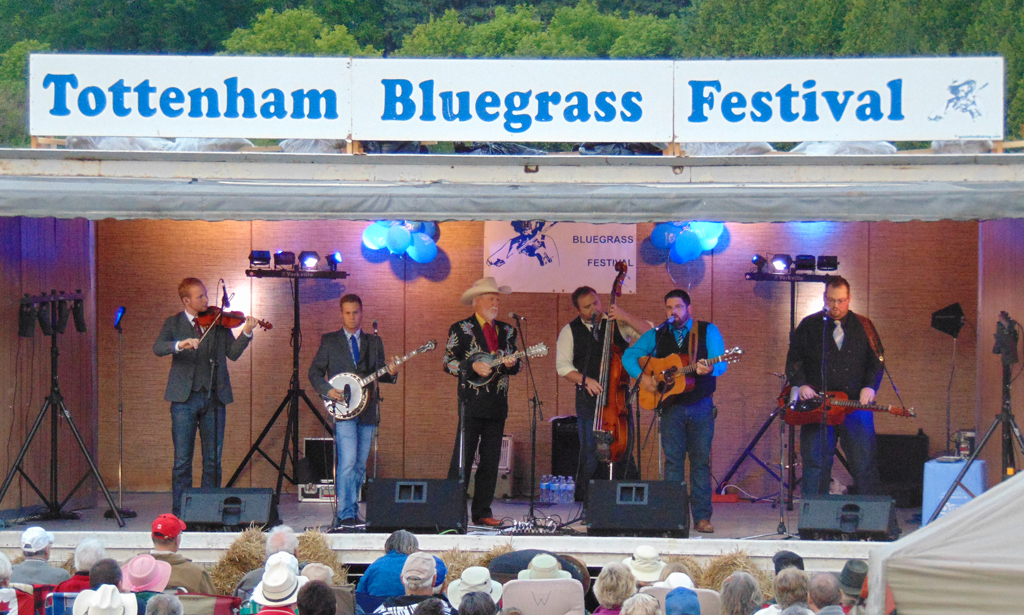
Doyle Lawson and Quicksilver onstage at the 2015 Tottenham Bluegrass Festival in Ontario, Canada

Lawson composed a number of the band's songs and tunes. His instrumental piece "Rosine", is a tribute to Monroe's birthplace and features, among other things, strains from the singer's 1967 instrumental "Kentucky Mandolin". Lawson hosts the annual Doyle Lawson and Quicksilver Festival in Denton, North Carolina. In 2021, Lawson announced his retirement as a bandleader. Doyle Lawson and Quicksilver played their last show in the winter of 2021. In 2026, Doyle Lawson and Quicksilver began playing occasional shows.

== Personal life ==
Doyle has been married to Suzanne Lawson since 1978. He has one son, two daughters, and a grandchild. Doyle rededicated his life to Christianity in May 1985 and is a practicing member of Cold Spring Presbyterian Church.

== Band members ==
Final lineup

- Doyle Lawson — mandolin, mandola, guitar, dojo, lead, baritone and low tenor vocals (1979–2021)
- Eli Johnston — banjo, guitar, bass (2013–2018), lead, baritone and low tenor vocals (2013–2018, 2020–2021)
- Stephen Burwell — fiddle, percussion (2014–2020, 2021)
- Jerry Cole — bass, guitar, percussion, lead, tenor and baritone vocals (2018–2021)
- Ben James — guitar, lead and tenor vocals (2020–2021)
- Matt Flake – fiddle, bass, bass vocals (2020–2021)

== Discography ==
=== Studio albums ===
Year	Album	US Bluegrass	Label
1977	Tennessee Dream		County
1979	Doyle Lawson & Quicksilver		Sugar Hill
1981	Heavenly Treasures		Sugar Hill
1981	Quicksilver Rides Again		Sugar Hill
1981	Rock My Soul		Sugar Hill
1985	Once and for Always		Sugar Hill
1986	Beyond the Shadows		Sugar Hill
1987	The News Is Out		Sugar Hill
1988	Heaven's Joy Awaits		Sugar Hill
1988	Hymn Time in the Country		Sugar Hill
1988	I'll Wander Back Someday		Sugar Hill
1989	I Heard the Angels Singing		Sugar Hill
1990	My Heart Is Yours		Sugar Hill
1991	Merry Christmas from Our House to Your House		Sugar Hill
1992	Pressing on Regardless		Brentwood
1992	Treasures Money Can't Buy		Brentwood
1995	Doyle Lawson with Bobby Hicks & Jerry Douglas		Koch
1995	Never Walk Away		Sugar Hill
1996	There's a Light Guiding Me		Sugar Hill
1997	Kept & Protected		Sugar Hill
1998	Gospel Radio Gems		Sugar Hill
1999	Original Band		Sugar Hill
1999	Winding Through Life		Sugar Hill
2000	Just Over in Heaven		Sugar Hill
2001	Gospel Parade		Sugar Hill
2002	The Hard Game of Love		Sugar Hill
1994	Hallelujah in My Heart		Music Mill
1994	Thank God		Crossroads
2005	You Gotta Dig a Little Deeper	4	Rounder
2006	He Lives in Me	4	Crossroads
2007	More Behind the Picture Than the Wall	2	Rounder
2008	Help Is On the Way	4	Horizon
2009	Lonely Street		Rounder
2010	Light On My Feet, Ready to Fly	11	Horizon
2011	Drive Time	15	Crossroads
2012	Sing Me a Song About Jesus	9	Crossroads
2013	Roads Well Traveled	14	Mountain Home
2014	Open Carefully, Message Inside	10	Mountain Home
2015	In Session	8	Mountain Home
2016	Burden Bearer	4	Mountain Home
2017	Life is a Story		Mountain Home
2019	Live in Prague, Czech Republic		Billy Blue Records
2022	Roundtable		Billy Blue Records

=== Compilation albums ===
Year	Album	US Bluegrass	Label
1990	The Gospel Collection 1		Sugar Hill
1999	A School of Bluegrass	9	Crossroads
1999	Once and for Always/The News Is Out		Sugar Hill
2007	Best of the Sugar Hill Years		Sugar Hill

== Awards ==
Lawson is a recipient of a 2006 National Heritage Fellowship awarded by the National Endowment for the Arts, which is the United States government's highest honor in the folk and traditional arts.

=== International Bluegrass Music Association ===
- 1990 Song of the Year: Doyle Lawson and Quicksilver for "Little Mountain Church"
- 1996 Gospel Recorded Performance of the Year: Doyle Lawson and Quicksilver for "There's a Light Guiding Me"
- 2000 Gospel Recorded Performance of the Year: Doyle Lawson and Quicksilver for "Winding Through Life"
- 2001 Vocal Group of the Year: Doyle Lawson and Quicksilver
- 2002 Vocal Group of the Year: Doyle Lawson and Quicksilver
- 2003 Vocal Group of the Year: Doyle Lawson and Quicksilver
- 2003 Song of the Year: Doyle Lawson and Quicksilver for "Blue Train"
- 2003 Gospel Recorded Performance of the Year: Doyle Lawson and Quicksilver for "Hand Made Cross"
- 2004 Vocal Group of the Year: Doyle Lawson and Quicksilver
- 2005 Vocal Group of the Year: Doyle Lawson and Quicksilver
- 2005 Gospel Recorded Performance of the Year: Doyle Lawson and Quicksilver for "Praise His Name"
- 2006 Vocal Group of the Year: Doyle Lawson and Quicksilver
- 2006 Album of the Year: Celebration of Life: Musicians Against Childhood Cancer, featuring various bluegrass bands and musicians
- 2006 Gospel Recorded Performance of the Year: Doyle Lawson and Quicksilver for "He Lives in Me"
- 2007 Vocal Group of the Year: Doyle Lawson and Quicksilver
- 2007 Gospel Recorded Performance of the Year: Doyle Lawson and Quicksilver for "He Lives in Me"
- 2011 Recorded Event of the Year: Doyle Lawson, J. D. Crowe, Paul Williams for "Prayer Bells of Heaven"
- 2011 Gospel Recorded Performance of the Year: Doyle Lawson, J. D. Crowe, Paul Williams for "Prayer Bells of Heaven"
- 2012 Hall of Fame: Doyle Lawson
