= Eddie Adcock =

American banjoist and guitarist (1938–2025)

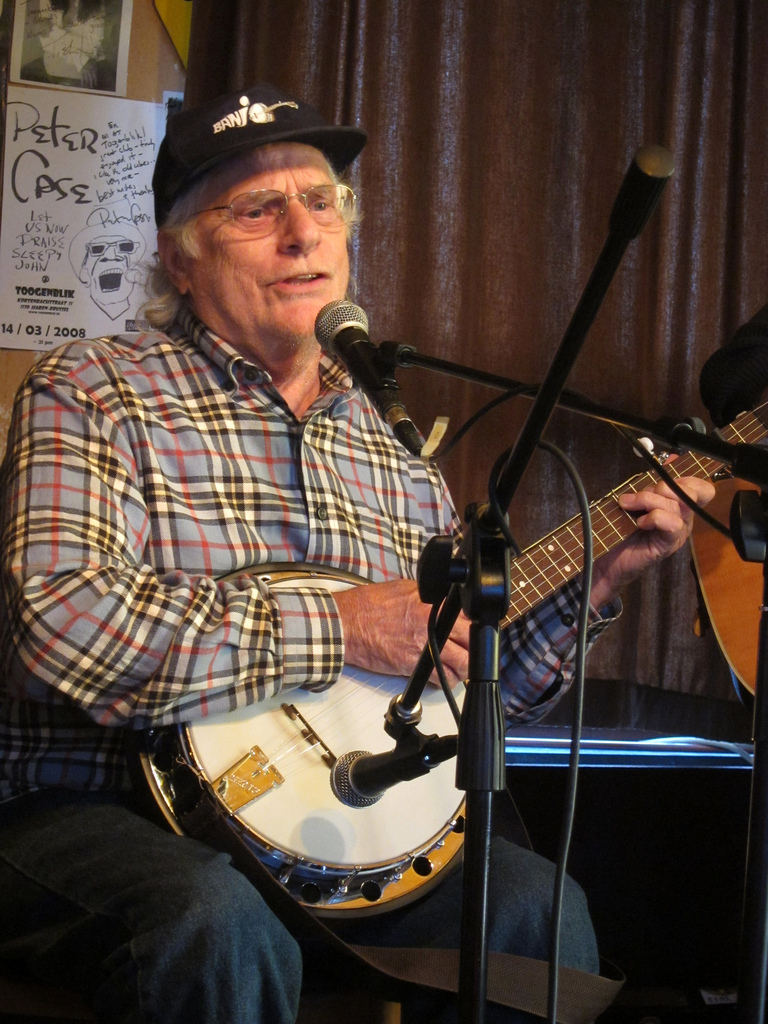
- Adcock in 2012

Background information
- Born: June 21, 1938
- Origin: Scottsville, Virginia, U.S.
- Died: March 20, 2025 (aged 86) Lebanon, Tennessee, U.S.
- Genres: Bluegrass (with jazz, country, folk and rock influences)
- Occupations: Touring and recording instrumentalist / singer, band leader, writer, arranger, record producer / engineer, inventor, ETC
- Instruments: Banjo, guitar, bass, mandolin
- Years active: 1949–2025

Edward Windsor Adcock (June 21, 1938 – March 19, 2025) was an American banjoist and guitarist.

His professional career as a five-string banjoist began in 1953 when he joined Smokey Graves & His Blue Star Boys, who had a regular show at a radio station in Crewe, Virginia. Between 1953 and 1957, he founded or played with different bands in Virginia and Washington, D.C., such as his Virginia Playboys, Smokey Graves and the Blue Star Boys, Bill Harrell, and Mac Wiseman's Country Boys. Bill Monroe offered a job to Adcock in 1958, and he played with the Blue Grass Boys until he could no longer survive on bluegrass' declining pay due to the onslaught of Elvis Presley who cornered all music markets. Adcock continued in music and also returned to working a variety of day jobs including auto mechanic, dump truck driver, and sheet metal mechanic. Then Charlie Waller and John Duffey asked Adcock to join their struggling new band, The Country Gentlemen, whereupon their vocal and instrumental synergy prompted a reinvention and elevation of their sound, soon revitalizing bluegrass music itself. They are the first group to be inducted, in 1996, into the International Bluegrass Music Association's Hall of Fame as a band entity.

Adcock performed with his wife Martha since 1973 in bands II Generation - the first definitively newgrass group - then as Eddie & Martha Adcock, country rock band Adcock, bluegrass' Talk of the Town, The Masters, the Country Gentlemen Reunion Band, and the Eddie Adcock Band, as well as with country outlaw David Allan Coe. Most recently he toured almost exclusively with wife Martha and called Lebanon, Tennessee his home. Adcock belonged to a number of business organizations, including IBMA and the Folk Alliance. He has served on the board of directors of the IBMA, Tennessee Banjo Institute and others. Eddie and Martha also founded and ran Adcock Audio, a large, state-of-the-art sound company, serving bluegrass-related festivals from the early 1970s until 2006, and from that time have also recorded and produced themselves and others both outside and in-house at their own SunFall Studio.

== Early years ==
Adcock was born on June 21, 1938. Learning to play numerous instruments brought into the home by an older brother, young Eddie, with his brother Frank, played and sang as a duo in local churches and on radio stations in nearby Charlottesville. Adcock sold a calf he raised to buy his first banjo as a young teenager and immediately began touring regionally with Smokey Graves. His hobbies were boxing and drag-racing cars. As a racer, Adcock racked up 34 straight wins with his car, which he named Mr. Banjo; he also set two track records at Manassas, Virginia. He also performed various blue-collar jobs to pay the rent. All the while, he played music at night.

== With the Country Gentlemen ==
The Country Gentlemen originated in Washington, D.C. as the result of an automobile accident involving members of singer Buzz Busby's band, which included Adcock. To fulfill upcoming dates, member Bill Emerson called other musicians to step in; and due to the injured members' long recovery times the substitute band decided to stay together, soon naming themselves the Country Gentlemen. The band's original members were Bill Emerson on banjo and baritone vocals, Charlie Waller on guitar and lead vocals, John Duffey on mandolin and tenor vocals, and Larry Lahey on bass. Soon after Adcock's arrival the band settled into an undeniably synergistic lineup consisting of Adcock, Waller, and Duffey, with Tom Gray on bass. This particular lineup, with Adcock serving as sparkplug, became known as the 'classic' Country Gentlemen, the team who drove the bluegrass sound and repertoire to new levels of experimentation, expertise, and excitement. During his tenure with the Country Gentlemen, Adcock adapted thumbstyle, or "Travis-style", guitar finger picking and pedal steel guitar playing to the banjo, which remain unique innovations on the instrument. In addition, his driving, percussive and syncopated jazz-based single-string, soulful string-bending, and lush chordal approaches were at the heart of the group's new-form bluegrass instrumental style, as developed in the interplay between Adcock's mind-blowing fireworks-like innovations, Duffey's jazzy mandolin licks, and Waller's forceful guitar rhythm. Additionally, Adcock's powerful, assertive baritone singing also set a new standard in bluegrass trio singing and became a much-emulated model. The Country Gentlemen's style and repertoire fundamentally changed bluegrass, and the group was notably the first newgrass-slanted band and arguably the forerunner of modern bluegrass as a whole.

== Then Eddie met Martha ==
In 1970, Adcock left The Country Gentlemen and moved to California, where he formed a country-rock band called The Clinton Special. While he performed with the group he used the pseudonym, Clinton Codack. Returning east and forming II Generation, he met Martha Hearon in 1973; they married three years later and have remained partners in music and life. The duo of Eddie and Martha Adcock became known as "the biggest little band in Bluegrass". Cashbox magazine and Billboard magazine have both named them "one of the Bluegrass circuit's top acts". Eddie and Martha have recorded a number of well-received albums on several labels and concentrate on performing as a duo, as well as playing some concerts with bassist Tom Gray. Eddie and Martha, have appeared on Austin City Limits, Song of the Mountains, Grassroots to Bluegrass, Ernest Tubb's Midnite Jamboree, TNN's 'Nashville Now' and Wildhorse Saloon, and a host of NPR specials, as well as syndicated, Internet, and local TV and radio shows worldwide. Their video Dog aired on TNN, CMT, and CNN.

He did several "Classic Country Gentlemen" reunion concerts with Waller, Duffy, and Tom Gray. In 1989, they recorded and released the album "Classic Country Gents Reunion" featuring many of their old hits.

== Illness and death ==
In October 2008, concerns about hand-tremors, which could have compromised his performing career, led to Adcock having deep brain stimulation (DBS) surgery at Vanderbilt University Medical Center. A local anesthetic having been used during the surgery so that he could remain conscious, he was able to play banjo during the procedure in order to check the effectiveness of the treatment in progress. The surgery is the first to have been performed on a musician for the purpose of restoring his professional-level playing ability.

Adcock died in Lebanon, Tennessee on March 19, 2025, at the age of 86.
