= Rebel Records =

Record label

- Founded: 1959
- Founder: Dick Freeland; Bill Carroll; Sonny Compton
- Genre: Bluegrass, old time
- Country of origin: U.S.
- Location: Charlottesville, Virginia
- Official website: rebelrecords.com

Rebel Records is an independent American record label based in Charlottesville, Virginia that specializes in bluegrass and old time music. The label was founded in Mount Rainier, Maryland in 1959 by Dick Freeland, Bill Carroll and Sonny Compton. In 1980, Freeland sold the label to David Freeman, the founder of County Records. Freeman later handed over management of the label to his son Mark Freeman. Rebel has more than 340 titles in print by more than 50 different artists and groups, and continues to release several new titles each year.

== Notable artists ==
- Bill Emerson
- Bill Grant and Delia Bell
- Bill Harrell
- Blue Highway
- Butch Baldassari
- Charlie Sizemore
- Chris Jones
- Cliff Waldron
- Cody Kilby
- Dave Evans
- David Davis
- David Parmley
- Del McCoury
- Don Rigsby
- Don Stover
- Forbes Family
- Front Porch String Band
- IIIrd Tyme Out
- J. D. Crowe
- Jimmy Gaudreau
- Joe Greene
- Joe Mullins
- John Starling
- Junior Sisk
- Karl Shiflett
- Keith Whitley
- Kenny Smith
- King Wilkie
- Larry Rice
- Larry Sparks
- Lilly Brothers
- Lost & Found
- Lou Reid
- Mark Newton
- Melvin Goins
- Paul Adkins
- Paul Williams
- Perfect Strangers
- Ralph Stanley II
- Ralph Stanley
- Reno and Smiley
- Rhonda Vincent
- Richard Bennett
- Ricky Skaggs
- Rock County
- Ronnie Bowman
- Seldom Scene
- Stanley Brothers
- Steep Canyon Rangers
- The Country Gentlemen
- Tony Holt
- Tony Rice
- The Traditional Grass

== See also ==
- List of record labels
