= Charlie Waller (American musician) =

American singer and guitarist

- Born: Charles Otis Waller; January 19, 1935; Joinerville, Texas, US
- Died: August 18, 2004 (aged 69)
- Genres: Bluegrass
- Occupation: Singer
- Instrument: Guitar
- Years active: 1956–2004
- Labels: Folkways, Starday, Vanguard, Rebel, Sugar Hill, Pinecastle
- Formerly of: The Country Gentlemen
- Website: Charlie Waller website

Charles Otis Waller (January 19, 1935 – August 18, 2004) was the lead singer and guitarist for the bluegrass band The Country Gentlemen. Waller was involved with the band for 47 years and was inducted into the International Bluegrass Music Hall of Honor in 1996 and the Southern Gospel Museum and Hall of Fame in 2009.

== Biography ==
Waller was born in Joinerville, Texas and moved to Lake Charles, Louisiana at the age of 2 with his family. He began to play guitar at the age of 10 and moved with his mother to Baltimore, Maryland. In 1952, Waller joined Earl Taylor's bluegrass band, the Stoney Mountain Boys. Waller returned to Louisiana in 1956 as a guitar player with Buzz Busby and the Bayou Boys, making several appearances on television. In 1957 he and Busby returned to the Washington, D.C. area, where Waller met mandolinist John Duffey and banjo player Bill Emerson. When Busby was injured in an auto accident in July 1957, Emerson formed a temporary band with Waller and Duffey to fulfill Busby's bookings. The temporary band soon became permanent, and The Country Gentlemen would continue for more than fifty years.

The Country Gentlemen achieved fame across the United States and internationally, including performing in Japan in 1971. While more than 100 musicians have been members at one time or another, Waller was always in the group and has many famous songs to his credit. Waller was held in high regard for his singing ability, especially on songs like "Legend of the Rebel Soldier", "Two Little Boys", "House of the Rising Sun", and many others. Though Waller usually played rhythm guitar, he flatpicked lead on some songs, such as "Under the Double Eagle", "Spanish Two Step"', and "Electricity" among others. The band released a new album, Songs of the American Spirit, in September 2004.

On August 18, 2004 Charlie Waller suffered a heart attack and died at his Gordonsville, Virginia home. A month before his death, Waller told his bus driver Kenny Wurzburger that he had a pain in his liver. An autopsy revealed that Waller was in the early stages of liver cancer at the time of his death.
