= The Country Gentlemen =

American progressive bluegrass band

- Country Gentlemen at Carlton Haney's festival, Camp Springs, NC in 1971. L-R Bill Emerson, Doyle Lawson, Bill Yates, Charlie Waller

Background information
- Origin: Washington, D.C., United States
- Genres: Progressive bluegrass
- Years active: 1957–2004
- Labels: Folkways, Smithsonian Folkways, Starday, Vanguard, Rebel, Sugar Hill, Design, Mercury, Copper Creek, Freeland, Pinecastle, Seven Seas
- Past members: 1st classic lineup Charlie Waller; John Duffey; Eddie Adcock; Tom Gray; 2nd classic lineup Charlie Waller; Bill Emerson; Doyle Lawson; Bill Yates; Greg Corbett list of all past members

The Country Gentlemen was a progressive bluegrass band that originated during the 1950s in the area of Washington, D.C., United States, and recorded and toured with various members until the death in 2004 of Charlie Waller, one of the group's founders who in its later years served as the group's leader.

The classic line-up from 1960 to 1964 consisted of co-founders Charlie Waller on guitar and John Duffey on mandolin, with Eddie Adcock on banjo and Tom Gray on bass. They were inducted into the International Bluegrass Music Hall of Honor in 1996.

== Early history ==
The band started on July 4, 1957 as a replacement group for Buzz Busby and the Bayou Boys when several members of that band were injured in a car accident. The band's original members were Charlie Waller on guitar and lead vocals, John Duffey on mandolin and tenor vocals, Bill Emerson on banjo and baritone vocals, and Larry Lahey on bass. After a few early changes, the band settled into a somewhat permanent lineup consisting of Waller, Duffey, Eddie Adcock on banjo, and Tom Gray on bass.

== First classic lineup breakup ==
Country Gentlemen reunion at Woodstock '92. L-R: Eddie Adcock, John Duffey, Charlie Waller, Tom Gray

They toured both the bluegrass and folk circuits during the 1950s and 1960s. In 1964, Tom Gray left the group to pursue his career as National Geographic cartographer. Until end of sixties, Ed Ferris, Ed McGlothlin and Bill Yates were the bass players for the group. In 1969, just as the band was scheduled to tour Japan, John Duffey quit, citing his fear of flying. Jimmy Gaudreau was brought in on mandolin. Doyle Lawson went to Japan and played the mandolin and sang on the live recorded album for the group's first trip to Japan. Eddie Adcock left the band in 1970 and moved to California to create a band, Clinton Special.

== Second generation ==
Charlie Waller assembled the "second classic lineup" of the Country Gentlemen soon after, with Bill Emerson returning on banjo, Lawson on mandolin, Bill Yates on bass and Ricky Skaggs on fiddle. The band also switched labels from Rebel to Vanguard. Emerson left again to join the Navy after one album, and was replaced by James Bailey. Jerry Douglas joined the band on Dobro during the summer of 1973 and stayed with the band after graduating from high school in May 1974. He continued with the band until June 1975. He rejoined the band in May 1978 and was with the band until December 1978. Lawson left in 1979 to form his own band.

== Death of Charlie Waller ==
In the band's later years Charlie Waller served as the group's "focal point and leader" until his death in August 2004. His son Randy Waller, whose voice is very similar to his father's, continues to play as "Randy Waller & The Country Gentlemen".

== Material ==
The Country Gentlemen play music ranging from traditional bluegrass to pop, sometimes adapting music from other genres to their bluegrass style. They also borrowed from singer-songwriters, with songs such as Gordon Lightfoot's "Redwood Hill" and Steve Goodman's "City of New Orleans."

Several of the band's songs ("Two Little Boys," "Bringing Mary Home," "New Freedom Bell," "Matterhorn," "Fox on the Run," "Legend of the Rebel Soldier," and many others) have become bluegrass standards.

== Offshoots ==
Some of the immediate offshoots of the band were Emerson & Waldron, the Seldom Scene, II Generation, and Doyle Lawson & Quicksilver.

In 2008, Adcock and Gray, two members of the "Classic" Country Gentlemen Hall of Honor lineup, together with former member Gaudreau and Waller's son Randy, combined in 2008 to record as the Country Gentlemen Reunion Band.
