= Mountain City Fiddlers Convention =

String-based instrument conference

The Mountain City Fiddlers Convention was held in the East Tennessee town of Mountain City, in May 1925. The gathering was attended by many acclaimed Appalachian musicians, and pioneers of bluegrass and country music, such as G. B. Grayson, Charlie Bowman, and Al Hopkins. The contest helped to define the music of East Tennessee, and along with the Bristol recording sessions of 1927, and the Johnson City sessions of 1928 and 1929, it is regarded as one of the events which helped to launch the modern country music industry.

Dudley Vance, of Bluff City, Tennessee, won first prize, with his performance of "Twinkle Little Star". G. B. Grayson, born in 1887, and a native of Johnson County, was also a prize winner for his version of Cumberland Gap.

== Music festivals inspired by the original ==
The Mountain City convention has been the inspiration for other festivals and competitions, each featuring fiddlers and other old-time musicians.

=== Old Time Fiddler's Convention ===
The Old Time Fiddler's Convention takes place in the nearby town of Laurel Bloomery, and is held the Saturday before Labor Day weekend at the Old Mill Music Park. It commemorates the annual anniversary of the 1925 gathering. Local, regional, and international musicians travel to attend this festival, which is marked with old time folk and bluegrass music.

=== Upper East Tennessee Fiddler's Convention ===
In late April, 2017, the first annual Upper East Tennessee Fiddler's Convention was held in the community of Flag Pond, in Unicoi County, Tennessee. Among other goals, the event helps support Rocky Fork State Park.
