= Music of East Tennessee =

The Music of East Tennessee has a rich history, and played a major role in the development of modern country and bluegrass music. Bristol, known as "the birthplace of country music", (and home of the Birthplace of Country Music Museum), and Johnson City, notable for the Johnson City recording sessions, are both towns in the Tri-Cities region of East Tennessee. The music of East Tennessee is defined by country, gospel, and bluegrass artists, and has roots in Appalachian folk music.

== History ==
=== Pioneers in the Great Smoky Mountains ===
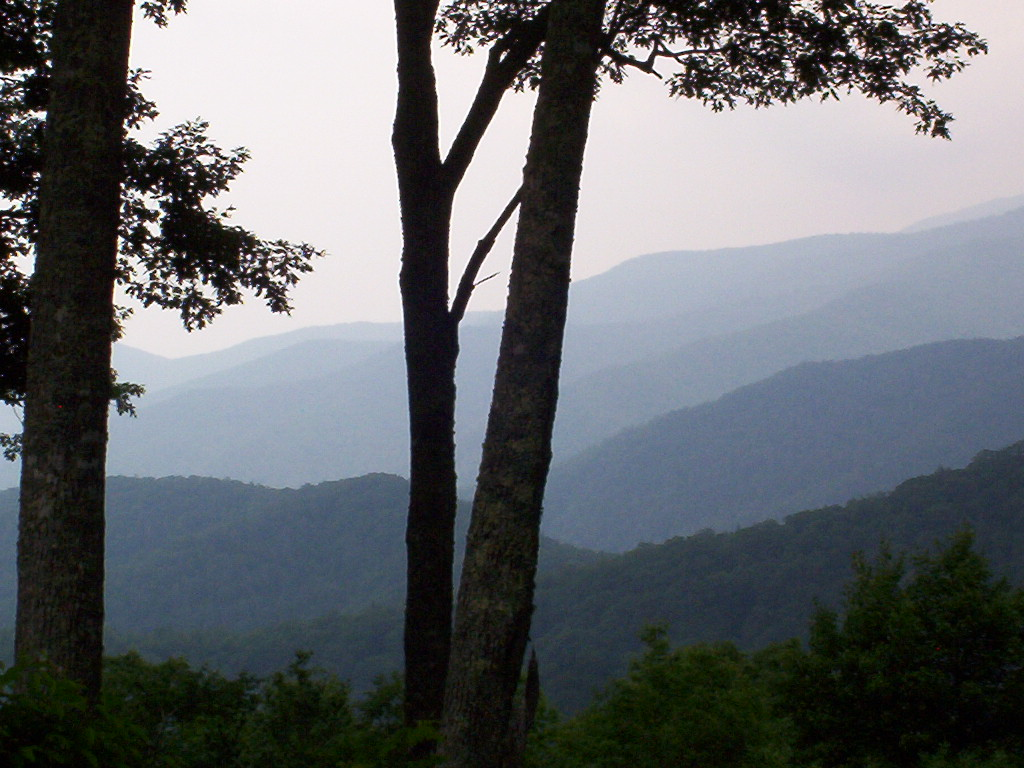
The Great Smoky Mountains near Gatlinburg, Tennessee

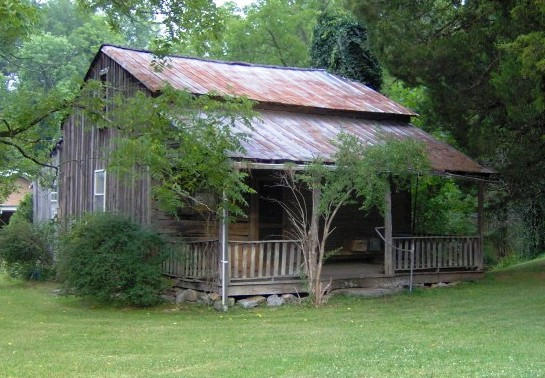
The Peter Brickey House, a pioneer home in Wears Valley, in the Great Smoky Mountains of Tennessee

Pioneer settlers of the Great Smoky Mountains created old-time music ballads, before their relocation, by the creation of Great Smoky Mountains National Park. To help celebrate this heritage, Townsend, Gatlinburg, Pigeon Forge, and other locations in the Great Smoky Mountains, host annual festivals, some of which feature folk and bluegrass music. The Great Smoky Mountains Association also promotes events with mountain music, and has released several award-winning albums, including: Old-Time Smoky Mountain Music, Old-Time Bluegrass from the Great Smoky Mountains, On Top of Old Smoky, and Big Bend Killing. The Great Smoky Mountains Heritage Center, in Townsend, also helps to preserve this pioneer cultural history. In addition, the Museum of Appalachia, in Norris, hosts occasional folk music performances.

=== Mountain City Fiddlers Convention ===
In May 1925, the now-legendary Fiddlers' Convention was held in Mountain City. Pioneering fiddler G. B. Grayson won first prize for his rendering of the folk song, "Cumberland Gap", besting rivals Ambrose G. "Uncle Am" Stuart, Charlie Bowman, and Fiddlin' John Carson.

==== Cumberland Gap ====
The song was named for Cumberland Gap, a narrow pass through the Cumberland Mountains, which was explored by Daniel Boone in the 1770s, as he blazed the Wilderness Road. In recognition of this heritage, the town of Cumberland Gap, Tennessee, hosts the monthly "Cumberland Mountain Music Show", with live gospel, bluegrass, and country music.

==== Laurel Bloomery festival ====
To commemorate the Mountain City Fiddlers' Convention, the nearby community of Laurel Bloomery hosts the annual Old Time Fiddler's Convention. The event is held every summer, at the town's Old Mill Music Park. Area musicians travel to attend this festival, which features old-time folk and bluegrass music.

=== Bristol sessions ===
The Bristol recording sessions, held in 1927, have been called by some the "Big Bang" of modern country music. They helped launch the careers of Jimmie Rodgers and the Carter Family, among others. In 1998, the U.S. Congress formally recognized Bristol as the "Birthplace of Country Music", and the Birthplace of Country Music Museum opened in 2014.

=== Johnson City sessions ===
Though less-known than the Bristol sessions, the Johnson City sessions, of 1928 and 1929, also played a significant role in helping to popularize country and bluegrass music. Some recordings from the Johnson City sessions influenced such later musicians as Bob Dylan and Doc Watson.

=== Knoxville sessions ===
In 1929 and 1930, a series of recording sessions was held in Knoxville. Some historians say that these, also, influenced early country music. The sessions are documented at the East Tennessee Historical Society's East Tennessee History Center, which is also located in Knoxville.

=== The Oak Ridge Boys ===
The Oak Ridge Boys, of Oak Ridge, are one of the oldest and best-known musical acts from East Tennessee. Since the 1940s, they have sung country and southern gospel music hits.

=== Dolly Parton and Dollywood ===
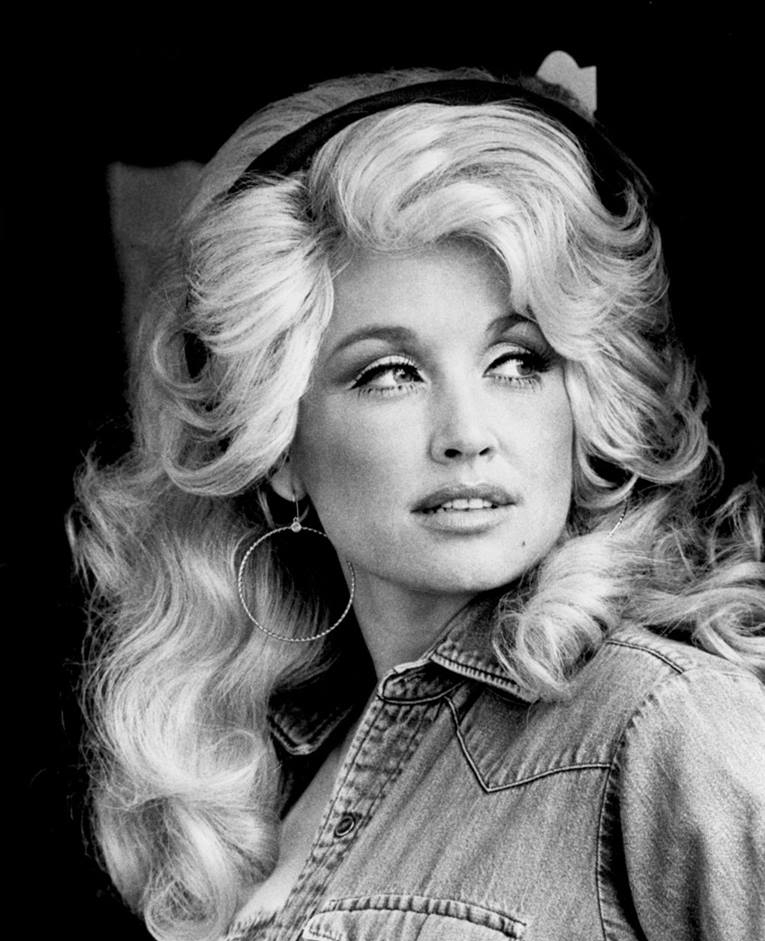
Dolly Parton, pictured in 1977, is known as the "Queen of Country".

Dolly Parton, from Sevierville, was a country and gospel music legend, known as the "Queen of Country". Her theme park, Dollywood (located in nearby Pigeon Forge), features live music performances, and is home to the Southern Gospel Museum and Hall of Fame. Parton's western-themed Dolly Parton's Stampede, a dinner theater restaurant (also in Pigeon Forge), has daily shows as well. Parton is known both nationally and internationally as a personification of Tennessee.

=== Country Tonite Theater ===
The Country Tonite Theater, in Pigeon Forge, has operated since 1996. Its award-winning shows have included performers such as Loretta Lynn, Brenda Lee, and The Bellamy Brothers.

=== Songs inspired by East Tennessee ===
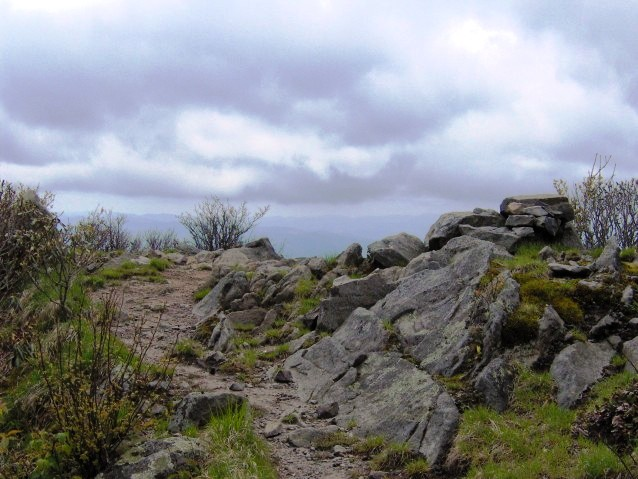
Rocky Top, part of the larger Thunderhead Mountain, near Gatlinburg

Places in East Tennessee have been the inspiration for many songs. Perhaps the most well-known is Rocky Top. Released by the Osbourne Brothers in 1967, it is one of the ten state songs of Tennessee. Though often performed at Tennessee Volunteers football games, it is not the official fight song of the University of Tennessee (Down the Field). In addition, Rocky Top, Tennessee is now a town, northwest of Knoxville, which changed its name from Lake City in 2014.

Ronnie Milsap's 1980 song, Smoky Mountain Rain, is also one of Tennessee's state songs. Dolly Parton's hit, My Tennessee Mountain Home, served as the centerpiece of her 1973 album, My Tennessee Mountain Home. Parton also reminisced on her rural childhood in her 1984 song, Tennessee Homesick Blues.

East Tennessee Blues, written in 1926 by Charlie Bowman, (from Gray), continues to be a popular bluegrass song.

Please Come to Boston, recorded and written in 1974 by Dave Loggins, has been covered by many artists, including David Allan Coe and Joan Baez. The song concludes with the line, "I'm the number one fan of the man from Tennessee." Loggins, born in Mountain City in 1947, is the second cousin of singer Kenny Loggins.

Chattanooga Choo Choo, originally published in 1941, tells the story of a train trip to Chattanooga. In 1957, the British musician Lonnie Donegan had a No. 1 UK hit with a skiffle version of "Cumberland Gap". In addition, Dixieland Delight, released by Alabama in 1983, was inspired by a highway drive through Rutledge, Tennessee.

==== Davy Crockett ====
The Ballad of Davy Crockett helped to popularize the 1955 film Davy Crockett, King of the Wild Frontier. First recorded and introduced on the television series Disneyland in 1954, it has been covered by a number of artists, most notably Tennessee Ernie Ford. The song's lyrics say Crockett was "born on a mountaintop in Tennessee", but his actual birthplace was Limestone, Tennessee, the home of Davy Crockett Birthplace State Park. In addition to his renowned frontier exploits and military service, Crockett served East Tennessee as a state legislator and Congressman.

==== Daniel Boone ====
The folk hero Daniel Boone, who helped explore East Tennessee, was honored in the soundtrack for the television series Daniel Boone, which ran from 1964 until 1970. The last of three versions of the theme song was sung by The Imperials, a Grammy-winning Christian music group.

==== Ruby Falls ====
Ruby Falls, a waterfall inside the Lookout Mountain Caverns, has inspired multiple songs. Johnny Cash and Roy Orbison wrote and recorded the song "See Ruby Falls", on Cash's 1970 album Hello, I'm Johnny Cash. Country artist Ray Stevens also included a song named "Ruby Falls" on his 2011 album, Bozos's Back Again.

==== Kenny Chesney ====
Country superstar Kenny Chesney, (originally from Luttrell), has described scenery from his East Tennessee youth in many of his songs, especially I Go Back. Chesney also includes imagery from the area in songs such as Back Where I Come From, (performed at many of his concerts), and The Boys of Fall, as well as "Touchdown, Tennessee", a limited-edition single, which was released in 1998.

=== Regional museums and heritage centers ===
East Tennessee has an impressive number of museums, which comprehensively document the region's contributions to country and bluegrass music:

- Birthplace of Country Music Museum, in Bristol
- Southern Gospel Museum and Hall of Fame, in Pigeon Forge
- Mountain Music Museum, in Kingsport
- Great Smoky Mountains Heritage Center, in Townsend
- Museum of Appalachia, in Norris
- Museum of East Tennessee History, in Knoxville
- Cradle of Country Music Park, in Knoxville

== Music festivals ==
The music of East Tennessee is celebrated throughout the region at annual festivals. The Museum of Appalachia hosts the Tennessee Fall Homecoming each October. The four-day event has featured headliners such as Doc Watson, Ralph Stanley, Mac Wiseman, Janette Carter, and Rhonda Vincent. The Kingsport "Fun Fest" is held each July, and has included Charlie Daniels, as well as The Newsboys, among others. Heritage Days, a street festival event, is hosted each October, in Rogersville. The Shady Valley Cranberry Festival, also in October, has live country, bluegrass and gospel entertainment.

== East Tennessee State University Bluegrass, Old-Time, and Roots Music program ==
East Tennessee State University, in Johnson City, is the only four-year university in the world with a comprehensive bluegrass music program. The program includes faculty members who have worked with major recording artists, such as Kenny Chesney (an ETSU alumnus).

== Current stars ==
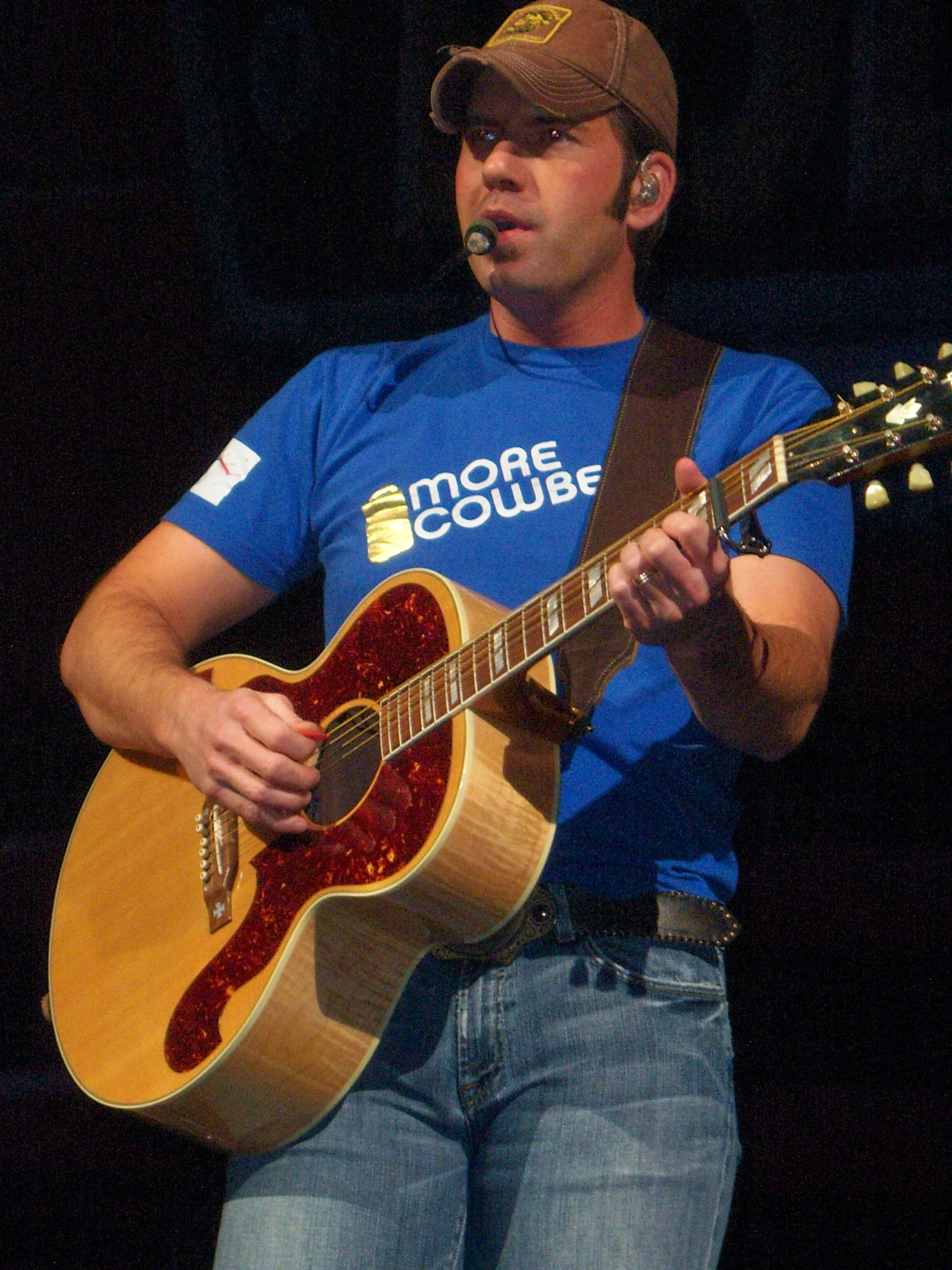
Rodney Atkins, originally from Cumberland Gap

Artists from East Tennessee, such as Dolly Parton, Kenny Chesney, Rodney Atkins, Morgan Wallen and Ashley Monroe, continue to help define the country music industry. Greeneville is home to The Band Perry, also features occasional performances by the group.

== See also ==
- Christian country music
- The Ford Show, which ran on NBC from 1956 until 1961; hosted by Tennessee Ernie Ford (originally from Bristol)
- Christy, a series of musicals,
- Dolly Parton's Coat of Many Colors, a 2015 NBC television film; inspired by her 1971 song and album of the same name
- Dolly Parton's Christmas of Many Colors: Circle of Love, a 2016 sequel film, which also appeared on NBC
- Crooked Road, Virginia, a country and folk music Heritage Trail, running across Southwest Virginia
- Blue Ridge Music Center, a museum and performance venue, on the Blue Ridge Parkway near Galax, Virginia
- Music of West Virginia
- Cradle of Country Music Park
