= Gaither Carlton =

American musician

Gaither Wiley Carlton (February 3, 1901 – June 24, 1972) was an American Old-time fiddle player and banjo player. He is best known for his appearances accompanying his son-in-law Doc Watson during the folk music revival of the 1960s. While not recorded before the folk revival, Carlton had been playing with some of the region's most well-known musicians— such as Al Hopkins, G. B. Grayson, and Clarence Ashley— since the 1920s.

Carlton was born in Wilkes County, North Carolina in 1901. His father was an accomplished local musician, and the family often played at church events and other gatherings. In 1960, folk music producer Ralph Rinzler "rediscovered" Clarence Ashley at the Union Grove Fiddler's Convention, and offered to re-record Ashley at Ashley's home in Shouns, Tennessee. Ashley invited Carlton, Doc Watson (who was married to Carlton's daughter Rosa Lee Carlton), and several other bandmates to join in the sessions, which took place on Labor Day weekend in 1960. Carlton accompanied Watson and Ashley to a recording session in Saltville, Virginia the following year, and to subsequent recording sessions and folk festivals throughout the remainder of the decade. He died at his home in Deep Gap, North Carolina in 1972.

Carlton played banjo in the clawhammer style similar to Ashley. His fiddle style resembles that of his friend G.B. Grayson and Gid Tanner. His banjo recordings include "Rambling Hobo", which Rinzler described as reminiscent of Carlton's "peaceful, centered nature", and "Old Ruben", which he learned from his brother. His fiddle recordings include "I'm Going Back to Jericho", which he recalled learning from a neighbor, and "Handsome Molly", which he learned from G.B. Grayson. In 1961, Carlton played fiddle on a memorable recording of the traditional mountain tune "Hicks' Farewell", which Rinzler called "one of the most powerful pieces of recorded music I know."
