= Clint Howard and Fred Price =

American old-time musicians associated with Doc Watson

Clint Howard (1930 – October 16, 2011) and Fred Price (July 16, 1915 – September 13, 1987) were American old-time musicians from Mountain City, Johnson County, Tennessee. They performed and recorded as part of the string band built around Clarence Ashley and Doc Watson in the early 1960s.

Howard played guitar and sang while Price was a fiddler, and the two performed together throughout their careers. The Folkways recordings they made with Ashley and Watson helped introduce traditional Appalachian music to the folk revival audience. The recordings were selected for the National Recording Registry of the Library of Congress in 2012. The two have also been documented in scholarly studies of Appalachian traditional music, including an essay on Howard in the Appalachian Journal.

== Background ==
Both men came from the Mountain City area of Johnson County which is located in northeastern Tennessee near the North Carolina home of Doc Watson with whom they would often perform.

Clint Howard, born William Clinton Howard, learned to sing from his mother when he was about six years old and was given his first guitar by his father at age eleven. He turned professional at about twenty-two and sang lead. Away from music, he made his living as a welder, working at the shipyard in Newport News, Virginia, and later at Maymead, where he retired in 1990. He also at various times drove a school bus and raised corn, beans, and cattle.

Fred Price taught himself the fiddle beginning at the age of fifteen when his father brought one home. He learned to play "The Little Log Cabin in the Lane" before supper that same evening. His playing preserved the old-time fiddle style of 1920s string bands.

== Career ==
In the late 1950s Howard and Price were playing around Johnson County with the banjoist and singer Clarence Ashley, who had recorded commercially in the 1920s and 1930s. The folklorist Ralph Rinzler rediscovered Ashley at the 1960 Union Grove Fiddlers' Convention and a few months later recorded his group. The group included Ashley, Howard, Price, and the young, then-unknown guitarist Doc Watson. Because Howard played rhythm guitar, Watson became the band's lead guitarist.

Howard and Price appear on Old Time Music at Clarence Ashley's, Volumes 1 and 2 (Folkways Records FA 2355 and FA 2359, 1961 and 1963), reissued in 1994 as The Original Folkways Recordings of Doc Watson and Clarence Ashley, 1960–1962.

With Doc Watson the two performed widely during the 1960s, including at the Newport Folk Festival (1963), Carnegie Hall, and the University of California.

In 1972, Howard and Price recorded an album under their own names, joined by their sons. Titled The Ballad of Finley Preston, it was released by Rounder Records as catalog number 0009. The title ballad tells the story of Finley Preston, who was hanged in 1905 and is thought to have been the last man legally hanged in Tennessee.

The trio of Watson, Howard, and Price recorded Old Timey Concert for Vanguard Records, a collaboration Watson later named as one of his personal favorites. A track credited to "Fred Price with Clint Howard," "Richmond Blues," appears in the Smithsonian Folkways catalog. Howard and Price appeared with Doc Watson on episode 12 of Pete Seeger's television series Rainbow Quest (1965–66).

== Later life ==
Fred Price died on September 13, 1987. His passing was noted in the old-time music journal The Old-Time Herald.

Clint Howard continued to perform into later life. He appeared at the Smithsonian Institution, the 1982 World's Fair in Knoxville, and, in the 1990s and 2000s, at MerleFest, often with Doc Watson. His work influenced musicians including the Kruger Brothers who called him "one of the nation's greatest treasures". He died at his home in Johnson County on October 16, 2011, at the age of 80, and was buried in Reece Cemetery.

== Legacy ==
The recordings Howard and Price made with Clarence Ashley and Doc Watson are an early work of east Tennessee old-time music. Music writer Richard Carlin has observed that to call them influential "is a vast understatement". The folklorist Richard Blaustein made Howard the focus of an essay in the Appalachian Journal, The group is documented in Thomas G. Burton's study Tom Ashley, Sam McGee, Bukka White: Tennessee Traditional Singers.

The legacy of Howard, Price, Ashley, and Watson is commemorated in a series of murals in Mountain City known as the Musical Mural Mile. There is also a celebration each year at the town's Long Journey Home festival, whose heritage tour includes the Fred Price Homeplace. Howard and Price were also part of the Ashley group brought to urban audiences through the Friends of Old Time Music concerts in New York (1961–1965).

== Discography ==
- Old Time Music at Clarence Ashley's, Vols. 1–2 (Folkways, 1961 and 1963; reissued 1994 by Smithsonian Folkways as The Original Folkways Recordings of Doc Watson and Clarence Ashley, 1960–1962)
- The Ballad of Finley Preston (Rounder, 1972)
- Old Timey Concert (Vanguard), recorded with Doc Watson
