= East Tennessee Blues =

1926 folk song

East Tennessee Blues is an American old-time fiddle song, which dates back to the early 20th century.

Written by Charlie Bowman (born in Gray Station, in East Tennessee), it was first recorded by Al Hopkins, (aka The Hill Billies) in 1926. Well-known bluegrass artists, such as Bill Monroe, Doc Watson, and Tommy Jackson have released versions of the song. A mainstay of bluegrass music, the song continues to be performed by singers such as Sierra Hull and the Steep Canyon Rangers, as well as the East Tennessee State University Bluegrass Pride Band.

== See also ==
- Music of East Tennessee
- Appalachian music
