= Frank Buckley Walker =

Talent agent

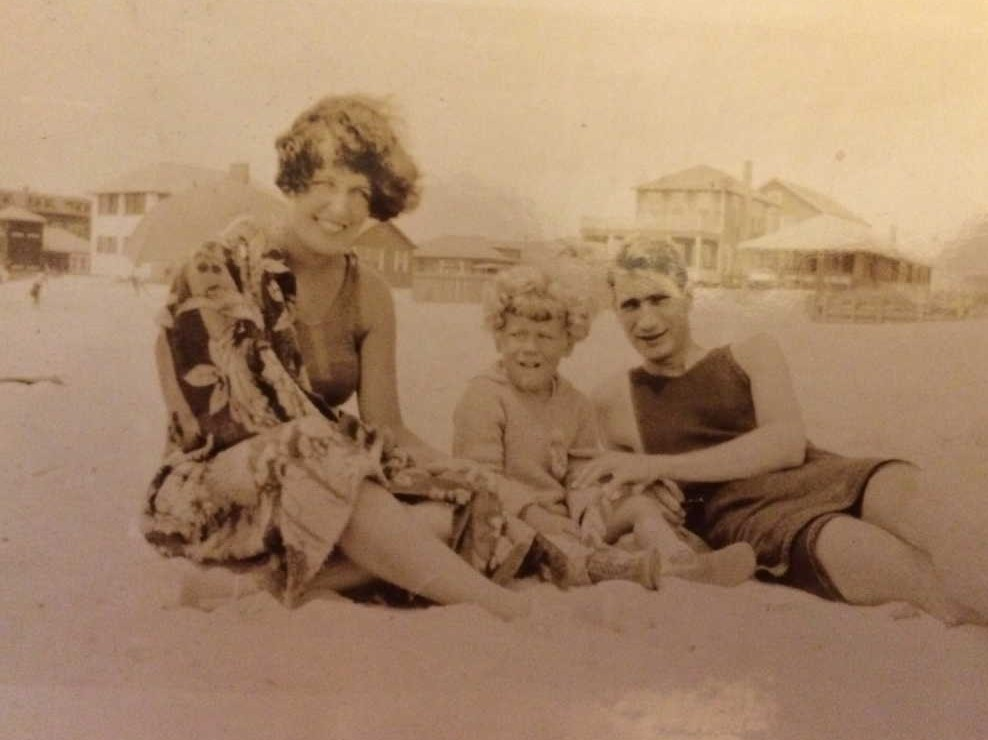
- Walker with wife Laura and son John on a beach trip to Wantagh, New York in 1924
- Born: Francis Buckley Walker; October 24, 1889; Cambridge, New York, U.S.
- Died: October 15, 1963 (aged 73); Little Neck, New York, U.S.
- Occupations: A & R Head For Columbia Records; A & R Head For RCA Victor Records; Co-founder of MGM Records
- Relatives: Jim Vienneau (nephew)

Francis Buckley Walker (October 24, 1889 – October 15, 1963) was an American talent agent and author from the New York City area. Some of his talent discoveries included country music singer Hank Williams, blues singer Bessie Smith and banjoist Samantha Bumgarner.

He is known for running the Johnson City sessions from 1928 to 1929, which launched the careers of various artists including Charlie Bowman and Clarence Ashley. In 1923, Walker became the head of A&R for Columbia Records and RCA Victor. His career as a talent agent lasted for over 40 years until his death in 1963.

== Early life ==
Frank Walker was born on a farm in rural Fly Summit, a hamlet in Cambridge, New York, on October 24, 1889. He was the youngest of seven children born to Mary Ann Buckley (August 13, 1851 – April 25, 1922) and Solomon Walker (June 14, 1852 – November 6, 1895). Frank and his brothers, Lester, George, Mack and Ed worked on the farm as children and helped with income for the family. They especially helped when their father died of consumption when Frank was only six. He disliked working on the farm as a child apparently because of the long hours of work and the hard labor. He left home when he was 18 and took up a job in a bank in Albany. Eventually he became assistant manager and stayed in Albany for five years.

== Career ==
In 1913, Frank Walker was offered a Wall Street job in New York City for a politician, this job he held until 1916 when he was drafted during World War I into the Navy. After his military service, he went back out looking for a new job in 1919. A chance encounter with a man named Francis Whiten who had connections with the owners of the Columbia Phonograph Company. This was a job in which he discovered his enthusiasm for country music and for his newfound career. He was eventually promoted to a talent agent and first went to the South in 1923 looking for talent meeting the Columbia A&R Atlanta Georgia's Dan Hornsby, after his promotion to head of the race division at Columbia Records. His first priority on mind was to find a talented blues singer he heard back in 1917 at a gin mill in Selma, Alabama. With promoter Clarence Williams and Dan Hornsby’s help, he found the woman, Bessie Smith and brought her up to New York City to record the soon-to-be smash hit Down Hearted Blues. This would be the first of many hit discoveries for Frank Walker as he continued to succeed in his profession. Walker was responsible for discovering and recording Blind Willie Johnson, Joe Falcon and the Breaux Family. In the late 1920s, the Johnson City Sessions in Tennessee led to many more successful country music artists. They included Bill and Belle Reed, Clarence Ashley, the Bently Boys, Ira and Eugene Yates and several others. In the years following this successful venture, he became the head of RCA Victor Records and continued signing artists there in the 1930s and 1940s. There, he supervised recordings from legendary Big Band Musicians like Glenn Miller, Duke Ellington and Coleman Hawkins.

== Later years ==
In the mid-1940s, he went into retirement as he was well off having a high paying job most his life. However, it was short lasting, as he decided to come out of retirement in 1946 to help found MGM Records with others who were seeking his help and experience. Through this company, he signed and became close friends with country singer Hank Williams, one of his greatest musical discoveries for which he is known. Hank once mentioned to him that their names sounded alike, so they would probably get along "just fine". As a result of his close relationship with him, Frank was crushed when he heard about his death in 1953. On that day, he wrote a letter as a tribute to him later known as "The Last Letter", which was later read over the radio by Mississippi disc jockey Jimmy Swan. He and Hank would usually exchange charismatic letters between each other so this was Frank's way of paying tribute. In 1956, he got to meet Richard Nixon, the vice president to President Dwight D. Eisenhower and the future 37th President of the United States.

== Personal life ==
On September 9, 1919, Walker married Laura Margaret Boyne (1894–1990) in New York City. She was originally from Philmont, New York. They had three children named John Robert Walker (1922–2021), Joan Marie Walker (1926–2020) and Jean Mary Walker (1928–2020). After her husband's death in 1963, Laura Walker moved to Maryland, where she was near her son John and his family. She died at a nursing home in Crofton, Maryland, in 1990 at the age of 95. She was buried in Glen Haven Cemetery in Glen Burnie, Maryland.

== Death ==
On October 15, 1963, nine days before turning 74, Walker died of a heart attack at his home, 4301 Westmoreland Avenue, in Little Neck, New York. On November 2, 1963, Billboard Magazine printed an article including his tribute to Hank Williams in his memory. He was buried in Saint Charles Cemetery in Farmingdale, New York.

== Legacy ==
Upon his death, Walker was survived by his three children and ten grandchildren. Jim Vienneau, the son of his sister-in-law, is also a music producer and his uncle Frank was his mentor. He is best known for producing the Conway Twitty song, "It's Only Make Believe".

In 2015, Walker was portrayed by actor Joe Knezevich in the HBO film Bessie, a biographical film about blues singer Bessie Smith. Later in 2015, he was portrayed by Rob Boltin in another biographic film about Hank Williams called I Saw the Light.

In 2017, Walker was featured in the award-winning documentary series American Epic. Directed by Bernard MacMahon, the films featured restored audio recordings of Frank Walker explaining how he found and recorded some of the first country, blues and Cajun musicians in the 1920s.

He was honored in 2020 with a posthumous Grammy Trustees Award for his work as a record executive with award being accepted by his son John, who was 98 at the time.
