= Dock Walsh =

American banjo player and bandleader

Dock Walsh in 1930

Doctor Coble Walsh (July 23, 1901 in Lewis Fork, Wilkes County, North Carolina – May 28, 1967), better known as Doc/Dock Walsh, was an American banjoist, and bandleader of The Carolina Tar Heels. He formed that group with Clarence Ashley in 1925, followed by the addition of Gwen Foster. Walsh is known as the "Banjo King of the Carolinas".

He played in a clawhammer style, but was one of the first to record the three-finger style. He also invented a method of playing with pennies under the bridge and the strings played with a knife, similar to bottle neck guitar style.

== Discography ==
- The Carolina Tar Heels (Folk Legacy, 1964)
- The Carolina Tar Heels (GHP, 1969)
- The Carolina Tar Heels (Bear Family, 1975)
- The Original Carolina Tar Heels: Look Who's Coming! (Old Homestead, 1978)
