= Henry Whitter =

American singer-songwriter

- Born: William Henry Whitter; April 6, 1892; Grayson County, Virginia, U.S.
- Died: November 17, 1941 (aged 49) Morganton, North Carolina, U.S.
- Genres: Old-time music
- Instruments: Guitar, harmonica, vocals
- Years active: 1923–1930
- Labels: Gennett, Victor

William Henry Whitter (April 6, 1892 – November 17, 1941) was an early old-time recording artist in the United States. He first performed as a solo singer, guitarist and harmonica player, and later in partnership with the fiddler G. B. Grayson. He recorded the first version of "Going Down the Road Feeling Bad".

== Biography ==
Whitter was born near Fries, Grayson County, Virginia, United States. He learned to play the guitar from an early age, and later on, the fiddle, banjo, harmonica and piano. His love of music made him dream of a career as an artist and he spent much time listening to cylinder recordings of Uncle Josh. He found work in a cotton mill called "Fries Washington Mill", but through the years from 1923 to 1926, he frequently took time off to record. He claimed that his first session was in March 1923 in New York City for Okeh Records, which would have made him the first truly country singer to record, a few months before Fiddlin' John Carson. However, this claim is not supported by the Okeh files. What is certain is that Whitter did record for Okeh from December 1923 to 1926.

In his first session, he recorded nine songs, including "Wreck On the Southern Old 97" coupled with "Lonesome Road Blues". The recording was released in January 1924, and was quite successful. The light opera singer and country musician Vernon Dalhart heard "Wreck On the Southern Old 97" and decided to record it. (That particular recording coupled with "The Prisoner's Song", went on to become the first million-selling record in country music in 1924.) Other songs in Whitter's repertoire would become standards, such as "The New River Train" and "Put My Little Shoes Away". He was the first to record the harmonica tunes "Lost John" and "Fox Chase". He also recorded cover versions of hits by other performer's such as Uncle Dave Macon's "Keep My Skillet Good And Greasy" and Kelly Harrell's "I Wish I Was Single Again". Although a limited musician, he supplied what record-buyers wanted and sold well. However, by 1926 there were more skilled musicians in the market, which may explain why Okeh ceased to record Whitter.

In 1927, he recorded for Victor Records at the Bristol Sessions, and a later field recording in Memphis, Tennessee. Also in 1927, Whitter met the blind fiddler G. B. Grayson (1887-1930) at a fiddlers' convention in Mountain City, Tennessee. Together they formed the successful duo Grayson & Whitter, recording for Gennett Records and Victor. Their output included songs that later became bluegrass standards such as "Banks of the Ohio", "Nine Pound Hammer", "Handsome Molly" and "Little Maggie". They were the first artists to record the song "Tom Dooley" in 1929, which later became a hit in the folk music boom of the 1950s and 1960s. Grayson died in an automobile accident outside Damascus, Virginia, in 1930. Whitter did not record again. However, he continued to play music frequently with the fiddler Albert Hash, who cited Whitter as an important influence. Whitter died of diabetes in Morganton, North Carolina, in 1941.

== See also ==
- Bristol Sessions

== Bibliography ==
- Stars of Country Music, Bill Malone and Judith Mcculloh (Editors), University of Illinois Press, 1975, ISBN 978-0252005275
