= Maymead Farm =

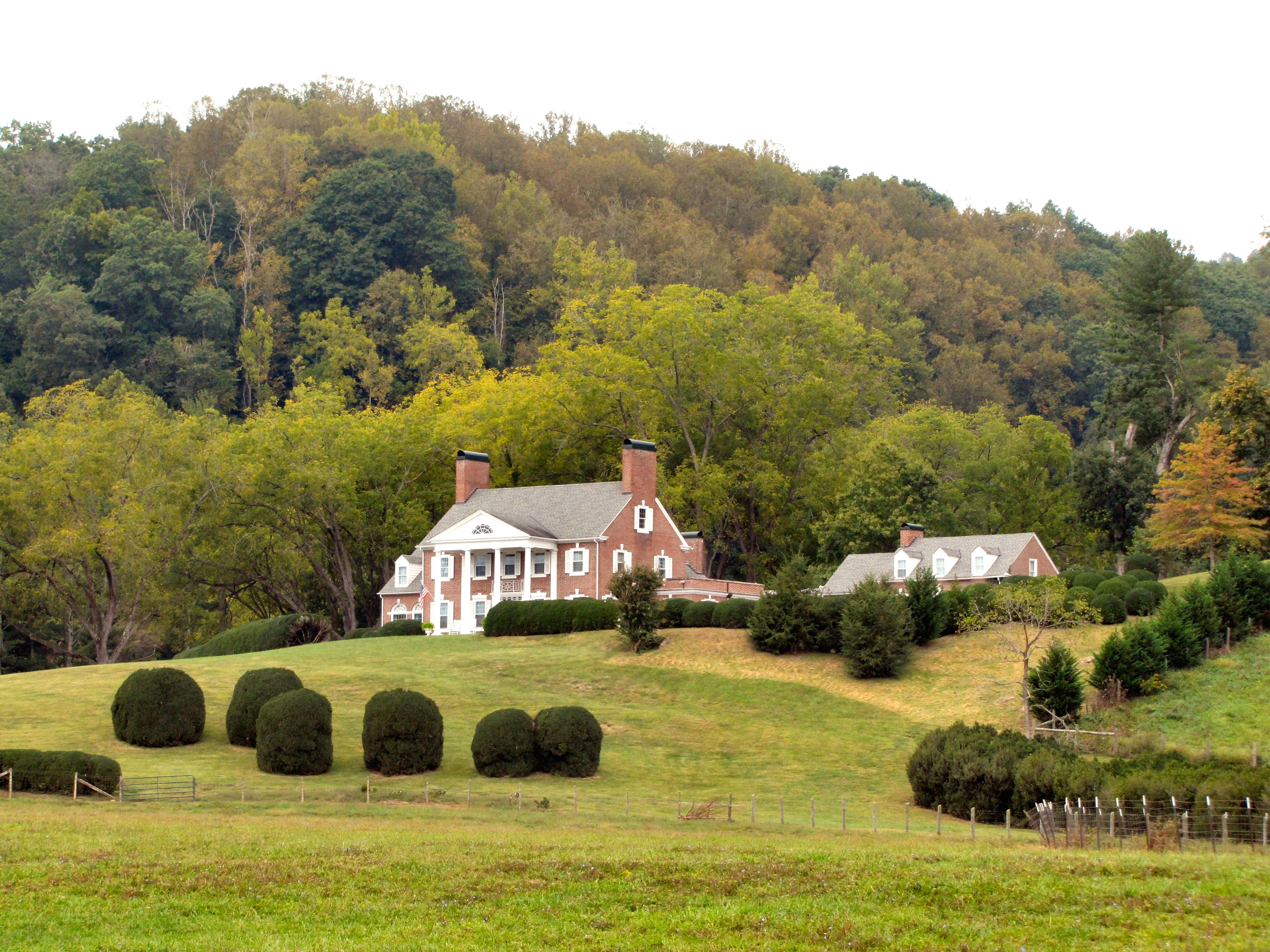
Mayood, a circa-1930 house on the Maymead Farm

Maymead Farm, also known as Maymead Stock Farm, is a historic farm in Johnson County, Tennessee, located two miles west of Mountain City.

Maymead Farm is one of Johnson County's oldest farms. The land was settled in the 18th century by the Wagner family, who received a land grant from King George II in 1747. Its name is derived from "May's Meadow", and was the name of a rail stop established on the farm when Norfolk and Western laid a railroad line through the area c. 1900.

At one time, livestock production was the main agricultural activity on the farm, but farming activity was later diversified to include crops such as corn and hay. As of 1989, Maymead produced corn, tobacco, and beef, and was one of the largest working farms in Tennessee.

During the Great Depression the farm diversified into quarrying, initially because of a contract from the Agricultural Stabilization and Conservation Service to supply crushed lime for use on farms in southwestern Virginia, upper East Tennessee, and northwestern North Carolina. The owners continued quarrying limestone after the government contract ended, and later expanded from the production of agricultural lime to add production of rock aggregates for used on building roads and highways. The Maymead corporation now operates several quarries in Tennessee and North Carolina and includes asphalt production operations.

As of 2012, descendants of the original owners were still the primary owners of the farm. Maymead is recognized as a bicentennial farm and is said to be one of only a few U.S. farms that have been owned by the same family since colonial times.

The farm was listed on the National Register of Historic Places in 2012 as "an important example of the agricultural history of the region". The National Register listing includes about 1,000 acres (400 ha) of land, 26 buildings, and a family cemetery that was established c. 1820. The two houses on the property (the Barton Roby Brown House, built in 1905, and Maywood, built in 1930) are examples of Colonial Revival architecture.
