= Johnson City sessions =

The Johnson City Sessions were a series of influential recording auditions conducted in Johnson City, Tennessee, in 1928 and 1929 by Frank Buckley Walker, head of the Columbia Records "hillbilly" recordings division. Certain releases from the Johnson City Sessions—especially Clarence Ashley's "The Coo-coo Bird" and The Bentley Boys' "Down On Penny's Farm"—are considered by music scholars as important recordings of early country music that influenced a whole generation of revivalist folk musicians of the 1950s and 1960s, including Bob Dylan, Joan Baez, and Doc Watson.

== Background ==
The auditions were part of a search for native Appalachian-Blue Ridge Mountains musical talent. Walker was a pioneer, as was Ralph Peer of Victor Records, in the art of remote recording, which was deemed more effective than bringing musicians to New York City or larger northern cities to record. They thought the unsophisticated amateurs would perform more comfortably in their accustomed surroundings.

=== First Auditions ===
On Saturday October 13, 1928, Walker auditioned musicians, with recording sessions scheduled for the following week at makeshift studios at the Brading-Marshall Lumber Company in Johnson City. Amateur musicians brought their fiddles, banjos, guitars and voices to Johnson City to display their talents for Walker. Participants included the Shell Creek Quartet, the Grant Brothers, the Roane County Ramblers, Renus Rich and Charles Bradshaw, Clarence Greene, the Wise Brothers, Ira Yates, Uncle Nick Decker, the Proximity String Quartet, Hardin and Grindstaff, the Greensboro Boys Quartet, Richard Harold, Charlie Bowman and His Brothers, the Bowman Sisters, Bill and Belle Reed, the Reed Children, the Reed Family, the Hodges Brothers, the Hodges Quartet, Bailey Briscoe, Robert Hoke and Vernal Vest, McVay and Johnson, Earl Shirkey and Roy Harper (Roy Harvey), George Roark, the Ed Helton Singers, the Garland Brothers and Grindstaff, Dewey Golden and His Kentucky Buzzards, the Holiness Singers, Frank Shelton and the McCartt Brothers/Patterson.

=== Second Auditions ===
Returning to Johnson City in October 1929, Walker auditioned the following in the second group: Blalock and Yates, Jack Jackson, George Wade and Grancom Braswell, the Roane County Ramblers, Wyatt and Brandon, Roy Harvey and Leonard Copeland, the Spindale Quartet, the Queen Trio, Earl Shirkey and Roy Harper (Roy Harvey), the Moatsville String Ticklers, the Weaver Brothers, Byrd Moore and His Hot Shots, the Bateman Sacred Quartet, Fred Richards, Clarence Ashley, the Bentley Boys, Charlie Bowman and His Brothers, Fran Trappe, Eph Woodie and the Henpecked Husbands, Ira and Eugene Yates, and Ellis Williams.

== Recordings ==
Popular recordings, such as "Roll on Buddy" (now a bluegrass standard) and "Moonshiner and His Money" by Charlie Bowman and His Brothers, along with "Johnson City Blues" by Clarence Greene, were made from the Johnson City Sessions. Clarence "Tom" Ashley's clawhammer banjo classic recording, "Coo Coo Bird", was a highlight of the 1929 Johnson City sessions. According to the North Carolina musician Walter Davis, he and Clarence Greene learned the art of blues guitar from the legendary performer Blind Lemon Jefferson, who played on the streets in Johnson City during the early 1920s.

== Influences ==
The Johnson City Sessions documented and distributed American roots music, including country, old-time, and bluegrass music. By recording regional musicians in East Tennessee, the sessions introduced their performances to audiences outside the region through commercial records. The recordings included a variety of musical styles, such as traditional ballads, fiddle tunes, and gospel music. They also provided a lasting record of regional musical traditions that had largely been passed through performance and down between generations. The sessions are recognized as part of the history of commercial country music recordings and the preservation of traditional Southern music. These effects are seen to day in the world of modern music. For example, The Bentley Boys performed in the Johnson City sessions, who further influenced Bob Dylan, a famous singer from 1957-present.

== Recent Notable Figures and Its impact on Johnson City ==
Many notable musicians have been associated with the Johnson City Sessions, sharing their music with audiences in the area. One of the most recent is Amythyst Kiah, a Grammy-nominated singer-songwriter originally from the Chattanooga area. When she isn’t touring, Kiah is based in Johnson City, bringing her East Tennessee roots to audiences across the country. Other artists who have paid tribute to the sessions include Clarence Greene, Dom Flemons, Willie Watson, and Doc Watson.

The sessions’ musical legacy continues to shape Johnson City. Murals honoring East Tennessee musicians and live performances held almost nightly help keep the city’s music scene vibrant. East Tennessee State University is also home to the nation’s flagship bluegrass and American roots music program, attracting young musicians eager to learn and develop their skills. The influence of the Johnson City Sessions can be seen throughout the city and beyond—in the work of artists who have honored the sessions and in the music community that continues to thrive in the greater Johnson City area.

=== Other States ===
In addition to the Johnson City sessions, Frank Buckley Walker (Oct. 24, 1889 - Oct. 15, 1963) scheduled recording sessions in Atlanta (1925 – 1932), New Orleans (1925-1927), Memphis (1928), and Dallas (1927-1929) to search out musical talent throughout the southern United States. Walker recounted to Mike Seeger once during an interview:

We would build up the recording sessions in advance – getting the word around that at a certain time of year we were going to be there, and these people would show up from 800 or 900 miles away. How they got there I'll never know and how they got back I'll never know. This was natural. Life in the country, particularly in the early days, was a lonesome life. Farmers would often talk to themselves or to a horse and stock… and the sound of that railroad train, that lonesome whistle has a powerful emotional impact.

== See also ==
- Bristol sessions
- Mountain City Fiddlers Convention
- Music of East Tennessee
- Old-time music
