= Clarence Horton Greene =

American songwriter

Clarence Horton Greene (June 26, 1894 – October 22, 1961) was an American musician and recording artist, noted for his fiddle and guitar work, and a pioneer in country music of the 1920s.

== Biography ==
Greene was born in Cranberry Gap, North Carolina, United States to James H. and Sarah (nee Pritchard) Greene; the 7th child of 8. He was a naturally gifted musician, in his teens he played fiddle in the Greene Brothers String Band, which also featured his brothers Ellis Baxter Greene on fiddle and Charles Nelson Greene on guitar. Greene played with numerous musical ensembles in the mountains of Western North Carolina and Northeastern Tennessee, and once beat Jimmie Rodgers in a guitar-picking contest. According to Greene's fellow musician and musical contemporary, Walter Davis, both Greene and Davis advanced their prowess on guitar by observing itinerant country blues artist Blind Lemon Jefferson, who played on the streets of Johnson City, Tennessee, during the early 1920s.

From 1927 through 1931, Greene recorded 28 songs released by 11 different record companies. He participated in the 1928 and 1929 Columbia Records' field studio sessions in Johnson City conducted by Columbia producer Frank Walker and the 1928 Victor sessions hosted by Ralph Peer in Bristol, Tennessee. From the 1928 Columbia sessions emerged a regional hit song, "Johnson City Blues," in which Greene adapted Ida Cox's tune "Chattanooga Blues" to fit Johnson City. In that era, prior to copyrighting of songs, there was a "public domain" attitude toward songwriting with the artist's style of the song being considered the original feature and not the lyrics. Greene was also present at the 1927 recording session in Atlanta when The Allen Brothers recorded "Chattanooga Blues". Greene's interpretation is closer in vocal style and tempo to the Ida Cox version with the exception that he replaces piano accompaniment with guitar.

In 1929, Greene recorded again for Frank Walker in Johnson City with a group called Byrd Moore's Hot Shots. This trio featured Byrd Moore (guitar, baritone vocal), Clarence "Tom" Ashley (guitar, lead vocal), and Clarence Greene (fiddle, tenor vocal). The mountain ballad, "Frankie Silvers", is the best known tune recorded by the Hot Shots in 1929. Tom Ashley's recording, "Coo Coo Bird", was also recorded at this session at which Greene did no solo recordings.

In 1931, Greene recorded in New York City for the American Record Company with a group called the Blue Ridge Mountain Entertainers. This group included Greene (fiddle, vocals), Tom Ashley (guitar, vocals), Gwin Foster (guitar, harmonica), Walter Davis (guitar), and Will Abernathy (autoharp, harmonica). These sessions produced fifteen songs eventually released on seven other record labels than American: Conqueror, Romeo, Oriole, Banner, Vocalion, Perfect, and Melotone.

While working in a variety of occupations from construction to mica mining, Greene continued to play music at square dances and local functions until the end of his life. He died on October 22, 1961, and is buried at Bear Creek Cemetery in Ledger, North Carolina.

Greene was a talented musician and contemporary of Jimmie Rodgers, Blind Lemon Jefferson, the Allen Brothers and a host of America's first recording stars. Unfortunately for Greene there was not only a casual attitude toward musical lyrics then, as his last name was misspelled by Columbia on his recordings (a mistake perpetuated today on old-time music anthologies). Columbia released "Johnson City Blues" as performed by Clarence Green rather than the correct spelling of Greene, with the final “e.” For this reason, musical historians have been stumped in the quest for the true identity of the recording artist. Mike Seeger, among other artists, have recorded "Johnson City Blues".

== See also ==
- Bristol sessions
- Johnson City sessions
- Old-time music
