= RedTail Mountain Resort =

Resort in Mountain City, Tennessee

Coordinates: 36.426°N 81.788°W

RedTail Mountain Resort is a luxury lodge and country club located in Mountain City, Tennessee. A gated community in the far northeastern corner of the state, it is the only golf club in Johnson County. The mountain resort is known for its high elevation (at or above 2,500 feet), and views of the surrounding hills and valleys. It has lodging available at daily rates or for long-term rentals that feature mountain views from every room, and amenities for guests and members such as an outdoor heated swimming pool, small gym, hiking, biking, and walking trails, and a game room.

RedTail Mountain also hosts a restaurant, Vistas Land and Sea Grille, which is well known by local residents for its creative and savory cuisine. Guests look out over the Iron Mountains, with choices of patio or indoor seating. The menu changes seasonally, and includes fresh vegetables, along with unique and interesting meals.
