= Albert Hash =

American old-time musician and fiddle maker

- Born: June 27, 1917; Rugby, Virginia
- Died: January 28, 1983 (aged 65); Rugby, Virginia
- Occupations: Musician and Fiddle Maker
- Notable work: "Nancy Blevins", "Hangman's Reel", "Old Sport", "Pretty Little Indian", and "Little Brown Hand"
- Style: Old-time

Albert Lillard Hash (June 27, 1917 - January 28, 1983) was an American Old-time musician and fiddle maker from Rugby, Virginia. He was the founder of the Whitetop Mountain Band and created the old-time program at Mount Rogers School. Hash was inducted into the Blue Ridge Music Hall of Fame in 2010 and since 2007, the Albert Hash Memorial Festival has been held to celebrate his legacy and impact on the old-time genre and community.

== Early life and background ==
Albert Hash was born on June 27, 1917 in Rugby, Virginia, to Abraham Hash and Della Long. Growing up on a small, self-sufficient farm, he had three brothers named Rudy, Dennis and Earnest. His entire family was musical with his family consisting of singers, dancers, banjo players, fiddle players, guitar players, and more. He initially learned fiddle from his great-uncle George Finley and his neighbor Corbett Stamper. He was also heavily inspired by traveling musicians like G. B. Grayson and Henry Whitter, frequently playing with Whitter after Grayson's death. Under these mentors' leadership, he began to learn a series of old-time musical standards by Gid Tanner and the Skillet Lickers from Georgia and Fiddlin' Arthur Smith from Tennessee.

As his early childhood was during the Great Depression, his family could not afford to buy him a fiddle despite his interest in the instrument. So, at the age of ten, Hash decided to make his own fiddle using a pocket knife with the materials he could find. As a teenager, Hash would walk four miles to attend Mount Rogers High School, which is the school where he would later found an old-time music program. As his interest in fiddle grew, Hash gained a desire to share his abilities with the world at the nearby White Top Folk Festival. In August 1933, Hash hiked Whitetop for the festival at the age of 16, carrying his prized handmade fiddle in a flour sack. He did this to hide his fiddle because fiddle music was shamed in this time period. At that festival, it is estimated that he played in front of 12,000 people, and he also joined a clogging competition.

In adulthood, he worked in a naval torpedo factory where he learned the machinist trade during World War II in northern Virginia. During this time he married his wife Ethel Ruth Spencer, whom he had known since they were school mates. The couple had two daughters Joyce Mae and Audrey Marie. Following Hash's service, the Folk Revival in the United States began to rise in prominence. In the 1960s and 1970s, musicians from the American Folk Revival began to contact Hash to learn about his traditional performance and instrument construction techniques. He continued to attend craft fairs, folk festivals, and fiddle competitions with his talents being featured at the 1982 World's Fair, the Smithsonian Institution, and the Grayson Highlands State Park.

== Instrument making ==
After making his first few fiddles, he ordered professional fiddle-making instructions to help him to improve his luthier skills. He sold his first professional fiddle for six dollars. Hash's work as a machinist enabled him to apply greater precision to his craft. Using his proficiency for woodworking, Hash began including intricate wood carvings on the backs and scrolls of his fiddles, which became one of the signature features of his work. Another defining characteristic of his work was unique inlays, which were frequently made from unconventional materials like different types of woods, pearl, pieces of combs, and even toothbrush handles. To create a sparkling effect, he would frequently place tinfoil underneath these inlays. He also taught others, taking on apprentices like Gerald Anderson, Randal Eller, his daughter Audrey Hash Ham, and world-renowned guitar maker Wayne Henderson. In the later years of his luthier career, he began to name his fiddles. Some examples of these names are The Voice of Peace, The Screaming Witch, The Spirit of Haw Orchard, and The Arthur Smith. In 1977, at the Smithsonian Folklife Festival, Hash demonstrated his fiddle-making abilities alongside Kyle Creed, Raymond Melton, and Wayne Henderson.

== Musical career and recordings ==
Hash played his first show at 12 years old, learning tunes like "Nancy Blevins" from his musical mentors. Then at 17 years old, after the death of his idol G. B. Grayson, he was recruited by Henry Whitter. Whitter chose Hash because of his ability to imitate Grayson's unique playing style. Hash went on to collaborate with other groups like the Virginia Carolina Boys with Wayne and Max Henderson. He also recorded old-time standards like "Hangman's Reel", setting a new standard for how the song was played. His most iconic group was the Whitetop Mountain Band. Its earliest iteration was the "Whitetop Mountain Boys." This group was formed in the 1940s and consisted of Albert Hash and Frank, Henry, and Dent Blevins. However, the more recognizable lineup formed in the 1970s and consisted of Albert Hash, Flurry Dowe, Tom and Becky Barr, his brother-in-law Thornton Spencer, and Thornton's wife Emily Spencer. This group became a staple at the Carter Family Fold venue and toured throughout the United States playing at colleges, competitions, and large events. Hash had a multitude of major performances including the 1982 World's Fair in Knoxville, the Smithsonian Institution, and the Grayson Highlands State Park.

== Community impact and education ==
Hash was well-known in his community as a gentle and shy man who was a talented woodworker and fiddle player. He was also known for being generous with his knowledge, being willing to share his skills with anyone. Hash began multiple teaching initiatives later in life. He, his daughter Audrey, and musicians Thornton and Emily Spencer began volunteering at local fire departments. It was here that they offered free old-time music lessons to the community in order to preserve and encourage participation in traditional Appalachian culture. Hash also helped establish an old-time music program at Mt. Rogers Combined School which his daughter continued after his passing in 1983. The program was later taken on by Emily Spencer. The Mt. Rogers School program evolved to become a daily class which gained national attention and was nominated for a Grammy award. This student band was renamed the "Albert Hash Memorial String Band" after his passing.

== Legacy and honors ==
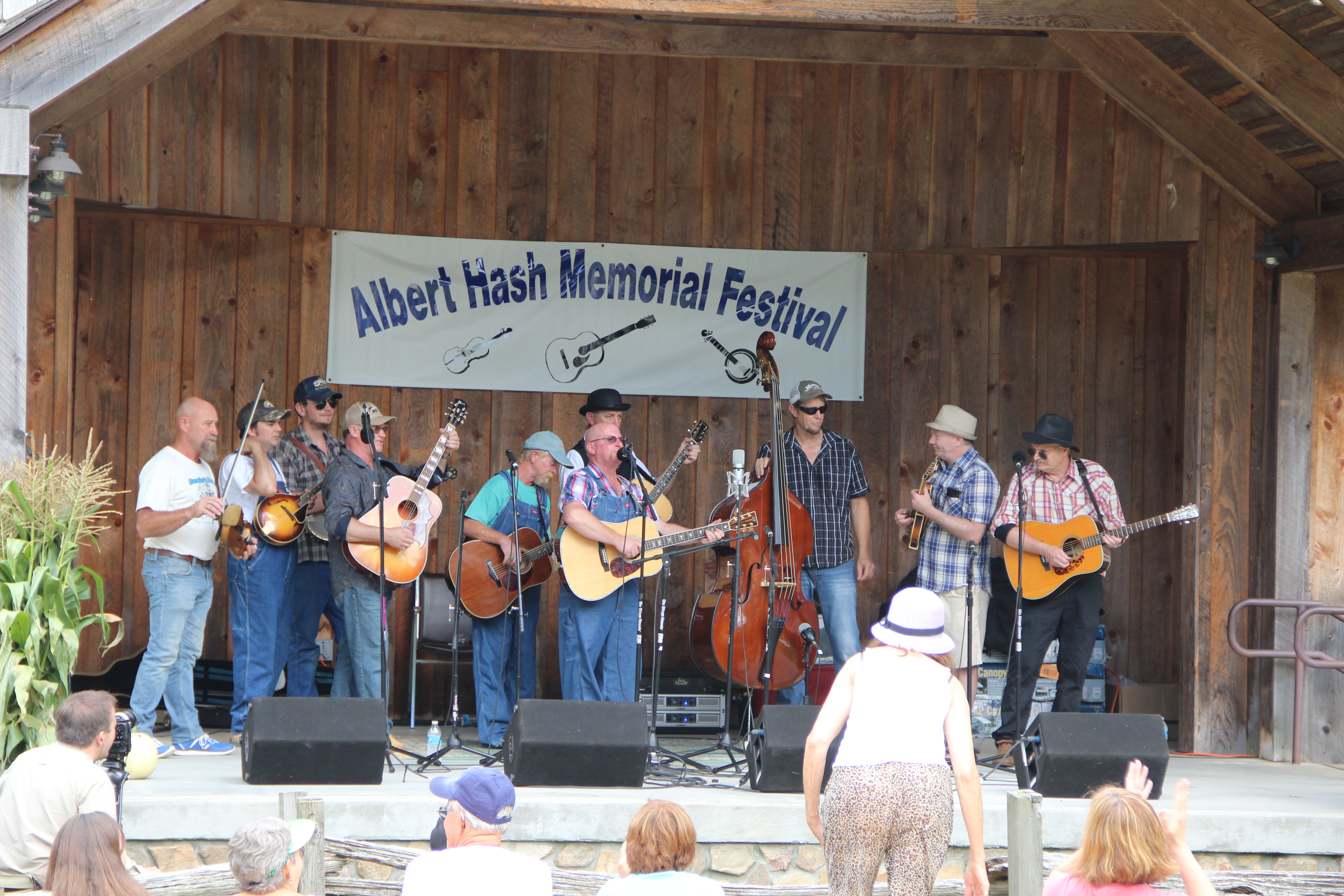
Picture of old-time group performing at Albert Hash Memorial Festival

In 1983, following his passing, the Virginia General Assembly held a moment of silence that lasted multiple minutes to honor his life. The assembly passed House Resolution 18, presenting his widow, Ethel, with a framed copy of the resolution that recognized him as a strong symbol of the best of Appalachian culture. In Hash's honor, an entire festival was established in 2007 called the Albert Hash Memorial Festival. This festival is annual and has the primary purpose of celebrating Hash's life and his impact on the old-time community. This festival has become a massive hub for Blue Ridge instrument makers, with many of them traveling to display their instruments.
