= The Carolina Tar Heels =

American old time string band, 1920s–1932

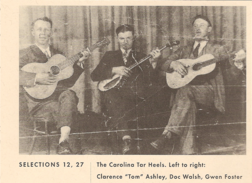
The Carolina Tar Heels in 1930: Clarence Ashley on the left, Dock Walsh in the middle, and Gwen Foster on the right

The Carolina Tar Heels was an American old time string band. It originally consisted of Dock Walsh (July 23, 1901 – May 28, 1967) on banjo and Gwen Foster on harmonica. Later Clarence Ashley (September 29, 1895 – June 2, 1967) joined on guitar after meeting Dock Walsh at fiddlers’ content in Boone, North Carolina in 1925. Garley Foster (January 10, 1905 – October 5, 1968) would replace Gwen on harmonica. Despite sharing a surname Gwen and Garley were not related.

The Carolina Tar Heels were most active in the 1920s. Ralph Peer named the band before recording them for the first time in 1927. After having already recorded twice in 1927 (Once in Atlanta and later in August in Charlotte for Peer and RCA-Victor), they started recording with Ashley in 1928 in Atlanta and in 1929 in New Jersey. In 1931, an unaffiliated group broadcasting out of Atlanta called the Carolina Tar Heels started up so the group sometimes took the moniker “The Original Carolina Tar Heels” or “The Pine Mountain Boys. The group stopped recording in 1932 after a February 25th session in Atlanta.

In 1952, the Carolina Tar Heels were included in the Anthology of American Folk Music that showcased the most era-defining and significant groups according to Harry Smith. The 1960's folk revival brought Doc Walsh and Garley Foster out of retirement to form a new band entitled The Carolina Tar Heels with Doc's son Drake Walsh.
