= G. B. Grayson =

American fiddle player and singer

G.B. Grayson
- Born: Gilliam Banmon Grayson; November 11, 1887; Ashe County, North Carolina, U.S.
- Origin: Johnson County, Tennessee, U.S.
- Died: August 16, 1930 (aged 42) near Damascus, Virginia, U.S.
- Genres: Old-time
- Instruments: Fiddle, vocals
- Years active: 1927–1930
- Labels: Gennett, Victor

Gilliam Banmon Grayson (November 11, 1887 – August 16, 1930) was an American old-time fiddle player and singer. Mostly blind from infancy, Grayson is chiefly remembered for a series of sides recorded with guitarist Henry Whitter between 1927 and 1930 that would later influence numerous country, bluegrass, and rock musicians. Grayson wrote much of his own material, but was also instrumental in adapting several traditional Appalachian ballads to fiddle and guitar formats. His music has been recorded or performed by musicians such as Bob Dylan, Doc Watson, Mick Jagger, the Kingston Trio, and dozens of bluegrass artists, including the Stanley Brothers and Mac Wiseman.

== Biography ==
G.B. Grayson was born in rural Ashe County, North Carolina in 1887 to Benjamin Carrol and Martha Jane Roark Grayson. According to his sister, when G.B. was six weeks old, his sight was damaged when he stared out the window at bright snow for several hours. While he was mostly blind his entire life, he could identify some people from their size and could tell time using a watch with large numbers. When G.B. was two years old, his family moved west to Johnson County, Tennessee, where he would live for the rest of his life.

While G.B.'s family was poor, the Graysons were a fairly prominent family in the mountains along the northern Tennessee-North Carolina border. G.B.'s uncle, James Grayson (1833–1901), was a Union Army officer who helped organize an anti-Confederate uprising in Carter County, Tennessee at the outbreak of the American Civil War and later aided in the capture of legendary North Carolina fugitive Tom Dula. G.B. and Henry Whitter were the first to record the folk song Tom Dooley— based on the capture of Dula— in 1929.

G.B. learned to play music at a young age, and was an accomplished fiddler by his early teens. As he was unable to work due to his near-blindness, he began playing at various small venues and dances around Johnson County to make money. Banjoist Clarence Ashley— who also lived in Johnson County— recalled travelling with Grayson to the West Virginia coal mines as early as 1918 to collect money by playing outside coal company pay shacks.

In 1927, Grayson met Whitter— who had already had some success as a recording artist— at a fiddler's convention in Mountain City, Tennessee. The two recorded eight sides for Gennett Records in October of that year, but their greatest success came with a subsequent Victor session which produced the double-sided "Train 45"/"Handsome Molly", which sold over 50,000 copies in five years. A follow-up session in 1929 brought less success, but Grayson had saved up enough money to buy a new house. On August 16, 1930, Grayson was killed while riding on the running boards of a car outside Damascus, Virginia.

He married Rhoda Frances "Fannie" Mahaffey (26 July 1887 - 8 August 1948). They had seven children, six of whom survived into adulthood. She and G.B. are buried in the Gentry Cemetery, near Laurel Bloomery, Tennessee.

== Repertoire and style ==
Grayson played the fiddle in an "archaic" style, holding it against his shoulder rather than his chin. Most of the songs he wrote were based loosely on other well-known songs of the day. "Train 45" was derived from the banjo tune "Reuben," and "Joking Henry" was probably influenced by the folk song "Frankie and Johnnie." He wrote "Going Down the Lee Highway" as he and Whitter drove along U.S. Route 11 in Johnson County in 1929. He learned "Nine Pound Hammer" from fellow fiddler Charlie Bowman (who had picked it up from an African-American musician), and his version of "Short Life of Trouble" resembles Clarence Ashley's recording during the same period. Grayson and Whitter's traditional recordings include "Rose Connally" and "Ommie Wise."

Although their partnership was short-lived, the recordings of Grayson and Whitter are among the most emulated and covered of early Old-time and country music. While still active the duo influenced younger musicians such as the fiddler Albert Hash. Later, their recordings would shape the folk revival. The Kingston Trio had a Number 1 hit with a version of "Tom Dooley" in 1958. In the early 1960s, musicologist Ralph Rinzler played Grayson's recording of "Ommie Wise" at Clarence Ashley's house in Shouns to help convince Ashley, Doc Watson, and several of their bandmates to take up the more traditional style of music rather than the more modern electric music. "Train 45" and "Nine Pound Hammer" have become staples at Bluegrass festivals. "Handsome Molly" has been recorded by both Bob Dylan and Rolling Stones singer Mick Jagger. Ralph Stanley has recorded Grayson's song "Little Maggie, with a dram glass in her hand" multiple times.
