= Gwin Foster =

American musician

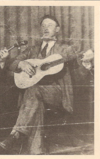
Gwen Foster in 1927

Gwin Stanley Foster (December 25, 1903 – November 25, 1954), also known as Gwen or Gwyn, was an old-time/country harmonica and guitar player who was known for work in The Carolina Tar Heels and the Blue Ridge Mountain Entertainers.

He was born in Caldwell County, North Carolina, and died in Dallas, North Carolina, the son of Joe Foster and Myra Elizabeth (nee Day). He worked in the textile mills, where he met banjoist Coble "Dock" Walsh, and they formed the band.

The oldest known recording of the song, "House of the Rising Sun", under the title "Rising Sun Blues", is by Appalachian artists Clarence Ashley and Foster, who recorded it on September 6, 1933, on the Vocalion label (02576).

== Further references ==
- Tony Russell: Country Music Originals (2007), S. 111 f.; Oxford University Press, ISBN 0-19-532509-5, ISBN 978-0-19-532509-6
