= Laurel Bloomery, Tennessee =

Laurel Bloomery
- Unincorporated community
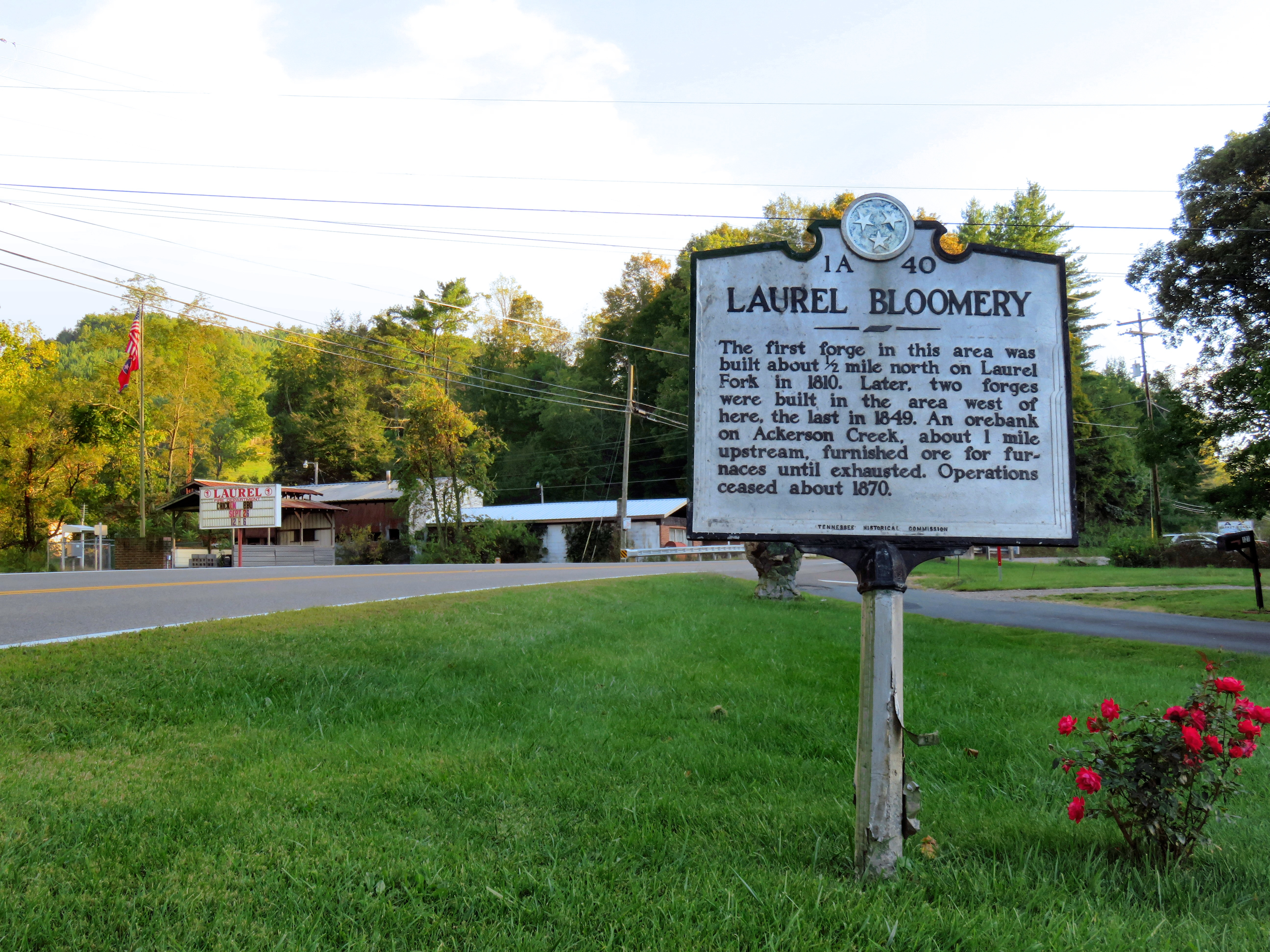
- Tennessee Historical Commission marker in Laurel Bloomery

- Location within Tennessee Location within the United States
- Coordinates: 36°33′58″N 81°45′34″W
- Country: United States
- State: Tennessee
- County: Johnson County
- Elevation: 2,411 ft (735 m)
- Time zone: UTC-5 (Eastern (EST))
  - Summer (DST): UTC-4 (EDT)
- ZIP code: 37680
- Area code: 423
- FIPS code: 47-41100
- GNIS feature ID: 1328639

Laurel Bloomery is an unincorporated community in Johnson County, Tennessee. Settled in the early 19th century, the community's first bloomery forge mill was built and began operation in 1810. The mill was closed in 1870, but portions are still standing today. The area is known for its beautiful mountains and secluded valleys.

Laurel Bloomery is the northeasternmost community in the state of Tennessee.

== Old Time Fiddler's Convention ==
The Old Time Fiddler's Convention is held the Saturday before Labor Day weekend at the Old Mill Music Park. Local musicians travel far and wide to attend this festival, marked with old time folk and bluegrass music. It marks the annual anniversary of the Mountain City Fiddlers Convention of 1925, held in nearby Mountain City.

Pioneering fiddler G. B. Grayson is buried in Gentry Cemetery, in Laurel Bloomery. He mentions Laurel Bloomery in the 1928 Victor recording of the song Train 45: "I'm a goin' to Laurel Bloomery, Tennessee, Henry..."

== Education ==
Laurel Elementary School is the primary school in the Laurel Bloomery community. The school houses grades K-6 with an approximate enrollment of 70 students. The school started in the early 20th century in a small, one-room building and housed grades K-12. It continued to house grades K-8 until the 1970s, when middle and high schools were built in the Mountain City section of Johnson county.
