= Clarence Ashley =

American folk musician (1895–1967)

- Ashley as a member of the Carolina Tar Heels, c. 1930

Background information
- Also known as: Tom Ashley; Thomas C. Ashley
- Born: Clarence Earl McCurry; September 29, 1895; Bristol, Tennessee, U.S.
- Died: June 2, 1967 (aged 71) Winston-Salem, North Carolina, U.S.
- Genres: Folk music
- Occupation: Musician
- Instruments: Banjo; guitar
- Years active: c. 1928–1943; 1960–1967
- Labels: Gennett; Columbia; ARC; Folkways
- Formerly of: Carolina Tar Heels; Haywood County Ramblers; Blue Ridge Mountain Entertainers

Clarence "Tom" Ashley (born Clarence Earl McCurry; September 29, 1895 – June 2, 1967) was an American musician and singer, who played the clawhammer banjo and the guitar. He began performing at medicine shows in the Southern Appalachian region as early as 1911, and gained initial fame during the late 1920s as both a solo recording artist and as a member of various string bands. After his "rediscovery" during the folk revival of the 1960s, Ashley spent the last years of his life playing at folk music concerts, including appearances at Carnegie Hall in New York and at the Newport Folk Festival in Rhode Island.

== Biography ==
=== Early life ===
Ashley was born Clarence Earl McCurry in Bristol, Tennessee in 1895, the only child of George McCurry and Rose-Belle Ashley. Those who knew George McCurry described him variously as a "one-eyed fiddler, hell-raiser, and big talker." Shortly before Clarence was born, Rose-Belle's father, Enoch Ashley, discovered that his son-in-law George was an adulterer. George was forced to leave town. Rose-Belle moved back in with her father, and around 1900, the family relocated to Shouns, Tennessee, a crossroads just south of Mountain City, where Enoch ran a boarding house. When Clarence was very young, he was nicknamed "Tommy Tiddy Waddy" (after a nursery rhyme) by his grandfather Enoch, and thus became known to friends and acquaintances as 'Tom'. As he was raised by the parents of his mother, the name "McCurry" was dropped in favor of "Ashley". From infancy, Tom was acquainted with musicians. His grandfather bought him a banjo when he was eight years old, and his mother and aunts taught him to play traditional Appalachian folk songs and ballads. He learned a number of songs and techniques from itinerant lumberjacks and railroad workers lodging at his grandfather's boarding house. In 1911, Tom joined a medicine show that happened to be passing through Mountain City. He played banjo and guitar, and performed blackface comedy. Tom would play with medicine shows every summer until the early 1940s. During winters, he organized local concerts at rural schools. He would also play for money at coal camps and rayon mills, often accompanied by influential Johnson County fiddler G. B. Grayson.

=== Recording career and the Great Depression ===
Tom made his first recordings for Gennett Records during February 1928 with the Blue Ridge Mountain Entertainers, which then consisted of Ashley on banjo or guitar, Garley Foster on harmonica, and Clarence Horton Greene on fiddle. Later that year, with the help of Victor producer Ralph Peer, Ashley made several recordings with The Carolina Tar Heels, which consisted of Tom on guitar and vocals, his friend Dock Walsh on banjo, and Gwen or Garley Foster on harmonica. In 1929, Frank Walker of Columbia Records auditioned Ashley to make his first solo recordings, as well as to record with a trio called "Byrd Moore and His Hot Shots" at the Johnson City Sessions. During the early 1930s, Ashley again recorded with the Blue Ridge Entertainers, this time for the American Record Corporation. The final recordings from his early era were a series of duets with harmonica player Gwen Foster in 1933.

The effects of the Great Depression made money scarce throughout the early 1930s. Not only was Ashley no longer recruited to make records, it was virtually impossible to earn money playing at coal camps or on street corners. The Depression (along with government regulations) also greatly reduced the crowds that attended medicine shows. Ashley worked briefly as a coal miner in West Virginia, and did odd jobs back in Shouns to support his wife, Hettie, and their two children. In 1937, he established a trucking business in Mountain City that hauled furniture and crops to various cities around the region. Throughout the following decade, Ashley performed as a comedian with the Stanley Brothers. He formed a local string band, the Tennessee Merrymakers.

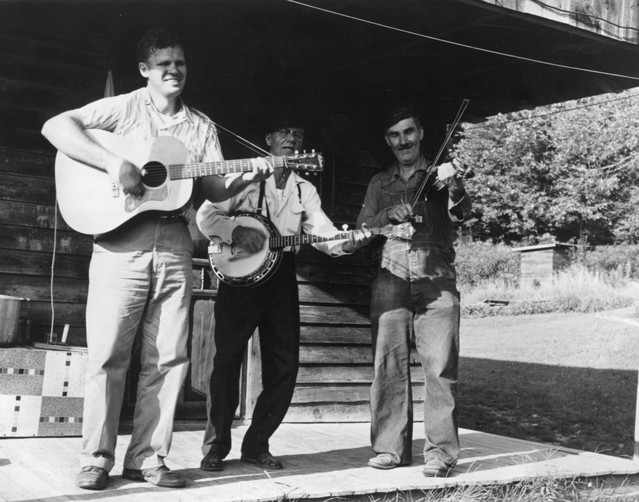
Ashley along with country musician Doc Watson in 1960.

=== Rediscovery ===
During the folk music revival of the late 1950s and early 1960s, urban ethnomusicologists rediscovered Ashley's music. By this time, Ashley was well known among folk music enthusiasts due in large part to Harry Smith's Anthology of American Folk Music (1952), which included some of Ashley's early recordings. In 1960, Ralph Rinzler met Ashley at the Old Time Fiddler's Convention in Union Grove, North Carolina. He eventually persuaded him to start playing banjo again and to record his repertoire of songs. Over the next few years Ashley and his friends Doc Watson, Clint Howard, and Fred Price played at numerous urban folk festivals, including the Chicago Folk Festival in 1962 and the Newport Folk Festival in 1963.

Ashley continued touring the folk circuit throughout the mid-1960s. He appeared at Carnegie Hall in New York and played at dozens of venues in California. In 1966, Ashley and Reidsville, North Carolina guitarist Tex Isley toured England. A second tour of England was planned for 1967, but Ashley grew ill and discovered he had cancer before he departed. He died in 1967 at Baptist Hospital in Winston-Salem, North Carolina.

In March 2013, the Library of Congress announced that the album, Old Time Music at Clarence Ashley's, would be added to the National Recording Registry. The album consists of a series of early-1960s recordings by Ralph Rinzler of folk songs performed by Ashley and bandmates Doc Watson, Clint Howard, Fred Price, Gaither Carlton and Tommy Moore.

== Repertoire and influence ==
Ashley learned much of his repertoire from his grandfather and aunts and itinerant musicians lodging at his grandfather's boarding house in the early 1900s. His unusual G-modal banjo tuning style, which he called "sawmill" (gDGCD from fifth string to the first), was likely taught to him by family members. He recorded several songs derived from English or Irish ballads that were passed down through generations in Appalachia, the best-known of which included "Coo Coo Bird" (which he learned from his mother), "House Carpenter", and "Rude and Rambling Man". Other recordings included the murder ballads "Naomi Wise", "Little Sadie", and "John Hardy", and the folk songs "Frankie Silvers" and "Greenback Dollar". An African-American influence can be heard on Ashley's renderings of "Dark Holler", "Haunted Road Blues", and "Corrina, Corrina".

The oldest known recording of the song, "House of the Rising Sun", under the title "Rising Sun Blues", is by Appalachian artists Ashley and Foster, who recorded it on September 6, 1933, on the Vocalion label (02576), which he claimed he learned from his maternal grandfather.

During the folk revival years of the 1960s, Ashley and his band helped to popularize the 18th century English, Southern hymn, "Amazing Grace."

Several notable musicians cite Ashley as an important influence. Roy Acuff once worked medicine shows with Ashley, and Ashley probably taught him "House of the Rising Sun" (which Acuff recorded during 1938) and "Greenback Dollar." Guitarist and singer Doc Watson began his recording career with Ashley in 1960 and played in Ashley's band for several years. Grateful Dead frontman Jerry Garcia once said in an interview that he learned clawhammer picking from "listening to Clarence Ashley". Other folk musicians influenced by Ashley include Joan Baez, Judy Collins, and Jean Ritchie.

== Discography ==
- Play And Sing American Folk Music (with Tex Isley) (Folkways 2350)
- Live And In Person: Greenwich Village 1963 (Jalopy Records 170131, JALOPY004, 16-0247, 27223, 27523)
