= Cradle of Country Music Park =

Public park in Knoxville, Tennessee, US

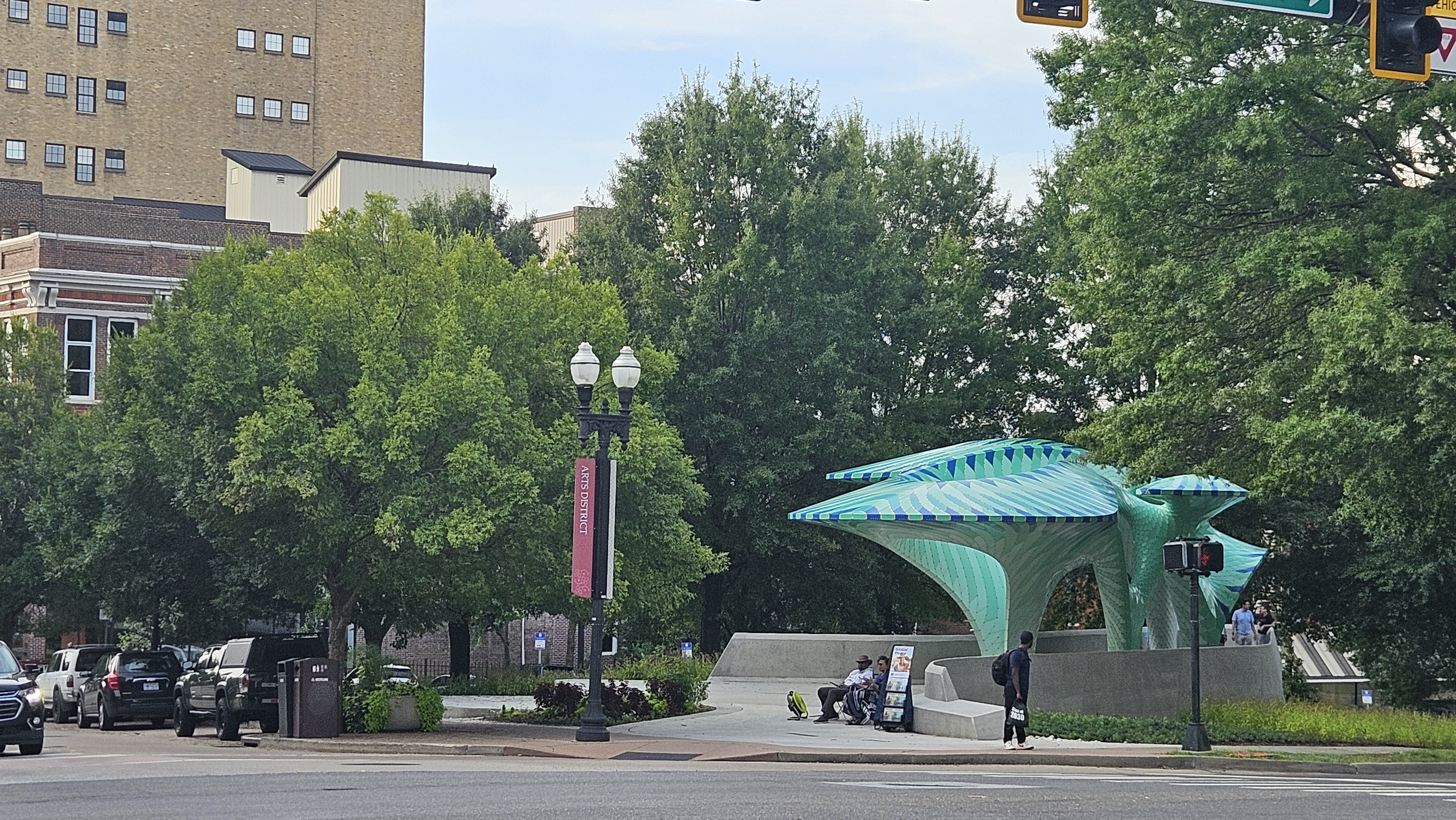
- Interactive map of Cradle of Country Music Park
- Location: Knoxville, Tennessee, United States
- Coordinates: 35°58′04″N 83°55′10″W
- Area: 0.5 acre
- Operator: City of Knoxville
- Open: Open

Cradle of Country Music Park is a public park in downtown Knoxville, Tennessee, United States. It was created in 1986 to recognize the musical heritage of Knoxville and East Tennessee, especially the city’s historical ties to early country music.

== History ==
The original park opened in 1986 and housed an 18-foot fiberglass and metal statue shaped like a treble clef as a tribute to East Tennessee country music. In 2009, the statue was removed and the park showed temporary art as part of Dogwood Arts' Arts in Public Places program.

In 2014, citizens were asked for their ideas for the park in a session facilitated by the East Tennessee Community Design Center. Six groups, each led by an artist and landscape architect, sketched ideas. Originally, the selected artist would have been asked to incorporate metal plaques that were part of Cradle of Country Music Park and were stored at the East Tennessee History Center.

In 2017, it was announced that the City of Knoxville's Public Arts Committee had begun a process to place a permanent artistic element in a newly designed park. By 2022, 100 artists had submitted proposals to fill the park. That year, it was revealed that the plan called for five trees to be cut down and replaced with some artwork, while the park was expected to host for "small concerts and public events."

In 2024, the site was eventually redesigned and opened as a green space centered on the large sculptural installation Pier 865, designed by American artist Marc Fornes.

The park is included on the East Tennessee Historical Society's Cradle of Country Music Walking Tour as location number nine with a marker for Archie Campbell and Chet Atkins.
