= Al Hopkins =

American musician (1889–1932)

Albert Green Hopkins (1889 – October 21, 1932) was an American musician, a pioneer of what later came to be called country music; in 1925 he originated the earlier designation of this music as "hillbilly music", though not without qualms about its pejorative connotation.

Hopkins played piano, an unusual instrument for Appalachian music. The members of the band that brought him to fame (which was known by several names: The Hill Billies, Al Hopkins' Original Hill Billies, and Al Hopkins and His Buckle Busters) came variously from Hopkins' own Watauga County, North Carolina, and from Grayson and Carroll Counties in Virginia. Although the group formed up in 1924 in Galax, Virginia, they were based in Washington, D.C., and performed regularly on WRC. In 1927 they became the first country musicians to perform in New York City. They were also the first to play for a president of the United States (Calvin Coolidge, at a Press Correspondents' gathering) and the first to appear in a movie (a 15-minute Warner Bros./Vitaphone short released along with Al Jolson's The Singing Fool).

== Family and musical influences ==
Hopkins was born in Watauga County, North Carolina, an area known for the richness of its folk culture. His father, John Benjamin Hopkins, a sometime North Carolina state legislator, built organs as a hobby, played the fiddle, piano, and organ, and had a good repertoire of traditional fiddle tunes. His mother, Celia Isabel Green Hopkins, sang old ballads and church music, among other tunes. Hopkins and his siblings all showed musical talent early. In 1904 the family moved to Washington, D.C., and Hopkins' father went to work for the United States Census Bureau. His sister Lucy later remarked that Al and his brothers and sisters also had plenty of exposure to the popular music of the time.

== Early career ==
In 1910 Al Hopkins launched his professional music career. He and his younger brothers Joe, Elmer, and John formed a group called the Old Mohawk Quartet, which played regularly at Washington's Majestic Theater.

About 1912 the family built a large new house at 63 Kennedy Street in an area of Northwest Washington, D.C., that was not yet built out. Hopkins' mother and the younger children summered at the family farm in Gap Creek, North Carolina, so their contact with rural life remained strong. In the early 1920s Hopkins' oldest brother, Jacob, a surgeon and musician, established a rural hospital/clinic in Galax, Virginia, where he often invited local banjo players to entertain the hospital patients. Doctor Hopkins was renowned and active as a surgeon and musician. Al Hopkins worked for him in Galax as hospital office manager and secretary. Joe, who would later play with Al in his recorded bands, worked at this time as a Railway Express agent in White Top Gap, Virginia. Joe played guitar here and there in his spare time, including at his brother's clinic.

In late spring 1924, Joe met fiddler and journeyman barber Alonzo Elvis "Tony" Alderman in the latter's Galax barber shop. The two of them and Al Hopkins were soon a trio. John Rector, a local general store keeper and five-string banjo player who has already, recorded decided that they were better than his current band, and joined them. They soon traveled to New York City to record, a three-day trip in a Ford Model T. That initial recording session was a disaster: the technology for recording such groups was still in its infancy. That wasn't their only bad fortune that year: Doctor Hopkins died July 26, 1924.

Early the next year they made it back to New York (this time in a new Dodge Rector had bought) and, on January 15, 1925, recorded six pieces much more successfully for Ralph Peer at OKeh.

== Hill Billies and Buckle Busters ==
Lacking a band name, at the OKeh session Hopkins (whose now-urban father had been kidding him about the direction his life was taking) told Peer "We're nothing but a bunch of hillbillies from North Carolina and Virginia. Call us anything." In fact, no one in the band conformed to the stereotype of a backwoods hillbilly. The Hopkins brothers father was a legislator and civil servant; Rector owned a store; Alderman had grown up in an isolated cabin, but his father was a surveyor, civil engineer, and justice of the peace. Still, they became The Hill Billies, and although they soon had qualms about the name (Alderman would later say, "Hillbilly was not only a funny word; it was a fighting word."), fellow musician Ernest Stoneman encouraged them to keep it: "Well, boys, you have come up with a good one. Nobody could beat it."

With Hopkins' doctor brother dead, there was no reason to stay in Galax, and the band based itself in Washington, D.C., where they soon became regulars on WRC; on the radio, Hopkins mother sang with them on the ballads.

On May 8, 1925, they played at an enormous fiddler's convention in Mountain City, Tennessee, sponsored by the local Ku Klux Klan. At this time Charlie Bowman joined the band as an additional fiddler. Other members would later come and go, but this completed the classic lineup.

They played gigs from South Carolina to New York. commenced – at schools, vaudeville shows, fiddlers' competitions, political rallies, and even a White House Press Correspondents' gathering before President Coolidge.

For OKeh, they recorded only on the 1925 session produced by Ralph Peer. Later, they would record for Vocalion (as The Hill Billies), and Brunswick (as Al Hopkins and His Buckle Busters). The Vocalion and Brunswick recordings were identical except for the band names.

Among the songs recorded during these sessions was "Nine Pound Hammer," a bluegrass standard later popularized by Merle Travis; the commonly heard bluegrass version of the song has been traced to the band's recording of it on May 13, 1927 in New York for Brunswick (catalog no. 177).

Hopkins and his band tried at one point to control the name "Hill Billy" as it applied to music. They incorporated their group January 21, 1929, as Al Hopkins' Original Hill Billies, but ultimately accepted that their band name had become the name of a genre of music.

Hopkins and his band continued to perform until his death in a car accident in Winchester, Virginia, in 1932. The band broke up after his death.

== Band lineup ==
- Al Hopkins, piano
- Joe Hopkins (birth and death dates unknown), guitar
- Alonzo Elvis "Tony" Alderman (September 10, 1900 – October 25, 1983), fiddle
- John Rector, 5-string banjo John Rector was an old man at the time of the recordings he did not die in 1985, that would have been another John Rector of Galax, Virginia who was a fiddler.
- Charlie Bowman (July 30, 1889 – May 20, 1962), fiddle, joined in 1925
