= Ralph Rinzler =

American festival organizer (1934–1994)

Ralph Rinzler (July 20, 1934 – July 2, 1994) was an American mandolin player, folksinger, and the co-founder of the annual Smithsonian Folklife Festival on the Mall every summer in Washington, D.C., where he worked as a curator for American art, music, and folk culture at the Smithsonian. This festival was from the beginning and continues to be a major event for musicians, artisans, and craftsman from a broad variety of American culture, including African American, Native American, Appalachian, Southern, Western and other groups in the United States.

He was inducted into the International Bluegrass Music Hall of Fame in 2012.

== Biography ==
Ralph Rinzler grew up in Passaic, New Jersey, United States. His father was a doctor of Russian-Jewish descent. While in High School, Rinzler became a friend and mentor to younger Passaic resident David Grisman. Rinzler went to Swarthmore College where he began performing as a mandolin player in various folk music groups in the mid to late 1950s. After graduation, he went to New York City where he eventually became one of the famous Greenbriar Boys, a popular folk group that was the main event at Greenwich Village's Gerde's Folk City, with Bob Dylan as his warm-up opening act. Rinzler and the Greenbriar Boys recorded several successful records and played many concerts and clubs up and down the East Coast. He also played on a lot of other people's albums, including Joan Baez, Clarence Ashley, and won a Grammy for his work as a producer.

At the same time Rinzler was also a diligent folklorist, who helped bring new artists into Folk Revival scene, such as Bill Monroe, Doc Watson, Hazel Dickens, and others. At the 1960 Union Grove Fiddlers' Convention, the string band he recorded included Clint Howard and Fred Price, and with them the then unknown Watson.

He got a job at the Smithsonian where he worked as a curator, producer, promoter, champion, writer, and advocate of American folk music from multiple cultures.

Rinzler's prominent role in the Festival and at the Center for Folklife Programs prompted the Smithsonian Institution to name the Ralph Rinzler Folklife Archives and Collections in his honor in 1998.
