= Charlie Bowman =

American musician (1889–1962)

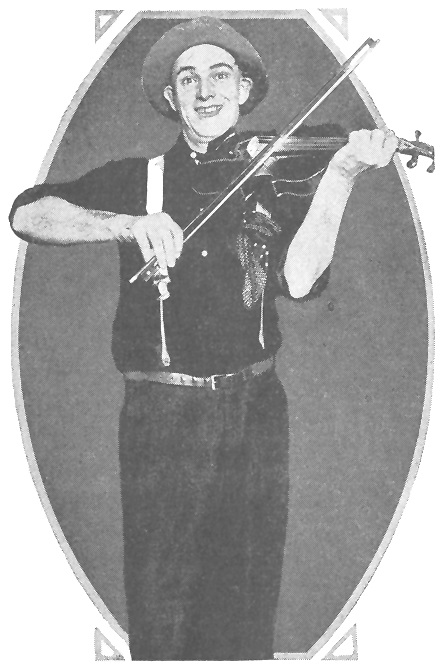
- Bowman circa 1926

Background information
- Also known as: "Fiddlin' Charlie Bowman", "Fox Hunt Charlie"
- Born: Charles Thomas Bowman; July 30, 1889; Gray Station, Tennessee, USA.
- Died: May 20, 1962 (aged 72)
- Genres: Old-time music
- Instrument: Fiddle
- Years active: c. 1920–1957
- Labels: Vocalion, Brunswick, Columbia
- Formerly of: Charlie Bowman and His Brothers, the Hill Billies, Blue Ridge Ramblers, Blue Ridge Music Makers

Charles Thomas Bowman (July 30, 1889 – May 20, 1962) was an American old-time fiddle player and string band leader. He was a major influence on the distinctive fiddle sound that helped shape and develop early Country music in the 1920s and 1930s. After delivering a series of performances that won him the first prize in dozens of fiddle contests across Southern Appalachia in the early 1920s, Bowman toured and recorded with several string bands and vaudeville acts before forming his own band, the Blue Ridge Music Makers, in 1935. In his career, he would be associated with country and bluegrass pioneers such as Uncle Dave Macon, Fiddlin' John Carson, Roy Acuff, Charlie Poole, and Bill Monroe.

== Early life ==
Bowman was born July 30, 1889, in Gray Station, Tennessee, a small community approximately 10 miles (16 km) north of Johnson City. He first learned to play banjo at the age of 12, and purchased his first fiddle for $4.50 shortly thereafter. According to family tradition, Bowman actually made his first recording on a neighbor's Edison cylinder phonograph in 1908. In his teen years, he and his brothers (who had each learned a different instrument) collected pocket change by playing at square dances and other local events around Washington County. Congressman B. Carroll Reece was one of several politicians to hire the Bowmans to play at political rallies in the early 1920s, and Reece remained a lifelong friend of the Bowman family.

In the early 1920s, a local businessman sponsored Bowman in the United Commercial Travelers' fiddle contest in nearby Johnson City. After placing second and collecting a $25 prize, Bowman, realizing he could make money by playing in fiddle contests, spent several months traveling back and forth to contests around the region. He captured first prize in 28 out of the 32 contests he entered. At one point, when several people had become skeptical of Bowman's success, the judges were placed so they could not see who was playing, yet Bowman still placed first.

== String bands and vaudeville ==
At a Mountain City fiddlers' convention in May 1925, Bowman met Al Hopkins, who invited Bowman to join his band, the "Hill Billies." With Bowman on fiddle, the Hill Billies traveled to New York, where they recorded several sides for Vocalion and Brunswick and even played on Broadway. The band then relocated to Washington, D.C. where they played regularly on D.C.-area radio station WLS, and in 1928, performed at a White House social hosted by President Calvin Coolidge. Later that year, the band played in the Al Jolson motion picture, The Singing Fool. In Fall 1928, Bowman left the band and returned to Gray Station.

In October 1928, Bowman and several family members made several recordings at the Johnson City sessions, a recording audition held by Columbia Records in Johnson City. The following year, Columbia invited Bowman to New York, where he and his brother, Walter (on banjo), recorded "Forked Deer" and "Moonshiner and His Money." Around 1930, Bowman and several family members joined the vaudeville group, the "Blue Ridge Ramblers", with whom they toured the Loew's vaudeville circuit until 1935.

== Later career ==
After leaving the Blue Ridge Ramblers, Bowman formed his own string band, the Blue Ridge Music Makers, and played on various radio stations throughout the Southeastern United States. In the 1940s, Bowman traveled west, sometimes as far as California, playing at different venues and with various makeshift bands and line-ups. He played in 20 different states before he finally gave up performing in 1957.

In the early 1960s, at the height of the folk revival movement in the United States, Bowman was interviewed by several magazines and music collectors, including Dorsey Dixon and Pete Seeger. His recollections of the Johnson City sessions, his years with the Hill Billies, and numerous other memories provided an invaluable first-hand account of the development of old-time music and country music in the 1920s and 1930s. Bowman died on May 20, 1962.

Bowman wrote and adapted dozens of songs and fiddle tunes throughout his career. His most well-known include railroad songs such as "Nine Pound Hammer," "Roll On, Buddy," and "Fogless Bill." "Reece Rag" was written for his friend, Congressman B. Carroll Reece. Bowman also wrote "East Tennessee Blues." Often, Bowman's performances involved musical skits, such as with "Moonshiner and His Money." Bowman's repertoire of traditional songs included "Forked Deer" and "Turkey in the Straw."

== Discography ==
- Rural String Bands of Tennessee (County, 1997)— contains "Moonshiner and His Money" and "Forked Deer", recorded by Charlie Bowman and His Brothers
- The Hill Billies, Al Hopkins and His Buckle Busters, Complete Recorded Works in Chronological Order three volumes, (Document DOCD-8039, 8040, 8041, 1999
