= Mountain City, Tennessee =

Mountain City
- Town
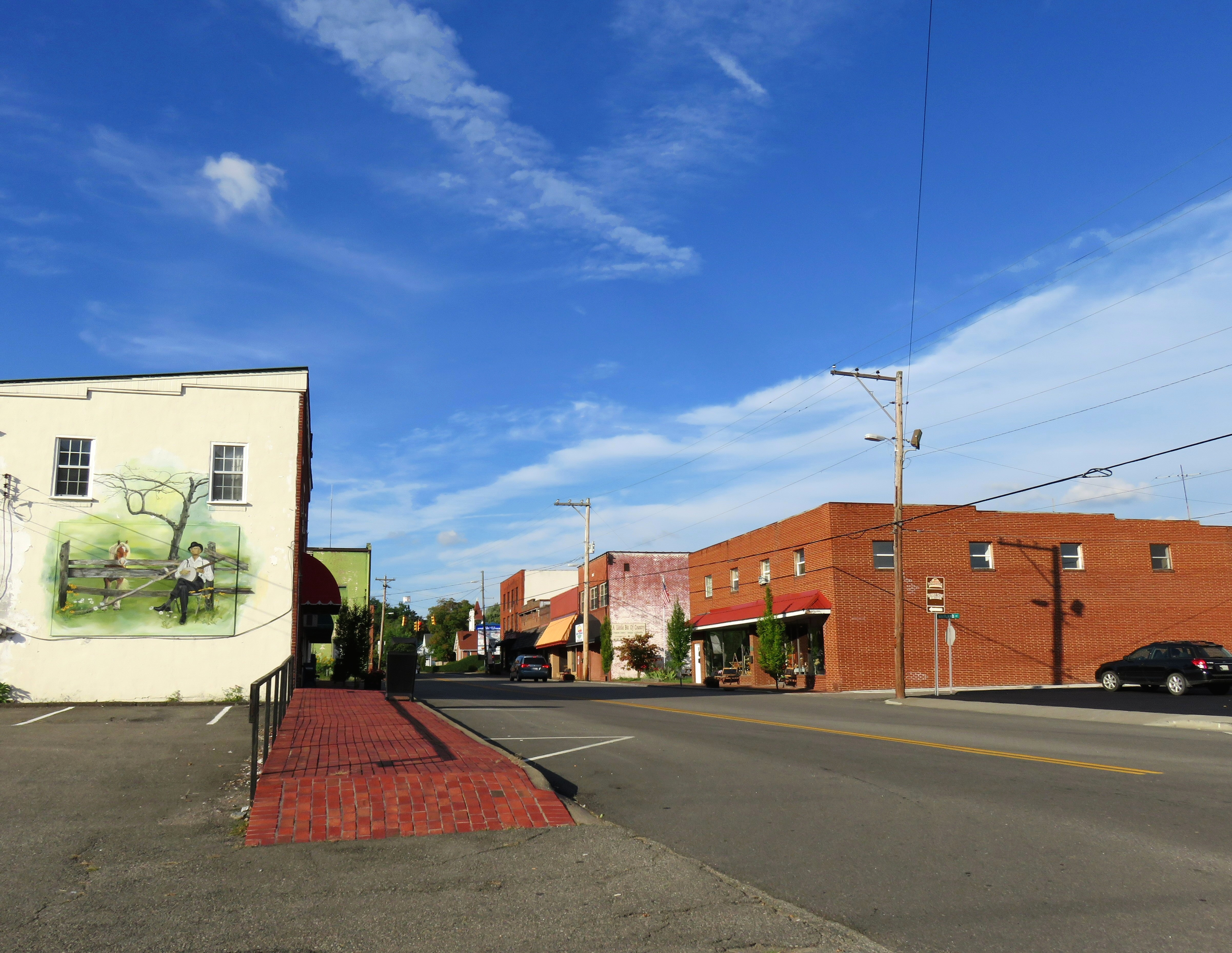
- Buildings along Church Street

- Location of Mountain City in Johnson County, Tennessee.
- Coordinates: 36°28′6″N 81°48′14″W
- Country: United States
- State: Tennessee
- County: Johnson
- Founded: 1836
- Incorporated: 1905

Government
  - Type: Mayor-Alderman
  - Mayor: Jerry S. Jordan

Area
  - Total: 3.37 sq mi (8.73 km^{2})
  - Land: 3.37 sq mi (8.73 km^{2})
  - Water: 0 sq mi (0.00 km^{2})
- Elevation: 2,418 ft (737 m)

Population (2020)
  - Total: 2,415
  - Density: 716.5/sq mi (276.66/km^{2})
- Time zone: UTC-5 (Eastern (EST))
  - Summer (DST): UTC-4 (EDT)
- ZIP code: 37683
- Area code: 423
- FIPS code: 47-50400
- GNIS feature ID: 1328969
- Website: www.mountaincitytn.org

Mountain City is a town in and the county seat of Johnson County, Tennessee, United States. The population was 2,415 at the 2020 census. It is the northeasternmost county seat in Tennessee. In addition, at an elevation of 2,418 feet (737 m), it has the distinction of being the highest incorporated city in the state.

== History ==
When the first European explorers arrived in what is now the Mountain City area in the late 17th century, well-worn Native American trails passed through the area. In 1949, workers at the Maymead quarry (just south of Mountain City) discovered a cave with several early Mississippian-era (ca. 1000 A.D.) burials inside. The Needham and Arthur expedition of 1673 is believed to have passed through the area, making use of the gap at Trade to the south. Explorer Daniel Boone made use of the same gap on an expedition to what is now Kentucky in 1769, and today part of the Daniel Boone Heritage Trail—which follows Boone's route—passes through Mountain City.

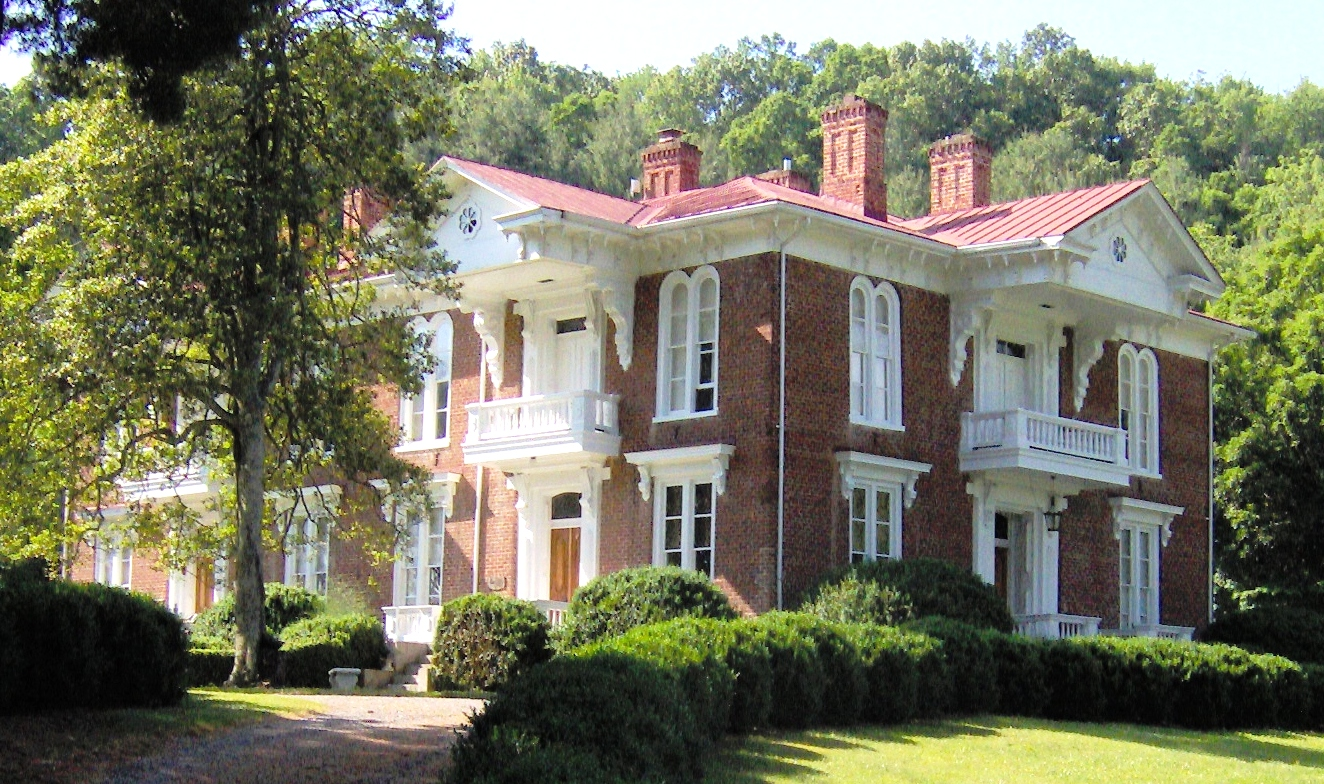
Roderick Butler house

The first permanent white settlers arrived in the Mountain City area in the late 18th century, among them Leonard Shoun and Revolutionary War veteran Alexander Doran. The area was initially part of Carter County, but the difficulty of reaching Elizabethton (the county seat) led to the creation of Johnson County in 1836. That year, a county seat for the new county was platted on land purchased from William Vaught and named Taylorsville after Colonel James P. Taylor. The name of the town was changed to "Mountain City" in 1885, presumably at the urging of Roderick R. Butler, a prominent citizen and U.S. Congressman who wanted the town's name to reflect its situation amidst one of the highest valleys in Tennessee. Butler's mansion, now listed on the National Register of Historic Places, still stands near the center of the town.

In May 1925, Mountain City was the site of a musical gathering, the first Mountain City Fiddlers Convention, that is considered a landmark event in the modern history of Appalachian music. The gathering contributed significantly to the development of country music and is commemorated every summer at the Old Time Fiddler's Convention in nearby Laurel Bloomery.

Since 1982, Mountain City has been home to a luxury inn and country club, now known as the RedTail Mountain Resort. It is the northeasternmost gated community in Tennessee.

== Geography ==
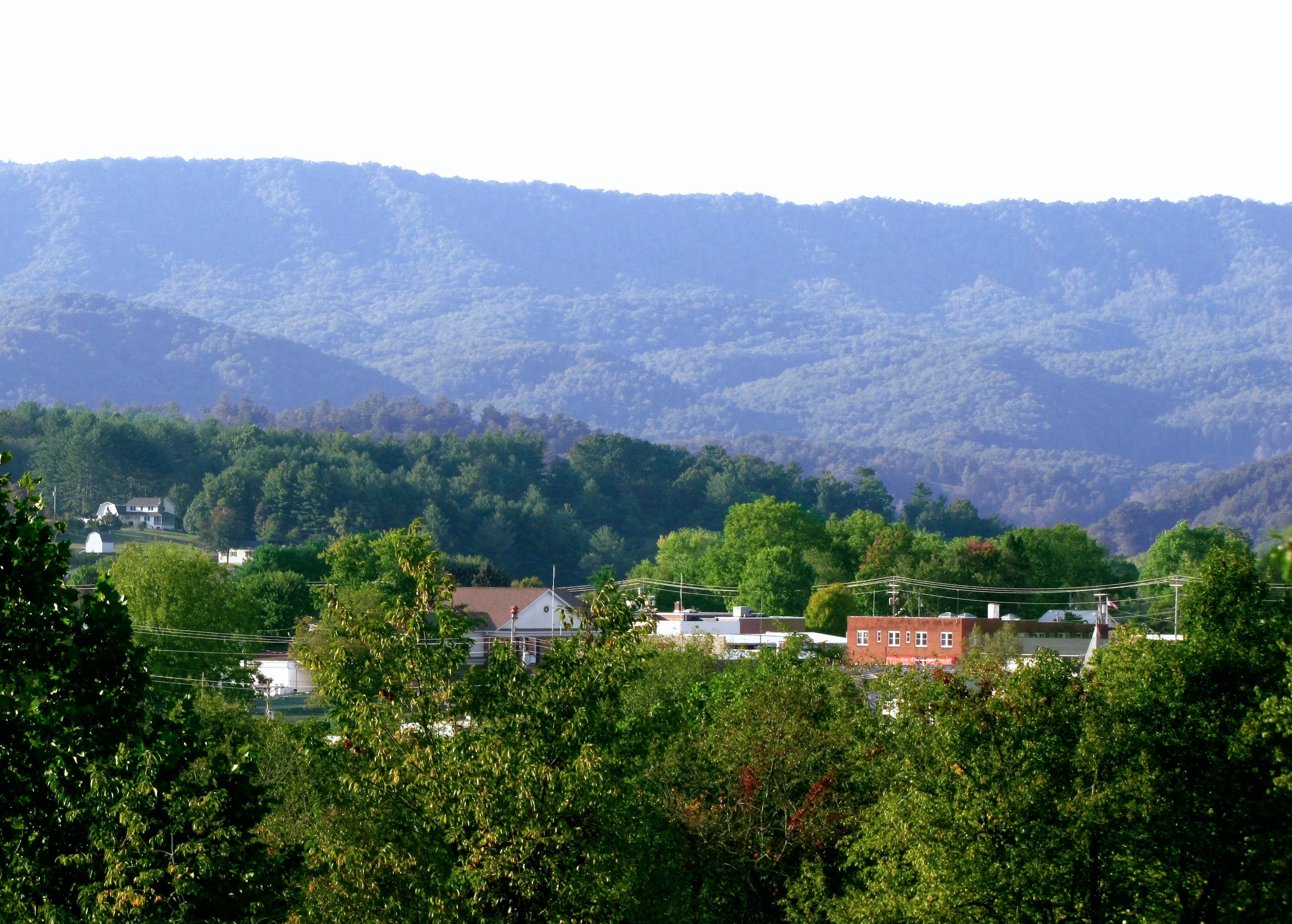
Mountain City, viewed from Sunset Memorial Park; the Iron Mountains rise in the background.

Mountain City is located at 36°28′6″N 81°48′14″W (36.468444, -81.803856). According to the United States Census Bureau, the town has a total area of 3.3 square miles (8.6 km^{2}), all land. At just over 2,400 feet (730 m), Mountain City is situated in one of the highest valleys in the state of Tennessee. Doe Mountain rises to the southwest, Forge Mountain rises to the east, and the Iron Mountains rise prominently to the north. The Tennessee-North Carolina border runs opposite Forge Mountain approximately 5 miles (8.0 km) east of Mountain City, and the Tennessee-Virginia border passes about 10 miles (16 km) to the north.

U.S. Route 421 (Shady Street) connects Mountain City with Bristol, Tennessee, to the northwest and Boone, North Carolina, to the southeast. Tennessee State Route 67 traverses the Doe Creek Valley on the north side of Doe Mountain and connects Mountain City with Carter County and the Watauga Lake areas to the west. State Route 167 follows the Roan Creek Valley on the south side of Doe Mountain, rejoining S.R. 67 at Shouns in the southern part of Mountain City. Tennessee State Route 91 connects Mountain City to Laurel Bloomery, Tennessee, and Damascus, Virginia, to the north (the road becomes Virginia State Route 91 at the state line).

== Demographics ==
Historical population
Census	Pop.	Note	%±
1850	118		—
1860	159		34.7%
1870	236		48.4%
1880	278		17.8%
1890	249		−10.4%
1910	592		—
1920	724		22.3%
1930	1,058		46.1%
1940	1,021		−3.5%
1950	1,405		37.6%
1960	1,379		−1.9%
1970	1,883		36.5%
1980	2,125		12.9%
1990	2,169		2.1%
2000	2,383		9.9%
2010	2,531		6.2%
2020	2,415		−4.6%

=== 2020 census ===
Mountain City racial composition
Race	Number	Percentage
White (non-Hispanic)	2,170	89.86%
Black or African American (non-Hispanic)	25	1.04%
Native American	8	0.33%
Asian	12	0.5%
Pacific Islander	2	0.08%
Other/Mixed	85	3.52%
Hispanic or Latino	113	4.68%

As of the 2020 United States census, there were 2,415 people, 873 households, and 458 families residing in the town.

=== 2000 census ===
As of the census of 2000, there were 2,383 people, 1,136 households, and 664 families residing in the town. The population density was 720.8 inhabitants per square mile (278.3/km^{2}). There were 1,250 housing units at an average density of 378.1 per square mile (146.0/km^{2}). The racial makeup of the town was 97.86% White, 0.92% African American, 0.25% Native American, 0.25% Asian, 0.29% from other races, and 0.42% from two or more races. Hispanic or Latino of any race were 0.80% of the population.

There were 1,136 households, out of which 22.4% had children under the age of 18 living with them, 42.3% were married couples living together, 12.5% had a female householder with no husband present, and 41.5% were non-families. 38.3% of all households were made up of individuals, and 18.9% had someone living alone who was 65 years of age or older. The average household size was 2.05 and the average family size was 2.71.

In the town, the population was spread out, with 19.2% under the age of 18, 7.0% from 18 to 24, 26.4% from 25 to 44, 26.7% from 45 to 64, and 20.7% who were 65 years of age or older. The median age was 43 years. For every 100 females, there were 89.3 males. For every 100 females age 18 and over, there were 83.9 males.

The median income for a household in the town was $16,587, and the median income for a family was $31,406. Males had a median income of $26,042 versus $19,145 for females. The per capita income for the town was $17,202. About 21.6% of families and 27.1% of the population were below the poverty line, including 37.4% of those under age 18 and 20.6% of those age 65 or over.

== Climate ==
The all-time record low in Mountain City on December 30, 1917, at −32 °F (−36 °C), is tied with Mount Le Conte for Tennessee's statewide record low. Mountain City has a subtropical highland (Köppen Cfb) with monthly averages ranging from 34 °F (1 °C) to 71 °F (22 °C) in January and July, respectively. Under the Trewartha climate classification, it is a temperate oceanic (Do) climate with only 7 months having a mean 50 °F (10 °C) or higher.

Climate data for Mountain City, Tennessee (1991–2020 normals, extremes 1956–present)
Month	Jan	Feb	Mar	Apr	May	Jun	Jul	Aug	Sep	Oct	Nov	Dec	Year
Record high °F (°C)	76 (24)	79 (26)	85 (29)	88 (31)	89 (32)	97 (36)	97 (36)	95 (35)	94 (34)	91 (33)	83 (28)	77 (25)	97 (36)
Mean maximum °F (°C)	65.6 (18.7)	67.7 (19.8)	74.4 (23.6)	81.4 (27.4)	84.1 (28.9)	87.5 (30.8)	88.0 (31.1)	87.4 (30.8)	85.4 (29.7)	80.7 (27.1)	74.2 (23.4)	67.5 (19.7)	89.6 (32.0)
Mean daily maximum °F (°C)	45.5 (7.5)	48.8 (9.3)	56.7 (13.7)	66.8 (19.3)	73.9 (23.3)	79.9 (26.6)	82.0 (27.8)	81.4 (27.4)	76.9 (24.9)	68.2 (20.1)	58.0 (14.4)	48.9 (9.4)	65.6 (18.7)
Daily mean °F (°C)	34.2 (1.2)	37.1 (2.8)	44.0 (6.7)	53.0 (11.7)	61.3 (16.3)	68.1 (20.1)	71.2 (21.8)	70.3 (21.3)	64.7 (18.2)	54.5 (12.5)	44.6 (7.0)	37.6 (3.1)	53.4 (11.9)
Mean daily minimum °F (°C)	23.0 (−5.0)	25.4 (−3.7)	31.3 (−0.4)	39.2 (4.0)	48.6 (9.2)	56.4 (13.6)	60.4 (15.8)	59.2 (15.1)	52.5 (11.4)	40.9 (4.9)	31.2 (−0.4)	26.3 (−3.2)	41.2 (5.1)
Mean minimum °F (°C)	2.0 (−16.7)	8.1 (−13.3)	13.4 (−10.3)	23.7 (−4.6)	32.6 (0.3)	42.8 (6.0)	49.7 (9.8)	48.0 (8.9)	38.0 (3.3)	24.7 (−4.1)	15.6 (−9.1)	8.4 (−13.1)	−0.8 (−18.2)
Record low °F (°C)	−20 (−29)	−18 (−28)	−11 (−24)	14 (−10)	22 (−6)	28 (−2)	36 (2)	35 (2)	28 (−2)	10 (−12)	2 (−17)	−32 (−36)	−32 (−36)
Average precipitation inches (mm)	3.74 (95)	3.36 (85)	4.09 (104)	4.33 (110)	5.15 (131)	4.48 (114)	5.03 (128)	4.13 (105)	3.26 (83)	2.81 (71)	2.89 (73)	3.89 (99)	47.19 (1,199)
Average snowfall inches (cm)	3.4 (8.6)	5.0 (13)	1.1 (2.8)	0.1 (0.25)	0.0 (0.0)	0.0 (0.0)	0.0 (0.0)	0.0 (0.0)	0.0 (0.0)	0.0 (0.0)	0.4 (1.0)	2.0 (5.1)	12.0 (30)
Average precipitation days (≥ 0.01 in)	9.0	9.4	10.0	9.5	11.8	11.7	11.5	10.0	8.2	6.8	7.3	9.0	114.2
Average snowy days (≥ 0.1 in)	1.5	1.7	0.7	0.1	0.0	0.0	0.0	0.0	0.0	0.0	0.3	0.8	5.1
Source: NOAA

== Arts and culture ==
Mountain City is the location of the Johnson County Welcome Center & Museum. The center offers tourism information about the county and the museum showcases the history of the area and has a large collection of Native American and pioneer objects. Johnson County Center for the Arts is a comprehensive arts center serving the residents of Johnson County and the surrounding area. Long Journey Home is Johnson County's Heritage Arts and music celebration held every Labor Day weekend. The Steve Earle song "Copperhead Road" is set in the vicinity of Mountain City.

== Notable people ==
- Clarence Ashley (1895–1967), folk musician
- Roderick R. Butler (1827–1902), U.S. congressman
- Dave Loggins (1947-2024), musician and songwriter, best known for the song "Please Come to Boston"
- Jeff Reynolds (b. 1956), college basketball coach
- Clyde Shoun (1912–1968), Major League Baseball pitcher

== Gallery ==
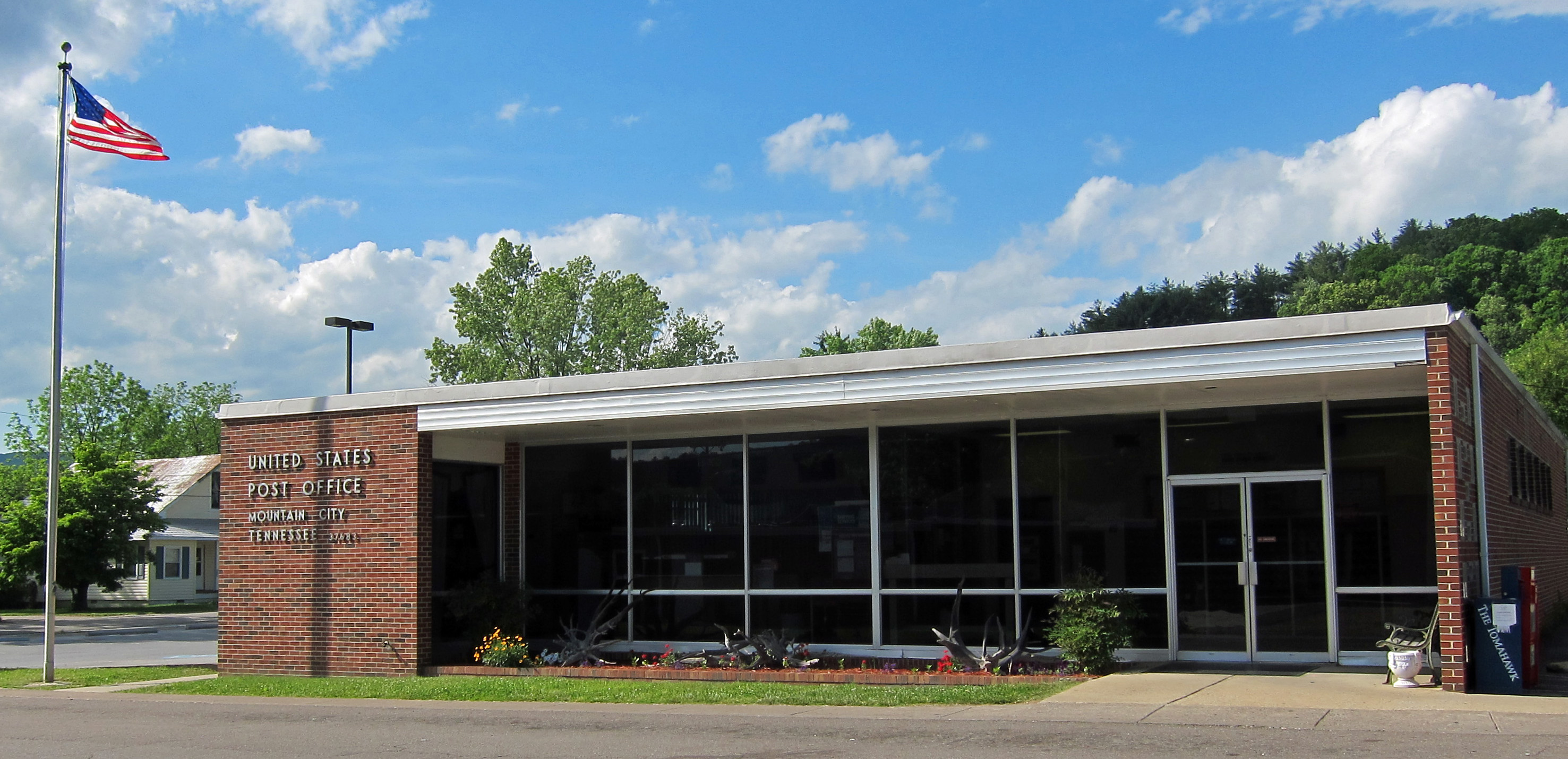
U.S. Post Office, Mountain City

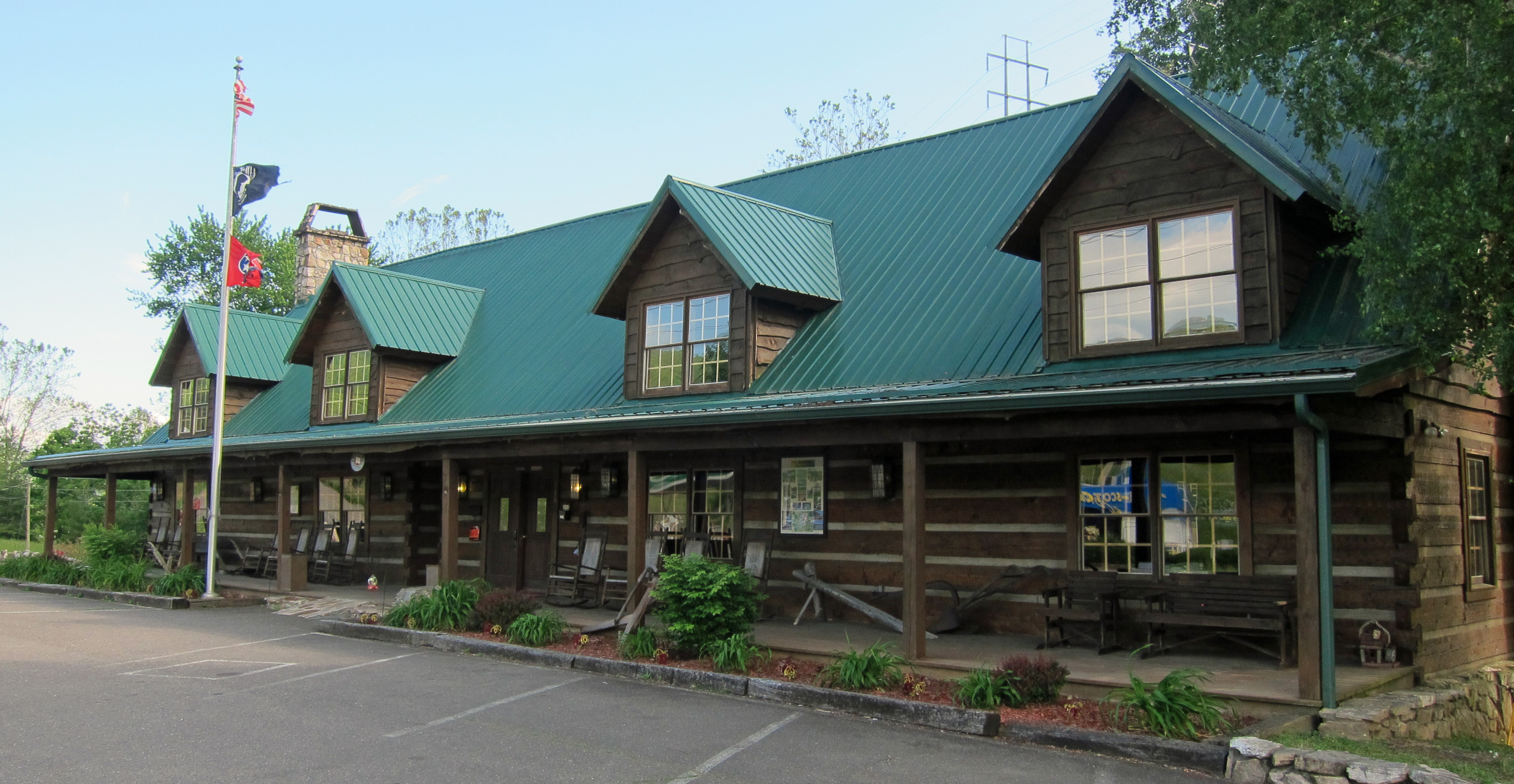
Johnson County Welcome Center, Mountain City

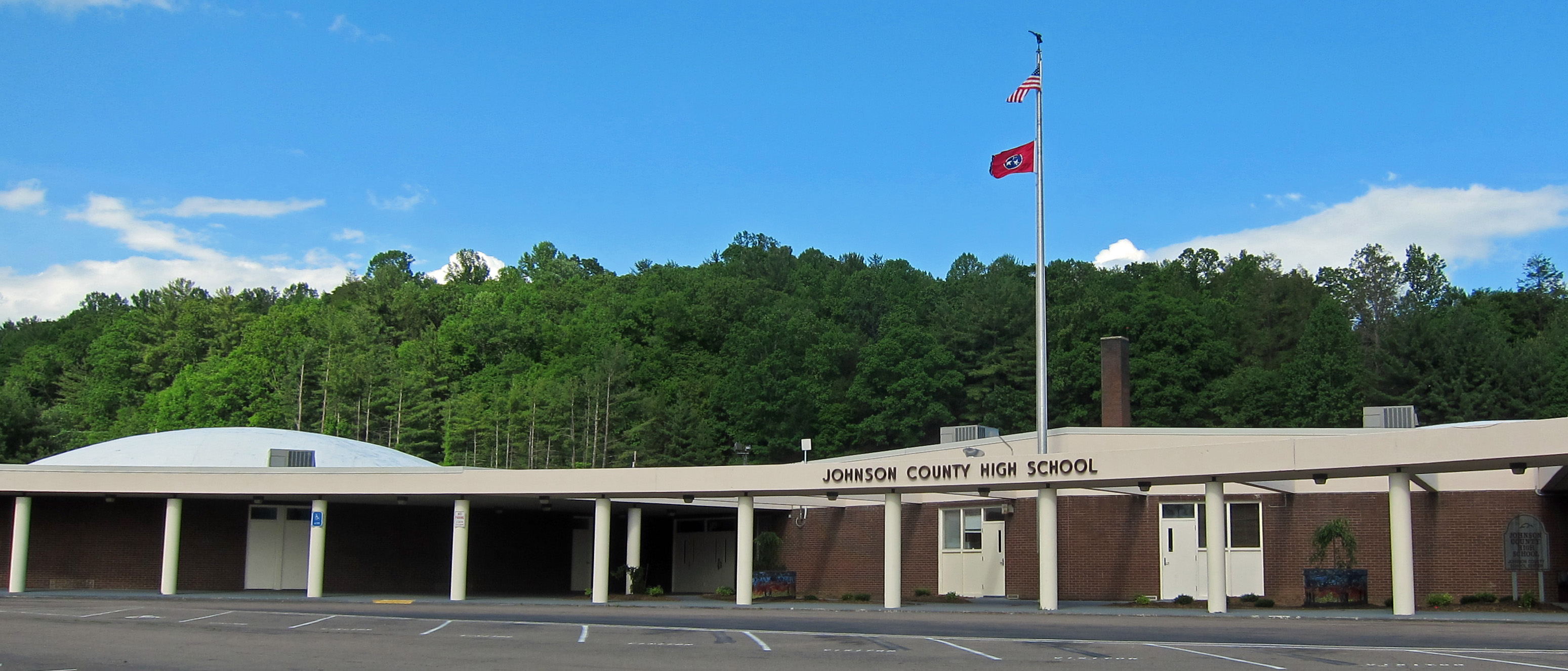
Johnson County High School, Mountain City, home of the Longhorns

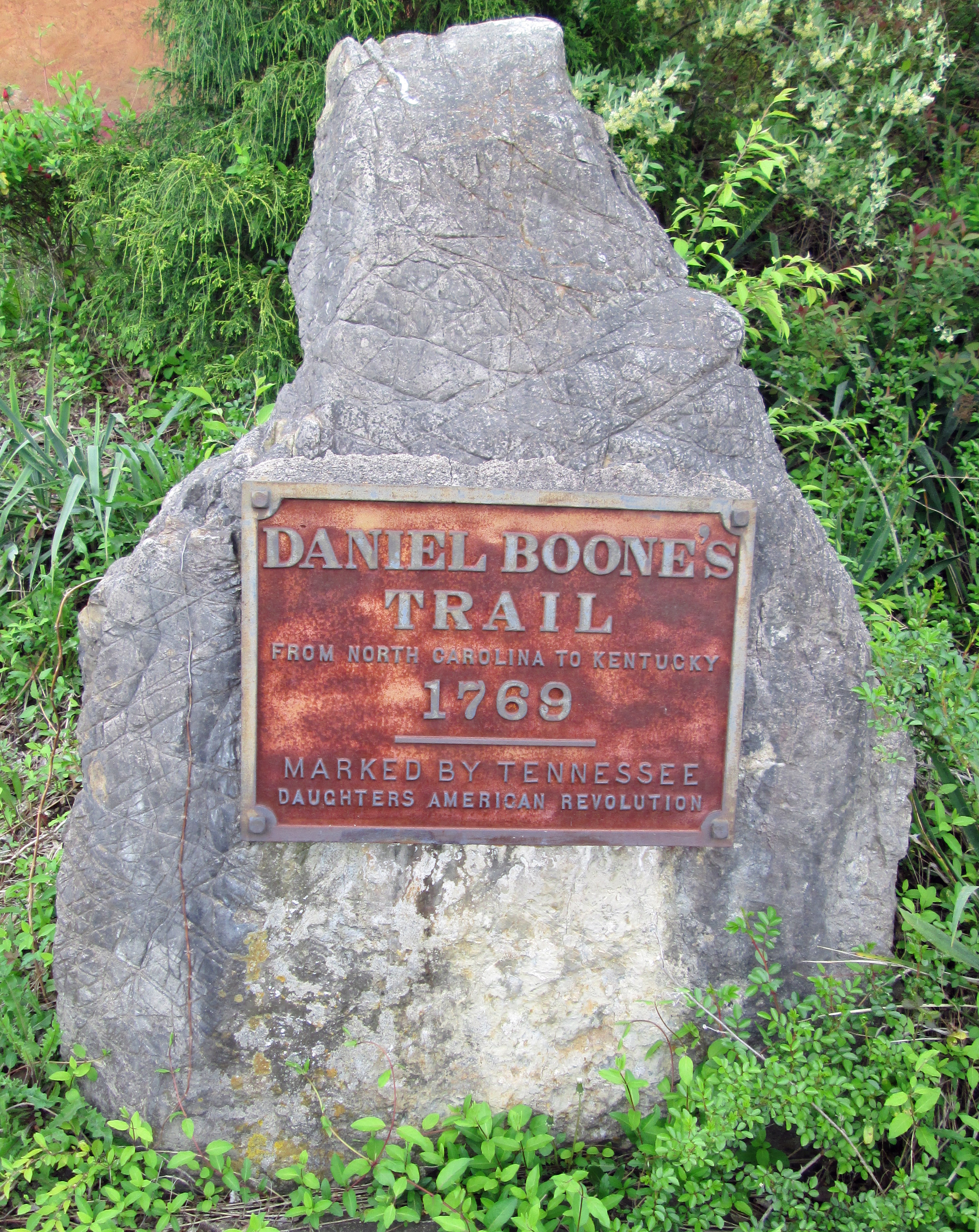
Daniel Boone trail marker on Forge Creek Road (Hwy 167), Mountain City

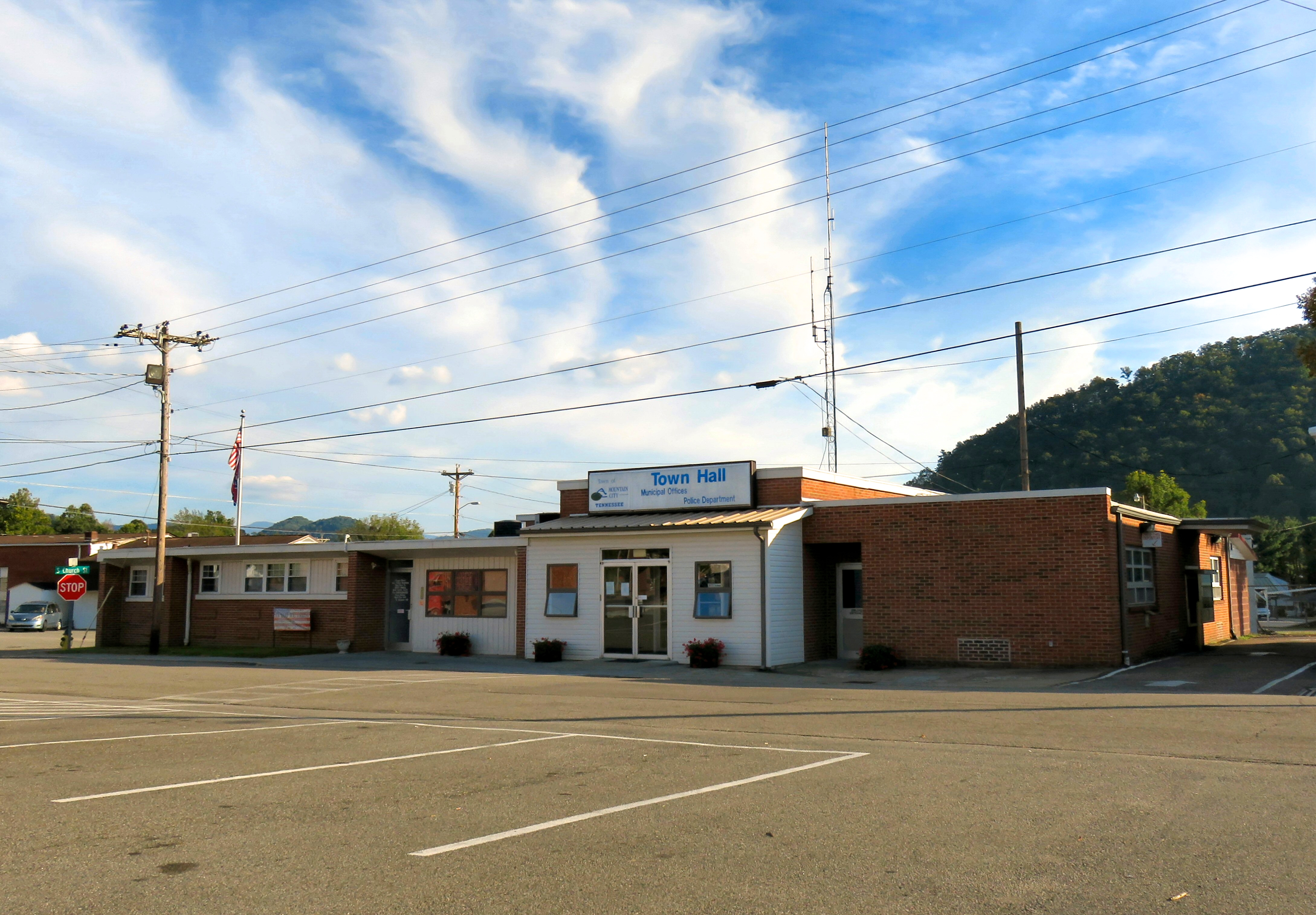
Town hall
