= Doc Watson discography =

Cataloging of published recordings by Doc Watson

- Studio albums: 38
- Live albums: 16
- Compilation albums: 23
- Singles: 14

Doc Watson's discography includes principal albums as a solo artist, as well as with his son Merle Watson, The Watson Family and as collaborator with other artists.

== Studio and live albums ==
Year	Album	Chart positions	
Year	Album	US Country	US
1964	Doc Watson		
1965	Doc Watson & Son		
1966	Southbound		
1966	Home Again!		
1968	Doc Watson in Nashville: Good Deal!		
1971	Ballads From Deep Gap		
1971	Doc Watson on Stage (live)		
1972	The Elementary Doctor Watson!	44	
1973	Then and Now	44	
1974	Two Days in November		
1975	Memories	47	193
1976	Doc and the Boys	41	
1977	Lonesome Road		
1978	Look Away!		
1979	Live and Pickin' (live)		
1981	Red Rocking Chair		
1983	Doc and Merle Watson's Guitar Album		
1984	Down South		
1985	Pickin' the Blues		
1986	Riding the Midnight Train		
1987	Portrait		
1990	On Praying Ground		
1990	Songs for Little Pickers (live)		
1991	My Dear Old Southern Home		
1992	Remembering Merle		
1995	Docabilly		
1999	Third Generation Blues		
2002	Legacy		
2002	Round the Table Again (live)		
2017	Bear's Sonic Journals: Never the Same Way Once (live)		

== With The Watson Family or The Doc Watson Family ==
Year	Album
1964	Treasures Untold (live)
1977	Tradition (live)
1990	The Watson Family (1990 Reissue of Folkways 2366 from 1963. SFW40012 (Cassette, CD).
1994	Songs from the Southern Mountains (live)

== Collaborations ==
Year	Album	Chart positions		
Year	Album	US Bluegrass	US Country	US
1961	Old Time Music at Clarence Ashley's, Vol. 1 (live)			
1963	Old Time Music at Clarence Ashley's, Vol. 2 (live)			
1967	Old-Timey Concert (with Clint Howard and Fred Price) (live)			
1967	Strictly Instrumental (with Flatt and Scruggs)			
1972	Will the Circle Be Unbroken (with Nitty Gritty Dirt Band)	#1	#4	#8
1980	Reflections (with Chet Atkins)			
1990	Jean Ritchie and Doc Watson at Folk City (1990). Reissue of FA2426 from 1963. SFW40005 (Cassette, CD).			
1993	Live Recordings 1963-1980: Off the Record Volume 2 (with Bill Monroe) (1993) SFW40064 (Cassette, CD).			
1994	Original Folkways Recordings of Doc Watson and Clarence Ashley, 1960-1962 (1994) SFW40029 (Cassette, CD).			
1997	Doc & Dawg (with David Grisman)			
1998	Del Doc & Mac (with Del McCoury and Mac Wiseman)			
2003	The Three Pickers (with Earl Scruggs and Ricky Skaggs)	2	24	179

== Compilations ==
Year	Album	Chart positions
Year	Album	US Bluegrass
1973	The Best of Doc Watson	
1973	The Essential Doc Watson	
1983	Favorites	
1994	Original Folkways Recordings: 1960–1962	
1995	The Vanguard Years	
1996	Watson Country	
1996	Then and Now/Two Days in November	
1997	Elementary Doctor Watson!/Then and Now	
1998	Home Sweet Home	
1999	The Best of Doc Watson: 1964–1968	
2000	Foundation: Doc Watson Guitar Instrumental Collection, 1964–1998	
2001	Doc Watson at Gerdes Folk City (live)	
2002	Then and Now/Two Days in November	
2002	14 Fabulous Tracks	
2002	Lonesome Road/Look Away!	
2002	Songs from Home	
2003	Trouble in Mind: Doc Watson Country Blues Collection	
2003	Doc and the Boys/Live and Pickin'	
2003	Tennessee Stud	
2004	Sittin' Here Pickin' the Blues	
2006	Black Mountain Rag	
2007	Vanguard Visionaries	
2008	Americana Master Series: Best of Doc Watson	
2013	The Definitive Doc Watson	13

== Singles ==
Year	Single	US Country	Album
1973	"Bottle of Wine" (with Merle Watson)	71	Then and Now
1978	"Don't Think Twice, It's All Right" (with Merle Watson)	88	Look Away!
