= Sittin' Here Pickin' the Blues =

Compilation album by Doc Watson, Merle Watson
- Released: Apr 6, 2004
- Genre: Folk, blues
- Label: Rounder
- Producer: Mitch Greenhill

Doc Watson chronology
Trouble in Mind (2003)	Sittin' Here Pickin' the Blues (2004)	Black Mountain Rag (2006)

Sittin' Here Pickin' the Blues is the title of a recording by American folk music and country blues artists Doc Watson and Merle Watson, released in 2004. It contains songs taken from albums that Doc and Merle recorded on the Flying Fish label in the 1980s. It contains all the songs from Pickin' the Blues, three from Doc and Merle Watson's Guitar Album, three from Red Rocking Chair and a live version of "Deep River Blues".

== Reception ==
Professional ratings
Review scores
Source	Rating
Allmusic	4/5 stars

Writing for Allmusic, music critic Ronnie D. Lankford Jr. wrote of the album "Perhaps the greatest treat, though, is the guitar playing. On a number of cuts—including "Freight Train Blues," "Hobo Bill's Last Ride," and "Mississippi Heavy Water Blues"—Merle Watson plays slide, while Doc Watson brings his distinct fingerpicking style to each cut. Sittin' Here Pickin' the Blues also offers a few nice surprises, like versions of "Stormy Weather" and "St. Louis Blues." This is a superb collection, sure to please Watson fans, guitar players, and anyone who enjoys honest acoustic music."

== Track listing ==
All songs traditional unless otherwise noted.

1. "Freight Train Blues" – 2:47
2. "Hobo Bill's Last Ride" (Jimmie Rodgers) – 3:46
3. "Mississippi Heavy Water Blues" (Barbeque Bob) – 2:55
4. "Did You Hear John Hurt?" (Tom Paxton) – 2:31
5. "John Henry/Worried Blues" – 2:26
6. "I'm a Stranger Here" (Brownie McGhee, Terry) – 3:17
7. "Talking to Casey" (Coleman) – 2:30
8. "Blue Ridge Mountain Blues" – 2:53
9. "Any Old Time" (Jimmie Rodgers) – 2:27
10. "Sittin' Here Pickin' the Blues" (Coleman, Watson) – 3:14
11. "Stormy Weather" (Harold Arlen, Ted Koehler) – 3:56
12. "How Long Blues" (Leroy Carr) – 2:49
13. "Honey Babe Blues" (W. C. Handy) – 3:29
14. "St. Louis Blues" (W. C. Handy) – 3:10
15. "Carroll County Blues" – 2:58
16. "California Blues" (Jimmie Rodgers) – 3:24
17. "Goin' to Chicago Blues" – 4:07
18. "Jailhouse Blues" (Sleepy John Estes) – 2:51
19. "Windy and Warm" (John D. Loudermilk) – 2:13
20. "Deep River Blues" – 3:22

== Personnel ==
- Doc Watson – vocals, guitar, banjo, harmonica
- Merle Watson – guitar, slide guitar
- Tony Rice – guitar
- T. Michael Coleman – bass, harmony vocals
- Sam Bush, Mark O'Connor – fiddle, mandolin
- Ron Tutt – drums
- Pat McInerney – percussion
- Tom Scott – clarinet
- Charlie Musselwhite – harmonica
- Herb Pedersen, Joe Smothers – harmony vocals
