= The Vanguard Years (Doc Watson album) =

Compilation album by Doc Watson
- Released: November 14, 1995
- Recorded: 1963–1968
- Genre: Folk, blues
- Length: 172:34
- Label: Vanguard
- Producer: Mary Katherine Aldin (compilation)

Doc Watson chronology
Docabilly (1995)	The Vanguard Years (1995)	Watson Country (1996)

The Vanguard Years is the title of an album by American folk music, old-time music and blues artist Doc Watson, released in 1995.

This four CD collection contains 64 tracks which he recorded between 1963 and 1968 during his years with Vanguard Records. It includes guests such as Gaither Carlton, Clarence White and Merle Travis. There are 16 previously unreleased live performances of duets with Doc and his son, Merle.

== Reception ==
Professional ratings
Review scores
Source	Rating
Allmusic	4.5/5 stars
No Depression	(no rating)

Music critic Richie Unterberger praises the release in his review for Allmusic writing "This was Doc's best period recording-wise, and certainly you couldn't hope for a better document of his virtuosity" but also qualifies his review, writing "It's too much, however, for listeners who aren't big fans; Vanguard's Essential Doc Watson is a more economical survey. If you are a big fan, though, you'll be especially interested in the 16 previously unreleased performances."

Mark Ray of No Depression wrote "By definition, The Vanguard Years is not a completist’s collection, although it is an expansive project, and much of Watson’s most popular work is represented here. More interesting, though, is the lesser-known material, on which Watson can be heard evolving his famous flatpicking style... The Vanguard Years is a definitive statement on Watson as an innovator. But it also stands as a testament to the effect a musician’s label can have on their career."

== Track listing ==
1. "Rambling Hobo" (traditional) – 0:57
2. "Train That Carried My Girl From Town" (traditional) – 2:03
3. "The Coo Coo Bird" (traditional) – 2:46
4. "Reuben's Train" (traditional) – 2:29
5. "Hicks' Farewell" (traditional) – 3:34
6. "Grandfather's Clock" (Henry Clay Work) – 1:26
7. "Beaumont Rag" (traditional) – 1:44
8. "Farewell Blues" (traditional) – 1:48
9. "Footprints in the Snow" (traditional) – 2:03
10. "Intoxicated Rat" (Dorsey Dixon, Mainer) – 2:33
11. "Talk About Suffering" (traditional) – 2:50
12. "Omie Wise" (traditional) – 4:29
13. "Country Blues" (Dock Boggs) – 3:33
14. "Black Mountain Rag " (traditional) – 1:32
15. "Doc's Guitar" (Doc Watson) – 1:18
16. "Deep River Blues" (traditional) – 3:09
17. "Muskrat" (traditional) – 2:54
18. "Dream of the Miner's Child" (Andrew Jenkins) – 2:47
19. "Rising Sun Blues" (traditional) – 4:17
20. "Otto Wood the Bandit" (Walter "The Kid" Smith) – 3:17
21. "Little Sadie" (traditional) – 2:01
22. "Windy and Warm" (John D. Loudermilk) – 2:15
23. "Tennessee Stud" (Jimmy Driftwood) – 3:38
24. "Blue Railroad Train" (Alton Delmore, Rabon Delmore) – 2:45
25. "Down in the Valley to Pray" (traditional) – 2:02
26. "Dill Pickle Rag" (traditional) – 1:25
27. "The F.F. V." (Watson, Watson) – 4:03
28. "Childhood Play" (Alfred Karnes) – 1:59
29. "Sreamline Cannonball" – 2:27
30. "Old Camp Meeting Time" (traditional) – 2:50
31. "I'm Thinking Tonight of My Blue Eyes"
32. "The Girl in the Blue Velvet Band"
33. "New River Train" (traditional) – 3:27
34. "Rank Stranger" – 3:20
35. "Corrine, Corrina" (traditional) – 3:09
36. "What Does the Deep Sea Say" (traditional) – 2:53
37. "There's More Pretty Girls Than One" (traditional) – 2:29
38. "Way Downtown" – 3:14
39. "Brown's Ferry Blues" – 2:55
40. "Spike Driver Blues" (traditional) – 2:23
41. "Roll on Buddy" (traditional) – 2:41
42. "I Am a Pilgrim" (traditional) – 2:29
43. "Wabash Cannonball" (traditional) – 2:11
44. "Roll in My Sweet Baby's Arms" (Lester Flatt) – 2:16
45. "The Lawson Family Murder" (Smith) – 3:04
46. "The Cuckoo" (traditional) – 2:53
47. "Alabama Bound" (traditional) – 2:39
  Previously unreleased tracks:
48. "Bye Bye Bluebells" (traditional) – 2:49
49. "Kinfolks in Carolina" (traditional) – 2:48
50. "San Antonio Rose" (Bob Wills) – 3:31
51. "Blow Your Whistle Freight Train" (Alton Delmore, Rabon Delmore) – 2:47
52. "Cannonball Rag" – 3:05
53. "I Am a Pilgrim" – 2:32
54. "Arrangement Blues" (traditional) – 2:09
55. "I Got a Pig at Home in the Pen" – 2:53
56. "My Rough and Rowdy Ways" (Elsie McWilliams, Jimmie Rodgers) – 4:09
57. "Deep River Blues" (traditional) – 2:06
58. "The Banks of the Ohio" (traditional) – 2:33
59. "A-Roving on a Winter's Night" (traditional) – 2:58
60. "Southbound" (traditional) – 4:01
61. "Memphis Blues" – 3:47
62. "Salt Creek/Bill Cheatham" (traditional) – 2:54
63. "Brown's Ferry Blues" (traditional) – 3:09
64. "Windy and Warm" (Loudermilk) – 2:38

== Personnel ==
- Doc Watson – guitar, harmonica, vocals
- Merle Watson – guitar, banjo
- Clarence Ashley – banjo, vocals
- Gaither Carlton – fiddle
- Clint Howard – guitar, vocals
- Fred Price – fiddle
- Arnold Watson – banjo, vocals
- Clarence White – guitar
- Merle Travis - guitar, vocals
