= Tennessee Stud (disambiguation) =

"Tennessee Stud" is a song by Jimmy Driftwood.

Tennessee Stud may also refer to:

- Tennessee Stud (album), a 2003 album by Doc Watson featuring the above song
- Tennessee Stud, a ring name of wrestler Ron Fuller
