= Jack Lawrence (bluegrass) =

American guitarist (born 1953)

- Born: October 5, 1953 (age 72); Charlotte, North Carolina, U.S.
- Genres: Bluegrass music
- Occupation: Musician
- Instruments: Guitar, 1945 Martin D-18 (named "Arthel")
- Years active: 1970–present
- Labels: G Run, Little King
- Website: jacklawrence.com

Jack Lawrence is an American bluegrass guitarist. He was Doc Watson's performing partner since the early 1980s. As major influences, Lawrence cites Doc Watson, Clarence White, and Django Reinhardt.

== Biography ==
=== Early years ===
Lawrence was raised in Charlotte, North Carolina His father began work as a sound engineer for a local music hall when Lawrence was age 10. This allowed him to meet and learn from some performers such as Buck Owens, Don Rich, Bill Monroe, George Shuffler, and Flatt and Scruggs. In his teens, Lawrence played in local folk and bluegrass groups. A job with luthier C. E. Ward in Charlotte introduced Lawrence to Carl Story, and landed him his first professional job in 1970.

=== Early career ===
In 1971, Lawrence joined the progressive bluegrass ensemble New Deal String Band, which also included Frank Greathouse (mandolin) and Al McCanless (fiddle). Then in 1972, he joined the Bluegrass Alliance, replacing Tony Rice and joining Lonnie Peerce (fiddle), Steve Maxwell (bass), Chuck Nation (mandolin), and Garland Shuping (banjo, vocal). This lineup recorded the album Tall Grass on the Bridges label in 1973, and Lawrence left in 1974. After a second stint with the New Deal String Band, Jack played electric guitar in rock and country bands for several years.

In 1978, Lawrence formed a folk duo with Joe Smothers. Through Smothers, Lawrence met Doc Watson and his son Merle Watson.

=== Doc Watson ===
1983, began working with Doc Watson in concerts and on recordings as Merle pursued other interests. When Merle died in 1985, Lawrence became Doc's full-time musical partner.

In 2015, Lawrence coordinated a Doc Watson Guitar Tribute set at MerleFest, with participation by Sam Bush, David Holt, Stephen Mougin, Tim Stafford, Roy Book Binder, T. Michael Coleman, and Jack's son, Adam Lawrence.

=== Other projects ===
Lawrence released his first solo album About Time in 1997, and in 2002, he released I Don't Need The Whiskey Anymore, featuring Sam Bush, Jerry Douglas, Tony Williamson, the Del McCoury Band, and Doc Watson.

In 2013, Lawrence released Arthel's Guitar album, using Arthel "Doc" Watson's guitar on the recording. The album contains bluegrass and fiddle tunes performed with Curtis Burch and Dale Meyer (resonator guitar), Wayne Benson (mandolin), Don Lewis and Shadd Cobb (fiddle), Steve Lewis (banjo), Ron Shuffler (bass), and Jody Call (drums, percussion). The album also includes several unreleased tracks by Watson.

Lawrence has performed in and recorded with the ToneBlazers, along with Billy Gee (bass), Dale Meyer (resonator guitar), Jim Ashton (banjo, pedal steel), Jody Call (percussion), and Randy Gambill (guitar, mandolin).

=== Personal life ===
Lawrence and his wife Katie live in Harrisburg, North Carolina. They have three children: Matthew, Adam and Jenny.

== Discography ==
=== Solo recordings ===
- 1997: About Time (G Run)
- 2002: I Don't Need the Whiskey Anymore (G Run)
- 2013: Arthel's Guitar (Little King)

=== With Joe Smothers ===
- 1981: Smothers/Lawrence (Park St.)

=== With Doc Watson ===
- 1987: Portrait (Sugar Hill)
- 1990: On Praying Ground (Sugar Hill)
- 1990: Songs for Little Pickers (Sugar Hill)
- 1991: My Dear Old Southern Home (Sugar Hill)
- 1995: Docabilly (Sugar Hill)
- 1997: Doc & Dawg (Acoustic Disc) with David Grisman
- 1998: Del Doc & Mac (Sugar Hill) with Del McCoury and Mac Wiseman
- 2002: Doc's Guitar Jam DVD (Vestapol) with Dan Crary, Steve Kaufman, and Tony Rice (recorded at Merefest 1992)
- 2014: Doc Watson and David Grisman In Concert DVD (Vestapol)
- 2016: The Bottom Line Archive: Doc Watson (Bottom Line)

=== With the ToneBlazers ===
- 2011: Red Clay Roots (Little King)
- 2012: Grass Roots (Little King)
- 2013: Gold Rush Town (Little King)

=== Also appears on ===
- 1980: The Roustabouts - 2001 A Bluegrass Odyssey (Lamon)
- 1989: Mike Auldridge - Treasures Untold (Sugar Hill)
- 2001: Candlewyck - Wilkes County Breakdown (Votive)
- 2003: Sam Bush and David Grisman - Hold On, We're Strummin' (Acoustic Disc)
- 2005: various artists - Tone Poets (Acoustic Disc) - track 2-06, "Were You There"
- 2006: Jimmy Gaudreau - In Good Company (CMH)
- 2006: Bryan Sutton - Not Too Far from the Tree (Sugar Hill)
