= Trouble in Mind =

Trouble in Mind may refer to:

== Music ==
- "Trouble in Mind" (song), a 1924 song by Richard M. Jones
- Trouble in Mind (George Jones album), 1966
- Trouble in Mind (Archie Shepp album), 1980
- Trouble in Mind (Big Bill Broonzy album), 2000
- Trouble in Mind (Elkie Brooks and Humphrey Lyttelton album), 2003
- Trouble in Mind: Doc Watson Country Blues Collection, 2003 country album
- Trouble in Mind (Hayes Carll album), 2008
- Trouble in Mind (EP), 2015 extended play album by Lee Ann Womack
- Trouble in Mind (Jodie Marie album), 2015
- "Trouble in Mind", an unreleased Bob Dylan song from the early 1980s.
- "Trouble in Mind", a 2016 song by Larkin Poe
- Trouble in Mind, a defunct independent record label.

== Other media ==
- Trouble in Mind, 1955 drama play by Alice Childress
- Trouble in Mind (film), 1985 neo-noir
- Trouble in Mind (TV series), 1991 television series starring Richard O'Sullivan
- Trouble in Mind: Black Southerners in the Age of Jim Crow, 1998 book by Leon F. Litwack
