= Ballads from Deep Gap =

Studio album by Doc Watson, Merle Watson
- Released: 1971
- Recorded: 1971
- Genre: Folk, country blues
- Length: 35:22
- Label: Vanguard
- Producer: Jack Lothrop

Doc Watson chronology
| Doc Watson in Nashville: Good Deal! (1968) | Ballads from Deep Gap (1971) | Doc Watson on Stage (1971) |

Ballads from Deep Gap is the second studio album by American folk music artist Doc Watson and Merle Watson, copyright on some songs in 1967, released in 1971. The title references the town Watson was born in — Deep Gap, North Carolina.

Two of the songs were co-written with fiddler Gaither Carlton, Doc's father-in-law.

== Reception ==
Professional ratings
Review scores
| Source | Rating |
|---|---|
| Allmusic | 4.5/5 stars |

Writing for Allmusic, music critic Jim Smith wrote of the album "The largely overlooked Ballads from Deep Gap features a great song list and some of Doc & Merle Watson's best early playing."

== Track listing ==
1. "Roll in My Sweet Baby's Arms" (Traditional) – 2:49
2. "My Rough and Rowdy Ways" (Elsie McWilliams, Jimmie Rodgers) – 2:28
3. "The Wreck of the Old Number Nine" (Carson Robison) – 2:55
4. "Gambler's Yodel" (Alton Delmore, Rabon Delmore) – 2:55
5. "The Cuckoo" (Traditional) – 2:46
6. "Stack-O-Lee" (Traditional) – 3:50
7. "Willie Moore" (Traditional) – 4:00
8. "Travelin' Man" (Traditional) – 3:28
9. "Tragic Romance" (Grandpa Jones) – 3:18
10. "Texas Gales" (Molly O'Day) – 1:30
11. "The Lawson Family Murder" (Walter "Kid" Smith) – 2:36
12. "Alabama Bound" (Traditional) – 2:47

== Personnel ==
- Doc Watson – guitar, harmonica, banjo, vocals
- Merle Watson – guitar, banjo
- Eric Weissberg – bass

Production notes

- Jack Lothrop – producer
- Clalude Karczmer – engineer
- Bill Vernon – liner notes
