= Songs from Home =

Songs from Home may refer to:

- Songs from Home (Doc Watson and Merle Watson album), 2002
- Songs from Home (Ronan Keating album), 2021
- Songs from Home: Live Concert Recording, a 2004 album by Lea Salonga
