= Americana Master Series =

Americana Master Series may refer to:

- Americana Master Series: Best of the Sugar Hill Years, an album by Guy Clark
- Americana Master Series (Doc Watson album)
