= Songs for Little Pickers =

Live album by Doc Watson
- Released: 1990
- Recorded: Centre Stage, Atlanta, GA March 24, 1990; Newport Folk Festival, Newport, RI, August 21, 1988; Archival recording, Folklore Productions
- Genre: Folk
- Length: 34:15
- Label: Sugar Hill
- Producer: Mitch Greenhill

Doc Watson chronology
On Praying Ground (1990)	Songs for Little Pickers (1990)	My Dear Old Southern Home (1991)

Songs for Little Pickers is a live album by American folk music artist Doc Watson, released in 1990. It contains songs Watson learned as a child.

Professional ratings
Review scores
Source	Rating
Allmusic	3/5 stars

== Track listing ==
All songs Traditional unless otherwise noted.

1. "Talkin' Guitar" – 2:31
2. "Mole in the Ground" – 2:39
3. "Mama Blues" – 1:38
4. "Froggie Went A-Courtin'" – 4:04
5. "Shady Grove" – 2:48
6. "Riddle Song" – 2:41
7. "Sing Song Kitty " – 2:20
8. "John Henry" – 4:23
9. "Sally Goodin' " – 0:55
10. "Crawdad Song" – 2:31
11. "And the Green Grass Grew All Around" – 2:50
12. "Liza Jane" – 1:58
13. "Tennessee Stud" (Jimmie Driftwood) – 4:38

== Personnel ==
- Doc Watson – guitar, ‘juice’ harp, harmonica, vocals
- Jack Lawrence – guitar

Production notes

- Produced by Mitch Greenhill
- Engineered and mixed by Chuck Eller
