= Black Mountain Rag =

Compilation album by Doc Watson, Merle Watson
- Released: September 19, 2006
- Genre: Folk, blues
- Label: Rounder
- Producer: Mitch Greenhill, Tony Rice, Norman Blake

Doc Watson chronology
Sittin' Here Pickin' the Blues (2004)	Black Mountain Rag (2006)	Vanguard Visionaries (2008)

Black Mountain Rag is the title of a recording by American folk music and country blues artists Doc Watson and Merle Watson, released in 2006. It contains songs taken from albums that Doc and Merle recorded on the Flying Fish label in the 1980s.

A 1990 trio bonus track of "Blackberry Blossom" with Doc, Norman Blake and Tony Rice is included.

== Reception ==
Professional ratings
Review scores
Source	Rating
Allmusic	4/5 stars

Writing for Allmusic, music critic Steve Leggett wrote of the album "... what is immediately striking about this compilation is how varied it is, even as it settles nicely into familiar 'Watson country.' Again, there's no such thing as a bad Doc Watson album, and this one, like all the others, shows why he's a true national treasure."

== Track listing ==
1. "Black Mountain Rag" (Traditional) – 2:42
2. "Smoke, Smoke, Smoke" (Merle Travis, Tex Williams) – 2:47
3. "Black Pine Waltz" (Traditional) – 2:34
4. "Red Rocking Chair" (Traditional, Watson) – 2:06
5. "Twinkle, Twinkle" (Traditional) – 3:04
6. "Below Freezing" (Coleman) – 2:20
7. "Mole in the Ground" (Traditional) – 2:30
8. "Liza/Lady Be Good" (George Gershwin, Ira Gershwin, Gus Kahn) – 2:56
9. "Down Yonder" (Traditional) – 2:23
10. "Cotton Row" (Traditional) – 2:47
11. "Sadie" (T. Michael Coleman, Byron Hill) – 2:30
12. "Leaving London" (Tom Paxton) – 2:32
13. "Guitar Polka" (Dexter, Paris) – 2:22
14. "Fisher's Hornpipe/Devil's Dream" (Traditional) – 1:44
15. "Along the Road" (Dan Fogelberg) – 2:52
16. "Bye Bye Bluebelle/Smiles" (Travis) – 2:13
17. "Sheeps in the Meadow/Stoney Fork" (Traditional) – 2:53
18. "Take Me Out to the Ball Game" (Jack Norworth, Albert Von Tilzer) – 2:17
19. "Blackberry Blossom" (Traditional) – 3:15
20. "Gonna Lay Down My Old Guitar" (Alton Delmore, Rabon Delmore) – 2:31

== Personnel ==
- Doc Watson – vocals, guitar, banjo, harmonica
- Merle Watson – guitar, dobro, banjo, slide guitar
- T. Michael Coleman – bass, harmony vocals
- Herb Pedersen – harmony vocals
- Mark O'Connor – fiddle, mandolin
- Tony Rice – guitar
- Norman Blake – mandolin
- Ron Tutt – drums
- Gene Estes, Hank Kahn – percussion
- Al Perkins – pedal steel guitar
- Charlie Musselwhite – harmonica
- Byron Berline – fiddle
- Tom Scott – clarinet
- Pat McInerney – drums, percussion
