= Home Again! (Doc Watson album) =

Studio album by Doc Watson
- Released: 1966
- Genre: Folk, blues
- Length: 40:17
- Label: Vanguard
- Producer: Ralph Rinzler

Doc Watson chronology
Southbound (1966)	Home Again! (1966)	Ballads from Deep Gap (1967)

Home Again! is the fourth studio album American folk music artist Doc Watson, released in 1966.

Two of the songs were co-written with fiddler Gaither Carlton, Doc's father-in-law.

== Reception ==
Professional ratings
Review scores
Source	Rating
Allmusic	3/5 stars

Writing for Allmusic, music critic Bruce Eder called the album "his most affecting folk-style record, with unexpectedly warm vocals matched to the quiet virtuosity of his playing... This album was a great showcase for Watson's voice — vaguely similar to but rougher-hewn than Burl Ives — which is often overlooked in the aura of his playing."

== Track listing ==
1. "Down in the Valley to Pray" (Traditional) – 2:01
2. "Georgie" (Gaither Carlton, Doc Watson) – 2:48
3. "The Old Man Below" (Carlton, Watson) – 2:07
4. "Katie Morey" (Traditional) – 2:25
5. "F. F.V." (Annie Watson, Watson) – 4:04
6. "A-Rovin' on a Winter's Night" (Dolly Greer, Watson) – 3:25
7. "Dill Pickle Rag" (Traditional) – 1:26
8. "Sing Song Kitty" (Traditional) – 2:19
9. "Froggie Went A-Courtin'" (Traditional) – 4:07
10. "Pretty Saro" (Traditional) – 2:45
11. "Childhood Play" (Alfred G. Karnes) – 2:00
12. "Rain Crow Bill" (Henry Whitter) – 1:47
13. "Matty Groves" (Dolly Greer, Doc Watson, Stewart Yonce) – 6:07
14. "Victory Rag" (Maybelle Carter) – 1:44

== Personnel ==
- Doc Watson – guitar, 12-string guitar on track #7, vocals, banjo, harmonica on tracks #8 and #12
- Merle Watson – guitar
- Russ Savakus – bass
