= Tomkins Knob =

Mountain in North Carolina, United States

Tomkins Mountain
- Location within North Carolina Location within the United States

Highest point
- Elevation: 4,075 ft (1,242 m)
- Coordinates: 36°14′26″N 81°28′38″W

Geography
- Location: Ashe / Watauga / Wilkes counties, North Carolina, U.S.
- Parent range: Blue Ridge Mountains
- Topo map: USGS Maple Springs

Tomkins Mountain (variant names: Thomkins Knob, Thompkins Knob and Tompkins Knob) is a mountain in the North Carolina High Country, near the community of Deep Gap. The majority of the mountain is within the Blue Ridge Parkway. Its elevation reaches 4,075 feet (1,242 m) and it also marks the corner between Ashe, Watauga, and Wilkes counties.

Split along the Eastern Continental Divide, it generates feeder streams to both the South Fork New River (via West Fork Pine Swamp Creek) and Yadkin River (via South Prong Lewis Fork). Laurel Spur Ridge juts out south from the mountain; while Husons Ridge goes northwest, marking the Ashe/Watauga county line.
