= Vanguard Visionaries (Doc Watson album) =

Compilation album by Doc Watson
- Released: June 12, 2007
- Genre: Folk, blues
- Label: Vanguard

Doc Watson chronology
Black Mountain Rag (2006)	Vanguard Visionaries (2007)	Americana Master Series: Best of Doc Watson (2008)

Vanguard Visionaries is a compilation album by American folk music and country blues artist Doc Watson, released in 2007.

== History ==
Vanguard Records had a high profile during the 1960s folk revival and released music by many folk artists such as Watson, Odetta, and John Fahey. To celebrate their 60th anniversary, Vanguard released a series of artist samplers called Vanguard Visionaries from the 1960s and early-1970s era. It contains a small track listing and all the tracks are available on other compilation packages.

== Reception ==
Professional ratings
Review scores
Source	Rating
AllMusic	3.5/5 stars

Writing for AllMusic, music critic Steve Leggett wrote "A true American treasure, Watson recorded some ten albums for Vanguard in the 1960s beginning in 1964, each full of his rich, everyman singing and startling guitar and banjo skills. This brief sampler is representative of Watson's work with the label..."

== Track listing ==
All songs Traditional unless otherwise noted.

1. "Country Blues" – 3:30
2. "Rising Sun Blues" – 4:16
3. "Little Sadie" – 1:59
4. "Muskrat" – 2:52
5. "Dill Pickle Rag" – 1:24
6. "Beaumont Rag" – 1:42
7. "Shady Grove" – 2:57
8. "Black Mountain Rag" – 1:32
9. "Tennessee Stud" (Jimmie Driftwood) – 3:37
10. "Windy and Warm" (John D. Loudermilk) – 2:12

== Personnel ==
- Doc Watson – vocals, guitar, banjo, harmonica
