= Memories (Doc Watson album) =

Studio album by Doc Watson
- Released: 1975
- Recorded: 1975
- Studios: Jack Clement Recording (Nashville, Tennessee)
- Genres: Bluegrass; folk
- Length: 61:21
- Label: United Artists UA-LA423-H2 0798
- Producer: Chuck Cochran

Doc Watson chronology
Two Days in November (1974)	Memories (1975)	Doc and the Boys (1976)

Memories is the title of a studio album by American country music artist Doc Watson, released in 1975. It was originally released as a double-LP by United Artists Records. It peaked at No. 47 on Billboard Country Albums charts and No. 193 on the Pop Album charts.

Guy Clark included a reference to Watson and his performance of "Columbus Stockade Blues" in the lyrics in his song "Dublin Blues": "I have seen the David, seen the Mona Lisa too, and I have heard Doc Watson play Columbus Stockade Blues."

Sugar Hill re-issued Memories on CD in 1993. It has also been re-issued by Gott Discs.

Professional ratings
Review scores
Source	Rating
Allmusic	4.5/5 stars
Rolling Stone	(not rated)

== Track listing ==
1. "Rambling Hobo" (Doc Watson) – 1:55
2. "Shady Grove" (Traditional) – 2:42
3. "Wake Up, Little Maggie" (Gaither Carlton, Doc Watson) – 2:53
4. "Peartree" (Gaither Carlton, Doc Watson) – 2:21
5. "Keep on the Sunny Side" (A. P. Carter, Gary Garett) – 2:09
6. "Double File and Salt Creek" (Traditional) – 1:42
7. "Curly Headed Baby" (Lillian Leatherman, Lucille Leatherman) – 2:59
8. "Miss the Mississippi and You" (Bill Halley) – 3:42
9. "Wabash Cannonball" (A. P. Carter) – 3:03
10. "My Rose of Old Kentucky" (Bill Monroe) – 2:40
11. "Blues Stay Away from Me" (Alton Delmore, Rabon Delmore, Alton Glover, Wayne Raney) – 2:51
12. "Walking Boss" – 2:24
13. "Make Me a Pallet" (Joe Parrish) – 3:02
14. "In the Jailhouse Now" (Jimmie Rodgers) – 3:30
15. "Steel Guitar Rag" (Leon McAuliffe, Cliff Stone, Merle Travis) – 1:58
16. "Hang Your Head in Shame" (Ed G. Nelson, Steve Nelson, Fred Rose) – 2:44
17. "You Don't Know My Mind Blues" (Samuel H. Gray, Virginia Liston, Clarence Williams) – 3:11
18. "Moody River" (Gary D. Bruce) – 2:36
19. "Don't Tell Me Your Troubles" (Don Gibson) – 2:48
20. "Columbus Stockade" (Jimmie Davis, Eva Sagent) – 3:18
21. "Mama Don't Allow No Music" (Traditional) – 4:15
22. "Thoughts of Never" (Merle Watson) – 2:38

== Personnel ==
- Doc Watson – guitar, harmonica, banjo, vocals
- Merle Watson – guitar, banjo, dulcimer, slide guitar, steel guitar
- Joe Allen – bass
- Sam Bush – fiddle, mandolin, vocals, harmony vocals
- Courtney Johnson – banjo
- Jim Isbell – drums, percussion
- Joe Smothers – guitar, harmony vocals
- Chuck Cochran – bass, piano, organ
- T. Michael Coleman – bass, background vocals

Production notes

- Produced by Chuck Cochran
- Mastering by Larry Boden
- Re-mastering by Andrew Thompson
- Photography by Jim McGuire
- Design by Beverly Parker
- Art direction by Bob Cato
- Liner notes by Merle Travis and Chet Flippo
- Engineering and mixing by Garth Fundis
