= Southbound (Doc Watson album) =

Studio album by Doc Watson
- Released: 1966
- Recorded: 1966
- Genre: Folk, blues
- Length: 36:53
- Label: Vanguard

Doc Watson chronology
Doc Watson and Son (1965)	Southbound (1966)	Home Again! (1966)

Southbound is the second studio album by American folk music artist Doc Watson, released in 1966.

== Reception ==
Professional ratings
Review scores
Source	Rating
Allmusic	5/5 stars

Writing for Allmusic, music critic Thom Owens called the album a pivotal release for Watson, writing "... it demonstrated that Watson was capable of more than just dazzling interpretations of folk songs, but that he could also write excellent original material and rework new country songs in a fascinating manner."

== Track listing ==
1. "Walk On Boy" (Mel Tillis, Wayne Walker) – 3:23
2. "Blue Railroad Train" (Alton Delmore, Rabon Delmore) – 2:44
3. "Sweet Georgia Brown" (Ken Casey, Ben Bernie, Maceo Pinkard) – 1:55
4. "Alberta" (Traditional) – 2:43
5. "Southbound" (Doc Watson, Merle Watson) – 2:49
6. "Windy And Warm" (John D. Loudermilk) – 2:14
7. "Call Of The Road" (Doc Watson) – 2:20
8. "Tennessee Stud" (Jimmie Driftwood) – 3:37
9. "That Was The Last Thing on My Mind" (Tom Paxton) – 2:46
10. "Little Darlin' Pal of Mine" (A. P. Carter) – 2:43
11. "Nothing To It" (Doc Watson) – 2:02
12. "The Riddle Song" (Traditional) – 2:43
13. "Never No Mo' Blues" (Elsie W. McWilliams, Jimmie Rodgers)– 3:13
14. "Nashville Pickin'" (John Pilla, Doc Watson) – 1:52

== Personnel ==
- Doc Watson – guitar, vocals
- Merle Watson – guitar
- John Pilla – guitar
- Russ Savakus – double bass
