= Watson Country =

Compilation album by Doc Watson, Merle Watson
- Released: June 1996
- Recorded: Dec 1980 – Nov 1984
- Genre: Folk, blues
- Length: 48:13
- Label: Flying Fish
- Producer: Mitch Greenhill, Merle Watson

Doc Watson chronology
The Vanguard Years (1995)	Watson Country (1996)	Doc & Dawg (1997)

Watson Country is a 1996 compilation of music by American folk music and country blues artists Doc Watson and Merle Watson. The collection is taken from the albums Watson recorded for Flying Fish Records between 1980 and 1984. It contains two previously unreleased tracks: "Bye Bye Bluebelle/Smiles" and "Leaving London".

== Reception ==
Professional ratings
Review scores
Source	Rating
Allmusic	4/5 stars

Writing for Allmusic, music critic Rick Anderson wrote of the album "It has the smooth Nashville production characteristic of his albums of the time, but that's not really a flaw — even if it takes some of the leather out of his playing, having a full backing band extends his appeal beyond the hillbilly curtain, and to many ears, that's a good thing... Doc recorded many albums in this style, but for newcomers this is a nice sampler of his middle years."

== Track listing ==
1. "Smoke, Smoke, Smoke" (Merle Travis, Tex Williams) – 2:49
2. "Along the Road" (Dan Fogelberg) – 2:53
3. "Sheeps in the Meadow/Stoney Fork" (Traditional) – 2:56
4. "Blue Ridge Mountain Blues" (Traditional) – 2:55
5. "California Blues" (Jimmie Rodgers) – 3:22
6. "Down Yonder" (Traditional) – 2:24
7. "Any Old Time" (Jimmie Rodgers) – 2:29
8. "Bye Bye Bluebelle/Smiles" (Travis) – 2:15
9. "Leaving London" (Tom Paxton) – 2:32
10. "Red Rocking Chair" (Traditional, Watson) – 2:06
11. "Black Pine Waltz" (Traditional) – 2:35
12. "Freight Train Blues" (Traditional) – 2:48
13. "Hobo Bill's Last Ride" (Jimmie Rodgers) – 3:47
14. "Jailhouse Blues" (Sleepy John Estes) – 2:52
15. "Sadie" (T. Michael Coleman, Byron Hill) – 2:31
16. "Fisher's Hornpipe/Devil's Dream" (Traditional) – 1:45
17. "Sittin' Here Pickin' the Blues" (Coleman, Watson) – 3:15
18. "Gonna Lay Down My Old Guitar" (Alton Delmore, Rabon Delmore) – 2:32

== Personnel ==
- Doc Watson – vocals, guitar, harmonica
- Merle Watson – guitar, dobro, banjo
- T. Michael Coleman – bass, harmony vocals
- Herb Pedersen – harmony vocals
- Ron Tutt – drums
- Gene Estes – percussion
- Hank "Bones" Kahn – bones
- Al Perkins – pedal steel guitar
- Charlie Musselwhite – harmonica
- Byron Berline – fiddle
- Sam Bush – fiddle, mandolin
- Pat McInerney – drums, percussion
- Mark O'Connor – fiddle, mandolin
- Tom Scott – clarinet
- Joe Smothers – harmony vocals
