= Two Days in November =

Studio album by Doc Watson and Merle Watson
- Released: 1974
- Studio: Jack Clement Recording (Nashville, Tennessee)
- Genre: Folk, blues, newgrass
- Label: Poppy Records
- Producer: Jack Clement

Doc Watson chronology
The Essential Doc Watson (1973)	Two Days in November (1974)	Memories (1975)

Two Days in November is the title of an album by Doc Watson and Merle Watson, released in 1974. The title refers to the two days it took to complete the recording.

== Reception ==
Professional ratings
Review scores
Source	Rating
AllMusic	4/5 stars

In an AllMusic review, the music critic Lindsay Palmer wrote of the album, "Doc Watson's amplified approach to traditional melodies as well as the reworking of cover material is decidedly modern, yet the interpretations directly hark back to their acoustic counterparts... Seasoned as well as developing enthusiasts of bluegrass, newgrass, traditional country, and Americana agree that Doc & Merle Watson developed and created some of their finest music in the early to mid-'70s..."

At the Grammy Awards of 1975, Two Days in November won the 1974 Grammy Award for Best Ethnic or Traditional Folk Recording.

== Reissues ==
Sugar Hill Records re-issued versions, which excluded some tracks, of both Two Days in November and Then and Now in 1994. BGO Records released both with additional tracks from The Elementary Doctor Watson! in 2002.

== Track listing ==
1. "Walk on Boy" (Mel Tillis, Wayne Walker) 2:44
2. "Poor Boy Blues" (arranged and adapted by Doc Watson and Merle Watson) 2:18
3. "I'm Going Fishing" (arranged and adapted by Doc Watson) 2:40
4. "Kinfolks in Carolina" (Merle Travis) 2:28
5. "Lonesome Moan" (Traditional; arranged and adapted by Doc Watson) 2:51
6. "Medley: Little Beggar Man/Old Joe Clark" (Traditional; arranged and adapted by Doc Watson) 2:07
7. "Kaw-Liga" (Fred Rose, Hank Williams) 2:44
8. "Train That Carried My Girl from Town" (Traditional; arranged by Watson) 2:55
9. "Snowbird" (Gene MacLellan) 2:51
10. "Doc's Rag" (Doc Watson) 1:44

== Personnel ==
- Doc Watson – guitar, harmonica, vocals
- Merle Watson – guitar, banjo
- Kenny Malone – percussion
- Chuck Cochran – piano
- Joe Allen – bass guitar
- Jim Isbell – drums, percussion
