= Riding the Midnight Train =

Studio album by Doc Watson, Merle Watson
- Released: 1986
- Recorded: Studio 19, Nashville, TN
- Genre: Folk, country blues, bluegrass
- Length: 39:07
- Label: Sugar Hill
- Producer: Barry Poss

Doc Watson chronology
Pickin' the Blues (1985)	Riding the Midnight Train (1986)	Portrait (1987)

Riding the Midnight Train is the title of a recording by American folk music artists Doc Watson and Merle Watson, released in 1986. It is the last album Merle Watson recorded before he was killed in a tractor accident.

At the Grammy Awards of 1987, Riding the Midnight Train won the Grammy Award for Best Traditional Folk Album.

Guests include Béla Fleck, Sam Bush and Mark O'Connor.

Professional ratings
Review scores
Source	Rating
Allmusic	3/5 stars

== Track listing ==
1. "I'm Going Back to the Old Home" (Carter Stanley) – 2:11
2. "Greenville Trestle High" (James Jett) – 3:25
3. "Highway of Sorrow" (Bill Monroe, Pete Pyle) – 2:48
4. "Fill My Way With Love" – 2:30
5. "We'll Meet Again Sweetheart" (Lester Flatt, Earl Scruggs) – 2:48
6. "Riding That Midnight Train" (Carter Stanley) – 2:04
7. "Stone's Rag" (Traditional) – 3:20
8. "Ramshackle Shack" (Wade Mainer) – 3:18
9. "Midnight on the Stormy Deep" (Traditional) – 4:31
10. "Baby Blue Eyes" (Jim Eanes) – 3:39
11. "What Does the Deep Sea Say?" (Wade Mainer) – 3:31
12. "Let the Church Roll On" (A. P. Carter) – 2:55
13. "Sweet Heaven When I Die" (Claude Grant) – 2:07

Track 7 "Stone's Rag" omitted from Sugar Hill cassette tape SH-C-3752.

== Personnel ==
- Doc Watson – guitar, vocals
- Merle Watson – guitar, banjo
- T. Michael Coleman – bass, harmony vocals
- Sam Bush – mandolin
- Béla Fleck – banjo
- Mark O'Connor – fiddle
- Alan O'Bryant – guitar, harmony vocals

Production notes

- Produced by Barry Poss
- Engineered and remixed by Richard Adler
- Photography by Will & Deni McIntyre
- Remixing by Barry Poss, Richard Adler, T. Michael Coleman
- Artwork by Raymond Simone
