= David Gahr =

American photographer

- Born: David Gahr; September 18, 1922; Milwaukee, Wisconsin, U.S.
- Died: May 25, 2008 (aged 85); Brooklyn, New York U.S.
- Known for: Photography

David Gahr (September 18, 1922 – May 25, 2008) was an American photographer, known for his work with famous musicians.

== Biography ==
David Gahr was born on September 18, 1922, in Milwaukee, Wisconsin, to Russian immigrant parents. He enlisted in the US Army one day after the attack on Pearl Harbor and served in the infantry in Europe. He was one of the American soldiers who helped liberate concentration camp survivors. After World War II, he studied economics at the University of Wisconsin-Madison on the G.I. Bill and was a George Marshall scholar at Columbia University while working towards a doctorate in economics. He later became one of "the pre-eminent photographers of American folk, blues, jazz and rock musicians of the 1960s and beyond".

A photo of Dolly Parton by Gahr

His photographic output includes more than five decades covering musicians like Phil Spector, Bob Dylan, Miles Davis, Bruce Springsteen, Van Morrison, Janis Joplin, Sonny Terry, John Lennon and Pete Seeger, among others. His book, The Face of Folk Music (Citadel Press, 1968) with writer Robert Shelton captured the exploding American folk music scene, with hundreds of images including Dylan, Joan Baez, Pete Seeger, Judy Collins, Tom Paxton, Phil Ochs, Odetta, Buddy Guy, Junior Wells, Mary Travers and Johnny Cash, among others. He worked on contract for Time Magazine in the mid 1960s to the mid 1970s. He also did many assignments for Conde Nast Publications and The New York Times.

His work is in many major museum collections, including The Metropolitan Museum of Art and The Museum of Modern Art. He also photographed many of the leading post war artists, including the very private Joseph Cornell, with whom he was a personal friend.

Dozens of Wikipedia pages include reference to Gahr's photographs, like those of The Wild, the Innocent & the E Street Shuffle, His Band and the Street Choir, Love, God, Murder, The Fugs First Album, Doc Watson and Son, Doc Watson at Gerdes Folk City, Stages: The Lost Album, The Essential Stevie Ray Vaughan and Double Trouble, and others.

David Gahr died in his home in Brooklyn, New York on May 25, 2008, at the age of 85. He left behind a son and his daughter, Carla Gahr (also a NYC-based photographer, who, with her father, managed the David Gahr photography studio and archives).
