= Fire Scale Mountain =

Mountain in North Carolina, US

- Location within North Carolina Location within the United States

Highest point
- Elevation: 3,845 ft (1,172 m)
- Coordinates: 36°13′59″N 81°29′30″W

Geography
- Location: Watauga County, North Carolina, U.S.
- Parent range: Blue Ridge Mountains
- Topo map: USGS Maple Springs

Fire Scale Mountain is a mountain in the North Carolina High Country, near the community of Deep Gap. The majority of the mountain is within the Blue Ridge Parkway. Its elevation reaches 3,845 feet (1,172 m).

Split along the Eastern Continental Divide, it generates feeder streams to both the South Fork New River (via Gap Creek) and Yadkin River (via Stony Fork). Ivy Point Ridge juts out southeasterly from the mountain, which is used by US 421 to transition from the Foothills to the Mountains. Deep Gap is a natural gap adjacent to the mountain; it provides both the name of the nearby community and the intersection of the Blue Ridge Parkway and US 421.
