= Look Away! =

Studio album by Doc Watson and Merle Watson
- Released: 1978
- Recorded: January–February 1978
- Studio: The Sound Shop, Nashville, TN
- Genre: Folk, blues
- Length: 28:29
- Label: United Artists
- Producer: Mitch Greenhill, Merle Watson

Doc Watson chronology
Tradition (1977)	Look Away! (1978)	Live and Pickin' (1979)

Look Away! is the title of a recording by Doc Watson and Merle Watson, released in 1978.

Look Away! is out-of-print and was re-issued on CD in 2002 by Southern Music packaged with Lonesome Road!.

== Reception ==
Professional ratings
Review scores
Source	Rating
Allmusic	2.5/5 stars

Writing for Allmusic, music critic Mark Allan wrote of the album "No album by this wonderful picker and his equally adept son could be without merit, although the material is not as consistently strong as they deserve."

== Track listing ==
1. "Florida Blues" (Traditional) – 1:45
2. "Don't Think Twice, It's All Right" (Bob Dylan) – 2:47
3. "My Love Come Rolling Down" (Eric Von Schmidt) – 3:29
4. "Gypsy Davie" (Traditional) – 3:25
5. "'Rangement Blues" (Traditional) – 2:51
6. "You Two-Timed Me One Time Too Often" (Jenny Lou Carson) – 2:06
7. "Blues in My Mind" (Fred Rose) – 2:27
8. "It's a Crazy World" (Mac McAnally) – 2:41
9. "Under the Double Eagle" (Traditional) – 2:26
10. "God Holds the Future" (Traditional) – 2:53
11. "Dixie" (Traditional) – 1:35
  Additional tracks on the Southern Music release:
12. "New Born King" – 3:01
13. "Peace in the Valley" (Thomas A. Dorsey) – 3:02

== Personnel ==
- Doc Watson – vocals, guitar, harmonica
- Merle Watson – guitar, dobro
- T. Michael Coleman – bass, background vocals
- Johnny Gimble – fiddle
- Gene Scrivenor – harmonica
- Jim Isbell – drums, percussion
- Marcia Routh – background vocals
- Lisa Silver – background vocals
- Pebble Daniel – background vocals
