= Tradition (Doc Watson album) =

Studio album by Doc Watson
- Released: 1977
- Recorded: September 1964–May 1965
- Genre: Folk, blues
- Label: Rounder
- Producer: Ralph Rinzler

Doc Watson chronology
Lonesome Road (1977)	Tradition (1977)	Look Away! (1978)

Tradition (subtitled The Doc Watson Family) is the title of a recording by Doc Watson and Family. It was recorded in 1964 - 1965 and not released until 1977.

Professional ratings
Review scores
Source	Rating
Allmusic	4/5 stars

== Track listing ==
All songs Traditional.

1. "Georgie" – 0:54
2. "Fish in the Mill Pond" – 1:39
3. "Julie Jenkins" – 0:42
4. "Hushabye" – 0:16
5. "Baa Nanny Black Sheep" – 0:56
6. "Sheepy and the Goat" – 0:23
7. "I Heard My Mother Weeping" – 3:02
8. "Reuben's Train" – 2:40
9. "Biscuits" – 3:14
10. "Tucker's Barn" – 2:23
11. "Give the Fiddler a Dram" – 1:52
12. "And Am I Born to Die?" – 3:29
13. "Marthy, Won't You Have Some Good Old Cider?" – 2:06
14. "A-Roving on a Winter's Night" – 1:51
15. "Arnold's Tune" – 0:46
16. "Pretty Saro" – 2:12
17. "Early, Early in the Spring" – 2:04
18. "Little Maggie" – 2:36
19. "Bill Banks" – 2:30
20. "Rambling Hobo" – 1:02
21. "One Morning in May" – 1:58
22. "The Faithful Soldier" – 3:29
23. "Omie Wise" – 2:43
24. "Jimmy Sutton" – 1:12

== Personnel ==
- Doc Watson – vocals, guitar, banjo
- Merle Watson – guitar
- Gaither Carlton – banjo, fiddle, vocals
- Dolly Greer – vocals
- Annie Watson – vocals
- Arnold Watson – banjo, vocals
- Tina Greer — vocals
- Rosa Lee Watson – vocals

Production notes

- Ralph Rinzler – producer, engineer, editing, liner notes
- A.L. Lloyd – liner notes
