= Songs from the Southern Mountains =

Studio album by Doc Watson, The Doc Watson Family
- Released: 1994
- Genre: Folk
- Length: 40:10
- Label: Sugar Hill

Doc Watson chronology
Remembering Merle (1992)	Songs from the Southern Mountains (1994)	Original Folkways Recordings: 1960–1962 (1994)

Songs from the Southern Mountains (subtitled The Doc Watson Family) is the title of a recording by American folk music artist Doc Watson and Family, released in 1994. The music is taken from recordings by Eugene Earle and D. K. Wilgus. It contains previously unreleased material from the early 1960s as well as three tracks recorded in 1973. The liner notes are by Watson's daughter Nancy, recalling memories of grandpa Gaither Carlton, the first Watson Family recording session, and the April night that Merle Watson began playing guitar.

== Reception ==
Professional ratings
Review scores
Source	Rating
Allmusic	3/5 stars

Writing for Allmusic, music critic Jim Smith wrote the album "has a scattershot feeling about it that comes from the material being recorded at different times, but it digs up some good stuff along the way. Particularly nice are Watson's performances of Blind Boy Fuller's "My Little Woman, You're So Sweet" and "Just a Friend," in which he duets with mother Rosa Lee."

== Track listing ==
All songs Traditional unless otherwise noted.

1. "Rye Cove" (A. P. Carter) – 2:20 (from the Ash Grove, Los Angeles, CA, 1962)
2. "Twilight Is Stealing" – 2:24 (from Deep Gap, NC, 1962)
3. "Fisher's Hornpipe" – 1:01 (from the Ash Grove, Los Angeles, CA, 1964)
4. "Anniversary Blue Yodel [Blue Yodel No. 7]" (Jimmie Rodgers) – 2:07 (from the Ash Grove, Los Angeles, CA, 1964)
5. "A Tiny Broken Heart" (Charlie Louvin, Ira Louvin) – 3:01 (from Deep Gap, NC, 1973)
6. "Honey Babe Blues" – 2:25 (from the Ash Grove, Los Angeles, CA, 1964)
7. "Brown's Dream" – 1:45 (from Newport Folk Festival, Newport, RI, July 1964)
8. "When The Roll Is Called Up Yonder" (James Milton Black) – 3:16 (from UCLA, Los Angeles, CA, 1964)
9. "My Little Woman, You're So Sweet" – 2:18 (from the Ash Grove, Los Angeles, CA, 1964)
10. "Will My Mother Know Me There?" – 3:30 (from Deep Gap, NC, 1962)
11. "Go Shoot Old Davey Dugger" – 1:31 (from the Ash Grove, Los Angeles, CA, 1964)
12. "My Wandering Boy" – 3:06 (from Deep Gap, NC, 1973)
13. "Somebody Touched Me" – 2:10 (from UCLA, Los Angeles, CA, 1964)
14. "Grandfather's Clock" (Henry Clay Work)– 2:55 (from the Ash Grove, Los Angeles, CA, 1964)
15. "Lonely Tombs" – 3:01 (from Deep Gap, NC, 1962)
16. "Just a Friend" (Jack Anglin, Johnnie Wright) – 3:20 (from Deep Gap, NC, 1973)

== Personnel ==
- Doc Watson – guitar(1,2,3,4,6,8,10,11,13,14,15), lead guitar(5,12,16), 12 string guitar(9), lead vocal(1,2,4,5,6,8,9,13,14,15), bass vocal(10), harmony vocal(12,16), harmonica(3), banjo(7)
- Gaither Carlton – fiddle(7,8,11,13,15)
- Arnold Watson – banjo(6,8,13,15), bass vocal(2,8,13,15), lead vocal(10)
- Mrs. General Dixon Watson – alto vocal(2,10)
- Rosa Lee Watson – guitar(5,12,16), lead vocal(12,16), harmony vocal(5)
- Almeda Riddle – alto vocal(8,13)
- Merle Watson - guitar(7)
