= The Best of Doc Watson: 1964–1968 =

The Best of Doc Watson: 1964-1968

Greatest hits album by Doc Watson
- Released: April 20, 1999
- Genres: Folk, blues
- Length: 1:04:18
- Label: Vanguard

Doc Watson chronology
Third Generation Blues (1999)	The Best of Doc Watson: 1964-1968 (1999)	Foundation (2000)

The Best of Doc Watson: 1964–1968 is the title of a recording by American folk music and country blues artist Doc Watson, released in 1999. It contains tracks from Watson's early years on the Vanguard label plus four previously unreleased tracks.

Professional ratings
Review scores
Source	Rating
Allmusic	4.5/5 stars

== Track listing ==
No.	Title	Writer(s)	Length
1.	"Muskrat"	Merle Travis; Sydna "Tex Ann" Nation; Harold Hensley	2:49
2.	"Country Blues"	Dock Boggs	3:28
3.	"Rising Sun Blues"	Traditional	4:13
4.	"Tennessee Stud"	Jimmy Driftwood	3:34
5.	"Down in the Valley to Pray"	Traditional	1:59
6.	"Dill Pickle Rag"	Charles L. Johnson	1:21
7.	"Otto Wood the Bandit"	Walter "Kid" Smith	3:12
8.	"Windy and Warm"	John D. Loudermilk	2:11
9.	"Little Sadie"	Traditional	1:56
10.	"Blue Railroad Train"	Alton Delmore; Rabon Delmore	2:41
11.	"Omie Wise"	Traditional	4:24
12.	"Intoxicated Rat"	Dorsey M. Dixon; Wade Mainer	2:28
13.	"Tom Dooley"	Traditional	3:13
14.	"Alberta"	Huddie Ledbetter	2:40
15.	"Beaumont Rag"	Traditional	1:36
16.	"Shady Grove"	Traditional	2:55
17.	"My Rough and Rowdy Ways"	Elsie McWilliams; Jimmie Rodgers	2:28
18.	"The Train That Carried My Girl from Town"	Traditional	3:43
19.	"Black Mountain Rag"	Leslie Keith	1:43

Previously unreleased tracks
No.	Title	Writer(s)	Length
20.	"Grandfather's Clock"	Henry Clay Work	3:19
21.	"The Cyclone of Rye Cove"	Maybelle Carter; Sara Carter; A. P. Carter	3:10
22.	"Doc's Guitar"	Doc Watson	1:23
23.	"Crawdad Hole"	Traditional	3:52
Total length:			1:04:18

== Personnel ==
- Doc Watson – guitar, harmonica, vocals
- Merle Watson – guitar, banjo
