= My Dear Old Southern Home =

Studio album by Doc Watson
- Released: 1991
- Recorded: The Sound Shop, Nashville, TN
- Genre: Folk
- Length: 42:27
- Label: Sugar Hill
- Producer: T. Michael Coleman

Doc Watson chronology
Songs for Little Pickers (1990)	My Dear Old Southern Home (1991)	Remembering Merle (1992)

My Dear Old Southern Home is the title of a recording by American folk music artist Doc Watson, released in 1991.

== Reception ==
Professional ratings
Review scores
Source	Rating
Allmusic	3/5 stars

Writing for Allmusic, music critic Thom Owens wrote of the album "For some fans, My Dear Old Southern Home will seem like it lacks Watson's signature guitar work, but it's a wonderful, warm listen"

== Track listing ==
1. "My Dear Old Southern Home" (Ellsworth Cozzens, Jimmie Rodgers) – 2:22
2. "The Ship That Never Returned" (Henry Clay Work) – 3:15
3. "Your Long Journey" (Watson, Watson) – 2:45
4. "My Friend Jim" (Traditional) – 3:29
5. "No Telephone in Heaven" (A. P. Carter) – 4:33
6. "Dream of the Miner's Child" (Andrew Jenkins) – 2:51
7. "Wreck of the Old Number Nine" (Carson Robison) – 2:51
8. "Grandfather's Clock" (Henry Clay Work) – 3:50
9. "Don't Say Goodbye If You Love Me" (Jimmie Davis, Bonnie Dodd) – 3:44
10. "Sleep, Baby, Sleep" (Jimmie Rodgers) – 2:53
11. "Signal Light" (Davis, Neal, Watson) – 2:48
12. "That Silver Haired Daddy of Mine" (Gene Autry, Jimmie Long) – 4:20
13. "Life Is Like a River" (Watson) – 2:46

== Personnel ==
- Doc Watson – guitar, autoharp, harmonica, vocals
- Jack Lawrence – guitar
- Sam Bush – mandolin
- T. Michael Coleman – bass
- Stuart Duncan – fiddle, mandolin
- Roy M. "Junior" Huskey – bass
- Alan O'Bryant – harmony vocals
- Mark Schatz – bass
- Jerry Douglas - dobro

Production notes

- Produced by T. Michael Coleman
- Engineered by Bil VornDick
