= Doc Watson in Nashville: Good Deal! =

Studio album by Doc Watson
- Released: 1968
- Recorded: Nashville, TN
- Genre: Folk, country blues
- Length: 38:06
- Label: Vanguard
- Producer: Jack Lothrop

Doc Watson chronology
Old-Timey Concert (1967)	Doc Watson in Nashville: Good Deal! (1968)	Doc Watson on Stage (1971)

Doc Watson in Nashville: Good Deal! is the title of a recording by American folk music artist Doc Watson, released in 1968.

With the folk music boom on the wane, Watson traveled to Nashville. The result is a more polished sound with members of The Nashville A-Team backing him up.

== Reception ==
Professional ratings
Review scores
Source	Rating
Allmusic	3/5 stars

Writing for Allmusic, music critic Bruce Eder wrote the album "The playing is more impressive than the arrangements, which have that trademark Nashville smoothness..."

== Track listing ==
1. "Alabama Jubilee" (George Cobb, Jack Yellen) – 2:12
2. "Streamline Cannonball" (Roy Acuff) – 2:28
3. "Peach Pickin' Time in Georgia" (Jimmie Rodgers) – 2:59
4. "June Apple" (Traditional) – 2:12
5. "I'm Thinking of My Blue Eyes" (A. P. Carter) – 3:28
6. "Memphis Blues" (W. C. Handy, George Norton) – 2:45
7. "The Train That Carried My Girl from Town" (Traditional) – 3:47
8. "Old Camp Meeting Time" (Traditional) – 2:50
9. "Bye Bye Blues" (Dave Bennett, Chauncy Gray, Fred Hamm, Bert Lown) – 2:44
10. "Shady Grove" (Traditional) – 2:59
11. "Blackberry Rag" (Watson) – 2:40
12. "The Girl in the Blue Velvet Band" (Cliff Carlisle, Mel Foree) – 3:24
13. "Rainbow" (Traditional) – 2:34
14. "Step It Up and Go" (Blind Boy Fuller) – 1:55

== Personnel ==
- Doc Watson – 6 & 12 string guitars, banjo, vocals
- Merle Watson – guitar
- Junior Huskey – bass
- Floyd Cramer – piano
- Buddy Harman – drums
- Shot Jackson – dobro
- Grady Martin – guitar, Spanish dobro
- Buddy Spicher – fiddle
- Tommy Jackson - fiddle
- Don Stover – banjo

Production notes

- Jack Lothrop – producer
- Jules Halfant – art direction
- Joel Brodsky – photography
