= Portrait (Doc Watson album) =

Studio album by Doc Watson
- Released: 1987
- Recorded: Nashville Sound Connection, Nashville, TN
- Genre: Folk, country blues
- Length: 39:31
- Label: Sugar Hill
- Producer: T. Michael Coleman, Doc Watson

Doc Watson chronology
Riding the Midnight Train (1986)	Portrait (1987)	On Praying Ground (1990)

Portrait is the title of a recording by American folk music artist Doc Watson, released in 1987.

Guests include Jerry Douglas, Sam Bush and Mark O'Connor.

Professional ratings
Review scores
Source	Rating
Allmusic	3/5 stars

== Track listing ==
1. "I'm Worried Now" – 2:13
2. "Nobody Knows But Me" (Elsie McWilliams, Jimmie Rodgers) – 3:40
3. "Leaving London" (Tom Paxton) – 3:48
4. "Stay in the Middle of the Road" (Traditional) – 2:33
5. "Risin' Sun Blues" (Traditional) – 4:11
6. "George Gudger's Overalls" (Lawrence Hammond) – 3:20
7. "Tucker's Barn" (Traditional) – 2:08
8. "Storms on the Ocean" (A. P. Carter) – 3:31
9. "Prayer Bells of Heaven" (Traditional) – 2:25
10. "Tough Luck Man" (Clarence Ashley) – 2:45
11. "She's Gone Away" (William Smith) – 2:43
12. "Country Blues" (Dock Boggs) – 3:24
13. "Blue Eyed Jane" (Jimmie Rodgers, Lulu Belle White) – 3:00

== Personnel ==
- Doc Watson – guitar, 12-string guitar, banjo, harmonica, autoharp, vocals
- T. Michael Coleman – bass, harmony vocals
- Sam Bush – fiddle, mandolin
- Mark O'Connor – fiddle
- Jerry Douglas – dobro
- Alan O'Bryant – guitar, harmony vocals
- Pat McInerney – percussion
- Mike Compton – harmony vocals
- Pat Enright – harmony vocals
- Mark Hembree – harmony vocals
- Jack Lawrence – guitar

Production notes

- Produced by T. Michael Coleman and Doc Watson
- Engineered by Bill Vorn Dick
- Mastered by James Lloyd
