= Original Folkways Recordings: 1960–1962 =

Compilation album by Doc Watson, Clarence Ashley
- Released: 1994
- Recorded: 1960–1962
- Genre: Folk, blues
- Length: 123:36
- Label: Smithsonian Folkways
- Producer: Ralph Rinzler

Doc Watson chronology
Songs from the Southern Mountains (1994)	Original Folkways Recordings: 1960–1962 (1994)	Docabilly (1994)

Original Folkways Recordings: 1960–1962 is the title of a recording by Doc Watson and Clarence Ashley, released in 1994.

== History ==
Banjoist and comedian Ashley and guitarist, singer Watson were recorded both in the studio and field recordings in the early 1960s. In the folk music revival of the late 1950s and early 1960s, urban ethnomusicologists rediscovered Ashley's music. In 1960 Ralph Rinzler met Ashley at the Old Time Fiddler's Convention and persuaded him to start playing banjo again and to record his repertoire of songs. Over the next few years he and his friends, including Doc Watson, played at many urban folk festivals. They also made two records for Folkways Records Old Time Music at Clarence Ashley's, Vol. 1 and Old Time Music at Clarence Ashley's, Vol. 2.

At the time of the earliest recordings, Watson did not even own an acoustic guitar and was playing electric guitar in a local rockabilly band. Ashley himself did not even own a banjo and hadn't played for 20 years. This reissue includes material from those albums along with 20 additional selections. These recordings feature the very first commercially released recordings by Watson.

== Reception ==
Professional ratings
Review scores
Source	Rating
Allmusic	4/5 stars

Writing for Allmusic, music critic Burgin Mathews wrote of the album "... the set is required listening for Watson fans and for enthusiasts of old-time music, its entertainment value as strong as its historical significance. The surprising offspring of the urban revival's intersection with a traditional musical community, Watson and Ashley's Original Folkways Recordings reveals a bottomless well of tradition and a music as fresh and exciting today as it was to the college kids and festival followers of the early '60s."

== Track listing ==
All songs Traditional unless otherwise noted.

1. "Crawdad Song" – 3:33
2. "Sitting on Top of the World" (Sam Chatmon, Walter Vinson) – 3:05 (*)
3. "Lee Highway Blues" – 1:41
4. "Free Little Bird" – 2:06
5. "The Cuckoo" – 2:33
6. "Rising Sun Blues" – 2:56
7. "Looking T'Ward Heaven" (Luther G. Presley) – 2:27 (*)
8. "Rambling Hobo" – 1:27 (*)
9. "Rambling Hobo" – 1:36 (*)
10. "Shady Grove" – 1:28
11. "Cumberland Gap" – 2:18 (*)
12. "Tough Luck" – 2:26
13. "Humpbacked Mule" – 1:26
14. "My Home's Across the Blue Ridge Mountains" (Clarence Ashley, Tom Ashley, A.P. Carter) – 2:47
15. "Way Downtown" – 2:29
16. "Banks of the Ohio" – 4:11 (*)
17. "Little Sadie" – 2:19
18. "Carroll County Blues" – 1:39 (*)
19. "Cluck Old Hen" – 1:45 (*)
20. "Chilly Winds (Lonesome Road Blues)" – 2:37 (*)
21. "Sweet Heaven When I Die" – 2:37 (*)
22. "Fire on the Mountain" – 1:22 (*)
23. "Will the Circle Be Unbroken" – 3:20 (*)
24. "Daniel Prayed" (G.T. Speer) – 2:54
25. "Amazing Grace" (John Newton) – 3:56
26. "Sally Ann" – 2:31
27. "Richmond Blues" (Clarence Ashley) – 1:33
28. "Old Ruben" – 2:00
29. "Willie Moore" – 3:31 (*)
30. "Walking Boss" – 1:49
31. "Shout Lulu" – 1:23 (*)
32. "Skillet Good and Greasy" – 2:05
33. "Pretty Little Pink" – 2:26
34. "Run, Jimmie, Run" – 3:05 (*)
35. "Hicks' Farewell" – 5:22
36. "The Old Man at the Mill" – 1:54
37. "A Short Life of Trouble" – 3:18 (*)
38. "Brown's Dream" – 1:41 (*)
39. "Footprints in the Snow" – 2:42
40. "I'm Going Back to Jericho" – 1:51
41. "Peg and Awl" – 2:11
42. "Maggie Walker Blues" – 2:53
43. "God's Gonna Ease My Troublin' Mind" – 3:03
44. "I Saw a Man at the Close of Day" (G.B. Grayson, Henry Whitter) – 2:37 (*)
45. "Handsome Molly" – 2:13
46. "John Henry" – 3:42 (*)
47. "Honey Babe Blues" – 3:43
48. "Wayfaring Pilgrim" – 5:05 (*)

(*) denotes songs not found on the Old Time Music at Clarence Ashley's recordings.

== Personnel ==
- Doc Watson – guitar, banjo, harmonica, vocals
- Clarence Ashley – banjo
- Gaither Carlton – fiddle
- Clint Howard – vocals
- Fred Price – fiddle, vocals
