= Foundation (Doc Watson album) =

Foundation: Doc Watson Guitar Instrumental Collection, 1964-1998

Compilation album by Doc Watson
- Released: July 25, 2000
- Genre: Folk, blues
- Label: Sugar Hill
- Producer: Jim Mills (compilation)

Doc Watson chronology
The Best of Doc Watson: 1964–1968 (1999)	Foundation: Doc Watson Guitar Instrumental Collection, 1964-1998 (2000)	Doc Watson at Gerdes Folk City (2001)

Foundation: Doc Watson Guitar Instrumental Collection, 1964-1998 (or simply Foundation) is the title of a recording by American folk music and country blues artist Doc Watson, released in 2000. It contains instrumental tracks from Watson's 1964 to 1998 recordings.

Professional ratings
Review scores
Source	Rating
Allmusic	4/5 stars

== Track listing ==
1. "Black Mountain Rag" (Traditional) – 1:31
2. "Windy & Warm" (John D. Loudermilk) – 2:15
3. "June Apple" (Traditional) – 2:11
4. "Doc's Guitar" (Watson) – 1:30
5. "Stone's Rag" (Traditional) – 2:40
6. "Victory Rag" (Maybelle Carter) – 1:45
7. "Nashville Pickin'" (John Pilla, Doc Watson) – 1:53
8. "Medley: Fiddler's Dream/Whistling Rufus/Ragtime Annie (Raggedy Ann)" (Traditional) – 2:11
9. "Billy in the Low Ground" (Traditional) – 1:47
10. "Rainbow" (Traditional) – 2:33
11. "Dill Pickle Rag" (Traditional) – 1:25
12. "Salt River/Bill Cheatham" (Traditional) – 2:28
13. "Lonesome Banjo" (Watson) – 1:43
14. "Texas Gales" (Molly O' Day) – 1:31
15. "Tucker's Barn" (Traditional) – 2:18
16. "Cannonball Rag" (Merle Travis) – 2:03

== Personnel ==
- Doc Watson – guitar, harmonica, vocals
- Merle Watson – guitar, banjo

Production notes: Re-issue

- Jim Mills – compilation producer
- Dan Crary – liner notes
- David Glasser – mastering
- Will McIntyre – photography
- Sue Meyer – design
- D. Kent Thompson – photography
