= Del Doc & Mac =

Studio album by Doc Watson, Del McCoury, Mac Wiseman
- Released: October 20, 1998
- Genres: Folk, bluegrass
- Length: 37:19
- Label: Sugar Hill
- Producer: Scott Rouse

Doc Watson chronology
Doc & Dawg (1997)	Del Doc & Mac (1998)	Third Generation Blues (1999)

Del Doc & Mac (the cover actually prints the names and photos in a somewhat convoluted manner, hence most discographies use the alphabetical listing) is the title of a recording by American folk music artists Doc Watson, Del McCoury and Mac Wiseman, released in 1998.

== History ==
All three artists are well-known bluegrass musicians. Watson's long career in folk, blues and bluegrass has earned him numerous awards, amongst them seven Grammy Awards as well as a Lifetime Achievement Award. McCoury's Del McCoury Band is a Grammy Award-winning bluegrass band. Wiseman has been inducted into the International Bluegrass Music Hall of Honor and the Country Music Hall of Fame (2014).

Guests on Del Doc & Mac include Jerry Douglas on dobro and Alison Krauss on harmony vocals.

== Reception ==
Professional ratings
Review scores
Source	Rating
Allmusic	4/5 stars
Acoustic & Folk Music Exchange	(favorable)

Writing for Allmusic, music critic Jana Pendragon wrote of the album "... this is a treasure created by three of very recognizable voices from the world of bluegrass music. And these Groovegrass Boyz never sounded better!... Emotionally satisfying, this is a special project within the scope of traditional American music." Allen Price highly praised the album, calling it "carved out a little piece of musical heaven."

== Track listing ==
1. "Little Green Valley" (Carson Robison) – 3:09
2. "The Old Account" (Frank Graham) – 3:00
3. "Speak To Me Little Darlin'" (Leslie York) – 1:40
4. "New Moon Over My Shoulder" (Lee Blastic, Jimmie Davis, Ekko Whelan) – 3:46
5. "Beauty Of My Dreams" (Del McCoury) – 2:24
6. "I'll Sail My Ship Alone" (Henry Bernard, Morry Burns, Sydney Herman, Henry Thurston) – 2:12
7. "When A Soldier Knocks" (Moon Mullican, Ernest Tubb, Lou Wayne) – 2:34
8. "Live And Let Live" (Gene Sullivan) – 3:13
9. "I've Endured" (Ola Belle Reed) – 2:22
10. "Talk Of The Town" (Don Reno) – 2:26
11. "Black Mountain Rag" (Traditional) – 2:55
12. "I Wonder Where You Are Tonight" (Johnny Bond) – 3:27
13. "More Pretty Girls Than One" (Arthur Smith) – 4:11

== Personnel ==
- Doc Watson, Del McCoury, and Mac Wiseman – guitars and vocals
- Jack Lawrence – guitar
- Mike Bub – bass
- Jason Carter – fiddle
- Jerry Douglas – dobro
- Rob McCoury – banjo
- Byron House – bass
- Terry Eldridge – guitar
- Alison Krauss – harmony vocals
- Ronnie McCoury – mandolin, harmony vocals
- Gene Wooten – dobro

Production notes

- Scott Rouse – producer
- Gary Paczosa – engineer
- Les Wax – mixing
- Denny Purcell – mastering
- Scott Rouse – design
- Bishop James Morton – photography
- Thud Rippington – executive producer
- Ed Rode – photography, cover art concept

"Scott Rouse - cover art concept
