= Remembering Merle =

Live album by Doc Watson, Merle Watson
- Released: June 1992
- Recorded: 1970–1976
- Genre: Folk, gospel
- Length: 58:28
- Label: Sugar Hill
- Producer: T. Michael Coleman

Doc Watson chronology
My Dear Old Southern Home (1991)	Remembering Merle (1992)	Songs from the Southern Mountains (1994)

Remembering Merle is the title of a recording by American folk music artists Doc Watson and Merle Watson, released in 1992. The songs were all recorded live between 1970 and 1976.

Professional ratings
Review scores
Source	Rating
Allmusic	4.5/5 stars

== Track listing ==
1. "Frosty Morn" (Traditional) – 3:44
2. "Omie Wise" (Traditional) – 5:52
3. "Frankie and Johnny" (Traditional) – 3:23
4. "Honey Babe Blues" (Traditional) – 3:01
5. "St. James Infirmary" (Joe Primrose, Traditional) – 3:52
6. "Honey Please Don't Go" (Hodges) – 2:30
7. "Nancy Rowland/Salt Creek" – 1:55
8. "Miss the Mississippi and You" (Halley) – 4:20
9. "Nine Pound Hammer" (Merle Travis) – 2:46
10. "Summertime" (George Gershwin, Ira Gershwin, DuBose Heyward) – 3:30
11. "New River Train" (Traditional) – 3:38
12. "Black Mountain Rag" (Traditional) – 2:39
13. "Southern Lady Hill" – 3:36
14. "Mama Don't Allow It" (Cahn, Davenport) – 5:02
15. "Blue Suede Shoes" (Carl Perkins) – 2:35
16. "Wayfaring Stranger" – 3:30
17. "Thoughts of Never" (Watson) – 2:35

== Personnel ==
- Doc Watson – guitar, vocals
- Merle Watson – guitar, banjo, slide guitar, vocals
- T. Michael Coleman – bass, harmony vocals
- Joe Smothers – guitar, harmony vocals
- Bob Hill – piano, guitar, harmony vocals
- Charles Cochran – piano

Production notes

- Produced by T. Michael Coleman
