= Songs from Home (Doc Watson and Merle Watson album) =

Compilation album by Doc Watson, Merle Watson
- Released: October 22, 2002
- Genre: Folk, blues
- Length: 49:00
- Label: Capitol

Doc Watson chronology
Doc Watson at Gerdes Folk City (2001)	Songs from Home (2002)	Round the Table Again (2002)

Songs from Home is the title of a recording by the American folk music and country blues artists Doc Watson and Merle Watson, released in 2002. It contains tracks from Watson's years on the Poppy and United Artists labels plus four previously unreleased tracks.

At the Grammy Awards of 1980 "Big Sandy/Leather Britches" won the Grammy Award for Best Country Instrumental Performance.

Professional ratings
Review scores
Source	Rating
Allmusic	4/5 stars

== Track listing ==
1. "My Creole Belle" (Mississippi John Hurt, Watson) – 2:42
2. "T for Texas (Blue Yodel No. 1)" (Jimmie Rodgers) – 3:48
3. "Big Sandy/Leather Britches" (Traditional) – 1:51
4. "Shady Grove" (Traditional) – 2:40
5. "Match Box Blues" (Blind Lemon Jefferson) – 3:32
6. "Rambling Hobo" (Doc Watson) – 1:51
7. "Southbound Passenger Train" (Traditional) – 2:24
8. "Little Beggar Man/Old Joe Clark" (Traditional) – 2:10
9. "Wild Bill Jones" (Traditional) – 2:53
10. "Bonaparte's Retreat" (Pee Wee King, Redd Stewart) – 2:03
11. "Wake Up, Little Maggie" (Gaither Carlton, Doc Watson) – 2:53
12. "Double File and Salt Creek" (Traditional) – 1:41
13. "Daybreak Blues" (Jimmie Rodgers) – 4:00
14. "Peartree" (Gaither Carlton, Doc Watson) – 2:21
15. "My Rose of Old Kentucky" (Bill Monroe) – 2:39
16. "St. James Hospital/Frosty Morn" (Traditional) – 6:29
17. "Freight Train Boogie" (Watson) – 3:00

== Personnel ==
- Doc Watson – guitar, harmonica, vocals
- Merle Watson – guitar, banjo
