= On Praying Ground =

Studio album by Doc Watson
- Released: 1990
- Studios: The Sound Shop, Nashville, Tennessee
- Genres: Folk, gospel
- Length: 37:17
- Label: Sugar Hill
- Producer: T. Michael Coleman

Doc Watson chronology
Portrait (1987)	On Praying Ground (1990)	Songs for Little Pickers (1990)

On Praying Ground is an album by the American musician Doc Watson, released in 1990. It is a collection of gospel songs. The version of "I'm Gonna Lay My Burdens Down" was inspired by Mississippi John Hurt's arrangement.

At the Grammy Awards of 1991, On Praying Ground won the Grammy Award for Best Traditional Folk Album.

Professional ratings
Review scores
Source	Rating
AllMusic	3/5 stars

== Track listing ==
1. "You Must Come in at the Door" (Sunny Skylar, Doc Watson) – 2:15
2. "Precious Lord" (Daniels, Jones) – 3:30
3. "On Praying Ground" (Traditional) – 2:25
4. "I'll Live On" (T.J. Laney) – 2:34
5. "Gathering Buds" (James Rowe, James Vaughan) – 2:56
6. "Beautiful Golden Somewhere" (L. H. Parthemore) – 3:14
7. "I'm Gonna Lay My Burdens Down" (Traditional) – 3:38
8. "We'll Work 'Til Jesus Comes" (William Miller, Elizabeth Mills) – 2:43
9. "The Ninety & Nine" (Elizabeth Clephane, Ira Sankey) – 2:31
10. "Farther Along" (Rev. W. B. Stevens) – 4:15
11. "Christmas Lullaby" (Traditional) – 2:04
12. "Did Christ O'Er Sinners Weep" (Benjamin Beddome) – 2:12
13. "Uncloudy Day" (Josiah K. Alwood) – 3:00

== Personnel ==
- Doc Watson – guitar, banjo, harmonica, vocals
- T. Michael Coleman – bass, harmony vocals
- Sam Bush – mandolin
- Jerry Douglas – dobro
- Alan O'Bryant – guitar, harmony vocals
- Jack Lawrence – guitar
- Roland White – guitar, harmony vocals
- Stuart Duncan – fiddle, mandolin, guitar, harmony vocals
- Roy "Junior" Huskey – bass

Production

- Produced by T. Michael Coleman
- Engineered by Bill Vorn Dick
- Mastered by James Lloyd
- Photography by Will & Deni McIntyre
