= Down South (album) =

Studio album by Doc Watson, Merle Watson
- Released: 1984
- Recorded: North Star Production, Todd, North Carolina
- Genre: Folk, country blues
- Length: 31:53
- Label: Sugar Hill
- Producer: Merle Watson

Doc Watson chronology
Doc and Merle Watson's Guitar Album (1983)	Down South (1984)	Pickin' the Blues (1985)

Professional ratings
Review scores
Source	Rating
AllMusic	3/5 stars

Down South is a recording by American folk music artists Doc Watson and Merle Watson, released in 1984. It has been reissued on CD by Rykodisc and Sugar Hill.

== Track listing ==
All songs Traditional unless otherwise noted.

1. "Solid Gone" – 3:02
2. "Bright Sunny South" – 2:36
3. "Slidin' Delta" (Mississippi John Hurt) – 2:03
4. "Coal Miner's Blues" (Carter) – 2:30
5. "Hesitation Blues" – 2:46
6. "What a Friend We Have in Jesus" (Charles C. Converse, Joseph M. Scriven) – 3:35
7. "Fifteen Cents" – 2:28
8. "Twin Sisters" – 1:39
9. "The Hobo" – 4:18
10. "Cotton-Eyed Joe" – 1:48
11. "Hello Stranger" (Carter) – 2:17
12. "Down South" – 2:35

== Personnel ==
- Doc Watson – guitar, harmonica, vocals
- Merle Watson – guitar, banjo, slide guitar
- T. Michael Coleman – bass, harmony vocals
- Buddy Davis – bass
- Sam Bush – fiddle

Production notes

- Produced by Merle Watson
- Engineered and mixed by Carl Rudisill
