= Doc Watson & Son =

Studio album by Doc Watson, Merle Watson
- Released: 1965
- Genre: Folk, blues
- Label: Vanguard (VAND 79170)
- Producer: Ralph Rinzler

Doc Watson chronology
Doc Watson (1964)	Doc Watson & Son (1965)	Southbound (1966)

Doc Watson & Son is the self-titled début album by Doc Watson and Merle Watson, released in 1965.

== Reception ==
Professional ratings
Review scores
Source	Rating
Allmusic	4/5 stars

Allmusic critic Jim Smith wrote that the album "shows the duo's musical partnership already in full flower."

== Track listing ==
1. "Muskrat" (Traditional) – 2:54
2. "Weary Blues" (Traditional) – 2:43
3. "Medley: Fiddler's Dram/Whistling Rufus/Ragtime Annie (Raggedy Ann)" (Traditional) – 2:13
4. "Dream of the Miner's Child" (Traditional) – 2:48
5. "Rising Sun Blues" (Clarence Ashley) – 4:19
6. "Mama Blues" (Doc Watson) – 2:20
7. "We Shall All Be Reunited" (Robert Bateman) – 2:14
8. "Little Stream of Whiskey" (Traditional) – 2:28
9. "Little Sadie" (Traditional) – 2:01
10. "Beaumont Rag" (Traditional) – 1:41
11. "Otto Wood the Bandit" (Walter "The Kid" Smith) – 3:18
12. "Faithful Soldier" (Traditional) – 3:12
13. "Memphis Blues" (John Miller) – 1:36
14. "Gonna Lay Down My Old Guitar" (Alton Delmore, Rabon Delmore) – 2:08

== Personnel ==
- Doc Watson – 6 & 12 string-guitar, harmonica, vocals
- Merle Watson – guitar

Production notes

- Produced by Ralph Rinzler
- Cover photo by David Gahr
- Design by Jules Halfant
