= Round the Table Again =

'Round the Table Again

Live album by Doc Watson and Frosty Morn
- Released: April 2, 2002
- Recorded: February 2–3, 2001
- Genre: Folk, blues
- Label: Sugar Hill
- Producer: T. Michael Coleman, Claire Armbruster

Doc Watson chronology
Songs from Home (2002)	'Round the Table Again (2002)	Legacy (2002)

'Round the Table Again is the title of a recording by American folk music and country blues artist Doc Watson and Frosty Morn, released in 2002. The group, Frosty Morn, was formed by Watson's son Merle shortly before his death in 1985.

Professional ratings
Review scores
Source	Rating
Allmusic	3/5 stars

== Track listing ==
1. "Lynchburg Town" (Traditional) – 4:38
2. "Coo Coo Bird" (Clarence Ashley) – 2:48
3. "Blues Walkin' Round My Bed" (Watson, Watson) – 4:35
4. "She's So Sweet" (Blind Boy Fuller) – 4:12
5. "On a Monday" (Lead Belly) – 3:11
6. "Working Man Blues" (Merle Haggard) – 5:27
7. "Jimmie's Mean Mamma Blues" (Waldo O'Neal, Jimmie Rodgers, Bob Sawyer) – 3:39
8. "Walking in Jerusalem" (Traditional) – 2:49
9. "Show Bizness" (Lamar Hill, Fred Koller) – 4:23
10. "Sincerely" (Alan Freed, Harvey Fuqua) – 3:18
11. "Battle of Nashville" (Iamar Hill) – 4:23
12. "You Ain't Going Nowhere" (Bob Dylan) – 5:32
13. "C. C. Rider" (Mississippi John Hurt) – 4:07
14. "Court on High" (T. Michael Coleman, Joe Smothers) – 3:09
15. "Nights in White Satin" (Justin Hayward) – 3:29
16. "Sugar Babe" (Mance Lipscomb) – 3:50

== Personnel ==
- Doc Watson – guitar, banjo, vocals
- T. Michael Coleman – bass, harmony vocals
- Joe Smothers – guitar, harmony vocals
- Richard Watson – guitar

Production notes: Re-issue

- Produced by T. Michael Coleman and Claire Armbruster
- Engineer, editing, remixing by Bill Wolf
