= Doc & Dawg =

Studio album by Doc Watson, David Grisman
- Released: August 19, 1997
- Recorded: Jul 1987–May 1991 at Bayview Studios, Jul 1987 and Dawg Studios, Oct 1990 and May 1991
- Genre: Folk, bluegrass
- Length: 46:24
- Label: Acoustic Disc
- Producer: David Grisman

Doc Watson chronology
Watson Country (1996)	Doc & Dawg (1997)	Del Doc & Mac (1998)

David Grisman chronology
Breakdown (1997)	Doc & Dawg (1997)	Muleskinner Live: Original Television Soundtrack (1998)

Doc & Dawg is a 1997 recording by the American folk music artist Doc Watson and mandolinist David Grisman.

== History ==
Doc Watson and David Grisman first met in the early 1960s when Watson was playing at Gerde's Folk City in New York. Grisman, only 17 years old, was invited on stage by Watson to join him on mandolin for a rendition of “In the Pines”.

Mostly recorded at Grisman's home over a period of years, the recordings are informal and pulled from numerous recording sessions. In the liner notes, Grisman described the sessions: "These tapes document some wonderful 'after-dinner' sessions at my home during several of Doc's visits. Tunes were selected spontaneously and more often than not, played only once. We're pleased to share some of these moments."

== Reception ==
Professional ratings
Review scores
Source	Rating
Allmusic	4/5 stars
No Depression	(no rating)

Writing for Allmusic, the music critic S. Colby Miller wrote of the album, "The tracks are mainly traditional country and bluegrass tunes played lovingly and often with great restraint... This is an intimate collaboration between two men at the top of their craft who share a passion for acoustic music. It is a pleasure to listen in."

Stephen Hatfield of No Depression wrote, "Beyond the song selection and quality picking, the true source of bliss in this music is the level of familiarity and comfort it exudes. Listening to the music, one can almost imagine the two of them trading licks and guffaws right there on the front porch. Watson’s warm voice and conversational tone only add to the intimacy"

== Track listing ==
1. "Doc & Dawg" (David Grisman) – 2:00
2. "All About You" (Cliff Friend) – 3:38
3. "Bluegrass Stomp" (Bill Monroe) – 4:56
4. "Summertime" (George Gershwin, Ira Gershwin, DuBose Heyward) – 4:20
5. "Sweet Georgia Brown" (Ben Bernie, Kenneth Casey, Maceo Pinkard) – 1:59
6. "Frankie and Johnny" (Traditional) – 4:02
7. "Soldier's Joy" (Traditional) – 2:27
8. "What Is Home Without Love?" (Bill Monroe, Charlie Monroe) – 3:39
9. "Fiddle-Tune Medley" (Traditional) – 3:10
10. "Kentucky Waltz" (Bill Monroe) – 3:34
11. "My Dear Old Southern Home" (Ellsworth Cozzens, Jimmie Rodgers) – 2:49
12. "Florida Blues" (Traditional) – 2:38
13. "Blue as I Can Be" (Jimmie Rodgers) – 3:20
14. "Watson Blues" (Bill Monroe, Doc Watson) – 3:52

== Personnel ==
- Doc Watson – guitar, vocals
- David Grisman – mandolin
- Stuart Duncan – fiddle
- Jack Lawrence – guitar
- James Kerwin – bass
- Alan O'Bryant – banjo
- Curly Seckler – harmony vocals

Production notes

- Produced by David Grisman
- Engineered by Tom Anderson, David Dennison, Bob Shumaker
- Mixed by David Dennison
- Mastered by Paul Stubblebine
- Photography by David Gahr, Jon Sievert, D. Brent Hauseman
- Design by D. Brent Hauseman
- Liner notes by Ralph Rinzler
- Executive producer – Craig Miller
