= Live and Pickin' =

Live album by Doc Watson and Merle Watson
- Released: 1979
- Recorded: October 11–13, 1978
- Venue: Great American Music Hall, San Francisco, CA
- Genre: Folk, blues
- Length: 38:50
- Label: United Artists
- Producer: Mitch Greenhill

Doc Watson chronology
Look Away! (1978)	Live and Pickin' (1979)	Reflections (1980)

Live and Pickin' is a live album by Doc Watson and Merle Watson, released in 1979.

Live and Pickin' went out-of-print and was re-issued in 2003 by Southern Music packaged with Doc and the Boys.

At the Grammy Awards of 1980, "Big Sandy/Leather Britches" won the Grammy Award for Best Country Instrumental Performance.

== Track listing ==
1. "Dig a Little Deeper in the Well" (Roger Bowling, Jody Emerson) – 3:33
2. "Milk Cow Blues" (Kokomo Arnold) – 5:03
3. "Wild Bill Jones" (Traditional) – 2:55
4. "Memories of You Dear" (Harley Huggins) – 2:40
5. "Daybreak Blues (Blue Yodel No. 12)" (Jimmie Rodgers) – 4:01
6. "Big Sandy/Leather Britches" (Traditional) – 1:50
7. "Let the Cocaine Be" (Traditional) – 2:32
8. "All I Have to Do Is Dream" (Felice Bryant, Boudleaux Bryant) – 2:50
9. "Got the Blues (Can't Be Satisfied)" (Mississippi John Hurt) – 3:31
10. "St. James Hospital/Frosty Morn" (Traditional) – 6:30
11. "Streamline Cannonball" (Roy Acuff) – 3:25
  Additional tracks on the Southern Music release:
12. "All I Have to Do Is Dream" (Felice Bryant, Boudleaux Bryant) – 3:08

== Personnel ==
- Doc Watson – vocals, guitar, harmonica, banjo
- Merle Watson – guitar, banjo, slide guitar
- T. Michael Coleman – bass, background vocals

Produced by Mitch Greenhill, Recorded by Wally Heider Recording, Engineer Biff Dawes
