= Third Generation Blues =

Studio album by Doc Watson, Richard Watson
- Released: April 20, 1999
- Recorded: The Loft, Boone, NC, and Falls Church, VA
- Genre: Folk
- Length: 48:17
- Label: Sugar Hill
- Producer: Richard Watson

Doc Watson chronology
Del Doc & Mac (1998)	Third Generation Blues (1999)	The Best of Doc Watson: 1964-1968 (1999)

Professional ratings
Review scores
Source	Rating
AllMusic	4/5 stars

Third Generation Blues is an album by American folk music artist Doc Watson and his grandson Richard Watson, released in 1999.

== Track listing ==
1. "Honey Please Don't Go" (Bukka White) – 2:48
2. "If I Were a Carpenter" (Tim Hardin) – 2:51
3. "House of the Rising Sun" (Holmes, Ray) – 3:19
4. "Gypsy Davey" (Ken Darby) – 4:34
5. "St. James Infirmary" (Joe Primrose, Traditional) – 5:04
6. "Uncloudy Day" (Josiah K. Alwood) – 2:51
7. "South Coast" (Richard Dehr, Sam Eskin, Frank Miller, Lillian Bos Ross) – 4:05
8. "Milk Cow Blues" (Kokomo Arnold) – 4:00
9. "Train Whistle Blues" (Jimmie Rodgers) – 2:59
10. "Moody River" (Gary D. Bruce) – 2:55
11. "Columbus Stockade Blues" (Jimmie Davis, Eva Sagent) – 3:31
12. "Walk on Boy" (Mel Tillis, Wayne Walker) – 3:08
13. "Summertime" (George Gershwin, Ira Gershwin, DuBose Heyward) – 3:25
14. "Precious Lord Take My Hand" (Thomas A. Dorsey, George Nelson Allen, Thomas Shepherd) – 2:47

== Personnel ==
- Doc Watson – guitar, harmonica, vocals
- Richard Watson – guitar
- T. Michael Coleman – bass

Production notes

- Produced by Richard Watson
- Engineered, mixed and mastered by Bill Wolf
- Photography by Rosa Lee Watson
- Design by Sue Meyer
