= Then and Now (Doc Watson album) =

1973 studio album by Doc Watson and Merle Watson

Studio album by Doc Watson, Merle Watson
- Released: 1973
- Recorded: 1972
- Studio: Jack Clement Recording (Nashville, Tennessee)
- Genre: Folk, blues
- Length: 27:08
- Label: Tomato
- Producer: Jack Clement

Doc Watson chronology
The Elementary Doctor Watson! (1972)	Then and Now (1973)	The Essential Doc Watson (1973)

Then and Now is a 1973 studio album by American country music artists, and father-and-son team, Doc Watson and Merle Watson. The album won the Grammy Award for Best Ethnic or Traditional Folk Recording in 1974.

In 1984, Sugar Hill records re-issued versions—which excluded some tracks—of both Then and Now and Two Days in November. BGO Records released both, with additional tracks from The Elementary Doctor Watson!, in 2002.

== Reception ==
Professional ratings
Review scores
Source	Rating
Allmusic	4/5 stars

Writing for Allmusic, music critic Lindsay Palmer called the Watsons' style an "inimitable blend of acoustic folk and traditional country" and wrote "Their somewhat stylized selection of material is derived not only from the traditional genres, but also from the Watsons' native southeastern United States and its rich Piedmont blues heritage. The results are uniformly brilliant..."

== Track listing ==
1. "Bonaparte's Retreat" (Pee Wee King, Redd Stewart) – 2:02
2. "Milk Cow Blues" (Kokomo Arnold) – 2:16
3. "Bottle of Wine" (Tom Paxton) – 2:06
4. "Match Box Blues" (Blind Lemon Jefferson) – 3:33
5. "If I Needed You" (Townes Van Zandt) – 2:36
6. "Frankie and Johnny" (Traditional) – 3:09
7. "That's All" (Merle Travis) – 2:58
8. "Corrina, Corrina" (Traditional) – 2:49
9. "Meet Me Somewhere in Your Dreams" (Cook) – 1:58
10. "Old Camp Meetin' Time" (Traditional) – 2:11
11. "Rain Crow Bill" (Traditional) – 1:30

== Personnel ==
- Doc Watson – guitar, harmonica, vocals
- Merle Watson – guitar, banjo
- Norman Blake – dobro
- Vassar Clements – fiddle
- Bobby Seymour – pedal steel guitar
- Joe Allen – bass
- Kenny Malone – percussion

== Production notes ==
- Produced by Jack Clement
- Executive producer – Kevin Eggers
- Mastered by Paul Zinman
- Design by Milton Glaser
- Photography by Mike Salisbury
