= The Essential Doc Watson =

Compilation album by Doc Watson
- Released: 1973
- Recorded: 1963, 1964
- Genre: Folk, blues
- Length: 65:56
- Label: Vanguard
- Producer: Ralph Rinzler, Jack Lothrop

Doc Watson chronology
Then and Now (1973)	The Essential Doc Watson (1973)	Two Days in November (1974)

The Essential Doc Watson is the title of a recording by Doc Watson, released in 1973. It was originally released as a double-LP.

The first LP of the original release contains studio recordings from Watson's early Vanguard releases. The second LP tracks were recorded live at the Newport Folk Festival in 1964 and 1965. It was re-issued on CD in 1991.

== Reception ==
Professional ratings
Review scores
Source	Rating
Allmusic	5/5 stars

Writing for Allmusic, music critic Bruce Eder gave the compilation 5 of 5 stars and wrote of the album "As for the music itself, it's about as wide and varied a body as one could wish for... Although it's not as thorough an account of his musicianship as the four-CD Vanguard Years compilation, this disc does give any neophyte a good look at what he's about, and the music is excellent on its own terms."

== Track listing ==
All songs Traditional unless otherwise noted.

1. "Tom Dooley" – 3:13
2. "Alberta" (Lead Belly) – 2:40
3. "Froggie Went A-Courtin'" – 4:02
4. "Beaumont Rag" – 1:37
5. "St. James Hospital" (James "Iron Head" Baker) – 3:25
6. "Muskrat" – 2:51
7. "Down in the Valley to Pray" – 1:57
8. "Blue Railroad Train" (Alton Delmore, Rabon Delmore) – 2:41
9. "Rising Sun Blues" (Ashley) –4:17
10. "Shady Grove" – 2:55
11. "My Rough and Rowdy Ways" (Elsie McWilliams, Jimmie Rodgers) – 2:28
12. "The Train That Carried My Girl from Town" – 3:45
  Live from the Newport Folk Festival:
13. "Black Mountain Rag" – 1:30
14. "I Was a Stranger" (Jimmie Rodgers) – 3:05
15. "Blue Ridge Mountain Blues" – 2:20
16. "Country Blues" (Dock Boggs) – 3:05
17. "Ground Hog" – 1:40
18. "Little Orphan Girl" – 2:50
19. "Blackberry Blossom" – 1:50
20. "Going Down the Road Feeling Bad" – 2:05
21. "Rambling Hobo" – 0:56
22. "Omie Wise" – 4:05
23. "Handsome Molly" – 2:00
24. "White House Blues" – 1:30
25. "I Want to Love Him More" – 2:05
26. "Way Downtown" – 2:00

== Personnel ==
- Doc Watson – guitar, banjo, harmonica, vocals
- Merle Watson – banjo, guitar
- Gaither Carlton – fiddle
- Floyd Cramer – piano
- Buddy Harman – drums
- Clint Howard – vocals
- Roy M. "Junior" Huskey – bass
- Shot Jackson – dobro
- Tommy Jackson – fiddle
- Grady Martin – dobro, guitar
- Fred Price – fiddle
- Russ Savakus – bass
- Buddy Spicher – fiddle
- Don Stover – banjo
- Arnold Watson – banjo, vocals
- Mrs. General Dixon Watson – vocals
- Eric Weissberg – bass
