= Old-Timey Concert =

Live album by Doc Watson, Clint Howard and Fred Price
- Released: 1967
- Recorded: 1967
- Venue: Seattle Folklore Society, Seattle, WA
- Genre: Folk, country blues
- Length: 70:59 (CD Version)
- Label: Vanguard
- Producer: Manny Greenhill

Doc Watson chronology
Strictly Instrumental (1967)	Old-Timey Concert (1967)	Doc Watson in Nashville: Good Deal! (1968)

Old-Timey Concert is the title of a live recording by American folk music artist Doc Watson, Clint Howard and Fred Price. Originally a "Double LP", now one CD with four tracks omitted: Tracks 8, 15, 16 and 19.Recorded in 1967 for the Seattle Folklore Society.

Professional ratings
Review scores
Source	Rating
Allmusic	4/5 stars

== Track listing ==
1. "Introduction" – 0:59
2. "New River Train" (Traditional; arranged and adapted by Doc Watson) – 3:01
3. "What Does the Deep Sea Say" (Monroe Brothers) – 3:41
4. "Sunny Tennessee" (arranged and adapted by Doc Watson) – 3:43
5. "Walkin' in Jerusalem" (arranged and adapted by Doc Watson) – 2:09
6. "Sitting on Top of the World" (Sam Chatmon, Walter Vinson) – 3:33
7. "Pretty Little Pink" (Traditional; arranged and adapted by Doc Watson) – 1:58
8. "Sears-Roebuck Routine" (Story) - 1:30 (not on the CD)
9. "My Home's Across the Blue Ridge Mountains" (Clarence "Tom" Ashley, A. P. Carter) – 3:21
10. "Slew Foot" (Porter Wagoner, George Flower) – 2:36
11. "Little Orphan Girl" (Traditional; arranged and adapted by Doc Watson) – 3:14
12. "Long Journey Home" (arranged and adapted by Doc Watson) – 2:37
13. "Rank Stranger" (Traditional; arranged and adapted by Doc Watson) – 2:56
14. "Crawdad" (arranged and adapted by Doc Watson) – 3:55
15. "There's More Pretty Girls Than One" (Fiddlin' Arthur Smith, Alton Delmore) - 2:48 (not on the CD)
16. "My Mama's Gone (Gambler's Yodel)" (Alton Delmore) - 2:38 (not on the CD)
17. "Fire on the Mountain" (Traditional; arranged and adapted by Doc Watson) – 2:45
18. "East Bound Train" (arranged and adapted by Doc Watson) – 3:34
19. "Reuben's Train" (arranged and adapted by Doc Watson) - 2:41 (not on the CD)
20. "On the Banks of the Old Tennessee" (G. B. Grayson) – 3:30
21. "Mountain Dew" (Bascom Lamar Lunsford, "Mac" Scott Wiseman) – 3:58
22. "Corrina, Corrina" (Traditional; arranged and adapted by Doc Watson) – 2:31
23. "Footprints in the Snow" (Traditional; adapted by the Monroe Brothers) – 4:03
24. "I Saw a Man at the Close of Day" (G. B. Grayson, Henry Whitter) – 3:11
25. "Cackling Hen" (Traditional; arranged and adapted by Doc Watson) – 1:41
26. "Wanted Man" (Bob Hilliard, "Al" Lee Pockriss) – 2:17
27. "Way Downtown" (Traditional; arranged and adapted by Doc Watson) – 2:27
28. "Will the Circle Be Unbroken" (Traditional; arranged and adapted by Doc Watson) – 4:13

== Personnel ==
- Doc Watson – guitar, harmonica, mandolin, banjo, vocals
- Clint Howard – guitar, vocals
- Fred Price – fiddle, vocals

Production notes

- Fritz Richmond – engineer
- Phil Williams – engineer
- Mark Barry – mixing
