= Doc Watson at Gerdes Folk City =

Doc Watson at Gerde's Folk City

Compilation album by Doc Watson
- Released: September 11, 2001
- Recorded: 1962–1963
- Genres: Folk, blues
- Label: Sugar Hill
- Producer: Peter K. Siegel

Doc Watson chronology
| Foundation (2000) | Doc Watson at Gerde's Folk City (2001) | Songs from Home (2002) |

Doc Watson at Gerde's Folk City is the title of live recordings by American folk music and country blues artist Doc Watson, released in 2001. The recordings are of Watson's first solo public performances, recorded in 1962 and 1963 at Gerde's Folk City. The tracks were never released prior to 2001.

== Reception ==
Professional ratings
Review scores
| Source | Rating |
|---|---|
| Allmusic | 3/5 stars |

Writing for Allmusic, music critic Rick Anderson wrote of the album "... what is consistently striking is his mastery of the stage and the warmth and gentle virtuosity of his playing — attributes that would later come to define his art, but which are remarkable in an artist performing solo for the first time... Highly recommended."

== Track listing ==
1. "Little Sadie" (Traditional) – 2:23
2. "Blue Smoke" (Merle Travis) – 2:12
3. "St. Louis Blues" (W. C. Handy) – 2:36
4. "John Herald Introduction" – 0:39
5. "Sing Song Kitty" – 2:51
6. "The House Carpenter" (Traditional) – 4:30
7. "Liberty" (Traditional) – 1:46
8. "The Old Wooden Rocker" (Bradley Kincaid) – 3:06
9. "Milk Cow Blues" (Kokomo Arnold) – 2:10
10. "Tragic Romance" (Grandpa Jones aka Louis Marshall Jones) – 3:59
11. "The Dream of the Miner's Child" (Andrew Jenkins) – 3:07
12. "The Wagoner's Lad" – 3:20
13. "Cannonball Rag" (Merle Travis) – 1:54
14. "The Lone Pilgrim" – 4:27
15. "The Roving Gambler" – 2:28

== Personnel ==
- Doc Watson – guitar, banjo, mandolin, harmonica, vocals
- Bob Yellin – banjo
- John Herald – guitar, vocals
- The Greenbriar Boys

Production notes:

- Producer, liner notes, mastering by Peter K. Siegel
- Photography by John Cohen and David Gahr, George Pickow
- Mastering by David Glasser
