= Doc and the Boys =

Studio album by Doc Watson
- Released: 1976
- Studio: Jack's Tracks (Nashville, Tennessee); "Hub Pub", Winston-Salem, North Carolina
- Genre: Folk, blues
- Length: 35:00
- Label: United Artists
- Producer: Chuck Cochran

Doc Watson chronology
Memories (1975)	Doc and the Boys (1976)	Lonesome Road (1977)

Doc and the Boys is the title of a recording by Doc Watson, released in 1976.

Doc and the Boys is out-of-print and was re-issued in 2003 by Southern Music packaged with Live and Pickin'.

Professional ratings
Review scores
Source	Rating
Allmusic	

== Track listing ==
1. "Darlin' Cory" (Traditional) – 2:38
2. "Cypress Grove Blues" (Skip James) – 4:02
3. "I Can't Help But Wonder (Where I'm Bound)" (Tom Paxton) – 2:54
4. "The Girl I Love" (Traditional) – 2:41
5. "Natural Born Gamblin' Man" (Tex Atchison, Merle Travis) – 2:24
6. "Little Maggie" (Traditional) – 3:20
7. "Love Please Come Home" (Leon Jackson) – 3:36
8. "Spikedriver Blues" (Mississippi John Hurt) – 2:45
9. "Southbound Passenger Train" (Traditional) – 2:23
10. "Southern Lady" (John Hill) – 3:35
11. "Tennessee Stud" (Jimmy Driftwood) – 4:42
  Additional tracks on the Southern Music release:
12. "All I Have to Do Is Dream" (Felice Bryant, Boudleaux Bryant) – 3:08

== Personnel ==
- Doc Watson – vocals, guitar
- Merle Watson – guitar, banjo
- T. Michael Coleman – bass, harmony vocals
- Johnny Gimble – fiddle
- Chuck Cochran – piano, keyboards, bass
- Jim Isbell – drums
- Allen Reynolds – background vocals
- Garth Fundis – background vocals
- Bob Hill – piano, washboard, pans, horns, bell, lead and harmony vocals
- Joe Smothers – guitar, lead and harmony vocals
