= Red Rocking Chair =

Studio album by Doc Watson, Merle Watson
- Released: 1981
- Recorded: Dec 1980–Jan 1981, Crimson Sound, Santa Monica, CA
- Genre: Folk, blues
- Length: 28:46
- Label: Flying Fish
- Producer: Mitch Greenhill

Doc Watson chronology
| Reflections (1980) | Red Rocking Chair (1981) | Doc and Merle Watson's Guitar Album (1983) |

Red Rocking Chair is an album by Doc and Merle Watson, released in 1981 on the Flying Fish label.

== Reception ==
Professional ratings
Review scores
| Source | Rating |
|---|---|
| Allmusic | 3.5/5 stars |

Writing for Allmusic, music critic Steve Leggett wrote of the album "Watson brings his own considerable guitar and banjo skills to bear on this selection of folk and blues tunes. Doc's voice is as easy and as comfortable as an old fishing hat ... further proof of how Watson makes everything he touches fit into his personal and seamless tour of American folk music."

== Track listing ==
1. "Sadie" (T. Michael Coleman, Byron Hill) – 2:23
2. "Fisher's Hornpipe/Devil's Dream" (Traditional) – 1:38
3. "Along the Road" (Dan Fogelberg) – 2:42
4. "Smoke, Smoke, Smoke" (Merle Travis, Tex Williams) – 2:39
5. "Below Freezing" (Coleman) – 2:12
6. "California Blues" (Jimmie Rodgers) – 3:13
7. "John Hurt" (Tom Paxton, Doc Watson) – 2:22
8. "Mole in the Ground" (Traditional) – 2:22
9. "Any Old Time" (Jimmie Rodgers) – 2:21
10. "Red Rocking Chair" (Traditional, Watson) – 1:57
11. "How Long Blues" (Leroy Carr) – 2:42
12. "Down Yonder" (Traditional) – 2:15

== Personnel ==
- Doc Watson – vocals, guitar, harmonica, banjo
- Merle Watson – guitar, banjo
- T. Michael Coleman – bass, harmony vocals
- Herb Pedersen – harmony vocals
- Ron Tutt – drums
- Gene Estes – percussion
- Hank "Bones" Kahn – bones
- Al Perkins – pedal steel guitar
- Charlie Musselwhite – harmonica
- Byron Berline – fiddle
- Tom Scott – clarinet

Production notes

- Mitch Greenhill – producer
- Hank Cicalo – engineer
- Milt Calise – assistant engineer
- Jon Hartley Fox – liner notes
