= Americana Master Series (Doc Watson album) =

2008 compilation album by Doc Watson

Americana Master Series: Best of the Sugar Hill Years

Compilation album by Doc Watson
- Released: July 8, 2008
- Genre: Folk, blues
- Length: 40:10
- Label: Sugar Hill

Doc Watson chronology
Vanguard Visionaries (2007)	Americana Master Series: Best of the Sugar Hill Years (2008)

Americana Master Series: Best of the Sugar Hill Years is the title of a recording by American folk music and country blues artist Doc Watson, released in 2008.

== Reception ==
Professional ratings
Review scores
Source	Rating
Allmusic	4/5 stars

Writing for Allmusic, music critic Steve Leggett wrote of the album "Any of Watson's many Sugar Hill albums is well worth checking out on its own, but this succinct sampler of some of the wonderful moments from those albums is proof of how Watson makes everything he touches fit into his personal and seamless tour of American folk music in all of its interconnected shapes and forms."

== Track listing ==
1. "Slidin' Delta" (Mississippi John Hurt) – 2:02
2. "My Dear Old Southern Home" (Ellsworth Cozzens, Jimmie Rodgers) – 2:24
3. "Country Blues" (Dock Boggs) – 3:25
4. "You Must Come in at the Door" (Sunny Skylar, Doc Watson) – 2:16
5. "Greenville Trestle High" (James Jett) – 3:29
6. "Bright Sunny South" (Traditional) – 2:36
7. "Let the Church Roll On" (A. P. Carter) – 2:57
8. "My Little Woman, You're So Sweet" (Traditional) – 2:22
9. "Watson's Blues" (Bill Monroe) – 3:33
10. "Wreck of the Old Number Nine" (Carson Robison) – 2:53
11. "Solid Gone" (A. P. Carter) – 3:02
12. "Whiskey Before Breakfast" (Traditional) – 2:55
13. "What Does the Deep Sea Say?" (Wade Mainer) – 3:31
14. "Your Long Journey" (Watson, Watson) – 2:45

== Personnel ==
- Doc Watson – vocals, guitar, banjo
- Merle Watson – banjo, guitar
- Sam Bush – mandolin
- T. Michael Coleman – bass, harmony vocals
- Buddy Davis – bass
- Jerry Douglas – dobro
- Stuart Duncan – fiddle
- Béla Fleck – banjo
- Jack Lawrence – guitar
- Alan O'Bryant – harmony vocals
- Mark Schatz – bass
- Marty Stuart – mandolin
- Bryan Sutton – guitar
