= Lonesome Road (album) =

Studio album by Doc Watson and Merle Watson
- Released: 1977
- Studio: Studio in the Country, Bogalusa, Louisiana
- Genre: Folk, blues
- Label: United Artists

Doc Watson chronology
Doc and the Boys (1977)	Lonesome Road (1977)	Tradition (1977)

Lonesome Road is the title of a recording by Doc Watson and Merle Watson, released in 1977.

Lonesome Road is out-of-print and was re-issued on CD in 1998 by BGO Records. It was also released in 2002 by Southern Music packaged with Look Away!.

== Reception ==
Professional ratings
Review scores
Source	Rating
Allmusic	3.5/5 stars

Writing for Allmusic, music critic Jim Worbois wrote of the album "Doc does the country blues as well as anything else he does and this record is filled with some fine performances."

== Track listing ==
1. "I Recall a Gypsy Woman" (Bob McDill, Allen Reynolds) – 3:49
2. "Minglewood Blues" (Noah Lewis) – 2:58
3. "Mean Mama Blues" (Ernest Tubb) – 2:51
4. "Look up Look Down That Lonesome Road" (Traditional) – 4:02
5. "My Creole Belle" (J. Bodewalt Lampe) – 2:42
6. "Blue Railroad Train" (Alton Delmore) – 2:18
7. "Ain't Nobody's Fault But Mine" (Traditional) – 2:45
8. "Stone Wall (Around My Heart)" (Pat Twitty) – 3:26
9. "I Ain't Going Honky-Tonkn' Anymore" (Ernest Tubb) – 3:02
10. "Broomstraw Philosophers and Scuppernong Wine" (Larry John Wilson) – 3:17

== Personnel ==
- Doc Watson – vocals, guitar, harmonica
- Merle Watson – guitar, dobro, slide guitar
- T. Michael Coleman – bass
- Bob Wilson – piano
- Karl Himmel – drums, percussion
