= Trouble in Mind: Doc Watson Country Blues Collection =

Trouble in Mind: The Doc Watson Country Blues Collection

Compilation album by Doc Watson
- Released: April 8, 2003
- Genre: Folk, blues
- Label: Sugar Hill
- Producer: Fred Jasper (compilation)

Doc Watson chronology
Tennessee Stud (2003)	Trouble in Mind: The Doc Watson Country Blues Collection (2003)	Sittin' Here Pickin' the Blues (2004)

Trouble in Mind: The Doc Watson Country Blues Collection (or simply Trouble in Mind) is the title of a recording by American folk music and country blues artist Doc Watson, released in 2003. It contains recordings by Watson in the country blues style.

Professional ratings
Review scores
Source	Rating
Allmusic	4/5 stars

== Track listing ==
1. "Country Blues" (Traditional) – 3:32
2. "Sitting on Top of the World" (Sam Chatmon, Walter Vinson) – 2:38
3. "Little Sadie" (Traditional) – 1:59
4. "Gambler's Yodel" (Alton Delmore, Rabon Delmore) – 2:54
5. "Rain Crow Bill" (Whittier) – 1:46
6. "My Little Woman, You're So Sweet" (Traditional) – 2:21
7. "Lost John" (Traditional) – 3:26
8. "Deep River Blues" (Traditional) – 3:38
9. "Georgie Buck" (Traditional) – 2:18
10. "Anniversary Blue Yodel [Blue Yodel No. 7]" (Jimmie Rodgers) – 2:10
11. "Memphis Blues" (Miller) – 1:35
12. "Stackolee" (Traditional) – 3:54
13. "Worried Blues" (Traditional) – 2:52
14. "Spike Driver Blues" (Mississippi John Hurt) – 2:58
15. "Never No Mo' Blues" (Rodgers, Williams) – 3:13
16. "Honey Babe Blues" (Traditional) – 2:58
17. "White House Blues" (Traditional) – 1:55

== Personnel ==
- Doc Watson – guitar, banjo, harmonica, vocals
- Merle Watson – guitar, banjo
- Arnold Watson – banjo
- Eric Weissberg – bass
