= Pickin' the Blues =

Studio album by Doc Watson, Merle Watson
- Released: 1985
- Genre: Folk, country blues
- Length: 35:29
- Label: Flying Fish
- Producer: Mitch Greenhill, Merle Watson

Doc Watson chronology
Down South (1984)	Pickin' the Blues (1985)	Riding the Midnight Train (1986)

Pickin' the Blues is an album by American folk music artists Doc Watson and Merle Watson, released in 1985. In 2006, it was re-issued on a limited edition, 180 gram all-analog virgin vinyl record from Analogue Productions.

== Reception ==
Professional ratings
Review scores
Source	Rating
AllMusic	4/5 stars

Writing for AllMusic, music critic Eugene Chadbourne wrote of the album "What we have here is really a delightful blend of several different blues traditions, transcending the stupid questions of race as if it were a bit of dust that can be blown off the phonograph needle... Watson is such a fine vocalist that he is able to make a number such as this sound relatively fresh, no doubt helped by a blend of acoustic instruments not normally associated with this type of tune. But whatever style the players take on, everything is performed beautifully with deep feeling, comfortable tempos, and inspired picking that is never simply grandstanding. Fans of acoustic guitar will love this record — the instruments are recorded beautifully, especially in that warm, sonorous mid-register."

== Track listing ==
All songs Traditional unless otherwise noted.

1. "Mississippi Heavy Water Blues" (Barbeque Bob) – 2:48
2. "Sittin' Here Pickin' the Blues" (Coleman, Watson) – 3:07
3. "Stormy Weather" (Harold Arlen, Ted Koehler) – 3:44
4. "Windy and Warm" (John D. Loudermilk) – 2:02
5. "St. Louis Blues" (W. C. Handy) – 2:59
6. "Jailhouse Blues" (Sleepy John Estes) – 2:40
7. "Freight Train Blues" – 2:35
8. "Hobo Bill's Last Ride" (Jimmie Rodgers) – 3:36
9. "Carroll County Blues" – 2:47
10. "Blue Ridge Mountain Blues" – 2:44
11. "I'm a Stranger Here" – 3:07
12. "Honey Babe Blues" – 3:20

== Personnel ==
- Doc Watson – guitar, vocals, harmonica
- Merle Watson – guitar, slide guitar
- T. Michael Coleman – bass, harmony vocals
- Sam Bush – fiddle, mandolin
- Joe Smothers – background vocals (Track 2 Only)

Production notes

- Produced by Mitch Greenhill
- Mixed by Garth Fundis
- Engineered by Carl Rudisill
- Mastered by Roger Seibel (Original Release)
