= The Elementary Doctor Watson! =

Elementary Doctor Watson!

Studio album by Doc Watson and Merle Watson
- Released: 1972
- Recorded: 1972
- Studio: Jack Clement Recording (Nashville, Tennessee)
- Genre: Folk, blues
- Length: 39:15 (re-issue)
- Label: Tomato
- Producer: Jack Clement

Doc Watson chronology
Doc Watson on Stage (1971)	Elementary Doctor Watson! (1972)	Then and Now (1973)

Elementary Doctor Watson! is a studio album by the American country music artists Doc Watson and Merle Watson, released in 1972.

It peaked at #44 on the Billboard 200 chart.

== History ==
The Elementary Doctor Watson! is Watson's first album after leaving the Vanguard Records label for Poppy Records (Poppy Records' founder Kevin Eggers later started Tomato Records and published many of the Poppy Records catalogue as CDs). It was the first of three successive Watson albums to be produced by Jack Clement. The next two won Grammy awards.

The cover art was created by one of Poppy Records' favoured artists, Milton Glaser, who also employed his font "Glaser Stencil" on the album's back cover.

Doc dedicated the song "Treasures Untold" to his wife Rosa Lee.

Sugar Hill records re-issued The Elementary Doctor Watson! on CD with four bonus tracks.

== Reception ==
Professional ratings
Review scores
Source	Rating
AllMusic	4/5 stars
The Encyclopedia of Popular Music	3/5 stars

AllMusic's Jim Smith called the album "a great Sunday morning record, a genuine pleasure from start to finish."

== Track listing ==
1. "Going Down the Road Feeling Bad" (Traditional) – 2:48
2. "The Last Thing on My Mind" (Tom Paxton) – 3:19
3. "Freight Train Boogie" (Watson) – 3:00
4. "More Pretty Girls Than One" (Alton Delmore, Smith) – 2:49
5. "I Couldn't Believe It Was True" (Eddy Arnold, Wally Fowler) – 2:50
6. "Summertime" (George Gershwin, Ira Gershwin, DuBose Heyward) – 3:25
7. "Worried Blues" (Traditional) – 3:12
8. "Interstate Rag" (Watson) – 2:28
9. "Three Times Seven" (Cliff Stone, Merle Travis) – 2:18
10. "Treasures Untold" (Ellsworth Cozzens, Jimmie Rodgers) – 3:07
  Reissue bonus tracks:
11. "I'm Going Fishing" (Traditional) – 2:38
12. "Little Beggar Man/Old Joe Clark" (Traditional) – 2:08
13. "Frankie and Johnny" (Traditional) – 3:05
14. "Old Camp Meetin' Time" (Traditional) – 2:08

== Personnel ==
- Doc Watson – guitar, harmonica, vocals
- Merle Watson – guitar, banjo
- Norman Blake – dobro
- Vassar Clements – fiddle
- Joe Allen – bass
- Kenny Malone – percussion
- Charles Cochran – piano, string arrangements
- Jim Colvard – guitar, baritone guitar
- Jim Isbell – drums, sound effects
- Ken Lauber – piano

== Production notes ==
- Produced by Jack Clement
- Recorded at Jack Clement Recording Studio, Nashville, Tennessee
- Engineered by Ronnie Dean and Lee Hazen
- Cover art by Milton Glaser
- David Glasser – re-issue digital re-mastering
