= Deep Gap, North Carolina =

Deep Gap
- Unincorporated community
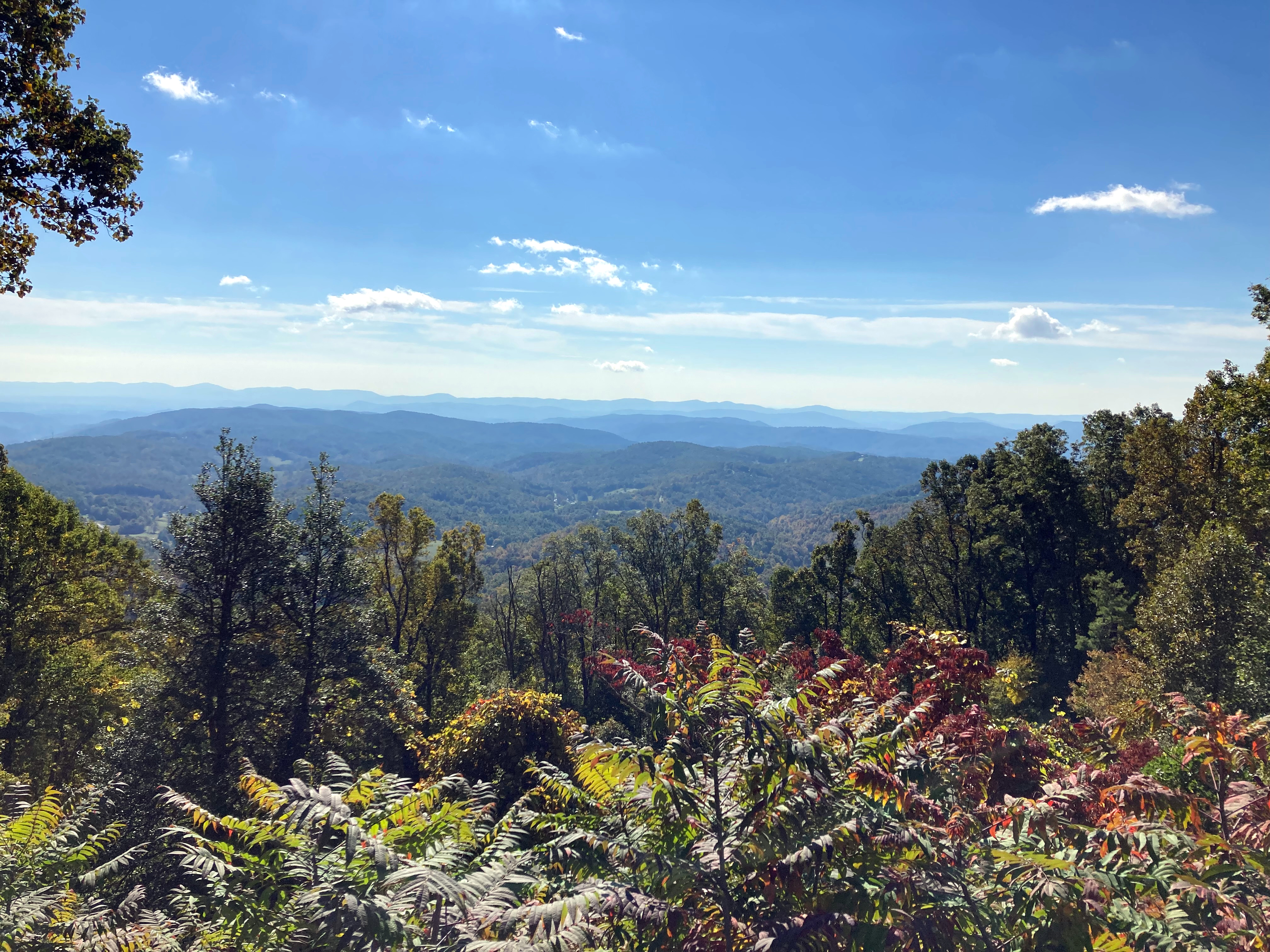
- Stoney Fork Overlook in Deep Gap

- Location within the state of North Carolina
- Coordinates: 36°14′13″N 81°30′44″W
- Country: United States
- State: North Carolina
- County: Watauga
- Elevation: 3,002 ft (915 m)
- Time zone: UTC-5 (Eastern (EST))
  - Summer (DST): UTC-4 (EDT)
- ZIP code: 28618
- Area code: 828
- GNIS feature ID: 984078

Deep Gap is an unincorporated community located in Watauga County, North Carolina, United States. The community is named after the natural gap, called Deep Gap, at Fire Scale Mountain, where the Blue Ridge Parkway crosses over US 421. Influential guitar player Doc Watson was born in Deep Gap and lived there until his death on May 29, 2012.

== History ==
In 1887, the Gap Creek Baptist Church was established.

== Notable people ==
- Doc Watson, guitar player
- Merle Watson, musician, son of Doc

== See also ==
- Powder Horn Mountain
- Tomkins Knob
