= Doc and Merle Watson's Guitar Album =

Studio album by Doc Watson, Merle Watson
- Released: 1983
- Recorded: December 1982
- Studio: Scruggs Sound (Berry Hill, Tennessee)
- Genre: Folk, country blues
- Length: 32:41
- Label: Flying Fish
- Producer: Mitch Greenhill

Doc Watson chronology
Red Rocking Chair (1981)	Doc and Merle Watson's Guitar Album (1983)	Down South (1984)

Doc and Merle Watson's Guitar Album is the title of a recording by American folk music artist Doc Watson and Merle Watson, first released in 1983.

It has been released on CD by Vanguard Records and Flying Fish Records.

Professional ratings
Review scores
Source	Rating
Allmusic	3/5 stars

== Track listing ==
1. "Sheeps in the Meadow/Stoney Fork" (Traditional) – 2:55
2. "Talking to Casey" (Coleman) – 2:29
3. "Liza/Lady Be Good" – 2:53
4. "Black Pine Waltz" (Traditional) – 2:32
5. "Guitar Polka" – 2:17
6. "Goin' to Chicago Blues" – 4:05
7. "Black Mountain Rag" (Traditional) – 2:37
8. "Cotton Row" – 2:45
9. "John Henry/Worried Blues" (Traditional) – 2:24
10. "Twinkle, Twinkle" (Traditional) – 3:01
11. "Take Me Out to the Ball Game" (Jack Norworth, Albert Von Tilzer) – 2:13
12. "Gonna Lay Down My Old Guitar" (Alton Delmore, Rabon Delmore) – 2:30

== Personnel ==
- Doc Watson – guitar, harmonica, vocals
- Merle Watson – guitar, slide guitar
- T. Michael Coleman – bass, guitar, harmony vocals
- Pat McInerney – percussion
- Mark O'Connor – fiddle, mandolin

Production notes

- Produced by Mitch Greenhill
- Engineered by Ernie Winfrey
- Mixed by Larry Forkner
- Illustrations by John Zielinski and Milton Glaser
- Design by Axie Breen and Lenora Davis
