= Doc Watson on Stage =

Live album by Doc Watson, Merle Watson
- Released: 1971
- Recorded: 1970
- Venue: Cornell University and The Town Hall, New York, NY
- Genre: Folk, country blues
- Length: 74:25 (LP version) 71:30 (CD version)
- Label: Vanguard
- Producer: Jack Lothrop

Doc Watson chronology
Doc Watson in Nashville: Good Deal! (1968)	Doc Watson on Stage (1971)	The Elementary Doctor Watson! (1972)

Doc Watson on Stage (sub-titled featuring Merle Watson) is the title of a live recording by American folk music artist Doc Watson, released in 1971. It was originally released as a double LP and contained many previously unreleased titles.

It was re-released on CD by Vanguard in 1990 minus the Hank Snow track 11, "Movin' On" included on the original release.

== Reception ==
Professional ratings
Review scores
Source	Rating
Allmusic	4/5 stars

Writing for Allmusic, music critic Matthew Greenwald called the album "One of Doc Watson's finest later records" and wrote "His feel and command of the instrument is truly incredible... A timeless slice from one of the fathers of modern country music."

== Track listing ==
1. "Brown's Ferry Blues" (Traditional) – 2:43
2. "The Wreck of the 1262" (Traditional) – 3:13
3. "Spikedriver Blues" (Mississippi John Hurt) – 3:02
4. "Deep River Blues" (Traditional) – 3:39
5. "Life Gits Teejus Don't It" (Carson Robison) – 4:36
6. "Lost John" (Traditional) – 3:32
7. "Hold the Woodpile Down" (Bob Johnson) – 2:58
8. "Billy in the Low Ground" (Instrumental) – 1:46
9. "I Am a Pilgrim" (Traditional) – 2:42
10. "The Clouds Are Gwine to Roll Away" (Carson Robison) – 2:51
11. "Movin' On" (melody by Hank Snow, parody lyrics written by Homer & Jethro) - 2:15 (not on the CD)
12. "Windy and Warm" (John D. Loudermilk) (Instrumental) – 2:32
13. "Doc's Guitar" (Doc Watson) (Instrumental) – 1:35
14. "Open Up Them Pearly Gates for Me" (Traditional) – 3:11
15. "The Preacher and the Bicycle" (Traditional Folk Tale) – 1:28
16. "Jimmy's Texas Blues" (Jimmie Rodgers) – 3:47
17. "Banks of the Ohio" (Traditional) – 3:45
18. "Roll On Buddy" (Traditional) – 3:04
19. "Southbound" (by Merle & Doc Watson) – 3:16
20. "Wabash Cannonball" (Traditional) – 3:07
21. "When the Work's All Done This Fall" (Traditional) – 3:42
22. "Little Sadie" (Traditional) – 2:37
23. "The Quaker's Cow" (Traditional Folk Tale) – 1:38
24. "Salt River/Bill Cheatham" (Instrumental) – 2:38
25. "Don't Let Your Deal Go Down" (Traditional) – 4:08

== Personnel ==
- Doc Watson – guitar, harmonica, vocals, banjo
- Merle Watson – guitar

Production notes

- Jack Lothrop – producer
- Ed Friedner – engineer
