= Tennessee Stud (album) =

Compilation album by Doc Watson
- Released: Jan 7, 2003
- Genre: Folk, blues
- Label: Music Mill

Doc Watson chronology
Legacy (2002)	Tennessee Stud (2003)	Trouble in Mind (2003)

Professional ratings
Review scores
Source	Rating
AllMusic	3/5 stars

Tennessee Stud is a recording by American folk music and country blues artist Doc Watson, released in 2003.

== Track listing ==
1. "Tennessee Stud" (Jimmie Driftwood) – 4:50
2. "Freight Train Boogie" (Watson) – 3:02
3. "Milk Cow Blues" (Kokomo Arnold) – 2:15
4. "Doc's Rag" (Watson) – 1:46
5. "My Rose of Old Kentucky" (Bill Monroe) – 2:38
6. "Double File/Salt Creek" – 1:40
7. "Blues, Stay Away from Me" (Delmore, Delmore, Glover) – 2:49
8. "Mama Don't Allow No Music" (Traditional) – 4:12
9. "Darlin' Cory" (Traditional) – 2:36
10. "God Holds the Future" (Traditional) – 2:51
