= Tennessee Stud =

American country music song

Single by Eddy Arnold
- B-side: "What's The Good (Of All This Love)"
- Released: 1959
- Genre: Pop
- Length: 3:09
- Label: RCA Victor
- Songwriter: Jimmy Driftwood

"Tennessee Stud" is a song written by Jimmy Driftwood, who originally recorded and released it in 1959. "Tennessee Stud" is considered to be Driftwood's most recorded song.

== Synopsis ==
The song tells a story about the adventures of a man and his horse, a courageous, sun-colored, green-eyed stallion he nicknamed the "Tennessee Stud". The song's timeline appears to take place during a period of over twenty years, beginning in 1825 and ending after the Great Flood of 1844.

After some trouble with his sweetheart's father and her outlaw brother, the man sends her a letter through his uncle and then rides away on his horse, the Tennessee Stud. Together they have a series of adventures, including winning big in a horse race against a Spanish foal south of the border, outmaneuvering a band of Indians, and then escaping after a shootout with a gambler who insulted Tennessee.

Eventually the man and his horse both become lonely and homesick, and ride back to Tennessee where the man gives his girl's father and outlaw brother their comeuppance. He and his girl, on her "Tennessee Mare", ride off together across "the mountains and the valleys wide", and then after crossing the "Big Muddy", and "fording the flood", build a cabin and settle down; the man and his girl marry and have a baby while Stud sires a colt with the mare.

== Eddy Arnold recording ==
Eddy Arnold was the first artist to cover the song. His version was a Top 5 hit on the Billboard Country Singles chart in 1959, and was nominated for a Grammy Award in both country and folk categories the same year.

== Chart history ==
| Chart (1959) | Peak position |
|---|---|
| U.S. Billboard Hot 100 | 48 |
| U.S. Billboard Hot C&W Sides | 5 |

== Cover versions ==
Other artists who have covered the song include:

- Doc Watson, whose first cover of the song was in his 1966 album Southbound. Interest in the song was renewed in 1972 when he re-recorded it with the Nitty Gritty Dirt Band in their rock/country crossover album, Will the Circle be Unbroken and again for his own 1976 album, Doc and the Boys. The song became an audience favorite when Watson added it to his live performances including a 1978 episode of Austin City Limits; he later remarked that he had performed the song an estimated five thousand times. Watson again released the song on his 2003 compilation album of the same name.
- Chet Atkins (who recorded an instrumental version of the song with Jerry Reed).
- Dobroist Mike Auldridge recorded an instrumental version on his album Blues and Bluegrass.
- Johnny Cash, whose version featured in the Quentin Tarantino film Jackie Brown.
- Hank Williams Jr.
- Michael Martin Murphey
- Osborne Brothers
- Nitty Gritty Dirt Band
- Chris LeDoux
- Country Joe McDonald
- Billy Strings
- Porter Wagoner
- Arlo Guthrie
- Meat Puppets
- Gillian Welch
- Jimmy Driftwood
