= Merle Watson =

North Carolina bluegrass and folk musician

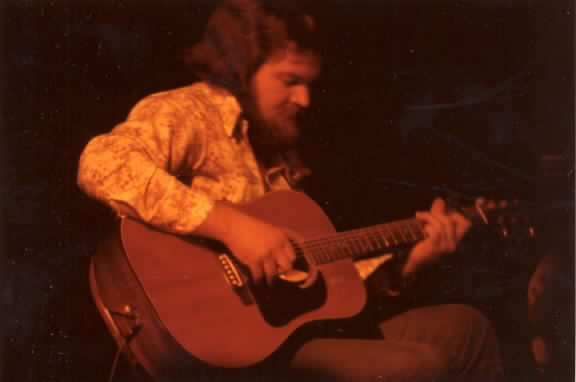
- Merle Watson c. 1979

Background information
- Also known as: Merle Watson
- Born: Eddy Merle Watson; February 8, 1949; Deep Gap, North Carolina
- Died: October 23, 1985 (aged 36) Lenoir, North Carolina
- Genres: Bluegrass; folk; country; blues; gospel
- Occupation: Musician
- Instruments: guitar, banjo

Eddy Merle Watson (February 8, 1949 – October 23, 1985) was an American folk and bluegrass guitarist. He was best known for his performances with his father, Doc Watson. Merle played and recorded albums together with his father from age 15 until his death in a tractor accident 21 years later. Merle was widely recognized as one of the best flat-picking and slide guitarists of his generation. MerleFest, one of the world's largest and most-prestigious folk music festivals, is held annually in Wilkesboro, NC and is named in his honor.

Merle and his father released a version of "Bottle of Wine" that reached No. 71 on the U.S. country chart.

== Death ==
Watson died in a farm accident in 1985 at age 36. He was driving a tractor to a nearby house when it slipped down an embankment and pinned him beneath it.

== Discography ==
All albums were in collaboration with his father, Doc Watson.

- 1965 – Doc Watson & Son
- 1967 – Ballads from Deep Gap
- 1971 – Doc Watson on Stage
- 1972 – The Elementary Doctor Watson!
- 1973 – Then and Now
- 1974 – Two Days in November
- 1976 – Doc and the Boys
- 1977 – Lonesome Road
- 1978 – Look Away!
- 1979 – Live and Pickin' (live)
- 1981 – Red Rocking Chair
- 1983 – Doc and Merle Watson's Guitar Album
- 1984 – Down South
- 1985 – Pickin' the Blues
- 1992 – Remembering Merle (Songs all recorded live between 1970 and 1976)

== Awards and honors ==
- 1974 Grammy for Best Ethnic Or Traditional Recording: Merle Watson & Doc Watson for Two Days In November
- 1979 Grammy for Best Country Instrumental Performance: Doc Watson & Merle Watson for Big Sandy/Leather Britches
- "Best Finger Picking Guitarist-Folk/Blues or Country" Award from Frets Magazine
