= List of Lonesome River Band members =

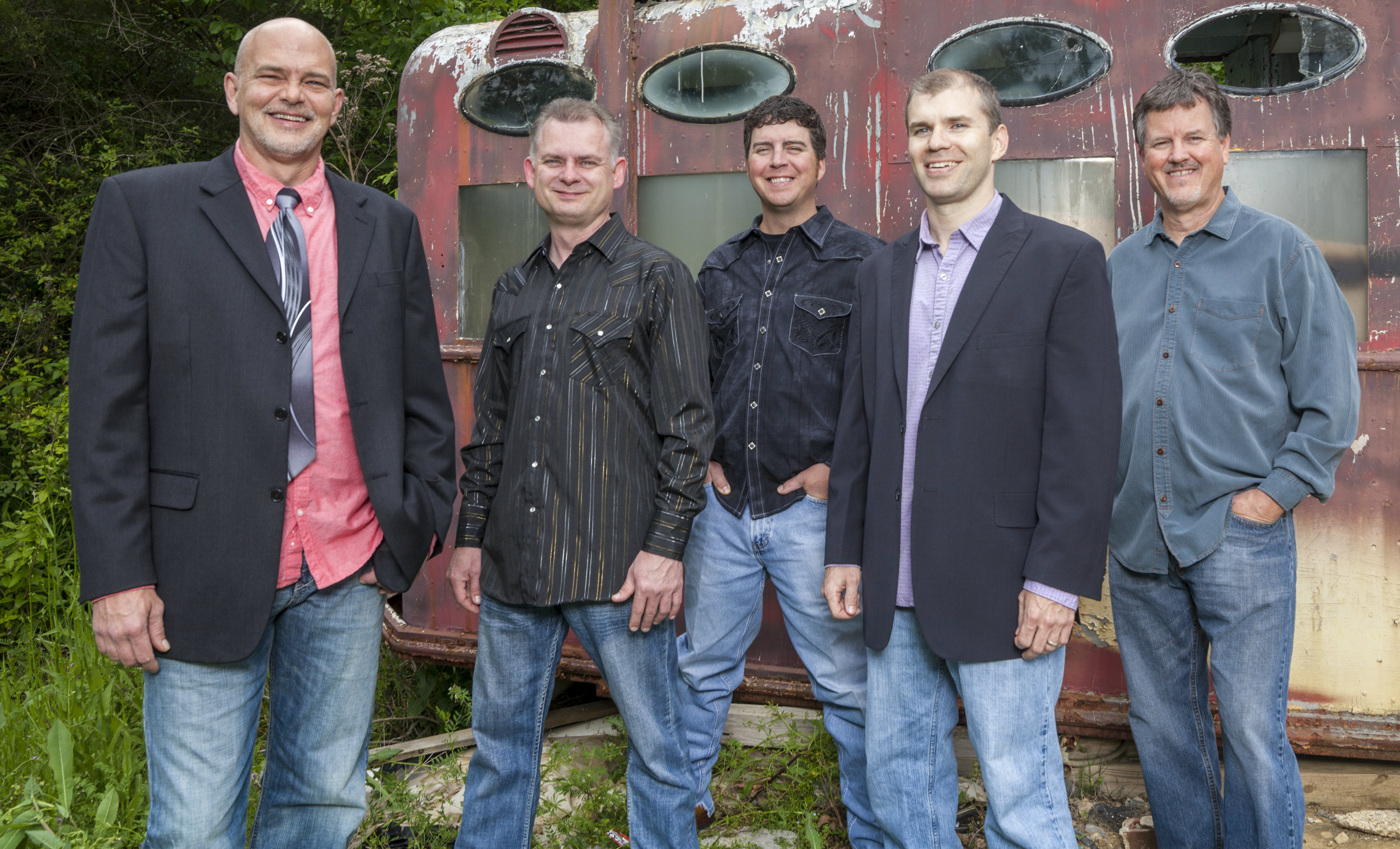
The Lonesome River Band in 2014.

The Lonesome River Band is an American bluegrass band from Meadows of Dan, Virginia. Formed in 1983, the group originally consisted of guitarist and vocalist Tim Austin, bassist and vocalist Jerry McMillan, mandolin and fiddle player Steve Thomas, and banjo player Rick Williams. Since Austin's departure in 1995, the band has featured none of its original members. The group's current lineup includes Sammy Shelor on banjo (since 1990), Mike Hartgrove on fiddle (from 2002 to 2005, and since 2008), Jesse Smathers on guitar and vocals (since 2015), Adam Miller on mandolin and vocals (since 2021), and Kameron Keller on bass (since 2021).

== History ==
The Lonesome River Band (LRB) was formed in mid-1983 by guitarist and vocalist Tim Austin, bassist and vocalist Jerry McMillan, mandolin and fiddler player Steve Thomas, and banjo player Rick Williams. Thomas and Williams left early on, replaced by Jeff Midkiff and Mike Jones, respectively. Allen Watkins replaced Jones for "most of 1984", before Billy Wheeler took his place in time for the recording of the band's debut album I Guess Heartaches Are in Style This Year. Just before recording began for a self-titled second album in March 1986, Rick Allred replaced Wheeler, although after just "a few weeks" he was replaced by Randy Driskill. The new lineup released The Lonesome River Band later in the year, before Midkiff left in June 1987 — he was replaced briefly by Ray Legere, followed by Adam Steffey; shortly after the latter's arrival in September, Driskill also departed, with Brian Fesler taking over in November. Fiddle on 1988's Saturday Night, Sunday Morning was performed by Steve Thomas.

During the summer of 1988, the LRB lost both Steffey and Fesler, with Dan Tyminski taking over initially on banjo before switching to mandolin. Tyminski also took over most of Austin's lead vocal duties, while Dale Perry replaced Fesler on banjo — both members debuted on 1989's Looking for Yourself. By September 1990, founding member Jerry McMillan had been replaced by Ronnie Bowman, while Perry had also made way for Sammy Shelor. The lineup of Austin, Tyminski, Bowman and Shelor was the band's first to release two albums without changing personnel — Carrying the Tradition in 1991 and Old Country Town in 1994 — although both Tyminski and Shelor spent a few months away from the band during 1992, before ultimately returning. In 1995, Austin became the last original member of LRB to leave the group, as he chose to "devote more time to working in his home recording studio, Doobie Shea". Following Austin's departure, Shelor and Bowman subsequently took over as bandleaders.

Tyminski left at the same time as Austin, with the pair replaced by guitarist Kenny Smith and mandolin player Don Rigsby for the recording of 1996's One Step Forward (Rigsby joined Bowman on lead vocals). Finding the Way and Talkin' to Myself followed in 1998 and 2000, respectively, the latter of which saw the introduction of the band's first full-time fiddle player, Rickie Simpkins. Talkin' to Myself was also the last LRB album to feature Bowman, Rigsby and Smith, all of whom left (alongside Simpkins) towards the end of 2001. The next year's Window of Time introduced new members Brandon Rickman on guitar and vocals, Jeff Parker on mandolin and vocals, Mike Hartgrove on fiddle, and Irl Hees on bass. Hees was replaced by John Wade and the band released Head On Into Heartache in 2005.

The LRB went through numerous lineup changes during late 2005. In August, Hartgrove left to rejoin Doyle Lawson's group Quicksilver; in September, Wade was replaced by Barry Berrier; and in October, Rickman left to focus on his work as a songwriter — replaced by Shannon Slaughter in January. The new lineup recorded The Road with No End that year, which also introduced Matt Leadbetter as the group's first official dobro player. LRB's lineup changed almost entirely again during 2007. In January, Parker was replaced by Andy Ball; in February, Berrier and Slaughter were replaced by Mike Anglin and a returning Brandon Rickman, respectively; and in December, the band announced the departure of Leadbetter and the return of Mike Hartgrove on fiddle. This lineup remained stable for two years, releasing No Turning Back in 2008 and Still Learning in 2010. Anglin was replaced by Barry Reed in September 2010. Ball also left in January 2011, with Randy Jones taking his place in March.

In 2012, the lineup of Rickman, Jones, Hartgrove, Shelor and Reed released a series of three extended plays titled Chronology, featuring re-recorded versions of songs from previous releases. This was followed by a new studio album, Turn on a Dime, in 2014. This was the last LRB release to feature Jones, who was replaced in June 2015 by Jesse Smathers. The new incarnation persisted for the next six years, releasing Bridging the Tradition in 2016, Mayhayley's House in 2017, Outside Looking In in 2019, and the tribute album Singing Up There: A Tribute to the Easter Brothers in 2021. In June 2021, long-time guitarist and vocalist Brandon Rickman left LRB, with Smathers taking his place on mandolin and Adam Miller joining as the band's new guitarist. The following month, Barry Reed also left the group, to be replaced by new bassist Kameron Keller. With new members Miller and Keller, the LRB released Heyday in 2022 and The Winning Hand in 2024.

== Members ==
=== Current ===
Image	Name	Years active	Instruments	Release contributions
	Sammy Shelor	1990–present	banjo; backing vocals; guitar and bass (early)	all Lonesome River Band (LRB) releases from Carrying the Tradition (1991) onwards
	Mike Hartgrove	2001–2005; 2008–present	fiddle	all LRB releases from Window of Hope (2002) onwards, except The Road with No End (2006)
	Jesse Smathers	2015–present	mandolin (until 2021); guitar (since 2021); lead and backing vocals	all LRB releases from Bridging the Tradition (2016) onwards
	Adam Miller	2021–present	mandolin; lead and backing vocals	Heyday (2022); The Winning Hand (2024)
	Kameron Keller	2021–present	bass; backing vocals	Heyday (2022); The Winning Hand (2024)

=== Former ===
Image	Name	Years active	Instruments	Release contributions
	Tim Austin	1983–1995	guitar; lead and backing vocals (lead until 1988)	all LRB releases from I Guess Heartaches Are in Style This Year (1985) to Old Country Town (1994)
	Jerry McMillan	1983–1990	bass; lead vocals	I Guess Heartaches Are in Style This Year (1985); The Lonesome River Band (1986); Saturday Night, Sunday Morning (1988); Looking for Yourself (1989)
	Steve Thomas	1983	mandolin; fiddle; backing vocals	Saturday Night, Sunday Morning (1988); Carrying the Tradition (1991)
	Rick Williams	1983	banjo; backing vocals	none
	Jeff Midkiff	1983–1987	mandolin; fiddle; backing vocals	I Guess Heartaches Are in Style This Year (1985); The Lonesome River Band (1986)
	Mike Jones	1983–1984	banjo; backing vocals	none
	Allen Watkins	1984	banjo; backing vocals	none
	Billy Wheeler	1984–1986	banjo; guitar; dobro; backing vocals	I Guess Heartaches Are in Style This Year (1985)
	Rick Allred	1986	banjo; backing vocals	none
	Randy Driskill	1986–1987	banjo; backing vocals	The Lonesome River Band (1986)
	Ray Legere	1987	mandolin; fiddle; backing vocals	none
	Adam Steffey	1987–1988	mandolin; backing vocals	Saturday Night, Sunday Morning (1988)
	Brian Fesler	1987–1988	banjo; backing vocals	Saturday Night, Sunday Morning (1988)
	Dan Tyminski	1988–1995	mandolin; guitar; bass; lead vocals	Looking for Yourself (1989); Carrying the Tradition (1991); Old Country Town (1994); Talkin' to Myself (2000)
	Dale Perry	1988–1990	banjo; backing vocals	Looking for Yourself (1989)
	Ronnie Bowman	1990–2001	bass; lead vocals	all LRB releases from Carrying the Tradition (1991) to Talkin' to Myself (2000)
	Don Rigsby	1995–2001	mandolin; lead vocals	One Step Forward (1996); Finding the Way (1998); Talkin' to Myself (2000)
	Kenny Smith	1995–2001	guitar; backing vocals	One Step Forward (1996); Finding the Way (1998); Talkin' to Myself (2000)
	Rickie Simpkins	1999–2001	fiddle; backing vocals	Old Country Town (1994); Talkin' to Myself (2000)
	Jeff Parker	2001–2007	mandolin; lead vocals	Window of Time (2002); Head On Into Heartache (2005); The Road with No End (2006)
	Brandon Rickman	2001–2005; 2007–2021	guitar; lead vocals	Window of Time (2002); Head On Into Heartache (2005); all LRB releases from No Turning Back (2008) to Singing Up There: A Tribute to the Easter Brothers (2021)
	Irl Hees	2001–2003	bass; backing vocals	Window of Time (2002)
	John Wade	2003–2005	bass; backing vocals	Head On Into Heartache (2005)
	Barry Berrier	2005–2007	bass; backing vocals	The Road with No End (2006)
	Shannon Slaughter	2006–2007	guitar; lead vocals	The Road with No End (2006)
	Matt Leadbetter	2006–2007	dobro	The Road with No End (2006)
	Andy Ball	2007–2011	mandolin; lead vocals	No Turning Back (2008); Still Learning (2010)
	Mike Anglin	2007–2010	bass; backing vocals	No Turning Back (2008); Still Learning (2010)
	Barry Reed	2010–2021	bass; backing vocals	all LRB releases from Chronology, Volume One (2012) to Singing Up There: A Tribute to the Easter Brothers (2021)
	Randy Jones	2011–2015	mandolin; lead vocals	Chronology, Volumes One, Two and Three (2012); Turn on a Dime (2014)

== Lineups ==
Period	Members	Releases
1983	Tim Austin — guitar, lead vocals; Steve Thomas — mandolin, fiddle, backing vocals; Rick Williams — banjo, backing vocals; Jerry McMillan — bass, lead vocals	none
1983–1984	Tim Austin — guitar, lead vocals; Jeff Midkiff — mandolin, fiddle, backing vocals; Mike Jones — banjo, backing vocals; Jerry McMillan — bass, lead vocals	none
1984	Tim Austin — guitar, lead vocals; Jeff Midkiff — mandolin, fiddle, backing vocals; Allen Watkins — banjo, backing vocals; Jerry McMillan — bass, lead vocals	none
1984–March 1986	Tim Austin — guitar, lead vocals; Jeff Midkiff — mandolin, fiddle, backing vocals; Billy Wheeler — banjo, guitar, backing vocals; Jerry McMillan — bass, lead vocals	I Guess Heartaches Are in Style This Year (1985)
March 1986	Tim Austin — guitar, lead vocals; Jeff Midkiff — mandolin, fiddle, backing vocals; Rick Allred — banjo, backing vocals; Jerry McMillan — bass, lead vocals	none
March 1986–June 1987	Tim Austin — guitar, lead vocals; Jeff Midkiff — mandolin, fiddle, backing vocals; Randy Driskill — banjo, backing vocals; Jerry McMillan — bass, lead vocals	The Lonesome River Band (1986)
Summer 1987	Tim Austin — guitar, lead vocals; Ray Legere — mandolin, fiddle, backing vocals; Randy Driskill — banjo, backing vocals; Jerry McMillan — bass, lead vocals	none
September 1987	Tim Austin — guitar, lead vocals; Adam Steffey — mandolin, backing vocals; Randy Driskill — banjo, backing vocals; Jerry McMillan — bass, lead vocals	none
November 1987–summer 1988	Tim Austin — guitar, lead vocals; Adam Steffey — mandolin, backing vocals; Brian Fesler — banjo, backing vocals; Jerry McMillan — bass, lead vocals	Saturday Night, Sunday Morning (1988)
Fall 1988–summer 1990	Tim Austin — guitar, backing vocals; Dan Tyminski — mandolin, lead vocals; Dale Perry — banjo, backing vocals; Jerry McMillan — bass, lead vocals	Looking for Yourself (1989)
September 1990–1995	Tim Austin — guitar, backing vocals; Dan Tyminski — mandolin, lead vocals; Sammy Shelor — banjo, guitar, backing vocals; Ronnie Bowman — bass, lead vocals	Carrying the Tradition (1991); Old Country Town (1994)
1995–1999	Kenny Smith — guitar, backing vocals; Don Rigsby — mandolin, lead vocals; Sammy Shelor — banjo, guitar, backing vocals; Ronnie Bowman — bass, lead vocals	One Step Forward (1996); Finding the Way (1998)
1999–2001	Kenny Smith — guitar, backing vocals; Don Rigsby — mandolin, lead vocals; Rickie Simpkins — fiddle, backing vocals; Sammy Shelor — banjo, guitar, backing vocals; Ronnie Bowman — bass, lead vocals	Talkin' to Myself (2000)
2001–2003	Brandon Rickman — guitar, lead vocals; Jeff Parker — mandolin, lead vocals; Mike Hartgrove — fiddle; Sammy Shelor — banjo, guitar, backing vocals; Irl Hees — bass, backing vocals	Window of Time (2002)
2003–August 2005	Brandon Rickman — guitar, lead vocals; Jeff Parker — mandolin, lead vocals; Mike Hartgrove — fiddle; Sammy Shelor — banjo, guitar, backing vocals; John Wade — bass, backing vocals	Head On Into Heartache (2005)
August–September 2005	Brandon Rickman — guitar, lead vocals; Jeff Parker — mandolin, lead vocals; Sammy Shelor — banjo, guitar, backing vocals; John Wade — bass, backing vocals	none
September–October 2005	Brandon Rickman — guitar, lead vocals; Jeff Parker — mandolin, lead vocals; Sammy Shelor — banjo, guitar, backing vocals; Barry Berrier — bass, backing vocals	none
January–June 2006	Shannon Slaughter — guitar, lead vocals; Jeff Parker — mandolin, lead vocals; Sammy Shelor — banjo, guitar, backing vocals; Barry Berrier — bass, backing vocals	none
June 2006–January 2007	Shannon Slaughter — guitar, lead vocals; Jeff Parker — mandolin, lead vocals; Sammy Shelor — banjo, guitar, backing vocals; Barry Berrier — bass, backing vocals; Matt Leadbetter — dobro	The Road with No End (2006)
January–February 2007	Shannon Slaughter — guitar, lead vocals; Andy Ball — mandolin, lead vocals; Sammy Shelor — banjo, guitar, backing vocals; Barry Berrier — bass, backing vocals; Matt Leadbetter — dobro	none
February–December 2007	Brandon Rickman — guitar, lead vocals; Andy Ball — mandolin, lead vocals; Sammy Shelor — banjo, guitar, backing vocals; Mike Anglin — bass, backing vocals; Matt Leadbetter — dobro	none
January 2008–September 2010	Brandon Rickman — guitar, lead vocals; Andy Ball — mandolin, lead vocals; Mike Hartgrove — fiddle; Sammy Shelor — banjo, guitar, backing vocals; Mike Anglin — bass, backing vocals	No Turning Back (2008); Still Learning (2010)
September 2010–January 2011	Brandon Rickman — guitar, lead vocals; Andy Ball — mandolin, lead vocals; Mike Hartgrove — fiddle; Sammy Shelor — banjo, guitar, backing vocals; Barry Reed — bass, backing vocals	none
March 2011–June 2015	Brandon Rickman — guitar, lead vocals; Randy Jones — mandolin, lead vocals; Mike Hartgrove — fiddle; Sammy Shelor — banjo, guitar, backing vocals; Barry Reed — bass, backing vocals	Chronology, Volume One (2012); Chronology, Volume Two (2012); Chronology, Volume Three (2012); Turn on a Dime (2014)
June 2015–June 2021	Brandon Rickman — guitar, lead vocals; Jesse Smathers — mandolin, lead vocals; Mike Hartgrove — fiddle; Sammy Shelor — banjo, guitar, backing vocals; Barry Reed — bass, backing vocals	Bridging the Tradition (2016); Mayhayley's House (2017); Outside Looking In (2019); Singing Up There (2021)
June–July 2021	Jesse Smathers — guitar, lead vocals; Adam Miller — mandolin, lead vocals; Mike Hartgrove — fiddle; Sammy Shelor — banjo, guitar, backing vocals; Barry Reed — bass, backing vocals	none
July 2021–present	Jesse Smathers — guitar, lead vocals; Adam Miller — mandolin, lead vocals; Mike Hartgrove — fiddle; Sammy Shelor — banjo, guitar, backing vocals; Kameron Keller — bass, backing vocals	Heyday (2022); The Winning Hand (2024)
