= 7th Annual International Bluegrass Music Awards =

1996 music award ceremony

- Date: September 26, 1996
- Location: RiverPark Center, Owensboro, Kentucky, US
- Hosted by: Ricky Skaggs

The 7th Annual International Bluegrass Music Awards were held on September 26, 1996, at RiverPark Center, Owensboro, Kentucky. The awards recognized accomplishments by musicians from the previous year. 5 awards were won by either Del McCoury or his sons (Ronnie McCoury, Rob McCoury) and they were nominated in 10 of the categories.

== Award winners ==
Entertainer of the Year

- The Del McCoury Band
- IIIrd Tyme Out
- Alison Krauss & Union Station
- Lonesome River Band
- Nashville Bluegrass Band

Vocal Group of the Year

- IIIrd Tyme Out
- Alison Krauss & Union Station
- Lonesome River Band
- Del McCoury
- Nashville Bluegrass Band

Instrumental Group of the Year

- The Del McCoury Band
- Richard Greene & The Grass Is Greener
- Alison Krauss & Union Station
- Nashville Bluegrass Band
- Tony Rice Unit

Male Vocalist of the Year

- Del McCoury
- Ronnie Bowman
- Dudley Connell
- Russell Moore
- Alan O'Bryant

Female Vocalist of the Year

- Lynn Morris
- Suzanne Cox
- Alison Krauss
- Laurie Lewis
- Claire Lynch

Song Of The Year

- "Mama's Hand"
  - Hazel Dickens, songwriter (Lynn Morris)
- "Another Place, Another Time"
  - Jerry Chestnut, songwriter (Ronnie & Rob McCoury)
- "In The Gravel Yard"
  - Malcolm Pulley, songwriter (Blue Highway)
- "Tear My Stillhouse Down"
  - Gillian Welch, songwriter (The Nashville Bluegrass Band)
- "Wing and a Prayer"
  - Kim Williams, Sam Login & Jim Olander, songwriters (David Parmley, Scott Vestal & Continental Divide)

Album of the Year

- It's A Long Long Road - Blue Highway
  - Blue Highway, producer
- Mama's Hand - Lynn Morris
  - Lynn Morris, producer
- One Step Forward - The Lonesome River Band
  - The Lonesome River Band, producer
- Ronnie & Rob McCoury - Ronnie & Rob McCoury
  - Ronnie McCoury, producer
- Unleashed - The Nashville Bluegrass Band
  - Jerry Douglas, producer

Recorded Event of the Year

- Bluegrass '95 - Scott Vestal, Aubrey Haynie, Adam Steffey, Wayne Benson, Barry Bales & Clay Jones
  - David Parmley, producer
- Fiddle And A Song - Byron Berline
  - Byron Berline, producer
- Rose Of Old Kentucky - Byron Berline featuring Vince Gill
  - Byron Berline, producer
- 60 Years of Bluegrass with My Friends - Curly Seckler
  - Billy Henson, producer
- That High Lonesome Sound - Old & In the Way
  - David Grisman, producer

Instrumental Recording of the Year

- Ronnie & Rob McCoury - Ronnie & Rob McCoury
  - Ronnie McCoury, producer
- An American Original - The '94 Sessions - Chubby Wise
  - Sonny Osborne, producer
- Dancing In The Hog Trough - Lynn Morris
  - Lynn Morris, producer
- Southern Comfort - The Lonesome River Band
  - The Lonesome River Band, producer
- Wolves A' Howlin' - Richard Greene & The Grass Is Greener
  - Richard Greene, producer

Gospel Recorded Performance of the Year

- There's A Light Guiding Me - Doyle Lawson & Quicksilver
  - Doyle Lawson, producer
- Glory Train - Southern Rail
  - Bob Dick and Southern Rail, producers
- I Can Call Jesus - Lynn Morris
  - Lynn Morris, producer
- My God Made It All - Bass Mountain Boys
  - Butch Baldassari, producer
- Pathway To Heaven - The McPeak Brothers
  - The McPeak Brothers, producers

Emerging Artist of the Year

- Blue Highway
- Laurel Canyon Ramblers
- Chris Jones & The Night Drivers
- Wyatt Rice & Santa Cruz
- The Sidemen

=== Instrumental Performers of the Year ===
Banjo Player of the Year

- Sammy Shelor
- Scott Vestal
- Ron Block
- J.D. Crowe
- Rob McCoury

Dobro Player of the Year

- Rob Ickes
- Mike Auldridge
- Jerry Douglas
- Sally Van Meter
- Gene Wooten

Bass Player of the Year

- Mike Bub
- Roy Huskey Jr.
- Gene Libbea
- Missy Raines
- Mark Schatz

Fiddle Player of the Year

- Stuart Duncan
- Byron Berline
- Jason Carter
- Alison Krauss
- Chubby Wise

Guitar Player of the Year

- Tony Rice
- David Grier
- Del McCoury
- Larry Sparks
- Doc Watson

Mandolin Player of the Year

- Ronnie McCoury
- Butch Baldassari
- Sam Bush
- Bill Monroe
- Adam Steffey
