= Wyatt Rice =

American songwriter (born 1965)

- Born: January 6, 1965 (age 61); Long Beach, California, United States
- Genres: Bluegrass Music, New Acoustic Music
- Occupation: Musician
- Instrument: Guitar
- Years active: 1984–present
- Labels: Rounder Records, Mountain Fever Records
- Website: wyattrice.com

Wyatt Rice is an American guitarist and bluegrass musician. He is best known for his solo albums and his work in his brother's group the Tony Rice Unit.

== Biography ==
Rice was born in Long Beach, California but grew up in Florida and other locations. He began playing guitar at age six, learning from his father Herb Rice. He also played alto saxophone, bassoon, and bass in his school marching band.

At age 17, Rice moved from Florida to California to be a member of his brother Tony Rice's band, the Tony Rice Unit.

In 1990, Rice released his all-instrumental solo album New Market Gap on the Rounder Records label with help from Rickie Simpkins (fiddle), Sammy Shelor (banjo), Ray Legere (mandolin), and Ron Rice (bass).

Rice formed his own band Santa Cruz in 1995 and in 1996, released the album Picture in a Tear. Personnel included Elmer Burchett (banjo), Ricky Riddle (mandolin), Junior Sisk (guitar), and Timmy Massey (bass).

Rice joined Ronnie Bowman’s band The Committee in 2003 along with Andy Hall (resonator guitar), Jeremy Garrett (fiddle), Jessie Cobb (Mandolin) Mike Anglin (bass) and Garnet Imes Bowman (harmony vocals).

In 2013, Rice began touring with fellow flatpicking guitarist Richard Bennett.

In 2016, Rice and Dan Menzone released the Something Out of the Blue album on the Mountain Fever Records as the Wyatt Rice and Dan Menzone Alliance. Other artists involved include Rob Ickes (dobro), Fred Carpenter (fiddle), Adam Steffey (mandolin), and Ron Rice (bass). Donna Hughes wrote the lead-off song, "Lonesome Highway" which was sung by Russell Moore and Dale Ann Bradley.

Wyatt recorded the music instruction DVD “Advanced Bluegrass Rhythm Guitar” for Flatpicking Guitar Magazine, with Rickie Simpkins, Kenny Smith, Sammy Shelor, and Tony Rice. Rice also operates Rice Recording Studio, and currently serves as an adjunct faculty member at East Tennessee State University, teaching Guitar.

Rice is also a member of the Crooked Road Guitar Masters, along with Claiborne Woodall, Josh Pickett, and Sammy Shelor.

== Discography ==
=== Solo albums ===
- 1990: New Market Gap (Rounder)
- 1996: Picture in a Tear (Rounder) with Santa Cruz

=== With Tony Rice ===
- 1982: Backwaters (Rounder)
- 1983: Church Street Blues (Sugar Hill)
- 1986: Me & My Guitar (Rounder)
- 1991: Native American (Rounder)
- 1996: Tony Rice Sings Gordon Lightfoot (Rounder)
- 2000: Unit of Measure (album) (Rounder)
- 2003: Tony Rice Guitar Method - Instructional Video (Homespun)
- 2014: Tony Rice: The Video Collection'' DVD (Rounder)

=== Larry and Wyatt Rice ===
- 1994: Larry and Wyatt Rice (Pinecastle)

=== The Rice Brothers ===
- 1989: The Rice Brothers (Rounder)
- 1994: The Rice Brothers 2 (Rounder)

=== Wyatt Rice and Rickie Simpkins ===
- 2001: New Acoustic Christmas (FGM)
- 2005: Pickin’ on Martina McBride (CMH)
- 2005: Pickin’ on Vince Gill (CMH)
- 2006: Pickin’ on Van Zant (CMH)

=== Wyatt Rice, David Grier, and Kenny Smith ===
- 2002: Live in Concert DVD (Flatpicking Guitar Magazine)

=== The Dan Menzone and Wyatt Rice Alliance ===
- 2016: Something Out of the Blue (Mountain Fever)

=== Also appears on ===
- 1986: Larry Rice - Hurricanes and Daydreams (Rebel)
- 1989: Bill Emerson and Pete Goble - Dixie in My Eye (Webco)
- 1990: Larry Rice - Artesia (Rebel)
- 1990: Once Again From the Top Volumes One and Two (Hay Holler Records)
- 1991: Bill Emerson - Reunion (Pinecastle)
- 1991: David Grier - Freewheeling (Rounder)
- 1994: Emerson and Taylor - Appaloosa (Pinecastle)
- 1996: Bill Emerson - Banjo Man (Pinecastle)
- 1997: Rickie Simpkins - Dancing on the Fingerboard (Pinecastle)
- 2002: Rickie Simpkins - Don't Fret It (Doobie Shea)
- 2004: Melonie Cannon - Melonie Cannon (Skaggs Family)
- 2005: Ronnie Bowman - It's Gettin' Better All the Time (Koch)
- 2005: Larry Rice - Clouds Over Carolina (Rebel)
- 2006: Jimmy Gaudreau - In Good Company (CMH)
- 2007: Donna Hughes - Gaining Wisdom (Rounder)
- 2007: Steep Canyon Rangers - Lovin' Pretty Women (Rebel)
- 2008: Melonie Cannon - And the Wheel Turns (Rural Rhythm)
- 2008: Tim Hensley - Long Monday (Rural Rhythm)
- 2008: Junior Sisk - Blue Side of the Blue Ridge (Rebel)
- 2012: Alan Bibey and Wayne Benson - The Mandolin Chronicles (Pinecastle)
- 2017: Mike Bentley - All I've Got (Union House)

=== Music Instruction ===
- 2000: Advanced Bluegrass Rhythm Guitar DVD (Flatpicking Guitar Magazine)

=== Awards ===
- IBMA Instrumental Group of the Year – The Tony Rice Unit – 1991, 1995
- IBMA Recorded Event of the Year award for "What'll I Do" - Terry Baucom - 2013.
