= Junior Sisk =

- Birth name: Harry Carpenter Sisk, Jr.
- Born: November 6, 1964 (age 60) Arlington, Virginia, United States
- Genres: Bluegrass music
- Occupation: Musician
- Instruments: Guitar, bass, 1975 Martin D-35 (named "Sally")
- Years active: 1995–present
- Labels: Rebel Records, Mountain Fever Records
- Website: juniorsisk.us

Harry Carpenter "Junior" Sisk Jr. is an American guitarist and vocalist in the bluegrass tradition, best known for his work with his band Rambler's Choice. He cites the hard-driving bluegrass of the Stanley Brothers as a major influence on his approach to bluegrass music.

== Biography ==
=== Early years ===
Sisk was born in Arlington but was raised in Ferrum, Virginia. His early interest in music was sparked by his father Harry Sisk Sr., who wrote songs and played guitar, and his mother who sang. When Sisk was 14, his parents gifted him with an upright bass. Sisk began performing in local bands at age 16, first playing bass but eventually switching to guitar. He also played in his family's band Dreamin' Creek with his father and cousins.

=== Music career ===
In the early 1990s, Sisk wrote songs made popular by the Lonesome River Band, such as "A Game (I Can't Win)," "My Heart Belongs to You," and "Tears Are Blinding Me." Playing bluegrass every Saturday at Partners II bar in Centreville, Virginia, he met many other bluegrass musicians, such as Del McCoury, the Johnson Mountain Boys, and the Bluegrass Cardinals.

In 1995, Sisk and his cousin songwriter Tim Massey began playing with Wyatt Rice and Santa Cruz, which also included Elmer Burchett (banjo) and Ricky Riddle (mandolin). They released the album Picture in a Tear in 1996.

Sisk formed Rambler's Choice in 1998. Besides Sisk, the band included Massey, Elmer Burchett, Jimmy VanCleve, and Allan Perdue. Rambler's Choice released the album Sounds of the Mountains on Rounder Records, but dissolved in 2001.

In 2001, Sisk worked with the band Lost and Found, then in 2002, he joined Baucom, Bibey and BlueRidge. BlueRidge toured extensively and recorded three albums, and disbanded in 2006 because Bibey wanted to join Grasstowne.

In 2007, Sisk re-formed Rambler's Choice with Massey, Darrell Wilkerson (banjo), Chris Harris (mandolin), and Billy Hawks (fiddle) and in 2008, they released the album Blue Side of the Blue Ridge on Rebel Records. The album contained original and traditional songs, and was produced by Ronnie Bowman.

Sisk and Ramblers Choice released Heartaches and Dreams in 2010, then in 2011 released The Heart of a Song which contained the popular song "A Far Cry From Lester and Earl" and climbed the bluegrass charts.

In 2013, Sisk released the album The Story of the Day That I Died with Ramblers Choice, and also in 2013, released Hall of Fame Bluegrass, an album of duets with banjoist Joe Mullins. They selected songs from first and second-generation bluegrass artists that have rarely been covered or heard.

In 2017, Sisk released the album The Mountains Are Calling Me Home on the Mountain Fever label. The current lineup of Ramblers Choice includes Sisk, Jason Davis (banjo), Johnathan Dillon (mandolin), Jamie Harper (fiddle), and Kameron Keller (bass).

Sisk has also worked with Ralph Stanley, Dave Evans, and Del McCoury.

=== Awards ===
In 2012, Sisk won the International Bluegrass Music Association (IBMA) award for Song of the Year for "A Far Cry from Lester and Earl," and he also won Album of the Year for The Heart of a Song. In 2013, he won the IBMA award for Male Vocalist of the Year, and in 2016, he won the award for Recorded Event of the Year for The song "Longneck Blues" (with Ronnie Bowman).

In 2013, Ramblers Choice won the Society for the Preservation of Bluegrass Music of America (SPBGMA) Bluegrass Band of the Year award.

== Discography ==
=== Junior Sisk and Rambler's Choice ===
- 1998: Sounds of the Mountains (Rounder)
- 2008: Blue Side of the Blue Ridge (Rebel)
- 2010: Heartaches and Dreams (Rebel)
- 2011: The Heart of a Song (Rebel)
- 2013: The Story of the Day That I Died (Rebel)
- 2014: Trouble Follows Me (Rebel)
- 2016: Poor Boy's Pleasure (Mountain Fever)
- 2017: The Mountains Are Calling Me Home (Mountain Fever)

=== Wyatt Rice and Santa Cruz ===
- 1996: Picture in a Tear (Rounder)

=== Lost and Found ===
- 2002: It's About Time (Rebel)

=== BlueRidge ===
- 2002: Come Along With Me (Sugar Hill) as Baucom, Bibey & BlueRidge
- 2004: Side by Side (Sugar Hill)
- 2006: Gettin' Ready (Pinecastle)

=== Junior Sisk and Joe Mullins ===
- 2013: Hall of Fame Bluegrass (Rebel)

=== Junior Sisk ===
- 2018: Brand New Shade of Blue (Mountain Fever)
- 2020: Just Load the Wagon (Mountain Fever)

=== Also appears on ===
- 1997: Sammy Shelor - Leading Roll (Sugar Hill)
- 2009: various artists - Born Into Bluegrass: The Songs of Cullen Galyean (Mountain Roads)
- 2017: Mac Wiseman - I Sang the Song (Mountain Fever)
