= Mountain Fever Records =

- Founded: 2006
- Founder: Mark Hodges
- Distributor: Syntax Creative
- Genre: Bluegrass
- Country of origin: U.S.
- Location: Willis, Virginia
- Official website: mountainfever.com

Mountain Fever Records is a record label based in Willis, Virginia specializing primarily in bluegrass music.

== History ==
The label was established by Mark Hodges, a Floyd County, Virginia native. He opened the Something To Do Video store, which he turned into a successful chain of stores. As a hobby, he began to record his musician friends when they would visit, and he turned this hobby into a stand-alone 72-track recording studio, and then the record label.

Sammy Shelor of the Lonesome River Band and Aaron Ramsey of Mountain Heart have engineered and mastered Mountain Fever projects.

=== Notable projects ===
In 2017, Mountain Fever Records released the Mac Wiseman album I Sang the Song (Life of the Voice with a Heart) featuring contributions from John Prine, Alison Krauss, Sierra Hull, Junior Sisk, Shawn Camp, and Andrea Zonn.

=== Travianna Records ===
Travianna Records is a child label for releasing Americana music. After Jack, Ash Breeze, Pi Jacobs, and Tara Dente are among the Travianna Records artists. The label was named after the late Samuel A’Court's communal farm Travianna in Floyd County.

== Artists ==
Here is a partial list of artists who have released recordings on the Mountain Fever label.

- Dave Adkins
- Adkins & Loudermilk
- Alan Bibey and Grasstowne
- Ashlee Blankenship and Blades of Blue
- The Bluegrass Brothers
- Breaking Grass
- Summer Brooke and Mountain Faith
- Rachel Burge and Blue Dawning
- The Churchmen
- Amanda Cook
- Kristy Cox
- Crowe Brothers
- Jason Davis
- The Deer Creek Boys
- Delta Reign
- Detour
- Gold Heart Sisters
- Heidi and Ryan (Greer)
- Hammertowne
- Jackson Hollow
- Jett’s Creek
- Thomm Jutz
- Irene Kelley
- Nothin' Fancy
- Wyatt Rice
- The Wyatt Rice and Dan Menzone Alliance
- Kevin Richardson and Cuttin' Edge
- Sideline
- Junior Sisk and Rambler's Choice
- The Spinney Brothers
- Statement
- Stevens Family
- Sweet Potato Pie
- Volume Five
- Darrell Webb Band
- Mac Wiseman

== See also ==
- List of record labels
