= Butch Robins =

- Born: Joseph Calvin Robins; May 12, 1949 (age 77); Lebanon, Virginia
- Genres: Alternative; Adult Contemporary; Instrumental; Bluegrass
- Occupation: Musician
- Instrument: Banjo
- Years active: 1969–present
- Label: Rounder

Joseph Calvin "Butch" Robins (born May 12, 1949, in Lebanon, Russell County, Virginia) is an American five-string–banjo player.

== Biography ==
Robins was one of the longest-tenured banjoists for Bill Monroe and The Blue Grass Boys, and bassist for the New Grass Revival, earning him the distinction of being "the one and only New Grass/Blue Grass Boy."

=== Early years ===
As a student of music and the banjo in the 1960s and '70s, Robins acquainted himself with and befriended many of the first generation bluegrass musicians at early festivals and fiddlers' conventions.

As a teenager, he won major banjo contests and participated in banjo workshops at the 1969 Newport Folk Festival and at Carlton Haney's 1969 Camp Springs Bluegrass Festival, in Reidsville, North Carolina.

Upon his graduation from Dublin (Virginia) High School in 1967, Robins was offered a job playing the banjo for Bill Monroe and The Blue Grass Boys, which he accepted. After participating in the first annual Bean Blossom Blue Grass Festival in Indiana, he was disillusioned over working conditions, scantily paid and a long way from home. He left the band and returned to Virginia.

While serving in the United States Army in Columbia, South Carolina (1969 - 1971), Robins was introduced to Snuffy Jenkins & Pappy Sherrill. He later dedicated his first solo album, Forty Years Late, to Snuffy.

=== 1970s group and solo ===
In the 1970s, Robins performed in a number of bands, including Charlie Moore, Jim & Jesse, Wilma Lee & Stoney Cooper, and the New Grass Revival. During these years, he explored various banjo techniques, and helped lay the groundwork for the progressive, melodic, five-string banjo playing of today. As a self-produced solo recording artist with interest in and attention to ensemble sound, Robins released three landmark albums with Rounder Records: Forty Years Late, Fragments of My Imagination, and The Fifth Child.

=== Bill Monroe and the Blue Grass Boys ===
From 1977 until 1981, Robins played banjo for Bill Monroe and his Blue Grass Boys, performing throughout the United States, including the White House and Lincoln Center in New York City.

=== The Bluegrass Band ===
Robins formed the Bluegrass Band in 1972; it was disbanded one year later. The band started up again in 1989, this time with members Wayne Henderson (guitar), Ronnie Simpkins (bass), Wyatt Rice (guitar), Arnie Solomon (mandolin), Robins (banjo), Rickie Simpkins (violin, mandolin, vocals), and Larry Stephenson (mandolin, vocals).

=== Hay Holler Records ===
Robins launched the Hay Holler record label, and the Bluegrass Band recorded four albums that were sold via telemarketing: Once Again From the Top volumes 1 and 2 were traditional bluegrass, and Shine Hallelujah Shine volumes 1 and 2 were traditional gospel.

=== Grounded-Centered-Focused ===
In 1995, Robins produced a masterpiece banjo-oriented bluegrass recording, Grounded-Centered-Focused, featuring a talented supporting cast, including Bill Monroe.

=== The World International Blue Grass Band ===
As a result of traveling to and performing in Japan, Australia and Europe, Robins recruited some of the world's finest bluegrass musicians into the World International Blue Grass Band in 2007 as "a musical statement of international cooperation and goodwill." This band toured Virginia before performing at the International Bluegrass Music Association (IBMA) Convention in Nashville, Tennessee, and recording a live TV performance on Song of the Mountains for the Public Broadcasting Service (PBS).

=== Autobiography ===
Robins's autobiography What I Know 'Bout What I Know earned positive reviews and a nomination for IBMA's Print Media Personality of the Year award in 2004.

=== Music instruction ===
Butch has also been an instructor at several camps, including the Tennessee Banjo Institute, Jack Hatfield's Smoky Mountain Banjo Academy, Midwest Banjo Camp, Augusta Heritage Center, and Camp Ausgrass in Australia.

=== Bluegrass Videos ===
In 2013, Butch recorded a series of videos for Radford University entitled "Butch Robins Presents- Blue Grass Music, its Origin and Development as a Unique and Creative Art Form." In this five-part video series, Robins explains the fascinating history of bluegrass music, using recorded and live music to set and illustrate the timeline, relate real-life anecdotes from the musicians involved, and relate personal stories of his life and relationship with Bill Monroe. He draws on his relationship with Monroe and other musicians to provide a unique perspective.

=== Awards ===
On September 24, 2016, Butch Robins was inducted into the Bill Monroe Bluegrass Hall of Fame in Bean Blossom, Indiana.

In 2020, Butch Robins was inducted into the IBMA Hall of Fame as a member of The New Grass Revival

== Discography ==
=== Solo albums ===
- 1977: Forty Years Late (Rounder)
- 1978: Fragments Of My Imagicnation (Rounder)
- 1980: The Fifth Child (Rounder)
- 1990: "The Bluegrass Band - Once Again From The Top" (Hay Holler)
- 1991: "The Bluegrass Band - Shine Hallelujah Shine" (Hay Holler)
- 1991: "The Bluegrass Band - 2nd Cut" (Hay Holler)
- 1995: "Grounded Centered Focused" (Hay Holler)

=== With Kenny Baker ===
- 1971: "A Baker's Dozen" (County)

=== With Leon Russell ===
- 1973: "Hank Wilson's Back" (Shelter)

=== With Norman Blake and others ===
- 1975: "Norman Blake/Tut Taylor/Sam Bush/Butch Robins/Vassar Clements/David Holland/Jethro Burns" (HDS)

=== With the Clinch Mountain Clan ===
- 1976: "Wilma Lee & Stoney Cooper" (Rounder)

=== With Bill Monroe ===
- 1981: "Master of Bluegrass" (MCA)

=== With New Grass Revival ===
- 2005: "Grass Roots: The Best of New Grass Revival" (Capitol)
