= The Bluegrass Album (Alan Jackson album) =

Studio album by Alan Jackson
- Released: September 24, 2013
- Genre: Bluegrass; country
- Label: Alan's Country Records; EMI Nashville
- Producer: Keith Stegall; Adam Wright

Alan Jackson chronology
Precious Memories Volume II (2013)	The Bluegrass Album (2013)	Angels and Alcohol (2015)

Professional ratings
Review scores
Source	Rating
AllMusic	3.5/5 stars

The Bluegrass Album is the nineteenth studio album and the first bluegrass album by American country music artist Alan Jackson. It was released on September 24, 2013 via Alan's Country Records and EMI Nashville. Jackson wrote eight songs for the album. It also includes covers of The Dillards' "There Is a Time", John Anderson's "Wild and Blue" and Bill Monroe's "Blue Moon of Kentucky". Also included is a re-recording of "Let's Get Back to Me and You" from his 1994 album Who I Am, marking the second time Jackson has included two versions of the same song on two different albums ("A Woman's Love" was originally recorded for High Mileage and was later re-recorded for Like Red on a Rose).

The album was produced by Keith Stegall and Jackson's nephew, Adam Wright (of The Wrights). It was recorded in Nashville.

"Blue Ridge Mountain Song" was released as a single in advance of the album's release. "Blacktop" was also released as a single. Both songs feature music videos. The music video for "Blue Ridge Mountain Song" stars Jackson’s middle daughter, Ali, as the lead role.

== Commercial performance ==
The album debuted at No. 11 on Billboard 200, No. 1 on Bluegrass Albums, and No. 3 on Top Country Albums, selling 22,000 copies in its first week. It also finished at No. 2 on the Year End Bluegrass Albums chart for 2014. It has sold 148,000 copies in the United States as of June 2015.

== Track listing ==
All tracks are written by Alan Jackson except where noted.

No.	Title	Writer(s)	Length
1.	"Long Hard Road"		6:28
2.	"Mary"		4:21
3.	"Wild and Blue"	John Scott Sherrill	4:10
4.	"Appalachian Mountain Girl"		4:46
5.	"Ain't Got Trouble Now"	Adam Wright	2:54
6.	"Blue Ridge Mountain Song"		5:36
7.	"Tie Me Down"		3:34
8.	"There Is a Time"	Rodney Dillard, Mitch Jayne	3:23
9.	"Blue Side of Heaven"		4:41
10.	"Let's Get Back to Me and You"		2:44
11.	"Way Beyond the Blue"	Mark D. Sanders, Randy Albright, Lisa Silver	6:19
12.	"Knew All Along"	A. Wright, Shannon Wright	4:05
13.	"Blacktop"		3:33
14.	"Blue Moon of Kentucky"	Bill Monroe	5:42
Total length:			62:16

== Personnel ==
- Ronnie Bowman - background vocals
- Scott Coney - acoustic guitar
- Tim Crouch - fiddle
- Tim Dishman - upright bass
- Rob Ickes - dobro
- Alan Jackson - lead vocals
- Don Rigsby - background vocals
- Sammy Shelor - banjo
- Adam Steffey - mandolin
- John Kelton - engineer and mixing
- Travis Humbert - assistant engineer and cover artwork

== Charts ==
=== Weekly charts ===
Chart (2013)	Peak position
Australian Albums (ARIA)	18
US Billboard 200	11
US Top Bluegrass Albums (Billboard)	1
US Top Country Albums (Billboard)	3

=== Year-end charts ===
Chart (2013)	Position
US Top Bluegrass Albums (Billboard)	2
US Top Country Albums (Billboard)	55

Chart (2014)	Position
US Top Bluegrass Albums (Billboard)	2

Chart (2015)	Position
US Top Bluegrass Albums (Billboard)	11
