= Sammy Shelor =

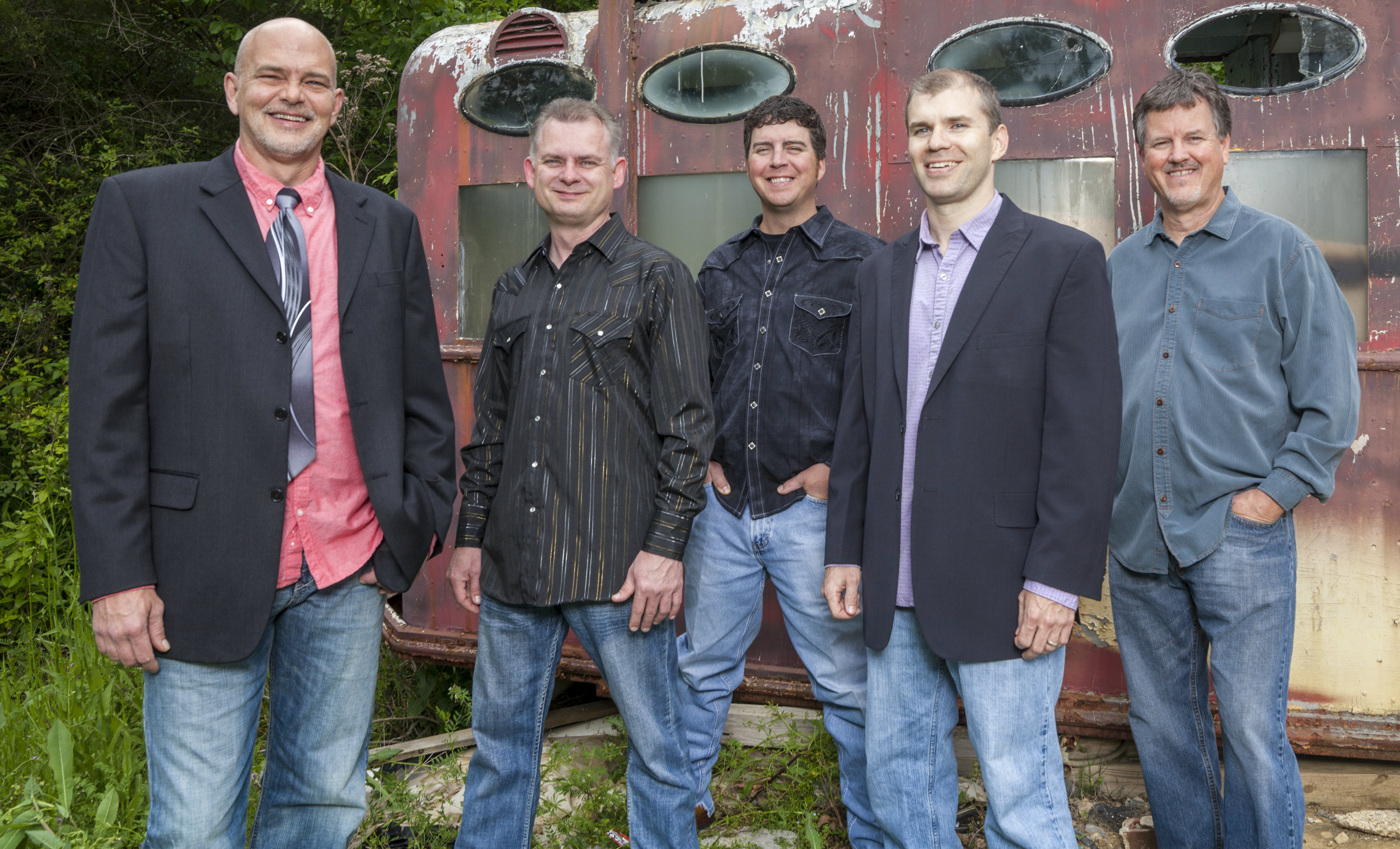
- Shelor (left) in the Lonesome River Band, 2014

Background information
- Born: October 10, 1962 (age 64); Meadows of Dan, Virginia
- Genre: Bluegrass music
- Occupation: Musician
- Instruments: Banjo, guitar, 1941 Gibson TB-75 flathead banjo
- Years active: 1984–present
- Member of: Lonesome River Band
- Website: sammyshelor.com

Sammy Shelor is an American banjoist in the bluegrass tradition. He is best known as leader of the Lonesome River Band and for his solo recordings, music instruction, and session work.

== Biography ==
=== Early years ===
The Shelor Family has a long banjo tradition. Charlie Poole taught Shelor’s grandfather the banjo, and Shelor’s grandfather in turn taught Shelor. When Shelor was four years old, growing up in southwestern Virginia, his grandfather fashioned a banjo for him from an old pressure cooker lid. His other grandfather promised to buy Shelor a real banjo if he learned to play two songs. Sam met the challenge, his grandfather bought him a Ventura banjo, and by age 10 Shelor was performing in local bands.

Shelor patterned his playing and career after J. D. Crowe, Earl Scruggs, and Sonny Osborne of The Osborne Brothers.

Shelor became a full time professional musician when he joined Richmond, Virginia-based The Heights Of Grass at age 19. That band eventually morphed into The Virginia Squires, featuring Rickie and Ronnie Simpkins. Shelor played six years with the band. The Virginia Squires reunited for one show in 2017.

=== Lonesome River Band ===
Shelor joined the Lonesome River Band in 1990. When founder Tim Austin left in 1995, Shelor and Ronnie Bowman took over management of the band. Shelor became manager after Bowman's departure in 2000.

=== Solo recording ===
In 1997, Shelor released a solo album Leading Roll on the Sugar Hill label. Guest artists included Tony Rice, Jerry Douglas, Sam Bush, and Alan O'Bryant.

=== Awards ===
Shelor has received the following recognition:

- 2001: International Bluegrass Music Association (IBMA) Instrumental Album Of The Year award for his involvement in Knee Deep In Bluegrass on Rebel Records.
- 2009: inducted in to the Virginia Country Music Hall of Fame.
- 1995, 1996, 1997, 1998, and 2012: IBMA Banjo Performer of the Year award.
- 1999, 2002, 2004, 2014: Society for the Preservation of Bluegrass Music of America (SPBGMA) Banjo Performer of the Year award.
- 2011: Award for the Steve Martin Prize for Excellence in Banjo and Bluegrass.

=== Music instruction ===
Shelor and AcuTab have published books and instructional DVDs.

=== Instruments ===
- Huber Banjos designed and produced a Sammy Shelor signature model banjo.

=== Personal life ===
Shelor and his wife Jordyn have two children.

== Discography ==
=== Solo albums ===
- 1997: Leading Roll (Sugar Hill)

=== Linda Lay and Sammy Shelor ===
- Taking the Crooked Road Home (Virginia Folklife program, Crooked Road series)

=== With the Virginia Squires ===
- 1984: Bluegrass With a Touch of Class (self-released)
- 1984: Mountains and Memories (Rebel)
- 1985: I'm Working My Way (Rebel)
- 1986: Hard Times and Heartaches (Rebel)
- 1988: Variations (Rebel)

=== With the Lonesome River Band ===
- 1991: Carrying the Tradition (Rebel)
- 1994: Old Country Town (Sugar Hill)
- 1998: Finding The Way (Sugar Hill)
- 2000: Talkin' To Myself (Sugar Hill)
- 2002: Window Of Time (Doobie Shea)
- 2005: Head On Into Heartache (Mountain Home)
- 2006: The Road With No End (Mountain Home)
- 2008: No Turning Back (Rural Rhythm)
- 2010: Still Learning (Rural Rhythm)
- 2014: Turn On A Dime (Mountain Home)
- 2015: Coming Back Home To You (Mountain Home)
- 2016: Bridging The Tradition (Mountain Home)
- 2017: Mayhayley's House (Mountain Home)
- 2019: Outside Looking In (Mountain Home)
- 2021: "Singing Up There: A Tribute to the Easter Brothers" (Mountain Home)
- 2022: "Heyday" (Mountain Home)

=== As producer ===
- 2012: Acoustic Blue - Being Country (Mountain Fever)

=== Also appears on ===
- 1986: Larry Rice - Hurricanes and Daydreams (Rebel)
- 1988: Larry Stephenson - Everytime I Sing a Love Song (Pinecastle)
- 1989: Wyatt Rice - New Market Gap (Rounder)
- 1990: Larry Rice - Artesia (Rebel)
- 1993: Larry Stephenson - Wash My Blues Away (Pinecastle)
- 1994: Ronnie Bowman - Cold Virginia Night (Rebel)
- 1995: Butch Robins - Grounded Centered Focused (Hay Holler)
- 1997: Kenny Smith - Studebaker (Sugar Hill)
- 1997: Rickie Simpkins - Dancing on the Fingerboard (Pinecastle)
- 1998: Ronnie Bowman - The Man I'm Tryin to Be (Sugar Hill)
- 1998: Exit Thirteen - Wind on My Back (Freeland)
- 1998: Mark Newton - Living A Dream (Rebel)
- 1998: Don Rigsby - A Vision (Sugar Hill)
- 1998: Suzanne Thomas - Dear Friends & Gentle Hearts (Rounder)
- 1998: Robin and Linda Williams - Devil of a Dream (Sugar Hill)
- 2000: Don Rigsby - Empty Old Mailbox (Sugar Hill)
- 2000: Alan Bibey - In The Blue Room (Sugar Hill)
- 2001: The Country Gentlemen - Crying in the Chapel (Freeland)
- 2001: Maro Kawabata - Carolina Blue - (Copper Creek)
- 2001: Ron Stewart - Time Stands Still (Rounder)
- 2001: Josh Williams - Now That You're Gone (Pinecastle)
- 2005: Larry Rice - Clouds Over Carolina (Rebel)
- 2006: Jimmy Gaudreau - In Good Company (CMH)
- 2006: Patrick McAvinue - Grave Run (Patuxent Music)
- 2010: Common Strings - Somewhere in Glory (Rural Rhythm)
- 2010: Bobby Osborne & the Rocky Top X-Press - Memories - Celebrating Bobby's 60th Anniversary As A Professional Entertainer (Rural Rhythm)
- 2013: Alan Jackson - The Bluegrass Album (EMI Nashville)
- 2014: Darrell Webb Band - Dream Big (Mountain Fever)

=== Music instruction ===
- 1995: AcuTab Transcriptions Vol. I (Acutab)
- 1995: AcuTab Transcriptions Vol. 2 (Acutab)
- 2001 Knee Deep in Banjo book (Acutab)
- 2011: Sammy Shelor: A Demonstration & Analysis of an Award Winning Style DVD, streaming (Acutab)
