= Shelor Family =

American folk music group

From top-left clockwise: Pyrus Shelor, Jesse Shelor, Clarice Shelor, and Joe Blackard

The Shelor Family (also known as Dad Blackard's Moonshiners) was an American folk music group formed in Meadows of Dan, Virginia in the 1920s. Their music, which was recorded during the Bristol sessions in 1927, had a profound impact on country and bluegrass music. The original family band included Joe Blackard (banjo, vocals), his daughter Clarice (piano, vocals), Jesse Shelor (fiddle, vocals) and Pyrhus Shelor (fiddle), and later resurfaced on an album of field recordings arranged in 1975.

== History ==
Born in December 1894, Jesse Shelor began playing the fiddle at ten years-old under the tutelage of the regionally popular musician Wallace Spangler. Spangler’s two sons Tump and Babe were also fiddle players, and Babe appears on the County compilation album The Old-Time Virginia Fiddlers. In 1917, Jesse Shelor was drafted into the armed forces during the First World War, but was discharged after most of his division was wiped out by the Spanish influenza. He renewed his music career with his mentor Spangler and married Joe Blackard's daughter, Clarice, in 1919. Working as a mailman and playing banjo on the side, Blackard offered the songs "Young Beichan", "The Holy Twig", "Fine Sally", and "Bow and Balance to Me" to writer Cecil Sharp for his book English Folk Songs from the Southern Appalachians in 1918. Like the Shelor family, the Blackard family included several musicians including bluegrass fiddlers Delmar and Buddy Pendleton.

In the 1920s, Jesse and Pyrus Shelor joined Joe and Clarice Blackard to perform under the name "The Shelor Family" for dances and other social functions. While on the lookout for new artists, record producer Ralph Peer took the advice of Ernest Stoneman, and traveled to Bristol, then a crossroads for folk musicians. Although the initial response was lackluster at best, musicians soon came in droves, including the Shelor Family, to record for Peer when Stoneman revealed he was being paid $50 per side. On August 2, 1927, the group, along with Jesse and Clarice Shelor's seven-year-old son Joseph holding sheet music, recorded the songs "Sandy River Belle", "Big Ben Gal" (incorrectly labeled Big Bend Gal), "Billy Grimes the Rover", and "Suzanna Gal" at a millinery shop. Released under the name Dad Blackard's Moonshiners, the four sides are a part of the Bristol sessions, which had a significant impact on future waves of country and bluegrass musicians.

Even though the Shelor Family was offered the opportunity to record again, the group never returned, but the family and the generations that followed continued to stay involved in music both professionally and semi-professionally. Among the most successful performers of the Shelor Family is Sammy Shelor, who leads the commercially successful bluegrass band Lonesome River Band. In 2009, Field Recorders' Collective released an album of material performed by descendants of Jesse and Clarice Shelor, recorded by Ray Alden in 1975.
