= Ray Legere =

Canadian musician

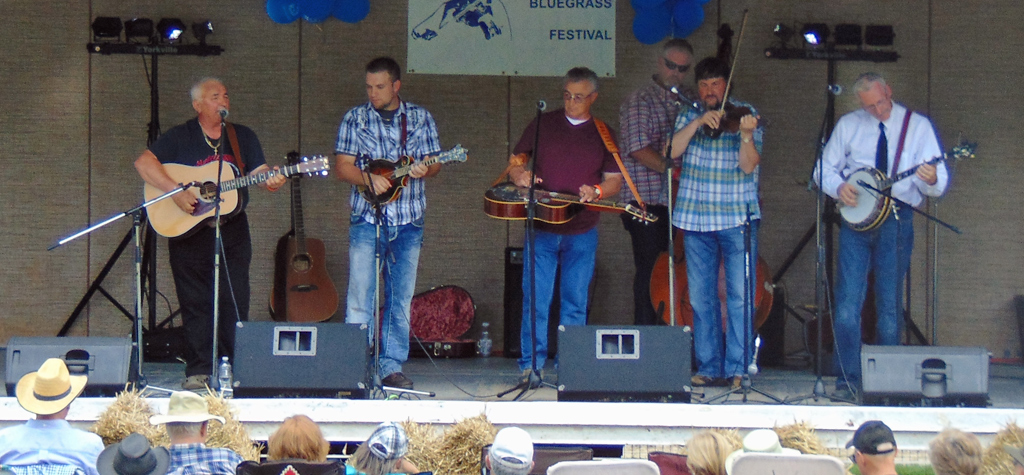
- Ray Legere and his band Acoustic Horizon on stage at the 2015 Tottenham Bluegrass Festival

Background information
- Born: Ray Legere; September 20, 1965 (age 61); Amherst, Nova Scotia
- Genres: Bluegrass, Country music
- Occupations: Musician, composer
- Instruments: fiddle, mandolin, guitar
- Years active: 1972–present

Ray Legere (born September 20, 1965) is a Canadian bluegrass fiddler, mandolinist, guitarist and band leader from Sackville, New Brunswick.

Legere has been named the Bluegrass Artist of the Year at the East Coast Music Awards for several years and is recorded on the Honour Roll at the Central Canadian Bluegrass Awards as the best Fiddle Player, after winning that title from 1996 to 2000. He has been inducted into the New Brunswick Country Music Hall of Fame and the Nova Scotia Country Music Hall of Fame. In 2019, he was awarded the Lieutenant-Governor's Award for High Achievement in the Arts by the New Brunswick Arts Board.

== Early life ==
Raymond (Ray) Legere was born September 20, 1965, in Amherst, Nova Scotia. His mother was a pianist and his father, who played fiddle and banjo, taught him to play the mandolin when he was ten years old. His focus at this time was old-time fiddle tunes, later learning some Louvin Brothers' songs with older friends and listening to American bluegrass pickers.

In the summer of 1982, when he was sixteen, Legere was called unexpectedly to fill in for Bill Monroe of the Blue Grass Boys when the famous mandolinist became ill before a concert in Bridgewater, Nova Scotia. Legere saw this as a unique opportunity to play with fiddle player Kenny Baker and with the Blue Grass Boys. He also learned the valuable lesson that the show must go on when Monroe returned to the stage to perform a few hours after his surgery.

== Career ==
As a young man, Legere played in the Mountain Meadow Bluegrass Band in the late 1970s. In 1987, he joined the Lonesome River Band.

In 1990, Legere played fiddle on the album The Lynn Morris Band. In 1992, he toured with Michelle Shocked.

In 1998, Larry LeBlanc of Billboard magazine named him as one of Canada's leading bluegrass musicians. In 2012, he performed at the Canso Stanfest.

Legere joined the Celtic fusion ensemble Bowfire, and recorded on their self-titled CD, which was released in 2003. He toured with this group for several years.

In 2014, Legere played mandolin on Jared Lutes' album A Matter of When and played fiddle on the album Bill Emerson and the Sweet Dixie Band. His band, Acoustic Horizon, performed at the 2015 Tottenham Bluegrass Festival. Legere also performed in the third video of the United Breaks Guitars trilogy.

Legere performed with the band Grasstic Measures on the 2016 festival circuit; that year he was also inducted into the New Brunswick Country Hall of Fame.

== Discography ==
=== Raymond Legere ===
- 1991: The Common Denominator (Acoustic Horizon AHM 1015)
- 1993: Back Against the Wind (Acoustic Horizon AHM 1016)
- 1993: Maritime Fiddle Session with guest pianist Kimberley Holmes (Acoustic Horizon AHM 1017)
- 1999: Squirrelly Moves (EMI Canada E21Y 20091)
- 2002: Bluegrass in the Backwoods (Acoustic Horizon AHM 1019)
- 2006: Ready to Jam (Acoustic Horizon AHM)
- 2015: Southern Fiddling in the Kenny Baker Style

=== Brakin’ Tradition ===
- 1992: Music Man (Brakin’ BTCD 001)
- 1992: Powerfolk (Brakin’ BTCD 002)
- 1996:Presence in the Past (Brakin’ BTCD 003)

=== Ray Legere and Roger Williams ===
- 1994: A Decade Later (Acoustic Horizon AMH 1018)
- 1996: River of No Return (Strictly Country SCR 47)

=== Dick Smith, Mike O’Reilly Band ===
- 1998: Dick Smith, Mike O’Reilly Band (New Era NE-CD 100)
- 2004: A Honky-Tonk Frame of Mind (New Era NE-CD 200)
- 2005: Life's Road (New Era NE-CD 300)

=== Bowfire ===
- 2003: Bowfire (Marquis Records)

=== Ray Legere and Mike O’Reilly ===
- 2011: Story Songs and Toe-tapping Tunes (Acoustic Horizon AHM)

=== Grasstic Measures ===
- 2016: Square Dance Town (GM 2016–1)

=== Also appears on ===
- 1990: Lynn Morris Band – with Lynn Morris
- 1990: Newmarket Gap, with Wyatt Rice
- 1995: The Young Mando Monsters Mandolin Artistry, Vol. 1 (VMP-CD0100, 1995) / Raymond Legere – Puddle Jumper and Cruisin’ the Autobahn.
- 1996: The Stanley Tradition: Tribute to A Bluegrass Legacy (Doobie Shea Records – DS-CD-1001) / Ray Legere – Gonna Paint the Town
- 2003: "The Time's Never Been Better", a singer/songwriter album by Pat Moore of Ottawa Canada, also featuring Dick Smith, Steve Pittico, Ken Kanwisher, Mike O'Reilly, Tracy Brown, Marty McTiernan and produced by Al Bragg
- 2004: Blue Roses – with Rita MacNeil
- 2007: Bill Emerson and the Sweet Dixie Band – with Bill Emerson/ Ray Legere – Fiddler's Green and There's no room in your heart (Rebel Records)
- 2014: A Matter of When – with Jared Lutes
- 2014:Drop Forge – with Jim Dorrie (2014)

== Awards and honours ==
- 1983 – Winner – Open Mandolin Championship – Woodstock Ontario
- 1986 – Winner – Open Mandolin Championship – Winfield, Kansas
- 1989 – Winner – Old Time Fiddle Championship – Sackville, New Brunswick
- 1990 – Among the top ten – Nashville's Grand Masters Fiddle Championship
- 1990 – Among the top ten – Grand Masters Fiddle Championships – Nepean, Ontario
- 1991 – Among the top ten – Grand Masters Fiddle Championships – Nepean, Ontario
- 1996 – Bluegrass Artist of the year – Eastern Canadian Bluegrass Music Awards
- 1996 – Bluegrass Artist of the Year – East Coast Music Awards
- 2003 – Bluegrass Artist of the Year – Eastern Canadian Bluegrass Music Awards
- 2003 – Bluegrass Artist of the Year – East Coast Music Awards
- 2016 – Inducted into the New Brunswick Country Music Hall of Fame
- 2019 – Masters – Best Fiddle Player – Central Canadian Bluegrass Awards
- 2019 – Inducted into the Nova Scotia Country Music Hall of Fame
- 2019 – High Achievement in the Arts – Lieutenant Governor's Award

Legere is a five-time winner of the Eastern Division Bluegrass Awards in the categories of Mandolin and Fiddle Player of the Year, and has been honored with a Masters Award for each.
