= Rickie Simpkins =

American singer-songwriter (born 1955)

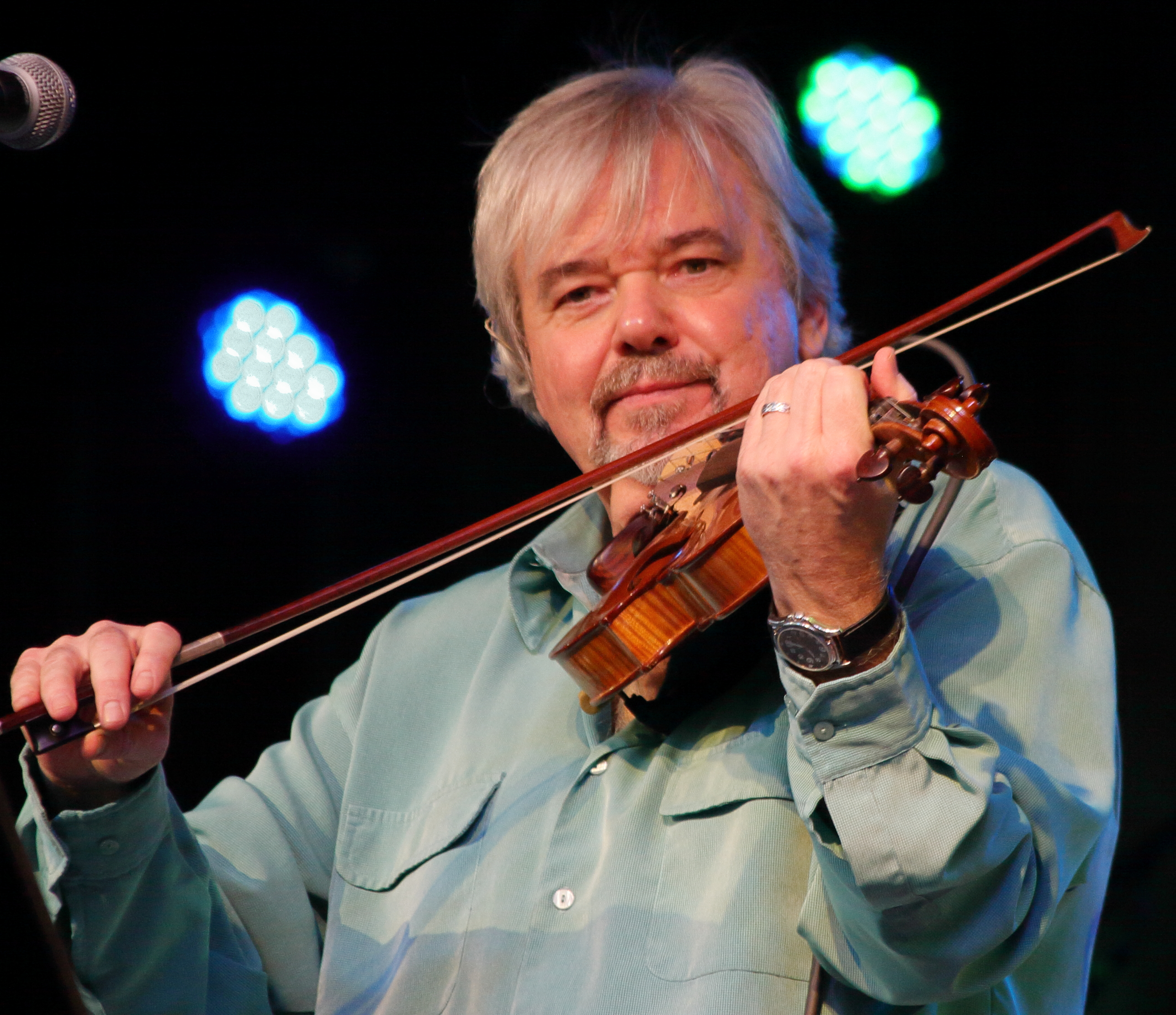
- Performing at MerleFest in 2009

Background information
- Born: Rickie Hal Simpkins; March 10, 1955 (age 71); Montgomery County, Virginia, U.S.
- Genres: Bluegrass music
- Occupation: Musician
- Instruments: Violin, mandolin
- Years active: 1979–present
- Labels: Pinecastle, Doobie Shea

Rickie Hal Simpkins is an American fiddler and mandolinist in the bluegrass tradition. He is best known for his solo albums and his work with the Lonesome River Band and the Seldom Scene.

== Biography ==
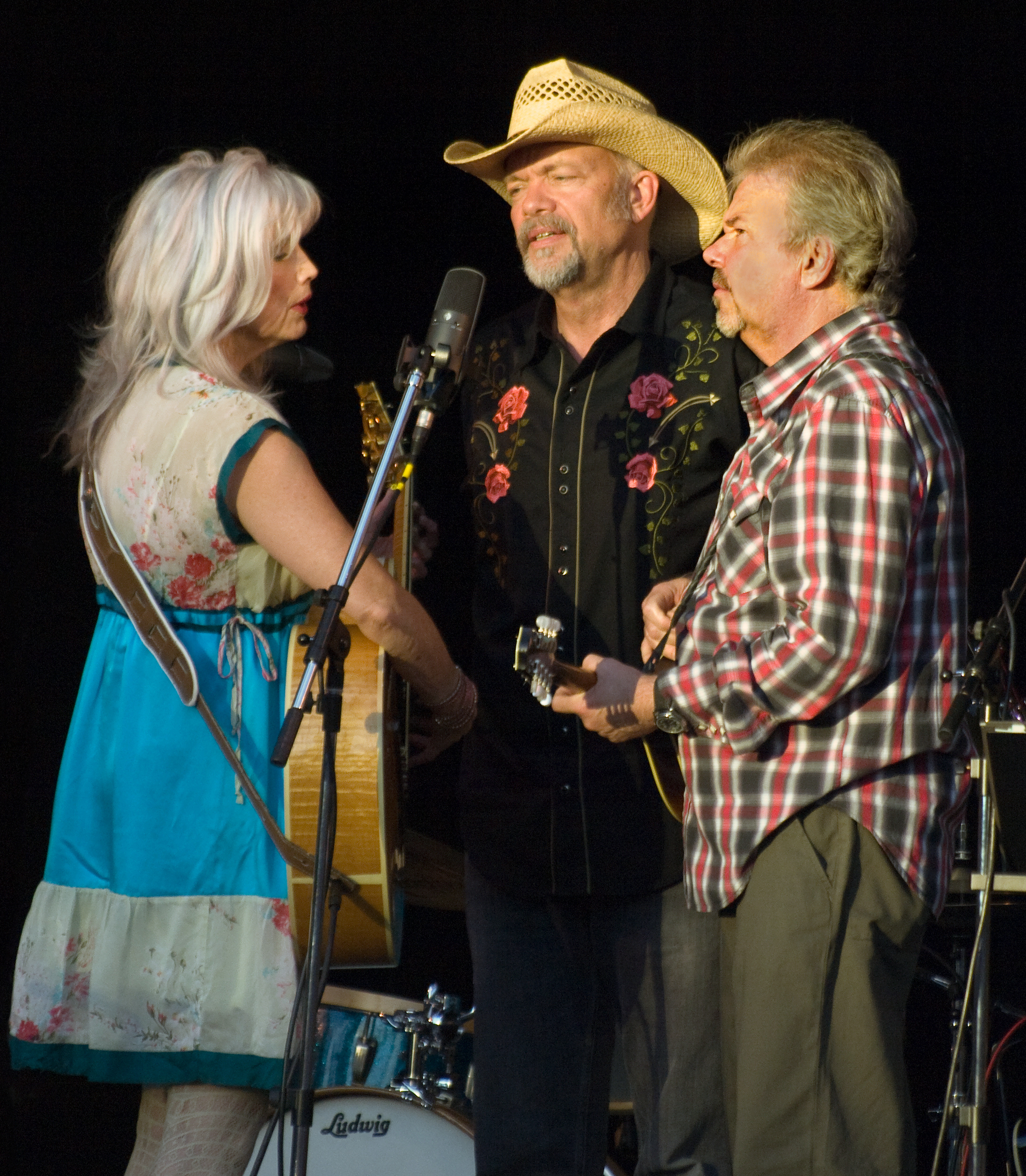
With Emmylou Harris and Phil Madeira, 2008

=== Early years ===
Simpkins was raised in Christiansburg, Virginia, southwest of Roanoke. He learned fiddle at age six and played in a show with Flatt and Scruggs at age nine. Simpkins also learned banjo and guitar at a young age. Simpkins and his brother Ronnie played in a family group, and eventually joined the bluegrass band Upland Express, releasing an album on Leather Records in 1979. Other members included his brother Ronnie (bass), Ken Farmer (guitar), Barry Collins (banjo), and Tonya Gibson (mandolin).

=== McPeak Brothers ===
When he graduated from high school, Simpkins joined the McPeak Brothers as a full-time member, and continued with them into the early 1980s. Members were Simpkins (mandolin, fiddle), Mike McPeak (guitar), Dewey McPeak (banjo), Jim Buchanan (fiddle), Phil Gazell (harmonica), Jerry Douglas (resonator guitar), and Larry McPeak (bass).

=== Virginia Squires ===
In 1981, Simpkins joined the band Heights of Grass, which evolved into the Virginia Squires. Members included Rickie Simpkins (fiddle, mandolin), his brother Ronnie Simpkins (bass), Sammy Shelor (guitar, banjo), and Mark Newton (guitar). 1984, they were voted Bluegrass Band of the Year by the Country Music Association of Virginia. They broke up in 1989, but in 2016 and 2017 got together for reunion shows.

=== Tony Rice Unit ===
Simpkins joined the Tony Rice Unit in 1983, who combined traditional bluegrass and jazz. Besides Rice and Simpkins, other members included Jimmy Gaudreau (mandolin), Wyatt Rice (guitar), and Ronnie Simpkins (bass). Simpkins also played in Tony's brother Wyatt Rice's band. Simpkins joined David Parmley, Scott Vestal and Continental Divide to record the album Feel Good Day.

=== Lonesome River Band ===
In 2000, Simpkins joined the Lonesome River Band and in 2001, joined gospel group the Isaacs, splitting his time between the two ensembles. In 2002, Simpkins toured with the Gaithers and in 2007, Simpkins also began touring with Emmylou Harris and her Red Dirt Boys.

=== The Seldom Scene ===
Simpkins joined the Seldom Scene in January 2016 when Ben Eldridge retired from the band. Other members of the band include Lou Reid (mandolin, guitar), Dudley Connell (guitar), Ronnie Simpkins (bass), and Fred Travers (resonator guitar). Simpkins left the Seldom Scene in 2017, and was replaced by Ron Stewart.

=== Solo recordings ===
Simpkins released his solo album Dancing on the Fingerboard in 1997 on the Pinecastle Records label. He played fiddle and mandolin, and sang lead vocals, and wrote several of the songs. Dancing on the Fingerboard was nominated for the International Bluegrass Music Association (IBMA) Instrumental Recording of the Year award.

Simpkins released his Don't Fret It album in 2002 on Doobie Shea. Guests included Wyatt Rice, Dan Tyminski, Ronnie Bowman, Tony Rice, Randy Kohrs, Ronnie Simpkins, Wendy Newcomer, and Ernie Thacker.

=== Awards ===
In 2008, Simpkins (along with his brother Ronnie) was inducted into the Virginia Folk Music Hall of Fame.

== Discography ==
=== Solo recordings ===
- 1981 Galax 46th Annual Old Fiddlers Convention "Jerusalem Ridge" 5th place Bluegrass Fiddle (Heritage Records)
- 1997: Dancing on the Fingerboard (Pinecastle)
- 2002: Don't Fret It (Doobie Shea)

=== With the McPeak Brothers ===
- 1978: Bend in the River (County)

=== With Upland Express ===
- 1979: Upland Express (Leather LBG 7709)

=== With Heights of Grass ===
- 1982: Live at the Flatrock! (self-released)

=== With the Virginia Squires ===
- 1984: Bluegrass With a Touch of Class (self-released)
- 1985: I'm Working My Way (Rebel)
- 1985: Mountains And Memories (Rebel)
- 1986: Hard Times & Heartaches (Rebel)
- 1988: Variations (Rebel)
- 1998: Best of Virginia Squires (Rebel)

=== With The Lonesome River Band ===
- 1994: Old Country Town (Sugar Hill)
- 2000: Talkin' to Myself (Sugar Hill)

=== With David Parmley and Continental Divide ===
- 1998: Feel Good Day (Pinecastle)

=== With Tony Rice ===
- 1996: Tony Rice Sings Gordon Lightfoot (Rounder)
- 2000: Unit of Measure (Rounder)
- 2003: 58957:The Bluegrass Guitar Collection (Rounder)

=== With The Isaacs ===
- 2002: Eye of the Storm (Horizon)

=== With the Seldom Scene ===
- 2014: Long Time... Seldom Scene (Smithsonian Folkways Recordings)

=== Also appears on ===
- 1981 Galax 46th Annual Old Fiddlers Convention "Jerusalem Ridge" 5th place Bluegrass Fiddle (Heritage Records)
- 1984: Virginia Rail - No Train Song (MRC)
- 1987: Larry Rice - Time Machine (Rebel)
- 1988: Larry Stephenson - Everytime I Sing a Love Song (Webco)
- 1989: Mary Chapin Carpenter - State of the Heart (Columbia)
- 1989: Mike Auldridge - Treasures Untold (Sugar Hill)
- 1989: Wyatt Rice - New Market Gap (Rounder)
- 1989: The Rice Brothers: The Rice Brothers (Rounder)
- 1989: Bill Emerson and Pete Goble - Dixie in My Eye (Webco)
- 1989: Chris Warner - Chris Warner and Friends (Webco)
- 1990: The Bluegrass Band - Second Cut (Hip Hop Helps)
- 1990: Bill Emerson - Gold Plated Banjo (Rebel)
- 1990: Larry Rice - Artesia (Rebel)
- 1990: The Spencers - It'll Be Worth It After All (Skylite)
- 1991: Bill Emerson - Reunion (Pinecastle / Webco)
- 1991: Lou Reid - When It Rains (Sugar Hill)
- 1991: Larry Stephenson - Can't Stop Myself (Pinecastle / Webco)
- 1992: Jim Eanes - Classic Bluegrass (Rebel)
- 1993: Beaver Creek - Having a Wonderful Time (Pinecastle)
- 1994: Ronnie Bowman - Cold Virginia Night (Rebel)
- 1994: Emerson and Taylor - Appaloosa (Webco)
- 1995: Ralph Stanley and Joe Isaacs - Gospel Gathering (Freeland)
- 1996: Bill Emerson - Banjo Man (Pinecastle / Webco)
- 1996: Exit Thirteen - Wind on My Back (Freeland)
- 1996: Larry Rice - Notions and Novelties (Rebel)
- 1996: Wyatt Rice - Picture in a Tear (Rounder)
- 1996: Charlie Sizemore - In My View (Rebel)
- 1996: Larry Stephenson - I See God (Pinecastle / Webco)
- 1997: Eddie from Ohio - Big Noise (Virginia Soul)
- 1997: Kazuaki Miyazaki - Man-O-Mandolin (Red Clay)
- 1997: Rice, Rice, Hillman, and Pedersen - Out of the Woodwork (Rounder)
- 1997: various artists - Bluegrass '97 (Pinecastle)
- 1998: Emerson and Newton - A Foot in the Past, A Foot in the Future (Pinecastle)
- 1998: Don Rigsby - Vision (Sugar Hill)
- 1998: Mark Newton - Living a Dream (Rebel)
- 1999: Phil Leadbetter - Philibuster (Rounder)
- 1999: Rice, Rice, Hillman, and Pedersen - Rice, Rice, Hillman & Pedersen (Rounder)
- 1999: various artists - Bluegrass '99 (Pinecastle)
- 2000: East Virginia - Back Home in East Virginia (Copper Creek)
- 2000: Kim Person and Lana Puckett - Windows of Life (Cimarron)
- 2000: Scott Vestal - Millennia (Pinecastle)
- 2000: Zoe Speaks - Pearl (Redbird)
- 2001: Randy Kohrs - A Crack in My Armour (Junction)
- 2001: Wendy Lewis - Mountain Memories 2000 (Orchard)
- 2001: Wendy Lewis - Christmas Favorites (RimRidge)
- 2001: Rice, Rice, Hillman, and Pedersen - Running Wild (Rounder)
- 2001: Charlie Waller and The Country Gentlemen - Crying in the Chapel (Freeland)
- 2001: Candlewyck - Firemen (Votive)
- 2002: Nils Lofgren - Breakaway Angel (Vision / Wienerworld)
- 2002: Ronnie Reno - Portfolio (Shell Point)
- 2003: Cathy Fink & Marcy Marxer - Postcards (Community)
- 2003: Springfield Exit - Americana (Cracker Barrel)
- 2004: Randy Thompson - That's Not Me (Leap)
- 2005: Larry Rice - Clouds Over Carolina (Rebel)
- 2005: NewFound Road - NewFound Road (Mountain Home)
- 2006: Jimmy Gaudreau - In Good Company (CMH)
- 2006: Nils Lofgren - Sacred Weapon (Vision)
- 2007: Donna Hughes - Gaining Wisdom (Rounder)
- 2007: John Starling and Carolina Star - Slidin' Home (Rebel)
- 2007: Tony Trischka - Double Banjo Bluegrass Spectacular (Rounder)
- 2009: Dan Menzone - Frostbite (self-released)
- 2009: Porchlight Trio - Bluegrass Gospel Favorites: Songs of Bill & Gloria Gaither (Spring Hill)
- 2010: Bill Emerson - Southern (Rural Rhythm)
- 2010: Jimmy Gaudreau - Pieces and Bits (Goose Creek)
- 2010: Grace Griffith - Sailing (Blix Street)
- 2011: Dave Sharp - Rural Roots (CD Baby)
- 2011: Dave Giegerich - It's About Time (self-released)
- 2012: Millpond Moon - Broke in Brooklyn (Tikopia)
- 2012: Richard Bennett - Last Train from Poor Valley (Lonesome Day)
- 2014: Bill Emerson and the Sweet Dixie Band - Dancin' Annie (Rural Rhythm)
- 2015: Bill Emerson and the Sweet Dixie Band - The Gospel Side of Bill Emerson and Sweet Dixie (Rural Rhythm)
- 2015: John McCutcheon - Joe Hill's Last Will (Appalsongs)
- 2015: Millpond Moon - Time to Turn the Tide (Tikopia)
- 2017: Randy Thompson - War Peace Love Fear (self-released)
