= Kenny Smith (bluegrass) =

American guitarist and vocalist (born 1967)

- Born: September 19, 1967 (age 59); Nine Mile, Indiana
- Genre: Bluegrass music
- Occupation: Musician
- Instruments: Guitar, vocals
- Years active: 1993–present
- Labels: Sugar Hill, Rebel, Gat3, Farm Boy
- Website: kennysmithguitar.com
- 1948 Regal Milord

Kenny Smith is an American guitarist and vocalist in the bluegrass tradition.

== Biography ==
=== Early years ===
Smith is originally from Nine Mile, Indiana. His father and grandfather played fiddle, and Smith started playing guitar at age 4. He learned to play fiddle tunes on the guitar by listening to Norman Blake's albums.

=== Lonesome River Band ===
Smith began playing professionally with Claire Lynch and the Front Porch Stringband in 1993. In 1996, Smith joined Sammy Shelor, Don Rigsby, and Ronnie Bowman as a member of The Lonesome River Band, replacing Tim Austin. While a part of this group, Smith won the International Bluegrass Music Association's (IBMA) Guitarist of the Year award in 1999 and 2000. He left the band in 2001.

=== Kenny and Amanda Smith ===
Kenny and Amanda Smith met at a Lonesome River Band concert, where Amanda gave Kenny a tape of her music. They decided to collaborate, and then decided to marry.

Their first album Slowly But Surely in 2001 was recorded when Kenny was still with the Lonesome River Band and Amanda was working a day job. The album was popular enough to be listed on the bluegrass charts, and the Smiths decided to form the Kenny and Amanda Smith Band. They won the IBMA's Emerging Artist of the Year award in 2003.

In 2004, they released the album House Down the Block. Ronald Inscore played mandolin, Steve Hubers played banjo, and Greg Martin played bass.

The Kenny and Amanda Smith Band released Live and Learn in 2008, along with Zachary McLamb (bass), Aaron Williams (mandolin), and Ron Stewart (fiddle, banjo).

On their album Unbound they were assisted by Wayne Winkle (vocals), Kyle Perkins (bass), Jacob Burleson (mandolin), and Justin Jenkins (banjo). The lead single "You Know That I Would" stayed at the No. 1 spot for consecutive weeks on the Bluegrass Today Weekly Airplay charts.

=== Solo recordings ===
Smith's debut solo album Studebaker was released in 1997, featuring Amanda Smith (vocals), Barry Bales (bass), Adam Steffey (mandolin), Sammy Shelor (banjo), Don Rigsby. Daniel Carwile (fiddle), and Ronnie Bowman.

On his 2011 album Return, Smith employed a variety of vintage guitars: his 1935 Martin D-18, Norman Blake's sunburst 1933 D-28, and a Gibson 1935 jumbo prototype. Musicians on the album included Bales, Steffey, Aubrey Haynie (fiddle), Jim Denman (banjo), and Adam Hurt (clawhammer banjo). Glenn Tabor co-produced the album with Smith.

=== Band of Ruhks ===
Smith is a founding member of Band Of Ruhks, along with Don Rigsby and Ronnie Bowman. During a Lonesome River Band reunion performance, all three discovered a mutual longing to once again perform together. Band of Ruhks released a self-titled album in 2015. Brian Fesler plays banjo in the band.

=== Music instruction ===
Smith has taught at guitar workshops and master classes. In 2004, AcuTab Publications released Smith's Tunes and Techniques, a two-DVD instruction set. In 2017, Smith launched KennySmithGuitar.com, with instructional videos, product reviews, interviews with other musicians, and information about classic vintage guitars. Guitar lessons are priced based on length, but all other content is free to view.

=== Guitars ===
Luthier Randy Lucas designed the Kenny Smith model guitar using Smith's 1935 Martin D-18 as a conceptual starting point. Only twenty one were built.

=== Personal life ===
Smith lives in Lebanon, Tennessee with his wife Amanda and their daughter Annabelle.

== Discography ==
=== Solo records ===
- 1997: Studebaker (Sugar Hill)
- 2011: Return (Gat3)

=== With Amanda Smith ===
- 2001: Slowly but Surely (Farm Boy)
- 2004: House Down the Block (Rebel)
- 2005: Always Never Enough (Rebel)
- 2007: Tell Someone (Rebel)
- 2008: Live and Learn (Rebel)
- 2012: Catch Me If I Try (Farm Boy)
- 2016: Unbound (Farm Boy)

=== With the Lonesome River Band ===
- 1996: One Step Forward (Sugar Hill)
- 1998: Finding the Way (Sugar Hill)
- 2000: Talkin' to Myself (Sugar Hill)

=== Also appears on ===
- 1995: Claire Lynch - Moonlighter (Rounder)
- 1997: Sammy Shelor: Leading Roll (Sugar Hill)
- 1998: Butch Baldassari - New Classics for Bluegrass Mandolin (Sound Art)
- 1998: Ronnie Bowman - The Man I'm Tryin' to Be (Sugar Hill)
- 1998: Don Rigsby - A Vision (Sugar Hill)
- 1999: Ari Vaughan - I Just Want to Thank You Lord (Freeland)
- 2000: Alan Bibey - In The Blue Room (Sugar Hill)
- 2001: The Country Gentlemen - Crying in the Chapel (Freeland)
- 2001: Candlewyck - Crooked Creek Road (Votive)
- 2004: John Lawless - Five & Dime (Copper Creek)
- 2004: Ralph Stanley II - Carrying On (Rebel)
- 2005: Larry Sparks - 40 (Rebel)
- 2012: Marty Raybon - Southern Roots & Branches (Yesterday & Today) (Rural Rhythm)
- 2014: Steve Gulley - Family, Friends & Fellowship (Rural Rhythm)
- 2014: Phil Leadbetter - The Next Move (Pinecastle)
- 2016: Stuart Wyrick - East Tennessee Sunrise (Rural Rhythm)

=== Music instruction ===
- 2004: Tunes and Techniques DVD (Accutab)
