= Randy Howard (fiddler) =

American fiddler (1960–1999)

Randy Howard (1960–1999) was an American bluegrass, country and old time fiddler.

== Early life ==
Howard was born in Georgia and grew up in Milledgeville. As a child, he learned to play several instruments, including fiddle, and won his first fiddle contest at the age of 18 in Union Grove, North Carolina.

== Career ==
Howard was the first prize fiddler at the inaugural Tri-State Bluegrass Association fiddle contest in 1982. He worked as a session musician in Nashville beginning in 1990. He played with many well-known musicians and bands, including George Jones and Ricky Skaggs. He continued to win many fiddle contests.

Howard performed on two albums with the Lonesome River Band. He was a guest artist on an album by Allen Shadd. He was named fiddle player of the year at the International Bluegrass Music Awards in 1996.

Howard died of cancer in 1999. That year, he was once more named fiddle player of the year at the International Bluegrass Music Awards. An album of his recordings, I Rest My Case, was released posthumously by Sugar Hill Records in 2001.

== Discography ==
Raw Guitar, Robin Kessinger

- Randy Howard, Atlantic, 1988
- One Step Forward, Lonesome River Band, Sugar Hill Records, 1996
- Finding the Way, Lonesome River Band Sugar Hill Records, 1998
- Shore to Shore, Mae McKenna, 1999
- I Rest My Case, 2001
