= Jackson Hollow (band) =

Canadian country and bluegrass band

Jackson Hollow is a Canadian country and bluegrass band from British Columbia. They are most noted for their album Roses, which was a Juno Award nominee for Traditional Roots Album of the Year at the Juno Awards of 2024.

The band consists of vocalist Tianna Lefebvre, fiddler and mandolinist Mike Sanyshyn, bassist Charlie Frie and guitarist and mandolinist Eric Reed. They are based in Surrey.

Roses, their debut album, was released in 2023 on Mountain Fever Records.
