= Crying in the Chapel (disambiguation) =

"Crying in the Chapel" is a 1953 song by Artie Glenn.

Crying in the Chapel may also refer to:

- Crying in the Chapel (album), 2001 album by Country Gentlemen
- "Crying in the Chapel" (Peter Blakeley song), 1990 song by Peter Blakeley
