= Alan Bibey =

American singer (born 1964)

- Born: Alan Daniel Bibey; August 24, 1964 (age 62); Walnut Cove, North Carolina, U.S.
- Genre: Bluegrass music
- Occupation: Musician
- Instruments: 1923 Lloyd Loar Gibson F-5 mandolin (signed by Loar on the same date as Bill Monroe's)
- Years active: 1982–present
- Label: Sugar Hill Records
- Website: alanbibey.com

Alan Daniel Bibey (born August 24, 1964) is a mandolinist, singer, songwriter, and band leader in the bluegrass tradition.

== Biography ==
=== Early years ===
Bibey was raised in Walnut Cove, North Carolina. His dad and his mother's brothers were bluegrass musicians, and Bibey's love of bluegrass music was sparked when at age five his dad took him to see Bill Monroe in Walkertown. Bibey immediately took up the mandolin.

Bibey played at fiddler’s conventions and contests and in two bluegrass bands with his dad. When Bibey was age 12, he and his dad recorded the album Southern Tradition. He then joined the band Interstate Exchange at age 14, which consisted of Barry Berrier (guitar), Mitch Freeman (bass), and Sammy Shelor (banjo). Bibey won the mandolin championship in 1982 at the World’s Fair in Knoxville at the age of 17. In 1983, Bibey played with Wes Golding & Sure-Fire.

=== The New Quicksilver ===
Bibey started playing music full-time in 1985 in The New Quicksilver with Terry Baucom, Randy Graham, and Jimmy Haley.

=== IIIrd Tyme Out ===
1990, Bibey was a founding member of IIIrd Tyme Out, along with Russell Moore (guitar), Mike Hartgrove (fiddle), Ray Deaton (bass), and Terry Baucom (banjo). Bibey left three years and three albums later, and was replaced by Lou Reid and then Wayne Benson.

=== Lou Reid and Carolina ===
Bibey played for a time with Lou Reid and Carolina, and participated in the recording of their self-titled album in 1996.

=== BlueRidge ===
In 1997 New Quicksilver reformed as Baucom, Bibey, and BlueRidge. They recorded the album Come Along With Me with Ed Biggerstaff (bass), Dewey Brown (fiddle), and Junior Sisk (vocals, guitar).

=== Grasstowne ===
In 2006, Bibey left BlueRidge to form Grasstowne with Steve Gulley and Phil Leadbetter. The current lineup includes Bibey, Gena Britt (banjo), Tony Watt (guitar), Zak McLamb (bass), and Laura Orshaw (fiddle).

=== Recording projects ===
2002, released the solo album In the Blue Room featuring Terry Baucom, Jerry Douglas, Tony Rice, Kenny Smith, Sammy Shelor, and Del McCoury.

In 2013, Bibey and Wayne Benson released Mandolin Chronicles, an album of mandolin duets. Guests included Wyatt Rice, Barry Bales, Ron Stewart, Russell Moore, and Ronnie Bowman.

=== Other projects ===
In the early 1990s, Bibey was based out of Myrtle Beach, SC and was a part of the original cast of the country music variety show "Southern Country Nights."

In 1996, Bibey participated in the Young Mando Monsters project with Ronnie McCoury, Adam Steffey, Radim Zenkl, Emory Lester, Wayne Benson, Dan Tyminski, and Ray Legere.

Gibson produced an Alan Bibey signature mandolin in 2004.

=== Awards ===
In 2001, Bibey won the International Bluegrass Music Association (IBMA) Instrumental Recording of the Year and the Recorded Event of the Year awards.

Bibey was nominated in 2003 for a bluegrass album Grammy for the album Side By Side by his band BlueRidge.

In 2007, 2009, 2010 & 2018 Alan was voted Mandolin Player Of The Year by the Society for the Preservation of Bluegrass Music in America organization in Nashville, TN.

== Discography ==
=== Solo albums ===
- 2000: In the Blue Room (Sugar Hill)

=== Alan Bibey and Wayne Benson ===
- 2013: The Mandolin Chronicles (Pinecastle)

=== With The New Quicksilver ===
- 1986: Ready For The Times (Cross Current) reissued as Baucom, Bibey, Graham, and Haley

=== With IIIrd Tyme Out ===
- 1991: IIIrd Tyme Out (Rebel)
- 1992: Puttin' New Roots Down (Rebel)

=== With Lou Reid and Carolina ===
- 1996: Lou Reid & Carolina (Rebel)

=== With Baucom, Bibey, Graham and Haley ===
- 1998: Baucom, Bibey, Graham & Haley (Rebel)

=== With BlueRidge ===
- 1999: Common Ground (Sugar Hill)
- 2002: Come Along with Me (Sugar Hill) as Baucom, Bibey & BlueRidge
- 2004: Side by Side (Sugar Hill)
- 2006: Gettin' Ready (Pinecastle)

=== With Grasstowne ===
- 2007: The Road Headin' Home (Thirty Tigers)
- 2009: The Other Side of Towne (Pinecastle)
- 2011: Kickin' Up Dust (Rural Rhythm)
- 2015: Alan Bibey & Grasstowne 4 (Mountain Fever)
- 2019: Gonna Rise & Shine (Morning Glory)
- 2021: Hitchhiking to California (Billy Blue)

=== Also appears on ===
- 1983: Larry Richardson - Ship Of Zion (LifeLine)
- 1998: Ronnie Bowman - The Man I'm Tryin to Be (Sugar Hill)
- 2000: Mark Newton - Follow Me Back to the Fold (Rebel)
- 2000: Herschel Sizemore - My Style (Hay Holler)
- 2000: various artists - Knee Deep in Bluegrass: The AcuTab Sessions (Rebel)
- 2004: John Lawless - Five & Dime (Copper Creek)
- 2007: Dwight Mccall - Never Say Never Again (Rural Rhythm)
- 2008: various artists - Hornography (Left of Center)
- 2012: Carrie Hassler - Distance (Rural Rhythm)
- 2014: Steve Gulley - Family, Friends & Fellowship (Rural Rhythm)
- 2014: Phil Leadbetter - The Next Move (Pinecastle)
- 2016: Stuart Wyrick - East Tennessee Sunrise (Rural Rhythm)
- 2017: Wilson Banjo Co. - Spirits in the Hills (Bonfire)
- 2018: Mike Bentley - "All I've Got" (Union House Records)

=== Music Instruction ===
- 1998: AcuTab Transcriptions, Vol. 1 (Acutab) ISBN 978-0786636020
- 2000: Mel Bay Presents 2000 Mandolin: Featuring Solos by the World's Finest Mandolinists book (Mel Bay) ISBN 978-0786652921 contributor
- 2004: Alan Bibey - Master Mandolinist DVD (Acutab)
- 2016: Master Anthology of Mandolin Solos, Volume 1 book, online video (Mel Bay) ISBN 978-0786693733 contributor
