= Aubrey Haynie =

American bluegrass musician (born 1974)

- Born: March 27, 1974 (age 52)
- Origin: Tampa, Florida, United States
- Genres: Bluegrass, Country
- Occupations: Musician, songwriter
- Instruments: Fiddle; Mandolin
- Years active: 1995–present
- Label: Sugar Hill

Aubrey E. Haynie (born March 27, 1974) is an American bluegrass musician who plays the fiddle and mandolin. In his career, he has recorded three studio albums for the Sugar Hill Records label, all three of which contained mostly songs that he wrote himself. He also holds several credits as a session fiddler and mandolinist.

== Biography ==
=== Early influences ===
When Haynie was nine, he began taking fiddle lessons from his grandmother's cousin, a man named Ted Locke. He studied the fiddle, for two years, after which he took up the mandolin. He became exceedingly good at both, and within two years he joined a bluegrass band named the Bluegrass Parlor Band. While he was traveling, he got a chance to meet Chubby Wise, a self-styled "original" bluegrass fiddler, on many occasions. These opportunities enriched his sense of music, and were a great inspiration to him in his younger years. Another major influence on Haynie's music was that of Kenny Baker, whose fiddle albums were some of his favorites. Those familiar with Baker's fiddle style might recognize similarities in Haynie's sound.

In 1990, at age 16, attending the Florida fiddling championships, and competing, Haynie won first place in the contemporary division for the second time, playing Wild Fiddler's Rag and Skater's Waltz.

In August 1996 Haynie lost two violins and a bow, when a lightning-induced fire burnt Tim Austin's Doobie Shea Studios to the ground.

In 2004 Haynie won the fiddle category at the 39th Annual Academy of Country Music Awards.

Haynie has been seen appearing in informal music performances under other musicians' headlines, and earned a living as a session musician.

== Discography ==
- Doin' My Time (Sugar Hill, 1997)
- A Man Must Carry On (Sugar Hill, 2000)
- The Bluegrass Fiddle Album (Sugar Hill, 2003)

== Awards ==
- International Bluegrass Music Association Instrumental Album of the Year - 2003 for The Bluegrass Fiddle Album IBMA Awards - Past Recipients
- Academy of Country Music Award for fiddle - 2004
- International Bluegrass Music Association Recorded Event of the Year - 1996 for Bluegrass '95 (Scott Vestal, Aubrey Haynie, Adam Steffey, Wayne Benson, Barry Bales & Clay Jones)
- International Bluegrass Music Association Gospel Recorded Performance of the Year - 1998 - for Stanley Gospel Tradition: Songs About Our Savior (Tim Austin, Barry Bales, Ronnie Bowman, Aubrey Haynie, James King, Dwight McCall, Dale Perry, Don Rigsby, James Alan Shelton, Junior Sisk, Charlie Sizemore, Craig Smith, Scottie Sparks, Adam Steffey, Ernie Thacker, Dan Tyminski)
