= Don Rigsby =

American singer-songwriter (born 1968)

- Born: Donald Glen Rigsby; February 18, 1968 (age 57); Isonville, Kentucky
- Genres: Bluegrass music
- Occupation: Musician
- Instruments: Mandolin, fiddle, guitar, vocals
- Years active: 1998–present

Donald Glen Rigsby is an American mandolinist, fiddler, guitarist, vocalist, and producer in the bluegrass tradition. He is known for his solo career, and for his work with the Lonesome River Band and Longview.

== Biography ==
=== Early years ===
Growing up in Eastern Kentucky, Rigsby discovered bluegrass music early on. At age 5, Rigsby learned to sing from a 1959 tape of Ralph Stanley singing "Hills of Home" and "Little Maggie."

Rigsby befriended two of Ralph Stanley's Clinch Mountain Boys: Ricky Skaggs (Rigsby's cousin) and Keith Whitley. Rigsby learned guitar at age 12, then fiddle, dulcimer, and mandolin.

While attending Morehead State University, Rigsby was a member of TruGrass, which included Johnie Lewis (banjo) and Tim Gilliam (guitar), with Rigsby on mandolin.

In 1987, Rigsby joined Charlie Sizemore's bluegrass band and stayed for two years. When he graduated in 1990, Rigsby moved to Nashville and joined Vern Gosdin's road band.

Rigsby's first national exposure was with Bluegrass Cardinals from 1991 until 1993, then he joined J. D. Crowe and the New South from 1993 until 1995.

=== Lonesome River Band ===
Rigsby joined the Lonesome River Band when Dan Tyminski left the band. Rigsby stayed for six years and appeared on three of their albums: One Step Forward (1996), Finding The Way (1998), and Talkin' To Myself (2000). The band included Rigsby, Ronnie Bowman, Sammy Shelor, and Kenny Smith. When John Duffey suddenly died, Rigsby filled in with the Seldom Scene.

=== Longview ===
Along with Dudley Connell and James King, Rigsby was a member of Longview. The band released three albums: Longview (1997), High Lonesome (1999), and Lessons In Stone (2002). Other members included Joe Mullins (banjo), Glen Duncan (fiddle), and Marshall Wilborn (bass). Rigsby and Connell sing Stanley Brothers-style high-baritone harmonies behind King.

=== Solo career ===
Rigsby's first solo album A Vision, released in 1999, was a collection of bluegrass gospel music. J. D. Crowe, Ralph Stanley, Sammy Shelor, Roy Huskey Jr., and Ricky Skaggs provide support. The album won the Association of Independent Music's Gospel Album of the Year award. He also received the 1999 Bluegrass Now Magazine Fans' Choice Award for Vocal Tenor of the Year, and the 2001 Governor's Kentucky Star Award.

In 2000, the title track from the album Empty Old Mailbox won the 2001 SPBGMA Song of the Year award. Guest artists on the album included Jerry Douglas, Tim Stafford, Stuart Duncan, J. D. Crowe, and Larry Sparks.

2003's The Midnight Call featured Jim Hurst (guitar), Stuart Duncan (fiddle], Carl Jackson, Rob McCoury (mandolin), Kenny Malone (percussion), and Vassar Clements.

Rigsby recorded two albums with Dudley Connell (The Seldom Scene) in the Appalachian brother duet style: Meet Me By The Moonlight (1999) and Another Saturday Night (2001).

In 2010, Rigsby released Doctor’s Orders: A Tribute to Ralph Stanley. Stanley appears on the album, as do former Clinch Mountain Boys Larry Sparks, Ricky Skaggs, Charlie Sizemore, Steve Sparkman and Stanley's lead guitarist, James Alan Shelton.

In 2016, Rigsby and David Thom collaborated on the album New Territory which also featured Peter Rowan, Randy Kohrs, and Tim Crouch.

=== Rock County ===
Rock County was formed by Rigsby in 2001. Other members included Glen Duncan (fiddle), Dale Vanderpool (banjo) Ray Craft (guitar), and Robin Smith (bass). They released two albums: Rock County (2002) and Rock Solid (2003). In 2003, Vanderpool was replaced by Scott Vestal, and Ray Craft was replaced by Keith Tew. The band broke up in 2004.

=== Midnight Call ===
In 2006, Rigsby released Hillbilly Heartache, his first album as the leader of his new band Midnight Call. The band includes Shayne Bartley (guitar), Jesse Wells (fiddle), Robert Maynard (bass), and Dale Vanderpool (banjo).

=== Flashback ===
In 2016, Rigsby formed Flashback, a band consisting of former members of The New South. The band consists of Rigsby, Richard Bennett (guitar, lead vocals), Phil Leadbetter (resonator guitar), and Curt Chapman (bass). The band name was inspired by the title of the album J. D. Crowe released in 1995.

=== Music education ===
In 2001 Rigsby accepted a director position at the Kentucky Center for Traditional Music at Morehead State University. He remastered a series of local radio shows hosted more than three decades ago by Ricky Skaggs and Keith Whitley to be released on Sugar Hill. He also taught vocal harmony and folk/country music listening. In 2010, Rigsby left the program to pursue music full time.

=== Production and session work ===
Rigsby produced the album 40 by Larry Sparks, which in 2005 was awarded Recorded Event of the Year and Album of the Year by the IBMA.

Rigsby sang on Alan Jackson's The Bluegrass Album in 2013, and a tour with Jackson included an appearance on Late Night with David Letterman on CBS.

=== Personal life ===
Rigsby still lives in Isonville with his daughter and son.

== Discography ==
=== Solo albums ===
- 1998: A Vision (Sugar Hill)
- 2000: Empty Old Mailbox (Sugar Hill)
- 2003: The Midnight Call (Sugar Hill)
- 2006: Hillbilly Heartache (Rebel) with Midnight Call
- 2010: The Voice of God (Rebel) with Midnight Call
- 2013: Doctor's Orders: A Tribute to Ralph Stanley (Rebel)
- 2016: New Territory (9 Lives) with David Thom

=== With J. D. Crowe and the New South ===
- 1994: Flashback (Rounder)

=== With the Lonesome River Band ===
- 1996: One Step Forward (Sugar Hill)
- 1998: Finding the Way (Sugar Hill)
- 2000: Talkin' To Myself (Sugar Hill)

=== With Longview ===
- 1997: Longview (Rounder)
- 1999: High Lonesome (Rounder)
- 2002: Lessons in Stone (Rebel)
- 2008: Deep in the Mountains (Rounder)

=== Dudley Connell and Don Rigsby ===
- 1999: Meet Me By the Moonlight (Sugar Hill)
- 2001: Another Saturday Night (Sugar Hill)

=== With Rock County ===
- 2002: Rock County (Rebel)
- 2003: Rock Solid (Rebel)

=== As primary artist/song contributor ===
- 2002: various artists - Mother Queen of My Heart: A Collection of Songs Inspired by Mom (Sugar Hill) - track 11, "If I'd Had a Mother Like You"
- 2005: various artists - Bluegrass Gospel Reunion (CMH) - track 2, "Gone Home"
- 2011: various artists - With Body and Soul: A Bluegrass Tribute to Bill Monroe (Rebel) - track 7, "Kentucky Waltz"
- 2011: various artists - Appalachian Gospel Revival (Rural Rhythm) - track 1, "Get In Line Brother" with Rickey Wasson

=== As producer ===
- 2000: Dave Evans - Bad Moon Shining (Rebel)
- 2001: Dave Evans - Hang Out a Light For Me (Rebel)
- 2001: Josh Williams - Now That You're Gone (Pinecastle)
- 2004: Josh Williams - Lonesome Highway (Pinecastle)
- 2005: Larry Sparks - 40 (Rebel)
- 2007: Larry Sparks - Last Suit You Wear (McCoury Music)

=== Also appears on ===
- 1994: Ronnie Bowman - Cold Virginia Night (Rebel)
- 1994: David Parmley - Southern Heritage (Rebel)
- 1994: Charlie Sizemore - Back Home's (Rebel)
- 1997: Aubrey Haynie - Doin My Time (Sugar Hill)
- 1997: Jason Carter - On The Move (Rounder)
- 1997: Rickie Simpkins - Dancing on the Fingerboard (Pinecastle)
- 1997: Kenny Smith - Studebaker (Sugar Hill)
- 1998: Ronnie Bowman - The Man I'm Tryin' to Be (Sugar Hill)
- 1998: Jim Mills - Bound to Ride (Sugar Hill)
- 1998: Mark Newton - Living a Dream (Rebel)
- 1999: Tara Nevins - Mule to Ride (Sugar Hill)
- 2001: Candlewyck – Firemen (Votive Records)
- 2003: Burrito Deluxe - Georgia Peach (Lamon)
- 2003: Randy Howard - I Rest My Case (Sugar Hill)
- 2004: Randy Kohrs - I'm Torn (Lonesome Day)
- 2005: Pete Goble - When I’m Knee Deep in Bluegrass (FireHeart)
- 2005: Jim Mills - Hide Head Blues (Sugar Hill)
- 2007: Tom T Hall - Sings Dixie & Tom T. (Blue Circle)
- 2007: Randy Kohrs - Old Photograph (Rural Rhythm)
- 2008: Rickey Wasson - From the Heart and Soul (Rural Rhythm)
- 2013: Alan Jackson - The Bluegrass Album (EMI Nashville)
- 2013: James King - Three Chords and the Truth (Rounder)
- 2013: Peter Rowan - The Old School (Compass)
