= Ronnie Bowman =

American singer and composer (1961–2026)

Background information
- Born: William Franklin Bowman; July 9, 1961; Mount Airy, North Carolina, U.S.
- Died: March 22, 2026 (aged 64) Nashville, Tennessee, U.S.
- Genres: Bluegrass music
- Occupation: Musician
- Instruments: Guitar, bass, vocals
- Years active: 1987–2026
- Labels: Rebel, Sugar Hill, Entertainment One Music
- Formerly of: Lonesome River Band
- Website: ronniebowman.com

William Franklin "Ronnie" Bowman (July 9, 1961 – March 22, 2026) was an American singer and composer of bluegrass music. Besides his solo albums, he was known for his work with the Lonesome River Band.

== Life and career ==
=== Early years ===
A native of Mount Airy, North Carolina, Bowman sang gospel music from age three until his late teens. He sang in his family band with his four sisters, playing at churches in North Carolina and Virginia.

Bowman joined bluegrass band The Lost and Found in 1987 and performed with them for two years.

=== Lonesome River Band ===
From 1990 until 2001, Bowman was the vocalist and bass player in the Lonesome River Band, with bandmates Sammy Shelor, Dan Tyminski, and Tim Austin. Their 1991 album Carrying the Tradition was named the IBMA 1991 Album of the Year.

=== Solo career ===
Cold Virginia Night, released in 1994, featured appearances by Alison Krauss, Del McCoury, and Tony Rice.

Bowman released Starting Over in 2003, with Don Cook producing several songs. Bowman was also assisted by Tyminski, Jerry Douglas, and Barry Bales (all from Union Station), Ron Stewart, and Steve Gulley.

Bowman 2006's It's Gettin' Better All The Time in Nashville with members of his group The Committee: Wyatt Rice (guitar), Andy Hall (resonator guitar), Jeremy Garrett (fiddle, vocals), and Garnet Imes Bowman (vocalist and Ronnie's wife). Special guests included Del McCoury, Rob McCoury, Ronnie McCoury, Dan Tyminski, and John Barlow Jarvis.

=== Songwriting ===
For Chris Stapleton's Traveller album, Bowman wrote "Nobody to Blame" with Stapleton and Barry Bales, and "Outlaw State of Mind" with Stapleton and Jerry Salley.

Lee Ann Womack included Bowman's song "The Healing Kind" (co-written with Greg Luck) on the album I Hope You Dance.

Bowman's song "It's Getting Better All the Time" (co-written with Don Cook) was recorded by Brooks & Dunn.

Bowman and Stapleton also wrote "Never Wanted Nothing More" which Kenny Chesney included on his album Just Who I Am: Poets & Pirates.

=== Band of Ruhks ===
Besides Bowman, the Band of Ruhks includes two other former Lonesome River Bandmates: Don Rigsby and Kenny Smith. Ralph Stanley provided vocals on the song "Coal Minin' Man." The band got their name from the ancient Persian word for a warrior's chariot.

Bowman frequently performed with Dan Tyminski, with whom he played in the Lonesome River Band.

=== Death ===
On March 22, 2026, Bowman died after being involved in a motorcycle collision in Nashville, Tennessee. He was 64.

=== Awards ===
Bowman was awarded the following IBMA awards:

- Male Vocalist of the Year in 1995, 1998, and 1999
- 1995 Album of the Year for Cold Virginia Night
- 1995 Song of the Year for "Cold Virginia Night"
- 1999 Song of the Year for "Three Rusty Nails"
- 1999 Gospel Performance of the Year for "Three Rusty Nails."

== Discography ==
=== Solo albums ===
- 1994: Cold Virginia Night (Rebel)
- 1998: The Man I'm Tryin' to Be (Sugar Hill)
- 2002: Starting Over (Sugar Hill)
- 2005: It's Gettin' Better All the Time (Koch Nashville)
- 2019: ‘‘Ronnie Bowman’’ (Engelhardt Music Group)

=== With the Lonesome River Band ===
- 1991: Carrying The Tradition (Rebel)
- 1994: Old Country Town (Sugar Hill)
- 1996: One Step Forward (Sugar Hill)
- 1998: Finding The Way (Sugar Hill)

=== With Band of Ruhks ===
- 2015: Band Of Ruhks (101 Ranch)
- 2019: Authentic (Rebel)

=== As composer ===
- 2000: Lee Ann Womack - I Hope You Dance (MCA Nashville) - track 1, "The Healing Kind" (co-written with Greg Luck)
- 2001: Mark Newton Band - Charlie Lawson's Still (Rebel) - track 2, "It Ain't Happened Yet" (co-written with Tim Stafford)
- 2005: Brooks & Dunn - The Greatest Hits Collection II (Arista Nashville) - track 11, "It's Getting Better All the Time" (co-written with Don Cook)
- 2007: Kenny Chesney - Just Who I Am: Poets & Pirates (Sony BMG Nashville) - track 1, "Never Wanted Nothing More" (co-written with Chris Stapleton)
- 2011: Jake Owen - Barefoot Blue Jean Night (RCA) - track 7, "The Journey of Your Life" (co-written with Troy Jones)
- 2011: Ralph Stanley - A Mother's Prayer (Rebel) - track 5, "A Mother's Prayer" (co-written with Shawn Lane)
- 2012: The Grascals - Life Finds a Way (Mountain Home) - track 1, "Life Finds A Way" (co-written with Dierks Bentley and Jamie Johnson)
- 2014: Cody Johnson - Cowboy Like Me (Cojo) - track 9, "(I Wouldn't Go There) If I Were You" (co-written with Cody Johnson and Michael Heeney)
- 2015: Chris Stapleton - Traveller (Mercury Nashville) - track 6, "Nobody to Blame" (co-written with Chris Stapleton and Barry Bales); track 7, "More of You" (co-written with Stapleton); track 13, "Outlaw State of Mind" (co-written with Stapleton and Jerry Salley)
- 2016: Irene Kelley - These Hills (Mountain Fever) - track 4, "Johnson's Hardware Store" (co-written with Irene Kelley)
- 2016: Josh Williams - Modern Day Man (Rounder) - track 2, "Modern Day Man" (co-written with Robbie Melton and Thom Shepherd); track 5, "Let It Go" (co-written with Jerry Douglas)

=== As producer ===
- 1996: Wyatt Rice and Santa Cruz Picture in a Tear (Rounder)
- 2004: Melonie Cannon - Melonie Cannon (Skaggs Family)
- 2007: Steep Canyon Rangers ‘’Lovin’ Pretty Women’’ (Rebel)

=== Also appears on ===
- 1989: Lost & Found - New Day (Rebel)
- 1997: John Fogerty - Blue Moon Swamp (Warner Bros.)
- 2000: Dan Tyminski - Carry Me Across the Mountain (Doobie Shea)
- 2002: Rickie Simpkins - Don't Fret It (Doobie Shea)
- 2003: Shawn Lane - All for Today (Rebel)
- 2005: Larry Sparks - 40 (Rebel)
- 2006: Jim VanCleve - No Apologies (Rural Rhythm)
- 2008: Melonie Cannon - And the Wheel Turns (Rural Rhythm)
- 2009: Adam Steffey - One More for the Road (Sugar Hill)
- 2011: Sierra Hull - Daybreak (Rounder)
- 2013: Alan Bibey and Wayne Benson - The Mandolin Chronicles (Pinecastle)
- 2013: Alan Jackson - The Bluegrass Album (EMI Nashville)
- 2016: Loretta Lynn - Full Circle (Legacy)
- 2016: Loretta Lynn - White Christmas Blue (Legacy)
- 2016: Junior Sisk and Ramblers Choice - Poor Boy's Pleasure (Mountain Fever)
- 2017: Mac Wiseman - I Sang the Song (Mountain Fever)
