= Donna Hughes (musician) =

American singer-songwriter

Donna Lynne Hughes is an American country bluegrass singer, songwriter, guitarist, pianist, and animal rights activist.

== Career ==
She has released several albums on Rounder Records and one of her songs has been recorded by Alison Krauss. Her second album, Gaining Wisdom (2007), was produced by bluegrass guitar legend Tony Rice and third album (2010) by the legendary banjo performer J.D. Crowe. In August 2014, Donna Hughes produced and released two albums on her own label Running Dog Records: From The Heart, where she wrote 19 of the 21 tracks and a piano album. Fly, writing 8 of the 12 tracks.
