= Sugar Hill Records (bluegrass label) =

American record label

- Parent company: Concord (2015-2026); BMG Rights Management (2026-present)
- Founded: 1978
- Founder: Barry Poss; David Freeman
- Distributor: Universal Music Group
- Genre: Americana, bluegrass
- Country of origin: U.S.
- Location: Nashville, Tennessee
- Official website: concord.com/labels/sugar-hill-records/

Sugar Hill Records is an American bluegrass and Americana record label.

It was founded in Durham, North Carolina, in 1978 by Barry Poss and David Freeman, the owner of County Records and Rebel Records. Poss acquired full control of Sugar Hill in 1980 and owned the label until 1998, when he sold it to the Welk Music Group, owner of Vanguard Records. Poss stayed on as president, and in 2002 was promoted to chairman. In 2006, Poss won a Lifetime Achievement Award from the Americana Music Association. In 2008, Welk Music Group appointed EMI as distributor of its labels including Sugar Hill. Sugar Hill continued to operate from Durham N.C. until 2007, when Poss moved the label to Nashville, Tennessee. In 2015 the label was acquired by Concord Bicycle Music.

Among the many notable artists who have released albums on the label are Nickel Creek, Doc Watson, Townes Van Zandt, Ricky Skaggs, Guy Clark, Robert Earl Keen, Sam Bush and Dolly Parton. One of Parton's albums for Sugar Hill, Halos & Horns (2002), included a song called "Sugar Hill", which she wrote as a tribute to the label.

Founder Barry Poss was inducted into the International Bluegrass Music Hall of Fame in 2026.

== Grammy Awards for Best Bluegrass Album ==
- 1992 – Spring Training, Carl Jackson and John Starling
- 1994 – Waitin' for the Hard Times to Go, Nashville Bluegrass Band
- 1995 – The Great Dobro Sessions, Jerry Douglas and Tut Taylor (producers)
- 1996 – Unleashed, Nashville Bluegrass Band
- 1997 – True Life Blues: The Songs of Bill Monroe, Todd Phillips (producer)
- 2001 – The Grass Is Blue, Dolly Parton, Steve Buckingham (producer) and Gary Paczosa (engineer/mixer); Parton's first release on the label
- 2006 – The Company We Keep, Del McCoury Band

== Other Grammys ==
- 2002 – "Shine", from Little Sparrow, Dolly Parton, Best Female Country Vocal Performance
- 2003 – This Side, Nickel Creek, Alison Krauss (producer), and Gary Paczosa (engineer/mixer), Best Contemporary Folk Album
- 2006 – Fiddler's Green, Tim O'Brien, Best Traditional Folk Album
- 2007 – "Whiskey Before Breakfast", from Not Too Far from the Tree, Bryan Sutton and Doc Watson, Best Country Instrumental Performance
- 2010 – "Hummingbyrd" from Ghost Train: The Studio B Sessions, Marty Stuart, Best Country Instrumental Performance
- 2016 — Undercurrent, Sarah Jarosz, Best Folk Album

== Roster ==
- Terry Allen
- Acoustic Syndicate
- Pat Alger
- Mike Auldridge
- Austin Lounge Lizards
- Bad Livers
- Riley Baugus
- Black Prairie
- Byron Berline
- Alan Bibey
- Blue Rose
- Boone Creek
- Sarah Borges
- Ronnie Bowman
- John C. Reilly
- Brother Boys
- Clarence "Gatemouth" Brown
- Sam Bush
- BlueRidge
- California
- Chesapeake
- Guy Clark
- Dudley Connell
- Country Gentlemen
- John Cowan
- Dan Crary
- Mike Cross
- Rodney Crowell
- The Deep Dark Woods
- Grey DeLisle
- Don Dixon
- Donna the Buffalo
- Jerry Douglas
- Casey Driessen
- John Duffey
- The Duhks
- Jonathan Edwards
- Sara Evans
- Jeff Bridges
- Cathy Fink
- Front Range
- The Gibson Brothers
- Good Ol' Persons
- The Gourds
- Pat Green
- The Greencards
- David Grisman
- Aubrey Haynie
- Chris Hillman
- Hot Rize
- Randy Howard
- Walter Hyatt
- Infamous Stringdusters
- Carl Jackson
- Wanda Jackson
- Sarah Jarosz
- Jewel
- Joey + Rory
- Marti Jones
- Kathy Kallick
- Robert Earl Keen
- King Mackerel
- Kukuruza
- Barbara Lamb
- Sonny Landreth
- Grey Larsen
- Laurel Canyon Ramblers
- Doyle Lawson & Quicksilver
- Albert Lee
- Lonesome River Band
- Lonesome Standard Time
- Mike Marshall & Chris Thile
- Kathy Mattea
- Del McCoury Band
- James McMurtry
- Metamora
- Scott Miller
- Jim Mills
- Moe
- Allison Moorer
- Jimmy Murphy
- Mutual Admiration Society
- Nashville Bluegrass Band
- Bobbie Nelson
- Willie Nelson
- Tara Nevins
- New Grass Revival
- Nickel Creek
- Mollie O'Brien
- Tim O'Brien
- Maura O'Connell
- Osborne Brothers
- David Parmley
- Dolly Parton
- Tom Paxton
- Johnny Paycheck
- Herb Pedersen
- Positive Force
- Dirk Powell
- Psychograss
- Railroad Earth
- Ranch Romance
- Reckless Kelly
- Red Clay Ramblers
- Red Stick Ramblers
- Lou Reid
- Tony Rice
- Don Rigsby
- Peter Rowan
- Kevin Russell's Junker
- Martha Scanlan
- Darrell Scott
- Seldom Scene
- Sammy Shelor
- Ricky Skaggs
- Connie Smith
- Corey Smith
- Kenny Smith
- John Starling
- Marty Stuart
- Bryan Sutton
- Sweethearts of the Rodeo
- Chris Thile
- Trapezoid
- Greg Trooper
- Uncle Kracker
- Uncle Walt's Band
- Sally Van Meter
- Townes Van Zandt
- Sean Watkins
- Doc Watson
- Merle Watson
- Don Williams
- Brian Wright
- Lee Ann Womack (Former, transferred to ATO Records)

== See also ==
- List of record labels
- Welk Music Group
  - Ranwood Records
  - Vanguard Records
- 1978 in music
- 1998 in music
