= Tim Austin (musician) =

American singer-songwriter

- Genre: Bluegrass
- Occupations: Founding member, Lonesome River Band; Founder, Doobie Shea Records

Tim Austin is an American musician and former founding member of the Lonesome River Band. He is also the founder of Doobie Shea Records, a record label he ran from 1988 until 2004. In addition to the Lonesome River Band, he performed with numerous artists, including Marty Raybon.

== Career ==
As a young musician in the late 1970s, Austin was traveling with the Bluegrass Cardinals, selling records, tapes and merchandise for the band at concerts. During his time with the Bluegrass Cardinals, he met musician Buck Green who pitched a song to the group's founder Don Parmley. Parmley requested a copy of the song but Green never sent it to him. Austin later asked Green to send him the song which was one of the first releases for The Lonesome River Band, a group formed by Austin in 1982. The group released its debut album in 1985 and Austin left the group in 1995 to focus on his record label, Doobie Shea Records.

=== Lonesome River Band ===
The Lonesome River Band is an American contemporary bluegrass band, founded by Tim Austin in 1982. The band has released 15 recording projects since its formation and has experienced numerous personnel changes over the years, and has not included an original member since Tim Austin left the band in 1995 to focus on Doobie Shea Records.

=== Doobie Shea Records ===
Doobie Shea Records was a record label founded by Tim Austin in 1988 and featured independent bluegrass artists. The label ran from its inception in 1988 until it was shut down by Austin in 2004. Artists who have recorded on the label included Dale Ann Bradley, Marty Raybon, Dan Tyminski, the Lonesome River Band, and Mountain Heart. It was based in Boones Mill, Virginia and distributed by Select-O-Hits. The label's first critically acclaimed project was the Stanley Tradition, nominated for a Grammy Award for Best Bluegrass Album and an IBMA award. Shortly after the release of the group's first album, the label's studio burned down. The studio then moved from Ferrum in Virginia to Boones Mill.

== Discography ==
For discography as a member of a group, see Lonesome River Band.

=== Albums ===
As supporting artist

Year	Title	Artist	Role
2012	Foggy Mountain Special: A Bluegrass Tribute to Earl Scruggs	Earl Scruggs	Engineer, Mixing, Producer
2012	Southern Roots & Branches (Yesterday and Today)	Marty Raybon	Engineer, Mixing
2008	Gardens in the Sky	James King	Guitar
2008	Wheels	Dan Tyminski	Audio engineer, Mixing
2007	Footprints: IIIrd Tyme Out Collection	IIIrd Tyme Out	Engineer
2007	Original Fire	Speedfinger	Vocals
