= Adam Steffey =

American mandolin player (born 1965)

- Born: Adam Carter Steffey; November 24, 1965 (age 60); Norfolk, Virginia, United States
- Occupations: Musician, singer-songwriter, producer, bandleader
- Instruments: Mandolin, vocals
- Years active: 1987–present
- Labels: Mountain Home Records, Organic Records, Sugar Hill Records

Adam Carter Steffey (born November 24, 1965) is an American mandolin player, best known for playing in the bluegrass and old-time styles. He spent time as a member of bands such as Alison Krauss & Union Station, Mountain Heart, Lonesome River Band, the Dan Tyminski Band, the Boxcars, and the Isaacs. He was most recently a member of the Highland Travelers, which announced on November 15, 2018, that they were disbanding, with Steffey pursuing an alternative profession other than music. However, his retirement from music was short-lived, as he joined the band Volume Five just a few months later. Steffey has also performed with such artists as Kenny Chesney, Clint Black, Vince Gill, Dolly Parton, the Dixie Chicks, James Taylor, Rhonda Vincent, Ronnie Bowman, and Jim Mills.

== Biography ==
Steffey grew up in Norfolk, Virginia, but moved to Kingsport, Tennessee, when his father retired in 1975. He attended the Carter Family Fold each weekend when he was young, and became interested in the music he heard there. He started playing the mandolin when he was 15, taking lessons first from Audey Ratliff and later on from Jack Tottle.

Steffey completed his Bachelor of Science at ETSU in 2014. He served as an adjunct faculty member teaching mandolin at East Tennessee State University.

== Personal life ==
Steffey married musician Tina Trianosky in May 2008, and they have twin sons, Andrew and Riley, born in 2011.

== Awards ==
Steffey is a five-time Grammy Award winner and has won the bluegrass mandolin player of the year from the International Bluegrass Music Association eleven times, more than any other player.

== Selected discography ==
- (2001) Grateful (Mountain Home Records)
- (2009) One More for the Road (Sugar Hill)
- (2013) New Primitive (Organic)
- (2016) Here to Stay (Mountain Home)

Also performed on:

- (2013) It's Just a Road (The Boxcars)
- (2013) Life on a Rock (Kenny Chesney)
- (2013) The Bluegrass Album (Alan Jackson)
- (2012) All In (The Boxcars)
- (2008) Wheels (Dan Tyminski)
- (2008) Good Thing Going (Rhonda Vincent)
- (2008) Secrets (Sierra Hull)
- (2007) DoorWay (Ron Block)
- (2006) Wide Open (Mountain Heart)
- (2005) First Time Around (Aaron McDaris)
- (2005) Hide Head Blues (Jim Mills)
- (2005) Some Hearts (Carrie Underwood)
- (2002) Home (Dixie Chicks)
- (2002) My Dixie Home (Jim Mills)
- (2001) Stand Still (The Isaacs)
- (2000) Carry Me Across the Mountain (Dan Tyminski)
- (1997) Nothin' But the Taillights (Clint Black)
- (1997) So Long So Wrong (Alison Krauss & Union Station)
- (1996) High Lonesome Sound (Vince Gill)
- (1996) Treasures (Dolly Parton)
- (1994) I Know Who Holds Tomorrow (Alison Krauss)
- (1993) World Turning (Tony Trischka)
- (1992) Every Time You Say Goodbye (Alison Krauss & Union Station)
- (1991) Arkansas Traveler (Michelle Shocked)
- (1989) Dusty Miller (Dusty Miller)
