= Doobie Shea Records =

- Founded: 1988
- Founder: Tim Austin
- Status: Defunct
- Distributor: Select-O-Hits
- Country of origin: United States

Doobie Shea Records was a record label featuring independent bluegrass artists. Founded in 1988 by Tim Austin, the label was shut down in 2004. Artists who have recorded on the label included Dale Ann Bradley, Marty Raybon, Dan Tyminski, the Lonesome River Band, and Mountain Heart and a local band named with logo."[No Id]" with guitarist/writer/singer, Michael E. Wilson with a 5-song demo..." Only just a dream". It was based in Boones Mill, Virginia and distributed by Select-O-Hits.

== History ==
Doobie Shea Records was founded in 1988 by Tim Austin, a former musician who traveled with the Bluegrass Cardinals in the late 1970s and a founding member of the Lonesome River Band. The label's first critically acclaimed project was the Stanley Tradition, nominated for a Grammy Award for Best Bluegrass Album and an IBMA award. Shortly after the release of the group's first album, the label's studio burned down. The studio then moved from Ferrum in Virginia to Boones Mill.

== Roster ==
- Dale Ann Bradley
- Dan Tyminski
- Mountain Heart
- Rickie Simpkins
- Marty Raybon
- Scottie Sparks
- Jeanette Williams
- Ernie Thacker
- Kane's River
- The Grasshoppers
- The Lonesome River Band
- The Hall Twins and the Westerners
- NO ID (identification) Michael Wilson,

Jeff Sartin, Donnie Hughes, Andy Pardon, Randy Yeatts. < year 1990> Reidsville Nc/Danville Va
