= Lonesome River Band =

American contemporary bluegrass band

- Origin: Meadows of Dan, Virginia, United States
- Genres: Bluegrass, Folk
- Years active: 1982–present
- Members: Mike Hartgrove; Jesse Smathers; Barry Reed; Brandon Rickman; Sammy Shelor; Derrick Clifton
- Past members: Mike Jones; Tim Austin; Jerry McMillan; Steve Thomas; Rick Williams; Jeff Midkiff; Billy Wheeler; Randy Driskill; Adam Steffey; Brian Fesler; Dan Tyminski; Dale Perry; John Green; Ronnie Bowman; Steve Dilling; Darrell Webb; Don Rigsby; Kenny Smith; Rickie Simpkins; Jeff Parker; Irl Hees; John Wade; Shannon Slaughter; Barry Berrier; Matt Leadbetter; Mike Anglin; Andy Ball; Mike Jones; Randy Jones
- Website: www.lonesomeriverband.com

The Lonesome River Band is an American contemporary bluegrass band. The band has released 15 recording projects since its formation in 1982. Lonesome River Band is led by Sammy Shelor who is a member of the Virginia Country Music Hall of Fame and a 5-Time International Bluegrass Music Association Banjo Player of the Year Award recipient. The band has experienced numerous personnel changes over the years, and has not included an original member since Tim Austin left the band in 1995 to focus on Doobie Shea Records.

On November 11, 2011, band member Sammy Shelor was awarded the Steve Martin Prize for Excellence in Bluegrass and Banjo. Shelor was presented with the award on the Late Show with David Letterman. Following the presentation of the award, Steve Martin performed with the Lonesome River Band.

== Members ==
Current members

- Sammy Shelor — banjo, backing vocals (1990–present)
- Mike Hartgrove — fiddle (2001–2005, 2008–present)
- Jesse Smathers — mandolin, vocals (2015–2021); guitar, vocals (2021–present)
- Adam Miller — mandolin, vocals (2021–present)
- Kameron Keller — bass, backing vocals (2021–present)

== Discography ==
=== Albums ===
Title	Album details	Peak positions
Title	Album details	US Bluegrass
I Guess Heartaches Are in Style This Year	Release date: 1985; Label: Shar-Lin	—
The Lonesome River Band	Release date: 1986; Label: Rebel Records	—
Saturday Night – Sunday Morning	Release date: 1988; Label: Rebel Records	—
Looking for Yourself	Release date: 1989; Label: Rebel Records	—
Carrying the Tradition	Release date: 1991; Label: Rebel Records	—
Old Country Town	Release date: January 25, 1994; Label: Sugar Hill Records	—
One Step Forward	Release date: March 19, 1996; Label: Sugar Hill Records	—
Finding the Way	Release date: August 18, 1998; Label: Sugar Hill Records	—
Talkin to Myself	Release date: June 20, 2000; Label: Sugar Hill Records	—
Window of Time	Release date: August 27, 2002; Label: Doobie Shea Records	—
Head on into Heartache	Release date: May 17, 2005; Label: Mountain Home	—
The Road with No End	Release date: July 25, 2006; Label: Mountain Home	—
No Turning Back	Release date: September 9, 2008; Label: Rural Rhythm	—
Still Learning	Release date: July 13, 2010; Label: Rural Rhythm Records	8
Chronology, Volume 1	Release date: February 28, 2012; Label: Rural Rhythm Records	10
Chronology, Volume 2	Release date: July 3, 2012; Label: Rural Rhythm Records	—
Chronology, Volume 3	Release date: October 16, 2012; Label: Rural Rhythm Records	—
Turn on a Dime	Release date: October 28, 2014; Label: Mountain Home	9
Coming back home to you	Release date: August 14, 2015; Label: Mountain Home	—
Bridging the Tradition	Release date: March 18, 2016; Label: Mountain Home	2
Mayhayley's House	Release date: June 23, 2017; Label: Mountain Home	—
Outside Looking In	Release date: May 24, 2019; Label: Mountain Home	—
Heyday	Release date: May 28, 2022; Label: Mountain Home	—
"—" denotes releases that did not chart
