= Ron Stewart (bluegrass) =

American singer-songwriter (born 1968)

- Born: December 11, 1968 (age 57); Paoli, Indiana, U.S.
- Genre: Bluegrass music
- Occupation: Musician
- Instruments: Fiddle, guitar, banjo, mandolin
- Years active: 1977–present
- Website: ronniestewart.com

Ron Stewart is an American multi-instrumentalist in the bluegrass tradition. He plays fiddle, guitar, banjo, and mandolin, and has won the International Bluegrass Music Association (IBMA) award for Fiddle Player of the Year in 2000 and Banjo Player of the Year in 2011.

== Biography ==
=== Early years ===
Ron Stewart was born on December 11, 1968, in Paoli, Indiana. Stewart began playing fiddle at age 3 and at age 9, Stewart made several guest appearances with Lester Flatt, and appeared on one of his live albums. From 1977 until 1990, Stewart ("Little Ronnie Stewart"), played in the Stewart Family Band with his parents.

=== Recording and performing career ===
==== Curly Seckler ====
Stewart began working with Curly Seckler in 1989, and recorded two albums with him: Tribute to Lester Flatt and Bluegrass Gospel.

==== Gary Brewer and the Kentucky Ramblers ====
From 1991 until 1994, Stewart was a member of Gary Brewer and the Kentucky Ramblers. Other members included Bill Colwell (mandolin) and Dale "Punch" Taylor (bass).

==== Lynn Morris Band ====
From 1997 until 2003, Stewart played banjo, guitar, and fiddle with the Lynn Morris Band. The band included Morris (guitar, vocals, banjo), Marshall Wilborn (bass), Jesse Brock (mandolin), and Stewart (fiddle).

==== Time Stands Still ====
In 2001, Stewart released Time Stands Still, his first solo album in 22 years. Lynn Morris produced, and guest artists included Dudley Connell (guitar), Sammy Shelor (banjo), Rob Ickes (resophonic guitar), and Marshall Wilborn (bass).

==== J. D. Crowe and the New South ====
In 2003, Stewart joined J. D. Crowe and the New South, which also included Rickey Wasson (guitar, vocals), Dwight McCall (mandolin, vocals), and Harold Nixon (bass).

==== Dan Tyminski Band ====
Stewart joined the Dan Tyminski Band in 2007 along with Adam Steffey (mandolin), Barry Bales (bass), and Justin Moses (resonator guitar).

==== Longview ====
2008, Stewart recorded and performed with Longview, along with Marshall Wilborn (bass), Don Rigsby (mandolin), James King (vocals), Lou Reid (guitar), and J. D. Crowe (banjo) for the album Deep In The Mountains.

==== The Boxcars ====
In 2009, Stewart formed the Boxcars with Adam Steffey (mandolin), John Bowman (guitar, fiddle, banjo), Keith Garrett (guitar, vocals), and Harold Nixon (bass). 2011 IBMA Emerging Artist and Instrumental Group of the Year.

==== The Seldom Scene ====
In 2017, the Boxcars disbanded, and Stewart joined the Seldom Scene, replacing Rickie Simpkins.

=== Awards ===
Stewart won the IBMA award for Fiddle Player of the Year in 2000 and the IBMA Award for Banjo Player of the Year in 2011.

=== Instruments ===
Warren Yates produces the Ron Stewart Signature Series Banjo, designed to look and sound like a 1933 banjo.

Stewart and his father Frank re-voice, restore, and repair acoustic stringed instruments, and they build violins under the name F&R Stewart Violins.

== Discography ==
=== Solo albums ===
- 1979: Talkin' Fiddle Blues (Programme Audio) as Fiddlin' Ronnie Stewart
- 1982: Walking In The Moonlight (Old Homestead) as Fiddlin' Ronnie Stewart and the Stewart Family
- 2001: Time Stands Still (Rounder)

=== With Curly Seckler with Willis Spears ===
- 1989: Tribute to Lester Flatt (Rebel)
- 1989: Bluegrass Gospel (Rich-R-Tone)

=== With Gary Brewer ===
- 1996: Guitar (Copper Creek)
- 1996: Nearing Jordan's Crossing (Copper Creek)

=== The Lynn Morris Band ===
- 1999: You'll Never Be the Sun (Rounder)
- 2003: Shape of a Tear (Rounder)

=== With J. D. Crowe and the New South ===
- 2007: Lefty's Old Guitar (Rounder)

=== With Longview ===
- 2008: Deep in the Mountains (Rounder)

=== With the Boxcars ===
- 2010: The Boxcars (Mountain Home)
- 2012: All In (Mountain Home)
- 2013: It’s Just a Road (Mountain Home)
- 2016: Familiar With The Ground (Mountain Home)

=== As producer ===
- 2004: John Lawless - Five & Dime (Copper Creek)
- 2004: Jeff Parker - Two Roads to Travel (Lonesome Day)
- 2005: Darrell Webb - Behind the Scenes (Lonesome Day)
- 2007: Tommy Webb - Eastern Kentucky (Kindred)
- 2008: Rickey Wasson - From the Heart and Soul (Rural Rhythm)
- 2009: Tommy Webb - Heartland (Rural Rhythm)

=== Also appears on ===
==== 1985 - 2001 ====
- 1985: Tony Trischka - Hill Country (Rounder)
- 1997: Chris Jones - No One But You (Rebel)
- 1998: Hazel Dickens - Heart of a Singer (Rounder)
- 1999: Chris Jones - Follow Your Heart (Rebel)
- 1999: Marshall Wilborn - Root 5: Bass and Banjo (Pinecastle)
- 2000: Front Range - Silent Ground (Sugar Hill)
- 2000: Chris Jones - Just A Drifter (Rebel)
- 2000: Don Rigsby - Empty Old Mailbox (Sugar Hill)
- 2000: Herschel Sizemore - My Style (Hay Holler)
- 2000: Dan Tyminski - Carry Me Across the Mountain (Doobie Shea)
- 2000: Rhonda Vincent - Back Home Again (Rounder)
- 2001: Audie Blaylock - Trains Are the Only Way to Fly (self-released)
- 2001: Dale Ann Bradley - Cumberland River Dreams (Doobie Shea)
- 2001: Mike Burns - Walk the Water's Edge (North Co Music)
- 2001: Sally Jones - Love Hurts (self-released)
- 2001: Kathy Kallick - My Mother's Voice (Copper Creek)
- 2001: Adam Steffey - Grateful (Mountain Home)
- 2001: Ginny Hawker - Letters From My Father (Rounder)
- 2001: Rhonda Vincent - The Storm Still Rages (Rounder)

==== 2002 - 2004 ====
- 2002: Chris Jones - Few Words (Rebel)
- 2002: The Special Consensus - Route 10 (Pinecastle)
- 2002: Ernie Thacker - Chill of Lonesome (Doobie Shea)
- 2002: Josh Williams - Now That You're Gone (Pinecastle)
- 2002: Baucom, Bibey and BlueRidge - Come Along with Me (Sugar Hill)
- 2002: Ronnie Bowman - Starting Over (Sugar Hill)
- 2002: Jesse Brock - Kickin' Grass (Pinecastle)
- 2002: Special Consensus - Route 10 (Pinecastle)
- 2003: Wayne Benson - An Instrumental Anthology (Pinecastle)
- 2003: Jeannie Kendall - Jeannie Kendall (Rounder)
- 2003: Larry Stephenson Band - Clinch Mountain Mystery (Pinecastle)
- 2003: Jimmy Sturr - Let's Polka 'Round (Rounder)
- 2004: Ginny Hawker and Tracy Schwarz - Draw Closer (Rounder)
- 2004: Josh Williams - Lonesome Highway (Pinecastle)

==== 2005 - 2009 ====
- 2005: Clay Jones - Mountain Tradition (Rural Rhythm)
- 2005: Blue Moon Rising - On the Rise (Lonesome Day)
- 2005: Lou Reid - Time (Lonesome Day)
- 2005: Jordan Tice - No Place Better (Patuxent Music)
- 2006: New River Line - Chasing My Dreams (Kindred)
- 2006: Bradley Walker - Highway of Dreams (Rounder)
- 2006: Jim VanCleve - No Apologies (Rural Rhythm)
- 2007: Steve Gulley - Sounds Like Home (Lonesome Day)
- 2007: Donna Hughes - Gaining Wisdom (Rounder)
- 2007: Dwight Mccall - Never Say Never Again (Rural Rhythm)
- 2007: Larry Sparks - The Last Suit You Wear (McCoury Music)
- 2007: Tony Trischka - Double Banjo Bluegrass Spectacular (Rounder)
- 2008: Blue Moon Rising - One Lonely Shadow (Lonesome Day)
- 2008: David Parmley and Continental Divide - Three Silver Dollars
- 2008: Kenny and Amanda Smith - Live And Learn (Rebel)
- 2008: Dan Tyminski - Wheels (Rounder)
- 2008: Rhonda Vincent - Good Thing Going (Rounder)
- 2009: Lou Reid and Carolina - My Own Set of Rules (Rural Rhythm)
- 2009: Adam Steffey - One More for the Road (Sugar Hill)

==== 2010 - present ====
- 2010: J. D. Crowe, Doyle Lawson, and Paul Williams - Old Friends Get Together (Mountain Home)
- 2010: Steve Gulley and Tim Stafford - Dogwood Winter (Rural Rhythm)
- 2010: Brand New Strings - No Strings Attached (Rural Rhythm)
- 2010: Lou Reid and Carolina - Sounds Like Heaven To Me (Rural Rhythm)
- 2011: Sierra Hull - Daybreak (Rounder)
- 2011: Charlie Sizemore - Heartache Looking for a Home (Rounder)
- 2011: Larry Sparks - Almost Home (Rounder)
- 2012: American Drive - American Drive (Rural Rhythm)
- 2012: Richard Bennett - Last Train from Poor Valley's (Lonesome Day)
- 2012: Carrie Hassler - Distance (Rural Rhythm)
- 2012: Lou Reid and Carolina - Callin' Me Back Home (Kama)
- 2012: Kenny and Amanda Smith - Catch Me If I Try (Farm Boy)
- 2012: The Spinney Brothers - Memories (Mountain Fever)
- 2013: James King - Three Chords and the Truth (Rounder)
- 2013: Nu-Blu - Ten (Rural Rhythm)
- 2013: The Spinney Brothers - No Borders (Mountain Fever)
- 2014: Richard Bennett - In the Wind Somewhere (Lonesome Day)
- 2014: Steve Gulley - Family, Friends & Fellowship (Rural Rhythm)
- 2014: Nu-Blu - All the Way (Rural Rhythm)
- 2015: John Bowman - Beautiful Ashes (Mountain Home)
- 2016: Rickey Wasson - Croweology - The Study of J.D. Crowe's Musical Legacy (Truegrass)

=== Music instruction ===
- 2010 Ron Stewart: A Bluegrass Banjo Professional DVD (Mel Bay)
- 2011: Ron Stewart: The Fiddlers of Flatt and Scruggs DVD (AcuTab)
- 2011: Ron Stewart: Playing Fiddle in the Bluegrass Style DVD (AcuTab)
