= David McLaughlin (musician) =

American multi-instrumentalist (born 1958)

- Born: February 13, 1958 (age 68); Washington, D.C.
- Genres: Bluegrass music
- Occupation: Musician
- Instruments: Mandolin, fiddle, guitar, drums, banjo, 1923 Loar F5 mandolin
- Years active: 1978–present

David McLaughlin is an American multi-instrumentalist. His mandolin prowess has helped clarify how Bill Monroe's style of playing can be applied to progressive bluegrass music.

== Biography ==
McLaughlin was raised in the Washington D.C. area and now lives in Winchester, Virginia. He is the son of Nancy and Bill McLaughlin, who inspired his eclectic music tastes with their enthusiasm for blues and jazz. He is the younger brother of Peter McLaughlin, who sings and plays guitar with Laurie Lewis. He was also active in the jazz, classical, and rock and roll scene around D.C., playing guitar and drums as well as mandolin and fiddle.

=== Johnson Mountain Boys ===
In 1978, McLaughlin founded the Johnson Mountain Boys with Dudley Connell (vocals, guitar), Richie Underwood (banjo), Eddie Stubbs (fiddle), and Larry Robbins (bass). McLaughlin first played fiddle, then switched to mandolin.

During this time, McLaughlin also occasionally played fiddle with the band Patent Pending, which included Eldred Hill (mandolin), Rusty Williams (guitar), and Jim Steptoe (banjo).

=== Lynn Morris Band ===
McLaughlin joined the Lynn Morris Band in time to play mandolin and guitar on their 1992 album The Bramble and the Rose along with Tom Adams and Marshall Wilborn. In 1999, Jesse Brock replaced McLaughlin on mandolin.

=== Josh Crowe and David McLaughlin ===
In 1993, McLaughlin formed a duo with guitarist Josh Crowe of the Crowe Brothers when Wayne Crowe took time off. Crowe and McLaughlin released one album Going Back on Rounder Records. They played and toured together for five years, singing Appalachian brother style harmonies.

=== Springfield Exit and the Stony Point Quartet ===
McLaughlin currently performs with the band Springfield Exit, which also includes vocalist Linda Lay, guitarist David Lay, bassist Marshall Wilborn, and Tom Adams on banjo. Their debut album, That Was Then was released in 2015.

The Stony Point Quartet, featuring McLaughlin, Linda Lay, Billy Lux (bass), and Dudley Connell (guitar) often plays the same events as Springfield Exit, with a focus on gospel music.

=== Music instruction ===
McLaughlin has produced an instructional video for The Murphy Method, and has hosted a Murphy Method Banjo Camp.

=== Personal life ===
In 2006, McLaughlin suffered a severe hearing loss.

McLaughlin also runs a bed and breakfast in Winchester called the Nancy Shepherd House.

== Discography ==
=== With The Johnson Mountain Boys ===
- 1981: The Johnson Mountain Boys (Rounder)
- 1982: Walls of Time (Rounder)
- 1983: Working Close (Rounder)
- 1984: Live at the Birchmere (Rounder)
- 1985: We'll Still Sing On (Rounder)
- 1987: Let the Whole World Talk (Rounder)
- 1988: Requests (Rounder)
- 2002: At the Old Schoolhouse (Rounder)

=== With The McCoury Brothers ===
- 1987: The McCoury Brothers (Rounder)

=== Josh Crowe and David McLaughlin ===
- 1993: Going Back (Rounder)

=== With the Lynn Morris Band ===
- 1992: The Bramble and the Rose (Rounder)
- 1995: Mama's Hand (Rounder)
- 1999: You'll Never Be the Sun (Rounder)
- 2003: Shape of a Tear (Rounder)

=== With Springfield Exit ===
- 2003: Springfield Exit (Cracker Barrel)
- 2015: That Was Then (Patuxent Music)

=== With Stony Point ===
- 2003: Band of Angels (Cracker Barrel)

=== Music instruction ===
- 1991: Learn Bluegrass by Ear VHS, reissued on DVD (Murphy Method)

=== Also appears on ===
- 1983: Phyllis Boyens - I Really Care (Rounder)
- 1983: Hazel Dickens - By the Sweat of My Brow (Rounder)
- 1983: James King - These Old Pictures (Rounder)
- 1984: Delia Bell and Bill Grant - The Cheer of the Home Fires (Rounder)
- 1985: Tony Trischka - Hill Country (Rounder)
- 1985: Delia Bell and Bill Grant - A Few Dollars More (Rounder)
- 1986: Gloria Belle - Love of the Mountains (Webco)
- 1988: Delia Bell and Bill Grant - Following a Feeling (Rounder)
- 1990: Tom Adams - Right Hand Man (Rounder)
- 1995: James King - Lonesome and Then Some (Rounder)
- 1995: Tony Trischka - Glory Shone Around: A Christmas Collection (Rounder)
- 1995: Robin and Linda Williams and Their Fine Group - Good News (Sugar Hill)
- 1997: Delia Bell and Bill Grant - Dreaming (Rounder)
- 1999: Bob Amos - Wherever I Go (Hayden's Ferry)
- 1999: Marshall Wilborn - Root 5: Bass and Banjo (Pinecastle)
- 2002: Jesse Brock - Kickin' Grass (Pinecastle)
- 2006: Patrick McAvinue - Grave Run (Patuxent)
- 2007: House Of Fools - Live and Learn (Drive-Thru Records)
