= Marshall Wilborn =

American musician (born 1952)

- Born: March 12, 1952 (age 74); Austin, Texas, U.S.
- Genres: Bluegrass music
- Occupations: Musician, composer
- Instruments: Bass, vocals, banjo
- Years active: 1982–present
- Labels: Pinecastle, Rounder
- Formerly of: Johnson Mountain Boys, Longview, Michael Cleveland and Flamekeeper, Lynn Morris Band

Marshall Wilborn is an American bluegrass music bass player and composer best known for his work with the Johnson Mountain Boys, Longview, Michael Cleveland and Flamekeeper, and the Lynn Morris Band.

== Biography ==
=== Early years ===
Wilborn was raised in Austin, Texas. He first played banjo, but because so many of his friends also preferred the banjo, Wilborn learned to play the bass.

In 1981, Wilborn met Lynn Morris at a jam session in Austin. In 1982, when the bassist position opened in Morris's Pennsylvania band Whetstone Run, Wilborn took the job. Besides Morris and Wilborn, the band included Lee Olsen (mandolin) and Mike Gorrell (guitar). Wilborn stayed with Whetstone Run until 1986.

In 1986, Wilborn spent several months playing in Jimmy Martin's Sunny Mountain Boys. Then he received an invitation to join the Johnson Mountain Boys, replacing bassist Larry Robbins.

=== Lynn Morris Band ===
Wilborn co-founded the Lynn Morris band in 1988, and in 1989 Wilborn and Morris wed. The group had to disband following Lynn Morris’ stroke in 2003. They released their first album Lynn Morris Band in 1990; Bramble and the Rose in 1992; Mama’s Hand in 1995, You’ll Never Be the Sun in 1999, and Shape of a Tear in 2003. Morris suffered a stroke in 2003, effectively disbanding the group. Her recovery has been slow but steady, and she reunited with her band on stage in 2011.

=== Root 5 ===
In 1999, Wilborn released Root 5, an album of bass instrumentals accompanied by banjo. Wilborn played bass and banjo, and was accompanied by Morris, David McLaughlin, Tom Adams, Tony Furtado, Alan Munde, Craig Smith, Ron Stewart, Scott Vestal, and Pete Wernick. Root 5 was nominated for Instrumental Recording of the Year by the International Bluegrass Music Association (IBMA).

=== Longview ===
In 1994, Wilborn formed Longview with Don Rigsby (mandolin), Dudley Connell (guitar), Joe Mullins (banjo), James King (guitar), and Glen Duncan (fiddle).

=== Seneca Rocks! ===
Wilborn, Dudley Connell, Tom Adams, David McLaughlin, and Sally Love Connell formed the band Seneca Rocks! in 2006. All members except Love Connell were previously members of the Johnson Mountain Boys.

=== Flamekeeper ===
Wilborn joined Michael Cleveland and Flamekeeper in 2007, and performed with them until 2011.

=== Springfield Exit ===
Wilborn currently performs with the band Springfield Exit, which also includes vocalist Linda Lay, guitarist David Lay, David McLaughlin on mandolin, and Tom Adams on banjo. Their debut album, That Was Then was released in 2015.

=== Chris Jones & The Night Drivers ===
Wilborn joined Chris Jones & The Night Drivers in late 2019 and is currently playing with them.

=== Music instruction ===
Wilborn has taught the Murphy Method of instruction on DVD for Mel Bay.

=== Awards ===
1998, he was voted Bass Player of the Year by Bluegrass Now Magazine’s Fan’s Choice awards.

Wilborn won the IBMA award for Bass Player of the Year in 2009, 2010, 2011, and 2012.

== Discography ==
=== Solo albums ===
- 1999: Root 5: Bass & Banjo (Pinecastle)

=== With Whetstone Run ===
- 1984: No Use Frettin' (Red Dog)

=== The Johnson Mountain Boys ===
- 1987: Let the Whole World Talk (Rounder)
- 1988: Requests (Rounder)
- 2002: At the Old Schoolhouse (Rounder)

=== With The Lynn Morris Band ===
- 1990: The Lynn Morris Band (Rounder)
- 1992: The Bramble and the Rose (Rounder)
- 1995: Mama's Hand (Rounder)
- 1999: You'll Never Be the Sun (Rounder)
- 2003: Shape of a Tear (Rounder)

=== With Longview ===
- 1997: Longview (Rounder)
- 1999: High Lonesome (Rounder)
- 2002: Lessons in Stone (Rebel)
- 2008: Deep in the Mountains (Rounder)

=== With Michael Cleveland and Flamekeeper ===
- 2009: Leavin' Town' (Rounder)
- 2011: Fired Up (Rounder)

=== With Springfield Exit ===
- 2003: Springfield Exit (Cracker Barrel)
- 2015: That Was Then (Patuxent Music)

=== As composer ===
- 1982: Doyle Lawson and Quicksilver – Quicksilver Rides Again (Sugar Hill) – track 10, "Mountain Girl"
- 1985: Doyle Lawson and Quicksilver – Once & For Always (Sugar Hill) – track 1, "The Blue Road"
- 1994: Alison Krauss and Union Station – Every Time You Say Goodbye (Rounder) – track 7, "Heartstrings"
- 2002: Rhonda Vincent – My Blue Tears (Rebel) – track 8, "Wishing Well Blues"
- 2003: Jeannie Kendall – Jeannie Kendall (Rounder) – track 9, "Wishing Well Blues"
- 2008: Sierra Hull – Secrets (Rounder) – track 8, "That's All I Can Say"
- 2011: Hot Tuna – Steady as She Goes (Red House) – track 4, "Goodbye to the Blues"
- 2011: Russell Johnson – Anytime Anyplace But Only You (New Time) – track 10, "Wishing Well Blues"

=== Also appears on ===
- 1988: Delia Bell and Bill Grant – Following a Feeling (Rounder)
- 1990: Tom Adams – Right Hand Man (Rounder)
- 1993: James King – These Old Pictures (Rounder)
- 1995: Joe Carr – Windy Days And Dusty Skies (Flying Fish)
- 1995: James King – Lonesome and Then Some (Rounder)
- 1998: Hazel Dickens – Heart Of A Singer (Rounder) with Carol Elizabeth Jones and Ginny Hawker
- 1998: Tony Trischka – Glory Shone Around: A Christmas Collection (Rounder)
- 2000: Ron Spears – My Time Has Come (Copper Creek)
- 2001: Ron Stewart – Time Stands Still (Rounder)
- 2002: Jesse Brock – Kickin' Grass (Pinecastle)
- 2007: Patrick McAvinue – Grave Run (Patuxent)
- 2007: Tony Trischka – Double Banjo Bluegrass Spectacular (Rounder)
- 2008: James King – Gardens in the Sky (Rounder)
- 2011: Bill Emerson – Eclipse (Rural Rhythm)
- 2013: Junior Sisk and Joe Mullins – Hall of Fame Bluegrass (Rebel)

=== Music instruction ===
- 2007: The Murphy Method: Learn Bluegrass by Ear: Beginning Bass DVD (Mel Bay)
- 2007: The Murphy Method: Learn Bluegrass by Ear: Intermediate Bass DVD (Mel Bay)
- 2010: The Murphy Method: Learn Bluegrass by Ear: Slap Bass DVD (Mel Bay)
