= Dudley Connell =

American singer (born 1956)

- Born: February 18, 1956 (age 70); Scherr, West Virginia, U.S.
- Genres: Bluegrass music
- Occupation: Musician
- Instruments: Vocals, 1943 Martin D-28 herringbone guitar
- Years active: 1975–present

Dudley Dale Connell (born February 18, 1956) is an American singer in the bluegrass tradition. He is best known for his work with the Johnson Mountain Boys, Longview, and The Seldom Scene.

== Biography ==
=== Early years ===
Connell grew up in Rockville, Maryland. His parents were bluegrass enthusiasts. Connell initially played banjo like his father, but switched to guitar when he realized his strongest asset was his voice. Carter Stanley was a major influence on Connell's singing style.

=== Johnson Mountain Boys ===
In 1975, Connell founded and led the Johnson Mountain Boys, playing guitar and singing lead vocals. Other members included Richard Underwood (banjo), David McLaughlin (mandolin), Eddie Stubbs (fiddle) and Gary B Reid (bass). The band ended in 1988 due to road life stresses, but have since played reunion shows and another album Blue Diamond. Connell and other band members also provided musical support for Buzz Busby.

=== Touring and session work ===
Connell has recorded with Hazel Dickens, and toured with her in 1992.

In 1993, Joe Wilson organized the "Masters of the 5-String Banjo" tour, with Connell, Laurie Lewis, Ralph Stanley, Will Keys, Seleshe Damessae]l, Kirk Sutphin, Tony Ellis, Seamus Eagan, and Carroll Best. Music from this tour was collected and released on the 1994 album Masters of the Banjo on Arhoolie Records.

=== Longview ===
In 1994, Connell formed Longview with Don Rigsby (mandolin), Marshall Wilborn (bass), Joe Mullins (banjo), James King (guitar), and Glen Duncan (fiddle).

=== Seldom Scene ===
In 1995, Connell joined the Seldom Scene, playing guitar and singing lead vocals. He left the band at the beginning of 2025.

=== Dudley Connell and Don Rigsby ===
Connell recorded two albums with Don Rigsby: Meet Me By the Moonlight in 1999 and Another Saturday Night in 2001. They drew on the Appalachian brother style of singing in country music made popular in the early 20th century by groups such as the Blue Sky Boys and the Monroe Brothers.

=== Stony Point Quartet ===
The Stony Point Quartet, featuring Connell, David McLaughlin (mandolin), Linda Lay (vocals), and Billy Lux (bass), focuses on gospel music.

=== Seneca Rocks! ===
2006, Connell formed the band Seneca Rocks! with Tom Adams, David McLaughlin, and Marshall Wilborn from the Johnson Mountain Boys along with Sally Love Connell, who previously sang in a duo with Connell and is his wife.

=== Audio Archival ===
From 1989 to 1998, Connell worked as manager of the Smithsonian Folkways office in Rockville, Maryland. He currently is an Audio Archivist for the National Council for the Traditional Arts, cataloging and digitizing their collection of recordings for the Library of Congress.

=== Awards ===
Connell won the 2000 International Bluegrass Music Awards (IBMA) award for Male Vocalist of the Year.

In Sept of 2020 Connell was inducted into the International Bluegrass Hall of Fame with the Johnson Mountain Boys.

== Discography ==
Besides his ensemble work, Connell has contributed his vocal and guitar support to recordings by numerous artists.

=== With The Johnson Mountain Boys ===
- 1981: The Johnson Mountain Boys (Rounder)
- 1982: Walls of Time (Rounder)
- 1983: Working Close (Rounder)
- 1984: Live at the Birchmere (Rounder)
- 1985: We'll Still Sing On (Rounder)
- 1987: Let the Whole World Talk (Rounder)
- 1988: Requests (Rounder)
- 1989: At the Old Schoolhouse (Rounder)
- 1993: Blue Diamond (Rounder)

=== With Longview ===
- 1997: Longview (Rounder)
- 1999: High Lonesome (Rounder)
- 2002: Lessons In Stone (Rebel)

=== With Don Rigsby ===
- 1999: Meet Me By the Moonlight (Sugar Hill)
- 2001: Another Saturday Night (Sugar Hill)

=== With The Seldom Scene ===
- 1996: Dream Scene (Sugar Hill)
- 2000: Scene It All (Sugar Hill)
- 2007: Scenechronized (Sugar Hill)
- 2014: Long Time... Seldom Scene (Smithsonian Folkways)
- 2019: Changes (Rounder)

=== With Stony Point ===
- 2003: Band of Angels (Cracker Barrel)

=== Also appears on ===
==== 1983–1989 ====
- 1983: Phyllis Boyens - I Really Care (Rounder)
- 1983: Hazel Dickens - By the Sweat of My Brow (Rounder)
- 1984: Delia Bell and Bill Grant - The Cheer Of The Home Fires (Rounder)
- 1985: Delia Bell and Bill Grant - A Few Dollars More (Rounder)
- 1985: Tony Trischka - Hill Country (Rounder)
- 1986: Gloria Belle - Love of the Mountains (Webco)
- 1988: Delia Bell and Bill Grant - Following a Feeling (Rounder)
- 1989: Chris Warner - Chris Warner & Friends (Webco)

==== 1990–1999 ====
- 1990: Jean Ritchie and Doc Watson - Jean Ritchie and Doc Watson at Folk City (Smithsonian Folkways)
- 1993: James King - These Old Pictures (Rounder)
- 1993: Larry Stephenson - Wash My Blues Away (Pinecastle)
- 1995: James King - Lonesome and Then Some (Rounder)
- 1995: Lynn Morris - Mama's Hand (Rounder)
- 1995: Butch Robins - Grounded Centered Focused (Hay Holler)
- 1995: Ralph Stanley and Joe Isaacs - A Gospel Gathering (Freeland)
- 1995: Tony Trischka - World Turning (Rounder)
- 1995: Tony Trischka - Glory Shone Around: A Christmas Collection (Rounder)
- 1996: Exit Thirteen - Wind on My Back (Freeland)
- 1997: Delia Bell - Dreaming (Rounder)
- 1997: Will Keys - Banjo Original (County)
- 1997: Stephen Wade - Dancing in the Parlor (County)
- 1998: Hazel Dickens - Heart of a Singer (Rounder)
- 1998: Mark Newton - Living a Dream (Rebel)
- 1998: Suzanne Thomas ll - Dear Friends & Gentle Hearts (Rounder)
- 1999: Tony Ellis - Sounds Like Bluegrass to Me (Copper Creek)Copper Creek)

==== 2000–present ====
- 2000: Bruce Molsky - Poor Man's Troubles (Rounder)
- 1998: Mark Newton - Follow Me Back to the Fold (Rebel)
- 2001: Bill Kirchen - Tied to the Wheel (HighTone)
- 2001: Carroll Best - Say Old Man, Can You Play the Banjo? (Copper Creek)
- 2001: Ron Stewart - Time Stands Still (Rounder)
- 2003: The Lynn Morris Band - Shape of a Tear (Rounder)
- 2004: Bruce Molsky - Contented Must Be (Rounder)
- 2005: Bill Kirchen - King of Dieselbilly (HighTone)
- 2006: Patrick McAvinue - Grave Run (Patuxent Music)
- 2007: Bill Emerson - Bill Emerson and the Sweet Dixie Band (Rebel)
- 2007: Curly Seckler - Bluegrass, Don't You Know (Copper Creek)
- 2007: Tony Trischka - Double Banjo Bluegrass Spectacular (Rounder)
- 2008: Margot Leverett - Second Avenue Square Dance (Traditional Crossroads)
- 2013: James King - Three Chords And The Truth (Rounder)
- 2013: Junior Sisk and Joe Mullins - Hall of Fame Bluegrass (Rebel)
