= Joe Mullins (musician) =

- Also known as: Joe Mullins
- Born: William Joseph Mullins; October 27, 1965 (age 60); Xenia, Ohio
- Genres: Bluegrass music
- Occupations: Musician, radio broadcaster
- Instruments: Banjo, vocals
- Years active: 1983–present
- Labels: Billy Blue Records, Rebel Records
- Website: radioramblers.com

Joe Mullins (born October 27, 1965) is an American banjo player, vocalist, band leader, and radio broadcaster. He plays bluegrass and gospel music.

== Biography ==
Joe Mullins was born and raised in southwestern Ohio. His father Paul "Moon" Mullins was a respected fiddler and broadcaster of a daytime bluegrass show on Classic Country Radio for more than four decades.

Mullins toured and recorded as a member of the Traditional Grass, the band he founded with his father, from 1983 until 1995. The band signed to Rebel Records and recorded four albums for the label between 1992 and 1995 following four previous independent projects on cassette.

In 1995, Mullins purchased WBZI Radio in Xenia, Ohio. He later purchased WKFI (Wilmington), WEDI (Eaton), FM 100.3 (Xenia / Dayton / Springfield), and FM 105.5 (Eaton / Dayton), of which he operates all as Real Roots Radio under Town and Country Broadcasting, Inc., having been renamed in March 2018 from My Classic Country.

In 1995, Mullins released Just A Five String & Fiddle, an album of duets with the late fiddler Gerald Evans, with whom he'd played in Traditional Grass.

In 1997, Mullins became a founding member of the band Longview, along with Dudley Connell, James King, Don Rigsby, Glen Duncan, and Marshall Wilborn. Longview earned the International Bluegrass Music Association (IBMA) Song of the Year and Recorded Event of the Year awards.

In 2006, Mullins formed his band The Radio Ramblers to promote his radio stations. Members included Adam McIntosh (guitar), Evan McGregor (fiddle), Mike Terry (mandolin), and Tim Kidd (bass). The band released their first CD in 2007 called Tuned In (independent MULLINS-3272-CD) followed by their first Rebel Records release Rambler’s Call album in 2010.

In 2011, Mullins released a gospel album Hymns from the Hills, with Larry Sparks, Doyle Lawson, and Rhonda Vincent guested. Playing My Song followed in 2012.

In 2013, Mullins and Junior Sisk released Hall of Fame Bluegrass, an album of duets to honor members of the Bluegrass Music Hall of Fame. Assisting were Jason Carter, Jesse Brock, Rob Ickes, Dudley Connell, and Marshall Wilborn.

On July 27, 2013, Joe Mullins and the Radio Ramblers made their Grand Ole Opry debut, and have continued to make regular appearances ever since.

Mullins released the album Another Day From Life in 2014.

In 2015, Mullins and the Radio Ramblers released the album Sacred Memories which featured contributions from Ricky Skaggs, Rhonda Vincent, and the Isaacs and won two IBMA awards for Gospel Recording of the Year in 2016 and 2017.

In 2015, Mullins began hosting a syndicated radio show called Front Porch Fellowship on Singing News Radio which is aired across much of the U.S. and Canada each week.

Mullins released the album The Story We Tell in 2017. The Radio Ramblers included Mullins (banjo), Mike Terry (mandolin), Jason Barie (fiddle), Duane Sparks (guitar), and Randy Barnes (bass).

Joe and the Radio Ramblers changed recording labels with a November 13, 2018 announcement and have released their debut album on Billy Blue Records on March 29, 2019 titled For the Record.

Joe is widely considered one of the world's most accomplished five-string banjo players in the traditional bluegrass style. Although primarily a Scruggs style player, his playing is also influenced by the work of J.D. Crowe, Sonny Osborne, and Don Reno. Vocal influences are apparent from the Osborne Brothers and Paul Williams.

=== Awards ===
Mullins has won the following International Bluegrass Music Association (IBMA) awards:

- 1998: Song of the Year "Lonesome Old Home", Longview (artists), Ed Hamilton (songwriter), Longview (project), Rounder Records
- 1998: Recorded Event of the Year, Longview, Longview, Rounder Records
- 2001: Instrumental Recording of the Year award (for his participation on the collaborative album Knee Deep In Bluegrass)
- 2006: Album of the Year (for his work on Celebration of Life for Skaggs Family Records)
- 2012: Emerging Artist of the Year - Joe Mullins and the Radio Ramblers
- 2013: Liner Notes, written by Fred Bartenstein, They're Playing My Song, Joe Mullins & The Radio Ramblers (artist), Rebel Records
- 2016: Broadcaster of the Year - Joe Mullins
- 2016: Liner Notes, written by Joe's son Daniel Mullins - The Blues Are Still The Blues, The Traditional Grass (artist), Rebel Records
- 2016: Gospel Recording of the Year (for the song "All Dressed Up” from his Sacred Memories album for Rebel Records)
- 2017: Gospel Recording of the Year (for the song "Sacred Memories" with Ricky Skaggs and Sharon White, from the Sacred Memories album for Rebel Records)
- 2018: Liner Notes, written by Craig Havighurst - The Story We Tell, Joe Mullins and the Radio Ramblers (Rebel Records)
- 2018: Song of the Year "If I'd Have Wrote That Song", Joe Mullins and the Radio Ramblers (artists), Larry Cordle, Larry Shell, & James Silvers (songwriters) from The Story We Tell album (Rebel Records)

Mullins has also been awarded by the Society for the Preservation of Bluegrass Music of America (SPBGMA)

- 2011: Broadcaster of the Year - Joe Mullins
- 2018: Bluegrass Gospel Group of the Year - Joe Mullins and the Radio Ramblers
- 2023: Banjo Player of the Year

=== Other projects ===
Mullins organizes the Southern Ohio Indoor Music Festival each March and November at the Roberts Centre in Wilmington, Ohio.

In 2014, Mullins was elected to the IBMA Board of Directors and in 2016, he was elected as Chairperson of the IBMA Board of Directors.

In September 2017, Mullins was re-elected as Chairperson of the IBMA Board of Directors.

=== Personal life ===
Mullins lives near Cedarville, Ohio with his wife Tammy, son Daniel, and daughter Sarah. He is the son of the late Paul and Prudence Mullins, and older brother to Christy Mullins Jones.

== Discography ==
=== The Traditional Grass ===
- 1985: Paul Mullins and the Traditional Grass (independent)
- 1987: A Touch of the Fifties (independent)
- 1989: Traditional Favorites (independent)
- 1990: A Lonesome Road to Travel (independent)
- 1992: Howdy Neighbor Howdy (Rebel)
- 1993: 10th Anniversary Collection (Rebel)
- 1993: I Believe in the Old Time Way (Rebel)
- 1995: Songs of Love and Life (Rebel)
- 2015: The Blues Are Still the Blues (Rebel)

=== Joe Mullins and the Radio Ramblers ===
- 2007: Tuned In (independent MULLINS-3272-CD)
- 2010: Rambler's Call (Rebel)
- 2011: Hymns From the Hills (Rebel)
- 2012: They're Playing My Song (Rebel)
- 2014: Another Day from Life (Rebel)
- 2016: Sacred Memories (Rebel)
- 2017: The Story We Tell (Rebel)
- 2019: For the Record (Billy Blue Records)
- 2021: Somewhere Beyond The Blue

=== Gerald Evans and Joe Mullins ===
- 1995: Just a Five-String and a Fiddle (Rebel)

=== With Longview ===
- 1997: Longview (Rounder)
- 1999: High Lonesome (Rounder)
- 2002: Lessons in Stone (Rebel)

=== Junior Sisk and Joe Mullins ===
- 2013: Hall of Fame Bluegrass (Rebel)

=== Joe Mullins also appears on these recordings ===
- 2000: Knee Deep in Bluegrass - The AcuTab Sessions CD - COMPILATION (Reissued 2005: Rebel)
- 2001: Travelin' Preacher Man - Lawrence Bishop (Jordan Records JRD501085)
- 2006: Celebration of Life - Musicians Against Childhood Cancer - COMPILATION (Skaggs Family Records)
- 2008: Gardens in the Sky: The Bluegrass Gospel of James King (Rounder) with Longview
- 2012: Musicians Against Childhood Cancer (The MACC) - Life Goes On - COMPILATION (Rural Rhythm RUR1094) with Aubrey Haynie
- 2012: Foggy Mountain Special - A Bluegrass Tribute to Earl Scruggs - COMPILATION (Rounder 11661-0638-2)
- 2013: The Story of the Day That I Died - Junior Sisk and Ramblers Choice (Rebel)
- 2014: Family, Friends & Fellowship - Steve Gulley (Rural Rhythm)
- 2017: Front Porch Fellowship - Joe Mullins Presents 20 Bluegrass Gospel Classics - COMPILATION (Rebel)
- 2017: Chapter 3 - Lawson & Williams - featuring Doyle Lawson & Paul Williams (Mountain Home)

== DVD Projects ==
- 2014: Joe Mullins & the Radio Ramblers with Special Guests the Centerville Alternative Strings (recorded March 9, 2013 at Centerville (Ohio) High School)

== Music Instruction ==
- 1996: Joe Mullins AcuTab Transcription Vol 1 (AcuTab)
- 2001: Knee Deep in Banjo - Banjo tabs from Knee Deep in Bluegrass AcuTab CD featuring the banjo playing of Terry Baucom, Joe Mullins, Alan Munde, Sammy Shelor, Tony Trischka, Scott Vestal and Pete Wernick.
