= James King (bluegrass singer) =

American bluegrass singer (1958–2016)

- Born: James Elroy King; September 9, 1958; Martinsville, Virginia
- Died: May 19, 2016 (aged 57) Salem, Virginia
- Genres: Bluegrass music
- Occupations: Singer, musician
- Instruments: Vocals, guitar
- Years active: 1985–2016
- Label: Rounder
- Formerly of: Ralph Stanley, Longview, The James King Band

James Elroy King (September 9, 1958 – May 19, 2016) was an American bluegrass music singer, and musician. Tom T. Hall dubbed King the "Bluegrass Storyteller", for his ability to infuse his story songs with emotion and authenticity.

== Early life ==
King was raised in Cana, Virginia, in Carroll County. His father Jim King had appeared on Roanoke television with Don Reno and Red Smiley as tenor vocalist and guitarist for the Country Cousins. His father and his uncle Joe Edd King had played with Ted Lundy of the Southern Mountain Boys.

In 1974, King heard the Stanley Brothers and fell in love with their bluegrass music. King began his career at age 16 playing gospel music at his Pentecostal Holiness church. He left Cana at age 19.

== Ralph Stanley ==
After a stint in the United States Marine Corps, King relocated to Wilmington, Delaware where he started a band with Lundy's sons T.J. and Bobby. In 1986, bluegrass deejay Ray Davis introduced King to Ralph Stanley, with whom he recorded two albums: Stanley Brothers Classics and Reunion with George Shuffler on Davis's Wango label. Stanley named King an honorary member of his Clinch Mountain Boys.

== Solo recordings ==
In July 1988, King recorded his first album under his own name on the Webco label: It's a Cold, Cold World (reissued in 1996 as Webco Classics, Volume Two.

For a brief period in the early 1990s, King was a member of Big Country Bluegrass. Dudley Connell of the Johnson Mountain Boys brought King to the attention of Ken Irwin at Rounder Records. King signed to Rounder Records in 1992 and released his album These Old Pictures in 1993.

On Lonesome and Then Some in 1995, King was backed by Connell (guitar, vocals), Tom Adams (banjo), David McLaughlin (guitar, vocals), and Marshall Wilborn (bass).

King formed the James King Band, which was named Emerging Artist of the Year by the International Bluegrass Music Association (IBMA) in 1997. In 1998 Bed by the Window was the recording debut of the James King Band, and its title track was nominated for IBMA's Song of the Year in 1999.

In 2002, 30 Years of Farming featured the James King Band as supporting instrumentalists.

King released The Bluegrass Storyteller in 2005 with Kevin Prater (mandolin), Bernie Green (banjo), Jerry McNeely (bass), and Adam Haynes (fiddle).

In 2013, King released what would be his final album, the Grammy-nominated Three Chords and the Truth, recorded over a five-year period. King selected country music songs and arranged them for bluegrass. He was assisted by Connell, Don Rigsby, Jimmy Mattingly (fiddle), Ronnie Stewart (banjo), Jesse Brock (mandolin), Jason Moore (bass), and Josh Williams (guitar).

== Longview ==
Formed in 1997, Longview brought together King, Connell, Rigsby, Willborn, Glen Duncan, and Joe Mullins. For later recordings, Connell, Mullins, and Duncan were replaced by J. D. Crowe, Ron Stewart, and Lou Reid. Longview recorded four albums. Their self-titled 1997 debut was named Recorded Event of the Year by the IBMA. This was followed by High Lonesome in 1999, Lessons in Stone in 2002, and Deep in the Mountains in 2008.

== Later life and death ==
King was a recovering alcoholic, and in recent years had struggled with liver issues. He died on May 19, 2016, surrounded by family and friends.

== Honors, awards, and distinctions ==
King won 12 Bluegrass Music awards, a Grammy Award nomination for Three Chords & the Truth, and was inducted into the Virginia Music Hall of Fame in 2014. In 2015, King received the SPBGMA Masters Gold Award for Traditional Male Vocalist of the Year for winning Male Vocalist of the Year 10 times in a row.

== Discography ==
=== Solo albums ===
- It's A Cold Cold World (1989)
- These Old Pictures (1993)
- Lonesome and Then Some (1995)
- Bed by the Window (1998)
- Thirty Years of Farming (2002)
- The Bluegrass Storyteller (2005)
- Three Chords and the Truth (2013)

=== Compilations ===
- Webco Classics Vol. 2 (1995)
- Gardens in the Sky: The Bluegrass Gospel of James King (2008)

=== With Ralph Stanley ===
- Introducing James King, with the Clinch Mountain Boys (1986)
- Reunion, with George Shuffler and James King (1997)

=== With Longview ===
- Longview (1997)
- High Lonesome (1999)
- Lessons in Stone (2002)
- Deep in the Mountains (2008)

=== Also appears on ===
- Paul Williams - Ain't God Good (1997)
