= Gary Brewer =

American singer-songwriter

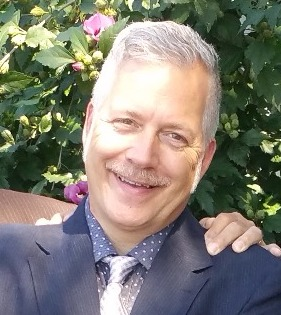
- Brewer in 2017

Background information
- Born: April 19, 1965 (age 61); Louisville, Kentucky
- Genre: Bluegrass music
- Occupation: Musician
- Instruments: Guitar, banjo
- Years active: 1979–present
- Labels: louisvillemusic.com Records, Stretch Grass Music
- Website: brewgrass.com

Gary Brewer is an American guitarist and banjoist in the bluegrass tradition. He is best known for leading the Kentucky Ramblers, and for staging the annual Strictly Bluegrass festival.

== Biography ==
Brewer was raised in Louisville, Kentucky. His grandfather Finley J. Brewer Sr. performed with the Carter Family, and his father Finley J. Brewer Jr. (aka Jim Brewer) has played since 1950. Sometimes Jim has performed with his son Gary and Gary's sons Wayne and Mason.

Brewer played rock music until he began playing acoustic guitar while recuperating from an auto accident. That was when he and two friends formed the bluegrass group Kentucky Ramblers in 1979.

In 1994, Brewer was invited to participate in Bill and James Monroe's "Father and Son" Winter Tour.

Released in 1995, Brewer's album Guitar also features Bill Monroe, Ron Stewart, Larry Sparks, and Josh Graves on a set of instrumentals.

Brewer released Jimmy Martin Songs For Dinner in 1999, with assistance from J. D. Crowe, Larry Stephenson, Doyle Lawson, Bobby Hicks, Terry Eldredge, Terry Smith, and Art Stamper. The title song on this tribute to Jimmy Martin was written by Tom T. Hall specifically for this album.

=== Strictly Bluegrass Festival ===
In 1989, Brewer worked with the Louisville mayor's office to launch the Strictly Bluegrass bluegrass festival held at the Iroquois Amphitheater and later moved to New Albany, Indiana.

=== Awards and recognition ===
In 2000, Brewer was nominated as a finalist twice by the International Bluegrass Music Association: for Guitar Player of the Year, and his song Jimmy Martin Songs for Dinner for Song of the Year.

=== Personal life ===
Brewer's nickname is "Stretch", and his record label is Stretchgrass Productions.

== Discography ==
=== Solo recordings ===
- 1995: Guitar (Copper Creek)

=== Gary Brewer and the Kentucky Ramblers ===
- 1986: Thinking of Home (Turquoise) as The Kentucky Ramblers
- 1990: Down Home Memories (Copper Creek)
- 1992: Goin' Back to Kentucky (Copper Creek)
- 1993: Nearing Jordan's Crossing (Copper Creek)
- 1994: Money to Ride the Train (Copper Creek)
- 1996: Live in Europe (Copper Creek)
- 1997: Memories of Home (Cowan Creek)
- 1998: Kentucky Headlines and Heartbreak EP (self-released)
- 1998: Heaven's Jubilee (Cowan Creek)
- 1999: Jimmy Martin Songs For Dinner (louisvillemusic.com)
- 2001: Home Brew (Copper Creek)
- 2014: Homestretch (Stretch Grass)

=== Gary and Jim Brewer ===
- 1991: Two Of A Kind (Copper Creek)

=== Pap Brewer with Gary Brewer and the Kentucky Ramblers ===
- 1994: Finley J. Brewer, Sr. from Roan Mountain, TN (June Appal Recordings)

=== Gary Brewer and Phil Sexton ===
- 1999: The 5th Generation (June Appal)

=== Music instruction ===
- 1998: Gary Brewer, Guitar: Bluegrass Guitar at Its Best (Mel Bay) ISBN 978-0786644506
