= Rivers and Roads =

Rivers and Roads may refer to:

- "Rivers and Roads", a song by the American folk band The Head and the Heart
- Rivers and Roads (2018), an album by the acoustic bluegrass group The Special Consensus
