= Bill Vernon =

American radio DJ

Bill Vernon (July 4, 1937 – November 20, 1996) was an American radio DJ

He was born in Brooklyn, New York City. In his early teens he became enamoured with Bluegrass music and publicized and promoted that genre in many ways. He was a DJ in New York, New Jersey, and Virginia; he wrote liner notes for around a hundred recordings. In 1973 he moved to Rocky Mount, Virginia. In 1994 and in 1998 he received the International Bluegrass Music Association's award for best liner notes, and that organization's certificate of merit in 1988. He compiled the country music chart for Billboard magazine. He MC'd at many a bluegrass performance or festival, including Bill Monroe's Bean Blossom Festival in Indiana, and festivals of Ralph Stanley and Carlton Haney. He served as editor for Muleskinner News and wrote many articles on early bluegrass performers for that and other publications, including Bluegrass Unlimited.

In 2004, he was honored by being inducted into the International Bluegrass Music Museum's Hall of Fame. He died on November 20, 1996, in Rocky Mount.

== Quotes ==
- “When I feel the best, I want to hear bluegrass, and when I feel the worst, I have to hear bluegrass."
