= Longview (American band) =

American bluegrass supergroup

Longview is an American bluegrass supergroup that was formed in 1995. The group's name is derived from the Long View Recording Studio complex in North Brookfield, Massachusetts, where they recorded their first album.

== Band members ==
- James King - guitar, vocals
- Lou Reid - guitar, vocals
- Don Rigsby - mandolin
- Ron Stewart - fiddle
- J. D. Crowe - banjo
- Marshall Wilborn - bass

Original

- Dudley Connell
- Glen Duncan
- James King
- Joe Mullins
- Don Rigsby
- Marshall Wilborn

== Discography ==
=== Albums ===
- 1997: Longview (Rounder)
- 1999: High Lonesome (Rounder)
- 2002: Lessons in Stone (Rebel)
- 2008: Deep in the Mountains (Rounder)
