= Authentic Unlimited =

American bluegrass band

- Origin: United States
- Genre: Bluegrass
- Years active: 2022–present
- Label: Billy Blue Records
- Members: Jerry Cole; Eli Johnston; Stephen Burwell; Jesse Brock; Colton Baker
- Website: authenticunlimitedband.com

Authentic Unlimited is an American bluegrass band.

== History ==
When veteran bluegrass band leader Doyle Lawson retired in 2021, three members of his Quicksilver band, Eli Johnston, Stephen Burwell and Jerry Cole, got together with Jesse Brock and John Meador to debut the new band Authentic Unlimited the following year.

In 2023, Authentic Unlimited released two albums and performed at the Grand Ole Opry. That year, they were named Vocal Group of the year by the International Bluegrass Music Association.

In 2024, Authentic Unlimited received three awards at the International Bluegrass Music Awards.

Colton Baker replaced John Meador in March of 2025.

== Albums ==
- Authentic Unlimited
- Gospel Sessions, Vol. 1
- Gospel Sessions, Vol. 2
- So Much For Forever
