= Johnson Mountain Boys =

American bluegrass band

- Origin: Gaithersburg Maryland and Washington, D.C., U.S.A.
- Genres: bluegrass
- Years active: 1978–1988, with some "reunion" shows from 1989 to 1996.
- Label: Rounder
- Past members: Initial line-up: Dudley Connell - lead vocals, banjo, guitar Richard Underwood - vocals, banjo Eddie D'Zmura (musician/vocalist/mandolin/composer who recorded on the first three discs including Rounder 0135 Self Titled The Johnson Mountain Boys; David McLaughlin - vocals, mandolin, fiddle, lead guitar Eddie Stubbs - vocals, fiddle Larry Robbins - bass Other Members: Tom Adams - vocals, banjo, mandolin (joined 1986); Marshall Wilborn - vocals, bass (joined 1986); Earl Yager - bass Warren Blair - not a band member but played fiddle on the album Blue Diamond.

The Johnson Mountain Boys were a popular bluegrass band throughout the 1980s from the Washington, D.C. area. Their style favored a more traditional approach to bluegrass than some of their contemporaries. They released two 45 RPM single records, one EP record, ten albums and toured widely, playing venues such as Madison Square Garden, The White House, the Lincoln Center, Carnegie Hall, and the Grand Ole Opry in the United States. Other tours took them around the world to Canada, England, Japan, China, Southeast Asia, India, and Africa. The group was frequently recognized with nominations for Grammy Awards, International Bluegrass Music Awards, and awards from the Society for the Preservation of Bluegrass Music in America. Many of the band's members are still active in other musical groups and settings.

In 2020, the band was inducted into the Bluegrass Music Hall of Fame.

== History ==
=== Early years ===
The first grouping initially known as "The Johnson Boys", formed in 1975 as a duo featuring Dudley Connell on banjo and Ron Welch on guitar. Eddie D'Zmura, a high school friend of Dudley Connell's, joined soon thereafter on mandolin. The band was renamed, "The Johnson Mountain Boys" after learning of another folk band already using the "Johnson Boys" name. The name The Johnson Mountain Boys was suggested by George Connell, Dudley's father. The "Johnson Mountain" referred to in the name of the band is a fictitious name (i.e. there is no Johnson Mountain in any of the areas from which any of the band members came). The group became a full five-piece band in January 1978 featuring Connell on guitar, Franny Davidson on banjo—replaced by Richard Underwood after the band's first recording session—Eddie D'Zmura on mandolin, David McLaughlin on fiddle, and Gary Reid on bass. Gary Reid left the group in late 1978 and started the Copper Creek record company. He was replaced by Mark Prindle on the bass. The Johnson Mountain Boys first commercial record release was Copper Creek Records number 0001 featuring original instrumental composition "Johnson Mountain Hoedown" written by Dudley Connell and Ed D'Zmura. The B side was "When I Can Forget" a song written by Dudley Connell. The personnel on the record was Dudley Connell on guitar and vocals, David McLaughlin on fiddle and vocals, Ed D'Zmura on mandolin, Franny Davidson on banjo, and Mark Prindle on bass. After the release of the first Copper Creek single, David McLaughlin went off to college and continued to play fiddle part-time with the band. After David McLaughlin left for college, Eddie Stubbs performed his first show on fiddle with the Johnson Mountain Boys in November 1978 when he was just 16 years old, just a week before his 17th birthday. From that point, he was considered the main fiddle player for the group, but played only once per week with the group since he was still in high school (senior year). Since Eddie was not able to perform every show because of school, the fiddle duties were covered by David McLaughlin, Bill Belford, and Carl Nelson when Eddie was not able to appear. In May 1979, Eddie became the full-time fiddle player for the group at age 17. He graduated from Gaithersburg High School that June. In 1979, before the recording of their second Copper Creek record, Mark Prindle was replaced by Larry Robbins on bass. The group's second record was Copper Creek Records number 0101, an EP featuring "Sitting Alone in the Moonlight," "Eddie's Hoedown," "Where We'll Never Die," and "No Depression in Heaven." In 1980, the band was picked up by Rounder Records. The group's self-titled first album won considerable acclaim. After the release of their first Rounder album, David McLaughlin left college in early 1981 to rejoin the group full-time, replacing Ed D'Zmura on mandolin. Subsequent albums made the group young standard bearers of traditional bluegrass in the 1980s. In 1986, there were two personnel changes. Marshall Wilborn replaced Larry Robbins on bass in June and Tom Adams replaced Richard Underwood on banjo in September.

=== Initial break-up and regrouping (1988–1996) ===
In 1987, the Johnson Mountain Boys announced their plans to disband after a farewell concert at the Old Schoolhouse in Lucketts, Virginia. The February 20, 1988 concert was recorded and released the following year as a double live album, At the Old Schoolhouse. Critics hailed the release as one of the group's finest moments and it was ultimately nominated for a Grammy. After this concert, the group toured Southeast Asia without David McLaughlin and Eddie Stubbs in 1988. Upon the return from Southeast Asia, Dudley Connell, Richard Underwood, David McLaughlin, and Eddie Stubbs, decided to return to the stage on a part-time basis in 1989, performing 25 to 50 concerts per year instead of the 200 to 250 concerts per year they had been performing until their final Lucketts concert in 1988. The only member who could not rejoin was Marshall Wilborn, who moved on to help found the Lynn Morris Band at that time. The band and the promotion of these concerts did not refer to them as reunion concerts. It was actually written in all contracts that these concerts were not to be referred to as reunions. The longest-running lineup of this version of the band consisted of Connell, Stubbs, McLaughlin, Adams and the group's newest member, Earl Yager on bass. This regrouping of the Johnson Mountain Boys started performing in 1989. They recorded another album, Blue Diamond, in 1993 (nominated for a Grammy). The group performed their last concert at the bluegrass festival in Myrtle Beach, SC in November 1996.

=== Since the final break-up (Since November 1996) ===
The band's various members independently continued to pursue active careers. Dudley Connell became the guitarist and lead singer of the Seldom Scene and became the head of the mail-order division of the Folkways Record Collection at the Smithsonian Institution and later an archivist for the National Council for the Traditional Arts. Eddie Stubbs relocated to Nashville where he continued to play fiddle for acts such as Johnnie Wright, Kitty Wells, and Bill Anderson. Stubbs also became a DJ on WSM-AM and announcer for the Grand Ole Opry. He has won Broadcast Personality of the Year awards from the Country Music Association (2002) and from the International Bluegrass Music Association (1996, 2002). David McLaughlin formed a duo with Josh Crowe, has worked with several other bands, including the Lynn Morris Band and Springfield Exit. He operated a recording studio from 1994 until 2009 in Winchester, VA. Tom Adams has worked as a banjo player in the Lynn Morris Band, Blue Highway, and in bands headed by Rhonda Vincent and Dale Ann Bradley. Adams was awarded Banjo Player of the Year three times (1992, 1993, 2002) by the International Bluegrass Music Association. He was most recently (July 6, 2009 - May 9, 2011) the guitarist and lead singer for Michael Cleveland & Flamekeeper. Marshall Wilborn, bassist, singer and songwriter, was most recently (Fall, 2007 - May 9, 2011) a member of Michael Cleveland and Flamekeeper.

== Discography ==
- The Johnson Mountain Boys (1978; 1981, Rounder)
- Walls of Time (1982 Rounder)
- Working Close (1983 Rounder)
- Live at the Birchmere (1984 Rounder)
- The Johnson Mountain Boys (1984, Copper Creek)
- We'll Still Sing On (1985, Rounder)
- Let the Whole World Talk (1987, Rounder)
- Requests (1988, Rounder)
- At the Old Schoolhouse (1989, Rounder)
- Blue Diamond (1993, Rounder)

=== Compilations ===
- Favorites (1987, Rounder)
