= Chris Jones (bluegrass musician) =

American bluegrass musician

- Born: Brooklyn, New York, U.S.
- Genres: Bluegrass music
- Occupation: Musician
- Instrument(s): Vocals, guitar
- Labels: Mountain Home, Rebel
- Website: chrisjonesgrass.com

Chris Jones is an American bluegrass singer, guitarist, songwriter, and broadcaster, singing in a baritone voice. He fronts the Night Drivers.

== Biography ==
Jones started out in Brooklyn, New York, where his mother was a singer and actress. His uncle played Scruggs-style and clawhammer banjo. But Jones's interest in bluegrass was sparked when he lived in Albuquerque with his father and stepmother, who listened to country and bluegrass. Jones took up guitar at age 12 or 13.

When Jones was age 18 and back in New York, he joined Horse Country as lead singer and guitarist, led by banjoist Bob Mavian. After four years with Chicago's the Special Consensus, Jones played with Whetstone Run, the Lynn Morris Band, the McCarters, and Dave Evans.

Jones moved to Nashville in 1989 as a member of the band Weary Hearts, which included Ron Block, Mike Bub, and the late Butch Baldassari. He formed Chris Jones & The Night Drivers in 1995, and they've been recording and touring ever since. Current members are Jones, Marshall Wilborn (bass), Mark Stoffel (mandolin), and Grace Van't Hof (banjo).

Jones has performed with the Chieftains, Vassar Clements, Tom T. Hall, and Earl Scruggs.

=== Writing and broadcasting ===
Jones writes a weekly column for the website Bluegrass Today.

Jones has been a broadcaster for SiriusXM's Bluegrass Junction for more than 15 years. He also hosts the classic bluegrass show "Truegrass." Ned Luberecki and Jon Weisberger are also broadcasters.

He has also appeared in the PBS series "The Appalachians" as a both a performer and commentator.

=== Songwriting ===
Jones's compositions have been recorded by the Gibson Brothers, the Infamous Stringdusters, the Chapmans, and Lou Reid.

=== Awards ===
International Bluegrass Music Association (IBMA) awards received:

- 2005: Album Of The Year (for his role in the Larry Sparks album 40)
- 2007: Song Of The Year (co-writer of "Fork In The Road" by the Infamous Stringdusters)
- 2007: Broadcaster Of The Year
- 2014 Print Media Person Of The Year for his writing at Bluegrass Today
- 2014: Best Graphic Design for Lonely Comes Easy (with designer Lou Everhart and Rebel Records)
- 2014: Broadcaster Of The Year

=== Personal life ===
Jones and his wife Sally Jones live in Alberta.

== Discography ==
=== Solo albums ===
- 1995: Blinded by the Rose (Strictly Country)
- 1998: Follow Your Heart (Rebel)
- 2000: Just A Drifter (Rebel)
- 2006: Too Far Down the Road (Little Dog)

=== Compilations ===
- 2002: A Few Words: The Best Of The Originals (Rebel)

=== Chris Jones & The Night Drivers ===
- 1997: No One But You (Rebel)
- 2009: Cloud of Dust (GSM)
- 2013: Lonely Comes Easy (Rebel)
- 2014: Live At The Old Feed Store (GSM)
- 2015: Run Away Tonight (Mountain Home)
- 2017: Made To Move (Mountain Home)

=== As a member of The Special Consensus ===
- 1983: Blue Northerns (Acoustic Revival)

=== As a member of Weary Hearts ===
- 1989: By Heart (Flying Fish)

=== Also appears on ===
- 1980: Tom MacKenzie – Finally Tuned (Rooster)
- 1995: Cornerstone – Lonesome Town (Folk Era) – vocals
- 1995: Lynn Morris – Mama's Hand (Rounder) – guitar
- 2005: Larry Sparks – 40 (Rebel) – vocals on track 14, "It's Too Late To Walk The Floor"
- 2008: Sierra Hull – Secrets (Rounder) – vocals on track 11, "Absence Makes The Heart Grow Fonder"
- 2010: Special Consensus – 35 (Compass)
- 2012: Special Consensus – Scratch Gravel Road (Compass)
- 2016: Kristin Scott Benson – Stringworks (Mountain Home) – vocals

=== Music instruction ===
- 1993: The Traditional Bluegrass Songbook book, CD (Musicians Workshop) ISBN 978-1584961246
- 1999: The Bluegrass Wordbook with Chris Jones book, CD (Musicians Workshop) ISBN 978-1584960874
- 2002: The Art of Bluegrass Rhythm Guitar with Chris Jones DVD (Musicians Workshop)
- 2003: Learn the Art of Bluegrass Guitar streaming video (Musicians Workshop)
- 2004: Bluegrass Guitar Solos with Chris Jones DVD (Musicians Workshop)
