= The Special Consensus =

American acoustic bluegrass band

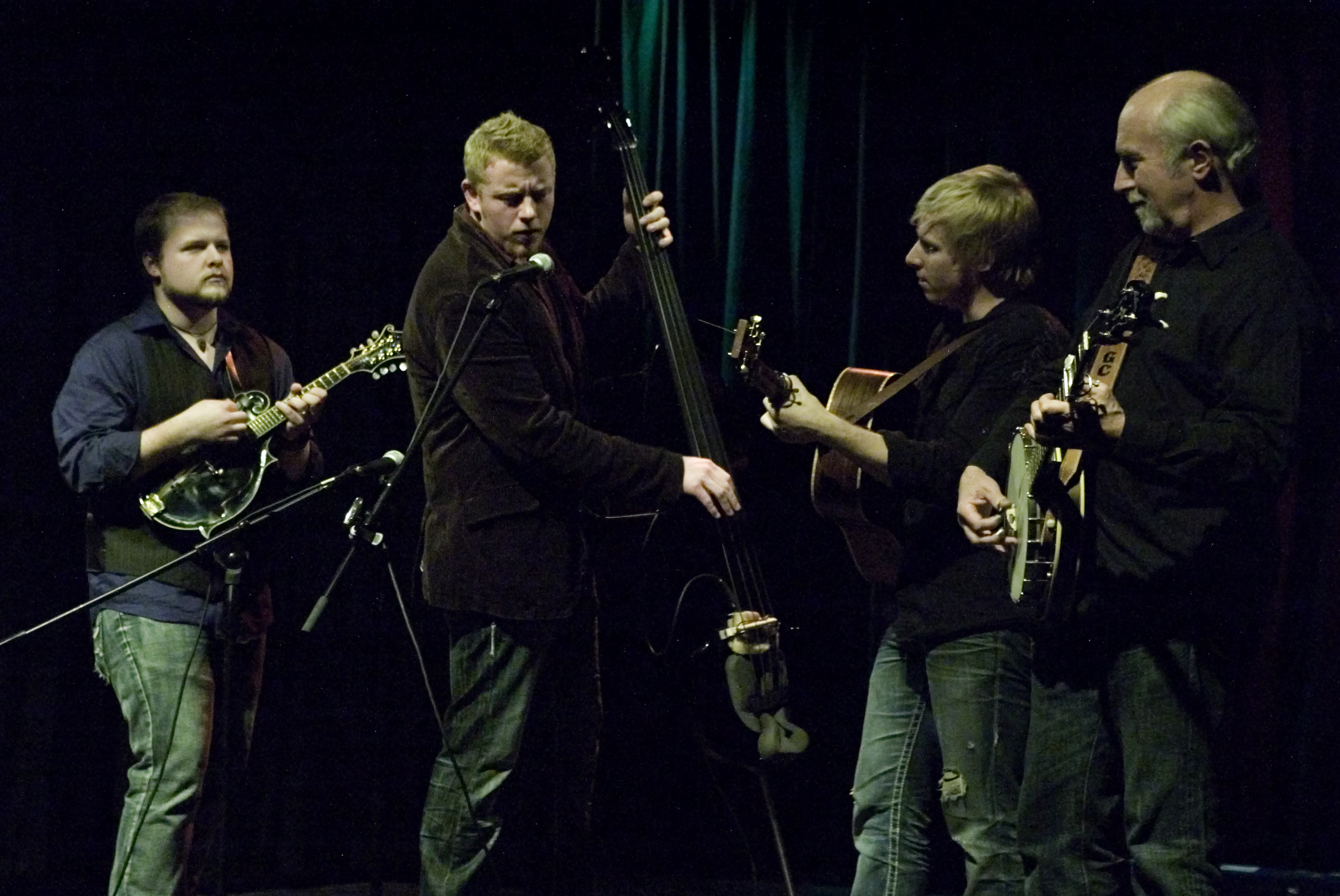
- The Special Consensus in 2011

Background information
- Origin: Chicago, Illinois
- Genre: Bluegrass music
- Years active: 1975—present
- Labels: Compass Records, Pinecastle Records, ShyTown Records, Turqouise Records, Acoustic Revival Records, Tin Ear Records
- Members: Greg Cahill (banjo); Brian McCarty (mandolin); Nico Humby (upright bass); Greg Blake (guitar)
- Past members: (see Past Members section below)
- Website: Official website

The Special Consensus is an acoustic bluegrass group led by banjoist Greg Cahill.

== Biography ==
=== History ===
In 1973, graduate student Cahill jammed with other bluegrass musicians at the University of Chicago Folk Festival. They began playing house parties, but in 1975 Cahill and bassist Marc Edelstein decided to pursue a music career for a few years as Special Consensus. The initial line-up included Cahill, Edelstein, Jeremy Raven (mandolin), Jim Iberg (guitar), and Jim Hale (fiddle).

The band name was inspired by a series of books written by Carlos Castenada about rituals of the Yaqui Indians. Special Consensus was a state where spiritual and physical good things physically came together. Plus, a band is a consensus of musicians providing performance and inspiration.

As of 2021, the Special Consensus membership has included 18 guitarists, 12 bass players, 18 mandolin players, and two fiddlers. Bandleader Greg Cahill has been the one consistent member through the band's history.

=== Touring ===
Special Consensus tours frequently across the U.S. Every other year, the band has also toured Ireland and the United Kingdom, through at least 2017.

=== Bluegrass In Schools ===
In 1984, The Special Consensus initiated the Traditional American Music (TAM) Program, in which they introduce students and teachers to bluegrass in schools across the country. Cahill estimates TAM has reached approximately one million children.

Special Consensus has also been involved with IBMA's Bluegrass In The Schools (BGIS) program. Cahill has been chairman of the BGIS Committee. He and his wife Jackie wrote a BGIS Implementation manual. In addition, Special Consensus provided the instrumentation for a Discover Bluegrass DVD.

=== Awards ===
The group is a two-time Grammy nominee for "Best Bluegrass Album of the Year" for the 2012 album Scratch Gravel Road, and the 2018 album Rivers and Roads.

Special Consensus has won a number of International Bluegrass Music Association (IBMA) awards through the years.

Instrumental Recorded Performance of the Year

- 2014: "Thank God I'm A Country Boy"
- 2016: "Fireball"
- 2018: Squirrel Hunters

Collaborative Recording of the Year (formerly Recorded Event of the Year)

- 2014: "Wild Montana Skies"
- 2023: "Alberta Bound"

Album of the Year

- 2018: Rivers & Roads

Song of the Year

- 2020: "Chicago Barn Dance"

Music Video of the Year

- 2024: "Alberta Bound"

The individual members of Special Consensus have received IBMA awards during their tenure in the band.

=== Reunion concerts ===
Every five years, current and past members of the Special Consensus gather for and perform in an anniversary concert, often at Old Town School of Folk Music in Chicago.

=== Past members ===
1975–1976	1976–1977	1977–1979
Greg Cahill – banjo; Marc Edelstein – vocals, bass; Jeremy Raven – mandolin; Jim Iberg – vocals, guitar; Jim Hale – fiddle	Greg Cahill – banjo; Marc Edelstein – vocals, bass; Wally Vispoel – mandolin; Ed Walsh – vocals, guitar	Greg Cahill – banjo; Marc Edelstein – vocals, bass; Mark Weiss – mandolin; Ed Walsh – guitar
1979–1981	1981–1982	1982–1984
Greg Cahill – banjo; Marc Edelstein – vocals, bass; Mark Weiss – mandolin; Mitch Corbin – vocals, guitar	Greg Cahill – banjo; Marc Edelstein – vocals, bass; Mark Weiss – mandolin; Chris Jones - vocals, guitar	Greg Cahill – banjo; John Rice – vocals, bass; Paul Kramer – vocals, mandolin; Chris Jones - vocals, guitar
1984	1984–1985	1985
Greg Cahill – banjo; Jerry Eliason – vocals, bass; Howie Tarnower - vocals, mandolin; Chris Jones – vocals, guitar	Greg Cahill – banjo; Jerry Eliason – vocals, bass; Tim Wilson – vocals, mandolin; Chris Jones – vocals, guitar	Greg Cahill – banjo; Jerry Eliason – bass; Tim Wilson – mandolin; Tim Gleason - vocals, guitar
1985–1988	1988	1988–1989
Greg Cahill – banjo; Scott Salak – bass; Tim Wilson – mandolin; Dennis White - vocals, guitar	Greg Cahill – banjo; Scott Salak – vocals, bass; Tim Wilson – vocals, mandolin; Bob Lucas – vocals, guitar	Greg Cahill – banjo; Scott Salak – vocals, bass; Tim Wilson – vocals, mandolin; Robbie Fulks - vocals, guitar
1989–1990	1990–1991	1992–1993
Greg Cahill – banjo; Dallas Wayne - vocals, bass; Tim Wilson – vocals, mandolin; Robbie Fulks - vocals, guitar	Greg Cahill – banjo; Dennis Wayne – vocals, bass; Don Stiernberg - vocals, mandolin; Marty Marrone – vocals, guitar; Al Murphy – fiddle	Greg Cahill – banjo; Darren Wilcox - bass, vocals; Drew Carson – mandolin; Marty Marrone - vocals, guitar
1993–1994	1994–1995	1995
Greg Cahill – banjo; Darren Wilcox - vocals, bass; Keith Baumann – mandolin; Marty Marrone - vocals, guitar	Greg Cahill – banjo; Darren Wilcox - vocals, bass; Drew Carson – mandolin; Marty Marrone - vocals, guitar	Greg Cahill – banjo; Darren Wilcox – vocals, bass; John Wheat - mandolin; Marty Marrone – vocals, guitar
1995–1996	1996–1997	1997
Greg Cahill – banjo; Darren Wilcox - bass, vocals; Colby Maddox – vocals, mandolin; Marty Marrone - vocals, guitar	Greg Cahill – banjo; Diana Phillips - vocals, bass; Colby Maddox – vocals, mandolin; Bobby Burns - vocals, guitar	Greg Cahill – banjo; Diana Phillips - vocals, bass; Colby Maddox – vocals, mandolin; Clem O'Brien - vocals, guitar
1997–1999	1999–2001	2001–2004
Greg Cahill – banjo; Andrea Roberts – vocals, bass; Colby Maddox - vocals, mandolin; Chris Walz – vocals, guitar	Greg Cahill – banjo; Tim Dishman - vocals, bass; Josh Williams – vocals, mandolin; Chris Walz - vocals, guitar	Greg Cahill – banjo; Tim Dishman - vocals, bass; Josh Williams – vocals, mandolin; Jamie Clifton - vocals, guitar
2004–2006	2006–2007	2007–2009
Greg Cahill – banjo; Tres Nugent - vocals, bass; Ron Spears – vocals, mandolin; Justin Carbone - vocals, guitar	Greg Cahill – banjo; David Thomas – vocals, bass; Ron Spears - vocals, mandolin; Justin Carbone – vocals, guitar	Greg Cahill – banjo; David Thomas - vocals, bass; Ashby Frank – vocals, mandolin; Justin Carbone - vocals, guitar
2009–2011	2011–2013	2013–2014
Greg Cahill – banjo; David Thomas - vocals, bass; Rick Faris – vocals, mandolin; Ryan Roberts - vocals, guitar	Greg Cahill – banjo; David Thomas - vocals, bass; Rick Faris – vocals, mandolin; Dustin Benson - vocals, guitar	Greg Cahill – banjo; Dan Eubanks – vocals, bass; Rick Faris - vocals, mandolin; Dustin Benson – vocals, guitar
2014–2015	2015–2019	2019–2021
Greg Cahill – banjo; Dan Eubanks - vocals, bass; Rick Faris – vocals, mandolin; Dustin Benson - vocals, guitar	Greg Cahill – banjo; Dan Eubanks - vocals, bass; Nick Dumas – vocals, mandolin; Rick Faris – vocals, guitar	Greg Cahill – banjo; Dan Eubanks - vocals, bass; Nate Burie – vocals, mandolin; Rick Faris - vocals, guitar
2021–2023	2023–2024	2024–2025
Greg Cahill – banjo; Dan Eubanks – vocals, bass; Michael Prewitt - vocals, mandolin; Greg Blake – guitar	Greg Cahill – banjo; Dan Eubanks - vocals, bass; Michael Prewitt – vocals, mandolin; Greg Blake - vocals, guitar	Greg Cahill – banjo; Dan Eubanks - vocals, bass; Brian McCarty – vocals, mandolin; Greg Blake - vocals, guitar
2025–present
Greg Cahill – banjo; Nico Humby - vocals, bass; Brian McCarty – vocals, mandolin; Greg Blake - vocals, guitar

== Discography ==
=== Albums ===
- 1979: Special Consensus Bluegrass Band (Tin Ear)
- 1983: Blue Northerns (Acoustic Revival)
- 1986: Freight Train Boogie (Turquoise)
- 1989: A Hole in My Heart (Turquoise)
- 1991: Hey Y'All (Turquoise)
- 1993: Green Rolling Hills (Turquoise)
- 1995: Roads and Rails (ShyTown)
- 1996: Strong Enough to Bend (Pinecastle)
- 1998: Our Little Town (Pinecastle)
- 2000: 25th Anniversary CD, DVD (Pinecastle)
- 2002: Route 10 (Pinecastle)
- 2005: Everything's Alright (Pinecastle)
- 2007: The Trail of Aching Hearts (Pinecastle)
- 2009: Signs (Pinecastle)
- 2010: 35 (Compass)
- 2012: Scratch Gravel Road (Compass)
- 2014: Country Boy: A Bluegrass Tribute To John Denver (Compass) as Special Consensus & Friends
- 2016: Long I Ride (Compass)
- 2018: Rivers and Roads (Compass)
- 2020: Chicago Barn Dance (Compass)
- 2023: Great Blue North (Compass)
- 2025: Been All Around This World (Compass)

=== As primary artist/contributor ===
- 2001: various artists - In Memory of a Friend: A Tribute to Randall Hylton (Pinecastle) - track 5, "Thirty-Two Acres of Bottom Land"
- 2003: various artists - Blue Ridge Mountain Gospel, Vol. 3 (Pinecastle) - track 8, "When the Walls Come Tumblin' Down"; track 13, "Come Unto Me"
- 2003: various artists - Americana Gospel Series, Vol. 1 (Pinecastle) - track 2-09, "New Jerusalem"
- 2003: various artists - Pinecastle Christmas Gathering (Pinecastle) - track 16, "Go Tell It on the Mountain"
- 2007: various artists - Folksongs Of Illinois #1 (Illinois Humanities Council) - track 1, "Nine Pound Hammer"
- 2008: various artists Bluegrass Jamboree DVD (Pinecastle) - track 12, "Silver Dew on the Bluegrass Tonight"; track 13, "Listening to the Rain"; track 14, "Irish Medley"
- 2013: various artists - Roanoke: The Music of Bill Monroe (Pinecastle) - track 6, "Strawberry Point"
