= Jesse Brock =

American singer-songwriter

- Born: July 18, 1972 (age 54); Decatur, Illinois, USA
- Genres: Bluegrass
- Instruments: Mandolin, Vocals
- Member of: Authentic Unlimited
- Formerly of: CW Brock Family, Lynn Morris Band, Chris Jones & the Nightdrivers, Michael Cleveland & Flamekeeper, Audie Blaylock and Redline, Gibson Brothers and Fast Track
- Website: https://jessebrock.com

Jesse Davis Brock (born July 18, 1972, in Decatur, Illinois) is an American bluegrass artist who plays the mandolin and sings both lead and supporting vocals. He records and tours with the East Tennessee based Authentic Unlimited, which made their stage debut on February 19, 2022, in Asheville, North Carolina. In May 2022, Authentic Unlimited released their first two albums on the Billy Blue Records label. In November 2023, Authentic Unlimited made their debut on the Grand Ole Opry in Nashville, Tennessee, In March 2024, Billy Blue released two additional albums (gospel and bluegrass). In November 2024, the label released their first Christmas album, also on Billy Blue Records.

Jesse's second solo recording entitled "Streamliner" was released in July 2021 by Sound Biscuit.

Jesse resides in Franklin, Tennessee, with his wife Kristine.

Over a career in excess of 40 years, Jesse previously performed with The CW Brock Family, Lynn Morris Band, Chris Jones & the Nightdrivers, Michael Cleveland & Flamekeeper, Audie Blaylock and Redline, The Gibson Brothers and Fast Track.

== Discography ==
- 2002: "Kickin' Grass" - Album (Pinecastle)
- July, 2021: "Streamliner" - Album (Sound Biscuit)
- March 2021: "Kiss On A Cold, Cold Stone" - single (Sound Biscuit)
- June 2021: "Black Rock City" - Single (Sound Biscuit)

== Awards ==
=== Individual ===
2009 IBMA Mandolin Player of the Year

2015 IBMA Mandolin Player of the Year

2024 IBMA Mandolin Player of the Year

2026 SPBGMA Mandolin Player of the Year

=== Group ===
2009 IBMA Instrumental Band of the Year (Michael Cleveland & Flamekeeper)
2009 IBMA Instrumental Recorded Performance of the Year ("Jerusalem Ridge" with Michael Cleveland & Flamekeeper)
2008 IBMA Instrumental Band of the Year (Michael Cleveland & Flamekeeper)
2007 IBMA Instrumental Band of the Year (Michael Cleveland & Flamekeeper)

2023 IBMA New Artist of the Year (Authentic Unlimited)

2023 IBMA Vocal Group of the Year (Authentic Unlimited)

2024 IBMA Vocal Group of the Year (Authentic Unlimited)

2024 IBMA Song of the Year (Authentic Unlimited for "Fall in Tennessee")

2024 IBMA Music Video of the Year (tie) (Authentic Unlimited for "Fall in Tennessee")

2025 IBMA Vocal Group of the Year (Authentic Unlimited)
