= The Boxcars =

American bluegrass band

- Genre: Bluegrass music
- Label: Mountain Home Records
- Past members: John R. Bowman; Adam Steffey; Ron Stewart; Keith Garrett; Harold Nixon; Gary Hultman
- Website: www.theboxcars.com

The Boxcars were an American bluegrass band. In addition to being Grammy-nominated, the band has received numerous International Bluegrass Music Awards both as a group and individually.

== History ==
The Boxcars were founded by Adam Steffey, Ron Stewart, Keith Garrett, John Bowman, and Harold Nixon. They released their debut self-titled album in 2010 and were nominated for numerous International Bluegrass Music Awards the year after. In 2014, Bowman left the group to focus on his career of preaching and singing in churches, releasing a solo album in June of that year. Bowman was replaced by Gary Hultman in June 2014.

The group disbanded in 2017.

== Discography ==
| Title | Album details | Peak positions |
| Title | Album details | US Bluegrass |
|---|---|---|
| The Boxcars | Release date: October 19, 2010; Label: Mountain Home Records | — |
| All In | Release date: March 27, 2012; Label: Mountain Home Records | 12 |
| It's Just a Road | Release date: April 30, 2013; Label: Mountain Home Records | — |
| Familiar with the Ground | Release date: March 18, 2016; Label: Mountain Home Records | 4 |
"—" denotes releases that did not chart

== Awards and nominations ==
| Year | Association | Category | Result |
|---|---|---|---|
| 2015 | International Bluegrass Music Awards | Instrumental Performers of the Year – Mandolin – (Adam Steffey) | Nominated |
| 2015 | International Bluegrass Music Awards | Instrumental Performers of the Year – Banjo – (Ron Stewart) | Nominated |
| 2014 | Grammy Awards | Grammy Award for Best Bluegrass Album | Nominated |
| 2014 | International Bluegrass Music Awards | Instrumental Group of the Year | Nominated |
| 2014 | International Bluegrass Music Awards | Song of the Year | Nominated |
| 2014 | International Bluegrass Music Awards | Album of the Year | Nominated |
| 2014 | International Bluegrass Music Awards | Gospel Record Performance of the Year | Nominated |
| 2014 | International Bluegrass Music Awards | Instrumental Recorded Performance of the Year | Nominated |
| 2014 | International Bluegrass Music Awards | Instrumental Performers of the Year – Banjo – (Ron Stewart) | Nominated |
| 2014 | International Bluegrass Music Awards | Instrumental Performers of the Year – Mandolin – (Adam Steffey) | Won |
| 2014 | International Bluegrass Music Awards | Instrumental Performers of the Year – Fiddle – (Ron Stewart) | Nominated |
| 2013 | International Bluegrass Music Awards | Instrumental Group of the Year | Won |
| 2013 | International Bluegrass Music Awards | Instrumental Performers of the Year – Mandolin – (Adam Steffey) | Won |
| 2011 | Create The Curve | Artistic Excellence | Won |
| 2011 | International Bluegrass Music Awards | Instrumental Group of the Year | Won |
| 2011 | International Bluegrass Music Awards | Emerging Artist of the Year | Won |
