= I Just Want to Thank You Lord =

Song written by Judy Marshall

"I Just Want to Thank You Lord" is an American gospel and bluegrass song written by Judy Marshall (born 1951) of the Marshall Family of West Virginia. It was released in 1975 on the Marshall Family's "Come Springtime" album one year after the group came to the public eye after performing with Ralph Stanley at a large bluegrass festival. The song was the title song on Larry Sparks's album "I Just Want to Thank You Lord," which was nominated for Bluegrass Album of the Year at the 41st GMA Dove Awards in 2010. The song is featured in the book, Southern Sounds From The North.
