= Dailey & Vincent =

American bluegrass music group

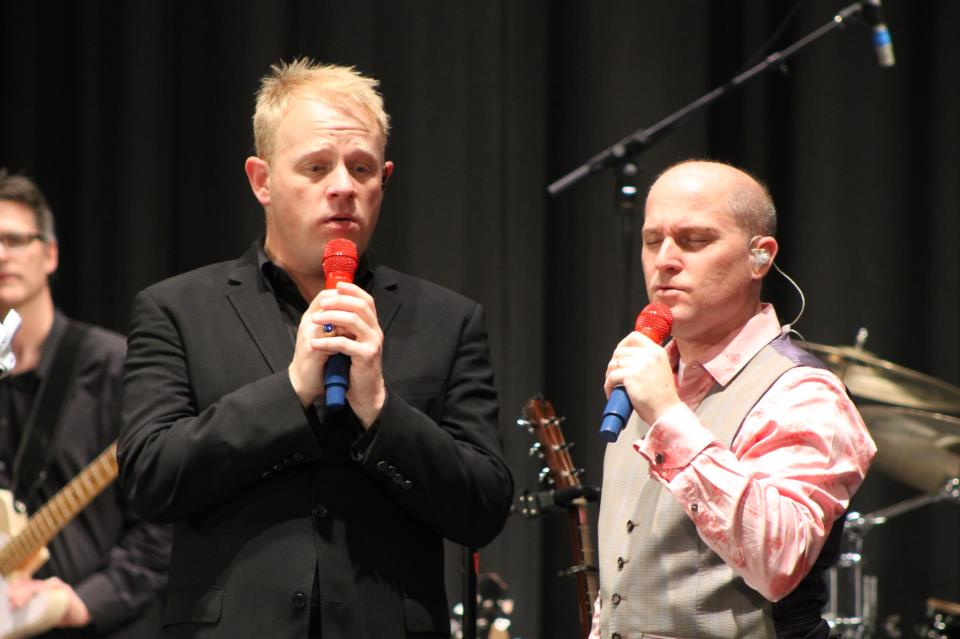
- Dailey & Vincent live in Cookeville, Tennessee on January 12, 2013

Background information
- Origin: Nashville, Tennessee, U.S.
- Genres: Bluegrass, Bluegrass Gospel, Country
- Years active: 2007-present
- Label: Rounder BMG Gaither
- Website: www.daileyvincent.com

Dailey & Vincent is an American bluegrass music band led by Jamie Dailey (guitar, bass, vocals) and Darrin Vincent (bass, guitar, mandolin, vocals).

The duo has released nine albums since 2007, seven of these for Rounder Records, with all the albums having charted on at least one Billboard albums chart. They have also won twenty awards from the International Bluegrass Music Association and twenty-three awards from SPBGMA (The Society for the Preservation of Bluegrass Music of America). In 2011, they received a Grammy Award nomination for Best Country Performance by a Duo or Group with Vocal for their cover of Elizabeth, and won the 2011 Dove Award for Best Bluegrass Album with "Singing From The Heart" In 2013, Dailey & Vincent received their second Grammy Award nomination for Best Bluegrass Album for their album "The Gospel Side Of Dailey & Vincent" and in 2014, their third Grammy Award nomination for their album Brothers of the Highway.

== Background ==
Jamie Dailey was formerly the lead vocalist and guitarist for Doyle Lawson & Quicksilver from 1999-2008. Darrin Vincent was formerly a baritone vocalist with Ricky Skaggs' band Kentucky Thunder also from 1999–2008, and was also part of his father Johnny Vincent's family group The Sally Mountain Show. Norman Adams was promoting Quicksilver during that time. When Dailey & Vincent met and expressed interest in fronting a band together, having known the two for nearly a decade, Adams agreed to promote their efforts and book their concerts.

== Discography ==
=== Albums ===
Title	Details	Peak chart positions						Sales
Title	Details	US Grass	US Country	US	US Heat	US Indie	US Christ	Sales
Dailey & Vincent	Release date: January 29, 2008; Label: Rounder; Formats: CD, vinyl, digital download	1	57	—	—	—	—	
Brothers from Different Mothers	Release date: March 31, 2009; Label: Rounder; Formats: CD, digital download	1	44	—	33	—	—	
Singing from the Heart	Release date: October 20, 2009; Label: Rounder; Formats: CD, digital download	7	—	—	—	—	—	
Dailey & Vincent Sing the Statler Brothers^{A}	Release date: February 1, 2010; Label: Rounder/Cracker Barrel; Formats: CD, digital download	1	19	120	1	14	—	
The Gospel Side of Dailey & Vincent^{A}	Release date: January 9, 2012; Label: Rounder/Cracker Barrel; Formats: CD, digital download	1	—	61	—	8	3	
Brothers of the Highway	Release date: May 7, 2013; Label: Rounder; Formats: CD, digital download	2	40	—	—	—	—	
Alive! In Concert^{A}	Release date: April 27, 2015; Label: Rounder/Cracker Barrel; Formats: CD, digital download	1	28	—	—	18	—	
Patriots & Poets	Release date: March 31, 2017; Label: Dreamlined/BFD; Formats: CD, digital download	2	—	—	—	—	—	US: 4,000
Sounds of Christmas featuring Dolly Parton and Ricky Scaggs	Release date: October 12, 2018; Label: BMG; Formats: CD, digital download	1	—	—	—	20	38	US: 11,900
Let's Sing Some Country	Release date: September 16, 2022; Label: BMG; Formats: CD, digital download							
A Beautiful Life	Release date: June 12, 2026; Formats: CD, vinyl, digital download							
"—" denotes releases that did not chart

- ^{A}Physical CD available exclusively at Cracker Barrel Old Country Store.

=== Music videos ===
Year	Video	Director
2009	"On the Other Side"	Julian Smith
2013	"Steel Drivin' Man"	Matt Butler
2013	"When I Stop Dreaming"	
2017	"That Feel Good Music"	
2017	"Unsung Heroes"	

== Awards ==
Year	Association	Category	Result
2008	International Bluegrass Music Association	Entertainer of the Year	Won
2008	International Bluegrass Music Association	Vocal Group of the Year	Won
2008	International Bluegrass Music Association	Male Vocalist Of The Year ("Jamie Dailey")	Won
2008	International Bluegrass Music Association	Album Of The Year ("Dailey & Vincent")	Won
2008	International Bluegrass Music Association	Song Of The Year ("By the Mark")	Nominated
2008	International Bluegrass Music Association	Gospel Recorded Performance Of The Year ("By The Mark")	Won
2008	International Bluegrass Music Association	Emerging Artist of the Year	Won
2008	International Bluegrass Music Association	Bass Player Of The Year ("Darrin Vincent")	Nominated
2009	SPBGMA Awards	Bluegrass Album Of The Year ("Dailey & Vincent")	Nominated
2009	SPBGMA Awards	Bass Fiddle Performer Of The Year ("Darrin Vincent")	Won
2009	SPBGMA Awards	Contemporary Male Vocalist Of The Year ("Jamie Dailey")	Won
2009	SPBGMA Awards	Contemporary Gospel Group Of The Year	Won
2009	SPBGMA Awards	Vocal Group Of The Year	Won
2009	SPBGMA Awards	Bluegrass Band Of The Year	Won
2009	SPBGMA Awards	Song Of the Year ("By The Mark")	Won
2009	SPBGMA Awards	Entertaining Group Of The Year	Nominated
2009	SPBGMA Awards	Entertainer Of The Year ("Jamie Dailey")	Nominated
2009	International Bluegrass Music Association	Entertainer of the Year	Won
2009	International Bluegrass Music Association	Vocal Group of the Year	Won
2009	International Bluegrass Music Association	Male Vocalist Of The Year (Jamie Dailey)	Nominated
2009	International Bluegrass Music Association	Album Of The Year ("Brothers From Different Mothers")	Nominated
2009	International Bluegrass Music Association	Gospel Recorded Performance of the Year ("On the Other Side")	Won
2009	International Bluegrass Music Association	Bass Player Of The Year ("Darrin Vincent")	Nominated
2010	SPBGMA Awards	Bass Fiddle Performer Of The Year ("Darrin Vincent")	Won
2010	SPBGMA Awards	Contemporary Male Vocalist Of The Year ("Jamie Dailey")	Won
2010	SPBGMA Awards	Contemporary Gospel Group Of The Year	Won
2010	SPBGMA Awards	Vocal Group Of The Year	Won
2010	SPBGMA Awards	Bluegrass Band Of The Year	Nominated
2010	SPBGMA Awards	Entertaining Group Of The Year	Nominated
2010	SPBGMA Awards	Entertainer Of The Year ("Jamie Dailey")	Nominated
2010	International Bluegrass Music Association	Entertainer of the Year	Won
2010	International Bluegrass Music Association	Vocal Group of the Year	Won
2010	International Bluegrass Music Association	Male Vocalist Of The Year (Jamie Dailey)	Nominated
2010	International Bluegrass Music Association	Album of the Year (Dailey & Vincent Sing the Statler Brothers)	Won
2010	International Bluegrass Music Association	Recorded Performance of the Year ("Give This Message To Your Heart w/Larry Stephenson")	Won
2010	International Bluegrass Music Association	Gospel Recorded Performance of the Year ("Don't You Wanna Go To Heaven")	Nominated
2010	International Bluegrass Music Association	Bass Player Of The Year ("Darrin Vincent")	Nominated
2011	SPBGMA Awards	Bluegrass Album Of The Year ("Dailey & Vincent: Sing The Statler Brothers")	Won
2011	SPBGMA Awards	Bass Fiddle Performer Of The Year ("Darrin Vincent")	Won
2011	SPBGMA Awards	Contemporary Male Vocalist Of The Year ("Jamie Dailey")	Won
2011	SPBGMA Awards	Contemporary Gospel Group Of The Year	Won
2011	SPBGMA Awards	Vocal Group Of The Year	Won
2011	SPBGMA Awards	Bluegrass Band Of The Year	Won
2011	SPBGMA Awards	Song Of the Year ("Do You Know You Are My Sunshine")	Nominated
2011	SPBGMA Awards	Entertaining Group Of The Year	Won
2011	SPBGMA Awards	Entertainer Of The Year ("Jamie Dailey")	Nominated
2011	International Bluegrass Music Association	Entertainer of the Year	Nominated
2011	International Bluegrass Music Association	Vocal Group of the Year	Nominated
2011	International Bluegrass Music Association	Male Vocalist Of The Year ("Jamie Dailey")	Nominated
2011	Grammy Award	Best Country Performance by a Duo or Group with Vocals ("Elizabeth")	Nominated
2011	Dove Awards	Bluegrass Album of the Year (Singing from the Heart)	Won
2012	SPBGMA Awards	Bass Fiddle Performer Of The Year ("Darrin Vincent")	Won
2012	SPBGMA Awards	Contemporary Male Vocalist Of The Year ("Jamie Dailey")	Won
2012	SPBGMA Awards	Contemporary Gospel Group Of The Year	Won
2012	SPBGMA Awards	Vocal Group Of The Year	Won
2012	SPBGMA Awards	Bluegrass Band Of The Year	Won
2012	SPBGMA Awards	Entertaining Group Of The Year	Nominated
2012	SPBGMA Awards	Entertainer Of The Year ("Jamie Dailey")	Won
2012	International Bluegrass Music Association	Entertainer of the Year	Nominated
2012	International Bluegrass Music Association	Vocal Group of the Year	Nominated
2012	International Bluegrass Music Association	Male Vocalist Of The Year ("Jamie Dailey")	Nominated
2013	SPBGMA Awards	Bass Fiddle Performer Of The Year ("Darrin Vincent")	Nominated
2013	SPBGMA Awards	Contemporary Male Vocalist Of The Year ("Jamie Dailey")	Nominated
2013	SPBGMA Awards	Contemporary Gospel Group Of The Year	Won
2013	SPBGMA Awards	Vocal Group Of The Year	Won
2013	SPBGMA Awards	Bluegrass Band Of The Year	Won
2013	SPBGMA Awards	Entertaining Group Of The Year	Nominated
2013	SPBGMA Awards	Entertainer Of The Year ("Jamie Dailey")	Nominated
2013	Grammy Award	Best Bluegrass Album ("The Gospel Side Of Dailey & Vincent")	Nominated
