= Mountain Home Records =

- Parent company: Crossroads Label Group
- Founded: 1991
- Founder: Mickey Gamble, Tim Surrett
- Distributor(s): Syntax Distribution
- Genre: Bluegrass, country
- Country of origin: U.S.
- Location: Arden, North Carolina
- Official website: mountainhomemusiccompany.com

Mountain Home Records is a record label based in Arden, North Carolina specializing in bluegrass music.

== History ==
Crossroads was launched in 1984 as a recording studio, Tim Surrett and Mickey Gamble started Mountain Home as a subsidiary label in 1993 at first to release bluegrass gospel music. Soon the label broadened its scope to include secular music, as well.

At the 2014 International Bluegrass Music Association (IBMA) awards, Mountain Home artists received six awards. At the 2017 IBMA Awards, Mountain Home artists garnered 20 award nominations.

Pisgah Ridge Records, an imprint of Mountain Home Records established in 2012, is dedicated to special projects and development of new artists.

== Artists ==
Here is a partial list of artists who have released recordings on the Mountain Home label.

- Unspoken Tradition
- Darin and Brooke Aldridge
- Balsam Range
- Kristin Scott Benson
- John Bowman
- The Boxcars
- Dale Ann Bradley
- Gina Clowes
- Flatt Lonesome
- The Grascals
- Joe Isaacs / Family and Friends
- David Johnson
- Mark Johnson
- Chris Jones and the Night Drivers
- Doyle Lawson and Quicksilver
- Lonesome River Band
- Michael Melito
- New Tradition
- Newfound Road
- NewTown
- Tony Rice
- Danny Roberts
- Rochesters
- Jerry Salley
- Larry Sparks
- Snyder Family Band
- Adam Steffey
- Donna Ulisse

== See also ==
- List of record labels
