= Michael Cleveland =

American bluegrass fiddle player

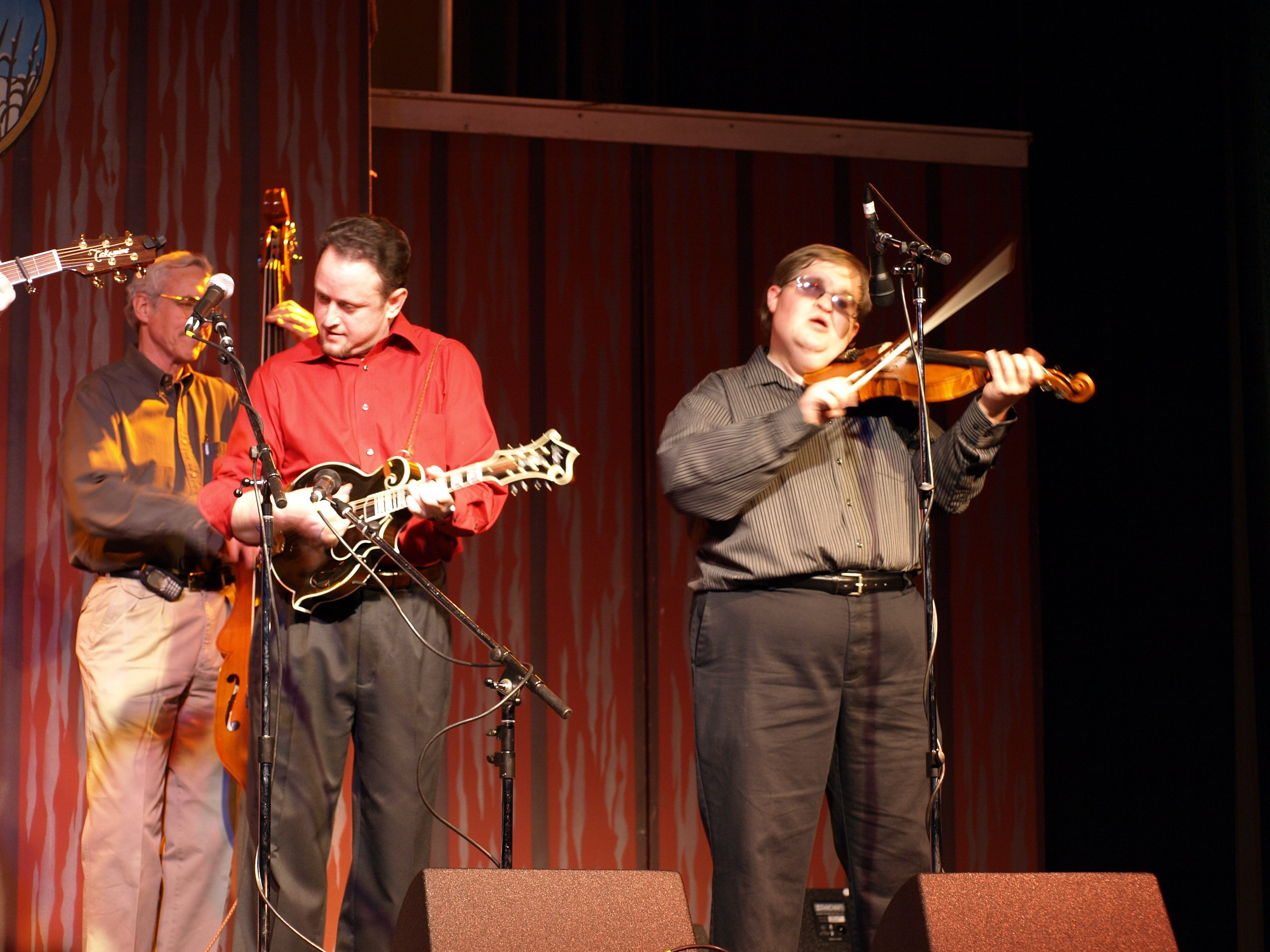
- Cleveland (right) performing with Jesse Brock (left) in 2008

Background information
- Born: Charles Michael Cleveland; September 18, 1980 (age 46); Henryville, Indiana, U.S.
- Genres: Bluegrass; country; American folk
- Instruments: Fiddle, mandolin
- Years active: 1994–present
- Label: Rounder
- Website: https://www.flamekeeperband.com/

Charles Michael Cleveland (born September 18, 1980) is an American bluegrass fiddle player. He also plays the mandolin.

== Early life ==
Cleveland was born in Henryville, Indiana. He was born completely blind and a childhood ear infection caused him to lose 80% of his hearing in one ear. He first learned to play violin at a local Suzuki program when he was 4 years old. His skill was recognized at an early age, with appearances on the Grand Ole Opry, A Prairie Home Companion and before the United States Congress in his early teens.

After graduating from the Kentucky School for the Blind, he performed with various musicians including Dale Ann Bradley and Rhonda Vincent.

As of 2020, he was living in Charlestown, Indiana.

== Awards and honors ==
His first solo project on Rounder Records, Flame Keeper, won Cleveland the International Bluegrass Music Association Fiddler of the Year award in 2002, and he shared the same award with Ben Jameson in 2005 for Tom Adams and Michael Cleveland Live at the Ragged Edge. His third IBMA award came for his 2006 album Let 'Er Go, Boys!.

Cleveland won the IBMA (International Bluegrass Music Awards) 2015 Fiddle Player of the Year and the 2010 Instrumental Group of the Year with his band Flamekeeper, for the third year. Cleveland had previously won Fiddle Player of the Year in 2001, 2002, 2004, 2006, 2007, 2008, 2009, 2010 and 2011.

In 2018 Cleveland was nominated for a Grammy Award for Best Bluegrass Album for his solo album, Fiddler's Dream. Two years later, he won in the same category with his album Tall Fiddler.

Officials from Charlestown, Indiana designated February 5, 2020, as Michael Cleveland Day in recognition of his Grammy award for his Tall Fiddler album.

He is a recipient of a 2022 National Heritage Fellowship awarded by the National Endowment for the Arts, which is the United States government's highest honor in the folk and traditional arts.

In 2024, Cleveland received the Bluegrass Star Award from the Bluegrass Heritage Foundation of Dallas, Texas. The award is bestowed upon bluegrass artists who do an exemplary job of advancing traditional bluegrass music while preserving its character and heritage.

== Touring ==
In 2007, Cleveland and his band Flamekeeper entertained as part of the Bluegrass Sundays Winter Concert Series in Toronto, Ontario, Canada. The group performed at the Sally Creek Music Festival in Thames Centre, Ontario, in July, 2010.

In 2022, Cleveland joined Béla Fleck's touring band for My Bluegrass Heart.

== Discography ==
=== Solo albums ===
- Sawing on the "C" String (self released) 1998
- Flame Keeper (Rounder) 2002
- Let Er Go Boys (Rounder) 2006
- Fiddler's Dream (Compass) 2016
- Tall Fiddler (Compass) 2019
- Lovin' of the Game (Compass) 2023

=== With Tom Adams ===
- Live at the Ragged Edge (Rounder Records) 2004

=== Michael Cleveland and Flamekeeper ===
- Leavin' Town (Rounder Records) 2008
- Fired Up (Rounder Records) 2011
- On Down The Line (Compass Records) 2014
