= Tom Adams (bluegrass musician) =

American musician

- Born: November 7, 1958 (age 67); Gettysburg, Pennsylvania
- Genres: Bluegrass; American folk
- Instrument(s): banjo, guitar
- Labels: Rounder Records, Not On Label

Tom Adams (born November 17, 1958) is an American bluegrass guitarist and banjo player.

Adams began his career in 1969, playing banjo in his family bluegrass band in Gettysburg, Pennsylvania. In 1983 he joined Jimmy Martin's Sunny Mountain Boys, and then became one of the Johnson Mountain Boys in 1986. Adams played with Rhonda Vincent & The Rage in 2000, He recorded an album, Live - At the Ragged Edge, with Michael Cleveland in 2004, and the album was awarded "Bluegrass Instrumental Album of The Year 2004" by the International Bluegrass Music Association.

Adams has also played with Dale Ann Bradley, in the Lynn Morris band, and later with Bill Emerson & Sweet Dixie. In 2009 Adams joined Michael Cleaveland and Flamekeeper as a singer and guitar player.

== Discography ==
Solo albums

- Warhorse (Not On Label) 1989
- Right Hand Man (Rounder Records Corp.) 1990
- Adams County Banjo (Rounder Select) 2001

With Tony Furtado and Tony Trischka

- Rounder Banjo Extravaganza (Rounder Records) 1992

With Michael Cleveland

- Live at the Ragged Edge (Rounder Records) 2004
