= Eddie Stubbs =

American radio personality

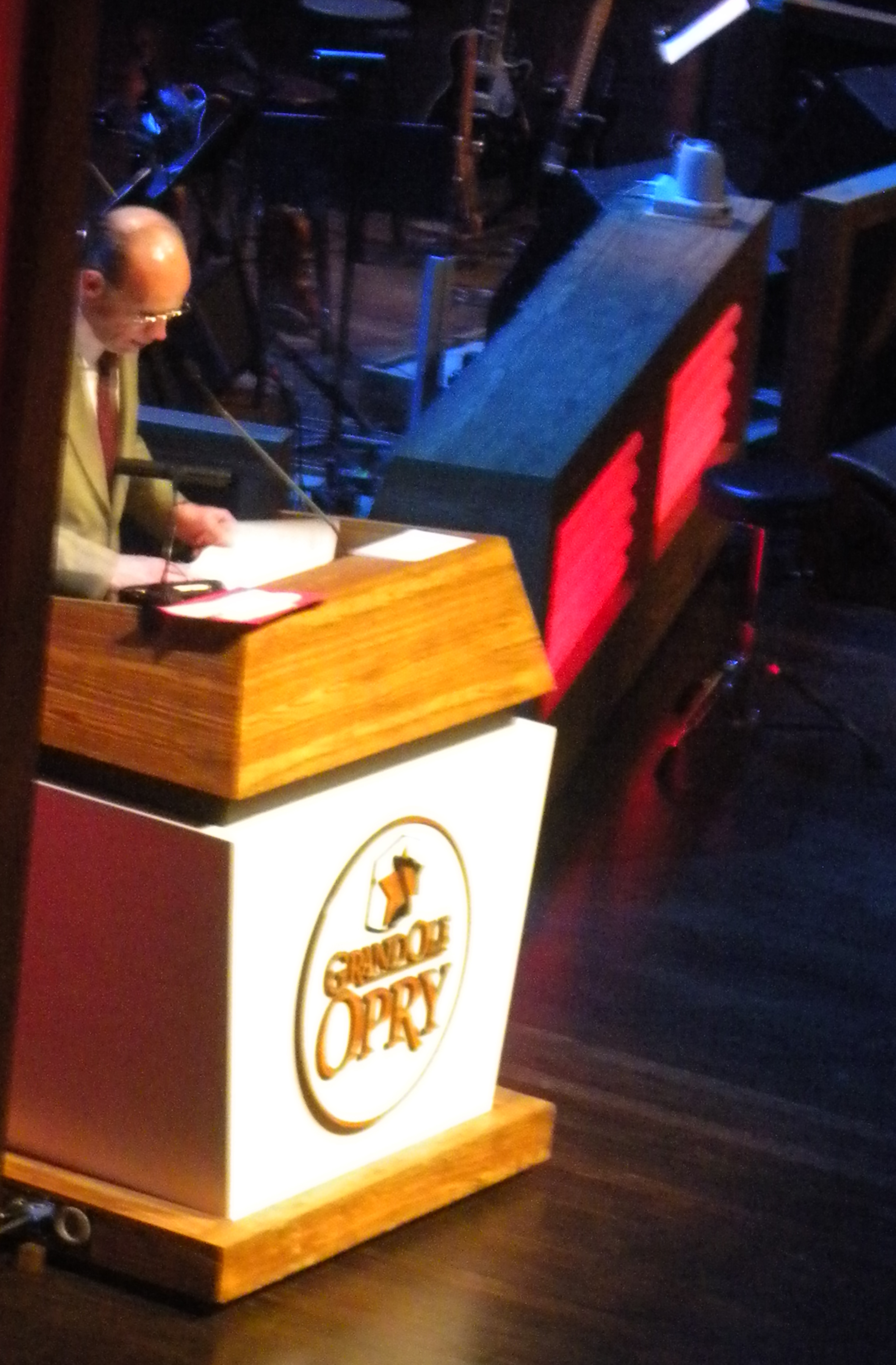
- Stubbs at the Grand Ole Opry on March 23, 2012.
- Born: November 25, 1961 (age 64); Gaithersburg, Maryland, U.S.
- Presenting career
- Show: The Eddie Stubbs Show
- Station: WSM
- Time slot: 7:00 pm to Midnight
- Style: Country music
- Country: United States
- Website: http://wsmonline.com

Eddie Stubbs (born November 25, 1961) is an American radio disc jockey. Stubbs is best known for his work and promotion of country music on WSM, a radio station with a nighttime clear channel signal broadcast from Nashville, Tennessee, United States. He was also one of two regular announcers for the long-running Grand Ole Opry carried on WSM on Tuesday, Friday and Saturday nights.

He was on the air on weekday evenings from 7 pm to midnight, Central Time, on WSM. WSM's powerful nighttime clear channel signal allows WSM to be heard in a large part of the US and Canada. As a result, Stubbs has many regular listeners in all parts of the US and Canada in areas far away from Nashville.

A fifth-generation resident of Montgomery County, Maryland, he graduated from Gaithersburg High School and became a fiddle player with a traditional bluegrass band, The Johnson Mountain Boys. After a decade, the band split up and Stubbs has only played sporadically since. Stubbs's first radio job was a weekly bluegrass show for WYII in Williamsport, Maryland, in 1983 where he earned $20 per program. In 1984, he was hired by WAMU in Washington, D.C., and worked alongside the veteran country deejay Gary Henderson. He received his own show in 1990 but continued to do odd jobs such as house-painting to supplement his income. "No one gets rich in radio," he observed. The Eddie Stubbs Show on WAMU was discontinued in April 2007.

He developed a friendship with the country singer Kitty Wells and her husband, the guitar player and singer Johnnie Wright, and played with them during D.C. area appearances. They eventually convinced Stubbs to move to Nashville in 1995 and join them full-time. But within seventeen days of arriving in the country music capital, he was hired by The Grand Ole Opry as a regular announcer. "Five people up for the job, and the new kid in town gets the gig? If that's not God, I don't know what is," said Stubbs.

In 2002, Stubbs was named the Country Music Association's Large Market Air Personality of the Year. The alternative weekly, Nashville Scene, named him Best Country Deejay, and he has also been listed in Nashville Life Magazine's "100 Coolest People".

On July 21, 2020, Stubbs announced his retirement from WSM and the Grand Ole Opry, effective July 29, 2020. In October 2020, he was inducted into the International Bluegrass Music Hall of Fame as a member of the Johnson Mountain Boys.
