= Gloria Belle =

American singer (1939-2023)

- Birth name: Gloria Belle Flickinger
- Born: June 9, 1939
- Died: May 5, 2023 (aged 83)
- Genres: Bluegrass
- Occupation: Performance artist
- Instrument(s): Vocals, banjo, bass, and mandolin
- Years active: 1957–2023

Gloria Belle Flickinger (June 9, 1939 – May 5, 2023) was an American bluegrass vocalist and musician, playing the banjo, bass, and mandolin. She was probably the first female lead singer in bluegrass, having begun her music career as early as 1957.

== Life and career ==
While not a native of the area, Belle's early career centered on east Tennessee and western North Carolina. She was a performer on the Cas Walker show in Knoxville, Tennessee, in the early 1960s, beginning that position in September 1960. In 1965, she played with Raymond Fairchild in Maggie Valley, North Carolina, at the Ghost Town in the Sky. The next year, she made regular appearances on the Wheeling Jamboree in West Virginia, performing with Betty Amos's All-Girl Band. Most notably, she performed as a member of Jimmy Martin's Sunny Mountain Boys during 1968–1975. With Jimmy, she sang lead and high baritone on multiple recordings, as well as played bass. She later toured the festival circuit with Charlie Monroe in 1973. She toured Japan with Martin during 1975. In regards to her playing, Martin said jokingly, "She’s not very good, but we let her sing with us ‘cause we feel sorry for her."

Belle died on May 5, 2023, at the age of 83.

== Awards and distinctions ==
In 1999, Belle was presented with the Distinguished Achievement Award by the International Bluegrass Music Association (IBMA) and became one of the few females to ever earn that award. In 2001 she also received an IBMA award for Recorded Event of the Year for Follow Me Back To the Fold: A Tribute to Women in Bluegrass. Another IBMA award came in 2009 through her work with the Daughters of Bluegrass. She received a Recorded Event of the Year award with this group for "Proud to be a Daughter of Bluegrass." She fronted the band Tennessee Sunshine, which she formed in 1990. She married guitar luthier Mike Long of Mike Long Guitars on September 23, 1989. They resided in Nashville, Tennessee.

== Discography ==
=== Solo albums ===
- 1968: Sings and Plays Bluegrass in the Country (Rebel R-1479)
- 1978: A Good Hearted Woman (Southern Belle SB-51978)
- 1986: The Love Of The Mountains (Webco WLPS-0122)

=== Gloria Belle and Tennessee Sunshine ===
- 1992: Living the Right Life Now (Southern Belle SB-110892)
- 1993: Dixieland for Me (Atteiram API-CD-1689)
- 1996: unknown title (Southern Belle SB-6996)
- 2000: He Leadeth Me (Southern Belle SB-6900)
- 2001: Let My Life Be a Light (Southern Belle SB-6901)

=== Also appears on ===
- 1969: Jimmy Martin - Free Born Man (Decca)
- 1975: Nitty Gritty Dirt Band - Will the Circle be Unbroken (Nitty Gritty Dirt Band album) (United Artists) - track 2-20, "Will the Circle Be Unbroken"
- 2000: Mark Newton - Follow Me Back to the Fold (Rebel)
