= Bill Grant and Delia Bell =

- Origin: Hugo, Oklahoma
- Genre: Bluegrass music
- Years active: 1960–2006
- Labels: Kiamichi Records, County, Rebel, Rounder, Warner Bros.

Bill Grant and Delia Bell were a bluegrass music duo from Oklahoma. Emmylou Harris has said of Delia Bell: "If Hank Williams and Kitty Wells had married and had a daughter, she would have sounded like Delia Bell." Grant was recognized as "Ambassador of Bluegrass Music" by three Oklahoma governors.

== Biography ==
=== Early career ===
Delia Bell was born Francis Leona Nowell on April 16, 1935, in Bonham, Texas. Bell moved to Hugo as a child. She started playing music with her sisters and brother as a child, and began singing in her teens. She married Bobby Bell in 1959.

Bill Grant was born Billy Joe Grant on May 9, 1930, a Choctaw tribal member, and grew up on a ranch near Hugo, Oklahoma. Inspired by the music of Bill Monroe, he took up mandolin.

In 1959, Bell began singing with Bobby's friend Bill Grant. Bell accompanied herself on guitar, and Bill Grant played mandolin, and Bell sang tenor to Grant's lead. In 1960, Bell and Grant were regulars on the Little Dixie Hayride radio show on KIHN radio.

When Bill Monroe heard them perform, he invited them to perform at his festivals in Bean Blossom, Indiana. This introduced the duo to a wider audience.

=== Performing and recording career ===
In the late 1960s, Grant and Bell formed the Kiamichi Mountain Boys (also known as the Bonham Brothers), named after the Kiamichi Mountains near their home.

They recorded more than a dozen albums for their own label Kiamichi Records as well as albums on County Records, Rebel Records, Rounder Records, and Warner Brothers. They toured England and Ireland 11 times during the 1970s.

The Kiamichi Mountain Boys were disbanded in 1980. After that, Grant and Bell worked either worked with the Johnson Mountain Boys or as a mandolin/guitar duo.

Emmylou Harris picked up Bell's solo album Bluer Than Midnight at a California record shop. Impressed by Bell's version of Ruth Franks' song "Roses In The Snow", Harris recorded it as the title track of her 1980 bluegrass album. In 1982, Harris produced Bell's self-titled solo album on Warner Bros. Records. One of the songs, "Flame in My Heart", was a duet with John Anderson. The album reached #35 on the Billboard charts, but Warner Bros. dropped her and other artists from their roster.

During the 1980s, Bell and Grant recorded three albums for Rounder featuring accompaniment and harmonies by members of the Johnson Mountain Boys and Del McCoury. The 1989 album Dreaming collected songs from their Rounder albums.

Bell and Grant continued to perform as a duo until 2006 when their partnership ended. Grant was diagnosed with a brain tumor which was successfully removed, and he recovered. In 2007, Grant began singing on a limited basis with his stepdaughter Amy Patrick.

=== Awards ===
In 2006, Grant received the International Bluegrass Music Association (IBMA) Distinguished Achievement award.

Grant and Bell have each been recognized as a Pioneer of Bluegrass Music by the International Bluegrass Music Hall of Fame and Museum in Owensboro, Kentucky.

Grant was also inducted in to the Oklahoma Music Hall of Fame.

=== Salt Creek Park ===
From 1969 until 2003, Grant hosted Grant's Bluegrass Festival on a 360-acre cattle ranch near Hugo. He named the festival site "Salt Creek Park".

In 1987, Bell and Grant also launched a March Early Bird Bluegrass Show, which was staged annually for almost 20 years.

== Deaths ==
Delia Bell died on June 15, 2018, at age 83. Bill Grant died on July 9, 2019, at age 90.

== Discography ==
=== Bill Grant and Delia Bell ===
- 1979: In England (Kama KZ 1007)
- 1980: Bill Grant & Delia Bell (Rebel REB 1593)
- 1981: Rollin’ (Rebel REB-1604)
- 1984: The Cheer of the Home Fires (Rounder 0187)
- 1985: A Few Dollars More (Rounder 0217)
- 1988: Following a Feeling (Rounder 0257)
- 1989: Dreaming (Rounder 0427, CD in 1997) compilation (1989)
- 1997: Kiamichi Moon (Old Homestead OHS-90213)

=== Delia Bell ===
- 1978: Bluer Than Midnight (County 768)
- 1983: Delia Bell (Warner Bros.) reissued in 2006 on Wounded Bird

=== With The Kiamichi Mountain Boys ===
- 1972: Bill Grant, Delia Bell and the Kiamichi Mountain Boys (Kiamichi KMB 101) reissued in 1976 as My Kiamichi Mountain Home
- 1974: Kiamichi Country (Kiamichi KMB 102) reissued in 1988 with same title (Old Homestead OHS-90186)
- 1975: There Is a Fountain (Kiamichi KMB 103)
- 1976: Fourteen Memories (Kiamichi KMB 104)
- 1976: The Last Christmas Tree (Kiamichi KMB 105)
- 1978: My Pathway Leads to Oklahoma (Kiamichi KMB 107)
- 1979: The Blues Mountain Style (Kiamichi KMB 108) reissued in 1988
- 1980: Man in the Middle (Kiamichi KMB 108) reissued in 1988 with same title (Old Homestead OHS-70077)
