= Gibson Brothers (bluegrass duo) =

American singer-songwriter

The Gibson Brothers
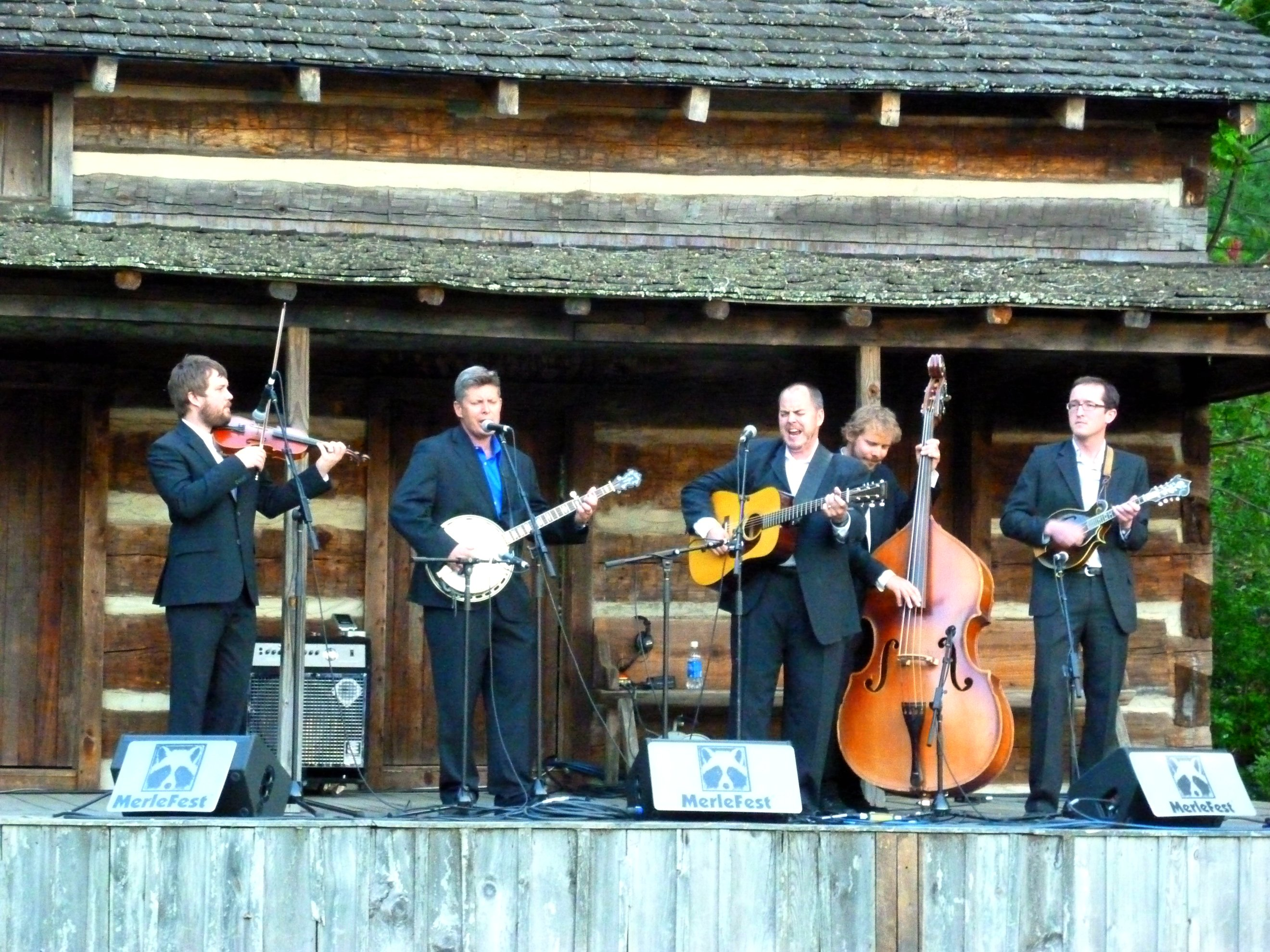
- The Gibson Brothers playing at MerleFest in 2010

Background information
- Origin: Plattsburgh, New York, U.S.
- Genres: Bluegrass; Americana
- Years active: 1987–present
- Labels: Rounder; Compass; Sugar Hill; Hay Holler
- Members: Eric Gibson; Leigh Gibson; Mike Barber
- Website: gibsonbrothers.com

The Gibson Brothers is an American bluegrass band which has performed professionally since the late 1980s.

The International Bluegrass Music Association (IBMA) awarded the Gibson Brothers Emerging Artist of the Year honors in 1998 following the Alan O'Bryant produced album Another Night of Waiting on the Hay Holler label. They debuted on the Grand Ole Opry on April 11, 2003. "Ring the Bell" (written by Chet O'Keefe) won Song of the Year and Gospel Recorded Performance of the Year in 2010. Their first tour abroad was to Ireland and then Germany in 2010. In 2012 they returned to Germany with stops in Denmark, France, and Italy. The brothers debuted on Garrison Keillor's A Prairie Home Companion on October 4, 2014, at the Fitzgerald Theater in St. Paul, Minnesota, and returned on January 17, 2015.

== Awards ==
=== International Bluegrass Music Association Awards ===
- Emerging Artist of the Year – 1998
- Song of the Year – "Ring the Bell" – 2010 and "They Called It Music" - 2013
- Vocal Group of the Year – 2011 and 2013
- Album of the Year – Help My Brother - 2011
- Gospel Recorded Performance of the Year - "Ring the Bell" – 2010 and "Singing as We Rise" – Gibson Brothers with Ricky Skaggs – 2012
- Songwriter of the Year – Eric Gibson - 2013
- Entertainer of the Year – 2012 and 2013

=== Society for the Preservation of Bluegrass Music in America Awards ===
- Bluegrass Album of the Year – Help My Brother – 2012
- Song of the Year – "Help My Brother" – 2012
- Songwriters of the Year – Leigh & Eric Gibson - 2012
- Song of the Year - "They Called It Music" - 2014
- Gospel Group of the Year (Contemporary): The Gibson Brothers - 2015
- Vocal Group of the Year: The Gibson Brothers - 2015

=== Bluegrass Unlimited National Bluegrass Survey ===
Long Forgotten Dream was their first album to appear on the Bluegrass Unlimited (BU) National Bluegrass Survey with four months on the chart; Spread Your Wings followed with three months; and Another Night of Waiting for nine months with a peak ranking of No. 7. In July 2003 "Bona Fide" became their first album to reach No. 1 on the BU National Bluegrass Survey; "A Long Way Back Home" occupied the No. 1 position for four months; "Red Letter Day" for two months; "Iron and Diamonds" for one month; "Ring the Bell" for two months; "Help My Brother" for eight months; and "They Called It Music" for six months.

Singles from their recordings have consistently made the BU Songs Chart with "Long Forgotten Dream" lasting eight months, "Picture in the Moonlight" eleven and "She Paints a Picture" thirteen. The first single to attain No. 1 position was held by "Mountain Song" for two consecutive months; "Ring the Bell" for three; "Farm of Yesterday" for two; "Help My Brother" for three; and "They Called It Music" for three.

=== Honorary degrees ===
On May 16, 2015 both Eric and Leigh received honorary doctorates of fine arts from the State University of New York during the spring commencement at SUNY Plattsburgh.

== Discography ==
=== Albums ===
- 1994: Underneath a Harvest Moon (Big Elm 4194)
- 1996: Long Forgotten Dream (Hay Holler HHH-CD-1201)
- 1997: Spread Your Wings (Hay Holler HH-CD-1335)
- 1998: Another Night of Waiting (Hay Holler HH-CD-1341)
- 2003: Bona Fide (Sugar Hill SUG-CD-3965)
- 2004: A Long Way Back Home (Sugar Hill SUG-CD-3986)
- 2005: Red Letter Day (Sugar Hill SUG-CD-2002)
- 2008: Iron and Diamonds (Sugar Hill SUG-CD-4039)
- 2009: Ring the Bell (Compass 7 4506 2)
- 2011: Help My Brother (Compass 7 4549 2)
- 2013: They Called It Music (Compass 7 4599 2)
- 2015: Brotherhood (Rounder 11661-35986-02)
- 2017: In the Ground (Rounder)
- 2018: Mockingbird (Easy Eye Sound)
- 2023: Darkest Hour (Bull Run Records)

=== As guest artists ===
- 2008: Rick Hayes - Fly by Night (Kang Records kr3222)
- 2010: Joe Walsh - Sweet Loam (Skinny Elephant)
- 2011: Terry Baucom - In a Groove (John Boy and Billy, Inc.)
- 2013: Peter Rowan - The Old School (Compass 7 4600 2)
- 2014: Jon Weisberger - I've Been Mostly Awake (Wise Kings)
