= Bluegrass Unlimited =

American music magazine

- Editor and General Manager: Dan Miller
- Former editors: Peter V. Kuykendall
- Categories: Bluegrass and Old-time music
- Frequency: monthly
- Circulation: 11,330 (2018)
- Founder: Pete Kuykendall, Gary Henderson, Dick Freeland, Dick Spottswood, and Dianne and Vince Sims
- Founded: 1966
- First issue: July 1966
- Company: Bluegrass Music Hall of Fame & Museum
- Country: United States of America
- Based in: Owensboro, Kentucky
- Language: English
- Website: www.bluegrassmusic.com
- ISSN: 0006-5137
- OCLC: 1788602

Bluegrass Unlimited is a monthly music magazine "dedicated to the furtherance of bluegrass and old-time musicians, devotees and associates." First published in 1966, as of 2008 the magazine had a circulation of more than 25,000 copies. Bluegrass Unlimited is a founding member of the International Bluegrass Music Association (IBMA).

Folklorist and music scholar Neil V. Rosenberg, in Bluegrass: A History, sets out the history of Bluegrass Unlimited as the oldest of the nationally distributed bluegrass magazines. The magazine launched, in 1966, in a typed, mimeographed 7– x 8½–inch booklet-like format with a hand drawn logo, and was available for US$3 (equivalent to $29.77 in 2025) per year. In the fall of 1970, the magazine moved from an informal to a full-time operation with new publishers Pete and Marion Kuykendall upgrading it to a larger, standard format on glossy paper. The magazine is full-color and printed on high-speed web offset presses.

Music historian Bill C. Malone has written that Bluegrass Unlimited magazine was initially devoted primarily to bluegrass music in the US and abroad with occasional reference to old time country music. It now reports information on every phase of bluegrass and old-time music - biographical articles, discographies, record and book reviews, concert and festival dates, interviews, classified ads, and songs.

David Freeman, owner of Rebel Records and County Records, said: "When the magazine started publishing, bluegrass was pretty much at a low point. The magazine spread the word and highlighted the artistic aspect of the music, which helped to bring it out of the bars where it was in the 1950s."

In 2020, the Bluegrass Music Hall of Fame & Museum acquired Bluegrass Unlimited.
