= Dale Ann Bradley =

American bluegrass musician

- Born: Bell County, Kentucky, U.S.
- Genres: Bluegrass
- Labels: Compass, Mountain Home, Doobie Shea, Pinecastle
- Website: www.daleannbradley.com

Dale Ann Bradley is an American bluegrass musician. She is a six-time (2007, 2008, 2009, 2011, 2012, and 2021) Female Bluegrass Vocalist of the Year, a distinction given by the International Bluegrass Music Association. She has released music both as a solo artist and as part of the group New Coon Creek Girls.

== Early life ==
Bradley was born in Bell County, Kentucky. Her father was a coal-mining Baptist minister. She grew up without running water or electricity until she was a senior in high school. She also lived with heavy religious restrictions with her father being a minister. She received her first guitar at the age of 14, making a guitar pick out of a plastic milk carton to play.

As a junior in high school, Bradley met a childhood friend of her mother who was also her new band director at school. He and his wife sang at Pine Mountain State Park, located in Pineville, Kentucky, in the summers and invited Bradley to perform with them. She played with the band (Backporch Grass) and recorded a few singles and had the opportunity to perform in front of live audiences.

== Career ==
Bradley auditioned for the New Coon Creek Girls in 1988 but was unsuccessful. For the next couple of years, she worked as a solo artist before finally joining the group in 1991. She released her first solo album, East Kentucky Morning, in 1997. The album was top ten on both the Bluegrass Unlimited chart and the Gavin Americana chart. In early 2015, Bradley left her record label Compass Records for Pinecastle Records, with whom she recorded her first solo album. In late 2015, her 7th album, Pocket Full of Keys received a Grammy nomination for Best Bluegrass Album

From 2012 to 2020, Bradley was a member of the all-female bluegrass band Sister Sadie. Their second album received a nomination for Best Bluegrass Album in 2019.

== Discography ==
Year	Title	Label
1997	East Kentucky Morning	Pinecastle
1999	Old Southern Porches	Pinecastle
2001	Songs of Praise and Glory	Pinecastle
2001	Cumberland River Dreams	Doobie Shea
2004	Send the Angels	Mountain Home
2006	Catch Tomorrow	Compass
2009	Don't Turn Your Back	Compass
2011	Somewhere South of Crazy	Compass
2015	Pocket Full of Keys	Pinecastle
2017	Dale Ann Bradley	Pinecastle
2019	The Hard Way	Pinecastle
2021	Things She Couldn't Get Over	Pinecastle
2023	Kentucky For Me	Pinecastle
