= Pinecastle Records =

- Founded: 1989
- Founder: Tom Riggs
- Distributor: Syntax Creative
- Genre: Bluegrass, country
- Country of origin: U.S.
- Location: Piedmont, South Carolina
- Official website: pinecastlemusic.com

Pinecastle Records is a record label based in Piedmont, South Carolina specializing in supporting and developing bluegrass music artists.

== History ==
Tom Riggs started the Pinecastle Records in 1989 as an outlet for bluegrass pioneer Bill Harrell who wanted an outlet for his son Mitch to release a CD. The label was originally based in Orlando, Florida but moved to Columbus, North Carolina in 2005.

In 1993, Pinecastle purchased Virginia-based Webco Records. They reissued recordings of some Webco artists, such as Larry Stephenson and The Reno Brothers.

In 2002, Riggs received a Distinguished Achievement Award from the International Bluegrass Music Association.

Pinecastle folded in February 2010 due to Rigg's health issues.

Lonnie Lassiter took ownership and reopened Pinecastle on August 1, 2010, naming Ethan Burkhardt as Vice President of Operations and Matt Hood as Vice President of Public Relations.

In 2012, Pinecastle signed with Syntax Creative.

In 2015, Pinecastle awarded a one-song contract to each winner of MerleFest’s Chris Austin Songwriting Competition. The resulting compilation disc was promoted to radio and the public.

== Artists ==
Here is a partial list of artists who have released recordings on the Pinecastle label.

- Eddie & Martha Adcock
- David Aldridge & Brooke Justice
- Kristin Scott Benson
- Wayne Benson
- Beth Stevens & Edge
- Blue Mafia
- BlueRidge
- Dale Ann Bradley
- Jesse Brock
- Ray Cardwell
- Churchmen
- The Circuit Riders
- Continental Divide
- Charlie Cook
- Jack Cooke
- The Dillards
- The Dixie Bee-Liners
- Terry Eldredge
- Bill Emerson
- Flashback
- Grasstowne
- Eddie Hancock
- Bill Harrell
- Brad Hudson
- Jim Hurst & Missy Raines
- Jim & Jesse
- Sally Jones
- Lorraine Jordan & Carolina Road
- Phil Leadbetter
- Edgar Loudermilk
- The McLains
- Jesse McReynolds
- The New Coon Creek Girls
- Newton & Thomas
- New Vintage
- Michelle Nixon
- Nothin' Fancy
- Nu-Blu
- The Osborne Brothers
- David Parmley
- The Rarely Herd
- Redwing
- Reno Brothers
- Kim Robins
- Sister Sadie
- Karl Shiflett & Big Country Show
- Rickie Simpkins
- Special Consensus
- Larry Stephenson
- Mike Stevens
- Ernie Thacker
- Niall Toner
- Town Mountain
- Fred Travers with the Borderline Band
- Scott Vestal
- The Village Singers
- Matt Wallace
- Charlie Waller & The Country Gentlemen
- Marty Warburton
- White House
- Marshall Wilborn
- Josh Williams
- Wildfire
- Williamson Branch

== See also ==
- List of record labels
