= Lynn Morris (musician) =

American bluegrass musician (born 1948)

Lynn Morris (born October 8, 1948) is an American bluegrass musician.

Morris was raised in Lamesa, Texas, where she learned to play piano at the age of 6 and guitar at the age of 11. She went to Colorado College and graduated with a degree in art. The following year she began to play the banjo. She played with bluegrass groups City Limits which she joined in 1972 and Whetstone Run. She toured full-time through various regions including the United States, Canada, and Europe. She also was nominated and joined the IBMA board of directors. After retiring from her tours in 2003 due to a stroke, she became an audio engineer, producing albums like Ron Stewart's (a former bandmate) album Time Stands Still in 2001. She also produced two different DVDs on her primary instrument the banjo in 2007 and 2009 titled "Mel Bay Presents Clawhammer Banjo Taught By Lynn Morris, v.1 and v.2," by Mel Bay Productions.

While she played in a different band, Whetstone Run, from 1980 to 1986, in 1988 she assembled her own group, the Lynn Morris Band, and they began recording for Rounder Records in 1990. Over time, her bandmates have included husband Marshall Wilborn, mandolinist Jesse Brock, singer/guitarist Chris Jones, mandolinist/banjo player Dick Smith, fiddler Tad Marks, banjo/fiddle player Ron Stewart, guitarist/singer Jeff Autry, mandolinist Matt Mundy, mandolinist David McLaughlin, banjoist Tom Adams, guitarist/mandolinist Audie Blaylock, mandolinist Ronnie McCoury and fiddler Stuart Duncan.

In 1996 the Lynn Morris Band performed in Scarborough, Ontario, Canada, as part of the Bluegrass Sundays winter concert series organized by the Northern Bluegrass Committee In 2005 the band entertained at the Gettysburg Bluegrass Festival. They also played venues like the Grand Ole Opry, Leavenworth Federal Penitentiary, and the Library of Congress.

Lynn Morris was also known for being an animal advocate. She was a part of the board S.P.C.A, and she worked under the sponsorship of PetSmart Charities and Spay USA to create a PSA Jingle "Spay Your Pets" in 1998. Also, in May 2002, in Alexandria, Virginia, the Lynn Morris band hosted a 'Pickin for Pets' bluegrass benefit concert. She also owned about 12 rescue cats herself.

== Awards ==
- In 1974 and 1981, she won the National Banjo Championship in Winfield twice, being the first person to do this.
- Her song, “Mama’s Hand,” won the IBMA Song of the Year award in 1996.
- Morris is also a 3-time recipient of IBMA's Female Vocalist of the Year in 1996, 1998, and 1999.
- She also won the IBMA Distinguished Achievement Award in 2010.
- On September 30, 2021, Lynn Morris was inducted into IBMA's Bluegrass Music Hall of Fame.

== Discography ==
with City Limits

- Hello City Limits (1975)
- Live at the Oxford Hotel (1976)

with Whetstone Run

- No Use Frettin' (Red Dog Records, 1984)

As a leader

- The Lynn Morris Band (Rounder Records, 1990)
- The Bramble and the Rose (Rounder Records, 1992)
- Mama's Hand (Rounder Records, 1995)
- You'll Never Be the Sun (Rounder Records, 1999)
- Shape of a Tear (Rounder Records, 2003)
  As a featured artist
  - Oh Christmas Tree (2002)
  - Kickin' Grass (Pinecastle Records, 2002)
  - Root 5: Bass & Banjo (Pinecastle Records, 1999)
