= Larry Sparks =

American singer-songwriter (born 1947)

- Born: Larry Eugene Sparks; September 25, 1947 (age 78)
- Genres: Bluegrass, gospel
- Occupation: Singer
- Instrument: Guitar
- Years active: 1963-present
- Labels: Rebel, Rural Rhythm, Old Homestead
- Website: www.larrysparksmusic.com

Larry Eugene Sparks (born September 25, 1947) is an American Bluegrass singer and guitarist. He was the winner of the 2004 and 2005 International Bluegrass Music Association Male Vocalist of the Year Award. 2005, won IBMA for Album of the Year and Recorded Event of the Year for his album "40," celebrating his 40th year(2003) in bluegrass music. He was inducted into the International Bluegrass Music Hall of Fame in 2015.

== Biography ==
Sparks was born and raised in Lebanon, Ohio. His family originated from Jackson County, Kentucky in the Appalachians. In his childhood, he used to listen to the Grand Ole Opry and to radio station WCKY. He learned to play the guitar when he was quite young influenced by artists such as Wayne Raney, Stanley Brothers, Tommy Sutton and Paul "Moon" Mullins. Although he had played in country music and rock bands while he was in high school, his bluegrass career began when he joined the Stanley Brothers in 1964. At that time he was playing in a local band in Middletown, Ohio: "Irvin MackIntosh and His Band" and a friend of his, banjo player Wilbur Hall, was acquainted with Moon Mullins - who had just arrived to Middletown - and Hall told Mullins about Sparks. Mullins, who knew the Stanley Brothers, recommended Sparks to them and he was hired after an audition. An extensive tour followed and he recorded for the first time in 1965 for a small label in Dayton, Ohio.

In December 1966, Carter Stanley of the Stanley Brothers died and Ralph Stanley was in need of a guitarist to replace Carter. "Ralph Stanley and His Clinch Mountain Boys" consisted of Ralph Stanley-banjo, Larry Sparks-guitar, Curly Ray Cline-fiddle and Melvin Goins-bass. Sparks moved to Clintwood, Virginia and got married. With Ralph Stanley, Larry Sparks recorded the original versions of modern bluegrass standards including "I Only Exist", "Sharecropper's Son", and "Going Up Home To Live in Green Pastures". In late 1969, he left the "Clinch Mountain Boys", formed the "Lonesome Ramblers" and began recording for Pine Tree Records. The first version of the "Ramblers" comprised Larry Sparks, David Cox, Lloyd Hensley, Joe Isaacs and Larry's sister Bernice Sparks. After Pine Tree Records he went to Old Homestead Records and then to Starday Records before moving to the bluegrass label Rebel Records in 1977. Over the years, his band has undergone numerous personnel changes. Banjo player and tenor singer Dave Evans has been one of the "Ramblers" most well-known members.

In 2005 Sparks performed at the Gettysburg Bluegrass Festival with the Lonesome Ramblers.

== Selected discography ==
Year	Album	US Bluegrass	Label
1970	Ramblin' Guitar		Pine Tree
1971	New Gospel Songs		Pine Tree
1972	Bluegrass Old and New		Old Homestead
1972	Ramblin' Bluegrass		Starday
1974	Where the Sweet Waters Flow		Old Homestead
1977	Sings Hank Williams		County
1980	It's Never Too Late		June Appal
1980	John Deere Tractor		Rebel
1981	Dark Hollow		Rebel
1982	The Best of		Rebel
1982	The Testing Times		Rebel
1983	Blue Sparks		Rebel
1984	Lonesome Guitar		Rebel
1986	Gonna Be Movin'		Rebel
1988	Silver Reflections		Rebel
1989	Classic Bluegrass		Rebel
1992	Travelin'		Rebel
1994	The Rock I Stand On		Rebel
1996	Blue Mountain Memories		Rebel
2000	Special Delivery		Rebel
2003	The Coldest Part of Winter		Rebel
2005	40	10	Rebel
2007	The Last Suit You Wear	4	McCoury
2008	Kentucky Banjo		Gusto
2008	I Don't Regret a Mile		Sparks
2009	I Just Want to Thank You Lord		Rural Rhythm
2011	Almost Home	1	Rounder
2014	Lonesome and Then Some: A Classic 50th celebration		Rebel
2019	New Moon Over My Shoulder		Rebel
2021	Ministry in Song		Rebel
