= International Bluegrass Music Association =

Trade association for bluegrass music

- Type: Music association
- Industry: Bluegrass music
- Founded: 1985
- Headquarters: Owensboro, Kentucky (1985-2003), Nashville, Tennessee (2003-present), US
- Website: ibma.org

The International Bluegrass Music Association, or IBMA, is a trade association to promote bluegrass music.

Formed in 1985, IBMA established its first headquarters in Owensboro, Kentucky. In 1988 they announced plans to create the International Bluegrass Music Museum as a joint venture with RiverPark Center in Owensboro. In 1987 IBMA established the World of Bluegrass, a combination trade show, concert, and awards presentation. This was originally set in Owensboro, before moving to Louisville, Kentucky in 1997. Nashville, Tennessee hosted this event from 2005 through 2012. From 2013 to 2024, the event was hosted in Raleigh, North Carolina but was moved to Chattanooga, Tennessee for 2025 through 2027. In 1991 IBMA established the International Bluegrass Music Hall of Honor at the International Bluegrass Music Museum to recognize lifetime contributions to bluegrass, both by performers and non-performers. In 2003 IBMA relocated its offices to Nashville, Tennessee. Winners are chosen by the 2,500 members of the International Bluegrass Music Association.

== Mission Statement ==
The IBMA is the non-profit music association that connects, educates, and empowers bluegrass professionals and enthusiasts, honoring tradition and encouraging innovation in the bluegrass community worldwide.

== Hall of Fame ==
Hall of Fame Inductees

- Norman Blake - 2022
- Paul "Moon" Mullins - 2022
- Peter Rowan - 2022
- Alison Krauss - 2021
- Lynn Morris - 2021
- The Stoneman Family - 2021
- J.T. Gray - 2020
- The Johnson Mountain Boys - 2020
- New Grass Revival - 2020
- The Kentucky Colonels - 2019
- Bill Emerson - 2019
- Mike Auldridge - 2019
- Vassar Clements - 2018
- Tom T. and Dixie Hall - 2018
- Mike Seeger - 2018
- Allen Shelton - 2018
- Ricky Skaggs - 2018
- Jake Tullock - 2018
- Joe Val - 2018
- Paul Williams - 2018
- Terry Woodward - 2018
- Bobby Hicks - 2017
- Alice Gerrard and Hazel Dickens - 2017
- Roland White - 2017
- Clarence White - 2016
- The Rounder founders - 2016
- Larry Sparks - 2015
- Bill Keith - 2015
- The Original Seldom Scene - 2014
- Neil Rosenberg - 2014
- Tony Rice - 2013
- Paul Warren - 2013
- Doyle Lawson - 2012
- Ralph Rinzler - 2012
- Del McCoury - 2011
- George Shuffler - 2011
- John Hartford - 2010
- Louise Scruggs - 2010
- The Dillards - 2009
- Lonesome Pine Fiddlers - 2009
- Bill Clifton - 2008
- Charles K. Wolfe - 2008
- Carl Story - 2007
- Howard Staton “Cedric Rainwater” Watts - 2007
- The Lewis Family - 2006
- Syd Nathan - 2006
- Red Allen - 2005
- Benny Martin - 2005
- Curly Seckler - 2004
- Bill Vernon - 2004
- J. D. Crowe - 2003
- David Freeman - 2002
- The Lilly Brothers & Don Stover - 2002
- The Carter Family - 2001
- Arthel "Doc" Watson - 2000
- Lance LeRoy - 2000
- Kenny Baker - 1999
- Chubby Wise - 1998
- Carlton Haney - 1998
- Josh Graves - 1997
- The Country Gentlemen - 1996
- Pete Kuykendall - 1996
- Jimmy Martin - 1995
- The Osborne Brothers - 1994
- Mac Wiseman - 1993
- Jim & Jesse McReynolds - 1993
- Don Reno & Arthur Lee "Red" Smiley - 1992
- The Stanley Brothers, Carter & Ralph - 1992
- Bill Monroe - 1991
- Earl Scruggs - 1991
- Lester Flatt - 1991

== Entertainer of the year ==
- 1990: Hot Rize
- 1991: Alison Krauss & Union Station
- 1992: Nashville Bluegrass Band
- 1993: Nashville Bluegrass Band
- 1994: Del McCoury Band
- 1995: Alison Krauss & Union Station
- 1996: Del McCoury Band
- 1997: Del McCoury Band
- 1998: Del McCoury Band
- 1999: Del McCoury Band
- 2000: Del McCoury Band
- 2001: Rhonda Vincent & the Rage
- 2002: Del McCoury Band
- 2003: Del McCoury Band
- 2004: Del McCoury Band
- 2005: Cherryholmes
- 2006: The Grascals
- 2007: The Grascals
- 2008: Dailey & Vincent
- 2009: Dailey & Vincent
- 2010: Dailey & Vincent
- 2011: Steve Martin and the Steep Canyon Rangers
- 2012: The Gibson Brothers
- 2013: The Gibson Brothers
- 2014: Balsam Range
- 2015: The Earls of Leicester
- 2016: The Earls of Leicester
- 2017: The Earls of Leicester
- 2018: Balsam Range
- 2019: Joe Mullins & The Radio Ramblers
- 2020: Sister Sadie
- 2021: Billy Strings
