= List of IIIrd Tyme Out band members =

Russell Moore and IIIrd Tyme Out, previously known as simply IIIrd Tyme Out, is an American bluegrass band from Cumming, Georgia. Formed in May 1991, the group originally consisted of guitarist and vocalist Russell Moore, fiddle player Mike Hartgrove, mandolin player Alan Bibey, banjo player Terry Baucom, and bassist Ray Deaton. Moore remains the sole constant member of the group, which currently also features Wayne Benson on mandolin (from 1992 to 2004, and since 2007), Keith McKinnon on banjo (since 2013), Nathan Aldridge on fiddle (since 2018), and Colton Baker on bass (since 2023).

== History ==
After leaving Doyle Lawson's band Quicksilver, guitarist Russell Moore, fiddle player Mike Hartgrove and bassist Ray Deaton formed IIIrd Tyme Out (3TO) in May 1991. They completed the initial incarnation by adding mandolin player Alan Bibey and banjo player Terry Baucom, both of whom left Lawson spin-off group The New Quicksilver to join the new band. The original lineup released two albums — 1991's IIIrd Tyme Out and 1992's Puttin' New Roots Down — before Bibey quit suddenly a few days before a show in June 1992; he was replaced by Lou Reid, who disbanded his own eponymous group to become a full band member of 3TO the next month. Reid and Baucom left to form Carolina that November, with Wayne Benson and Barry Abernathy, respectively, taking their places before the end of the year. Both new members contributed to 3TO's third album, Grandpa's Mandolin, before Abernathy was replaced by former Lonesome River Band member Steve Dilling in July 1993.

The lineup of Moore, Hartgrove, Benson, Dilling and Deaton remained stable for several years, producing four studio albums and two live releases. Towards the end of 2001, Hartgrove left 3TO to join the Lonesome River Band. He was replaced during the recording of the band's 2002 gospel album Singing on Streets of Gold by Greg Luck, who was engineering the record at his studio. Benson left in the spring of 2004, shortly after the recording of The Best Durn Ride, to join John Cowan's band, with Alan Perdue taking his place in 3TO. Luck left early the following year, replaced by Justen Haynes in March. The new lineup released the live album Round III at the MAC in 2006. This would prove to be the final release to feature Ray Deaton, who became the last founding member of 3TO to leave the band in July 2007, when he joined The Anita Fisher Band and was replaced by Edgar Loudermilk. It was also the only album to feature Perdue, who was replaced by the returning Wayne Benson in May 2007.

Starting with the band's 2009 release of the same name, 3TO changed its name to "Russell Moore & IIIrd Tyme Out". This album was followed by Prime Tyme and Bluegrassed: Timeless Hits from the Past, before both Dilling and Loudermilk left the group in November 2013 — the former due to health issues, and the latter to pursue other projects. The following month, the remaining members announced the addition of new banjo player Keith McKinnon and new bassist Blake Johnson. The new members debuted on It's About Tyme in 2015, although Johnson was forced to leave that September due to ongoing medical issues, with Jerry Cole — who had substituted for the bassist at several recent show — taking his place. After a few more years of touring, Justen Haynes left 3TO in January 2018 to focus on other business ventures. He was replaced the next month by Nathan Aldridge. In December that year, Cole left for Doyle Lawson's Quicksilver, with Dustin Pyrtle taking his place in 3TO.

In May 2021, Kevin McKinnon (brother of banjo player Keith) took over from Pyrtle on bass. The new lineup released the band's first material in eight years with the singles "Heading East to West Virginia" and "When I Get There" in 2023, which was followed in 2024 by "Bluegrass". Prior to the release of all three singles, however, McKinnon was replaced on bass by Colton Baker in June 2023.

== Members ==
=== Current ===
Name	Years active	Instruments	Release contributions
Russell Moore	1991–present	lead vocals; guitar	all Russell Moore and IIIrd Tyme Out (3TO) releases
Wayne Benson	1992–2004; 2007–present	mandolin; mandola; backing vocals	all 3TO releases from Grandpa's Mandolin (1993) onwards, except Round III at the MAC (2006)
Keith McKinnon	2013–present	banjo; backing vocals	It's About Tyme (2015); "Heading East to West Virginia" (2023); "When I Get There" (2023); "Bluegrass" (2024)
Nathan Aldridge	2018–present	fiddle; backing vocals	"Heading East to West Virginia" (2023); "When I Get There" (2023); "Bluegrass" (2024)
Colton Baker	2023–present	bass; backing vocals	none as yet

=== Former ===
Name	Years active	Instruments	Release contributions
Ray Deaton	1991–2007 (died 2019)	bass; backing vocals	all 3TO releases from IIIrd Tyme Out (1991) to Round III at the MAC (2006)
Mike Hartgrove	1991–2001	fiddle; backing vocals	all 3TO releases from IIIrd Tyme Out (1991) to Back to the MAC (2001)
Terry Baucom	1991–1992 (died 2023)	banjo; backing vocals	IIIrd Tyme Out (1991); Puttin' New Roots Down (1992)
Alan Bibey	1991–1992	mandolin; backing vocals	IIIrd Tyme Out (1991); Puttin' New Roots Down (1992)
Lou Reid	1992	mandolin; backing vocals	none
Barry Abernathy	1992–1993	banjo; backing vocals	Grandpa's Mandolin (1993)
Steve Dilling	1993–2013	banjo; guitar; backing vocals	all 3TO releases from Across the Miles (1994) to Bluegrassed: Timeless Hits from the Past (2013)
Greg Luck	2002–2005	fiddle; backing vocals	Singing on Streets of Gold (2002); The Best Durn Ride (2004)
Alan Perdue	2004–2007 (died 2019)	mandolin; mandola; backing vocals	Round III at the MAC (2006); Footprints: A IIIrd Tyme Out Collection (2007) – two new recordings
Justen Haynes	2005–2018	fiddle; backing vocals	all 3TO releases from Round III at the MAC (2006) to It's About Tyme (2015)
Edgar Loudermilk	2007–2013	bass; backing vocals	Russell Moore and IIIrd Tyme Out (2009); Prime Tyme (2011); Bluegrassed: Timeless Hits from the Past (2013)
Blake Johnson	2013–2015	bass; backing vocals	It's About Tyme (2015)
Jerry Cole	2015–2018	bass; backing vocals	none
Dustin Pyrtle	2018–2021	bass; backing vocals	none
Kevin McKinnon	2021–2023	bass; backing vocals	"Heading East to West Virginia" (2023); "When I Get There" (2023); "Bluegrass" (2024)

== Lineups ==
Lineups as IIIrd Tyme Out

Period	Members	Releases
May 1991–June 1992	Russell Moore — lead vocals, guitar; Mike Hartgrove — fiddle, backing vocals; Alan Bibey — mandolin, backing vocals; Terry Baucom — banjo, backing vocals; Ray Deaton — bass, backing vocals	IIIrd Tyme Out (1991); Puttin' New Roots Down (1992)
June–November 1992	Russell Moore — lead vocals, guitar; Mike Hartgrove — fiddle, backing vocals; Lou Reid — mandolin, backing vocals; Terry Baucom — banjo, backing vocals; Ray Deaton — bass, backing vocals	none
December 1992–July 1993	Russell Moore — lead vocals, guitar; Mike Hartgrove — fiddle, backing vocals; Wayne Benson — mandolin, backing vocals; Barry Abernathy — banjo, backing vocals; Ray Deaton — bass, backing vocals	Grandpa's Mandolin (1993)
July 1993–late 2001	Russell Moore — lead vocals, guitar; Mike Hartgrove — fiddle, backing vocals; Wayne Benson — mandolin, backing vocals; Steve Dilling — banjo, guitar, backing vocals; Ray Deaton — bass, backing vocals	Across the Miles (1994); Letter to Home (1995); Living on the Other Side (1996); Live at the MAC (1998); John & Mary (1999); Back to the MAC (2001)
Early 2002–spring 2004	Russell Moore — lead vocals, guitar; Greg Luck — fiddle, backing vocals; Wayne Benson — mandolin, backing vocals; Steve Dilling — banjo, guitar, backing vocals; Ray Deaton — bass, backing vocals	Singing on Streets of Gold (2002); The Best Durn Ride (2004)
Spring 2004–March 2005	Russell Moore — lead vocals, guitar; Greg Luck — fiddle, backing vocals; Alan Perdue — mandolin, backing vocals; Steve Dilling — banjo, guitar, backing vocals; Ray Deaton — bass, backing vocals	none
March 2005–May 2007	Russell Moore — lead vocals, guitar; Justen Haynes — fiddle, backing vocals; Alan Perdue — mandolin, backing vocals; Steve Dilling — banjo, guitar, backing vocals; Ray Deaton — bass, backing vocals	Round III at the MAC (2006); Footprints (2007) — two new recordings
May–July 2007	Russell Moore — lead vocals, guitar; Justen Haynes — fiddle, backing vocals; Wayne Benson — mandolin, backing vocals; Steve Dilling — banjo, guitar, backing vocals; Ray Deaton — bass, backing vocals	none

Lineups as Russell Moore & IIIrd Tyme Out

Period	Members	Releases
July 2007–November 2013	Russell Moore — lead vocals, guitar; Justen Haynes — fiddle, backing vocals; Wayne Benson — mandolin, backing vocals; Steve Dilling — banjo, guitar, backing vocals; Edgar Loudermilk — bass, backing vocals	Russell Moore & IIIrd Tyme Out (2009); Prime Tyme (2011); Bluegrassed: Timeless Hits from the Past (2013)
December 2013–September 2015	Russell Moore — lead vocals, guitar; Justen Haynes — fiddle, backing vocals; Wayne Benson — mandolin, backing vocals; Keith McKinnon — banjo, backing vocals; Blake Johnson — bass, backing vocals	It's About Tyme (2015)
September 2015–January 2018	Russell Moore — lead vocals, guitar; Justen Haynes — fiddle, backing vocals; Wayne Benson — mandolin, backing vocals; Keith McKinnon — banjo, backing vocals; Jerry Cole — bass, backing vocals	none
February–December 2018	Russell Moore — lead vocals, guitar; Nathan Aldridge — fiddle, backing vocals; Wayne Benson — mandolin, backing vocals; Keith McKinnon — banjo, backing vocals; Jerry Cole — bass, backing vocals	none
December 2018–May 2021	Russell Moore — lead vocals, guitar; Nathan Aldridge — fiddle, backing vocals; Wayne Benson — mandolin, backing vocals; Keith McKinnon — banjo, backing vocals; Dustin Pyrtle — bass, backing vocals	none
May 2021–June 2023	Russell Moore — lead vocals, guitar; Nathan Aldridge — fiddle, backing vocals; Wayne Benson — mandolin, backing vocals; Keith McKinnon — banjo, backing vocals; Kevin McKinnon — bass, backing vocals	"Heading East to West Virginia" (2023); "When I Get There" (2023); "Bluegrass" (2024)
June 2023–present	Russell Moore — lead vocals, guitar; Nathan Aldridge — fiddle, backing vocals; Wayne Benson — mandolin, backing vocals; Keith McKinnon — banjo, backing vocals; Colton Baker — bass, backing vocals	none as yet
