= Blue Is the Colour of Hope =

Studio album by Maura O'Connell
- Released: 1992
- Label: Warner Bros.
- Producer: Jerry Douglas

Maura O'Connell chronology
A Real Life Story (1991)	Blue Is the Colour of Hope (1992)	Stories (1995)

Blue Is the Colour of Hope is an album by the Irish musician Maura O'Connell, released in 1992. She supported the album with a North American tour that included shows with Loudon Wainwright III. The album title comes from a line by J. D. Salinger.

== Production ==
The album was produced by Jerry Douglas, who also played dobro and lap steel. O'Connell considered herself a folk singer, regardless of the instrumentation on a track. Most of the songs are ballads; O'Connell picked songs she liked without worrying about stylistic or thematic flow. "It Don't Bring You" is a cover of the Mary Chapin Carpenter song. "Bad News (At the Best of Times)" was written by Paul Carrack and John Wesley Harding. "I Would Be Stronger Than That" is about domestic abuse. Jennifer Kimball cowrote "The Blue Train". Rosanne Cash, Webb Wilder, and Alison Krauss were among the backing vocalists on Blue Is the Colour of Hope.

== Critical reception ==
Professional ratings
Review scores
Source	Rating
AllMusic	3/5 stars
Chicago Tribune	3.5/4 stars
The Indianapolis Star	3.5/4 stars
MusicHound Rock: The Essential Album Guide	4/5 stars
The Republican	3.5/5 stars
The Virginian-Pilot	3.5/5 stars

The Washington Post called the album "an almost unbroken series of meditations on love and longing." The Chicago Tribune stated that it "combines an easy, bluesy groove with polished production." The Indianapolis Star determined that "the songs are unremittingly sad but beautiful through O'Connell's voice and sparse arrangements featuring the cream of Nashville's session players."

The Los Angeles Times concluded that "O'Connell's sturdy, dignified delivery allows her to probe the hurt unstintingly and hit thrilling emotive peaks without ever sounding overwrought." Rolling Stone opined that "the subtle refinements in her full-bodied vocals make her seem like cabernet in a shot-and-beer world." The Advocate stated that O'Connell "ranks among the finer song stylists of her generation."

AllMusic wrote that "this charmingly eclectic album may be O'Connell's best."

== Track listing ==
No.	Title	Length
1.	"Still Hurts Sometimes"
2.	"The Blue Train"
3.	"To Be the One"
4.	"It Don't Bring You"
5.	"I Would Be Stronger Than That"
6.	"So Soft Your Goodbye"
7.	"Love to Learn"
8.	"First You Cry"
9.	"Bad News (At the Best of Times)"
10.	"Sunnyshine Day"

== Personnel ==
- Guitar: Russ Barenberg, Zane Baxter, Mark Casstevens, Jerry Douglas, Kenny Greenberg, Arty McGlynn. Mandolin: Sam Bush
- Bass: David Francis, Edgar Meyer, Michael Rhodes
- Piano: John Barlow Jarvis
- Accordion: Joey Miskulin
- Strings: Stuart Duncan, Edgar Meyer
- Drums: Kenny Malone
- Percussion: Tom Roady
- Backing Vocals: Mary-Chapin Carpenter, Rosanne Cash, David Francis, Alison Krauss, Webb Wilder
