= Everything Is Gonna Work Out Fine =

Compilation album by Jerry Douglas
- Released: 1987
- Genre: Progressive bluegrass, country
- Label: Rounder

Jerry Douglas chronology
Changing Channels (1987)	Everything Is Gonna Work Out Fine (1987)	Plant Early (1989)

Professional ratings
Review scores
Source	Rating
Allmusic	4/5 stars

Everything Is Gonna Work Out Fine is an album by dobro player Jerry Douglas, released in 1987. It contains all the tracks from his two releases on the Rounder label — Fluxology and Fluxedo — except for "Say a Little Prayer for You".

== Track listing ==
1. "Fluxology" (Jerry Douglas) – 3:06
2. "Randy Lynn Rag" (Earl Scruggs) – 2:19
3. "Bill Cheatham" (Traditional) – 3:03
4. "C-Biscuit" (Douglas) – 3:30
5. "Wheel Hoss" (Bill Monroe) – 2:24
6. "Alabam" – 2:53
7. "Dixie Hoedown" (Jimmy Lunsford, Don Reno) – 1:53
8. "Red Bud Rag" (Douglas) – 2:59
9. "Blues for Vickie" (Douglas) – 1:02
10. "Nite Crawler" (Douglas) – 3:26
11. "Tennessee Fluxedo" (Douglas) – 4:51
12. "Sunny Skies" (James Taylor) – 3:01
13. "Intro" – 4:03
14. "Tell Her Lies (and Feed Her Candy)" (Joe McCracken) – 2:13
15. "Birth of the Blues" (Lew Brown, Buddy DeSylva, Ray Henderson) – 3:35
16. "Cincinnati Rag" (David Franklin) – 2:28
17. "Panhandle Rag" (Leon McAuliffe) – 4:54
18. "Ben Dewberry's Final Run" (Andrew Jenkins) – 3:44
19. "I Think It's Gonna Work Out Fine" (Robert Lee McCoy, Sylvia McKinney) – 4:15

== Personnel ==
- Darol Anger – fiddle
- Russ Barenberg – guitar
- Terry Baucom – fiddle
- Steve "Hood" Bryant – bass
- Sam Bush – mandolin, fiddle, slide mandolin
- Jerry Douglas – resonator guitar, vocals
- Béla Fleck – banjo
- Phil Gazell – harmonica
- Wes Golding – guitar
- Jack Hicks – banjo
- David Parmley – guitar
- Todd Phillips – bass
- Tony Rice – guitar
- Mark Schatz – bass
- Ricky Skaggs – mandolin, fiddle, guitar
- Bobby Slone – bass
- Cheryl Warren – bass
- Buck White – piano, mandolin
- Sharon White – guitar
