= Transatlantic Sessions =

Series of musical productions by Glasgow-based Pelicula Films Ltd

Transatlantic Sessions musical co-directors Aly Bain and Jerry Douglas

Transatlantic Sessions is the collective title for a series of musical productions by Glasgow-based Pelicula Films Ltd, funded by- and produced for BBC Scotland, BBC Four and RTÉ of Ireland. The productions comprise collaborative live performances by various leading traditional, folk, bluegrass and country musicians from both sides of the North Atlantic, playing music from Scotland, Ireland, England and North America, who congregate under the musical direction of Aly Bain and Jerry Douglas to record and film a set of half-hour TV episodes. The television director is Mike Alexander and the producer is Douglas Eadie.

Following the end of the TV series there has been an annual touring version, with similar format, starting at the Celtic Connections festival in Glasgow, then visiting venues in Scotland and England. These received critical acclaim in the press.

The six series have been released in both CD and DVD format by Whirlie Records.

== Background ==
The first (Original) Transatlantic Sessions episode was produced in 1995 - a project conceived at that time by Douglas Eadie, Mike Alexander and Aly Bain. Subsequent sessions were produced in 1998, 2007, 2009, 2011 and 2013. To date, the series comprises the six sessions shown below in the History (listed in chronological order).

The producer and directors select a special setting for each session – typically a country manor, lodge or hotel in Scotland where the musicians perform and stay while the session is recorded (see also below). Each session was filmed in a different location with the exception of Series 4 and 5, which were filmed in the same house (the hunting lodge at Glen Lyon near Aberfeldy, Perthshire). Series 6 was filmed and recorded at a location on the banks of Loch Lomond.

== History ==
Participating musicians vary from session to session but, since the first session, a format has been followed where a core of musicians forms the House Band and each session features additional guest artists.

=== The Original Transatlantic Sessions (TS1) ===
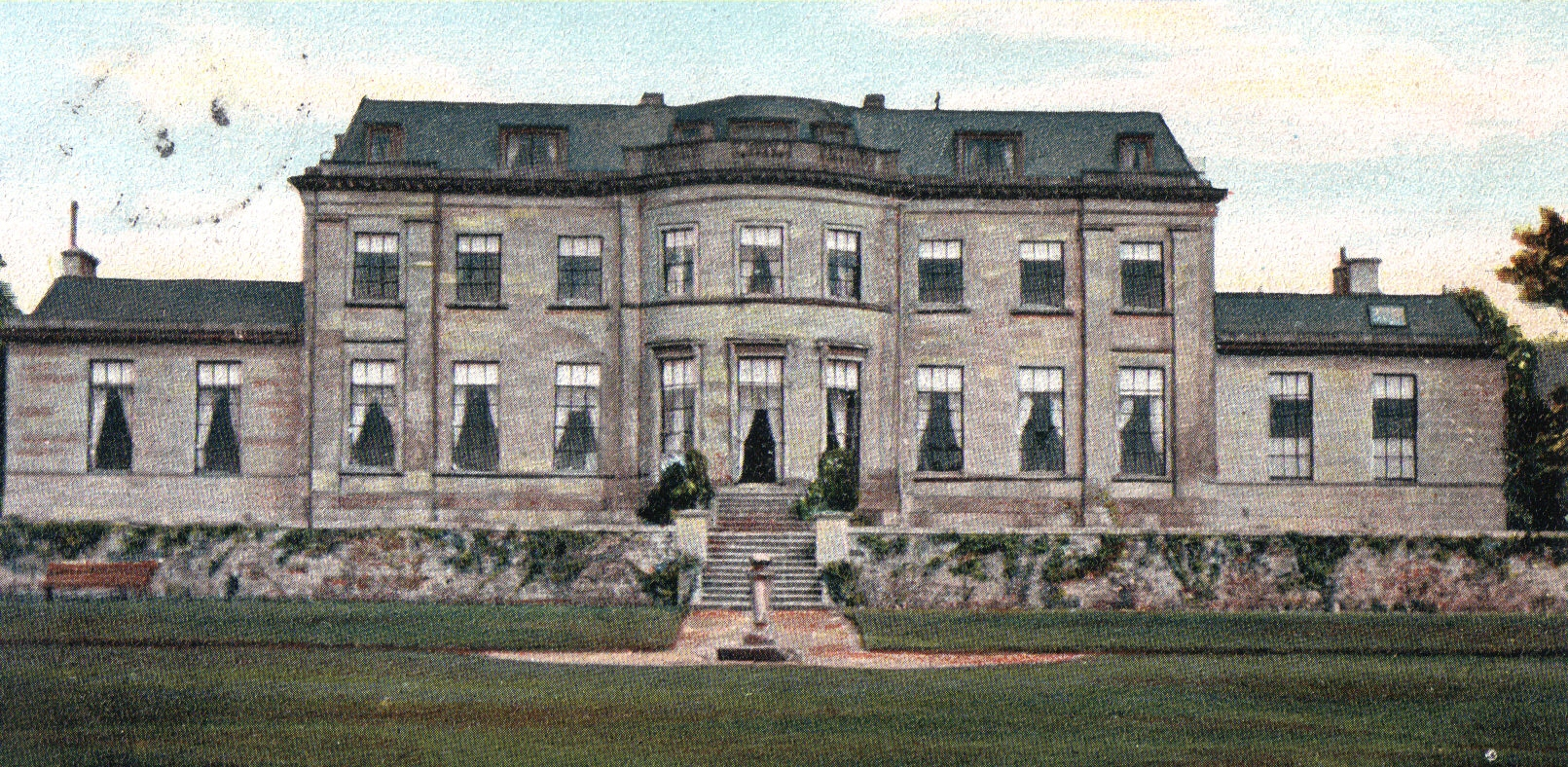
Montgreenan House, where The Original Transatlantic Sessions production was recorded in 1995

(1995 / directed by Aly Bain and Jay Ungar). Recorded at Montgreenan Mansion House Hotel in Ayrshire.

- House Band: Aly Bain, Jay Ungar, Russ Barenberg, Jerry Douglas, Molly Mason, Danny Thompson and Jim Sutherland.
- Featuring: Martyn Bennett, Mary Black, Guy Clark, Travis Clark, Phil Cunningham, Iris DeMent, Dick Gaughan, Emmylou Harris, Donal Lunny, Cathal McConnell, John Martyn, Kate & Anna McGarrigle, Charlie McKerron, Dougie MacLean, Karen Matheson, Kathy Mattea, Mairéad Ní Mhaonaigh, Mark O'Connor, Rod Paterson, Donald Shaw, Declan Sinnott, Davy Spillane, Savourna Stevenson, Simon Thoumire, Rufus Wainwright and Michelle Wright.

==== TS1 Programmes ====
Main performers in brackets (not necessarily the composers).

- Programme One: Wheels of Love (Emmylou Harris, Iris DeMent, Mary Black), MacIlmoyle (Aly Bain, Jay Ungar, Russ Barenberg, Molly Mason, Jim Sutherland), Ready for the Storm (Kathy Mattea, Dougie MacLean), Spencer the Rover (John Martyn, Danny Thompson), Big Bug Shuffle (Russ Barenberg), Black Diamond Strings (Guy Clark, Emmylou Harris), Guitar Talk (Michelle Wright, Karen Matheson), Ashokan Farewell (Jay Ungar, Aly Bain)
- Programme Two: May You Never (John Martyn, Kathy Mattea), Big Scioty (Jay Ungar, Aly Bain, Molly Mason, Russ Barenberg, Jerry Douglas), Ta Mo Chleamhnas Deanta, (Mairéad Ní Mhaonaigh, Donal Lunny), Grey Eagle (Mark O'Connor), Talk to Me of Mendocino (Kate & Anna McGarrigle, Karen Matheson), Mexican Monterey (Savourna Stevenson, Aly Bain, Danny Thompson), By The Time It Gets Dark (Mary Black, Emmylou Harris, Declan Sinnot), Auld Lang Syne (Rod Paterson, Mairéad Ní Mhaonaigh, Martyn Bennett)
- Programme Three: The Loving Time (Mary Black, Emmylou Harris, Declan Sinnott), Goodbye Liza Jane (Jay Ungar, Aly Bain, Russ Barenberg, Jerry Douglas, Molly Mason), Iain Ghlinn Cuaich (Karen Matheson, Donald Shaw), Turning Away (Dougie MacLean, Kathy Mattea), Boulavogue / Mrs McCleod (Davy Spillane, Aly Bain, Russ Barenberg), Let the Mystery Be (Iris DeMent), Wild Mountain Thyme (Dick Gaughan, Emmylou Harris, Kate & Anna McGarrigle, Rufus Wainwright), Far From Home / Big John MacNeil (House Band, Mark O'Connor, Martyn Bennett, Charlie McKerron, Mairéad Ní Mhaonaigh, Cathal McConnell)
- Programme Four: Goin' Back to Harlan (Anna & Kate McGarrigle, Emmylou Harris), Daire's Dream (Davy Spillane, Jerry Douglas, Russ Barenberg), Canan Nan Gaidheal (Karen Matheson, Donald Shaw), Jim's Jig / Little Cascades / Fox in the Town (Simon Thoumire, Jim Sutherland), Farewell, Farewell (Mary Black, Declan Sinnott), Cat in the Bag (Mark O'Connor, Russ Barenberg, Donal Lunny, Danny Thompson), Our Town (Iris DeMent), Ronfleuse Gobeil (Jay Ungar, Aly Bain, Molly Mason, Russ Barenberg, Jim Sutherland)
- Programme Five: I Will (Kathy Mattea, Dougie MacLean), Will the Circle be Unbroken (Michelle Wright, Iris DeMent, Mairéad Ní Mhaonaigh), You Low Down Dirty Dog (Jay Ungar, Aly Bain, Russ Barenberg, Jerry Douglas, Molly Mason), Gentle Annie (Kate & Anna McGarrigle, Rod Paterson), Jesse Polka (Mark O'Connor, Phil Cunningham, Russ Barenberg, Donal Lunny, Danny Thompson), Green Rolling Hills (Emmylou Harris, Mary Black), The Dark Woman of the Glen (Cathal McConnell, Aly Bain, Phil Cunningham, Russ Barenberg), Big Muff (John Martyn, Danny Thompson)
- Programme Six: Hard Times (Kate & Anna McGarrigle, Rufus Wainwright, Emmylou Harris, Mary Black, Karen Matheson, Rod Paterson), MacCrimmon's Lament (Martyn Bennett), Dublin Blues (Guy Clark, Karen Matheson), Sweet is the Melody (Iris DeMent), A Maiden's Prayer (Aly Bain, Jay Ungar, Molly Mason, Russ Barenberg, Jerry Douglas, Jim Sutherland), Don't Want to Know (John Martyn, Danny Thompson), For No One (Emmylou Harris, Dave Spillane), Scotland (House Band, Mark O'Connor, Martyn Bennett, Charlie McKerron, Mairéad Ní Mhaonaigh, Cathal McConnell)
- Programme Seven: Old Fashioned Waltz (Emmylou Harris, Kate & Anna McGarrigle), Clyde to Sandyhook (Savourna Stevenson, Aly Bain), Dark as a Dungeon (Guy Clark, Rod Paterson), The Lover's Waltz (Molly Mason, Jay Ungar, Aly Bain), Both Sides the Tweed (Dick Gaughan, Emmylou Harris), The Reasons Why I'm Gone (Michelle Wright, Karen Matheson), Uncle Sam / Rain on Olivia Town (Jerry Douglas), This Love Will Carry (Dougie MacLean, Kathy Mattea)

=== Transatlantic Sessions 2 ===
(1998 / directed by Aly Bain and Jerry Douglas). Recorded at Raemoir House Hotel, Banchory, Aberdeenshire.

- House Band: Aly Bain, Jerry Douglas, Russ Barenberg, Michael Doucet, Breda Smyth, Danny Thompson and Tommy Hayes.
- Featuring: Paul Brady, Ronan Browne, Rosanne Cash, Radney Foster, James Grant, Nanci Griffith, Boo Hewerdine, Fiona Kennedy, John Leventhal, Ishbel MacAskill, Iain MacDonald, John Martyn, Karen Matheson, Maura O'Connell, Eddi Reader, Sharon Shannon, Donald Shaw, Ricky Skaggs and Sharon White.

==== TS2 Programmes ====
Main performers in brackets (not necessarily the composers).

- Programme One: The Blue Train (Maura O'Connell, James Grant, Nanci Griffith), A Simple Life/traditional reel (Ricky Skaggs), Piobaireachid Dhomhnaill Dhuibh (Ishbel Macaskill, Iain MacDonald), He Got All the Whiskey (John Martyn, Eddi Reader), Magic Foot (Sharon Shannon, Russ Barenberg), Boots of Spanish Leather (Nanci Griffith), Eunice Two-Step (Michael Doucet, Sharon Shannon)
- Programme Two: Waiting for the Federals (Aly Bain), Who Knows Where the Time Goes (Nanci Griffith, Karen Matheson, James Grant, Maura O'Connell), Violet Tulloch - Queen of Lerwick (Aly Bain, Jerry Douglas, Russ Barenberg, Donald Shaw), The World is What You Make It (Paul Brady, Karen Matheson, Fiona Kennedy), Evangeline (James Grant, Karen Matheson, Maura O'Connell), Jolie Blonde (Michael Doucet), Talk About Suffering/traditional reel (Ricky Skaggs)
- Programme Three: Trouble in the Fields (Maura O'Connell, Nanci Griffith), Bachelor's Walk/The Congress (Breda Smyth), Footsteps Fall (Eddi Reader, Boo Hewerdine), Bonaparte's Retreat (Aly Bain), Seven Year Ache (Rosanne Cash, Radney Foster), Excuse Me Mister (John Martyn), There's Always Sunday (Karen Matheson, James Grant, Maura O'Connell)
- Programme Four: Hummingbird (Eddi Reader, Boo Hewerdine), Road to Aberdeen (Nanci Griffith), Urban Air (Ronan Browne), Storms Are on the Ocean (Sharon White, Ricky Skaggs), La Danse de la Vie (Michael Doucet, Sharon Shannon), Ae Fond Kiss (Karen Matheson, Paul Brady), God Knows When (Radney Foster)
- Programme Five: Nach Truach Leat Mi Stun Eirinn (Fiona Kennedy, Karen Matheson), Western Lift / Glass of Beer (Sharon Shannon), Cure for Life (James Grant, Karen Matheson), Marriage Made in Hollywood (Paul Brady, Karen Matheson), A Tribute to Paeder O'Donnell / Takarasaka (Jerry Douglas), God Speed (Radney Foster)
- Programme Six: Forty Shades of Green (Rosanne Cash, Paul Brady), Passing the Bar (Jerry Douglas), My Father's Son (Ricky Skaggs), Les Veuves de la Coulee (Russ Barenberg, Aly Bain), Arthur McBride and the Sergeant (Paul Brady), Always Will (Nanci Griffith, Ricky Skaggs, Sharon White), Nobody Wins (Radney Foster)
- Programme Seven: Return to the Brandywine (Russ Barenberg, Aly Bain), September When it Comes (Rosanne Cash, John Leventhal), Sanseptique Set: Domhnall Dubh An Domhnallaich / Thoir A Nall Ailean Thugam / Senseptique (Tommy Hayes, Fiona Kennedy, Karen Matheson), Down by the Sally Gardens (Maura O'Connell, Karen Matheson), The Mansion on the Hill (Sharon White, Ricky Skaggs), Solid Air (John Martyn, Danny Thompson), Puirt A Beul set: O Mhisgh A'Chuir A Nollaig Oirnn / Cape Breton Port A Beul / Ann MacKeachnie's Favoutire / Bealach A'Chara (Iain MacDonald)

=== Transatlantic Sessions 3 ===
(2007 / directed by Jerry Douglas and Aly Bain). Recorded at Strathgarry House in Perthshire.

- House Band: Aly Bain, Jerry Douglas, Russ Barenberg, Phil Cunningham, Dónal Lunny, Donald Shaw, Todd Parks, Michael McGoldrick, Ronan Browne, James Mackintosh and Donald Hay.
- Featuring: Paul Brady, Iris DeMent, Cara Dillon, Julie Fowlis, Sam Lakeman, Catriona McKay, Karen Matheson, Bruce Molsky, Fred Morrison, Jim Murray, Tim O'Brien, Gerry O'Connor, Joan Osborne, Eddi Reader, Jenna Reid, Darrell Scott and Sharon Shannon.

==== TS3 Programmes ====
Main performers in brackets (not necessarily the composers).

- Programme One: Sophie's Dancing Feet / Andy Brown's Reel (Aly Bain, Jenna Reid, Dónal Lunny), Saint Teresa (Joan Osborne), The Lakes of Pontchartrain (Paul Brady), The Drummers of England (Russ Barenberg), Puirt A Beul / I Bhi A Da / 'S Ioma Rud A Chunna Mi / Chateid Fionnlaigh A Dh'eige / Cairistion Nighean Eoghainn (Karen Matheson, Donald Shaw), The Open Door (Darrell Scott), The Swedish Jig / Untitled Jig (Sharon Shannon, Jim Murray, Gerry O'Connor)
- Programme Two: Li'l Ro Ro / Little Martha / A Monkey Let the Hogs Out (Jerry Douglas), Back to Earth (Eddi Reader, Tim O'Brien), You'll Never Leave Harlan Alive (Darrell Scott), Hector the Hero (Jenna Reid, Aly Bain), Biodh An Deoch Seo An Laimh Mo Ruin (Julie Fowlis, Jenna Reid, Dónal Lunny), Garden Valley (Cara Dillon, Sam Lakeman), Woo'd An Marrit An A / Up Da Stroods Da Sailor Goes (Aly Bain, Jenna Reid, Bruce Molsky)
- Programme Three: Through the Gates (Russ Barenberg), Holy Water (Joan Osborne, Iris DeMent, Bruce Molsky), The Neck Belly Reels (Sharon Shannon, Gerry O'Connor, Jim Murray), The Blackest Crow (Bruce Molsky, Julie Fowlis), Rainbow (Paul Brady, Eddi Reader, Karen Matheson), Crucan Na Bpaiste (Karen Matheson, Donald Shaw), The Crossing (Tim O'Brien)
- Programme Four: Sir Aly B (Jerry Douglas), Oganaich Uir A Rinn M'Fhagail (Julie Fowlis), He Reached Down (Iris DeMent), Frank McConnell's Three Step (Phil Cunningham, Aly Bain), Look Down That Lonesome Road (Tim O'Brien), The Streets of Derry (Cara Dillon, Paul Brady, Sam Lakeman), Farewell to Uist / The Lochaber Badger / Rip the Calico (Fred Morrison, Michael McGoldrick, Dónal Lunny, Jerry Douglas)
- Programme Five: St. Anne's Reel (Aly Bain, Jerry Douglas, Russ Barenberg, Todd Parks), One More Chance (Karen Matheson, Darrell Scott, Tim O'Brien, Donald Shaw), Swan LK 243 (Catriona MacKay), Don't Try to Please Me (Paul Brady, Cara Dillon, Tim O'Brien, Darrell Scott), Bothan Airigh Am Braigh Raithneach (Julie Fowlis, Bruce Molsky), Please Don't Tell Me How The Story Ends (Joan Osborne, Bruce Molsky), Shove the Pig's Foot a Little Bit Further into the Fire (Bruce Molsky, Sharon Shannon, Jim Murray)
- Programme Six: Half Past Four (Bruce Molsky), Aye Waulken-O (Eddi Reader, Karen Matheson, Paul Brady), Brother Wind (Tim O'Brien), Sophie's Lullaby (Aly Bain, Jerry Douglas, Todd Parks, Donald Shaw), P Stands for Paddy (Cara Dillon, Paul Brady, Sam Lakeman), Shattered Cross (Darrell Scott, Paul Brady), Sail Away Ladies / Walking in the Parlour (Michael McGoldrick, Dónal Lunny, Bruce Molsky)
- Bonus Tracks (on discs only): Eleanor of Usen (Phil Cunningham, Aly Bain), There's a Whole Lot of Heaven (Iris DeMent, Bruce Molsky), The Kansas City Hornpipe/Jarlath's Tune (Fred Morrison, Bruce Molsky)

=== Transatlantic Sessions 4 ===
Musicians preparing to record during the TS4 sessions

(2009 / directed by Jerry Douglas and Aly Bain). Recorded at the Glen Lyon hunting lodge in Perthshire.

- House Band: Aly Bain, Jerry Douglas, Russ Barenberg, Michael McGoldrick, Ronan Browne, Phil Cunningham, Donald Shaw, Danny Thompson, Todd Parks and James Mackintosh.
- Featuring: Karan Casey, Rosanne Cash, Dezi Donnelly, Stuart Duncan, Julie Fowlis, James Graham, Dónal Lunny, Allan MacDonald, Karen Matheson, Allison Moorer, Mairéad Ní Mhaonaigh, Liam Ó Maonlaí, Jenna Reid, Emily Smith, James Taylor, Dan Tyminski, Niall Vallely and Martha Wainwright.

==== TS4 Programmes ====
Main performers in brackets (not necessarily the composers).

- Programme One: Fiddle Blast: The Teetotaller / Lord McDonald's Reel / High Road to Linton (Aly Bain, Stuart Duncan, Mairéad Ní Mhaonaigh, Jenna Reid), Man of Constant Sorrow (Dan Tyminski), How She Does It (Allison Moorer), Glide (Jerry Douglas), Ged A Sheol Mi Air M'Aineol (Julie Fowlis), Millworker (James Taylor), Jewels of the Ocean / We're a Case, the Bunch of Us / Tommy & Ronnie's Double Tonic (Allan MacDonald)
- Programme Two: Bleeding All Over You (Martha Wainwright), O'Farrell's Farewell to Limerick / Oot East by the Vong (Aly Bain & Dónal Lunny), Lassie Wi' the Lint-white Locks (Karen Matheson), Copperline (James Taylor), Maili Dhonn (James Graham), Flatwater Fran (Phil Cunningham), Mo Nion O (Mairéad Ní Mhaonaigh)
- Programme Three: The Boy Who Wouldn't Hoe Corn (Dan Tyminski), The Silver Tassie (Emily Smith), Paddy in the Smoke/Sporting Days of Easter / The Crosses of Annagh / Sporting Nell (Michael McGoldrick, Dezi Donnelly), Tower Song (Martha Wainwright), Gelnntain Ghlas' Ghaoth Dobhair (Mairéad Ní Mhaonaigh), Bethany's Waltz (Jenna Reid), 500 Miles Away from Home (Rosanne Cash)
- Programme Four: Mocking Bird (Allison Moorer), Lee Highway Blues (Stuart Duncan), Down in the Willow Garden (Dan Tyminski), Black is the Colour of my True Love's Eyes (Karan Casey), Kid on the Mountain / Sleep Soon in the Morning / The Reconciliation (Aly Bain), Worry Not (Liam Ó Maonlaí), Pandemonium of Pipers: Fhir A' Chinn Duibh / Una Bhan / Market Place of Inverness / Humours of Tulla / Foxhunter (Allan MacDonald & Ronan Browne)
- Programme Five: Mary Rogers / Siun Ni Dhuibhir (Dónal Lunny & Mairéad Ní Mhaonaigh), Secret Life of Roses (Rosanne Cash), Unionhouse Branch (Jerry Douglas), Caledonia (Emily Smith), The King's Shilling (Karan Casey), Carrickfergus (Allison Moorer)
- Programme Six: Belfast to Boston (James Taylor), O Nach Eisdeadh Tu 'N Sgeul Le Aire (Karen Matheson), Lily Dale (Aly Bain, Stuart Duncan & Jerry Douglas), Motherless Children (Rosanne Cash), The Pleasant Beggar (Russ Barenberg), Mo Ghruagach Dhonn (Julie Fowlis), Work Song (Liam Ó Maonlaí)
- Bonus Tracks (on discs only): Erin's Lovely Home (Karan Casey), Muireann's Jig (Niall Vallely, Mike McGoldrick & Dezi Donnelly), Black, Black, Black (Ronan Browne), Och Oin Chaileag (James Graham)

=== Transatlantic Sessions 5 ===
Group photo of the TS5 crew

(2011 / directed by Jerry Douglas and Aly Bain). Recorded at a hunting lodge at Glen Lyon near Aberfeldy in the Perthshire Highlands of Scotland.

- House Band: Aly Bain, Jerry Douglas, Russ Barenberg, John Doyle, Nollaig Casey, John McCusker, Michael McGoldrick, Donald Shaw, Danny Thompson and James Mackintosh.
- Featuring: Eric Bibb, Sam Bush, Phil Cunningham, Béla Fleck, Sarah Jarosz, Alison Krauss, Amos Lee, Dónal Lunny, Kathleen MacInnes, Iain Morrison, Jim Murray, Muireann Nic Amhlaoibh, Declan O'Rourke, Dirk Powell, Eddi Reader and Sharon Shannon.

==== TS5 Programmes ====
For each track, the main performer's name is shown in brackets (they are not necessarily the composer).

- Programme One: The Boys of 25 / The Glass of Beer (Aly Bain), Goin' Down the Road Feelin Bad (Eric Bibb), Oran na Cloiche (Kathleen MacInnes), Falani (Béla Fleck), Leezie Lindsay (Eddi Reader), Boats up the River (Dirk Powell), Lay My Burden Down (Alison Krauss)
- Programme Two: Helvic Head / Kiss the Maid (Michael McGoldrick), Annabel Lee (Sarah Jarosz), Some Sweet Day (Dirk Powell), Dreamcatcher / Off the Hook (Sharon Shannon), Time Machine (Declan O'Rourke), Lake Charles Waltz (Phil Cunningham), Jesus Can You Help Me Now (Amos Lee)
- Programme Three: Big Country (Béla Fleck), Western Highway (Muireann Nic Amhlaoibh), Clear Blue Eyes (Amos Lee), A New Day Medley (Jerry Douglas), Waterbound (Dirk Powell), Run Away (Sarah Jarosz), Lios na Banriona / The Cross Reel (Nollaig Casey)
- Programme Four: Flying Circus / Windchime Dance (Sharon Shannon), A Lewis Summer (Iain Morrison), Ring Them Bells (Sarah Jarosz), Lonesome Moonlight Waltz (Alison Krauss), The Ballad of Stringbean and Estelle (Sam Bush), Galileo (Declan O'Rourke), Dimming of the Day (Alison Krauss)
- Programme Five: The Hut on Staffin Island / Shake a Leg / Wing Commander Donald MacKenzie's Reel (Phil Cunningham), Dragonflies (Eddi Reader), Cúnla (Dónal Lunny), Leaving Limerick (Muireann Nic Amhlaoibh), Same Ol' River (Sam Bush), Gur Milis Morag (Kathleen MacInnes), Don't Ever Let Nobody Drag Your Spirit Down (Eric Bibb)
- Programme Six: The Breton Set (John McCusker), Broken Off Car Door (Iain Morrison)), Windows are Rolled Down (Amos Lee), T'aimse Im' Chodhladh (Aly Bain), Little Girl of Mine in Tennessee (Sam Bush), I Believe in You (Alison Krauss), Route Irish (Jerry Douglas)
- Bonus Tracks (on discs only): Fire in my Hands (Iain Morrison), Pé in Eirinn (Muireann Nic Amhlaoibh), Reul Alainn A' Chuain (Kathleen MacInnes), When at Last (Russ Barenberg), A Stor Mo Chroi (Nollaig Casey)

=== Transatlantic Sessions 6 ===
TS6 artists on set (left to right: Jerry Douglas, James Mackintosh, Teddy Thompson, Aoife O'Donovan, Julie Fowlis, Karen Matheson, Mary Chapin Carpenter; Aly Bain)

(2013 / directed by Jerry Douglas and Aly Bain). Recorded at Loch Lomond, Scotland.

- House Band: Aly Bain, Jerry Douglas, Russ Barenberg, John Doyle, John McCusker, Matheu Watson, Michael McGoldrick, Donald Shaw, Danny Thompson and James Mackintosh.
- Featuring: Mary Chapin Carpenter, Phil Cunningham, Cara Dillon, Julie Fowlis, Andy Irvine, Sam Lakeman, Dónal Lunny, Allan MacDonald, Ewan McLennan, Karen Matheson, Tim O'Brien, Maura O'Connell, Aoife O'Donovan and Teddy Thompson.

==== TS6 Programmes ====
For each track, the main performer's name is shown in brackets (they are not necessarily the composer).

- Programme One: Shetland Set (Aly Bain), Don't Know What I Was Thinking (Teddy Thompson), Aragon Mill (Karen Matheson), Jock Stewart (Ewan McLennan), Shotgun Down The Avalanche (Cara Dillon / Sam Lakeman), I wish I Was in Belfast Town (Andy Irvine), Bright Sunny South (Aoife O'Donovan)
- Programme Two: My Girl's Waiting For Me (Tim O'Brien), I Have A Need For Solitude (Mary Chapin Carpenter), Halloween Rehearsal (Russ Barenberg), Smeorach Chlann Domhnaill (Julie Fowlis), Cragie Hill (Cara Dillon), Wee Michael's March / D Jig / Boys of the Puddle (John McCusker)
- Programme Three: Gone To Fortingal / Wired to the Moon (Jerry Douglas / Michael McGoldrick), Transcendental Reunion (Mary Chapin Carpenter), Loch Katrine's Lady (Phil Cunningham), Oh Mama (Aoife O'Donovan), She Thinks I Still Care (Teddy Thompson), Father Dermot (Aly Bain / Mike McGoldrick), Jute Mill (Ewan McLennan)
- Programme Four: Jubilee (Mary Chapin Carpenter), Never Tire of the Road (Andy Irvine), Che Mi Bhuam (Karen Matheson), Delilah (Teddy Thompson), Isle of Malachy (Maura O'Connell), Hug Air A' Bhonaid Mhoir (Julie Fowlis), Letter in the Mail (Tim O'Brien)
- Programme Five: Liberty's Sweet Home (John Doyle), Bright Morning Star (Cara Dillon / Sam Lakeman), No Direction Home / Bright Start Over Sark (Michael McGoldrick), Whistling The Esperanza (Ewan McLennan), He Gradh Ho Gradh (Julie Fowlis), Sad The Parting / Miss Ann McKechnie / Lord McConnell of Loughearn / Rakish Paddy (Allan McDonald)
- Programme Six: Like I Used To (Tim O'Brien), The Diamond Ring (Karen Matheson), Kimberley's Waltz (Phil Cunningham), My Heart's Tonight in Ireland / West Clare Reel (Andy Irvine / Dónal Lunny), It Don't Bring You (Maura O'Connell), Hallowell (Aoife O'Donovan), On a Monday (Jerry Douglas)
