= Restless on the Farm =

Studio album by Jerry Douglas
- Released: May 19, 1998
- Studios: Masterlink Studio and Béla's (Nashville, Tennessee); Trace Sound (Franklin, Tennessee)
- Genres: Progressive bluegrass, country
- Length: 44:37
- Label: Sugar Hill
- Producer: Jerry Douglas

Jerry Douglas chronology
| Slide Rule (1992) | Restless on the Farm (1998) | Lookout for Hope (2002) |

Professional ratings
Review scores
| Source | Rating |
|---|---|
| Allmusic | 3/5 stars |

Restless on the Farm is the seventh solo album by dobro player Jerry Douglas, released in 1998 (see 1998 in music).

Guest musicians include Maura O'Connell, Steve Earle, Béla Fleck, Sam Bush and Tim O'Brien.

== Track listing ==
1. "Things in Life" (Don Stover) – 3:04
2. "Turkish Taffee" (Jerry Douglas) – 3:53
3. "Passing the Bar" (Douglas) – 3:45
4. "Don't Take Your Guns to Town" (Johnny Cash) – 5:29
5. "A Tribute to Peader O'Donnell" (Dónal Lunny) – 3:13
6. "Takarasaka" (Douglas) – 3:49
7. "Follow On" (Paul Brady) – 5:19
8. "Like It Is" (Erroll Garner) – 3:40
9. "The Ride" (Douglas, Fleck) – 2:46
10. "TV Doctor" (Johnny Winter) – 5:04
11. "For Those Who've Gone Clear" (Douglas) – 4:35

== Personnel ==
- Jerry Douglas – dobro (1, 3, 7–11), lap steel guitar (2, 4, 7, 11), Weissenborn guitar (5, 6)
- Russ Barenberg – guitars (1, 5, 7)
- Bryan Sutton – guitars (2, 8)
- Steve Earle – guitars (4), vocals (4)
- Sam Bush – National mandolin (3)
- Sonny Landreth – metal body dobro (3), slide guitar (10)
- Béla Fleck – banjo (9)
- Viktor Krauss – bass (1–4, 7, 8, 10, 11)
- Edgar Meyer – bass (5, 6)
- John Gardner – drums (2–4, 7, 8, 10, 11), percussion (2)
- Tim O'Brien – vocals (1), harmony vocals (7)
- Maura O'Connell – vocals (7)
- John Cowan – vocals (10)

=== Production ===
- Jerry Douglas – producer, mixing
- Bil Vorndick – mixing, recording (1–4, 7, 8, 10, 11)
- Bradley Hartman – recording (5, 6)
- Richard Battaglia – recording (9)
- Chris Scherbak – recording assistant (1–4, 7, 8, 10, 11)
- Randy LeRoy – mastering at Final Stage Mastering (Nashville, Tennessee)
- Jim "Señor" McGuire – photography
- Sue Meyer – design, cover illustration
