= Best of the Sugar Hill Years =

Greatest hits album by Jerry Douglas
- Released: March 13, 2007
- Genre: Progressive bluegrass, country
- Label: Sugar Hill
- Producer: Jerry Douglas, Tut Taylor

Jerry Douglas chronology
The Best Kept Secret (2005)	Best of the Sugar Hill Years (2007)	Glide (2008)

Professional ratings
Review scores
Source	Rating
Allmusic	link

Best of the Sugar Hill Years is a compilation album by dobro player Jerry Douglas, released in 2007 (see 2007 in music). It contains music recorded while Douglas was on the Sugar Hill label.

== Track listing ==
1. "The Wild Rumpus" (Jerry Douglas) – 4:03
2. "Takarasaka" (Douglas) – 3:51
3. "Senia's Lament" (Douglas) – 5:27
4. "We Hide and Seek" (Douglas) – 6:32
5. "Lullaby of the Leaves" (Bernice Petkere, Joe Young) – 4:02
6. "A New Day Medley" (Douglas) – 5:49
7. "Cave Bop" (Douglas) – 3:21
8. "Hey Joe" (Billy Roberts) – 3:10
9. "Birdland" (Joe Zawinul) – 5:25
10. "Monkey Let the Hogs Out" (Douglas) – 1:04
11. "Ride the Wild Turkey" (Darol Anger) – 3:12
12. "A Tribute to Peader O'Donnell" (Dónal Lunny) – 3:13
13. "Things in Life" (Don Stover) – 3:05
14. "Like It Is" (Erroll Garner) – 3:42
15. "In the Sweet By and By" (Traditional) – 2:02

== Personnel ==
- Jerry Douglas – dobro, lap steel guitar
- Larry Atamanuik – drums, conga, percussion
- Russ Barenberg – guitar
- Sam Bush – mandolin
- Jeff Coffin – saxophone
- Stuart Duncan – fiddle
- Béla Fleck – banjo
- John Gardner – drums
- Viktor Krauss – bass
- Edgar Meyer – bass
- Scott Nygaard – guitar
- Tim O'Brien – mandolin, vocals
- Peter Rowan – guitar, vocals
- Mark Schatz – bass
- Craig Robert Smith – banjo
- Adam Steffey – mandolin
- Bryan Sutton – guitar
