= Lookout for Hope =

Lookout for Hope may refer to:

- Lookout for Hope (Bill Frisell album), 1988
- Lookout for Hope (Jerry Douglas album), 2002
