= Glide (album) =

Studio album by Jerry Douglas
- Released: August 19, 2008
- Studios: Masterlink Studio, Ocean Way Nashville, The Squirrel Nest, Ronnie's Place Studio and Mountainside Studio (Nashville, Tennessee); Tork's Place (New Orleans, Louisiana)
- Genres: Progressive bluegrass, country
- Length: 50:40 (Standard); 55:08 (with hidden track)
- Label: Koch
- Producer: Jerry Douglas

Jerry Douglas chronology
Best of the Sugar Hill Years (2007)	Glide (2008)

Professional ratings
Review scores
Source	Rating
AllMusic	4/5 stars

Glide is the tenth solo album by American dobro player Jerry Douglas, released in 2008. Guest musicians include Rodney Crowell, Sam Bush, Tony Rice, Travis Tritt, and Earl Scruggs.

== Track listing ==
1. "Bounce" (Sam Bush, Jerry Douglas, Edgar Meyer) – 4:39
2. "Glide" (Douglas) – 3:38
3. "Marriage Made in Hollywood" (Paul Brady, Michael O'Keefe) – 5:20
4. "Route Irish" (Douglas) – 4:07
5. "Sway Sur La Rue Royale" (Douglas) – 6:06
6. "Unfolding" (Meyer) – 6:22
7. "Long Hard Road (The Sharecropper's Dream)" (Rodney Crowell) – 4:29
8. "Home Sweet Home" (Traditional) – 2:36
9. "Two Small Cars in Rome" (Douglas) – 4:05
10. "Trouble on Alum" (Traditional) – 4:21
11. "Pushed Too Far" (Douglas, Russ Barenberg) – 4:53

There is an untitled song hidden in the pregap before track 1. Search backward from the start of track 1 to reach it. The hidden song lasts about 4 minutes and is a rock instrumental with electric guitar, bass, and drums. Total disc time with the hidden track is 55:08.

== Personnel ==
- Jerry Douglas – dobro (1–4, 6–9, 11), backing vocals (3, 7), lap steel guitar (4), Weissenborn guitar (5), all instruments (10)
- Dennis Wage – keyboards (3)
- Dave Torkanowsky – acoustic piano (5)
- Guthrie Trapp – guitars (2, 4, 6, 9), electric guitar (3)
- Tony Rice – guitars (7, 8)
- Chris Eldridge – guitars (11)
- Sam Bush – mandolin (1)
- Earl Scruggs – banjo (8)
- Lloyd Green – pedal steel guitar (9)
- Edgar Meyer – bass (1)
- Todd Parks – bass (2–7, 9, 11)
- Doug Belote – drums (2–7, 9, 11)
- Luke Bulla – strings (2, 4), violin solo (2), fiddle (3, 7, 11), backing vocals (3), violin (6)
- Orange Kellin – clarinet (5)
- Kirk Joseph – sousaphone (5)
- Craig Klein – trombone (5)
- Charlie Fardella – trumpet (5)
- Travis Tritt – vocals (3)
- Rodney Crowell – lead vocals (7)
- Carmella Ramsey – backing vocals (7)

=== Production ===
- Jerry Douglas – producer
- Bil Vorndick – recording, mixing
- Steve Crowder – assistant engineer
- Chris Finney – assistant engineer
- Bryan Graban – assistant engineer
- Michael Gumm – assistant engineer
- Morgan Hobbs – assistant engineer
- Jason Lefan – assistant engineer
- Greg McGinnis – assistant engineer
- Leslie Richter – assistant engineer
- Ben Warner – assistant engineer
- Alex McCollough – mastering at Yes Master (Nashville, Tennessee)
- Jill Douglas – production assistant
- Spencer Walts – design
- Patrick Sheehan – photography
- J.P. Cutler – management

== Chart performance ==
Chart (2008)	Peak position
U.S. Billboard Top Bluegrass Albums	4
U.S. Billboard Top Country Albums	69
