= Slide rule (disambiguation) =

A slide rule is a mechanical analog computer.

Slide Rule may also refer to:

- Slide Rule (album), a 1992 album by Jerry Douglas
- Slide Rule (horse), thoroughbred racehorse
- Slide Rule: Autobiography of an Engineer, a partial autobiography of the British novelist Nevil Shute
