= Plant Early =

Studio album by Jerry Douglas
- Released: May 26, 1989
- Studios: Nashville Sound Connection (Nashville, Tennessee)
- Genres: Progressive bluegrass, country
- Length: 39:08
- Label: MCA
- Producer: Jerry Douglas

Jerry Douglas chronology
Changing Channels (1987)	Plant Early (1989)	Slide Rule (1992)

Professional ratings
Review scores
Source	Rating
Allmusic	link

Plant Early is the fifth solo album by dobro player Jerry Douglas, released in 1989 (see 1989 in music). It was his last release on the MCA label. It is out of print.

== Track listing ==
All tracks are written by Jerry Douglas, unless otherwise noted.

No.	Title	Writer(s)	Length
1.	"Pushed Too Far"	Jerry Douglas; Russ Barenberg	4:59
2.	"La Conversacion"		7:16
3.	"A Peaceful Return"		4:27
4.	"So On and So Forth"	Edgar Meyer	4:45
5.	"Mexican Rex"		4:14
6.	"Make a Wish"		3:52
7.	"The Swinging Bridge"		4:15
8.	"If You've Got the Money (Honey I've Got the Time)"	Lefty Frizzell, Jim Beck	5:20
Total length:			39:08

== Personnel ==
- Jerry Douglas – resonator guitars, lap steel guitar, steel guitar

Guest musicians

- Russ Barenberg
- Bill Lloyd
- Béla Fleck
- Stuart Duncan

== Production ==
- Jerry Douglas – producer, mixing, sleeve notes
- Bil Vorndick – engineer, mixing
- Jim Lloyd – digital editing
- Benny Quinn – digital editing, mastering
- Masterfonics (Nashville, Tennessee) – editing and mastering location
- Simon Levy – art direction
- Virginia Team – art direction, design
- Jerry Joyner – cover art
- Larry Dixon – photography
