= Fluxology =

Studio album by Jerry Douglas
- Released: 1979
- Studios: Lemco Sound Studio (Lexington, Kentucky); 1750 Arch Studios (Berkeley, California)
- Genres: Progressive bluegrass, country
- Length: 27:20
- Label: Rounder
- Producer: Jerry Douglas

Jerry Douglas chronology
Fluxology (1979)	Fluxedo (1982)

Professional ratings
Review scores
Source	Rating
AllMusic	4/5 stars

Fluxology is the debut album by dobro player Jerry Douglas, released in 1979 (see 1979 in music). The album's title comes from Douglas's nickname of "Flux."

Fluxology is out of print although most of the tracks can be found on the compilation Everything Is Gonna Work Out Fine.

== Track listing ==
1. "Fluxology" (Jerry Douglas) – 3:06
2. "Bill Cheatham" (Traditional) – 3:03
3. "Say a Little Prayer for You" (Burt Bacharach, Hal David) – 4:11
4. "C-Biscuit" (Douglas) – 3:30
5. "Randy Lynn Rag" (Earl Scruggs) – 2:19
6. "Wheel Hoss" (Bill Monroe) – 2:24
7. "Red Bud Rag" (Douglas) – 2:59
8. "Alabam" – 2:53
9. "Dixie Hoedown" (Jimmy Lunsford, Don Reno) – 1:53
10. "Blues for Vickie" (Douglas) – 1:02

== Personnel ==
- Jerry Douglas – dobro
- Buck White – acoustic piano (8)
- Tony Rice – guitars (1–4, 6)
- Wes Golding – guitars (5, 7, 9)
- Ricky Skaggs – mandolin (1–9), fiddle (2, 5–7, 9), violin (3, 4)
- Jack Hicks – banjo (2, 6–8)
- J. D. Crowe – banjo (5, 9)
- Todd Phillips – bass (1–4, 6)
- Bobby Stone – bass (5, 9)
- Steve Bryant – bass (7, 8)
- Darol Anger – violin (1)
- Terry Baucom – fiddle (8)

== Production ==
- Jerry Douglas – producer, mixing (2, 5–9)
- Robert Shumaker – recording (1, 3, 4)
- Ricky Skaggs – mixing (1, 3, 4, 10)
- Phil Copeland – recording (2, 5–10)
- Dave Crawford – mastering at Masterdisk (New York City, New York)
- Susan Marsh – graphic design
- Brant Gamma – photography
- David Grisman – liner notes
