= Under the Wire =

Studio album by Jerry Douglas
- Released: 1986
- Studios: Nashville Sound Connection (Nashville, Tennessee)
- Genres: Progressive bluegrass, country
- Length: 38:35
- Label: MCA
- Producer: Jerry Douglas

Jerry Douglas chronology
| Fluxedo (1982) | Under the Wire (1986) | Changing Channels (1987) |

Professional ratings
Review scores
| Source | Rating |
|---|---|
| Allmusic | 3/5 stars |

Under the Wire is the third solo album by dobro player Jerry Douglas, released in 1986 (see 1986 in music). It was his first release on the MCA label. Under the Wire was reissued on CD by Sugar Hill in 1995.

== Track listing ==
All songs by Jerry Douglas unless otherwise noted.

1. "T.O.B." – 3:32
2. "Dhaka Rok" – 3:20
3. "Time Gone By" (Edgar Meyer) – 2:44
4. "Monroe's Hornpipe" (Bill Monroe) – 3:23
5. "Before the Blues" – 5:31
6. "The Trip to Kilkerrin" – 3:23
7. "Grant's Corner" – 5:34
8. "Redhill" (John Reischman) – 4:58
9. "Two Friends" – 2:58
10. "A New Day " – 3:36

== Personnel ==
- Jerry Douglas – dobro (1, 3–10), lap steel guitar (2)
- Russ Barenberg – guitars (1–8, 10)
- Béla Fleck – banjo (2, 4–6, 8, 9), mandolin (3)
- Sam Bush – mandolin (2, 4, 5, 8)
- Glenn Worf – bass (1–8, 10)
- Edgar Meyer – arco bass (1, 3)
- Neil Worf – drums (1, 3–8, 10), percussion (1, 3–8, 10)
- Mark O'Connor – violin (1, 4–8)
- Connie Heard – violin (3)

== Production ==
- Jerry Douglas – producer
- Bil Vorndick – first engineer
- Benny Quinn – mastering at Masterfonics (Nashville, Tennessee)
- Simon Levy – art direction
- Camille Brown – design
- Jim "Señor" McGuire – photography
