= Fluxedo =

Studio album by Jerry Douglas
- Released: 1982
- Studios: Bull Run Studios (Ashland, Tennessee)
- Genres: Progressive bluegrass, country
- Length: 36:30
- Label: Rounder
- Producer: Jerry Douglas

Jerry Douglas chronology
Fluxology (1979)	Fluxedo (1982)	Under the Wire (1986)

Professional ratings
Review scores
Source	Rating
Allmusic	link

Fluxedo is the second album by dobro player Jerry Douglas, released in 1982 (see 1982 in music). The album's title comes from Douglas' nickname of "Flux". Fluxedo is out of print although all of the tracks can be found on the compilation Everything Is Gonna Work Out Fine.

The type of formal wear shown in the cover photo is actually not a tuxedo. A tuxedo, also known as black tie is a type of male semi-formal evening wear. The clothing outfit shown in the cover photo is a type of very-formal daytime wear, known as a morning suit or morning dress.

== Track listing ==
1. "Tennessee Fluxedo" (Jerry Douglas) – 4:51
2. "Sunny Skies" (James Taylor) – 3:01
3. "Intro" – 4:03
4. "Tell Her Lies (and Feed Her Candy)" (Joe McCracken) – 2:13
5. "Birth of the Blues" (Lew Brown, Buddy DeSylva, Ray Henderson) – 3:35
6. "Nite Crawler" – 3:26
7. "Cincinnati Rag" (David Franklin) – 2:28
8. "Panhandle Rag" (Leon McAuliffe) – 4:54
9. "I Think It's Gonna Work Out Fine" (Robert Lee McCoy, Sylvia McKinney) – 4:15
10. "Ben Dewberry's Final Run" (Andrew Jenkins) – 3:44

== Personnel ==
- Jerry Douglas – dobro, lap steel guitar (9), vocal (10)
- David Parmley – guitar (1, 3, 5, 7)
- Russ Barenberg – guitar (6, 10), guitar solo (8)
- Sharon White – guitar (8, 10)
- Ricky Skaggs – guitar (9)
- Béla Fleck – banjo (1, 3–8)
- Buck White – mandolin (1, 3–5, 7, 8), acoustic piano (2, 10)
- Mark Schatz – bass (1–3, 7), guitar (5)
- Cheryl Warren – Earthwood bass (6), bass (8–10)
- Rich Adler – percussion (9)
- Sam Bush – fiddle (1, 3), mandolin (6), slide mandolin (9)
- Phil Gazell – harmonica (6, 10)

== Production ==
- Jerry Douglas – producer
- Rich Adler – engineer
- Jim Lloyd – mastering at Masterfonics (Nashville, Tennessee)
- Dick Blattenberger – jacket design, artwork
- Ted Anderson – front cover photography
- Jim "Señor" McGuire – back cover photography
