= Terry Baucom =

American singer-songwriter (1952–2023)

Background information
- Born: October 6, 1952; Monroe, North Carolina, U.S.
- Died: December 7, 2023 (aged 71)
- Genres: Bluegrass music
- Occupations: Musician, singer
- Instruments: Banjo, fiddle
- Formerly of: Charlie Moore, Doyle Lawson and Quicksilver, IIIrd Tyme Out
- Website: terrybaucom.com

Terry Baucom (October 6, 1952 – December 7, 2023) was an American bluegrass banjo player, fiddle player, vocalist and band leader. He was nicknamed "The Duke of Drive" for his propelling, driving banjo style. He led his band, The Dukes of Drive, and was a founding member of Boone Creek, Doyle Lawson and Quicksilver, and IIIrd Tyme Out.

== Biography ==
=== Early years ===
Baucom began playing banjo at age 10, drawn to banjo because of the Beverly Hillbillies television show. He started playing fiddle at age 14. His father played guitar, his grandfather played clawhammer banjo, and his great-grandfather played fiddle. Baucom played the banjo in his father Lloyd Baucom's group The Rocky River Boys. Baucom played fiddle with Charlie Moore from 1970 until 1973.

=== Boone Creek ===
In 1976, Baucom was a founding member of Boone Creek at age 24 years with Ricky Skaggs, Wes Golding, Jerry Douglas and Steve Bryant.

=== Doyle Lawson and Quicksilver ===
After two years, Boone Creek disbanded, and Baucom became a founding member of Doyle Lawson's original Quicksilver combo from 1979 until 1985. From 2003 until 2007, Baucom re-joined Doyle Lawson and Quicksilver for a second stint.

=== The New Quicksilver and BlueRidge ===
In 1986, Baucom formed the short-lived band The New Quicksilver with Randy Graham (bass), Alan Bibey (mandolin), and Jimmy Haley (guitar). In 1998, Baucom formed BlueRidge, which was a reunited New Quicksilver. In 2001, the ensemble recorded the album Baucom, Bibey, Graham & Haley on Rebel Records.

=== IIIrd Tyme Out ===
Baucom was a founding member of IIIrd Tyme Out in 1991 with Russell Moore (guitar), Mike Hargrove (fiddle), and Ray Deaton (bass).

=== Carolina and Other Opportunities ===
From 1993, Baucom until 1996, Baucom was a member of Carolina with Lou Reid who started the band named Carolina. In 1996, Baucom stopped touring so he could freelance and teach music in the Charlotte, North Carolina, area.

Baucom was a part-time member of the Mark Newton Band and the Kenny and Amanda Smith Band. In 2009, Baucom joined Dale Ann Bradley's band, then the Mashville Brigade. He also occasionally performed with Mountain Heart with Tony Rice.

=== Dukes of Drive ===
Baucom's band, "Terry Baucom's Dukes of Drive," originally consisted of Joey Lemons (mandolin, vocals), Will Jones (guitar, vocals), and Joe Hannabach (bass). Their 2015 single "The Rock" was bluegrass radio's most-played song on the Bluegrass Today chart.

In 2021, Joey Lemons and Will Jones departed the band with Troy Boone (mandolin, vocals) and Clay Jones (guitar, vocals) temporarily stepping in to fill their places. Will Clark (mandolin, vocals) and Clint Coker (guitar, vocals) soon took up the positions full time, in September and December of 2021.

=== Solo albums ===
For his first solo album In a Groove, Baucom put together a core band of Wyatt Rice (guitar), Barry Bales (bass), Adam Steffey (mandolin), and Jason Carter (fiddle). Russell Moore, John Cowan, and Ronnie Bowman make vocal appearances.

2013's Never Thought of Looking Back featured guest vocalists Buddy Melton, Larry Cordle, Sam Bush, Marty Raybon, John Cowen, and Tim Stafford. The instrumentalists include Bush (mandolin), Jerry Douglas (resonator guitar), Wyatt Rice (guitar), Aubrey Haynie (fiddle), and Steve Bryant (bass).

=== Deering Terry Baucom Model Banjo ===
The Deering Terry Baucom banjo has a red walnut frame and bronze 20-hole tone ring with an 11/16″ bridge and slightly wider string spacing.

=== Personal life and death ===
Terry's wife Cindy Baucom hosts a syndicated radio show Knee Deep in Bluegrass. She was named Broadcaster of the Year by the IBMA in 2005 and 2017 and was inducted into the Blue Ridge Music Hall of Fame in 2012.

Baucom died from complications of Lewy body dementia on December 7, 2023, at the age of 71.

== Awards ==
In 2001, Baucom won the International Bluegrass Music Association (IBMA) Instrumental Recording of the Year award. He also won the 2013 IBMA Recorded Event of the Year award for "What'll I Do."

== Discography ==
=== Solo albums ===
- 2010: In a Groove (John Boy & Billy, Inc.)
- 2013: Never Thought Of Looking Back (John Boy & Billy, Inc.)

=== With Charlie Moore and the Dixie Partners ===
- 1975: The Fiddler (Old Homestead)
- 1983: Country Music Memories Volume 1 (Old Homestead)

=== With Boone Creek ===
- 1977: Boone Creek (Rounder)
- 1978: One Way Track (Sugar Hill)

=== With Doyle Lawson and Quicksilver ===
- 1979: Doyle Lawson & Quicksilver (Sugar Hill)
- 1981: Rock My Soul (Sugar Hill)
- 1982: Quicksilver Rides Again (Sugar Hill)
- 1983: Heavenly Treasures (Sugar Hill)
- 1985: Once & for Always (Sugar Hill)
- 2004: A School of Bluegrass (Crossroads)
- 2005: You Gotta Dig a Little Deeper (Rounder)
- 2006: He Lives in Me (Horizon)
- 2007: More Behind the Picture Than the Wall (Rounder)

=== With The New Quicksilver ===
- 1986: Ready for the Times (Cross Current)

=== With IIIrd Tyme Out ===
- 1991: IIIrd Tyme Out (Rebel)
- 1992: Puttin' New Roots Down (Rebel)

=== With Lou Reid ===
- 1991: When It Rains (Sugar Hill)
- 1993: Carolina Blue (Webco)
- 1994: Carolina Moon (Rebel) as Terry Baucom, Lou Reid, and Carolina

=== With Blueridge ===
- 1999: Common Ground (Sugar Hill)

=== As Baucom, Bibey and BlueRidge ===
- 2002: Come Along With Me (Sugar Hill)

=== With Terry Baucom's Dukes of Drive ===
- 2016: Around the Corner (John Boy & Billy, Inc.)
- 2017: 4th and Goal (John Boy & Billy, Inc.)

=== Also appears on ===
- 1974: L. W. Lambert and the Blue River Boys - Natural Grass (United Music World)
- 1975: Ricky Skaggs - That's It (Rebel)
- 1977: Dan & Jenny Brock - High Flying (Lemco Studio)
- 1979: Jerry Douglas - Fluxology (Rounder)
- 1987: Jerry Douglas - Everything Is Gonna Work Out Fine (Rounder)
- 1998: Ronnie Bowman - The Man I'm Tryin' to Be (Sugar Hill)
- 2000: Alan Bibey - In the Blue Room (Sugar Hill)
- 2000: Herschel Sizemore - My Style (Hay Holler)
- 2001 Candlewyck – Firemen (Votive Records)
- 2009: Grasstowne - The Other Side of Towne (Pinecastle)
- 2009: Jim Lauderdale - Could We Get Any Closer? (Sky Crunch)
- 2009: Brad Wood - For a Reason (Cotton Top)

=== Music Instruction ===
- Terry Baucom: The Duke of Drive VHS (AcuTab)
- 1995: AcuTab Transcriptions Vol. 1 book (AcuTab)
- 2007: Driving with the Duke: Banjo Techniques of Terry Baucom DVD (John Boy & Billy, Inc.)
