= A Real Life Story =

Studio album by Maura O'Connell
- Released: 1991
- Label: Warner Bros.
- Producer: Greg Penny

Maura O'Connell chronology
| Always (1989) | A Real Life Story (1991) | Blue Is the Colour of Hope (1992) |

A Real Life Story is an album by the Irish musician Maura O'Connell, released in 1991. The album originally included a market research card, to be mailed to Warner Bros., a decision that was met with criticism.

== Production ==
Recorded in Nashville with session musicians, the album was produced by Greg Penny. "Broken Bicycles" is a cover of the Tom Waits song; O'Connell also covered, among others, Janis Ian, John Hiatt, and Lennon–McCartney. O'Connell's sisters sang on "A Family Tie".

== Critical reception ==
Professional ratings
Review scores
| Source | Rating |
|---|---|
| AllMusic | 2.5/5 stars |
| Chicago Tribune | 3/4 stars |
| The Cincinnati Post | 2.5/4 stars |
| The Encyclopedia of Popular Music | 3/5 stars |
| MusicHound Rock: The Essential Album Guide | 4.5/5 stars |

The Washington Post wrote that "the album's failings are small but bothersome... O'Connell's affection for reflective ballads occasionally leads her to sing lightweight lyrics that convey more a sense of general moodiness than real emotion." Entertainment Weekly thought that "O'Connell proves a marvelous vocal actress." The Chicago Tribune concluded that O'Connell "combines a gorgeous, supple voice with an impeccable taste in material."

The Milwaukee Sentinel determined that, despite being an album of covers, "the result is one of the warmest and in its own way most personal albums of the young year." The St. Petersburg Times stated that "the LP's best track, Larry Tagg's 'Burning My Rowboat', [is] a light-hearted number that deals with deliberate, self-imposed isolation." The Cincinnati Post panned the "more contemporary sound," writing that "the backing is dull." Stereo Review included the album on its list of the top 36 albums of 1991.

AllMusic wrote that "the arrangements ... strike a balance between rustic simplicity and art-pop complexity without tipping too far in either direction."

== Track listing ==
| No. | Title | Length |
|---|---|---|
| 1. | "When Your Heart Is Weak" |
| 2. | "Burning Your Rowboat" |
| 3. | "A Family Tie" |
| 4. | "Ireland" |
| 5. | "Unwinding" |
| 6. | "Guns of Love" |
| 7. | "I Don't Know Why" |
| 8. | "For No One" |
| 9. | "When We Ran" |
| 10. | "Broken Bicycles" |
