= Lookout for Hope (Jerry Douglas album) =

Studio album by Jerry Douglas
- Released: May 7, 2002
- Studios: Dark Horse Recording Studio (Franklin, Tennessee); Mountainside Studio (Tobyhanna, Pennsylvania); Q Division Studios (Somerville, Massachusetts); The Barn (Burlington, Vermont)
- Genres: Progressive bluegrass, country
- Length: 48:29
- Label: Sugar Hill
- Producer: Jerry Douglas

Jerry Douglas chronology
Restless on the Farm (1998)	Lookout for Hope (2002)	The Best Kept Secret (2005)

Professional ratings
Review scores
Source	Rating
Allmusic	link

Lookout for Hope is the eighth solo album by dobro player Jerry Douglas, released in 2002 (see 2002 in music). It reached number 5 on the Billboard Top New Age chart. The title piece was written by guitarist Bill Frisell who released an album with the same title in 1988.

Guest musicians include Maura O'Connell, Sam Bush, James Taylor, Trey Anastasio and Jeff Coffin.

== Track listing ==
All tracks are written by Jerry Douglas, unless otherwise noted.

No.	Title	Writer(s)	Length
1.	"Little Martha"	Duane Allman	3:41
2.	"Patrick Meets the Brickbats"		3:22
3.	"Footsteps Fall"	Annette Bjergfeldt, Boo Hewerdine	4:48
4.	"Monkey Let the Hogs Out"		1:02
5.	"Lookout for Hope"	Bill Frisell	10:24
6.	"Cave Bop"		3:20
7.	"Senia's Lament"		5:25
8.	"The Wild Rumpus"		4:02
9.	"The Sinking Ship"		5:05
10.	"In the Sweet By and By"	Joseph Philbrick Webster; Sanford Fillmore Bennett	1:59
11.	"The Suit"	Hugh Prestwood	5:21
Total length:			48:29

== Personnel ==
- Jerry Douglas – dobro, lap steel guitar (3, 7, 11), backing vocals (3), Kona guitar (4, 10)
- Bryan Sutton – guitar (2, 3, 5, 8), electric guitar (6)
- Trey Anastasio – guitar (5)
- Ron Block – guitar (11)
- Sam Bush – mandolin (2, 3, 5)
- Chris Thile – mandolin (5)
- Barry Bales – bass (1–3, 5, 11)
- Viktor Krauss – bass (6–9)
- Larry Atamanuik – drums (2, 3, 6–9), conga (7), percussion (7, 9)
- Stuart Duncan – fiddle (2, 3, 11)
- Jeff Coffin – saxophone (6, 8, 9)
- Maura O'Connell – vocals (3)
- James Taylor – vocals (11)

=== Production ===
- Jerry Douglas – producer
- Gary Paczosa – engineer (1–3, 5)
- Jon Lupfer – engineer (4, 10, 11)
- Bil Vorndick – engineer (6–9)
- Chuck Eller – engineer
- Brian Boyd – assistant engineer
- Tim O'Dell – assistant engineer
- Rafi Sofer – assistant engineer
- Todd Wells – assistant engineer
- Chuck Ainlay – mixing at Back Stage Studio (Nashville, Tennessee)
- Doug Delong – mix assistant
- Randy LeRoy – mastering at Final Stage Mastering (Nashville, Tennessee)
- Jill Douglas – production assistant
- Mike Smith – photography
- Shawne Brown – photography assistant
- Sue Meyer – design
- Craig Havighurst – liner notes

== Chart positions ==
Year	Chart	Position
2002	Billboard Top New Age Albums	5
