= The Best Kept Secret (Jerry Douglas album) =

Studio album by Jerry Douglas
- Released: September 20, 2005
- Studios: Sound Emporium Studios, The Squirrel Nest, Cartee Day Studios and The Doghouse (Nashville, Tennessee); Taylor Made Studios (Los Angeles, California)
- Genres: Progressive bluegrass, country
- Length: 52:02
- Label: Koch
- Producer: Jerry Douglas

Jerry Douglas chronology
Lookout for Hope (2002)	The Best Kept Secret (2005)	Best of the Sugar Hill Years (2007)

Professional ratings
Review scores
Source	Rating
Allmusic	link

The Best Kept Secret is the ninth solo album by dobro player Jerry Douglas, released in 2005 (see 2005 in music).

Guest musicians include Alison Krauss, Sam Bush, John Fogerty, Bill Frisell, Béla Fleck and Jeff Coffin.

== Track listing ==
All songs by Jerry Douglas unless otherwise noted.

1. "She Makes Me Want to Sing" (Jerry Douglas, Derek Trucks) – 5:53
2. "Who's Your Uncle?" – 3:28
3. "Back in Love Again" (Zane Grey, Len Ron Hanks) – 3:56
4. "A Remark You Made" (Joe Zawinul) – 4:38
5. "The Best Kept Secret" – 9:30
6. "Lil' Roro" – 5:20
7. "Swing Blues No. 1" (Bob Wills) – 3:34
8. "Snow's First Fall" (Gabe Witcher) – 4:35
9. "Ya Ya etc." – 4:52
10. "U R My Flower" – 1:13
11. "Sir Aly B" – 5:03

== Personnel ==
- Jerry Douglas – dobro, electric guitar, lap steel guitars, resonator guitars
- Gabe Witcher – Hammond B3 organ, violin
- John Deaderick – Wurlitzer electric piano (3)
- Keith Sewell – acoustic guitars, electric guitars
- Derek Trucks – second slide guitar (1)
- Bill Frisell – guitars (6)
- John Fogerty – guitars (7), vocals (7)
- Béla Fleck – banjo (2)
- Sam Bush – mandolin (2)
- Derek Jones – acoustic bass (1, 2, 4–11)
- Viktor Krauss – bass (3, 6)
- Shannon Forrest – drums (1, 2, 4–11), percussion (1, 2, 4–11)
- Jim White – drums (3)
- Jeff Coffin – saxophone (5)
- Alison Krauss – vocals (3)

=== Production ===
- Jerry Douglas – producer
- Avi Kipper – recording
- Jason Lehning – recording, mixing
- Zach Dycus – recording assistant
- Josh Muncy – recording assistant
- Jim DeMain – mastering at Yes Master (Nashville, Tennessee)
- Jill Douglas – production assistant
- Michelle Lukianovich – art direction, design
- Jim Marchese – photography
- D.J. McLachlan for McLachlan Management International – management
- Keith Case for Keith Case & Associates – agency
