= Changing Channels (Jerry Douglas album) =

Studio album by Jerry Douglas
- Released: 1987
- Studios: Nashville Sound Connection (Nashville, Tennessee)
- Genres: Progressive bluegrass, country
- Length: 45:47
- Label: MCA
- Producer: Jerry Douglas

Jerry Douglas chronology
Under the Wire (1986)	Changing Channels (1987)	Everything Is Gonna Work Out Fine (1987)

Professional ratings
Review scores
Source	Rating
Allmusic	3/5 stars

Changing Channels is the fourth solo album by dobro player Jerry Douglas, released in 1987 (see 1987 in music). It was his second release on the MCA label.

== Track listing ==
No.	Title	Writer(s)	Length
1.	"From Ankara to Izmir"	Jerry Douglas	6:04
2.	"Distance/Winter's Edge"	Béla Fleck	4:23
3.	"Emphysema Two Step"	Jerry Douglas, Russ Barenberg	3:13
4.	"Waltzing on Thin Ice"	Larry Paxton, Kristin Wilkinson	5:34
5.	"Changing Channels"	Jerry Douglas	4:54
6.	"Freemantle"	Jerry Douglas, Béla Fleck	3:28
7.	"St. Anne's Reel"	Jerry Douglas	4:56
8.	"(Write It on) The Tablet of Your Heart"	Douglas; Russ Barenberg	6:36
9.	"Solo: Middle of the Medley"	Jerry Douglas; Russ Barenberg; Bill Monroe	6:39
Total length:			45:47

== Personnel ==
- Jerry Douglas – dobro, lap steel guitar (1)
- Buck White – acoustic piano (3)
- Bessyl Duhon – accordion (3)
- Edgar Meyer – keyboards (4)
- Russ Barenberg – guitar (1, 3, 5, 7–9), electric guitar (4), mandolin (8)
- Béla Fleck – guitar (2, 6), banjo (5)
- Glenn Worf – bass (1–6, 8, 9)
- Neil Worf – drums (1, 3–5, 8, 9)
- Mark O'Connor – fiddle (1, 8)
- Ricky Skaggs – fiddle (3)

The 'A' Strings on "Waltzing on Thin Ice"

- Conni Ellisor
- Connie Heard
- Edgar Meyer
- Kris Wilkinson

== Production ==
- Jerry Douglas – producer
- Bil Vorndick – recording, mixing
- Milan Bogdan – digital editing
- Jim Lloyd – mastering
- Masterfonics (Nashville, Tennessee) – editing and mastering location
- Simon Levy – art direction
- Virginia Team – design
- Bruce Matthews – illustration
- Jim "Señor" McGuire – back cover photography
