= Russell Moore and IIIrd Tyme Out =

American bluegrass band

- Also known as: IIIrd Tyme Out (until 2009)
- Origin: Cumming, Georgia, USA
- Genres: Bluegrass; gospel
- Years active: 1991–present
- Labels: Rebel; Rounder; Rural Rhythm
- Members: Russell Moore; Wayne Benson; Keith McKinnon; Nathan Aldridge; Colton Baker
- Past members: Ray Deaton; Mike Hartgrove; Terry Baucom; Alan Bibey; Lou Reid; Barry Abernathy; Steve Dilling; Greg Luck; Alan Perdue; Justen Haynes; Edgar Loudermilk; Blake Johnson; Jerry Cole; Dustin Pyrtle; Kevin McKinnon
- Website: iiirdtymeout.com

Russell Moore and IIIrd Tyme Out (formerly known as IIIrd Tyme Out) is an American bluegrass band formed in 1991 in Cumming, Georgia. Consisting of Russell Moore (lead vocals and guitar), Keith McKinnon (vocals and banjo), Nathan Aldridge (vocals and fiddle), Wayne Benson (vocals and mandolin) and Colton Baker (vocals and bass), the band has released thirteen albums and two greatest hits collections since 1991. A regular on bluegrass radio, their works have earned them many individual and group IBMA and SPBGMA award nominations including the prestigious IBMA Vocal Group of the Year award which they have won numerous times.

== Band changes ==
In November 2013, banjo player Steve Dilling and bass player Edgar Loudermilk announced their intentions to leave IIIrd Tyme Out. Steve Dilling cited health reasons as his reason for leaving the band while Edgar Loudermilk decided to capitalize on a songwriting and solo CD push. It was later announced that Keith McKinnon would be the new banjo player and Blake Johnson would be the new bass player. The new lineup performed together on stage for the first time in January 2014 in Galax, Virginia.

== Touring ==
IIIrd Tyme Out headlined at the Central Canadian Bluegrass Awards show in Huntsville, Ontario, Canada in 1996 and again in 1998. They performed at the 4th Annual Willow Park Bluegrass Jamboree in Hagersville, Ontario, in August, 2002. In 2005 they performed at the Gettysburg Bluegrass Festival. The band toured as part of the Bluegrass Sundays Winter Concert Series organized by the Northern Bluegrass Committee in Ontario, Canada in 2011.

In 2016 IIIrd Tyme Out continued to maintain a busy touring schedule; in 2016 they performed at the Tallgrass Festival in Oklahoma.

== Awards ==
- The Independent Music Awards: Best Country/Bluegrass Song: "My Lord's Gonna Be There"
- IBMA Vocal Group of the Year: 1994, 1995, 1996, 1997, 1998, 1999, 2000
- IBMA Male Vocalist of the Year: Russell Moore - 1994, 1997, 2010
- SPBGMA Bluegrass Vocal Group & Contemporary Gospel Group: 2001

Full List

== Members ==
Current members

- Russell Moore — lead vocals, guitar (1991–present)
- Wayne Benson — mandolin, mandola, backing vocals (1992–2004, 2007–present)
- Keith McKinnon — banjo, backing vocals (2013–present)
- Nathan Aldridge — fiddle, backing vocals (2018–present)
- Colton Baker — bass, backing vocals (2023–present)

== Discography ==
=== Studio albums ===
Title	Album details	Peak chart positions			
Title	Album details	US Grass	US	US Heat	US Indie
IIIrd Tyme Out	Release date: 1991; Label: Rebel Records	—	—	—	—
Puttin' New Roots Down	Release date: 1992; Label: Rebel Records	—	—	—	—
Grandpa's Mandolin	Release date: 1993; Label: Rebel Records	—	—	—	—
Letter to Home	Release date: 1996; Label: Rounder Records	—	—	—	—
Living on the Other Side	Release date: 1997; Label: Rounder Records	—	—	—	—
Live at the Mac	Release date: April 7, 1998; Label: Rounder Records	—	—	—	—
John & Mary	Release date: October 5, 1999; Label: Rounder Records	—	—	—	—
Back to the Mac	Release date: October 2, 2001; Label: Rounder Records	—	—	—	—
Singing on Streets of Gold	Release date: 2002; Label: Chateau Music Group	—	—	—	—
The Best Durn Ride	Release date: June 1, 2004; Label: Chateau Music Group	13	—	—	—
Round III at the MAC	Release date: October 3, 2006; Label: Chateau Music Group	—	—	—	—
Russell Moore and IIIrd Tyme Out	Release date: May 19, 2009; Label: Rural Rhythm Records	6	—	—	—
Prime Tyme	Release date: October 24, 2011; Label: Rural Rhythm Records	8	—	—	—
Timeless Hits from the Past: Bluegrassed	Release date: January 7, 2013; Label: Cracker Barrel	1	161	1	18
It's About Tyme	Release date: September 4, 2015; Label: Break a String				
"—" denotes releases that did not chart

=== Compilations ===
Title	Album details
Erase the Miles	Release date: January 20, 2004; Label: Rebel Records
Footprints: A IIIrd Tyme Out Compilation	Release date: 2007; Label: Rounder Records
