= Slide Rule (album) =

Studio album by Jerry Douglas
- Released: 1992
- Recorded: October – November 1991
- Studios: Music Row Audio (Nashville, Tennessee)
- Genres: Progressive bluegrass, country
- Length: 40:08
- Label: Sugar Hill
- Producer: Jerry Douglas

Jerry Douglas chronology
Plant Early (1989)	Slide Rule (1992)	Restless on the Farm (1998)

Professional ratings
Review scores
Source	Rating
Allmusic	link

Slide Rule is the sixth solo album by dobro player Jerry Douglas, released in 1992 (see 1992 in music). It was his first release on the Sugar Hill label.

Guest musicians include Alison Krauss, Sam Bush and Tim O'Brien.

== Track listing ==
1. "Ride the Wild Turkey" (Darol Anger) – 3:10
2. "Pearlie Mae" (Ed Snodderly) – 3:29
3. "When Papa Played the Dobro" (Johnny Cash) – 2:26
4. "We Hide & Seek" (Jerry Douglas) – 6:29
5. "I Don't Believe You've Met My Baby" (Autry Inman) – 3:10
6. "Shoulder to Shoulder" (Douglas, Mark Schatz) – 2:41
7. "Uncle Sam" (Douglas) – 0:38
8. "It's a Beautiful Life" (Erica Ehm, Tim Thorney) – 3:56
9. "Rain on Oliviatown" (Douglas) – 2:04
10. "Hey Joe" (Billy Roberts) – 3:07
11. "A New Day Medley" (Douglas) – 5:46
12. "Shenandoah Breakdown" (Bill Monroe) – 3:12

== Personnel ==
Musicians

- Jerry Douglas – dobro (1–6, 8, 10–12), Weissenborn guitar (5, 7, 9)
- Scott Nygaard – guitars (1–5, 8, 12)
- Russ Barenberg – guitars (6)
- Arty McGlynn – guitars (10)
- Craig Smith – banjo (1–5, 8, 12)
- Alan O'Bryant – banjo (6)
- Adam Steffey – mandolin (1–5, 8, 12)
- Sam Bush – mandolin (6)
- Tim O'Brien – mandolin (10)
- Mark Schatz – bass (1–6, 8, 12)
- Stuart Duncan – fiddle (1–6, 8, 12), moon harp (5)

Vocalists

- Ed Snodderly – vocals (2)
- Eugene Wolf – vocals (2)
- Alan O'Bryant – vocals (3)
- Alison Krauss – vocals (5)
- Maura O'Connell – vocals (8)
- Tim O'Brien – vocals (10)

== Production ==
- Jerry Douglas – producer, liner notes
- Bil Vorndick – recording, mixing
- Bruce Dees – select editing
- David Glasser – mastering at Airshow Mastering (Springfield, Virginia)
- Bob Murray – design
- Peter Nash – photography
- Pete Kuykendall – liner notes
