= Wayne Benson =

American mandolinist (born 1969)

- Born: John Wayne Benson; April 9, 1969 (age 57); Charlotte, North Carolina, U.S.
- Genres: Bluegrass music
- Occupation: Musician
- Instrument: Mandolin
- Years active: 1989–present
- Label: Pinecastle Records
- Website: iiirdtymeout.com

John Wayne Benson is an American mandolinist and songwriter in the bluegrass tradition. He is best known for his unique approach to the mandolin, and his long-term involvement with Russell Moore and IIIrd Tyme Out.

== History ==
=== Early years ===
Benson was raised in Charlotte, North Carolina, in a musical family where his father John Benson played fiddle, banjo, and guitar with his uncles. Gifted a Roy Rogers guitar for Christmas when he was seven, Benson learned how to play, sitting in on family music gatherings. At age 15, he began playing mandolin. In his late teens, Benson was part of the bluegrass music scene in Denton, North Carolina.

=== Livewire ===
In 1989, Scott Vestal invited Benson to join the band Livewire with Ernie Sykes (bass) and Robert Hale (guitar). Benson played with Livewire for three years, recording one album Wired in 1990 on Rounder Records. Benson also participated when Livewire reunited in 1999 for one show.

=== IIIrd Tyme Out and John Cowan ===
In 1993, Benson joined the band Russell Moore and IIIrd Tyme Out. Benson left IIIrd Tyme Out in 2004 to play with the John Cowan Band, recording two albums with them. In 2007, Benson returned to IIIrd Tyme Out and has remained with them since. Besides Moore and Benson, the current lineup includes Nathan Aldridge (fiddle), Keith McKinnon (banjo), and Dustin Pyrtle (bass).

=== Solo and collaborative projects ===
In 2003, Benson released his solo album An Instrumental Anthology on Pinecastle Records. The album featured 12 original compositions, and guests included Vestal, Cowan, Aubrey Haynie, Rob Ickes, Mark Schatz, Ron Stewart, and Jim Van Cleve.

Benson recorded Mandolin Chronicles with Alan Bibey in 2013, an album of mandolin duets. Supporting artists included Ron Stewart (banjo, fiddle), Wyatt Rice (guitar), and Harold Nixon (bass).

=== Other projects ===
As part of their Artist Signature Series, Gibson issued the Wayne Benson Signature mandolin in 2003, based on the F-5 scroll body design. Only 50 were made available.

In 2004, Benson released Wayne Benson - A Mandolin Anthology, a music instruction DVD.

In 2006, Benson performed with the Wreckers, a duo featuring Michelle Branch and Jessica Harp. Assisting with their publicity tour, he appeared on The Tonight Show, CBS This Morning, The Late Late Show, and other shows.

=== Awards ===
Benson earned the Society for the Preservation of Bluegrass Music of America (SPBGMA) Mandolin Player of the Year award for five consecutive years (1999-2003).

IIIrd Tyme Out won seven consecutive International Bluegrass Music Association (IBMA) awards for ‘Vocal Group of the Year’ (1994-2000).

=== Personal life ===
After living in Nashville for 16 years, Benson lives in Boiling Springs, South Carolina. He is married to bluegrass musician Kristin Scott Benson (The Grascals). He teaches private mandolin lessons in the Spartanburg, South Carolina area.

== Discography ==
=== Solo recordings ===
- 2003: An Instrumental Anthology (Pinecastle)

=== Alan Bibey and Wayne Benson ===
- 2013: The Mandolin Chronicles (Pinecastle)

=== With Livewire ===
1990: Wired (Rounder)

=== With Russell Moore and IIIrd Tyme Out ===
- 1993: Grandpa's Mandolin (Rebel)
- 1994: Across The Miles (New Haven)
- 1995: Letter To Home (Rounder)
- 1996: Living on the Other Side (Rounder)
- 1998: Live At The MAC (The Mountain Arts Center) (Rounder)
- 1999: John & Mary (Rounder)
- 2001: Back To The MAC (Rounder)
- 2004: The Best Durn Ride (Chateau)
- 2009: Russell Moore & IIIrd Tyme Out (Rural Rhythm)
- 2011: Prime Tyme (Rural Rhythm)
- 2013: Timeless Hits From the Past Bluegrassed (Cracker Barrel)
- 2015: It's About Tyme (Break A String)

=== With John Cowan ===
- 2006: New Tattoo (Pinecastle)

=== Also appears on ===
- 1995: various artists - Bluegrass '95 (Pinecastle)
- 1996: various artists - Bluegrass '96 (Pinecastle)
- 1996: Beth and April Stevens - Sisters (Rounder)
- 1996: various artists - Bluegrass '97 (Pinecastle)
- 1998: Mark Newton - Living a Dream (Rebel)
- 1998: Suzanne Thomas - Dear Friends & Gentle Hearts (Rounder)
- 1998: various artists - Bluegrass '98 (Pinecastle)
- 1999: Jeff Autry - Foothills (Pinecastle)
- 1999: Chris Jones - Follow Your Heart (Rebel)
- 1999: various artists - Bluegrass '99 (Pinecastle)
- 2000: Scott Vestal - Millennia (Pinecastle)
- 2000: various artists - Bluegrass 2000 (Pinecastle)
- 2001: Scott Anderson - Rivers (Mato Music)
- 2001: Mike Burns - Walk the Water's Edge (North Co)
- 2001: Sally Jones - Love Hurts (self-released)
- 2001: Randy Kohrs - Crack in My Armour (Junction)
- 2001: Ramona Church Taylor - Carolina Memories (Pinecastle)
- 2001: various artists - Bluegrass 2001 (Pinecastle)
- 2002: Kristin Scott Benson - Straight Paths (Pinecastle)
- 2002: Jim Hurst - Second Son (Pinecastle)
- 2002: Chris Jones - Few Words (Rebel)
- 2004: Becky Buller - Little Bird (Bell Buckle)
- 2007: Larry Cordle and Lonesome Standard Time - Took Down and Put Up (Lonesome Day)
- 2007: Tom T Hall - Sings Dixie & Tom T. (Blue Circle)
- 2007: Donna Hughes - Gaining Wisdom (Rounder)
- 2009: Kristin Scott Benson - Second Season (Pinecastle)
- 2012: Robert Hale - Pure & Simple (Pinecastle)
- 2013: Willie Nelson - To All the Girls... (Legacy)
- 2013: various artists - Roanoke: The Music of Bill Monroe (Pinecastle) - track 1, "Louisville Breakdown"
- 2014: Dave Adkins - Nothing to Lose (Mountain Fever)
- 2014: Larry Cordle and Lonesome Standard Time - All-Star Duets (MightyCord)

=== Music instruction ===
- 2004: Wayne Benson - A Mandolin Anthology DVD (Acutab)
