= Jerry Douglas =

American bluegrass musician (born 1956)

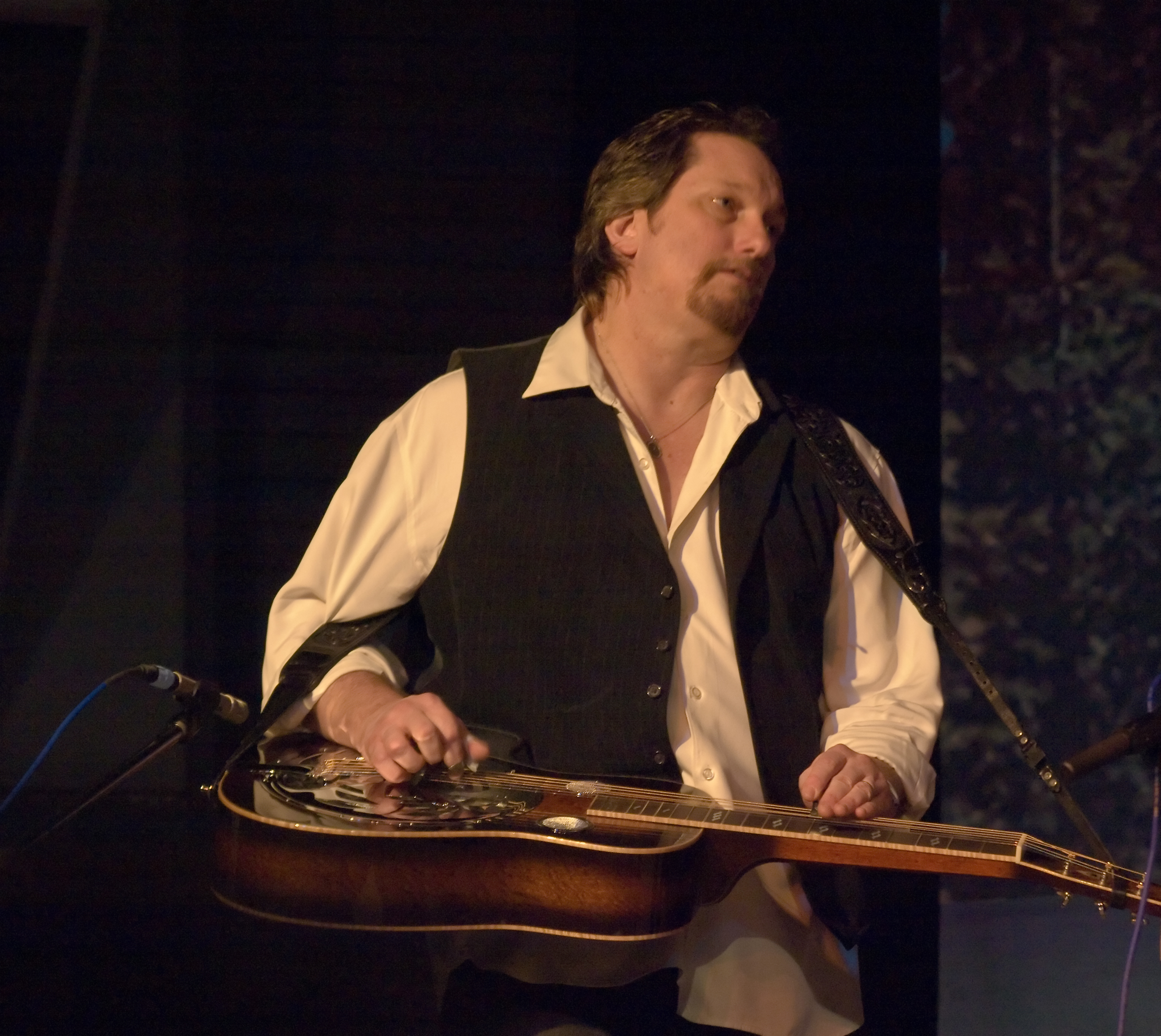
- Douglas in 2009

Background information
- Born: Gerald Calvin Douglas; May 28, 1956 (age 70); Warren, Ohio, U.S.
- Genres: Americana, bluegrass, country
- Occupation: Musician
- Instruments: Dobro, resonator guitar, lap steel guitar, guitar
- Years active: 1970s–present
- Labels: Rounder, MCA, Sugar Hill, Entertainment One, Koch
- Member of: Alison Krauss & Union Station
- Formerly of: The GrooveGrass Boyz
- Website: jerrydouglas.com

Gerald Calvin Douglas (born May 28, 1956) is an American Dobro and lap steel guitar player and record producer. He is widely regarded as "perhaps the finest Dobro player in contemporary acoustic music and certainly the most celebrated and prolific". A 14-time Grammy winner, he has been called "Dobro's matchless contemporary master" by The New York Times. He has recorded and performed both as a solo artist and member of numerous bands such as Alison Krauss and Union Station and The Earls of Leicester. He has been a co-director of the Transatlantic Sessions since 1998.

Douglas was inducted into the International Bluegrass Music Hall of Fame in 2024.

== Career ==
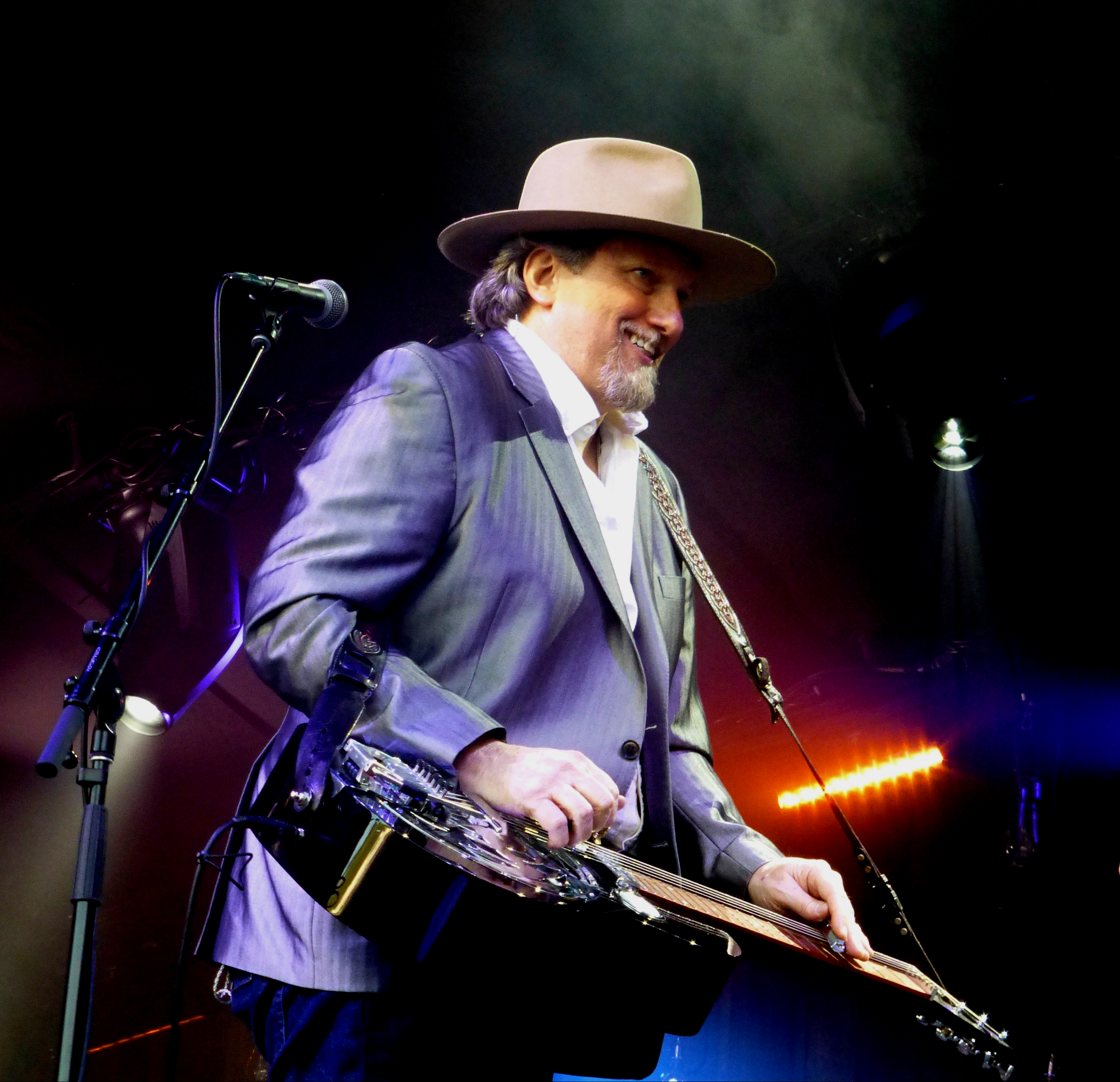
Watson Stage - MerleFest 2018

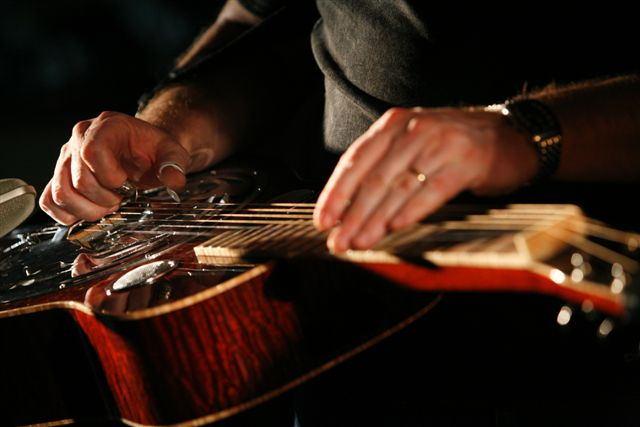
Douglas playing one of his resonator guitars

In addition to his fourteen solo recordings, Douglas has played on more than 1,600 albums. As a sideman, he has recorded with artists as diverse as Garth Brooks, Ray Charles, Eric Clapton, Phish, Dolly Parton, Susan Ashton, Paul Simon, Mumford & Sons, Keb' Mo', Ricky Skaggs, Elvis Costello, Tommy Emmanuel, James Taylor, Johnny Mathis and Molly Tuttle as well as performing on the O Brother, Where Art Thou? soundtrack and the follow-up "Down From the Mountain" tour with Alison Krauss and Union Station. He has collaborated with various groups including The Whites, New South, The Country Gentlemen, Strength in Numbers, and Elvis Costello's "Sugar Canes".

From 1996 to 1998, Douglas was a member of The GrooveGrass Boyz.

Douglas produced a number of records, including some at Sugar Hill Records. He oversaw albums by Alison Krauss, the Del McCoury Band, Maura O'Connell, Jesse Winchester and the Nashville Bluegrass Band, The Earls of Leicester, Gary Morris, The Steep Canyon Rangers. Along with Aly Bain, he serves as Music Director of the popular BBC Television series, "Transatlantic Sessions".

Since 1998, Douglas has been a member of Alison Krauss and Union Station, touring extensively and playing on a series of platinum-selling albums. When not on the road with Alison Krauss and Union Station, Douglas tours in support of his extensive body of work with his bands The Jerry Douglas Band and The Earls of Leicester, following the continued success of the latter's 2014 release The Earls of Leicester and 2015's Rattle and Roar.

Douglas appeared with Vince Gill on Eric Clapton's Crossroads Guitar Festival 2004 ("Oklahoma Borderline" and "What the Cowgirls Do").

Douglas also made a cameo in the third "United Breaks Guitars" consumer protest video, all of which went viral.

On October 31, 2024, Douglas appeared on stage for two nights to perform multiple songs with Billy Strings for the 2024 Billyween O Brother, Where Art Thou? themed concerts in Baltimore, Maryland.

== Personal life ==
Douglas was born in Warren, Ohio, and now lives in Nashville, Tennessee with his wife, Jill.

== Awards and honors ==
As of 2021, Douglas has been nominated for thirty-two Grammy Awards, winning fourteen.

He has received the Country Music Association's 'Musician of the Year' award three times, in 2002, 2005 and 2007.

Douglas is a 10-time recipient of the International Bluegrass Music Association ("IBMA") Dobro Player of the Year Award.

In 2004, the National Endowment for the Arts awarded Douglas a National Heritage Fellowship, which is the United States' highest honor in the folk and traditional arts.

Douglas was named Artist in Residence for the Country Music Hall of Fame and Museum in 2008.

Douglas was honored at the 36th annual Telluride Bluegrass Festival in Colorado for his twenty-fifth consecutive year playing in and at the festival.

Douglas received the Bluegrass Star Award, presented by the Bluegrass Heritage Foundation of Dallas, Texas, on October 15, 2016. The award is bestowed upon bluegrass artists who do an exemplary job of advancing traditional bluegrass music and bringing it to new audiences while preserving its character and heritage.

The Americana Music Association honored Douglas with a Lifetime Achievement Award in 2011.

Douglas received the key to the city of Manchester, Tennessee, as well as to Coffee County during a performance at the 2015 Bonnaroo Music and Arts Festival.

== Discography ==
=== Studio recordings ===
Title	Details	Peak chart positions "—" denotes releases that did not chart					
Title	Details	US Grass	US Country	US	US Heat	US Indie	US New Age
Fluxology	Release date: 1979; Label: Rounder	—	—	—	—	—	—
Fluxedo	Release date: 1982; Label: Rounder	—	—	—	—	—	—
Under the Wire	Release date: 1986; Label: MCA	—	—	—	—	—	—
Changing Channels	Release date: 1987; Label: MCA	—	—	—	—	—	—
Plant Early	Release date: 1989; Label: MCA	—	—	—	—	—	—
Slide Rule	Release date: 1992; Label: Sugar Hill	—	—	—	—	—	—
Restless on the Farm	Release date: May 19, 1998; Label: Sugar Hill	—	—	—	—	—	—
Lookout for Hope	Release date: May 7, 2002; Label:Sugar Hill	10	—	—	—	—	5
The Best Kept Secret	Release date: September 20, 2005; Label: Koch	3	—	—	—	—	—
Glide	Release date: August 19, 2008; Label: Koch	4	69	—	—	—	—
Jerry Christmas	Release date: October 13, 2009; Label: Koch	7	—	—	—	—	—
Traveler	Release date: June 26, 2012; Label: Koch	1	—	168	3	29	—
What If	Release date: August 18, 2017; Label: Rounder	1	—	—	—	—	—

=== Compilations ===
Title	Details
Everything Is Gonna Work Out Fine	Release date: 1987; Label: Rounder; Compilation of Fluxology (1979) and Fluxedo (1982) on one CD
Best of the Sugar Hill Years	Release date: March 13, 2007; Label:Sugar Hill

=== Other recordings ===
- Remembrances and Forecasts 1974 as The Country Gentlemen
- J.D. Crowe & The New South 1975 as J. D. Crowe & the New South
- Holiday In Japan 1975 as J. D. Crowe & the New South
- New South Live 1975 as J. D. Crowe & the New South
- Boone Creek 1977 as Boone Creek
- One Way Track 1977 as Boone Creek
- That Down Home Feeling 1977 as Buck White & Down Home Folks
- Buck and Family Live 1979 as Buck White & Down Home Folks
- More Pretty Girls Than One 1979 as Buck White & Down Home Folks
- Bluegrass Album, Vol. 3 – California Connection 1983 as Bluegrass Album Band
- Snakes Alive 1984 as Dreadful Snakes
- Bluegrass Album Vol.4 1985 as Bluegrass Album Band
- High Country Snows 1985 Dan Fogelberg
- T-Bone Burnett 1986 with T Bone Burnett
- Bluegrass Album, Vol. 5 – Sweet Sunny South 1989 as Bluegrass Album Band
- The Telluride Sessions 1989 as Strength in Numbers
- Will the Circle Be Unbroken: Volume Two 1990 with the Nitty Gritty Dirt Band
- Skip, Hop & Wobble 1993 as Barenberg, Douglas & Meyer
- Toolin' Around "Let it Slide" with Arlen Roth and Sam Bush 1993
- The Great Dobro Sessions 1994 as Jerry Douglas and various artists, produced by Jerry Douglas
- Far From Enough 1994 with Viktor Krauss
- Bluegrass Album, Vol. 6 – Bluegrass Instrumentals 1996 as Bluegrass Album Band
- Bourbon & Rosewater 1996 as Bhatt, Douglas & Meyer
- Yonder 1996 with Peter Rowan
- Signs of Life 1996 Steven Curtis Chapman
- Leading Roll 1997 with Sammy Shelor
- The View From Here 1999 with Matt Flinner
- The Bluegrass Sessions: Tales from the Acoustic Planet, Vol. 2 1999 with Béla Fleck
- O Brother, Where Art Thou? 2000 with Alison Krauss, The Whites, as Soggy Bottom Boys
- Latitude 2001, with Matt Flinner
- Lucky Man (Hal Ketchum album) 2001, with Hal Ketchum
- I Don't Need the Whiskey Anymore 2002, with Jack Lawrence
- Deja Vu (All Over Again) 2004 with John Fogerty
- All I Really Want For Christmas 2005 Steven Curtis Chapman
- Secret, Profane, & Sugarcane 2009 with Elvis Costello and the Sugarcanes
- Southern Filibuster: The Songs of Tut Taylor 2010, produced by Jerry Douglas
- Rounder Records 40th Anniversary Concert 2010 as Jerry Douglas with Bela Fleck, Alison Krauss & Union Station
- Get Low Original Motion Picture Soundtrack 2010 as Jerry Douglas
- "The Boxer", with Paul Simon and Mumford & Sons on the latter's album Babel (released September 2012) and on Douglas's own Traveler, produced by Russ Titelman (released June 2012)
- "One Light Shining" by Ruth Moody from These Wilder Things 2013
- The Earls of Leicester 2014 with The Earls of Leicester produced by Jerry Douglas
- Three Bells 2014 with Mike Auldridge and Rob Ickes produced by Jerry Douglas
- Radio 2015 with The Steep Canyon Rangers produced by Jerry Douglas
- Rattle & Roar 2016 with The Earls of Leicester produced by Jerry Douglas
- "Love Like Me" and "Everything's The Same" from Billy Strings' album Home, released 2019
- Leftover Feelings 2021 with John Hiatt, produced by Jerry Douglas and performed with the Jerry Douglas Band
- Native American 1992, with Tony Rice

=== With Alison Krauss or Alison Krauss and Union Station ===
- I've Got That Old Feeling (Producer And Performer) 1991
- Forget About It 1999
- New Favorite 2001
- Live 2002
- Lonely Runs Both Ways 2004
- A Hundred Miles or More: A Collection 2007
- Paper Airplane 2011

== The Transatlantic Sessions ==
- Transatlantic Sessions 3 [Vol.1] (2007) (with Jerry Douglas and various artists)
- Transatlantic Sessions 3 [Vol.2] (2008) (with Jerry Douglas and various artists)
- The Original Transatlantic Sessions [Vol.2] (2008) (with Jay Ungar and various artists)
- The Original Transatlantic Sessions [Vol.3] (2009) (with Jay Ungar and various artists)
- Transatlantic Sessions 4[Vol.1] (2009) (with Jerry Douglas and various artists)
- Transatlantic Sessions 4[Vol.2] (2010) (with Jerry Douglas and various artists)
- Transatlantic Sessions 4[Vol.3] (2010) (with Jerry Douglas and various artists)

== Awards ==
=== Grammy Awards ===
- 1983 Best Country Instrumental Performance: "Fireball" – with The New South
- 1994 Best Bluegrass Album: The Great Dobro Sessions
- 2001 Album of the Year: Oh Brother, Where Art Thou? – various artists
- 2001 Best Country Performance by a Duo or Group: "The Lucky One" – Alison Krauss + Union Station 2001 Best Bluegrass Album: New Favorite – Alison Krauss + Union Station 2002 Best Country Instrumental Performance: "Foggy Mountain Breakdown" with Earl Scruggs 2002 Best Country Instrumental Performance: Earl Scruggs, Gary Scruggs, Randy Scruggs, Steve Martin, Leon Russell, Vince Gill, Jerry Douglas, Glen Duncan, Albert Lee, Paul Shaffer and Marty Stuart – "Foggy Mountain Breakdown"
- 2003 Best Country Instrumental Performance: "Cluck Old Hen" – Alison Krauss + Union Station
- 2003 Best Bluegrass Album: LIVE – Alison Krauss + Union Station
- 2004 Best Country Instrumental Performance: "Earl's Breakdown" – Nitty Gritty Dirt Band Featuring Earl Scruggs, Randy Scruggs, Vassar Clements & Jerry Douglas
- 2006 Best Country Performance By A Duo Or Group With Vocal: "Restless" – Alison Krauss and Union Station
- 2006 Best Country Instrumental Performance: "Unionhouse Branch" – Alison Krauss and Union Station
- 2006 Best Country Album: Lonely Runs Both Ways – Alison Krauss and Union Station
- 2012 Best Bluegrass Album: Paper Airplane – Alison Krauss and Union Station
- 2015 Best Bluegrass Album: The Earls of Leicester – The Earls of Leicester

=== Americana Music Association Awards ===
- 2002 Instrumentalist of the Year
- 2003 Instrumentalist of the Year
- 2011 Lifetime Achievement Award for Instrumentalist

=== CMA Awards ===
- 2002 Musician of the Year
- 2005 Musician of the Year
- 2007 Musician of the Year

=== IBMA (International Bluegrass Music Association) Awards ===
- 1990 Instrumental Performer of the Year – Dobro
- 1991 Instrumental Performer of the Year – Dobro
- 1992 Instrumental Album of the Year – Slide Rule, Jerry Douglas
- 1992 Record Event of the Year – Slide Rule
- 1992 Instrumental Performer of the Year – Dobro
- 1993 Instrumental Performer of the Year – Dobro
- 1994 Instrumental Album of the Year – Skip, Hop & Wobble; Douglas, Barenberg & Meyer
- 1994 Instrumental Performer of the Year – Dobro
- 1995 Instrumental Album of the Year – The Great Dobro Sessions; Mike Auldridge, Curtis Burch, Jerry Douglas, Josh Graves, Rob Ickes, Oswald Kirby, Stacy Phillips, Tut Taylor, Sally Van Meter, Gene Wooten
- 1995 Record Event of the Year – The Great Dobro Sessions
- 1995 Instrumental Performer of the Year – Dobro
- 1997 Album of the Year – True Life Blues—The Songs of Bill Monroe; Sam Bush, Vassar Clements, Mike Compton, Jerry Douglas, Stuart Duncan, Pat Enright, Greg Garing, Richard Greene, David Grier, David Grisman, John Hartford, Bobby Hicks, Kathy Kallick, Laurie Lewis, Mike Marshall, Del McCoury, Ronnie McCoury, Jim Nunally, Scott Nygaard, Mollie O'Brien, Tim O'Brien, Alan O'Bryant, Herb Pedersen, Todd Phillips, John Reischman, Peter Rowan, Craig Smith, Chris Thile, Tony Trischka, Roland White
- 1997 Record Event of the Year – True Life Blues—The Songs of Bill Monroe
- 1997 Instrumental Album of the Year – Bluegrass Instrumentals, Volume 6; The Bluegrass Album Band
- 2001 Album of the Year - "O' Brother, Where Art Thou" Soundtrack -Norman Blake, James Carter & The Prisoners, The Cox Family, Fairfield Four, Emmylou Harris, John Hartford, Chris Thomas King, Alison Krauss, Jerry Douglas, The Peasall Sisters, The Soggy Bottom Boys, Ralph Stanley, The Stanley Brothers, Gillian Welch, The Whites; Mercury/Lost Highway Records
- 2001 Instrumental Performer of the Year – Dobro
- 2002 Instrumental Performer of the Year – Dobro
- 2003 Album of the Year – Alison Krauss + Union Station Live, Alison Krauss + Union Station featuring Jerry Douglas
- 2003 Record Event of the Year – Will The Circle Be Unbroken Vol. III; Nitty Gritty Dirt Band, Matraca Berg, Sam Bush, June Carter Cash, Johnny Cash, Vassar Clements, Iris DeMent, Rodney Dillard, Jerry Douglas, Glen Duncan, Vince Gill, Josh Graves, Jamie Hanna, Emmylou Harris, Taj Mahal, Jimmy Martin, Del McCoury, Robbie McCoury, Ronnie McCoury, Jonathan McEuen, The Nashville Bluegrass Band, Willie Nelson, Tom Petty, Tony Rice, Earl Scruggs, Randy Scruggs, Ricky Skaggs, Doc Watson, Richard Watson, Glenn Worf & Dwight Yoakam
- 2015 Entertainer of the Year - The Earls of Leicester
- 2015 Instrumental Group of the Year - The Earls of Leicester
- 2015 Album of the Year - The Earls of Leicester, Jerry Douglas, producer
- 2015 Gospel Recorded Performance of the Year - "Who Will Sing For Me" - The Earls of Leicester
- 2015 Instrumental Recorded Performance of the Year - The Three Bells - Jerry Douglas, Mike Auldridge, Rob Ickes
- 2015 Dobro Player of the Year - Jerry Douglas
- 2016 Entertainer of the Year - The Earls of Leicester
- 2016 Dobro Player of the Year - Jerry Douglas

=== National Endowment for the Arts ===
- 2004 National Heritage Fellowship

=== Country Music Hall of Fame ===
- 2008 Artist in Residence

Awards
First None recognized before	AMA Instrumentalist of the Year; 2002	Succeeded by Jerry Douglas
Preceded by Jerry Douglas	AMA Instrumentalist of the Year; 2003	Succeeded by Will Kimbrough
