= Russ Barenberg =

American bluegrass musician (born 1950)

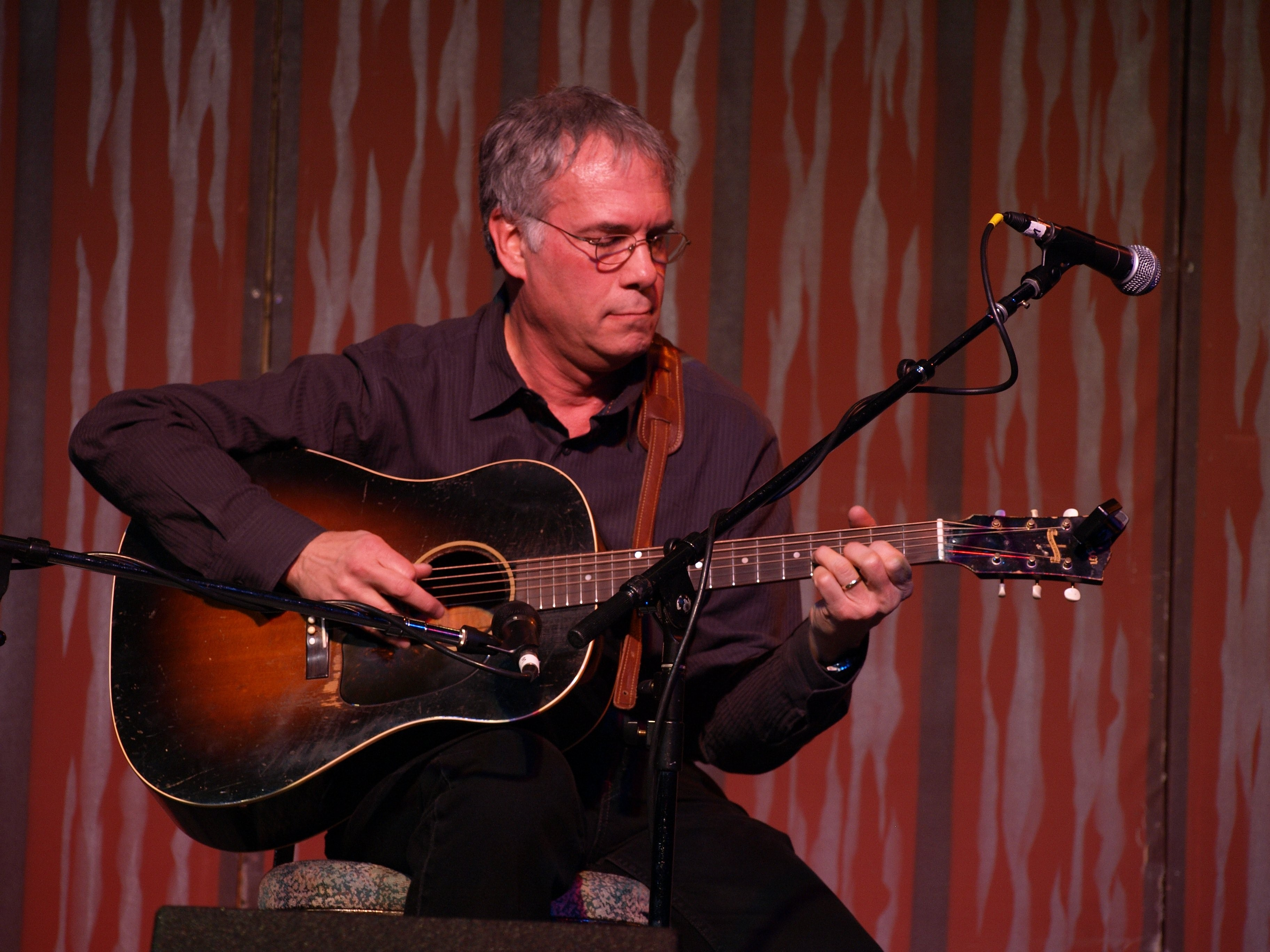
- Barenberg in 2008

Background information
- Born: October 8, 1950 (age 75); U.S.
- Genres: Bluegrass, traditional bluegrass
- Occupations: Musician, composer
- Instruments: Acoustic guitar, mandolin
- Years active: 1970–present
- Labels: Rounder, Compass
- Formerly of: Country Cooking; Heartlands; Fiddle Fever
- Website: russbarenberg.com

Russ Barenberg (born October 8, 1950) is an American bluegrass musician.

== Biography ==
Barenberg began playing guitar at age 13, taking lessons from Alan Miller, whose brother, John Miller, Barenberg would later play with. His style was heavily influenced by the flatpicking technique of Clarence White. He attended Cornell University and met Pete Wernick there in 1968. Together they joined to form Country Cooking, who released two albums of bluegrass before breaking up in 1975.

In 1975 Barenberg briefly began playing electric guitar with a jazz rock group, Carried Away. Late in 1975 he quit playing music, but returned in 1977, moving to New York City to play in the group Heartlands. This group also played backup on Barenberg's debut solo effort, Cowboy Calypso, in 1980. He then moved to Boston, teaching at the Music Emporium in Cambridge. Here he played in the groups Fiddle Fever and Laughing Hands.

In 1986 Barenberg moved to Nashville, where he has played often with Jerry Douglas, Edgar Meyer and Maura O'Connell, and done much work as a session musician with Béla Fleck, Hazel Dickens, Mel Tillis, and Randy Travis, among others. He has released several instructional videos.

Russ Barenberg is one of the most melodic instrumentalists and composers in contemporary bluegrass and acoustic music. Best known for his own unique style of flatpicking, Barenberg often uses his other three fingers to enhance rhythm and melody and create a more textural sensitivity.

In 2007, his song "Little Monk" was nominated for a Grammy Award for Best Country Instrumental Performance. Since 1995 he has been a member of the house band for the Transatlantic Sessions television programs on the BBC.

== Discography ==
=== Solo albums ===
- 1980: Cowboy Calypso (Rounder)
- 1983: Behind the Melodies (Rounder)
- 1988: Moving Pictures (Rounder)
- 2007: When at Last (Compass)

=== Compilations ===
- 1987: Halloween Rehearsal (Rounder)

=== With Country Cooking ===
- 1971: 14 Bluegrass Instrumentals (Rounder)
- 1972: Frank Wakefield with Country Cooking (Rounder)
- 1974: Barrel of Fun (Rounder)
- 1974: Bluegrass Guitar (Music Minus One)

=== With Jerry Douglas and Edgar Meyer ===
- 1993: Skip, Hop and Wobble (Sugar Hill)

=== Also appears on ===
- 1973: Ray Repp - Give Us Peace (K&R / Agápe)
- 1975: John Miller - Let's Go Riding: Country Blues and Old Time Music (Rounder)
- 1977: John Miller - Safe Sweet Home (Rounder)
- 1977: Peter Wernick - Dr. Banjo Steps Out (Flying Fish)
- 1980: Hazel Dickens - Hard Hitting Songs for Hard Hit People (Rounder)
- 1980: Andy Statman - Flatbush Waltz (Rounder)
- 1981: Tony Trischka, Bill Keith, and Béla Fleck - Fiddle Tunes for Banjo (Rounder)
- 1982: Jerry Douglas - Fluxedo (Rounder)
- 1983: Tony Trischka: A Robot Plane Flies over Arkansas (Rounder)
- 1984: Bill Keith - Banjoistics (Rounder)
- 1985: Rodney Miller - Airplang (Rounder)
- 1986: Jerry Douglas - Under the Wire (MCA)
- 1986: Andy Statman - Nashville Mornings New York Nights (Rounder)
- 1987: Hazel Dickens - It's Hard To Tell The Singer From The Song (Rounder)
- 1987: Jerry Douglas - Changing Channels (MCA)
- 1987: Alison Krauss - Too Late to Cry (Rounder)
- 1987: Hugh Moffatt - Loving You (Rounder)
- 1987: Randy Travis - Always & Forever (Warner Bros.)
- 1988: Roy Book Binder - "Bookeroo!" (Rounder)
- 1988: Mark O'Connor - Elysian Forest (Warner Bros.)
- 1988: Jesse Winchester - Humour Me (Sugar Hill)
- 1989: Laurie Lewis - Love Chooses You (Flying Fish)
- 1992: Maura O'Connell - Helpless Heart (Warner Bros.)
- 1990: various artists - The Civil War: Original Soundtrack Recording (Elektra Nonesuch)
- 1991: Randy Travis - High Lonesome (Warner Bros.)
- 1992: Jerry Douglas - Slide Rule (Sugar Hill)
- 1991: Rhonda Vincent - New Dreams and Sunshine (Rebel)
- 1992: Maura O'Connell - Blue Is the Colour of Hope (Warner Bros.)
- 1993: Pete Wernick - On a Roll (Sugar Hill)
- 1994: Kate Mackenzie - Let Them Talk (Red House)
- 1997: Darol Anger - Heritage (Six Degrees)
- 1997: Chris Thile - Stealing Second (Sugar Hill)
- 1998: Jerry Douglas - Restless on the Farm (Sugar Hill)
- 2002: Rhonda Vincent - My Blue Tears (Rebel)
- 2004: Maura O'Connell - Don't I Know (Sugar Hill)
- 2005: Béla Fleck - Crossing the Tracks (Rounder)
- 2006: Bryan Sutton - Not Too Far from the Tree (Sugar Hill)
- 2008: Charlie Haden Family and Friends - Rambling Boy (Decca)
- 2009: Steve Martin - The Crow: New Songs for the 5-String Banjo (Rounder)
- 2009: Bryan Sutton - Almost Live (Sugar Hill)
- 2009: Jesse Winchester - Love Filling Station (Appleseed)
- 2013: Craig Duncan - Blue Suede Bluegrass (Green Hill)
- 2014: Tony Trischka - Great Big World (Rounder)
