= Maura O'Connell =

Irish singer

- O'Connell performing in 2006

Background information
- Born: 16 September 1958 (age 67); Ennis, County Clare, Ireland
- Genres: Folk
- Occupation: Singer
- Years active: 1980–present
- Website: www.mauraoconnell.com

Maura O'Connell (born 16 September 1958) is an Irish singer. She is known for her contemporary interpretations of Irish folk songs, strongly influenced by American country music.

== Background ==
O'Connell was born in Ennis, the main town in County Clare, in the west of Ireland. Born into a musical family, O'Connell was the third of four sisters. Her mother's family owned Costello's fish shop in Ennis where O'Connell worked until music became her full-time career. She grew up listening to her mother's light opera, opera, and parlour song records. Her father's interest leaned towards the rebel ballads. Despite the presence of classical music in the house, O'Connell got very involved in the local folk club scene and together with Mike Hanrahan, who later fronted trad/rock outfit Stockton's Wing, they performed a country music set, as a duo called 'Tumbleweed'.

O'Connell attended St Joseph's Secondary School in Spanish Point from 1971 to 1974, where she took part in the school choir. She was also part of the "Cúl Aodha Choir", led by Peadar Ó Riada, that sang at the funeral of Willie Clancy in 1973.

== Musical career ==
=== Solo career ===
O'Connell began her professional musical journey during a six-week tour of the US in 1980, as vocalist for the traditionally-based Celtic group De Dannan. The following year, she was featured on the band's landmark album, The Star Spangled Molly, (where she has the lead vocals on four tracks) which became something of a national phenomenon in her homeland. However, not long after joining the group she became very interested in the experimental roots music of America's New Grass Revival when the bands' paths crossed, and moved to the US in 1986, settling in Nashville, Tennessee. There she met newgrass pioneers Bela Fleck and Jerry Douglas, with whom she'd work on most of her records.

She recorded her first solo album in 1983, however, it didn't make any impact in Ireland or in the United States. O'Connell received a Grammy nomination for her 1989 album, Helpless Heart (originally released in Ireland in 1987 as Western Highway), which was her first record released under Warner Bros. Records. A Real Life Story (1991), and Blue Is the Colour of Hope (1992), registered a move toward a pop synthesis. O'Connell's versions of "Living in These Troubled Times" and Cheryl Wheeler's "Summerfly" became standout tracks on the 1993 album A Woman's Heart, on four all-female overseas tours and on the 1994 follow-up album in her homeland. A Woman's Heart Vol. 2 features her heartfelt renditions of Nanci Griffith's "Trouble in the Fields" and Gerry O'Beirne's "Western Highway." After numerous album heavily inspired by American newgrass music, O'Connell returned to her Irish roots with the 1997 release, Wandering Home.

As the new millennium approached, O'Connell signed with the Sugar Hill label in late 2000 and began working on her seventh album. Instead of working with her longtime producer Jerry Douglas, O'Connell had Ray Kennedy (who worked with Steve Earle, Lucinda Williams) produce Walls and Windows, which was released in 2001, and featured an eclectic collection of songs, including work by Kim Richey, Van Morrison, John Prine, Eric Clapton and Patty Griffin. Her 2004 album, Don't I Know, contained musical textures added by everything from fiddles, to clavinets, to lap steel and B-3 organ.

In 2009, Maura released her first a cappella album, Naked With Friends. Guest vocalists on the album included Mary Black, Paul Brady, Moya Brennan, Jerry Douglas, Alison Krauss, Mairéad Ní Mhaonaigh, Tim O'Brien, Dolly Parton, Sarah Dugas, Kate Rusby and Darrell Scott. The album was nominated for a Grammy Award.

In 2013 O'Connell announced the end of her solo career.

=== Other work ===
In addition to her solo work, O'Connell has collaborated with a number of Celtic, folk, pop and country artists, including Van Morrison, Brian Kennedy, Moya Brennan, Mary Black, John Prine, Jerry Douglas, Tim O'Brien, John Gorka, Bela Fleck, Robert Earl Keen, Dolly Parton and Shawn Colvin. She has also sung background vocals for a number of artists, including Van Morrison's 1988 project with the Chieftains, Irish Heartbeat and Stockton's Wing on Take A Chance.

== Acting ==
Aside from the music world, Martin Scorsese cast O'Connell, scruffed up for the role, as an Irish migrant street singer in his 19th-century epic Gangs of New York, released in 2002.

== Discography ==
=== Solo albums ===
- 1983: Maura O'Connell (Ogham)
- 1987: Western Highway (Raglan) reissued in 1989 as Helpless Heart
- 1988: Just in Time (Polydor)
- 1989: Always (Polydor)
- 1991: A Real Life Story (Warner Bros.)
- 1992: Blue Is the Colour of Hope (Warner Bros.)
- 1995: Stories (Hannibal)
- 1997: Wandering Home (Hannibal)
- 2001: Walls & Windows (Sugar Hill)
- 2004: Don't I Know (Sugar Hill)
- 2009: Naked With Friends (Sugar Hill)

=== Compilations ===
- 2006: The View From Here: The Very Best Of (Third Floor Music)

=== As primary artist/contributor ===
- 1992: various artists – 'Til Their Eyes Shine... The Lullaby Album (Columbia) – track 3, "Dún Do Shúile"
- 1997: various artists – Gaelforce: Live Concert of the Greatest Irish Artists (Celtic) – track 1-06, "Maggie"
- 1997: various artists – Warmer for the Spark – The Songs of Jimmy MacCarthy: Volume One (Tara) – track 4, "Mystic Lipstick"; track 13, "Love Divine"
- 1998: various artists – The FolkScene Collection – From the Heart of Studio A (Red House) – track 9, "Hit The Ground Running"
- 2002: various artists – Gangs of New York: Music from the Miramax Motion Picture (Interscope) – track 14, "Unconstant Lover"
- 2006: various artists – A Case for Case: A Tribute to the Songs of Peter Case (Hungry For Music) – track 1-02, "Blue Distance"

=== Also appears on ===
- 1980: Stockton's Wing – Take a Chance (Tara)
- 1981: De Danann All Stars – The Star Spangled Molly (Ogham)
- 1983: De Danann – Song for Ireland (Tara) – vocals on track 9, "The Chicken Reel"
- 1985: De Danann – Anthem (Tara) – vocals on track 2, "Let It Be"
- 1986: Johnny "C" – Soul'd Out! (Sugar Hill)
- 1987: Nanci Griffith – The Last of the True Believers (Philo) – vocals on track 5, "Banks of the Pontchartrain"
- 1988: Peter Rowan and the Nashville Bluegrass Band – New Moon Rising (Sugar Hill) – vocals on track 10, "Meadow Green"
- 1988: Van Morrison and The Chieftains – Irish Heartbeat (Mercury) – vocals on track 10, "Marie's Wedding"
- 1990: Rosanne Cash – Interiors (Columbia Records) – vocals on track 2, "Dance With the Tiger"
- 1992: Jerry Douglas – Slide Rule (Sugar Hill)
- 1993: Kukuruza – Crossing borders (Sugar Hill) – vocals on track 3, "Gornitsa"
- 1993: Robert Earl Keen – A Bigger Piece of Sky (Sugar Hill)
- 2001: Tim O'Brien – Two Journeys (Howdy Skies) – vocals on track 7, "The Holy Well"
- 2001: Dolly Parton – Little Sparrow (Sugar Hill) – vocals on track 11, "Down from Dover"
- 2005: Ciaran Tourish – Down The Line (Compass) – vocals on track 9, "Slán Le Máigh"
- 2014: Malcolm Holcombe – The RCA Sessions (Proper)
- 2015: Tom Russell – The Rose of Roscrae (Frontera)
