= List of Doyle Lawson & Quicksilver band members =

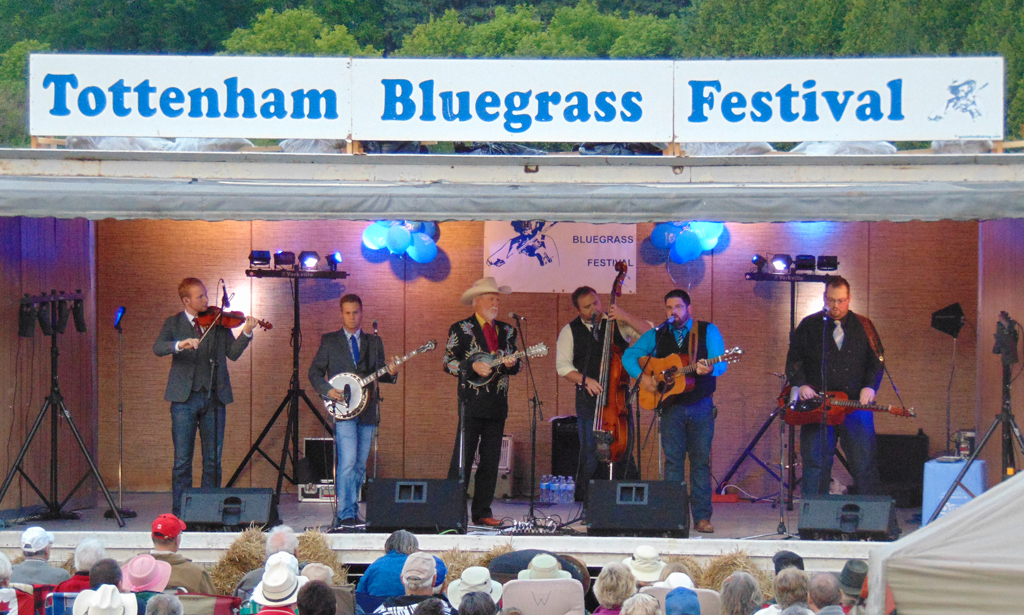
Doyle Lawson & Quicksilver in 2015.

Doyle Lawson, a mandolin player and vocalist from Sneedville, Tennessee, formed his backing band Quicksilver in April 1979. The original lineup featured guitarist and lead vocalist Jimmy Haley, banjo player Terry Baucom, and bassist Lou Reid. During its initial 42-year existence, the group went through numerous changes in personnel. The final lineup at the point of Lawson's retirement from touring in 2021 included banjo player and vocalist Eli Johnston (2013–2018 and 2020–2021), fiddle player Stephen Burwell (2014–2020 and 2021), bassist Jerry Cole (2018–2021), fiddle player Matt Flake (2020–2021), and guitarist Ben James (2020–2021). In August 2026, Lawson announced that the band had reformed for sporadic performances and new recordings, with a lineup of John Meador on guitar and lead vocals, Aubrey Haynie on fiddle, and the returning Josh Swift on dobro, bass and percussion.

== History ==
=== 1979–1991 ===
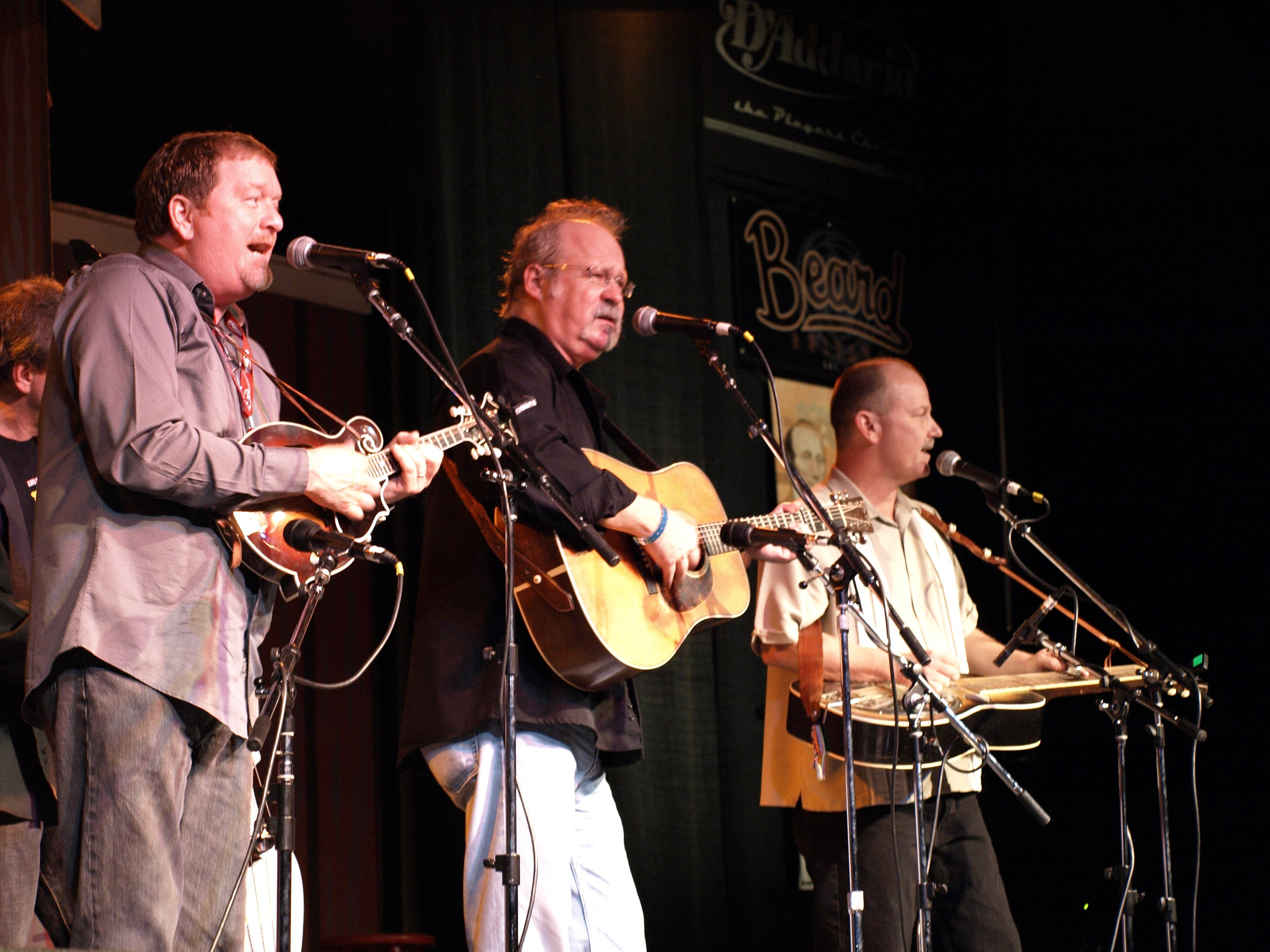
Lou Reid was the first bassist in Doyle Lawson & Quicksilver, performing on three albums.

After more than seven years as a member of The Country Gentlemen, mandolin player and vocalist Doyle Lawson founded his own group on April 1, 1979. The original lineup included guitarist and vocalist Jimmy Haley, banjo player Terry Baucom, and bassist Lou Reid; the group was briefly known as Doyle Lawson & Foxfire, but was soon renamed Doyle Lawson & Quicksilver (DL&Q). After recording three albums — Doyle Lawson & Quicksilver, Rock My Soul and Quicksilver Rides Again — Reid left to join Ricky Skaggs' band on June 1, 1982. He was replaced by Randy Graham for the recording of Heavenly Treasures (1983) and Once and for Always (1985).

In May 1985, all three Quicksilver members left the band due to "business disputes" with Lawson, forming a group called The New Quicksilver with Alan Bibey on mandolin. This left Lawson to enlist a whole new lineup for DL&Q, which consisted of guitarist and vocalist Russell Moore, plus brothers Scott (on banjo) and Curtis Vestal (on bass). After the release of Beyond the Shadows, Ray Deaton took over on bass. This lineup released The News Is Out and Heaven's Joy Awaits in 1987, and Hymn Time in the Country and I'll Wander Back Someday in 1988. Scott Vestal also left in September 1988 to form Livewire, a new group with New South guitarist Robert Hale. He was replaced by Jim Mills, who debuted on the 1989 release I Heard the Angels Singing. The band was joined by Mike Hartgrove as its first full-time fiddler in 1990.

=== 1991–2003 ===
In February 1991, all but Mills left Lawson's band to form IIIrd Tyme Out. Moore and Deaton were replaced by John Bowman and Shelton Feazell, respectively, from 1991 to 1992. Fiddles were performed on the four albums released during this period — Only God, Merry Christmas from Our House to Your House, Pressing On Regardless, and Treasures Money Can't Buy — by session member Jimmy Edmonds. For 1994's Hallelujah in My Heart, Lawson was joined by guitarist and vocalist Shawn Lane, banjo player Brad Campbell, bassist Johnny Berry, and dobro player Jimmy Stewart. The whole lineup changed again after this release, with guitarist and vocalist Steve Gulley, banjo player Barry Abernathy, bassist Dale Perry, and fiddle player Owen Saunders recording Never Walk Away and There's a Light Guiding Me.

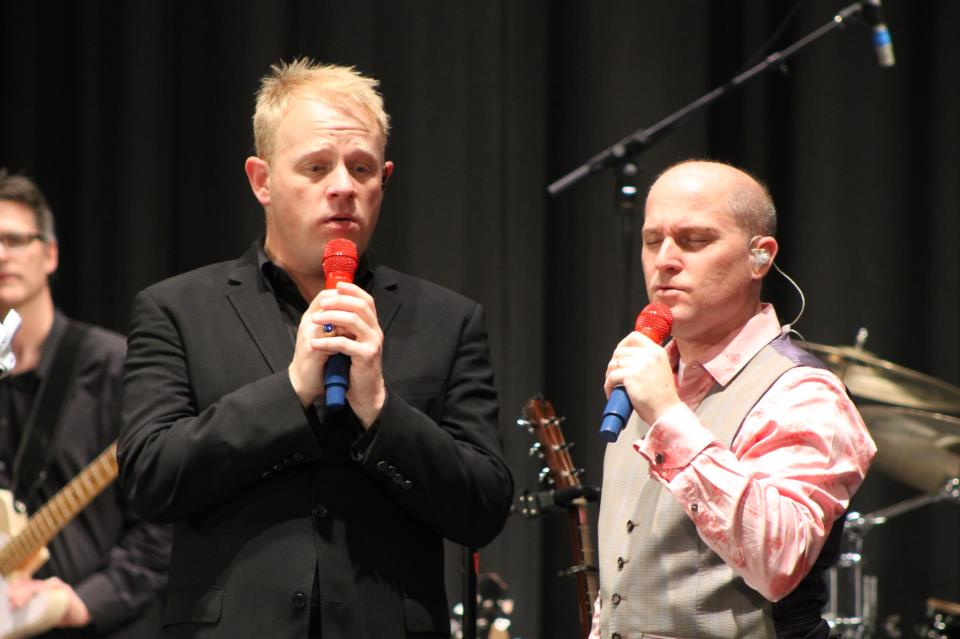
Jamie Dailey played with Quicksilver from 1999 to 2007, first on bass and later on guitar.

During 1996, Gulley was replaced by Barry Scott. After the release of Kept & Protected, Saunders was replaced by Jim Van Cleve. Gospel Radio Gems followed, before Abernathy and Van Cleve left at the end of 1998 to form Mountain Heart. Early the next year, Jamie Dailey joined on bass, Perry switched to banjo, and Doug Bartlett took over on fiddle. After the release of Winding Through Life (1999) and Just Over in Heaven (2000), Bartlett was replaced by 17-year-old Hunter Berry in March 2001. Scott and Dailey subsequently switched guitar and bass duties. Berry left less than a year later, joining Rhonda Vincent's group The Rage in January 2002. He was replaced for a few months by Tom Brantley, before Jesse Stockman took over in the summer. Stockman's bandmate Jess Barry followed in December, making Quicksilver a dual-fiddle lineup.

=== 2003–2013 ===
In July 2003, after the release of Thank God, Dale Perry left DL&Q to join David Parmley's band Continental Divide. He was replaced by original member Terry Baucom. During 2004, the band recorded You Gotta Dig a Little Deeper with Stockman as its sole fiddle player. In August 2005, he joined The Isaacs and was replaced by another returning member, Mike Hartgrove. At the end of the year, Barry Scott also left, reporting that he was "burnt out on music and needs a change". Darren Beachley took over starting on January 1, 2006. He Lives in Me and More Behind the Picture Than the Wall followed, before both Baucom and Hartgrove ended their second tenures in the band on March 17, 2007.

Baucom and Hartgrove were replaced by Chris Warner and Alan Johnson, respectively. Warner was unable to commit full-time, however, and was replaced in June by Joey Cox. April saw the addition of Ron Spears on bass, in preparation for Dailey's planned departure at the end of the year. By August, Spears had been replaced by Carl White, as Dailey completed his departure. In October, the group added a new dobro player, Josh Swift. With its almost entirely new lineup, DL&Q released Help Is on the Way in 2008, before Johnson left that May to take a break from music. He was replaced by Brandon Godman, who performed on Lonely Street before leaving again just six months later. Johnson subsequently returned on a temporary basis. In January 2009, Beachley also departed.

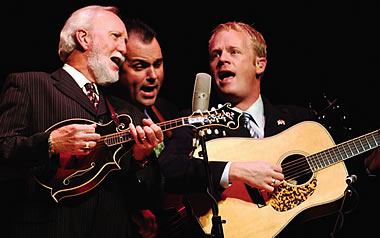
Darren Beachley (center) was one of Quicksilver's lead singers between 2006 and 2009.

In February 2009, Darren McGuire and Jason Barie replaced Beachley and Johnson, respectively. McGuire was replaced by Corey Hensley in September, before Cox and White were replaced in December by returning Perry and new member Jason Leek, respectively. The new lineup released Light on My Feet, Ready to Fly, before Rogers joined as the group's new guitarist in September 2010, with Hensley switching to bass and Leek departing. Starting in January 2011, DL&Q performed with a drummer for the first time, with White returning in this role. The following month, Jessie Baker replaced Perry. He performed on Drive Time and Sing Me a Song About Jesus, before being replaced by Joe Dean in April 2012. Around the same time, the group returned to a six-piece without a drummer, releasing Roads Well Traveled in March 2013.

=== 2013–2021 ===
Both DL&Q lead singers left during 2013 — Mike Rogers was replaced by Dustin Pyrtle in April, before Eli Johnston took over from Corey Hensley in August. The new lineup released Open Carefully, Message Inside, before Barie was replaced by Stephen Burwell in September 2014. The band's lineup remained stable for several years, releasing In Session (2015), Burden Bearer (2016) and Life Is a Story (2017), before Pyrtle and Johnston both left in November 2018 — replaced by Jake Vanover and Jerry Cole, respectively. In 2019, the band released its first ever live album, Live in Prague. The following year saw numerous lineup changes for the group: in January, long-term dobro player Josh Swift left after just over 12 years with the band, in May, Burwell left after just under six years in the lineup, and in June, banjo player Joe Dean left after an eight-year spell with the group.

In July 2020, Lawson revealed that Vanover had followed Swift, Burwell and Dean in leaving the band, explaining that the group's inability to tour due to the COVID-19 pandemic had caused the recent departures. At the same time, he assured that he would continue with new members, revealing a new lineup including continuing bassist Jerry Cole, alongside new guitarist and vocalist Ben James, former bassist Eli Johnston on banjo and vocals, and new fiddle player Matt Flake. The lineup released Roundtable in 2021, which also featured the returning Burwell on second fiddle. That spring, Lawson announced his intention to retire from leading his own band at the end of 2022; however, six months later, he brought this forward a year, explaining that the continued uncertainty in the wake of the pandemic was making it difficult to continue touring. Doyle Lawson & Quicksilver performed their final show on December 30, 2021, at the Jekyll Island Bluegrass Festival on Jekyll Island, Georgia.

Following Lawson's retirement, Eli Johnston, Jerry Cole and Stephen Burwell formed Authentic Unlimited with guitarist John Meador and mandolin player Jesse Brock; Ben James joined the touring lineup of Dailey & Vincent (co-fronted by former DL&Q member Jamie Dailey); and Matt Flake later performed with Sideline and the Bluegrass Allstars.

=== Since 2026 ===
In August 2026, it was announced that Lawson had reformed Quicksilver for sporadic performances and new recordings, with the lineup featuring John Meador on guitar and lead vocals, Lawson on mandolin and backing vocals, Aubrey Haynie on fiddle, Josh Swift on dobro, bass and percussion, and Ben James on tenor vocals.

== Members ==
=== Current ===
Image	Name	Years active	Instruments	Release contributions
	Doyle Lawson	1979–2021; 2016–present	mandolin; mandola; guitar; fiddle (1982–85); banjo; lead, tenor and baritone vocals	all Doyle Lawson & Quicksilver (DL&Q) releases
	Josh Swift	2007–2020; 2026–present	dobro; guitar; percussion; baritone and bass vocals	all DL&Q releases from Help Is on the Way (2008) to Live in Prague (2019); "The Signs" (2026)
	Ben James	2020–2021; 2026–present	guitar; lead and tenor vocals	Roundtable (2021); "The Signs" (2026)
	John Meador	2026–present	guitar; lead vocals	"The Signs" (2026)
	Aubrey Haynie	2026–present	fiddle	"The Signs" (2026)

=== Former ===
Image	Name	Years active	Instruments	Release contributions
	Terry Baucom	1979–1985; 2003–2007 (died 2023)	banjo; fiddle (1982–85); baritone & bass vocals	all DL&Q releases from Doyle Lawson & Quicksilver (1979) to Once and for Always (1985), and from A School of Bluegrass (2004) to More Behind the Picture Than the Wall (2007)
	Jimmy Haley	1979–1985	guitar; lead, baritone & low tenor vocals	all DL&Q releases from Doyle Lawson & Quicksilver (1979) to Once and for Always (1985)
	Lou Reid	1979–1982	bass; lead and tenor vocals	Doyle Lawson & Quicksilver (1979); Rock My Soul (1981); Quicksilver Rides Again (1982); A School of Bluegrass (2004)
	Randy Graham	1982–1985	bass; lead and tenor vocals	Heavenly Treasures (1983); Once and for Always (1985); A School of Bluegrass (2004)
	Russell Moore	1985–1991	guitar; lead and tenor vocals	all DL&Q releases from Beyond the Shadows (1986) to My Heart Is Yours (1990); A School of Bluegrass (2004)
	Scott Vestal	1985–1988	banjo; baritone and low tenor vocals	all DL&Q releases from Beyond the Shadows (1986) to I'll Wander Back Someday (1988); A School of Bluegrass (2004)
	Curtis Vestal	1985–1986	bass; bass vocals	Beyond the Shadows (1986); A School of Bluegrass (2004)
	Ray Deaton	1986–1991 (died 2019)	bass; bass vocals	all DL&Q releases from The News Is Out (1987) to My Heart Is Yours (1990); A School of Bluegrass (2004)
	Jim Mills	1988–1992 (died 2024)	banjo; baritone and low tenor vocals	all DL&Q releases from I Heard the Angels Singing (1989) to Treasures Money Can't Buy (1992); A School of Bluegrass (2004)
	Mike Hartgrove	1989–1991; 2005–2007	fiddle	My Heart Is Yours (1990); A School of Bluegrass (2004); He Lives in Me (2006); More Behind the Picture Than the Wall (2007)
	John Bowman	1991–1992	guitar; bass; lead and tenor vocals	Only God (1991); Merry Christmas from Our House to Your House (1991); Pressing On Regardless (1992); Treasures Money Can't Buy (1992); A School of Bluegrass (2004)
	Shelton Feazell	1991–1992	bass; guitar; bass and low tenor vocals	Only God (1991); Merry Christmas from Our House to Your House (1991); Pressing On Regardless (1992); Treasures Money Can't Buy (1992); A School of Bluegrass (2004)
	Shawn Lane	1992–1994	guitar; lead and tenor vocals	Hallelujah in My Heart (1994); Never Walk Away (1995); A School of Bluegrass (2004)
	Brad Campbell	1992–1994	banjo; baritone and low tenor vocals	Hallelujah in My Heart (1994); Never Walk Away (1995); A School of Bluegrass (2004)
	Jimmy Stewart	1992–1994	dobro; baritone and tenor vocals	Hallelujah in My Heart (1994); Never Walk Away (1995); A School of Bluegrass (2004)
	Johnny Berry	1992–1994	bass; bass vocals	Hallelujah in My Heart (1994); A School of Bluegrass (2004)
	Dale Perry	1994–2003; 2009–2011	bass (until 2003); banjo (from 1999); bass vocals	all DL&Q releases from Never Walk Away (1995) to A School of Bluegrass (2004); Light on My Feet, Ready to Fly (2010)
	Barry Abernathy	1994–1998	banjo; lead,baritone and low tenor vocals	all DL&Q releases from Never Walk Away (1995) to Winding Through Life (1999); The Hard Game of Love (2002); A School of Bluegrass (2004)
	Owen Saunders	1994–1997	fiddle	Never Walk Away (1995); There's a Light Guiding Me (1996); Kept & Protected (1997); The Hard Game of Love (2002); A School of Bluegrass (2004)
	Steve Gulley	1994–1996 (died 2020)	guitar; lead and tenor vocals	Never Walk Away (1995); There's a Light Guiding Me (1996); Kept & Protected (1997); A School of Bluegrass (2004)
	Donny Catron	1996 (died 2016)	guitar; lead and tenor vocals	none
	Barry Scott	1996–2005	guitar; bass (from 2001); piano; lead, tenor and baritone vocals	all DL&Q releases from Kept & Protected (1997) to He Lives in Me (2006)
	Jim Van Cleve	1997–1998	fiddle	Winding Through Life (1999); The Hard Game of Love (2002); A School of Bluegrass
	Jamie Dailey	1999–2007	bass (until 2001); guitar (from 2001); lead, tenor and baritone vocals	all DL&Q releases from Winding Through Life (1999) to More Behind the Picture Than the Wall (2007)
	Doug Bartlett	1999–2001	fiddle; baritone and low tenor vocals	Winding Through Life (1999); Just Over in Heaven (2000); Gospel Parade (2001); A School of Bluegrass (2004)
	Hunter Berry	2001–2002	fiddle; guitar	Gospel Parade (2001); The Hard Game of Love (2002); A School of Bluegrass (2004)
	Tom Brantley	2002	fiddle	none
	Jesse Stockman	2002–2005	fiddle	Thank God (2003); A School of Bluegrass (2004); You Gotta Dig a Little Deeper (2005); He Lives in Me (2006)
	Jess Barry	2002–2004	fiddle	Thank God (2003); A School of Bluegrass (2004)
	Darren Beachley	2005–2009	bass; lead, tenor and baritone vocals	He Lives in Me (2006); More Behind the Picture Than the Wall (2007); Help Is On the Way (2008); Lonely Street (2009)
	Alan Johnson	2007–2008; 2008–2009	fiddle; bass vocals	Help Is on the Way (2008)
	Chris Warner	2007	banjo; baritone vocals	none
	Ron Spears	2007	bass; lead vocals	none
	Joey Cox	2007–2009	banjo; guitar	Help Is on the Way (2008); Lonely Street (2009)
	Carl White	2007–2009; 2011–2012	bass; piano; baritone, low tenor and occasional lead vocals; drums, percussion (2011–12)	Help Is on the Way (2008); Lonely Street (2009); Drive Time (2011); Sing Me a Song About Jesus (2012)
	Brandon Godman	2008	fiddle	Lonely Street (2009)
	Jason Barie	2009–2014	fiddle	all DL&Q releases from Light on My Feet, Ready to Fly (2010) to In Session (2015)
	Darren McGuire	2009	guitar; lead and tenor vocals	none
	Corey Hensley	2009–2013	guitar (until 2010); bass (from 2010); lead, tenor & baritone vocals	Light on My Feet, Ready to Fly (2010); Drive Time (2011); Sing Me a Song About Jesus (2012); Roads Well Traveled (2013)
	Jason Leek	2009–2010	bass; tenor & baritone vocals	Light on My Feet, Ready to Fly (2010)
	Mike Rogers	2010–2013	guitar; percussion; lead, tenor & baritone vocals	Drive Time (2011); Sing Me a Song About Jesus (2012); Roads Well Traveled (2013)
	Jessie Baker	2011–2012	banjo; guitar	Drive Time (2011); Sing Me a Song About Jesus (2012)
	Joe Dean	2012–2020	banjo; guitar	all DL&Q releases from Roads Well Traveled (2013) to Live in Prague (2019)
	Dustin Pyrtle	2013–2018	guitar; lead and tenor vocals	Open Carefully, Message Inside (2014); In Session (2015); Burden Bearer (2016); Life is a Story (2017)
	Eli Johnston	2013–2018; 2020–2021	bass; guitar; banjo (2020–21); lead and baritone vocals	Open Carefully, Message Inside (2014); In Session (2015); Burden Bearer (2016); Life is a Story (2017); Roundtable (2021)
	Stephen Burwell	2014–2020; 2021	fiddle; percussion	all DL&Q releases from In Session (2015) to Roundtable (2021)
	Jerry Cole	2018–2021	bass; guitar; percussion; lead, tenor and baritone vocals	Live in Prague (2019); Roundtable (2021)
	Jake Vanover	2018–2020	guitar; lead, tenor and baritone vocals	Live in Prague (2019)
	Matt Flake	2020–2021	fiddle; bass vocals	Roundtable (2021)

== Lineups ==
Period	Members	Releases
April 1979–June 1982	Doyle Lawson — mandolin, lead,tenor/baritone vocals; Jimmy Haley — guitar, lead,baritone/low tenor vocals; Terry Baucom — banjo, bass vocals; Lou Reid — bass, lead,tenor/baritone vocals	Doyle Lawson & Quicksilver (1979); Rock My Soul (1981); Quicksilver Rides Again (1982)
June 1982–May 1985	Doyle Lawson — mandolin, fiddle, lead,tenor/baritone vocals; Jimmy Haley — guitar, lead,baritone/low tenor vocals; Terry Baucom — banjo, fiddle, bass vocals; Randy Graham — bass, tenor/lead vocals	Heavenly Treasures (1983); Once and for Always (1985)
May 1985 – 1986	Doyle Lawson — mandolin, guitar, lead,tenor/baritone vocals; Russell Moore — guitar, lead/tenor vocals; Scott Vestal — banjo, baritone/low tenor vocals; Curtis Vestal — bass, bass vocals	Beyond the Shadows (1986)
1986–September 1988	Doyle Lawson — mandolin, guitar, lead,tenor/baritone vocals; Russell Moore — guitar, lead/tenor vocals; Scott Vestal — banjo, baritone/low tenor vocals; Ray Deaton — bass, bass vocals	The News Is Out (1987); Heaven's Joy Awaits (1987); Hymn Time in the Country (1988); I'll Wander Back Someday (1988)
September 1988 – 1989	Doyle Lawson — mandolin, guitar, lead,tenor/baritone vocals; Russell Moore — guitar, lead/tenor vocals; Jim Mills — banjo, baritone/low tenor vocals; Ray Deaton — bass, bass vocals	I Heard the Angels Singing (1989)
1989–February 1991	Doyle Lawson — mandolin, guitar, lead,tenor/baritone vocals; Russell Moore — guitar, lead/tenor vocals; Jim Mills — banjo, baritone/low tenor vocals; Ray Deaton — bass, bass vocals; Mike Hartgrove — fiddle	My Heart Is Yours (1990)
Early 1991–late 1992	Doyle Lawson — mandolin, guitar, lead, tenor/baritone vocals; John Bowman — guitar, lead/tenor vocals; Jim Mills — banjo, baritone/low tenor vocals; Shelton Feazell — bass, bass/tenor vocals	Only God (1991); Merry Christmas from Our House to Your House (1991); Pressing On Regardless (1992); Treasures Money Can't Buy (1992)
Late 1992–summer 1994	Doyle Lawson — mandolin, guitar, lead,tenor/baritone vocals; Shawn Lane — guitar, lead/tenor vocals; Brad Campbell — banjo, baritone/low tenor vocals; Johnny Berry — bass, bass vocals; Jimmy Stewart — dobro, baritone/low tenor vocals	Hallelujah in My Heart (1994); Never Walk Away (1995) — two tracks
Summer 1994–1996	Doyle Lawson — mandolin, guitar, lead,tenor/baritone vocals; Steve Gulley — guitar, lead/tenor vocals; Barry Abernathy — banjo, lead, baritone/low tenor vocals; Dale Perry — bass, bass vocals; Owen Saunders — fiddle	Never Walk Away (1995); There's a Light Guiding Me (1996); Kept & Protected (1997) — two tracks
1996	Doyle Lawson — mandolin, guitar, lead,tenor/baritone vocals; Donny Catron — guitar, lead/tenor vocals; Barry Abernathy — banjo,lead, baritone/low tenor vocals; Dale Perry — bass, bass vocals; Owen Saunders — fiddle	none
November 1996 – 1997	Doyle Lawson — mandolin, guitar, lead,tenor/baritone vocals; Barry Scott — guitar, lead/tenor vocals; Barry Abernathy — banjo,lead,baritone/low tenor vocals; Dale Perry — bass, bass vocals; Owen Saunders — fiddle	Kept & Protected (1997); The Hard Game of Love (2002) — two tracks
1997–late 1998	Doyle Lawson — mandolin, guitar, lead,tenor/baritone vocals; Barry Scott — guitar, lead/tenor vocals; Barry Abernathy — banjo, lead,baritone/tenor vocals; Dale Perry — bass, bass vocals; Jim Van Cleve — fiddle	Gospel Radio Gems (1998); The Hard Game of Love (2002) — three tracks
Early 1999–March 2001	Doyle Lawson — mandolin, guitar, lead/baritone vocals; Barry Scott — guitar, piano, lead/tenor vocals; Jamie Dailey- bass, guitar, lead,baritone/low tenor vocals; Dale Perry — banjo, bass, bass vocals'; Doug Bartlett — fiddle, baritone/low tenor vocals	Winding Through Life (1999); Just Over in Heaven (2000); ’’Gospel Parade’’ (2001) 2 tracks
March 2001–January 2002	Doyle Lawson — mandolin, guitar, lead,baritone/low tenor vocals; Barry Scott — bass, piano, guitar, lead,tenor/baritone vocals; Jamie Dailey — guitar, bass lead,tenor/ baritone vocals; Dale Perry — banjo, bass, bass vocals; Hunter Berry — fiddle, guitar	Gospel Parade (2001); The Hard Game of Love (2002) — seven tracks
Early–summer 2002	Doyle Lawson — mandolin, guitar, lead,baritone/low tenor vocals; Barry Scott— bass, piano, guitar, lead/tenor vocals; Jamie Dailey — guitar, bass, lead,tenor/baritone vocals; Dale Perry — banjo, bass, bass vocals; Tom Brantley — fiddle	none
Summer–December 2002	Doyle Lawson — mandolin, guitar, lead,baritone/low-tenor vocals; Barry Scott — bass, piano, guitar, lead,tenor/baritone vocals; Jamie Dailey — guitar, bass, lead,tenor/baritone vocals; Dale Perry — banjo, bass, bass vocals; Jesse Stockman — fiddle	none
December 2002–July 2003	Doyle Lawson — mandolin, guitar, lead,baritone/low tenor vocals; Barry Scott — bass, piano, guitar, lead,tenor/baritone vocals; Jamie Dailey — guitar, bass, lead,tenor/baritone vocals; Dale Perry — banjo, bass, bass vocals; Jesse Stockman — fiddle; Jess Barry — fiddle	Thank God (2003)
August 2003 – 2004	Doyle Lawson — mandolin, guitar, lead,baritone/low tenor vocals; Barry Scott — bass, guitar, lead,tenor/baritone vocals; Jamie Dailey — guitar,bass, lead,tenor/baritone vocals; Terry Baucom — banjo, bass vocals; Jesse Stockman — fiddle; Jess Barry — fiddle	none
2004–August 2005	Doyle Lawson — mandolin, guitar, lead,baritone/low tenor vocals; Barry Scott — bass, guitar, lead,tenor/baritone vocals; Jamie Dailey — guitar, bass, lead,tenor/baritone vocals; Terry Baucom — banjo, bass vocals; Jesse Stockman — fiddle	You Gotta Dig a Little Deeper (2005); He Lives in Me (2006) — select tracks
August–December 2005	Doyle Lawson — mandolin, guitar, lead,baritone/low tenor vocals; Jamie Dailey — guitar, bass lead/tenor vocals; Barry Scott — bass, guitar lead/baritone vocals; Terry Baucom — banjo, bass vocals; Mike Hartgrove — fiddle	He Lives in Me (2006) — select tracks
January 2006–March 2007	Doyle Lawson — mandolin, guitar, lead,baritone/low tenor vocals; Jamie Dailey — guitar, lead,tenor/baritone vocals; Darren Beachley — bass, lead,tenor/baritone vocals; Terry Baucom — banjo, bass vocals; Mike Hartgrove — fiddle	He Lives in Me (2006) — select tracks; More Behind the Picture Than the Wall (2007)
March–April 2007	Doyle Lawson — mandolin, guitar, lead,baritone/low tenor vocals; Jamie Dailey — guitar, lead,tenor/baritone vocals; Darren Beachley — bass, lead,tenor/ baritone vocals; Chris Warner — banjo, baritone vocals; Alan Johnson — fiddle, bass vocals	none
April–June 2007	Doyle Lawson — mandolin, guitar, lead,baritone/low tenor vocals; Jamie Dailey — guitar, lead,tenor/baritone vocals; Darren Beachley — guitar, lead,tenor/baritone vocals; Ron Spears — bass, lead/tenor vocals; Chris Warner — banjo, baritone vocals; Alan Johnson — fiddle, bass vocals	none
June–August 2007	Doyle Lawson — mandolin, guitar, lead,baritone/low tenor vocals; Jamie Dailey — guitar, lead,tenor/baritone vocals; Darren Beachley — guitar, lead,tenor/baritone vocals; Ron Spears — bass, lead/tenor vocals; Joey Cox — banjo, guitar; Alan Johnson — fiddle, bass vocals	none
August–October 2007	Doyle Lawson — mandolin, guitar, lead,baritone/low tenor vocals; Darren Beachley — guitar, lead/tenor vocals; Joey Cox — banjo, guitar; Carl White — bass, lead, baritone/low tenor vocals; Alan Johnson — fiddle, bass vocals	none
October 2007–May 2008	Doyle Lawson — mandolin, guitar, lead,baritone/low tenor vocals; Darren Beachley — guitar, lead/tenor vocals; Joey Cox — banjo, guitar; Carl White — bass, lead,baritone/low tenor vocals; Alan Johnson — fiddle, bass vocals; Josh Swift — dobro, baritone vocals	Help Is on the Way (2008)
June–December 2008	Doyle Lawson — mandolin, guitar, lead,baritone/ low tenor vocals; Darren Beachley — guitar, lead/tenor vocals; Joey Cox — banjo, guitar; Carl White — bass, lead,baritone/low tenor vocals; Brandon Godman — fiddle; Josh Swift — dobro, bass vocals	Lonely Street (2009)
December 2008–January 2009	Doyle Lawson — mandolin, guitar, lead/baritone/low tenor vocals; Darren Beachley — guitar, lead/tenor vocals; Joey Cox — banjo, guitar; Carl White — bass, lead,baritone/low tenor vocals; Alan Johnson — fiddle, bass vocals; Josh Swift — dobro, baritone vocals	none
February–September 2009	Doyle Lawson — mandolin, lead,baritone/low tenor vocals; Darren McGuire — guitar, lead/tenor vocals; Joey Cox — banjo, guitar; Carl White — bass, lead,baritone/low tenor vocals; Jason Barie — fiddle; Josh Swift — dobro, bass vocals	none
September–December 2009	Doyle Lawson — mandolin, guitar, lead,baritone/low tenor vocals; Corey Hensley — guitar, lead/tenor vocals; Joey Cox — banjo, guitar; Carl White — bass,lead,baritone/low tenor vocals; Jason Barie — fiddle; Josh Swift — dobro, bass vocals	none
December 2009–September 2010	Doyle Lawson — mandolin, guitar, lead,baritone/low tenor vocals; Corey Hensley — guitar, lead/tenor vocals; Dale Perry — banjo, guitar, bass vocals; Jason Leek — bass, baritone/low tenor vocals; Jason Barie — fiddle; Josh Swift — dobro, baritone/low tenor vocals	Light on My Feet, Ready to Fly (2010)
September 2010–January 2011	Doyle Lawson — mandolin, guitar, lead,baritone/low-tenor vocals; Mike Rogers — guitar, lead,tenor/baritone vocals; Corey Hensley — bass, lead, tenor/baritone vocals; Dale Perry — banjo, guitar, bass vocals; Jason Barie — fiddle; Josh Swift — dobro, baritone/low tenor vocals	none
January–February 2011	Doyle Lawson — mandolin, guitar,lead,baritone/low tenor vocals; Mike Rogers — guitar, lead,tenor/baritone vocals; Corey Hensley — bass, lead,tenor/baritone vocals; Dale Perry — banjo, guitar, bass vocals; Jason Barie — fiddle; Josh Swift — dobro, baritone/low tenor vocals; Carl White — drums, percussion,bass,lead/baritone vocals	none
February 2011–April 2012	Doyle Lawson — mandolin, guitar,lead,baritone/low tenor vocals; Mike Rogers — guitar, percussion, lead,tenor/baritone vocals; Corey Hensley — bass,guitar,lead,tenor/baritone vocals; Jessie Baker — banjo, guitar; Jason Barie — fiddle; Josh Swift — dobro, guitar, bass, bass vocals; Carl White — drums, bass,lead/baritone vocals	Drive Time (2011); Sing Me a Song About Jesus (2012)
April 2012–April 2013	Doyle Lawson — mandolin, guitar, lead,baritone/low tenor vocals; Mike Rogers — guitar, percussion, lead,tenor/baritone vocals; Corey Hensley — bass, lead,tenor/baritone vocals; Joe Dean — banjo, guitar; Jason Barie — fiddle; Josh Swift — dobro, guitar, bass, bass vocals	Roads Well Traveled (2013)
April–August 2013	Doyle Lawson — mandolin, guitar, lead,baritone/low tenor vocals; Dustin Pyrtle — guitar, lead/tenor vocals; Corey Hensley — bass, lead,tenor/baritone vocals; Joe Dean — banjo, guitar, bass vocals; Jason Barie — fiddle; Josh Swift — dobro, guitar, bass, baritone, low tenor/ bass vocals	none
August 2013–September 2014	Doyle Lawson — mandolin, guitar, lead,baritone/low tenor vocals; Dustin Pyrtle — guitar, lead/tenor vocals; Eli Johnston — bass, lead,baritone/low tenor vocals; Joe Dean — banjo, guitar; Jason Barie — fiddle; Josh Swift — dobro, guitar, bass, baritone/bass vocals	Open Carefully, Message Inside (2014); In Session (2015) – all but one track
September 2014–November 2018	Doyle Lawson — mandolin, guitar, lead,baritone/low tenor vocals; Dustin Pyrtle — guitar, lead/tenor vocals; Eli Johnston — bass, lead,baritone/low tenor vocals; Joe Dean — banjo, guitar; Stephen Burwell — fiddle, percussion; Josh Swift — dobro, guitar, bass, baritone/bass vocals	In Session (2015) – one track; Burden Bearer (2016); Life Is a Story (2017)
November 2018–January 2020	Doyle Lawson — mandolin, guitar, lead,baritone/low tenor vocals; Jake Vanover — guitar, lead,tenor/baritone vocals; Jerry Cole — bass, lead, tenor/baritone vocals; Joe Dean — banjo, guitar; Stephen Burwell — fiddle, percussion; Josh Swift — dobro, guitar, bass, bass vocals	Live in Prague (2019)
January–May 2020	Doyle Lawson — mandolin, guitar, lead,baritone/low tenor vocals; Jake Vanover — guitar, lead,tenor/baritone vocals; Jerry Cole — bass, lead, tenor/ baritone vocals; Joe Dean — banjo, guitar, bass vocals; Stephen Burwell — fiddle, percussion	none
July 2020–summer 2021	Doyle Lawson — mandolin, guitar, lead/baritone vocals; Ben James — guitar, lead/tenor vocals; Eli Johnston — banjo, guitar, lead,baritone/low tenor vocals; Jerry Cole — bass, lead,tenor/ baritone vocals; Matt Flake — fiddle, bass vocals	Roundtable (2021)
Summer–December 2021	Doyle Lawson — mandolin, guitar, lead/baritone vocals; Ben James — guitar, lead/tenor vocals; Eli Johnston — banjo, guitar, lead,baritone/low tenor vocals; Jerry Cole — bass, guitar,lead,tenor/baritone vocals; Matt Flake — fiddle, bass, bass vocals; Stephen Burwell — fiddle, percussion	Roundtable (2021)
Band inactive January 2022–July 2026
August 2026–present	Doyle Lawson — mandolin, baritone vocals; John Meador — guitar, lead vocals; Ben James — guitar, tenor vocals; Aubrey Haynie — fiddle; Josh Swift — dobro, guitar, bass, bass vocals	"The Signs" (2026)
