= Carrie Underwood: Live in Concert =

2006 concert tour by Carrie Underwood

- Tour by Carrie Underwood
- Promotional poster for the tour
- Associated album: Some Hearts
- Start date: April 5, 2006
- End date: October 1, 2006
- No. of shows: 42

Carrie Underwood concert chronology
- Carrie Underwood: Live in Concert (2006); Carnival Ride Tour (2008)

Carrie Underwood: Live in Concert was the first headlining tour for American recording artist, Carrie Underwood. Performing during the spring and summer of 2006, the tour promoted her debut album, Some Hearts. The tour predominantly performed in the United States and Canada, at various music festivals and state fairs.

== Opening acts ==
- Little Big Town (Dixon)
- Michelle Crowley (Cabazon)
- Rio Grand (Fairlea)
- Rockie Lynne (Hamburg)
- Trent Tomlinson (Sedalia)
- Andy Griggs (Geddes, Bloomsburg)
- Jamey Johnson (Hutchinson)

== Setlist ==
1. "We're Young and Beautiful"
2. "That's Where it Is"
3. "Wasted"
4. "Lessons Learned"
5. "Don't Forget to Remember Me"
6. "Inside Your Heaven"
7. "Patience"
8. "Sweet Child O' Mine"
9. "Before He Cheats"
10. "I Just Can't Live a Lie"
11. "The Night Before (Life Goes On)"
12. "Jesus, Take the Wheel"
13. "Some Hearts"

Encore

14. "Whenever You Remember"
15. "I Ain't in Checotah Anymore"

Notes

Underwood has also been known to do covers of Guns N' Roses songs at many of her shows. During the "Live 2006 Tour", she covered the songs "Patience" and "Sweet Child O' Mine", both of which were originally done by the rock band. Underwood has also performed the band's songs "Paradise City" and "November Rain" on numerous occasions, as well.

== Tour dates ==
Date	City	Country	Venue
April 5, 2006^{[A]}	Wilmington	United States	Trask Coliseum
April 7, 2006	Temecula	United States	Pechanga Showroom Theater
April 8, 2006^{[B]}	Florence	United States	Canyon Moon Ranch
May 4, 2006^{[C]}	West Palm Beach	United States	Washington Mutual Stage
May 12, 2006^{[D]}	Dixon	United States	Dixon Fairgrounds
May 13, 2006	Kelseyville	United States	Outdoor Konocti Field Amphitheatre
May 14, 2006	Cabazon	United States	Key Club at Morongo
May 27, 2006^{[E]}	Virginia Beach	United States	5th Street Stage
June 8, 2006^{[F]}	Pryor	United States	Catch the Fever Festival Grounds
June 9, 2006^{[G]}	Comstock	United States	2nd Wind Ranch
June 10, 2006^{[H]}	Nashville	United States	The Coliseum
June 24, 2006^{[I]}	Mack	United States	Country Jam Ranch
June 25, 2006^{[J]}	Cadott	United States	Natural Amphitheater Concert Grounds
July 3, 2006^{[K]}	Del Mar	United States	Harrah's Grandstand Stage
July 6, 2006^{[L]}	Fort Loramie	United States	Hickory Hill Lakes
July 8, 2006^{[M]}	Milwaukee	United States	Marcus Amphitheater
July 9, 2006^{[N]}	Fowlerville	United States	Fowlerville Fair Grandstand
July 15, 2006^{[O]}	Belmont County	United States	The Barn Stage at Plainfield
July 19, 2006^{[B]}	Twin Lakes	United States	Shadow Hill Ranch
July 21, 2006^{[P]}	Madison County	United States	Activity Field at Redstone Arsenal
July 28, 2006^{[Q]}	Minot	United States	ND State Fairgrounds Grandstand
July 29, 2006^{[R]}	Great Falls	United States	Four Seasons Arena
August 2, 2006^{[S]}	Paso Robles	United States	Paso Robles Event Center
August 3, 2006	Fresno	United States	William Saroyan Theatre
August 4, 2006	Murphys	United States	Ironstone Amphitheatre
August 6, 2006^{[T]}	Sweet Home	United States	Sankey Park
August 9, 2006^{[U]}	Sioux Falls	United States	W.H. Lyon Fairgrounds Grandstand
August 12, 2006^{[V]}	Bethlehem	United States	RiverPlace Stage
August 14, 2006^{[W]}	Fairlea	United States	SFWV Grandstand
August 16, 2006^{[X]}	Hamburg	United States	Buffalo.com Grandstand
August 18, 2006^{[Y]}	Sedalia	United States	Pepsi Grandstand
August 22, 2006	Orillia	Canada	Casino Rama Entertainment Centre
August 27, 2006^{[Z]}	Essex	United States	Coca-Cola Grandstand
August 28, 2006^{[AA]}	Syracuse	United States	Mohegan Sun Grandstand
August 30, 2006^{[AB]}	Pueblo	United States	Colorado State Fair Events Center
September 8, 2006^{[AC]}	Albuquerque	United States	Tingley Coliseum
September 9, 2006^{[AD]}	Hutchinson	United States	Kansas State Fair Grandstand
September 12, 2006^{[AE]}	York	United States	Apple Auto Grandstand
September 14, 2006^{[AF]}	Fayetteville	United States	Cumberland County Crown Coliseum
September 17, 2006^{[AG]}	Ridgefield	United States	The Amphitheater at Clark County
September 27, 2006^{[AH]}	Bloomsburg	United States	Bloomsburg Fairgrounds Grandstand
October 1, 2006^{[AI]}	West Springfield	United States	Comcast Arena Stage

Festivals and other miscellaneous performances

^{A} This concert was a part of the "North Carolina Azalea Festival"
^{B} This concert was a part of "Country Thunder"
^{C} This concert was a part of "SunFest"
^{D} This concert was a part of the "Dixon May Fair"
^{E} This concert was a part of the "Virginia Beach Patriotic Festival"
^{F} This concert was a part of the "Country Fever"
^{G} This concert was a part of the "Comstock Windmill Festival"
^{H} This concert was a part of the "CMA Music Festival"
^{I} This concert was a part of the "Country Jam USA"
^{J} This concert was a part of the "Country Fest"
^{K} This concert was a part of the "San Diego County Fair Summer Concert Series"
^{L} This concert was a part of the "Country Concert 26th Annual Music Festival"
^{M} This concert was a part of "Summerfest"
^{N} This concert was a part of the "Fowlerville Family Fair"
^{O} This concert was a part of "Jamboree in the Hills"
^{P} This concert was a part of the "2006 Army Concert Tour"
^{Q} This concert was a part of the "North Dakota State Fair"
^{R} This concert was a part of the "Montana State Fair"
^{S} This concert was a part of the "California Mid-State Fair"
^{T} This concert was a part of the "Oregon Jamboree"
^{U} This concert was a part of the "Sioux Empire Fair"
^{V} This concert was a part of "Musikfest"
^{W} This concert was a part of the "State Fair of West Virginia"
^{X} This concert was a part of the "Erie County Fair"
^{Y} This concert was a part of the "Missouri State Fair"
^{Z} This concert was a part of the "Champlain Valley Fair"
^{AA} This concert was a part of the "Cingular Wireless Concert Series"
^{AB} This concert was a part of the "Colorado State Fair"
^{AC} This concert was a part of the "New Mexico State Fair"
^{AD} This concert was a part of the "Kansas State Fair"
^{AE} This concert was a part of the "York Fair"
^{AF} This concert was a part of the "Cumberland County Fair"
^{AG} This concert was a part of the "Clark County Country Jamboree"
^{AH} This concert was a part of the "Bloomsburg Fair"
^{AI} This concert was a part of the "Eastern States Exposition"

Cancellations and rescheduled shows

July 27, 2006	Cheyenne, Wyoming	Cheyenne Frontier Days Arena	Cancelled. This concert was a part of "Cheyenne Frontier Days"
