= Not Going Under =

2004 album by Maria Arredondo

Studio album by Maria Arredondo
- Released: November 2004
- Recorded: 2004
- Genre: Pop music
- Length: 48:27
- Label: Universal Music

Maria Arredondo chronology
Maria Arredondo (2003)	Not Going Under (2004)	Min Jul (2005)

Not Going Under is the second album by Maria Arredondo, released by Universal Music Norway on November 8, 2004. Three singles were released from the album, which were the first by Arredondo to have music videos.

== Track listing ==
1. "Not Going Under" (Lind / Bjørklund)
2. "Little Bit Better" (Lind / Bjørklund)
3. "Burning" (Laila Samuelsen / Jørn Dahl)
4. "Mad Summer" (Lind / Bjørklund)
5. "Catch Me If I Fall" (Christian Ingebrigtsen)
6. "Riding Out The Storm" (Douglas Carr / Winston Sela)
7. "That Day" (Marion Raven / Ken Ingwersen / Jon Rydningen)
8. "Some Hearts" (Diane Warren)
9. "Wasted Tears" (Johan Bobäck / Joachim Nilsson / Sarah Godden)
10. "Remedy" featuring Espen Lind (Lind / Bjørklund)
11. "Cross Every River" (Johan Bobäck / Joachim Nilsson / Sarah Godden)
12. "Mona Lisa Eyes" (Douglas Carr / Randy Goodrum / Michael Saxell
13. "With Hope" (Steven Curtis Chapman)
