= Some Hearts (song) =

1989 single by Marshall Crenshaw

Single by Marshall Crenshaw

from the album Good Evening
- B-side: "Whatever Way the Wind Blows"
- Released: 1989
- Recorded: 1989
- Genre: Power pop, folk rock
- Length: 4:22
- Label: Warner Bros. Records
- Songwriter: Diane Warren
- Producer: David Kershenbaum

"Some Hearts" is a song written by Diane Warren. The track was originally written for Belinda Carlisle, who recorded it as a demo for her 1987 Heaven on Earth album, but it was not included on the album. It was released as a single by Marshall Crenshaw from his 1989 album, Good Evening, but it failed to chart. Singers that have covered the song include Kelly Levesque, featured in the 2001 film America's Sweethearts, Maria Arredondo for her 2004 album Not Going Under, and Carrie Underwood for her debut album of the same name.

== Background ==
Marshall Crenshaw released the first version of "Some Hearts" on his 1989 album Good Evening. The album was Crenshaw's last for Warner Bros. Pessimistic about the album's fate, he sought outside songwriters; he recalled, "I didn’t want to write any songs for the album, because I had very little faith and I couldn't get myself to make that kind of commitment to the record. I decided to save my energy."

Crenshaw recalled that performing a Warren song was "a little bit strange, but I was really charmed by it." The song features David Lindley on fiddle; Crenshaw stated, "We did sort of sabotage it, turned it into a hillbilly song." Crenshaw also made some changes to the lyrics, angering Warren:

I made a couple of changes in the lyrics, and she was really angry at me for doing it. I was on Diane Warren’s (bad) list. I figure you have a license to do that when you record a song.

== Carrie Underwood version ==
"Some Hearts"

Single by Carrie Underwood

from the album Some Hearts
- Released: November 7, 2005
- Studio: Blackbird Studio (Nashville, TN); Sound Kitchen Studios (Franklin, TN); Sound Stage Studios (Nashville, TN)
- Genre: Country pop
- Length: 3:48
- Label: Arista
- Songwriter: Diane Warren
- Producer: Dann Huff

Carrie Underwood singles chronology
"Jesus, Take the Wheel" (2005)	"Some Hearts" (2005)	"Don't Forget to Remember Me" (2006)

In 2005, it was recorded by Carrie Underwood as the title track of her debut album, Some Hearts, and was the album's second single. It was only released to pop and adult contemporary radio in the United States in November 2005, around the same time that "Jesus, Take the Wheel" was released to country radio. "Some Hearts" peaked at number 12 on the Billboard Adult Contemporary chart and reached number 22 on the Adult Top 40 chart. The song had no accompanying music video and was not released to country radio. It has sold over 207,000 copies in US as of February 2010.

Underwood performed the song at the 2005 Billboard Music Awards, the half-time of the 2006 NBA All-Star Game in Houston, on an episode of The Ellen DeGeneres Show and during her promotional tour for the album's release. The song was used in early commercials for American Idol's website during the sixth season of the show, until Daughtry's "Home" was used after Hollywood week.

=== Critical reception ===
Scott Shetler of Slant Magazine wrote in his review of the album that " Underwood is likely to become a fixture on the country charts for the next year with songs like the uptempo title track, a smash hit in the making that is equal parts Jo Dee Messina and SHeDAISY." Stephen Thomas Erlewine wrote that Underwood sounds equally convincing on such sentimental fare as "Jesus, Take the Wheel" as on the soaring pop "Some Hearts".

=== Chart performance ===
==== Weekly charts ====
Chart (2005–06)	Peak position
Canada AC Top 30 (Radio & Records)	21
US Adult Contemporary (Billboard)	12
US Adult Pop Airplay (Billboard)	22

==== Year-end charts ====
Chart (2006)	Peak position
US Adult Contemporary (Billboard)	24

=== Release history ===
Release dates and formats for "Some Hearts"
Region	Date	Format	Label	Ref.
United States	November 7, 2005	Contemporary hit radio	Arista	

== Cover versions ==
In 2001, the song was covered by Kelly Levesque for the soundtrack for America's Sweethearts and in 2004 by Maria Arredondo for her second studio album, Not Going Under.
