= Live 2006 =

Live 2006 may refer to:

- 2006 Live live album by the Danish progressive metal band Royal Hunt
- Carrie Underwood: Live 2006 first concert tour by American country singer, Carrie Underwood
- Ringo Starr & His All Starr Band Live 2006
