= Some Hearts =

Studio album by Carrie Underwood
- Released: November 15, 2005
- Studios: Starstruck (Nashville, TN); The Plant (Sausalito, CA); Electrokitty (Seattle, WA); The Sound Kitchen (Nashville, TN); Blackbird (Nashville, TN)
- Genre: Country pop
- Length: 54:04
- Labels: Arista Nashville; 19
- Producers: Desmond Child; Dann Huff; Mark Bright

Carrie Underwood chronology
Some Hearts (2005)	Carnival Ride (2007)

Singles from Some Hearts
- 1. "Jesus, Take the Wheel" Released: October 18, 2005; 2. "Some Hearts" Released: November 7, 2005; 3. "Don't Forget to Remember Me" Released: March 13, 2006; 4. "Before He Cheats" Released: August 2006; 5. "Wasted" Released: January 2007

Some Hearts is the debut studio album by American singer and songwriter Carrie Underwood. It was released on November 15, 2005, by Arista Nashville. The album was recorded shortly after Underwood's win on American Idol and marked her transition from television fame to mainstream country music. A country pop album that blends contemporary country and pop influences, Some Hearts features production from Mark Bright and Dann Huff. It includes the singles "Jesus, Take the Wheel", "Don't Forget to Remember Me", "Before He Cheats", "Wasted", and the title track. Songs such as "Jesus, Take the Wheel" and "Before He Cheats" became major crossover hits, with the latter becoming one of the best-selling country singles of all time.

Upon release, Some Hearts received generally positive reviews, with critics praising Underwood's vocal performance while noting its polished production. It was a commercial success, debuting at number two on the Billboard 200 and topping the Top Country Albums chart, where it became the best-selling country album of both 2006 and 2007. Some Hearts earned Underwood multiple awards, including the Grammy Award for Best New Artist and Album of the Year at the Academy of Country Music Awards. Certified nine times Platinum by the Recording Industry Association of America (RIAA), it remains the best-selling debut album by a solo female country artist and one of the most successful country albums of the 2000s.

== Background and development ==
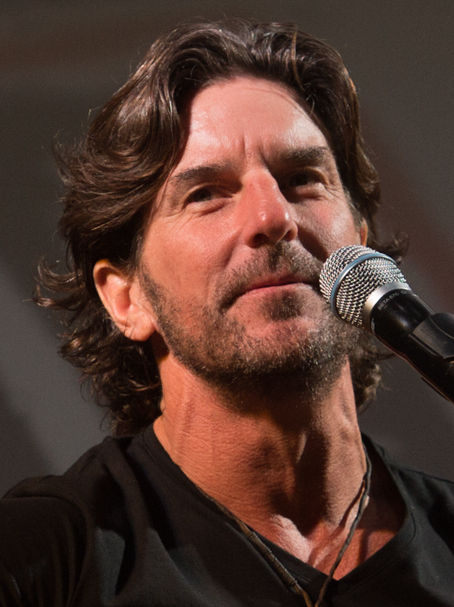
Underwood co-wrote "Jesus, Take the Wheel" with Brett James (pictured).

About the song "Jesus, Take the Wheel", co-writer Brett James said it was written at Hillary Lindsey's house, with the original title being "When Jesus Takes the Wheel", and that there was no specific artist in mind to record the song. In 2016, singer Hillary Scott stated that she was initially offered the song while Underwood was on American Idol. Following her win, Underwood traveled back to her home in Oklahoma before heading again to Los Angeles for the American Idols Live tour rehearsals. At the time, Underwood told People: "This is my time to see the world. Home will be there when I get back." She later bought her first home in the Nashville suburb of Franklin, Tennessee in November 2005 before selling it in 2007. Billboard article, from October 2005, first announced the name of her debut studio album Some Hearts, mentioning "I Ain't in Checotah Anymore" and "What Else You Got" as its tracks, with the latter being cut from the finished record.

According to co-writer Chris Tompkins, the song "Before He Cheats" was written in two hours at his home, and was initially meant for Gretchen Wilson's second studio album with a more humorous delivery, until Underwood recorded it. Recording of Some Hearts took place in three months, while Underwood was touring, and she met with writers such as Hillary Lindsey and Rivers Rutherford at Karian Studios during a writing session.

== Promotion ==
In May 2025, Underwood announced a vinyl special edition of Some Hearts to commemorate twenty years since the album's debut. Available for pre-order on November 14 through Target, ahead of the album's anniversary date, it features an all-new alternate cover, an exclusive photo booklet, and four live tracks from her 2005 session at Nashville's Blackbird Studios.

=== Singles ===
The first single from Some Hearts, "Jesus, Take the Wheel", was released on October 18, 2005, being serviced to US country radio six days later. It peaked at No. 1 on the US Hot Country Songs chart for six consecutive weeks and reached No. 20 on the US Billboard Hot 100. Included in CMT's 40 Greatest Songs of the Decade at number 4, "Jesus, Take the Wheel" was reported to have been sold more than 1 million ringtones and was certified Platinum in August 2008, the first achievement by a country artist for two Platinum Mastertone ranked songs. As of February 2016, it has sold 2,473,000 copies in the United States and has been certified 3× Platinum by the Recording Industry Association of America (RIAA). "Some Hearts", written by Diane Warren and originally recorded by Marshall Crenshaw in 1989, was released to pop and adult contemporary radio only on November 7, eventually reaching number 12 on the US Adult Contemporary chart. As of June 2011, it has sold 207,000 copies.

Underwood debuted "Don't Forget to Remember Me" on March 13, 2006, on The Late Show with David Letterman, and performed it on Live with Regis & Kelly a day later. The song reached number one on the Mediabase Country, two on the Hot Country Songs chart, and 49 on the Hot 100. The song has sold 403,000 copies in the United States and has been certified Gold by the RIAA as of August 12, 2013. "Before He Cheats" was released in August 2006, as the fourth single. (Note: For its August 5, 2006, issue, Billboard reported that Underwood's label Arista Nashville announced "Before He Cheats" as her next single. Billboard called the song the "fourth single from Some Hearts" in its August 19 issue.) It peaked at number one on the Hot Country Songs chart for five consecutive weeks and at number eight on the Hot 100. "Before He Cheats" spent 64 consecutive weeks on the Hot 100, being the sixth longest-charting single in the history of the chart. It also reached number 6 on the 2007 Hot 100 Year-End Chart and was named the 2007 Single of the Year by the Country Music Association. It is Underwood's best selling single and the third best-selling song by an American Idol contestant in the United States, having sold 4,312,000 digital downloads as of August 2016, making it the third best-selling country song of all time. It has been certified 7× Platinum by the RIAA. Released in January 2007, (Note: The Country Universe article published January 4, 2007 described "Waste" as the fourth official country radio single, while Billboard wrote that the song was released in Spring 2007.) "Wasted" peaked at number one for three consecutive weeks on the Hot Country Songs and went to number 37 on the Hot 100. The song has sold 705,000 copies in the United States and has been certified Platinum by RIAA in August 2015.

Carrie Underwood's American Idol winning single "Inside Your Heaven", which debuted at number one on the Billboard Hot 100 five months before the release of Some Hearts, is included on the album as a bonus track.

=== Tour ===
To promote Some Hearts, Underwood embarked on her very first solo tour, which was called Carrie Underwood: Live 2006. The tour started April 4, 2006, and ended November 30 of the same year.

== Critical reception ==
Professional ratings
Review scores
Source	Rating
About.com	4.5/5 stars
AllMusic	4/5 stars
Digital Spy	3/5 stars
Entertainment Weekly	C
Robert Christgau	(choice cut)
Slant Magazine	2.5/5 stars
Stylus Magazine	B
USA Today	3/4 stars

The album received mixed reviews from music critics, with most of them criticizing the slick production and lyrical content.

Penny Rondinella of About.com gave a positive review to the album, awarding it with a four-and-a-half stars out of five and said: "American Idol Season 4 winner Carrie Underwood's debut album is just as expected, a country feel with some pop added to it. Lots of variety in her vocals, which tells me she has true talent." AllMusic gave it 4 out of 5 stars and classified the album as "as anthemic country pop", suited for both country and adult contemporary radio, noting that Underwood's debut effectively captured this balance and showcased her strong vocal performance. It further stated that Underwood delivered a convincing performance across different styles, sounding equally at ease on emotional tracks like "Jesus, Take the Wheel" and the soaring pop-driven "Some Hearts," while bringing a passionate edge to "Before He Cheats." USA Today wrote that Underwood "understands the difference between vocal pyrotechnics and genuine interpretation", noting that while Some Hearts includes a few showy pop moments, it also reveals a "refreshing genuineness" and maturity that highlights her growth and potential as an artist.

However, Slant Magazine criticized Some Hearts for lacking originality, arguing that many songs imitate the styles of other country artists, though it acknowledged the album's strong potential for producing multiple hit singles. Digital Spy described Some Hearts as "equal parts soft rock and country", noting that its mandolin and fiddle sounds are often drowned out by surging guitars and drivetime drums. The review characterized the songs as "anthemic and perfect for long, lonely car journeys, blessed with big choruses and bittersweet lyrics," while also remarking that they felt "a bit old-fashioned." In particular, Chris Willman of Entertainment Weekly said: "Among the Idol classes, Carrie Underwood was refreshing—but now that she's going up against country's big girls with the release of Some Hearts, you mostly notice how even the best songs on this slick debut don't stack up against the worst on Sara's or Lee Ann's latest."

== Awards and nominations ==
Some Hearts awards and nominations
Award	Category	Result	Ref.
41st Academy of Country Music Awards	Album of the Year	Won	
2006 Billboard Music Awards	Album of the Year	Won	
2006 Billboard Music Awards	Country Album of the Year	Won	
2006 Billboard Music Awards	Female Billboard 200 Album Artist of the Year	Won	
2007 American Music Awards	Favorite Country Album	Won	
2009 Billboard Music Awards	Country Album of the Decade	Won	

== Commercial performance ==
Some Hearts debuted at number two on the Billboard 200, behind Madonna's Confessions on a Dance Floor (2005), and one on the US Top Country Albums chart, selling 315,000 copies in its first week. Its large first week sales made it the biggest debut of any country artist since the advent of the SoundScan system in 1991. It was also the fifth best first-week sales for any American Idol contestant. (Note: Behind Ruben Studdard's Soulful (sold over 417,000 copies), Underwood's Play On (318,000) and Carnival Ride (527,000), and Clay Aiken's Measure of a Man (613,000), in their first week.) In the week of December 25, 2006, the album's fifty-eighth week on the chart, the album rose back up to number six on the Billboard 200 chart, after selling close to 300,000 copies.

Some Hearts became the best-selling album of 2006 in all genres in the United States. The album was also the best-selling country album in the United States of both 2006 and 2007, making Underwood the first female artist in Billboard history to earn back-to-back honors for Top Country Album. Additionally, it was the best-selling female country album of 2005, 2006 and 2007. On Billboard 200, the album had a run of 137 consecutive weeks on the chart, the second-longest for any album released in 2005, behind Nickelback's All the Right Reasons, making it the sixth album with the most weeks spent on such a chart since 2000. On the week dated December 12, 2009, under the changes of Billboard's rules, the album re-entered the Billboard 200, at number 132. It also appeared on the Billboard Year-End Chart for 2009, coming in at number 158 for album sales that year. On the week dated for August 14, 2010, the album climbed back onto the Billboard 200, reaching No. 191. On the week dated for December 5, 2010, the album once again appeared, reaching No. 192. On the week dated for December 8, 2012, the album once again landed onto the Billboard 200, reaching No. 69.

Some Hearts has since been certified nine times Platinum by the RIAA, and is the fastest-selling debut country album in the history of the SoundScan era, the best-selling solo female debut album in country music history, the best-selling Country album of the last 10 years, and the best-selling album by an American Idol alumni in the U.S. As of December 2015, it has sold over 7,450,000 copies in the United States. On October 24, 2016, the album was certified 8× Platinum by the RIAA. By December 2007, Some Hearts had sold over 7 million copies worldwide. Worldwide sales stand at 10 million copies. In December 2009, Billboard announced that the album was the biggest-selling country album of the 2000s decade. On August 6, 2016, issue of Billboard, Some Hearts reached No. 7 on the All-time Country Albums chart. In October 2021, the album was certified nine times Platinum, with the single "Before He Cheats" certified seven times Platinum.

Some Hearts won Album of the Year at the 2007 Academy of Country Music Awards, while "Jesus, Take the Wheel" and "Before He Cheats" both won Single of the Year at the 2006 Academy of Country Music Awards and 2007 Country Music Association Awards, respectively. At the 49th Grammy Awards, in 2007, Underwood won the Grammy Award for Best New Artist and the Grammy Award for Best Female Country Vocal Performance for "Jesus, Take the Wheel". The following year, at the 50th Grammy Awards, Underwood won the Grammy for Best Female Country Vocal Performance for "Before He Cheats", also winning Best Country Song for the songwriters as well as being nominated for Song of the Year.

== Track listing ==
Dann Huff produced tracks 3, 6, 8, 9, 11, and 12, while Mark Bright produced the rest, except where noted.

Standard edition
No.	Title	Writer(s)	Producer(s)	Length
1.	"Wasted"	Troy Verges; Marv Green; Hillary Lindsey		4:34
2.	"Don't Forget to Remember Me"	Morgane Hayes; Kelley Lovelace; Ashley Gorley		4:00
3.	"Some Hearts"	Diane Warren		3:48
4.	"Jesus, Take the Wheel"	Brett James; Lindsey; Gordie Sampson		3:46
5.	"The Night Before (Life Goes On)"	Wendell Mobley; Neil Thrasher; Jimmy Olander		3:54
6.	"Lessons Learned"	Warren		4:09
7.	"Before He Cheats"	Chris Tompkins; Josh Kear		3:19
8.	"Starts with Goodbye"	Angelo Petraglia; Lindsey		4:06
9.	"I Just Can't Live a Lie"	Steve Robson; Wayne Hector		3:59
10.	"We're Young and Beautiful"	Rivers Rutherford; Steve McEwan		3:53
11.	"That's Where It Is"	Melissa Peirce; Robson; Greg Becker		3:35
12.	"Whenever You Remember"	Warren		3:47
13.	"I Ain't in Checotah Anymore"	Carrie Underwood; Trey Bruce; Petraglia		3:21
14.	"Inside Your Heaven" (bonus track)	Andreas Carlsson; Pelle Nyhlén; Savan Kotecha	Desmond Child	3:45
Total length:				54:04

20th anniversary edition
No.	Title	Length
15.	"Wasted" (live at Blackbird Studios, Nashville, TN – October 26, 2005)	4:41
16.	"Some Hearts" (live at Blackbird Studios, Nashville, TN – October 26, 2005)	4:04
17.	"Jesus, Take the Wheel" (live at Blackbird Studios, Nashville, TN – October 26, 2005)	3:48
18.	"Inside Your Heaven" (live at Blackbird Studios, Nashville, TN – October 26, 2005)	3:50
Total length:		70:24

== Credits and personnel ==
Credits were adapted from the liner notes.

=== Locations ===
- Recorded at Starstruck Studios (Nashville, TN), The Plant Studios (Sausalito, CA), Electrokitty Recording (Seattle, WA), The Sound Kitchen (Nashville, TN), and Blackbird Studios (Nashville, TN)
- Mixed at Starstruck Studios (Nashville, TN)
- Mastered at MasterMix (Nashville, TN)

=== Personnel ===
- Tom Bukovac – electric guitar
- Jim Van Cleve – fiddle
- Lisa Cochran – background vocals
- Perry Coleman – background vocals
- Randy Cantor – acoustic guitar, electric guitar, bass guitar, lap steel guitar, keyboards, programming, recording
- J. T. Corenflos – electric guitar
- Gretchen Peters – strings, writer
- Jeanette Olsson – background vocals
- Stephen Crook – recording
- Eric Darken – percussion
- Shannon Forrest – drums
- Paul Franklin – steel guitar
- Morgane Hayes – background vocals
- Wes Hightower – background vocals
- Mark Hill – bass guitar
- Dann Huff – electric guitar
- Tim Roberts – drums, assistant mix engineer
- John Hanes – piano, additional Pro Tools engineers
- Mike Johnson – steel guitar
- Charlie Judge – keyboards, programming
- Hillary Lindsey – background vocals
- Chris McHugh – drums
- Gary Morse – steel guitar
- Jacob Miller – additional vocal production
- Carlos Alvarez – mixing
- Bryan Golder – recording
- Mikal Blue – recording
- Stephen Crook – recording
- Clarita Sanchaz – assistant mix engineer
- Serban Ghenea – mixing
- Steve Nathan – keyboards
- Matt Rollings – piano
- Jimmie Lee Sloas – bass guitar
- Adam Steffey – mandolin
- Bryan Sutton – acoustic guitar
- Neil Thrasher – background vocals
- Carrie Underwood – lead vocals, background vocals
- Biff Watson – acoustic guitar
- Lonnie Wilson – drums
- Jonathan Yudkin – fiddle, dobro, mandolin, banjo, violin, viola, cello, arco bass, octofone

=== Notes ===
- All strings on "Jesus, Take the Wheel" performed and arranged by Jonathan Yudkin.
- String section on "Lessons Learned" and "Starts with Goodbye":
  - Arranged and conducted by Paul Buckmaster
  - Violins – Cani, Susan Chatman, Joel Derouin, Endre Granat, Julian Hallmark, Mario de Leon, Michael Markman, Sid Page, Alyssa Park, Michele Richards, Teresa Stanisla, Josefina Vergara
  - Violas – Denyse Buffum, Andrew Duckles, Matt Funes, Shanti Randall
  - Cellos – Larry Corbett, Suzie Katayama, Steve Richards, Daniel Smith

== Charts ==
=== Weekly charts ===
Weekly chart performance
Chart (2005–2007)	Peak position
Australian Albums (ARIA)	130
Canadian Albums (Billboard)	11
Canadian Country Albums (Nielsen SoundScan)	1
UK Country Albums (Official Charts)	1
US Billboard 200	2
US Top Country Albums (Billboard)	1

=== Year-end charts ===
Year-end chart performance (2005)
Chart (2005)	Position
Worldwide Albums (IFPI)	37

Year-end chart performance (2006)
Chart (2006)	Position
US Billboard 200	1
US Billboard Top Country Albums	1

Year-end chart performance (2007)
Chart (2007)	Position
US Billboard 200	5
US Billboard Top Country Albums	1

Year-end chart performance (2008)
Chart (2008)	Position
US Billboard 200	89
US Billboard Top Country Albums	19

== Certifications ==
Certifications and sales
Region	Certification	Certified units/sales
Australia (ARIA)	Gold	35,000^{^}
Canada (Music Canada)	3× Platinum	300,000^{^}
New Zealand (RMNZ)	Platinum	15,000^{‡}
United States (RIAA)	9× Platinum	9,000,000^{‡} / 7,450,000
^{^} Shipments figures based on certification alone.^{‡} Sales+streaming figures based on certification alone.

== Release history ==
Release dates and formats
Region	Date	Format	Edition	Label	Ref.
Various	November 15, 2005	CD; digital download; streaming; vinyl	Standard	Arista Nashville; 19	
Various	November 14, 2025	Digital download; streaming	20th anniversary	Sony	
