= Brief and Beautiful =

Single by Maria Arredondo

from the album For a Moment
- Released: 2007
- Recorded: 2007
- Genre: Pop
- Length: 3:51
- Label: Mountain Music
- Producer: Bjørn Erik Pedersen

Maria Arredondo singles chronology
"On Christmas Day" (2006)	"Brief and Beautiful" (2007)	"Kyrie Eleison" (2007)

"Brief and Beautiful" is the third single by Norwegian pop singer Maria Arredondo, released from her fourth album, For a Moment. The single spent six weeks on the charts, peak at No.4.

== Charts ==
Chart (2007)	Peak position
Norwegian Top 20	#4
