= In Love with an Angel =

Single by Maria Arredondo featuring Christian Ingebrigtsen

from the album Maria Arredondo
- Released: 2003
- Recorded: 2003
- Genre: Pop
- Length: 4:31
- Label: Universal
- Songwriter: Christian Ingebrigtsen

Maria Arredondo singles chronology
"Just a Little Heartache" (2002)	"In Love with an Angel" (2003)	"Hardly Hurts At All" (2003)

"In Love with an Angel" was the third and most famous single released by Maria Arredondo. It was released on February 24, 2003, and came in at number one on the Norwegian Top 20 Singles in its second week.

== Track listing ==
Norwegian CD Single

1. "In Love with an Angel" feat. Christian Ingebrigtsen - 04:31
2. "For a Friend" - 04:05

== Charts ==
Chart (2003)	Peak position
Norwegian Top 20	1
