= Maria Arredondo (album) =

Studio album by Maria Arredondo
- Released: March 17, 2003 First Version June 30, 2003 Second Version
- Recorded: 2000–2002
- Genre: Norwegian pop
- Length: 41:47 First version 45:17 Second version
- Label: Universal Music

Maria Arredondo chronology
| Maria Arredondo (2003) | Not Going Under (2004) |

Singles from Maria Arredondo
- 1. "Can Let Go" Released: May 2002; 2. "Just A Little Heartache" Released: December 2002; 3. "In Love with an Angel" Released: February 2003; 4. "Hardly Hurts At All" Released: July 2003; 5. "A Thousand Nights" Released: November 2003

Professional ratings
Review scores
| Source | Rating |
|---|---|
| VG.no | 6/6 stars |

Maria Arredondo is the first album by Norwegian singer Maria Arredondo, released in Norway on March 17, 2003, with a second edition released on June 30, 2003. The album was the most successful album by Arredondo either in critics or sales. It has 12 songs with the second edition and 5 singles were released. One of the singles, "In Love With An Angel", a duet with Christian Ingebrigtsen, was nominated for the 2003 Norwegian Grammy Awards as 'Song Of The Year'.

== History ==
After two years recording the songs, Arredondo signed with Universal Music Norway. The album entered the Norwegian Top 40 and Norwegian Topp 30 Norsk at #2 and spent 23 weeks on the charts. It was recorded in Sweden and Norway, and was produced by several well-known Scandinavian producers such as Jonas von Der Burg, Espen Lind, Bluefish, Jonny Sjo, Harry Sommerdahl and Bjørn Erik Pedersen. Several successful songwriters also contributed, including Christian Ingebrigtsen, Jonas von Der Burg, Silje Nergaard, Espen Lind and Harry Sommerdahl. The first single released was "Can Let Go". The second single, "Just A Little Heartache" was very successful in the radio charts. "In Love With An Angel" was the third single and became the first and only #1 single for Arredondo.

The album was re-released with a new song, "Hardly Hurts At All", which was released as a single. The last single from the album was "A Thousand Nights". The album went platinum and sold more than 70,000 copies.

== Track listing ==
| # | Title | Writer(s) | Duration |
|---|---|---|---|
| 1. | "Can Let Go" | Sommerdahl / Von der Burg / Bhagavan | 04:02 |
| 2. | "Just A Little Heartache" | Espen Lind / Amund Bjørklund | 03:18 |
| 3. | "In Love With An Angel feat. Christian Ingebrigtsen" | Christian Ingebrigtsen | 04:31 |
| 4. | "True Friendship" | Christian Ingebrigtsen | 03:34 |
| 5. | "Make Me Feel" | Sommerdahl / Von der Burg / Bhagavan | 03:25 |
| 6. | "A Thousand Nights" | Bernt Rune Stray / Percy Duke / Lucie Silvas | 04:07 |
| 7. | "For A Friend" | Bernt Rune Stray / Espen Grjotheim / Odd Inge Bondevik | 04:05 |
| 8. | "Try Again" | Thomas Who | 03:31 |
| 9. | "I Need You" | Merethe La Verdi / Anne Brændeland / Bjørn Erik Pedersen | 03:25 |
| 10. | "Better Than That" | Bottolf Lødemel / Lars Aass | 03:10 |
| 11. | "On and On" | Silje Nergaard | 04:33 |
Second Edition
| 1. | "Hardly Hurts At All | Espen Lind / Amund Bjørklund | 03:30 |
| 2. | "Can Let Go" | Sommerdahl / Von der Burg / Bhagavan | 04:02 |
| 3. | "Just A Little Heartache" | Espen Lind / Amund Bjørklund | 03:18 |
| 4. | "In Love With An Angel feat. Christian Ingebrigtsen" | Christian Ingebrigtsen | 04:31 |
| 5. | "True Friendship" | Christian Ingebrigtsen | 03:34 |
| 6. | "Make Me Feel" | Sommerdahl / Von der Burg / Bhagavan | 03:25 |
| 7. | "A Thousand Nights" | Bernt Rune Stray / Percy Duke / Lucie Silvas | 04:07 |
| 8. | "For A Friend" | Bernt Rune Stray / Espen Grjotheim / Odd Inge Bondevik | 04:05 |
| 9. | "Try Again" | Thomas Who | 03:31 |
| 10. | "I Need You" | Merethe La Verdi / Anne Brændeland / Bjørn Erik Pedersen | 03:25 |
| 11. | "Better Than That" | Bottolf Lødemel / Lars Aass | 03:10 |
| 12. | "On and On" | Silje Nergaard | 04:33 |

== Charts ==
=== Album ===
| Chart (2003) | Peak Position | Sales/Certification |
|---|---|---|
| Norwegian Topp 40 | 2 | 70.000 / Platinum |

=== Singles ===
| Year | Single | Chart | Peak Position |
|---|---|---|---|
| 2002 | "Can Let Go" | VG Topp20 | - |
| 2002 | "Can Let Go" | Hit40 | #6 |
| 2002 | "Just A Little Heartache" | VG Topp20 | #10 (Gold) |
| 2002 | "Just A Little Heartache" | Hit40 | #2 |
| 2003 | "In Love With An Angel" | VG Topp20 | #1 (2 weeks/Platinum) |
| 2003 | "In Love With An Angel" | Hit40 | #1 |
| 2003 | "Hardly Hurts At All" | VG Topp20 | #5 (Gold) |
| 2003 | "Hardly Hurts At All" | Hit40 | - |
| 2003 | "A Thousand Nights" | VG Topp20 | - |
| 2003 | "A Thousand Nights" | Hit40 | - |
