= Hardly Hurts at All =

Single by Maria Arredondo

from the album Maria Arredondo
- Released: 21 July 2003
- Recorded: 2003
- Genre: Pop
- Length: 3:30
- Label: Universal
- Songwriter(s): Espen Lind / Amund Bjørklund

Maria Arredondo singles chronology
"In Love with an Angel" (2002)	"Hardly Hurts at All" (2003)	"A Thousand Nights" (2003)

"Hardly Hurts at All" is a 2003 single by Maria Arredondo from Maria Arredondo. This single is part from the second CD's version. Hardly Hurts at All peaked at number 5 in Norway.

== Track listing ==
Norwegian CD Single

1. "Hardly Hurts At All" - 03:30
2. "On and On" - 04:33

== Charts ==
Chart (2003)	Peak position
Norway (VG-lista)	5
