= Just a Little Heartache =

Single by Maria Arredondo

from the album Maria Arredondo
- Released: 2002/2003
- Recorded: 2002
- Genre: Pop
- Length: 3:18
- Label: Universal
- Songwriter: Espen Lind / Amund Bjørklund

Maria Arredondo singles chronology
"Can Let Go" (2002)	"Just a Little Heartache" (2002)	"In Love with an Angel" (2003)

"Just a Little Heartache" was the second single released by Maria Arredondo on December 9, 2002. There's no video for this single.

== Track listing ==
Norwegian CD Single

1. "Just a Little Heartache" - 03:18
2. "Can Let Go" (Mpetre Remix) - 03:23

== Charts ==
Chart (2002)	Peak position
Norwegian Top 20	10
