= Don't Forget to Remember Me =

Single by Carrie Underwood

from the album Some Hearts
- Released: March 13, 2006
- Studio: Electrokitty Recording (Seattle, WA); Starstruck Studios (Nashville, TN); The Plant Recording Studios (Sausalito, CA)
- Length: 4:00 (album version); 3:14 (radio edit)
- Label: Arista Nashville
- Songwriters: Morgane Hayes; Kelley Lovelace; Ashley Gorley
- Producer: Mark Bright

Carrie Underwood singles chronology
"Some Hearts" (2005)	"Don't Forget to Remember Me" (2006)	"Before He Cheats" (2006)

Music video
- "Don't Forget to Remember Me" on YouTube

"Don't Forget to Remember Me" is a song by American singer and songwriter Carrie Underwood, the third single from her debut studio album, Some Hearts. Morgane Hayes, Kelley Lovelace and Ashley Gorley wrote the song, while Mark Bright produced it. Underwood debuted "Don't Forget to Remember Me" on March 13, 2006, on The Late Show with David Letterman. It peaked at number two on the US Billboard country charts in early 2006, and number 49 on the Billboard Hot 100. It has sold 403,000 copies.

== Release ==
Underwood debuted "Don't Forget to Remember Me" on March 13, 2006, on The Late Show with David Letterman. She later performed the song on Live with Regis & Kelly a day later.

== Music video ==
In the music video, which was premiered on CMT on March 16, 2006. Underwood is shown walking off a bus and immediately signing autographs, as the song moves on Underwood, in her new house, has flashbacks of when she is loading up her Chevy with equipment and hugging her mother as she sings in the song "We were loading up that Chevy both tryin' not to cry." Underwood also sings while approaching a public telephone to call her mother and at the end of the music video she takes the stage and sings to an empty large auditorium. Underwood's mother appears in the video as herself.

== Commercial performance ==
The song debuted at number 54 on the Billboard Hot Country Songs chart. It entered the U.S. Billboard Hot 100 at number 98 after two weeks of being in the Top 30 on the country charts. It reached number two on Hot Country Songs and spent one week at that position. As of August 13, 2013, the single has sold 403,000 copies and was certified gold by the RIAA.

== Personnel ==
Credits are adapted from the liner notes of Some Hearts.

- Jim Van Cleve – fiddle
- J. T. Corenflos – electric guitar
- Eric Darken – percussion
- Morgane Hayes – background vocals
- Mike Johnson – steel guitar
- Steve Nathan – keyboards
- Jimmie Lee Sloas – bass guitar
- Adam Steffey – mandolin
- Biff Watson – acoustic guitar
- Lonnie Wilson – drums

== Chart performance ==
=== Weekly charts ===
"Don't Forget to Rember Me" weekly chart performance
Chart (2006)	Peak position
Canada Country (Billboard)	4
US Billboard Hot 100	49
US Hot Country Songs (Billboard)	2

=== Year-end charts ===
"Don't Forget to Rember Me" year-end chart performance
Chart (2006)	Position
US Country Songs (Billboard)	13

== Awards ==
=== 2007 ASCAP Country Music Awards ===
"Don't Forget to Rember Me" awards
Year	Nominee / work	Award	Result
2007	"Don't Forget to Remember Me"	Most Performed Song of the Year	Won

== Certifications ==
"Don't Forget to Rember Me" certifications
Region	Certification	Certified units/sales
United States (RIAA)	Gold	500,000^{‡}
^{‡} Sales+streaming figures based on certification alone.
