= Jesus, Take the Wheel =

Single by Carrie Underwood

from the album Some Hearts
- Released: October 18, 2005
- Recorded: 2005
- Studio: Electrokitty Recording (Seattle, WA); Starstruck Studios (Nashville, TN); The Plant Recording Studios (Sausalito, CA)
- Genre: Christian country
- Length: 3:46
- Label: Arista Nashville
- Songwriters: Hillary Lindsey; Gordie Sampson; Brett James
- Producer: Mark Bright

Carrie Underwood singles chronology
"Inside Your Heaven" (2005)	"Jesus, Take the Wheel" (2005)	"Some Hearts" (2005)

Music video
- "Jesus, Take the Wheel" on YouTube

"Jesus, Take the Wheel" is a song recorded by American country music artist Carrie Underwood. It was released on October 18, 2005, as the first single from Underwood's debut album Some Hearts (2005). The ballad tells of a woman seeking help from Jesus in an emergency and surrendering her control to a higher power. The song was written by Brett James, Hillary Lindsey and Gordie Sampson.

"Jesus, Take the Wheel" became the first of Underwood's record-setting 15 number-one singles on the Billboard Hot Country Songs (Note: At the time of the song's release, the airplay chart on which this record is held was known as Hot Country Songs; the current chart with that name is now a multi-metric ranking.) chart, spending six weeks at the number one position. The song enjoyed crossover success, peaking at number four on the Billboard Hot Christian Songs chart and charting on the Billboard Adult Contemporary chart. It also became a top 20 hit on the Billboard Hot 100 chart. "Jesus, Take the Wheel" has sold over 2.743 million copies in the United States as of February 2016 and has been certified three-times Platinum by the RIAA.

Underwood has performed "Jesus, Take the Wheel" during multiple awards show appearances and has included the song on the set list for all of her headlining concert tours. "Jesus, Take the Wheel" won the Grammy Awards for Best Female Country Vocal Performance and Best Country Song and it won Single of the Year at the 2005 Academy of Country Music Awards, amongst other nominations at these and other award ceremonies. The song ranked number four on CMT's "40 Greatest Songs of the Decade".

== Composition ==
"Jesus, Take the Wheel" is a Christian country song that lasts for three minutes and forty-six seconds. The song is composed in the key of A major and is set in the time signature of 4/4 common time with a moderately slow tempo of 76 beats per minute. Underwood's vocal range spans over two octaves from F♯_{3} to E_{5}.

The song was written at co-writer Hillary Lindsey's house and is centered around the premise of what happens "when Jesus takes the wheel," a phrase Gordie Sampson brought to the writing session as a possible title. Lyrically, the song tells the story of a woman who survives a car crash, seemingly as part of a miracle of divine intervention. Personal stories from the writers' pasts influenced details of the song's lyrics. Upon the song's release, some critics questioned the marketability of launching Underwood's career with an overtly faith-based song.

== Critical reception ==
In a review of Some Hearts, Stephen Thomas Erlewine of AllMusic praised Underwood's delivery of the song, writing that she "sounds equally convincing on such sentimental fare as 'Jesus, Take the Wheel' as on the soaring pop 'Some Hearts'". In 2013, Matt Bjorke of RoughStock ranked "Jesus, Take the Wheel" as the tenth-best song of Underwood's career at that point, writing that that song "show[ed] the strength of her voice through complex vocal runs and tender verse readings." On a similar ranking in 2017, Chuck Dauphin of Billboard placed the song as Underwood's fourth-best song to date. Rolling Stone ranked the song as Underwood's eighth-best, based on a reader-voted poll, in 2015 and wrote that "as Underwood's vocals soared into the stratosphere during the track's final chorus, so did her career."

== Charts performance ==
"Jesus, Take the Wheel" debuted at number 39 on the Billboard Hot Country Songs chart and eventually hit number one in January 2006, becoming the first of Underwood's record-setting 15 number-ones. The song spent six weeks atop the chart, the longest-running number one debut single since Nielsen Broadcast Data Systems was initiated in 1990 (this record would later be broken in 2024 when Shaboozey's A Bar Song (Tipsy) reached seven weeks at number one on Country Airplay). Jesus, Take the Wheel additionally peaked at number four on the Hot Christian Songs chart and at number 23 on the Adult Contemporary chart. This crossover airplay helped the song reach the upper tier of the all-genre Billboard Hot 100 chart, where it reached a peak position of 20. "Jesus, Take the Wheel" also hit number one of the Canadian country airplay chart compiled by Radio & Records.

"Jesus, Take the Wheel" has been certified two-times Platinum in the United States as of August 2015. The Mastertone of the song was also certified Platinum in July 2008, making Underwood the first country artist to have two songs reach this milestone (after "Before He Cheats"). As of February 2016, "Jesus, Take the Wheel" has sold 2,473,000 copies in the United States. In 2007, "Jesus, Take the Wheel" was certified Gold by Music Canada.

== Live performances ==
Underwood gave her debut performance of the song at the 2005 Country Music Association Awards. On May 23, 2006, she again sang it at the 41st annual Academy of Country Music Awards, where she won the Single of the Year Award for the song. Billboard described the latter performance as "captivating".

In April 2006, she sang "Jesus, Take the Wheel" on the CMT Awards, where the song won two major awards: Breakthrough Video of the Year and Female Video of the Year.

Underwood performed the song during her debut tour: Carrie Underwood: Live in Concert, and has subsequently performed the track in all of her tours as well as during her sets at the CMA Music Festival, Stagecoach, C2C: Country to Country and Glastonbury festivals.

== Music video ==
The music video was Underwood's first and was directed by Roman White. It features her singing in various backgrounds such as a living room, through shelves, standing by a wall, and sitting in a chair. A woman, a young couple, and an older couple are all shown through the video trying to ease a baby, fighting over bills and making up, and trying to feed his wife respectively. It premiered on CMT on November 24, 2005.

"Jesus, Take the Wheel" was nominated for Music Video of the Year at the 2006 Country Music Association Awards and was ranked No. 64 on CMT's 100 Greatest Videos.

== Charts ==
=== Weekly charts ===
Chart (2005–2006)	Peak position
Canada Country Top 30 (Radio & Records)	1
US Billboard Hot 100	20
US Adult Contemporary (Billboard)	23
US Hot Christian Songs (Billboard)	4
US Hot Country Songs (Billboard)	1

=== Year-end charts ===
Chart (2006)	Position
US Billboard Hot 100	78
US Christian Songs (Billboard)	11
US Country Songs (Billboard)	5

== Certifications and sales ==
Region	Certification	Certified units/sales
Canada (Music Canada)	Gold	20,000^{*}
New Zealand (RMNZ)	Gold	15,000^{‡}
United States (RIAA)	3× Platinum	2,473,000
United States (RIAA) Mastertone	Platinum	1,000,000^{*}
^{*} Sales figures based on certification alone.^{‡} Sales+streaming figures based on certification alone.

== Awards and nominations ==
Year	Association	Category	Result
2006	Academy of Country Music	Single of the Year	Won
2006	Academy of Country Music	Song of the Year	Nominated
2006	Country Music Association	Music Video of the Year	Nominated
2006	Country Music Association	Single of the Year	Nominated
2006	Country Music Association	Song of the Year	Nominated
2006	Canadian Country Music Awards	SOCAN Song of the Year	Won
2006	CMT Music Awards	Female Video of the Year	Won
2006	CMT Music Awards	Breakthrough Video of the Year	Won
2006	Gospel Music Association	Country Song of the Year	Won
2007	Grammy Awards	Best Female Country Vocal Performance	Won
2007	Grammy Awards	Song of the Year	Nominated
2007	Grammy Awards	Best Country Song	Won

== Notable covers ==
- 2007: American Idol sixth season contestant LaKisha Jones
- 2009: American Idol eighth season contestant Danny Gokey
- 2011: Vince Gill, during Academy of Country Music Girls Night Out
- 2012: American Idol eleventh season contestant Hollie Cavanagh
- 2012: Kristin Chenoweth, featured in the GCB episode "Hell Hath No Fury" and released on its official soundtrack
- 2013: The Voice fourth season contestant Danielle Bradbery
- 2013: VeggieTales, featured on the album Bob & Larry Go Country

== Release history ==
Release dates and formats
Region	Date	Format	Label	Ref.
United States	October 18, 2005	Digital download	Arista Nashville	
United States	October 24, 2005	Country radio	Arista Nashville	
