= Mad Summer =

Single by Maria Arredondo

from the album Not Going Under
- Released: 2004
- Recorded: 2004
- Genre: Pop
- Length: 3:07
- Label: Universal
- Songwriter(s): Espen Lind / Amund Bjørklund
- Producer(s): Espionage

Maria Arredondo singles chronology
"A Thousand Nights" (2003)	"Mad Summer" (2004)	"Burning" (2004)

"Mad Summer" is the first single released from Maria Arredondo's album, Not Going Under. It was released on 14 June 2004 and was the first Arredondo single to become a video.

== Track listing ==
Norwegian CD Single

1. "Mad Summer" - 03:07
2. "Mad Summer" (Jr. Grandoza Remix) - 04:36

== Charts ==
Chart (2004)	Peak position
Norwegian Top 20	3
