= Josh Shilling =

American musician

- Born: Martinsville, Virginia, United States
- Genres: Americana, Bluegrass, Country, Rock
- Occupations: Singer/Songwriter, Instrumentalist
- Instruments: Vocals, Keyboard, Organ, Guitar
- Label: unsigned
- Member of: Mountain Heart
- Website: www.joshshilling.com

Josh Shilling (born in Martinsville, Virginia) is an American musician. He joined the bluegrass band Mountain Heart in 2007. Shilling's debut with Mountain Heart was at The Grand Ole Opry in January 2007. He has been noted in "American Noise".

In 2012, Shilling released his first solo album, "Letting Go", and his first Christmas solo, "The Christmas Song".

Shilling co-hosted a show, "That Just Happened", on historical WSM Radio along with bandmates Jim VanCleve and Seth Taylor. The show was cancelled in 2013.
