= Burning (Maria Arredondo song) =

Single by Maria Arredondo

from the album Not Going Under
- Released: 2004
- Recorded: 2004
- Genre: Pop
- Length: 3:59
- Label: Universal
- Songwriter(s): Jørn Dahl and Laila Samuelsen
- Producer(s): Jørn Dahl

Maria Arredondo singles chronology
"Mad Summers" (2003)	"Burning" (2004)	"Cross Every River" (2004)

"Burning" is the second single released from Maria Arredondo's album Not Going Under. It was released in September 2004 and was the second Arredondo single to become a video.

== Track listing ==
Norwegian radio single

1. "Burning" – 03:59

== Charts ==
Chart (2004)	Peak position
Norwegian Airplay	1

== Trivia ==
Professional DOTA player Zhi Lei "BurNIng" Xu chose his ID from this song after being introduced to it by his first girlfriend.
