= Barry Scott & Second Wind =

American bluegrass/bluegrass gospel band

Barry Scott and Second Wind was a bluegrass/bluegrass gospel band based out of the East Tennessee area. They are best known for their debut album In God's Time, which received a 2010 Grammy nomination for Best Southern, Country or Bluegrass Gospel Album.

The band is also known for its a capella songs. The second album, Sunday Mornin' Meetin' Time, consists of a combination of a capella and instrumental tracks.

Scott formed the band after performing for ten years as lead singer for the band Quicksilver.

The band has performed at the Lewis Family Homecoming & Bluegrass Festival and the Lincoln County Bluegrass and Gospel Sing.

Barry Scott & Second Wind disbanded in December, 2010.

== Band members ==
Barry Scott & Second Wind members were Barry Scott (guitar and lead vocals), Jason Leek (bass and vocals), Matthew Munsey (mandolin and vocals), Travis Houck (dobro and vocals), and Zane Petty (banjo).

== Discography ==
=== Studio albums ===
Year	Album	Label
2009	In God's Time	Rebel Records
2010	Sunday Mornin' Meetin' Time	Self released
