= Mountain Heart =

American band

- Genres: bluegrass, acoustic, country, southern rock
- Years active: 1998-present
- Label: Compass Records
- Members: Travis Anderson; Ashby Frank; Josh Shilling; Seth Taylor; Matt Menefee
- Past members: Barry Abernathy; Steve Gulley; Adam Steffey; Jim Van Cleve; Johnny Dowdle; Jason Moore; Clay Jones; Jake Stargel; Jeff Partin; Aaron Ramsey
- Website: mountainheart.com

Mountain Heart is an American band, which combines elements of rock, jam band, country, blues, jazz, folk and bluegrass music. Mountain Heart or its members have won or been nominated for multiple Grammys, ACM, CMA, and IBMA Awards. They have appeared on the stage of the Grand Ole Opry

The group is signed to Compass Records.

== History ==
The band was formed in 1998 by Barry Abernathy, Steve Gulley (vocals, guitar), Adam Steffey (mandolin), and Jim VanCleve. Johnny Dowdle was introduced early as the band's original bassist. For a short period, Adam Steffey left the band to play with bluegrass/gospel group The Isaacs, during which Steffey was replaced by Alan Perdue. Early in 2000, Dowdle left the group and was replaced by Jason Moore, the former bassist for the James King Band. In 2001, Steffey returned to the group, and Mountain Heart added virtuoso guitarist, Clay Jones, in 2003.

Mountain Heart performed in Scarborough, Ontario as part of the Bluegrass Sundays Winter Concert Series in 2000 and 2001. In 2005, they took part in the Gettysburg Bluegrass Festival. Later, in 2007, the band revisited Canada when they played the Tottenham Bluegrass Festival in Ontario.

The band released their first, eponymous project in 1999, on Doobie Shea Records, following it quickly with an all-gospel release, The Journey. In 2001, the band signed with Skaggs Family Records and soon released No Other Way, their first for the label. The project was nominated for Album of the Year by the IBMA, with Mountain Heart being nominated for Entertainer of the Year. In 2004, they released Force Of Nature, which again earned the band nominations for Album of the Year and Entertainer of the Year. The group released their final Skaggs Family Records recording in 2005, entitled Wide Open. The album, produced by Mark Bright, was notable for a stylistic departure for the band into the americana/folk/country sound.

In December 2006, the band announced that lead singer, Steve Gulley, would be leaving the group. In January 2007, Josh Shilling debuted as the band's new lead singer at the Grand Ole Opry in Nashville, TN. In September of that year, Jones was replaced by Grammy Award winning guitarist, Clay Hess. In December 2007, mandolinist Aaron Ramsey replaced Steffey, making his debut also on the stage of The Grand Ole Opry. Clay Jones returned replacing Hess in January 2009, joining the band again at The Ark, in Ann Arbor, Michigan. The Ark would later become the site of their 2007 recording, The Road That Never Ends - The Live Album, their first project with Rural Rhythm Records out of Los Angeles, CA, a single record deal. The album was produced by Jim VanCleve and promoted with a music video produced by Josh Shilling, which brought the band critical acclaim and greater radio rotation.

In 2010, Mountain Heart opened a record label. Under MH Music Group, the band recorded their first ever self-released project, That Just Happened, in January 2011. Among the album's featured guests are New Grass Revival front man & Doobie Brothers bassist, John Cowan, legendary session drummer, Eddie Bayers, and noted acoustic guitarist, Bryan Sutton. Produced by VanCleve and Mountain Heart, That Just Happened received high praise from critics, scoring a Four Star rating from Country Weekly.

In January 2012, Mountain Heart added guitarist Seth Taylor.

In November 2014, Barry Abernathy left the band to focus on family. Jeff Partin, of Volume 5, joined on guitar, dobro, bass, vocals, and virtually every other instrument.

On May 6, 2016, Mountain Heart released Blue Skies, which saw another revamped line-up, including members of the Cherryholmes.

== Band members ==
- Travis Anderson – bass, vocals
- Ashby Frank - mandolin, lead and harmony vocals
- Josh Shilling – lead and harmony vocals, piano, Hammond B3 organ, acoustic guitar
- Seth Taylor – guitars, vocals
- Matt Menefee - banjo

== Awards and recognition ==
Mountain Heart was awarded the IBMA Emerging Artist of the Year award in 1999, before the release of their first recording.

The group was awarded Gospel Recorded Performance of the Year by the IBMA in 2002.

They have since been nominated for many other IBMA awards, including, "Entertainer of the Year" (2003, 2004, 2005), "Vocal Group of the Year" (2003, 2004, 2005, 2006), and "Instrumental Group of the Year" (2002, 2003, 2004, 2005, 2006, 2007).

As a member of Mountain Heart, Adam Steffey won the Mandolin Player of the Year Award several times (2002, 2003, 2004, 2005, 2006).

Jim VanCleve's solo album No Apologies, which featured all the members of Mountain Heart, was nominated for "Instrumental Recorded Performance of the Year in 2007". The project also won Album of the Year Honors from the Indie Acoustic Awards.

== Discography ==
Title	Album details	Peak positions
Title	Album details	US Bluegrass
Mountain Heart	Release date: September 8, 1999; Label: Doobie Shea Records	—
The Journey	Release date: September 11, 2001; Label: Doobie Shea Records	—
No Other Way	Release date: September 17, 2002; Label: Skaggs Family Records	11
Force of Nature	Release date: May 11, 2004; Label: Skaggs Family Records	5
Wide Open	Release date: February 14, 2006; Label: Skaggs Family Records	4
The Road That Never Ends (The Live Album)	Release date: December 3, 2007; Label: Rural Rhythm Records	4
That Just Happened	Release date: October 12, 2010; Label: MH Music Group	10
Blue Skies	Release date: May 6, 2016; Label: Compass Records	2
Soul Searching	Release date: August 10, 2018; Label: Compass Records	
"—" denotes releases that did not chart

=== Music videos ===
Year	Video
2008	"Road That Never Ends"
