= Min Jul (Maria Arredondo album) =

Min Jul is the third album of Norwegian Singer Maria Arredondo and also her first Norwegian-language album, released by Universal Music Norway in 2005. No music videos were included in this album. The album went platinum.

== Track listing ==
1. Himmel På Jord
2. Glade Jul
3. Sonjas Sang Til Julestjernen
4. Jeg Er Så Glad Hver Julekveld
5. Klagesang
6. Deilig Er Jorden
7. Det Lyser I Stille Grender
8. Ledet Av En Stjerne
9. Det Kimer Nå Til Julefest
10. En Stjerne Skinner I Natt
11. Det Hev Ei Rose Sprunge
12. When You Wish Upon A Star
13. Nå Tennes Tusen Julelys

Written-By – Enger* (tracks: I), Hegeland* (tracks: 3), Balle* (tracks: 9), Monn-Iversen* (tracks: 3), Køhler* (tracks: 13), Skeie* (tracks: 10), Grüber* (tracks: 2), Layritz* (tracks: 11), Mørk* (tracks: 8), Sande* (tracks: 7), Johannesen* (tracks: 1), Mohr* (tracks: 2), Harline* (tracks: 12), Landstad* (tracks: 4), Wexelsen* (tracks: 4), McGurk* (tracks: 5), Washington* (tracks: 12), Grundtvig* (tracks: 9), Knudsen* (tracks: 4), Hognestad* (tracks: 11), Løvland* (tracks: 8), Dagsland* (tracks: V), Beck* (tracks: 7), Aas* (tracks: 10), Trad.* (tracks: 6, 13)

== Credits ==
Arranged By – Eirik Berge (tracks: 1 to 5, 8, 10), Jon Lord (tracks: 6, 9, 11), Kjetil Bjerkestrand (tracks: 13), Ronny Wikmark (tracks: 1, 4), Tormod Tvete Vik (tracks: 7, 12).

Bass – Gjermund Silseth*
Fiddle – Gjermund Larsen (tracks: 8)
Guitar [Lap Steel] – Skjalg Raaen (tracks: 4)
Hardingfele – Gjermund Larsen (tracks: 9)
Harp – Johanna Nousiainen (tracks: 6, 9, 11)
Keyboards – Kjetil Bjerkestrand (tracks: 13), Ronny Wikmark (tracks: 1 to 6, 8 to 11)
Mixed By, Producer – Bjørn Nessjø
Oboe – Steffen Blindheim (tracks: 2, 3, 5, 8, 11)
Orchestra – Trondheimsolistene (tracks: 1 to 7)
Organ – Jon Lord (tracks: 6, 9)
Percussion – Ronny Wikmark (tracks: 1, 2, 4, 5, 10), Rune Arnesen (tracks: 13)

Piano – Eirik Berge (tracks: 1 to 5, 8, 10), Jon Lord (tracks: 6, 9, 11), Kjetil Bjerkestrand (tracks: 13)

Technician – Kjartan Meinseth, Peer Espen Ursfjord*, Rune Nordal
Technician, Producer [Assisitant] – Bjørn Pedersen, Ronny Wikmark

Artwork By – Claudia C. Sandor, Halvor Bodin Photography – Espen, Lasse Berre, Rune
