= Wasted (Carrie Underwood song) =

Single by Carrie Underwood

from the album Some Hearts
- Released: January 2007
- Studio: Electrokitty (Seattle, WA); Starstruck (Nashville, TN); The Plant (Sausalito, CA)
- Length: 4:33 (album version); 3:44 (video version)
- Label: Arista Nashville
- Songwriters: Hillary Lindsey; Marv Green; Troy Verges
- Producer: Mark Bright

Carrie Underwood singles chronology
"Before He Cheats" (2006)	"Wasted" (2007)	"I'll Stand by You" (2007)

Music video
- "Wasted" on YouTube

"Wasted" is a song written by Marv Green, Troy Verges and Hillary Lindsey, and recorded by American singer and songwriter Carrie Underwood. It was released in January 2007, as the fifth and final single from her debut studio album, Some Hearts. It began receiving country radio airplay as an album track, causing it to place on the US Hot Country Songs chart weeks before its official release as a single.

== Background and writing ==
Songwriter Marv Green conceived the title "Wasted" and sought to explore different meanings of the word, particularly the idea of not wasting time. Green, Troy Verges, and Hillary Lindsey subsequently developed the song around a series of vignettes depicting individuals seeking to change the course of their lives. According to Verges, the writers intentionally avoided the more conventional association of "wasted" with partying and left aspects of the narrative open to interpretation.

Green told The Boot that the song originated from the title "Wasted", which he found appealing because of its multiple meanings, including alcohol consumption and the idea of wasting one's life. During a writing session at Verges's house, Verges began playing the song's chord progression while Lindsey improvised the opening lyric, "Standing at the back door". Green recalled that the line helped establish the song's direction, with the writers subsequently developing the narrative from its opening verse.

== Composition ==
"Wasted" explores themes of addiction, temptation, and their consequences, while it depicts two individuals facing different forms of addiction, while leaving much of its narrative open to interpretation. The verses focus on a man overcoming alcohol dependency and a woman leaving a destructive relationship, whose experiences are united by the song's chorus.

== Recording and release ==
"Wasted" was recorded at Electrokitty (Seattle, WA), Starstruck (Nashville, TN), and the Plant Recording Studios (Sausalito, CA). Lindsey, Green, and Verges wrote the song, while Mark Bright produced it. "Wasted" was released in January 2007, via Arista Nashville as the fourth country radio and fifth overall single from Underwood's debut studio album, Some Hearts (2005). On March 8, Underwood performed "Wasted" on American Idol, after they paid her a tribute for her achievements since winning Idol in May 2005.

The music video for "Wasted" was filmed in Pinellas County, Florida. Locations included a residence in Tierra Verde and Fort De Soto Park, whose beaches and campgrounds were featured throughout the video. Presented in black and white, the video depicts Underwood and her love interest moving through the house before travelling to the beach. Randy Brewer of Revolution Pictures, the video's production company, said that the area was selected in part because of its scenery and favorable filming conditions.

== Critical reception ==
Chuck Dauphin of Billboard described "Wasted" as "ear candy", praising Bright's production and the song's combination of vocal and instrumental elements. A press release from the same publication praised the song's "well-crafted lyrics" and highlighed its portrayal of two individuals seeking a better future. They also complimented Underwood's vocal performance, writing that she "drives home the message of determination and hope".

== Commercial performance ==
"Wasted" become Underwood's fourth consecutive number one country single and fifth overall number one single. It spent three weeks at number one on the country charts, debuting at number 57 on the country charts before its official release. The song also received a significant amount of digital downloads on the iTunes music store after her performance of the song on American Idol. As of October 2011, "Wasted" sold 705,000 copies as of October 2011. On August 10, 2015, "Wasted" was certified Platinum by Recording Industry Association of America.

== Charts ==
Chart (2007)	Peak Position
Canada Hot 100 (Billboard)	35
Canada Country (Billboard)	1
US Billboard Hot 100	37
US Hot Country Songs (Billboard)	1

=== Year-end charts ===
Chart (2007)	Position
US Country Songs (Billboard)	7
