= Maria Arredondo =

Norwegian singer

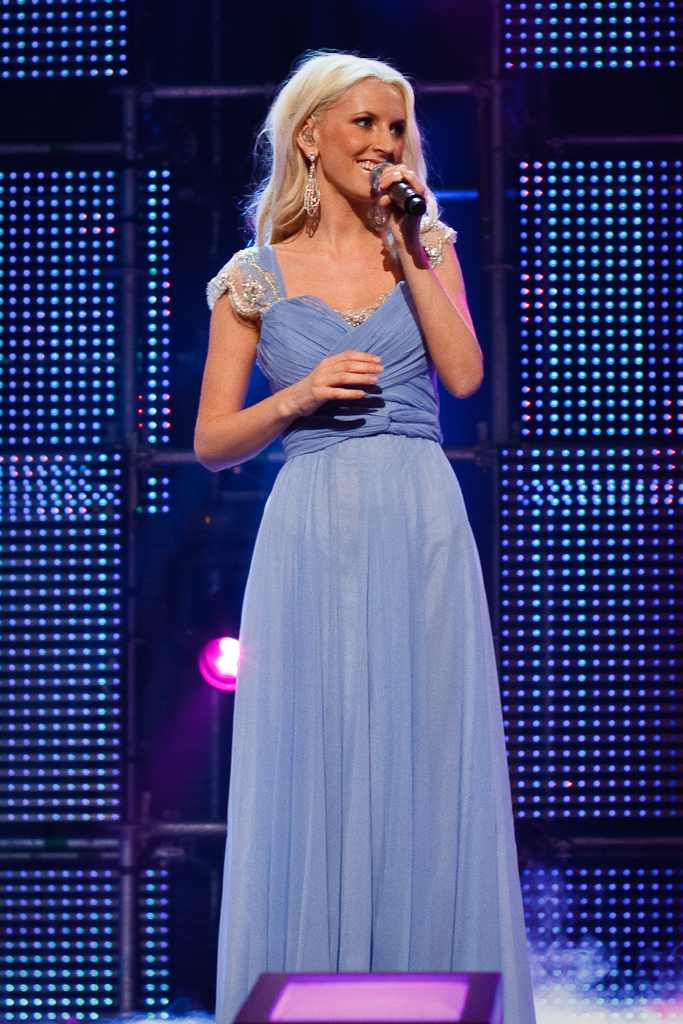

Background information
- Born: 6 July 1985 (age 41); Vennesla Municipality, Norway
- Genres: Pop
- Occupation: Singer
- Years active: 2002–2015?
- Label: Universal Music Norway 2002–
- Website: www.maria-arredondo.net www.maria-arredondo.co.uk

Maria Sødal Arredondo (born 6 July 1985 in Vennesla Municipality, Norway) is a Norwegian pop singer. Her surname Arredondo comes from her Chilean stepfather.

== Career ==
In March 2003, Arredondo released her first album, the self-titled Maria Arredondo by Universal Music Norway. The album was a success in Norway, attaining the highest possible scores from a Norwegian newspaper, VG.

In November 2004, Arredondo released her second album, Not Going Under. This was the first album to have videos for the singles, as Arredondo did not produce any videos for her first album.

Arredondo released a Christmas album, Min Jul with some tracks produced and arranged by Jon Lord of Deep Purple). The track "On Christmas Day" was released as a single. Arredondo's three albums have combined sales of over 150,000.

Arredondo was among the contributors to the song "That Day", along with singers Marit Larsen and Marion Raven, as both members of the pop duo M2M.

On 12 November 2007, she released her fourth album For a Moment. The first single from this album, "Brief and Beautiful" became a major hit throughout the fall. "Brief and Beautiful" was written by Hanne Sørvaag and Harry Sommerdahl, and a Spanish-language adaptation of this song called "Fue para los dos" was released earlier in 2007 by Spanish singer Edurne.

Her fourth album was met with mixed reviews. On the album, "Even when you're with me" is a cover of the Spanish singer Chenoa's "Me Enamoro Del Dolor", and "If You Could Only See Me" was originally recorded by another Norwegian artist called Ina.

Arredondo entered the qualifying rounds of the Melodi Grand Prix 2010 (the Norwegian selection process for the Eurovision Song Contest) on 16 January 2010 and was voted through to the national final, with the song "The Touch", which is written by Rolf Løvland.

Today, in addition to her singing career, Arrendondo works on a 20% basis at the Heggedal church in Asker.

In July 2014, Arrendondo took the leading female role in a musical play titled "Kober Mystery". In November, the planned "Sound Of Music in Concert" was staged for two shows, also starring Arrendondo.

== Musical style ==
Her musical style is a mixture of pop and dream pop very similar to artists such as M2M, Natalie Imbruglia, Michelle Branch, Jewel, and The Cranberries.

== Discography ==
=== Studio albums ===
Year	Album	Chart positions	Certification
Year	Album	VG-lista	Certification
2003	Maria Arredondo	2	Platinum
2004	Not Going Under	7	Platinum
2005	Min Jul (My Christmas)	6	Platinum
2007	For a Moment	12	
2008	Sound of Musicals	28	
2013	Heime Nå (At Home Now)	12	

=== Singles ===
/ : The singles were only released as radio single.
—: The singles did not enter the charts

Year	Single	Chart Positions		Album
Year	Single	VG-lista	Hit40	Album
2002	"Can Let Go"	—	3	Maria Arredondo
2002	"Just A Little Heartache"	10	2	Maria Arredondo
2003	"In Love with an Angel"	1	1	Maria Arredondo
2003	"Hardly Hurts at All"	5	2	Maria Arredondo
2003	"A Thousand Nights"	—	—	Maria Arredondo
2003	"Julekveldsvise" (with Winta, Sølvgut)	—	—	Nå Har Vi Vaske Golvet
2004	"Mad Summer"	3	2	Not Going Under
2004	"Burning"	—	1	Not Going Under
2005	"Cross Every River"	—	—	Not Going Under
2005	"Himmel På Jord"	—	11	Min Jul
2006	"On Christmas Day"	4	—	For A Moment
2007	"Brief and Beautiful"	4	1	For A Moment
2007	"Kyrie Eleison"	—	—	For A Moment
2010	"The Touch"	—	—	Melodi Grand Prix 2010
2013	"Det Jeg Har Gitt Fra Meg"	—	—	Heime Nå
2013	"Heime Nå"	—	—	Heime Nå
2014	"Antenna"	—	—	non-album single

=== Features ===
Year	Single	Chart Positions		Album
Year	Single	VG-lista	Airplay	Album
2009	Ett sår i min själ (with Jan Johansen)	—	—	Minnen
2011	Kimer i klokker (with Torstein Sødal)	—	—	Jul i sør
