= Steve Gulley =

American singer-songwriter (1962–2020)

Steven Muncey Gulley
- Born: September 20, 1962; Cumberland Gap, Tennessee, U.S.
- Died: August 18, 2020 (aged 57); Knoxville, Tennessee, U.S.
- Occupation: Singer-songwriter
- Formerly of: Renfro Valley Barn Dance; Quicksilver; Mountain Heart; Tim Stafford; Dale Ann Bradley; Grasstowne

Steve Gulley (September 20, 1962 – August 18, 2020) was an American singer-songwriter of bluegrass music. He rose to prominence as a cast member at the Renfro Valley Barn Dance in Renfro Valley, Kentucky where he performed bluegrass, country and gospel music from the early 1980's through 1994.

After hearing Steve at Renfro Valley, bluegrass artist Doyle Lawson offered him a position as lead singer and guitarist in the band Quicksilver. He was with Quicksilver from 1994-1996, after which he went on to form and be a founding member and lead singer of award-winning bluegrass bands; Mountain Heart and Grasstowne.

He was a multiple IBMA and SPBGMA award winner who was internationally known for his singing and songwriting in the bluegrass, traditional country and gospel genres. Steve later formed his own group named Steve Gulley & New Pinnacle, who released multiple bluegrass albums from 2015 through 2020 until his death. He was sought after to cowrite or lend his vocals on multiple bluegrass projects, especially his longtime friend bluegrass recording artist Dale Ann Bradley. He recorded two singer/songwriter albums with his longtime writing partner Tim Stafford of Blue Highway and was part of the Bluegrass Allstars band with award winning dobro player, Phil Leadbetter. Steve also sang harmony vocals on multiple tracks of the acclaimed "Sad Songs and Waltzes" album by Keith Whitley.

Steve's wife Debbie and his father Don Gulley were also performers on the historical Renfro Valley Barn Dance and Jamboree. Steve's son Brad Gulley was the lead singer and guitarist for bluegrass group Cumberland River. Steve attributed his love of music came to his father Don, who was a well-known artist, musician, and radio broadcaster in their hometown of Cumberland Gap, Tennessee. Steve's most cherished accomplishments were performing on the Grand Ole Opry and when he received an honorary Doctor of Music from Lincoln Memorial University in Harrogate, Tennessee, only the fourth one given in that field in the school's history, and the first given to a bluegrass musician by the university since Ralph Stanley received his in 1976.
