= Before He Cheats =

2006 single by Carrie Underwood

Single by Carrie Underwood

from the album Some Hearts
- Released: August 2006 (Note: For its August 5, 2006, issue, Billboard reported that Underwood's label Arista Nashville announced "Before He Cheats" as her next single. Billboard called the song the "fourth single from Some Hearts" in its August 19 issue.)
- Studio: FAME (Muscle Shoals, Alabama)
- Genre: Country; country rock
- Length: 3:19
- Label: Arista Nashville
- Songwriters: Josh Kear; Chris Tompkins
- Producer: Mark Bright

Carrie Underwood singles chronology
| "Don't Forget to Remember Me" (2006) | "Before He Cheats" (2006) | "Wasted" (2007) |

Music video
- "Before He Cheats" on YouTube

Alternate cover

"Before He Cheats" is a song by American singer Carrie Underwood from her debut studio album, Some Hearts (2005). Written by Chris Tompkins and Josh Kear, it was released as the fourth single from the album. The song tells the story of a woman taking revenge on her unfaithful partner by vandalizing his car.

The song became an enormous crossover success, topping the Billboard Hot Country Songs chart for five consecutive weeks, reaching the top five on the Billboard Adult Top 40 chart, and becoming a top ten hit on the Billboard Mainstream Top 40 and Adult Contemporary charts. On the Billboard Hot 100 chart, "Before He Cheats" reached number eight and achieved a longevity of 64 consecutive weeks on the chart, making it the eighth longest-charting single in the history of the Hot 100 chart. It also reached number four in Canada.

"Before He Cheats" became the first ever country song to sell over two million digital copies and was once the best-selling country song of all time. It had sold over 4.5 million pure digital downloads by January 2020. It has been certified 11× Platinum by the RIAA, Underwood's largest-selling single to date. It was the sixth best-selling song of 2007 in the US.

The song has received a number of accolades. At the 50th Annual Grammy Awards, Underwood won the Grammy Award for Best Female Country Vocal Performance and the song's writers won the Grammy Award for Best Country Song. It received a nomination for the Grammy Award for Song of the Year as well. It was also named the 2007 Single of the Year by the Country Music Association Awards. It ranked on CMT's 40 Greatest Songs of the Decade at number 25, along with Underwood's other signature hit, "Jesus, Take the Wheel", which ranked number four.

== Background ==
"Before He Cheats" tells the story of a woman taking revenge on her potentially unfaithful boyfriend or husband. It was originally written for Gretchen Wilson before it was recorded by Underwood.

She imagines him hanging out and flirting with a "bleach-blonde" girl, shooting pool, buying her a drink, dancing, and hoping to "get lucky" with her. In retaliation, she vandalizes his customized four-wheel drive vehicle by keying the sides, carving her name into its leather seats, smashing the headlights with a Louisville Slugger baseball bat and slashing all four tires. All of these actions are part of her hopes that this will make him "think before he cheats" again.

Although the song is about a tale of revenge, according to Underwood, while she had been cheated on before, "I wouldn't recommend doing any property damage, though. I'm a 'let it go, move on' kind of person".

"Before He Cheats" is set in the key of F-sharp minor. It has a moderate tempo in cut time with a "shuffle" beat. The song's main chord pattern is F♯m–E–D_{sus}2–C♯, and Underwood's vocals range from F♯3-C♯5.

== Critical reception ==
In 2024, Rolling Stone ranked the song at number 67 on its 200 Greatest Country Songs of All Time ranking.

== Credits and personnel ==
Credits are adapted from the liner notes of Some Hearts.

- Carrie Underwood – lead vocals
- Tom Bukovac – electric guitar
- Lisa Cochran – background vocals
- J. T. Corenflos – electric guitar
- Eric Darken – percussion
- Wes Hightower – background vocals
- Mike Johnson – steel guitar
- Steve Nathan – keyboards
- Jimmie Lee Sloas – bass guitar
- Bryan Sutton – acoustic guitar
- Lonnie Wilson – drums
- Jonathan Yudkin – fiddle

== Music video ==
The music video for "Before He Cheats" was directed by Roman White. In the beginning of the video, Underwood is seen leaving a parking lot brandishing a Louisville Slugger, having just vandalized her husband/boyfriend's truck for cheating on her. In other scenes, the "husband/boyfriend" (portrayed by actor Tabb Shoup) is seen kissing another woman. As the video progresses Underwood takes the stage to sing as various objects behind her, such as lamps, are seen exploding. At one point, a shot of the front seat of the truck is seen with Underwood's name carved in it, which she mentions during the chorus of the song. Eventually, she catches her cheating husband/boyfriend with the other woman. After looking shocked for a second, she scoffs and drops the keys to his now-demolished truck into his drink. Towards the end, Underwood struts down a street, singing along with the song, while different objects are shown flying across the air, glasses are seen shattering, and light bulbs explode, paying homage to Brian De Palma's Carrie. At the very end of the music video, the truck is shown completely destroyed.

The early scenes in the video featuring a crowd in a narrow street and Underwood in a parking garage were filmed in and around Printer's Alley in downtown Nashville, Tennessee. The final scene, featuring the exploding glass and light bulbs, was filmed on Fourth Avenue just north of Church Street in Nashville.

"Before He Cheats" made GAC music video history by debuting at number one. It also marks the third consecutive number-one music video on GAC for Underwood. It made history on CMT's Top Twenty Countdown for being at number one for five consecutive weeks. In December 2006, "Before He Cheats" was named the best video of 2006 by CMT's Top 20 Countdown. It also finished number two in GAC's Video of the Year for 2006 behind Trace Adkins's "Honky Tonk Badonkadonk". Proving its crossover success, the video made a debut at number 15 on the VSpot Top 20 Countdown, peaking at number 4.

The video premiered on MTV's Total Request Live in April 2007. This was the second country music video to be premiered on the program, the first being "These Boots Are Made for Walkin'" by Jessica Simpson.

On April 16, 2007, the video for "Before He Cheats" swept the CMT Music Awards, winning three categories: Video of the Year, Female Video of the Year, and Director of the Year. Underwood made history by being the first female to win Video of the Year.

The video also garnered Underwood a nomination for Music Video of the Year at the 2007 Country Music Association Awards and a nomination for a 2007 MTV Video Music Award in the category of Best New Artist.

The music video was ranked number nine on CMT's 100 Greatest Videos. It also ranked number one on GAC's Top 50 Videos of the 2000s.

In 2009, the music video for the song was voted number one by fans as VH1's Greatest Diva Music Video of all-time, before the airing of the annual VH1 Divas Live special.

== Commercial performance ==
"Before He Cheats" first appeared on the charts in February 2006. Although it had not at that point been released as a single, many country stations began giving the song unsolicited airplay, leading it to debut on the Billboard Hot Country Songs chart at number 59. By the time the song was officially released as Some Hearts' third single in August of that year, it had already racked up 20 non-consecutive weeks on the chart, reaching as high as number 49. After the official release, the song climbed the country charts quickly, reaching number one in November and remaining there for five weeks. This was Underwood's third consecutive number one country single and fourth number one single overall. It also managed to debut on the Billboard Hot 100 chart at number 92, and by November, it had reached number 16 on that chart. By the end of 2006, the song began to slowly descend the charts, and it had appeared the single had peaked.

However, pop radio began to take notice of the song in February 2007, around the time of Underwood's Grammy Award wins. As the single increased its top 40 airplay, it began to rebound on the Hot 100 chart. The new airplay, along with attention from numerous award show wins for the song, such as favorite country song at the 2007 People's Choice Awards in January and Video of the Year at the 2007 CMTs in April, reinvigorated digital sales as well. When it finally peaked at number 8 in May 2007, it had already logged 38 weeks on the chart, making it the longest trek to the top 10 ever; the song held the record for 14 years. As pop airplay began dying down, the song got a third life on the adult contemporary format, which began playing the song in May. "Before He Cheats" spent 64 consecutive weeks on the Hot 100 chart before finally falling off in late November 2007. The song is one of the longest-charting hits in Billboard history, and was the third longest-running hit of the 2000s decade.

"Before He Cheats" was ranked sixth on the 2007 Hot 100 Year-end chart and fifth on the 2007 Hot 100 Airplay Year-end chart by Billboard. It was also ranked tenth on the 2007 Adult Contemporary Year-end chart. The song sold over two million in digital sales in December 2007, and was certified 2× Platinum by the RIAA in February 2008, making it the first country song to achieve this feat. It was the best-selling single from an American Idol contestant until Kelly Clarkson's "Stronger (What Doesn't Kill You)" surpassed it in the spring of 2012, and is still Underwood's best-selling single to date. It has sold over one million ringtones. On October 30, 2025, the song was certified 11× Platinum by the RIAA. In Canada, it was certified Platinum. Despite not charting in the United Kingdom, "Before He Cheats" received a multi-platinum certification from the British Phonographic Industry in March 2025 for sales and streams exceeding 1,200,000.

The song has sold 4,483,000 digital downloads in the United States as of January 2020, and it is the third best-selling song by an American Idol contestant in the United States (behind Phillip Phillips' "Home" and Kelly Clarkson's "Stronger (What Doesn't Kill You)"). It is also the eighth best-selling country song in the US. On January 16, 2014, "Before He Cheats" entered the Irish Singles Chart at number 98, becoming Underwood's first appearance on that chart. On December 31, 2015, the song was performed live along with "Smoke Break" and "Heartbeat" on Dick Clark's New Year's Rockin' Eve.

== Cover versions ==
- R&B singer Joe performed a cover version of the song as a Pepsi Smash exclusive on Yahoo! Music. He changed the lyrics to fit a male's perspective and titled his version "Before I Cheat".
- On the second annual Idol Gives Back special, Teri Hatcher and Band from TV covered the song. The performance takes place after a scene in which Hatcher's TV husband (James Denton) fixes Underwood's sink, prompting Hatcher to then "steal her song" because Underwood "tried to steal her man".
- In 2010, Adrianne Leon sang a cover version on the American soap opera General Hospital while portraying Brook Lynn Ashton.
- Jennifer Love Hewitt performed the song on the second episode of the first season of The Client List.
- In 2013, Sasha Allen performed the song on The Voice.
- Ana Gasteyer released a jazz cover of the song on her 2014 debut album.
- In the movie Pitch Perfect 2, the song is performed during the Riff-off by the Barden Bellas.

== Other versions ==
At the 2017 CMA Awards, Brad Paisley and Underwood performed "Before He Tweets", which made fun of President Donald Trump.

== Accolades ==
Awards and nominations for "Before He Cheats"
| Ceremony | Year (Note: Indicates the year of ceremony. Each year is linked to the article about the awards held that year, wherever possible.) | Category | Result | Ref. |
|---|---|---|---|---|
| Academy of Country Music Awards | 2007 | Single Record of the Year | Nominated | |
| Academy of Country Music Awards | 2007 | Song of the Year | Nominated | |
| Academy of Country Music Awards | 2007 | Video of the Year | Won | |
| ASCAP Country Music Awards | 2007 | Most-Performed Songs of the Year | Won | |
| ASCAP Country Music Awards | 2007 | Song of the Year | Won (Note: Tied with Dave Berg for "If You're Going Through Hell (Before the Devil Even Knows)" (2006).) | |
| CMT Music Awards | 2007 | Female Video of the Year | Won | |
| CMT Music Awards | 2007 | Video of the Year | Won | |
| CMT Music Awards | 2007 | Video Director of the Year | Won | |
| CMT Teddy Awards | 2012 | Best Cheating Video | Won | |
| Country Music Association Awards | 2007 | Music Video of the Year | Won | |
| Country Music Association Awards | 2007 | Single of the Year | Won | |
| Country Music Association Awards | 2007 | Song of the Year | Nominated | |
| Grammy Awards | 2008 | Best Country Song | Won | |
| Grammy Awards | 2008 | Best Female Country Vocal Performance | Won | |
| Grammy Awards | 2008 | Song of the Year | Nominated | |
| People's Choice Awards | 2007 | Favorite Country Song | Won | |
| Teen Choice Awards | 2007 | Choice Music: Payback Track | Nominated | |

== Charts ==
=== Weekly charts ===
Weekly chart performance for "Before He Cheats"
| Chart (2006–2014) | Peak position |
|---|---|
| Canada Hot 100 (Billboard) | 4 |
| Canada AC (Billboard) | 8 |
| Canada CHR/Top 40 (Billboard) | 8 |
| Canada Country (Billboard) | 1 |
| Canada Hot AC (Billboard) | 2 |
| Ireland (IRMA) | 98 |
| US Billboard Hot 100 | 8 |
| US Adult Contemporary (Billboard) | 6 |
| US Adult Pop Airplay (Billboard) | 5 |
| US Hot Country Songs (Billboard) | 1 |
| US Pop Airplay (Billboard) | 9 |

=== Year-end charts ===
2006 year-end chart performance for "Before He Cheats"
| Chart (2006) | Position |
|---|---|
| US Country Songs (Billboard) | 37 |

2007 year-end chart performance for "Before He Cheats"
| Chart (2007) | Position |
|---|---|
| US Billboard Hot 100 | 6 |
| US Adult Contemporary (Billboard) | 8 |
| US Adult Top 40 (Billboard) | 16 |
| US Country Songs (Billboard) | 51 |

== Certifications ==
Certifications for "Before He Cheats"
| Region | Certification | Certified units/sales |
|---|---|---|
| Canada (Music Canada) | Platinum | 40,000^{*} |
| Canada (Music Canada) Ringtone | Gold | 20,000^{*} |
| Denmark (IFPI Danmark) | Gold | 45,000^{‡} |
| New Zealand (RMNZ) | 3× Platinum | 90,000^{‡} |
| United Kingdom (BPI) | 2× Platinum | 1,200,000^{‡} |
| United States (RIAA) | 11× Platinum | 11,000,000^{‡} |
| United States (RIAA) Mastertone | Platinum | 1,000,000^{*} |
^{*} Sales figures based on certification alone.^{‡} Sales+streaming figures based on certification alone.

== Release history ==
Release dates and formats for "Before He Cheats"
| Region | Date | Format | Label | Ref. |
|---|---|---|---|---|
| United States | August 2006 | Country radio | Arista Nashville | |
| United States | March 27, 2007 | Contemporary hit radio | Arista; Arista Nashville; RMG | |
| United States | October 23, 2007 | Ringle | Arista | |
