= Jim Van Cleve =

- Born: James David Van Cleve; October 12, 1978 (age 47); Sarasota, Florida, USA
- Instrument: Fiddle
- Member of: Appalachian Road Show
- Formerly of: Mountain Heart

James David Van Cleve is an American fiddle player, songwriter, session musician, and producer. He is a founding member of the band Mountain Heart, and a Grammy winning session musician and Grammy-nominated solo artist. He is founding member of the band, Appalachian Road Show.

Among the list of artists performed and or recorded with are: Carrie Underwood, The Band Perry, Bailey Zimmerman, Zach Top, Sara Evans, Dolly Parton, Merle Haggard, Willie Nelson, Linda Rhondstat, Josh Turner, Rhonda Vincent, Glen Campbell, Montgomery Gentry, Doyle Lawson, Tony Rice, Emmy Lou Harris, Rodney Crowell, Patty Loveless, Johnny Cash, Alison Krauss, Vassar Clements, Ricky Skaggs, Sam Bush, Jerry Douglas, Sierra Hull, Bryan Sutton, Chris Thile, Doc Watson, and Darrell Scott

== Early life ==
Jim Van Cleve was born October 12, 1978, in Sarasota, Florida. He won many fiddle contests as a youth. While still in high school, Van Cleve became a member of Ric-o-chet and Lou Reid and Carolina, prominent bands in the national bluegrass scene at the time.

In 1997, bluegrass and gospel legend Doyle Lawson invited Van Cleve to join his group, Quicksilver. Van Cleve left college (UNC-Greensboro) to become the band's new fiddle player.

== Mountain Heart ==
In 1998, banjo player Barry Abernathy, singer/guitarist Steve Gulley, and Grammy-winning mandolinist (formerly of Alison Krauss and Union Station) Adam Steffey began plans to form a band. Van Cleve came on board and the band Mountain Heart was formed. Van Cleve has played a major role in the success and popularity of the band, as well as a driving force in creating more complex musical arrangements. He left the band in April 2014.

== Discography ==
=== With Mountain Heart ===
- Mountain Heart (1999)
- The Journey (2001)
- No Other Way (2002)
- Force of Nature (2004)
- Wide Open (2006)
- The Road That Never Ends (The Live Album) (2007)
- That Just Happened (2010)

=== Solo ===
- No Apologies (2006)

=== Producer ===
Jim is known as a session musician and as a record producer in the worlds of Country and Americana music. Van Cleve has built a broad-ranging body of production work. Besides producing Mountain Heart's That Just Happened and his solo album, he has produced work by Cindy G, Carrie Hassler And Hard Rain, and Clay Jones

=== Other work ===
In 2008, Van Cleve was recruited to write and record a new Awards Show Theme Song by the IBMA (an honor previously held by the 12-time Grammy winner, Jerry Douglas, and Nashville recording legend, Mark O'Connor before him). The new theme song, "Road From Rosine" was debuted at the 2007 IBMA Awards Show at the Ryman Auditorium in Nashville.

Jim was recruited to write an instrumental track for a studio project by Sierra Hull. Ron Block (of Alison Krauss and Union Station), and Sierra produced her debut solo project and commissioned Jim to write the song, which eventually was entitled "Smashville".

== Awards ==
=== International Bluegrass Music Association ===
- The awards nominations for "No Apologies" were many. The lead track, "Nature of the Beast", was nominated for a Grammy Award in 2006 for "Best Country Instrumental Performance". The first single from the album, Let The Big Dog Eat, was the No. 1 Song in Bluegrass Unlimited Magazine for three months. The album topped out at number 5 in the Billboard Bluegrass Sales chart. The project won "Album of the Year" in the Folk category of the Indie Awards. The album was nominated for "Instrumental Project of the Year" in 2007 at the International Bluegrass Music Association (IBMA) Awards. Jim was also nominated for "Fiddle Player of the Year" in 2007 for his work on "No Apologies", and the many other recordings he played a part in that year.
- 2006 Album of the Year: Celebration of Life: Musicians Against Childhood Cancer, featuring 3 Fox Drive, Lonesome River Band, The Seldom Scene, Rhonda Vincent & The Rage, Cherryholmes, J.D. Crowe & The New South, BlueRidge, IIIrd Tyme Out, The James King Band, Larry Cordle, Wayne Benson, Clay Hess, Greg Luck, Aubrey Haynie, Marty Raybon & Full Circle, Tony Rice, Ronnie Bowman & The Committee, The Larry Stephenson Band, Blue Highway, Gena Britt, Randy Kohrs & The Lites, Steve Thomas, Scott Vestal, David Parmley & Continental Divide, Karl Shiflett & the Big Country Show, Kenny & Amanda Smith, Wildfire, Doyle Lawson & Quicksilver, Lost & Found, The Grascals, Alecia Nugent, Carl Jackson, Jerry Salley, Don Rigsby & Midnight Call, Bradley Walker, Dan Tyminski, Bela Fleck, Barry Bales, Joe Mullins, Bryan Sutton, Jim VanCleve, Clay Jones & Keith Garrett.
- 2012 Recorded Event of the Year: Carl Jackson, Ronnie Bowman, Larry Cordle, Jerry Salley, Rickey Wasson, Randy Kohrs, D.A. Adkins, Garnet Bowman, Lynn Butler, Ashley Kohrs, Gary Payne, Dale Pyatt, Clay Hess, Alan Bibey, Jay Weaver, Ron Stewart & Jim Van Cleve for "Life Goes On".
