= Steve Earle discography =

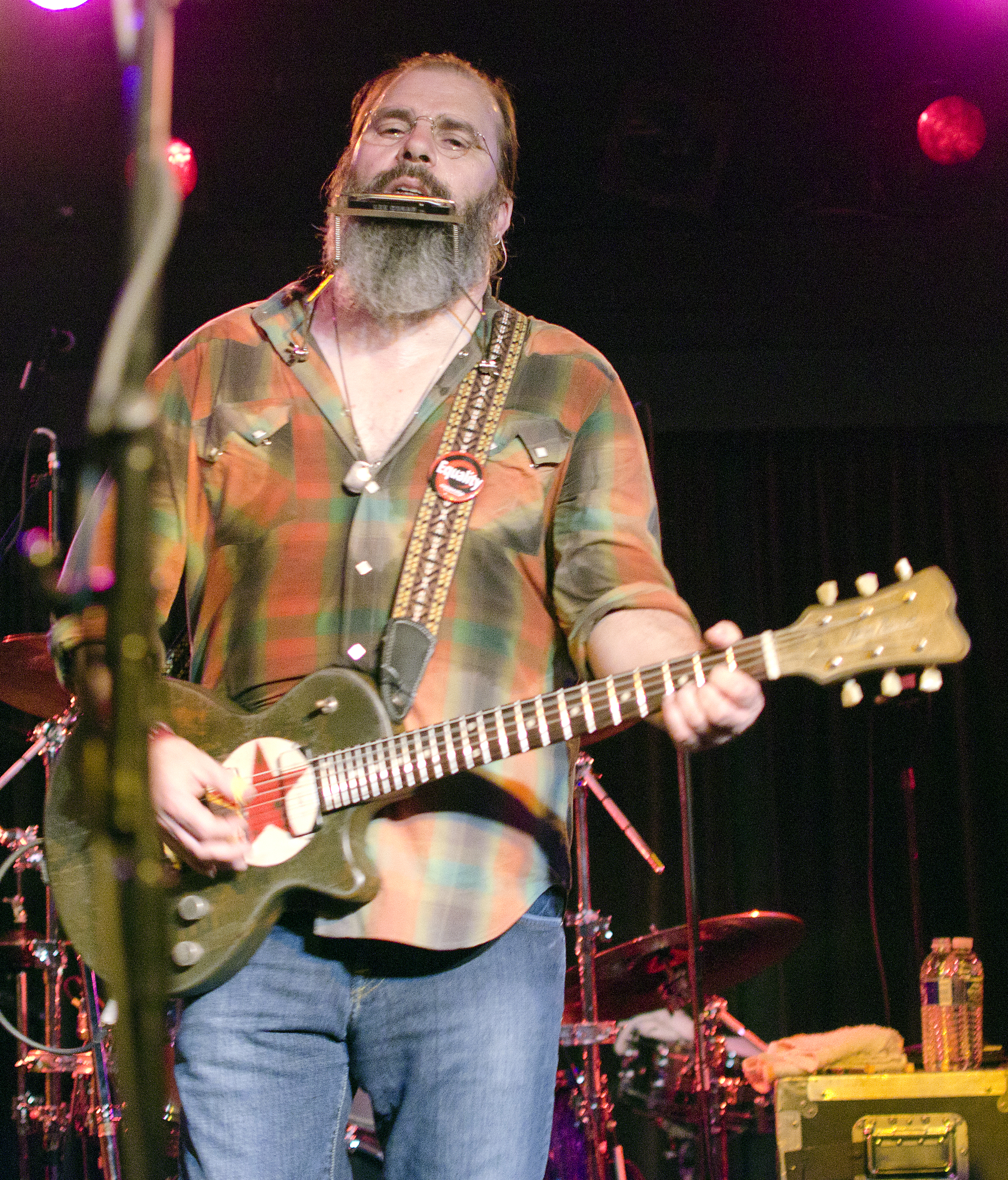
- Earle performing in 2011
- Studio albums: 21
- Live albums: 6
- Compilation albums: 8
- Singles: 32
- Music videos: 20

American musician Steve Earle has released twenty-one studio albums, including collaborations with the Del McCoury Band and Shawn Colvin. Earle's work reflects a wide range of styles, including country, bluegrass, roots rock, and folk. He or his labels have also released six live albums and eight compilation albums.

Earle has charted several singles on the Billboard Hot Country Songs, Mainstream Rock Airplay, Adult Alternative Airplay charts.

== Studio albums ==
=== 1980s ===
| Title | Album details | Peak positions | | | | | | | Certifications |
| Title | Album details | US Country | US | AUS | CAN Country | CAN | NZ | UK | Certifications |
|---|---|---|---|---|---|---|---|---|---|
| Guitar Town | Release date: March 5, 1986; Label: MCA Records; Formats: CD, LP, cassette | 1 | 89 | — | — | 82 | — | — | CAN: Platinum; US: Gold |
| Exit 0 | Release date: May 18, 1987; Label: MCA Records; Formats: CD, LP, cassette | 15 | 90 | — | — | 36 | — | — | CAN: Gold |
| Copperhead Road | Release date: October 17, 1988; Label: MCA Records; Formats: CD, LP, cassette | 7 | 56 | 39 | 30 | 14 | 17 | 42 | CAN: 3× Platinum; US: Gold |
"—" denotes releases that did not chart

=== 1990s ===
| Title | Album details | Peak positions | | | | | | | | | Certifications |
| Title | Album details | US Country | US | AUS | CAN Country | CAN | NZ | SWE | SWI | UK | Certifications |
|---|---|---|---|---|---|---|---|---|---|---|---|
| The Hard Way (with the Dukes) | Release date: July 1, 1990; Label: MCA Records; Formats: CD, LP, cassette | — | 100 | 28 | — | 14 | 4 | 34 | 40 | — | CAN: Platinum |
| Train a Comin' | Release date: February 28, 1995; Label: Warner Bros. Records; Formats: CD, cassette | — | — | — | — | — | — | — | — | — | |
| I Feel Alright | Release date: May 5, 1996; Label: Warner Bros. Records; Formats: CD, cassette | — | 106 | — | — | 38 | 29 | 26 | — | 44 | |
| El Corazón | Release date: October 7, 1997; Label: Warner Bros. Records; Formats: CD, cassette | — | 126 | — | — | — | — | 19 | — | 59 | |
| The Mountain (with Del McCoury Band) | Release date: February 23, 1999; Label: E-Squared; Formats: CD, LP, cassette | 19 | 133 | 93 | 14 | — | — | — | — | — | |
"—" denotes releases that did not chart

=== 2000s ===
| Title | Album details | Peak positions | | | | | | | |
| Title | Album details | US Country | US | US Indie | CAN Country | CAN | NZ | SWE | UK |
|---|---|---|---|---|---|---|---|---|---|
| Transcendental Blues | Release date: June 6, 2000; Label: E-Squared Records; Formats: CD, cassette | 5 | 66 | — | 8 | 28 | — | 27 | 32 |
| Jerusalem | Release date: September 24, 2002; Label: E-Squared/Artemis Records; Formats: CD | 7 | 59 | 1 | — | — | — | 24 | — |
| The Revolution Starts Now | Release date: August 24, 2004; Label: E-Squared/Artemis Records; Formats: CD, music download | 12 | 89 | 7 | — | — | — | 20 | 66 |
| Washington Square Serenade | Release date: September 25, 2007; Label: New West Records; Formats: CD, LP, music download | 10 | 79 | 10 | — | — | — | 28 | 55 |
| Townes | Release date: May 12, 2009; Label: New West Records; Formats: CD, music download | 6 | 19 | 2 | — | — | 34 | 24 | 37 |
"—" denotes releases that did not chart

=== 2010s ===
| Title | Album details | Peak positions | | | | | | | | | Sales |
| Title | Album details | US Country | US | US Folk | US Indie | US Rock | AUS | CAN | SWE | UK | Sales |
|---|---|---|---|---|---|---|---|---|---|---|---|
| I'll Never Get Out of This World Alive | Release date: April 26, 2011; Label: New West Records; Formats: CD, LP, music download | 4 | 24 | 4 | 4 | 7 | — | 17 | 16 | 28 | |
| The Low Highway | Release date: April 16, 2013; Label: New West Records; Formats: CD, LP, music download | 12 | 39 | 4 | 10 | — | — | — | — | 30 | |
| Terraplane (with the Dukes) | Release date: February 17, 2015; Label: New West Records; Formats: CD, LP, music download | 3 | 39 | 2 | 3 | 6 | 58 | — | — | 30 | |
| Colvin & Earle (with Shawn Colvin) | Release date: June 10, 2016; Label: Fantasy; Formats: CD, LP, music download | 13 | 128 | 8 | — | 16 | — | — | — | — | |
| So You Wannabe an Outlaw | Release date: June 16, 2017; Label: Warner; Formats: CD, LP, music download | 15 | 102 | 5 | — | — | — | — | — | 48 | US: 12,800 |
| Guy | Release date: March 29, 2019; Label: New West; Formats: CD, LP, music download | 14 | 107 | 4 | 2 | 17 | — | — | — | 49 | US: 9,800 |
"—" denotes releases that did not chart

=== 2020s ===
| Title | Album details | Peak chart positions | | | | | |
| Title | Album details | US Country | US Folk | US Indie | US Rock | AUS | UK |
|---|---|---|---|---|---|---|---|
| Ghosts of West Virginia (with the Dukes) | Release date: May 21, 2020; Label: New West; Formats: CD, LP, music download | 44 | 8 | 36 | 48 | — | 61 |
| J.T. (with the Dukes) | Release date: January 4, 2021 (Note: J.T. was initially released to digital platforms on January 4, 2021, in honor of what would have been Justin Townes Earle's 39th birthday. CD and LP versions followed on March 19, 2021.); Label: New West; Formats: CD, LP, music download | — | — | — | — | 49 | — |
| Jerry Jeff (with the Dukes) | Release date: May 27, 2022; Label: New West; Formats: CD, LP, music download | — | — | — | — | — | — |
"—" denotes releases that did not chart

== Live albums ==
| Title | Album details | Peak positions | |
| Title | Album details | US Country | US Indie |
|---|---|---|---|
| Shut Up and Die Like an Aviator | Release date: September 17, 1991; Label: MCA Records; Formats: CD, Double-LP, cassette | — | — |
| BBC Radio 1 Live in Concert | Release date: December 11, 1992; Label: Windsong International Records; Formats: CD, cassette | — | — |
| Together at the Bluebird Café (with Townes Van Zandt and Guy Clark) | Release date: October 9, 2001; Label: American Originals; Formats: CD | — | — |
| Just an American Boy | Release date: September 9, 2003; Label: E-Squared/Artemis Records; Formats: CD | 43 | 35 |
| Live from Austin, TX | Release date: November 2, 2004; Label: New West Records; Formats: CD, music download | — | — |
| Live at Montreux 2005 | Release date: July 11, 2006; Label: Eagle Records; Formats: CD, music download | — | — |
| Alone Again (Live) | Release date: July 12, 2024 | — | — |
"—" denotes releases that did not chart

== Compilation albums ==
| Title | Album details | Peak positions | | | |
| Title | Album details | US Country | US | US Indie | AUS |
|---|---|---|---|---|---|
| Early Tracks | Release date: 1987; Label: Epic Records; Formats: LP, CD, cassette | — | — | — | — |
| Essential Steve Earle | Release date: March 2, 1993; Label: MCA Records; Formats: CD, cassette | — | — | — | — |
| Fearless Heart | Release date: 1995; Label: MCA Special Products; Formats: CD | — | — | — | — |
| Ain't Ever Satisfied: The Steve Earle Collection | Release date: July 30, 1996; Label: Hip-O Records; Formats: CD, cassette | — | — | — | — |
| Angry Young Man: The Very Best of Steve Earle | Release date: April 20, 1999; Label: Universal International; Formats: CD, cassette | — | — | — | — |
| The Devil's Right Hand: An Introduction to Steve Earle | Release date: May 8, 2001; Label: Universal International; Formats: CD | — | — | — | — |
| Side Tracks | Release date: April 9, 2002; Label: E-Squared/Artemis Records; Formats: CD | 9 | 109 | 6 | 82 |
| The Collection | Release date: 2002; Label: Spectrum Music; Formats: CD | — | — | — | — |
| 20th Century Masters - The Millennium Collection: The Best of Steve Earle | Release date: August 19, 2003; Label: MCA Records; Formats: CD | — | — | — | — |
"—" denotes releases that did not chart

== Singles ==
=== 1980s ===
| Year | Single | Peak positions | | | | | Album |
| Year | Single | US Country | US Main. Rock | CAN Country | AUS | UK | Album |
|---|---|---|---|---|---|---|---|
| 1983 | "Nothin' But You" | 70 | — | — | — | — | Non-album singles |
| 1983 | "Squeeze Me In" | — | — | — | — | — | Non-album singles |
| 1984 | "What'll You Do About Me" | 76 | — | — | — | — | Non-album singles |
| 1985 | "A Little Bit in Love" | — | — | — | — | — | Non-album singles |
| 1986 | "Hillbilly Highway" | 37 | — | 46 | — | — | Guitar Town |
| 1986 | "Guitar Town" | 7 | — | 7 | — | — | Guitar Town |
| 1986 | "Someday" | 28 | — | 31 | — | — | Guitar Town |
| 1987 | "Goodbye's All We've Got Left" | 8 | — | 10 | — | — | Guitar Town |
| 1987 | "I Ain't Ever Satisfied" | — | 26 | — | — | — | Exit 0 |
| 1987 | "Nowhere Road" | 20 | — | 7 | — | — | Exit 0 |
| 1987 | "Sweet Little '66" | 37 | — | 19 | — | — | Exit 0 |
| 1988 | "Copperhead Road" | — (Note: "Copperhead Road" did not chart on Hot Country Songs, but reached number nine on Country Digital Song Sales in 2021.) | 10 | — | 23 | 45 | Copperhead Road |
| 1988 | "Back to the Wall" | — | 20 | — | 115 | — | Copperhead Road |
| 1988 | "Johnny Come Lately" | — | — | — | — | 75 | Copperhead Road |
| 1988 | "Six Days on the Road" | 29 | — | 33 | — | — | Planes, Trains and Automobiles |
"—" denotes releases that did not chart

=== 1990s ===
| Year | Single | Peak positions | | | | Album |
| Year | Single | US Main. Rock | AUS | CAN | UK | Album |
|---|---|---|---|---|---|---|
| 1990 | "The Other Kind" | 37 | 111 | 29 | 88 | The Hard Way |
| 1990 | "Justice in Ontario" | — | 85 | — | 91 | The Hard Way |
| 1996 | "I Feel Alright" | — | — | — | — | I Feel Alright |
| 1996 | "More Than I Can Do" | — | 39 | — | — | I Feel Alright |
| 1997 | "Telephone Road" | — | — | — | — | El Corazón |
| 1997 | "Johnny Too Bad" (with The V-Roys) | — | — | — | 82 | Non-album single |
"—" denotes releases that did not chart

=== 2000s–present ===
| Year | Single | Peak positions | Album |
| Year | Single | US AAA | Album |
|---|---|---|---|
| 2000 | "Transcendental Blues" | 18 | Transcendental Blues |
| 2000 | "I Can Wait" | 39 | Transcendental Blues |
| 2002 | "Some Dreams" | — | Side Tracks |
| 2002 | "Jerusalem" | — | Jerusalem |
| 2004 | "The Revolution Starts Now" | 15 | The Revolution Starts Now |
| 2005 | "Rich Man's War" | — | The Revolution Starts Now |
| 2007 | "City of Immigrants" | — | Washington Square Serenade |
| 2008 | "Days Aren't Long Enough" (with Allison Moorer) | — | Washington Square Serenade |
| 2011 | "I'll Never Get Out of This World Alive" | — | I'll Never Get Out of This World Alive |
| 2011 | "Every Part of Me" | — | I'll Never Get Out of This World Alive |
| 2013 | "Invisible" | — | The Low Highway |
| 2013 | "21st Century Blues" | — | The Low Highway |
| 2015 | "Mississippi, It's Time" | — | Non-album singles |
| 2017 | "Fixin' to Die" / "Are You Sure Hank Done It This Way" (live) | — | Non-album singles |
| 2022 | "Mr. Bojangles" (with the Dukes) | — | Non-album singles |
"—" denotes releases that did not chart

== Videography ==
=== Video albums ===
| Year | Title |
|---|---|
| 2002 | Transcendental Blues |
| 2004 | Just an American Boy |
| 2004 | Live from Austin, TX 1986 |
| 2005 | 20th Century Masters - The DVD Collection |
| 2006 | Live at Montreux 2005 |
| 2008 | Live from Austin, TX 2000 |

=== Music videos ===
| Year | Title | Director |
|---|---|---|
| 1986 | "Guitar Town" | Gerry Wenner |
| 1986 | "Someday" | Jim Hershleder |
| 1987 | "I Ain't Ever Satisfied" | Jim Hershleder |
| 1987 | "Nowhere Road" | Jim Hershleder |
| 1988 | "Copperhead Road" | Tony Vanden Ende |
| 1989 | "Back to the Wall" | Meiert Avis |
| 1990 | "The Other Kind" | Damian Harris |
| 1991 | "Billy Austin" | Christopher Cleveland/Michael Salomon |
| 1996 | "I Feel Alright" | Jim Hershleder/Deaton Flanigen |
| 1998 | "Telephone Road" | Jim Hershleder/Deaton Flanigen |
| 2000 | "Transcendental Blues" | Amos Poe |
| 2001 | "I Don't Want to Lose You Yet" | Dennis Saunders |
| 2002 | "Some Dreams" | Trey Fanjoy |
| 2002 | "Jerusalem" | Maripol & Amos Poe |
| 2003 | "What's So Funny About Peace, Love and Understanding" | |
| 2005 | "Rich Man's War" | Jonathan Demme |
| 2007 | "City of Immigrants" | Alex Peacock |
| 2013 | "Invisible" | Tim Blake Nelson |
| 2015 | "You're the Best Lover That I Ever Had" | Alexander Peacock |
| 2015 | "Mississippi, It's Time" | |
| 2017 | "Lookin' For A Woman" | Cody Ground |
| 2017 | "So You Wannabe An Outlaw" | Cody Ground |
