= Ronnie McCoury =

American mandolin player (born 1967)

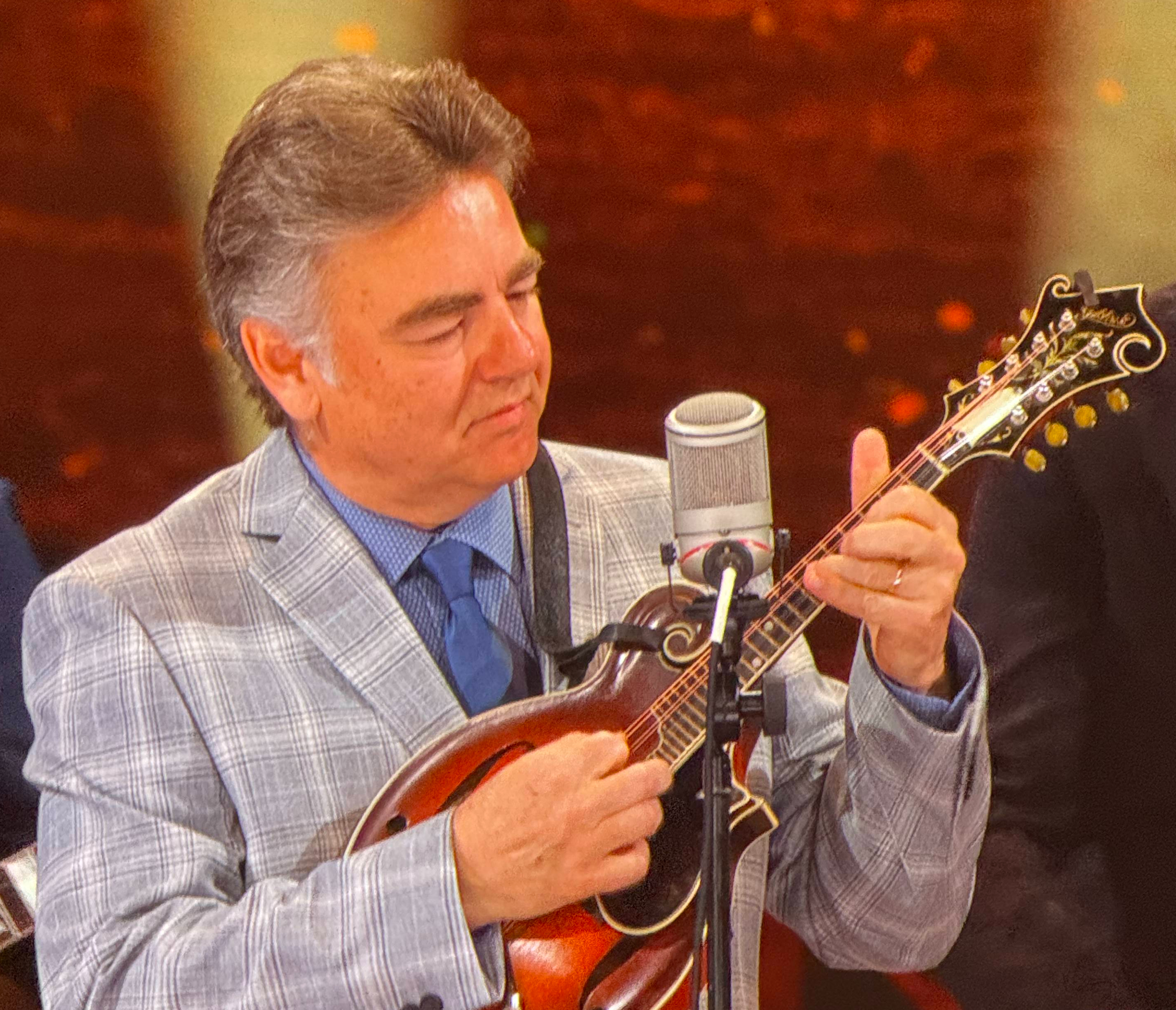
- McCoury performing at the Grand Ole Opry in 2025

Background information
- Born: Ronald Delano McCoury; March 16, 1967 (age 59); York County, Pennsylvania, U.S.
- Genres: Bluegrass
- Occupations: Vocalist, mandolinist, songwriter, producer
- Instrument: Mandolin
- Years active: 1981–present
- Labels: McCoury Music, Rounder

Ronald Delano McCoury (born March 16, 1967), known as Ronnie McCoury, is an American mandolin player, singer, and songwriter. He is the son of bluegrass musician Del McCoury, and is best known for his work with the Del McCoury Band and the Travelin' McCourys.

== Biography ==
Ronnie McCoury was born in York County, Pennsylvania on March 16, 1967.

He was exposed to bluegrass from a young age, as his father had his own band, Del McCoury & the Dixie Pals. Ronnie lists his musical influences as Bill Monroe, David Grisman, Sam Bush, Jerry Douglas, Alan O'Bryant, and the Osborne Brothers.

At the age of 9 he started taking violin lessons. He took lessons for two years before giving the violin up for sports.

When he was 13, after seeing Bill Monroe perform, he decided to try the mandolin. He practiced it for six months before his dad invited him to join the Del McCoury Band in 1981.

He has been named the International Bluegrass Music Association mandolin player of the year eight consecutive years from 1993-2000.

McCoury graduated from Susquehannock High School in 1985, and in 2009 he and his brother Rob both won the High School's Distinguished Alumni Award.

=== Recordings ===
In 1995 he and his brother Rob McCoury released a self-titled CD on Rounder Records.

In 1999, he teamed up with David Grisman to release "Mandolin Extravaganza" on the Acoustic Disc label. This CD was nominated for a Grammy Award and also won Instrumental Album of the Year and Recorded Event of the Year at the IBMA awards show in October 2000.

2000 also brought along with it McCoury's first solo project, Heartbreak Town. Along with members of the Del McCoury Band, the album is supported by appearances from Jerry Douglas, David Grisman, Bela Fleck, and Stuart Duncan.

He has also recorded with a number of artists including Garth Brooks, Jack Clement, Charley Pride, Crystal Gayle, Jeff Foxworthy, and Martina McBride.

As a producer he has co-produced most of father's albums since 1996. He has also co-produced The Bluegrass Extravaganza with David Grisman, and Steve Earle. Co-produced The Mountain (Steve Earle album) with Steve Earle.

=== Personal life ===
McCoury currently lives in Nashville, Tennessee. He is married to Allison Bliss, and has two sons and a daughter.

== Discography ==
=== Solo recordings ===
- 2000: Heartbreak Town (Rounder)

=== With Rob McCoury ===
- 1995: Ronnie & Rob McCoury (Rounder)

=== With The Del McCoury Band ===
- 1992: Blue Side Of Town (Rounder)
- 1993: A Deeper Shade Of Blue (Rounder)
- 1996: The Cold Hard Facts (Rounder)
- 1999: The Family (Ceili Music)
- 2001: Del And The Boys (Ceili Music)
- 2003: It's Just the Night (McCoury Music)
- 2005: The Company We Keep (McCoury Music / Sugar Hill)
- 2006: The Promised Land (McCoury Music)
- 2008: Moneyland (McCoury Music)
- 2009: Family Circle (McCoury Music)
- 2011: American Legacies with Preservation Hall Jazz Band (McCoury Music)
- 2011: Old Memories: The Songs of Bill Monroe (McCoury Music)
- 2013: The Streets of Baltimore (McCoury Music)
- 2016: Del And Wood (McCoury Music)

=== As primary contributor ===
- 1995: Various Artists: A Picture Of Hank: The New Bluegrass Way (Mercury Nashville) - track 10, "(I Heard That) Lonesome Whistle"
- 2011: Audie Blaylock and Redline - I'm Going Back to Old Kentucky: A Bill Monroe Celebration (Rural Rhythm)

=== As guest musician ===
- 1985: Del McCoury and the Dixie Pals -Sawmill (Rebel)
- 1985: Tony Trischka - Hill Country (Rounder)
- 1990: Del McCoury - Don't Stop The Music (Rounder)
- 1990: The Lynn Morris Band - The Lynn Morris Band (Rounder)
- 1994: Dolly Parton - Heartsongs: Live from Home (Blue Eye / Columbia)
- 1995: David Olney - High, Wide And Lonesome (Philo / Rounder)
- 1995: Tamra Rosanes - Country Roots (Medley)
- 1996: Jeff Foxworthy - Crank It Up - The Music Album (Warner Bros.)
- 1996: John Hartford - John Hartford Fiddles Wild Hog In The Red Brush (And A Bunch Of Others You Might Not Have Heard) (Rounder)
- 1997: Jason Carter - On The Move (Rounder)
- 1997: Steve Earle - El Corazón (E-Squared / Warner Bros.)
- 1998: The GrooveGrass Boyz - GrooveGrass 101 (Reprise)
- 1998: Del McCoury, Doc Watson, Mac Wiseman - Mac, Doc & Del (Sugar Hill)
- 1999: Jimmy Tittle - Don't Follow Me Down (DixieFroh)
- 1999: Steve Earle And The Del McCoury Band - The Mountain (E-Squared / New West)
- 1999: Various Artists: Bluegrass Mandolin Extravaganza (Acoustic Disc) with Sam Bush, David Grisman, Jesse McReynolds, Bobby Osborne, Ricky Skaggs, Frank Wakefield, Buck White, and Del McCoury
- 2000: Ricky Skaggs & Friends - Big Mon (The Songs Of Bill Monroe) (Skaggs Family Records)
- 2002: The Chieftains - Down the Old Plank Road: The Nashville Sessions (RCA Victor)
- 2002: Nitty Gritty Dirt Band - Will the Circle Be Unbroken, Volume III (Capitol)
- 2002: Siobhan Maher Kennedy - Immigrant Flower (BMG / Gravity)
- 2002: Various Artists - Christmas On The Mountain: A Bluegrass Christmas (Universal South)
- 2003: David Grisman - Life of Sorrow (Acoustic Disc)
- 2004: Alecia Nugent - Alecia Nugent (Rounder)
- 2005: Charlie Daniels - Songs from the Longleaf Pines (Koch / Blue Hat)
- 2005: Dierks Bentley - Modern Day Drifter (Capitol Records Nashville)
- 2005: The Gibson Brothers - Red Letter Day (Sugar Hill)
- 2005: Ronnie Bowman - It's Gettin' Better All The Time (Koch)
- 2006: Vince Gill - These Days (MCA Nashville)
- 2007: Charlie Daniels - Deuces (Koch / Blue Hat)
- 2007: Ronnie Bowman - Cold Virginia Night (Rebel Records)
- 2009: Dierks Bentley - Feel That Fire (Capitol Nashville)
- 2009: Patty Loveless - Mountain Soul II (Saguaro Road)
- 2009: Michael Martin Murphey - Buckaroo Blue Grass (Rural Rhythm)
- 2009: Sara Watkins - Sara Watkins (Nonesuch)
- 2010: Dierks Bentley - Up on the Ridge (Capitol Records Nashville)
- 2010: Willie Nelson - Country Music (Rounder)
- 2011: Anna Ternheim - The Night Visitor (V2 Records)
- 2012: Preservation Hall Jazz Band - St. Peter & 57th St. (Rounder)
- 2013: Noam Pikelny - Noam Pikelny Plays Kenny Baker Plays Bill Monroe (Compass)
- 2013: Peter Rowan - The Old School (Compass)
- 2014: Leftover Salmon - The Nashville Sessions (LoS Records)
- 2014: Rodney Crowell - Tarpaper Sky (New West)
- 2015: The Gibson Brothers - Brotherhood (Rounder)
- 2016: Jeff White - Right Beside You (self-released)
- 2016: Loretta Lynn - Full Circle (Legacy Records)
- 2016: Frank Solivan - Family, Friends & Heroes (Compass)
- 2016: Jake Bugg - Hearts That Strain (Hearts That Strain)
