= Guy (Steve Earle & The Dukes album) =

Studio album by Steve Earle & The Dukes
- Released: March 29, 2019
- Studios: House of Blues (Nashville, Tennessee); Arlyn Studios (Austin, Texas)
- Length: 1:00:13
- Label: New West
- Producers: Steve Earle; The Twang Trust

Steve Earle & The Dukes chronology
So You Wannabe an Outlaw (2017)	Guy (2019)	Ghosts of West Virginia (2020)

Guy is the seventh studio album by American band Steve Earle & The Dukes. It was released on March 29, 2019, via New West Records. It was recorded at House of Blues in Nashville with additional recording took place at Arlyn Studios in Austin. Production was handled by Steve Earle, except for the song "The Last Gunfighter Ballad" off of 2011 This One's for Him: A Tribute to Guy Clark, which was produced by The Twang Trust.

== Critical reception ==
Professional ratings
Aggregate scores
Source	Rating
Metacritic	80/100
Review scores
Source	Rating
AllMusic	3.5/5 stars
American Songwriter	3.5/5 stars
Robert Christgau	(2-star Honorable Mention)
The Arts Desk	4/5 stars

Guy was met with generally favorable reviews from music critics. At Metacritic, which assigns a normalized rating out of 100 to reviews from mainstream publications, the album received an average score of 80, based on nine reviews.

== Track listing ==
No.	Title	Writer(s)	Length
1.	"Dublin Blues"	Guy Clark	3:48
2.	"L.A. Freeway"	G. Clark	4:06
3.	"Texas 1947"	G. Clark	3:14
4.	"Desperados Waiting for a Train"	G. Clark	4:34
5.	"Rita Ballou"	G. Clark	3:12
6.	"The Ballad of Laverne and Captain Flint"	G. Clark	4:05
7.	"The Randall Knife"	G. Clark	4:00
8.	"Anyhow I Love You"	G. Clark	3:06
9.	"That Old Time Feeling"	G. Clark	5:02
10.	"Heartbroke"	G. Clark	2:44
11.	"The Last Gunfighter Ballad"	G. Clark	3:21
12.	"Out in the Parking Lot"	G. Clark; James Scott	2:39
13.	"She Ain't Going Nowhere"	G. Clark	3:49
14.	"Sis Draper"	G. Clark; Shawn Camp	3:27
15.	"New Cut Road"	G. Clark	4:10
16.	"Old Friends"	G. Clark; Susanna Clark; Richard Dobson	4:56
Total length:			1:00:13

== Personnel ==
- Steve Earle – vocals, guitar, mandolin, producer
- Chris Masterson – vocals, guitar
- Eleanor Whitmore – vocals, fiddle, mandolin, tenor guitar
- Ricky Ray Jackson – vocals, pedal steel guitar
- Kelley Looney – bass
- Brad Pemberton – drums, percussion
- Shawn Camp – acoustic guitar (tracks: 14, 15), vocals & mandolin (track 16)
- Verlon Thompson – vocals & acoustic guitar (track 16)
- Gary Nicholson – vocals & acoustic guitar (track 16)
- Terry Allen – vocals (track 16), back cover art
- Jerry Jeff Walker – vocals (track 16)
- Emmylou Harris – vocals (track 16)
- Rodney Crowell – vocals (track 16)
- Jo Harvey Allen – vocals (track 16)
- Mickey Raphael – harmonica (track 16)
- Jim McGuire – dobro (track 16)
- The Twang Trust – producer (track 11)
- Ray Kennedy – recording, mixing, mastering
- Lance Allen – recording assistant
- Jacob Sciba – additional recording (track 16)
- Joseph Holguin – additional recording assistant (track 16)
- Tony Fitzpatrick – cover art
- Kim Buie – A&R

== Charts ==
Chart (2019)	Peak position
Belgian Albums (Ultratop Flanders)	162
Dutch Albums (Album Top 100)	94
German Albums (Offizielle Top 100)	99
Scottish Albums (Official Charts)	14
Swiss Albums (Schweizer Hitparade)	25
UK Albums (Official Charts)	49
UK Album Downloads (Official Charts)	81
UK Americana Albums (Official Charts)	1
UK Country Albums (Official Charts)	1
UK Independent Albums (Official Charts)	7
US Billboard 200	107
US Top Album Sales (Billboard)	10
US Top Country Albums (Billboard)	14
US Top Rock Albums (Billboard)	17
US Americana/Folk Albums (Billboard)	4
US Independent Albums (Billboard)	2
US Vinyl Albums (Billboard)	3
