= The Revolution Starts Now =

The Revolution Starts Now may refer to:

- The Revolution Starts Now (album), a 2004 album by Steve Earle
- "The Revolution Starts Now" (song), a song on the 2004 album by Steve Earle
- The Steve Earle Show, an American radio show formerly known as The Revolution Starts Now that last aired in 2007
