= The Mountain (Steve Earle album) =

Studio album by Steve Earle and Del McCoury Band
- Released: 23 February 1999
- Recorded: 1998
- Genre: Bluegrass
- Length: 45:45
- Label: E-Squared
- Producers: Steve Earle, Ray Kennedy, Ronnie McCoury

Steve Earle and Del McCoury Band chronology
El Corazón (1997)	The Mountain (1999)	Transcendental Blues (2000)

Professional ratings
Review scores
Source	Rating
AllMusic	4/5 stars
Entertainment Weekly	B+
Orlando Sentinel	4.5/5 stars
Pitchfork	8.8/10
The Rolling Stone Album Guide	4/5 stars
The Village Voice	A−

The Mountain is the eighth studio album by Steve Earle, backed by the Del McCoury Band, and released in 1999 (see 1999 in music).

The album was a significant departure from Earle's previous work, being the first wholly bluegrass album he had written. Earle made the album as a tribute to the founder of bluegrass music, Bill Monroe, who had died in 1996.

The album was nominated for a 2000 Grammy Award in the "Best Bluegrass Album" category (Earle's seventh Grammy nomination). Two tracks from the album were released as singles in the UK: "Dixieland" (distributed to radio only) and "The Mountain" (a commercial release).

Emmylou Harris performed the song "Pilgrim" on The Late Show with Stephen Colbert on July 10, 2017.

A cover of the song The Graveyard Shift is featured on Wanda Jackson's 2012 album Unfinished Business.

== Track listing ==
All tracks composed by Steve Earle

1. "Texas Eagle"
2. "Yours Forever Blue"
3. "Carrie Brown"
4. "I'm Still in Love with You" (Duet with Iris DeMent)
5. "The Graveyard Shift"
6. "Harlan Man"
7. "The Mountain"
8. "Outlaw's Honeymoon"
9. "Connemara Breakdown"
10. "Leroy's Dustbowl Blues"
11. "Dixieland"
12. "Paddy on the Beat"
13. "Long, Lonesome Highway Blues"
14. "Pilgrim"

== Personnel ==
- Steve Earle — guitar, vocal
- Del McCoury — guitar, vocal
- Ronnie McCoury — mandolin, vocal
- Rob McCoury — banjo
- Jason Carter — fiddle
- Mike Bub — bass

Additional artists

- Iris Dement - vocal (track 4)
- Sam Bush - mandolin (track 14)
- Jerry Douglas - resonator guitar (track 4, 14)
- Stuart Duncan - fiddle (tracks 4, 9, 12)
- Dan Gillis - tin whistle (track 11)
- Gene Wooten - resonator guitar (tracks 7, 10)
- Tony Fitzpatrick - Album Artwork

Chorus on track 14

- Meghann Ahern
- Sam Bush
- Kathy Chiavola
- Cowboy Jack Clement
- Dave Ferguson
- Emmylou Harris
- John Hartford
- J.T. Huskey
- Lisa Huskey
- Benny Martin
- Tim O'Brien
- David Rawlings
- Peter Rowan
- Marty Stuart
- Gillian Welch

== Chart performance ==
Chart (1999)	Peak position
Australian Albums (ARIA Charts)	93
U.S. Billboard Top Country Albums	19
U.S. Billboard 200	133
Canadian RPM Country Albums	14
