= El Corazón (Steve Earle album) =

Studio album by Steve Earle
- Released: October 7, 1997
- Genre: Alternative country
- Length: 45:07
- Label: Warner Music
- Producers: The Twangtrust (Steve Earle and Ray Kennedy)

Steve Earle chronology
I Feel Alright (1996)	El Corazón (1997)	The Mountain (1999)

El Corazón (English: The Heart) is the seventh studio album by American singer-songwriter Steve Earle, released in 1997.

== Reception ==
Professional ratings
Review scores
Source	Rating
AllMusic	4/5 stars
Chicago Tribune	3.5/4 stars
Entertainment Weekly	A−
The Guardian	4/5 stars
Los Angeles Times	3.5/4 stars
Pitchfork	8.7/10
The Province	4/5
Rolling Stone	5/5 stars
Spin	6/10
The Village Voice	A−

The music writers of The Associated Press voted it one of the ten best pop albums of the 1990s.

== Track listing ==
All songs written by Steve Earle.

1. "Christmas in Washington" – 4:58
2. "Taneytown" – 5:13
  - With Emmylou Harris on background vocals.
3. "If You Fall" – 4:10
4. "I Still Carry You Around" – 2:45
  - With the Del McCoury Band.
5. "Telephone Road" – 3:42
  - With The Fairfield Four on background vocals.
6. "Somewhere Out There" – 3:46
7. "You Know the Rest" – 2:12
8. "N.Y.C." – 3:37
  - With the Supersuckers.
9. "Poison Lovers" – 3:47
  - Duet with Siobhan Kennedy.
10. "The Other Side of Town" – 4:17
11. "Here I Am" – 2:38
12. "Fort Worth Blues" – 4:02

== Personnel ==
- Steve Earle - guitar, vocals, mandola, harmonium, harmonica
- Del McCoury - guitar, vocals
- Emmylou Harris - vocals
- Ray Kennedy - drums, harmonium
- Dan Bolton - guitar
- Mike Bub - bass
- Tommy Hannum - steel guitar
- Roy Huskey, Jr. - bass
- Kelly Looney - bass
- Robbie McCoury - banjo
- Ronnie McCoury - mandolin, vocals
- Micheal Smotherman - organ
- Dan "Dancing Eagle" Seigal - drums
- Eddie Spaghetti - bass
- Ross Rice - drums, vocals
- David Steele - guitar
- Brad Jones - bass
- Renaldo Allegre - guitar
- Brady Blade - drums, percussion, washboard
- Jason Carter - fiddle
- Mark Stuart - acoustic guitar, mandolin
- Justin Earle - electric guitar
- Jim Hoke - baritone saxophone
- Tony Fitzpatrick - album artwork
