= Jerusalem (Steve Earle album) =

Studio album by Steve Earle
- Released: September 24, 2002
- Genre: Rock
- Length: 36:24
- Label: E-Squared Records
- Producers: Twangtrust (Steve Earle and Ray Kennedy)

Steve Earle chronology
Transcendental Blues (2000)	Jerusalem (2002)	The Revolution Starts Now (2004)

Professional ratings
Aggregate scores
Source	Rating
Metacritic	78/100 link
Review scores
Source	Rating
AllMusic	3/5 stars
The New Rolling Stone Album Guide	4/5 stars
Pitchfork	5.6/10

Jerusalem is the 10th studio album by American singer-songwriter Steve Earle, released in 2002. A concept album, it has a political theme, and contains songs about a post–September 11, 2001 world.

== Track listing ==
All tracks composed by Steve Earle; except where indicated

1. "Ashes to Ashes" – 4:02
2. "Amerika V. 6.0 (The Best We Can Do)" – 4:19
3. "Conspiracy Theory" – 4:14 (Duet with Siobhan Kennedy)
4. "John Walker's Blues" – 3:41
5. "The Kind" – 2:04
6. "What's A Simple Man To Do?" – 2:29
7. "The Truth" – 2:21
8. "Go Amanda" – 3:34 (Earle, Sheryl Crow)
9. "I Remember You" – 2:53 (Duet with Emmylou Harris)
10. "Shadowland" – 2:52
11. "Jerusalem'" – 3:56

== Personnel ==
- Steve Earle - vocals, guitar, bass, organ, banjo, mandolin, harmonium, harmonica
- Emmylou Harris - vocals
- Siobhan Kennedy - vocals
- Eric Ambel - guitar, vocals
- Dane Clark - drum loop
- Ken Coomer - drums
- John Barlow Jarvis - electric piano
- Kelly Looney - bass
- Kenny Malone - drums, percussion
- Will Rigby - drums, percussion
- Patrick Earle - percussion
- Tony Fitzpatrick - album Artwork

== Chart performance ==
Chart (2002)	Peak position
U.S. Billboard Top Country Albums	7
U.S. Billboard 200	59
U.S. Billboard Independent Albums	1

=== Year-end charts ===
Chart (2002)	Position
Canadian Country Albums (Nielsen SoundScan)	72
