= The V-Roys =

Background information
- Origin: Knoxville, Tennessee, Tennessee, United States
- Genres: Alternative Country
- Years active: 1994–2000, 2011
- Labels: E-Squared Records
- Members: Scott Miller; Mic Harrison; Paxton Sellers; Jeff Bills
- Past members: John Paul Keith

The V-Roys were a Knoxville, Tennessee-based alternative country band signed to E-Squared Records. The band was described as "walking the fine line between rootsy country and cutting-edge alternative rock". Scott Miller, John Paul Keith, and Mic Harrison were the primary songwriters for the band.

== History ==
The band was formed in Knoxville in 1994, with guitarist/vocalist Scott Miller, lead guitarist John Paul Keith, bassist Paxton Sellers, and drummer Jeff Bills. They were originally named The Viceroys, but were forced to change it after being threatened with a lawsuit from a Jamaican band.

Before their first album was recorded, Keith left the band and was replaced by Mic Harrison.

== Releases ==
The V-Roys first album, Just Add Ice was the first release on Steve Earle's E-Squared Records. The title is a playful reference to their decision to remove the letters "ice" from "The Viceroys" as a result of the threatened lawsuit. The album is described as a "solid reflection of their live show" and "jangling, melancholy country–rock". The band recorded it "live without a lot of bells and whistles, to get something out as quick as we could and go out and support it".

1998's All About Town is a "more subtle, but endlessly melodic" album that saw the band "stretch out and add elements of bluegrass and broader production values". Miller commented that Earle "pushed us a lot harder and put his foot way up our asses this time", and "handed songs back to us if they weren't good enough". Allmusic describes the album as "twelve concise songs that swing from the Creedence-ish "Window Song" to the country-folk of "Mary" to the sounds of Appalachia in "Virginia Way" to the great highway tune of "Strange".

Both of the band's studio albums were produced by Steve Earle and Ray Kennedy, known as the "Twangtrust". The band also had 3 tracks on the soundtrack to the film You Can Count on Me.

After road-weariness, Earle losing interest, and reaching their creative peak, the band decided to break up. They released a live album, Are You Through Yet?, recorded at a concert at the Down Home in Johnson City, Tennessee. The album is complimented as "a marvelous send-off, but it also provides a fine introduction to the group for those who missed them the first time around".

The band played what was then called their final show at the historic Tennessee Theatre on New Year's Eve, 1999.

== Reunion ==
In July 2011, it was announced that the band then would be releasing a compilation album on Miller's record label. The album, Sooner or Later features songs from their two studio albums, and previously unreleased tracks. They also played a concert on New Year's Eve 2011 in Knoxville. The show was called "One Show; Goodbye".

== Reception ==
The band was described as "a critically acclaimed, commercially under appreciated" band with a "tasty brand of roots rock".

Their live show was often complimented. It was illustrated as shows that "swung from honky-tonk pathos to punk-ish ferocity, and by the end of a show it was sometimes hard to tell one from the other". The band was particularly popular locally; shows were described as "genuine events, with advance tickets, sold-out clubs". Just Add Ice was said to be the best selling album in ten years at a Knoxville record store.

The V-Roys were named the best Knoxville band ever in a 2009 poll conducted by Knoxville's weekly newspaper Metro Pulse. The voters were members of the Knoxville music industry.

== Discography ==
Year	Title	Label
1996	Just Add Ice	E-Squared Records
1997	Johnny Too Bad EP (With Steve Earle and the Fairfield Four)	E-Squared Records
1998	All About Town	E-Squared Records
2000	Are You Through Yet	E-Squared Records
2011	Sooner or Later (Compilation)	F.A.Y. Recordings
