= Transcendental Blues =

Studio album by Steve Earle
- Released: June 6, 2000
- Recorded: 2000
- Genres: Country rock; bluegrass; pop; garage rock; roots rock
- Length: 49:48
- Label: E-Squared
- Producers: Steve Earle, Ray Kennedy

Steve Earle chronology
The Mountain (1999)	Transcendental Blues (2000)	Jerusalem (2002)

Professional ratings
Aggregate scores
Source	Rating
Metacritic	86/100
Review scores
Source	Rating
AllMusic	4/5 stars
The Encyclopedia of Popular Music	3/5 stars
Entertainment Weekly	A−
The Independent	4/5 stars
Mojo	4/5 stars
The New Rolling Stone Album Guide	3.5/5 stars
Pitchfork	8.1/10
PopMatters	8/10
Q	4/5 stars
Rolling Stone	3.5/5 stars

Transcendental Blues is the ninth studio album by Steve Earle, released in 2000. It features Sharon Shannon on the track "The Galway Girl". The album was nominated for a Grammy in the Best Contemporary Folk Album category.

It sold 20,000 copies during its first week of release.

== Track listing ==
All tracks written by Steve Earle

1. "Transcendental Blues" – 4:13
  - Steve Earle – guitars, harmonium, mini-Moog, vocals
  - Dan Metz – bass
  - Ron Vance – drums
2. "Everyone's in Love with You" – 3:30
  - Steve Earle – electric guitar, vocals
  - David Steele – electric guitar
  - Kelley Looney – bass
  - Will Rigby – drums, percussion
  - Tom Littlefield – vocals
3. "Another Town" – 2:22
  - Steve Earle – acoustic guitar, vocals
  - David Steele – electric guitars
  - Kelley Looney – bass
  - Will Rigby – drums, percussion
4. "I Can Wait" – 3:16
  - Steve Earle – 12-string acoustic, vocals
  - David Steele – electric guitar
  - Kelley Looney – bass
  - Will Rigby – drums, percussion
  - Tom Littlefield – vocals
5. "The Boy Who Never Cried" – 3:46
  - Steve Earle – 12-string Guitar, harmonium, vocals
  - David Steele – bouzouki
  - Kelley Looney – bass
  - Will Rigby – drums, percussion
  - Strings arranged and conducted by Kristin Wilkinson and performed by The Love Sponge:
    - Kristin Wilkinson – viola
    - John Catchings – cello
    - David Angell – violin
    - David Davidson – violin
6. "Steve's Last Ramble" – 3:38
  - Steve Earle – acoustic guitar, harmonica, vocals
  - Sharon Shannon – accordion
  - Mary Shannon – banjo
  - Liz Kane – fiddle
  - Yvonne Kane – fiddle
  - Jim Murray – gut string guitar
  - Bill Wright – bouzouki
  - David Steele – electric guitar
  - James Blennerhassett – upright bass
  - Noel Bridgeman – drums
7. "The Galway Girl" – 3:05
  - Steve Earle – mandolin, vocals
  - Sharon Shannon – accordion
  - Mary Shannon – banjo
  - Liz Kane – fiddle
  - Yvonne Kane – fiddle
  - Jim Murray – guitar
  - Bill Wright – bouzouki
  - Dan Gillis – tin whistle
  - James Blennerhassett – upright bass
  - Joyce Redmond – bodhran
  - Noel Bridgeman – drums
8. "Lonelier Than This" – 3:11
  - Steve Earle – acoustic guitar, vocals
  - David Steele – resonator guitar
  - Kelley Looney – bass
  - Ray Kennedy – electric guitar
  - Will Rigby – drums, percussion
9. "Wherever I Go" – 1:57
  - Steve Earle – electric guitar, acoustic guitar, vocals
  - David Steele – electric 12-string guitar
  - Benmont Tench – organ, piano
  - Kelley Looney – bass
  - Will Rigby – drums
10. "When I Fall" – 4:34
  - Steve Earle – acoustic guitar, harmonica, vocals
  - Stacey Earle – vocals
  - Doug Lancio – electric guitars
  - Ray Kennedy – bass
  - Patrick Earle – drums, percussion
11. "I Don't Want to Lose You Yet" – 3:22
  - Steve Earle – acoustic guitar, vocals
  - David Steele – electric guitars
  - Benmont Tench – organ
  - Kelley Looney – bass
  - Will Rigby – drums, percussion
  - Tom Littlefield – vocals
12. "Halo 'Round the Moon" – 2:13
  - Steve Earle – resonator guitar, harmonium, vocals
  - David Steele – resonator guitar
  - Kelley Looney – bass
  - Will Rigby – drums, percussion
13. "Until the Day I Die" – 3:22
  - Steve Earle – guitar, vocals
  - Tim O'Brien – mandolin, vocals
  - Darrell Scott – banjo, vocals
  - Casey Driessen – fiddle
  - Dennis Crouch – upright bass
14. "All My Life" – 3:27
  - Steve Earle – guitars, harmonium, vocals
  - Ray Kennedy – bass
  - Patrick Earle – drums, percussion
15. "Over Yonder (Jonathan's Song)" – 3:51
  - Steve Earle – acoustic guitar, harmonica, vocals
  - David Steele – mandola
  - Kelley Looney – bass
  - Will Rigby – drums, percussion

== Personnel ==
- David Angell - violin
- James Blennerhassett - double bass
- Noel Bridgeman - drums
- David Davidson - violin
- John Catchings - cello
- Dennis Crouch - double bass
- Casey Driessen - fiddle
- Patrick Earle - drums, percussion
- Stacey Earle - vocals
- Dan Gillis - tin whistle
- Liz Kane - fiddle
- Yvonne Kane - fiddle
- Ray Kennedy - electric guitar, bass
- Doug Lancio - electric guitar
- Kelley Looney - bass
- Dan Metz - bass
- Jim Murray - gut string guitar
- Tim O'Brien - vocals, mandolin
- Joyce Redmond - bodhrán
- Will Rigby - drums, percussion
- Darrell Scott - vocals, banjo
- Mary Shannon - banjo
- Sharon Shannon - accordion
- David Steele - electric guitar, bouzouki
- Benmont Tench - piano, organ
- Ron Vance - drums
- Kristin Wilkinson - viola
- Bill Wright - bouzouki
- Steve Earle - vocals, guitar, harmonium, harmonica, synthesizer, mandolin
- Tony Fitzpatrick - album artwork

== Chart performance ==
Chart (2000)	Peak position
U.S. Billboard Top Country Albums	5
U.S. Billboard 200	66
Canadian RPM Country Albums	8
Canadian RPM Top Albums	28
