= The Low Highway =

Studio album by Steve Earle
- Released: April 16, 2013
- Genre: Country
- Label: New West
- Producers: Steve Earle, Ray Kennedy

Steve Earle chronology
I'll Never Get Out of This World Alive (2011)	The Low Highway (2013)	Terraplane (2015)

The Low Highway is the 15th studio album by singer-songwriter Steve Earle, released in 2013. The album features two songs co-written by Earle and Lucia Micarelli: "Love's Gonna Blow My Way", "After Mardi Gras". Two songs from the album, "After Mardi Gras" and "That All You Got?", are featured in the HBO TV Series Treme.

The album debuted at No. 12 on Top Country Albums, and No. 39 on Billboard 200, selling 11,000 copies in the first week. It has sold 42,000 copies in the US as of February 2015.

== Reception ==
Professional ratings
Aggregate scores
Source	Rating
Metacritic	78/100
Review scores
Source	Rating
AllMusic	4/5 stars
American Songwriter	4/5 stars
The Guardian	4/5 stars
Rolling Stone	3.5/5 stars
The Telegraph	3.5/5 stars

The album garnered generally positive critical response. Neil Spencer of The Guardian wrote, Earle's "playing is immaculate and the songcraft admirable".

The song, "Invisible", was nominated for Best American Roots Song at the 56th Grammy Awards.

== Track listing ==
All songs written by Steve Earle unless otherwise noted.

1. "The Low Highway" – 3:59
2. "Calico County" – 2:59
3. "Burnin' It Down" – 2:57
4. "That All You Got?" – 3:00
5. "Love's Gonna Blow My Way" (Earle, Lucia Micarelli) – 2:49
6. "After Mardi Gras" (Earle, Lucia Micarelli) – 4:04
7. "Pocket Full of Rain" – 3:15
8. "Invisible" – 4:19
9. "Warren Hellman's Banjo" – 1:47
10. "Down the Road Pt. II" – 2:36
11. "21st Century Blues" – 3:40
12. "Remember Me" – 4:35

== Personnel ==
=== Musicians ===
- Steve Earle – guitar, mandolin, banjo, piano and vocal
- Allison Moorer – piano, organ, accordion, harmonium and vocal
- Chris Masterson – guitar, pedal steel guitar
- Eleanor Whitmore – fiddle, baritone fiddle, mandolin and the thing
- Kelley Looney – upright bass and electric bass
- Will Rigby – drums, percussion
- Siobhan Kennedy

=== Production ===
- Produced by Steve Earle and Ray Kennedy
- Recorded, mixed and mastered by Ray Kennedy at Ben's Studio and Room and Board – Nashville, Tennessee
- Additional mastering for vinyl by George Ingram at NRP – Nashville, Tennessee
- Assistant engineer – Leslie Richter

=== Artwork ===
- Cover artwork by Tony Fitzpatrick
- Design by Paul Moore
- Photos by Ted Barron

== Chart performance ==
Chart (2013)	Peak position
Belgian Albums (Ultratop Flanders)	71
Dutch Albums (Album Top 100)	31
Norwegian Albums (VG-lista)	17
Scottish Albums (Official Charts)	18
Swedish Albums (Sverigetopplistan)	16
UK Albums (Official Charts)	30
UK Independent Albums (Official Charts)	3
US Billboard 200	39
US Top Country Albums (Billboard)	12
US Americana/Folk Albums (Billboard)	4
US Independent Albums (Billboard)	10
