= I Feel Alright =

Studio album by Steve Earle
- Released: March 5, 1996
- Genres: Rock; country
- Length: 38:57
- Label: E-Squared Records
- Producers: Ray Kennedy and Richard Bennett (tracks: 1, 5, 8 to 12), Richard Dodd (tracks: 2 to 4, 6 and 7)

Steve Earle chronology
Train a Comin' (1995)	I Feel Alright (1996)	El Corazón (1997)

I Feel Alright is the sixth studio album by Steve Earle, released in 1996.

The title track was featured in the closing scenes of the season 2 finale of The Wire and in the 2006 film Talladega Nights. "Hard-Core Troubadour" was also featured in Talladega Nights.

== Critical reception ==
Professional ratings
Review scores
Source	Rating
AllMusic	4.5/5 stars
Christgau's Consumer Guide	(3-star Honorable Mention)
Entertainment Weekly	A
Los Angeles Times	3/4 stars
The New Rolling Stone Album Guide	4/5 stars
Rolling Stone	4/5 stars
Spin	9/10

Writing for Entertainment Weekly, Alanna Nash gave I Feel Alright an "A" grade. She wrote, "If I Feel Alright doesn’t deliver the grit that has been Earle’s gift to rock and country, his roots-rock joie de vivre sends no apologies, only a healthy message for the ’90s: Don’t feel bad about feeling good."

=== Accolades ===
Organization/Publication	Year	Accolade	Position	Reference
Eye Weekly (Canada)	1996	"Albums of the year"	8	
Guitar Player (USA)	1997	"Best Country Guitar album"	3	
Nashville Music Awards (USA)	1997	best rock album	*	
Spin (USA)	1999	"Top 90 Albums of the 90s"	75	

== Track listing ==
All tracks are written by Steve Earle.

No.	Title	Length
1.	"Feel Alright"	3:04
2.	"Hard-Core Troubadour"	2:41
3.	"More Than I Can Do"	2:37
4.	"Hurtin' Me, Hurtin' You"	3:21
5.	"Now She's Gone"	2:48
6.	"Poor Boy"	2:55
7.	"Valentine's Day"	2:59
8.	"The Unrepentant"	4:31
9.	"CCKMP"	4:30
10.	"Billy and Bonnie"	3:39
11.	"South Nashville Blues"	2:28
12.	"You're Still Standin' There"	3:24
Total length:		38:57

== Personnel ==
=== Musicians ===
- Steve Earle – guitars, harmonica, vocals
- Richard Bennett, Ray Kennedy – guitar
- Kelly Looney, Garry Tallent, Roy Huskey, Jr., Ric Kipp – bass
- Kurt Custer, Greg Morrow – drums
- Ken Moore – organ
- Richard Bennett – harmonium
- Lucinda Williams – vocals on "You're Still Standin' There"
- Kurt Custer, Richard Bennett, Greg Morrow, Dub Cornett – percussion
- Custer & Logan, The Fairfield Four (musical director: Mark Prentice), Lucinda Williams, Ms. Williams' stunt double Siobhan Maher – vocals
- Kris Wilkerson – string arrangement and conductor
- Carl Gordetzky, Pamela Sixfin, Richard Grosjean – violin
- Lee Larrison – viola
- Robert Mason – cello

=== Cover art ===
- Tony Fitzpatrick – album artwork

=== Production ===
Ray Kennedy and Richard Bennett (tracks: 1, 5, 8–12), Richard Dodd (tracks: 2–4, 6 and 7)

== Releases ==
year	format	label	catalog #
1996	CD	Warner Bros. Records	46201
1996	cassette	Warner Bros. Records	46201
1996	CD	Transatlantic	227

== Charts ==
year	chart	peak
1996	The Billboard 200	106
