= I'll Never Get Out of This World Alive (album) =

Studio album by Steve Earle
- Released: April 26, 2011
- Recorded: May, November 2010
- Genres: Country; rockabilly; blues
- Length: 37:42
- Label: New West
- Producer: T Bone Burnett

Steve Earle chronology
Townes (2009)	I'll Never Get Out of This World Alive (2011)	The Low Highway (2013)

Professional ratings
Aggregate scores
Source	Rating
Metacritic	74/100
Review scores
Source	Rating
AllMusic	4/5 stars
BBC	Mixed
Telegraph	4/5 stars

I'll Never Get Out of This World Alive is the 14th studio album by American singer-songwriter Steve Earle, released in 2011, produced by T Bone Burnett. All of the songs are written by Earle, with the exception of the title track, which is included as a download-only bonus track.

Four of the songs were originally written for other projects. "This City", was originally written for the David Simon show Treme and appears on its soundtrack. It was nominated for a Grammy in 2011 for "Best Song Written For Motion Picture, Television Or Other Visual Media". "Lonely are the Free" was written and recorded for the 2010 Tim Blake Nelson film Leaves of Grass, in which Earle had a small part. This earlier version was played over the closing credits and appeared on the film soundtrack. Earle originally wrote the tracks "God Is God" and "I am a Wanderer" for Joan Baez's Day After Tomorrow album.

Earle has said that the title for the album was inspired by the Hank Williams song of the same name which is available as a bonus track from iTunes. Earle also wrote a novel with the same title.

== Track listing ==
All tracks are written by Steve Earle, except Track 12 on the iTunes version.

No.	Title	Length
1.	"Waitin' on the Sky"	3:28
2.	"Little Emperor"	2:58
3.	"The Gulf of Mexico"	4:15
4.	"Molly-O"	3:20
5.	"God Is God"	3:59
6.	"Meet Me in the Alleyway"	4:25
7.	"Every Part of Me"	2:51
8.	"Lonely Are the Free"	3:23
9.	"Heaven or Hell"	3:26
10.	"I Am a Wanderer"	2:53
11.	"This City"	2:44

=== iTunes exclusive ===
All tracks are written by Steve Earle, except Track 12.

No.	Title	Writer(s)	Length
12.	"I'll Never Get Out of This World Alive"	Fred Rose, Hank Williams	2:37
13.	"The Making of I'll Never Get Out of This World Alive, Pt. 1"		9:21
14.	"The Making of I'll Never Get Out of This World Alive, Pt. 2"		9:21

== Chart performance ==
Chart (2011)	Peak position
U.S. Billboard 200	24
U.S. Billboard Top Country Albums	4
U.S. Billboard Top Independent Albums	4
U.S. Billboard Top Rock Albums	7
Canadian Albums Chart	17

== Personnel ==
- Steve Earle - vocals, acoustic guitar, banjo, bouzouki, mandolin, harmonica
- Sara Watkins - vocals, fiddle
- T Bone Burnett - vocals, electric guitar
- Jay Bellerose - drums
- Dennis Crouch - bass
- A. Michael Brown - euphonium
- Roland Guerin - acoustic bass
- Keefus Ciancia - Mellotron
- Jackson Smith - electric guitar
- Sammie Williams - trombone
- Tim Robbins
- Jonathan Gross - tuba
- Tracey Griffin - flugelhorn
- Allison Moorer - backing vocals
