= Townes (album) =

Studio album by Steve Earle
- Released: May 12, 2009
- Genre: Folk
- Length: 54:05
- Label: New West
- Producer: Steve Earle

Steve Earle chronology
Washington Square Serenade (2007)	Townes (2009)	I'll Never Get Out of This World Alive (2011)

Professional ratings
Aggregate scores
Source	Rating
Metacritic	82/100
Review scores
Source	Rating
AllMusic	4/5 stars
The Austin Chronicle	4/5 stars
The A.V. Club	B+
Entertainment Weekly	A
Mojo	4/5 stars
PopMatters	9/10
Q	4/5 stars
Rolling Stone	3.5/5 stars
Spin	4/5 stars
Uncut	4/5 stars

Townes is the 13th studio album by American singer-songwriter Steve Earle, released in 2009. It is an album on which he pays tribute to his friend and mentor, the late singer-songwriter Townes Van Zandt by covering his songs. According to a New West Records press release, "The songs selected for Townes were the ones that meant the most to Earle and the ones he personally connected to (not including selections featured on previous Earle albums). Some of the selections chosen were songs that Earle has played his entire career ("Pancho & Lefty", "Lungs" and "White Freightliner Blues") and others he had to learn specifically for recording.

Notable guest appearances on the album include Tom Morello (of Rage Against the Machine/Audioslave/Street Sweeper Social Club) playing electric guitar on "Lungs", and Earle's wife Allison Moorer singing backing vocals on "Loretta" and "To Live Is to Fly". Earle and his son, Justin Townes Earle trade verses on "Mr. Mudd & Mr. Gold". He is backed by The Bluegrass Dukes on "White Freightliner Blues" and "Delta Momma Blues".

This album won Best Contemporary Folk Album at the 52nd Grammy Awards.

A two disc CD version included a subset of the songs performed solo by Earle. This bonus set was also released on vinyl for Record Store Day.

== Track listing ==
=== Disc One: Townes ===
All tracks are written by Townes Van Zandt (except where noted).

No.	Title	Writer(s)	Length
1.	"Pancho & Lefty"		4:02
2.	"White Freightliner Blues"		3:28
3.	"Colorado Girl"		3:35
4.	"Where I Lead Me"		3:30
5.	"Lungs"		2:19
6.	"No Place To Fall"		2:53
7.	"Loretta"		3:14
8.	"Brand New Companion"		5:12
9.	"Rake"		3:23
10.	"Delta Momma Blues"	Van Zandt, Matthew Moore, Caddo Parish Studdard	5:14
11.	"Marie"		4:53
12.	"Don't Take It Too Bad"		3:12
13.	"Mr. Mudd & Mr. Gold"		2:18
14.	"(Quicksilver Daydreams of) Maria"		3:20
15.	"To Live Is To Fly"		3:40

=== Disc Two: The Basics ===
(included in 2-CD version)

All tracks are written by Townes Van Zandt.

No.	Title	Length
1.	"Pancho And Lefty"	4:02
2.	"Where I Lead Me"	3:37
3.	"Lungs"	2:22
4.	"No Place To Fall"	2:56
5.	"Loretta"	3:14
6.	"Brand New Companion"	5:12
7.	"Rake"	3:22
8.	"Marie"	4:49
9.	"Mr. Mudd And Mr. Gold"	2:34
10.	"(Quicksilver Daydreams Of) Maria"	3:15
11.	"To Live Is To Fly"	3:36

== Personnel ==
- Steve Christensen - percussion, audio engineer
- Shad Cobb - fiddle
- Dennis Crouch - bass
- Justin Townes Earle - guitar, vocals
- Allison Moorer - vocals
- Tom Morello - electric guitar
- Greg Morrow - drums
- Tim O'Brien - mandolin
- Darrell Scott - banjo, resonator guitar
- John Spiker - electric bass
- Steve Earle - vocals, guitar, mandola, harmonica, harmonium

== Charts ==
Chart performance
Chart (2009)	Peak position
Canadian Albums (Nielsen SoundScan)	28
Dutch Albums (Album Top 100)	80
Irish Albums (IRMA)	42
New Zealand Albums (RMNZ)	34
Norwegian Albums (VG-lista)	28
Scottish Albums (Official Charts)	16
Swedish Albums (Sverigetopplistan)	24
UK Albums (Official Charts)	37
UK Country Albums (Official Charts)	2
US Billboard 200	19
US Independent Albums (Billboard)	2
US Indie Store Album Sales (Billboard)	2
US Top Country Albums (Billboard)	6
