= The Hard Way (Steve Earle album) =

Studio album by Steve Earle
- Released: July 1, 1990
- Studios: Sound Emporium (Nashville, Tennessee); Ardent (Memphis, Tennessee)
- Genres: Country rock; rock and roll
- Length: 55:47
- Label: MCA
- Producers: Steve Earle, Joe Hardy

Steve Earle chronology
Copperhead Road (1988)	The Hard Way (1990)	Train a Comin' (1995)

Professional ratings
Review scores
Source	Rating
AllMusic	3/5 stars
Austin American-Statesman	2.5/4 stars
Calgary Herald	B+
The Encyclopedia of Popular Music	3/5 stars
Entertainment Weekly	A
MusicHound Rock: The Essential Album Guide	3.5/5 stars
Ottawa Citizen	4/5 stars
The Rolling Stone Album Guide	3/5 stars
Select	5/5 stars

The Hard Way is the fourth studio album by Steve Earle, released in 1990. Earle is backed by the Dukes. The album is dedicated to Emilio Lorenzo Ensenat (1930–90).

The album peaked at No. 100 on the Billboard 200. It peaked at No. 22 on the UK Albums Chart.

== Production ==
The album was produced by Joe Hardy and Earle. It was recorded at Sound Emporium Studios, in Nashville, and at Ardent Studios, in Memphis.

== Critical reception ==
The Los Angeles Times noted the Springsteen influence, writing that the album contains "no fewer than two racing-in-the-streets songs and no fewer than two Death Row laments." Lone Star Music Magazine wrote that "although it’s admittedly over-long at just under an hour and burdened with even more of a hair-metal production aesthetic than Copperhead Road, it’s loaded with genuinely great songs." The Dallas Observer called "Billy Austin" "storytelling at its stark, bleakest best."

== Track listing ==
All tracks are written by Steve Earle unless otherwise noted.

No.	Title	Writer(s)	Length
1.	"The Other Kind"		5:09
2.	"Promise You Anything"	Earle, Maria McKee, Patrick Sugg	2:43
3.	"Esmeralda's Hollywood"	Earle, Maria McKee	6:01
4.	"Hopeless Romantics"		2:45
5.	"This Highway's Mine (Roadmaster)"		3:54
6.	"Billy Austin"		6:16
7.	"Justice in Ontario"		4:47
8.	"Have Mercy"		4:41
9.	"When the People Find Out"		4:10
10.	"Country Girl"		4:11
11.	"Regular Guy"		3:17
12.	"West Nashville Boogie"		3:09
13.	"Close Your Eyes"		4:44

== Personnel ==
- Steve Earle – lead vocal, acoustic guitar, electric guitars, mandolin, Mandoblaster, 6-string bass, guitar synthesizer on "Billy Austin", percussion programme on "This Highway's Mine", harmonies on "Justice In Ontario" and "Hopeless Romantics"

=== The Dukes ===
- Bucky Baxter – Mullins pedal steel guitar
- Ken Moore – organ, synthesizer, string arrangements on "Esmeralda's Hollywood"
- Dwayne "Zip" Gibson – electric guitars, vocals
- Kelly Looney – bass, vocals
- Craig Wright – drums

with:

- John Jarvis – piano
- Lester Snell – organ on "When the People Find Out" and director of chorus
- Patrick Earle – percussion
- Stacey Earle Mims – harmony on "Promise You Anything"
- The Christ Missionary Baptist Church Choir – chorus on "When the People Find Out"
- Amy Dotson, Billy Baker, Billy Steele, Chip Phillips, Chuck Allen, Craig Wright, Denis Colby, Doug Baker, Ian Earle, Justin Townes Earle, Katryna Haddrick, Kelly Looney, Ken Moore, Patrick Earle, Peter Keppler, Robyn Gibson, Scot Bonner, Stacey Earle Mims, Tommy McRae, Zip Gibson – backing vocals on "Regular Guy", directed by Skott Nelson
- Patricia Snell, Susan Jerome, William C. Brown III – backing vocals on "Close Your Eyes"
