= Jerry Jeff =

Studio album by Steve Earle & the Dukes
- Released: May 27, 2022
- Studios: Electric Lady Studios (New York, NY)
- Length: 36:56
- Label: New West
- Producer: Steve Earle

Steve Earle & the Dukes chronology
J.T. (2021)	Jerry Jeff (2022)	Alone Again (Live) (2024)

Jerry Jeff is a studio album by American rock band Steve Earle & The Dukes. It was released on May 27, 2022, via New West Records. Recording sessions took place at Electric Lady Studios in New York City. Production was handled by Steve Earle himself. The album covers ten songs written by American country and folk singer-songwriter Jerry Jeff Walker, who died from throat cancer on October 23, 2020, at a hospital in Austin, Texas at the age of 78, paying tribute to the late musician.

== Critical reception ==
Professional ratings
Aggregate scores
Source	Rating
Metacritic	81/100
Review scores
Source	Rating
AllMusic	3.5/5 stars
American Songwriter	4/5 stars
Classic Rock	3/5 stars
Mojo	4/5 stars
Record Collector	4/5 stars
Spectrum Culture	79/100%
Uncut	4/5 stars

Jerry Jeff was met with universal acclaim from music critics. At Metacritic, which assigns a normalised rating out of 100 to reviews from mainstream publications, the album received an average score of 81, based on four reviews.

Lee Zimmerman of American Songwriter found that the album "serves the purpose well by turning the spotlight on an artist that deserves greater attention within the Americana arena. Earle's effort to share his songs will hopefully contribute to that added appreciation". Sylvie Simmons of Mojo praised the album, saying "it just sounds so good. Warm and natural. And Earle's voice has rarely sounded better". Nick Hasted of Uncut wrote: "'Mr Bojangles', sung with cornpone syrup by Dylan, here earthily returns to the drunk-tank cell where Walker met its subject, a broken-down, alcoholic tap-dancer his song invests with heel-clicking magic. The tune defiantly climbs, strings waltz and Earle stores sentiment 'til the end". In his mixed review for Classic Rock, Stuart Bailie stated: "he delves into lesser-known parts, like "Wheel", a 1973 song about tragic, rural cycles, and he sings "Old Road", as a sparse holler, akin to the original. Other songs celebrate the 'gonzo country' aims of Jerry Jeff, but "Mr Bojangles" and his worn-out shoes is still best in show".

== Track listing ==
All tracks are written by Jerry Jeff Walker.

No.	Title	Length
1.	"Gettin' By"	3:57
2.	"Gypsy Songman"	2:36
3.	"Little Bird"	2:59
4.	"I Makes Money (Money Don't Make Me)"	2:42
5.	"Mr. Bojangles"	5:15
6.	"Hill Country Rain"	4:23
7.	"Charlie Dunn"	3:29
8.	"My Old Man"	4:58
9.	"Wheel"	4:28
10.	"Old Road"	2:09
Total length:		36:56

== Personnel ==
Steve Earle & The Dukes

- Steve Earle – guitar, mandolin, octave mandolin, harmonica, vocals, producer
- Chris Masterson – guitar, mandolin, vocals
- Eleanor Whitmore – fiddle, strings, mandolin, vocals
- Ricky Ray Jackson – pedal steel guitar, dobro, vocals
- Jeff Hill – acoustic and electric bass, cello, vocals
- Brad Pemberton – drums, percussion, vocals

Additional musicians

- Tony Leone – drums, vocals
- Ray Kennedy – recording, mixing, mastering
- Lauren Marquez – recording assistant
- Adam Hong – recording assistant
- Greg "Chief" Frahn – guitar tech
- Tony Fitzpatrick – cover art
- Danny Clinch – photography, back cover
- Scott Newton – photography
- Tom Bejgrowicz – package design and layout
- Kim Buie – A&R
- Danny Goldberg – management
- Jesse Bauer – management
- Danny Bland – tour management
- Butch Gage – business management
- Dan Goscombe – business management
- Rosemary Carroll – legal
- Paul Fenn – booking
- Lance Roberts – booking
- Bobbie Gale – publicity
- Claire Horton – publicity
- Richard Wootton – publicity

== Charts ==
Chart performance for Jerry Jeff
Chart (2022)	Peak position
Scottish Albums (Official Charts)	20
UK Country Albums (Official Charts)	1
UK Independent Albums (Official Charts)	9
US Top Album Sales (Billboard)	30
