= Train a Comin' =

Studio album by Steve Earle
- Released: February 28, 1995
- Genres: Country; country folk
- Length: 40:21
- Labels: Winter Harvest, Inc
- Producers: Steve Earle, William Alsobrook

Steve Earle chronology
The Hard Way (1990)	Train a Comin' (1995)	I Feel Alright (1996)

Professional ratings
Review scores
Source	Rating
AllMusic	4.5/5 stars
Entertainment Weekly	B
The Rolling Stone Album Guide	4/5 stars
Spin	8/10
The Village Voice	A−

Train a Comin' is the fifth studio album by Steve Earle (his first in five years), released in 1995. In addition to Earle, it features Peter Rowan, Norman Blake, Roy Huskey, and Emmylou Harris. The album was nominated for a Grammy for Best Contemporary Folk Album.

== Background ==
Train a Comin' was the first album recorded after Earle overcame his addiction to drugs in the fall of 1994, after being convicted for possession. Earle's last studio album had been the 1990 album The Hard Way, and he essentially stopped touring by 1992 as his addiction worsened.

Most of the songs on the album are older material written when Earle was in his late teens and twenties, including "Hometown Blues," "Sometimes She Forgets," "Mercenary Song," "Ben McCulloch," "Nothin' Without You," and "Tom Ames' Prayer." "Goodbye" was written while Earle was in court-ordered rehab in the fall of 1994. In concerts, Earle introduces the song as the first song he wrote clean, and as a "ninth step in the key of C," referring to the step in which an addict seeks to make amends. According to the liner notes of the album, "Angel is the Devil" was one of only four songs written during his hiatus, which he refers to as his "vacation in the ghetto," and the mandolin line of "Mystery Train part II" was written in the early 1990s with the lyrics finished the day it was recorded. The album also includes an instrumental by Norman Blake and three covers: Townes Van Zandt's "Tecumseh Valley", the Beatles' "I'm Looking Through You" and The Melodians' reggae standard "Rivers of Babylon."

Earle drew on established bluegrass and acoustic instrumentalists for the album, which was a departure from his earlier work with backing band the Dukes. He said to an interviewer at the time that he was seeking an older sound, and the album was recorded in just five days. "I was goin' for a sound where it sounded like old Opry stuff, where everybody stepped around the mike, which is real close to what we actually did. It ended up being even more of an organic record than I thought it was gonna be."

Earle co-produced the album with his friend William Alsobrook. Tension arose when the album was resequenced by Winter Harvest/Warner Brothers before release. Subsequent pressings of the album used Earle's initial sequencing.

== Reception ==
The album was well received by critics. The album was nominated for a 1996 Grammy in the "Best Contemporary Folk" category, losing out to Emmylou Harris's Wrecking Ball, which included a cover of Earle's "Goodbye" with him on guitar. USA Today named the album the number one country album of the year.

== Album art ==
The cover artwork was created by Nashville artist Robin Gustlin (Rogers). (Note: Cover artwork commissioned by William Alsobrook.)

== Track listing ==
All tracks are written by Steve Earle unless otherwise noted.

Listing reflects Earle's sequencing of the record.
No.	Title	Writer(s)	Length
1.	"Mystery Train Part II"		2:31
2.	"Hometown Blues"		2:41
3.	"Sometimes She Forgets"		3:01
4.	"Mercenary Song"		2:39
5.	"Goodbye"		4:57
6.	"Tom Ames' Prayer"		3:02
7.	"Nothin' Without You"		3:02
8.	"Angel Is the Devil"		2:12
9.	"I'm Looking Through You"	John Lennon, Paul McCartney	2:28
10.	"Northern Winds"	Norman Blake	1:40
11.	"Ben McCulloch"		4:10
12.	"Rivers of Babylon"	Brent Gayford Dowe, James Augustus McNaughton, Frank Farian, George Reyam	3:03
13.	"Tecumseh Valley"	Townes Van Zandt	4:28

== Personnel ==
- Steve Earle – guitar, high string guitar, 12 string guitar, harmonica, mandolin, vocals
- Peter Rowan – mandolin, mandola, gut string guitars, vocals
- Norman Blake – Hawaiian guitar, dobro, mandolin, fiddle, guitar
- Roy Huskey, Jr. – acoustic bass (and inspiration on "I'm Looking Through You")
- Emmylou Harris – vocals on "Nothin' Without You" and "The Rivers of Babylon"
