= Washington Square Serenade =

Studio album by Steve Earle
- Released: September 25, 2007
- Studio: Electric Lady (New York City)
- Length: 42:07
- Label: New West
- Producer: John King

Steve Earle chronology
The Revolution Starts Now (2004)	Washington Square Serenade (2007)	Townes (2009)

Professional ratings
Aggregate scores
Source	Rating
Metacritic	72/100
Review scores
Source	Rating
AllMusic	3.5/5 stars
Guardian Unlimited	3/5 stars
Pitchfork	5.0/10
Rolling Stone	3/5 stars
Uncut	4/5 stars

Washington Square Serenade is the 12th studio album by American singer-songwriter Steve Earle, released in 2007. The album features the singer's wife Allison Moorer on the track "Days Aren't Long Enough," and the Brazilian group Forro in the Dark on the track "City of Immigrants." The track "Way Down in the Hole," written by Tom Waits, was used as the opening theme song for the fifth and final season of the HBO series The Wire, on which Earle played a recurring character named Walon. The album was released on September 25, 2007, on New West Records. In February 2008 it won a Grammy Award for Best Contemporary Folk/Americana Album.

== Track listing ==
All songs written by Steve Earle unless otherwise noted.

1. "Tennessee Blues" – 2:39
2. "Down Here Below" – 4:02
3. "Satellite Radio" – 4:09
4. "City of Immigrants" – 4:18
5. "Sparkle and Shine" – 3:12
6. "Come Home to Me" – 3:47
7. "Jericho Road" – 3:36
8. "Oxycontin Blues" – 2:54
9. "Red Is the Color" – 4:19
10. "Steve's Hammer (For Pete)" – 3:15
11. "Days Aren't Long Enough" (Earle, Allison Moorer) – 3:01
12. "Way Down in the Hole" (Tom Waits) – 2:55

== Personnel ==
=== Musicians ===
- Steve Earle - vocals, guitar, mandolin, bouzouki, banjo, harmonica, tambura, harmonium
- Allison Moorer - vocals
- John Medeski - organ, electric piano, mellotron, harmonium
- Jeremy Chatzky - acoustic, electric bass
- John Spiker - electric bass
- Marty Beller - drums
- Patrick Earle - percussion
- Forro in the Dark:
  - Mauro Refosco - zabumba
  - Davi Viera - timba, triangle
  - Jorge Continentino - bamboo flute
  - Smokey Hormel - baritone guitar
- "The Downtown Proletariat Choir":
  - Patrick Earle, John King, Noah Goldstein, Josh Wilbur, Lee Foster, Charlie Stavish, Paul Bannister, Collin Hart, Petey

=== Production ===
- Produced and mixed by John King
- Recorded at Electric Lady Studios, New York City
- Mixed at The Nest, Hollywood, California
- Engineered by Josh Wilbur & Tom Camuso
  - Assisted by Noah Goldstein
- Programming by Andrew Clark & John Spiker
- Logistics - Patrick Earle
- "Pro Tools Therapy" - Ray Kennedy
- Mastered - Jim Demain at Yes Master Studios
  - Assisted by Alex McCollough

=== Artwork ===
- Cover artwork by Tony Fitzpatrick
- Photos by Ted Barron
- Design by Dawn Hancock for Firebelly Design

== Charts ==
Chart performance
Chart (2007)	Peak position
Canadian Albums (Nielsen SoundScan)	39
Dutch Albums (Album Top 100)	76
Dutch Alternative Albums (Alternative Top 30)	10
Scottish Albums (Official Charts)	31
Swedish Albums (Sverigetopplistan)	28
UK Albums (Official Charts)	55
UK Country Albums (Official Charts)	1
UK Independent Albums (Official Charts)	5
US Billboard 200	79
US Independent Albums (Billboard)	10
US Indie Store Album Sales (Billboard)	14
US Top Country Albums (Billboard)	10
