= The Company We Keep =

Studio album by Del McCoury Band
- Released: July 12, 2005
- Genre: Bluegrass music
- Label: McCoury Music
- Producer: Del McCoury, Ronnie McCoury

Professional ratings
Review scores
Source	Rating
AllMusic	4/5 stars

The Company We Keep is an album by the Del McCoury Band, released through McCoury Music on July 12, 2005. In 2006, the album won the band the Grammy Award for Best Bluegrass Album.

== Track listing ==
1. "Nothin' Special" (Walton) – 3:12
2. "Never Grow Up Boy" (Allen, McCoury) – 3:21
3. "If Here Is Where You Are" (McCoury, Schlitz) – 2:41
4. "She Can't Burn Me Now" (New, Silbar) – 3:55
5. "Mountain Song" (Keel) – 3:43
6. "Untamed" (Meyer) – 3:17
7. "Seventh Heaven" (McCoury) – 4:06
8. "Fathers and Sons" (Nicholson) – 3:22
9. "When It Stops Hurtin'" (Walton) – 3:26
10. "Keep Her While She's There" (Allen, McCoury) – 2:45
11. "When Fall's Coming Down" (Presley, Presley) – 3:27
12. "I Never Knew Life" (Mumpower-Johnson, Salley) – 3:58
13. "Eyes That Won't Meet Mine" (Simos) – 3:22
14. "Blown Away and Gone" (Simos, Weisberger) – 3:53

== Personnel ==
- Mike Bub – Bass, Vocals, Baritone (Vocal)
- Neal Cappellino – Engineer, Mixing
- Chris Harris – Art Direction
- Del McCoury – Guitar, Vocals, Producer, Baritone (Vocal), Tenor (Vocal)
- Rob McCoury – Banjo, Guitar, Vocals, Baritone (Vocal)
- Ronnie McCoury – Mandolin, Vocals, Producer, Tenor (Vocal)
- Señor McGuire – Photography
- Stan Strickland – Art Direction
- Hank Williams – Mastering

== Chart performance ==
Chart (2005)	Peak position
U.S. Billboard Top Bluegrass Albums	2
U.S. Billboard Top Country Albums	59
