= Just an American Boy =

Just An American Boy

Live album by Steve Earle
- Released: September 9, 2003
- Recorded: Live Somewhere in North America by Matt Svobodny & Eric Ambel except; "Time You Waste" recorded and mixed at Room & Board by Ray Kennedy
- Genre: Country, Country rock
- Label: Artemis Records
- Producer: the Twangtrust

Steve Earle chronology
| Together at the Bluebird Café (1997) | Just An American Boy (2003) | Live From Austin, TX (2004) |

Professional ratings
Review scores
| Source | Rating |
|---|---|
| Allmusic | 4/5 stars |

Just An American Boy is a live album by Steve Earle. The album was released in 2003.

== Track listing ==
All songs written by Steve Earle unless otherwise noted.

1. "Audience Intro" - 0:28
2. "Amerika V. 6.0 (The Best We Can Do)" - 4:37
3. "Ashes to Ashes" - 4:08
4. "Paranoia [Monologue]" - 1:28
5. "Conspiracy Theory" - 4:23
6. "I Remember You" - 3:10
7. "Schertz, Texas [Monologue]" - 2:51
8. "Hometown Blues" - 3:52
9. "The Mountain" - 5:38
10. "Pennsylvania Miners [Monologue]" - 1:08
11. "Harlan Man" - 3:29
12. "Copperhead Road" - 6:28
13. "Guitar Town" - 2:42
14. "I Oppose the Death Penalty [Monologue]" - 0:46
15. "Over Yonder (Jonathan's Song)" - 4:19
16. "Billy Austin" - 6:54
17. "Audience Intro" - 0:24
18. "South Nashville Blues" - 3:00
19. "Rex's Blues/Ft. Worth Blues" - 6:56 (Townes Van Zandt)
20. "John Walker's Blues" - 3:29
21. "Jerusalem" - 4:07
22. "The Unrepentant" - 6:55
23. "Christmas in Washington" - 10:32
24. "Democracy [Monologue]" - 1:51
25. "(What's So Funny 'Bout) Peace, Love, and Understanding" - 3:39 (Nick Lowe)
26. "Time You Waste" - 3:41 (Justin Earle)

== Personnel ==
- Steve Earle - guitar, mandolin, harmonica, vocals, rhetoric
- Eric “Roscoe” Ambel - guitar, vocals
- Kelley Looney - bass guitar, vocals
- Will Rigby - drums, percussion, vocals
- Patrick Earle - percussion
- Garrison Starr - vocals on "I Remember You" and "Conspiracy Theory"
- Justin Townes Earle - guitars and keyboards

The Bluegrass Dukes are:

- Tim O'Brien - mandolin and vocals
- Darrell Scott - banjo and vocals
- Dennis Crouch - dog house bass
- Casey Driessen - fiddle

== Chart performance ==
Chart performance for Just An American Boy
| Chart (2003) | Peak position |
|---|---|
| US Top Country Albums (Billboard) | 43 |
| US Independent Albums (Billboard) | 35 |
