= Terraplane (album) =

Studio album by Steve Earle
- Released: February 16, 2015
- Genre: Blues
- Length: 36:06
- Label: New West
- Producer: R. S. Field

Steve Earle chronology
| The Low Highway (2013) | Terraplane (2015) | So You Wannabe An Outlaw (2017) |

Professional ratings
Aggregate scores
| Source | Rating |
|---|---|
| Metacritic | 69/100 |
Review scores
| Source | Rating |
| AllMusic | 4/5 stars |

Terraplane is the sixteenth studio album by American singer-songwriter Steve Earle. An album of songs in the blues genre, it was released in 2015 through New West Records. The album sold 11,200 copies in its first week of release, debuting at number 39 on the Billboard 200.

== Track listing ==
All tracks are written by Steve Earle.

| No. | Title | Length |
|---|---|---|
| 1. | "Baby Baby Baby (Baby)" | 3:37 |
| 2. | "You're the Best Lover That I Ever Had" | 4:07 |
| 3. | "The Tennessee Kid" | 4:05 |
| 4. | "Ain't Nobody's Daddy Now" | 2:29 |
| 5. | "Better Off Alone" | 4:26 |
| 6. | "The Usual Time" | 2:59 |
| 7. | "Go-Go Boots Are Back" | 3:33 |
| 8. | "Acquainted with the Wind" | 2:20 |
| 9. | "Baby's Just as Mean as Me" | 2:35 |
| 10. | "Gamblin' Blues" | 2:04 |
| 11. | "King of the Blues" | 3:51 |
| Total length: | | 36:06 |

== Chart performance ==
| Chart (2015) | Peak position |
|---|---|
| US Billboard 200 | 39 |
| US Top Blues Albums (Billboard) | 1 |
| US Top Country Albums (Billboard) | 3 |
| US Americana/Folk Albums (Billboard) | 2 |
| US Independent Albums (Billboard) | 3 |
| US Top Rock Albums (Billboard) | 6 |
