= The Revolution Starts Now (album) =

The Revolution Starts... Now

Studio album by Steve Earle
- Released: August 24, 2004
- Genre: Cowpunk
- Length: 39:21
- Label: E-Squared Records
- Producers: Steve Earle, Ray Kennedy

Steve Earle chronology
Jerusalem (2002)	The Revolution Starts... Now (2004)	Washington Square Serenade (2007)

Professional ratings
Aggregate scores
Source	Rating
Metacritic	74/100
Review scores
Source	Rating
AllMusic	3.5/5 stars
Dirty Linen	(favorable)
Music Box	4/5 stars
Pitchfork	(6.8/10)
Rolling Stone	4/5 stars

The Revolution Starts... Now is the 11th studio album by American singer-songwriter Steve Earle, released in 2004.

Earle received the Grammy Award for Best Contemporary Folk Album for this album at the 47th Grammy Awards held February 13, 2005 at the Staples Center in Los Angeles, California.

== Track listing ==
All tracks composed by Steve Earle

1. "The Revolution Starts ..." – 3:10
2. "Home to Houston" – 2:41
3. "Rich Man's War" – 3:25
4. "Warrior" – 4:11
5. "The Gringo's Tale" – 4:33
6. "Condi, Condi" – 3:08
7. "F the CC" – 3:12
8. "Comin' Around" – 3:41
9. "I Thought You Should Know" – 3:46
10. "The Seeker" – 3:11
11. "The Revolution Starts Now" – 4:23

== Personnel ==
- Steve Earle - guitars, mandola, organ, harmonica, harmonium, vocals

The Dukes

- Eric "Roscoe" Ambel - guitars, vocals
- Kelley Looney - bass, vocals
- Will Rigby - drums, percussion, vocals
- Patrick Earle - percussion
- Emmylou Harris - vocals on "Comin’ Around"
- String quartet on "The Gringo’s Tale", arranged and conducted by Chris Carmichael:
  - Chris Carmichael - viola
  - David Angell - violin
  - David Henry - cello
  - Edward Henry - violin

== Charts ==
Chart performance
Chart (2004)	Peak position
Canadian Albums (Nielsen SoundScan)	85
Dutch Albums (Album Top 100)	68
Irish Albums (IRMA)	60
Norwegian Albums (VG-lista)	22
Scottish Albums (Official Charts)	31
Swedish Albums (Sverigetopplistan)	20
UK Albums (Official Charts)	66
UK Country Albums (Official Charts)	1
UK Independent Albums (Official Charts)	8
US Billboard 200	89
US Independent Albums (Billboard)	7
US Top Country Albums (Billboard)	12
