= Jason Carter (fiddler) =

American bluegrass musician (born 1973)

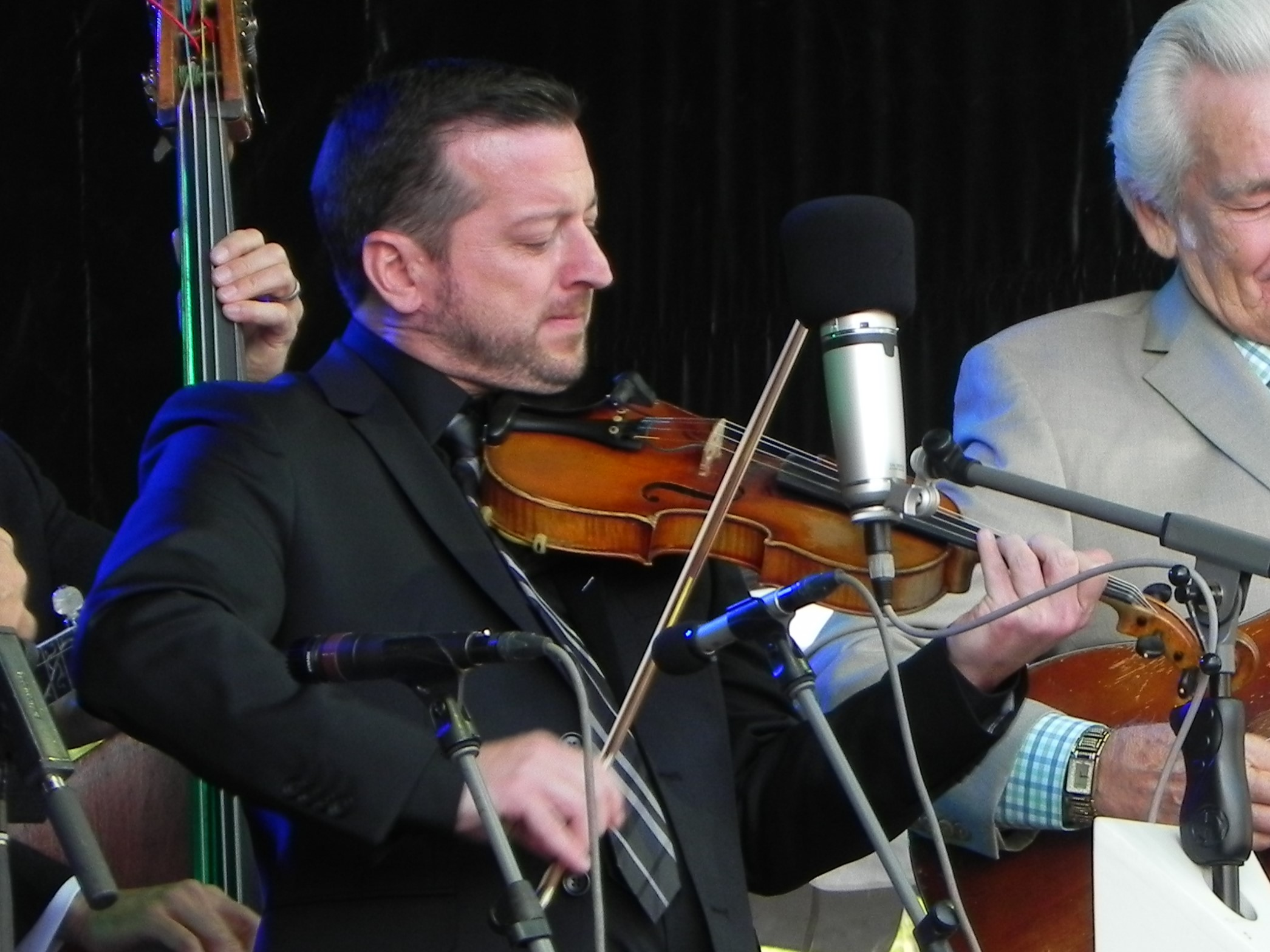
- Jason Carter at Delfest 2015

Background information
- Born: February 1, 1973 (age 53); Ashland, Kentucky, U.S.
- Genre: Bluegrass music
- Instrument: Fiddle
- Years active: 1991–present
- Labels: McCoury Music; Rounder

Jason Carter is an American bluegrass musician who plays fiddle. He is best known for his work with the Del McCoury Band and the Travelin' McCourys, as well as his touring duet with Michael Cleveland.

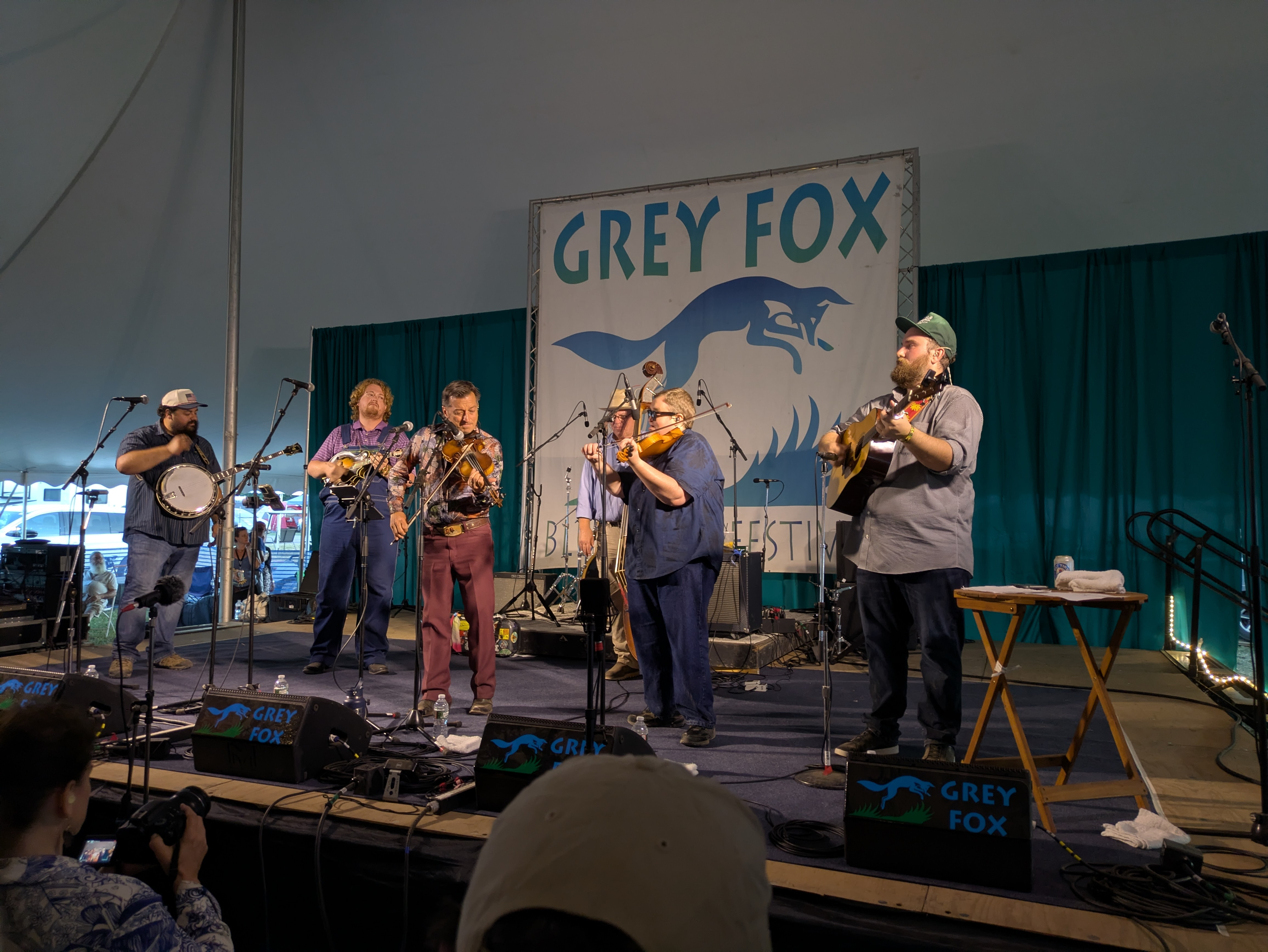
Carter performing as "Jason Carter and Michael Cleveland" at the 2026 Grey Fox Bluegrass Festival, with Cody Looper, Josh Gooding, and Jake Stargel

== Biography ==
Jason Carter was born in Ashland, Kentucky on February 1, 1973.

At the age of 8 he started playing guitar. He picked up the mandolin a few years later. He started playing fiddle at age 16 after hearing Del McCoury for the first time. Following high school graduation in 1991 from Greenup County High School, he joined The Goins Brothers, who he played with for six-months. During his time with the Goins Brothers, at a show in Nashville, Tennessee with Del McCoury, Carter approached McCoury and asked him for a job in his band. After a brief-tour that served as his audition, Carter was hired. He has been with the Del McCoury Band ever since. He has played with the Travelin' McCourys since their formation in 2009. Carter left both bands in 2025 to focus on his solo career.

In 2015 he was inducted into the Country Music Highway in Greenup County, Kentucky.

He has been named the International Bluegrass Music Association fiddle player of the year six times (1997, 1998, 2003, 2013, 2014, 2023).

Over the years Carter has recorded with and performed with a number of musicians including Billy Strings, Leftover Salmon, Yonder Mountain String Band, Dierks Bentley, Mac Wiseman, John Prine, The Osborne Brothers, June Carter, Marty Stuart, Lonesome River Band, Ricky Skaggs, Patty Loveless, Vince Gill, Ralph Stanley, Gibson Brothers (bluegrass duo), Sierra Hull, Sam Bush, Tony Rice, Jerry Douglas and Bela Fleck.

He has also appeared on the Late Show with David Letterman, the Conan O'Brien show, Jimmy Kimmel Live!, and The Tonight Show Starring Jimmy Fallon.

== Personal ==
Carter has been married to musician Bronwyn Keith-Hynes since October 2024. They were married at the Grand Ole Opry House in Nashville.

== Recordings ==
In addition to his work with the Del McCoury Band, Carter has released two solo albums, 1997's On The Move and 2022's Lowdown Hoedown.

== Discography ==
=== Solo recordings ===
- 1997: On The Move, Rounder
- 2022: Lowdown Hoedown, Fiddleman Records
