= Del McCoury Band =

American bluegrass band

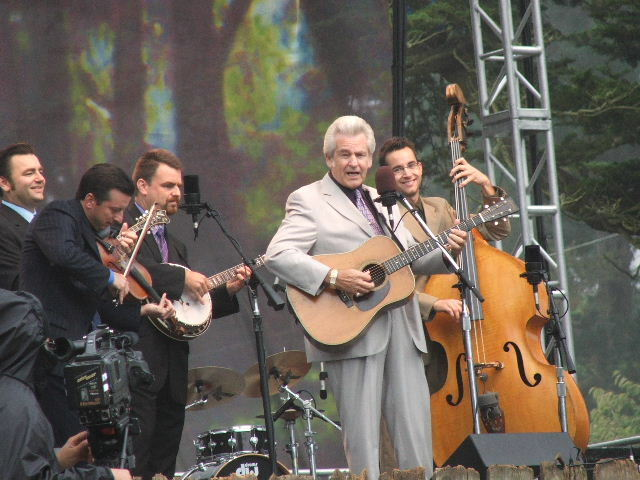
- Ronnie McCoury, Jason Carter, Rob McCoury, Del McCoury, and Alan Bartram performing at the Hardly Strictly Bluegrass Festival, San Francisco, California in 2005.

Background information
- Also known as: Del McCoury and the Dixie Pals (1967–1988)
- Genres: Bluegrass; Jam band
- Years active: 1967–present
- Label: Sugar Hill
- Members: Del McCoury; Ronnie McCoury; Rob McCoury; Alan Bartram; Christian Ward
- Website: www.delmccouryband.com

The Del McCoury Band is a Grammy Award-winning American bluegrass band.

== History ==
Originally the band was called Del McCoury and the Dixie Pals with Del on guitar and his brother Jerry on bass. The band went through a number of changes in personnel until the 1980s when the band solidified its line-up, adding McCoury's sons, Ronnie and Rob McCoury on mandolin and banjo, respectively. In 1988, the "Dixie Pals" name was dropped in favor of the current name. Fiddler Tad Marks and bass player Mike Brantley joined in the early 1990s while the band became a national touring act. The addition of fiddler Jason Carter and bassist Mike Bub in 1992 created a lineup that was unchanged for 13 years. Bub left the band in 2005 and was replaced by Alan Bartram. Carter announced in early 2025 that he was leaving the band to focus on his solo career.

=== Awards ===
In 1999 the Del McCoury band was named "Entertainer of the Year" at the International Bluegrass Music Awards.

In 2004 they were nominated for the Grammy Award for Best Bluegrass Album for It's Just the Night, and in 2006 they won that category for The Company We Keep.

=== Collaborations ===
The band recorded with Steve Earle on "I Still Carry You Around" on his 1997 album El Corazón. They shared co-billing on his 1999 album The Mountain.

The band has also often performed in recent years with the Lee Boys, with setlists mixing bluegrass, funk and gospel with extended jams on many songs.

=== Travelin' McCourys ===
The Travelin' McCourys are an offshoot of the Del McCoury Band, featuring all current (2009) members of the band minus Del, augmented by guitarist Cody Kilby on live performances.

The Travelin' McCourys also often play joint concerts with the Lee Boys.

== Band members ==
Del McCoury band at MerleFest in 2007

Current members

- Del McCoury - vocals, guitar (1967–present)
- Ronnie McCoury - vocals, mandolin (1981–present)
- Rob McCoury - vocals, banjo (1987–present)
- Alan Bartram - vocals, bass (August 2005–present)
- Christian Ward – vocals, fiddle (2025–present)

Former members

- Jerry McCoury - bass (1967–1989)
- Billy Baker - fiddle (1967)
- Mike Brantley - bass (1989–1992)
- Tad Marks - fiddle (1990–1992)
- Mike Bub - bass (May 1992–June 2005)
- Dennis Crouch - bass (July 2005)
- Jason Carter - fiddle (1992–2025)
- Dick Smith - banjo, mandolin
- Paul Silvius - banjo
- Sonny Miller - fiddle
- Dick Staber - mandolin

== Discography ==
=== Albums ===
Year	Album	Peak chart positions						
Year	Album	US Grass	US Country	US	US Indie	US Heat	US Christ	CAN Country
1992	Blue Side of Town	—	—	—	—	—	—	—
1993	A Deeper Shade of Blue	—	—	—	—	—	—	—
1996	The Cold Hard Facts	—	—	—	—	—	—	—
1999	The Mountain (with Steve Earle)	—	19	133	—	—	—	14
1999	The Family	—	—	—	—	—	—	—
2001	Del and The Boys	11	50	—	—	—	—	—
2003	It's Just the Night	4	47	—	32	48	—	—
2005	The Company We Keep	2	59	—	—	—	—	—
2006	The Promised Land	2	61	—	46	39	24	—
2008	Moneyland	1	51	—	—	—	—	—
2009	Family Circle	4	—	—	—	—	—	—
2011	American Legacies (with Preservation Hall Jazz Band)	4	—	—	—	—	—	—
2012	Old Memories: The Songs of Bill Monroe	6	—	—	—	—	—	—
2013	The Streets of Baltimore	5	69	—	—	—	—	—
2016	Del and Woody	1	42	—	—	17	—	—
2017	Del McCoury Still Sings Bluegrass	—	—	—	—	—	—	—
2022	Almost Proud							
2024	Songs of Love and Life							
"—" denotes releases that failed to chart

=== Music videos ===
Year	Title	Director
2003	"My Love Will Not Change"	
2003	"She Can't Burn Me Now"	

=== Contributions ===
- 2007: Ronnie McCoury - Little Mo' McCoury (McCoury Music)
- 2007: Various Artists: Song of America - "The Times They Are a-Changin'"
