= E-Squared Records =

Record label

E-Squared Records was a record label founded in 1996 by singer-songwriter and producer Steve Earle and seasoned music executive Jack Emerson. The label produced a series of albums by Earle, starting with 1996's I Feel Alright. Warner Bros. supported the label on many early releases. Earle and Emerson soon began signing and releasing additional artists, such as 6 String Drag, The V-Roys, Bap Kennedy, and Cheri Knight. According to Billboard the label developed a reputation for "releasing fine albums by artists who excel at songcraft and whose music is happily uncategorizable — hovering around rock, country and pop but never landing in any one camp."

Late in 1999, following the success of Steve Earle's collaboration with the Del McCoury Band, The Mountain, a co-venture was announced between E-Squared and Artemis Records. Artemis began providing support to E-Squared in areas of marketing, promotion, publicity and sales and in turn E-Squared began to act as an artist and repertoire source for Artemis.

E-Squared may have ceased operations a short time after the death of Jack Emerson on November 22, 2003. The label's Web site appears to have gone off-line in 2003, and Earle's 2004 album The Revolution Starts Now appears to be his last release on E-Squared (his 2007 album, Washington Square Serenade has been released on New West Records).
