= Rob McCoury =

American bluegrass musician (born 1971)

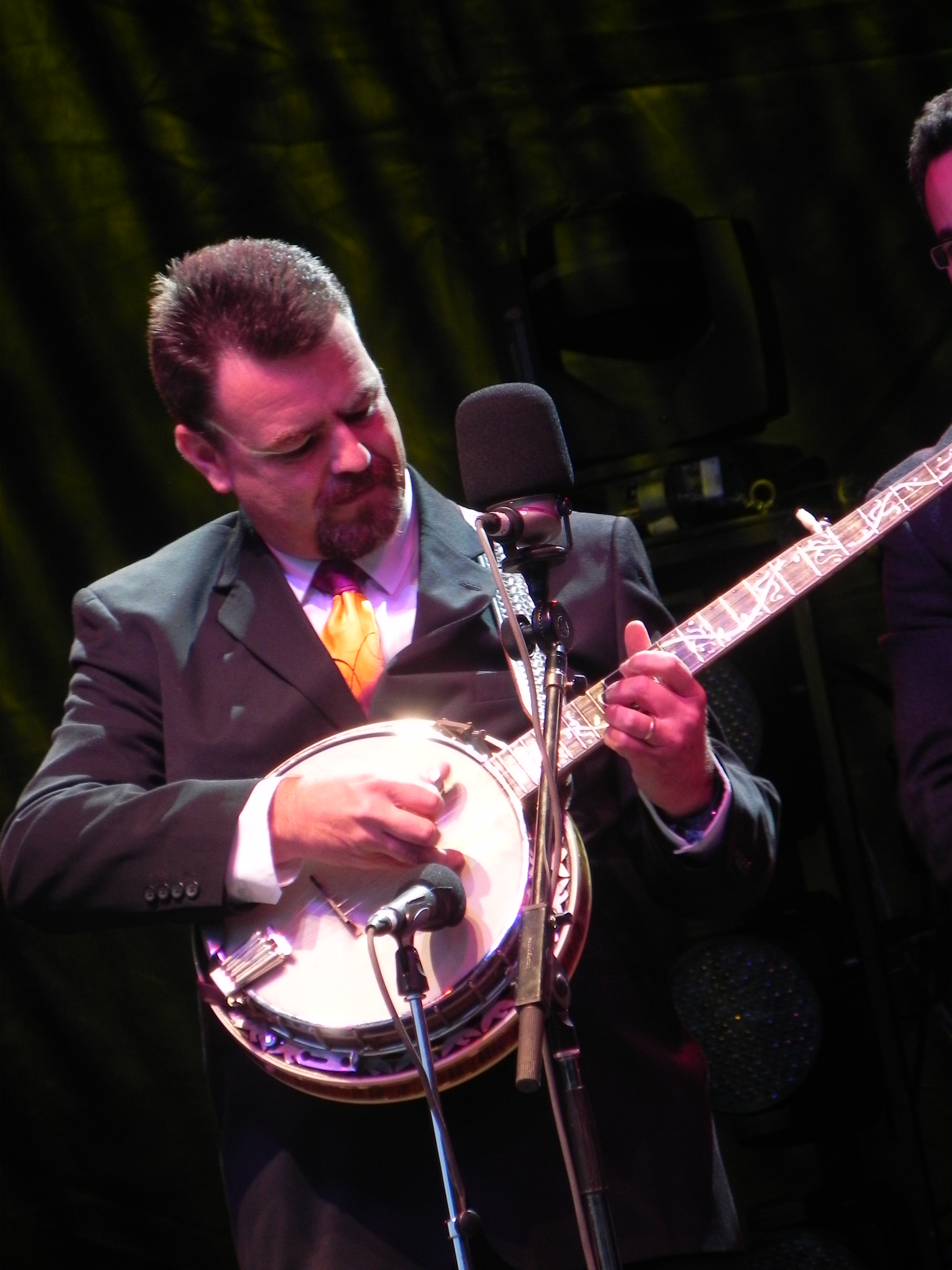
- McCoury at Delfest 2013

Background information
- Born: April 30, 1971 (age 54); York County, Pennsylvania
- Genres: Bluegrass music
- Instrument: Banjo
- Years active: 1986–present
- Labels: McCoury Music; Rounder

Rob McCoury is an American bluegrass musician who plays banjo. He is the son of bluegrass musician Del McCoury, and is best known for his work with the Del McCoury Band and the Travelin' McCourys.

== Biography ==
Rob McCoury was born in York County, Pennsylvania on April 30, 1971.

He was exposed to bluegrass from a young age through his father's band, Del McCoury & The Dixie Pals.

At the age of 8 he started playing the banjo after seeing The Osborne Brothers play at Sunset Park in West Grove, PA. In 1986, at the age of 15, he played bass with his dad's band for the first time at a festival in Bath, NY. He would play as the bassist for his dad's band for the next year and half. When the banjo spot opened up, he made the switch to his preferred instrument. His first show as a banjo player was in the spring of 1987 in Wilmington, DE at a benefit show for Ola Belle Reed, a singer/songwriter who penned one of his dad's most requested songs, “High On The Mountain,” along with many others. He has been with the band ever since.

McCoury graduated from Susquehannock High School in 1989, and in 2009 he and his brother Ronnie both received the High School's Distinguished Alumni Award.

He was named the 2015 International Bluegrass Music Association banjo player of the year in 2015.

== Recordings ==
In 1995 Rob and his brother Ronnie released a self-titled CD on Rounder Records. The album won the 1996 International Bluegrass Music Award for Recorded Performance of the Year.

== Personal life ==
Rob currently lives in Nashville, Tennessee, with his wife Lisa, and their three children.

== Discography ==
=== Solo recordings ===
- 2014: The 5 String Flamethrower (Rounder)

=== With Ronnie McCoury ===
- 1995: Ronnie & Rob McCoury (Rounder)
