= Steve Earle =

American country, rock, and folk singer-songwriter (born 1955)

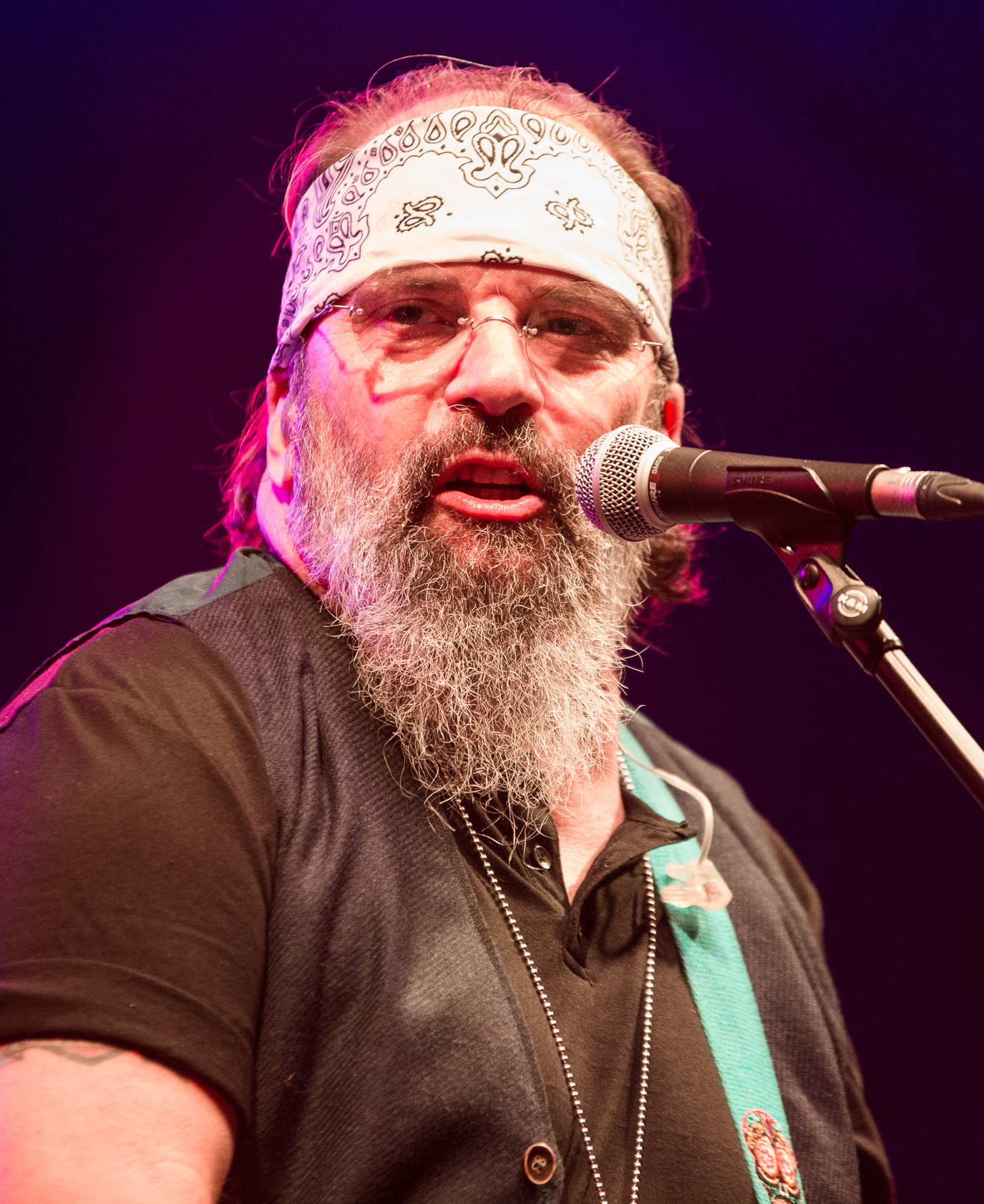
- Earle performing at the Rudolstadt-Festival in 2018

Background information
- Born: Stephen Fain Earle; January 17, 1955 (age 71); Fort Monroe, Virginia, U.S.
- Origin: San Antonio, Texas, U.S.
- Genres: Alternative country; country rock; outlaw country; contemporary folk
- Occupations: Musician; singer-songwriter; actor
- Instruments: Vocals; guitar; mandolin; harmonica; banjo; bouzouki; bass guitar
- Years active: 1968–present
- Labels: Uni; MCA Nashville; New West; E^{2} Records; Warner Bros.
- Website: steveearle.com

Stephen Fain Earle (/ɜːrl/; born January 17, 1955) is an American country, rock, and folk singer-songwriter and actor. He began his career as a songwriter in Nashville.

Earle's breakthrough album was his 1986 debut album Guitar Town; the eponymous lead single peaked at No. 7 on the Billboard Hot Country chart. Since then, he has released 21 more studio albums and received three Grammy awards, each for Best Contemporary Folk Album; he has four additional nominations in the same category. "Copperhead Road" was released in 1988 and is his bestselling single; it peaked on its initial release at No. 10 on the Mainstream Rock chart, and had a 21st-century resurgence reaching No. 15 on the Hot Rock & Alternative Songs chart, buoyed by vigorous online sales. His songs have been recorded by Johnny Cash, Waylon Jennings, Willie Nelson, Levon Helm, The Highwaymen, Travis Tritt, Vince Gill, Patty Loveless, Shawn Colvin, Bob Seger, Percy Sledge, Dailey & Vincent, Robert Earl Keen, and Emmylou Harris.

Earle has appeared in film and television, most notably as recurring characters in HBO's critically acclaimed shows The Wire and Treme. He has also written a novel, a play, and a book of short stories. Earle is the father of late singer-songwriter Justin Townes Earle.

He was inducted into the Nashville Songwriters Hall of Fame in 2020, and became a member of the Grand Ole Opry in 2025.

== Early life ==
Earle was born on January 17, 1955, in Fort Monroe, Virginia, where his father was stationed as an air traffic controller. The family moved to Texas before Earle's second birthday and he grew up primarily in the San Antonio area.

Earle began learning the guitar at the age of 11 and entered a school talent contest at age 13. He ran away from home at age 14 to search for his idol, singer-songwriter Townes Van Zandt. Earle was "rebellious" as a young man and dropped out of school at the age of 16. He moved to Houston with his 19-year-old uncle, also a musician. While in Houston, Earle finally met Van Zandt. Earle was opposed to the Vietnam War as he recalled in 2012: "The antiwar movement was a very personal thing for me. I didn't finish high school, so I wasn't a candidate for a student deferment. I was fucking going." The end of the Selective Service Act and the draft lottery in 1973 prevented him from being drafted, but several of his friends were drafted, which he credits as the origin of his politicization. Earle also noted that when he was a young man, his girlfriend was able to get an abortion despite the fact that abortion was illegal. Her father was a doctor at the local hospital in San Antonio, while several other girls he knew at the time were not able to get abortions; they lacked access to those with the necessary power to arrange an abortion, which he credits as the origin of his pro-choice views.

== Career ==
=== 1974–1999 ===
In 1974, at the age of 19, Earle moved to Nashville and began working blue-collar jobs during the day and playing music at night. During this period Earle wrote songs and played bass guitar in Guy Clark's band and sang on Clark's 1975 album Old No. 1. Earle appeared in the 1976 film Heartworn Highways, a documentary on the Nashville music scene which included David Allan Coe, Guy Clark, Townes van Zandt, and Rodney Crowell. Earle lived in Nashville for several years and assumed the position of staff songwriter at the publishing company Sunbury Dunbar. Later Earle grew tired of Nashville and returned to Texas, where he started a band called The Dukes.

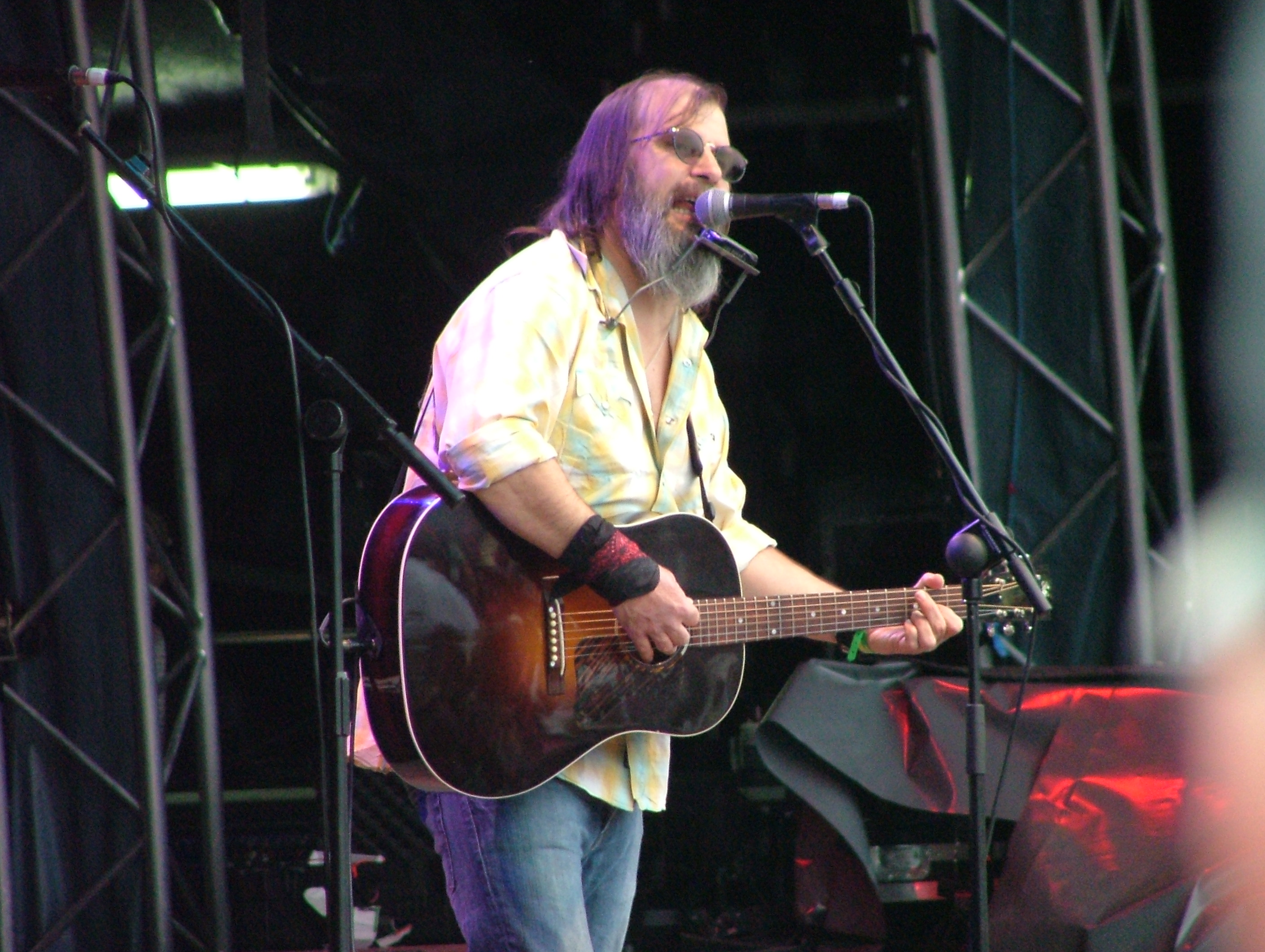
Earle performing in 2007 at the Midlands Music Festival in Westmeath, Ireland

In the 1980s, Earle returned to Nashville once again and worked as a songwriter for the publishers Roy Dea and Pat Carter. A song he co-wrote, "When You Fall in Love," was recorded by Johnny Lee and made No. 14 on the country charts in 1982. Carl Perkins recorded Earle's song "Mustang Wine," and two of his songs were recorded by Zella Lehr. Later, Dea and Carter created an independent record label called LSI, and invited Earle to begin recording his own material on their label. Connie Smith recorded Earle's composition "A Far Cry from You" in 1985, which reached a minor position on the country charts, as well.

Earle released an EP called Pink & Black in 1982, featuring the Dukes. Acting as Earle's manager, John Lomax sent the EP to Epic Records, and they signed Earle to a recording contract in 1983. In 1983, Earle signed a record deal with CBS and recorded a "neo-rockabilly album."

After losing his publishing contract with Dea and Carter, Earle met producer Tony Brown, and after severing his ties with Lomax and Epic Records, obtained a seven-record deal with MCA Records. Earle released his first full-length album, Guitar Town, on MCA Records in 1986. The title track became a Top 10 single in 1986, and his song "Goodbye's All We've Got Left" reached the Top 10 in 1987. That same year, he released a compilation of earlier recordings, titled Early Tracks, and an album with the Dukes, called Exit 0, which "received critical acclaim" for its blend of country and rock.

Earle released Copperhead Road on Uni Records in 1988, which was characterized as "a quixotic project that mixed a lyrical folk tradition with hard rock and eclectic Irish influences such as The Pogues, who guested on the record." The album's title track portrays a Vietnam veteran who uses his family background in running moonshine to become a marijuana grower/seller. It was Earle's highest-peaking song to date in the United States, and it had sold 1.1 million digital copies there as of September 2017.

His 1990 album The Hard Way had a strong rock sound and was followed by "a shoddy live album" called Shut Up and Die Like an Aviator. In August 1991, Earle appeared on the TV show The Texas Connection "looking pale and blown out." In light of Earle's "increasing drug use," MCA Records did not renew his contract, and Earle did not record any music for the next four years. By July 1993, Earle was reported to be improving, having regained his normal weight, and he had started to write new material. At that time, a writer for the Chicago Sun-Times called Earle "a visionary symbol of the New Traditionalist movement in country music."

In 1994, two staff members at Warner/Chappell publishing company and Earle's former manager, John Dotson, created an in-house compact disc of Earle's songs titled Uncut Gems and showcased it to some recording artists in Nashville. This resulted in several of Earle's songs being recorded by Travis Tritt, Stacy Dean Campbell, and Robert Earl Keen. After his recording hiatus, Earle released Train a Comin' on Winter Harvest Records, and it was nominated for the Grammy Award for Best Contemporary Folk Album in 1996. The album was characterized as a return to the "folksy acoustic" sound of his early career.

In 1996, Earle formed his own record label, E-Squared Records, and released the album I Feel Alright, which combined the musical sounds of country, rock, and rockabilly. Earle released the album El Corazon (The Heart) in 1997, which one reviewer called "the capstone of this [Earle's] remarkable comeback".

According to Earle, he wrote the song "Over Yonder" about a death-row inmate with whom he exchanged letters, before attending his execution in 1998. He made a foray into bluegrass-influenced music in 1999, when he released the album The Mountain with the Del McCoury Band.

In 2000, Earle recorded his album Transcendental Blues, which features the song "Galway Girl."

=== 2000–present ===
Earle presented excerpts of his poetry and fiction writing at the 2000 New Yorker Festival. His novel, I'll Never Get Out of This World Alive, was published in the spring of 2011, and a collection of short stories called Doghouse Roses followed that June. Earle wrote and produced an off-Broadway play about the death of Karla Faye Tucker, the first woman executed since the death penalty was reinstated in Texas.

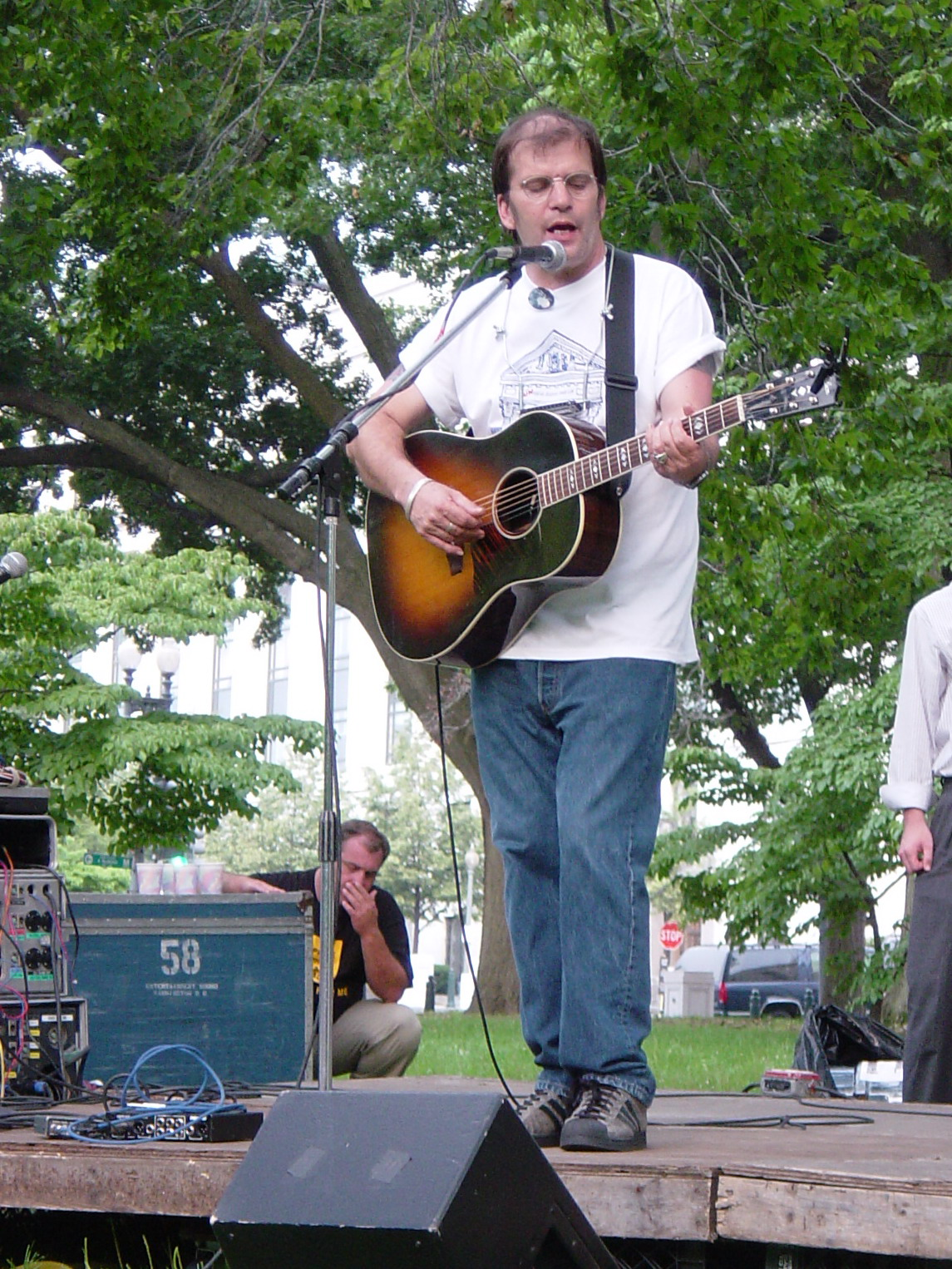
Earle performing in front of the United States Supreme Court on July 1, 2003

In the early 2000s, Earle's album Jerusalem expressed his anti-war, anti-death penalty and his other progressive views, so-called "leftist." The album's song "John Walker's Blues," about captured American Taliban fighter John Walker Lindh, created controversy. Earle responded by appearing on a variety of news and editorial programs and defending the song and his views on patriotism and terrorism. His subsequent tour featured the Jerusalem album and was released as the live album Just an American Boy in 2003.

In 2004, Earle released the album The Revolution Starts Now, a collection of songs influenced by the Iraq War and the policies of the George W. Bush administration; it won a Grammy for best contemporary folk album. The title song was used by General Motors in a TV advertisement. The album was released during the U.S. presidential campaign.

The song "The Revolution Starts Now" was used in the promotional materials for Michael Moore's antiwar documentary film Fahrenheit 9/11 and appears on the album Songs and Artists That Inspired Fahrenheit 9/11. That year, Earle was the subject of a documentary DVD called Just an American Boy. It was also used in the "Andor Season 2 trailer."

In 2006, Earle contributed a cover of Randy Newman's song "Rednecks" to the tribute album Sail Away: The Songs of Randy Newman. Earle hosted a radio show on Air America from August 2004 until June 2007. Later, he began hosting a show called Hardcore Troubadour on the Outlaw Country channel. Earle is also the subject of two biographies, Steve Earle: Fearless Heart, Outlaw Poet, by David McGee and Hardcore Troubadour: The Life and Near Death of Steve Earle by Lauren St John.

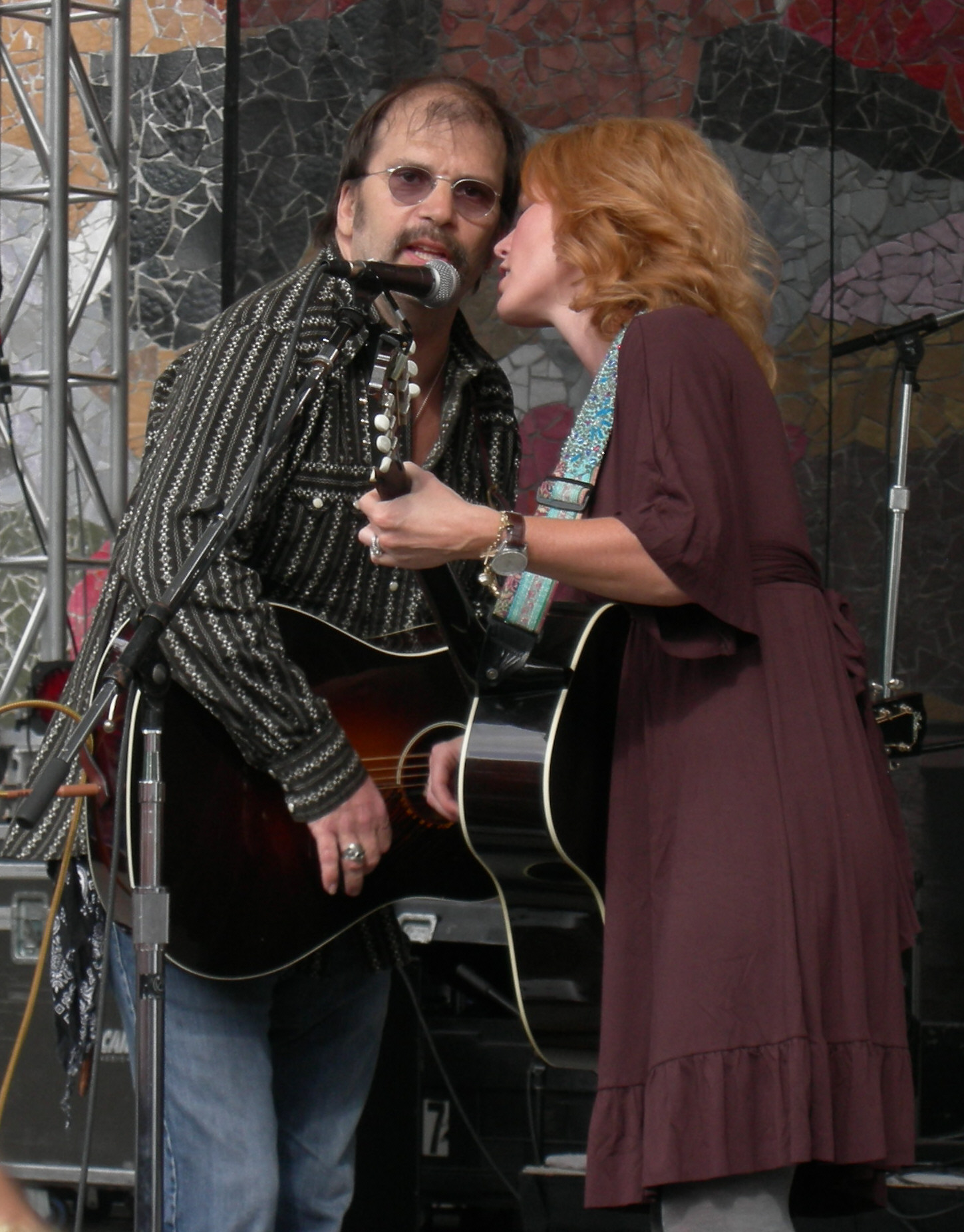
Steve Earle onstage with Allison Moorer at the Bumbershoot event in 2007

In September 2007, Earle released his 12th studio album, Washington Square Serenade, on New West Records. Earle recorded the album after relocating to New York City, and this was his first use of digital audio recording. The album features Earle's then-wife Allison Moorer on "Days Aren't Long Enough" and "Down Here Below". The album includes Earle's version of Tom Waits' song "Way Down in the Hole", which was the theme song for the fifth season of the HBO series The Wire in which Earle appeared as a recovering drug addict and drug counselor named Walon (Earle's character appears in the first, fourth, and fifth seasons). In 2008, Earle produced Joan Baez's album Day After Tomorrow. Prior to their collaboration on Day After Tomorrow, Baez had covered two Earle songs, "Christmas in Washington" and "Jerusalem", on previous albums; "Jerusalem" had also become a staple of Baez' concerts. In the winter, he toured Europe and North America in support of Washington Square Serenade, performing both solo and with a disc jockey.

On May 12, 2009, Earle released a tribute album, Townes, on New West Records. The album contained 15 songs written by Townes Van Zandt. Guest artists appearing on the album included Tom Morello of Rage Against the Machine, Moorer, and his son Justin. The album earned Earle a third Grammy award, again for best contemporary folk album.

In 2010, Earle was awarded the National Coalition to Abolish the Death Penalty's Shining Star of Abolition award. Earle has recorded two other anti-death penalty songs: "Billy Austin", and "Ellis Unit One" for the 1995 film Dead Man Walking.

In 2010–11, Earle appeared in seasons one and two of the HBO show Treme as Harley Wyatt, a talented street musician who mentors another character.

In January 2012, Earle appeared in the closing credits of 30 Rock singing a song about Kenneth Parcell.

Earle released his first novel and 14th studio album, both titled I'll Never Get Out of This World Alive after a Hank Williams song, in the spring of 2011. The album was produced by T Bone Burnett and deals with questions of mortality with a "more country" sound than his earlier work. During the second half of his 2011 tour with The Dukes and Duchesses and Moorer, the drum kit was adorned with the slogan "we are the 99%", a reference to the Occupy movement of September 2011.

On February 17, 2015, Earle released his 16th studio album, Terraplane.

On September 10, 2015, Earle and the Dukes released a new internet single titled "Mississippi, It's Time". The song's lyrics are directed toward the state of Mississippi and its refusal to abandon the Confederate Flag and remove it from the state flag. The song was released for sale the following day with all proceeds going to the Southern Poverty Law Center, a civil-rights organization.

On June 10, 2016, Earle released an album of duets with Shawn Colvin, titled simply Colvin And Earle, which was accompanied by a tour in London and the US.

On June 16, 2017, Earle and the Dukes released his 17th studio album, So You Wannabe an Outlaw. GUY, Earle's tribute album to his songwriting hero Guy Clark, was released on March 29, 2019.

Earle was among hundreds of artists whose material was destroyed in the 2008 Universal fire. Earle was one of five artists who filed a class-action lawsuit against Universal on June 21 in response to an earlier Times report on the fire.

Earle was the musical director for the 2020 play Coal Country about the 2010 West Virginia mining disaster where 29 men died. The play by Jessica Blank and Eric Jensen ran at the Public Theater in New York and was cut short by the start of the COVID-19 pandemic. He was nominated for Drama Desk and Lucille Lortel awards for his work on the play's music. Songs from the play are on his 2020 album Ghosts of West Virginia.

In 2021, Earle joined Willie Nile on Nile's song "Blood on Your Hands", featured on Nile's album The Day the Earth Stood Still.

In 2023, Earle said he is working on a musical of the film Tender Mercies.

Earle features prominently in Love at the Five and Dime: The Songwriting Legacy of Nanci Griffith, a biography of the musical career of Griffith by Brian T. Atkinson

On April 26, 2025, Earle was invited by Vince Gill to become a member of the Grand Ole Opry.

In 2025 Earle was featured on Wake Up America on Willie Nile's The Great Yellow Light album.

Earle makes a cameo appearance in the 12th episode of the second season of the Peacock mystery series Poker Face as a truck driver.

=== The Steve Earle Show ===
The Steve Earle Show (formerly known as The Revolution Starts Now) was a weekly radio show on the Air America Radio network hosted by Earle. It highlighted some of Earle's favorite artists, blending in-studio performances with liberal political talk and commentary. The show aired Sundays on some Air America affiliates from 10 to 11 pm ET. The show last aired on June 10, 2007, and that was a rebroadcast of a past episode. Earle subsequently started DJing on a show on Sirius Satellite Radio called Hardcore Troubadour.

== Personal life ==
Steve Earle has been married seven times, including twice to the same woman. He married Sandra "Sandy" Henderson in Houston at the age of 18, and left her to move to Nashville a year later. There, he met and married his second wife, Cynthia Dunn. Earle married his third wife, Carol-Ann Hunter, who was the mother of their son, singer-songwriter Justin Townes Earle (1982–2020).

Next, he married Lou-Anne Gill (with whom he had a second son, Ian Dublin Earle, in January 1987). In December 1987, a groupie, Theresa Baker, claimed her daughter was fathered by Earle, though the initial DNA test was inconclusive and Earle did not submit to a second. His fifth wife was Teresa Ensenat, an A&R executive for Geffen Records at the time. He then married Lou-Anne Gill a second time, and finally, in 2005, he married singer-songwriter Allison Moorer, with whom he had a third son in April 2010. (In March 2014, Earle announced that Moorer and he had separated. Earle has primary custody of their child during the school year and then tours in the summer.

In 1993, Earle was arrested for possession of heroin, and in 1994 for cocaine and weapons possession. A judge sentenced him to a year in jail after he admitted possession and failed to appear in court. He was released from jail after serving 60 days of his sentence. He then completed an outpatient drug-treatment program at the Cedarwood Center in Hendersonville, Tennessee. As a recovering heroin addict, Earle has used his experiences in his songwriting.

Earle's sister, Stacey Earle, is also a musician and songwriter.

== Political views and activism ==
Earle is outspoken with his political views, and often addresses them in his lyrics and in interviews. Politically, he identifies as a socialist and tends to vote for Democratic candidates, despite not agreeing entirely with their politics. During the 2016 election, he expressed support for Senator Bernie Sanders, whom he considered to have pushed Hillary Clinton to the left on important issues. In a 2017 interview, Earle said about President Donald Trump: "We've never had an orangutan in the White House before. There's a lot of 'What does this button do?' going on. It's scary. He really is a fascist. Whether he intended to be or not, he's a real live fascist." However, Earle has called for the American left to engage with the concerns of working class Trump voters, saying in 2017: "… maybe that's one of the things we need to examine from my side because we're responsible. The left has lost touch with American people, and it's time to discuss that". In 2020, he stated: "I thought that, given the way things are now, it was maybe my responsibility to make a record that spoke to and for people who didn't vote the way that I did. One of the dangers that we're in is if people like me keep thinking that everyone who voted for Trump is a racist or an asshole, then we're fucked, because it's simply not true."

In his 1990 song "Justice in Ontario", Earle sang about the Port Hope 8 case. Earle criticized the conviction of six Satan's Choice bikers for a 1978 murder in Port Hope, arguing that the accused were innocent, framed by the ruthless Corporal Terry Hall of the Ontario Provincial Police's Special Squad. In the song Earle compares the conviction of the "Port Hope 6" to the massacre of the Black Donnellys in 1880. In 1990, Earle stated in an interview about "Justice in Ontario": "There's some concern about reprisals because the O.P.P. (Ontario Provincial Police) is obviously not gonna be thrilled. My hope is that I'll be far too out-in-the-open and far too public for the police to do anything and get away with it. But the point is, that's not a reason for doing or not doing anything, because…I very nearly went to prison myself for something I didn't do, simply because a law enforcement agency didn't want to admit that somebody had fucked up—they didn't want to open the whole can of worms and all the other complaints that were constantly brought against the Dallas police department. You can't stand by and let stuff like that go down without saying anything about it. And I think I especially have a responsibility to do that, 'cause if I didn't have any money right now I'd be in prison in Texas—I'm convinced of that. It was that close. But I was able to afford decent legal representation. And it comes down to the fact that people who can't afford decent legal representation—who are subject to something like this happening and turning out very badly—feed my kids. That's where my money comes from and that's where my freedom comes from".

In 2006, Earle, along with other artists, held a protest concert against the Iraq War. Earle is a vocal opponent of capital punishment, which he considers his primary area of political activism. Several of his songs have provided descriptions of the experiences of death row inmates, including "Billy Austin" and "Over Yonder (Jonathan's Song)". Conversely, he has also written a song from the perspective of a prison guard working on death row in "Ellis Unit One", a song written for the film Dead Man Walking, the title based on the name of the State of Texas men's death row.

He is pro-choice and has argued that rich Americans have always had access to abortions; he says the political issue in the US is really whether poor women should have access. His 2012 novel I'll Never Get Out of This World Alive describes the life of a morphine-addicted doctor in 1963 San Antonio before Roe v. Wade who treats gunshot wounds and provides illegal abortions to poor women. Since his youngest son was diagnosed with autism, Earle has also become an advocate for people on the autism spectrum.

== Discography ==
- Guitar Town (1986)
- Exit 0 (1987)
- Copperhead Road (1988)
- The Hard Way (1990)
- Train a Comin' (1995)
- I Feel Alright (1996)
- El Corazón (1997)
- The Mountain with the Del McCoury Band (1999)
- Transcendental Blues (2000)
- Jerusalem (2002)
- The Revolution Starts Now (2004)
- Washington Square Serenade (2007)
- Townes (2009)
- I'll Never Get Out of This World Alive (2011)
- The Low Highway (2013)
- Terraplane (2015)
- Colvin & Earle with Shawn Colvin (2016)
- So You Wanna Be an Outlaw (2017)
- Guy (2019)
- Ghosts of West Virginia (2020)
- J.T. (2021)
- Jerry Jeff (2022)

== Awards and nominations ==
=== Academy of Country Music Awards ===
Year	Category	Nominated work	Result
1987	Top New Male Vocalist	Himself	Nominated

=== Americana Music Honors & Awards ===
Year	Category	Nominated work	Result	Ref.
2004	Spirit of Americana/Free Speech Award	Himself	Won	
2005	Album of the Year	The Revolution Starts Now	Nominated	
2005	Song of the Year	"The Revolution Starts... Now"	Nominated	
2012	Album of the Year	I'll Never Get Out of This World Alive	Nominated	
2012	Song of the Year	"Waitin' On the Sky"	Nominated	
2015	Song of the Year	"You're the Best Lover That I Ever Had"	Nominated	
2021	Album of the Year	J.T.	Nominated	

=== Grammy Awards ===
The Grammy Awards are awarded annually by the National Academy of Recording Arts and Sciences to recognize outstanding achievements in music. Earle has won 3 awards from 16 nominations.

Year	Category	Nominated work	Result
1987	Best Country Song	"Guitar Town	Nominated
1987	Best Male Country Vocal Performance	Guitar Town	Nominated
1988	Best Male Country Vocal Performance	Exit 0	Nominated
1996	Best Contemporary Folk Album	Train a Comin'	Nominated
1999	Best Contemporary Folk Album	El Corazón	Nominated
2000	Best Bluegrass Album	The Mountain with Del McCoury Band	Nominated
2001	Best Contemporary Folk Album	Transcendental Blues	Nominated
2003	Best Contemporary Folk Album	Jerusalem	Nominated
2005	Best Contemporary Folk Album	The Revolution Starts Now	Won
2005	Best Solo Rock Vocal Performance	"The Revolution Starts Now"	Nominated
2008	Grammy Award for Best Country Collaboration with Vocals	"Days Aren't Long Enough" with Allison Moorer	Nominated
2008	Best Contemporary Folk/Americana Album	Washington Square Serenade	Won
2010	Best Contemporary Folk/Americana Album	Townes	Won
2011	Best Song Written for Visual Media	"This City" (from Tremé)	Nominated
2012	Best Folk Album	I'll Never Get Out of This World Alive	Nominated
2014	Best American Roots Song	"Invisible"	Nominated

Awards
Preceded by Kris Kristofferson	First Amendment Center/AMA "Spirit of Americana" Free Speech Award; 2004	Succeeded by Judy Collins
