= Tony Fitzpatrick (artist) =

American painter, poet, and actor (1958–2025)

- Fitzpatrick in 2008
- Born: November 24, 1958; Chicago, Illinois, U.S.
- Died: October 11, 2025 (aged 66); Chicago, Illinois, U.S.
- Known for: Collage, drawing, painting, poetry
- Movement: Chicago Imagist
- Children: 2
- Website: tonyfitzpatrick.co

Tony Fitzpatrick (November 24, 1958 – October 11, 2025) was an American artist, poet, and actor who drew on inspiration from his life in the Chicagoland Area. Fitzpatrick's signature artwork is based in printmaking and mixed-media collage. He published multiple books of his art and poetry in addition to having work exhibited at several art galleries across the United States.

== Early life ==
Fitzpatrick was born on November 24, 1958, in Chicago. One of eight children, Fitzpatrick was raised in Lombard, Illinois. The son of a WWII veteran and burial vault salesman, Fitzpatrick grew up Catholic in the Chicago suburbs. As a child, Fitzpatrick would accompany his father on business trips and listen to stories about life in Chicago. During his youth, Fitzpatrick also developed a keen interest in birds, which influenced his later work.

After attending Montini Catholic High School, he fell into a succession of temporary jobs including bouncer, cab driver, caddy, bartender, and day laborer. Fitzpatrick was also radio host for a time and later became a podcaster.

Fitzpartick studied art at the College of DuPage.

== Acting career ==
Fitzpatrick acted on stage at Steppenwolf Theatre in Chicago and in productions in New York City, and appeared in a number of major motion pictures and TV series including Patriot. He also appeared in 15 movies including Philadelphia and The Fugitive. In his final role, he will appear posthumously in a short film, Driven, made by his children Max and Gabrielle, debuting in the 33rd Chicago Underground Film Festival in September, 2026. He earned the Joseph Jefferson Award for Best Actor in 1991.

== Printmaking and publications ==
In 1992, Fitzpatrick opened a printmaking studio in Chicago, Big Cat Press, which later became the exhibition space, Firecat Projects, in 2010. Fitzpatrick later partnered to open Adventureland and also launched The Dime exhibition spaces. Fitzpatrick's artworks have been exhibited in the Metropolitan Museum of Art, Museum of Modern Art, The Art Institute of Chicago, Museum of Contemporary Art Chicago, Philadelphia Museum of Art, and the Smithsonian American Art Museum, among others.

Fitzpatrick drew inspiration from many sources, primarily drawing from Midwestern city life. In his artwork he often depicted native birds and incorporated elements of folk art. His work is visually busy, colorful, highly detailed and plays with the symbolic. Fitzpatrick combined drawings and original paintings with collage and poetry, where his images become narrative storytelling, and his writing becomes visual commentary. He had also designed his own tattoos and at one point was a tattoo artist himself.

Fitzpatrick's published books include The Wonder: Portraits of a Remembered City, volumes 1, 2 & 3, This Train: An Artist's Journal, with an introduction by Alex Kotlowitz, Bum Town, Dime Stories, The Secret Birds, Max and Gaby's Alphabet, Dirty Boulevard, The Apostles of Humboldt Park, and The Sun at the End of the Road: Dispatches from an American Life, published by Eckhartz Press right before his death.

== Personal life and death ==
Fitzpatrick was open about his struggle with alcohol and drugs, which would occasionally interfere with his life and work. In 2024, Fitzpatrick said that he had not consumed alcohol for a 33-year stretch at one point. Fitzpatrick married Michele Garrahy on June 5, 1991, with whom he had two children, Max and Gabrielle.

Fitzpatrick died from a heart attack at the Rush Medical Center in Chicago on October 11, 2025, at the age of 66.
