= Richard Bennett discography =

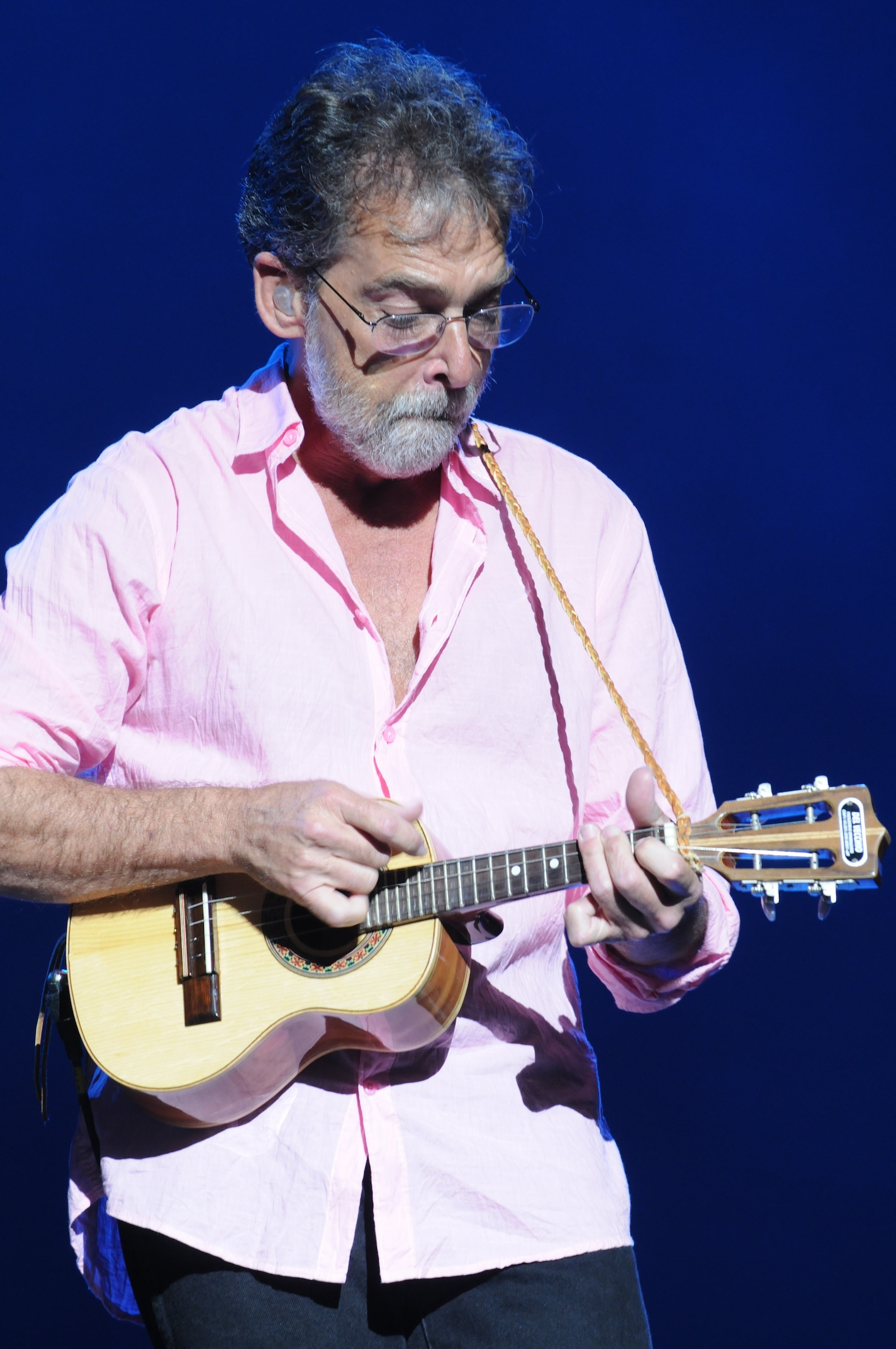
- Richard Bennett 18 July 2008 at the NAC in Ottawa

Richard Bennett is an American guitarist, composer, and record producer. In addition to his 5 solo albums, and his recordings with Neil Diamond and Mark Knopfler, he has been featured as a performer and producer on many albums by other artists.

== Solo albums ==
- 2004: Themes from a Rainy Decade (Moderne Shellac)
- 2008: Code Red Cloud Nine (Moderne Shellac)
- 2010: Valley of the Sun (Moderne Shellac)
- 2013: For the Newly Blue (Moderne Shellac)
- 2015: Contrary Cocktail (Moderne Shellac)
- 2018: Ballads in Otherness (Moderne Shellac)

== With Neil Diamond ==
- 1974: Serenade (Columbia)
- 1976: Beautiful Noise (Columbia)
- 1977: I'm Glad You're Here with Me Tonight (Columbia)
- 1978: You Don't Bring Me Flowers (Columbia)
- 1979: September Morn (Columbia)
- 1981: On the Way to the Sky (Columbia)
- 1982: Heartlight (Columbia)
- 1984: Primitive (Columbia)
- 1986: Headed for the Future (Columbia)
- 1988: The Best Years of Our Lives (Columbia)
- 2014: Melody Road (Capitol)
- 2016: Acoustic Christmas (Capitol)

== With Mark Knopfler ==
- 1996: Golden Heart (Warner Bros.)
- 2000: Sailing to Philadelphia (Warner Bros.)
- 2002: The Ragpicker's Dream (Warner Bros.)
- 2004: Shangri-La (Warner Bros.)
- 2006: All the Roadrunning (Mercury) with Emmylou Harris
- 2009: Get Lucky (Reprise)
- 2012: Privateering (Mercury)
- 2015: Tracker (Mercury)
- 2018: Down the Road Wherever (Virgin EMI)

== As composer ==
- 1988: Steve Earle - Copperhead Road (Uni) - track 8, ""Waiting on You" (co-written with Steve Earle)
- 1991: Steve Earle and the Dukes - Shut Up and Die Like an Aviator (MCA) - track 2, "Good Ol' Boy (Gettin' Tough)" (co-written with Steve Earle)

== As producer ==
- 1986: Steve Earle - Guitar Town (MCA) associate producer
- 1987: Steve Earle and the Dukes - Exit 0 (MCA) co-producer
- 1989: Emmylou Harris - Bluebird (Reprise) co-producer
- 1990: Emmylou Harris - Brand New Dance (Reprise) co-producer
- 1992: Emmylou Harris and the Nash Ramblers - At the Ryman (Reprise)
- 1994: Marty Brown - Cryin', Lovin', Leavin' (MCA)
- 1995: Kim Richey - Kim Richey (Mercury)
- 1996: Steve Earle - I Feel Alright (Warner Bros.) co-producer
- 2005: various artists - Train of Love: A Tribute to Johnny Cash (CMH)
- 2009: Phil Lee - So Long, It's Been Good to Know You (Palookaville)
- 2017: Steve Earle and the Dukes - So You Wannabe An Outlaw (Warner Bros.)

== Also appears on ==
=== 1972 - 1973 ===
- 1972: Four Tops - Keeper of the Castle (Dunhill)
- 1972: Alex Harvey - Souvenirs (Capitol)
- 1973: Vikki Carr - Ms. America (Columbia)
- 1973: Jim Grady - Jim Grady (20th Century)
- 1973: Chuck Jackson - Through All Times (ABC)
- 1973: Billy Joel - Piano Man (Columbia)
- 1973: Barbara Keith - Barbara Keith (Reprise)
- 1973: The Partridge Family - Bulletin Board (Bell)
- 1973: Austin Roberts - The Last Thing On My Mind (Chelsea)
- 1973: T-Bone Walker - Very Rare (Reprise)
- 1973: Andy Williams - Solitaire (Columbia)

=== 1974 - 1979 ===
- 1974: Karl Erikson - I Am Next (United Artists)
- 1974: Lobo - Just A Singer (Big Tree)
- 1974: Billy Joel - Streetlife Serenade (Columbia)
- 1974: Dave Mason - Dave Mason (Columbia)
- 1974: Kenny Rankin - Silver Morning (Little David
- 1974: Jim Stafford - Jim Stafford (MGM)
- 1974: Ringo Starr - Goodnight Vienna (Apple)
- 1975: Eric Andersen - Be True to You (Arista)
- 1975: Jim Stafford - Not Just Another Pretty Foot (MGM)
- 1976: Bellamy Brothers - Let Your Love Flow (Curb)
- 1977: Michael Omartian - Adam Again (Myrrh)
- 1977: Helen Reddy - Ear Candy (Capitol)
- 1978: Bellamy Brothers - Beautiful Friends (Warner Bros.)
- 1978: Helen Reddy - We'll Sing in the Sunshine (Capitol)
- 1978: Neil Diamond - You Don't Bring Me Flowers (Columbia)
- 1979: Dave Lambert - Framed (Polydor)

=== 1980 - 1985 ===
- 1980: Allan Clarke - Legendary Heroes (Elektra)
- 1981: Rodney Crowell - Rodney Crowell (Warner Bros.)
- 1981: Carole Bayer Sager - Sometimes Late at Night (Boardwalk)
- 1982: Rosanne Cash - Somewhere in the Stars (Columbia)
- 1983: Sissy Spacek - Hangin' Up My Heart (Atlantic)
- 1983: "Weird Al" Yankovic - "Weird Al" Yankovic (Rock 'n Roll)
- 1984: Vince Gill - Turn Me Loose (RCA)
- 1985: Vince Gill - The Things That Matter (RCA)
- 1985: George Strait - Something Special (MCA)

=== 1986 - 1999 ===
- 1986: Mac Davis - Somewhere in America (MCA)
- 1986: Waylon Jennings - Will the Wolf Survive (MCA)
- 1986: Nicolette Larson - Rose of My Heart (MCA)
- 1986: George Strait - #7 (MCA)
- 1986: Rodney Crowell - Street Language (CBS)
- 1987: Waylon Jennings - Hangin' Tough (MCA)
- 1987: Conway Twitty - Borderline (MCA)
- 1987: Ricky Van Shelton - Wild-Eyed Dream (Columbia)
- 1989: Lyle Lovett and his Large Band - Lyle Lovett and His Large Band (MCA / Curb)
- 1989: Juice Newton - Ain't Gonna Cry (RCA)
- 1990: Rosanne Cash - Rosanne Cash (Columbia)
- 1991: Vince Gill - Pocket Full of Gold (MCA)
- 1992: Alabama - American Pride (RCA Victor)
- 1992: Vince Gill - I Still Believe In You (MCA)
- 1992: Joan Baez - Play Me Backwards (Virgin)
- 1994: Hal Ketchum - Every Little Word (Curb)
- 1995: Emmylou Harris - Wrecking Ball (Elektra)
- 1995: Billy Pilgrim - Bloom (Atlantic)
- 1997: Matraca Berg - Sunday Morning to Sunday Nights (Rising)
- 1997: Phillips Craig & Dean - Where Strength Begins (Star Song Communications)
- 1998: Allison Moorer - Alabama Song (MCA)

=== 2000 - 2009 ===
- 2000: Allison Moorer - The Hardest Part (MCA Nashville)
- 2000: Trisha Yearwood - Real Live Woman (MCA Nashville)
- 2000: Wynonna Judd - New Day Dawning (Curb)
- 2002: Amy Grant - Legacy... Hymns and Faith (Word / A&M)
- 2004: Cerys Matthews - Cockahoop (Rough Trade / Blanco y Negro)
- 2004: Mary Chapin Carpenter - Between Here and Gone (Columbia)
- 2005: Amy Grant - Rock of Ages... Hymns and Faith (Word)
- 2005: Miranda Lambert - Kerosene (Epic)
- 2005: Rodney Crowell - The Outsider (Columbia)
- 2006: Eric Church - Sinners Like Me (Capitol Nashville)
- 2006: Vince Gill - These Days (MCA)
- 2006: Lee Hazlewood - Cake or Death (Ever)
- 2007: Miranda Lambert - Crazy Ex-Girlfriend (Sony Music)
- 2008: Eric Brace and Peter Cooper - You Don't Have to Like Them Both (Red Beet)
- 2008: Emmylou Harris - All I Intended to Be (Nonesuch)
- 2009: Miranda Lambert - Revolution (Columbia)

=== 2010 - present ===
- 2010: Allison Moorer - Crows (Rykodisc)
- 2011: Eric Brace and Peter Cooper - Master Session (Red Beet)
- 2011: Miranda Lambert - Four the Record (MCA)
- 2011: Vince Gill - Guitar Slinger (Hump)
- 2011: Matraca Berg - The Dreaming Fields (Dualtone)
- 2012: Pistol Annies - Hell on Heels (Columbia)
- 2012: Willie Nelson and Friends - Stars & Guitars (Lost Highway)
- 2013: Sheryl Crow - Feels Like Home (Old Green Barn / Sea Gayle Music / Warner Bros.)
- 2013: Ashley Monroe - Like a Rose (Warner Bros.)
- 2014: Miranda Lambert - Platinum (RCA)
- 2014: Beth Nielsen Chapman - Uncovered (BNC)
- 2014: Garth Brooks - Man Against Machine (RCA Nashville)
- 2014: Josh Thompson - Turn it Up (Show Dog)
- 2015: Dawes - All Your Favorite Bands (HUB)
- 2015: Amy Grant - Be Still and Know... Hymns & Faith (Universal)
- 2015: Ashley Monroe - The Blade (Warner Music Nashville)
- 2015: Spooner Oldham - Pot Luck (Light in the Attic)
- 2016: Paul Burch - Meridian Rising (Plowboy)]
- 2016: Mo Pitney - Behind This Guitar (Curb)
- 2016: Shawn Colvin and Steve Earle - Colvin and Earle (Fantasy)
- 2016: Vince Gill - Down to My Last Bad Habit (MCA Nashville / Universal)
- 2016: Darrell Scott - Couchville Sessions (Full Light)
- 2017: Rodney Crowell - Close Ties (New West)
- 2017: Steve Earle and the Dukes - So You Wannabe an Outlaw (Warner Bros.)
- 2017: Alison Krauss - Windy City (Capitol / Decca)
- 2018: Tom Rush - Voices (Appleseed)
