= Essential Steve Earle =

Greatest hits album by Steve Earle
- Released: March 2, 1993
- Genre: Country, Country rock
- Length: 46:13
- Label: MCA Records

Steve Earle chronology
Essential Steve Earle (1993)	Ain't Ever Satisfied: The Steve Earle Collection (1996)

Professional ratings
Review scores
Source	Rating
Allmusic	4.5/5 stars

Essential Steve Earle is the second compilation album by American singer-songwriter Steve Earle. The album was released in 1993.

== Track listing ==
All songs written by Steve Earle unless otherwise noted.

No.	Title	Writer(s)	Length
1.	"Guitar Town"		2:33
2.	"Hillbilly Highway"	Earle, Jimbeau Hinson	3:36
3.	"The Devil's Right Hand"		2:59
4.	"Goodbye's All We've Got Left"		3:16
5.	"Six Days on the Road"	Earl Green, Carl Montgomery	3:05
6.	"Someday"		3:46
7.	"Good Ol' Boy (Gettin' Tough)"	Richard Bennett, Earle	3:58
8.	"Copperhead Road"		4:28
9.	"The Rain Came Down"	Steve Earle, Michael Woody	4:11
10.	"I Ain't Ever Satisfied"		4:00
11.	"Nowhere Road"	Earle, Reno Kling	2:47
12.	"The Week of Living Dangerously"		4:26
13.	"Continental Trailways Blues"		3:08
