= Live from Austin, TX (Steve Earle album) =

Live From Austin, TX

Live album by Steve Earle
- Released: 2 November 2004
- Recorded: 12 September 1986
- Genres: Country, Country rock
- Label: New West
- Producers: Gary Briggs, Cameron Strang

Steve Earle chronology
Just an American Boy (2003)	Live From Austin, TX (2004)	Live at Montreux 2005 (2006)

Professional ratings
Review scores
Source	Rating
Allmusic	3.5/5 stars

Live From Austin, TX is a live album by Steve Earle, sourced from a concert originally recorded on 12 September 1986 for broadcast on the Austin City Limits television show. It was released by New West Records in 2004 as an album on CD and also a video on DVD, and reissued in 2017 as a combo with both versions. It was issued as a 2-LP vinyl set the same year.

== Track listing ==
All songs written by Steve Earle unless otherwise noted.

1. "Sweet Little '66" - 2:51
2. "Goodbye's All We Got Left" - 3:29
3. "Guitar Town" - 2:35
4. "Hillbilly Highway" - 3:32
5. "Good Ol Boy (Gettin' Tough)" - 4:05 (Earle, Richard Bennett)
6. "My Old Friend the Blues" - 3:00
7. "Think It Over" - 2:32 (Earle, Richard Bennett)
8. "Little Rock 'N' Roller" - 5:58
9. "State Trooper" - 5:06 (Bruce Springsteen)
10. "Nowhere Road" - 2:57 (Earle, Reno Kling)
11. "The Week of Living Dangerously" - 4:41
12. "Angry Young Man" - 4:29 (Earle, John Porter McMeans)
13. "Fearless Heart" - 4:06
14. "I Love You Too Much" - 3:49
15. "San Antonio Girl" - 3:00
16. "The Devil's Right Hand" - 3:08
17. "Down the Road" - 3:07 (Earle, Tony Brown, Jimbeau Hinson)

== Personnel ==
- Steve Earle - guitar, harmonica, vocals

The Dukes:

- Roland Kling - bass, keyboards
- Ken Moore - keyboards
- William Baxter - guitar, pedal steel guitar, mandolin
- Harold Stinson - drums
- Mike McAdam - Lead guitar
