= Ain't Ever Satisfied: The Steve Earle Collection =

Compilation album by Steve Earle
- Released: July 30, 1996
- Recorded: September 30, 1985 – October 6, 1990
- Genre: Country, Country rock
- Label: Hip-O

Steve Earle chronology
Essential Steve Earle (1993)	Ain't Ever Satisfied: The Steve Earle Collection (1996)	Angry Young Man: The Very Best Of Steve Earle (1999)

Professional ratings
Review scores
Source	Rating
Allmusic	4.5/5 stars

Ain't Ever Satisfied: The Steve Earle Collection is a compilation album by Steve Earle, drawn from his years with the MCA label. The album was released in July 1996.

== Track listing ==
All songs written by Steve Earle unless otherwise noted.

1. "Guitar Town"
2. "Good Ol' Boy (Gettin' Tough)" (Richard Bennett, Steve Earle)
3. "Hillbilly Highway" (Steve Earle, Jimbeau Hinson)
4. "My Old Friend the Blues"
5. "Fearless Heart"
6. "Think It Over" (Richard Bennett, Steve Earle)
7. "Someday"
8. "Goodbye's All We've Got Left"
9. "State Trooper" (live) (Bruce Springsteen)
10. "I Ain't Ever Satisfied"
11. "Nowhere Road" (Steve Earle, Reno Kling)
12. "The Rain Came Down" (Steve Earle, Michael Woody)
13. "I Love You Too Much"
14. "The Week of Living Dangerously"
15. "Continental Trailways Blues"
  - Featured in the 1987 film, Planes, Trains & Automobiles, but not included on the soundtrack album.
16. "Six Days on the Road" (Earl Green, Carl Montgomery)
  - Originally featured on the soundtrack album for Planes, Trains & Automobiles.
17. "Copperhead Road" – 4:32
18. "Snake Oil" – 3:30
19. "Even When I'm Blue" – 4:14
20. "Devil's Right Hand" – 3:04
21. "Nothing But a Child" – 4:25
22. "Johnny Come Lately" – 4:08
23. "Dead Flowers" (live) – 5:38 (Mick Jagger, Keith Richards)
24. "The Other Kind" – 5:11
25. "When the People Find Out" – 4:13
26. "Billy Austin" – 6:17
27. "She's About a Mover" (live) – 4:10 (Doug Sahm)
28. "West Nashville Boogie" (live) – 7:41
