= 20th Century Masters – The Millennium Collection: The Best of Steve Earle =

Greatest hits album by Steve Earle
- Released: August 19, 2003
- Recorded: September 30, 1985 – May 1988
- Genre: Country, Country rock
- Label: MCA Records

Steve Earle chronology
The Devil's Right Hand: An Introduction to Steve Earle (2001)	20th Century Masters – The Millennium Collection: The Best of Steve Earle (2003)

20th Century Masters – The Millennium Collection: The Best of Steve Earle is a compilation album by Steve Earle. The album was released on August 19, 2003.

== Critical reception ==
Professional ratings
Review scores
Source	Rating
AllMusic	3/5 stars

Chip O'Brien of PopMatters, in a review that also examined the driving force behind Best Of compilations, considered this album to be an attempt by MCA to "make a couple of bucks off the portion of his catalog they still had legal access to." Similarly William Ruhlmann of AllMusic said that this album "predictably treats Earle's career as if it lasted only from 1985-1988 and consisted only of his earlier MCA Records recordings."

== Track listing ==
All tracks are written by Steve Earle, except where noted.

No.	Title	Writer(s)	Length
1.	"Guitar Town"		2:34
2.	"Good Ol' Boy (Gettin' Tough)"	Richard Bennett, Steve Earle	3:59
3.	"Hillbilly Highway"	Steve Earle, Jimbeau Hinson	3:38
4.	"Someday"		3:48
5.	"Goodbye's All We've Got Left"		3:23
6.	"I Ain't Ever Satisfied"		3:53
7.	"Nowhere Road"	Steve Earle, Reno Kling	2:49
8.	"The Rain Came Down"	Steve Earle, Michael Woody	4:14
9.	"The Week of Living Dangerously"		4:27
10.	"Continental Trailways Blues"		3:09
11.	"Six Days on the Road"	Earl Green, Carl Montgomery	3:07
12.	"Copperhead Road"		4:30
