= Copperhead Road (song) =

Single by Steve Earle

from the album Copperhead Road
- Released: 1988
- Recorded: 1988
- Genre: Country rock; outlaw country; hard rock
- Length: 4:29
- Label: MCA
- Songwriter: Steve Earle
- Producers: Steve Earle; Tony Brown

Steve Earle singles chronology
"Sweet Little '66" (1987)	"Copperhead Road" (1988)	"Back to the Wall" (1988)

"Copperhead Road" is a song written and recorded by American singer-songwriter Steve Earle. It was released in 1988 as the first single and title track from his third studio album of the same name. The song reached number 10 on the U.S. Billboard Mainstream Rock Tracks chart, and was Earle's highest-peaking song to date on that chart in the United States. The song has sold 1.1 million digital copies in the United States as of September 2017. On April 20, 2023, the Tennessee General Assembly passed an act recognizing the song as the 11th official state song of the state of Tennessee.

== Content ==
The song's narrator is named John Lee Pettimore III, whose father and grandfather were both active in moonshine making and bootlegging in rural Johnson County, Tennessee. Pettimore's grandfather visited town only rarely, in order to buy supplies for a still he had set up in a holler along Copperhead Road. Pettimore's father hauled the moonshine to Knoxville each week in an old police cruiser he bought at a surplus auction. According to a family story, a revenue man once confronted John Sr. on Copperhead Road, intent on apprehending him for his moonshine activities, but never returned. John Jr. himself is killed in a fiery car crash on the same road while driving to Knoxville with a weekly shipment.

Pettimore enlists in the Army on his birthday, believing he will soon be drafted, and serves two tours of duty in Vietnam. Once he returns home, he decides to use the Copperhead Road land to grow marijuana, using seeds from Colombia and Mexico. He resolves not to be caught by the DEA using techniques learned from the Viet Cong.

"Copperhead Road" is composed in D Mixolydian, with a moderate tempo and main chord pattern of D-G-D.

== Influence and legacy ==
Copperhead Road was an actual road near Mountain City, Tennessee, in an area known to locals as "Big Dry Run" although it has since been renamed Copperhead Hollow Road, owing to theft of road signs bearing the song's name. The song inspired a popular line dance, and has been used as the theme music for the Discovery Channel reality series Moonshiners. In May 2024, a landmark consisting of a three-photograph panorama of Copperhead Road and a 1949 Dodge sedan painted as a mural were unveiled and are on display at Watauga Lake Winery, which is located nearby the song's namesake road.

The song's blend of country and Southern rock has influenced several artists, including Eric Church, Travis Tritt, Brothers Osborne, Chris Stapleton and Jason Aldean.

The song's lyrics inspired the 2018 novel Gods of Howl Mountain by Taylor Brown.

== Music video ==
The music video was directed by Tony Vanden Ende and premiered in early 1988.

== Chart performance ==
Chart (1988)	Peak position
Australia (ARIA)	23
Canada Top Singles (RPM)	12
UK Singles (The Official Charts Company)	45
US Billboard Mainstream Rock Tracks	10

Chart (2021)	Peak position
Canada Digital Song Sales (Billboard)	2
US Hot Rock & Alternative Songs (Billboard)	15
