= 1462 in France =

- Decades: 1440s; 1450s; 1460s; 1470s; 1480s
- See also: History of France; Timeline of French history; List of years in France

Events from the year 1462 in France.

== Incumbents ==
- Monarch – Louis XI

== Events ==
- Margaret of Anjou, the Queen of England went to France to try to gather support for the Lancastrians in the Wars of the Roses.
- On 9 May, by the Treaty of Bayonne, John II of Aragon ceded the counties of Roussillon and Cerdagne to King Louis XI in exchange for military aid valued at 200,000 shields to assist John against his subjects during the Catalan Civil War.
- Margaret of Anjou, the Queen of England, sailed to France at the invitation of King Louis XI, where she and Louis signed a secret agreement providing French military aid for the Lancastrian cause in the Wars of the Roses. She received some assistance, but Louis subsequently withdrew from the pact, fearing a Yorkist–Burgundian alliance directed against France.

== Births ==
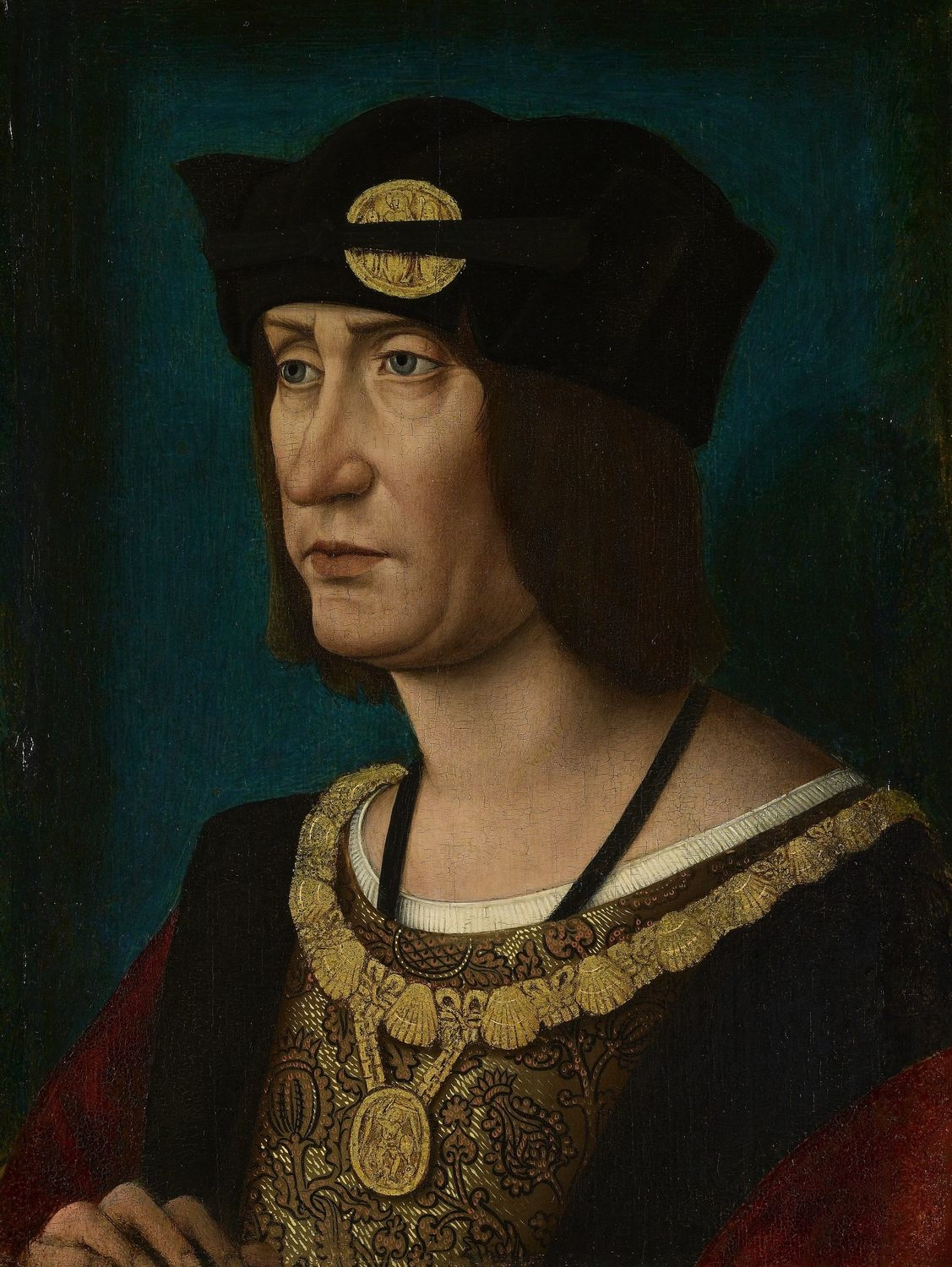
Louis XII, King of France 1498–1515

- 27 June – Louis XII (died 1515)

== Deaths ==
=== Full date missing ===
- 14 May – Jeanne de Bar, Countess of Marle and Soissons (born 1415)
- Bernard d'Armagnac, Count of Pardiac
- 20 March – Alain IX de Rohan (born 1382)
- 22 June – Catherine of Alençon, duchess (born before 1396)
- Nicolas Rolin, chancellor (born 1376)
