= Siege of Falaise =

Siege of Falaise may refer to:

- Siege of Falaise (1026), the siege of the town by Richard III, Duke of Normandy
- Siege of Falaise (1204), the siege and capture of the town by the French during the French annexation of Normandy
- Siege of Falaise (1419), the siege and capture of the town by the English during the Hundred Years' War
- Siege of Falaise (1450), the siege and capture of the town by the French during the Hundred Years' War
