= Live at Montreux 2005 =

Live album by Steve Earle
- Released: July 11, 2006
- Recorded: July 2005
- Genre: Country, Country rock
- Label: Eagle Records

Steve Earle chronology
Live From Austin, TX (2004)	Live at Montreux 2005 (2006)

Professional ratings
Review scores
Source	Rating
Allmusic	3.5/5 stars

Live at Montreux 2005 is a live album by Steve Earle. The album was recorded in July 2005 and released on July 11, 2006.

== Track listing ==
All songs written by Steve Earle unless otherwise noted.

1. "Jerusalem" - 4:29
2. "What's a Simple Man to Do" - 3:32
3. "The Devil's Right Hand" - 2:45
4. "Warrior" - 3:22
5. "Rich Man's War" - 3:49
6. "South Nashville Blues" - 2:52
7. "CCKMP" - 4:14
8. "Dixieland" - 3:48
9. "Ellis Unit One" - 4:40
10. "Condi Condi" - 3:31
11. "The Mountain" - 5:12
12. "The Revolution Starts Now" - 4:02
13. "Copperhead Road" - 4:30
14. "Christmas in Washington" - 5:36
