= The Devil's Right Hand: An Introduction to Steve Earle =

Compilation album by Steve Earle
- Released: May 8, 2001
- Genre: Country, country rock
- Label: Universal International

Steve Earle chronology
Angry Young Man: The Very Best of Steve Earle (1999)	The Devil's Right Hand: An Introduction to Steve Earle (2001)	20th Century Masters - The Millennium Collection: The Best of Steve Earle (2003)

Professional ratings
Review scores
Source	Rating
Allmusic	3/5 stars

The Devil's Right Hand: An Introduction to Steve Earle is a compilation album by Steve Earle. The album was released on May 8, 2001.

== Track listing ==
All songs written by Steve Earle unless otherwise noted.

1. "My Old Friend the Blues" - 3:10
2. "Fearless Heart" - 4:08
3. "Little Rock 'n' Roller" - 4:51
4. "Someday" - 3:49
5. "Little Sister" - 3:16 (Greg Trooper)
6. "Sweet Little '66" - 2:40
7. "San Antonio Girl" - 3:06
8. "The Rain Came Down" - 4:09 (Steve Earle, Michael Woody)
9. "The Devil's Right Hand" - 3:01
10. "Even When I'm Blue" - 4:14
11. "You Belong to Me" - 4:23
12. "The Other Kind" - 5:32
13. "Hopeless Romantics" - 2:45
14. "Billy Austin" - 6:16
15. "Regular Guy" - 3:18
16. "Close Your Eyes" - 4:45
17. "She's About a Mover" (live) - 4:10 (Doug Sahm)
18. "Dead Flowers" (live) - 8:18 (Mick Jagger, Keith Richards)
