= 1471 in France =

- Decades: 1450s; 1460s; 1470s; 1480s; 1490s
- See also: History of France; Timeline of French history; List of years in France

Events from the year 1471 in France.

== Incumbents ==
- Monarch – King Louis XI

== Events ==
- January 4 – Charles the Bold, Duke of Burgundy agrees to help Edward IV regain the throne of England from King Henry VI.
- February – King Louis XI wages war in and around the town of Gamaches.
- Date unknown – Following the death of his father, Alain of Albret becomes the head of the House of Albret.
- Date unknown – Guillaume Fichet's Rhetorica becomes the first rhetoric to be published and printed in France.
- Date unknown – The Clos Lucé Palace is built by Hugues d'Amboise
- Date unknown – Pierre II de Virey becomes abbot of Clairvaux Abbey, succeeding Philippe II de Fontaines.

== Births ==
- Date unknown – Symphorien Champier, doctor and writer from Lyon

== Deaths ==
- December 17 – Isabella of Portugal, Duchess of Burgundy (born 1397) in Aire-sur-la-Lys
- Date unknown – Charles II d'Albret, magnate and soldier
