= BBC Radio 1 Live in Concert (Steve Earle album) =

Live album by Steve Earle
- Released: 11 December 1992
- Recorded: 29 November 1988 at The Town & Country Club, London
- Genre: Country, Country rock
- Length: 52:45
- Label: Windsong International
- Producer: Pete Ritzema

Steve Earle chronology
BBC Radio 1 Live in Concert (1992)	Shut Up And Die Like An Aviator (1991)

BBC Radio 1 Live in Concert is a live album by Steve Earle. The album was recorded 29 November 1988 at The Town & Country Club, London and released in 1992. The album was re-released as Live At The BBC in 2009 with an additional four tracks recorded for Liz Kershaw's show, recorded live in Manchester on 16 April 1987.

Professional ratings
Review scores
Source	Rating
Allmusic	2/5 stars

== Track listing ==
All songs written by Steve Earle unless otherwise noted.

1. "Copperhead Road" - 4:25
2. "San Antonio Girl" - 2:45
3. "Even When I'm Blue" - 4:00
4. "My Old Friend the Blues" - 2:50
5. "Someday" - 3:45
6. "The Devil's Right Hand" - 2:55
7. "Down the Road" - 3:05 (Tony Brown, Steve Earle, Jimbeau Hinson)
8. "Snake Oil" - 7:45
9. "Johnny Come Lately" - 3:20
10. "When Will We Be Married?" - 4:10 (Traditional)
11. "Little Rock & Roller" - 4:45
12. "Dead Flowers" - 5:35 (Mick Jagger, Keith Richards)
13. "My Baby Worships Me" - 3:25

2009 Edition (released as Live at the BBC) Bonus Tracks:

- 14. "Fearless Heart" - 4:05
- 15. "Good Ole Boy (Getting Tough)" - 3:57
- 16. "Hillbilly Highway" (Steve Earle, Jimbeau Hinson) - 3:39
- 17. "I Love You Too Much" - 4:06
