= West Virginia coal wars =

Armed labor conflicts (1912–1921)

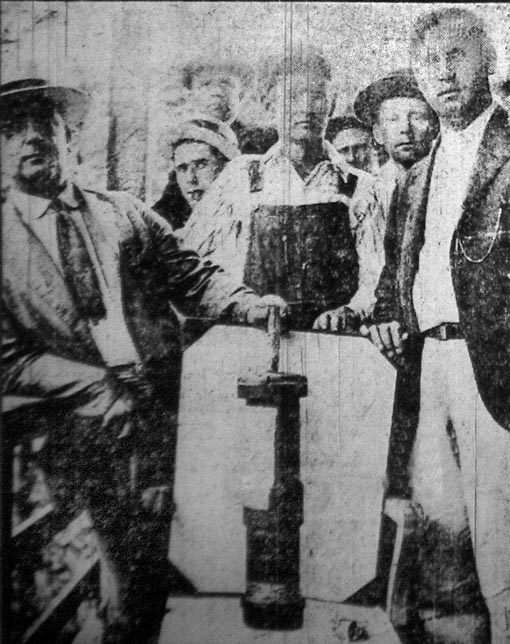
- Coal miners displaying a bomb that was dropped during the Battle of Blair Mountain in 1921
- Date: 1912–1921
- Location: West Virginia, United States
- Also known as: Mine wars
- Participants: Coal company security/detectives, West Virginia state and military forces, U.S. Army and U.S. Army Air Service forces against striking miners
- Outcome: Law enforcement-military victory; Bill Blizzard acquitted of treason; other miners jailed for murder charges and other offenses; mining union membership decreased by 50% from 1921 to 1924

The West Virginia coal wars (1912–1921), also known as the mine wars, arose out of a dispute between coal companies and miners.

The West Virginia mine wars era began with the Cabin Creek and Paint Creek strike of 1912–1913. With help from Mary "Mother Jones" Harris Jones, an important figure in unionizing the mine workers, the miners demanded better pay, better work conditions, the right to trade where they pleased (ending the practice of forcing miners to buy from company-owned stores), and recognition of the United Mine Workers (UMW).

The mining companies refused to meet the demands of the workers and instead hired Baldwin-Felts agents equipped with rifles to guard the mines and act as strikebreakers. After the Agents arrived, the miners either moved out or were evicted from the houses they had been renting from the coal companies, and moved into coal camps that were being supported by the Union. Approximately 35,000 people lived in these coal camps.

A month after the strike began, hostilities began with the arrival of the Baldwin-Felts Agents who provoked the miners. Socialist Party activists began supplying miners with weapons: 6 machine guns, 1,000 rifles, and 50,000 rounds of ammunition.

On September 1, 1912, approximately 6,000 unionized miners from across the Kanawha River crossed the river and declared their intent to kill the mine guards and destroy the company operations. Due to this threat, the mining companies deployed additional armed guards and awaited the miners' attack. Consequently, the Governor proclaimed martial law to be in effect on September 2, 1912, seizing 1,872 rifles, 556 pistols, 6 machine guns, 225,000 rounds of ammunition, and 480 blackjacks – as well as large quantities of daggers, bayonets, and brass knuckles.

On May 19, 1920, a shootout in Matewan, West Virginia, between agents of the Baldwin-Felts and local miners, who later joined the United Mine Workers of America, sparked what became known as the Battle of Blair Mountain, the largest insurrection in the United States since the American Civil War.

== Background ==
=== Coal mining in West Virginia ===
West Virginia had only a few active coal mines during the US Civil War, with fewer than 1,600 miners in the whole state. Coal mining would flourish, however, between 1880 and 1900, after competing railroad companies began carving routes through the mountains of Appalachia. West Virginia produced 489,000 tons of coal in 1869, 4,882,000 tons of coal in 1889, and 89,384,000 tons of coal in 1917. The quick expansion of mining in West Virginia prompted many mining companies to construct company towns, in which mining companies own many, if not all housing, amenities, and public services. Miners were often paid in "coal scrip", paper notes issued by mining companies that could only be redeemed at company-owned stores in company towns.

Mining is a dangerous profession overall, but between 1890 and 1912, West Virginia mines had the highest miner death rates in the country. During World War I, West Virginia miners faced higher death rates than even soldiers in the American Expeditionary Force fighting in Europe.

==== Mining unions in West Virginia ====
Some West Virginian coal miners joined the United Mine Workers (UMW) in response to wage reductions following The Panic of 1893. By 1902, UMW membership in West Virginia had reached 5,000 miners. Union membership among West Virginia coal miners remained low, however, especially in southern parts of the state. Striking gained momentum as a tactic with the 1897 Coal Miner's Strike, which included mines in northern West Virginia's Pittsburgh seam. The 1902 New River Coal Strike in Raleigh and Fayette Counties continued momentum into southern West Virginia, and foreshadowed the coming violence with its concluding massacre known as the "Battle of Stanaford".

== Cabin Creek and Paint Creek strikes: 1912–1913 ==
UMW had a strong, if isolated, presence in the Paint Creek area, and most miners there were unionized. In March 1912, Paint Creek UMW miners attempted to renegotiate their contracts for higher pay and automatic union dues. In response, a number of Paint Creek mines withdrew their recognition of UMW.

On April 18, 1912, union and non-union miners from Paint Creek, as well as 7,500 miners from the previously non-union Cabin Creek, Kanawha, and Fayette counties, went on strike. The UMW set up tent camps for miners and their families who had often been evicted without warning. UMW Vice-President Frank Hayes and the well-known labor activist Mary "Mother" Jones even visited the state to pledge their support.

Mining companies in the Paint Creek area hired strikebreakers and armed guards to suppress the strike, including 300 agents from the Baldwin-Felts Detective Agency. Striking miners and their families were prohibited from using company bridges and roads, as well as utilities like running water. Company guards killed several miners over the first few months of the strike, and constructed a machine gun equipped armored train known as the "Bull Moose Express", which they used to fire upon the tent camps of striking workers, killing miner Cesco Estep. Miners, with the support of Mother Jones and the Socialist Party of America, acquired weapons and retaliated against the mining company guards.

In September, 1912, West Virginia Governor William E. Glasscock declared martial law and sent 1,200 state troops to confiscate weapons and ammunition attempted to quell the rising tensions between miners and mining companies. The declaration of martial law reduced armed conflict in the winter of 1912–1913.

In April, 1913, UMW officials presented the Paint Creek mining companies with a compromise deal, leaving out some miner demands but maintaining support for a 9-hour workday, accountability for miner compensation, and protection from backlash for union membership. After nearly a full year of work stoppages and fighting, the mining companies accepted the UMW compromise, which was enforced by West Virginia state soldiers.

== 1920–1922 ==
=== The Battle of Matewan ===
On April 22 and 23, 1920, between 275 and 300 miners in Matewan, Mingo County joined the United Mine Workers of America. In retaliation, the Burnwell Coal and Coke Company fired all union-aligned miners and gave them three days to leave their company-owned residences. On April 27, 1920, Mingo County officials arrested Baldwin-Felts agent Albert C. Felts, who would later be involved in the Matewan shootout, for illegally evicting miners of the Burnwell Coal and Coke Company as punishment for union activity. Mingo County Sheriff G. T. Blankenship negotiated with miners groups that as long as only Mingo County officials enforced the eviction notices, the miners would peacefully comply. Miners in Mingo County continued to join the UMWA. On May 6, 1920, a United Mine Workers meeting drew 3,000 attendees. By May 17, 1920, the UMWA set up a tent colony for evicted miners outside of Matewan.

On May 19, 1920, thirteen agents of the Baldwin-Felts Detective Agency returned to Matewan to evict miners from Stone Mountain Coal Corporation housing. The Baldwin-Felts agents were challenged by Matewan Police Chief Sid Hatfield and Matewan Mayor Cabel Testerman, who contested the agents' authority in the town. The Baldwin-Felts agents persisted, however, based on permission from a local justice of the peace. Baldwin-Felts agents carried out their evictions under watch of a crowd of miners and their families. Hearing of the trouble stirring in Matewan, miners from surrounding areas armed themselves and made their way to the town in case of a larger conflict.

As the Baldwin-Felts agents were headed to the train station to depart Matewan, they were confronted once more by Police Chief Sid Hatfield and Mayor Cabel Testerman. Both Hatfield and Baldwin-Felts agent Albert Felts reported that they had warrants for the others arrest.

Accounts of the May 19th shootout itself differ. Some reports indicate that Baldwin-Felts agents attempted to arrest Sid Hatfield, and shot Mayor Testermen when he intervened on Hatfield's behalf. Others indicate that Hatfield initiated the violence, either by firing himself or by signalling a prepared ambush. In either case, the shootout resulted in ten dead: Mayor Testerman, two miners, and seven Baldwin-Felts agents, including Baldwin-Felts Agency Chief Thomas Felts' younger brothers, Albert and Lee.

=== After the Battle of Matewan ===
Support for unionization in Mingo County increased after the Matewan Shootout. By July 1, 1920, miners in the county had unionized and joined the UMW strike. Miners and mine guards engaged in several armed skirmishes over the closure of coal mines and access to rail routes in the summer and fall of 1920. The West Virginia government declared martial law and sent federal troops to quell the strike, but backed down under threat of a general strike of all union coal miners in West Virginia.

Baldwin-Felts Agency Chief Thomas Felts hired a team of lawyers to prosecute a case against Sid Hatfield and fifteen other men alleged to have participated in the Matewan Shootout, specifically on the charge of murdering Albert Felts. All sixteen men were, however, acquitted by a Mingo County jury. Shortly thereafter, the West Virginia Legislature passed a bill allowing criminal cases to be prosecuted with juries summoned from another county. Murder charges were renewed, only this time for the deaths of the other 6 Baldwin-Felts agents.

Sid Hatfield and his deputy Ed Chambers were also brought up on charges of destroying the Mohawk mining camp in McDowell County. On August 1, 1921, Hatfield, Chambers, and their wives traveled unarmed to the McDowell County courthouse to stand trial. Upon reaching the courthouse, Hatfield and Chambers were shot and killed by waiting Baldwin-Felts agents. Miners in West Virginia were outraged at the deaths of Sid Hatfield and Ed Chambers. In the weeks following the August 1st assassinations, miners organized and armed themselves across West Virginia.

=== Battle of Blair Mountain ===
From August 20, 1921, miners began rallying at Lens Creek, approximately ten miles south of West Virginia state capital of Charleston. Estimates of total numbers vary, but on August 24, between 5,000 and 20,000 miners began marching from Lens Creek into Logan County, West Virginia. Many of the miners were armed, and some acquired weapons and ammunition from the towns along the march's path.

Logan County Sheriff Don Chafin had assembled a fighting force of approximately 2,000 county police, state police, state militia, and Baldwin-Felts agents to stop the approaching miners in the mountain range surrounding Logan County. On August 25, the miners began arriving in the mountains surrounding Logan, and fighting began between the two forces. Though Sheriff Chafin commanded fewer men, they were equipped with machine guns and rented aircraft, from which they dropped rudimentary bombs on the attacking miners.

On August 30, 1921, President Warren G. Harding threatened to declare martial law in counties in West Virginia affected by the violence if the armed bands of miners did not disperse by noon on September 1. A proclamation to declare martial law in the West Virginia counties of Fayette, Kanawha, Logan, Boone and Mingo was prepared and signed by the President Warren G. Harding, awaiting his order for it to be promulgated. and troops of the 19th and 26th U.S. Infantry regiments were readied at Camp Sherman in Ohio and Camp Dix in New Jersey, respectively, to be sent by railroad to West Virginia.

The union leaders ignored the order and 2,500 federal troops arrived on September 2, bringing with them machine guns and military aircraft armed with surplus explosive and gas bombs from the recently concluded World War I. Facing a large and well equipped fighting force, the miners were forced to stand down.

Though the battle ended in clear defeat for the pro-union miners, they gained some press support in the following years. Approximately 550 miners and labor activists were convicted of murder, insurrection, and treason for their participation in the march from Lens Creek to Logan County and the ensuing Battle of Blair Mountain. Press support did not extend to union growth; UMW membership in West Virginia dropped by about half between 1921 and 1924.

== Legacy ==
The Matewan shootout is re-enacted annually in Matewan, West Virginia.

John Sayles dramatized the events of the Matewan shootout in his 1987 film Matewan. It is dramatized in the 2024 novel Rednecks by Taylor Brown.

A documentary named The Mine Wars was made about these events for PBS and was originally aired on the network January 26, 2016. Narrated by actor Michael Murphy, it used archival material and interviews to convey the story as part of their ongoing American Experience series.

The West Virginia Mine Wars Museum, located in downtown Matewan, offers artifacts and interpretations of the events. The building that houses the museum still bears the scars of bullet holes from the Matewan Massacre.

== See also ==
- UMW General coal strike (1922)
- Paint Creek–Cabin Creek strike of 1912
- Colorado Coalfield War – 1913–1914 labor uprising in Colorado, US
