= 1450 in France =

- Decades: 1430s; 1440s; 1450s; 1460s; 1470s
- See also: History of France; Timeline of French history; List of years in France

Events from the year 1450 in France.

== Incumbents ==
- Monarch – Charles VII

== Events ==
- March – French forces besiege the English under Duke of Somerset at Caen as part of the Hundred Years War
- March 22 – French take Fresnay
- April 15 – The Battle of Formigny is fought as part of the Hundred Years War.
- June 5 – Siege of Caen begins
- July 6 –
  - Caen surrenders to the French
  - Siege of Cherbourg begins
  - Siege of Falaise begins
- July 21 – Siege of Falaise ends, French victory
- August 12 – Cherbourg-en-Cotentin, the last remaining English stronghold in Normandy, surrenders to the French ending the Siege of Cherbourg
- October – French invasion of Guyenne begins with the siege of Jonsac.

== Deaths ==
- February 9 – Agnès Sorel, royal mistress (b.1422)
- September 16 – Louis Aleman, cardinal (b.1390)
