= Someday (Steve Earle song) =

Single by Steve Earle

from the album Guitar Town
- B-side: "Hillbilly Highway"
- Released: October 25, 1986
- Length: 3:46
- Label: MCA
- Songwriter(s): Steve Earle
- Producer(s): Emory Gordy Jr., Tony Brown

Steve Earle singles chronology
"Guitar Town" (1986)	"Someday" (1986)	"Goodbye's All We've Got Left" (1987)

"Someday" is a song written and recorded by American singer-songwriter Steve Earle. It was released in October 1986 as the third single from the album Guitar Town. The song reached #28 on the Billboard Hot Country Singles & Tracks chart. The song features in the 2007 film Bridge to Terabithia.

== Chart performance ==
Chart (1986)	Peak position
US Hot Country Songs (Billboard)	28
Canadian RPM Country Tracks	31
