= 1460 in France =

- Decades: 1440s; 1450s; 1460s; 1470s; 1480s
- See also: History of France; Timeline of French history; List of years in France

Events from the year 1460 in France.

== Incumbents ==
- Monarch – Charles VII

== Events ==
- 4 April - The University of Nantes is founded
- Unknown - The Collège Sainte-Barbe is established in Paris

== Births ==
- 29 September - Louis II de la Trémoille, soldier (died 1525)
