= Gods of Howl Mountain =

2018 novel by Taylor Brown

- Author: Taylor Brown
- Genre: Fiction
- Published: 2018

Gods of Howl Mountain is a 2018 novel by Taylor Brown.

== Plot summary ==
The novel centers on the Docherty family of Howl Mountain, North Carolina during the 1950s. Family matriarch Maybelline Docherty was widowed during the Great War, and her daughter Bonni was later traumatized by a mysterious event that caused her to be committed to a mental hospital. Bonni's son, himself a Korean War veteran, works as a bootlegger while his grandmother Maybelline seeks justice for the harm that has been done to their family.

== Background ==
The book was inspired by Blowing Rock, North Carolina in the Blue Mountains, and the song "Copperhead Road" by Steve Earle.

== Reception ==
A review from the News & Record praised the book for including "the context of the hard times that drove people to bootlegging, and the cultural conflicts that arose when mills were built, streams were dammed, wars took young men away from home, and feds tried to enforce the laws." Library Journal wrote that "Not to be missed, this bold, dark, gritty novel is another coup for Brown, whose lyrical descriptions of the landscape only add to the captivating story of indomitable but isolated folks bound by folklore, tradition, and a hardscrabble life." A review from the Historical Novel Society praised the author's "ability to weave a story of a dark family history and retribution with the relentless mountainous backdrop make this a compelling read." Publishers Weekly wrote "Brown’s lyrical prose invokes a verdant landscape whose rich past is woven into its roots and people; their dependence on the land and respect for its great mysteries are palpable."
