= Themes from a Rainy Decade =

Themes From A Rainy Decade

Studio album by Richard Bennett
- Released: 2004
- Studio: Tone Chaparral Studio (Nashville, TN)
- Genre: Rock
- Label: Moderne Shellac
- Producer: Richard Bennett

Richard Bennett chronology
| Themes From A Rainy Decade (2004) | Code Red Cloud Nine (2008) |

Professional ratings
Review scores
| Source | Rating |
|---|---|
| CD Baby | not rated |

Themes From A Rainy Decade is the first solo album released by Richard Bennett after decades of work as a studio musician and producer, contributing to thousands of recordings for other artists.

In the liner notes to the CD, Mark Knopfler writes: "For almost ten years now I've felt very lucky having Richard Bennett as a pal and as a member of the band. His quiet, self-effacing manner hides an encyclopaedic knowledge of all kinds of roots and rock music, from Hillbilly to Hawaiian, played effortlessly on a variety of instruments which appear out of a flight case as big as an Airstream trailer...... May his cracking guitar playing find a place in your life as it has in mine."

== Track listing ==
All tracks composed by Richard Bennett

1. "Riviera"
2. "Autumn's Affair"
3. "Ashes"
4. "The Proud and Profane
5. "Dinamico"
6. "Aquanetta"
7. "The Flaming Palomino"
8. "Blue at Best"
9. "Hawkins Street"
10. "Underworld"
11. "A Face No More"
12. "Castaway"

== Personnel ==
- Bass - Glenn Worf, George Bradfute, Garry Tallent
- Drums - Chad Cromwell, Phil Lee, Craig Wright
- Keyboards - Dave Hoffner, Reese Wynans
- Vibes - Paul Burch
- Guitars - George Bradfute, Al Casey, Richard Bennett
- Solo Guitar - Richard Bennett

== Recording ==
- Produced by Richard Bennett
- Recorded and mixed by George Bradfute at Tone Chaparral
- Mastered by Jonathan Russell
- Edited by Eric Conn at Georgetown Masters
- Album Designed by Linsey Sieger, phots by Nick Bennett
- All songs written by Richard Bennett, Moderne Shellac Music
