= 1467 in France =

- Decades: 1440s; 1450s; 1460s; 1470s; 1480s
- See also: History of France; Timeline of French history; List of years in France

Events from the year 1467 in France.

== Incumbents ==
- Monarch – Louis XI

== Events ==
- 15 June – Philip the Good is succeeded as Duke of Burgundy, by Charles the Bold.

== Births ==
- Philip of Cleves, bishop (d. 1505)
- Guillaume Budé, scholar (d. 1540)
- Philippa of Guelders, Noblewoman (d.1547)

== Deaths ==
- 15 June –Philip the Good, Duke of Burgundy (b.1396)

=== Date Unknown ===
- John, Count of Angoulême, nobleman (b.1399)

== Links ==
Media related to 1467 in France at Wikimedia Commons
