= Rednecks (novel) =

2024 book

- Author: Taylor Brown
- Genre: Historical fiction
- Published: 2024
- Publisher: St. Martin's Press

Rednecks is a 2024 historical fiction novel by Taylor Brown based on the West Virginia coal wars.

== Plot summary ==
The novel focuses on the camp doctor "Doc Moo" Muhanna, Frank Hugham, an African-American World War I veteran and coal miner, and Frank's grandmother Beulah. It opens with the Battle of Matewan, a major inflection point in the West Virginia coal wars.

== Reception ==
Gabino Iglesias called it "a superb historical drama full of violence and larger-than-life characters that chronicles the events of 1920 and 1921 as it explores the people and reasons behind the largest labor uprising in American history." In Plateau Magazine, Marianne Leek wrote that "it’s Brown’s richly drawn imagined characters that add a layer of poetic beauty and complexity to this novel." It won the 2025 Southern Book Prize.
