= Fallen Land =

2016 book

- Author: Taylor Brown
- Genre: Historical fiction
- Published: 2016

Fallen Land is a 2016 historical fiction novel by Taylor Brown. It is Brown's debut novel.

== Plot summary ==
Callum, a teenage Irish refugee who became a Confederate scout in the American Civil War, turns on his fellow soldiers to prevent them from raping a teenaged farmgirl.

== Reception ==
The book received positive reviews from critics. Kirkus Reviews called it "n epic saga of endurance and sacrifice rendered in a voice wholly Southern in dialect, rhythm, and reference". Justin Lindsay of the Historical Novel Society wrote that "Despite the fact that this is Taylor Brown’s debut novel, the sophistication and maturity of the writing speak to the talents of an experienced writer. Though the pacing is halting at times, the narrative is compelling, and the prose is both evocative and literary in feel". Lisa J. Yarde in Washington Independent Review of Books, wrote that "For a first-time novelist, the author demonstrates mastery of the ability to immerse readers in a setting and period."
