= Lancastria (disambiguation) =

The RMS Lancastria was a British navy ship sunk in 1940 with the loss of about 4000 lives.

Lancastria may also refer to:

- Lancastria, a British Rail Class 40 diesel locomotive D223
- A paleozoic fossil of Pennsylvania

== See also ==
- Lancashire, a British county and former duchy
- Lancastrian (disambiguation)
