= 1464 in France =

- Decades: 1440s; 1450s; 1460s; 1470s; 1480s
- See also: History of France; Timeline of French history; List of years in France

Events from the year 1464 in France.

== Incumbents ==
- Monarch – Louis XI

== Events ==
- Unknown - Catholicon the first French dictionary is compiled by Jehan Lagadeuc

== Births ==
- Philippe Villiers de L'Isle-Adam, soldier (died 1534)
