= Moontoast =

Moontoast was a social media advertising platform that assisted brands in audience engagement across various devices. Moontoast's headquarters were in Boston, Massachusetts, with offices in Nashville, Tennessee, and San Francisco, California. Moontoast is no longer operational.

== History ==
Moontoast was co-founded by Joe Glaser, Marcus Whitney, a former partner at Emma, and pedal steel guitarist Bucky Baxter.

The company launched at SXSW in 2008 and added their social media platform in September 2010.

In 2013, Toyota and Moontoast created an Instagram gallery which played 15-second Instagram videos within a swipe-able video gallery.

The company worked with Lexus to show the 2014 Lexus IS live from the Detroit Auto Show.

In October 2014, Moontoast changed its name to Spendsetter after buying loyalty rewards company Spendship. Co-founder Marcus Whitney announced that he was leaving his CTO position in the company and would be replaced by Spendship founder, Jason Weaver.

The company was funded by music industry angel investors.
