= 1453 in France =

- Decades: 1430s; 1440s; 1450s; 1460s; 1470s
- See also: History of France; Timeline of French history; List of years in France

Events from the year 1453 in France.

== Incumbents ==
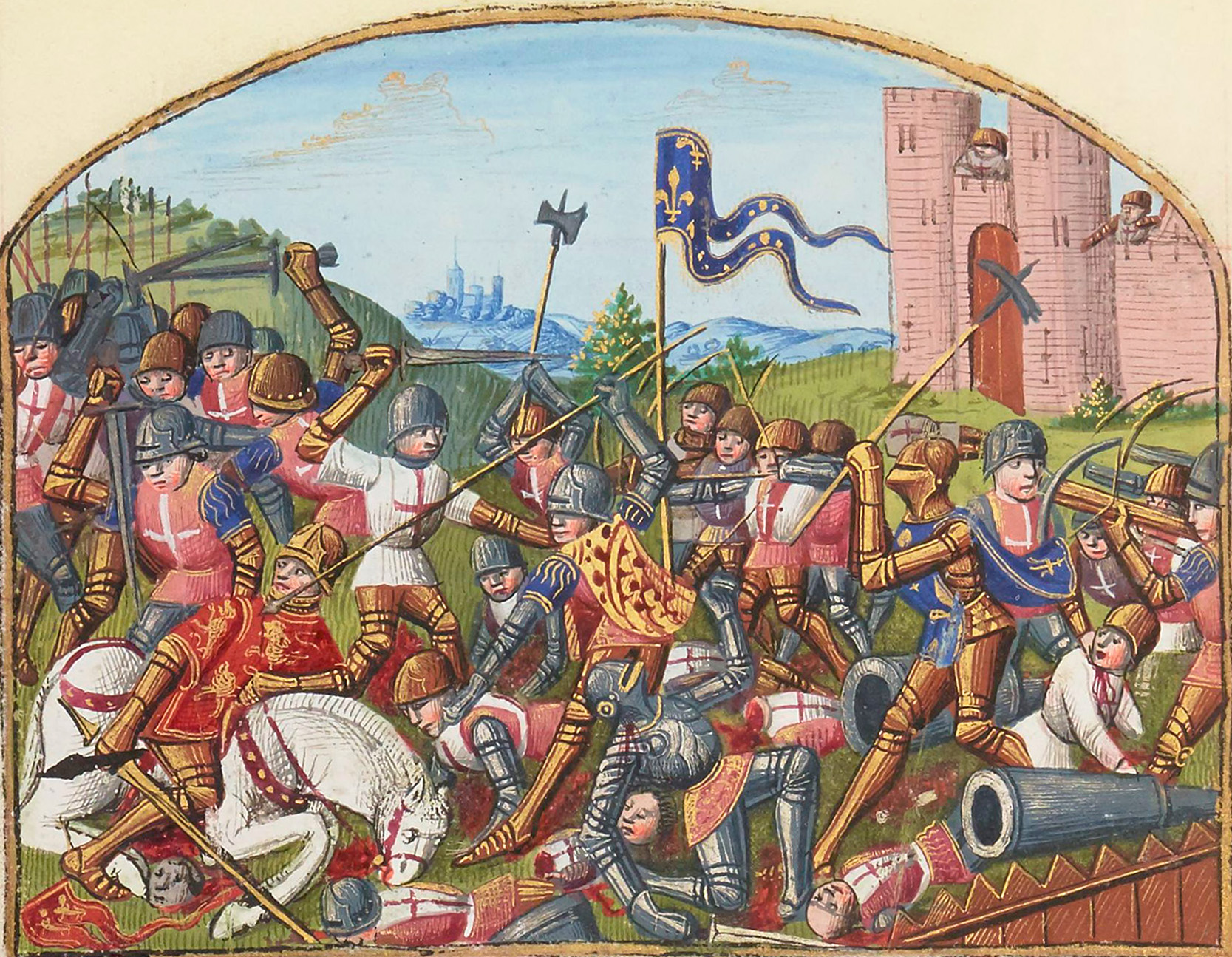
Painting depicting the Battle of Castillon

- Monarch – Charles VII

== Events ==
- Ongoing since 1449 – The Revolt of Ghent, lasted from 1449 to 1453.
- 17 July – The Battle of Castillon in Gascony. A decisive French victory, it is considered to mark the end the Hundred Years' War.

== Deaths ==
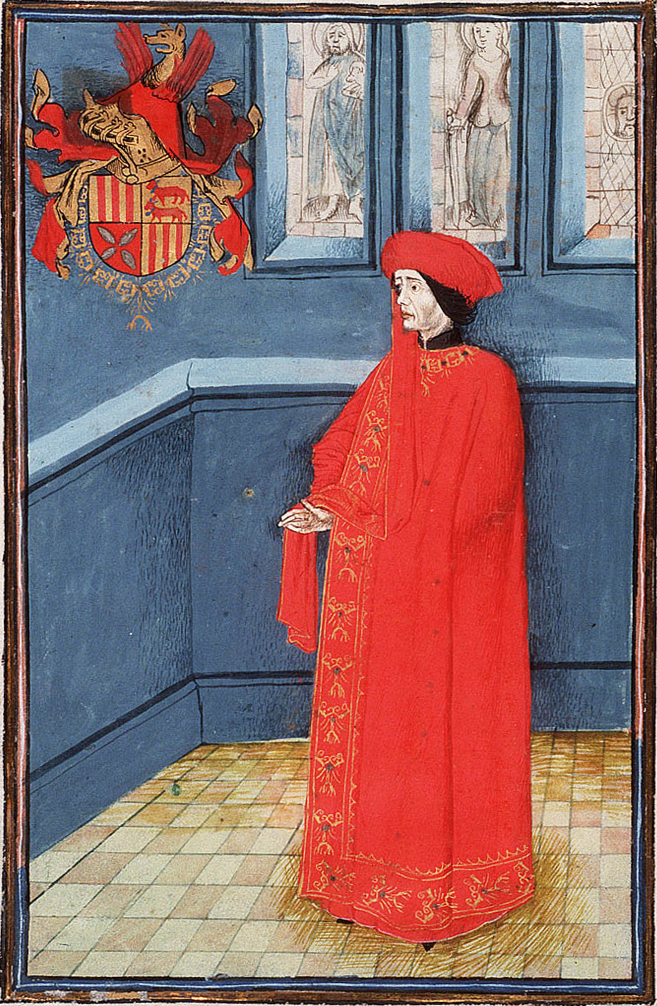
Mathieu de Foix-Comminges

- 28 February – Isabella, Duchess of Lorraine. (b.1400)
- 17 July – John Talbot, 1st Earl of Shrewsbury (born c. 1387) was killed during the Battle of Castillon.
- Unknown – Mathieu de Foix-Comminges, Count of Comminges between 1419 and 1443
