= 1459 in France =

- Decades: 1430s; 1440s; 1450s; 1460s; 1470s
- See also: History of France; Timeline of French history; List of years in France

Events from the year 1459 in France.

== Incumbents ==
- Monarch – Charles VII

== Death ==
- Unknown – Jacques Morel, sculptor (born 1395)
