= 1457 in France =

- Decades: 1430s; 1440s; 1450s; 1460s; 1470s
- See also: History of France; Timeline of French history; List of years in France

Events from the year 1457 in France.

== Incumbents ==
- Monarch – Charles VII

== Births ==
=== Date Unknown ===
- Marie of Orléans, Countess of Étampes and Viscountess of Narbonne.(d.1493)

== Deaths ==
- 22 September – Peter II, Duke of Brittany
