= Pride of Eden =

2020 book

- Author: Taylor Brown
- Genre: Fiction
- Published: 2020

Pride of Eden is a 2020 novel by Taylor Brown.

== Plot summary ==
Anse Caulfield, a Vietnam War veteran, runs the Little Eden wildlife refuge on the Georgia coast.

== Reception ==
It received mostly positive reviews from critics. Walter Biggins in The Atlanta Journal-Constitution, described it as "apocalyptic in its imagination, biblical in its searing vision." In the News & Record, Linda Brinson wrote that the novel "takes Brown to a new level. It’s not exactly more restrained or refined, but somehow everything works together a bit more smoothly to create a haunting story. There are tales of war, and trophy hunting and poaching, of violence and cruelty, but also stories of love for wildlife and the environment, of friendship, and of indomitable spirits, animal as well as human." C.F. Foster in the Jacksonville Florida Times-Union wrote that "Despite the jumps the story moves fast and readable although at times it becomes very bloody, especially the war scenes."
