= 1461 in France =

- Decades: 1440s; 1450s; 1460s; 1470s; 1480s
- See also: History of France; Timeline of French history; List of years in France

Events from the year 1461 in France.

== Incumbents ==
- Monarch – Charles VII (until July 22), then Louis XI

== Events ==
October – Louis XI abolishes the Pragmatic Sanction for the first time.

== Births ==
- 3 April – Anne of France (died 14 November 1522)
- 28 December – Louise of Savoy (nun) (died 24 July 1503)

== Deaths ==
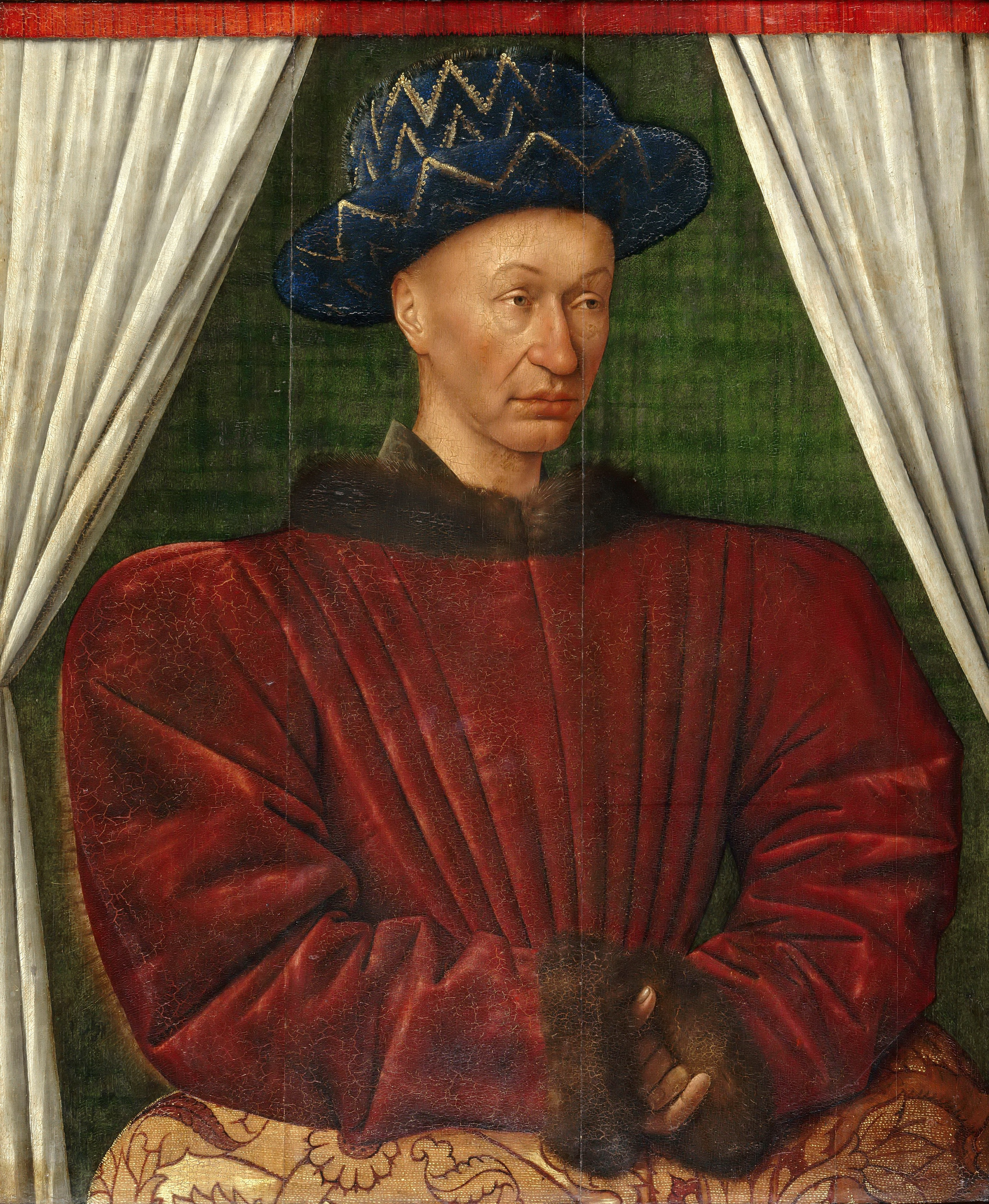
Charles VII, King of France 1422–1461

- 22 July – Charles VII of France (born 1403).

=== Full date missing ===
- Jean Poton de Xaintrailles, noble (born 1390?)
- Martin le Franc, poet (born c.1410)
