= 1451 in France =

- Decades: 1430s; 1440s; 1450s; 1460s; 1470s
- See also: History of France; Timeline of French history; List of years in France

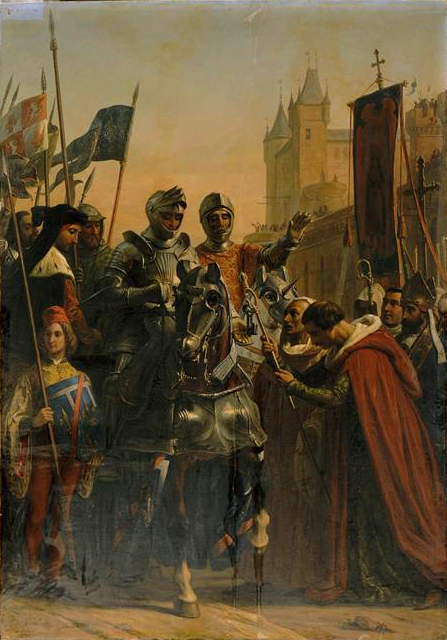
The Count of Dunois receiving keys from the jurors of Bordeaux, June 23, 1451, painted by Auguste Vinchon

Events from the year 1451 in France.

== Incumbents ==
- Monarch – Charles VII

== Events ==
- 14 February – The future Louis XI marries Charlotte of Savoy .
- 30 June – French forces capture Bordeaux.
- 20 August – French forces take Bayonne the last remaining English stronghold in the region.

== Births ==
=== Date Unknown ===
- René II, Duke of Lorraine. (d.1508)
