= 1452 in France =

- Decades: 1430s; 1440s; 1450s; 1460s; 1470s
- See also: History of France; Timeline of French history; List of years in France

Events from the year 1452 in France.

== Incumbents ==
- Monarch – Charles VII

== Events ==
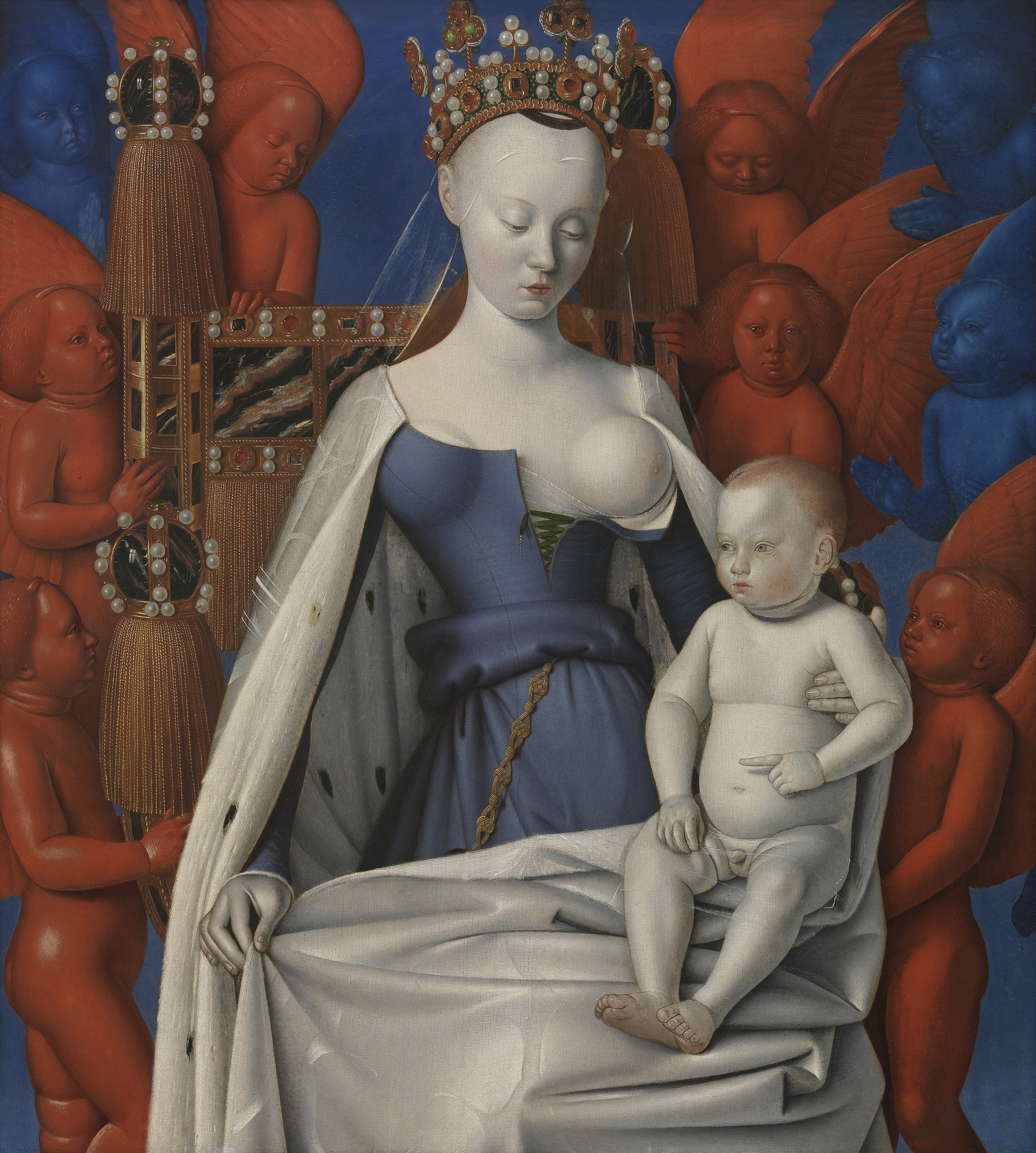
Right wing of the Melun Diptych; Virgin and Child Surrounded by Angels.

- Ongoing since 1449 – Revolt of Ghent

== Arts ==
- The Melun Diptych, a two-panel oil painting by the French court painter Jean Fouquet, was created around 1452.

== Deaths ==
- 13 June – Jean d'Harcourt, Roman Catholic priest and bishop.
- 18 December – John VII, Count of Harcourt, nobleman (b. 1369)
- Unknown – Guillaume de Littera, Roman Catholic canon and provost (b. 1371).
