= Shut Up and Die Like an Aviator =

Live album by Steve Earle and the Dukes
- Released: September 17, 1991
- Recorded: October 1990
- Genre: Country, Country rock
- Length: 75:58
- Label: MCA
- Producer: Steve Earle

Steve Earle and the Dukes chronology
BBC Radio 1 Live in Concert (1992)	Shut Up and Die Like an Aviator (1991)	Together at the Bluebird Café (1997)

Professional ratings
Review scores
Source	Rating
AllMusic	3.5/5 stars

Shut Up and Die Like an Aviator is a live album by Steve Earle and the Dukes. The album was released in 1991 and recorded live in London and Kitchener (misspelled in the liner notes as "Kitchner") Ontario, Canada, in October 1990.

The title was inspired by an anecdote told by author Tom Wolfe in his 1979 non-fiction work, The Right Stuff.

== Track listing ==
All songs written by Steve Earle unless otherwise noted.

1. "Intro" - 0:53
2. "Good Ol' Boy (Gettin' Tough)" - 4:23 (Earle, Richard Bennett)
3. "Devil's Right Hand" - 3:06
4. "I Ain't Ever Satisfied" - 4:07
5. "Someday" - 3:54
6. "West Nashville Boogie" - 7:25
7. "Snake Oil" - 3:02
8. "Standin' on the Corner (Blue Yodel No. 9)" - 1:36 (Jimmie Rodgers)
9. "The Other Kind" - 5:35
10. "Billy Austin" - 7:08
11. "Copperhead Road" - 4:34
12. "Fearless Heart" - 4:36
13. "Guitar Town" - 3:36
14. "I Love You Too Much" - 5:37
15. "She's About a Mover" - 4:14 (Doug Sahm)
16. "The Rain Came Down" - 4:50 (Earle, Michael Woody)
17. "Dead Flowers" - 8:15 (Mick Jagger, Keith Richards)

== Personnel ==
- Steve Earle - lead vocals, electric and acoustic guitars, 6 string bass, mandolin

The Dukes

- Bucky Baxter - steel guitar, electric and acoustic guitars, 6 string bass
- Zip Gibson - electric guitar, background vocals
- Kelly Looney - bass, background vocals
- Stacey Earle Mims - background vocals, acoustic guitar, percussion
- Ken Moore - keyboards
- Craig Wright - drums
- Kurt Custer - background vocals on "Fearless Heart"
