= 1466 in France =

- Decades: 1440s; 1450s; 1460s; 1470s; 1480s
- See also: History of France; Timeline of French history; List of years in France

Events from the year 1466 in France.

== Incumbents ==
- Monarch – Louis XI
- Archbishop of Reims – Jean Juvénal des Ursins

== Events ==
- Louis XI introduces silk weaving to Lyon
- The city of Dinant is pillaged under Charles the Bold of Burgundy amidst the Wars of Liege
- Charles of France, Duke of Berry, Normandy, and Guyenne flees to Brittany in the aftermath of the War of the Public Weal

== Deaths ==
- 24 April - Margaret, Countess of Vertus, widow of the Duke of Brittany (born 1406)
