= 1463 in France =

- Decades: 1440s; 1450s; 1460s; 1470s; 1480s
- See also: History of France; Timeline of French history; List of years in France

Events from the year 1463 in France.

== Incumbents ==
- Monarch – Louis XI

== Births ==
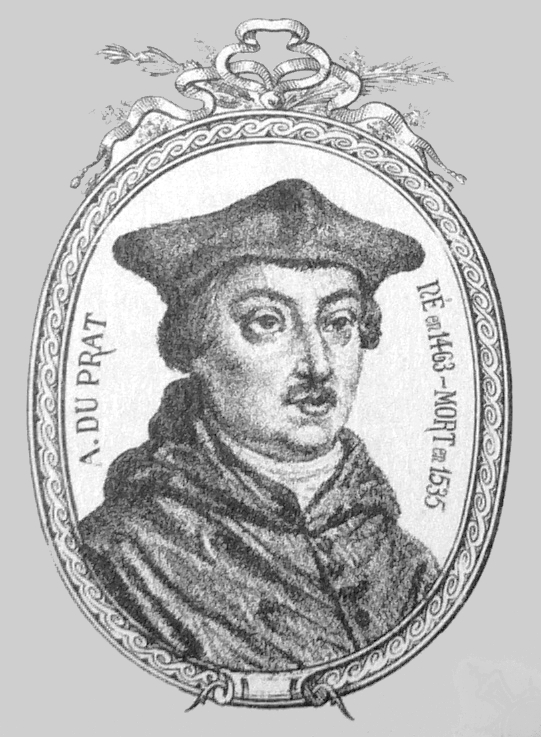
Antoine Duprat

=== Full date missing ===
- Antoine Duprat, cardinal and politician (died 1535)

== Deaths ==
=== Full date missing ===
- Jean Bureau, artillery commander (born c.1390)
- William Vorilong, philosopher and theologian (born c.1390)
- François Villon, poet and criminal (born 1431; disappeared from view in 1463)
- Marie of Anjou, queen consort (born 1404)
