= 1455 in France =

- Decades: 1430s; 1440s; 1450s; 1460s; 1470s
- See also: History of France; Timeline of French history; List of years in France

Events from the year 1455 in France.

== Incumbents ==
- Monarch – Charles VII

== Births ==
- Jean de Ganay

== Deaths ==
- 28 October - Guillaume-Hugues d'Estaing, cardinal
