= Lancastrian =

Lancastrian may refer to:

- Avro Lancastrian, an airliner
- Lancastrian, a native or inhabitant of Lancashire, England
- Lancastrian, a native or inhabitant of Lancaster, England
- Lancastrian, a partisan on the side of the House of Lancaster in the Wars of the Roses
- Lancastrian, a system of education devised by Joseph Lancaster
- Lancastrian, a person or thing associated with Lancaster University

== See also ==
- Lancaster (disambiguation)
- Lancastria (disambiguation)
- Old Lancastrian, a former pupil of Lancaster Royal Grammar School, England
- The Lancastrians, a British pop rock band
