= 1456 in France =

- Decades: 1430s; 1440s; 1450s; 1460s; 1470s
- See also: History of France; Timeline of French history; List of years in France

Events from the year 1456 in France.

== Incumbents ==
- Monarch – Charles VII

== Events ==
- 7 July - A Retrial of Joan of Arc overturns her original conviction

== Deaths ==
- 17 January - Elisabeth of Lorraine-Vaudémont, writer (b.1395)
- 17 October - Nicolas Grenon, composer (b.1375)
- 25 November Jacques Cœur, merchant. (b.c.1395)
- 4 December - Charles I, Duke of Bourbon, nobleman (b.1401)
