= 1458 in France =

- Decades: 1430s; 1440s; 1450s; 1460s; 1470s
- See also: History of France; Timeline of French history; List of years in France

Events from the year 1458 in France.

== Incumbents ==
- Monarch – Charles VII

== Death ==
- 22 March – Antoine, Count of Vaudémont, nobleman (born 1400)
- 26 December – Arthur III, Duke of Brittany, ruler of Brittany (born 1393)
