= 1470 in France =

- Decades: 1450s; 1460s; 1470s; 1480s; 1490s
- See also: History of France; Timeline of French history; List of years in France

Events from the year 1470 in France.

== Incumbents ==
- King of France – Louis XI
- Duke of Burgundy - Charles the Bold
- Duke of Brittany - Francis II

== Events ==
=== January–December ===
- April: After the Yorkist victory at the Battle of Losecoat Field, the Earl of Warwick and Duke of Clarence land at Calais. Despite being Captain of Calais, Warwick was refused access to the stronghold and was subsequently forced to flee to Honfleur.
- 22 July: In the Angers Agreement, Louis XI reconciles the Earl of Warwick and Margaret of Anjou. Both agree to restore Henry VI to the English throne.
- 13 August: An invasion force under the Earl of Warwick and Duke of Clarence leaves Angers, sailing for England.

=== Date Unknown ===
- Johann Heynlin and Guillaume Fichet privately establish the first printing press at the Sorbonne University. They print Gasparino Barzizza's Epistolarum Liber, the first book printed in France.

== Births ==
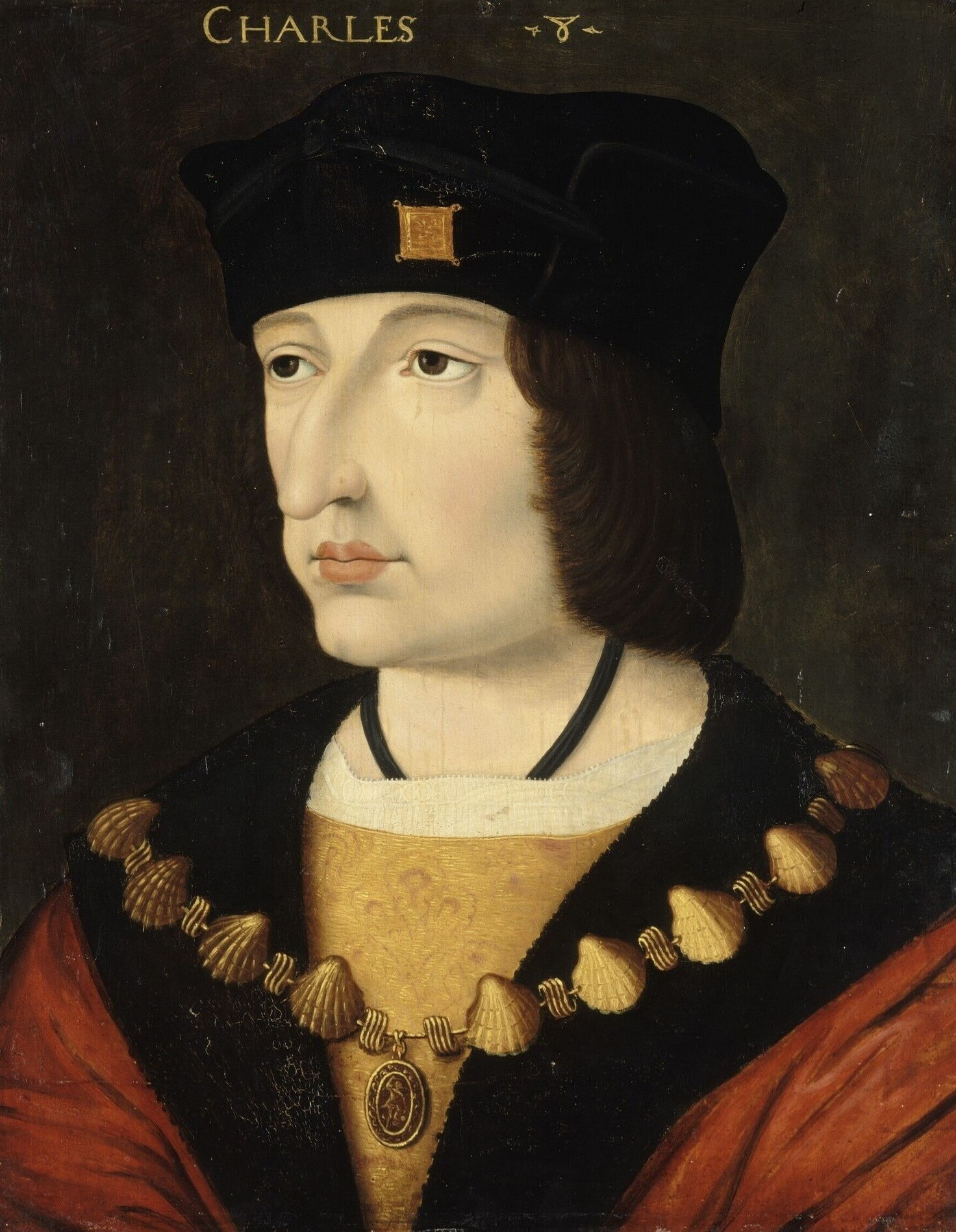
Charles VIII, King of France 1483–1498

- 30 June – Charles VIII of France (died 1498)

=== Full date missing ===
- Estienne de La Roche, mathematician (died 1530)
- Francis, Count of Vendôme, prince (died 1495)
- Guillaume de Marcillat, painter and stained glass artist (died 1529)
- Jacques de La Palice, nobleman (died 1525)

== Deaths ==
=== Full date missing ===
- Richard Olivier de Longueil, bishop (born 1406)
- Guigone de Salins (born 1403)
