= 1465 in France =

- Decades: 1440s; 1450s; 1460s; 1470s; 1480s
- See also: History of France; Timeline of French history; List of years in France

Events from the year 1465 in France.

== Incumbents ==
- Monarch – Louis XI

== Events ==
- 16 July - Louis XI fights the inconclusive Battle of Montlhéry during the War of the Public Weal
- 5 October - Louis XI signs the Treaty of Conflans granting concessions to his opponents
- The League of the Public Weal was established

== Deaths ==
- 5 January - Charles I, Duke of Orléans, soldier and poet (born 1394)
