= 1454 in France =

- Decades: 1430s; 1440s; 1450s; 1460s; 1470s
- See also: History of France; Timeline of French history; List of years in France

Events from the year 1454 in France.

== Incumbents ==
- Monarch – Charles VII

== Events ==
- 17 February – The Feast of the Pheasant takes place in Lille.

=== Date Unknown ===
- René, Duke of Alençon (d.1492)

== Deaths ==
=== Date Unknown ===
- Jean d'Arces, cardinal.
- Philippe de Culant, nobleman and soldier. (b.1413)
