= We'll Sing in the Sunshine =

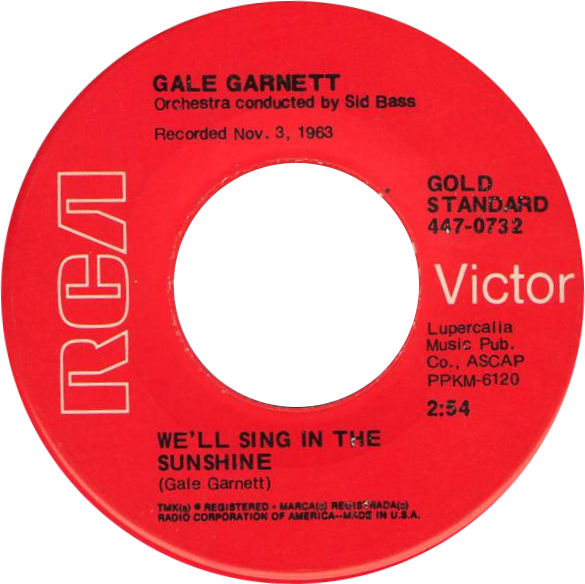
- US reissue of the Gale Garnett recording

Single by Gale Garnett

from the album My Kind of Folk Songs
- B-side: "Prism Song"
- Released: July 1964
- Recorded: 1964
- Genre: Folk
- Length: 2:54
- Label: RCA Victor
- Songwriter: Gale Garnett
- Producer: Andy Wiswell

Gale Garnett singles chronology
"We'll Sing in the Sunshine" (1964)	"Lovin' Place" (1964)

"We'll Sing in the Sunshine" is a 1964 hit song written and recorded by Gale Garnett which reached No. 2 in Canada, and No. 4 on the U.S. Billboard Hot 100 chart for the week ending 17 October 1964. It also enjoyed success on easy listening and country music radio stations, spending six weeks at No. 1 on the Billboard Easy Listening chart and No. 43 on the country chart. The Cash Box Top 100 ranked "We'll Sing in the Sunshine" at No. 1 for the week of 31 October 1964, and it also reached No. 1 in Garnett's native New Zealand that November. In Australia, "We'll Sing in the Sunshine" afforded Garnett a Top Ten hit with a No. 10 peak in October 1964. Garnett's sole Top 40 hit, "We'll Sing in the Sunshine" won the Grammy Award for Best Ethnic or Traditional Folk Recording in 1965.

The song was inducted into the Canadian Songwriters Hall of Fame in 2015.

== Lyrics ==
In the song, a woman tells her would-be lover that she does not believe in long-term relationships. She says she will give him a year, then leave him, and assures him he will look back fondly on their year together.

== Chart history ==
=== Weekly charts ===
Gale Garnett

Chart (1964)	Peak position
Australia (Kent Music Report)	10
Canada RPM Adult Contemporary	1
Canada RPM Top Singles	2
New Zealand (Lever Hit Parade)	1
U.S. Billboard Hot 100	4
U.S. Billboard Adult Contemporary	1
U.S. Billboard Country	42
U.S. Cash Box Top 100	1

The Lancastrians

Chart (1964–65)	Peak position
UK Singles (OCC)	44

LaWanda Lindsey

Chart (1970)	Peak position
U.S. Billboard Country	63

Helen Reddy

Chart (1978)	Peak position
Canada RPM Adult Contemporary	31
U.S. Billboard Adult Contemporary	12

=== Year-end charts ===
Chart (1964)	Rank
U.S. Billboard Hot 100	8

== Cover versions ==
In the UK, "We'll Sing in the Sunshine" was covered by The Lancastrians in a version produced by Shel Talmy and featuring guitar work from both Jimmy Page and Big Jim Sullivan. It charted at No. 44 in the UK in December 1964. The New Christy Minstrels included a bossa-nova version of the song on their 1965 album, Chim Chim Cher-ee. Mark Wynter had a non-charting UK single release of "We'll Sing in the Sunshine" in 1966. Sonny & Cher recorded the song for their 1967 album, In Case You're in Love, and Wanda Jackson covered it on her 1969 album The Happy Side of Wanda.

"We'll Sing in the Sunshine" was a minor C&W hit in 1970 for LaWanda Lindsey, reaching No. 63, serving as the title cut for Lindsey's album.

Helen Reddy remade the song, with Kim Fowley producing, for her May 1978 album release We'll Sing in the Sunshine with the track being released as advance single on 28 March, with a special 1 March advance release in Hawaii, in hopes a new single release from Reddy would foment interest in the singer's high-profile Easter Sunday (26 March) Sheraton Waikiki shows, and also that a "sunshine" song might be afforded an early breakout in a tropical region. The single failed to arouse any evident Top 40 radio interest, becoming the first lead single from a Helen Reddy album to fall short of the Hot 100 in Billboard: "We'll Sing in the Sunshine" afforded Reddy her last Top 20 ranking on Billboard's Adult Contemporary chart. Reddy's live recording of "We'll Sing in the Sunshine" was featured on her concert album Live in London recorded at the Palladium in May 1978. In 1984, Dolly Parton sang the song on her album of covers, The Great Pretender, released by RCA Records. It was one of her last records with RCA.

== See also ==
- List of number-one adult contemporary singles of 1964 (U.S.)
- The Marketts
