= Code Red Cloud Nine =

Studio album by Richard Bennett
- Released: 2008
- Genre: Jazz
- Label: Moderne Shellac
- Producer: Richard Bennett

Richard Bennett chronology
Themes From A Rainy Decade (2004)	Code Red Cloud Nine (2008)

Code Red Cloud Nine is the second solo album by Richard Bennett, released on Moderne Shellac in February, 2008.

- "With his latest release, Code Red Cloud Nine, Bennett and his golden tone guitar come swinging back with a dozen unbeatable originals. It's the stuff that dreams are made of....romance, adventure, mystery and danger."
- "I believe these tracks might reflect the real 'heart and soul' of Richard Bennett. Of course, I think that about everything I hear him play, whether it's jazz, blues, country, pop or rock and roll. And perhaps, as someone once said, he plays that way just because he can!" . . . . Duane Eddy

== Track list ==
1. "Squisito"
2. "Something For Tina"
3. "It's A Lucky Old World"
4. "Snoozin' At Sue's"
5. "En Trois"
6. "When Connie Used To Care"
7. "April By Twilight"
8. "Casey's Place"
9. "Spring Stepped In"
10. "Samba Soliel"
11. "Penthouse Prelude"
12. "Right On The Price, Right On The Corner"

== Featuring ==
- Ted Tretiak - drums
- David Hungate - bass
- Mike Noble - guitar
- Nick Bennett - guitar
- Richard Bennett - solo guitar

== with ==
- Jim Hoke - alto sax, harmonica, clarinet, flute, tenor sax, string arrangement on It's a Lucky Old World
- Jim Williamson - trumpet
- Robbie Shankle - English horn
- Bill Huber - trombone
- Tom Hensley - piano
- John Hobbs, Tyson Rogers - hammond organ
- George Bradfute - violin, viola, cello, keyboard, string arrangement on Right On The Price, Right On The Corner
- Jonathan Yudkin - violin, viola, cello
- Kirby Shelstad, Paul Burch, Dave Hoffner - vibes
- Chad Cromwell - drums on Penthouse Prelude
- Byron House - bass on Penthouse Prelude
