= We'll Sing in the Sunshine (album) =

Studio album by Helen Reddy
- Released: 2 May 1978
- Recorded: January – February 1978
- Studios: Larrabee North, Hollywood; Sound Lab, Los Angeles; A&M, Hollywood
- Length: 34:11
- Label: Capitol
- Producers: Kim Fowley; Nick DeCaro

Helen Reddy chronology
Ear Candy (1977)	We'll Sing in the Sunshine (1978)	Live in London (1978)

Professional ratings
Review scores
Source	Rating
AllMusic	2/5 stars

We'll Sing in the Sunshine is the tenth studio album by Australian-American pop singer Helen Reddy that was released in 1978 by Capitol Records. The album included two songs that were also covered by Johnny Mathis in the first half of that year: "All I Ever Need", which came out on his March release, You Light Up My Life, and "Ready or Not", on which he duetted with Deniece Williams for their June release, That's What Friends Are For. Reddy also ventures into Beatles territory with their rockabilly number "One After 909" and takes on Jeff Lynne's "Poor Little Fool" with accompaniment in the vein of Electric Light Orchestra. This was her first album not to reach Billboard's Top LP's & Tapes chart. On 23 February 2010, it was released for the first time on compact disc as one of two albums on one CD, the other album being her 1977 release, Ear Candy. "Blue" was originally featured on the 1977 animated film Raggedy Ann & Andy: A Musical Adventure.

== Singles ==
Just as the lead single ("You're My World") of Reddy's previous album, Ear Candy, was a cover, so was the case here. "We'll Sing in the Sunshine", a hit for Gale Garnett in 1964, was released on 27 March 1978, and became Reddy's first lead single not to appear on the Billboard Hot 100. It did, however, debut on Billboard's Easy Listening chart in the 22 April issue, and peaked at number 12 during its nine weeks there. Of this song, Reddy writes, "For those who can't commit because they hear the call of the open road, this one is for you."

"Ready or Not" had its Easy Listening chart debut as the second single from the album later that year, in the 1 July issue, and got as high as number 28 over the course of eight weeks. The 15 July issue saw the start of the song's five-week run on the Hot 100, during which time it made it to number 73, and in Canada's RPM magazine it reached number 70 pop.

== Track listing ==
Side 1

1. "Ready or Not" (Amber DiLena, Jerry Keller) – 3:51
2. "All I Ever Need" (Jacques Sawyer) – 3:28
3. "Poor Little Fool" (Jeff Lynne) – 4:09
4. "One After 909" (John Lennon, Paul McCartney) – 3:02
5. "I'd Rather Be Alone" (Bruce Roberts) – 4:16

Side 2

1. "Lady of the Night" (Richard Germinaro, Evie Sands, Ben Weisman) – 3:17
2. "Catch My Breath" (Alan O'Day) – 2:56
3. "We'll Sing in the Sunshine" (Gale Garnett) – 3:34
4. "Blue" (Joe Raposo) – 4:32
5. "If I Ever Had to Say Goodbye to You" (Steve Gibb) – 3:02

Rarities from the Capitol Vaults tracks

In 2009 EMI Music Special Markets released Rarities from the Capitol Vaults, a 12-track CD of mostly what were previously unreleased Reddy recordings. Four of the songs were taken from the recording sessions for We'll Sing in the Sunshine, including an alternate version of "Blue" and:

- "Me and My Love" (Bruce Roberts, Carole Bayer Sager) – 3:28
- "Together" (Charles Fox, Norman Gimbel) – 3:23
- "Rhythm Rhapsody" (Ralph Schuckett, John Siegler) – 4:15

== Personnel ==
- Helen Reddy – vocals
- Charles Koppelman – executive producer
- Francesco Scavullo – photography
- Roy Kohara – art direction

Personnel on "All I Ever Need", "Catch My Breath", "I'd Rather Be Alone", "If I Ever Had to Say Goodbye to You", "Poor Little Fool", "We'll Sing in the Sunshine"

- Kim Fowley – producer
- Taavi Moté – recording and remix engineer
- Sherry Klein – assistant engineer
- Linda Corbin – assistant engineer
- John Golden – mastering
  - recorded and mixed at Larrabee Sound Studios
- Billy Thomas – drums
- Willie Ornelas – drums
- Richard Bennett – guitar; steel guitar ("All I Ever Need")
- Doug Rohen – guitar
- Jay Graydon – guitar
- Mitch Holder – guitar
- Thom Rotella – guitar
- Dan Ferguson – guitar
- David Hungate – bass guitar
- Reini Press – bass guitar
- Jim Hughart – bass guitar
- Scott Edwards – bass guitar
- David Carr – keyboards
- Alan Lindgren – keyboards
- Eric Bikales – keyboards
- Vince Charles – percussion
- Gene Estes – percussion
- Kim Fowley – percussion
- Ben Benay – harmonica ("We'll Sing in the Sunshine")

Additional personnel on "All I Ever Need", "Catch My Breath", "If I Ever Had to Say Goodbye to You", "Poor Little Fool"

- Marc Peters – arranger; conductor; associate producer
- Sid Sharp – concertmaster
- Laura Creamer – background vocals
- Mark Creamer – background vocals
- Denyce Deuschle – background vocals
- Barbara Cross – background vocals
- Nick Uhrig – background vocals
- Marc Piscitelli – background vocals

Additional personnel on "I'd Rather Be Alone", "We'll Sing in the Sunshine"

- David Carr – arranger and conductor
- Jack Shulman – concertmaster
- Amy Boersma – background vocals ("We'll Sing in the Sunshine")
- Marcia Waldorf – background vocals ("We'll Sing in the Sunshine")
- Kate Hopkins – background vocals ("We'll Sing in the Sunshine")
- B. J. Emmons – background vocals ("We'll Sing in the Sunshine")
- Gale Kanter – background vocals ("We'll Sing in the Sunshine")
- David Carr – background vocals ("We'll Sing in the Sunshine")
- John Joyce – background vocals ("We'll Sing in the Sunshine")
- Mark Creamer – background vocals ("We'll Sing in the Sunshine")
- Jim McMains – background vocals ("We'll Sing in the Sunshine")
- Moose McMains –background vocals ("We'll Sing in the Sunshine")

Personnel on "Blue", "Lady of the Night", "One After 909", "Ready or Not"

- Nick DeCaro – producer; arranger (orchestra and singers); rhythm arranger ("Blue", "One After 909")
- David Wolfert – rhythm arranger ("Lady of the Night", "Ready or Not")
  - recorded at Sound Labs
- Mallory Earl – mixing engineer
  - mixing at Hollywood Sound
- Steve Mitchell – orchestra recording engineer
  - orchestra recorded at A&M Studios
- Ed Greene – drums
- Steve Lukather – guitar
- Thom Rotella – guitar
- Reini Press – bass guitar
- Steve Forman – percussion
- Jay Daversa – trumpet
- Bud Shank – saxophone
- Ian Underwood – synthesizers
- Tom Hensley – piano ("Blue", "One After 909")
- Jai Winding – piano ("Lady of the Night", "Ready or Not")
- Jim Gilstrap – background vocals
- Angela Winbush – background vocals
- Stephanie Spruill – background vocals
