= Copperhead Road =

Studio album by Steve Earle
- Released: October 17, 1988
- Recorded: December 1987 − July 1988
- Studios: Ardent (Memphis, Tennessee); Livingston (London, UK)
- Genres: Country rock; hard rock; rockabilly; rock and roll
- Length: 43:36
- Label: Uni
- Producers: Steve Earle, Tony Brown

Steve Earle chronology
Exit 0 (1987)	Copperhead Road (1988)	The Hard Way (1990)

Copperhead Road is the third studio album by Steve Earle, released in 1988. The album is often referred to as Earle's first "rock record"; Earle himself calls it the world's first blend of heavy metal and bluegrass, and the January 26, 1989 review of the album by Rolling Stone suggested that the style be called "power twang".

== Composition ==
The songs on side one of the album reflect Earle's politics: the title track attacks the war on drugs, and the song "Snake Oil" compares then president Ronald Reagan to a traveling con man and draws attention to his "legacy of creative deceit". The title track and "Johnny Come Lately" (performed with The Pogues) both describe the experiences of returning veterans. The latter compares the experience of US servicemen fighting in World War II with those in the Vietnam War, and contrasts the differing receptions they received on returning home. "Back to the Wall" is about poverty, describing the life of the homeless in the US.

The second side of the album consists of more traditional love songs and a Christmas-themed offering in "Nothing but a Child", a duet performed with Maria McKee.

== Reception ==
Professional ratings
Review scores
Source	Rating
AllMusic	4/5 stars
The Encyclopedia of Popular Music	4/5 stars
Rolling Stone	4/5 stars

In declaring Copperhead Road Rock Album of the Week on October 21, 1988, The New York Times described it as "exactly half of a brilliant album, with five smart, ornery, memorable story-songs." With references to Bruce Springsteen, John Mellencamp and the Rolling Stones the paper applauded Earle for introducing country music's storytelling and three-chord structures to rockabilly and contemporary rock music. Side two, however, the Times dismissed as "strictly average" love songs and a "hokey" Christmas song. Time, including it in the September 19, 1988, Critics' Choices, described it as a "rock-inflected, country-based album" that "takes long chances with big themes ... and does them proud".

Rolling Stone published their review of Copperhead Road on January 26, 1989. Rob Tannenbaum wrote that the album "begins murderously and ends sentimentally ... split into two song cycles" and described the first side as being "as powerful as any music made this year". Of side two he admits disappointment at conventional love songs, saying Earle "has already examined this terrain and done a better job of it." Nonetheless, the review compares Earle to Randy Newman, Bruce Springsteen, and Waylon Jennings among others, and concludes with Rolling Stone's designation of Earle as an "important artist" and finding Copperhead Road worthy of four stars.

Airplay on rock radio stations drove the title track into Billboard's Album Rock Top Ten chart, and that in turn helped Copperhead Road on Billboard's Album Chart, where it peaked at number 56.

Waylon Jennings covered "The Devil's Right Hand" on 1986's Will the Wolf Survive. "I was a big Waylon Jennings fan", noted Bob Seger, who covered the song on 2014's Ride Out. "I heard 'The Devil's Right Hand' in a movie called Betrayed in 1988. Every time I'd see it on cable, maybe once every five years, I'd say, 'Goddamn, that's a cool song. I want to do that some day.' And then, in maybe 2000, I found the movie in a movie bin, watched it and was like, 'Oh my god, Steve Earle wrote it! No wonder I like it.'"

In 2000 it was voted number 412 in Colin Larkin's All Time Top 1000 Albums.

== Track listing ==
=== Original release (1988) ===
All tracks are written by Steve Earle except where noted.

No.	Title	Writer(s)	Length
1.	"Copperhead Road"		4:29
2.	"Snake Oil"		3:31
3.	"Back to the Wall"		5:29
4.	"The Devil's Right Hand" (arranged by Garry W. Tallent)		3:04
5.	"Johnny Come Lately"		4:11
6.	"Even When I'm Blue"		4:14
7.	"You Belong to Me"		4:25
8.	"Waiting on You"	Steve Earle, Richard Bennett	5:10
9.	"Once You Love"	Steve Earle, Larry Crane	4:39
10.	"Nothing but a Child"		4:26

=== Deluxe edition (2008) ===
On April 29, 2008, Geffen Records/Universal Music released a 2-disc deluxe edition of Copperhead Road. Disc one is the album as listed above, digitally remastered. Disc two features previously unreleased live recordings.

==== Disc two ====
No.	Title	Writer(s)	Length
1.	"The Devil's Right Hand" (live in Raleigh, North Carolina – November 19, 1987)		4:02
2.	"Fearless Heart" (live in Raleigh)		4:32
3.	"San Antonio Girl" (live in Raleigh)		4:23
4.	"Nobody but You"/"Continental Trailways Bus" (live in Raleigh)		6:26
5.	"My Baby Worships Me" (live in Raleigh)		3:33
6.	"Wheels" (live in Raleigh)	Chris Hillman, Gram Parsons	4:45
7.	"The Week of Living Dangerously" (live in Raleigh)		7:26
8.	"Johnny Come Lately" (solo, live in Raleigh)		3:55
9.	"Brown and Root" (live in Raleigh)	Emmylou Harris, Rodney Crowell	3:46
10.	"I Love You Too Much" (live in Raleigh)		4:28
11.	"It's All Up to You" (live in Raleigh)	Steve Earle, Harry Stinson	6:11
12.	"Nebraska" (solo, live – 1988)	Bruce Springsteen	5:21
13.	"Copperhead Road" (live in Calgary, Canada – April 1989)		4:08
14.	"I Ain't Ever Satisfied" (live in Calgary)		3:52
15.	"Dead Flowers" (live in Calgary)	Mick Jagger, Keith Richards	5:36
16.	"Little Sister" (solo, live in Calgary)	Greg Trooper	3:15
17.	"Guitar Town" (live in Calgary)		2:36

== Personnel ==
- Steve Earle – vocals, guitars, harmonica, 6-string bass, mandolin
- Donny Roberts – guitars, 6-string bass
- Bill Lloyd – acoustic guitar, 12-string electric guitar
- Bucky Baxter – pedal steel, lap steel, Dobro
- Ken Moore – synthesizer and organ
- John Barlow Jarvis – piano
- Kelley Looney – bass
- Kurt Custer – drums
- Neil MacColl – mandolin on "Johnny Come Lately"
- John Cowan, Maria McKee, Radney Foster – background vocals
- Chris Birkett – drum programming on "You Belong to Me"
- Gary Tallent – arrangement on "The Devil's Right Hand"
- The Pogues played on "Johnny Come Lately"
- Telluride played on "Nothing But a Child"

The Pogues

- Terry Woods – cittern
- Phil Chevron – guitar, vocals
- Jem Finer – banjo
- James Fearnley – accordion
- Spider Stacy – tin whistle, vocals
- Shane MacGowan – banjo, bodhran
- Darryl Hunt – bass
- Andrew Ranken – drums

Telluride

- Sam Bush – mandolin
- Jerry Douglas – dobro
- Mark O'Connor – violin
- Edgar Meyer – bass violin

Technical

- Joe Hardy – recording, mixing
- Chris Birkett – recording on "Johnny Come Lately"
- Simon Levy – art direction
- Jeff Morris – design
- June Beard – patch design

== Chart performance ==
Chart (1988)	Peak position
U.S. Billboard Top Country Albums	7
U.S. Billboard 200	56
Canadian RPM Country Albums	30
Canadian RPM Top Albums	14
UK Album Charts	42

Although no singles from the album were released in the U.S., three of the album's tracks were released as singles in the UK.

UK Single	Release date	Peak position
"Copperhead Road"	October 10, 1988	45
"Johnny Come Lately"	December 5, 1988	75
"Back to the Wall"	February 1989	did not chart
