= Gale Garnett =

Canadian singer (born 1942)

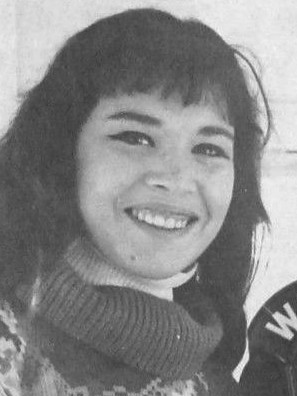
- Garnett in 1964
- Born: Gale Zoë Garnett; 17 July 1942 (age 84); Auckland, New Zealand
- Known for: "We'll Sing in the Sunshine"
- Musical career
- Genres: Pop; pop folk; folk
- Occupations: Singer; actress; author
- Years active: 1960–2000s
- Label: RCA Victor

Gale Zoë Garnett (born 17 July 1942) is a Canadian singer best known in the United States for her self-penned, Grammy-winning folk hit "We'll Sing in the Sunshine". Garnett is also an author and actress.

== Biography ==
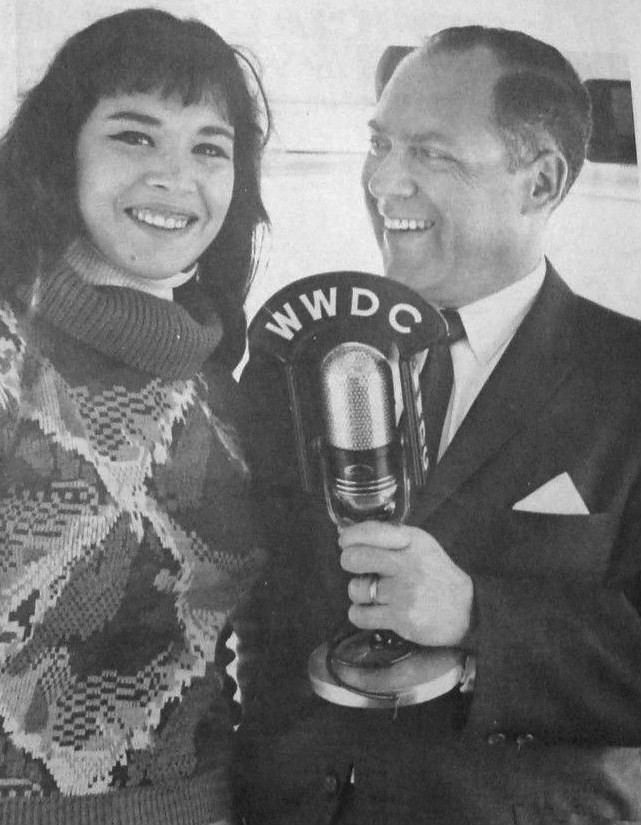
Garnett with WWDC's Fred Fiske in 1964

Garnett was born in Auckland, New Zealand, and moved to Canada with her family when she was 11. She made her public singing debut in 1960, while at the same time pursuing an acting career, making guest appearances on television shows such as 77 Sunset Strip.

She made her New York nightclub debut in 1963 at The Blue Angel Supper Club, and was signed by RCA Victor Records that same year. She recorded her debut album, My Kind of Folk Songs in 1964; that fall, she scored a number four pop hit with her original composition "We'll Sing in the Sunshine", which also hit number 1 on Billboard's Adult Contemporary singles chart for seven weeks and was a Top 50 country hit.

"We'll Sing in the Sunshine" won a 1965 Grammy for Best Folk Recording, and sold over one million copies, thus gaining gold disc status. Garnett was also nominated for Best Vocal Performance Female for that song. Riding its success, Garnett continued to record through the rest of the 1960s with her backing band the Gentle Reign. Her follow-up to "We'll Sing in the Sunshine", "Lovin' Place", was her only other single to chart in America.

Garnett appeared twice on ABC's Shindig! and The Lloyd Thaxton Show at the height of her singing fame in the mid-1960s. She also did the voice of the "Mother KOIT" liners for KOIT-FM (93.3 FM) in San Francisco in the mid to late 1960s during its era of progressive rock format (1968–1970).

Garnett voiced the character Francesca in the Rankin-Bass feature Mad Monster Party? in the late 1960s, singing the tunes "Our Time to Shine" and "Never Was a Love Like Mine". At this point, she had begun to be more influenced by the counterculture, and had embraced psychedelic themes to some extent. In the late 1960s, she recorded two albums of psychedelic-inflected music with the Gentle Reign.

In 1975, Garnett participated in an off-off-Broadway theater production of Starfollowers in an Ancient Land, written and directed by H.M. Koutoukas, at the La MaMa Experimental Theatre Club in New York City's East Village. Garnett performed in the cast, and also co-wrote the music for the production with Tom O'Horgan.

=== Later career ===
Although Garnett had retired from the music business by the 1980s, she continued occasionally appearing in feature films (including the sleeper hit My Big Fat Greek Wedding (2002)) and on television shows, usually in supporting roles.

In subsequent years, she branched out into journalism, writing essays, columns, and book reviews for various newspapers and magazines. She also wrote and performed two one-person theater pieces, Gale Garnett & Company and Life After Latex.

==== Books by Garnett ====
Garnett published her first novel, a romance titled Visible Amazement, in 1999. She followed with Transient Dancing (2003), the novella Room Tone (2007), and Savage Adoration, her latest release (2009).

== Discography ==
=== Albums ===
Year	Title, Label	Peak chart positions	Track listing
Year	Title, Label	US CB	Track listing
1964	My Kind of Folk Songs (RCA Victor)	25	Track list: 1. I Know You Rider; 2. Take This Hammer; 3. Oh Brandy Leave Me Alon; 4. Little Man, Nine Years Old; 5. I Came to the City; 6. Pretty Boy; 7. Wanderin'; 8. Prism Song; 9. We'll Sing in the Sunshine; 10. Sleep You Now; 11. Fly Bird
1965	Lovin' Place (RCA Victor)	—	Track list: 1. Lovin' Place; 2. You Are My Sunshine; 3. You've Been Talkin' 'Bout Me Baby; 4. Where Do You Go to Go Away; 5. Big Grey City; 6. Nobody Knows You When You're Down and Out; 7. What-cha Gonna Do; 8. I Used to Live Here; 9. The Sunny Song; 10. St. Louis Is a Long Way Away; 11. Little Poppa; 12. O Freedom
1965	The Many Faces of Gale Garnett (RCA Victor)	—	Track list: 1. Won't You Be My Lover; 2. Excuse Me Mister; 3. As Much As I Can; 4. Marionette; 5. Ain't Gonna Stay in Love Alone; 6. God Bless the Child; 7. Settle Down; 8. The Question Song; 9. Long Time Blues; 10. Forget It; 11. I Wish You Were Here; 12. St. James Infirmary
1965	Variety Is the Spice of Gale Garnett (RCA Victor)	—	Track list: 1. Why Am I Standing at the Window; 2. A Little Bit of Rain; 3. Has Anyone Here Seen Me?; 4. Small Potatoes; 5. The Same Game; 6. Carrick Fergus; 7. The Other Side of This Life; 8. Love Games; 9. I'm Gonna Be Myself By Myself; 10. If You Go Away Again; 11. People Come and Go; 12. Sometime You Gotta Let Somebody Down
1966	Growing Pains, Growing Pleasures (RCA Victor)	—	Track list: 1. Just Wait and See; 2. It's Been a Lovely Summer; 3. Little Something on the Side; 4. Blue Prelude; 5. Starting Anew; 6. Put Your Hands Down; 7. Morning Dew; 8. Sun Must Shine; 9. You've Got to Fall in Love Again; 10. No Other Name; 11. This Child; 12. Nice Man
1966	New Adventures (RCA Victor)	—	Track list: 1. Oh There'll Be Laughter; 2. Calm and Collected; 3. Where Did You Go?; 4. Angle Song; 5. Scarlet Ribbons (For Her Hair); 6. That Was Me You Ran Over; 7. So Long; 8. Let the Lonely Go; 9. Followin' the Rain; 10. Back with Me; 11. It Ain't Necessarily So
1967	Gale Garnett Sings About Flying and Rainbows and Love and Other Groovy Things (RCA Victor)	—	Track list: 1. I Make Him Fly; 2. Don't Hurt Him; 3. You're Gone Now; 4. Just Wait and See; 5. No Other Name; 6. This Child; 7. Over the Rainbow; 8. Lie to Me Easy; 9. You're Doing Me No Good; 10. The Sun Is Gray; 11. Look Who's Here; 12. I Am Shining
1968	An Audience with the King of Wands (with the Gentle Reign) (Columbia)	—	Track list: 1. Breaking Through; 2. Fall in Love Again; 3. Mini-Song #1: Ophelia Song; 4. Ballad for F. Scott Fitzgerald; 5. Big Sur; 6. Mini-Song #2: Tropicana High; 7. That's Not the Way; 8. A Word of Advice; 9. Believe Me; 10. Mini-Song #3: Lament for the Self-Sufficient; 11. You Could Have Been Anyone; 12. Bad News; 13. Dolphins; 14. Mini-Song #4: Tropicana Low
1969	Sausalito Heliport (with The Gentle Reign) (Columbia)	—	Track list: 1. Freddy Mahoney; 2. Peace Comes Slowly to the Trashing Fish; 3. The Pretty Is Gone; 4. This Year's Child; 5. Berkeley Barb Want Ad; 6. Deer in the City; 7. Water Your Mind; 8. My Mind's Own Morning; 9. The Trip Note Song; 10. Man in the Middle; 11. Freely Speaking

=== Singles (partial list) ===
Selected singles
Year	Catalogue number	Title	Peak chart positions		
Year	Catalogue number	Title	US Pop	US AC	US Country
1964	RCA 8388	"We'll Sing in the Sunshine" b/w "Prism Song"	4	1	42
1964	RCA 8472	"Lovin' Place" b/w "I Used to Live Here"	54	—	—
1965	RCA 8549	"I'll Cry Alone" b/w "Where Do You Go to Go Away"	108	—	—
1965	RCA 8668	"Why Am I Standing at the Window" b/w "I'm Gonna Sit Right Down and Write Myself a Letter"	—	—	—
1966	RCA 8961	"You've Got to Fall in Love Again" b/w "It's Been a Lovely Summer"	—	—	—
1966	RCA 8824	"This Kind of Love" b/w "Oh There'll Be Laughter"	—	—	—
1966	RCA 9020	"I Make Him Fly" b/w "The Sun Is Gray"	—	—	—
1967	RCA 9196	"Over the Rainbow" b/w "The Cats I Know"	—	—	—
1970s	RCA 40568	"Malaika" b/w "Pretty Boy" [single released earlier in Germany, 1965]	—	—	—

== Filmography ==
=== Film ===
Gale Garnett film credits
Year	Title	Role	Notes
1963	The Pink Panther	Princess Dala	Voice
1967	Mad Monster Party	Francesca	Voice
1972	Journey	Morgan, The Herbalist	
1973	Happy Mother's Day, Love George	Yolanda Perry	
1980	Tribute	Hilary	
1980	The Children	Cathy Freemont	
1985	Overnight	Del	
1990	Mr. & Mrs. Bridge	Mabel Ong	
1993	Thirty Two Short Films About Glenn Gould	Journalist	
1997	Men with Guns	Eileen Janey	
2002	My Big Fat Greek Wedding	Aunt Lexy	Credited as Gale Zoë Garnett

=== Television ===
Gale Garnett television credits
Year	Title	Role	Notes
1960	Hong Kong	Miss Wong	Episode: "When Strangers Meet"
1960	Hawaiian Eye	Joyce Gilbert	Episode: "White Pigeon Ticket"
1961	Hawaiian Eye	Kiana Soong	Episode: "The Trouble with Murder"
1960	77 Sunset Strip	China Mary	Episode: "The Double Death of Benny Markham"
1962	77 Sunset Strip	Velia	Episode: "Flight from Escondido"
1961	The Real McCoys	Maria	Episode: "Pepino's Wedding"
1962	The Real McCoys	Angela	Episode: "Pepino's Inheritance"
1963	The Real McCoys	Angela	Episode: "The Auction"
1962	Bonanza	Maria Winters	Episode: "The Deserter"
1962	Tales of Wells Fargo	Ruth	Episode: "Winter Storm"
1962	The Dick Powell Show	Paca	Episode: "Death in a Village"
1963	Have Gun - Will Travel	Prudence Powers	Episode: "Debutante"
1964	The Red Skelton Show	Guest Vocalist	1 episode (#14.8)
1964	Suspense	Janine	Episode: "I, Lloyd Benson"
1967	The Rat Patrol	Safti	Episode: "The Trial by Fire Raid"
1971	Paul Bernard, Psychiatrist	Mrs. Donaldson	1 episode
1975	Kojak	Elaine Kastos	Episode: "Night of the Piraeus"
1978	King of Kensington	Carol	Episode: "Carol's Arrival"
1978	King of Kensington	Carol	Episode: "Double Standard"
1980	The Littlest Hobo	Madame Sybil	Episode: "Carnival of Fear"
1983	Hangin' In	Renee	Episode: "She Shoots, He Scores"
1985	The Edison Twins	Lana Garbo	Episode: "Everyone a Rembrandt"
1986	The Park Is Mine	Rachel	TV movie
1987	The Equalizer	Frances	Episode: "Coal Black Soul"
1990	Leona Helmsley: The Queen of Mean	May	TV movie
1990	Friday the 13th: The Series	Dr. Sybil Oakwood	Episode: "The Tree of Life"
1992	E.N.G.	Lady Lovene	Episode: "Two for the Show"
1994	Janek: The Silent Betrayal	Ginette	TV movie
1995	Kung Fu: The Legend Continues	Jo Emery	Episode: "The Return of Sing Ling"
2005	Wild Card	Oxsana Petrovich	Episode: "Russian Missus Gets No Kisses" (credited as Gale Zoë Garnett)

== Soundtrack ==
- Penelope (1966 film) (words and music: "The Sun Is Gray")
