= Exit 0 =

Studio album by Steve Earle & the Dukes
- Released: May 18, 1987
- Studios: Emerald Sound (Nashville, Tennessee)
- Genre: Country rock
- Length: 38:01
- Label: MCA
- Producers: Tony Brown, Emory Gordy, Jr., Richard Bennett

Steve Earle & the Dukes chronology
Guitar Town (1986)	Exit 0 (1987)	Copperhead Road (1988)

Professional ratings
Review scores
Source	Rating
AllMusic	3.5/5 stars

Exit 0 is the second studio album from American singer-songwriter Steve Earle (credited to Steve Earle & The Dukes), released in 1987. Earle was nominated for a 1988 Grammy Award for Best Country Vocal Performance, Male, for the album.

The album was recorded digitally, using the Mitsubishi X-800 at Nashville's Emerald Studios. All of the album's ten tracks were written or co-written by Earle. Earle and his band played live shows regularly during breaks in recording.

Exit 0 is stylistically very similar to its predecessor, Guitar Town, and was Earle's final pure-country album before incorporating hard rock with country on his next releases. It is today described by AllMusic as "livelier stuff than nearly anyone in Nashville was cranking out at the time".

== Track listing ==
All songs written by Steve Earle unless otherwise noted.

No.	Title	Writer(s)	Length
1.	"Nowhere Road"	Earle, Reno Kling	2:27
2.	"Sweet Little '66"		2:38
3.	"No. 29"		3:30
4.	"Angry Young Man"	Earle, John Porter McMeans	4:24
5.	"San Antonio Girl"		3:06
6.	"The Rain Came Down"	Earle, Michael Woody	4:11
7.	"I Ain't Ever Satisfied"		4:00
8.	"The Week of Living Dangerously"		4:26
9.	"I Love You Too Much"		3:37
10.	"It's All Up to You"	Earle, Harry Stinson	5:42

== Personnel ==
The Dukes

- Bucky Baxter – steel guitar, vocals
- Steve Earle – lead vocals, acoustic guitar, electric guitar, harmonica
- Reno Kling – bass guitar
- Mike McAdam – 6- and 12-string electric guitars, vocals
- Ken Moore – organ, synthesizer, vocals
- Harry Stinson – drums, vocals

With:

- John Jarvis – piano
- Emory Gordy, Jr. – mandolin
- Richard Bennett – acoustic guitar, electric guitar, 6-string bass
- K-Meaux Boudin – accordion

Technical

- Chuck Ainlay – recording, mixing
- Jim DeVault – front cover photography

== Chart performance ==
Chart (1987)	Peak position
U.S. Billboard Top Country Albums	15
U.S. Billboard 200	90
Canadian RPM Top Albums	36
