= Sweet Little '66 =

Single by Steve Earle

from the album Exit 0
- B-side: "Angry Young Man"
- Released: October 17, 1987
- Length: 2:39
- Label: MCA
- Songwriter(s): Steve Earle
- Producer(s): Tony Brown, Emory Gordy Jr., Richard Bennett

Steve Earle singles chronology
"Nowhere Road" (1987)	"Sweet Little '66" (1987)	"Copperhead Road" (1988)

"Sweet Little '66" is a song written and recorded by American singer-songwriter Steve Earle. It was released in October 1987 as the third single from the album Exit 0. The song reached number 37 on the Billboard Hot Country Singles & Tracks chart.

== Chart performance ==
Chart (1987–1988)	Peak position
US Hot Country Songs (Billboard)	37
Canadian RPM Country Tracks	19
