= The Lancastrians =

British pop rock band

- Origin: Altrincham, Cheshire, England
- Genres: Rock, pop
- Years active: 1963-1967, 2001-2003
- Labels: Pye Records
- Past members: Barry Langtree; Kevin Heywood; Terry Benson; John Fleury; Steve Wilde
- Website: www.thelancastrians.co.uk

The Lancastrians were a British pop rock band, formed in Altrincham, Cheshire, England. They are best remembered for their only hit record, "We'll Sing in the Sunshine", released in December 1964.

Other single releases were "The World Keeps Going Round" written by Ray Davies, "Let's Lock the Door (And Throw Away the Key)", and "Was She Tall".

== History ==
The group was formed by Barry Langtree and Kevin Heywood in 1956, then known as The Heartbeats. They included vocalist, Tommy Hart, drummer Pete Yeoman, bassist Roger Goodier and became Tommy Hart & The Heartbeats. They were spotted by BBC radio scouts and recorded alongside the Northern Dance Orchestra. Once Hart left the group, they became Barry Langtree & The Lancastrians, and recruited two new members, Terry Benson on bass and John Fleury on drums. The band's manager decided to shorten their name to The Lancastrians.

They played alongside Tom Jones, Engelbert Humperdinck, Cilla Black, The Moody Blues, and appeared on television, plus they played summer and winter shows. They were introduced to the record producer, Shel Talmy, who produced all their six singles. Session players including Jimmy Page and Nicky Hopkins appeared on a couple of their singles. Page played back-up guitar on "Was She Tall" and "The World Keeps Going Round". Their cover version of "We'll Sing in the Sunshine", peaked at No. 44 in the UK Singles Chart in December 1964, where it had a two-week residency.

However, after a tour of Germany in 1967, they decided to disband.

The group reformed in February 2001, and played many local gigs including a reunion show in Chirk, Wales.

== Discography ==
- 1964: "We'll Sing in the Sunshine" / "Was She Tall" (Pye 7N 15732)
- 1965: "Let's Lock the Door (And Throw Away the Key)" / "If You're Gonna Leave Me" (Pye 7N 15791)
- 1965: "They'll Be No More Goodbyes" / "Never Gonna Come On Home" (Pye 7N 15846)
- 1965: "Lonely Man" / "I Can't Stand the Pain" (Pye 7N 15927)
- 1966: "The World Keeps Going Round" / "Not the Same Anymore" (Pye 7N 17043)
- 1966: "Ballad of the Green Berets" / "My Little Rose" (Pye 7N 17072)
