= Guitar Town =

Studio album by Steve Earle
- Released: March 5, 1986
- Studios: Sound Stage (Nashville, Tennessee); Emerald Sound (Nashville, Tennessee)
- Genres: Country rock; roots rock; heartland rock; alternative country
- Length: 34:35
- Label: MCA
- Producers: Emory Gordy, Jr., Tony Brown, Associate Producer: Richard Bennett

Steve Earle chronology
Guitar Town (1986)	Exit 0 (1987)

Singles from Guitar Town
- 1. "Hillbilly Highway" Released: March 22, 1986; 2. "Guitar Town" Released: June 2, 1986; 3. "Someday" Released: October 25, 1986; 4. "Goodbye's All We've Got Left" Released: January 1987

Professional ratings
Review scores
Source	Rating
AllMusic	5/5 stars
Robert Christgau	A−

Guitar Town is the debut studio album from American singer-songwriter Steve Earle, released on March 5, 1986. It topped the Billboard country album charts, and the title song reached No. 7 on the country singles chart. Earle was also nominated for two 1987 Grammy Awards, Best Male Country Vocalist and Best Country Song, for the title track.

== Production ==
The album was recorded in late 1985 and early 1986 in Nashville, Tennessee, at Sound Stage Studio. Overdubs were later recorded at Nashville's Emerald Studios. It was one of the first country music albums to be recorded digitally, utilizing the Mitsubishi X-800. Each of the album's original ten tracks was either written or co-written by Earle.

== Reception and legacy ==
In 2003, the album was ranked number 489 on Rolling Stone magazine's list of the 500 greatest albums of all time. In 2012, the magazine ranked it at No. 482 on a revised list, calling it "the rocker's version of country, packed with songs about hard living in the Reagan Eighties."

In 2006, it ranked 27th on CMT's "40 Greatest Albums in Country Music". In 2016, the album was re-released as a 30th Anniversary Edition with a corresponding tour.

The title track was later covered by Emmylou Harris. "Someday" was later covered by Shawn Colvin on her cover album, Cover Girl.

"My Old Friend The Blues" was covered by The Proclaimers.

== Track listing ==
All songs written by Steve Earle unless otherwise noted

No.	Title	Writer(s)	Length
1.	"Guitar Town"		2:33
2.	"Goodbye's All We've Got Left"		3:16
3.	"Hillbilly Highway"	Earle, Jimbeau Hinson	3:38
4.	"Good Ol' Boy (Gettin' Tough)"	Earle, Richard Bennett	3:58
5.	"My Old Friend the Blues"		3:07
6.	"Someday"		3:46
7.	"Think It Over"	Earle, Bennett	2:13
8.	"Fearless Heart"		4:04
9.	"Little Rock 'n' Roller"		4:49
10.	"Down the Road"	Earle, Hinson, Tony Brown	2:37

Added in a later reissue:

No.	Title	Writer(s)	Length
11.	"State Trooper [live]"	Bruce Springsteen	5:12

== Personnel ==
- Steve Earle – guitar, vocals

The Dukes

- Bucky Baxter – pedal steel guitar, guitar on "State Trooper"
- Richard Bennett – guitar, 6-string bass, slap bass, associate producer
- Ken Moore – organ, synthesizer, keyboards on "State Trooper"
- Emory Gordy, Jr. – bass, mandolin, producer
- Harry Stinson – drums, vocals
- Reno Kling – bass on "State Trooper"
- Michael McAdam – guitar on "State Trooper"

Additional musicians

- Paul Franklin – pedal steel guitar on "Fearless Heart" and "Someday"
- John Barlow Jarvis – synthesizer, piano
- Steve Nathan – synthesizer

Technical

- Chuck Ainlay – recording, mixing
- Alan Messer – photography

== Charts ==
=== Weekly charts ===
Chart (1986)	Peak position
Canadian Albums (RPM)	82
US Billboard 200	89
US Top Country Albums (Billboard)	1

=== Year-end charts ===
Chart (1986)	Position
US Top Country Albums (Billboard)	41

=== Singles ===
Year	Single	Peak chart positions	
Year	Single	US Country	CAN Country
1986	"Hillbilly Highway"	37	46
1986	"Guitar Town"	7	7
1986	"Someday"	28	31
1987	"Goodbye's All We Got Left"	8	10

== Certifications ==
Certifications for Guitar Town
Region	Certification	Certified units/sales
Canada (Music Canada)	Platinum	100,000^{^}
United States (RIAA)	Gold	500,000^{^}
^{^} Shipments figures based on certification alone.
