= 1468 in France =

- Decades: 1440s; 1450s; 1460s; 1470s; 1480s
- See also: History of France; Timeline of French history; List of years in France

Events from the year 1468 in France.

== Incumbents ==
- Monarch – Louis XI

== Events ==
- 1 April – Meeting of the Estates General in Tours.
- 10 September – Treaty of Ancenis is signed between France and Francis II, duke of Brittany.

== Births ==
=== Full date unknown ===
- Catherine of Navarre, Queen of Navarre (d.1517)

== Deaths ==
- 24 November – Jean de Dunois, nobleman (b.1402)

== Links ==
Media related to 1468 in France at Wikimedia Commons
