= Bucky Baxter =

American musician (1955–2020)

- Born: William Baxter; 1955; Melbourne, Florida, U.S.
- Died: May 25, 2020 (aged 65) Sanibel, Florida, U.S.
- Genres: Country; alternative country; rock
- Instruments: Guitar; mandolin
- Years active: 1986–2020
- Formerly of: Steve Earle and the Dukes

William "Bucky" Baxter (1955 – May 25, 2020) was an American guitarist. He is best known as a member of Steve Earle and The Dukes and as a member of Bob Dylan's backing band in the mid-90s during the Never Ending Tour. He released his only solo album, Most Likely, No Problem, in 1999.

== Early life ==
Baxter was born in Melbourne, Florida, in 1955. He started learning how to play pedal steel guitar in the 1970s. In the following decade, he met Steve Earle and played on the latter's debut album, Guitar Town in 1986.

== Career ==
Baxter was a founding member of The Dukes, Earle's backing band. He subsequently featured in three other albums by Earle – Exit 0 (1987), Copperhead Road (1988) and The Hard Way (1990) – providing vocals and guitar. It was on one of Earle's concert tours in the early 1990s that he first encountered Bob Dylan, who asked Baxter to give him lessons in how to play steel guitar. He played pedal steel guitar for Dylan's band on his Never Ending Tour from 1992 to 1999 and played pedal steel on Dylan's 1997 Grammy Award winning album, Time Out of Mind. After his time in Dylan's band came to an end, Baxter released a solo album, Most Likely, No Problem, in 1999. He was one of three co-founders of Moontoast, a social rich media advertising platform.

Baxter also appeared on various albums by artists including Ryan Adams, R.E.M., Beastie Boys and Joe Henry. In studio, or while performing live, Baxter played steel guitar, acoustic guitar, electric guitar, mandolin, dobro.

== Death ==
Baxter died on May 25, 2020, in Sanibel Island, Florida, at the age of 65, according to his son, Rayland. No cause was given.

== Discography ==
Year	Artist	Title	Instruments
1986	Steve Earle	Guitar Town	Pedal steel guitar
1987	Steve Earle	Exit 0	Steel guitar, vocals
1988	Steve Earle	Copperhead Road	Pedal steel, lap steel, dobro
1988	R.E.M.	Green	Pedal steel guitar
1990	Steve Earle	The Hard Way	Mullins pedal steel guitar
1991	Steve Earle	Shut Up and Die Like an Aviator	Steel guitar, electric and acoustic guitars, six-string bass
1995	Bob Dylan	Unplugged	Dobro, pedal steel guitar, mandolin
1996	Joe Henry	Trampoline	
1997	Bob Dylan	Time Out of Mind	Acoustic guitar, pedal steel
1999	Bucky Baxter	Most Likely, No Problem	
1999	Country Mike	Country Mike's Greatest Hits	Pedal steel guitar, fiddle
2001	Ryan Adams	The Suicide Handbook	Acoustic guitar
2001	Ryan Adams	Gold	Steel guitar
2002	Ryan Adams	Demolition	Pedal steel guitar, acoustic guitar, backing vocals
2002	Los Lobos	Good Morning Aztlán	Pedal steel guitar
2003	Cerys Matthews	Cockahoop	Producer, electric guitar, fiddle, vibraphone
2005	Ben Folds	Songs for Silverman	Pedal steel guitar, 12-string guitar
2005	Willy Clay Band	Rebecca Drive	Pedal steel
