= Taylor Brown (writer) =

American author

- Born: 1982 (age 43–44); Brunswick, Georgia
- Education: University of Georgia
- Occupation: Writer
- Website: www.taylorbrownfiction.com

Taylor Brown (1982) is an American author of Southern fiction.

== Early life and education ==
Taylor Brown was born in Brunswick, Georgia in 1982. He graduated from University of Georgia in 2005. He later moved to Buenos Aires, Argentina and was an English teacher there for eight months.

== Career ==
Brown published a collection of short stories, In The Season of Blood and Gold, in 2014. He has subsequently published six novels. Brown is also editor-in-chief of BikeBound, a motorcycle news publication. In 2025, he received the Southern Book Prize for Rednecks.

== Works ==
- Rednecks (2024)
- Pride of Eden (2020)
- Gods of Howl Mountain (2018)
- Fallen Land (2016)
