= Siege of Falaise (1450) =

Siege of Hundred Years War

- Part of the Hundred Years' War
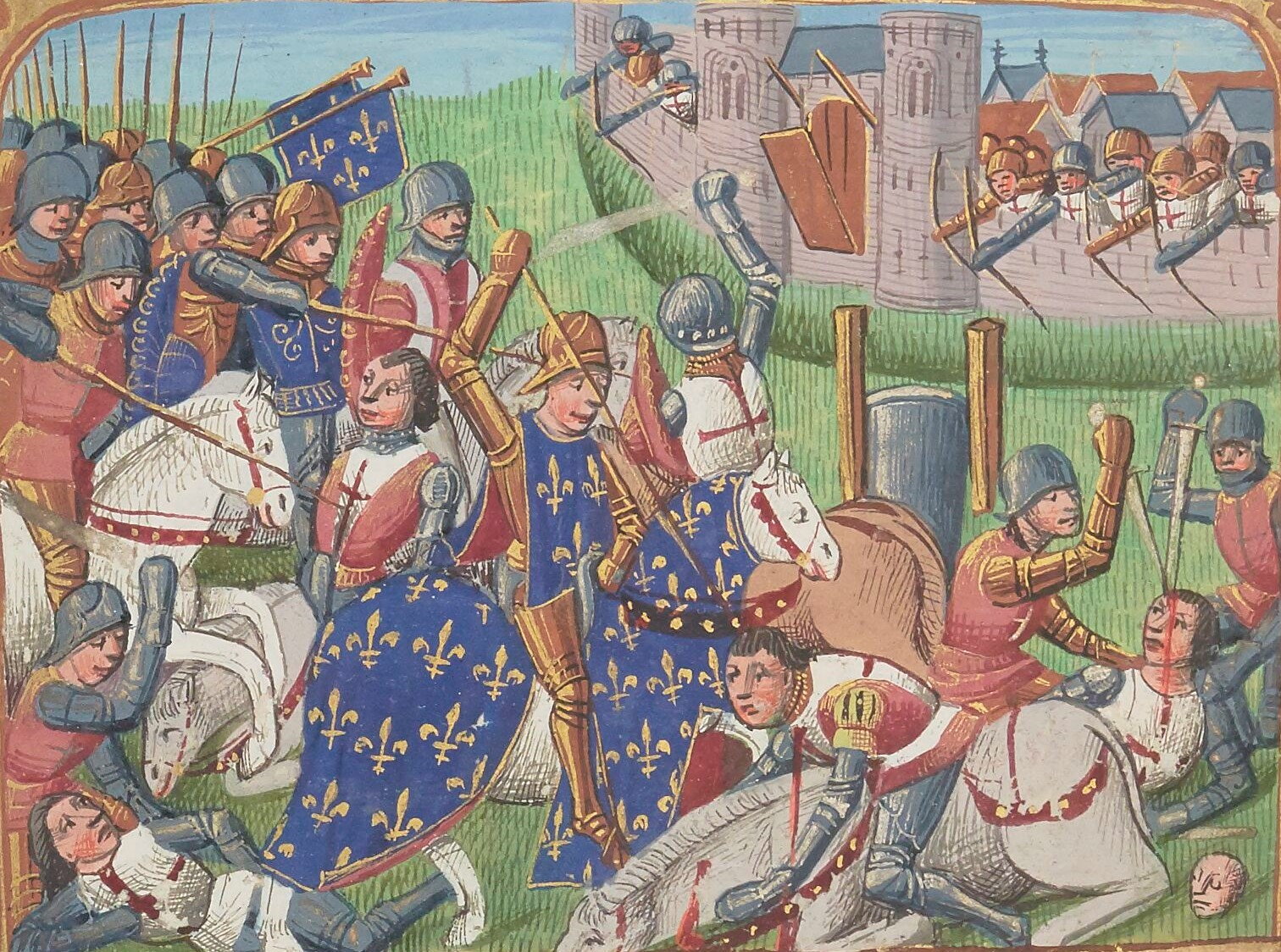
- Siege of Falaise, miniature from the Vigiles du roi Charles VII by Martial d'Auvergne, c. 1484
Date	6 July – 21 July 1450
Location	Falaise, Normandy
Result	French victory. Falaise surrenders

Belligerents
Kingdom of England	Kingdom of France

Commanders and leaders
Osbert Mundeford (surrendered); Andrew Trollope (surrendered)	

The siege of Falaise took place in 1450 during the Hundred Years War when French forces laid siege to Falaise in the English-controlled Normandy following their decisive victory at the Battle of Formigny.
