= Hillbilly Highway (song) =

Single by Steve Earle

from the album Guitar Town
- B-side: "Down the Road"
- Released: March 22, 1986
- Genre: Country rock, rockabilly, honky-tonk
- Length: 3:38
- Label: MCA
- Songwriter(s): Steve Earle, Jimbeau Hinson
- Producer(s): Emory Gordy Jr., Tony Brown

Steve Earle singles chronology
"A Little Bit in Love" (1985)	"Hillbilly Highway" (1986)	"Guitar Town" (1986)

"Hillbilly Highway" is a song co-written and recorded by American singer-songwriter Steve Earle. It was released in March 1986 as the first single from the album Guitar Town. The song reached #37 on the Billboard Hot Country Singles & Tracks chart. The song was written by Earle and Jimbeau Hinson.

== Chart performance ==
Chart (1986)	Peak position
US Hot Country Songs (Billboard)	37
Canadian RPM Country Tracks	46
