= Paul Burch =

American musician

Paul Burch is an American musician, composer, author, and record producer based near the Natchez Trace.

== Discography ==
- Pan-American Flash (1996)
- Wire to Wire (1998)
- Blue Notes (2000)
- Last of my Kind (2001)
- Fool for Love (2003)
- East to West (2006)
- Still Your Man (2009)
- WPABallclub Record Club (2010) (Ltd. Ed. pressing)
- Words of Love (2011)
- Great Chicago Fire, with the Waco Brothers (2012)
- Fevers (2013)
- Meridian Rising (2016)
- Trovatore (Ltd. Ed. Pressing) (2018)
- Light Sensitive (2020)
- Origins of Departure (Ltd. Ed.) (2020)
- Cry Love (2025)

== Works ==
Meridian Rising-A Novel, University of Georgia Press/New South Books 2025
