= Goodbye's All We've Got Left =

Single by Steve Earle

from the album Guitar Town
- B-side: "Good Ol' Boy Gettin' Tough
- Released: January 1987
- Length: 3:24
- Label: MCA
- Songwriter(s): Steve Earle
- Producer(s): Emory Gordy Jr., Tony Brown

Steve Earle singles chronology
"Someday" (1986)	"Goodbye's All We've Got Left" (1987)	"I Ain't Ever Satisfied" (1987)

"Goodbye's All We've Got Left" is a song written and recorded by American singer-songwriter Steve Earle. It was released in January 1987 as the fourth single from his 1986 album Guitar Town. The song reached number 8 on the Billboard Hot Country Singles & Tracks chart. The song is a melancholic reflection on a failing relationship, capturing the inevitability of a breakup.

== Chart performance ==
Chart (1987)	Peak position
US Hot Country Songs (Billboard)	8
Canadian RPM Country Tracks	10
