= Guitar Town (song) =

Single by Steve Earle

from the album Guitar Town
- B-side: ""Little Rock 'N' Roller"
- Released: June 2, 1986
- Genre: country rock, rockabilly
- Length: 2:33
- Label: MCA
- Songwriter: Steve Earle
- Producers: Emory Gordy Jr., Tony Brown

Steve Earle singles chronology
"Hillbilly Highway" (1986)	"Guitar Town" (1986)	"Someday" (1986)

Music video
- "Guitar Town" by Steve Earle on YouTube

"Guitar Town" is a song written and recorded by American singer-songwriter Steve Earle. It was released in June 1986 as the second single and title track from the album Guitar Town. The song reached number 7 on both the Billboard Hot Country Singles & Tracks chart and the Canadian RPM Country Tracks chart. It was Earle's highest-peaking song to date on the country charts in both the U.S. and Canada. The album version mentions a "Jap guitar", which the radio edit changes to "cheap guitar".

== Synopsis and production ==
The song is sung from the perspective of a touring musician traveling away from Nashville—"Guitar Town"—into Texas as he describes his experiences.

In the preproduction stages for the Guitar Town album, Earle and session guitarist Richard Bennett resolved that the song should omit a guitar solo, feeling it was—in light of the song's title—too predictable. Early takes of the song featured a small keyboard solo. Upon hearing them, producer Emory Gordy Jr. insisted on including a guitar solo. An argument ensued between Bennett and Gordy before Bennett retrieved a Danelectro Longhorn six string bass and played "the first thing that fell out of my brain". Bennett's solo was subsequently incorporated into the song.

== Critical reception ==
Kip Kirby, of Billboard magazine reviewed the song favorably, saying that Earle "revives the tremolo-laden guitar sound of the early '60s for this song about music and love on the road."

In 2024, Rolling Stone ranked the song at #146 on its 200 Greatest Country Songs of All Time ranking.

== Music video ==
The music video was directed by Gerry Wenner and premiered in mid-1986.

== Chart performance ==
Chart (1986)	Peak position
US Hot Country Songs (Billboard)	7
Canadian RPM Country Tracks	7
