= Nowhere Road (song) =

Single by Steve Earle

from the album Exit 0
- B-side: "I Ain't Ever Satisfied"
- Released: June 13, 1987
- Length: 2:50
- Label: MCA
- Songwriter(s): Steve Earle, Reno Kling
- Producer(s): Tony Brown, Emory Gordy Jr., Richard Bennett

Steve Earle singles chronology
"I Ain't Ever Satisfied" (1987)	"Nowhere Road" (1987)	"Sweet Little '66" (1987)

"Nowhere Road" is a song co-written and recorded by American singer-songwriter Steve Earle. It was released in June 1987 as the second single from the album Exit 0. The song reached number 20 on the Billboard Hot Country Singles & Tracks chart. Earle wrote this song with Reno Kling.

== Music video ==
The music video was directed by Jim Hershleder and premiered in mid-1987.

== Chart performance ==
Chart (1987)	Peak position
US Hot Country Songs (Billboard)	20
Canadian RPM Country Tracks	7

== Covers ==
"Nowhere Road" was recorded by Waylon Jennings and Willie Nelson for inclusion as a bonus track on the 20th anniversary reissue of their album Wanted! The Outlaws in 1996.
