= Devil's Right Hand =

Song by Steve Earle

"Devil's Right Hand" is a song written and originally recorded and released by Steve Earle. It first appeared on a single ("Squeeze Me In" / "Devil's Right Hand", 1983) and later on Earle's album Copperhead Road (1988).

The song has been covered by many artists, including Waylon Jennings (1986), the Highwaymen (1995) and Bob Seger (2014). Johnny Cash also recorded a solo version, released posthumously, in 2003 in the box set titled Unearthed.
