= Becky Buller =

American singer-songwriter

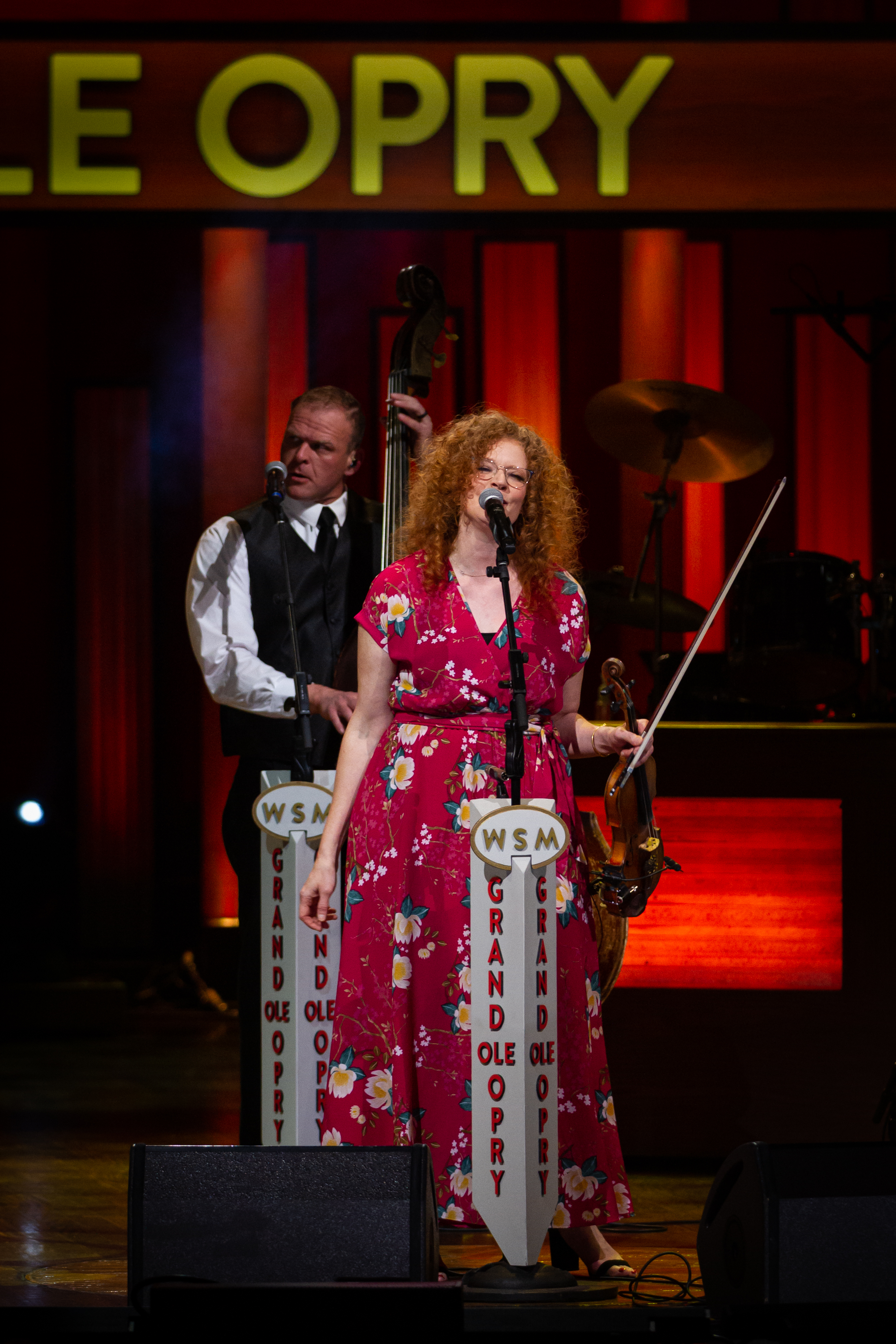
- Buller at the Grand Ole Opry in Nashville, Tennessee on April 30, 2022

Background information
- Born: January 31, 1979 (age 47); St. James, Minnesota, US
- Genres: Bluegrass, roots, Americana, folk
- Occupations: Multi-instrumentalist, singer-songwriter
- Instruments: Fiddle, clawhammer banjo, guitar, vocals
- Years active: 2000–present
- Labels: Dark Shadow Recording
- Website: beckybuller.com

Becky Buller (born January 31, 1979) is an American bluegrass and roots singer-songwriter and multi-instrumentalist most known for her songwriting and fiddling.

== Early life ==
Becky Buller was born January 31, 1979, in St. James, Minnesota. Buller grew up playing bluegrass music with her parents in a Southern Minnesota band called Prairie Grass. She began writing songs in middle school.

She studied classical violin with Patti Tryhus at the Mankato (Suzuki) School Of Music in Mankato, Minnesota, and Charles Gray at St. Olaf College. She served as concert master of the Mankato Area Youth Symphony in 1997. Buller was a percussionist throughout grade school, played bass in the jazz band, and sang in both concert and jazz choirs.

She studied bluegrass music and public relations at East Tennessee State University in Johnson City, graduating in 2001 with a communications degree.

== Career ==
Buller co-wrote “Freedom,” the lead-off track of The Infamous Stringdusters' Laws of Gravity (2018 Best Bluegrass Grammy), “The Shaker” on The Travelin’ McCoury’s self-titled release (2019 Best Bluegrass Grammy), and “Good-bye Girl” on Molly Tuttle & Golden Highway’s Crooked Tree album (2023 Best Bluegrass Grammy).

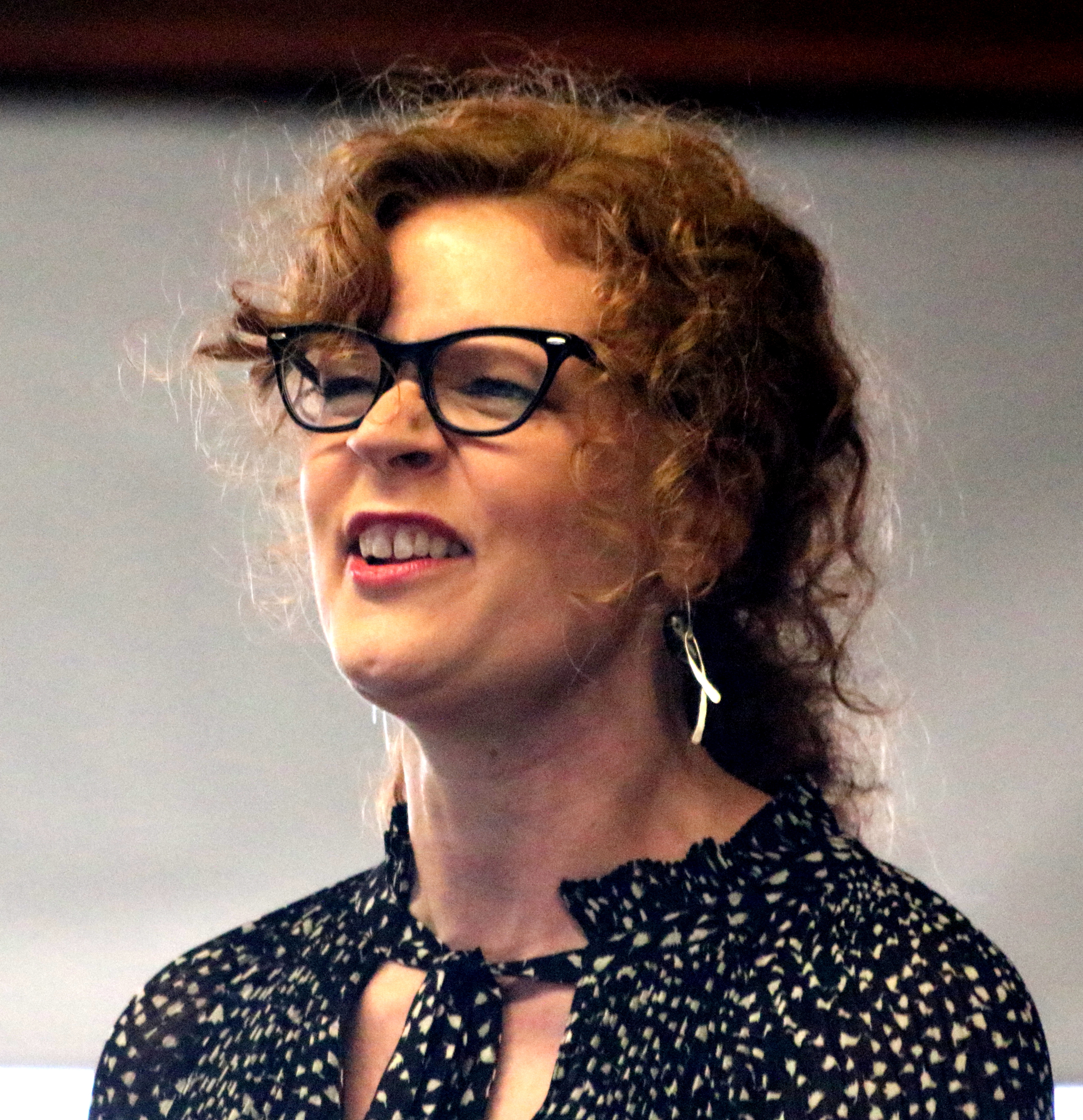
Buller performing at MerleFest in 2016. Photo by Forrest L. Smith, III (aka Filberthockey).

Buller is the recipient of 10 IBMA awards, including the 2016 Fiddler and Female Vocalist. She is the first woman to receive the Fiddler nod; she is also the first person to win in both vocal and instrumental categories. Her other awards include the 2020 Collaborative Recording for “The Barber’s Fiddle” and the 2020 Song for co-writing and fiddling on Special Consensus’ “Chicago Barn Dance.”

She has made guest appearances on WSM’s Grand Ole Opry and tours with the Becky Buller Band. Distance And Time, her third album for the Dark Shadow Recording label, was a nominee for the 2021 IBMA Album award. Her first Christmas collection, The Perfect Gift, released during the 2022 holiday season.

In April 2023, Buller was inducted into the Minnesota Music Hall of Fame.

She moonlights with the First Ladies Of Bluegrass, an all-female super group composed of the first women to win in their respective instrumental categories at the IBMA awards: Alison Brown (banjo), Missy Raines (bass), Sierra Hull (mandolin), Becky (fiddle), and Molly Tuttle (guitar).

Buller serves on the board of the IBMA Foundation, which awards $50,000 annually in scholarships and grants to spread the word about bluegrass music and support those who create it. Buller also serves on the board of the East Tennessee State University Alumni Association.

== Band ==
The Becky Buller Band

- Becky Buller - vocals, fiddle
- Jacob Groopman - guitar
- Daniel Hardin - bass
- Wesley Lee - mandolin
- Ned Luberecki - banjo

First Ladies of Bluegrass
Buller is also a member of the First Ladies of Bluegrass, a supergroup featuring the first women to win the IBMA Award in each respective instrumental category. Buller won the Fiddle Player of the Year award in 2016.

- Alison Brown - banjo, vocals
- Becky Buller - fiddle, vocals
- Sierra Hull - mandolin, vocals
- Missy Raines - bass, vocals
- Molly Tuttle - guitar, vocals

== Personal life ==
Buller lives in Manchester, Tennessee, with her husband and daughter.

== Discography ==
Title	Details	Peak chart positions
Title	Details	US Grass
Rest My Weary Feet	Release date: 2000; Label: SRS Records; Format: CD	
Little Bird	Release date: July 27, 2004; Label: Bell Buckle; Formats: CD, digital download, streaming	
Here's a Little Song (with Valerie Smith)	Release date: September 9, 2008; Label: Bell Buckle; Formats: CD	
Tween Earth and Sky	Release date: November 11, 2014; Label: CD Baby; Formats: CD, music download	
Crêpe Paper Heart	Release date: February 1, 2018; Label: Dark Shadow Recording; Formats: CD, music download, streaming	
Distance and Time	Release date: October 30, 2020; Label: Dark Shadow Recording; Formats: CD, music download, streaming	
The Perfect Gift	Release Date: December 1, 2022; Label: Dark Shadow Recording; Formats: CD, music download, streaming	
Jubilee	Release Date: May 17, 2024; Label: Dark Shadow Recording; Formats: CD, music download, streaming, vinyl	

== Songwriting credits ==
Credits taken from Buller's official website.

Artist	Year	Song	Co-writers
Alan Bibey and Grasstowne	2018	"New Life"	
The Bankesters	2012	"Our Song (I'm in Love with You)"	
The Bankesters	2012	"The Captain"	
The Bankesters	2013	"Rise Up"	Rick Lang
Blue Moon Rising	2010	"Ain't No Way"	Jeff Hyde
The Churchmen	2013	"In the Twinklin' of an Eye"	
The Churchmen	2013	"Mercy Road"	Jerry Salley
The Churchmen	2015	"Harbor in the Sky"	Steven Mougin
The Churchmen	2015	"For Thine"	Kevin Elias
Dan Boner	2020	"Raven Tresses"	
Darin and Brooke Alrdidge	2013	"Love, Speak to Me"	Jeff Hyde, Jimmy Fortune
Darin and Brooke Alrdidge	2013	"Laurie Stevens"	Bethany Dick-Olds
Darin and Brooke Alrdidge	2013	"Higher Than My Heart"	Sarah Majors
Dave Adkins	2014	"Tennessee Twister"	Nancy Cardwell
Doyle Lawson and Quicksilver	2001	"Be Living"	
Infamous Stringdusters	2017	"Freedom"	Jeremy Garrett
Joe Mullins	2012	"Moses"	
Kenny Smith & Amanda Smith	2004	"Without a Trace"	Alan Bartram
Kenny Smith & Amanda Smith	2004	"Why Don't You Just Say Good-Bye"	
Kenny Smith & Amanda Smith	2005	"Why Do You Do What You Do"	
Kristi Stanley	2018	"Raven Tresses"	
Lisa Aschmann	2012	"(There Is No Such Thing As An) Ordinary Day"	Lisa Aschmann
Lisa Aschmann	2012	"(Handy Dandy) Pocket Solar Calculator"	Lisa Aschmann
Mark Newton	2001	"Charlie Lawson's Still"	Tommy Austin
Mark Newton	2003	"Cabin in the Trees"	
Nu-Blu	2012	"Martha & Mary"	Nancy Cardwell
Rhonda Vincent	2003	"Fishers of Men"	
Ricky Skaggs	2013	"Music to My Ears"	Lisa Aschmann, Mark Simos
Russell Moore and IIIrd Tyme Out	2004	"Rest My Weary Feet"	
Russell Moore and IIIrd Tyme Out	2009	"My Angeline"	
Russell Moore and IIIrd Tyme Out	2019	"Barefoot Girl"	Louisa Branscomb
The Special Consensus	2009	"Gone to Carolina"	Justin Carbone
The Special Consensus	2012	"Scratch Gravel Road"	
The Special Consensus	2018	"She Took The Tennessee River"	Jon Weisberger
The Special Consensus	2020	"Chicago Barn Dance"	Alison Brown, Missy Raines
Stephen Mougin	2020	"Railroad Man"	Stephen Mougin
Valerie Smith	2005	"In Those Mines"	
Valerie Smith	2005	"Heaven Is Waiting"	
Valerie Smith	2007	"The Rain"	
Valerie Smith	2011	"Blame It on the Bluegrass"	Elizabeth Shrum
Valerie Smith	2011	"A Good Day, Lord"	Jeff Hyde
Volume Five	2018	"North Dakota"	Craig Market
The Whites	2018	"Dont Tune Him Out, Tune Him In"	Rick Lang
Molly Tuttle	2022	"Goodbye Girl"	Molly Tuttle
The Travelin' McCourys	2018	"The Shaker"	Alan Bartram

== Awards and nominations ==
Year	Association	Category	Nominated work	Result	Ref
1996	Minnesota State Old Time Fiddle Championships	Junior Division		Won	
2001	MerleFest Chris Austin Songwriting Contest	Bluegrass Song	"How I Love You"	Won	
2006	International Bluegrass Music Awards	Recorded Event of the Year	"Back to the Well"	Won	
2015	International Bluegrass Music Awards	Recorded Event of the Year	"Southern Flavor"	Won	
2015	International Bluegrass Music Awards	Songwriter of the Year	Becky Buller	Won	
2015	International Bluegrass Music Awards	Emerging Artist of the Year	Becky Buller	Won	
2016	International Bluegrass Music Awards	Fiddle Player of the Year	Becky Buller	Won	
2016	International Bluegrass Music Awards	Female Vocalist of the Year	Becky Buller	Won	
2018	International Bluegrass Music Awards	Recorded Event of the Year	"Swept Away"	Won	
2018	International Bluegrass Music Awards	Gospel Recorded Performance of the Year	"Speakin' to That Mountain"	Won	
2020	International Bluegrass Music Awards	Song of the Year	"Chicago Barn Dance"	Won	
2020	International Bluegrass Music Awards	Collaborative Recording of the Year	The Barber's Fiddle	Won	
