= Fork in the Road (The Infamous Stringdusters album) =

Fork In The Road

Studio album by The Infamous Stringdusters
- Released: February 13, 2007
- Genre: Country
- Length: 49:00
- Label: Sugar Hill Records

The Infamous Stringdusters chronology
Fork In The Road (2007)	The Infamous Stringdusters (2008)

Fork in the Road is the debut studio album by The Infamous Stringdusters released on Sugar Hill Records. The title track won Song of the Year at the 2007 International Bluegrass Music Awards. The album also won the Album of the Year at the 2007 International Bluegrass Music Awards.

== Track listing ==
No.	Title	Length
1	No More To Leave You Behind	4:05
2	Fork In The Road	3:53
3	Starry Night	3:19
4	3 X 5	4:47
5	40 West	4:01
6	Tragic Life	4:28
7	Poor Boy's Delight	4:08
8	No Resolution	4:48
9	My Destination	3:08
10	Letter From Prison	3:16
11	Dream You Back	2:32
12	Moon Man	7:20

== Personnel ==
- Tim Stafford - Producer
- Randy LeRoy - Mastering
- Patrick Murphy, Dave Sinko, & Tony Smith- Engineers
- Geoff Bartley, Johnny Cobb, Benny Galloway, Glen Garrett, & John Pennell - Composers
- Alan Bartram - Bass, Producer
- Travis Book - Bass, Vocals, Producer
- Jesse Cobb - Mandolin, Producer
- Jeremy Garrett - Fiddle, Vocals, Producer, Composer
- Andy Hall - Dobro, Vocals, Producer, Composer
