= Sister Sadie (band) =

American bluegrass, country and folk band

- Origin: Nashville, Tennessee
- Genres: Bluegrass, country, folk
- Years active: 2012-present
- Labels: Pinecastle Records, Mountain Home Music Company
- Members: Deanie Richardson; Gena Britt; Jaelee Roberts; Dani Flowers; Rainy Miatke; Katie Blomarz-Kimball
- Past members: Dale Ann Bradley; Tina Adair; Beth Lawrence; Hasee Ciaccio; Mary Meyer; Maddie Dalton
- Website: sistersadieband.com

Sister Sadie is an all-female American bluegrass, country, and folk band that formed in Nashville, Tennessee in 2012. The band formed after the five original members Deanie Richardson, Tina Adair, Dale Ann Bradley, Gena Britt, and Beth Lawrence came together to play one show at the Station Inn in Nashville. They continued to play together as a band, eventually touring and releasing music. Since 2020, they have gone through a few lineup changes and the current band consists of: Deanie Richardson, Gena Britt, Jaelee Roberts, Dani Flowers, Rainy Miatke, and Katie Blomarz-Kimball .

They have released four full-length albums as a group: Sister Sadie (2016), Sister Sadie II (2018), No Fear (2024), and All Will Be Well (2025), earning two Grammy Award for Best Bluegrass Album nominations. The group won IBMA Vocal Group of the Year for three consecutive years in 2019, 2020, and 2021 and IBMA Entertainer of the Year in 2020, making them the first all-female group to win that award. Deanie Richardson has also won two Fiddle Player of the Year awards in 2020 and 2024, and Jaelee Roberts received the Female Vocalist of the Year award in 2024.

== History ==
=== Background (2012–2015) ===
Sister Sadie played together for the first time in December 2012 at the Station Inn in Nashville for what was supposed to be one night only. Longtime friends Deanie Richardson, Tina Adair, Dale Ann Bradley, Gena Britt, and Beth Lawrence were already established musicians and members of the bluegrass scene with their own musical projects. Richardson is a fiddler who has played with Bob Seger, the Chieftains, Vince Gill, & Patty Loveless. Vocalist and mandolin player Adair has fronted her family band The Adairs for over 20 years and signed her first record deal when she was 17. Britt is a banjo player who was a founding member of The Daughters of Bluegrass and has been a part of the bands New Vintage, Alecia Nugent, Petticoat Junction, Lou Reid & Carolina, and Alan Bibey & Grasstowne, as well as in her own band The Gena Britt Band. Bassist Lawrence played with the Stevens Sisters, Mark Newton, Alecia Nugent, and in Britt’s band. Singer and guitarist Dale Ann Bradley is a five-time IBMA “Female Vocalist of the Year” winner as well as a member of the Kentucky Hall of Fame. Together, the five friends formed the “supergroup”. Richardson said, “We’ve known each other our whole lives, and it was just a magical thing from the first downbeat at rehearsal, before we even went up there.”

After their first gig, the group received calls to play more shows and eventually decided to come together as a band, albeit a side project. The idea was to get together and play music whenever they had time and let things develop naturally. The name of the band “Sister Sadie” was inspired by the Tony Rice song “Little Sadie” as well as by the fact that the members felt like sisters.

=== Sister Sadie (2016–2017) ===
On June 3, 2016 the band released their debut self-titled album Sister Sadie on Pinecastle Records. It reached #4 on the Billboard Bluegrass Album charts. The twelve-song album consists of a combination of covers and originals, with four of the five members taking turns singing lead on the tracks. It received positive reviews. The single “Unholy Water” was written by Richardson and Bill Tennyson and is sung by Bradley from the perspective of a jug of moonshine.

=== Sister Sadie II (2018–2022) ===
In June 2018 Sister Sadie released the first single from their new album called “Losing You Blues”, which debuted at #14 on the Bluegrass Today Airplay charts. The song was penned years earlier by Adair and her bandmate at the time, Doug Bartlett.

A month later, on August 24, 2018 the group released their second full-length album on Pinecastle Records, Sister Sadie II. This time the album reached #2 on the Billboard Bluegrass Album charts. Like their first album, Sister Sadie II is made up of originals and reworked covers. The songs vary in style from country to bluegrass and feature Sister Sadie’s trademark three-part harmonies. One of the cover songs on the album is a traditional folk song called “900 Miles”, which has been recorded by various artists. Sister Sadie’s version is inspired by Odetta's take on the song. It was arranged by Richardson and features her fiddle playing and three-part vocals from Adair, Britt, and Bradley. The music video for “900 Miles” features footage of the band performing in an all-black room interspersed with footage of a train barreling down the tracks. It was directed by Jon Roncolato and shot on a sound stage at Belmont University in Nashville.

In 2019, Sister Sadie was nominated for a Grammy for Best Bluegrass Album for Sister Sadie II and they won IBMA Vocal Group of the Year. That spring, they made their debut at the Grand Ole Opry and received a standing ovation when they performed “900 Miles.” In March 2019, Lawrence departed the band and Hasee Ciaccio became on-call bassist.

On October 1 the following year, Sister Sadie became the first all-female band to win IBMA Entertainer of the Year. Richardson told NPR “In bluegrass music, there’s not the big light show and the jumping around. We’re singing about, you know, lying and cheating and murder and love and babies. So I feel like the Entertainer Award is about how you, as a band, are reaching out to that audience. And for us, we’re five women up there who work hard and who live the songs we sing and play from the depths of our guts. And I think that comes across.”

They also won IBMA Vocal Group of the Year and Richardson took the award for Fiddle Player of the Year, becoming the second woman in 30 years to win it. That same year, Bradley won the SPBGMA award for Female Vocalist of the Year. On December 5, 2020 they played the Grand Ole Opry again.

=== Changes for the band (2021–2022) ===
After eight years in Sister Sadie, founding member Bradley left the group in 2020 to pursue her solo career. At that point Jaelee Roberts (guitar & vocals) joined the group. Roberts had grown up watching the women of Sister Sadie. Richardson played in the band New Tradition with Roberts' dad and Britt played in the band Petticoat Junction with her mom. According to Roberts, she was “flabbergasted” when she was asked to audition for Sister Sadie because “These are all my heroes playing together in a band. And I had grown up around them. It was such a surreal feeling to get to audition”. Ciaccio had been touring with the band for two years prior, but in 2021 they asked her to become a full-fledged member.

That spring Sister Sadie was featured in the Country Music Hall of Fame & Museum’s “American Currents: State of the Music” exhibit which ran from March 12, 2021 to February 6, 2022. Sister Sadie’s display contained instruments from each of the band members, posters, set lists, and other mementos.

In October 2021, another founding member, Adair, decided to step away from the band to focus on solo work. She was replaced by vocalist & mandolin player Mary Meyer, who joined in January 2022.

In 2022, Britt won the SPBGMA award for Banjo Player of the Year. The band also made the decision to move from Pinecastle Records and sign with Mountain Home Music Company.

On October 4, they released their first single off their upcoming album called “Diane”. “Diane” was originally written and released by country pop singer Cam in 2017. Richardson heard Cam perform the song at the Grand Ole Opry while she was playing in the house band and she liked it so much that she decided to bring it to Sister Sadie. The song is a rebuttal to Dolly Parton's “Jolene”. Roberts takes the lead on Sister Sadie’s version while Britt and Meyer provide the backing vocals.

That same month, Meyer departed the band and Dani Flowers joined on guitar and vocals.

=== No Fear (2023–present) ===
In 2023, Ciaccio departed and the group was joined by bassist Maddie Dalton. For Dalton, working on the latest Sister Sadie album was her first experience playing the bass in a professional setting. Flowers was a longtime friend of the band and said that joining “a band full of women that I already love was a great way to get back into playing music” after taking time off from music to focus on family. Dalton won the 2023 IBMA Momentum Award for Instrumentalist of the Year and Roberts was recognized as the SPBGMA Female Vocalist of the Year.

On March 8, 2023 the band released the bluegrass break up song “Well”, before releasing another single called “Willow” on August 24. “Willow” was co-written by Ashley McBryde and features guest performers Tristan Scroggins on mandolin, Seth Taylor on guitar, and Tony Creasman on drums. McBryde said that Sister Sadie was the “best thing to ever happen to” the song. In October, the band released a music video for “Willow." At the beginning of the next year, they released another single called “Cannonball”. “Cannonball” is a mid-tempo bluegrass song that was written a decade earlier by Flowers and Paul Sikes. This song debuted at #1 on the Bluegrass Today Airplay Chart.

On January 26, 2024, Sister Sadie’s third album No Fear came out on Mountain Home Music Company. The album is a mix of bluegrass, traditional country, and folk with some pop and rock thrown in. It also contains electric guitar, piano, drums, and a B-3 organ while still showcasing the three-part harmonies Sister Sadie has come to be known for. The Bluegrass Situation described the album as combining “the high lonesome sound of bluegrass with a blend of country and pop sensibilities a la The Chicks, Little Big Town, or Pistol Annies." Referring to the new album, Richardson said that they didn’t go into the project with one genre in mind and that “there’s a space for bluegrass meets Americana meets country meets pop—that’s what I’m manifesting”. The project includes a cover of "Diane", a 2017 song by country artist Cam.

New member Rainy Miatke joined the group on vocals and mandolin in December 2024. Dalton left the group in March 2025 to focus on her own career.

== Musical style and legacy ==
Sister Sadie is generally considered a bluegrass band but their music doesn’t necessarily stick to one genre. Richardson says that their “dream” is for “someone to not try to label or pigeonhole” their music. She said that they don’t go into the studio with a specific genre in mind, they just try to write good songs. Flowers said that they do what “serves the song” versus trying to put the songs into a box that they may not fit into.

Each member of Sister Sadie is a songwriter and they all contribute to writing, arranging, playing, and singing the songs on their albums. According to Richardson, every time a new member joins the band “It changes the vibe. It changes the feel. It changes the vocals. It changes everything”.

Britt says they never planned on being an all-female band, “we kind of just got together as friends and as something fun, but when we did it clicked, and we thought ‘this is pretty cool.’ The band evolved from that. I want us all to be respected for our musicality, musicianship, and vocals, regardless of whether we’re male or female." Richardson, who is a gay woman, says she has never had an issue and that she doesn’t feel like “being women has really hindered us…We’ve got a great career. For me and us, I don’t feel like it’s ever been an issue. I know it has been for lots of people, but we just try to stay positive and give it hell and see what happens."

== Band members ==
=== Current members ===
- Deanie Richardson – fiddle (2012-current)
- Gena Britt – banjo, vocals (2012-current)
- Jaelee Roberts – guitar, vocals (2020-current)
- Dani Flowers – guitar, vocals (2022-current)
- Rainey Miatke – mandolin, vocals (2024-current)
- Katie Blomarz-Kimball - Bass (2025-current)

=== Former members ===
- Dale Ann Bradley – guitar & vocals (2012-2020)
- Tina Adair – mandolin, vocals (2012-2021)
- Beth Lawrence – bass (2012-2019)
- Hasee Ciaccio – bass (2019-2023)
- Mary Meyer – mandolin, vocals (2021-2022)
- Maddie Dalton – bass, vocals (2023-2025)

== Discography ==
Title	Details	Peak chart positions
Title	Details	US Grass
Sister Sadie	Release date: June 3, 2016; Label: Pinecastle Records; Formats: CD, music download, streaming	4
Sister Sadie II	Release date: August 24, 2018; Label: Pinecastle Records; Formats: CD, music download, streaming	2
No Fear	Release date: January 26, 2024; Label: Mountain Home Music; Formats: CD, music download, streaming	—
All Will Be Well	Release date: June 27, 2025; Label: Mountain Home Music; Formats: CD, music download, streaming	—
"—" denotes releases that did not chart

== Awards and nominations ==
=== Grammy Awards ===
The Grammy Awards are presented annually by the National Academy of Recording Arts and Sciences of the United States for outstanding achievements in the music industry. The awards were established in 1958. Sister Sadie have two nominations.

Year	Nominee / work	Award	Result	Ref
2019	Sister Sadie II	Best Bluegrass Album	Nominated	
2025	No Fear	Best Bluegrass Album	Nominated	

=== IBMA Awards ===
The International Bluegrass Music Awards are presented annually by the International Bluegrass Music Association of the United States for achievements in the bluegrass field. The awards were established in 1990. Sister Sadie have seven wins.

Year	Nominee / work	Award	Result	Ref
2017	Sister Sadie	Emerging Artist of the Year	Nominated	
2018	Sister Sadie	Emerging Artist of the Year	Nominated	
2019	Sister Sadie II	Album of the Year	Nominated	
2019	Sister Sadie	Vocal Group of the Year	Won	
2020	Sister Sadie	Entertainer of the Year	Won	
2020	Dale Ann Bradley	Female Vocalist of the Year	Nominated	
2020	Deanie Richardson	Fiddle Player of the Year	Won	
2020	Gena Britt	Banjo Player of the Year	Nominated	
2020	Sister Sadie	Vocal Group of the Year	Won	
2021	Sister Sadie	Vocal Group of the Year	Won	
2021	Deanie Richardson	Fiddle Player of the Year	Nominated	
2021	Gena Britt	Banjo Player of the Year	Nominated	
2022	Gena Britt	Banjo Player of the Year	Nominated	
2022	Jaelee Roberts	Female Vocalist of the Year	Nominated	
2022	Deanie Richardson	Fiddle Player of the Year	Nominated	
2022	Sister Sadie	Vocal Group of the Year	Nominated	
2022	Sister Sadie	Entertainer of the Year	Nominated	
2023	"Diane"	Song of the Year	Nominated	
2023	Jaelee Roberts	Female Vocalist of the Year	Nominated	
2023	Deanie Richardson	Fiddle Player of the Year	Nominated	
2023	Sister Sadie	Vocal Group of the Year	Nominated	
2024	Sister Sadie	Vocal Group of the Year	Nominated	
2024	Sister Sadie	Entertainer of the Year	Nominated	
2024	Jaelee Roberts	Female Vocalist of the Year	Won	
2024	Deanie Robertson	Fiddle Player of the Year	Won	
2024	Gena Britt	Banjo Player of the Year	Nominated	
2024	No Fear	Album of the Year	Nominated	
2024	"Willow"	Song of the Year	Nominated	
2024	"Willow"	Music Video of the Year	Nominated	
