= International Bluegrass Music Awards =

Music award

- Awarded for: Achievements in Bluegrass music
- Presented by: IBMA
- First award: 1990
- Website: official website

The International Bluegrass Music Awards is an award show for bluegrass music presented by the International Bluegrass Music Association (IBMA). Awards are voted based on professional membership in the IBMA.

== Award winners ==
=== 2025 award winners ===
==== Recording awards ====
Category	Winner	Work	Songwriters
Album of the Year	Jason Carter & Michael Cleveland	Carter & Cleveland	
Collaborative Recording of the Year	Jason Carter & Michael Cleveland, Jaelee Roberts, Vince Gill	“Outrun the Rain”	Terry Herd, Jimmy Yeary
Gospel Recording of the Year	Jaelee Roberts	“He’s Gone”	Kelsi Harrigill
Instrumental Recording of the Year	Kristin Scott Benson, Gena Britt, Alison Brown	“Ralph’s Banjo Special”	Ralph Stanley
Music Video of the Year	The Kody Norris Show	“The Auctioneer”	
Song of the Year	Jason Carter & Michael Cleveland, Jaelee Roberts, Vince Gill	“Outrun the Rain”	Terry Herd, Jimmy Yeary

Source: IBMA website

==== Musician awards ====
- Banjo Player of the Year: Kristin Scott Benson
- Bass Player of the Year: Vickie Vaughn
- Entertainer of the Year: Billy Strings
- Female Vocalist of the Year: Alison Krauss
- Fiddle Player of the Year: Maddie Denton
- Guitar Player of the Year: Trey Hensley
- Instrumental Group of the Year: The Travelin' McCourys
- Male Vocalist of the Year: Greg Blake
- Mandolin Player of the Year: Sierra Hull
- Resophonic Guitar Player of the Year: Justin Moses
- Vocal Group of the Year: Authentic Unlimited
- New Artist of the Year: Red Camel Collective

source: IBMA website

==== Industry awards ====
- Broadcaster of the Year: Daniel Mullins (Industrial Strength Bluegrass - Southwestern's Ohio Musical Legacy)
- Event of the Year: Earl Scruggs Music Festival (Mill Spring, North Carolina))
- Graphic Designer of the Year: Gina Dilg
- Liner Notes of the Year: Neil V. Rosenberg (Earl Jam – Tony Trischka)
- Photographer of the Year: Madison Thorn
- Writer of the Year: Dan Miller
- Sound Engineer of the Year: Stephen Mougin
- Songwriter of the Year: Jon Weisberger

source: IBMA website

==== Momentum Awards ====
- Ali Vance - Vocalist of the Year
- Rick Lang - Mentor of the Year
- Kyser George - Instrumentalist of the Year
- Rainy Miatke - Instrumentalist of the Year
- Austin Scelzo - Industry Involvement
- Mountain Grass Unit - Band of the Year

Source: IBMA website

=== 2024 award winners ===
==== Recording awards ====
Category	Winner	Work	Songwriters
Album of the Year	Molly Tuttle & Golden Highway	City of Gold	
Collaborative Recording of the Year	Tony Trischka with Billy Strings	"Brown's Ferry Blues"	Alton & Rabon Delmore
Gospel Recorded Performance of the Year	Dale Ann Bradley	"God Already Has"	Mark “Brink” Brinkman & David Stewart
Instrumental Recorded Performance of the Year	Ashby Frank	"Knee Deep in Bluegrass"	Terry Baucom
Music Video of the Year	Special Consensus with Ray Legere, John Reischman, Patrick Sauber, Trisha Gagnon, Pharis & Jason Romero, and Claire Lynch	"Alberta Bound"	
Music Video of the Year	Authentic Unlimited	"Fall in Tennessee"	
Song of the Year	Authentic Unlimited	"Fall in Tennessee"	John Meador & Bob Minner

Source: IBMA website

==== Musician awards ====
- Banjo Player of the Year: Rob McCoury
- Bass Player of the Year: Vickie Vaughn
- Entertainer of the Year: The Del McCoury Band
- Female Vocalist of the Year: Jaelee Roberts
- Fiddle Player of the Year: Deanie Richardson
- Guitar Player of the Year: Cody Kilby
- Instrumental Group of the Year: The Travelin' McCourys
- Male Vocalist of the Year: Danny Paisley
- Mandolin Player of the Year: Jesse Brock
- Resophonic Guitar Player of the Year: Gaven Largent
- Vocal Group of the Year: Authentic Unlimited
- New Artist of the Year: East Nash Grass

Source: IBMA website

==== Industry awards ====
- Broadcaster of the Year: Cindy Baucom
- Event of the Year: Industrial Strength Bluegrass Festival (Wilmington, Ohio)
- Graphic Designer of the Year: Grace van't Hof
- Liner Notes of the Year: Daniel Mullins (Industrial Strength Bluegrass - Southwestern's Ohio Musical Legacy)
- Photographer of the Year: Jeromie Stephens
- Writer of the Year: Craig Havighurst
- Sound Engineer of the Year: Ben Surratt
- Songwriter of the Year: Rick Faris

==== Momentum Awards ====
- Heather Berry Mabe - Vocalist of the Year
- Tony Watt - Mentor of the Year
- Gibson Davis - Instrumentalist of the Year
- Wyatt Ellis - Instrumentalist of the Year
- Katie Kirchner - Industry Involvement
- DownRiver Collective - Band of the Year

==== Distinguished Achievement Award ====
- Laurie Lewis
- Richard Hurst
- ArtistWorks
- Bloomin' Bluegrass Festival
- Cindy Baucom

=== 2023 award winners ===
==== Recording awards ====
Category	Winner	Work	Songwriters
Album of the Year	Molly Tuttle & Golden Highway	Crooked Tree	
Collaborative Recording of the Year	Special Consensus with Patrick Sauber, Ray Legere, John Reischman, Trisha Gagnon, Claire Lynch, Pharis & Jason Romero	"Alberta Bound"	
Gospel Recorded Performance of the Year	Larry Sparks	"The Scarlet Red Lines"	
Instrumental Recorded Performance of the Year	Jason Carter	"Kissimmee Kid"	
Song of the Year	Molly Tuttle & Golden Highway	"Crooked Tree"	Molly Tuttle/Melody Walker

==== Musician awards ====
- Banjo Player of the Year: Kristin Scott Benson
- Bass Player of the Year: Vickie Vaughn
- Entertainer of the Year: Billy Strings
- Female Vocalist of the Year: Molly Tuttle
- Fiddle Player of the Year: Jason Carter
- Guitar Player of the Year: Trey Hensley
- Instrumental Group of the Year: The Travelin' McCourys
- Male Vocalist of the Year: Greg Blake
- Mandolin Player of the Year: Sierra Hull
- New Artist of the Year: Authentic Unlimited
- Resophonic Guitar Player of the Year: Justin Moses
- Vocal Group of the Year: Authentic Unlimited

==== Industry awards ====
- Broadcaster of the Year: Ned Luberecki (SiriusXM)
- Event of the Year: Blue Highway Fest (Big Stone Gap, Virginia)
- Graphic Designer of the Year: Grace van’t Hof
- Liner Notes of the Year: Sam Bush and Jon Weisberger (Radio John: The Songs of John Hartford)
- Songwriter of the Year: Tim Stafford
- Sound Engineer of the Year: Steve Chandler
- Writer of the Year: Chris Jones

==== Momentum Awards ====
- Crying Uncle Bluegrass Band - Band of the Year
- Carley Arrowood-Thrailkill - Vocalist of the Year
- Gaven Largent - Instrumentalist of the Year
- Maddie Dalton - Instrumentalist of the Year
- Dan Boner - Mentor of the Year
- Matt Hutchinson - Industry Involvement

==== Distinguished Achievement Award ====
- Red Wine
- Carl Goldstein
- Tom Ewing
- Terry Baucom
- The Bluegrass Situation

==== Hall of Fame Inductees ====
- David Grisman
- Wilma Lee Cooper
- Sam Bush

=== 2022 award winners ===
==== Recording awards ====
Category	Winner	Work	Songwriters
Album of the Year	Béla Fleck	My Bluegrass Heart	
Collaborative Recording of the Year	Dolly Parton with Carl Jackson, Larry Cordle, Bradley Walker and Jerry Salley	"In the Sweet By and By"	
Gospel Recorded Performance of the Year	Dolly Parton with Carl Jackson, Larry Cordle, Bradley Walker and Jerry Salley	"In the Sweet By and By"	
Instrumental Recorded Performance of the Year	Béla Fleck featuring Sam Bush, Stuart Duncan, Edgar Meyer, and Bryan Sutton	"Vertigo"	
Song of the Year	Billy Strings	"Red Daisy"	Jarrod Walker, Christian Ward

==== Musician awards ====
- Banjo Player of the Year: Béla Fleck
- Bass Player of the Year: Jason Moore
- Entertainer of the Year: Billy Strings
- Female Vocalist of the Year: Molly Tuttle
- Fiddle Player of the Year: Bronwyn Keith-Hynes
- Guitar Player of the Year: Cody Kilby
- Instrumental Group of the Year: Béla Fleck My Bluegrass Heart
- Male Vocalist of the Year: Del McCoury
- Mandolin Player of the Year: Sierra Hull
- New Artist of the Year: Rick Faris
- Resophonic Guitar Player of the Year: Justin Moses
- Vocal Group of the Year: Doyle Lawson & Quicksilver

==== Industry awards ====
- Broadcaster of the Year: Chris Jones (SiriusXM)
- Event of the Year: Industrial Strength Bluegrass Festival (Wilmington, Ohio)
- Graphic Designer of the Year: Grace van’t Hof
- Liner Notes of the Year: Ted Olson (Doc Watson - Life's Work: A Retrospective)
- Songwriter of the Year: Ronnie Bowman
- Sound Engineer of the Year: Steve Chandler
- Writer of the Year: Akira Otsuka

==== Momentum Awards ====
- Full Cord - Band of the Year
- Rebekka Nilsson - Vocalist of the Year
- Harry Clark - Instrumentalist of the Year
- George Jackson - Instrumentalist of the Year
- Kimber Ludiker - Mentor
- Lillian Werbin - Momentum Industry Involvement of the Year

==== Distinguished Achievement Award ====
- Peghead Nation
- Nitty Gritty Dirt Band (In celebration of the 50th anniversary of the Will The Circle Be Unbroken album)
- Steve Huber
- The FreshGrass Foundation
- Dan Crary

==== Hall of Fame Inductees ====
- Peter Rowan
- Paul "Moon" Mullins
- Norman Blake

=== 2021 award winners ===
The awards ceremony was held September 30 at the Duke Energy Center for the Performing Arts in Raleigh, North Carolina. The inductees into the International Bluegrass Music Hall of Fame were recognized during the awards. These included Alison Krauss, Lynn Morris, and The Stoneman Family.

- Album of the Year -- Industrial Strength Bluegrass: Southern Ohio's Musical Legacy, Various Artists, Joe Mullins (producer), Smithsonian Folkways Recordings (label)
- Banjo Player of the Year -- Scott Vestal
- Bass Player of the Year -- Missy Raines
- Collaborative Recording of the Year (formerly Recorded Event of the Year) -- "White Line Fever" featuring Bobby Osborne with Tim O’Brien, Trey Hensley, Sierra Hull, Stuart Duncan, Todd Phillips, Alison Brown
- Entertainer of the Year -- Billy Strings
- Female Vocalist of the Year -- Dale Ann Bradley
- Fiddle Player of the Year -- Bronwyn Keith-Hynes
- Gospel Recorded Performance of the Year -- "In the Resurrection Morning" by Sacred Reunion featuring Doyle Lawson, Vince Gill, Barry Abernathy, Tim Stafford, Mark Wheeler, Jim VanCleve, Phil Leadbetter, Jason Moore

and "After While" by Dale Ann Bradley

- Guitar Player of the Year -- Billy Strings
- Instrumental Group of the Year -- Appalachian Road Show
- Instrumental Recorded Performance of the Year -- Ground Speed by Kristin Scott Benson, Skip Cherryholmes, Jeremy Garrett, Kevin Kehrberg, and Darren Nicholson
- Male Vocalist of the Year -- Del McCoury and Danny Paisley
- Mandolin Player of the Year -- Sierra Hull
- New Artist of the Year (formerly Emerging Artist of the Year) -- Appalachian Road Show
- Resophonic Guitar Player of the Year -- Justin Moses
- Song of the Year -- "Richest Man" by Balsam Range, songwriters Jim Beavers, Jimmy Yeary, and Connie Harrington
- Vocal Group of the Year -- Sister Sadie

=== 2020 award winners ===
The 2020 award show was presented virtually on October 1, 2020.

- Entertainer of the Year – Sister Sadie
- Male Vocalist of the Year – Danny Paisley
- Female Vocalist of the Year – Brooke Aldridge
- Vocal Group of the Year – Sister Sadie
- Instrumental Group of the Year – Michael Cleveland and Flamekeeper
- New Artist of the Year – Mile Twelve
- Guitar Player of the Year – Jake Workman
- Banjo Player of the Year – Scott Vestal
- Mandolin Player of the Year – Alan Bibey
- Fiddle Player of the Year – Deanie Richardson
- Bass Player of the Year – Missy Raines
- Dobro Player of the Year – Justin Moses
- Album of the Year – Live in Prague (Doyle Lawson and Quicksilver)
- Song of the Year – "Chicago Barn Dance" (Alison Brown, Becky Buller, Missy Raines)
- Collaborative Recording of the Year – "The Barber's Fiddle" (Becky Buller with Shawn Camp, Jason Carter, Laurie Lewis, Kati Penn, Sam Bush, Michael Cleveland, Johnny Warren, Stuart Duncan, Deanie Richardson, Bronwyn Keith-Hynes, Jason Barie, Fred Carpenter, Tyler Andal, Nate Lee, Dan Boner, Brian Christianson, and Laura Orshaw
- Instrumental Recorded Performance of the Year – "Tall Fidler" (Michael Cleveland and Tommy Emmanuel)
- Gospel Recorded Performance of the Year – "Gonna Rise and Shine" (Alan Bibey and Grasstowne)

=== 2019 award winners ===
==== Recording awards ====
Category	Winner	Work	Songwriter	Producers	Label
Album of the Year	The Del McCoury Band	Del McCoury Still Sings Bluegrass		Del and Ronnie McCoury	McCoury Music
Collaborative Recording of the Year	Joe Mullins & The Radio Ramblers with Del McCoury	"The Guitar Song"		Joe Mullins, Jerry Salley (associate)	Billy Blue
Gospel Recorded Performance of the Year	Claire Lynch	"Gonna Sing, Gonna Shout"		Jerry Salley	Billy Blue
Instrumental Recorded Performance of the Year	Missy Raines with Alison Brown, Mike Bub, and Todd Phillips	"Darlin' Pal(s) of Mine"		Alison Brown	Compass Records
Song of the Year	Sideline	"Thunder Dan"	Josh Manning	Tim Surrett	Mountain Home Music Company

==== Musician awards ====
- Banjo Player of the Year: Kristin Scott-Benson
- Bass Player of the Year: Missy Raines
- Entertainer of the Year: Joe Mullins & The Radio Ramblers
- Female Vocalist of the Year: Brooke Aldridge
- Fiddle Player of the Year: Michael Cleveland
- Guitar Player of the Year: Billy Strings
- Instrumental Group of the Year: Michael Cleveland & Flamekeeper
- Male Vocalist of the Year: Russell Moore
- Mandolin Player of the Year: Alan Bibey
- New Artist of the Year: Billy Strings
- Resophonic Guitar Player of the Year: Phil Leadbetter
- Vocal Group of the Year: Sister Sadie

==== Industry awards ====
- Broadcaster of the Year: Michelle Lee
- Event of the Year: Blueberry Bluegrass Festival (Stony Plain, Alberta, Canada)
- Graphic Designer of the Year: Michael Armistead
- Liner Notes of the Year: Akira Otsuka, Dudley Connell, Jeff Place, Katy Daley (Epilogue: A Tribute to John Duffey)
- Songwriter of the Year: Jerry Salley
- Sound Engineer of the Year: Ben Surratt
- Writer of the Year: David Morris

==== Momentum Awards ====
- Cane Mill Road - Band of the Year
- AJ Lee - Vocalist of the Year
- Tray Wellington - (banjo), Instrumentalist of the Year
- Daniel Amick - (mandolin), Instrumentalist of the Year
- Anni Beach - Mentor
- Bennett Sullivan - Industry Involvement

==== Distinguished Achievement Award ====
- MoonShiner
- Allen Mills
- Dan Hays
- Mickey Gamble
- Katy Daley

==== Hall of Fame Inductees ====
- The Kentucky Colonels
- Bill Emerson
- Mike Auldridge

=== 2015 award winners ===
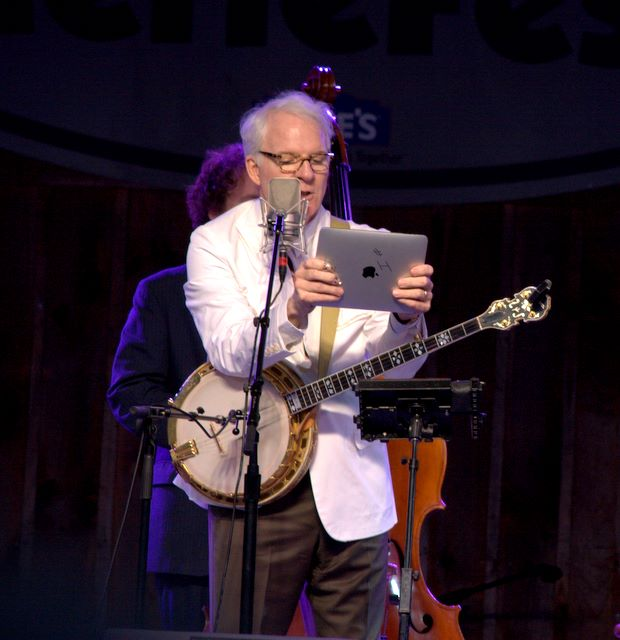
Actor Steve Martin (pictured above in 2010) presented with a distinguished achievement award at the 2015 award show.

The 2015 award show was held on October 1, 2015, in Raleigh, North Carolina. Actor and banjo player Steve Martin was presented with a distinguished achievement award by the IBMA. The show included induction of both Bill Keith and Larry Sparks into the International Bluegrass Music Hall of Fame.

- Entertainer of the Year – The Earls of Leicester
- Vocal Group of the Year – Balsam Range
- Instrumental Group of the Year – The Earls of Leicester
- Song of the Year – Balsam Range ("Moon Over Memphis")
- Album of the Year – The Earls of Leicester (The Earls of Leicester)
- Gospel Recorded Performance of the Year – The Earls of Leicester ("Who Will Sing for Me")
- Instrumental Recorded Performance of the Year – Jerry Douglas, Mike Auldridge, Rob Ickes ("The Three Bells")
- Recorded Event of the Year – Becky Buller ("Southern Flavor")
- Emerging Artist of the Year – Becky Buller
- Male Vocalist of the Year – Shawn Camp
- Female Vocalist of the Year – Rhonda Vincent
- Instrumental Performers of the Year – Rob McCoury (Banjo), Bryan Sutton (Guitar), Michael Cleveland (Fiddle), Tim Surrett (Bass), Jerry Douglas (Resophonic Guitar), Jesse Brock (Mandolin)

=== 2014 award winners ===
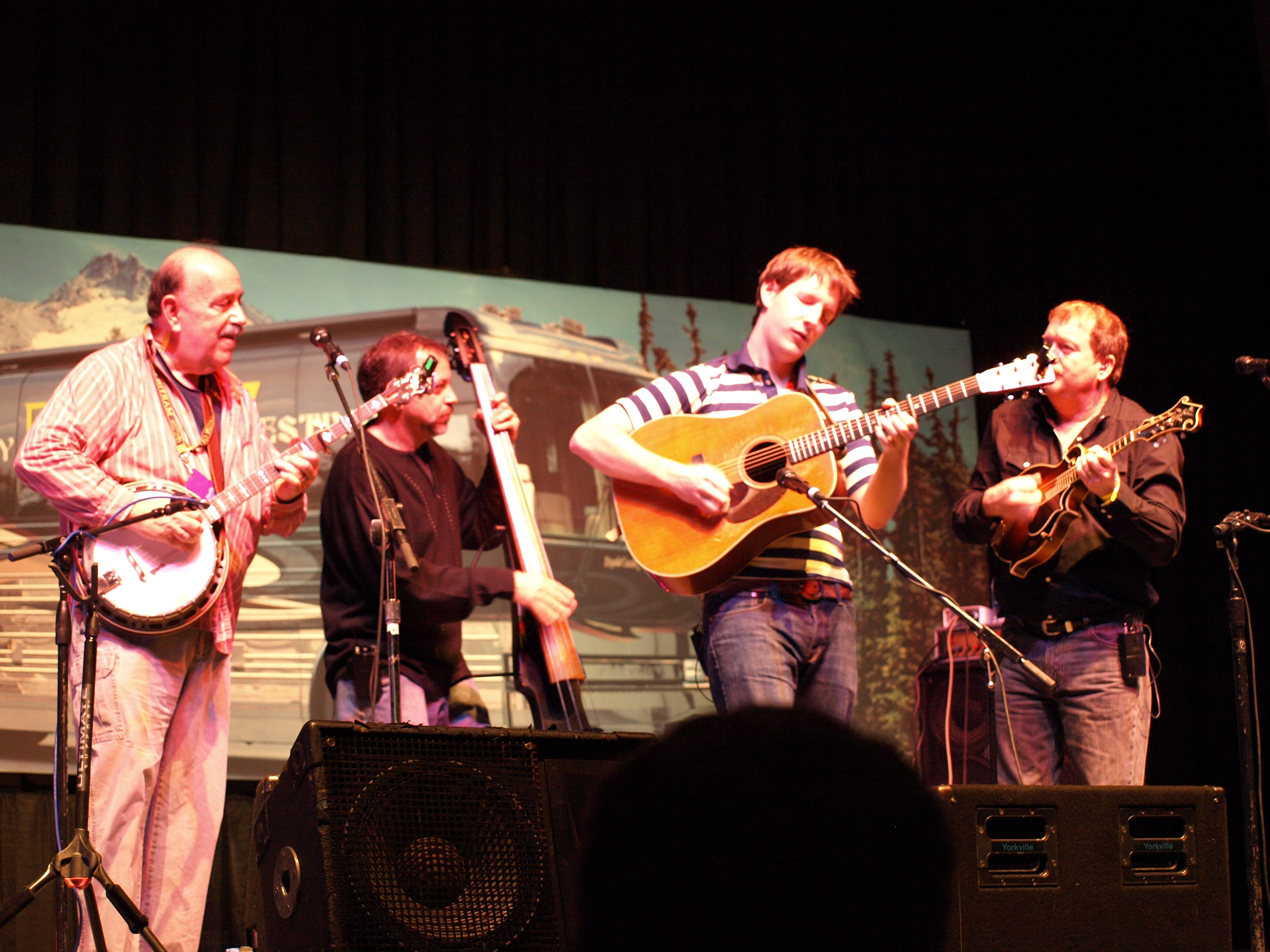
Members of The Seldom Scene playing at the Rivercity Bluegrass Festival in 2008. The group was inducted into the Bluegrass Music Hall of Fame at the 2014 International Bluegrass Music Awards.

The 2014 International Bluegrass Music Awards were held at the Duke Energy Center in Raleigh, North Carolina Performances at the show included Neil Rosenberge and Seldom Scene, both of whom were also inducted into the International Bluegrass Music Hall of Fame at the show. The show was hosted by Lee Ann Womack and Jerry Douglas, winner of more than two dozen previous IBMA awards. The show streamed live from the IBMA website as well as broadcast live on Bluegrass Junction. It also aired in Spring 2015 on American Public Television's Music City Roots television series.

- Entertainer of the Year – Balsam Range
- Vocal Group of the Year – Balsam Range
- Instrumental Group of the Year – Frank Solivan & Dirty Kitchen
- Song of the Year – Claire Lynch ("Dear Sister")
- Album of the Year – Noam Pikelny (Noam Pikelny Plays Kenny Baker Plays Bill Monroe)
- Gospel Recorded Performance of the Year – Dailey & Vincent ("Won't It Be Wonderful There")
- Instrumental Recorded Performance of the Year – The Special Consensus ("Thank God I'm a Country Boy")
- Recorded Event of the Year – The Special Consensus with Claire Lynch and Rob Ickes ("Wild Mountain Skies")
- Emerging Artist of the Year – Flatt Lonesome
- Male Vocalist of the Year – Buddy Melton
- Female Vocalist of the Year – Amanda Smith
- Instrumental Performers of the Year – Noam Pikelny (Banjo), Barry Bales (Bass), Jason Carter (Fiddle), Phil Leadbetter (Dobro), Bryan Sutton (Guitar), Adam Steffey (Mandolin)

=== 2013 award winners ===
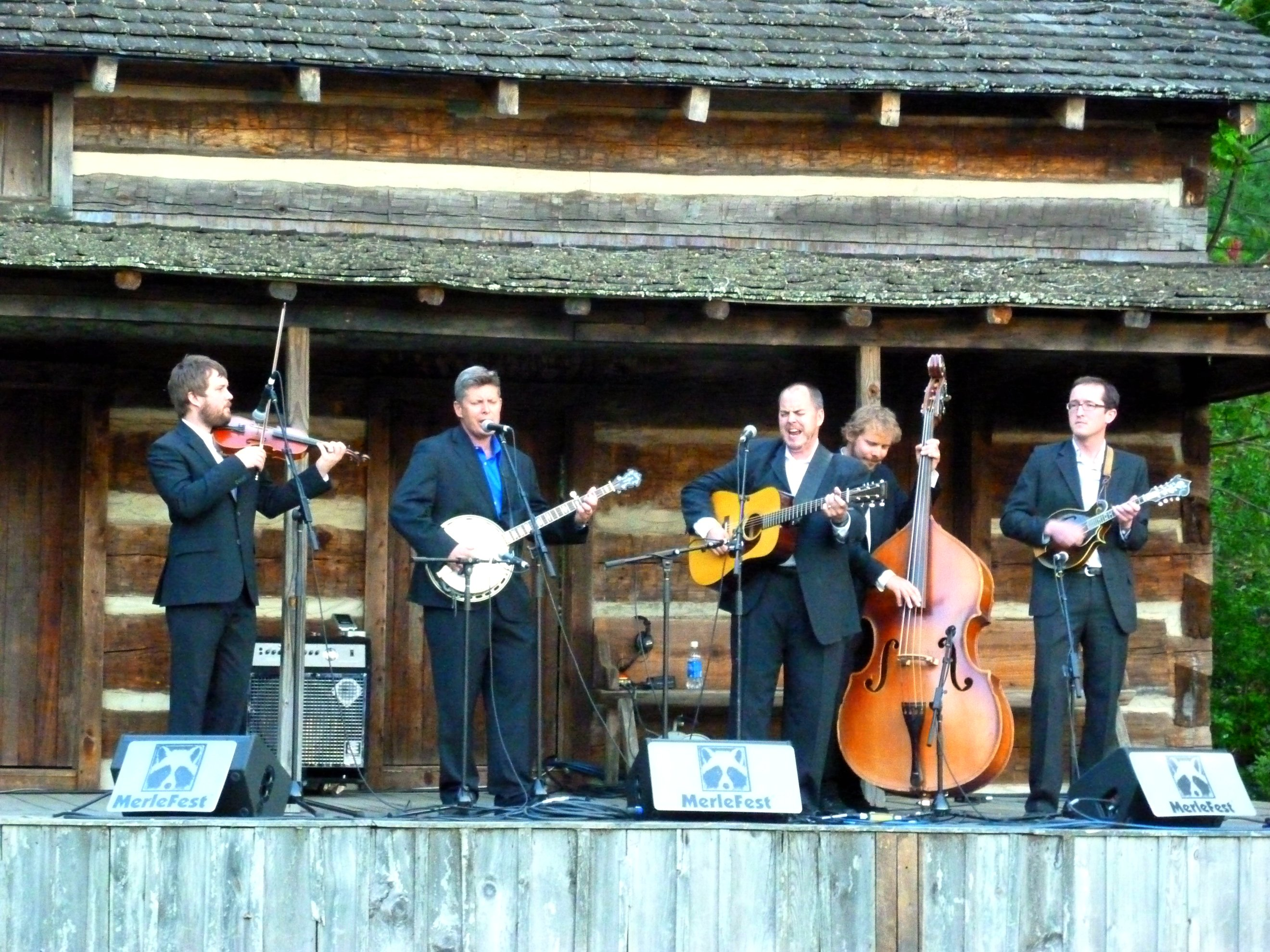
2013 Entertainer of the Year winners The Gibson Brothers performing at MerleFest in 2010.

The awards were held in Raleigh, North Carolina, the first time the show was hosted by the city. The show moved from Nashville, Tennessee to separate itself from country music. The Gibson Brothers had the most nominations individually and as a group, winning Entertainer of the Year, Vocal Group of the Year, Song of the Year, and Songwriter of the Year (Eric Gibson). During the show, Paul Warren and Tony Rice were inducted into the International Bluegrass Music Hall of Fame.

- Entertainer of the Year – The Gibson Brothers
- Vocal Group of the Year – The Gibson Brothers
- Instrumental Group of the Year – The Boxcars
- Song of the Year – The Gibson Brothers ("They Called It Music")
- Album of the Year – Balsam Range (Papertown)
- Gospel Recorded Performance of the Year – Marty Raybon ("Beulah Land")
- Instrumental Recorded Performance of the Year – Tom Adams, Ron Block, J. D. Crowe, Charlie Cushman, Kenny Ingram, Jim Mills, Joe Mullins, Larry Perkins, Craig Smith, Ron Stewart, David Talbot, & Tony Trischka ("Foggy Mountain Rock")
- Recorded Event of the Year – Terry Baucom ("What'll I Do?")
- Emerging Artist of the Year – Della Mae
- Male Vocalist of the Year – Junior Sisk
- Female Vocalist of the Year – Claire Lynch
- Instrumental Performers of the Year – Mike Munford (Banjo), Barry Bales (Bass), Jason Carter (Fiddle), Rob Ickes (Dobro), Bryan Sutton (Guitar), Adam Steffey (Mandolin)

=== 1999 award winners ===
- Entertainer of the Year – Del McCoury Band
- Fiddle player of the Year – Randy Howard
- Mandolin Player of the Year – Ronnie McCoury
- Vocal Group of the Year – IIIrd Tyme Out

=== 1990 award winners ===
==== Recording Awards ====
Category	Winner	Work	Label	Writers
Album of the Year	The Johnson Mountain Boys	At The Old Schoolhouse	Rounder Records	
Collaborative Recording of the Year	John Duffey, Charlie Waller, Eddie Adcock & Tom Gray	Classic Country Gents Reunion	Sugar Hill Records	
Instrumental Recorded Performance of the Year	Adcock, Baker, Graves & McReynolds	The Masters	CMH	
Song of the Year	Doyle Lawson & Quicksilver	"Little Mountain Church"		Jim Rushing & Carl Jackson

==== Musician Awards ====
- Banjo Player of the Year: Béla Fleck
- Bass Player of the Year: Roy Huskey Jr.
- Entertainer of the Year: Hot Rize
- Female Vocalist of the Year: Alison Krauss
- Fiddle Player of the Year: Stuart Duncan
- Guitar Player of the Year: Tony Rice
- Instrumental Group of the Year: The Bluegrass Album Band
- Male Vocalist of the Year: Del McCoury
- Mandolin Player of the Year: Sam Bush
- Resophonic Guitar Player of the Year: Jerry Douglas
- Vocal Group of the Year: The Nashville Bluegrass Band

==== Industry Awards ====
- Broadcaster of the Year: Orin Friesen
- Writer of the Year: Art Menius

==== Distinguished Achievement Award ====
- Dr. Charles Wolfe
- Joe Stuart
- Wade Mainer
- Carlton Haney

=== 1989 award winners ===
==== Distinguished Achievement Award ====
- Dr. Bill C. Malone
- Robert Larkin
- Kathy Kaplan
- David Freeman
- Lester Flatt

=== 1988 award winners ===
==== Distinguished Achievement Award ====
- Bill Vernon
- Earl Scruggs
- Ola Belle Reed
- Peter V. Kuykendall
- Tom Henderson
- John Duffey

=== 1987 award winners ===
==== Distinguished Achievement Award ====
- Charlie Waller
- Ralph Rinzler
- Don Owens
- Bill Jones
- Dewitt "Snuffy" Jenkins

=== 1986 award winners ===
==== Distinguished Achievement Award ====
- Neil Rosenberg
- Cuzin' Isaac Page
- Ruby Baker Moody
- Bill Monroe
- Ray Davis
- Albert E. Brumley
