= Alan Bartram =

American bluegrass musician (born 1977)

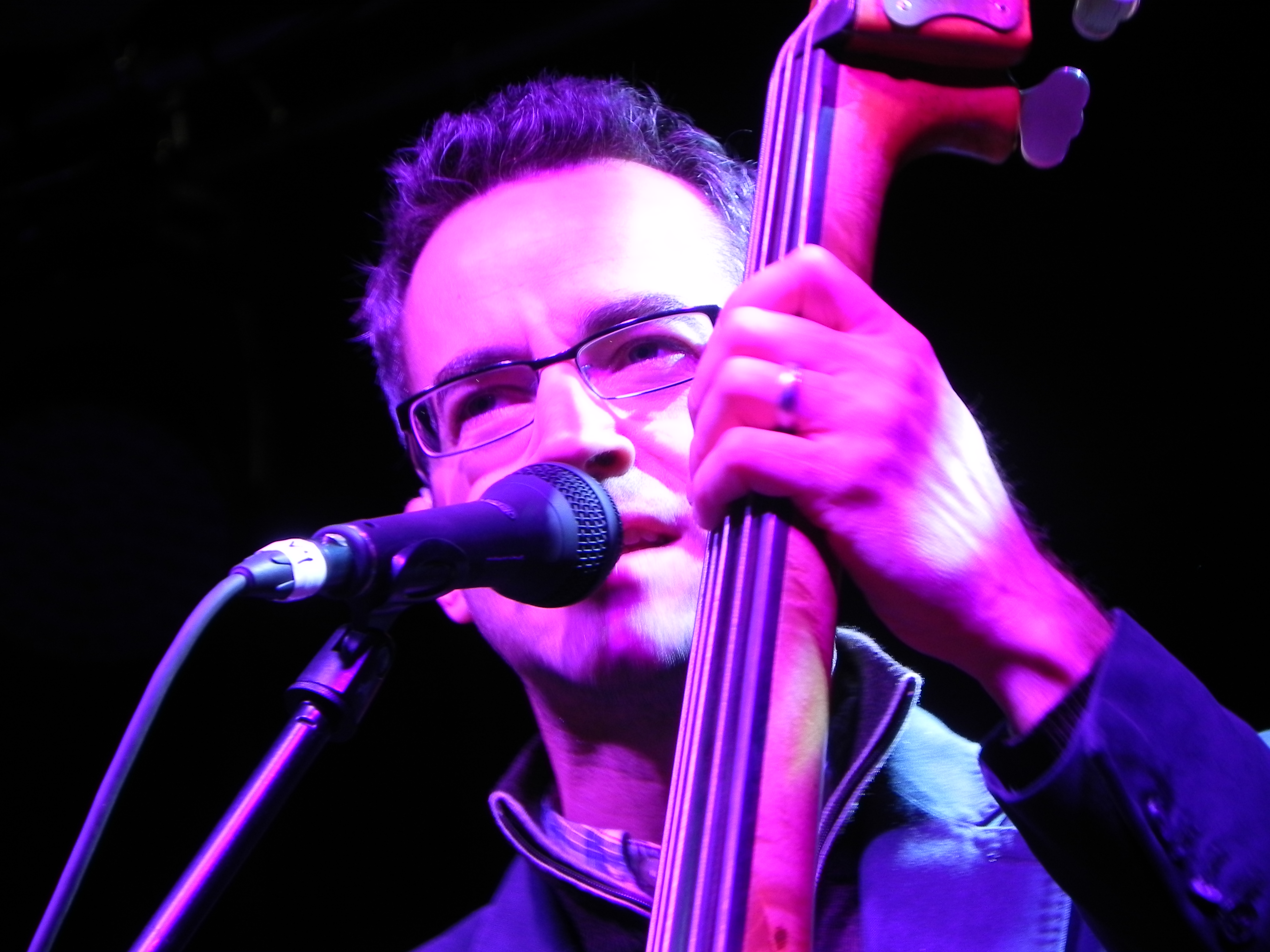

Background information
- Born: April 19, 1977 (age 49); Huntington, West Virginia
- Genre: Bluegrass
- Instrument: Bass
- Years active: 1998–present
- Labels: McCoury; Rounder

Alan Bartram (born April 19, 1977) is an American bluegrass musician who plays bass. He is best known for his work with the Del McCoury Band and the Travelin' McCourys.

== Biography ==
Alan Bartram was born in Huntington, West Virginia on April 19, 1977.

He discovered bluegrass music at 16 when his uncle took him to his first festival. He had already been playing guitar, and was completely enamored of the culture of "jamming with other pickers." Upon graduation from college in 2003 he joined the Kenny and Amanda Smith Band appearing on their album Always Never Enough. In 2005 he joined the Del McCoury Band on bass. He also played briefly in an early version of the Infamous Stringdusters, appearing on the band's 2007 album, Fork in the Road. He has been playing full-time with the Del McCoury Band since 2005, and The Travelin' McCourys since 2009.

He was named the International Bluegrass Music Association bass player of the year in 2017.
