= Tray Wellington =

American musician (born 1998 or 1999)

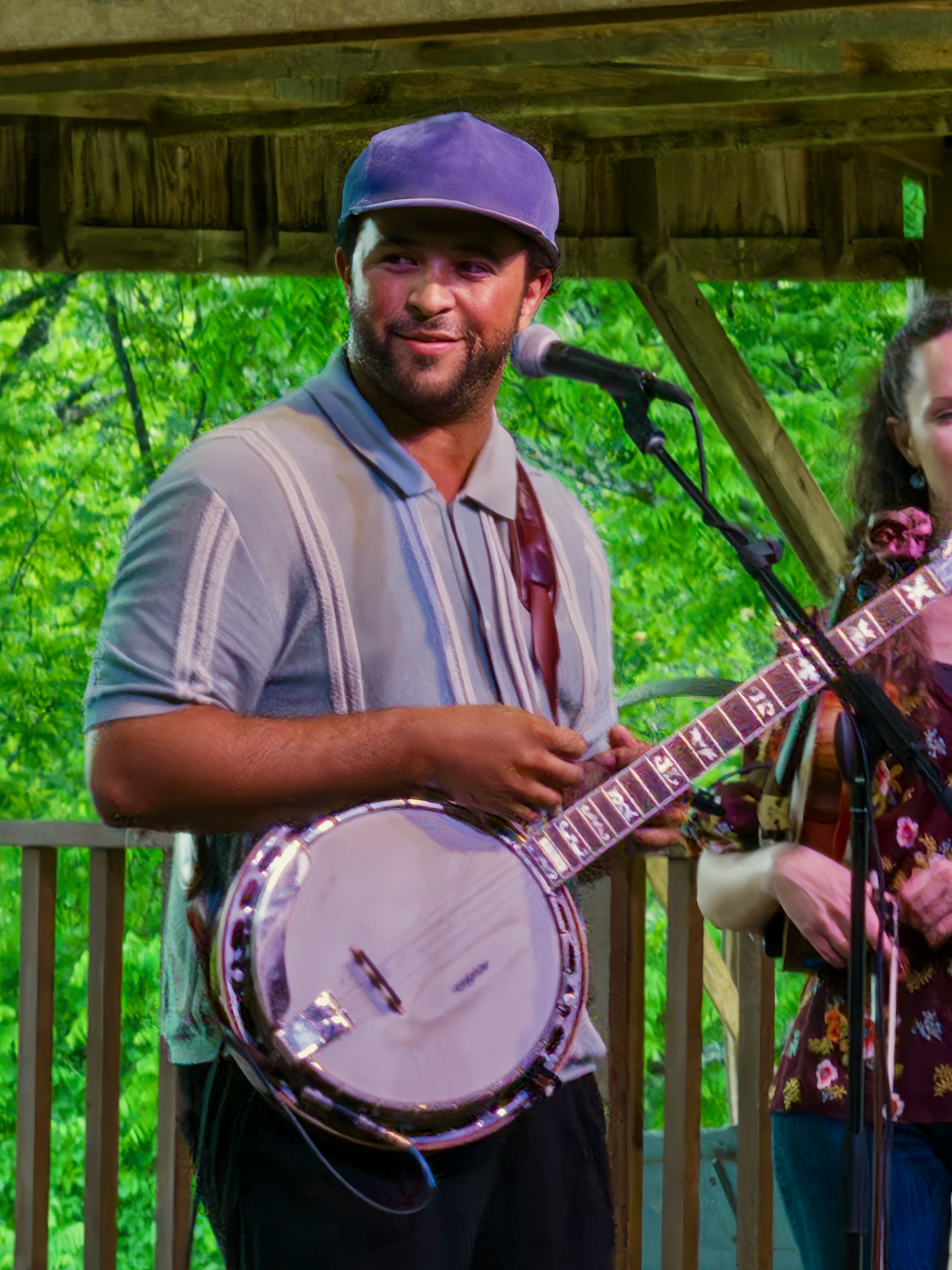
- Wellington in 2026

Background information
- Born: Trajan Allen Wellington; 1998 or 1999 (age 27–28); Ashe County, North Carolina, US
- Genres: Bluegrass
- Instrument: Banjo
- Label: Mountain Home Records
- Publisher: Mountain Music Home Company
- Website: https://traywellington.com/

Trajan Allen "Tray" Wellington (born 1998 or 1999) is an American bluegrass banjoist from North Carolina. He received the International Bluegrass Music Momentum Award (IBMA) in 2019 for instrumentalist of the year and had been a finalist for the New Artist of the Year for two consecutive years, 2023–2024.

== Early life ==
Wellington was born in Ashe County, North Carolina. During his childhood, he developed an interest in music and learned to play the electric guitar. Wellington cites his grandfather as having introduced him to classic country music. In middle school, he discovered banjo and began learning to play it. He subsequently went to East Tennessee State University where he majored in bluegrass music. During his time in the university, Wellington played alongside his band, Cane Mill Road which includes other East Tennessee State University grads. The band went on to win the IBMA award for the band of the year in 2019. The IMBA's Arnold Shultz Fund has supported Black musicians like Wellington.

== Career ==
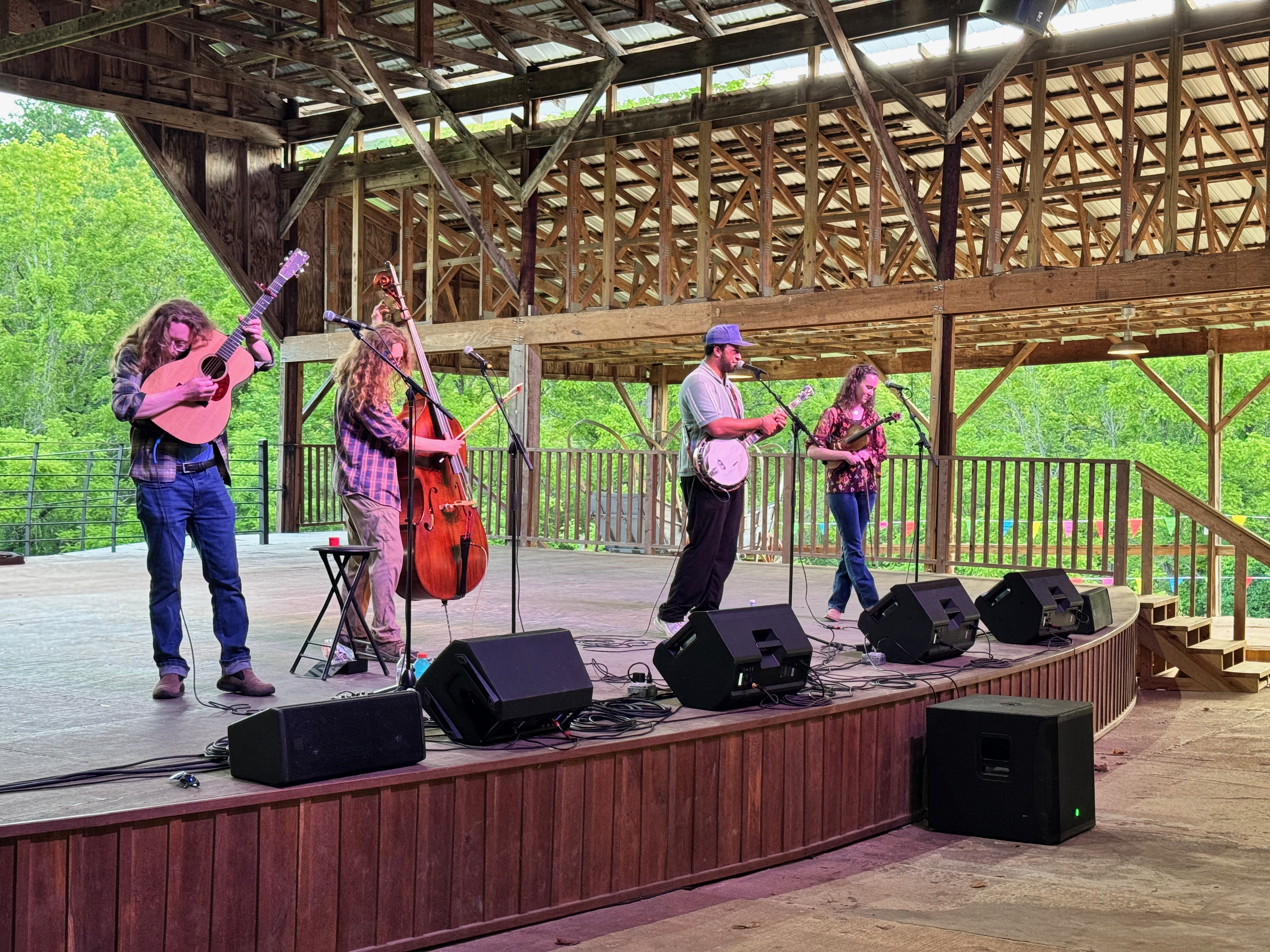
The Tray Wellington Band performs at the John C. Campbell Folk School

Wellington is known for being a part of the black reclamation of banjo music. His debut album, Black Banjo, recorded during the COVID-19 pandemic and released in 2022, infuses a modern jazz style into traditional bluegrass banjo music while maintaining an emphasis on showcasing the black roots of the music. In 2024, he released a seven song project, Detour to the Moon which also draws inspiration from jazz, hiphop and blues and includes a cover of Kid Cudi's Pursuit of Happiness sung in a bluegrass style. In the same year, Wellington received the Steve Martin Banjo Prize for his new approach to bluegrass music.
