= Valerie Smith (musician) =

American roots and bluegrass recording artist

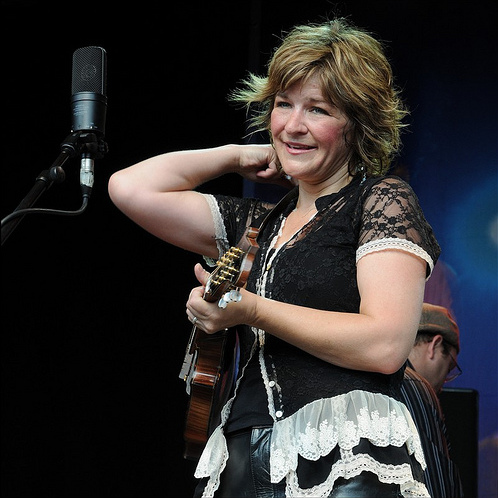

Background information
- Born: Valerie Jean Stevens; July 25, 1966 (age 60); North Kansas City, Missouri, United States
- Genres: American roots; Bluegrass
- Occupations: Singer-songwriter; Recording artist; Music instructor
- Instrument: Vocals
- Years active: 1997–present
- Website: thevaleriesmith.com

Valerie Smith (born July 25, 1966) is an American roots and bluegrass recording artist who has performed in the United States, Europe, Canada and the United Kingdom, as well as being a music teacher. Her supporting band is called "Liberty Pike", named after a historic road that connects from Nashville, TN through Bell Buckle, TN. (Battle of Liberty Gap)

== Early career ==
Valerie Smith has been known as a country artist with styles that range from bluegrass, blues, and gospel music. Valerie received her Bachelors of Music in Kansas City at the University of Kansas City in 1989. Smith was a music instructor for the Kearney School District, Kearney, Missouri, and later taught in the state of Tennessee for the Brentwood School District in Brentwood, Tennessee. During her residence in Nashville, Tennessee, she became interested in songwriting and recording arts. Artist Charlie Louvin (from the Louvin Brothers– known for My Baby's Gone), became her mentor and made it possible for her to perform on the Grand Ole Opry in Nashville, Tennessee. Smith performed a duet that was recorded on her debut CD, "Patchwork Heart" with Charlie Louvin.

Smith recorded her first project with the Grammy award winning composer, producer, instrumentalist, recording artist of the Nashville Bluegrass Band, Alan O'Bryant. During the release of the album, "Patchwork Heart", a song written by Gillian Welch and David Rawlings and performed by Smith, Red Clay Halo, would reach the Bluegrass Unlimited Radio Survey, Country Music and Americana reporting charts and remained on the list for five years. Because of the popularity and the longevity of the song, it was voted by the bluegrass community to be one of the top 60 songs of the decade. The song brought Smith to the attention of the media.

Valerie Smith received two awards from the International Bluegrass Music Association, for Recorded Event of the year, 2001, for Follow Me Back to the Fold (produced by Mark Newton, Rebel Records) and in 2006 for the compilation of Follow Me Back to the Well (produced by Lorrain Jordan and Dale Perry, Blue Circle Records).

== Later career ==
Valerie Smith's recording and performance style has been described as exuberant by John Hansen in the Brainerd Dispatch, while Jeff Bahr of the American News wrote that "watching Valerie Smith perform is like being a witness to a thermonuclear explosion".

The International Bluegrass Music Museum, Owensboro, Kentucky, commissioned Valerie Smith to create a special program to teach large groups of students about the bluegrass genre and its history. "Bluegrass in the Schools" and "American Roots Music" continues to be presented throughout United States, Europe, UK, and Canada where Smith performs very frequently.

Moving to nearby Bell Buckle, Tennessee, she produced several artists and helped produce a concert series, Live at the Bell Buckle Café and became owner of Bell Buckle Records, working closely to Rebel Records. Smith released "Patchwork Heart", "Turtle Wings", and "No Summer Storm" through Rebel Records. Tom T. Hall was featured on the guitar for the recording of song, "Sit Down and Cry" on Valerie's third release, "No Summer Storm". (Dirty Linen Magazine, February/March 2003, No. 104, staff journalist, Paul E. Comeau). During the year of 2003, it has been described that her music had been received with widespread critical and popular acclaim in the world of bluegrass (Bluegrass Now Magazine, June 2003, page 27, written by Joe Romano) Bill Vorndick and Ralph Stanley included her on the Grammy-nominated CD, "Clinch Mountain Sweet Hearts"(which includes Dolly Parton, Joni Mitchell and many other female country singers). She recorded the song, "I'll Remember You Love in my Prayers" with the late, legendary Ralph Stanley. Tom T. Hall would later write and make a special appearance on her second album, "No Summer Storm". Lord, I'm Ready was the song on the project that charted on the Bluegrass Survey Charts. Smith has been included in all three recordings of "Daughters of Bluegrass" produced by Blue Circle Records, owned by Tom and Dixie Hall.

In the year 2005, Smith began to develop vocal issues from a growth that irritated her larynx while singing and went through two vocal surgeries. She recovered the ability to sing strongly and continued to record a duet CD with singer/songwriter and award-winning Becky Buller, "Here's a Little Song". and then would continue to record her first gospel project, "Wash Away Your Troubles". Smith arranged the song, "Wade in the Water" and wrote "Ole John Bell" for an independent movie, Bell Witch the Movie.

Smith continues to appear on television shows such as RFD Ronnie Reno Show, and Bluegrass Underground, and to write, produce and record music released by Bell Buckle Records. The album, Small Town Heroes had a number 1 debut song, "Something About a Train" on the Roots Music Report for 6 months.

June 2019, Valerie Smith released a single, "It's a Dry Town" that was nominated in the Independent Music Awards held in New York, NY for best Alternative Country Single. March 2020, she released an acoustic version of Julie Gold's Grammy nominated song, "From a Distance" and it charted at #2 on Bluegrass Today Grassicana, simultaneously charting #2 on Folk Charts and #9 on Bluegrass Today Charts during the Month of May 2020.

Smith & Liberty Pike tours and performs shows in the United States, United Kingdom, Canada and Europe, such as the Rudolstadt Festival, 2007 in Rudolstadt, Germany and the Blueberry Bluegrass Festival, 2015, Alberta, Canada.

== Discography ==
- Patchwork Heart (1998) Rebel
- Turtle Wings (2000) Rebel
- Follow Me Back to the Fold (2001) Rebel
- Clinch Mountain Sweethearts (2001) Rebel
- For The Long Haul (2002) iBest Music
- No Summer Storm (2002) Rebel
- That's What Love Can Do (2005) Bell Buckle Records
- Follow Me Back to the Well (2006) Rebel
- Here's a Little Song Bell Buckle Records (2006)
- Wash Away Your Troubles (2006) Bell Buckle Records
- "Bell Witch, The Movie" sound recording (2007) Cinimarr Studios, Penny Jar Records
- Festivalink Presents Valerie Smith & Liberty Pike (2007) Festivalink.net
- Here's a Little Song with Becky Buller (2007), Bell Buckle Records
- Some of My Favorites (2010) Bell Buckle Records
- Human Condition (2014) Bell Buckle Records
- Small Town Heroes (2016) Bell Buckle Records
- Renaissance (2021) Bell Buckle Records

Film

- "Bell Witch, The Movie" sound recording (2007) Cinimarr Studios (contributed sound recording and written song, "Old John Bell") (The Tennessean, Wednesday, September 21, 2005, Ken Beck, Witchy woman music, performance of a one-hour concert at the Ryman, Nashville, TN)
- "Country Roads" filmed in and wrote music for Country Roads, an independent German documentary film (2011), sound recording "Heaven is Waiting", written by Becky Buller
- It's a Dry Town (2017) Bell Buckle Records
- From a Distance (2020) Bell Buckle Records
