= Cody Kilby =

American bluegrass musician

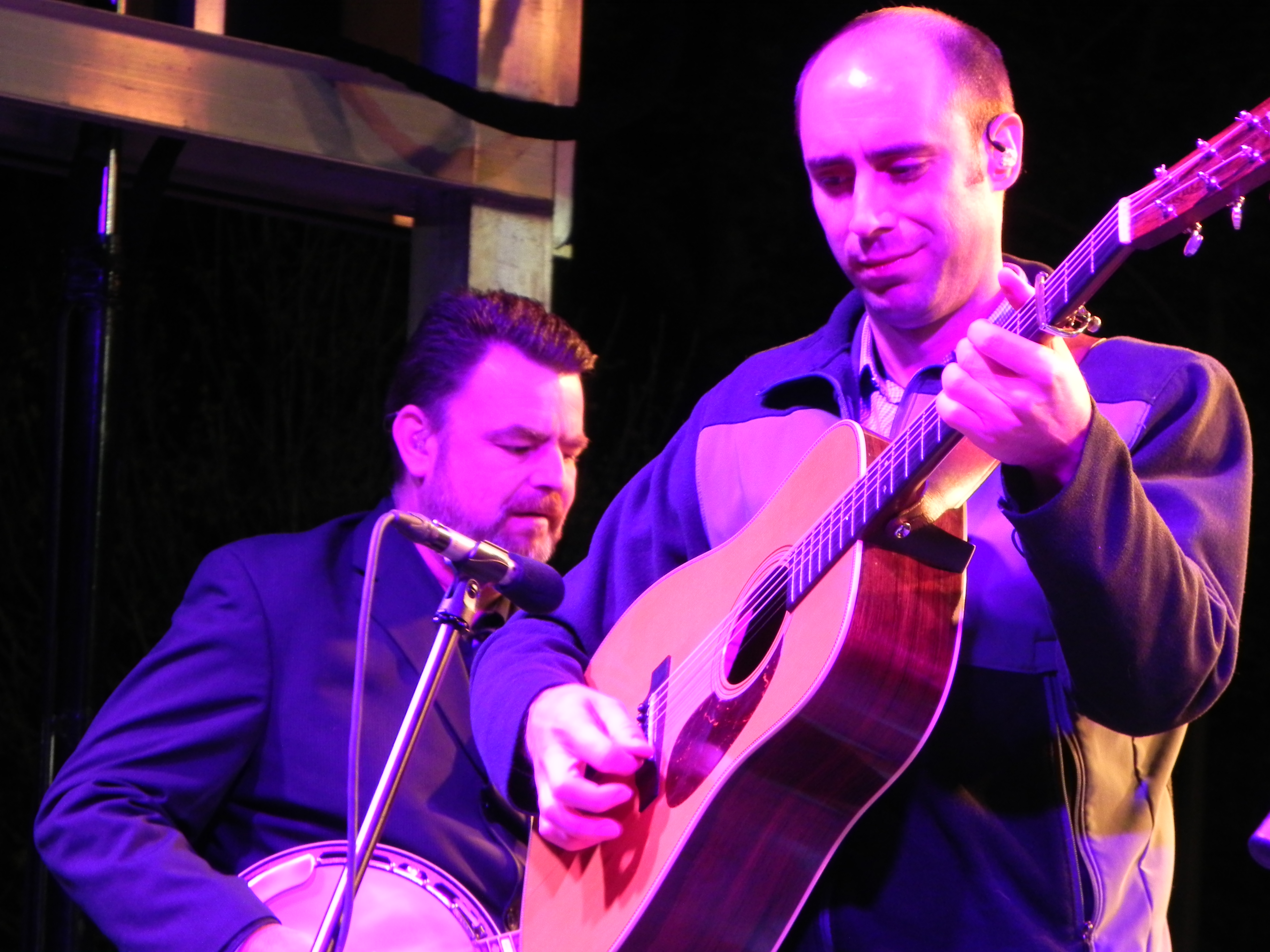
- Cody Kilby at Charm City Bluegrass Festival 2015

Background information
- Genres: Bluegrass music
- Instrument: Guitar
- Years active: 1994–present
- Labels: McCoury Music; Rounder

Cody Kilby is an American bluegrass musician who plays guitar. He is best known for his work with the Ricky Skaggs & Kentucky Thunder and the Travelin' McCourys.

== Biography ==
Cody Kilby was born in Tennessee. He is a musical prodigy who has mastered a wide range of instruments. He picked up his Dad’s banjo at age 8 and by the time he was 11, he had a Gibson banjo endorsement. He began playing his mom’s guitar at 10. At 17, in 1998, he was named the National Flatpicking Champion. He also learned to play Dobro and Mandolin at 13. At 16, he recorded Just Me, on which he played every instrument on the album. In 2001 Kilby joined Ricky Skaggs & Kentucky Thunder. He would stay with the band for 14 years. During this time he would win four Grammy Awards as a part of Skaggs' band. In 2015 he would leave Kentucky Thunder to join The Travelin' McCourys

== Recordings ==
In addition to his work with Ricky Skaggs & Kentucky Thunder, Kilby has guested on a number of albums. He has also released two solo albums, 1997's Just Me and 2011's Many Roads Traveled.

Kilby played guitar on Beck's Morning Phase that won the Grammy Award for Album of the Year in 2015.

He has also recorded with Bruce Hornsby, Ronnie Milsap, the Dixie Chicks, Dolly Parton, Tracy Lawrence, Alison Krauss, Marty Stuart, Jim Lauderdale, Rhonda Vincent, Dailey & Vincent, Marty Raybon, Jimmy Fortune, The Chieftains, Earl Scruggs, Ruthie Collins, The Whites, and Barry Gibb.

== Discography ==
=== Solo recordings ===
- 1997: Just Me (Rebel Records)
- 2011: Many Roads Traveled (Independent Release)

== Awards ==
- IBMA guitar player of the year: 2022
- National Flat Pick Guitar Championship: First 1998
- Walnut Valley Festival Mandolin Championship (1976-2009, Now known as the National Mandolin Championship): First 1996
- National Flat Pick Guitar Championship: Second 1997, 1995
- National Bluegrass Banjo Championship: Second 1995
- National Bluegrass Banjo Championship: Third 1999, 1998
- National Flat Pick Guitar Championship: Third 1996
