= The Travelin' McCourys =

American bluegrass band

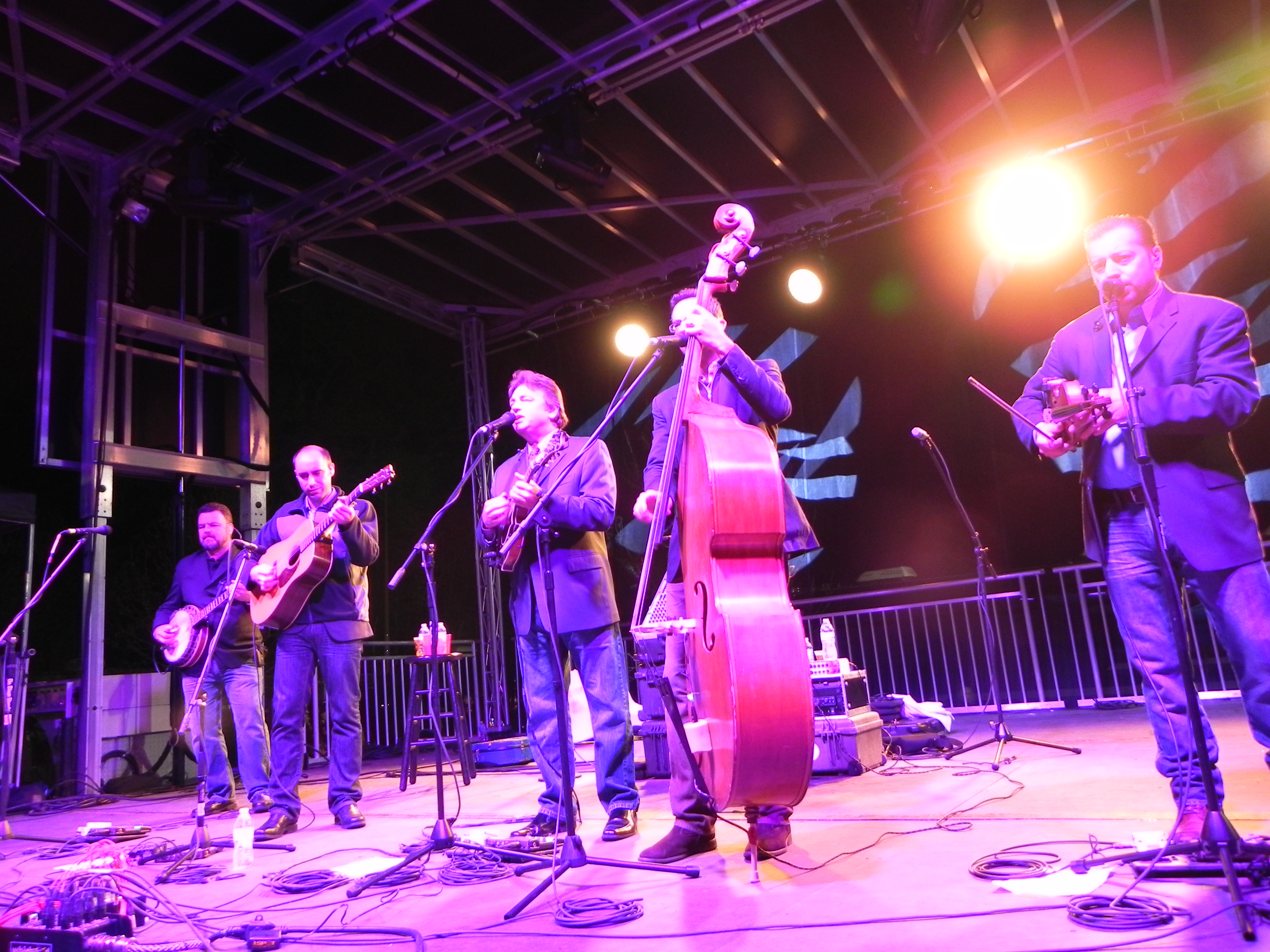

Background information
- Origin: Nashville, Tennessee, U.S.
- Genres: Bluegrass; progressive bluegrass
- Years active: 2009-present
- Label: McCoury Music
- Spinoff of: Del McCoury Band
- Members: Ronnie McCoury; Rob McCoury; Alan Bartram; Cody Kilby; Christian Ward
- Past members: Jason Carter
- Website: www.thetravelinmccourys.com

The Travelin' McCourys is a bluegrass band from Nashville, Tennessee, formed in 2009. The band is composed of brothers Ronnie McCoury, Rob McCoury, Alan Bartram, Christian Ward, and Cody Kilby and was formed out of the Del McCoury Band, in which the McCourys and Bartram still play.

== History ==
Ronnie and Rob McCoury, on mandolin and banjo respectively, got their start as teenagers playing with their father, bluegrass legend Del McCoury, with his band in the eighties. Originally the band played under the name Del McCoury and the Dixie Pals, but that name was dropped in 1988 in favor of the simpler moniker Del McCoury Band. The lineup for the band solidified with the addition of fiddler Jason Carter and bassist Mike Bub in 1992. Bub left in 2005 and was replaced by Alan Bartram.

The Del McCoury Band became one of the premiere traditional bluegrass bands in the country, garnering many band and individual awards. The International Bluegrass Music Association named them Entertainer of the Year nine times ('94, '96-00, '02-'04), Instrumental Group of the Year twice ('96 & '97), Song of the Year ('02), and Album of the Year ('04). Individual band members have received numerous International Bluegrass Music Awards with Ronnie being named mandolin player of the year eight times ('93-'00), Carter fiddler of the year six times ('97, '98, '03, '13, '14, '23), and Rob and Bartram winning once each on banjo ('15) and bass ('17).

Despite the numerous accolades and awards the band received, Del recognized that the band needed to think about their future saying, "If something ever happens to me ... you should think about doing something now, instead of starting out cold. This is a progression." Ronnie says, "We had to figure out something we could do, while still performing with my dad. We don’t want this to be the Del-less McCoury Band." The band was presented with an opportunity at the annual Delfest Music Festival, an annual bluegrass festival in Cumberland, Maryland, held at the Allegany County Fairgrounds that was started by Del McCoury. At Delfest, the band met The Lee Boys, a funk and gospel band, and played together through the weekend, finding an immediate connection. Plans were made for the two bands, minus Del McCoury, to hit the road for brief tour in the Southeast in January 2009. The band took the name the Travelin' McCourys for the brief tour. Since then they have regularly toured across the country, sharing the stage and collaborating with a number of artists including, Jeff Austin, Keller Williams, and Bill Nershi.

Since the first tour with the Lee Boys, the Travelin' McCourys have established themselves as a separate entity from the Del McCoury Band. They still serve as the Del McCoury Band, but now split their time between both bands. While there are many similarities on stage between the two, the Travelin' McCourys have moved slightly away from the more traditional sound of the Del McCoury Band and incorporated a wider range of musical styles creating a more progressive bluegrass sound. Ronnie says, "We like to go in and play traditional bluegrass music the way we do it with Dad, but we also like to be able to step into situations where we can really stretch out. If we need to plug in, we’ll plug in. We’re open to anything.” Rolling Stone Magazine says the band, "has the musical chops to pick fast and with precision, but gives off a looser vibe," and describes their sound as a, "sublime combination of rock and bluegrass, contemporary and classic, old and young."

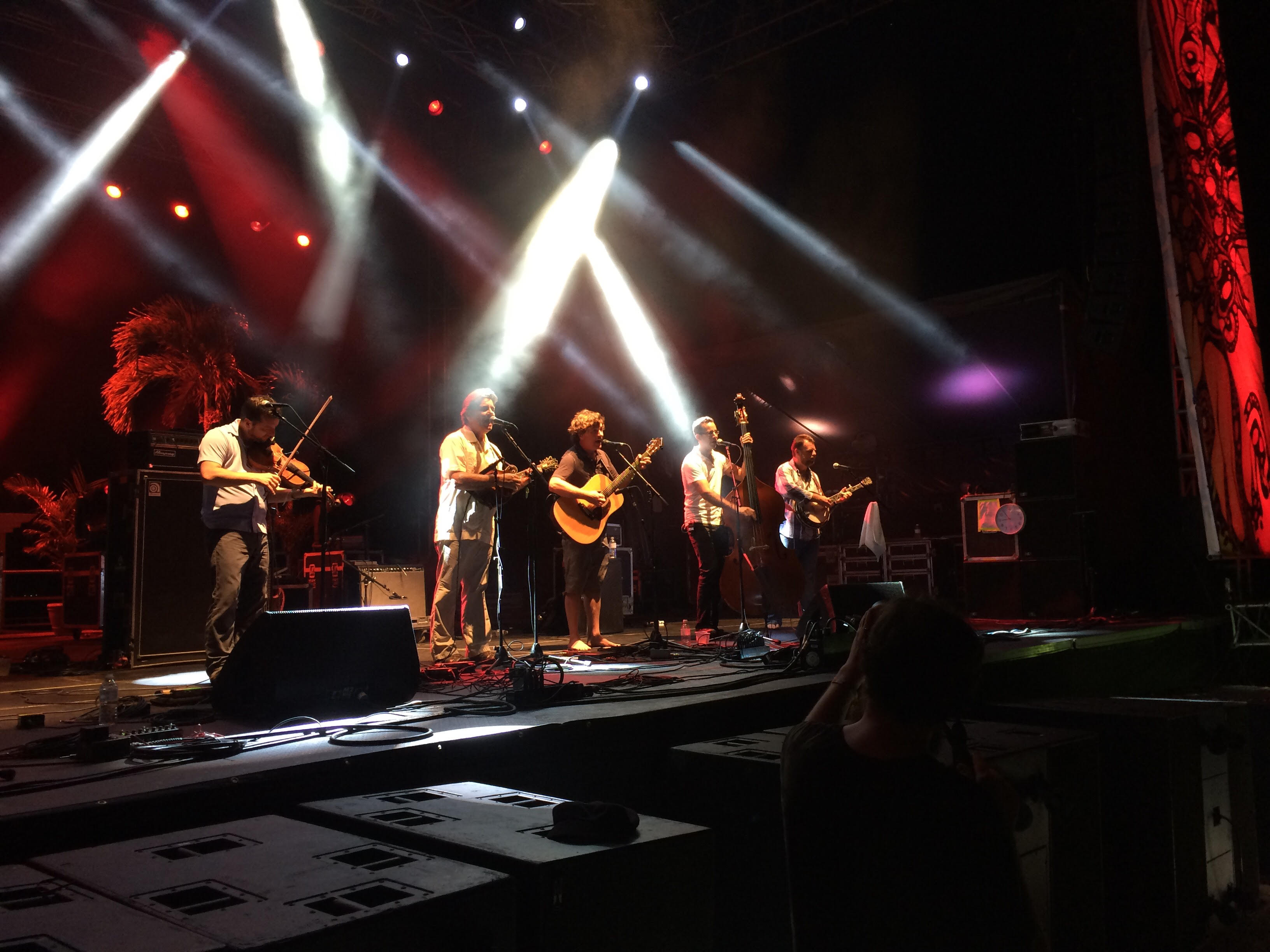
Travelin' McCourys with Keller Williams at Strings & Sol 2013.

When they first started as the Travelin' McCourys they used a rotating cast of guitar players that included Jeff Autry, Ronnie Bowman, Jeff White, and others. As they became a full-time, touring band, they knew they needed a permanent guitar player. They agreed on Cody Kilby who was playing with Ricky Skaggs & Kentucky Thunder. Ronnie McCoury explains the decision to add Kilby came during DelFest in 2015, “I guess we had our ‘a-ha’ moment at DelFest this year. We were on stage Saturday night and it was like a light bulb went on — with Cody, we really have the perfect combination. Don’t get me wrong, we enjoy featuring guests and still plan to collaborate at times, but from now on, Cody will be involved in all of those shows. He is a great player, and fits perfectly with what we do — straddling the fence between traditional and progressive. No matter what we throw at him, he can handle it.”

== The Grateful Ball ==
The Grateful Ball, is a bluegrassified tribute to the Grateful Dead, created by the Travelin' McCourys. It has its roots in a one-off performance in the summer of 2016 with the Travelin' McCourys and the Jeff Austin Band at Urban Chestnut Brewing in St. Louis. The show was so popular that a tour was scheduled with both bands where each played a set on their own, followed by a joint set of modern bluegrass arrangements of Grateful Dead material. Since then the Travelin's McCourys have combined with a variety of artists on a number of Grateful Ball tours reinterpreting the music of the Grateful Dead every night.

== Band members ==
=== Current members ===
- Ronnie McCoury - vocals, mandolin (2009–present)
- Rob McCoury - vocals, banjo (2009–present)
- Alan Bartram - vocals, double bass (2009–present)
- Cody Kilby - vocals, guitar (2015–present)
- Christian Ward - fiddle (2025–present)

=== Former members ===
- Jason Carter - vocals, fiddle (2009–2025)

== Awards ==
- Ronnie McCoury - IBMA mandolin player of the year: 1993, 1994, 1995, 1996, 1997, 1998, 1999, 2000

-IBMA Instrumental Recorded Performance of the Year: 1996 (Ronnie & Rob )

- Rob McCoury - IBMA banjo player of the year: 2015

-IBMA Instrumental Recorded Performance of the Year: 1996 (Ronnie & Rob )

- Jason Carter - IBMA fiddler of the year: 1997, 1998, 2003, 2013, 2014, 2023
- Alan Bartram - IBMA bass player of the year: 2017
- The Travelin' McCourys - Grammy Award for Best Bluegrass Album, The Travelin' Mccourys, 2018

== Discography ==
The Travelin' McCoury's have released two albums, 2012's Pick, a collaboration with Keller Williams, and 2018's eponymous album, which won the 2019 Grammy Award for Best Bluegrass Album, along with a number of solo releases.

=== Albums ===
==== Travelin' McCourys w/ Keller Williams ====
Year	Title	Label
2012	Pick	SCI Fidelity Records

==== Travelin' McCourys ====
Year	Title	Label
2018	The Travelin' McCourys	McCoury Music

==== Ronnie & Rob McCoury ====
Year	Title	Label
1995	Ronnie & Rob McCoury	Rounder Records

==== Ronnie McCoury ====
Year	Title	Label
2000	Heartbreak Town	Rounder
2007	Little Mo' McCoury	McCoury Music

==== Rob McCoury ====
Year	Title	Label
2014	The 5 String Flamethrower	McCoury Music

==== Jason Carter ====
Year	Title	Label
1997	On the Move	Rounder

==== Cody Kilby ====
Year	Title	Label
1997	Just Me	Rebel Records
2008	Many Roads	
