= Laws of Gravity (album) =

Laws Of Gravity

Studio album by The Infamous Stringdusters
- Released: January 13, 2017
- Genre: Bluegrass
- Length: 54 mins
- Label: Compass Records

Laws of Gravity is an album by The Infamous Stringdusters that won the Grammy Award for Best Bluegrass Album in the 60th Annual Grammy Awards in 2018. It was released on Compass Records in 2017.

== Track listing ==
No.	Title	Length
1	Freedom	3:18
2	Gravity	3:42
3	A Hard Life Makes A Good Song	3:49
4	Vertigo	3:37
5	Maxwell	5:06
6	Black Elk	4:57
7	This Ol' Building	3:31
8	Soul Searching	3:29
9	1901: A Canyon Odyssey	4:36
10	Sirens	4:06
11	Back Home	4:38
12	Let Me Know	3:52
13	I Run To You	5:28
