= Alecia Nugent =

American singer-songwriter (born 1972)

- Born: 1972 (age 53–54)
- Origin: Hickory Grove, Louisiana, U.S.
- Genres: Bluegrass
- Occupations: Singer, musician
- Years active: 1996–present
- Labels: Rounder
- Website: http://www.alecianugent.com

Alecia Nugent (born in Hickory Grove, Louisiana) is a country, Americana, bluegrass vocalist and musician. Alecia has worked with bluegrass legend Carl Jackson on all of her albums. Alecia was nominated for IBMA Female Vocalist of The Year in 2009.

== Touring ==
Nugent performed in Scarborough, Ontario, Canada in 2008 as part of the Bluegrass Sundays Winter Concert Series.

== Discography ==
=== Albums ===
Title	Details
Alecia Nugent	Release date: March 9, 2004; Label: Rounder Records
A Little Girl…A Big Four-Lane	Release date: February 28, 2006; Label: Rounder Records
Hillbilly Goddess	Release date: March 24, 2009; Label: Rounder Records

=== Music videos ===
Year	Video	Director
2009	"Don't Tell Me"	Glenn Sweitzer
