= 1431 in France =

- Decades: 1410s; 1420s; 1430s; 1440s; 1450s
- See also: History of France; Timeline of French history; List of years in France

Events from the year 1431 in France.

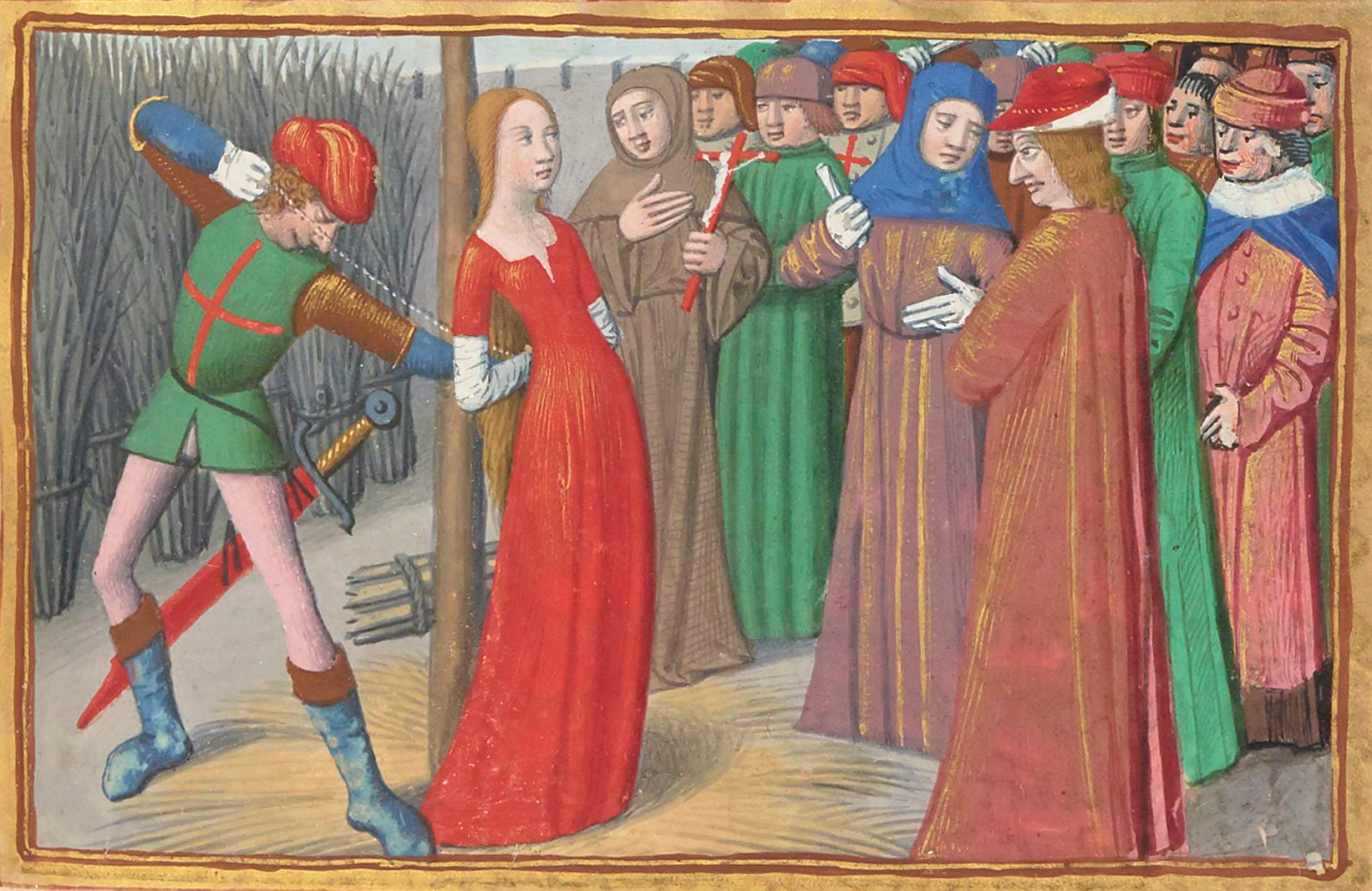
The execution of Jeanne d’Arc, from Les Vigiles de Charles VII, by Martial d'Auvergne.

== Incumbents ==
- Monarch – Charles VII

== Events ==
- 21 February – The trial of Joan of Arc for heresy begins in Rouen.
- 30 May – Having been found guilty Joan of Arc is executed
- 2 July – Battle of Bulgnéville between René I d'Anjou and Antoine de Vaudémont over the Duchy of Lorraine.
- 16 December – Henry VI of England is crowned King of France at Notre-Dame de Paris
- Unknown – The University of Poitiers is founded.

== Births ==
- François Villon, poet (died c.1463)

== Deaths ==
- Charles II, Duke of Lorraine (born 1364)
- Joan of Arc (born c.1412)
- Arnaud Guillaume de Barbazan, soldier (born 1360)
