= Arnaud Guillaume de Barbazan =

Arnaud Guillaume (also Arnault Guilhem), Seigneur de Barbazan, (1360 – 1431) was a counsellor and butler to Charles VII of France and later a general during the Hundred Years' War who earned for himself the name of the Irreproachable Knight.

He was born in Barbazan-Dessus, Hautes-Pyrénées, and was one of the chief Armagnacs, a fervent partisan of Charles VII, and a sworn enemy of the Burgundians. He defended Melun in 1420 against the English, who captured him and kept him as a prisoner of war until 1430. Upon his release, he continued to fight against Burgundy and England, finally dying in combat in the Battle of Bulgnéville in the Vosges mountains near the villages of Bulgnéville and Vaudoncourt.

Because of his heroic service to France and to the king in the many battles he had participated in, Barbazan was buried at the Saint Denis Basilica next to the king himself, after a state funeral of a type usually reserved for kings.
