= 1444 in France =

- Decades: 1420s; 1430s; 1440s; 1450s; 1460s
- See also: History of France; Timeline of French history; List of years in France

Events from the year 1444 in France.

== Incumbents ==
- Monarch – Charles VII

== Events ==
- 22 May - Treaty of Tours signed between England and France who agree to a five-year truce in the Hundred Years War
- 26 August - French troops fight the Battle of St. Jakob an der Birs against the Old Swiss Confederacy
