= 1448 in France =

- Decades: 1420s; 1430s; 1440s; 1450s; 1460s
- See also: History of France; Timeline of French history; List of years in France

Events from the year 1448 in France.

== Incumbents ==
- Monarch – Charles VII

== Events ==
- January 15 – Le Mans is not returned to the French by this deadline, as outlined in the Treaty of Tours, resulting in the French army surrounding the city.
- December 22 – Henry VI cedes the lands of Maine and Anjou under threat of military force from Charles VII following refusal to fulfil the terms of the Treaty of Tours.

=== Date unknown ===
- Edmund Beaufort, Duke of Somerset is appointed as commander in occupied France replacing Richard, Duke of York.
- A gathering of the Estates General, a legislative and consultative assembly of the different classes (or estates) of French subjects, is called by Charles VII at Bourges.

== Births ==
- July 7 – Nicholas I, Duke of Lorraine (d. 1473).

=== Date unknown ===
- Gaston de Foix, Earl of Kendal and Count of Candale and Benauges (d. 1500).

== Deaths ==
- March 18 – Catherine Quicquat, woman executed for witchcraft.
- July 7 – Marie de Bourbon, Duchess of Calabria (b. 1428).
