= 1424 in France =

- Decades: 1400s; 1410s; 1420s; 1430s; 1440s
- See also: History of France; Timeline of French history; List of years in France

Events from the year 1424 in France.

== Incumbents ==
- Monarch – Charles VII

== Events ==
- 17 August - The English army under John, Duke of Bedford win a major victory at the Battle of Verneuil over Franco-Scottish forces as part of the Hundred Years War.

== Births ==
- Unknown - Félizé Regnard, courtier and royal mistress (died 1474)

== Deaths ==
- 17 August - John Stewart, Earl of Buchan, leader of the Scottish troops fighting for France in the Hundred Years War (born 1381)
- 17 August - John VIII of Harcourt, nobleman and soldier (born 1396)
- Unknown - Joan II, Countess of Auvergne (born 1378)
