= 1447 in France =

- Decades: 1420s; 1430s; 1440s; 1450s; 1460s
- See also: History of France; Timeline of French history; List of years in France

Events from the year 1447 in France.

== Incumbents ==
- Monarch – Charles VII

== Events ==
- Unknown - Joan, daughter of Charles VII, marries John, Duke of Bourbon

== Deaths ==
- Jenson Salvart, contractor (born 1398)
