= 1449 in France =

- Decades: 1420s; 1430s; 1440s; 1450s; 1460s
- See also: History of France; Timeline of French history; List of years in France

Events from the year 1449 in France.

== Incumbents ==
- Monarch – Charles VII

== Events ==
- March 24 – Hundred Years' War: English forces capture Fougères in Brittany.
- May – Hundred Years' War:
  - The French recapture Gerberoy
  - The French recapture Cognac
  - The French recapture Saint-Mégrin
  - The French recapture Conches following the capture of Château de Conches-en-Ouche led by Robert de Floques
  - The French recapture Pont-de-l'Arche
- July – Hundred Years' War: The French invade Normandy in the Normandy campaign of 1449-1450.
- August 25 – The French recapture Verneuil after the Siege of Verneuil from July 19 – August 25, 1449.
- September – Gaston IV, Count of Foix, favouring the King of France, initiates the reconquest of Guyenne by taking Château de Mauléon.
- October 29 – The French recapture Rouen from the English which the English captured in the 1418/1419 siege of Rouen.

== Births ==
- October 29 – Peter of Foix the Younger (Fr.: Pierre de Foix, le jeune), French Roman Catholic bishop and cardinal (d. 1490)

== Deaths ==
=== Date unknown ===
- Jean de la Trémoille, seigneur of Jonvelle, Grand Master and Grand Chamberlain to the dukes of Burgundy John the Fearless and Philip the Good.
- Barthélémy Texier, Master of the Order of Preachers from 1426.
- Tanneguy du Châtel, Grand Master of France and murderer of Duke John the Fearless.
