= Battle of Bulgnéville =

Coordinates: 48.2086°N 5.8350°E

- Part of the War of the succession of Lorraine, the Armagnac–Burgundian Civil War, and the Hundred Years' War
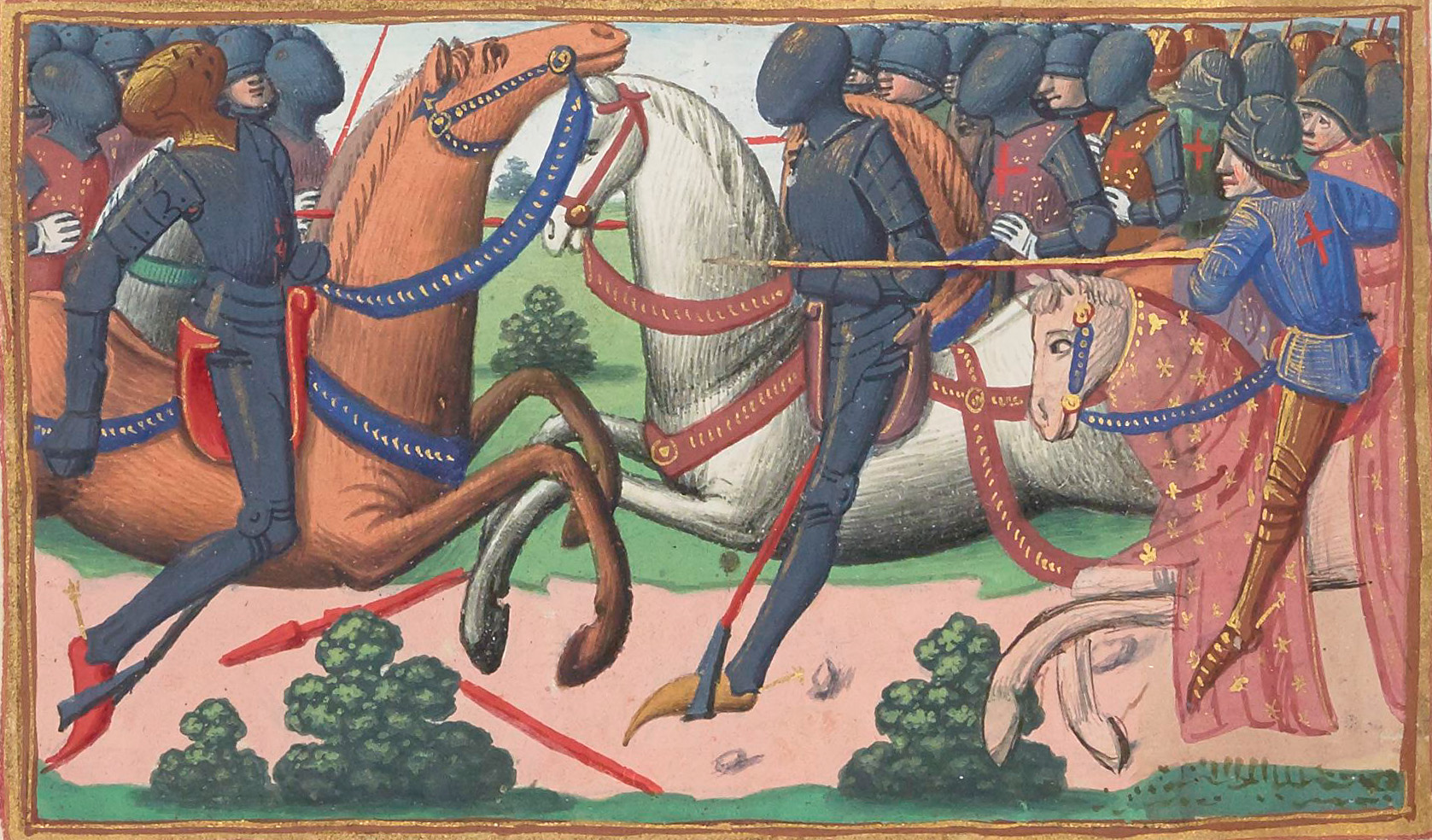
- 15th century illustration of the battle
Date	2 July 1431
Location	Near Bulgnéville and Vaudoncourt in Lorraine
Action	Dispute over the succession of the Duchy of Lorraine
Result	Victory for Antoine de Vaudémont

Belligerents
County of Vaudémont; Duchy of Burgundy; Kingdom of England	Duchy of Bar; Armagnac party of the Kingdom of France

Commanders and leaders
Antoine de Vaudémont; Antoine de Toulongeon	René of Anjou (POW); Arnaud de Barbazan †

Strength
9,000	10,500

The Battle of Bulgnéville was fought on 2 July 1431. The battle was fought between two cousins, René I d'Anjou and Antoine de Vaudémont, over partition of the Duchy of Lorraine after the death of Duke Charles II. Although René was defeated and captured, the result was reversed by diplomatic means in the years following.

== Background ==
Duke Charles II was determined in the absence of a son that his daughter Isabella was to inherit from him. In 1420 she was married to Rene d'Anjou, who, a year earlier, had taken over the Duchy of Bar. Charles' will was contested by his nephew, Antoine de Vaudémont, in his own lifetime, after which Charles disinherited him. Charles made attacks on Antoine's property which came to nothing, because Antoine had found a powerful ally in Philip the Good, Duke of Burgundy. After Charles' death in January 1431, Antoine renewed his fight for the duchy.

== The armies ==
Antoine de Vaudémont had 4000 cavalry and 5000 infantry, largely Burgundian but also Picards and a small contingent of English, under the command of Antoine de Toulongeon, the Marshal of the Duke of Burgundy. Duke René had support from his brother-in-law, the French king Charles VII, who sent an army of 4000 cavalry and 6000 infantry under the command of the old soldier Arnaud Guillaume de Barbazan. Unfortunately, the French troops were inexperienced and not properly integrated. Pfalzgraf Ludwig III, brother-in-law of the deceased duke, sent 500 knights.

== The battle ==
The Burgundian army had carried out a chevauchée into Lorraine and were withdrawing, pursued by the army of Duke René. The two forces met one kilometer south of Vaudoncourt. Vaudémont's army placed themselves on a gentle slope, with trees and a stream behind to cover their rear. The army dismounted and the horses and baggage were placed to the rear of the army. The army's archers, mainly Picards, were deployed behind stakes on the flanks and in front of the men-at-arms in the centre. The Burgundians also deployed cannons with their archers.

Duke Renés' army dismounted, except for a body of 200 lances on their left, and advanced to the attack. They were subjected to a cannonade and volleys of arrows, which caused the inexperienced troops to waiver. The Burgundians seeing this attacked down the hill and Duke René's army broke and fled, leaving 1000 men dead. The battle was very short, taking at most an hour, the critical part only a quarter of an hour.

Barbazan was killed (he was later buried on the orders of Charles VII in the Basilica of Saint-Denis, the necropolis of the kings of France). René d'Anjou, however, fell into the hands of Toulongeon, who passed him on to the Duke of Burgundy. His captivity was to be long and ultimately expensive.

== Results ==
Antoine de Vaudémont believed himself the victor, but could not take over the rule of Lorraine, as the Holy Roman Emperor Sigismund opposed him. Sigismund declared against Vaudémont at an arbitration court in Basel in 1434, awarding Lorraine to René. Philip of Burgundy arranged that a marriage be contracted between René's daughter, Yolande, and Antoine's son Frederick which, due to their youth, was only fulfilled in 1445. The marriage of René's heir John and Mary de Bourbon, Philip's niece, in 1444, gave additional stability to the peace.
