= Alexandre de Berneval =

French architect

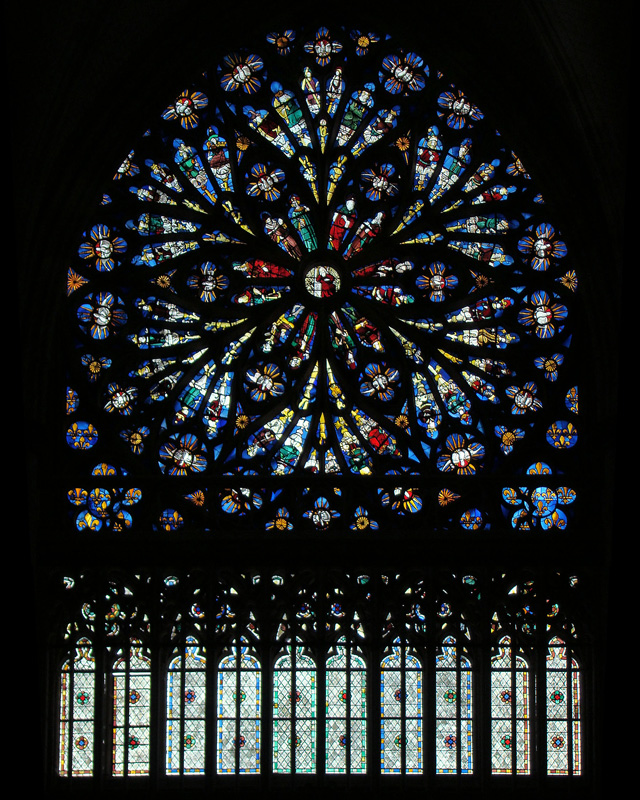
Church of Saint Ouen, Rouen. Rose window: Tree of Jesse by Alexandre de Berneval.

Alexandre de Berneval (1367 – 5 January 1440) was an architect and one of the foremost masons in Normandy in the early 15th century.

He is known to have visited England, in 1413, buying alabaster from "Newcastle-on-the-Tyne" for Estaud d’Estouteville, Abbot of La Trinité at Fécamp (1390–1423). In 1420, he was paid 200 livres tournois for a masonry tabernacle at Fécamp for the relic of the Pas de l’ange or Pas au Pèlerin, an impression in sandstone of the footstep of an angel at the dedication of the 10th-century church. Although damaged, the tabernacle is the earliest extant example of Berneval's style.

In Rouen, he worked for the French King in 1417 and, after the occupation of Rouen by the English in 1419, for the Duke of Bedford, who commissioned him to build a castle for Henry V. On this project he worked closely with Jenson Salvart (flourished 1398–1447), the master mason of Rouen Cathedral. In 1424, the two of them were implicated in a plot to overthrow the English by giving information about the castle to an insurgence led by Richard Mites or Ricart Mittes. Rouen Castle no longer exists.

Berneval was first recorded in the accounts of the Abbey Church of Saint-Ouen in 1424 and was master there until his death. The church contains his tomb. He is generally credited with the design of the south rose window and (probably) the south transept porch ("Portail des Marmousets"), in Gothic and Flamboyant style. Although scholars have attributed to him extensive work on the north and south transepts and the second stage of the crossing tower, the styles are too diverse to be the design of a single master.

The epitaph on his tomb in Saint-Ouen reads:

Cy gist maistre Alexandre de Berneval, maistre de machonerie du roy nostre sire au bailliage de rouen et de saint ouen qui trespassa le V^{e} de janvier mil CCCC et XL. Priez dieu pour luy. Amen.
Here lies Master Alexandre de Berneval, master of masonry of the king our sire in the bailliage of Rouen and of Saint Ouen who died the 5th of January 1440. Pray to God for him. Amen

Alexandre de Berneval was succeeded as architect at St Ouen by his son, Colin de Berneval. His effigy on their joint tomb shows him holding a tablet with a plan of the nave and main portal, the sections with which he was mainly involved.
