= 1436 in France =

- Decades: 1410s; 1420s; 1430s; 1440s; 1450s
- See also: History of France; Timeline of French history; List of years in France

Events from the year 1436 in France.

== Incumbents ==
- Monarch – Charles VII

== Events ==
- April - Paris is recaptured from the English by French forces during the Hundred Years War
- 25 June - Scottish princess Margaret Stewart marries the future Louis XI in Tours
- 29 July - French forces abandon their Siege of Calais
