= 1433 in France =

- Decades: 1410s; 1420s; 1430s; 1440s; 1450s
- See also: History of France; Timeline of French history; List of years in France

Events from the year 1433 in France.

== Incumbents ==
- Monarch – Charles VII

== Births ==
- Francis II, Duke of Brittany (died 1488)
- Charles the Bold, Duke of Burgundy (died 1477)

== Deaths ==
- Jean de Brosse, courtier (born 1375)
- Joan of France, Duchess of Brittany (born 1391)
