= 1428 in France =

- Decades: 1400s; 1410s; 1420s; 1430s; 1440s
- See also: History of France; Timeline of French history; List of years in France

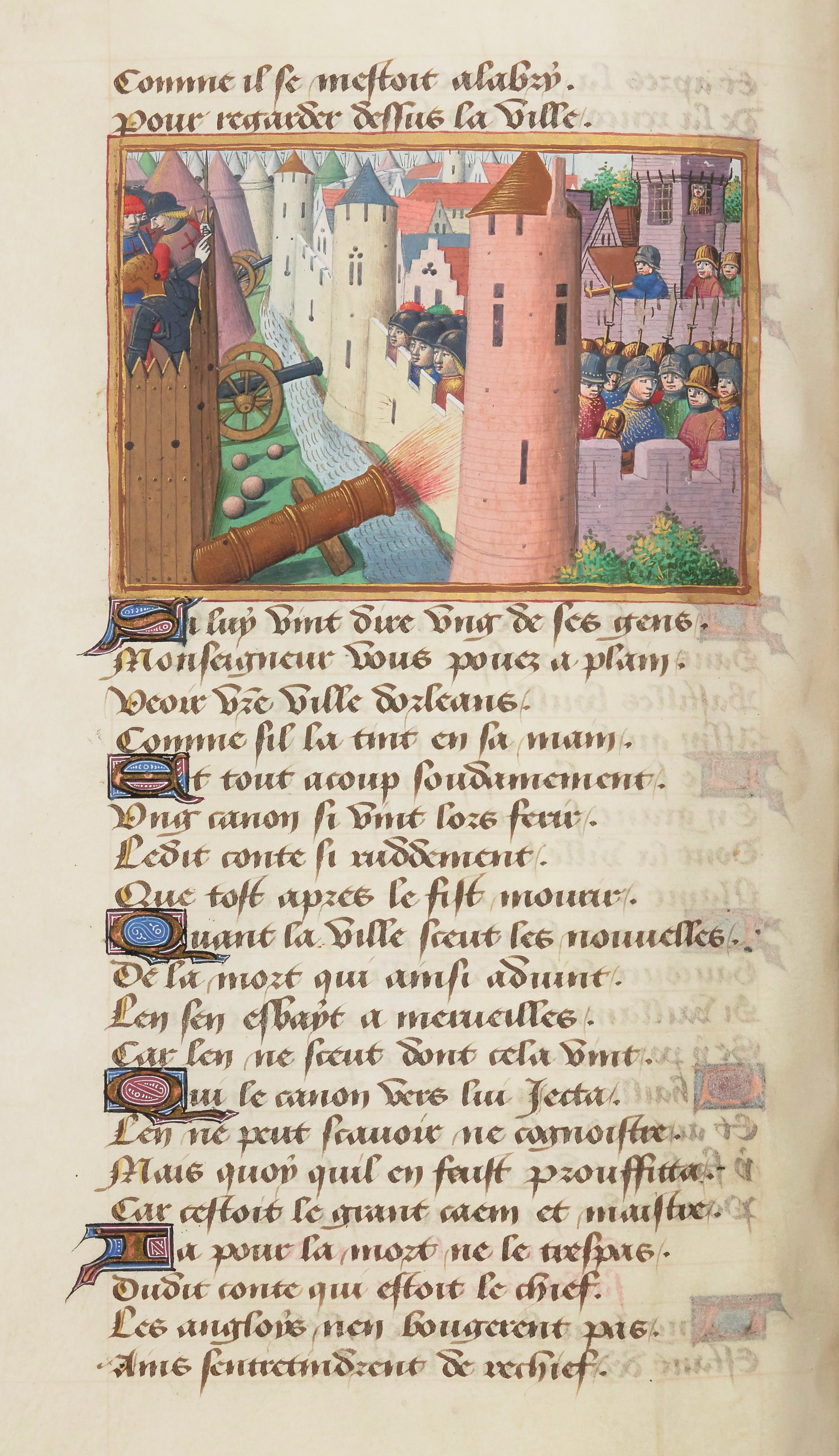
The siege of Orléans in 1428

Events from the year 1428 in France.

== Incumbents ==
- Monarch – Charles VII

== Events ==
- 12 October – English forces begin the siege of Orléans during the Hundred Years War.

== Births ==
- 2 November – Yolande, Duchess of Lorraine, ruler of Lorraine (d.1483)
- August – Radegonde of Valois, French Princess (d.1445)

== Deaths ==
- 6 November – Guillaume Fillastre, Cardinal (born 1348)
