= 1443 in France =

- Decades: 1420s; 1430s; 1440s; 1450s; 1460s
- See also: History of France; Timeline of French history; List of years in France

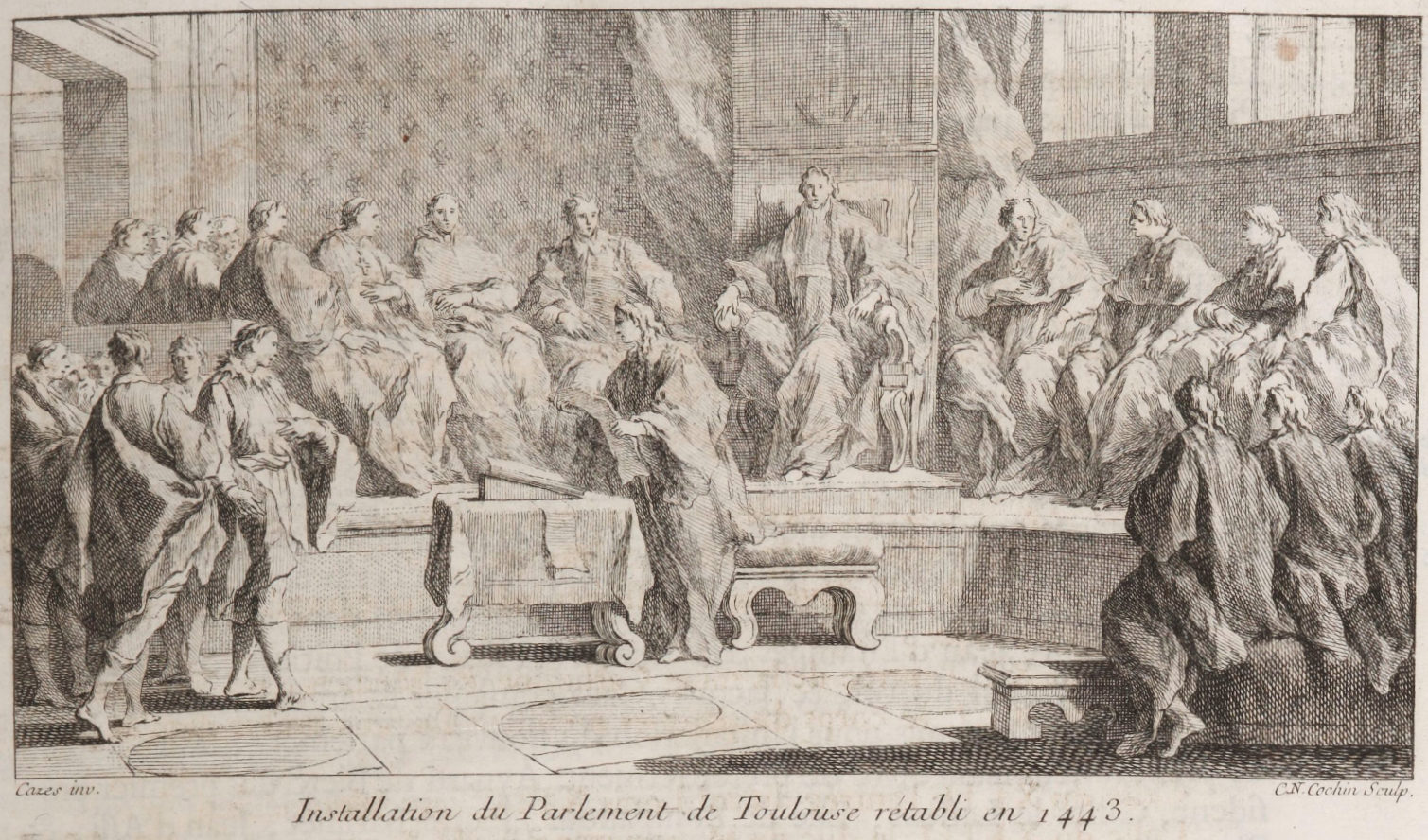
Installation of Parliament of Tolouse (1443)

Events from the year 1443 in France.

== Incumbents ==
- Monarch – Charles VII

== Events ==
- August - John Beaufort, 1st Duke of Somerset lands with 8,000 strong English force at Cherbourg-en-Cotentin during the Hundred Years War
- Unknown - The Hospices de Beaune is founded

== Births ==
- 1 December - Magdalena of France, princess (died 1495)

== Deaths ==
- 28 January - Robert le Maçon, royal advisor (born 1365)
