= 1432 in France =

- Decades: 1410s; 1420s; 1430s; 1440s; 1450s
- See also: History of France; Timeline of French history; List of years in France

Events from the year 1432 in France.

== Incumbents ==
- Monarch – Charles VII

== Events ==
- 6 January – The siege of Pouancé begins during the Hundred Years' War
- Unknown – The University of Caen is founded in Normandy

== Deaths ==
- Joan of Valois, Duchess of Alençon (born 1409)
