= 1437 in France =

- Decades: 1410s; 1420s; 1430s; 1440s; 1450s
- See also: History of France; Timeline of French history; List of years in France

Events from the year 1437 in France.

== Incumbents ==
- Monarch – Charles VII

== Events ==
- 12 November - Charles VII and his son the future Louis XI enter Paris in triumph following its recapture from the English during the Hundred Years War
