= 1439 in France =

- Decades: 1410s; 1420s; 1430s; 1440s; 1450s
- See also: History of France; Timeline of French history; List of years in France

Events from the year 1439 in France.

== Incumbents ==
- Monarch – Charles VII

== Events ==
- 11 June - Catherine of France, Countess of Charolais is betrothed to Charles the Bold of Burgundy. They marry the following year.
- 2 November - A Great Ordinance is adopted by the Estates-General, granting the king the exclusive right to raise troops, and establishing the taxation measure known as the taille, in support of a standing army, foundation of the Compagnie d'ordonnance.
- November - The wolves of Paris terrorize the city, led by Courtaud.
- Undated - Strasbourg Cathedral is completed.
