= 1429 in France =

- Decades: 1400s; 1410s; 1420s; 1430s; 1440s
- See also: History of France; Timeline of French history; List of years in France

Events from the year 1429 in France.

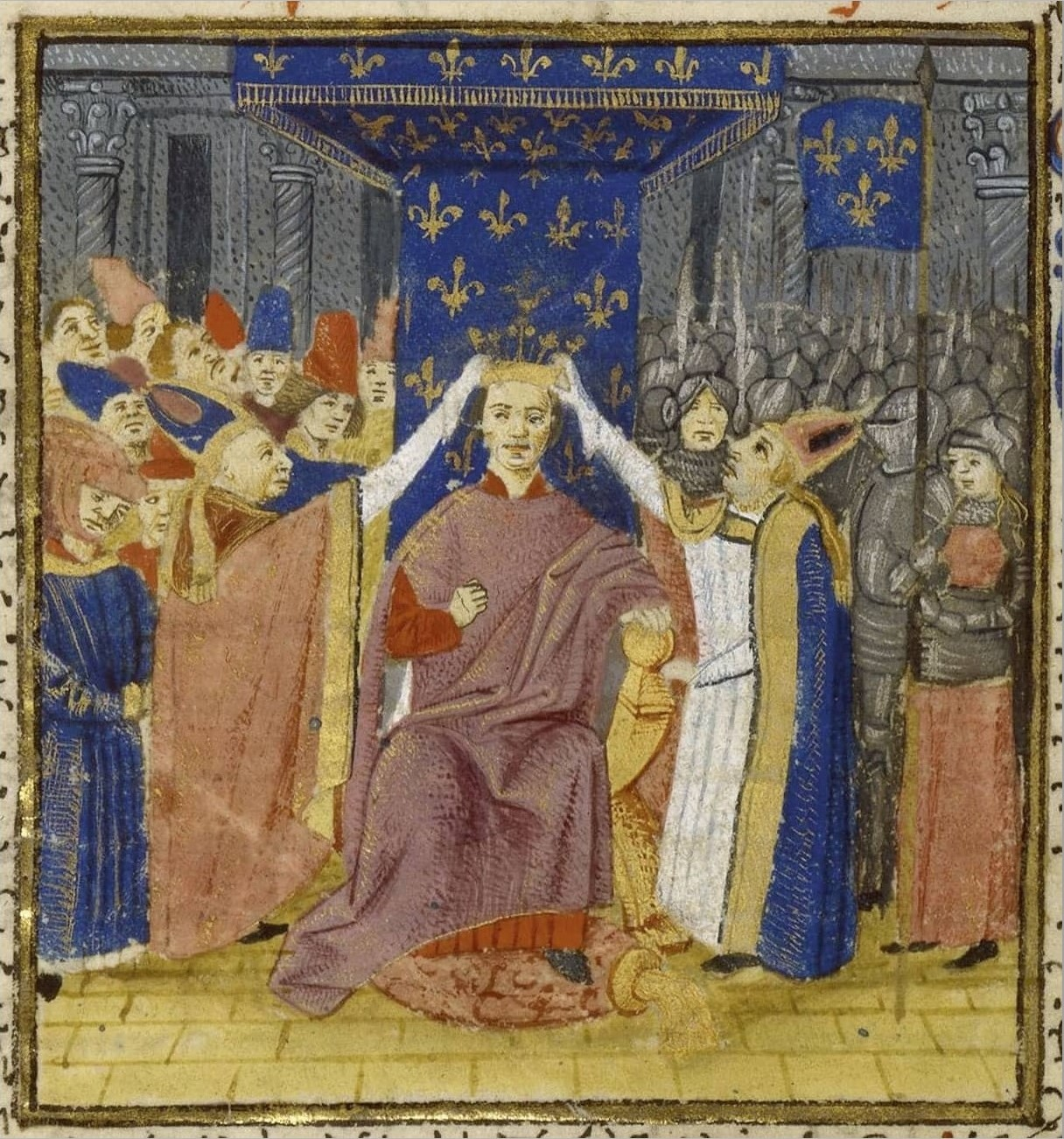
The coronation of Charles VII, with Joan of Arc (far right) holding the banner of the King of France.

== Incumbents ==
- Monarch – Charles VII

== Events ==
- 12 February – Battle of the Herrings during the Hundred Years War
- 29 April – Joan of Arc arrives to relieve the siege of Orléans.
- 7 May – The Tourelles, the last English siege fortification at Orléans, falls. Joan of Arc becomes the hero of the battle by returning, wounded, to lead the final charge.
- 8 May – The English army abandons the siege of Orléans.
- 18 June – At the Battle of Patay the English are beaten forcing them to withdraw from the Loire Valley.
- 17 July – Charles VII is crowned as King of France at the traditional site of Reims.
- 8 September – Joan of Arc leads a failed attempt to capture Paris.
- Unknown – The future Louis XI becomes Dauphin of France.

== Deaths ==
- 12 July – Jean Gerson, scholar (born 1363)
- Unknown – John Stewart of Darnley, Scottish-born Nobleman and soldier and French ally (born 1380)
