= 1446 in France =

- Decades: 1420s; 1430s; 1440s; 1450s; 1460s
- See also: History of France; Timeline of French history; List of years in France

Events from the year 1446 in France.

== Incumbents ==
- Monarch – Charles VII

== Births ==
- 3 May - Margaret of York, English-born woman married to Charles the Bold, Duke of Burgundy (died 1503)
- 26 December Charles, Duke of Berry, Nobleman (died 1472)

== Deaths ==
- 6 May - Georges de La Trémoille, courtier (born 1382)
