= 1425 in France =

- Decades: 1400s; 1410s; 1420s; 1430s; 1440s
- See also: History of France; Timeline of French history; List of years in France

Events from the year 1425 in France.

== Incumbents ==
- Monarch – Charles VII

== Deaths ==
- 17 September – Bonne of Artois, Duchess of Burgundy (born 1396)
