= Brouère =

French cheese

- Country of origin: France
- Region: Vosges
- Source of milk: Cows
- Texture: firm

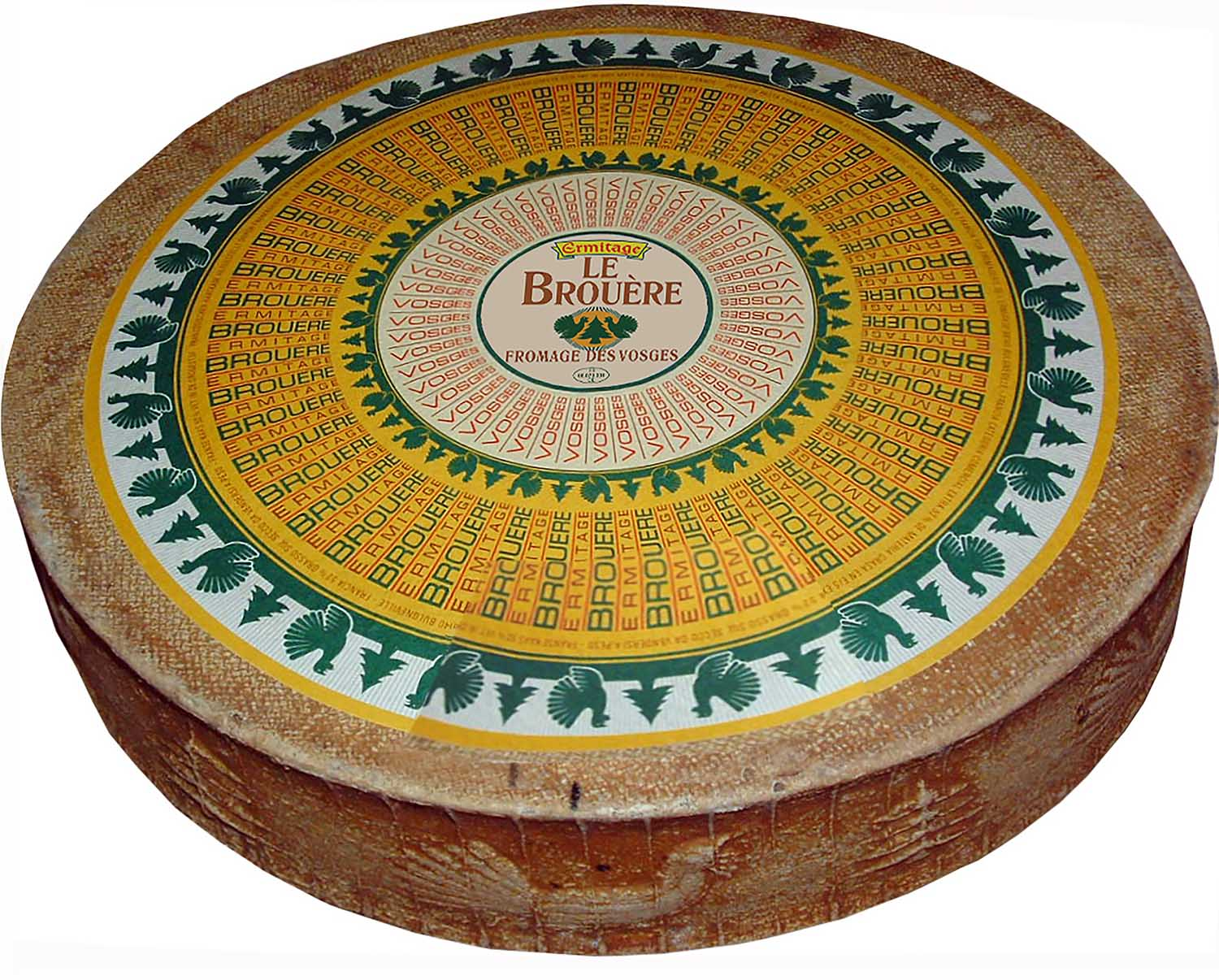
Brouere Ermitage

Le Brouère is a French cheese, originally from Lorraine. It is made by the dairy of the Bulgnéville hermitage in Vosges département. A typical round is about 43 centimetres (17 in) in diameter and weighs 12 kilograms (26 lb). It is shaped in wooden molds with patterns created by an artisan sculptor. Maturation time is 4 to 7 months. It is considered a variant of Gruyère.

A wheel was placed into orbit on December 8, 2010, on board the SpaceX Dragon capsule in a tribute to Monty Python's cheese shop sketch.
