= 1430 in France =

- Decades: 1410s; 1420s; 1430s; 1440s; 1450s
- See also: History of France; Timeline of French history; List of years in France

Events from the year 1430 in France.

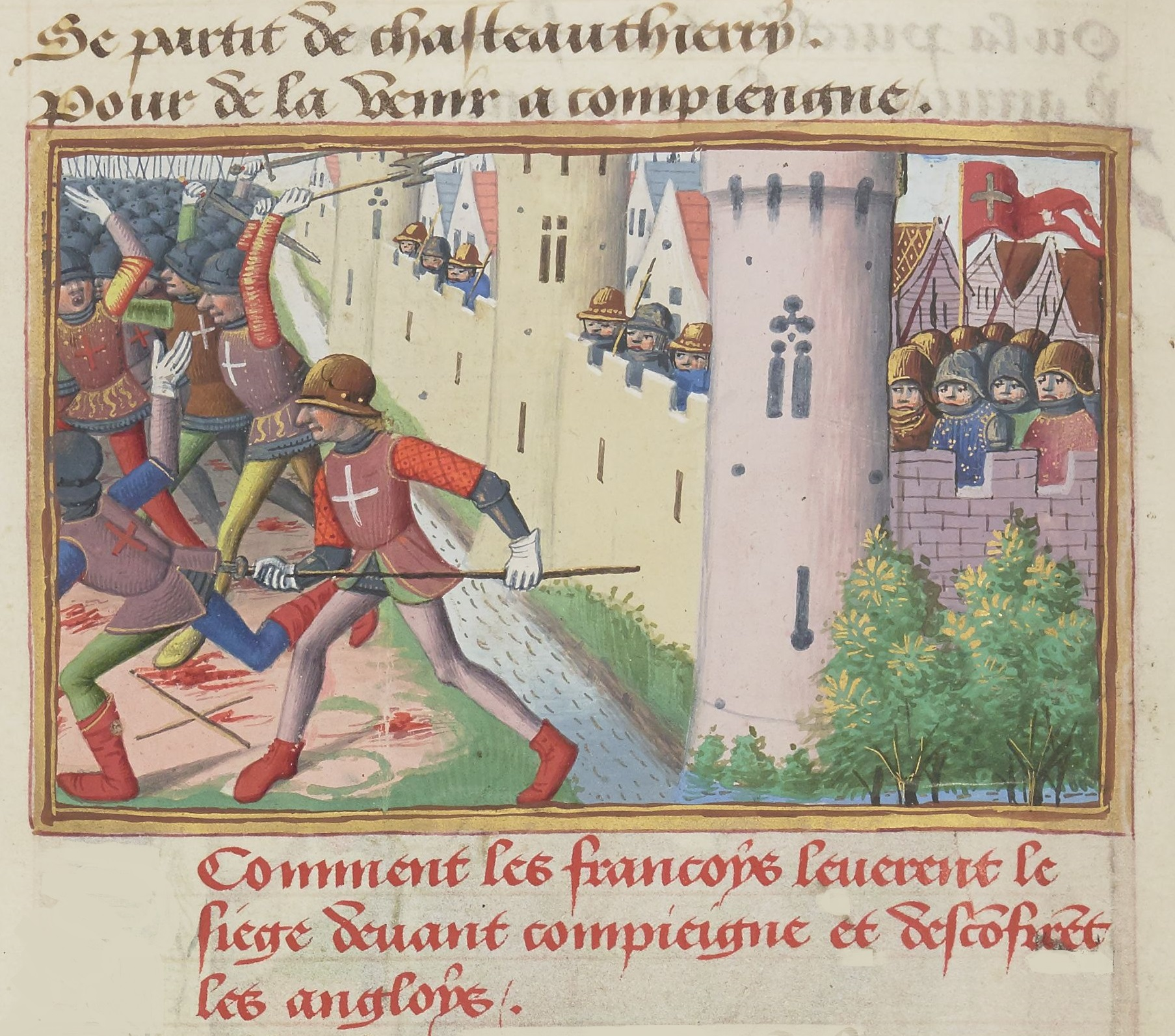
Siege of Compiègne by Martial d'Auvergne

== Incumbents ==
- Monarch – Charles VII

== Events ==
- 7 January – Philip the Good, Duke of Burgundy, marries Isabella of Portugal.
- 10 January – Philip the Good founds the Order of the Golden Fleece.
- 14 May – The French first attempt to relieve the siege of Compiègne during the Hundred Years War
- 23 May – Joan of Arc is captured by the Burgundians, while leading an army to relieve Compiègne.

== Births ==
- 23 March – Margaret of Anjou, future Queen of England (died 1482)

== Deaths ==
- 26 June – Louis I, Duke of Bar, bishop (born 1370)
- Alain Chartier, writer (born 1385)
