= 1438 in France =

- Decades: 1410s; 1420s; 1430s; 1440s; 1450s
- See also: History of France; Timeline of French history; List of years in France

Events from the year 1438 in France.

== Incumbents ==
- Monarch – Charles VII

== Events ==
- 7 July – Charles VII issues the Pragmatic Sanction of Bourges which regulates the relationship between France and the Papacy.

== Births ==
- 5 February – Margaret of Bourbon, noblewoman (died 1483)
