= 1435 in France =

- Decades: 1410s; 1420s; 1430s; 1440s; 1450s
- See also: History of France; Timeline of French history; List of years in France

Events from the year 1435 in France.

== Incumbents ==
- Monarch – Charles VII

== Events ==
- 2 February – The French-born René of Anjou becomes King of Naples upon the death of his predecessor queen Joanna II of Naples.
- 9 May – The Battle of Gerberoy is fought between France and England
- 21 September – The Treaty of Arras is agreed between Charles VII and Philip the Good leads to the end of the Anglo-Burgundian Alliance. This is major blow to long-term English hopes during the Hundred Years War
- 4 October – The siege of Saint-Denis ends in an English victory

== Births ==
- 4 May – Joan of France, Duchess of Bourbon, princes (died 1482)
- Unknown – Jean Molinet, writer and composer (died 1507)
- Unknown – Jean de Baudricourt, Marshal of France (died 1499)

== Deaths ==
- 24 September – Isabeau of Bavaria, former Queen of France (born 1370)
