= 1434 in France =

- Decades: 1410s; 1420s; 1430s; 1440s; 1450s
- See also: History of France; Timeline of French history; List of years in France

Events from the year 1434 in France.

== Incumbents ==
- Monarch – Charles VII

== Events ==
- 14 April – The foundation stone of Nantes Cathedral is laid

== Births ==
- 23 September – Yolande of Valois, princess (d.1478)

== Deaths ==
- November – Louis III of Anjou, Duke of Anjou(b.1403)

=== Date unknown ===
- John I, Duke of Bourbon, nobleman (b.1381)
