= 1440 in France =

- Decades: 1420s; 1430s; 1440s; 1450s; 1460s
- See also: History of France; Timeline of French history; List of years in France

Events from the year 1440 in France.

== Incumbents ==
- Monarch – Charles VII

== Events ==
- 2 July – Richard, Duke of York is appointed as commander of English forces in France for the second time
- 31 August – The siege of Tartas begins as part of the Hundred Years War
- 22 October – Gilles de Rais is executed in Nantes
- Unknown – The Praguerie rebellion breaks out against the rule of Charles VII
