= 1445 in France =

- Decades: 1420s; 1430s; 1440s; 1450s; 1460s
- See also: History of France; Timeline of French history; List of years in France

Events from the year 1445 in France.

== Incumbents ==
- Monarch – Charles VII

== Events ==
- 16 August - Margaret Stewart, Dauphine of France, the Scottish Princess and wife of the future Louis XI dies
- 20 October - Richard, Duke of York returns to England after five years as the English commander in France during the Hundred Years War

== Births ==
- Unknown - Guillaume Briçonnet, cardinal (died 1514)

== Deaths ==
- 16 August - Margaret Stewart, Dauphine of France (born 1424)
