= 1426 in France =

- Decades: 1400s; 1410s; 1420s; 1430s; 1440s
- See also: History of France; Timeline of French history; List of years in France

Events from the year 1426 in France.

== Incumbents ==
- Monarch – Charles VII

== Events ==
- 6 March - English forces under John, Duke of Bedford win a victory at the Battle of St. James in Normandy as part of the Hundred Years' War.

== Births ==
- 19 September - Marie of Cleves, Duchess of Orléans, mother of Louis XII (died 1487)
- Unknown - John II, Duke of Bourbon, soldier and Constable of France (died 1488)
- Unknown - Jacques de Luxembourg, Seigneur de Richebourg, French noble (died 1487)

== Deaths ==
- 16 February - Jean-Allarmet de Brogny, Cardinal (born 1342)
