= Guillaume Pontifs =

Guillaume Pontifs was a 15th-century French master builder.

== Biography ==
Pontifs was appointed master mason of the Rouen Cathedral on 17 May 1462 and succeeded Geoffroi Richier. He remained in this position until 1496. He introduced the systematic use of skylights in the cathedral, which inspired those at Évreux, Fécamp and Eu.

He continued the work of Jenson Salvart and Geoffroi Richier in the redevelopment of the north fenestration crossroads of the transept. He also completed the Saint-Romain tower with the construction of a high floor, covered with an axe roof with curved slate panels from 1468 to 1478. It housed nine bells.

From 1477 to 1479, he completely took over the canons' bookshop (chapter library) built by Jenson Salvart, and built the "Booksellers' staircase" which allowed access from the transept of the cathedral, in 1479. He made the first two flights. The following two were made in 1788, to access the new floor of the archives, while respecting the original Gothic style. The front gate of the Cour des Libraires was completed in 1484.

The chapel Saint-André/Saint-Barthélémy du Revestiaire is closed by a slightly curved stone fence, executed in 1479 at the request of the archdeacon Philippe de La Rose and a wrought iron door. It opens to the east on the great sacristy known as "sacristy of the canons" and to the west on the revestiaire (canons' changing room).

The western façade is visually unbalanced by the unique presence of the Saint-Romain tower. Pontiffs began late 1485 a tower south of the facade, the Butter Tower, under the archbishop's residence of Robert de Croismare. It was financed by the alms paid to compensate the right to use dairy products during the Lent. Jacques Le Roux, who succeeded him, completed it in 1506.

Guillaume Pontifs died in 1497.

== Works ==
- 1469-1477: Completion of the Saint-Romain tower
- 1479: Booksellers stairs
- 1480: Revestiaire closure
- 1482-1484: Front gate of the booksellers's
- 1485: Begins construction of the tour de Beurre
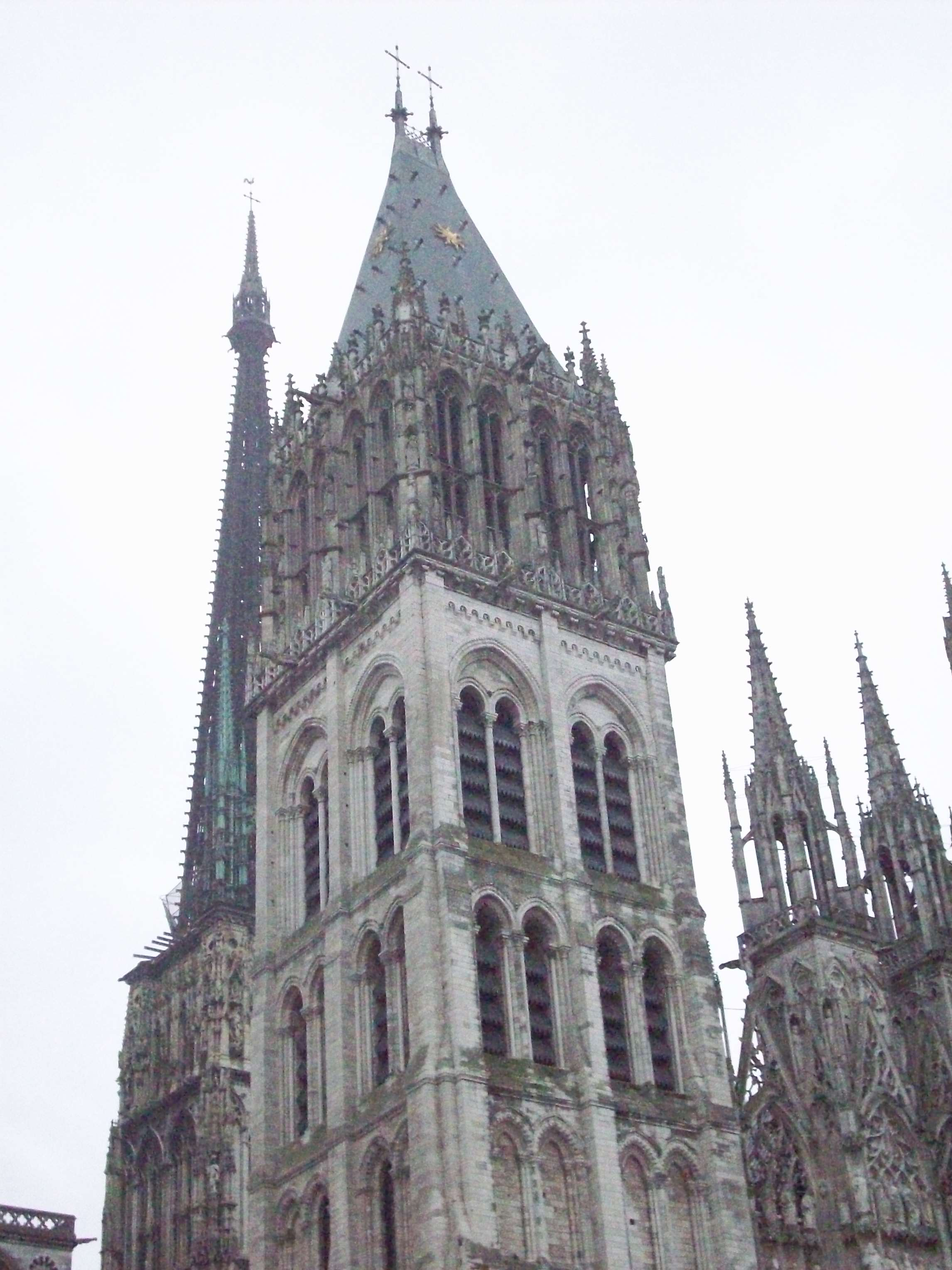
Tour Saint-Romain, whose top floor he built

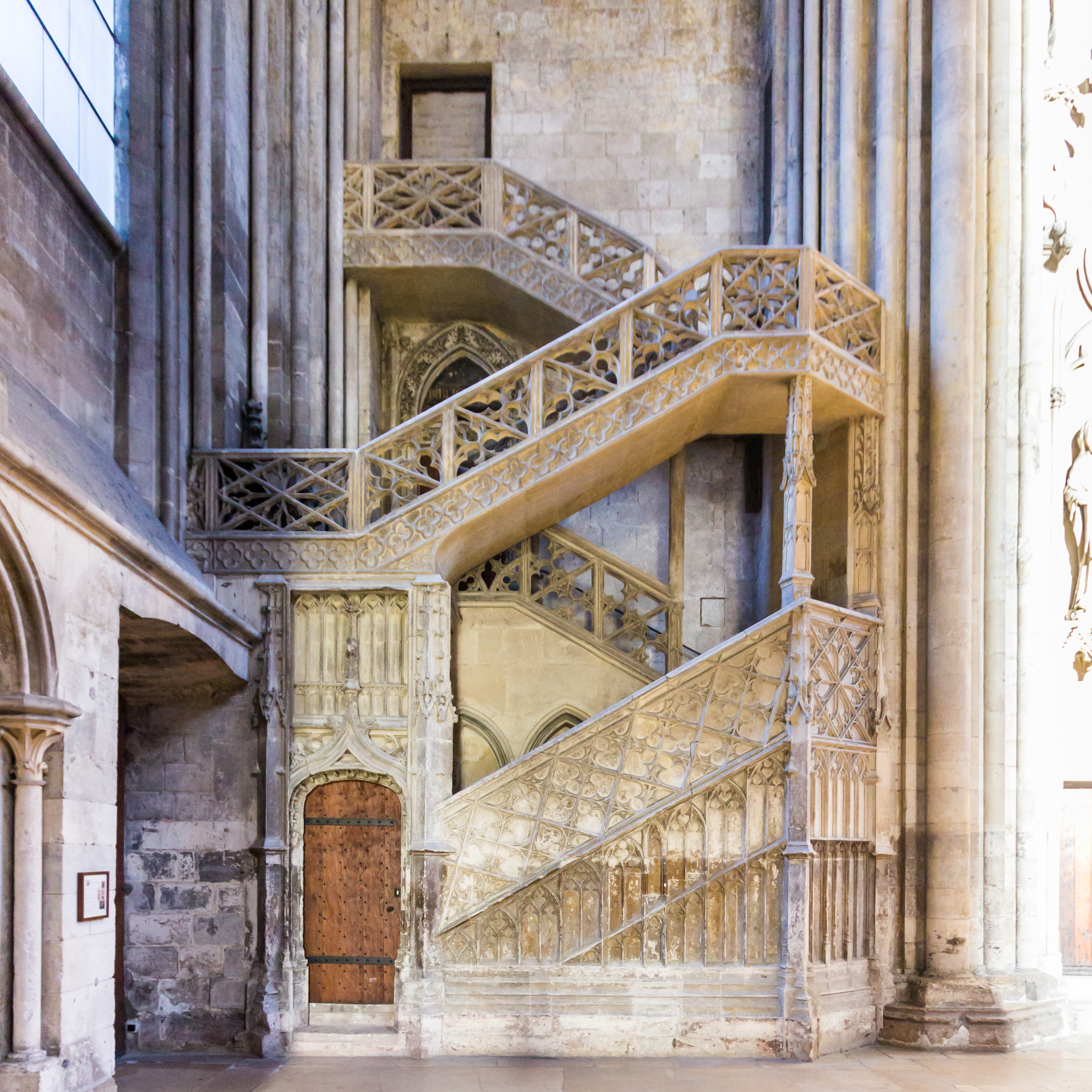
Staircase of the Booksellers, which can be accessed from the northern transept of the cathedral and made it possible to reach the library of the canons

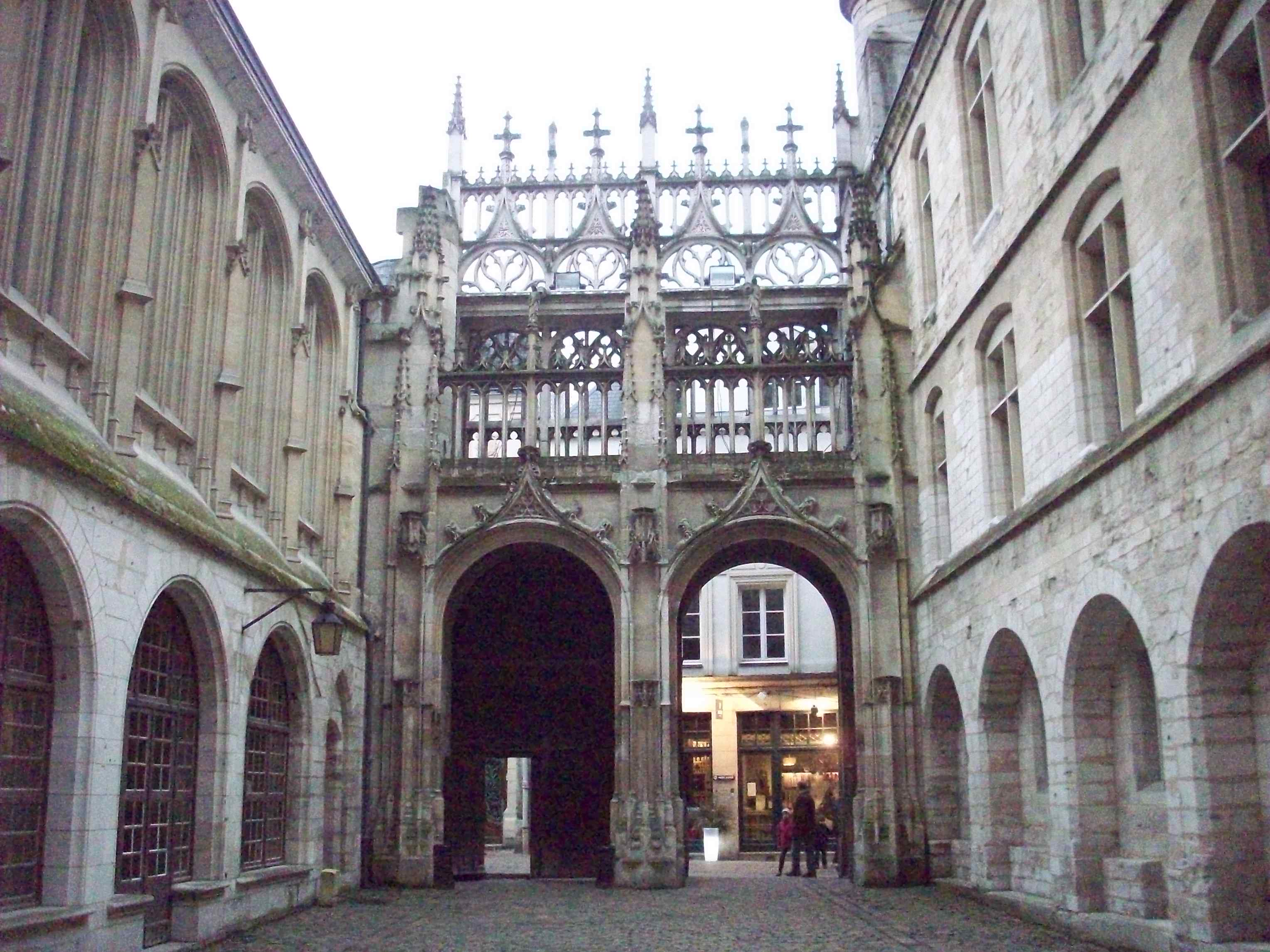
Back of the front gate of the courtyard of the Booksellers

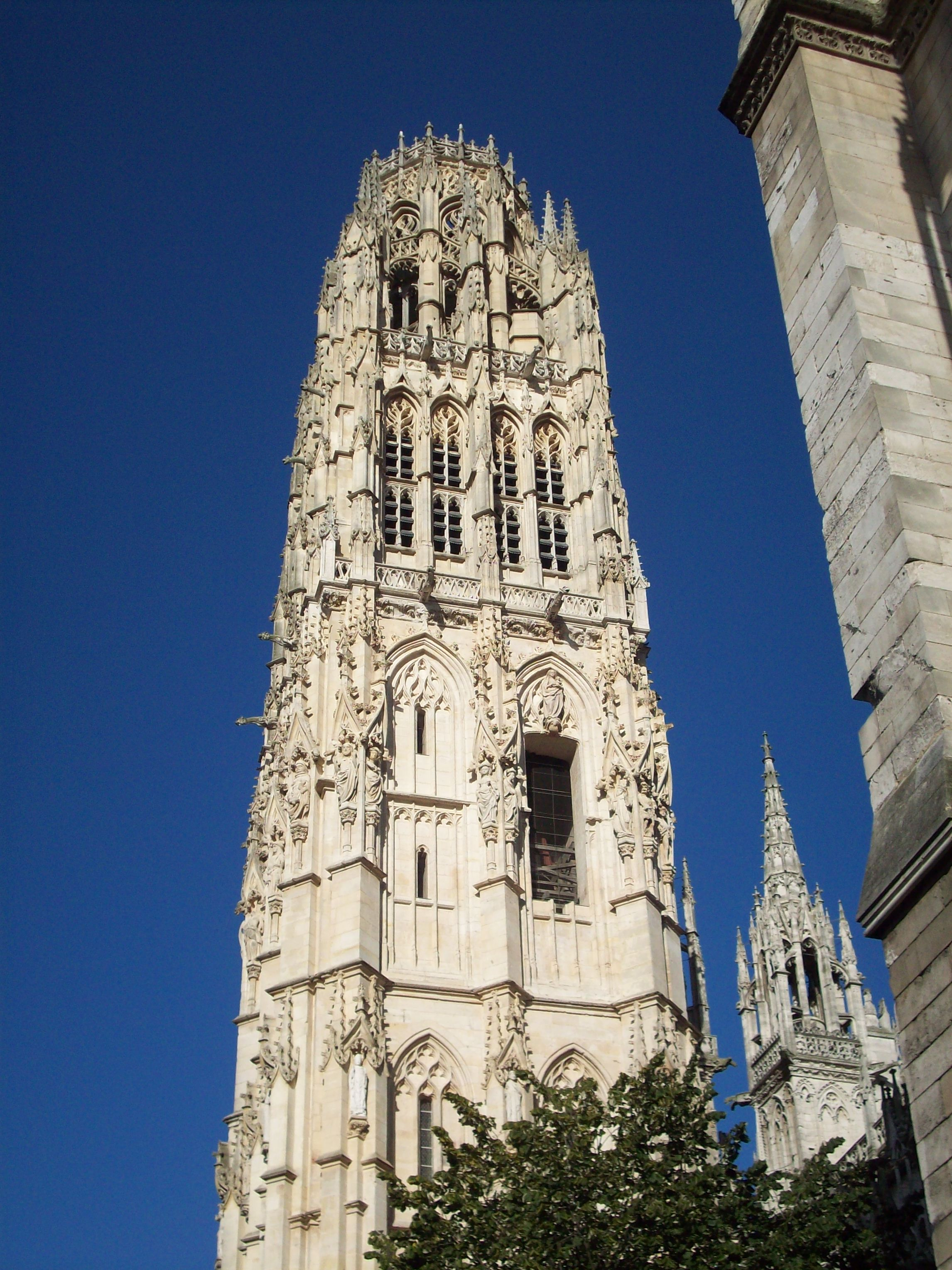
Tour du Beurre

== Sources ==
- Jacques Baudoin, La sculpture flamboyante en Normandie et Île-de-France, Nonette, éditions Créer, 1992, 354 pages, ISBN 2-902894-78-3, p. 60-61.

== Bibliography ==
- Lescroart, Yves (2000). La Cathédrale Notre-Dame de Rouen. Cathédrales de France (in French). Paris: Éditions du Patrimoine. p. 96. ISBN 978-2-85822-656-6.
- Baylé, Maylis (2001). "Rouen: cathédrale Notre-Dame". L’architecture normande au Moyen Âge; les étapes de la création (in French). Vol. 2. Luneray: Éditions Charles Corlet/Presses Universitaires de Caen. pp. 185–191. ISBN 2-84133-134-2.
- Bottineau-Fuchs, Yves (2001). "Cathédrale Notre-Dame". Haute-Normandie gothique; architecture religieuse (in French). Éditions A. et J. Picard. pp. 286–322. ISBN 2-7084-0617-5.
- Carment-Lanfry, Anne-Marie; Le Maho, Jacques (1977). La cathédrale Notre-Dame de Rouen; édition revue et complétée par Jacques Le Maho (in French). Mont-Saint-Aignan: Publications des Universités de Rouen et du Havre. p. 312. ISBN 978-2-87775-477-4.
