= 1427 in France =

- Decades: 1400s; 1410s; 1420s; 1430s; 1440s
- See also: History of France; Timeline of French history; List of years in France

Events from the year 1427 in France.

== Incumbents ==
- Monarch – Charles VII

== Births ==
- 29 May - Françoise d'Amboise, saint (died 1485)

== Deaths ==
- 17 April - John IV, Duke of Brabant (born 1403)
- Unknown - Amaury de Sévérac, soldier
