= 1442 in France =

- Decades: 1420s; 1430s; 1440s; 1450s; 1460s
- See also: History of France; Timeline of French history; List of years in France

Events from the year 1442 in France.

== Incumbents ==
- Monarch – Charles VII

== Deaths ==
- 29 August – John V, Duke of Brittany (born 1389)
- 18 December – Pierre Cauchon, bishop (born 1371)
