= 1423 in France =

- Decades: 1400s; 1410s; 1420s; 1430s; 1440s
- See also: History of France; Timeline of French history; List of years in France

Events from the year 1423 in France.

== Incumbents ==
- Monarch – Charles VII

== Events ==
- February 11 – Hundred Years War: The island of Tombelaine, off the coast of France, is taken by English forces in order to be used as a base to attack Mont Saint-Michel.
- April 13 - Hundred Years' War – Treaty of Amiens: A defensive agreement is signed between Burgundy, Brittany, and England.
- June 13 – Hundred Years' War: John, Duke of Bedford marries Anne of Burgundy, strengthening the Anglo-Burgundian alliance against France.
- July 31 – Hundred Years' War – Battle of Cravant: The French army is defeated at Cravant, on the banks of the River Yonne near Auxerre, by the English and their Burgundian allies.
- September 26 – Hundred Years' War: The Battle of La Brossinière is fought in France near Bourgon in what is now the Mayenne département. The English force of 2,800 men, under the command of Sir John De la Pole, is crushed by the armies of France, Anjou and Maine, and the English suffer more than 1,400 deaths.

== Births ==
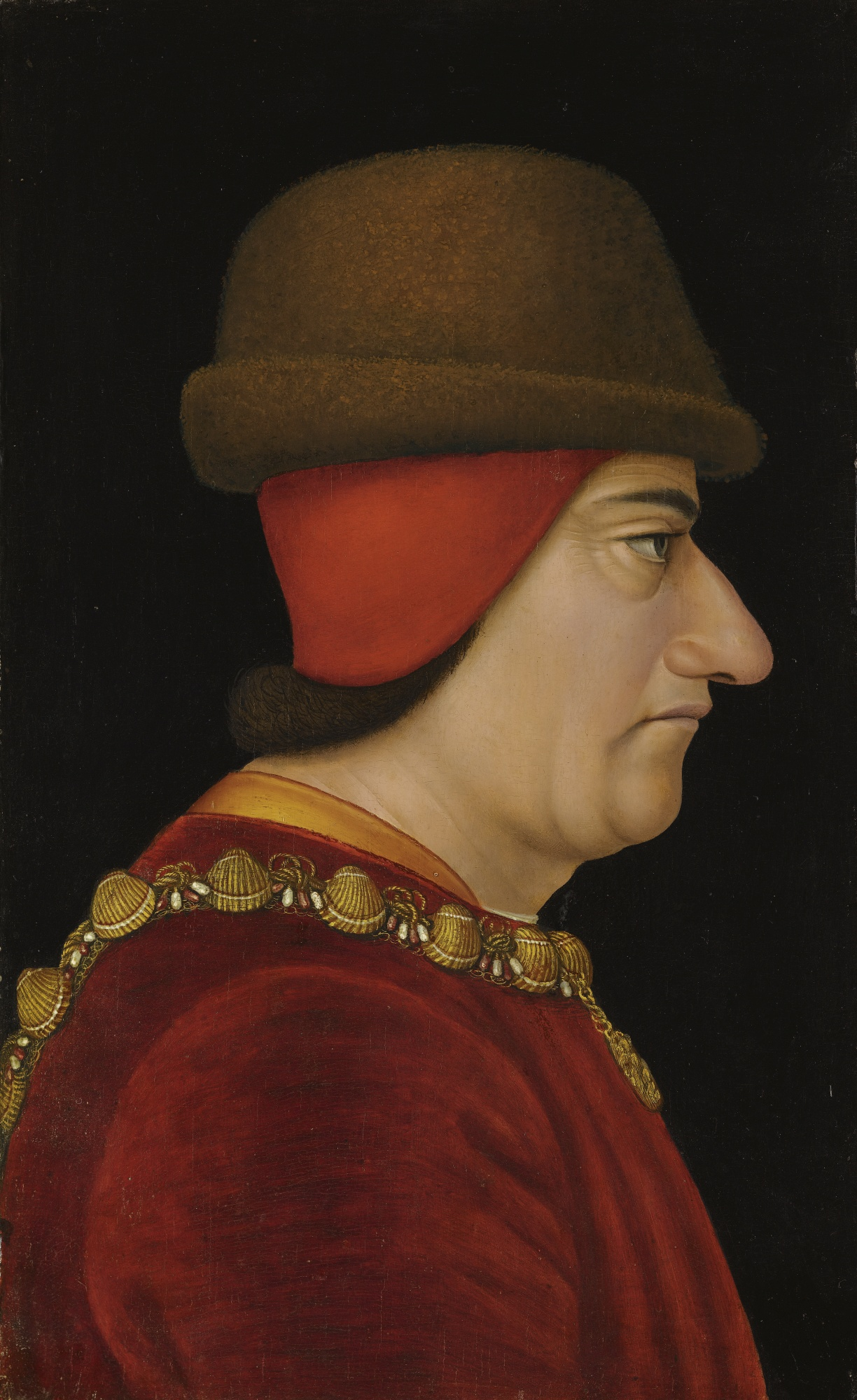
Louis XI, King of France 1461–1483

- 3 July – Louis XI (died 1483)

=== Full date missing ===
- Pierre d'Aubusson (d. 3 July 1503)
- Hélie de Bourdeilles, Franciscan, Archbishop of Tours and Cardinal, (d. 5 July 1484)
- Jean Daillon, nobleman and court official (d. 1481)

== Deaths ==
=== Full date missing ===
- Margaret of Bavaria (born 1363)
- Jean Courtecuisse, bishop (born c.1350)
