= 1441 in France =

- Decades: 1420s; 1430s; 1440s; 1450s; 1460s
- See also: History of France; Timeline of French history; List of years in France

Events from the year 1441 in France.

== Incumbents ==
- Monarch – Charles VII

== Events ==
- 7 June - The University of Bordeaux is founded
- June - Richard, Duke of York arrives in Normandy following his appointment as English commander in the Hundred Years War

== Births ==
- 11 November Charlotte of Savoy, wife of Louis XI (died 1483)

== Deaths ==
- 5 January - John II of Luxembourg, Count of Ligny, soldier (born 1392)
