= Barbazan-Dessus =

- Commune
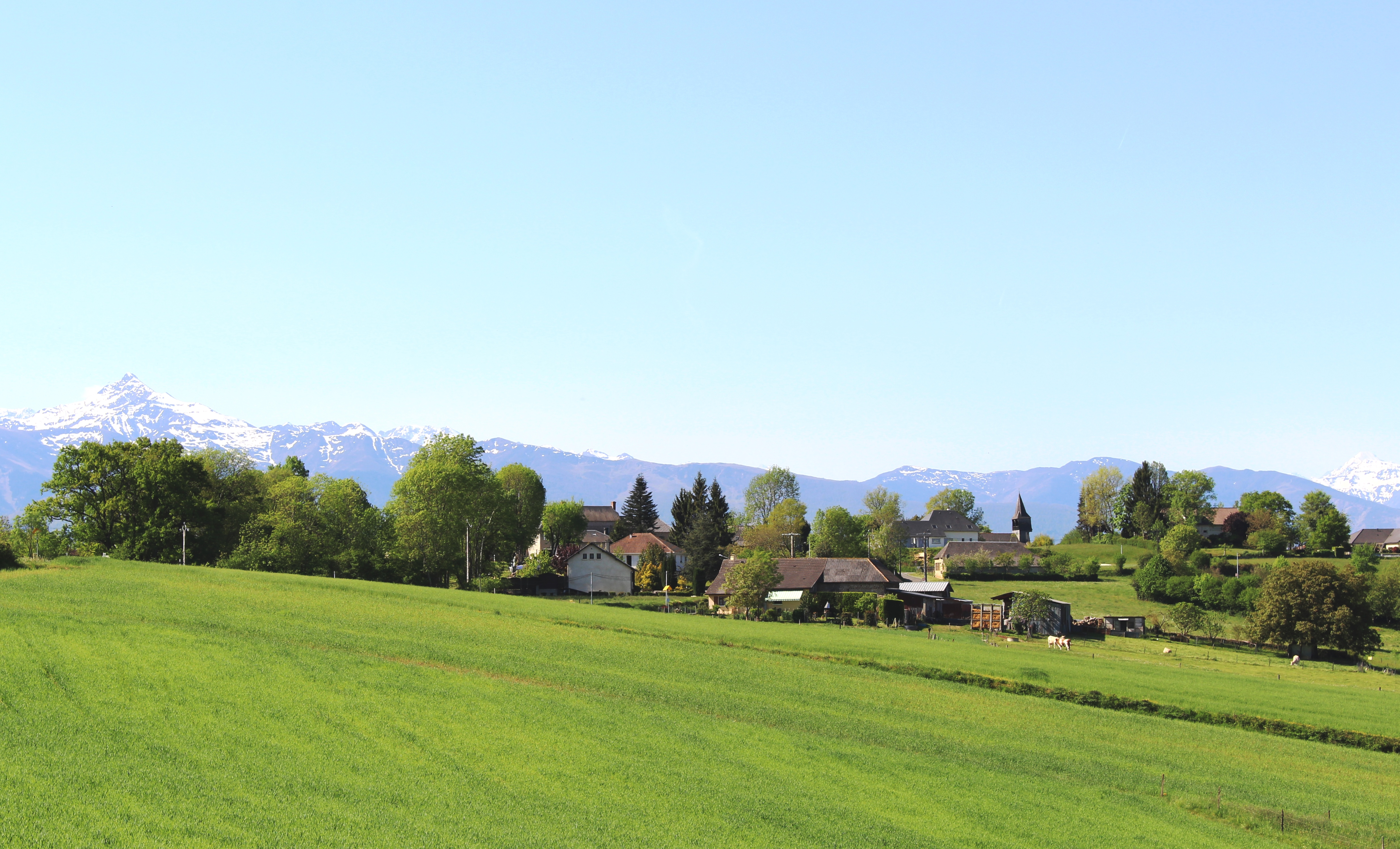

- Coat of arms
- Location of Barbazan-Dessus
- Location within France Location within Occitanie
- Coordinates: 43°09′54″N 0°08′30″E
- Country: France
- Region: Occitania
- Department: Hautes-Pyrénées
- Arrondissement: Tarbes
- Canton: La Vallée de l'Arros et des Baïses
- Intercommunality: Coteaux du Val d'Arros

Government
  - Mayor (2020–2026): Laurent Fourcade
- Area^{1}: 4.24 km^{2} (1.64 sq mi)
- Elevation: 500 m (1,600 ft)
- Highest elevation: 516 m (1,693 ft)
- Lowest elevation: 381 m (1,250 ft)
- Population (2023): 155
  - Density: 36.6/km^{2} (94.7/sq mi)
- Time zone: UTC+01:00 (CET)
  - Summer (DST): UTC+02:00 (CEST)
- INSEE/Postal code: 65063 /65360
- ^{1} French Land Register data, which excludes lakes, ponds, glaciers > 1 km^{2} (0.386 sq mi or 247 acres) and river estuaries.

Barbazan-Dessus is a commune in the Hautes-Pyrénées department in southwestern France.

== Population ==
Historical population
Year	Pop.	±% p.a.
1968	120	—
1975	133	+1.48%
1982	143	+1.04%
1990	141	−0.18%
1999	136	−0.40%
2007	134	−0.19%
2012	143	+1.31%
2017	165	+2.90%
2023	155	−1.04%
Source: INSEE

== See also ==
- Communes of the Hautes-Pyrénées department
