= Bulgnéville =

- Commune
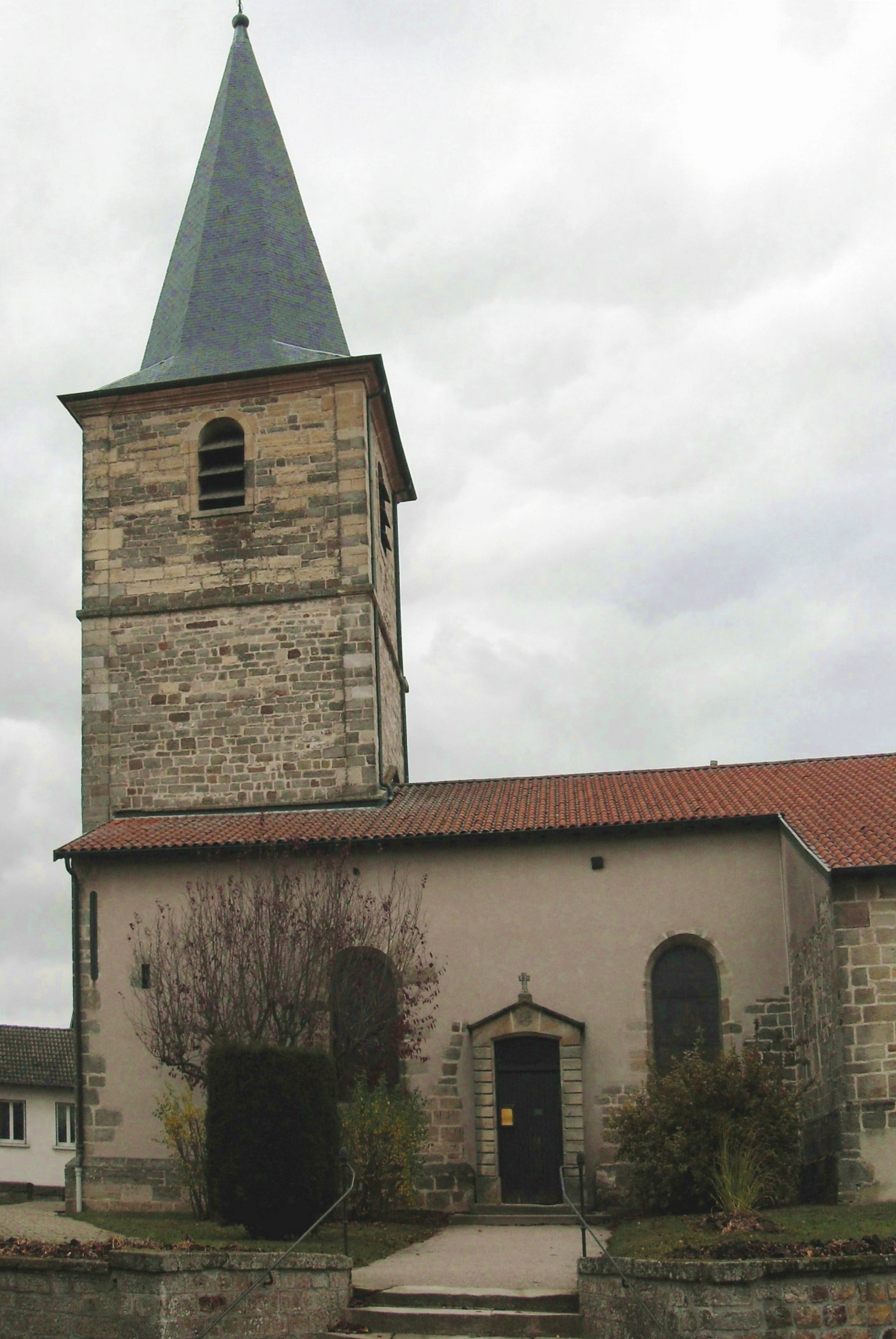
- The church in Bulgnéville

- Flag Coat of arms
- Location of Bulgnéville
- Location within France Location within Grand Est
- Coordinates: 48°12′29″N 5°50′07″E
- Country: France
- Region: Grand Est
- Department: Vosges
- Arrondissement: Neufchâteau
- Canton: Vittel
- Intercommunality: CC Terre d'eau

Government
  - Mayor (2020–2026): Christian Franqueville
- Area^{1}: 13.33 km^{2} (5.15 sq mi)
- Elevation: 347 m (1,138 ft)
- Highest elevation: 439 m (1,440 ft)
- Lowest elevation: 328 m (1,076 ft)
- Population (2023): 1,516
  - Density: 113.7/km^{2} (294.6/sq mi)
- Time zone: UTC+01:00 (CET)
  - Summer (DST): UTC+02:00 (CEST)
- INSEE/Postal code: 88079 /88140
- Website: www.mairie-bulgneville.fr
- ^{1} French Land Register data, which excludes lakes, ponds, glaciers > 1 km^{2} (0.386 sq mi or 247 acres) and river estuaries.

Bulgnéville (French pronunciation: [by(l)ɲevil]) is a commune in the Vosges department in Grand Est in northeastern France.

== History ==
The Battle of Bulgnéville took place there on 2 July 1431.

A major employer is the cheese factory of the Hermitage, which makes Le Brouère.

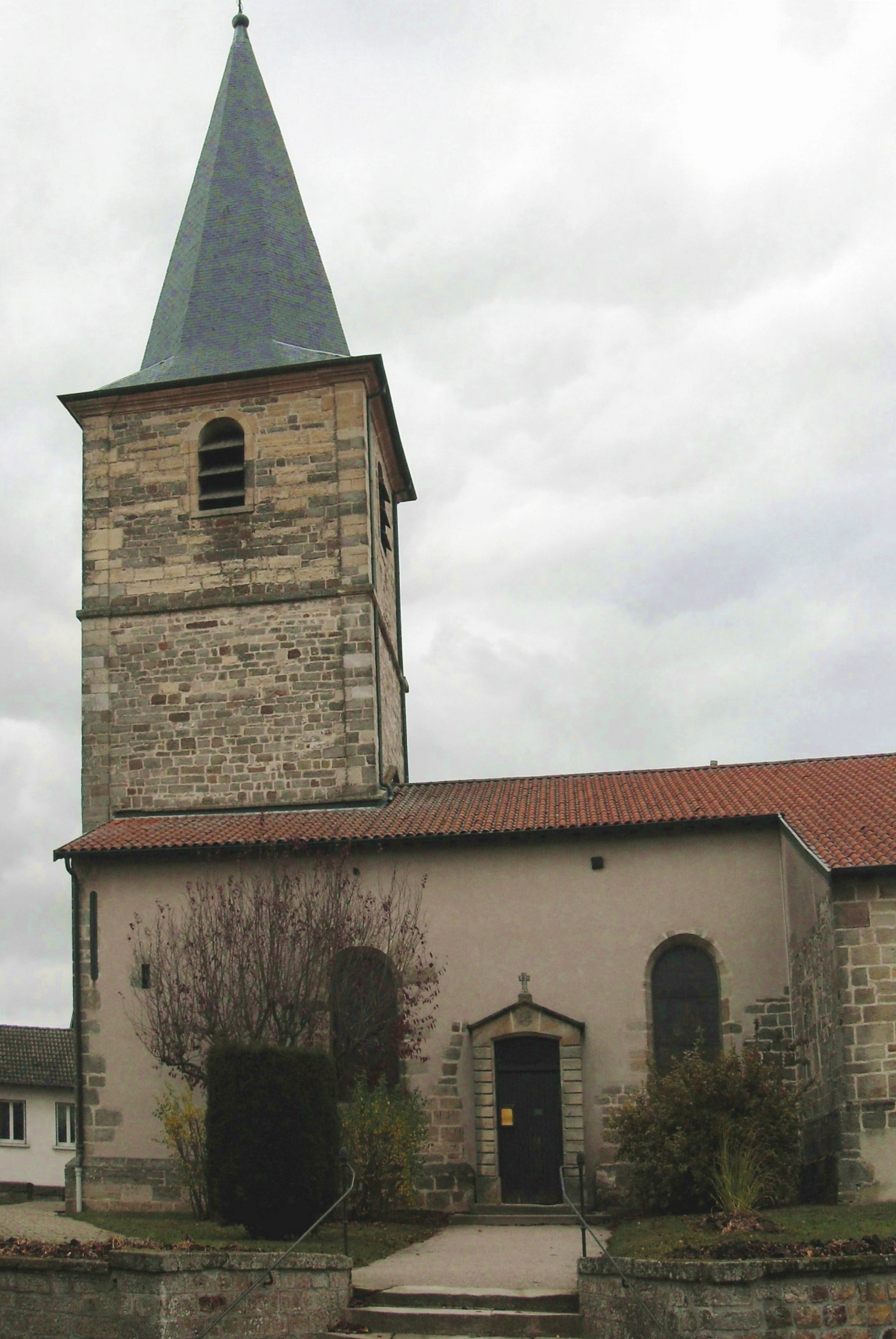
Saint-Pierre-et-Saint-Paul Church

== See also ==
- Communes of the Vosges department
