= Jenson Salvart =

French architect (1398–1447)

Jenson Salvart (1398–1447) was a 15th-century French master builder.

== Biography ==
Probably not from Normandy, he is famous for his work. He did his apprenticeship under Jean de Bayeux, master builder of the Rouen Cathedral. In March 1398, Jenson Salvart succeeded him. He continued the work on the western façade with the realization of a series of arcatures filled with statues. It also replaced the cathedral's high windows to provide more light. He also created the canons' bookstore, completely taken over later by Guillaume Pontifs.

In 1410, he became responsible for the work at Château de Tancarville. After the capture of Harfleur by the English, he was charged in 1417 with creating a defence for the port of Honfleur. In 1419, Henry V of England, entrusted him with the construction of a new royal Castle at Rouen. At an unknown date, he became project manager of the city of Rouen.

In 1427, involved in the conspiracy of Ricart Mittes with Alexandre de Berneval, he was sent to prison. Sentenced to death and pardoned just before his execution, he lost all his possessions, including his house, in the parish of Saint-Lô.
