= Château de Mauléon =

French castle

- Vieux château de Mauléon
- Mauléon-Licharre, Pyrénées-Atlantiques in France
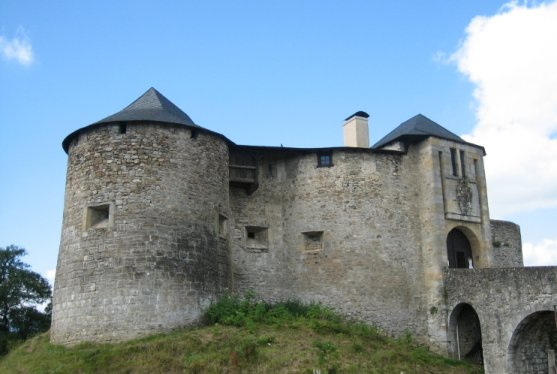
- General view

Site information
- Type: Castle
- Owner: Commune

Location
- Coordinates: 43°13′09″N 0°53′11″W

Site history
- Built: 11th century

The Château de Mauléon, known as vieux château ("old castle"), is a castle in the commune of Mauléon-Licharre, in the Pyrénées-Atlantiques département of France. It was registered as a monument historique on 4 May 1925.

== History ==
The old castle of Mauléon originated in the 11th century, when the viscounty of Soule was formed, as a motte-and-bailey castle erected on a hill, composed of a wooden tower, flanked by a farmyard, all protected by a palisade surrounded by a moat. In 1261, the English king, who held the title of Viscount, decided to assert his authority, especially militarily, through a châtelain, paid by him. Between 1272 and 1287, Edward I, concerned with his strongholds' quality, imposed repairs and strengthening of the castle fortifications. This work was continued in 1319 and 1374 by later châtelains.

After vain attempts to capture the castle from England, and sometimes temporarily successful attempts (as between 1295 and 1307), Gaston IV, Count of Foix, favouring the King of France, initiated in 1449 the reconquest of Guyenne by taking Mauléon. When he died on the battlefield in 1472, the castle and the whole of Soule became permanently attached to France. It suffered new, but short-lived, attacks in 1523 by the Prince of Orange and the Lord of Luxe. In the second half of the 16th century, the castle suffered during the French Wars of Religion, and it was burned on this occasion.

In 1642, by order of Louis XIII, the castle was demolished. In 1648, a partial reconstruction was organized, but the castle was finally abandoned. Under the French Revolution, it was used as a prison, a function it kept for years.

In 1831, the Minister of War refused its restoration, although it housed a garrison until 1870 when the town becomes the owner.

The old castle of Mauléon is a registered historic monument by decree of 4 May 1925.

== Description ==
Source
The castle is built on top of a hill dominating the town in front of the Matalon hill (439 m). It has the shape of a pentagon oriented north-east south-west. In front of the castle, two flat spaces are located at each end and probably had homes in the Middle Ages. The southwestern one is now overgrown. The castle is accessed on the north-east side by an outcrop, a stone bridge with three arches, and formerly a small drawbridge. Most of the buildings are on this north-east side. They consist of small rooms that housed a small garrison.

The walls are enhanced by the construction of the castle on a hill. They are not crenellated. They are reinforced by three corner towers. They are pierced with loopholes for the artillery, especially on the town side.

In the castle courtyard are:

- The very narrow entrance to the dungeons at the foot of the buildings
- A 29 metres (95 ft) deep well to reach the water table
- To the southwest, the almost-levelled ruins of the medieval keep, destroyed in the 18th century.

The drawbridge has been removed (including the lifting chains) and replaced by planks.

== Cinema ==
Le Monde vivant, directed by Eugène Green, was shot at the Château de Mauléon.

== See also ==
- List of castles in France
