= Félizé Regnard =

French courtier

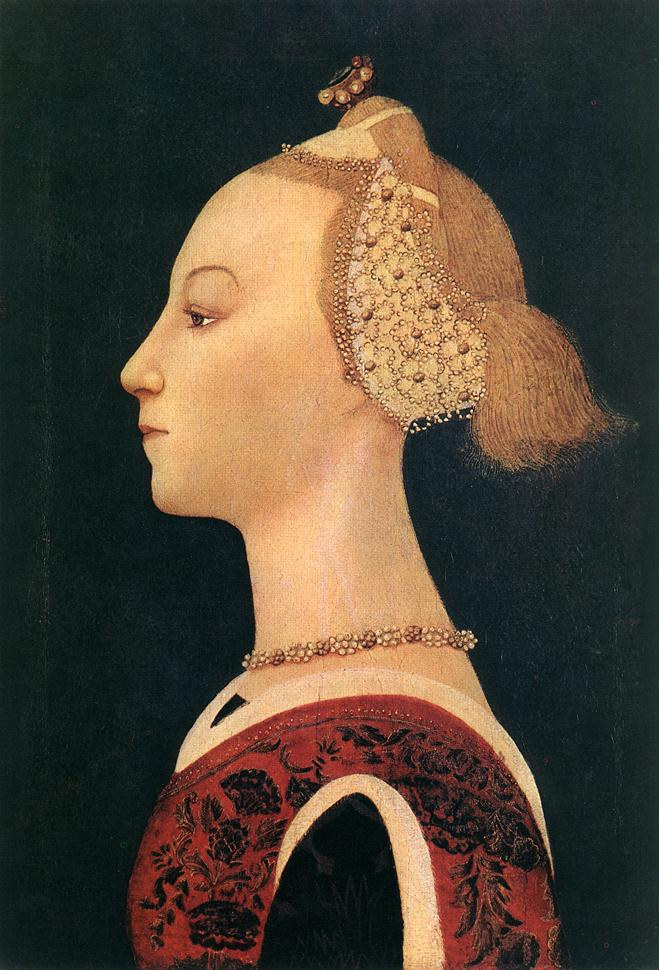
Félizé Regnard

Félize Regnard (1424–1474) was a French courtier. She was a lady-in-waiting to the queen of France, Charlotte of Savoy, and mistress to king Louis XI.

She was the daughter of Aymar Reynard, seigneur de Saint Didier, and married to Jean Pic (d. 1452). She became a lady-in-waiting as a widow and had the daughter Guyette de Valois with Louis XI. She remarried Charles de Seillons.

== Sources ==
- Kendall, Paul Murray (1971). Louis XI: The Universal Spider. Compton Printing Ltd.
