= Vaudoncourt, Vosges =

Vaudoncourt
- Commune
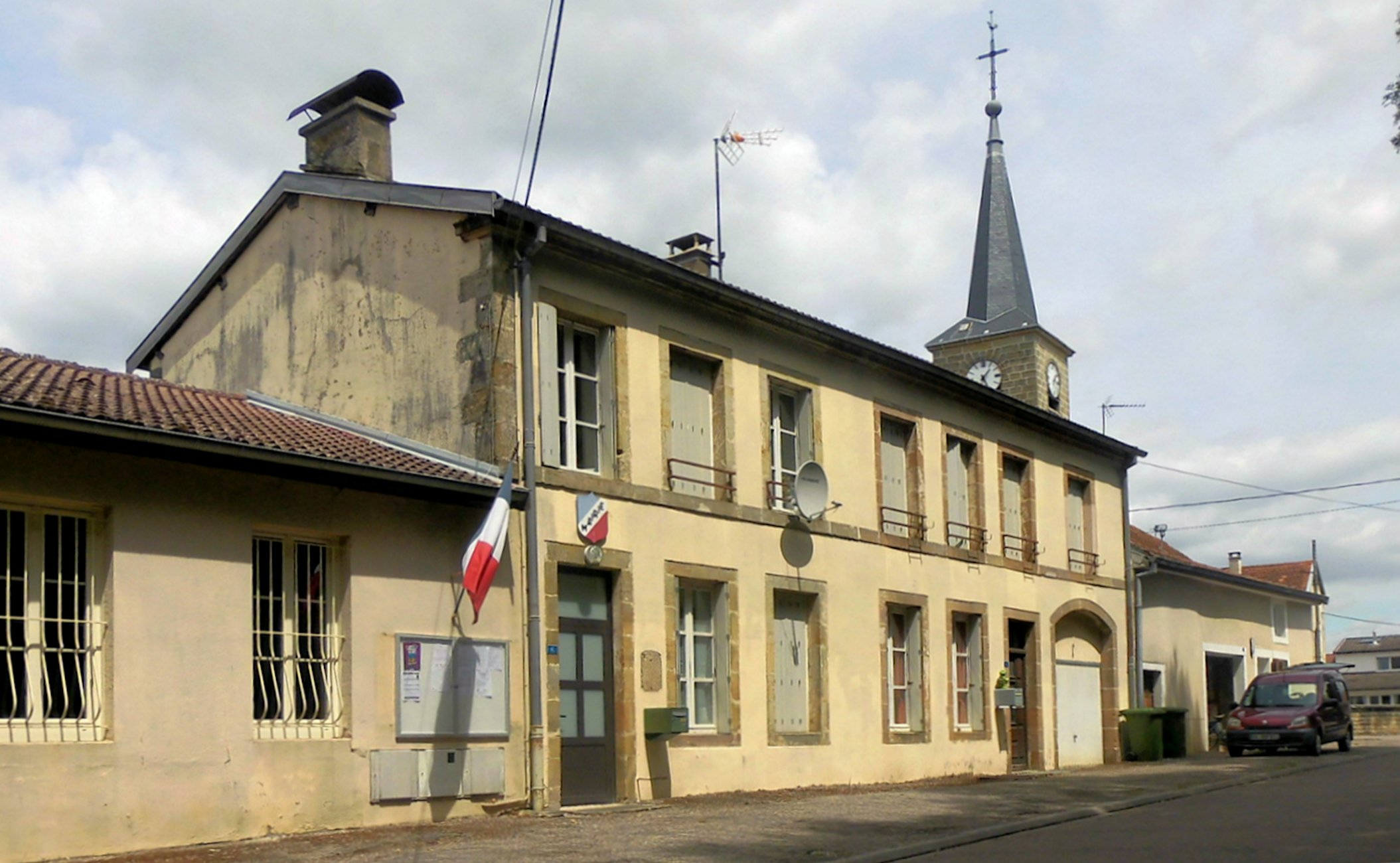
- The town hall in Vaudoncourt
- Location of Vaudoncourt
- Location within France Location within Grand Est
- Coordinates: 48°13′11″N 5°48′24″E
- Country: France
- Region: Grand Est
- Department: Vosges
- Arrondissement: Neufchâteau
- Canton: Vittel
- Intercommunality: CC Terre d'eau

Government
  - Mayor (2020–2026): Jérôme Nicolas
- Area^{1}: 5.67 km^{2} (2.19 sq mi)
- Elevation: 330 m (1,080 ft)
- Highest elevation: 368 m (1,207 ft)
- Lowest elevation: 320 m (1,050 ft)
- Population (2023): 146
  - Density: 25.7/km^{2} (66.7/sq mi)
- Time zone: UTC+01:00 (CET)
  - Summer (DST): UTC+02:00 (CEST)
- INSEE/Postal code: 88496 /88140
- ^{1} French Land Register data, which excludes lakes, ponds, glaciers > 1 km^{2} (0.386 sq mi or 247 acres) and river estuaries.

Vaudoncourt (French pronunciation: [vodɔ̃kuʁ]) is a commune in the Vosges department in Grand Est in northeastern France.

== See also ==
- Communes of the Vosges department
