= Treaty of Tours =

1441 attempted peace treaty during the Hundred Years' War

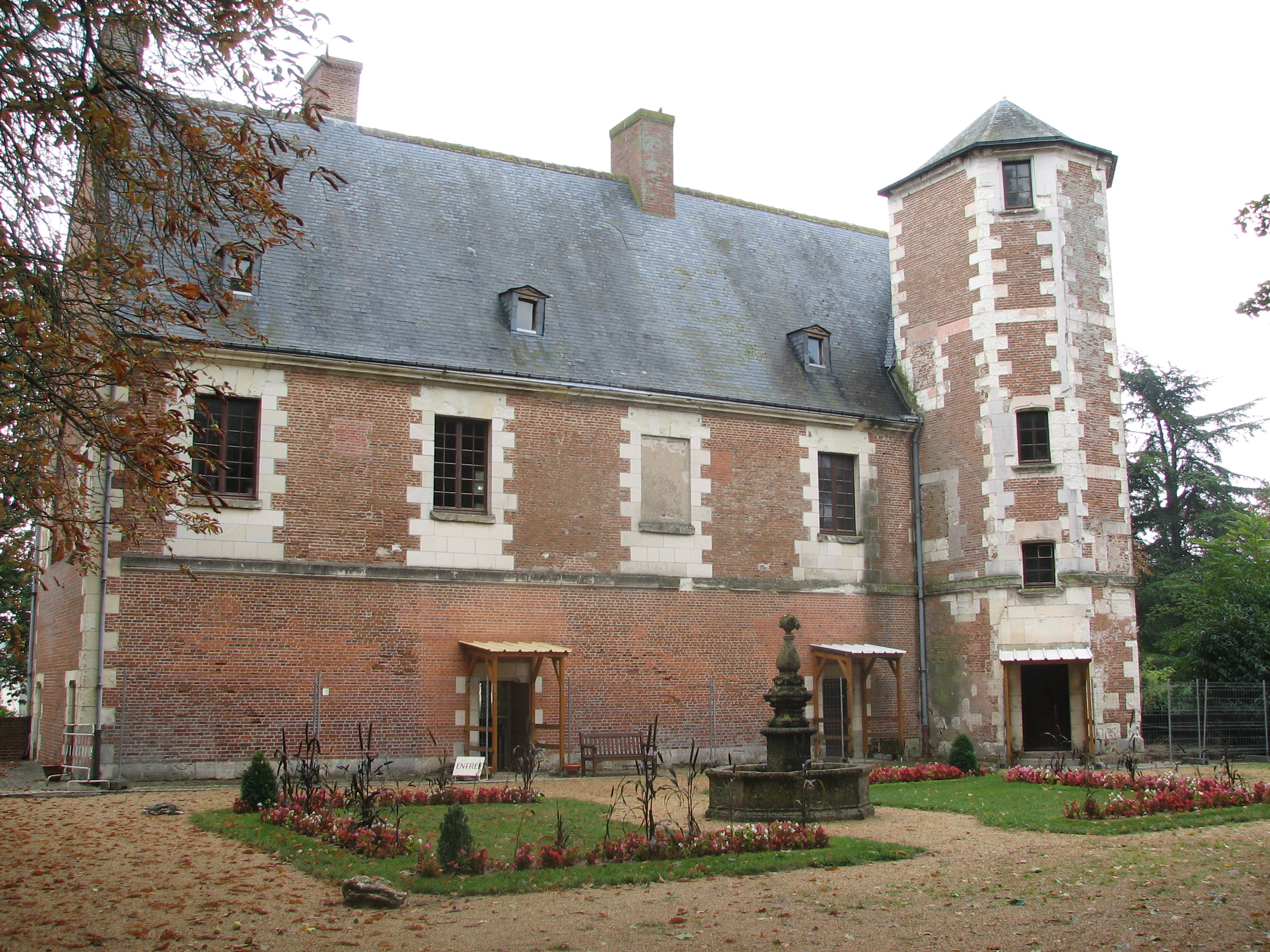
- The Château de Plessis-lez-Tours, where the treaty was signed
- Type: Truce and marriage agreement
- Context: Hundred Years' War
- Signed: 28 May 1444; Château de Plessis-lez-Tours
- Expiry: 31 July 1449
- Parties: Kingdom of England Kingdom of France
- Negotiators: For England: William de la Pole For France: Jean de Dunois; Louis de Beaumont

The Treaty of Tours was an attempted peace agreement between Henry VI of England and Charles VII of France, concluded by their envoys on 28 May 1444 in the closing years of the Hundred Years' War. The terms stipulated the marriage of Charles VII's niece, Margaret of Anjou, to Henry VI, and the creation of a truce of two years – later extended – between the kingdoms of England and France. In exchange for the marriage, Charles wanted the English-held area of Maine in northern France, just south of Normandy.

Henry VI married the fifteen-year-old Margaret on 23 April 1445; he did not, however, give up Maine immediately. This clause was initially kept secret, as the cession of this strategically important province was likely to cause a public backlash in England. Charles threatened Henry VI and sent envoys to pressure him; even Margaret tried to persuade Henry to give it up. Henry eventually yielded in 1448 when Charles VII threatened English garrisons with a large army.

The treaty was seen as a major failure for England as the bride secured for Henry VI was a poor match, being Charles VII's niece only through marriage, and was otherwise related to him by blood only distantly. Her marriage also came without a dowry, as Margaret was the daughter of the impoverished Duke René of Anjou, and Henry was also expected to pay for the wedding. Henry believed the treaty was a first step towards a lasting peace, while Charles intended to use it purely for military advantage. The truce collapsed in 1449 and England quickly lost what remained of its French lands, bringing the Hundred Years' War to an end.

The failure of the treaty of Tours and the renewal of hostilities brought down the English government of the day. Its consequences exacerbated rifts between the court's Beaufort faction and the dukes of Gloucester and York, and has been considered a potentially contributory factor to the outbreak of the Wars of the Roses.

== Context ==
In 1444, the Hundred Years' War (1337–1453) had now raged for more than a century between the houses of Valois and Plantagenet, who fought for control of the throne of France. The French under King Charles VII had gained ground dramatically after the intervention of Joan of Arc in 1429 and the dissolution of the alliance between England and the Duchy of Burgundy, a French vassal, in 1435. The English king, Henry VI, who came of age in 1437, was an incompetent ruler and war leader. The French held the initiative, and, by 1444, English rule in France was limited to Normandy in the north and a strip of land in Gascony in the southwest, while Charles VII ruled over Paris and the rest of France with the support of most of the French regional nobility.

The English territories in France could not withstand more taxation, whereas the English state was nearing bankruptcy. The English political establishment believed that an agreement would have to be reached with the French and that concessions would have to be made, with the exception of the king's uncle, Humphrey, Duke of Gloucester – then the heir to the throne – who advocated for continued military presence in France to preserve England's possessions there. A truce would provide the English a much needed break from hostilities. For the French, it would give them time to strengthen their armies in preparation for a possible resumption of the war, and prevent any hypothetical renewal of the Anglo-Burgundian alliance.

== Treaty ==
It is unclear which side had the initiative to propose discussions, but by January 1444 the English council decided to open talks with the French. In 1444, Henry VI, Charles VII, and Duke Philip of Burgundy reached an agreement that their commissioners should meet at Tours to discuss peace terms and a possible marriage alliance between England and France. The English embassy was headed by William de la Pole, Earl of Suffolk, who on 1 February 1444 was dispatched to France. The French delegation was led by Jean de Dunois. In March, Suffolk landed in France and in April, he met with the French embassy.

The English offered to drop Henry VI's claim to French throne in exchange for Normandy without French suzerainty, but this was rejected. The English in turn rejected French demands that landowners who fled the English occupation be restored to their possessions. Negotiations bogged down, the French refusing any significant concessions. Suffolk formally requested the hand of Margaret of Anjou, daughter of René of Anjou (brother in law to Charles VII) as a wife for Henry. Rene agreed, but insisted that he had no money and could not provide the customary dowry, when the amount that should have been given was 20,000 livres. He demanded that in exchange for the marriage and a proposed 21-month truce in the War, England return to France the lands of Maine and Anjou. Suffolk knew that this would not be popular in England, but Henry insisted on the truce, having heard that the Count of Nevers was preparing to offer marriage to Margaret himself. The marriage was not considered advantageous to England since Margaret was not a close relation to Charles VII, and was related only through the marriage of her father to the King's sister.

The English had optimistically thought that a marriage alliance would turn René of Anjou into a major advocate for peace at his brother-in-law's court. For Charles VII however, a marriage between his niece and the English King would prevent the English from concluding a marriage alliance with one of his more rebellious nobles, the Count of Armagnac having already made proposals previously. An alliance with the impoverished house of Anjou was less beneficial to the English than one with the house of Armagnac. Another factor cited as a diplomatic blunder was Suffolk's failure to include Brittany and Aragon in the list of Henry VI's allies on the truce, and allowing Charles VII to place Brittany in his own. All of the concessions in the treaty were made by England and France got the better end of the truce. Henry believed it was a first step towards a lasting peace; Charles intended to use it purely for military advantage.

Additionally, the blame of the unfavorable request to return Maine and Anjou to the French was laid at Suffolk's feet, though he insisted that he had made no promises at the Treaty to that demand. Suffolk brought the new queen back to England later that year to meet the king. When she landed in England, the King dressed himself as a squire and brought a letter supposed to be from the King so that he could watch Margaret in secret. When Suffolk asked later what she thought of the squire, the queen stated that she did not notice him at all. Suffolk told her that she had just been with the King, and she was upset, realizing she'd kept him on his knees the entire time he read the letter.

The Treaty of Tours was to expire in April 1446, and England sought to extend it in order to find a longer-lasting peace with France. This was perhaps undermined by the fact that Henry VI refused to cede the lands of Maine and Anjou until 1448, and only then on threat of military force from Charles VII.

== Aftermath in England ==
In England, the cession of Maine was expected to garner opposition principally by two powerful men: the Earl of Somerset, who was the greatest landowner in, and the governor of, Maine, and the Duke of Gloucester, who opposed territorial concessions to the French and whose opposition to the peace process was well known. Although Gloucester congratulated the Duke of Suffolk in parliament in June 1445 for his role in the peace process, he soon after helped flare up tensions by sending (12 July) a gift to the King of Aragon – the archenemy of Henry VI's new father-in-law René of Anjou. Just a few days later (15 July), probably as a response for this, Suffolk and Henry VI humiliated Gloucester in front of French ambassadors, the latter signaling his disdain for his uncle's political inclinations and the former telling them (in the king's presence) later on that Gloucester counted for nothing on government policy. The possibility that Gloucester could serve as a figurehead for embittered war veterans and other opponents of the regime led Suffolk to instigate his arrest on charges of treason in early 1447. The imprisoned duke died shortly afterwards, probably of a stroke, though there were rumors that he had been murdered.

The Earl of Somerset was brought on board of the cessation of Maine by being offered the governorship of Normandy. However, it was already expected that the office would be held by the Duke of York. For the Duke of Suffolk, the easiest way to get York out of the way was to discredit him politically. In late 1446, a violent altercation in parliament between Suffolk's ally bishop Adam Moleyns and the Duke of York over allegations of the latter's misconduct as lieutenant-general discredited York politically and provided the justification for York's dismissal. York was mollified by being appointed governor of Ireland. He was nonetheless enraged at his treatment, which alienated Suffolk's regime from a hitherto supporter.

The truce of Tours collapsed in 1449 and the French then proceeded to conquer Normandy with ease. The Duke of Suffolk, politically discredited over the failure of his signature achievement, was impeached and murdered in 1450. His demise paved the way for Somerset to replace him as the court favourite. In the following years York, slighted over his previous treatment and seeing the collapse of English France under Somerset's tenure as damaging to his honor, would tirelessly lobby for Somerset's removal from power, accusing him of incompetence and embezzlement. Their feud was a crucial factor in the escalation of tensions that led to the Wars of the Roses.
