= List of bluegrass bands =

This is an alphabetical list of bluegrass bands. A bluegrass band is a group of musicians who play acoustic stringed instruments, typically some combination of guitar, mandolin, fiddle, banjo, dobro and upright bass, to perform bluegrass music.

Each band on this list either has published sources — such as a news reports, magazine articles, or books — verifying it is a performing or recording bluegrass band and meeting Wikipedia's notability criteria for bands, or a Wikipedia article confirming its notability.

For individual musicians, see the List of bluegrass musicians.

See also: Bluegrass music, Country music, and List of country music performers.

== A ==
- The Accidentals
- Acoustic Syndicate
- Authentic Unlimited

== B ==
- Balsam Range
- Barry Scott & Second Wind
- Bearfoot
- The Beef Seeds
- Bill Monroe & His Bluegrass Boys
- Biscuit Burners
- Blackberry Smoke
- BlueBilly Grit
- Blue Highway
- Bluegrass Album Band
- Bluegrass Brothers
- Bob Paisley and the Southern Grass
- Kathy Boyd and Phoenix Rising

== C ==
- Chesapeake
- Charles River Valley Boys
- The Charlie Daniels Band
- The Coal Porters
- The Country Gentlemen
- The Cox Family
- Cherryholmes
- Chatham County Line
- Clinch Mountain Boys
- Crooked Still
- Crow and the Canyon

== D ==
- Dailey & Vincent
- Danny Paisley and the Southern Grass
- The Dead South
- Del McCoury Band
- Della Mae
- The Dillards
- Dixie Flyers
- Dixie Gentlemen
- Donna Ulisse
- Doyle Lawson & Quicksilver
- Druhá Tráva
- Dry Branch Fire Squad

== E ==
- East Coast Bluegrass Band

== F ==
- Foggy Mountain Boys (aka "Flatt and Scruggs")
- Front Porch String Band

== G ==
- Gary Ruley and Mule Train
- The Gibson Brothers
- Good Old Guard Gospel Singers
- The Grascals
- The Greenbriar Boys
- The Greencards
- Greensky Bluegrass
- Grass It Up

== H ==
- Hackensaw Boys
- Hayde Bluegrass Orchestra
- Hayseed Dixie
- The Hillbilly Thomists
- The Hillmen
- Hot Rize
- Headin’ Home

== I ==
- IIIrd Tyme Out
- Ila Auto
- The Infamous Stringdusters
- Iron Horse (band)

== J ==
- Jim and Jesse McReynolds and the Virginia Boys
- Jim & Jennie and the Pinetops
- Johnson Mountain Boys

== K ==
- Kentucky Colonels
- Alison Krauss and Union Station

== L ==
- Lonesome Pine Fiddlers
- Lonesome River Band
- Lonesome Sisters

== M ==
- Mission Mountain Wood Band
- Mountain Heart
- Muleskinner

== N ==
- Nashville Bluegrass Band
- Nashville Grass
- Nefesh Mountain
- New Grass Revival
- New South
- Nickel Creek
- Northern Lights
- Nothin' Fancy

== O ==
- Oakhurst
- Old & In the Way
- Osborne Brothers
- Old Crow Medicine Show

== P ==
- Packway Handle Band
- The Petersens
- Pine Mountain Railroad
- Psychograss
- Punch Brothers

== R ==
- The Rarely Herd
- Rautakoura
- Rhonda Vincent and the Rage
- Russell Moore and IIIrd Tyme Out
- Railroad Earth

== S ==
- Saddle River String Band
- Salamander Crossing
- The Seldom Scene
- Sister Sadie
- Sleepy Man Banjo Boys
- The Special Consensus
- The Stanley Brothers
- The SteelDrivers
- The Steel Wheels
- Steep Canyon Rangers
- The Stonemans
- Billy Strings
- Sweet Lillies

== T ==
- Tangleweed
- Trampled by Turtles
- The Travelin' McCourys

== U ==
- Uncle Monk

== W ==
- Walker's Run
- Water Tower
- Watkins Family Hour
- The Waybacks
- The Whiskey Boys
- Robin and Linda Williams
- Wimberley Bluegrass Band
- The Woodbox Gang

== Y ==
- Yonder Mountain String Band
