= List of bluegrass musicians =

This is an alphabetical list of bluegrass musicians. For bands, see the List of bluegrass bands.

== A ==
- Tom Adams
- Eddie Adcock
- David "Stringbean" Akeman
- Red Allen
- Darol Anger
- Mike Auldridge

== B ==
- Kenny Baker
- Jessie Baker
- Butch Baldassari
- Russ Barenberg
- Byron Berline
- Carroll Best
- Norman Blake
- Kathy Boyd
- Dale Ann Bradley
- David Bromberg
- Herman Brock Jr
- Jesse Brock
- Alison Brown
- Buckethead
- Buzz Busby
- Roger Bush
- Sam Bush

== C ==
- Ann Marie Calhoun
- Jason Carter
- Vassar Clements
- Michael Cleveland
- Bill Clifton
- Charlie Cline
- Curly Ray Cline
- Mike Compton
- John Byrne Cooke
- J. P. Cormier
- John Cowan
- Dan Crary
- J. D. Crowe

== D ==
- Jamie Dailey
- Charlie Daniels
- Vernon Derrick
- Hazel Dickens
- Doug Dillard
- The Dillards
- Jerry Douglas
- Casey Driessen
- John Duffey
- Stuart Duncan

== E ==
- Chris Eldridge
- Bill Emerson
- Bill Evans

== F ==
- Raymond Fairchild
- Dennis Fetchet
- Pete Fidler
- Lester Flatt
- Béla Fleck
- Sally Ann Forrester
- Randall Franks
- Tony Furtado

== G ==
- Jerry Garcia
- Eric Gibson
- Leigh Gibson
- Vince Gill
- Brennan Gilmore
- Johnny Gimble
- Rhiannon Giddens
- Josh Graves
- Richard Greene
- Clinton Gregory
- David Grier
- Lamar Grier
- Andy Griffith
- David Grisman

== H ==
- Jamie Hartford
- John Hartford
- Aubrey Haynie
- John Herald
- Bobby Hicks
- Winky Hicks
- Chris Hillman
- Scott Holstein
- Sierra Hull

== I ==
- Rob Ickes
- IIIrd Tyme Out

== J ==
- Jana Jae
- Sarah Jarosz
- Mitchell F. Jayne (Mitch Jayne)

== K ==
- Michael Kang
- Kaia Kater
- Larry Keel
- Leslie Keith
- Irene Kelley
- Danny Knicely
- Kenny Kosek
- Alison Krauss
- Gundula Krause
- Robert Křesťan

== L ==
- Shawn Lane
- Jim Lauderdale
- Bernie Leadon
- Doyle Lawson
- Kate Lee
- Ray Legere
- Laurie Lewis
- Benjamin F. Logan
- Patty Loveless
- Andy Leftwich
- Claire Lynch

== M ==
- Mack Magaha
- Benny Martin
- Jimmy Martin
- Mac Martin
- Steve Martin
- Bessie Lee Mauldin
- Del McCoury
- Jesse McReynolds
- Jim McReynolds
- Edgar Meyer
- Charlie Monroe
- Bill Monroe
- Alan Munde

== N ==
- Penny Nichols
- Alecia Nugent

== O ==
- Tim O'Brien
- Mark O'Connor

== P ==
- Dolly Parton
- Todd Phillips
- Danny Paisley

== R ==
- Missy Raines
- Tommy Ramone
- David Rawlings
- Don Reno
- Tony Rice
- Alwyn Robinson
- Peter Rowan
- Gary Ruley

== S ==
- Josh Shilling
- Earl Scruggs
- Ricky Skaggs
- Arthur Lee "Red" Smiley
- Arthur "Guitar Boogie" Smith
- Ruby Jane Smith
- Johnny Staats
- Carter Stanley
- Ralph Stanley
- Chris Stapleton
- Andy Statman
- Larry Stephenson
- Billy Strings
- Marty Stuart
- Eddie Stubbs
- Bryan Sutton

== T ==
- Gordon Terry
- Chris Thile
- Tony Trischka
- Josh Turner
- Molly Tuttle
- Dan Tyminski

== U ==
- Donna Ulisse

== V ==
- Jim Van Cleve
- Dailey & Vincent
- Rhonda Vincent

== W ==
- Charlie Waller
- Sara Watkins
- Doc Watson
- Eric Weissberg
- Dean Webb
- Gillian Welch
- Clarence White
- Roland White
- Keith Whitley
- Benny Williams
- "Big" Paul Williams
- Vern Williams
- Chubby Wise
- Mac Wiseman
- Gene Wooten

== Y ==
- Rex Yetman

== See also ==
- Bluegrass music
- Country music
- List of country music performers
