= Patrick McAvinue =

American fiddler (born 1988)

- Born: April 4, 1988 (age 38); Hereford, Maryland, U.S.
- Genres: Bluegrass music, Celtic music
- Occupations: Musician, educator
- Instrument: Fiddle
- Label: Patuxent Music
- Website: patrickmcavinue.com

Patrick Coleman McAvinue is an American fiddler, combining in his music aspects of bluegrass, swing, and Celtic music. He is also a private music educator. He is the IBMA's 2017 Fiddle Player of the Year.

== Biography ==
=== Early years ===
McAvinue is a native of Hereford, Maryland. He began playing fiddle at age 7 and was trained as a classical violinist. At age 10, Peabody graduate Amy Hopkins taught him fiddle tunes from all over the world. Then he received training from multi-instrumentalist Troy Engle. At age 12, McAvinue formed The Salem Bottom Boys, his first band.

In 2003, 2004, and 2005, McAvinue won the Delaware State Fiddle Championship. In 2004, he joined the band Smooth Kentucky after hearing the band on a local radio show. The band also included Ed Hough (guitar, vocals), B.J. Lazarus (mandolin), Cris Jacobs (guitar, vocals), Dave Frieman (bass), Jordan Tice (guitar, vocals) and Dave Giegerich (resonator guitar).

In 2011, McAvinue received a Bachelor of Music degree in Jazz Performance from Towson University, where he studied under pianist Tim Murphy, trumpeter David Ballou, and violinist Dr. Jeffrey Howard.

=== Audie Blaylock and Redline ===
In 2006, at age 16, McAvinue joined Audie Blaylock and Redline. He has recorded seven albums with them, including 2016's The Road That Winds.

=== Solo recordings ===
On McAvinue's 2006 solo album Grave Run, he was assisted by Dudley Connell, Sammy Shelor, Chris Warner, Troy Engle, David McLaughlin, Marshall Wilborn, and Mike Auldridge.

Rutland's Reel in 2008 featured Audie Blaylock, Jesse Brock, Michael Cleveland, Barry Reid, Pete Kelly, and Chris Warner.

=== Charm City Junction ===
In 2014, McAvinue formed the band Charm City Junction with Brad Kolodner (banjo), Sean McComiskey (accordion) and Alex Lacquement (bass). Charm City is a nickname for Baltimore. Charm City Junction plays a mix of Celtic music. The band began when McAvinue, Kolodner, and McComiskey met at an old-time music jam. They synced well, and added Lacquement to the new band.

=== Dailey & Vincent ===
In 2016, McAvinue moved to Nashville, Tennessee to be part of the Dailey & Vincent touring band, replacing B. J. Cherryholmes on fiddle.

=== Artist in Residence ===
In 2016, McAvinue accepted the position of Artist in Residence at the Strathmore Arts Center in Bethesda, Maryland.

=== Awards ===
McAvinue received the International Bluegrass Music Association’s 2015 Momentum Instrumentalist of the Year award.

In 2017, McAvinue won the IBMA award for Fiddle Player of the Year.

== Discography ==
=== Solo albums ===
- 2006: Grave Run (Patuxent Music)
- 2008: Rutland's Reel (Patuxent Music)
- 2019: Perfect Fit (McAvinue Music)

=== With Smooth Kentucky ===
- 2009: A Few More Miles (CD Baby)

=== With Audie Blaylock and Redline ===
- 2009: Audie Blaylock and Redline (Rural Rhythm)
- 2010: Cryin Heart Blues (Rural Rhythm)
- 2010: Live at Graves Mountain (Rural Rhythm)
- 2011: I'm Going Back to Old Kentucky: A Bill Monroe Celebration (Rural Rhythm)
- 2011: Live at Bean Blossom (Rural Rhythm)
- 2012: Hard Country (Rural Rhythm)
- 2016: The Road That Winds (Patuxent Music)

=== With Charm City Junction ===
- 2015: Charm City Junction (Patuxent Music)
- 2018: Duckpin (Tater Patch Records)
- 2019: Snowball (Tater Patch Records)

=== Also appears on ===
- 2007: The Bridge - The Bridge (Hyena)
- 2008: The Bridge - Blind Man's Hill (Hyena)
- 2009: Arty Hill and the Long Gone Daddies - Montgomery on My Mind (Cow Island Music)
- 2009: Jessie Baker - Yessir! (Patuxent Music)
- 2014: Alexander Peters - Youth Belongs to the Young (Independent / Red Bridge Studios)
- 2015: Brent & Co. - Brent & Co. (self-released)
- 2015: John McCutcheon - Joe Hill's Last Will (Appalsongs)
- 2016: Robert Mabe - Somewhere in the Middle (Frogtown Music)
- 2017: Zane Campbell - Ola Wave (Emperor)
- 2017: Mary Battiata and Little Pink - The Heart, Regardless (CD Baby)
- 2017: Jesse Burdick - Hops & Spirits (Patuxent Music)
- 2019: Julie Keough - Every Other Color (Cd Baby)
- 2021: Brad Kolodner - Chimney Swifts (Fenchurch Music)
