= Audie Blaylock =

American musician (1962–2024)

Background information
- Born: August 18, 1962; El Paso, Texas, U.S.
- Died: January 10, 2024 (aged 61) Auburn, Indiana, U.S.
- Genre: Bluegrass music
- Occupation: Musician
- Instruments: Guitar, vocals, mandolin
- Years active: 1983–2024
- Labels: Rural Rhythm, Patuxent
- Formerly of: Jimmy Martin, Red Allen, Lynn Morris, Rhonda Vincent, Michael Cleveland, Audie Blaylock and Redline
- Website: redlinebluegrass.com

Audie Blaylock (August 18, 1962 – January 10, 2024) was an American singer, guitarist, mandolinist and composer in the bluegrass tradition.

== Biography ==
=== Early years ===
Blaylock was born in El Paso, Texas, but was raised in Lansing, Michigan. Growing up in a family where both parents played music, he learned guitar at age 8. He grew up playing guitar and mandolin in local bands.

=== Support for Other Artists ===
In 1982, at age 19, Blaylock joined Jimmy Martin and the Sunny Mountain Boys, and spent nine years with them playing mandolin.

In 1990, Blaylock worked with Red Allen until his death in 1993.

Starting in 1993, Blaylock played both mandolin and guitar with the Lynn Morris Band.

From 1997 to 2000, Blaylock played with Harley Allen (Red Allen's son). Allen was an accomplished country music songwriter (for Garth Brooks, John Michael Montgomery, and others), and recorded for Mercury Records.

From 1999 to 2003, Blaylock worked with Rhonda Vincent and the Rage, playing guitar and singing harmonies.

From 2006 to 2007, Blaylock and fiddler Michael Cleveland formed "Michael Cleveland and Flamekeeper featuring Audie Blaylock."

=== Trains Are the Only Way to Fly ===
In 2001, Bllaylock recorded his self-released solo album Trains Are the Only Way to Fly, featuring Tom Adams (banjo), Jesse Brock (mandolin), and Ron Stewart (fiddle).

=== Audie Blaylock and Redline ===
Blaylock started Redline in 2004, took time out to work with Michael Cleveland, and reactivated Redline in 2007. The current band consists of Evan Ward on banjo, Reed Jones on the bass, and Mason Wright on fiddle. Patrick McAvinue played fiddle in the band prior to joining Dailey and Vincent. Russ Carson played banjo in the band prior to joining Ricky Skaggs and Kentucky Thunder. Matt Wallace played bass at first, but was later replaced by Reed Jones.

Blaylock and Redline released the Audie Blaylock & Redline album in 2009 on the Rural Rhythm label. In 2010, they released Cryin' Heart Blues which was compared favourably to the music of Jimmy Martin.

In 2011, Blaylock released the I'm Going Back to Old Kentucky: A Bill Monroe Celebration album (Rural Rhythm). Special guests included Ronnie McCoury, Glen Duncan, Jason Carter, Bobby Osborne, Lou Reid, Del McCoury, and Carl Jackson.

Blaylock released the album Hard Country in 2012, produced by Scott Vestal. Blaylock chose the album name to emphasize how closely bluegrass and country music are related.

In 2016, Blaylock and Redline released The Road That Winds album for Patuxent Music. Banjoist Evan Ward returned to the band, joining Blaylock, McAvinue, and Jones. The album was recorded at Scott Vestal's Digital Underground Studio.

=== Other projects ===
In 2004, Blaylock was a primary coordinator for and contributor to the A Tribute to Jimmy Martin: The King of Bluegrass project, which also featured Kenny Ingram, J. D. Crowe, Paul Williams, Michael Cleveland, Jason Moore, and Sonya Isaacs.

Luthier Teddy Workman of TW Guitars in West Virginia designed and constructed the Red Line edition guitar in 2010, with rosewood back and sides and a thin red line running up the fret board into the peghead.

== Death ==
Blaylock died on January 10, 2024. He was 61.

== Discography ==
=== Solo albums ===
- 2001: Trains Are the Only Way to Fly (self-released)

=== With Rhonda Vincent ===
- 2001: The Storm Still Rages (Rounder)
- 2003: One Step Ahead (Rounder)

=== With Michael Cleveland ===
- 2002: Flame Keeper (Rounder)
- 2006: Let 'er Go, Boys! (Rounder)

=== With Audie Blaylock and Redline ===
- 2009: Audie Blaylock and Redline (Rural Rhythm)
- 2010: Cryin Heart Blues (Rural Rhythm)
- 2011: I'm Going Back to Old Kentucky: A Bill Monroe Celebration (Rural Rhythm)
- 2012: Hard Country (Rural Rhythm)
- 2016: The Road That Winds (Patuxent Music)
- 2019: Originalist (615 Hideaway Records)

=== As primary contributor ===
- 2004: various artists - Tribute To Jimmy Martin: The King Of Bluegrass (Koch Records)
- 2010: various artists - All-Star Jam: Live at Graves Mountain (Rural Rhythm)
- 2011: various artists - Appalachian Gospel Revival (Rural Rhythm) - track 6, "Who'll Sing For Me"
- 2011: various artists - Rural Rhythm Records Salutes Bill Monroe 100th Year Celebration: Live At Bean Blossom CD (Rural Rhythm) - track 6, "Six Feet Under the Ground"

=== Also appears on ===
- 1989: Chris Warner - Chris Warner & Friends (Webco)
- 1991: Bill Emerson - Reunion (Pinecastle)
- 2006: Patrick McAvinue - Grave Run (Patuxent)
- 2009: Jessie Baker - Yessir! (Patuxent)
- 2009: Michael Martin Murphey - Buckaroo Blue Grass II (Rural Rhythm)
- 2009: Frank Wakefield- "Ownself Blues" (Patuxent)
- 2010: Bobby Osborne - Memories: Celebrating Bobby's 60th Anniversary as a Professional Entertainer (Rural Rhythm)
- 2013: Darren Nicholson - Things Left Undone (self-released)
