= Patuxent Music =

- Founded: 1996
- Founder: Tom Mindte
- Genre: Folk, bluegrass, blues, swing, jazz, old-time
- Country of origin: U.S.
- Location: Rockville, Maryland
- Official website: www.pxrec.com

Patuxent Music is an independent record label in Rockville, Maryland.

== History ==
Bluegrass musician Tom Mindte started recording music by other artists in 1984 with a reel to reel recorder in his father's air conditioning shop. In 1990 Tom opened his own studio, and started the Patuxent label in 1996.

=== Notable projects ===
Patuxent Music's first project was recording fiddler Joe Meadows in 1995. When the original record label couldn't release the recording, Patuxent released it as their first album in 1996.

The Patuxent Banjo Project compiled music from 40 past and current banjo players from the Baltimore-Washington corridor. It was produced by musicians Mark Delaney and Randy Barrett. The backing band included David McLaughlin (mandolin), Danny Knicely (guitar), Tad Marks (fiddle), and Mark Schatz (bass). Among the banjo players recorded were Bill Emerson, Eddie Adcock, Tom Adams, and Roni Stoneman.

== Artists ==
Here is a partial list of artists who have released recordings on the Patuxent label:

- Steve Abshire
- Red Allen and Frank Wakefield
- Jessie Baker
- Banana Express
- Mike Baytop
- Rob Benzing
- Audie Blaylock and Redline
- Bluestone
- Scott Brannon
- Buffalo Nickel Band
- Cane Mill Road
- Russ Carson
- Charm City Junction
- John Colianni
- Larry Coryell
- Bryan Deere
- Mark Delaney
- Casey Driscoll
- Eleanor Ellis
- Brennen Ernst
- Tom Ewing
- Harpe Franklin & Usilton
- Rick Franklin
- Victor Furtado
- Daniel Greeson
- Nate Grower
- Tatiana Hargreaves
- Billy Hurt, Jr.
- Al Jones
- Nate Leath
- Leslie & Jacque
- James Leva
- Corrina Rose Logston
- The Maloy Brothers
- Rusty Mason
- The Mayfield Brothers
- Patrick McAvinue
- Patuxent Partners
- Miss Tess
- Monroe Fields
- Akira Otsuka
- Danny Paisley
- Joshua Palmer
- Kevin Prater
- Bill Runkle
- Barbara Scott
- Donnie "Dobro" Scott
- Louie Setzer
- Karl Shiflett and Big Country Show
- Reece Shipley
- C. T. Smith
- Springfield Exit
- Jeremy Stephens
- Jordan Tice
- Andrew Vogts
- Weems Creek Ramblers
- The Wildmans
- Warner Williams
- Zekiah Swamp Cats

== See also ==
- List of record labels
