= Whitesburg =

Whitesburg may refer to a place in the United States:

- Whitesburg, Georgia
- Whitesburg, Kentucky
- Whitesburg, Tennessee
