= The Wayfaring Stranger (song) =

American folk song

Song
- Published: 1858 (earliest known)
- Genre: American folk music, Gospel
- Songwriter: Unknown

"The Wayfaring Stranger" (also known as "Poor Wayfaring Stranger", "I Am a Poor Wayfaring Stranger", or "Wayfaring Pilgrim"), Roud 3339, is a well-known American folk and gospel song likely originating in the early 19th century about a plaintive soul on the journey through life. As with most folk songs, many variations of the lyrics exist, and many singers have linked the song to times of hardship and notable experiences in their lives, such as the case with Burl Ives in his autobiography.

Members of the Western Writers of America chose it as one of the Top 100 Western songs of all time.

== History ==
The origins of the song are unclear and it may have multiple influences. In 1905, composer Samuel Coleridge-Taylor included “I Am a Poor, Wayfaring Stranger” (under the title “Pilgrim’s Song”) in a set of piano arrangements. It may be a descendant of the Scottish border ballad "The Dowie Dens of Yarrow", or the German hymn "Ich bin ein Gast auf Erden" ("A Pilgrim Here I Wander").The latter was translated and printed in many English hymnals throughout the 19th century.

According to the book The Makers of the Sacred Harp, by David Warren Steel and Richard H. Hulan, the lyrics were published in 1858 in Joseph Bever's Christian Songster, which was a collection of popular hymns and spiritual songs of the time.

During and for several years after the American Civil War, the lyrics were known as the Libby Prison Hymn. This was because the words had been inscribed by a dying Union soldier incarcerated in Libby Prison, a warehouse converted to a Confederate prison in Richmond, Virginia.

== Notable versions ==
- It became one of Burl Ives' signature songs, included on his 1944 album The Wayfaring Stranger. Ives used it as the title of his early 1940s CBS radio show and his 1948 autobiography.
- Paul Robeson performed this song in his acclaimed 1945 and 1947 New York concerts. The son of a slave, Robeson performed the selection in a style reminiscent of the "Negro spirituals" of the 19th Century. The recording is featured with many other spirituals in the "Power and the Glory" collection.
- It features on Pete Seeger's Frontier Ballads album, along with "The Wayfaring Stranger".
- Connie Smith recorded the song, referred to as "Wayfaring Pilgrim", for her 1966 album Connie Smith Sings Great Sacred Songs.
- Tim Buckley performed the song live many times during his career, including during his 1968 live in London concert.
- In 1969, the French singer Marie Laforêt recorded a ballad-style version of the song, accompanied on the charango by the Argentinian musician Jorge Milchberg.
- Noel Pointer, an African-American jazz violinist, recorded it on his album Phantazia in 1977.
- Jo Stafford features the song on her influential 1950 album American Folk Songs.
- Joan Baez recorded the song in her David's Album from 1969.
- Emmylou Harris covered the song on her 1980 album Roses in the Snow. Harris' version peaked at number 7 on the Billboard Hot Country Singles chart. It reached number 1 on the RPM Country Tracks chart in Canada.
- A version by Eva Cassidy was released posthumously in 1998 on the album Songbird.
- Charlie Haden sang this song to a string accompaniment by Alan Broadbent on the Quartet West album, The Art of the Song released in 1999 by PolyGram.
- Another popular version of the song was released by Johnny Cash in 2000 as part of his album American III: Solitary Man.
- Jack White performed the song as his character Georgia in the 2003 film Cold Mountain and the song was included on the film's soundtrack.
- Natalie Merchant recorded a version on her 2003 album The House Carpenter's Daughter.
- Jamie Woon recorded an a cappella arrangement of the song in 2006, which gained wider recognition after being remixed by elusive producer Burial in 2007 and covered frequently by Ed Sheeran during his commercial breakthrough, including on his 2011 EP One Take.
- The song is featured in the 2012 Belgian film The Broken Circle Breakdown.
- In 2015, the Norwegian bluegrass ensemble, Hayde Bluegrass Orchestra, inspired by the music of the film The Broken Circle Breakdown, released a cover of the song on YouTube which garnered over five million views. A video on YouTube of Hayde Bluegrass Orchestra performing The Wayfaring Stranger during their later 2018 live performance at John Dee would be viewed an additional 1.8 million times.
- The song, referred to as "I Am a Poor Wayfaring Stranger", was featured in the 2019 World War I drama 1917. It was performed by actor and singer Jos Slovick. In February 2020, a Change.org petition collected over 2,500 signatures to urge film producers, Universal Pictures and DreamWorks Pictures to release a full studio version of Slovick's performance. The studio version was published in March 2020.
- For the soundtrack of the 2020 video game The Last of Us Part II, actors Ashley Johnson and Troy Baker, as their characters Ellie and Joel, performed the song over the end credits in the main campaign with additional lyrics.
- Bluegrass family band, The Petersens, released a live performance recording of The Wayfaring Stranger in November 2021, garnering over 1.2 million views on YouTube, and included the song on their album, Live Sessions, Vol. 4.
- The Longest Johns in 2022 released a cover of the song as a part of their Smoke & Oakum album, and released an alternate recording version for their Made of Ale live sessions.
- The Tabernacle Choir at Temple Square recorded this song as part of their album Peace Like a River in an arrangement written by Mack Wilberg.
- Reverend Kristin Michael Hayter recorded a four-verse version of the song for her album SAVED!, under the "The Poor Wayfaring Stranger" title.
- Poor Man's Poison recorded this song as part of their album Providence.
- The Platinum Tears in 2023 recorded a version for the soundtrack to the Documentary The Murals by TG Jamroz
- Also featured in the CBS television series Tracker, Season 2 episode 5.
- 2024, experimental folk artist Fern Maddie's version was used as the title song of the film Wayfaring Stranger by Andrea Luka Zimmerman.
- Use as the opening title theme in the Dutch series "Black Tulip" (Dutch: Zwarte Tulp), 2015–16, Shelby Lynn
- American psychedelic rock band H. P. Lovecraft opens their 1967 debut album with the song, arranged by George Edwards. It was issued as a single ahead of the album release.
- In the 2026 action movie Hellfire, the traditional folk gospel song “Poor Wayfaring Stranger” serves as the core leitmotif for the protagonist (played by Stephen Lang). Composer Stephen Edwards wove variations of the song throughout the film, utilizing banjo-centric instrumentals, humming, and violin tracks, while a full vocal and instrumental rendition by Mean Mary plays over the final scene and end credits.
- In 1988, the Scottish band The Silencers covered this song on their second studio album, "A Blues for Buddha."
