= Gobble =

Gobble or Gobbles may refer to:

- Jimmy Gobble, Major League Baseball pitcher
- A turkey call
- A slang word for eating quickly
- A slang word for fellatio
- a group of 48 bits
- Gobbles, a fictional turkey in the South Park episode Helen Keller! The Musical
- Gobbles, a fictional dinosaur in Gameoverse
