= Winky Hicks =

American bluegrass musician and instrument maker

James "Winky" Hicks
- Born: March 23, 1953; Grove Hill, Alabama, U.S.
- Died: December 6, 2025 (aged 72)
- Occupations: Bluegrass musician; instrument maker
- Years active: 1960s–present
- Known for: Frontier Bluegrass band; maker of mandolins, banjos, fiddles, guitars; turkey yelpers

James "Winky" Hicks (March 23, 1953 - December 6, 2025) was a bluegrass musician and instrument maker from Grove Hill, Alabama.

Hicks started playing guitar at the age of 7. He learned to play bluegrass by watching his father play and picked up techniques by listening to Earl Scruggs and others on the Grand Ole Opry. An uncle gave him the "Winky" nickname.

Hicks was a regular at fiddlers festivals, where he played the banjo with his band, the Frontier Bluegrass.

He started making bluegrass string instruments in 2000. By 2019 he had constructed more than 200 mandolins, banjos, fiddles, and guitars. In 2011, he was named a "Black Belt Treasured Artist" by the Black Belt Treasures Cultural Arts Center, a non-profit from Camden, Alabama. In 2019, he built a guitar, painted by a local artist, to commemorate Alabama's 2018 national championship; the guitar, signed by Nick Saban, fetched $3,500 in an auction with proceeds going to Saban's charity, Nick's Kids.

He also made turkey yelpers.
