= Hutong Yellow Weasels =

Beijing-based traditional American string band

Hutong Yellow Weasels (胡同黄鼠狼)
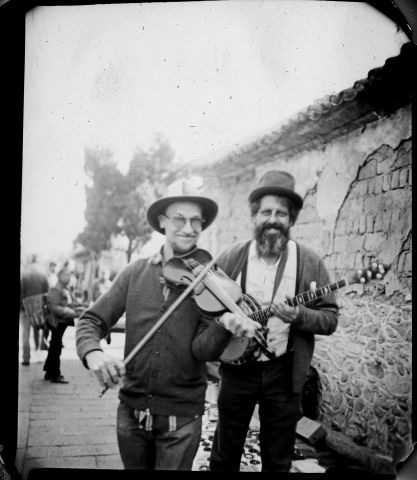
- Kirk Kenney and Chris Hawke of the Beijing-based string band Hutong Yellow Weasels 胡同黄鼠狼 in Dali Yunnan in February 2014

Background information
- Origin: Beijing, China
- Genres: old-time, bluegrass fiddle tunes square dance
- Years active: 2012-present
- Members: Chris Hawke - lead vocals, double bass, guitar, banjo Kirk Kenney - fiddle, guitar, vocals
- Past members: Becky Lipscombe - fiddle Travis Klingberg - banjo Parker Trevathan - Mandolin; Michael Ismerio - fiddle Sarah Peel - vocals Antonio Marin - banjo
- Website: Official Website

The Hutong Yellow Weasels (Chinese: 胡同黄鼠狼) are a Beijing-based traditional American string band, notable for being the first band to tour throughout China introducing square dance music to the Chinese public. Founded in Beijing in 2011 by Chris Hawke (vocals, double bass, guitar, banjo) and Kirk Kenney (fiddle, guitar, vocals), the band incorporates a rotating cast of expat musicians to increase their numbers during live shows, and plays traditional American pre-war Appalachian folk music. Chinese square dancing clubs, using recorded music and catering to elderly Chinese, have existed in Beijing for at least a decade. However, the first time members of these clubs heard live square dancing music was in November 2012 when the Weasels and visiting old time fiddler Michael Ismerio toured through universities, nightclubs and festivals throughout China. The tour took the band through Beijing, Shanghai, Suzhou, Hangzhou, Dali, Xinsheng, Xian, and Guizhou. As of 2015, the band was touring and holding square dances around the country, exposing many Chinese people to traditional instruments like the banjo and mandolin, and traditional Appalachian music for the first time.

The band has been written up in the English versions of two of China's largest state-run media organizations, Xinhua News Agency and the Global Times. They frequently play to Chinese audiences, with Hawke calling the dances in Chinese—the first foreign caller to do so. Typically, most people in the audience have never seen a banjo or mandolin, nor heard a violin played in a non-classical or pop-music context.

== Discography ==
"Hutong Yellow Weasels" (2013)

"Nihowdy" (2014)
