= Rick Franklin =

American singer

- Born: Frederick Franklin; March 16, 1952 (age 74); Alexandria, Virginia, United States
- Genres: Piedmont blues
- Occupations: Guitarist, singer, songwriter
- Instruments: Guitar, human voice
- Years active: 1981–present
- Website: http://hokumblues.com/

Frederick "Rick" Franklin (born March 16, 1952) is an American Piedmont blues guitarist, singer and songwriter. With various other musicians, Franklin has released four albums to date and works as a blues musicologist.

== Life and career ==
Franklin was born in Alexandria, Virginia, United States, in a military family. After traveling across the United States and the United Kingdom in his early years, his father's retirement from military service saw the family finally settle down in Virginia in 1968. The young Franklin was influenced by the music of Blind Blake, Bo Carter, Mississippi John Hurt, Big Bill Broonzy, Georgia Tom and Tampa Red.

He relocated to Arlington County, Virginia, where he still resides and, since 1981, has performed his version of Piedmont blues at various community events, clubs and music festivals. His latter day musical associates included John Cephas, John Jackson, and Archie Edwards. In addition to performing, Franklin has taught blues guitar playing, and been on the Euroblues Promotions Blues Week, Port Townsend Blues Week, and the Augusta Heritage Center Blues Week faculties. Franklin was an executive board member of the DC Blues Society and helped to organize and appeared at the first annual DC Blues Society Blues Festival. He has also contributed to the periodical publications from the DC Blues Society.

His festival appearances include the Washington Folk Festival, Northern Virginia Folk Festival, Columbia Pike Blues Festival, Herndon Blues Festival, Old Songs Festival (Altamont, New York), Port Townsend Country Blues Festival (Port Townsend, Washington), Kastav Blues Festival (Croatia), plus the Bristol Rhythm and Roots Festival (Bristol, Virginia). In addition to solo appearances, Franklin has performed as a duo with the harmonica player Phil Wiggins. He has appeared throughout the Washington metropolitan area.

In 1998, Franklin with Neil Harpe recorded the acoustic album, Doin' The Dozens. The expanded line-up of Franklin, Harpe, and Usilton released Hokum Blues the following year, and appeared on cable television for the Arlington, Fairfax and Montgomery Counties. The acoustic blues trio billed as Rick Franklin and His Delta Blues Boys concentrate on music and songs from the 1920s and 1930s, and have played monthly in Arlington since 2005.

Searching for Frank (2007) was Franklin's third album, confirming his status as a blues musicologist by reviving the work of Frank Stokes. It was a joint project with local musician Mike Baytop. Franklin's most recent album, Dancing With My Baby, a work involving Tom Mindte, was released by Patuxent Music in September 2013.

== Discography ==
=== Albums ===
| Year | Title | Record label | Credited to |
|---|---|---|---|
| 1998 | Doin' The Dozens | Patuxent Music | Franklin & Harpe |
| 1999 | Hokum Blues | Patuxent Music | Franklin, Harpe and Usilton |
| 2007 | Searchin' for Frank | Patuxent Music | Franklin & Baytop |
| 2013 | Dancing With My Baby | Patuxent Music | Rick Franklin & Tom Mindte |

== See also ==
- List of Piedmont blues musicians
