= Good Old Guard Gospel Singers =

American bluegrass band

The Good Old Guard Gospel Singers are a bluegrass group from Garfield County, Colorado. Their music tends toward political satire. The four members of this band are Don Kaufman, Don Paine, April Paine, and Dustin Micheli. They also play in a group called Defiance Stringband.

== EnCana Controversy ==
A song, EnCana Bluegrass Blues (a takeoff on the Dillards song, Old Home Place), written and performed by the Good Old Guard Gospel Singers, was critical of development and pollution said to have been caused by the EnCana Corporation. In response to threats by employees of EnCana, the bluegrass group has avoided playing in establishments frequented by EnCana workers.
