= Heartbreak Hill (band) =

Canadian bluegrass band

Heartbreak Hill was a Canadian bluegrass music band based in Toronto, Ontario. Members of the band were lead singer/bassist Jenny Whiteley, her brother Dan Whiteley on mandolin and guitar, banjoist Chris Quinn, and singer/guitarist Dottie Cormier.

== History ==
The Whiteleys, Quinn and Cormier performed in local venues and travelled together to a number of bluegrass festivals in 1994 and 1995. They formed Heartbreak Hill in 1996. By 1998 the band was performing weekly at the Silver Dollar Club in Toronto. That year they performed at the Stardust Picnic festival at Historic Fort York, Toronto, and independently released a self-titled album, produced by Chris Whitely. The album was nominated for a 1999 Juno Award.

Heartbreak Hill performed again at the Stardust Picnic in 1999, this time on the main stage, and also performed at the Tulip Festival in Ottawa.
