= Reece Shipley =

American country musician (1921–1998)

Reece Dodson Shipley (April 19, 1921 – May 8, 1998) was an American country singer and guitarist, noted for his 1952 singles "Hillbilly Jive with a Boogie Beat" and "Milk Bucket Boogie".

== Life ==
=== Childhood and Youth ===
Born in Whitesburg, Tennessee, Shipley was the son of string musicians. Reece (also known as "Reese" Shipley) was significantly influenced by the "Singing Cowboy" Gene Autry and Bob Wills. In the mid-1930s, Shipley played guitar in a band called The Carolina Pals. With this group, he performed at local events around Kingsport, Tennessee.

== Career ==
After the beginning of World War II, he joined the Seabees of the U.S. Navy. While serving in the Navy, he regularly entertained the troops on wartime radio. He was later transferred to California, where he met Gene Autry who would influence his own music.

Following the end of the war, Shipley returned to Tennessee and worked at the radio stations WOPI and WKPT of Bristol and Kingsport, respectively. In 1952, he had success with the single "Hillbilly Jive with a Boogie Beat". Another single released that year by Shipley, "Milk Bucket Boogie", was later covered by Red Foley. He later collaborated with The Rainbow Valley Boys and the Burleson Sisters. During the 1980s and 1990s, he often performed at venues in Johnson City, Knoxville and Kingsport. His album Tennessee Swing was released in 1995, and again in 2006 with two additional tracks by Patuxent Music.

Shipley died on May 8, 1998, at the age of 77. He was survived by his wife, Mary, and two daughters, Sandy and Anne. Mary died on February 12, 2017, at the age of 91.
