= Jordan Tice =

American guitarist and singer

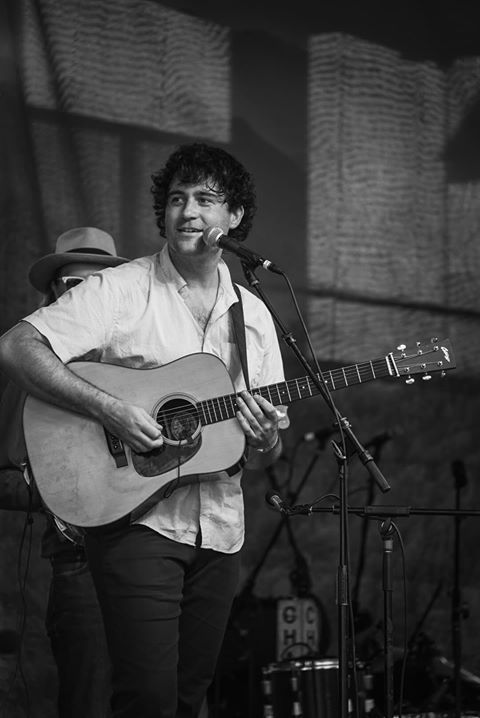
- Jordan Tice performs with Hawktail in Wilkesboro NC

Background information
- Born: April 9, 1987 (age 38)
- Origin: Annapolis, MD, USA
- Genres: Bluegrass, folk, Americana
- Instruments: Guitar, voice
- Years active: 2005-present
- Labels: Paddidle Records, Patuxent Music
- Website: jordantice.net

Jordan Andrew Tice (born April 9, 1987) is an American guitarist and vocalist based in Nashville, Tennessee. He is known for his solo work in the progressive bluegrass and Americana genres, and through collaborative projects such as Hawktail, which features Brittany Haas, Paul Kowert, and Dominick Leslie.

== Early life ==
Tice was born and raised in Annapolis, MD. His parents both played bluegrass music. His mother, Sue Raines, performed and recorded in the 1970s with Buffalo Gals, one of the earliest all-female bluegrass groups. Tice started out playing rock guitar but soon switched to taking jazz and classical lessons. He went on to earn a degree in music and composition from Towson University. He moved to Boston in 2009, then New York City from 2012 to 2015, and has been based in Nashville since 2015.

== Career ==
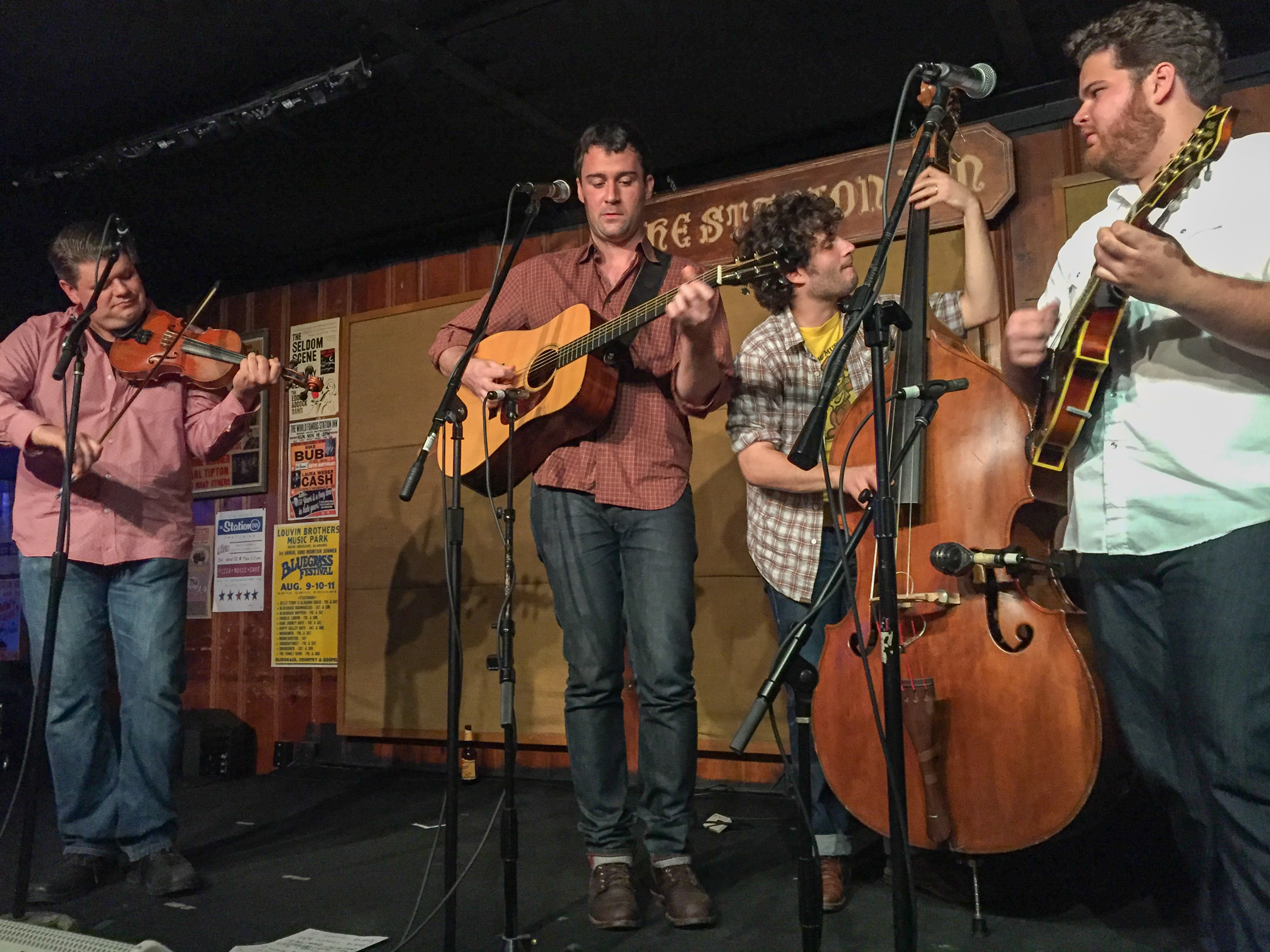
Jordan Tice and Horse County at The Station Inn, Nashville, 2016

Since 2005, Tice has released five solo records in addition to performing and recording on many collaborative projects. He has had a long relationship with Patuxent Music, a well known bluegrass label from Rockville, Maryland. His first three records were instrumental and featured many of his original compositions while Horse County was the first to feature singing. His most recent album, Motivational Speakeasy, was produced by Kenneth Pattengale of The Milk Carton Kids and released on Padiddle Records (founded by Paul Kowert of Punch Brothers).

In addition to his solo work, he has performed and recorded with the progressive instrumental roots band Hawktail, and its predecessor trio Haas Kowert Tice, as well as a trio composed of himself, banjoist Wes Corbett (Joy Kills Sorrow), and hammered dulcimer player Simon Chrisman. Tice has also played on records from Adam Hurt, Andrew Marlin (Mandolin Orange), David Rawlings Machine, and Carrie Newcomer. He played guitar on The John Hartford Fiddle Tune Project, Vol 1 which was nominated for a 2021 Grammy Award in the bluegrass category.

Some of his biggest early instrumental influences were progressive bluegrass musicians like Tony Rice and Béla Fleck and more recently songwriters with a traditional music background such as Norman Blake, John Hartford, and Bob Dylan. Tice has performed around the world and made appearances at festivals such as Telluride, Grey Fox, Strawberry Music Festival, and RockyGrass. In 2012, alongside Tony Trischka he performed the music for Steve Martin's score for As You Like It (Shakespeare in the Park). He also frequently performs with Yola, including on her Tiny Desk (From Home) show.

American Songwriter noted that Motivational Speakeasy conveys Tice's "considerable evolution as one of the prime movers of the modern newgrass movement." Main Street Nashville wrote that "Motivational Speakeasy is like nothing you’ve ever heard before. He is a musicians’ musician playing exactly as he pleases, and the end result is nothing short of remarkable." PopMatters highlighted his song "Bad Little Idea" and wrote that "for one as musically adept as him... the intricacies of his performance are best met by a feeling of irreverence." The Seattle Post-Intelligencer praised Tice's new solo work as "a reminder of how much you can accomplish with just a guitar, a compelling voice, and a batch of appealing songs.

== Discography ==
=== Solo ===
- Motivational Speakeasy (2020)
- Horse County (2016)
- The Secret History (2011)
- Long Story (2008)
- No Place Better (2006)

=== with Hawktail ===
- Place of Growth (2022)
- Formations (2020)
- Unless (2018)

=== with Haas Kowert Tice ===
- You Got This (2014)

=== other recording projects ===
- Väsen & Hawktail (2024), Väsen
- Fire and Fable (2021), Andrew Marlin
- Witching Hour (2021), Andrew Marlin
- Back to the Earth (2020), Adam Hurt
- Alexa Wildish (2020), Alexa Wildish
- The John Hartford Fiddle Tune Project, Vol 1 (2020), various artists
- The Beautiful Not Yet (2016), Carrie Newcomer
- Nashville Obsolete (2015), Dave Rawlings Machine
- Corbett/Chrisman/Tice (2008), Corbett/Chrisman/Tice
- Ownself Blues (2008), Frank Wakefield
