= The Beef Seeds =

British country music and bluegrass band

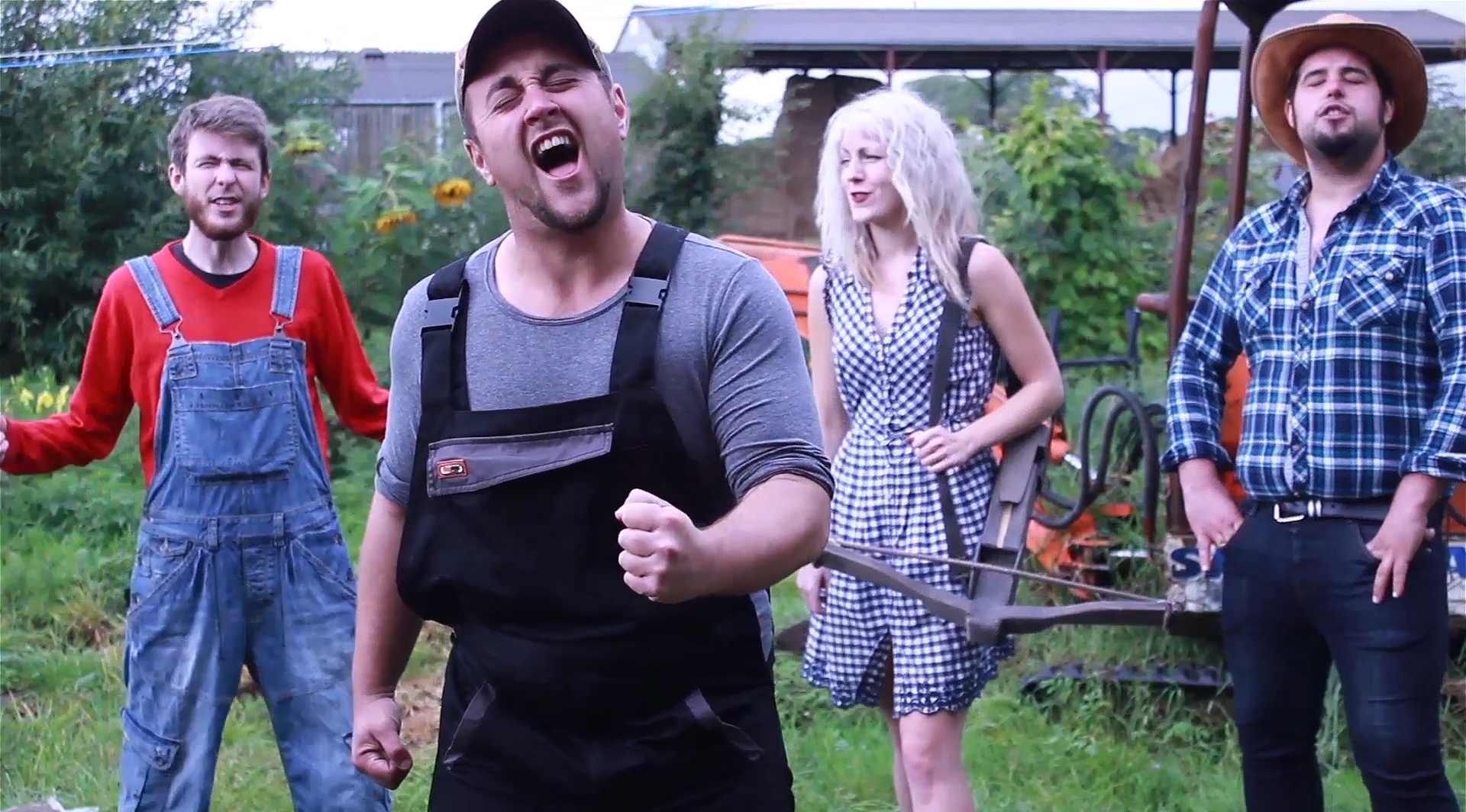
- The Beef Seeds in 2013 (from L-R: Scott "Showman" Bowman, Peet "Bongo Peet" Morgan, Becky "Miss Becky" Johnson, Adam Beale)

Background information
- Origin: Newport, South Wales, Wales
- Genres: Pop, bluegrass, country
- Years active: 2013–2015
- Labels: Ryde/. Digital Media
- Members: Peet "Bongo Peet" Morgan, Becky "Miss Becky" Johnson, Scott "Showman" Bowman, Adam Beale

The Beef Seeds were a British country music and bluegrass band which was an artist collaboration project with Ryde/. Digital Media focusing on digital platforms that has achieved worldwide status and global media recognition. The band hails from Newport, South Wales, it was formed in early 2013, and it records and publishes cover videos on its YouTube channel. The band's line-up consists of Peet "Bongo Peet" Morgan, Becky "Miss Becky" Johnson, Scott "Showman" Bowman, and Adam Beale. The band all live together in the same house with their dog Ninja, a Staffordshire Bull Terrier-Chihuahua cross who is also the mascot of the band making regular appearances in the videos. Instruments used in their songs include the Guitar, Mandolin, Banjo, Double bass, Harmonica, Washboard, and the Double washboard, which band frontman Peet Morgan invented himself.

The Beef Seeds' bluegrass cover of "Royals" by Lorde received praise from MTV Italy, which featured the video on their website and from multiple US radio stations including San Francisco radio station 97.3-FM (KLLC) and from Australian news site Daily Life, which described it as an "twangy" and "harmony-laden." In early 2014, it was mentioned on major Brazilian portal and Internet service provider Globo.com.

The Beef Seeds' various videos that are published on their YouTube site have collectively been watched more than two million times. The Beef Seeds were looking to tour the United States in 2014.

Notably, The Beef Seeds' version of The Pogues' Christmas classic, "Fairytale of New York," which they aptly renamed "Fairytale of Newport" (as a hat tip to their own town of Newport in South Wales), has become a festive online hit. The music video follows the band and their official mascot, Ninja, around Newport's city centre.

On 22 October 2013, RyanSecrest.com announced a contest to determine music fans' favourite cover version of Swedish DJ Avicii's hit single, "Wake Me Up." A total of fifteen artists' cover versions of this song, including The Beef Seeds' version, were included for voting by readers of the site. On 17 December 2013, Ryansecrest.com announced that the contest had been won by The Beef Seeds.

== Musical style and influences ==
The Beef Seeds do their own blend of pop, bluegrass, and country. Frontman Bongo Peet has stated, in an interview with the South Wales Argus, "We take the pop song and then dissect it and break it down."

== Band members ==
- Peet "Bongo Peet" Morgan – Vocals/Washboard/Double Washboard
- Becky "Miss Becky" Johnson – Vocals/Bass
- Scott 'Showman' Bowman – Vocals/Banjo/Mandolin/Harmonica
- Adam Beale – Vocals/Guitar

== Discography ==
Studio albums

- "Rhythm and Moos" (released 1 May 2014 on iTunes)

EPs

- Songs From The Campfire (EP) (released 30 September 2013 on iTunes)
- Keepin' it Beefy (EP) (released 27 January 2014 on iTunes)

Singles

- "Royals" (single) (released 18 October 2013 on iTunes)
- "Africa" (single) (released 3 November 2013 on iTunes)
- "Livin' on a Prayer" (single) (released 3 November 2013 on iTunes)
- "Wrecking Ball" (single) (released 3 November 2013 on iTunes)
- "Counting Stars" (single) (released 11 November 2013 on iTunes)
- "Gorilla" (single) (released 11 November 2013 on iTunes)
- "Story of My Life" (single) (released 16 November 2013 on iTunes)
- "The Fox (What Does The Fox Say?)" (single) (released 25 November 2013 on iTunes)
- "Fairytale of New York" (single) (released 2 December 2013 on iTunes)
- "All I Want For Christmas Is You" (single) (released 9 December 2013 on iTunes)

== Videography ==
- Avicii – Wake Me Up (Official Beef Seeds Cover)
- The Wanted – We Own The Night (Official Beef Seeds Cover)
- Robin Thicke – Blurred Lines (Official Beef Seeds Cover)
- Ellie Goulding – Burn (Official Beef Seeds Cover)
- Katy Perry – Roar (Official Beef Seeds Cover)
- Union J – Beautiful Life (Official Beef Seeds Cover)
- Bon Jovi – Livin' on a Prayer (Official Beef Seeds Cover)
- Toto – Africa (Official Beef Seeds Cover)
- Lorde – Royals (Official Beef Seeds Cover)
- Miley Cyrus – Wrecking Ball (Official Beef Seeds Cover)
- Miley Cyrus – We Can't Stop (Official Beef Seeds Cover)
- Bruno Mars – Gorilla (feat. Benji Webbe) (Official Beef Seeds Cover)
- OneRepublic – Counting Stars (Official Beef Seeds Cover)
- One Direction – Story of My Life (Official Beef Seeds Cover)
- Ylvis – The Fox (What Does The Fox Say) (Official Beef Seeds Cover)
- The Pogues – Fairytale of New York/Newport (Official Beef Seeds Cover)
- Mariah Carey – All I Want For Christmas Is You (Official Beef Seeds Cover)
- Pitbull ft. Ke$ha – Timber (Official Beef Seeds Cover)
- Pharrell Williams – Happy (Official Beef Seeds Cover)
- Avicii – Hey Brother (Official Beef Seeds Cover)
- Eminem ft. Rihanna – The Monster (Official Beef Seeds Cover)
- Bastille – Pompeii (Official Beef Seeds Cover)
- Lorde – Royals (Official Beef Seeds Cover, recorded LIVE at BBC Cymru Wales, the Welsh division of BBC Radio)
- Daft Punk – Get Lucky (Official Beef Seeds Cover)
- Journey – Don't Stop Believin' (Official Beef Seeds Cover)
- Jason Derulo – Talk Dirty (Official Beef Seeds Cover)
- The Beef Seeds – Dueling Banjos – Burning Chariot Photo Shoot (Behind The Scenes)
- 5 seconds of summer – She Looks So Perfect (Official Beef Seeds Cover)
- Rusted Root – Send Me on My Way (Official Beef Seeds Cover)
- Katy Perry – Dark Horse (Official Beef Seeds Cover)
- Disney's Frozen – Let It Go (Official Beef Seeds Cover)
