= Peace Like a River (album) =

Studio album by Mormon Tabernacle Choir and Orchestra at Temple Square
- Released: March 2004
- Producer: Mack Wilberg

Peace Like a River is a studio album released by the Mormon Tabernacle Choir and Orchestra at Temple Square. The album was released in 2004.

== Track listing ==
1. Sweet Peace
  Music: English Folk Song
  Text: David Warner
  Arrangement: Mack Wilberg
  2:31
2. Be Still, My Soul
  Music: Jean Sibelius
  Text: Katharina von Schlegel (trans. Jane Borthwick)
  Arrangement: Mack Wilberg
  4:52
3. Peace Like a River
  Music: African-American Spiritual
  Arrangement: Mack Wilberg
  4:31
4. All Things Bright and Beautiful
  Music: John Rutter
  Text: Mrs. C. F. Alexander
  2:45
5. The Lord Is My Shepherd
  Music: Thomas Koschat
  Text: James Montgomery
  Arrangement: Mack Wilberg
  4:33
6. This Is My Father's World
  Music: Trad. English Melody (adapt. Franklin L. Sheppard)
  Text: Maltbie D. Babcock
  Arrangement: Mack Wilberg
  3:24
7. Wayfarin' Stranger
  Music: American Folk Hymn
  Arrangement: Mack Wilberg
  4:12
8. Lord, Make Me an Instrument of Thy Peace
  Music: John Rutter
  Text: St. Francis of Assisi
  3:04
9. Swing Low, Sweet Chariot
  Music: African-American Spiritual
  Arrangement: Alice Parker and Robert Shaw
  3:25
10. Deep River
  Music: American Folk Hymn
  Arrangement: Mack Wilberg
  4:10
11. The Lamb
  Music: John Tavener
  Text: William Blake
  3:43
12. A Child's Prayer
  Music: Janice Kapp Perry
  Text: Janice Kapp Perry
  Orchestration: Barlow Bradford
  3:55
13. It Is Well with My Soul
  Music: Philip B. Bliss
  Text: Horatio Gates Spafford
  Arrangement: Michael Davis
  Additional Lyrics: Michael Davis
  5:06
14. Count Your Blessings (Instead of Sheep)
  Music: Irving Berlin
  Text: Irving Berlin
  Arrangement: Michael Davis
  3:55
15. A Gaelic Blessing
  Music: John Rutter
  Text: Adapted from an old Gaelic rune
  2:04
16. Thou Gracious God, Whose Mercy Lends
  Music: English Folk Tune
  Text: Oliver Wendell Holmes Sr.
  Arrangement: Mack Wilberg
  5:01
17. Come, Let Us Anew
  Music: attributed to James Lucas
  Text: Charles Wesley
  Arrangement: Mack Wilberg
  5:07

== Charts ==
Chart (2004)	Peak position
Billboard Classical	7
