= Whitesburg, Tennessee =

Whitesburg
- Unincorporated community
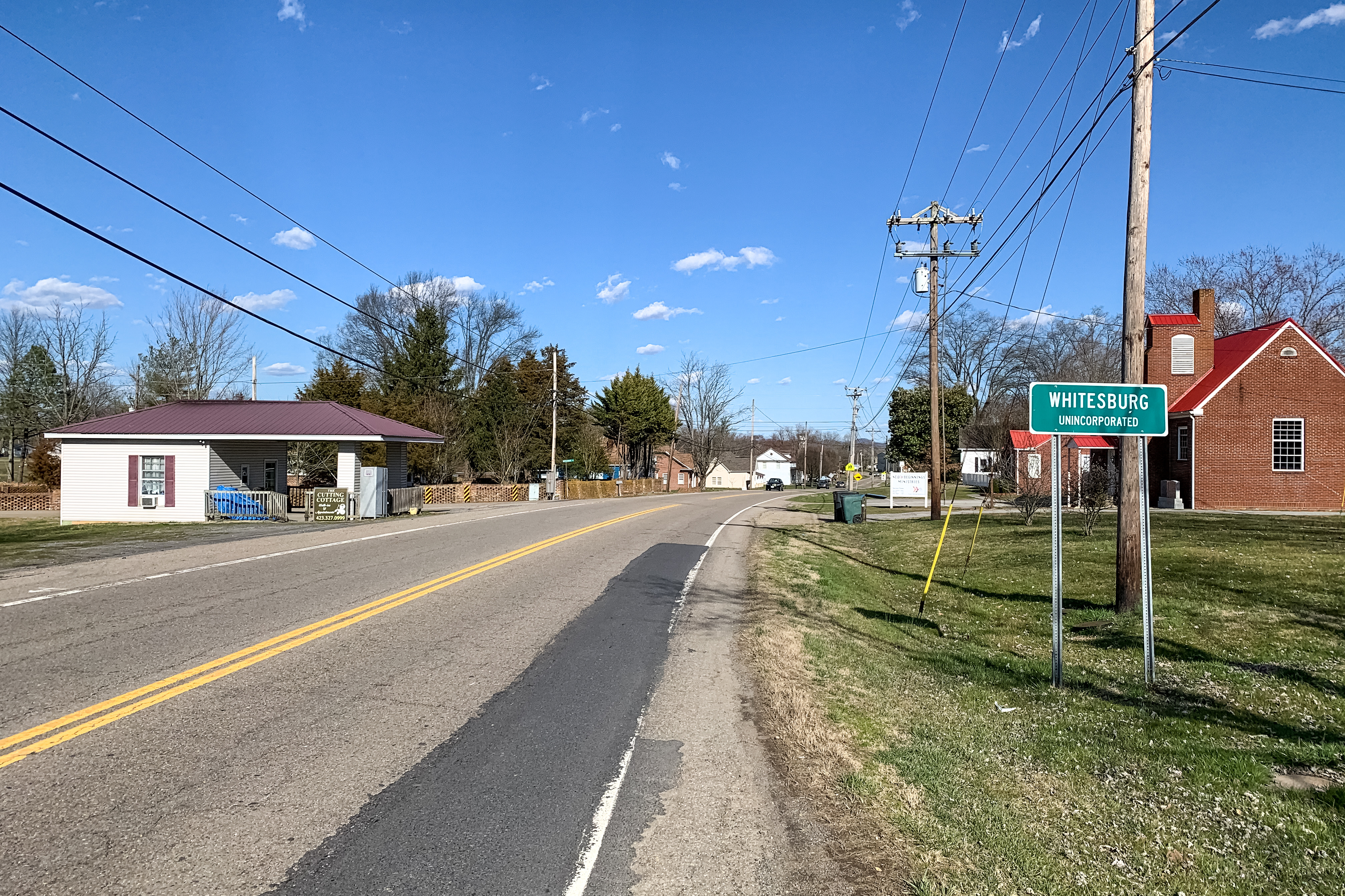
- U.S. Route 11E (Andrew Johnson Highway) in Whitesburg

- Location within Tennessee Location within the United States
- Coordinates: 36°16′18″N 83°08′24″W
- Country: United States
- State: Tennessee
- County: Hamblen
- Time zone: UTC-5 (Eastern (EST))
  - Summer (DST): UTC-4 (EDT)
- ZIP codes: 37891

Whitesburg is an unincorporated community in eastern Hamblen County, Tennessee and inside Hawkins County as well. The small, rural community is located along U.S. Route 11E. Whitesburg is bordered by Russellville on the west and Bulls Gap on the east. A U.S. post office and two schools, both parts of the Hamblen County school system, are located in Whitesburg.

== Education ==
Whitesburg is home to two schools:

- Whitesburg Elementary
- East Ridge Middle School

== Notable people ==
- Reece Shipley (1921–1998), American country musician
- Edward R. Talley, Medal of Honor recipient WWI. Depending on the reference, Edward R. Talley was born on either September 6 or 8, 1890 in Russellville, Tennessee. He joined the United States Army from Russellville and after completing recruit training was sent to France where he distinguished himself in action near Ponchaux, France. He was a Sergeant, in Company L, 117th Infantry, 30th Division when he was awarded the Medal of Honor for his actions on October 7, 1918. Talley died December 14, 1950, and is buried at Bent Creek Cemetery in Whitesburg, Tennessee.
