= Donna Ulisse =

American singer-songwriter

- Origin: Hampton, Virginia, U.S.
- Genres: Country, bluegrass
- Occupation: Singer-songwriter
- Years active: 1991–present
- Labels: Atlantic; Hadley Music Group, Mountain Home

Donna Ulisse is an American country music and bluegrass singer-songwriter. Signed to Atlantic Records in 1991, she released her debut album, Trouble at the Door, that year and two singles which charted on the Billboard Hot Country Singles & Tracks chart. Ulisse filmed two videos, ‘Trouble At The Door’ and ‘Things Are Mostly Fine’, both of which were aired on CMT. Appearing on national TV shows Hee Haw, Nashville Now, Crook & Chase, and NBC's Hot Country Nights gained Ulisse acclaim.

Ulisse's debut album Trouble at the Door charted the singles "Things Are Mostly Fine" and "When Was the Last Time". The former received a positive review in Cash Box magazine which stated that she "generates a soothing ballad quilted with a powerful force of emotion and inspiration".

After leaving Atlantic Records in the early 1990’s, Ulisse took some time to reset. Returning back to the studio as a demo singer created an opportunity for Ulisse to capture the attention of Ray Johnson, art collector and dealer out of Minneapolis. Deciding he would champion Ulisse’s brand of music, Mr. Johnson formed a publishing company and created a platform for Donna to hone her songwriting skills. After consistently penning Appalachian creations, Kathy Sacra-Anderson, publisher and music director with Hadley Music Group, made the suggestion Donna record her mountain songs as a project and hired Keith Sewell to produce the 14 song collection and in 2007, released a new album of bluegrass songs as a project called 'When I Look Back' on Hadley Music Group. Ulisse toured with her band The Poor Mountain Boys performing at festivals and concert venues. From 2007-2015, she released nine albums with Hadley Music Group.

In 2016, Ulisse received her first International Bluegrass Music Association award for Songwriter Of The Year followed up by 2017 IBMA award for Song of the Year with "I Am A Drifter", co-written with Marc Rossi and recorded by Volume 5. In 2017 Donna signed with Mountain Home Music Company and released “Breakin’ Easy”, produced by bluegrass legend, Doyle Lawson. The opportunity to work with Mr. Lawson offered a much cherished working relationship for Ulisse. 2018, 2022 and 2023 also saw Ulisse win the Society for the Preservation of Bluegrass Music of America, SPBGMA's Songwriter of the Year award along with SPBGMA’s 2022 Female Vocalist of the Year award.

In 2019, Ulisse signed with a new bluegrass label, Billy Blue Records, an arm of Daywind and would release 3 albums; 'Time For Love’, “Livin’ Large” and “Mountain Lily”, once again joining forces with the great Doyle Lawson as producer and also dear friend Jerry Salley, acclaimed songwriter, artist and A & R for Billy Blue Records, producing 4 sides on the “Mountain Lily” project. During her time on Billy Blue Records, Ulisse would film 2 videos and earn Billy Blue Publishing their first Number One record!

In October of 2024, Ulisse signed with Turnberry Records.

== Discography ==
=== Albums ===
Title	Album details
Trouble at the Door	Release date: October 29, 1991; Label: Atlantic Records; Formats: CD, Cassette
When I Look Back	Release date: July 27, 2007; Label: Hadley Music Group; Formats: CD
Walk This Mountain Down	Release date: January 20, 2009; Label: Hadley Music Group; Formats: CD
Holy Waters	Release date: April 20, 2010; Label: Hadley Music Group; Formats: CD
An Easy Climb	Release date: June 14, 2011; Label: Hadley Music Group; Formats: CD
All The Way To Bethlehem	Release date: October 23, 2012; Label: Hadley Music Group; Formats: CD
I Am A Child Of God: A Gospel Collection	Release date: July 25, 2013; Label: Hadley Music Group; Formats: CD
Showin' My Roots	Release date: October 15, 2013; Label: Hadley Music Group; Formats: CD, music download
The Songwriter in Me: The Demo Recordings	Release date: March 24, 2015; Label: Hadley Music Group; Formats: CD, music download
Hard Cry Moon	Release date: September 25, 2015; Label: Hadley Music Group; Formats: CD, music download
Breakin' Easy	Release date: September 22, 2017; Label: Mountain Home Music Records; Formats: CD, music download
Time For Love	Release date: November 1, 2019; Label: Billy Blue Records; Formats: CD, music download
Livin' Large	Release date: February 25, 2022; Label: Billy Blue Records; Formats: CD, music download
Mountain Lily	Release date: February 23, 2024; Label: Billy Blue Records; Formats: CD, music download

=== Singles ===
Year	Single	Peak positions	Album
Year	Single	US Country	Album
1991	"Things Are Mostly Fine"	75	Trouble at the Door
1991	"When Was the Last Time"	66	Trouble at the Door
1992	"Trouble at the Door"	—	Trouble at the Door
2009	"The Trouble with You"	—	Walk This Mountain Down
"—" denotes releases that did not chart

=== Music videos ===
Year	Video	Director
1991	"Things Are Mostly Fine"	Richard Jernigan
1992	"Trouble At The Door"	Thom Oliphant
2020	"When I Go All Bluegrass On You"	
2021	"Livin' Large In A Little Town"	
