= Rautakoura =

Finnish bluegrass band

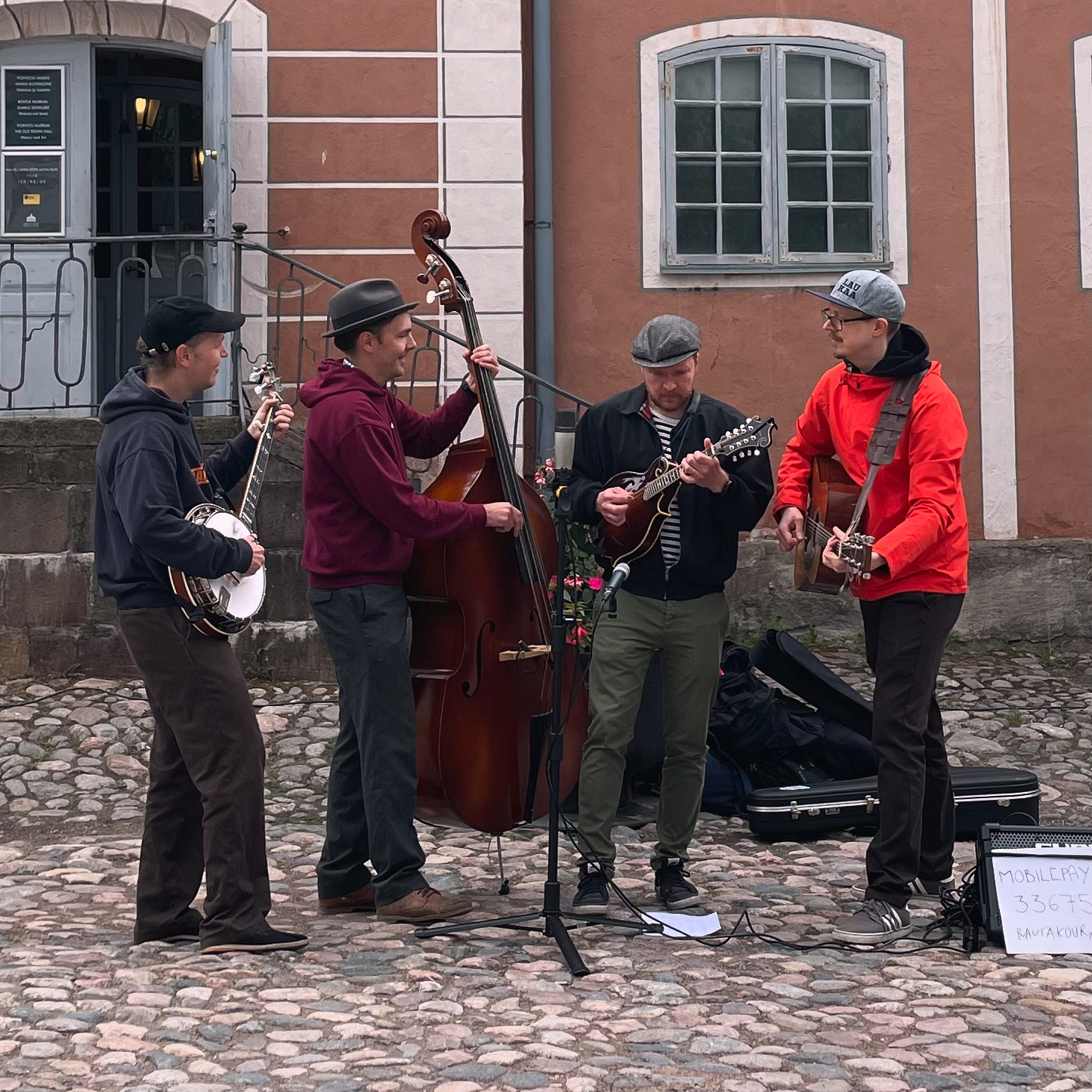
- Rautakoura busking in Porvoo, June 2024

Background information
- Origin: Helsinki, Finland
- Genres: bluegrass, folk, acoustic
- Years active: 2004–present
- Label: Levytalo
- Members: Juho Häme; Lauri Häme; Matti Mikkelä; Pekka Pyysalo
- Website: www.rautakoura.net

The Rautakoura is a bluegrass band from Helsinki, Finland, that was founded in 2004. Its members include Juho Häme (bass), Lauri Häme (banjo), Matti Mikkelä (mandolin and guitar) and Pekka Pyysalo (guitar).

Rautakoura participated in Uuden Musiikin Kilpailu in 2013.

== Discography ==
Rautakoura have released ten albums: Kaikki Peliin (2005), Rautakoura (2006), Maailman ympäri (2007), Kadulta (2008), Neljä vuodenaikaa (2010), Tien päällä taas (2013), Halifax (2015), Huipulla (2019), Ruovesi (2023) and Polku (2025).

Kaikki Peliin (2005)

1. Calvin Klein lumisateessa
2. Rotsi auki
3. Viimeinen sivu
4. Kaksoisvirtain maa
5. Pitkä päivä Apollovuorella
6. Arvonnan aika
7. Väliaika
8. Tähdet valkokankaalla
9. Työn iloa (Työmiehen avautuminen)
10. Yhteiskunnan muuli
11. Faaraon taika
12. Kaikki peliin

Rautakoura (2006)

1. Köydet irti
2. Matkalla etelään
3. Ruutitynnyri
4. Mies yli laidan
5. Aamuun asti
6. Aallon pohjalla
7. Hylätty majakka
8. Jäämerelle
9. Rahat tai henki!
10. Uutiset uudestaan
11. Paluu horisonttiin

Maailman ympäri (2007)

1. Varaslähtö
2. Kun pitää mennä
3. Maailman ympäri
4. Matkakuume
5. Maapallon ulkopuolella
6. Kevät
7. Perjantai
8. Lännen-Pekka
9. Kukaan ei tullut vastaan
10. Aurinko nousee idästä
11. Tarinoita matkalta

Kadulta (2008)

1. Kesän paras päivä
2. Hummeri
3. Seitsemän veljestä
4. Savimäki
5. Parola Iittala Toijala Viiala Lempäälä
6. Rankkasade
7. Viikonloppu
8. Kantola
9. Karkuri
10. Kulmilla
11. WBC
12. Iltatuli

Neljä vuodenaikaa (2010)

1. I
2. II
3. III
4. IV

Tien päällä taas (2013)

1. - 2. Aikamatkalla
2. Sateeseen
3. Tie vie
4. Tien päällä taas
5. Junamatkalla
6. Muukalainen
7. Vantaa
8. Pois pois
9. Vieras
10. Ilmalaivalla
11. Kesä

=== Halifax (2015) ===
1. Kotiinpaluu
2. Halifax
3. Matkalla etelään
4. Lautturin valssi
5. Saari
6. Maailman ympäri
7. Kaulaa myöten vedessä
8. Vapaapäivä
9. Myrskyn silmään
10. Kaksi kulkijaa
11. Aamuun asti
12. Vieras II

=== Huipulla (2019) ===
1. Huipulla
2. Syksy2
3. Robinhood
4. Ruosteinen
5. Höyrykoneita
6. Peltinen

=== Ruovesi (2023) ===
1. Aikarauta
2. Taivas saa odottaa
3. Lasken
4. Satamaan
5. Varjossa
6. Ruovesi

=== Polku (2025) ===
1. Muuttuvia polkuja
2. Kristallipallo
3. Polkuja
4. Hikinen iltapäivä
5. Kevät
6. Kengät2
7. Kaupunkiblues
