= Ila Auto =

Norwegian bluegrass band

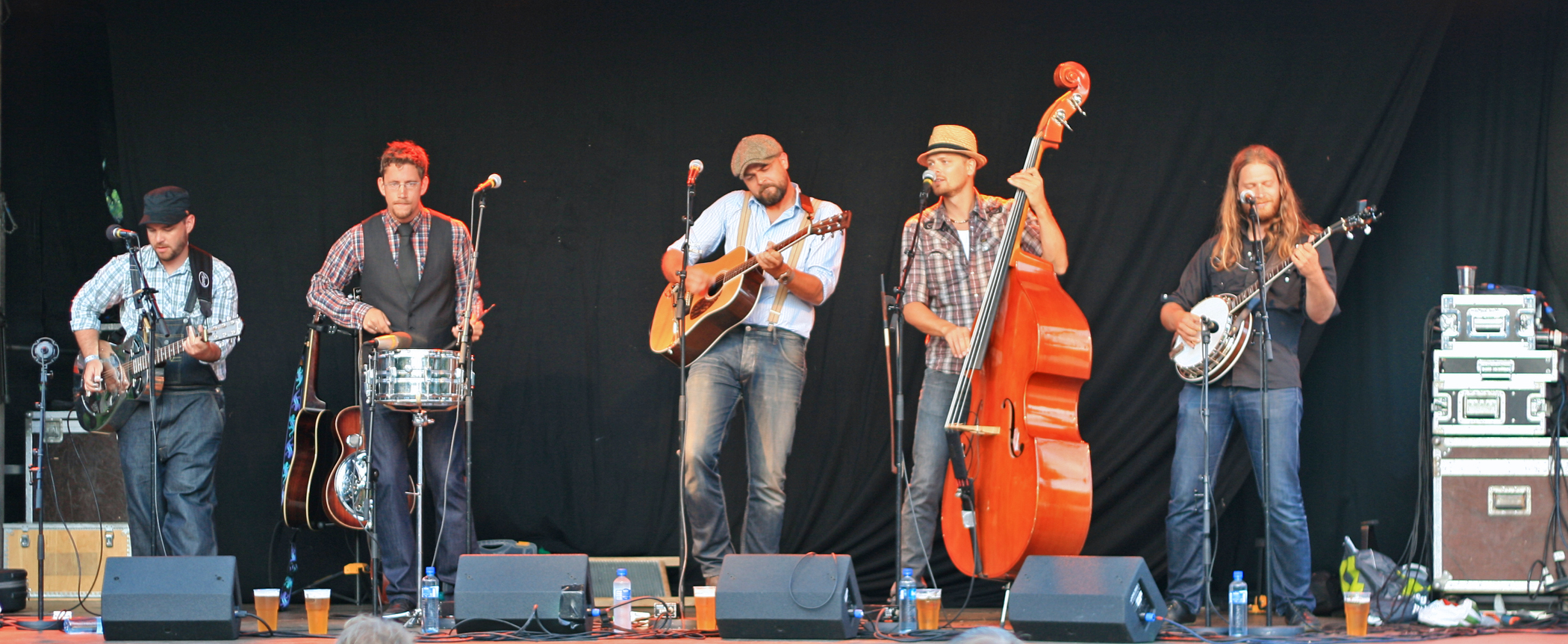
Ila Auto

Ila Auto is a Spellemannprisen winning bluegrass band from Oslo, Norway. The band was established in 2005.

== Discography ==
- If You Keep Pickin' it Might Never Heal (Auto Records, 2006)
- Over the Next Hill (Auto Records, 2008)
- Ila Auto (Auto Records, 2010)
