= Kathy Boyd and Phoenix Rising =

American bluegrass band

Kathy Boyd & Phoenix Rising is a group out of Salem, Oregon, led by bassist and singer Kathy Boyd, and also featuring Tim Crosby, Tom Tower, and Dennis Nelson. Their music is primarily bluegrass, and features songs written by all band members. They tour primarily in the Pacific Northwest and are a mainstay on the bluegrass circuit. They have been together since 2005 and have released six all original CDs during this time.

The band wrapped things up after 17 years with a standing room only concert at Trexler Farms. The quarantine saw the rise of the duo Phoenix (Tim and Kathy Crosby), who perform across the United States to this day.

== Awards ==
- 2017 Global Music Award Winner (Silver) for the album "40 Years of Lonesome" in Songwriting/Lyrics and album
- 2016 Global Music Award Winner (Silver) for the song "Who Will Pray For Me" (Songwriting/Lyrics - Kathy Boyd, BMI)
- 2016 Josie Music Award Nominee for Bluegrass Group of the Year and Bluegrass Song of the Year "Let Her Roll"
- 2016 International Music & Entertainment Association Bluegrass Song of the Year "Let Her Roll" (also nominated for Americana Song of the Year), Nominee's for Bluegrass Group of the Year
- 2015 International Music & Entertainment Association Bluegrass Group of the Year
- 2014 International Music & Entertainment Association Nominee's for Bluegrass Group of the Year, Holiday Album of the Year, and Holiday Song of the Year
- 2014 International Music & Entertainment Association Award Winner for Holiday Song of the Year (I'll Be Home for Christmas in the State of Oregon)
- 2010 Winners of the International City Love Music Contest with the Song "Twelve More Miles to Clatskanie"
- 2008 Roots Music Association Bluegrass Songwriter of the Year (Dennis Nelson)

== Recordings ==
(in CD format)

- 40 Years of Lonesome
- Lowground
- Spending Every Christmas With You
- Walk Humbly (gospel album)
- Stories never told
- Burning Down the House

(DVD)

- Bluegrass Christmas
