= The Lonesome Sisters =

American acoustic music duo

The Lonesome Sisters, Sarah Hawker and Debra Clifford, are an American acoustic music duo. They were voted Best Acoustic Duo of 2006 by Gibson Guitars. At Merlefest 2004 they performed and they won best country song in the Merlefest Chris Austin Songwriting Contest for Sarah's song, "Forgiveness." They have recorded six CDs on their own record label, Tin Halo Music. "Follow Me Down" was voted best original song in the Clifftop WV Appalachian Stringband Festival Songwriting Contest.

Sarah Hawker learned about traditional Appalachian singing from her aunt Ginny Hawker, traditional Appalachian singer, and her uncle Tracy Schwarz of the New Lost City Ramblers, as well as her grandfather, Ben Hawker, beloved Primitive Baptist singer and teacher, and teller of tall tales. Along with singing and songwriting, she plays guitar, clawhammer banjo and harmonium.

Debra Clifford has toured with Ginny Hawker & Tracy Schwarz, and is also a member of Old Buck, an old time music stringband with Riley Baugus on Banjo; Emily Schaad, fiddle; and Sabra Guzman, bass. The Old Buck CD was chosen by Scott Nygaard, editor of Acoustic Guitar magazine, as one of the best albums of 2013.

In 2012, Sarah and Debra recorded three new CDs: Deep Water, Lonesome Scenes with Riley Baugus, and Long Time Sun released as Sarah Hawker, which is a Kudalini Yoga CD.
