= Hayde Bluegrass Orchestra =

Bluegrass Ensemble from Norway

- Origin: Oslo, Norway
- Genres: Bluegrass; Americana; Folk
- Years active: 2015 – present
- Members: Rebekka Nilsson; Ole Engrav; Magnus Eriksrud; Moa Meinich; David Buverud; Emil Brattested; Sjur Marqvardsen
- Past members: Jonas Wøien Olsen; Joakim Borgen
- Website: www.hayde.no

Hayde Bluegrass Orchestra is an internationally-touring English-language bluegrass ensemble from Oslo, Norway, who have been nominated for a Norwegian grammy, and featured as international showcase artists.

== Origin, influences, and history ==
Hayde Bluegrass Orchestra performs with eight band members in the genres of folk, Americana, and bluegrass. The founding members were Joakim Borgen and Rebekka Nilsson, and the group's formation was inspired by the Belgian Oscar-nominated movie, The Broken Circle Breakdown. According to Lee Zimmerman of the website, Bluegrass Today:

"Ironically, the duo found certainly [sic] similarities between bluegrass and Norway’s native folk traditions, especially those sounds that connect them by way of British folk music and the traditional hymns. 'The fiddle — or more precisely the Hardanger fiddle, a Norwegian version that includes a double set of resonating strings — is very central to Norwegian folk music, along with a number of other harp-like string instruments,' Borgen explains."

John Lawless wrote of their Migrants album that the band often performs original compositions which blend "Appalachian and Nordic folk influences."

Arild Rønsen of Puls music magazine wrote of the band, "It is almost impossible to be more American than the Hayde Bluegrass Orchestra" and that they are among the first Norwegian artists to enter the Billboard bluegrass chart.

In 2024, co-founding member Joakim Borgen announced his departure from the group.

== Awards and honors ==
The band's album, Migrants, debuted at number four on the Billboard Bluegrass Chart on March 27, 2021.

Hayde Bluegrass Orchestra's 2021 album, Migrants, was nominated for a Norwegian grammy (also called a Spellemannprisen). In 2022, the band was an official showcase artist of the Folk Alliance International.

In 2022, the group was nominated for Band of the Year for the 2022 IBMA (International Bluegrass Music Awards) Momentum Award.

== Appearance in film and media ==
The group spent five years in the development of their first album, and have produced numerous videos on YouTube, including a full-length concert in 2018. Their 2015 music video of the American folk song, Wayfaring Stranger, had registered over five million views on YouTube as of January 2024.

The band's cover of the Everly Brothers' All I Have to Do is Dream, was featured in the Netflix animation, Lost Ollie.

== Members ==
Rebekka Nilsson – vocals

Ole Engrav – guitar

Magnus Eriksrud – banjo

Moa Meinich – fiddle

David Buverud – upright bass

Emil Brattested – Dobro

Sjur Marqvardsen – accordion

== Discography ==
Hayde Bluegrass Orchestra's album, "Migrants", was released in 2021.

In 2023, the group released the album, The Broken Circle Sessions.

== Tours ==
In 2015, the group toured the Netherlands twice.

In 2017, the group toured Ireland.
