= Jessie Baker =

American musician (born 1991)

- Born: February 7, 1991 (age 35)
- Origin: Martinsville, Indiana, U.S.
- Genre: Bluegrass
- Occupation: Musician
- Instruments: Banjo, guitar, mandolin, bass, vocals

Jessie Baker (born February 7, 1991) is an American musician known for bluegrass banjo. He describes his playing as "Scruggs-style and Don Reno." He currently resides in Carmel, Indiana. Jessie started banjo lessons in 2002, and went on to lead his family's band, "The Baker Boys."

In January, 2007, Jessie joined the Karl Shiflett and Big Country Show.

In August 2008 Baker joined the then current IBMA instrumental group of the year "Michael Cleveland and Flamekeeper". During Jessie's span with this group he helped the band win three more IBMA instrumental group of the year awards before departing in January 2011 to seek other employment. He played on the band's album, 'Fired Up!' which included original song, UnTrue Blues.

He has also worked stints with Marty Raybon and Full Circle, David Peterson, and Dove Award-winning Cody Shuler and Pine Mountain Railroad. He was also featured as a part of the Johnson Mountain Boys Reunion Project.

In June, 2009, Jessie released his debut solo album, "Yessir!" on the Patuxent Music record label.

In February 2011 Jessie moved on to be a part of the award-winning group Doyle Lawson and Quicksilver where he played on the making of two albums, 'Sing Me A Song About Jesus' and 'Drive Time'.

Jessie then joined Dailey & Vincent in April 2012 and has played on the band's album(s), 'Brothers of the Highway', 'Alive! In Concert' and ‘Patriots and Poets’. Many of his original songs have been featured and recorded by Dailey and Vincent and other bluegrass bands. He has also appeared on all episodes of both seasons of their television show, The Dailey & Vincent Show on RFD-TV. One of his original songs, Grey Matter, is featured on the 'Alive! In Concert' DVD as well as the TV show. Jessie departed from Dailey and Vincent in 2018.

Baker married his childhood sweetheart Gabrielle Bowers in July 2017.
