= Turkey call =

Vocalizations produced by a turkey bird

The term turkey call can refer to either the different vocalizations of the turkey or devices designed and used to imitate these sounds.

Vocalizations of wild turkeys include "gubles", "clucks", "putts", "purrs", "yelps", "cutts", "cackles", "kee-kees", "clulululud" and the coveted French call "glouglou".

Hunters learn to use several of these different vocalizations as there are various types of turkey calls available today, with it being unpredictable which type of sound a wild turkey will respond to at any given time. Hunters may learn turkey call techniques to attract a turkey to their location.

== Imitative devices ==
=== Pot calls ===
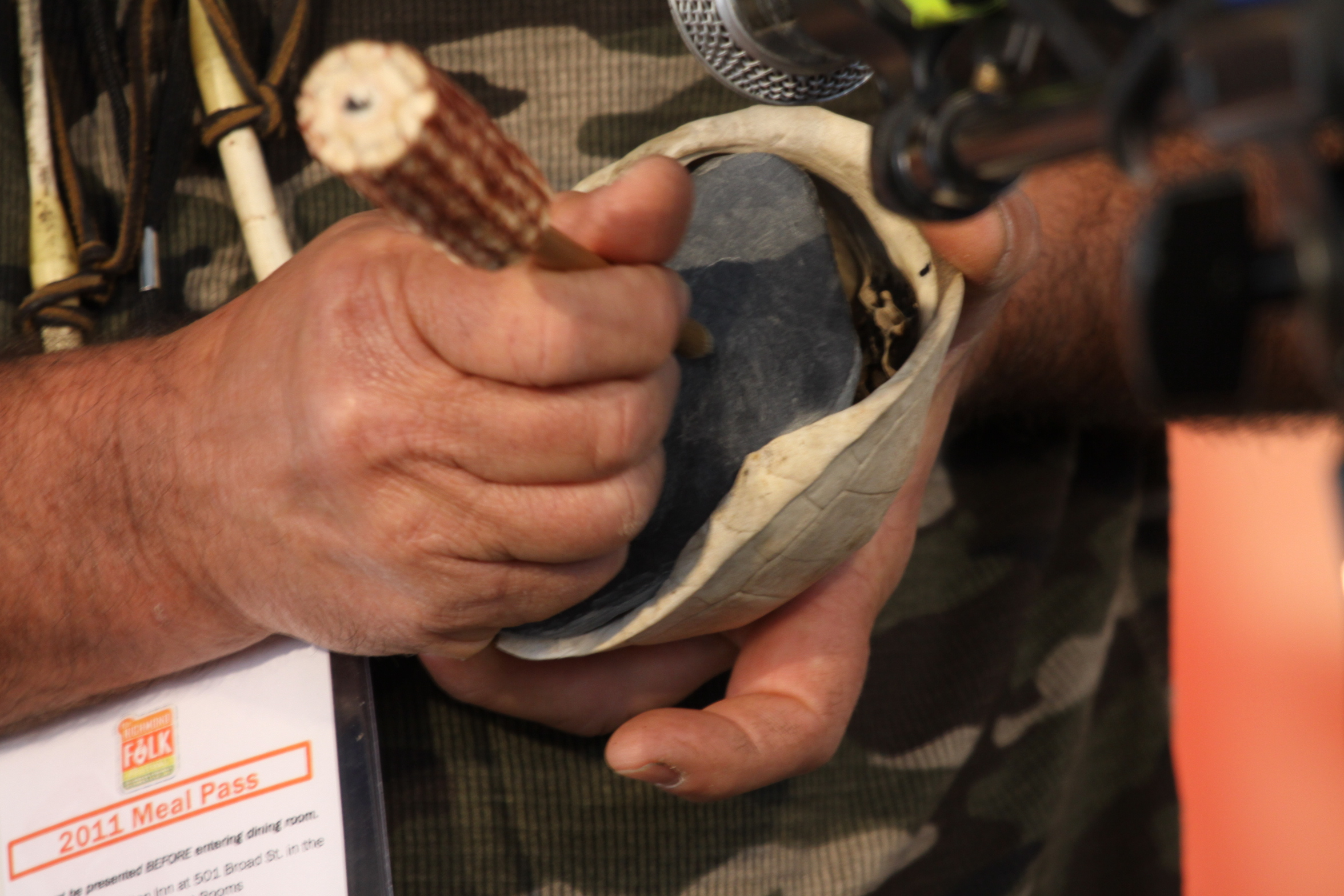
A slate pot call

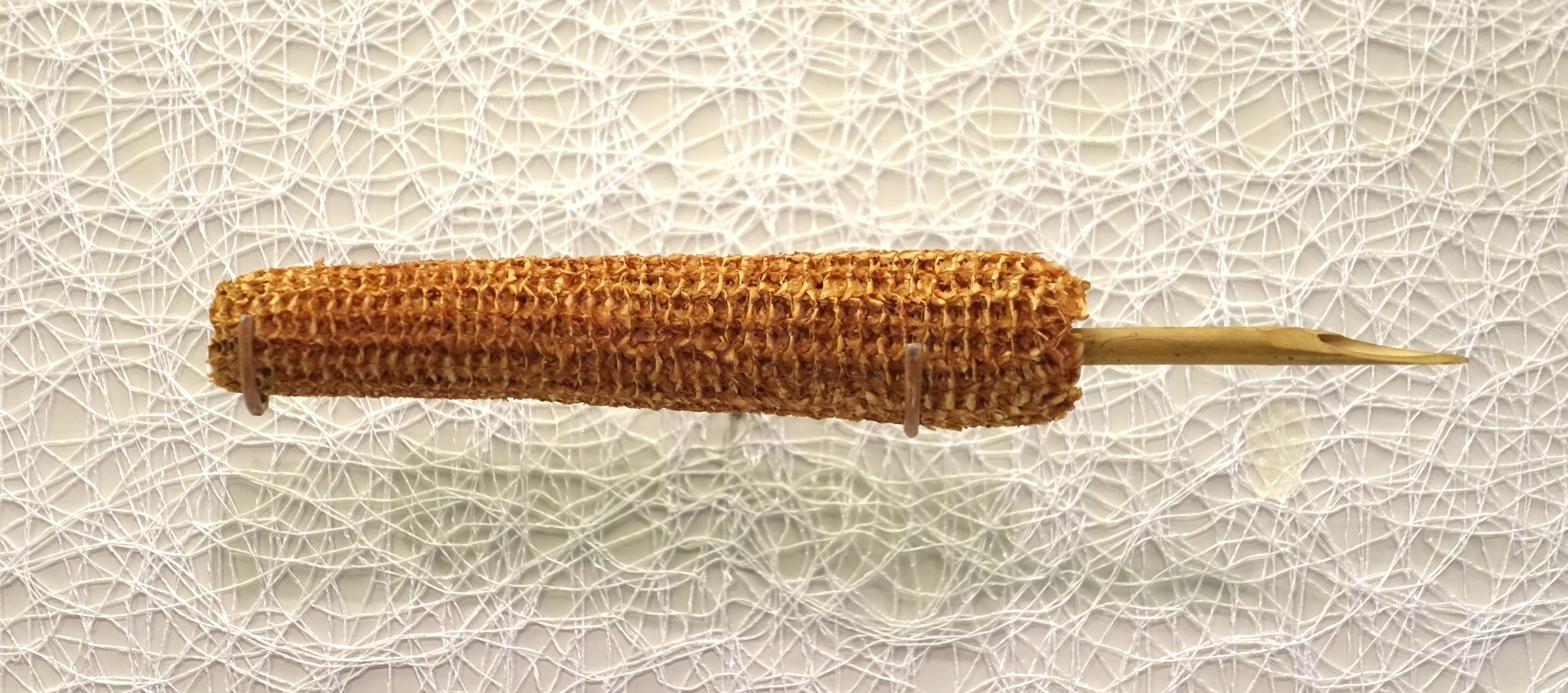
A turkey call striker

Pot calls may be the most common turkey calls because they are easy to use and create lifelike turkey sounds. Friction calls feature a round (usually) surface, and the user creates sound by drawing a peg, or "striker", across the surface. Pot call surfaces can be slate, aluminum, glass or a variety of other materials.

=== Box calls ===
Box calls create turkey sounds with the friction created by sliding the lid across the surface of the box. Box calls are convenient and are capable of producing more volume than any other call in the world.

=== Push-pull calls ===
Push-pull turkey calls are the simplest of all turkey calls to use, and create realistic turkey sounds. A push-pull call functions by pushing and/or pulling a button on the end of the call, forcing a surface across a peg.

=== Tube calls ===
The tube call is a popular caller for many of the nation's top turkey hunters. With it, a hunter can make virtually any sound in a turkey's vocabulary from yelps to purrs to gobbles. Tube calls consist of a small hollow barrel with latex fixed across half of the top with an elastic band.

=== Wingbone calls ===
Wingbone calls originally were made from the wingbones of a turkey, and some still are. They are a suction-type call. Sounds are made with quick, forceful sucking motions, much like kissing the end of the call. Good wingbone calls make a hollow sounding yelp.

=== Diaphragm calls ===
Diaphragm calls are inserted entirely in the user's mouth and require years of practice to learn to use them correctly.

=== Locator calls ===
Locators are calls used to force a tom turkey to gobble, thus giving away his location. Mature male turkeys will "shock gobble" at loud noises such as an owl's hoot, a crow's caw, a hawk's scream, a peahen's call, a rock bouncing off a stop sign, - even thunder or a train's whistle.
