= Bluegrass music =

Genre of American roots music and sub-genre of country music

Bluegrass
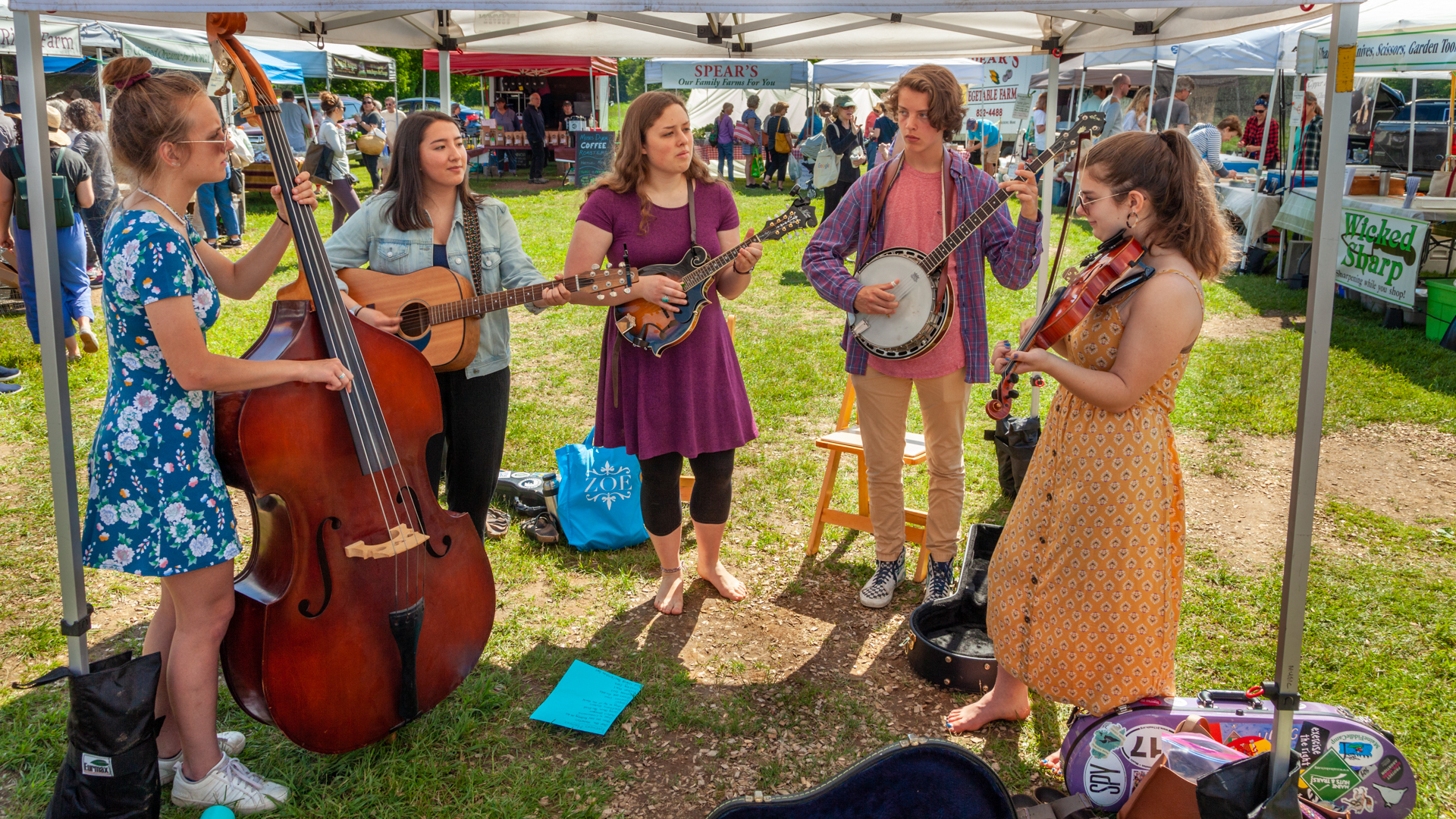
- A bluegrass band
- Stylistic origins: Country; English folk; Scottish folk; Irish folk; Appalachian music; old-time music; African-American music; string bands; blues; jazz
- Cultural origins: c. 1940s, Kentucky, Tennessee, Appalachia, Southern United States
- Typical instruments: Fiddle; banjo; acoustic guitar; washboard; mandolin; Dobro; upright bass

Subgenres
- Progressive bluegrass; traditional bluegrass

Fusion genres
- Jam band

Regional scenes
- Czech Republic - The Maritimes

Other topics
- Musicians – Hall of Honor

Bluegrass music is a genre of American roots music that developed in the 1940s in the Appalachian region of the United States. The genre derives its name from the band Bill Monroe and the Blue Grass Boys. Bluegrass has roots in African American genres like blues and jazz and North European genres, such as Irish ballads and dance tunes.

Unlike country, bluegrass is traditionally played exclusively on acoustic instruments such as the fiddle, mandolin, banjo, guitar, and upright bass. The genre was further developed by musicians who played with Monroe, including 5-string banjo player Earl Scruggs and guitarist Lester Flatt. Monroe once described bluegrass music as, "It's a part of Methodist, Holiness and Baptist traditions. It's blues and jazz, and it has a high lonesome sound."

Bluegrass features acoustic stringed instruments and emphasizes the off-beat. The off-beat can be "driven" (played close to the previous bass note) or "swung" (played farther from the previous bass note). Notes are anticipated, in contrast to laid-back blues where notes are behind the beat; this creates the higher energy characteristic of bluegrass.

In bluegrass, as in most forms of jazz, one or more instrumentalists take a turn playing the melody and improvising around it, while the others perform accompaniment; this is especially typified in tunes called breakdowns. This is in contrast to old-time music, where all instrumentalists play the melody together, or one instrument carries the lead throughout while the others provide accompaniment. Breakdowns are often characterized by rapid tempos and unusual instrumental dexterity, and sometimes by complex chord changes.

== Characteristics ==
=== Instrumentation ===
A 5-string banjo

The violin (also known as the fiddle), five-string banjo, guitar, mandolin, and upright bass (string bass) are often joined by the resonator guitar (also referred to as a Dobro) and (occasionally) harmonica or Jew's harp. This instrumentation originated in rural dance bands and is the basis on which the earliest bluegrass bands were formed.

The fiddle, made by Italians and first used in sixteenth century Europe, was one of the first instruments to be brought into America. It became popular due to its small size and versatility. Fiddles are also used in country, classical, cajun, and old time music.

Banjos were brought to America through the African slave trade. They began receiving attention from white Americans when minstrel shows incorporated the banjo as part of their acts. The "clawhammer", or two finger style playing, was popular before the Civil War. Now, however, banjo players use mainly the three-finger picking style made popular by banjoists such as Earl Scruggs. Meanwhile, a polyphonic pair of instruments playing in conversation, double banjos or twin banjos, is a bluegrass tradition upheld by artists like Tony Trischka.

Guitars are used primarily for rhythmic purposes. Other instruments may provide a solo on top of the guitar during breaks, guitarists may also provide these solos on occasion. The instrument originates from eighteenth century Spain, but there were no American-made models until the C.F. Martin Company started to manufacture them in the 1830s. The guitar is now most commonly played with a style referred to as flatpicking, unlike the style of early bluegrass guitarists such as Lester Flatt, who used a thumb pick and finger pick.

Bassists almost always play pizzicato, occasionally adopting the "slap-style" to accentuate the beat. A bluegrass bass line is generally a rhythmic alternation between the root and fifth of each chord, with occasional walking bass excursions.

Instrumentation has been a continuing topic of debate. Traditional bluegrass performers believe the "correct" instrumentation is that used by Bill Monroe's band, the Blue Grass Boys (guitar, mandolin, fiddle, banjo, and bass). Departures from the traditional instrumentation have included dobro, accordion, harmonica, piano, autoharp, drums, electric guitar, and electric versions of other common bluegrass instruments, resulting in what has been referred to as "new grass." Despite this debate, even Monroe himself was known to experiment with instrumentation; he once even used a string orchestra, choir, and pre-recorded bird-song track.

=== Vocals ===
Apart from specific instrumentation, a distinguishing characteristic of bluegrass is vocal harmony featuring two, three, or four parts, often with a dissonant or modal sound in the highest voice (see modal frame), a style described as the "high, lonesome sound". Commonly, the ordering and layering of vocal harmony is called the "stack". A standard stack has a baritone voice at the bottom, the lead in the middle (singing the main melody) and a tenor at the top, although stacks can be altered, especially where a female voice is included. Alison Krauss and Union Station provide a good example of a different harmony stack with a baritone and tenor with a high lead, an octave above the standard melody line, sung by the female vocalist. However, by employing variants to the standard trio vocal arrangement, they were simply following a pattern existing since the early days of the genre.

Both the Stanley Brothers and the Osborne Brothers employed the use of a high lead with the tenor and baritone below it. The Stanleys used this technique numerous times in their recordings for both Mercury and King records. This particular stack was most famously employed by the Osborne Brothers who first employed it during their time with MGM records in the latter half of the 1950s. This vocal arrangement would become the trademark of the Osbornes' sound with Bobby's high, clear voice at the top of the vocal stack. Additionally, the Stanley Brothers also utilized a high baritone part on several of their trios recorded for Columbia records during their time with that label (1949–1952). Mandolin player Pee Wee Lambert sang the high baritone above Ralph Stanley's tenor, both parts above Carter's lead vocal. This trio vocal arrangement was variously used by other groups as well; even Bill Monroe employed it in his 1950 recording of "When the Golden Leaves Begin to Fall". In the 1960s, Flatt and Scruggs often added a fifth part to the traditional quartet parts on gospel songs, the extra part being a high baritone (doubling the baritone part sung in the normal range of that voice; E.P. Tullock [aka Cousin Jake] normally providing the part, though at times it was handled by Curly Seckler).

=== Themes ===
Bluegrass tunes often take the form of narratives on the everyday lives of the people whence the music came. Aside from laments about loves lost, interpersonal tensions and unwanted changes to the region (e.g., the visible effects of mountaintop coal mining), bluegrass vocals frequently reference the hardscrabble existence of living in Appalachia and other rural areas with modest financial resources. Some protest music has been composed in the bluegrass style, especially concerning the vicissitudes of the Appalachian coal mining industry. Railroading has also been a popular theme, with ballads such as "Wreck of the Old 97" and "Nine Pound Hammer" (from the legend of John Henry).

== History ==
David Grisman, Chris Thile and Enrique Coria at the Grey Fox Bluegrass Festival in 1998

=== Creation ===
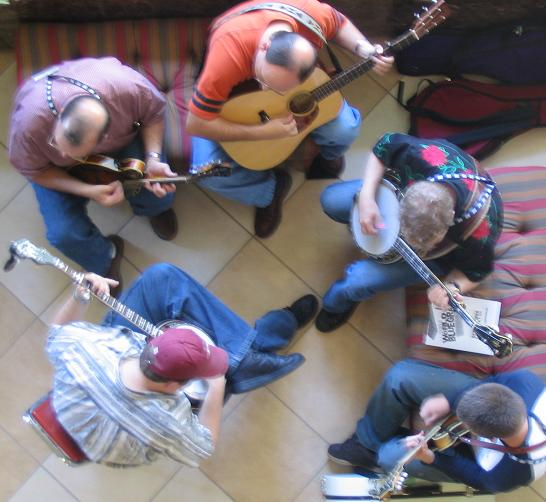
Bluegrass artists use a variety of stringed instruments.

Bluegrass as a distinct musical form developed from elements of old-time music and traditional music in the Appalachian region of the United States. The Appalachian region was where many Scottish American immigrants settled, bringing with them the musical traditions of their homelands. Hence the sounds of jigs and reels, especially as played on the fiddle, were innate to the developing style. Black musicians, meanwhile, brought the iconic banjo to Appalachia. Much later, in 1945, Earl Scruggs would develop a three-finger roll on the instrument which allowed a rapid-fire cascade of notes that could keep up with the driving tempo of the new bluegrass sound.

Settlers from Britain and Ireland arrived in Appalachia during the 18th century and brought with them the musical traditions of their homelands. These traditions consisted primarily of English and Scottish ballads—which were essentially unaccompanied narrative—and dance music, such as reels, which were accompanied by a fiddle. Many older bluegrass songs come directly from the British Isles. Several Appalachian bluegrass ballads, such as "Pretty Saro", "Pretty Polly", "Cuckoo Bird", and "House Carpenter", come from England and preserve the English ballad tradition both melodically and lyrically. Some bluegrass fiddle songs popular in Appalachia, such as "Leather Britches" and "Soldier's Joy", have Scottish roots. The dance tune "Cumberland Gap" may be derived from the tune that accompanies the Scottish ballad "Bonnie George Campbell".

The music now known as bluegrass was frequently used to accompany a rural dancing style known as buckdancing, flatfooting, or clogging. As the bluegrass sound spread to urban areas, listening to it for its own sake increased, especially after the advent of sound recording. In 1948, what would come to be known as bluegrass emerged as a genre within the post-war country/western-music industry, a period of time characterized now as the golden era or wellspring of "traditional bluegrass". From its earliest days, bluegrass has been recorded and performed by professional and amateur musicians alike. Although amateur bluegrass musicians and trends such as "parking-lot picking" are too important to be ignored, it is touring musicians who have set the direction of the style. Radio stations dedicated to bluegrass have also proved influential in advancing the evolution of the style into distinctive subgenres.

=== Classification ===
Bluegrass was initially included in the category of folk music and later changed to hillbilly. In 1948, bluegrass was placed under the country and western heading for radio airplay charting. All four of the seminal bluegrass authors – Artis, Price, Cantwell, and Rosenberg – described bluegrass music in detail as originating in style and form, in one form or another, between the 1930s and mid-1940s. However, the term "bluegrass" did not appear formally to describe the music until the late 1950s and did not appear in Music Index until 1965. The first entry in Music Index mentioning "bluegrass music" directed the reader to "see Country Music; Hillbilly Music". Music Index maintained this listing for bluegrass music until 1986. The first time bluegrass music had its own entries in Music Index was in 1987.

The topical and narrative themes of many bluegrass songs are highly reminiscent of folk music. Many songs that are widely considered to be bluegrass are in reality older works legitimately classified as folk or old-time music that are performed in the bluegrass style. The interplay between bluegrass and folk forms has been academically studied. Folklorist Neil Rosenberg, for example, shows that most devoted bluegrass fans and musicians are familiar with traditional folk songs and old-time music and that these songs are often played at shows, festivals, and jams.

=== Origin of name ===
"Bluegrass" is a common name given in America for the grass of the Poa genus, the most famous being Kentucky bluegrass. A large region in central Kentucky is sometimes called the Bluegrass region (although this region is west of the hills of Kentucky). Exactly when the word "bluegrass" was adopted is not certain, but is believed to be in the late 1950s. It was derived from the name of the seminal Blue Grass Boys band, formed in 1939 with Bill Monroe as its leader. Due to this lineage, Bill Monroe is frequently referred to as the "father of bluegrass".

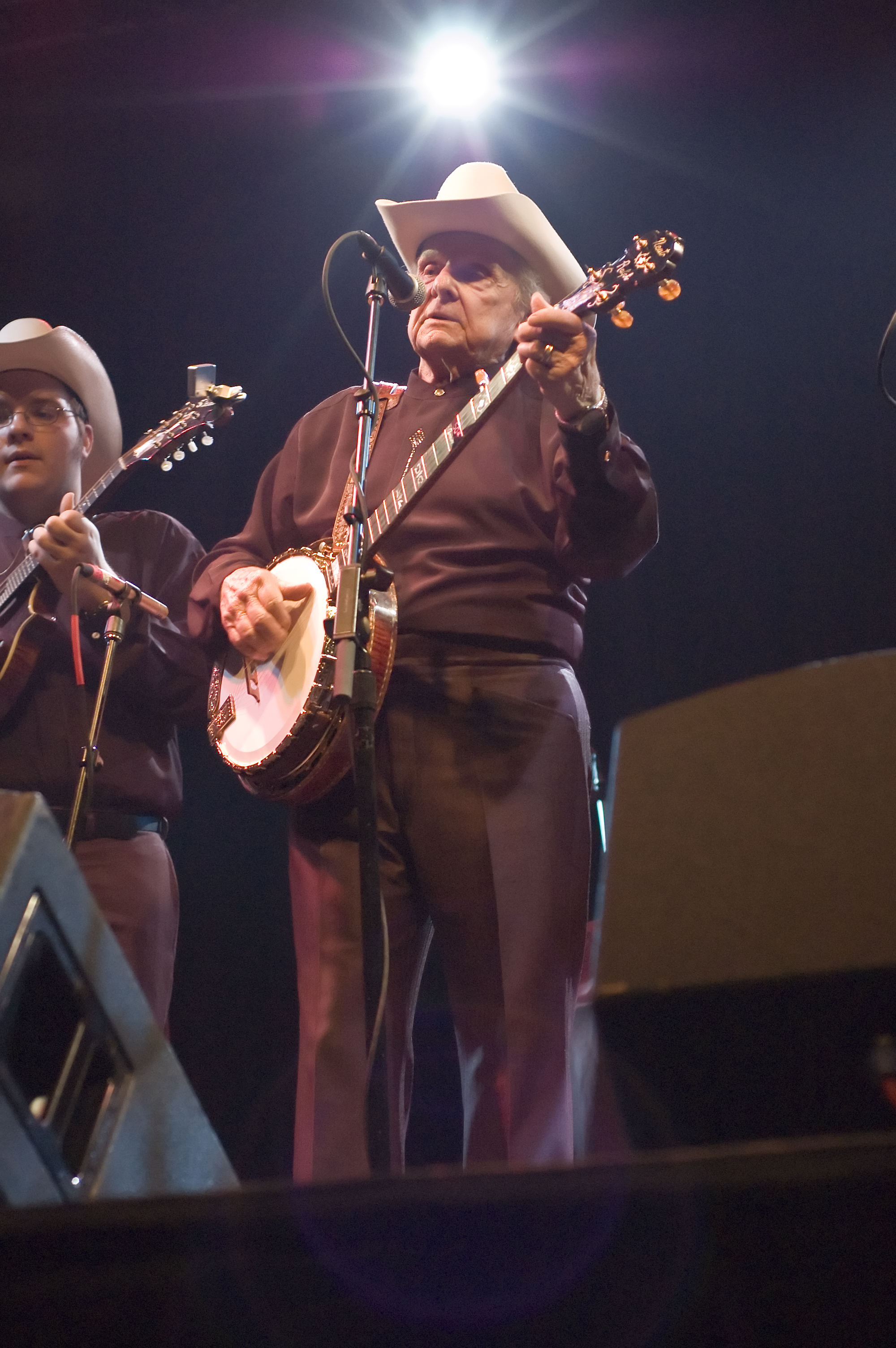
Ralph Stanley on April 20, 2008, in Dallas, Texas

The bluegrass style of music dates from the mid-1940s. In 1948, the Stanley Brothers recorded the traditional song "Molly and Tenbrooks" in the Blue Grass Boys' style, arguably the point in time that bluegrass emerged as a distinct musical form. Monroe's 1946 to 1948 band, which featured guitarist Lester Flatt, banjoist Earl Scruggs, fiddler Chubby Wise and bassist Howard Watts (also known as "Cedric Rainwater") – sometimes called "the original bluegrass band" – created the definitive sound and instrumental configuration that remains a model to this day. By some arguments, while the Blue Grass Boys were the only band playing this music, it was just their unique sound; it could not be considered a musical style until other bands began performing in a similar fashion. In 1967, the banjo instrumental "Foggy Mountain Breakdown" by Flatt and Scruggs was introduced to a worldwide audience as a result of its frequent use in the movie "Bonnie and Clyde". But the functionally similar old-time music genre was long-established and widely recorded in the period of the film's events and later CD was released.

Ralph Stanley commented about the origins of the genre and its name.

Oh, (Monroe) was the first. But it wasn't called bluegrass back then. It was just called old-time mountain hillbilly music. When they started doing the bluegrass festivals in 1965, everybody got together and wanted to know what to call the show, y'know. It was decided that since Bill was the oldest man, and was from the bluegrass state of Kentucky and he had the Blue Grass Boys, it would be called 'bluegrass.'

== Subgenres and recent developments ==
=== Traditional bluegrass ===
Traditional bluegrass emphasizes the traditional elements and form of the genre, as laid out by Bill Monroe and his Blue Grass Boys band in the late 1940s. Traditional bluegrass musicians play folk songs, tunes with simple traditional chord progressions, exclusively on acoustic instruments, although it is common practice to amplify acoustic instruments during stage performances before larger audiences. In most traditional bluegrass bands, the guitar rarely takes the lead, instead acting as a rhythm instrument, one notable exception being gospel-based songs. Melodies and lyrics tend to be simple, often in the key of G, and a I-IV-V chord pattern is common. In traditional bluegrass, instrumental breaks are typically short and played between sections of a song, conventionally originating as a variation on the song's melody. Also common are breakdowns, an instrumental form that features a series of breaks, each played by a different instrument. Particularly since the 1990s, a number of younger groups have attempted to revive the sound and structure of traditional bluegrass, a trend that has been dubbed neo-traditional bluegrass.

=== Progressive bluegrass ===
The group the Country Gentlemen is credited with starting the progressive bluegrass movement with their 1960 album Country Songs, Old and New, combining traditional ballads such as "The Little Sparrow", "Weeping Willow" and "Ellen Smith" with traditional bluegrass instrumentation and "bouncy" mandolin and banjo parts distinct from those of traditional players such as Monroe and Scruggs.

Due to the exposure traditional bluegrass received alongside mainstream country music on radio and televised programs such as the Grand Ole Opry, a wave of young and not exclusively Southern musicians began replicating the genre's format on college campuses and in coffeehouses amidst the American folk music revival of the early 1960s. These artists often incorporated songs, elements and instruments from other popular genres, particularly rock and roll. Banjoist Earl Scruggs of Flatt and Scruggs had shown progressive tendencies since the group's earliest days, incorporating jazz-inspired banjo and bass duets and complex chord progressions that extended the genre's original rigid, conservative structure. In the late 1960s, Scruggs experimented on duets with saxophonist King Curtis and added songs by the likes of counterculture icon Bob Dylan to the group's repertoire, while bandmate Lester Flatt, a traditionalist, opposed these changes, resulting in the group's breakup in 1969.

New Grass Revival began utilizing electric instrumentation alongside songs imported from other genres to great popularity in the 1970s and 1980s, and the term "newgrass" became synonymous with "progressive bluegrass". It continued to evolve though the '80s and '90s, moving closer to folk and rock in some quarters and closer to jazz in others, while festivals such as the Telluride Bluegrass Festival, RockyGrass in Lyons, Colorado, and MerleFest in Wilkesboro, North Carolina began to attract acts from outside the bluegrass tradition, merging the bluegrass community with other popular music scenes across America.

Following the death of Jerry Garcia, who began his career playing bluegrass, and the dissolution of the Grateful Dead, the blossoming "jam band" scene that followed in their wake embraced and included many groups that performed progressive bluegrass styles that included extended, exploratory musical improvisation, often called "jamgrass". This style began to define many such acts whose popularity has grown into the 21st century, such as Leftover Salmon, the String Cheese Incident, Yonder Mountain String Band, the Infamous Stringdusters, Railroad Earth, Greensky Bluegrass and Billy Strings. In recent years, groups like the Punch Brothers, the Jon Stickley Trio and Nickel Creek have developed a new form of progressive bluegrass which includes highly arranged pieces resembling contemporary classical music played on bluegrass instruments. These bands feature complicated rhythms, chord schemes, and harmonics combined with improvised solos. At the same time, several popular indie folk and folk rock bands such as the Avett Brothers, Mumford & Sons and Trampled by Turtles have incorporated rhythmic elements and instrumentation from the bluegrass tradition into their popular music arrangements, as has the Branson-based band the Petersens.

=== International bluegrass ===
While originating in the United States, Bluegrass as a genre has expanded beyond the borders of the United States and become an internationally appreciated art form. Bluegrass associations now exist worldwide. One such association, the International Bluegrass Music Association (IBMA), was formed in 1985 and presents annual awards. In 2012, the critically acclaimed Dutch-language Belgian film, The Broken Circle Breakdown, featured Flemish musicians performing bluegrass music central to the story.

International bluegrass groups include Hayde Bluegrass Orchestra and Ila Auto from Norway; Rautakoura and Steve 'n' Seagulls from Finland; Druhá Tráva and Poutníci from the Czech Republic (home of the subgenre, Czech bluegrass); Hutong Yellow Weasels and The Randy Abel Stable from China; Heartbreak Hill and Foggy Hogtown Boys from Canada; the U.K.'s The Beef Seeds, Southern Tenant Folk Union, and Police Dog Hogan; and Australia's Flying Emus, Mustered Courage, and Rank Strangers.

== See also ==
- Bluegrass music in Europe
