= Bluegrass music in Europe =

== History and Transatlantic Origins ==
Henry Ossawa Tanner's The Banjo Lesson (1893) depicts an African-American elder teaching a youth the 5-string banjo. The instrument's West African and African-American heritage became foundational to the development of bluegrass, which later spread globally across Europe. Collection of the Hampton University Museum, Hampton, Virginia USA

The roots of bluegrass music in Europe exist as a cyclical, transatlantic musical migration. Throughout the 18th and 19th centuries, a steady influx of European immigrants—most notably over 250,000 Ulster Scots (Scots-Irish) and Scottish settlers arriving between 1717 and 1775, alongside large waves of German-speaking immigrants settling across Pennsylvania and southward through the Shenandoah Valley into the Appalachian region—crossed the Atlantic Ocean. While Anglo-Celtic communities brought maritime ballads, regional dance tunes, and the fiddle, German settlers contributed four-part sacred choral traditions, secular folk melodies, and traditional stringed instruments such as the scheitholt—a fretted drone zither that evolved in the late 18th century into the Appalachian dulcimer. German craftsmanship also directly shaped the instrumentation of modern bluegrass: in 1833, Saxon-born luthier Christian Frederick Martin emigrated to the United States, eventually establishing C. F. Martin & Company in Nazareth, Pennsylvania, where his development of X-bracing and the large-bodied dreadnought acoustic guitar provided the rhythmic and tonal backbone of bluegrass ensembles.

Once established in the American South, these European musical traditions underwent a profound cross-cultural transformation as they converged with African-American rhythmic structures and musical forms. Central to this exchange was the banjo, an instrument that evolved from West African lute antecedents fashioned by the African diaspora in the 17th and 18th centuries. Through 19th-century adaptations, the instrument was modified into the modern five-string banjo, characterised by a shorter, thumb-plucked fifth drone string that gave it a distinct, driving acoustic syncopation. This synthesis of African-American blues scales, driving rhythms, and Northern and Central European vocal and instrumental traditions laid the groundwork for "old-time" string band music.

The final European instrumental link arrived in the late 19th century, when waves of Italian immigration and touring ensembles popularised the Neapolitan bowl-back mandolin across North America. American instrument makers subsequently re-engineered the European design for greater volume and projection: Orville Gibson introduced violin-style carved tops and backs in the 1890s, and Gibson acoustic engineer Lloyd Loar refined the flat-back, f-hole Gibson F-5 in the early 1920s.

This transatlantic convergence reached its definitive commercial form in the mid-1940s under Kentucky mandolinist Bill Monroe and his band, the Blue Grass Boys, from whom the genre ultimately took its name. Monroe's rapid, percussive playing on a 1923 Lloyd Loar Gibson F-5, paired with the steady rhythm guitar of Lester Flatt, the syncopated three-finger banjo roll of Earl Scruggs, and the blues-inflected fiddle of Chubby Wise, established an acoustic blueprint that Monroe described as a blend of blues, jazz, and traditional church spirituals anchored by a "high lonesome sound". Having reshaped American roots music, this style eventually made a return journey across the Atlantic, finding an enduring home within European folk and acoustic circuits.

== Belgium ==
Belgium maintains an active, grassroots bluegrass community, though its infrastructure is smaller and less formalised than the established festival and instructional circuits in the United Kingdom, France, or the Czech Republic. Rather than supporting large commercial touring circuits, the Belgian scene is anchored by regional annual gatherings, recurring urban jam sessions, and small-scale workshops.

Ghent hosts regular acoustic and bluegrass jam sessions, alongside other major Belgian cities.

Annual festivals in the country include the Aarschots Folk & Bluegrass Festival, held each June in Aarschot in collaboration with the cultural centre CC Het Gasthuis, which showcases Belgian and international acoustic acts alongside instructional workshops. In Mol, the non-profit Flying Caravan Bluegrass Festival operates as a multi-day camping event centred on open jamming and community participation. Outside of seasonal festivals, regular acoustic sessions in cities such as Antwerp, Ghent, and Brussels serve as the primary meeting points for local musicians.

Unlike countries that host large week-long residential music camps—such as the United Kingdom's Sore Fingers Summer Schools—Belgium does not have a permanent national bluegrass summer school. Domestic tuition generally consists of single-day festival workshops or short multi-day retreats led by prominent local instrumentalists, such as five-string banjo player Steve Louvat in Libin, Belgium. Consequently, Belgian musicians frequently travel to neighbouring countries for extended residential instruction, attending camps and workshops in France (such as Bluegrass in La Roche), the Netherlands, and the United Kingdom.

== Czech Republic ==
As early as the 19th century, people in what is now the Czech Republic were fascinated with the American Wild West. This was part of a movement called tramping in which people would enjoy hiking, craftsmanship, and playing American music. In the 1950's, Czech people would listen to country and bluegrass music from American military radio. It wouldn't be until the 1960's until bluegrass began to take hold in then Czechoslovakia. In 1964, Pete Seeger held a series of concerts in the country that would introduce its people to the 5-string banjo for the first time. The first bluegrass festival in Europe, Banjo Jamboree was held at Čáslav in 1972. At this time, Czechoslovakia was under Soviet influence. All of the bands in the country at the time were forbidden from singing their songs in English. So, the Czech bluegrass bands would rewrite the songs in Czech. After the success of the Velvet Revolution in 1989, communist rule was over and western influence poured in. Bluegrass' popularity ballooned to one of the nations biggest genres.

Some of the biggest acts in the Czech bluegrass scene are Druhá Tráva, The Malina Brothers, and Greenhorns. Druhá Tráva was even selected to play for President Obama at Prague Castle in 2011. Popular bluegrass festivals include the aforementioned Banjo Jamboree and Kosodrevina, which takes place atop a Slovak mountain.

== Denmark ==
A live acoustic performance on stage at the Tønder Festival in Denmark.

Bluegrass music in Denmark has a history rooted in the broader Nordic acoustic folk scene, dating back to the early 1980s. The community is centrally coordinated by the national association, Bluegrass Music Denmark (the Danish Bluegrass Music Association), which organizes regular workshops, instructional jam sessions, and local concert series. These events are frequently hosted at municipal cultural hubs such as the Karens Minde Kulturhus in Copenhagen. Danish bluegrass musicians and fans have traditionally integrated into the long-running Tønder Festival, a major international focal point that regularly features prominent American and European bluegrass, old-time, and roots string bands.

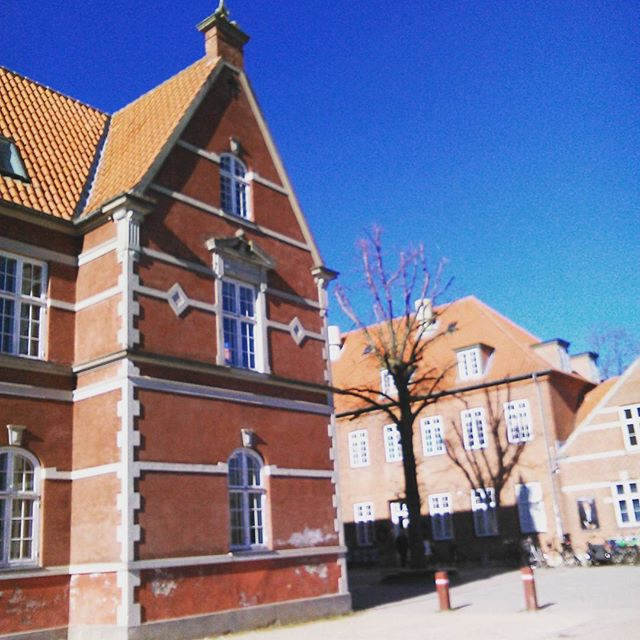
The Karens Minde Kulturhus complex in Copenhagen, a central hub for Bluegrass Music Denmark gatherings.

The domestic circuit has increasingly expanded to feature standalone roots events, including the open-air Coalhouse Bluegrass Festival established on the fjord in Kulhuse, Frederikssund. This development has been supported by local municipal initiatives aimed at establishing dedicated instructional camps and masterclasses to connect professional touring acts with local acoustic musicians.

== France ==
France has a well-established bluegrass community dating back to the 1960s, driven by early acoustic music pioneers and the establishment of the France Bluegrass Music Association (FBMA). The scene reached its early height in the 1980s with the Toulouse Bluegrass Festivals (1982–1984), which brought together major American and European performers and set performance standards for a new generation of French musicians.

France hosts one of the premier events in the global bluegrass calendar:

- La Roche Bluegrass Festival: Held annually since 2006 in the alpine village of La Roche-sur-Foron, Haute-Savoie, it is widely recognised as the largest dedicated bluegrass festival in Europe, drawing thousands of visitors and hosting dozens of international bands alongside extensive luthier exhibitions and instructional workshops.

== Germany ==
Germany has an active bluegrass and acoustic roots scene supported by the German Bluegrass Music Association (GBMA), founded in 2010.

=== Festivals ===
- Internationales Bühler Bluegrass Festival: Held annually in Bühl, Baden-Württemberg, since 2003, the festival was established as a successor to the Güglingen Bluegrass Festival (1986–2001). It features international lineups from North America and Europe alongside open-air performances in the town centre.
- GrevenGrass Bluegrass Festival: Organised annually in May by the non-profit association GrevenGrass e.V. (founded in 2008) in Greven, North Rhine-Westphalia, inheriting the tradition of the earlier Neusüdende festival.
- Munich Bluegrass Festival: An annual regional festival held in Munich, Bavaria.

=== Educational camps and workshops ===
- Adiaha's Bluegrass Camp: Held at the Bildungshaus Achatswies in Fischbachau, Bavaria, this multi-day residential camp focuses on traditional acoustic bluegrass instruction across banjo, mandolin, guitar, fiddle, dobro, upright bass, and harmony vocals, alongside coached scratch bands and guided jam sessions.
- Acoustic Roots Camps: The Acoustic Roots organisation hosts an annual four-day summer camp in Loshausen (Hesse) featuring workshops and jam sessions, as well as JAMuary, an annual winter camp in Hofgeismar dedicated to bluegrass and old-time music.
- Acoustic Music School: Located in Schönau, Rhineland-Palatinate, the school runs structured weekend ensemble and band workshops focusing on bluegrass repertoire and group performance.

== Ireland ==
Irish traditional music influenced the development of Appalachian folk and mountain music, which later evolved into bluegrass music. Scottish and Irish immigrants introduced instruments, including the fiddle, and traditional Celtic styles, tunes, and songs to the Appalachian region. Ireland's largest bluegrass festival is the Westport Folk & Bluegrass Festival, established in 2007 by Israeli-born organiser Uri Kohen who had previously worked as a sound technician. The annual event is held in Westport, County Mayo at local venues in early June. Concerts take place in the town with jam sessions at public houses and hotels. In June 2024, the festival facilitated an academic collaboration between three traditional and roots music education programs: the Irish World Academy of Music and Dance at the University of Limerick, the Bluegrass, Old Time, and Roots Music Program at East Tennessee State University, and the Centre for Popular Music at Middle Tennessee State University.

== Italy ==
Italy holds a distinctive connection to bluegrass through the mandolin, which originated in Italy before being adapted by American luthiers into the carved-top instrument used in bluegrass ensembles. In the modern era, Italy has developed an active bluegrass community supported by regional associations, touring ensembles, and international festivals.

== Netherlands ==
Bluegrass music started becoming more known in the Netherlands during the folk music revival in the 1960s, with The Dutch Bluegrass Boys being the first band to record bluegrass music in the Netherlands in 1969.

In 1983, the Dutch bluegrass band Jerrycan received critical acclaim from Les McIntyre in the American bluegrass magazine Bluegrass Unlimited, stating: "Their debut album "Stony Man Mountain," is a showcase for some of the most superlative bluegrass on either side of the Atlantic Ocean". Their lead singer Theo Lissenberg went on to play with 4 Wheel Drive, a 5-piece Dutch bluegrass band that became the first to play at the International Bluegrass Music Awards in 2002.

The Dutch singer Bertolf released a bluegrass album in 2023 called "Bluefinger", recorded with renowned American bluegrass artists such as Jerry Douglas, Stuart Duncan and Mark Schatz.

There is a variety of annual bluegrass festivals and gatherings that happen in the Netherlands. European World of Bluegrass in the small town of Voorthuizen is an annual festival that was first organized by Paolo Dettwiler from Switzerland in 1998. At this festival the most important part of the event is the campsite, where people meet and jam. After the 2017 edition, the festival almost ended due to redevelopment plans the local municipality had for the festival site. The organization managed to negotiate a substitute location with the local municipality and returned in 2022.

The Rotterdam Bluegrass Festival in the historic port city of Rotterdam started as a small gathering with 250 visitors in 2009 and, after a 2 year break, grew into a large annual festival celebrating its tenth edition in 2022 with over 10.000 people attending.

== Spain ==
Bluegrass in Spain has grown steadily through regional acoustic festivals, workshops, and local bands, supported by national and European bluegrass organisations.

== Sweden ==
Sweden possesses an active and enduring bluegrass scene that emerged out of the broader European acoustic folk boom of the 1970s. The country is notable for hosting some of the longest-running continuous bluegrass gatherings on the continent, heavily supported by regional picking circles and folk networks.

Prominent Swedish bluegrass festivals include:

- Gränna Bluegrass Festival: Established in 1978 in Gränna, Jönköping County, this event is one of Europe's oldest continuous bluegrass festivals, traditionally held on the third weekend of August along the shores of Lake Vättern.
- Torsåker Bluegrass Festival: Held annually during the first weekend of July in Torsåker, Gävleborg County, serving as a central hub for Nordic string bands, instrument workshops, and camping jams.
- Nääsville Bluegrass Festival: A prominent annual mid-summer gathering showcasing domestic and touring international American roots acts.

== United Kingdom ==
Bluegrass began developing a dedicated following in England during the late 1950s skiffle boom and expanded alongside the broader British folk revival of the 1960s and 1970s. Because the genre drew heavily upon British and Irish balladry and dance tune traditions, its acoustic instrumentation and vocal harmonies proved readily accessible to British folk audiences.

In 1963, American bluegrass musician Bill Clifton relocated to Kent, becoming a central figure in establishing the genre in the United Kingdom. Clifton headlined the first major European bluegrass concert at London's Royal Albert Hall, drawing a sell-out audience of 7,000 alongside his backing group, the Echo Mountain Boys—an ensemble of young musicians from Sevenoaks, Kent, that included the Townend Brothers and Robert Winquest. He also promoted the genre nationwide by producing and presenting bluegrass programming for the BBC.

On 11 March 1966, the Stanley Brothers made their sole UK appearance at the Royal Albert Hall as part of the touring Festival of American Folk and Country Music, an 18-date European showcase spanning England, Germany, Switzerland, Sweden, and Denmark. According to retrospective accounts published in Bluegrass Today, the London performance served as a watershed moment for early British bluegrass musicians and fans in attendance.

=== Bluegrass festivals and summer schools ===
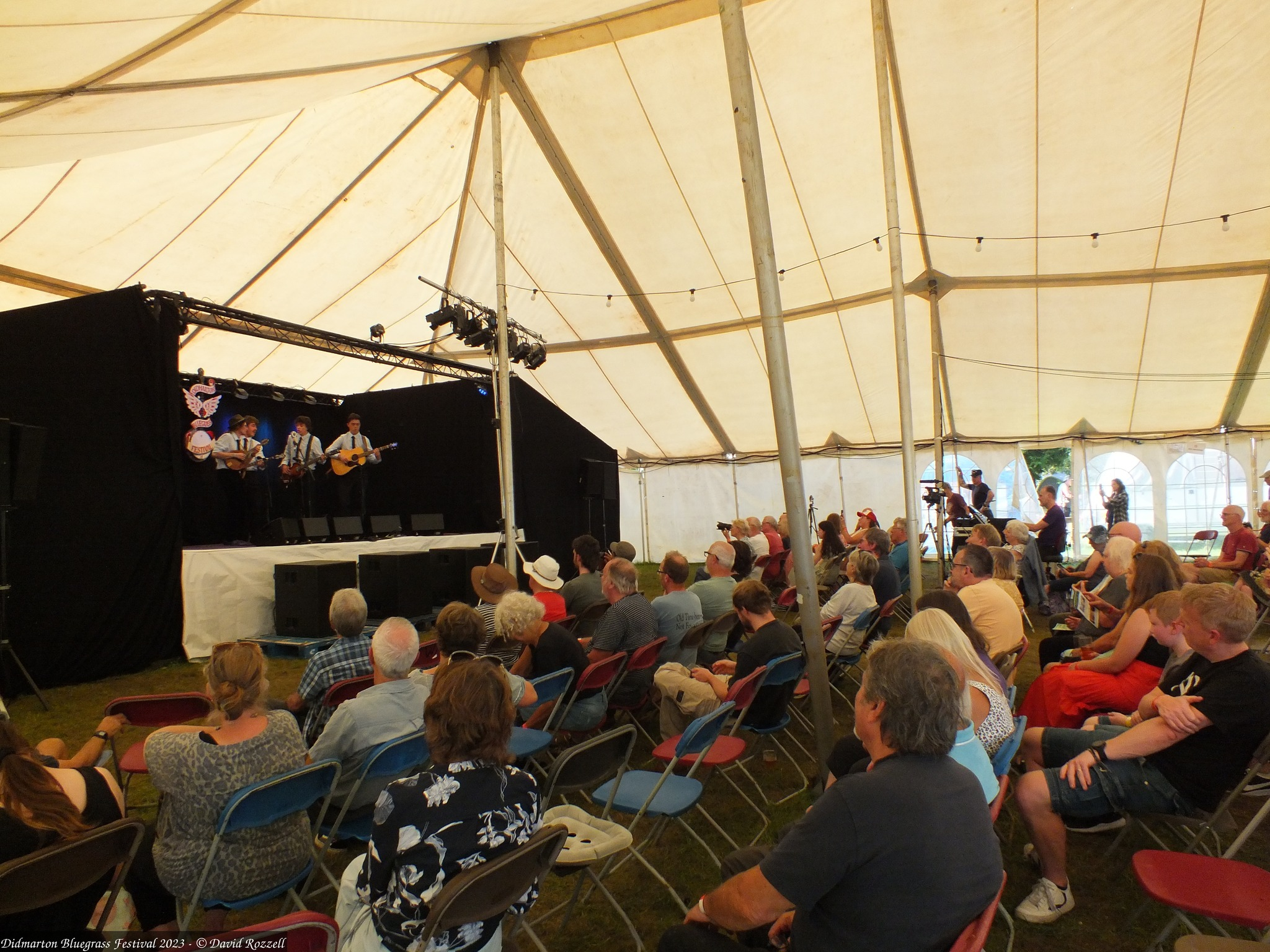
The Boatswain Brothers play Didmarton mainstage 2023

In 1976 the Edale Bluegrass Festival was founded. It was originally created by bluegrass enthusiast Steve Reed, who organised the inaugural event at Edale Village Hall in September after distributing flyers at the Cambridge Folk Festival. The following year, the festival was moved to June and achieved national prominence under the primary management and expansion of musician Tom Travis. This was the first large scale bluegrass festival in the UK and hosted performances by Alison Krauss and Ralph Stanley and the Clinch Mountain Boys. (Note: While mainstream music histories, such as Neil Rosenberg's Bluegrass: A History, credit musician Tom Travis with establishing the Edale Bluegrass Festival as a major national fixture, community accounts and oral histories within the British Bluegrass Music Association (BBMA) frequently credit enthusiast Steve Reed (variously spelled "Steve Read", however, the correct spelling is "Reed") with organising the initial 1976 gathering at Edale Village Hall, Derbyshire, before Travis took over its primary expansion and management in 1977.) That same year, Tony Rice (1951-2020) played the Cambridge folk festival with the Grisman Quintet. 1988 saw the start of the Didmarton bluegrass festival which continues to this day at Kemble Airfield Enterprise Park, Gloucestershire.

Emily Smith and Andy Quelch - SoreFingers Halloween Tutor Concert, Nadine Uppal Theatre, Lord Wandsworth College, 24 October 2026

Acorn Gates, Lord Wandsworth College, Hampshire, 6 April 2026 RG29 1TB

In the United Kingdom, bluegrass music education was significantly expanded with the establishment of Sore Fingers Summer Schools (SFSS).

The organisation was founded in 1996 by Andrea Waters and John Wirtz, with additional assistance from Mike Preston during its first two years. Waters conceived the idea after attending the Augusta Heritage Camps in the United States. Following a visit to Kingham Hill School in The Cotswolds, the site was selected as the venue for the inaugural residential camp. The initial event hosted 50 students across three instructional courses. Management of the schools transitioned in 2003, when John and Moira Wirtz became the sole owner-managers. Later, in June 2021, Sore Fingers Summer Schools became a Limited Company.

In late 2025, the organisation relocated its event venue to Lord Wandsworth College in Long Sutton, Hampshire. (Note: The southern entrance road to Lord Wandsworth College, Hampshire, features the historic "Acorn Gates" (South Gates), which were originally designed by architect Sir Guy Dawber around 1926 and have since seen structural restorations to maintain their pristine appearance.)

Over the following three decades, the organisation expanded into a residential training camp for bluegrass and old-time traditional music in Europe. Its annual April school accommodates more than 250 students, and is followed by a weekend workshop in October. The programme serves as a hub for transatlantic musical exchange, hosting instructors from the United States and the British roots scene. Notable musicians who have taught at the school include Pete Wernick, Tony Trischka, Mike Compton (musician), Becky Buller, Lynn Morris (musician) (Note: Lynn Morris taught banjo at Sore Fingers in 1997 and again the following year. In 2003 she suffered a stroke which occurred three days after knee replacement surgery. That same year she retired from touring and disbanded the Lynn Morris Band. Morris made a rare comeback appearance at the Shenandoah Apple Blossom Bluegrass Festival in May 2011. In 2021, she was inducted into the Bluegrass Music Hall of Fame. Her album: Mama's Hand came out in 1995 and contains the track It Rains Everywhere I Go.) and Jody Stecher.

The camp's intensive instruction and structured jam sessions are credited with developing instrument proficiency and fostering regional bluegrass networks across the United Kingdom and continental Europe. According to a British Broadcasting Corporation (BBC) programme overview, Sore Fingers has established itself as "a fixture on the international bluegrass calendar," drawing world-class instructional talent.

Instruction covers a wide range of traditional instruments, including banjo, fiddle, mandolin, guitar, dobro, autoharp, and bass, alongside dedicated classes for singing and songwriting. The curriculum regularly expands to introduce new instrumental electives depending on student demand, such as the introduction of an old-time guitar class.

=== Orkney, Scotland ===
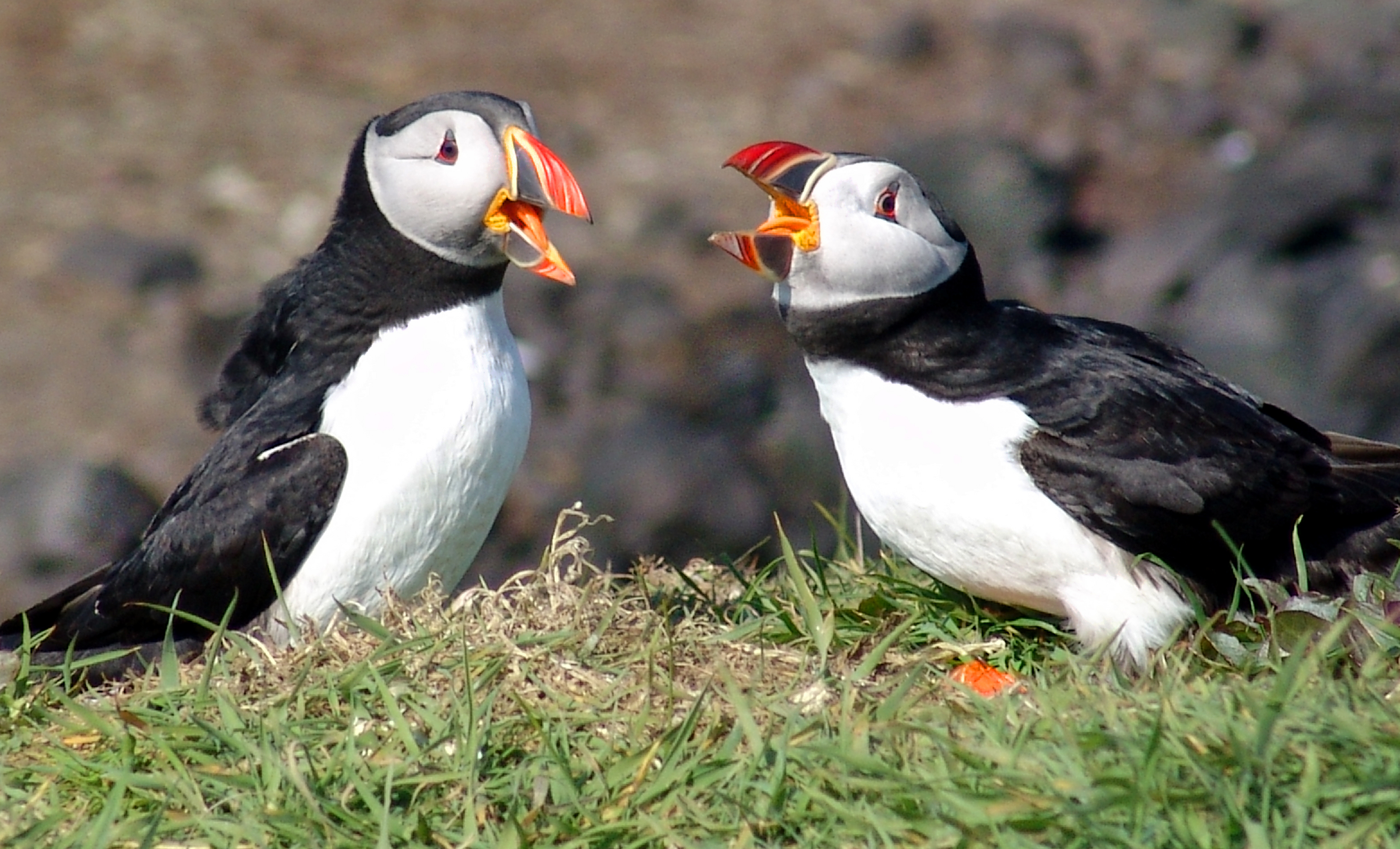
Atlantic puffins nesting along the rugged coastal cliffs of the islands.

Established in 2024 by the Water Sound Festival Committee and the Burray Community Association, the Water Sound Bluegrass and Roots Festival is held annually in the Orkney Islands, Scotland. Characterised as the United Kingdom's most northerly celebration of bluegrass and Americana music, the festival was founded to connect international touring virtuosos with the islands' vibrant local traditional music community. The event showcases an expansive stylistic repertoire, incorporating traditional bluegrass, old-time, Americana, country, blues, and western swing.

The coastal Iron Age settlement at the Broch of Gurness, one of Orkney's historic landmarks.

The festival benefits from historical and structural continuity with the long-established Orkney Folk Festival—an event that has introduced acoustic roots and transatlantic traditional music to the archipelago since 1983. While the Orkney Folk Festival focuses heavily on Celtic, Nordic, and contemporary folk traditions in late spring, the Water Sound Festival functions as a complementary summer counterpart. This intersection highlights the deep historical links between Scottish traditional fiddle playing and Appalachian old-time and bluegrass traditions, allowing touring transatlantic artists who cross over into the wider British folk festival network to engage specifically with Orcadian audiences.

The festival is centred in Burray village, situated on the island of Burray and connected to the Orkney Mainland via the historic Churchill Barriers. Performances and events are distributed across a variety of community infrastructure; main concerts are staged within a large, fully licensed marquee, while more intimate events, instrumental Q&As, and masterclasses take place in the Burray Community Hall and smaller secondary venues. A foundational pillar of the festival is its educational and participatory programming, which features formal, tutored workshops led by visiting artists covering banjo, fiddle, mandolin, bluegrass guitar, and vocal harmony. These structured sessions are complemented by dedicated areas designed to foster informal open jam sessions and acoustic collaborations.

Notable performers appearing at the festival include international acts such as Czech multi-instrumentalists Radim Zenkl and Ondra Kozák, Spanish bluegrass outfit Lluís Gómez & Ensemble, and Australian old-time musicians Jeri Foreman and Owl in the Sun, together with prominent domestic UK touring acts like Newcastle-based string band The Often Herd and Orcadian folk mainstays The Chair.

To accommodate the influx of seasonal musicians and enthusiasts, a range of local lodging is utilised, varying from established bed and breakfasts and self-catering cottages to dedicated, festival-managed campsites configured for both tents and motorhomes. Reflecting the broader cultural traditions of the archipelago, the festival is widely noted for its community-driven ethos and the distinct hospitality extended by the local Orcadian islanders to both domestic and international visitors.

== Bluegrass tutor bibliography ==
- Appalachian Autoharp (Carol Stober) Melbay 2010 ISBN 978-1609740542
- The Lost Art Of Country Bass (Keith Rosier) Hal Leonard 1997 ISBN 978-0793569922
- Bluegrass Guitar (Happy Traum) Oak Publications 1974 ISBN 978-0825601538
- Tony Rice Teaches Bluegrass Guitar: A Master Picker Analyzes His Pioneering Licks and Solos (Tony Rice) Homespun/Hal Leonard 1996; Audio Access Included ISBN 978-0-793-56048-6
- Old-Time Fiddle Tunes for Guitar (Richard Lieberson) Amsco Music Publishing Company 1974 ISBN 978-0-825-628092
- Earl Scruggs and The 5-String Banjo: Revised and Enhanced Edition; Audio Access Included (Earl Scruggs) Hal Leonard (2005) ISBN 978-0-634-06042-7
- Bluegrass Banjo (Peter Wernick) Oak Publications 1974 ISBN 978-0825601484
- John Burke's Book of Old-Time Fiddle Tunes for Banjo (John Burke) Amsco Music Publishing Company 1968 ISBN 08256-2801-6
- Masters of the 5-String Banjo (Tony Trischka & Peter Wernick) Oak Publications 1988. ISBN 0-8256-0298-X
- Bluegrass Mandolin (Jack Tottle) Oak Publications 1975 ISBN 978-0825601545
- Mike Compton (musician) Gallop to Georgia: The Tunes of Narmour & Smith for Mandolin (Mike Compton & Norman Blake) MinnerDipper Music, with accompanying CD. (December 2019)
- Mike Compton (musician) Rare And Fine: Uncommon Tunes of Bill Monroe - CD, with accompanying Mandolin notation and tablature (2022) MinnerDipper Music.
- Bluegrass Fiddle (Gene Lowinger) Music Sales America/Oak Publications 1974 ISBN 978-0825601507
- Bluegrass Songbook (Peter Wernick) Oak Publications 1976 ISBN 978-0825601644
- Jim Croce: Anthology, the stories behind the songs - with standard notation for 40 songs (Ingrid Croce) Hal Leonard/EMI Music Publishing, 2009 ISBN 9781423483021

=== Educational camps and workshops ===
- Sore Fingers Summer Schools – Large-scale bluegrass and old-time instructional camps in the United Kingdom.

=== Luthiers and instrument maintenance ===
- The Guitar Doctor – Specialised repair, setup, and restoration services for fretted and acoustic instruments based in Penzance, Cornwall, United Kingdom.
- Slim Jim Banjos – Handcrafted custom open-back banjos and specialised banjo repairs based in Shirrel Heath, Hampshire, United Kingdom.

While few European luthiers manufacture instruments exclusively for bluegrass, a specialised network of traditional violin and double bass makers provides the unique acoustic setups required by the genre. For the bluegrass fiddle, this typically involves cutting a flatter bridge profile to facilitate rapid double-stops and shuffling patterns. Traditional bluegrass double-bass players frequently require robust setups tailored for powerful acoustic projection, lower action, and the physical demands of "slap" or "thump" techniques. Due to the rigours of festival transport, rugged laminated or hybrid double basses are highly favoured by touring musicians.

In the United Kingdom, several established workshops specialise in the precision repairs, restorations, and adjustments needed for bluegrass string setups:

==== Fiddle and violin specialists ====
- https://moseleyviolins.co.uk Moseley Violins (Note: Located in Birmingham, this specialist workshop provides custom setups, structural repairs, and restorations for violins and double basses.)
- https://hannahviolin.co.uk Hannah Sedgwick Violin Making and Repair (Note: Based in Cornwall, an experienced traditional luthier frequently trusted by folk, fiddle, and acoustic string musicians to optimise action height, bridges, and soundposts.)
- https://andysfiddleworks.co.uk Andy's Fiddle Works (Note: Based in Canterbury, offering master-trained luthier setups, peg box rework, and high-quality bow rehairing for traditional players.)

==== Double bass specialists ====
- https://hepplestondoublebasses.co.uk Heppleston Double Basses (Note: Operating from West Yorkshire, this workshop is dedicated exclusively to the craftsmanship of new double basses and precision setups, including bridge and soundpost optimisation.)
- https://samwellsbass.co.uk Sam Wells Basses (Note: A Lancashire-based workshop with over 20 years of experience offering custom building, maintenance, and tailored setups to meet the specific tonal and physical demands of individual bassists.)
- https://laurencedixonbassplace.com Bass Place (Laurence Dixon) (Note: A prominent dedicated double bass workshop in London providing extensive restoration, maintenance, and robust structural repair services to active gigging musicians.)
- https://thomasmartin.co.uk T&G Martin (Note: A premier workshop offering highly specialised double bass structural overhauls and fine setup adjustments (bridge, fingerboard profile, and soundpost tuning) to optimise playability and string tension.)
