= Missy Raines =

American singer-songwriter

- Born: April 6, 1962 (age 64); Short Gap, West Virginia
- Genres: Bluegrass music
- Occupation: Musician
- Instrument: Bass
- Labels: Compass, Pinecastle, Rounder

Missy Raines (born April 6, 1962) is an American bassist, singer, teacher, and songwriter. She has won 10 International Bluegrass Music Awards for Bass Player of the Year. Missy Raines was the first woman to win IBMA Bass Player of the Year award. She won 1998, 1999, 2000, 2001, 2004, 2006, 2007, 2019, 2020, and 2021.

In 1998 Missy Raines' first solo album, My Place in the Sun (self-released), was named IBMA Instrumental Recording of the Year.

The Chicago Tribune named My Place in the Sun as one of the Top 10 Records of 1998.

In 2018, "Swept Away" from Missy's album Royal Traveller (Compass Records) was awarded IBMA "Recorded Event of the Year. The song features the First Ladies of Bluegrass named so for being the first women to win in their instrumental category, Missy Raines (bass), Alison Brown (banjo), Becky Buller, (fiddle), Sierra Hull, (mandolin), and Molly Tuttle, (guitar).

In 2019, "Darlin' Pal(s) of Mine" also from Missy's album Royal Traveller, was named IBMA "Instrumental Recording of the Year". This features bassists Mike Bub and Todd Phillips, as well as Alison Brown on banjo.

In 2020, Missy Raines' album Royal Traveller, produced by Alison Brown, (Compass Records) was nominated for a Grammy.

In 2020, Missy won IBMA "Song of the Year" for "Chicago Barn Dance" as co-writer along with Becky Buller and Alison Brown. The song was performed and recorded by the Chicago-based band "Special Consensus".

== Biography ==
Hailing from Short Gap, West Virginia, Raines began playing bass and touring professionally as a teenager. Today, she plays both straight-ahead bluegrass and more progressive forms of music.

She has worked with legends such as Mac Wiseman, Kenny Baker, Josh Graves, and Eddie & Martha Adcock to current artists such as Peter Rowan, Laurie Lewis, Dudley Connell, and Don Rigsby, and the Brother Boys.

=== Cloud Valley ===
Raines was a member of the progressive bluegrass band Cloud Valley with Bill Evans (banjo), Charlie Rancke (guitar), and Steve Smith (mandolin). They released two albums: A Bluegrass Ensemble in 1983 and Live In Europe in 1985.

=== Jim Hurst and Missy Raines ===
Missy Raines toured extensively from 1998 to 2005 in a duo with Jim Hurst. They recorded two albums for the Pinecastle label: Two in 1999 and Synergy in 2003.

=== Claire Lynch Band ===
Missy and Jim joined the Claire Lynch Band in 2005 (along with David Harvey) when Lynch returned to the road after a hiatus. The band recorded two more albums: New Day and Crowd Favorites, both on Rounder Records. Missy left the band in 2008, and was replaced by Mark Schatz.

=== Missy Raines & the New Hip ===
In 2008, Missy established her Americana/jazz-tinged ensemble Missy Raines & The New Hip, who have released two albums on the Compass label: Inside Out released February 10, 2009, and New Frontier released September 2013. Besides Missy, the New Hip includes Ethan Ballinger (guitar), Jarrod Walker (mandolin), and Cody Walker (drums).

=== Helen Highwater Stringband ===
Raines is a member of the bluegrass supergroup the Helen Highwater Stringband, along with Mike Compton, David Grier, and Shad Cobb. They released an eponymous EP in 2015.

=== Online Bass School ===
In 2011, she began teaching double bass online at the Online Bluegrass Bass School with Missy Raines, as part of the ArtistWorks Academy of Bluegrass.

=== I'll Take Love ===
Missy co-produced and played on the Compass release I'll Take Love, a collection of Louisa Branscomb's songs sung by a top list of artists including The Whites, Alison Krauss, Claire Lynch, Steve Gulley, Dale Ann Bradley, Josh Williams, John Cowan, and more.

== Discography ==
=== Solo albums ===
- 1998: My Place In The Sun (self-released)
- 2009: Inside Out (Compass) with The New Hip
- 2013: New Frontier (Compass) with The New Hip
- 2018: Royal Traveller (Compass)

=== With Claire Lynch ===
- 1997: Silver And Gold (Rounder)
- 2000: Love Light (Rounder)
- 2006: New Day (Rounder)
- 2007: Crowd Favorites (Rounder)
- 2012: Hills of Alabam (Rebel)

=== With Jim Hurst and Missy Raines ===
- 1999: Two (Pinecastle)
- 2003: Synergy (Pinecastle)

=== With Helen Highwater Stringband ===
- 2015: Helen Highwater Stringband EP (self-released)

=== As composer ===
- 2006: April Verch - Take Me Back (Rounder) - track 3, "All In A Night" (co-written with Claire Lynch)

=== As producer ===
- 1995: The Abeels - The Abeels (self-released)

=== Also appears on ===
- 1982: Cloud Valley - A Bluegrass Ensemble (Outlet)
- 1985: Cloud Valley - Live in Europe (Strictly Country)
- 1987: Eddie Adcock & Talk of the Town - Eddie Adcock & Talk of the Town (CMH)
- 1990: Masters - Saturday Night Fish Fry (CMH)
- 1990: Mac Wiseman - Grassroots to Bluegrass (CMH)
- 1995: Bill Evans - Native and Fine (Rounder)
- 2000: Alison Brown - Fair Weather (Compass) - bass on track 6, "Hummingbird"
- 2001: Mike Burns - Walk the Water's Edge (North Co Music)
- 2003: White House - White House (Pinecastle)
- 2004: K. C. Groves - Something Familiar (Skylark)
- 2005: Valerie Smith & Liberty Pike - That's What Love Can Do (Bell Buckle)
- 2010: The Toy Hearts - Femme Fatale (Woodville)
- 2015: Sam Gleaves - Ain't We Brothers (Community Music)
- 2016: Kate Campbell - The K.O.A Tapes, Vol. 1 (Large River)
- 2017: Bobby Osborne - Original (Compass)
