= Internationales Bühler Bluegrass Festival =

The international Bühler Bluegrass Festival is an annual music festival in Bühl (Baden), Germany. Since 2003, it usually takes place in April or May. Each year, there are four to seven bands from the US, Canada and Europe. The musical spectrum ranges from oldtime, bluegrass and folk to Americana.

Since 2011, the city of Bühl has been the organizer of the festival. In the years before, the city of Bühl and the cabaret „Kleinkunst im Schütte-Keller“ were co-organizers. Walter Fuchs, a radio-host and author, moderated the program until 2015. His son, Patrick Fuchs, took over the artistic direction and moderation in 2016.

Due to the positive response from the audience the festival, which was limited to one day until 2008, now takes place on two days (with one exception in 2003 when it was for one day only). Since 2017, the first festival day takes place on the grounds of the main sponsor. The second day of the festival remains in the Bürgerhaus Neuer Markt.

The concept of the festival also includes an open-air event on the Johannesplatz in the Bühler city center on Saturday morning.

== Past dates & bands/artists ==
Date	Bands
16 - 17 May 2025	Bluegrass Cash & Kikki Géron (D/NL), Hayseed Dixie (USA), Taff Rapids (UK), Blue Weed (I), The Slocan Ramblers (CAN), Kristy Cox & Grasstime (AUS/USA)
3 - 5 May 2024	Lonesome Ace Stringband (CAN), Truffle Valley Boys (I), Bashed Potatoes (D), Bertolf & Bluefinger (NL), Cole Quest & The City Pickers (USA), John Jorgenson Bluegrass Band (USA), Irene Kelley (USA)
5 - 6 May 2023	Johnny & The Yooahoos (D), Blue Grass Boogiemen (NL), Boom Ditty (F), Cousin Hatfield (NL), Fog Holler (USA), Level Best (USA)
13 - 14 May 2022	Seth Mulder & Midnight Run (USA), The Hackensaw Boys (USA), Old Salt (B), Chatham County Line (USA)
17 - 18 May 2019	Henhouse Prowlers (USA), Dieselknecht (D), Bluegrass Breakdown (D), Stereo Naked (D), Lonesome Ace Stringband (CAN), Rob Ickes & Trey Hensley (USA), Jeff Scroggins & Colorado (USA)
11 - 12 May 2018	Pert Near Sandstone (USA), Murder Murder (CAN), St. Beaufort (D), Ila Auto (NOR), Sierra Hull (USA), Peter Rowan (USA) & Red Wine (I)
19 - 20 May 2017	Jussi Syren & The Groundbreakers (FIN), The Dead South (CAN), Dapper Dan Men (D), The Country Pickers (CH), Curly Strings (EST), Chris Jones & The Night Drivers (USA), Balsam Range (USA)
13 - 14 May 2016	Thomm Jutz & Milan Miller (USA), Ruben & Matt and The Truffle Valley Boys (I), Flats & Sharps (GB), The Dead South (CAN), Monroe Crossing (USA), Claire Lynch Band (USA)
15 - 16 May 2015	New Step In Grass (F), Dunderhead (S), Growling Old Men (USA/D), Rawhide (B), Milk Drive (USA), Doyle Lawson & Quicksilver (USA)
02 - 03 May 2014	Field & Thompson (USA), Foghorn Stringband (USA), John Lowell Band (USA), Tabea & TRAM (CH/I), Tumbling Bones (USA), Della Mae (USA)
04 May 2013	Chris Jones & The Night Drivers (USA), The Deadly Gentlemen (USA), Monroe Crossing (USA), The Roys and Band (USA/CAN)
04 - 05 May 2012	Bluegrass 43 (F), Oh My Darling (CAN), G-Runs‘n Roses (CZ), Alecia Nugent (USA), Tabea & Bluegrass Stuff (CH/I), The Gibson Brothers (USA)
13 - 14 May 2011	Sunny Mountain Grass (CH), Valerie Smith & Liberty Pike (USA), Redgrass (CAN), The Toy Hearts (GB), Special Consensus (USA), Doyle Lawson & Quicksilver (USA)
14 - 15 May 2010	4WheelDrive & Jolanda Peters (NL), Uncle Earl (USA), The Midnight Ramblers (USA), G2 Bluegrass Band (S), James Talley & 4WheelDrive (USA/NL), The Sons of Navarone (B)
01 - 02 May 2009	Wayne Henderson & Helen White (USA), The Looping Brothers (D), Crooked Still (USA), Nugget (A), Laurie Lewis & The Right Hands (USA), Randy Waller & The Country Gentlemen (USA), The Moonlighters (USA)
03 May 2008	Main Spring (D), Frigg (FIN), Don Rigsby & Midnight Call (USA), The Infamous Stringdusters (USA)
05 May 2007	Sacred Sounds Of Grass (D), Turquoise (F), Roland Heinrich & The Jimmie Rodgers Experience (D), The Wilders (USA), The Claire Lynch Band (USA)
29 April 2006	Night Run (D), Red Wine (I), Chris Jones & The Night Drivers (USA), Valerie Smith & Liberty Pike (USA)
09 April 2005	Grand Ole Country (NL), Lost Highway (USA), Nugget (A), The Crooked Jades (USA)
03 April 2004	Bluegrass Boogiemen (NL), One4Five (D), The Musselwhite Family (USA), Turquoise (F), The Kathy Kallick Band (USA)
12 April 2003	Groundspeed (D), 4 Wheel Drive (NL), Bluegrass Stuff (I), Special Consensus (USA)

== History ==
The precursor of the Bühler event was the Güglingen Bluegrass Festival, an annual music festival held from 1986 to 2001 in Güglingen near Heilbronn. It soon became the most important bluegrass festival in continental Europe. The most famous bands in the American bluegrass scene that performed in Güglingen were The Nashville Bluegrass Band, Country Gazette, The Tony Rice Unit, Laurie Lewis & Grant Street and Tim O'Brien & the O'Boys. The Güglingen Bluegrass Festival took place for the last time in 2001 – not because of a lack of audience response, but because of organizational problems.

In 2003, Bluegrass and country music expert Walter Fuchs, the former mayor of the city of Bühl Hans Striebel, the city manager of the culture department Hans Störk, and Rüdiger Schmitt from the cabaret „Schütte-Keller” launched the International Bühler Bluegrass Festival after one year of preparation. For the first time it took place in Bühl on April 12, 2003. The festival is the most important event for bluegrass folk and americana music in the entire German-speaking region.
