= Loar =

Loar is a surname. Notable people with the surname include:

- Edward Loar (born 1977), American golfer
- Lloyd Loar (1886–1943), American mandolin designer
