= Crowd Favorites =

Studio album by Claire Lynch
- Released: 2007
- Genre: Bluegrass
- Label: Rounder Records

Claire Lynch chronology
New Day (2006)	Crowd Favorites (2007)	Whatcha Gonna Do (2009)

Professional ratings
Review scores
Source	Rating
AllMusic	4/5 stars

Crowd Favorites is the eighth studio album by bluegrass musician Claire Lynch. The album is a collection of previously released tracks along with four new tracks released on Rounder Records, three of which were originally from Lynch's time with the Front Porch String Band. Contributing artists on the album include Missy Raines, Jason Thomas, Jim Hurst, Rob Ickes, and Larry Lynch. The album reached No. 10 on the Bluegrass Album chart in Billboard magazine.

== Track listing ==
No.	Title	Length
1.	"Train Long Gone"	3:14
2.	"The Day That Lester Died"	2:48
3.	"Fallin' in Love"	3:01
4.	"Hills of Alabam'"	3:19
5.	"If Wishes Were Horses"	2:35
6.	"Your Presence Is My Favorite Gift"	2:26
7.	"Jealousy"	3:40
8.	"Silver and Gold"	3:43
9.	"Sweetheart, Darlin' of Mine"	3:04
10.	"Kennesaw Line"	4:41
11.	"Thibodaux"	3:09
12.	"Wabash Cannonball"	8:03
13.	"He Don't Like to Talk About It"	3:04
14.	"Friends For a Lifetime (Song for Kegan)"	2:54

== Chart performance ==
Chart (2007)	Peak position
US Top Bluegrass Albums (Billboard)	10
