= Dear Sister (album) =

Studio album by Claire Lynch
- Released: 2013
- Genre: Bluegrass
- Label: Compass Records

Claire Lynch chronology
| Whatcha Gonna Do (2009) | Dear Sister (2013) | North by South (2016) |

Professional ratings
Review scores
| Source | Rating |
|---|---|
| AllMusic | 3.5/5 stars |

Dear Sister is the tenth studio album from bluegrass musician Claire Lynch. The album reached No. 9 on the Bluegrass Album chart in Billboard magazine. The track, "Dear Sister", won the 2014 International Bluegrass Music Association award for Song of the Year.

== History ==
The song "Dear Sister" is based on author Frank Anderson Chappel and his 2002 book Dear Sister: Civil War Letters to a Sister in Alabama. The sister detailed in the book is an ancestor of author Chappel. Album co-writer Louisa Branscomb also has a connection similar to that of Chappel. Branscomb has a great-great aunt who had four brothers in the civil war, all of whom wrote letters to her which she saved after being found in the 20th Century.

== Track listing ==
| No. | Title | Length |
|---|---|---|
| 1. | "How Many Moons" | 3:18 |
| 2. | "Doin' Time" | 4:37 |
| 3. | "Once the Teardrops Start To Fall" | 4:27 |
| 4. | "Need Someone" | 3:29 |
| 5. | "Dear Sister" | 4:43 |
| 6. | "I'll Be Alright Tomorrow" | 2:54 |
| 7. | "Patch of Blue" | 3:09 |
| 8. | "That Kind of Love" | 3:56 |
| 9. | "Everybody Knows I've Been Crying" | 3:51 |
| 10. | "Buttermilk Road / the Arbours" | 3:48 |

== Chart performance ==
| Chart (2013) | Peak position |
|---|---|
| US Top Bluegrass Albums (Billboard) | 9 |
