= Claire Lynch =

Claire Lynch may refer to:

- Claire Lynch (musician)
- Claire Lynch (writer)
