= North by South =

Studio album by Claire Lynch
- Released: September 16, 2016
- Genre: Bluegrass
- Length: 33:44
- Label: Compass Records
- Producer: Alison Brown

Claire Lynch chronology
Dear Sister (2013)	North by South (2016)

North by South is a 2016 album by American bluegrass musician Claire Lynch. It peaked at number five on the Bluegrass Albums chart, and earned Lynch a Grammy Award nomination for Best Bluegrass Album.

== Track listing ==
No.	Title	Writer(s)	Length
1.	"Cold Hearted Wind"	Ron Sexsmith	3:13
2.	"Molly May"	Gervais Cormier, J.P. Cormier	4:14
3.	"Kingdom Come"	Old Man Luedecke	3:11
4.	"Andrew's Waltz"	Willie P. Bennett	3:08
5.	"Empty Train"	David Francey	3:38
6.	"Gone Again"	Cris Cuddy	3:06
7.	"Black Flowers"	Lynn Miles	3:04
8.	"Milo"	Claire Lynch	3:18
9.	"It's Worth Believin'"	Gordon Lightfoot	3:08
10.	"All the Diamonds In the World"	Bruce Cockburn	3:16
Total length:			33:44

== Personnel ==
- Alison Brown - Guitar
- Jerry Douglas - Dobro
- Stuart Duncan - Fiddle
- Béla Fleck - Banjo
- David Grier - Guitar
- Claire Lynch - Guitar, Vocals
- Kenny Malone - Percussion
- Bryan McDowell - Banjo, fiddle, guitar, mandolin, tenor banjo, vocals
- Mark Schatz - Bass, jaw harp
- Jeff Taylor - Accordion
- Jarrod Walker - Guitar, mandolin, vocal harmony
- Matt Wingate - Guitar, vocal harmony
