= Bluegrass in La Roche =

Annual music festival in France

Bluegrass in La Roche is an annual bluegrass music festival in La Roche-sur-Foron, France. Organized and hosted by Roch'événements, this festival was founded by Christopher Howard-Williams in 2004, with its first event in 2006. Every year, the festival hosts a melting pot of bluegrass bands from all around the world, including Grammy award-winning artists Molly Tuttle and Tim O'Brien.

This festival is held during the first week and weekend of August in La Roche-sur-Foron, near Geneva, and has been nominated 5 times for Event of the Year at the IBMA Awards. In 2025, the festival celebrates its 20th edition.

== History ==
The idea for a bluegrass festival was sent around after Christopher Howard-Williams had performed in town, and noticed the immense support for bluegrass music. After the separation of the EBMA (European Bluegrass Music Association), and EWOB (European World of Bluegrass), the host of EWOB, Dennis Schutt, needed a new location for the event. This caught the attention of Christopher who went to see Didier Philippe, the director of the Tourist Bureau, who was on the hunt for a new summer attraction. The idea was also brought to the Cultural Attache, Roland Jobard, in 2004, who, despite having no knowledge of bluegrass music, was eager to get the festival on its feet, famously responding to the suggestion to organise a Bluegrass festival "why not, what's Bluegrass?".

While planning for the first iteration of the festival, the planning group decided against charging for entry as many people in the area had never heard of bluegrass music before. They might not be as willing to interact with a festival that could potentially waste their time and money. This would also encourage attendees to spend more on food and drink, which was entirely sourced and made locally by volunteers.

The inaugural festival took place in August, 2006, and since then has welcomed more than 290 bands from all around the world. The Bluegrass in La Roche festival was, for an extended period of time, free to the public, and even though this has changed, it remains incredibly affordable in comparison to many other music festivals. This is due to the overwhelming volunteer support, including food and services.

== Acts ==
Performers include Molly Tuttle, Blue Highway, East Nash Grass, AJ Lee and Blue Summit, Compton and Newberry, Della Mae, Lonesome River Band, Missy Raines and Allegheny, Rob Ickes and Trey Hensley, Ronnie Bowman, Carrie Hassler and Hard Rain, Special Consensus, Tim O'Brien Band, Broken Compass Bluegrass, Rapidgrass, G-Runs 'n Roses, Mile Twelve, Frank Solivan & Dirty Kitchen Crying Uncle, Country Gongbang.

Bluegrass in La Roche has also hosted bands from further afield, notably Country Gongbang (South Korea) in 2022 and Grassy Strings (India) 2023.

== Band Contest ==
Every year, bands from around the world compete for first place in La Roche's band contest, earning themselves cash prizes.

In 2015, no band contest took place in order to celebrate the 10th anniversary of the festival. All winners of past contests were invited back to play.

In 2017, the two bands Pine Marten and Le Chat Mort tied for first place. The festival suspended the contest after in 2019.

The following is a list of the winners:

- 2006 - Bluegrass Stuff (Italy)
- 2007 - Kralik & his Rowdy Rascals (Czech Republic)
- 2008 - Monogram (Czech Republic)
- 2009 - KRENI (Czech Republic)
- 2010 - G-Runs n Roses (Czech Republic)
- 2011 - Blackjack (Czech Republic)
- 2012 - Sons of Navarone (Belgium)
- 2013 - East West (Czech Republic)
- 2014 - The Jumper Cables (Czech Republic)
- 2016 - G-Runs n Roses (Czech Republic)
- 2017 - Pine Marten (Ireland)
- 2017 - Le Chat Mort (Sweden)
- 2018 - The Often Herd (United Kingdom)
- 2019 - Professional Deformation (Czech Republic)
