= Orville Gibson =

Founder of the Gibson Guitar Company (1856–1918)

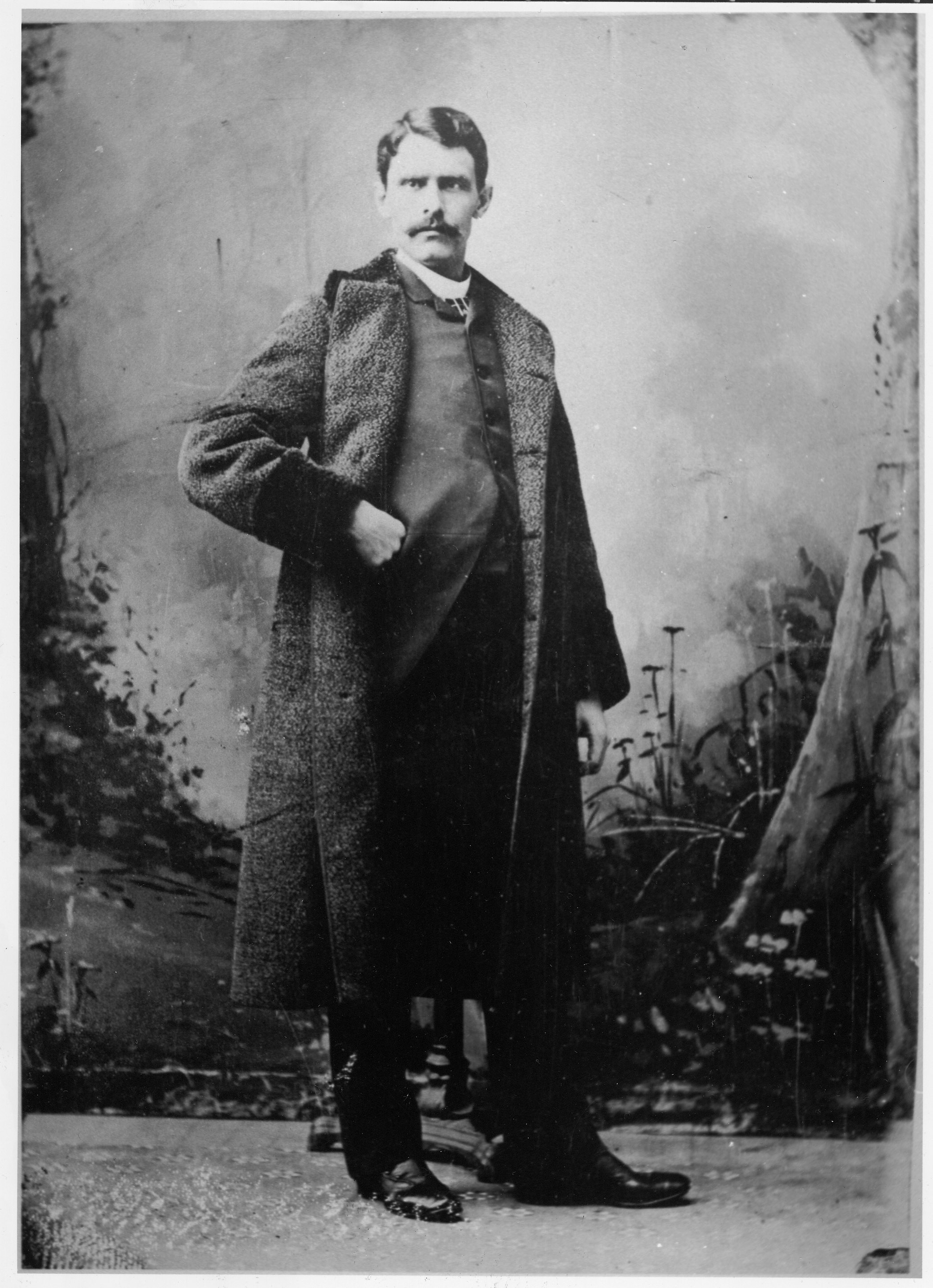
- Gibson, pre-1910
- Born: Orville H. Gibson; May 8, 1856; Chateaugay, New York, U.S.
- Died: August 19, 1918 (aged 62); Ogdensburg, New York, U.S.
- Occupations: Luthier, inventor, company founder

Orville H. Gibson (May 8, 1856 – August 19, 1918) was an American luthier who founded the Gibson Guitar Company in Kalamazoo, Michigan, in 1902, makers of guitars, mandolins and other instruments.

His earliest known instrument was a 10-string mandolin-guitar, which bears the date 1894. Gibson's mandolins were "unlike any previous flatback instrument," according to music historian Paul Sparks. His company's manufacturing standards were very high, and his instruments heavily marketed.

== Early life ==
Orville H. Gibson was born in 1856 and on a farm near Chateaugay, Franklin County, New York. He was the youngest of five children to an English father John W. Gibson and American mother Amy Nichols Gibson who later migrated to Peru, New York.

== Mandolin style ==
Gibson began in 1894 in his home workshop in Kalamazoo, Michigan, and patented his idea for mandolins in 1898. With no formal training, Gibson created an entirely new style of mandolin and guitar that followed violin design, with its curved top and bottom carved into shape, rather than pressed or bent, arched like the top of a violin. He applied for and was granted a patent on the design. The sides too were carved out of a single block of wood, rather than being made of bent wood strips. More importantly, they were louder and more durable than contemporary fretted instruments, and musicians soon demanded more than he was able to build in his one-man shop.

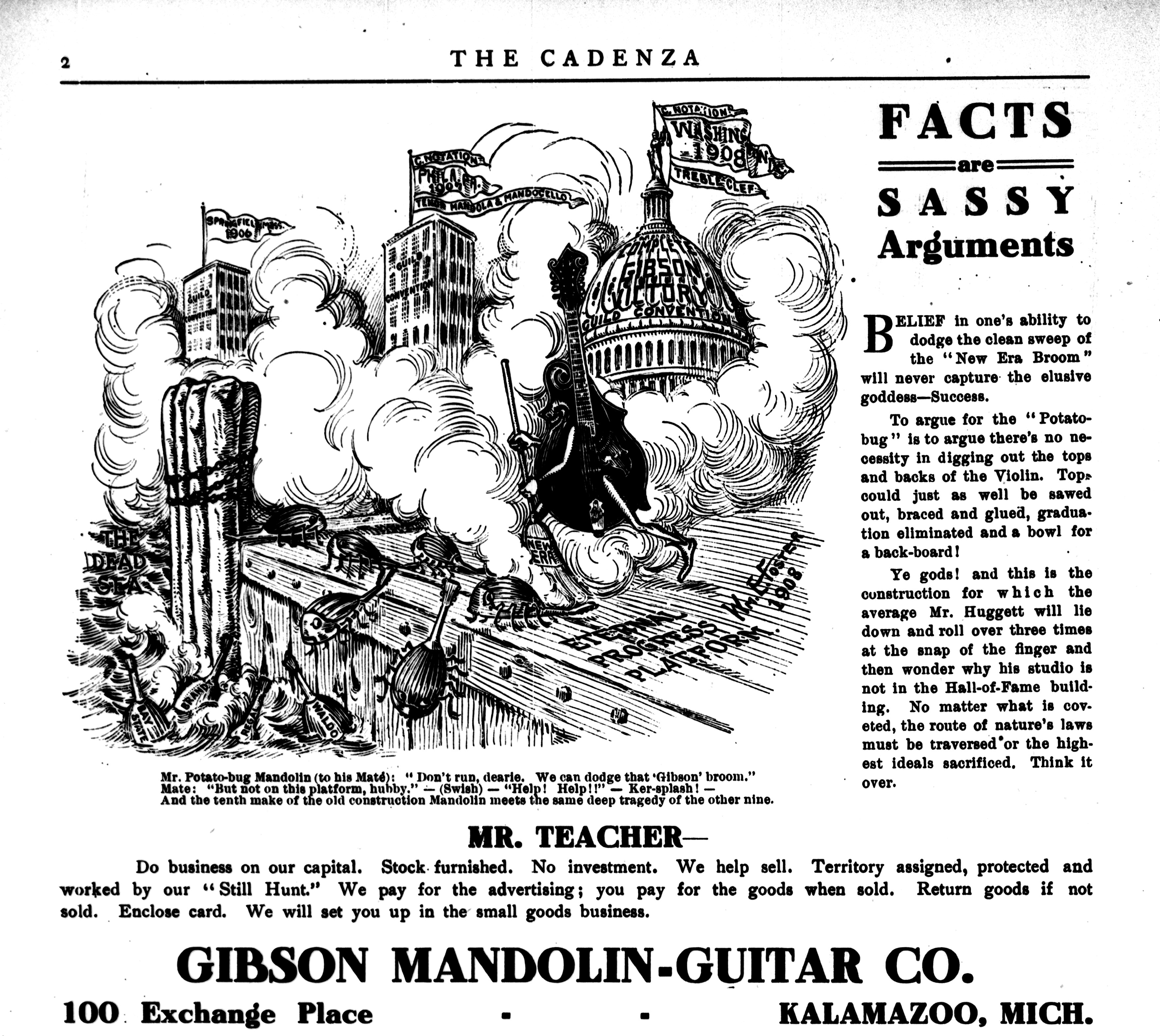
In this 1908 advertisement, Gibson aggressively promoted the idea that his mandolins represented progress. It disparaged the older round-back mandolins as "potato bugs", swept into the dead sea by the "new era broom".

On the strength of Gibson's ideas, five Kalamazoo businessmen formed the Gibson Mandolin-Guitar Mfg. Co., Ltd., in 1902. Within a short period after the company was started, the board passed a motion that "Orville H. Gibson be paid only for the actual time he works for the Company." After that time, there is no clear indication whether he worked there full-time, or as a consultant. Julius Bellson states in his 1973 publication, The Gibson Story, that "Orville Gibson had visions and dreams that were considered eccentric."

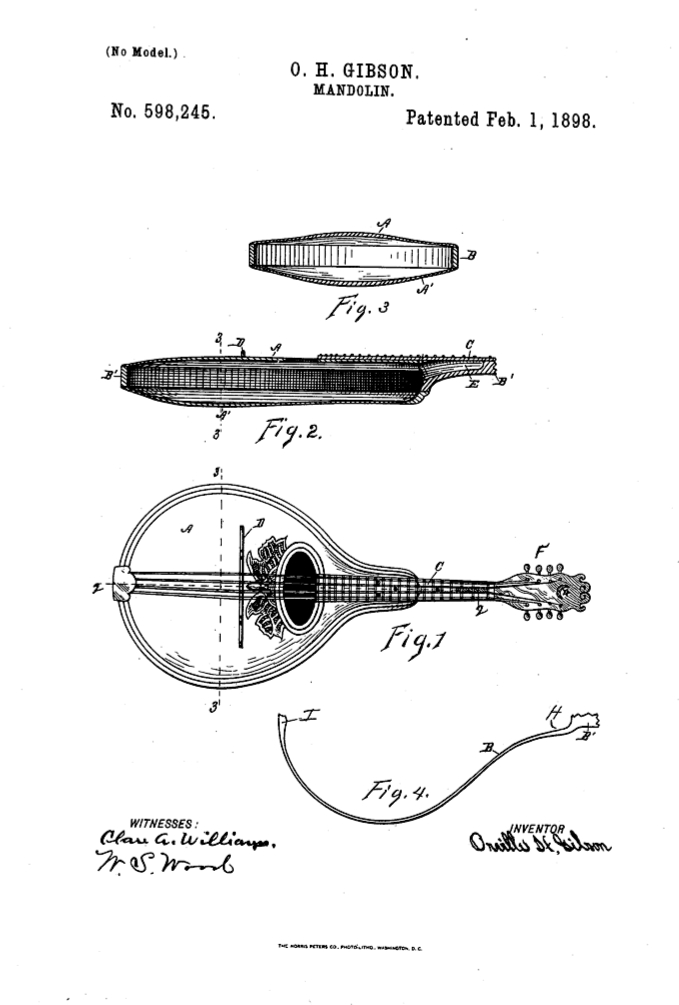
US Patent No. 598.245, patent drawing for the archtop mandolin

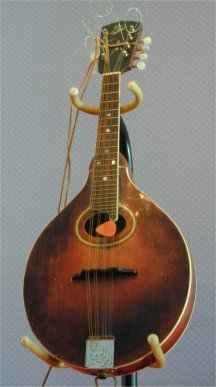
1921 A4 mandolin (pickguard was removed)

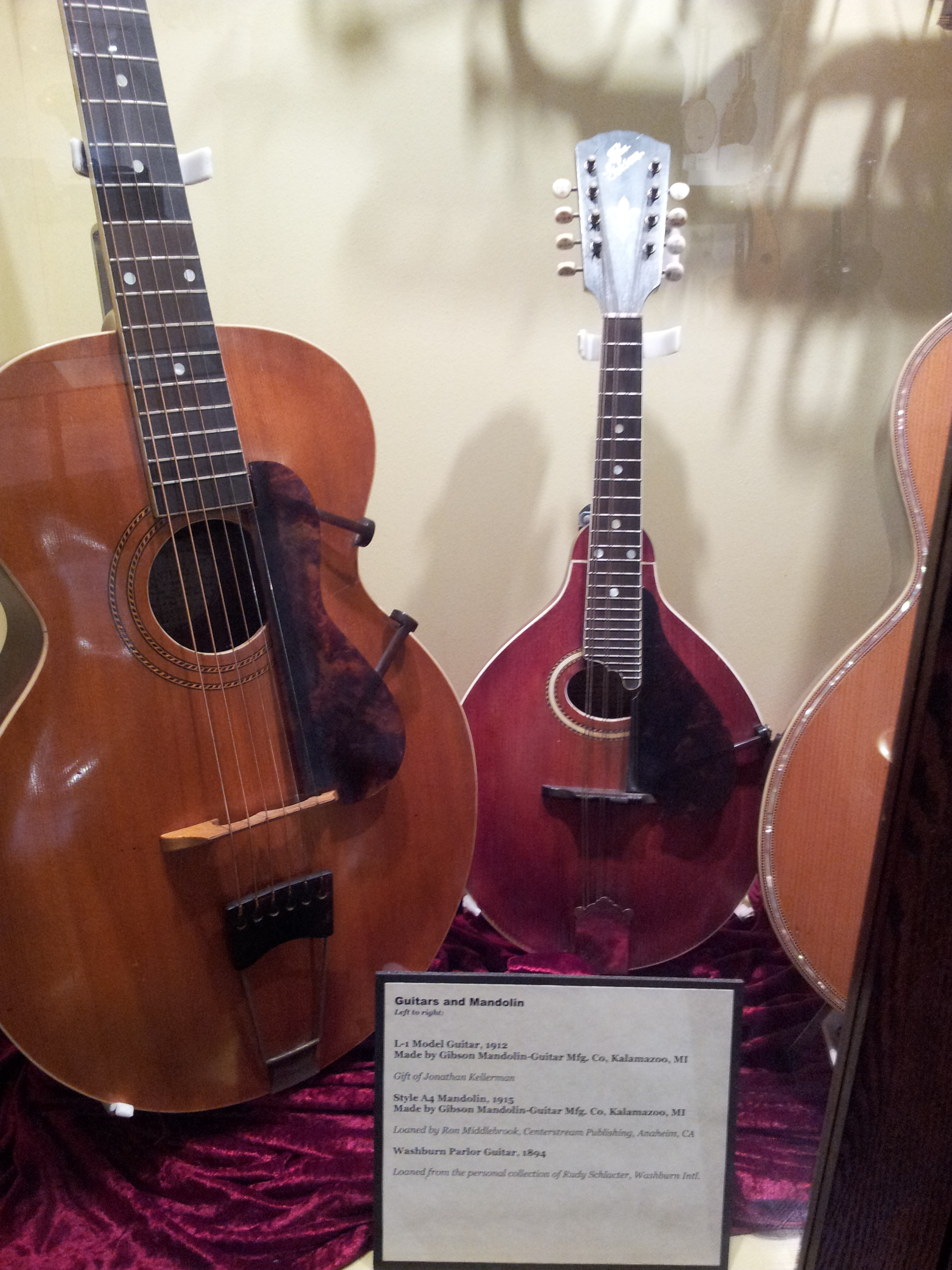
L-1 carved top guitar, c. 1912 and A4 mandolin, c. 1915.

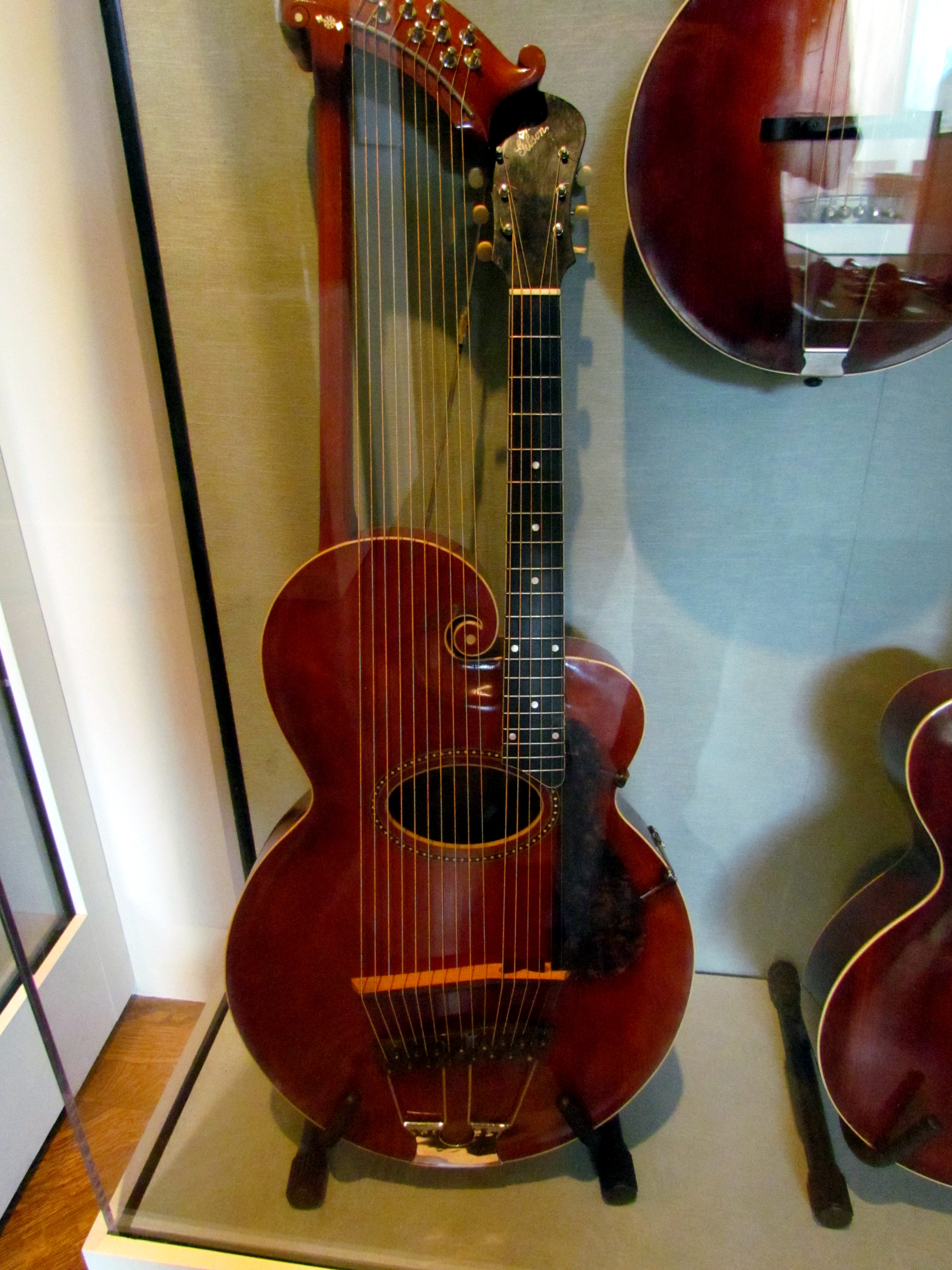
Style U harp guitar. c. 1911

He and his company used music teachers to market the instruments, and strong print advertisements to displace the round-backed mandolins. They were successful in the mandolin market, eliminating the production of round-backed instruments in the U.S. His guitars were influential as well, and his guitar patterns are still recognizable in modern jazz guitars.

According to George Gruhn, the idea of carving the instrument tops and bottoms appears to have originated with Gibson and is not based on any mandolin or guitar building tradition. Although inspired by the carving of violins, he did not use violin manufacturing techniques or patterns to build his instruments.

His company, with the help of instrument designer and sound engineer Lloyd Loar produced the Gibson F-5 mandolin, which Sparks said was acknowledged "to be the finest flat-back mandolin ever produced." Loar also designed the L-5 guitar. Among the changes that Loar introduced was the f-hole instead of a round or oval sound-hole, another violin-family feature imported to the mandolin. The mandolins are treasured by bluegrass musicians, but produce opposite feelings of admiration or contempt among the classical musicians they were designed for. The L-5 guitar has found a home among jazz musicians.

Starting in 1908, Gibson was paid a salary of $500 by Gibson Mandolin-Guitar Manufacturing Co., Limited (equivalent to $20,000 a year in modern terms).

== Later life and death ==
After establishing his instrument-making business in Kalamazoo, Michigan, Gibson returned to northern New York around 1910 and lived in Malone, where he continued making guitars and mandolins by hand.

He had a number of stays in hospitals between 1907 and 1911. In 1916, he was again hospitalized, and died on August 19, 1918, at 62 years of age, in St. Lawrence State Hospital in Ogdensburg, New York. Gibson is buried at Morningside Cemetery in Malone, New York.

According to the 1900 U.S. Federal Census, he was born in May, and his obituary published in The Malone Farmer on Wednesday, August 21, 1918, states he died on August 19 and his funeral was held at the home of his brother O. M. Gibson on August 21.

== Bibliography ==
- Chris Gill (1994-09-01). "About Orville Gibson". Guitar Player (September 1994).
- Sparks, Paul (2003). The Classical Mandolin. Oxford: Oxford University Press. ISBN 9780195173376.
