= Jim Hurst =

American singer-songwriter

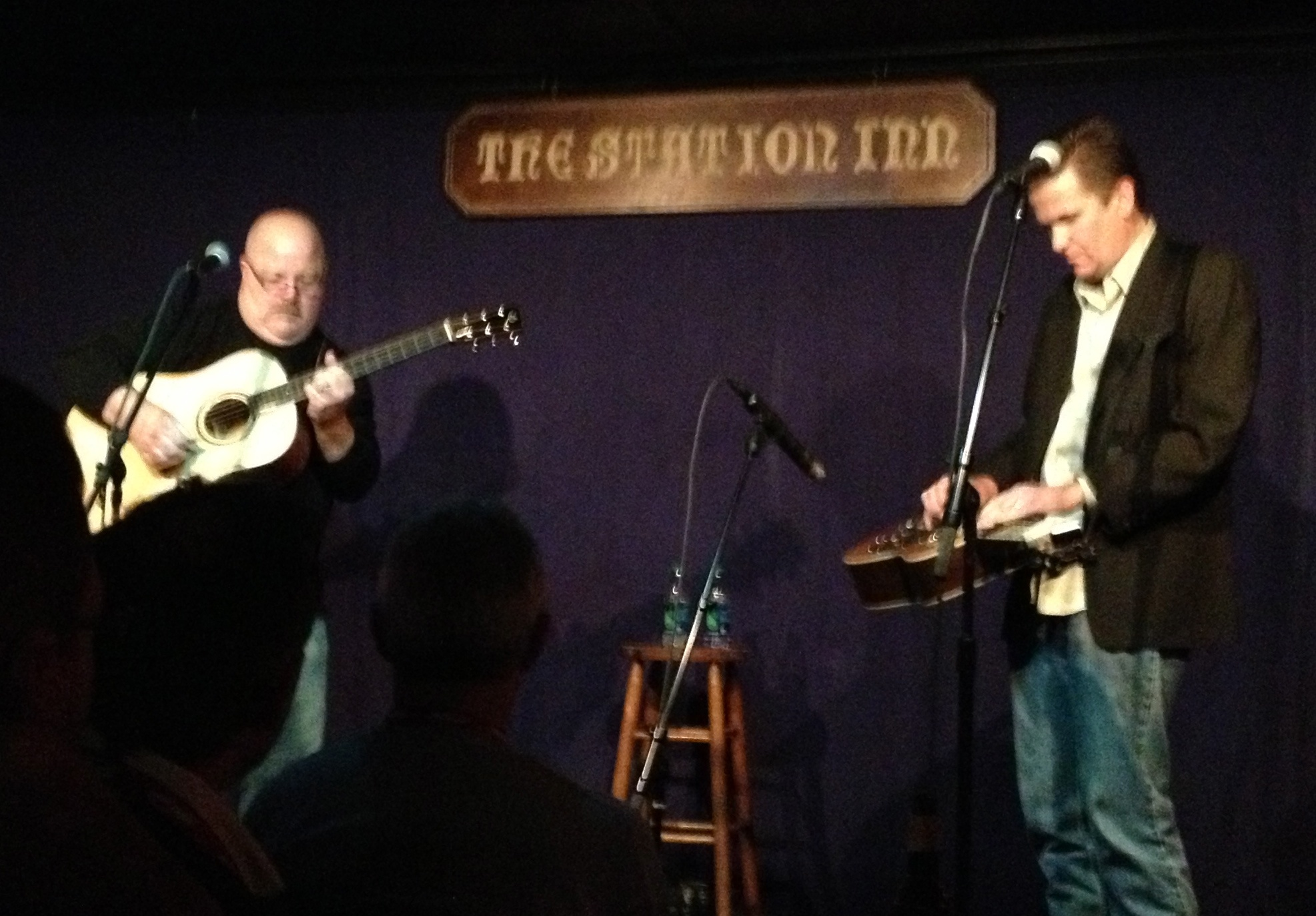
- Jim Hurst (left) and Rob Ickes (right) performing in 2012

Background information
- Born: James Edward Hurst
- Genres: Country, Bluegrass
- Instrument: Guitar
- Label: Pinecastle
- Website: www.jimhurst.com

James Edward “Jim” Hurst is an American bluegrass and country guitarist. He is known primarily as an instrumentalist but has also been credited for vocals with numerous other artists as well as his solo career. Hurst has performed with musicians that include Holly Dunn, Trisha Yearwood, Sara Evans, and Missy Raines. He has also won numerous awards for his work.

== Career ==
Hurst began his career with playing country music in the 1980s and 90s. He was the guitarist for Holly Dunn and the Rio Band where he played both nationally and internationally. He toured with Trisha Yearwood where he played acoustic and electric guitar.

Hurst joined Claire Lynch and the Front Porch String Band in 1995 and helped Lynch form the new band in 2005. He was a member up until 2010 when Matt Wingate signed on as guitarist; Hurst returned when Wingate left in 2015. During his time with the original Front Porch String Band, he met Missy Raines and they formed the duet "Jim Hurst and Missy Raines," playing together until 2000. During their time together they released two albums which won them International Bluegrass Music Awards for Guitar Player of the Year and Bass Player of the Year in both 2001 and 2002.

Hurst also performed Sara Evans, appearing on her 1998 album No Place That Far with both acoustic guitar and vocals. He was also nominated for Guitar Player of the Year in 2015, an award presented by the International Bluegrass Music Association.

== Discography ==
=== Albums ===
Solo albums

Title	Album details	Peak positions
Title	Album details	US Bluegrass
Looking Glass	Release date: 22 August 2014; Label: Self-Release	--
Intrepid	Release date: 15 February 2012; Label: NN Guido Music	--
A Box of Chocolates	Release date: 2007; Label: Self-Release	--
Second Son	Release date: 23 April 2001; Label: Pinecastle Records	--
Open Window	Release date: 1998; Label: NN Guido Music	--

As part of Jim Hurst and Missy Raines

Title	Album details	Peak positions
Title	Album details	US Bluegrass
Synergy	Release date: 12 August 2003; Label: Pinecastle Records	--
Two	Release date: 2000; Label: Pinecastle Records	--

== Awards and recognition ==
Year	Association	Category	Result
2015	International Bluegrass Music Awards	Instrumental Performers of the Year - Guitar	Nominated
2002	International Bluegrass Music Awards	Instrumental Performers of the Year - Guitar	Won
2001	International Bluegrass Music Awards	Instrumental Performers of the Year - Guitar	Won
