= Vivi-Tone =

Musical instrument company

Vivi-Tone was a musical instrument company formed in partnership by former instrument designer for Gibson Guitar Corporation, Lloyd Loar, Lewis A. Williams, and Walter Moon. The company was incorporated in Kalamazoo, Michigan on November 1, 1933, with executive offices in Detroit. Though the company brought forth many innovative ideas in instrument design, it was ultimately commercially unsuccessful.

== Instruments ==
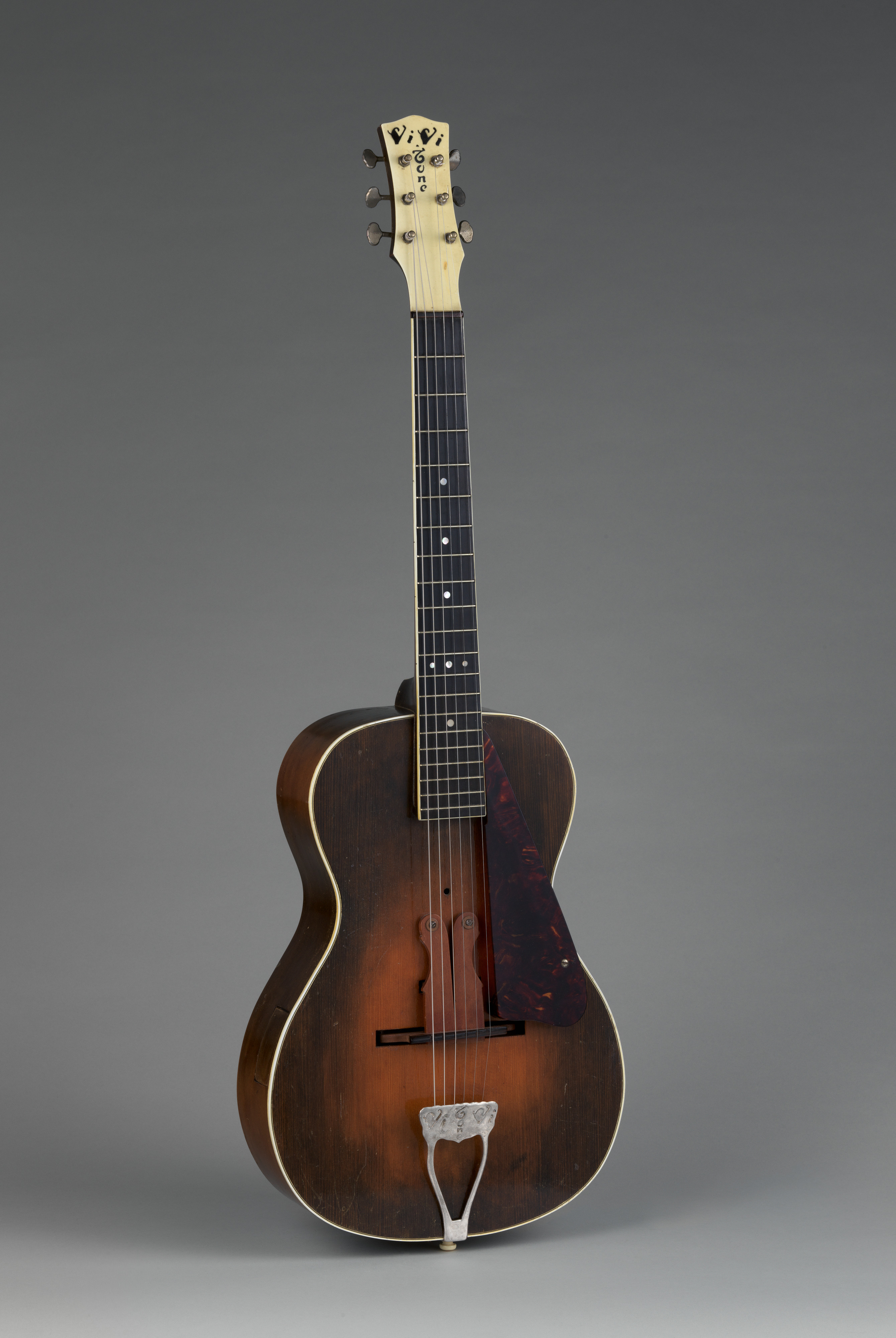
Vivi-Tone Acoustic-Electric Guitar (c. 1933), exhibited at the Metropolitan Museum of Art [2016.415a, b]

Vivi-Tone produced guitars, violins, mandolins, an electric keyboard, and at least one amplifier (the so-called "Aggrandizer"). One acoustic guitar design featured a secondary soundboard (the back of the guitar) as well as a primary soundboard (the top of the guitar). This secondary soundboard had f-holes, and was recessed from the rim of the guitar to keep this soundboard away from the player’s body. Another acoustic-electric guitar design from the mid-1930s had essentially a plank body, making it one of the very early examples of a solid body guitar.

== See also ==
- Lloyd Loar
- Electric guitar
- Electric piano
