= St. Beaufort =

Band

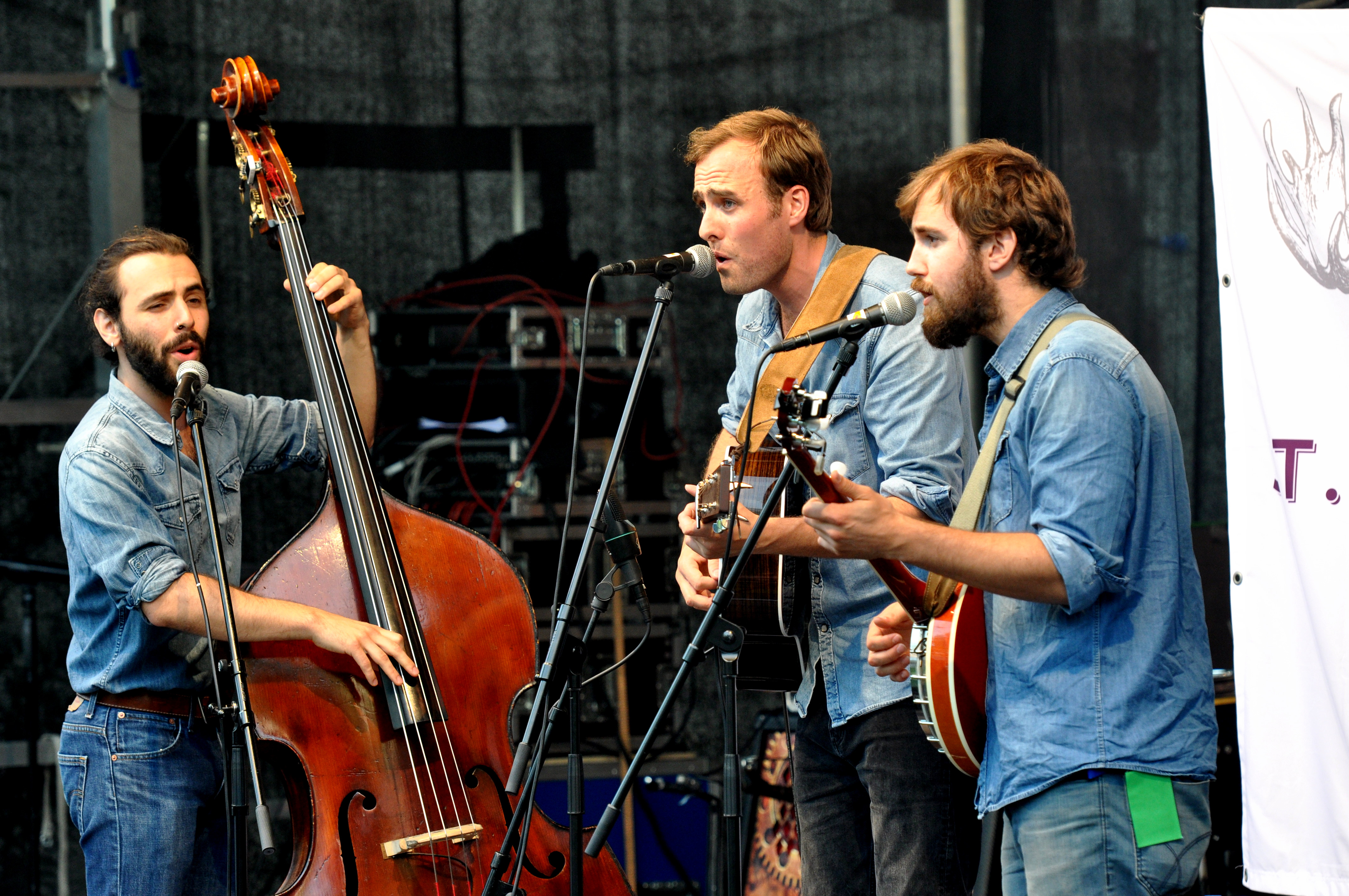
St. Beaufort performing live at Folk am Neckar Festival 2016

St. Beaufort is a two-piece folk band based in Berlin and Salzburg. The members are Henric Hungerhoff (guitar, accordion, vocals), Joseph Jakubczyk (banjo, guitar, vocals), with previous members including Derek Ullenboom (mandolin, vocals) and Tomás Peralta González (upright bass, vocals). Their style has been referred to as being influenced by bluegrass bands mixed with contemporary folk tunes. Both members are multi-instrumentalists.

== Overview ==
The band formed in 2013 when American Joseph Jakubczyk arrived in Berlin and met Henric Hungerhoff, then singer-songwriter of Hungerhoff & The Wild Roots. After playing shows together in local bars, the duo found Canadian musician Derek Ullenboom, who joined as a mandolin player. St. Beaufort released a self-titled album in 2015 that gained positive reviews from Berliner Morgenpost and Folker, followed by radio appearances on national radio Deutschlandradio, Radio Eins, and Radio Fritz. The group has played numerous tours and festivals across Europe, including Y Not Festival in England, Belladrum Tartan Heart Festival in Scotland, or Fano Free Folk Festival in Denmark. After Chilean bass player Tomás Peralta González joined St. Beaufort in 2016, Derek Ullenboom left the band to focus on his performing and songwriting work with Graham Candy. Further festival appearances include Blue Balls Festivals in Switzerland, Poole Beer & Bluegrass Festival, Wilde Möhre Festival, Bergfunk Open Air, Folk am Neckar, or the Rolling Stone Weekender.

St. Beaufort released a second album, "Trails & Guns" in 2018 and a third album, "Those Windows" in 2022. Following the release of their third studio album, St. Beaufort parted ways with Tomás Peralta due to touring difficulties brought on by the Covid pandemic and has been performing exclusively in a duo lineup since 2023.

The band also hosts an acoustic session named St. Beaufort's Table. For each episode, St. Beaufort invites guest musicians to play a song together at varying locations. Guests at St. Beaufort's Table have included HONIG, Jonathan Kluth and Charlotte Brandi of Me and My Drummer
