= The Toy Hearts =

English Bluegrass and Western Swing band

The Toy Hearts are an English bluegrass and western swing band from Birmingham.

The band is fronted by sisters Hannah and Sophia Johnson and released their first record in 2006. Its members are Stewart Johnson (Banjo, Dobro, Lap Steel) and his daughters Sophia (vocals, flatpicking guitar) and Hannah (lead vocals, Mandolin, songwriting).

They released "Femme Fatale" in October 2010, which was recorded in Nashville earlier that year.

== Discography ==
- If The Blues Comes Calling, WVR1 (2006)
- When I Cut Loose, WVR2 (2008)
- Femme Fatale, WVR3 (2010)
- Whiskey, WVR4 (2012)
