= Claire Lynch (musician) =

American bluegrass guitarist, singer, songwriter and producer (born 1954)

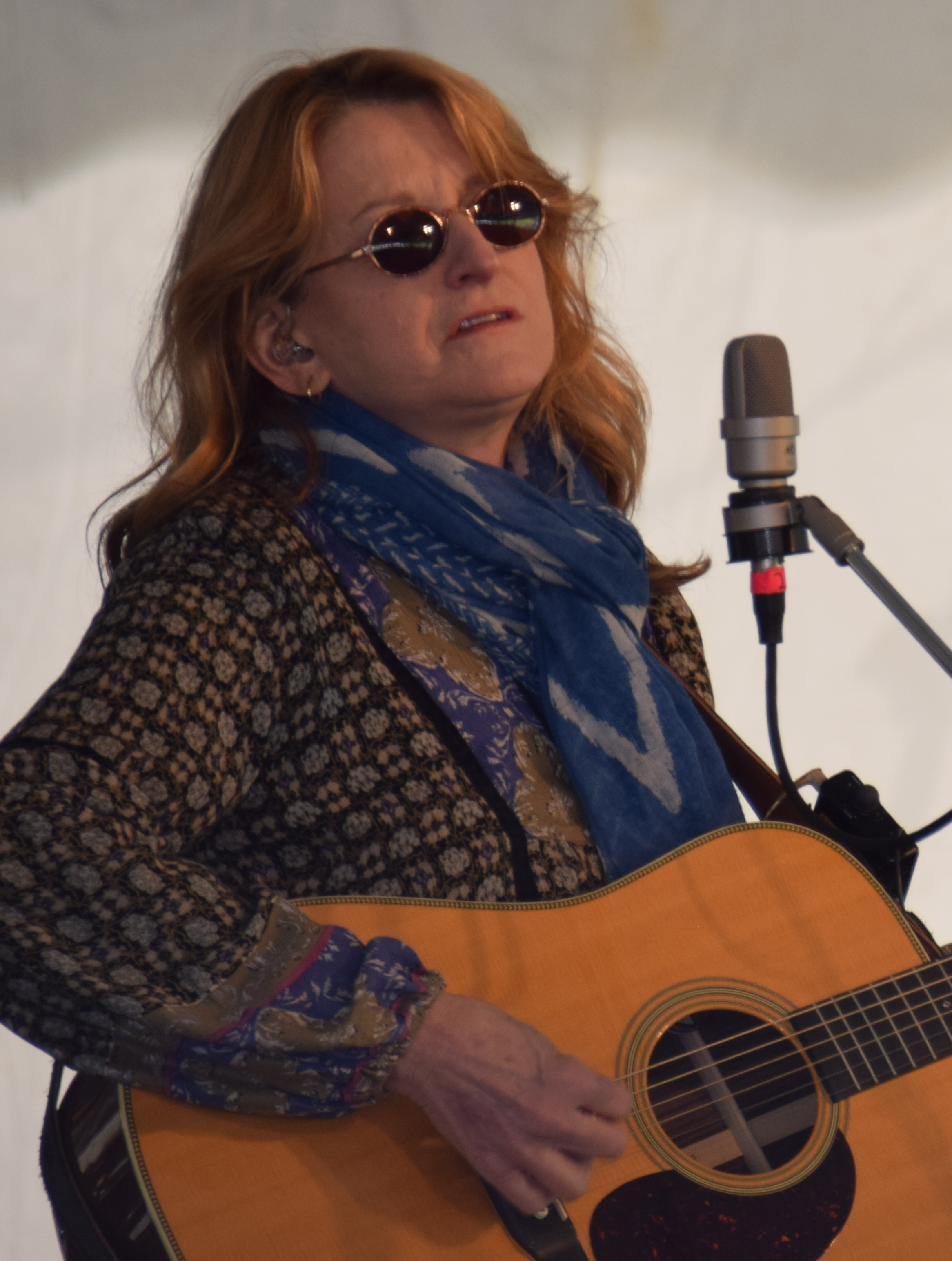
- Lynch at the Richmond Folk Festival in 2018

Background information
- Born: February 20, 1954 (age 72); Kingston, New York, U.S.
- Genres: Bluegrass
- Occupations: Singer-songwriter; musician; Record producer
- Instruments: Vocals; guitar
- Years active: 1977–present
- Labels: Rounder; Compass; Copper Creek
- Website: clairelynch.com

Claire Lynch (born February 20, 1954) is an American bluegrass musician, singer, songwriter, and producer. She is a three-time winner of the International Bluegrass Music Association's Female Vocalist of the Year honors. She is considered one of the two best female voices in bluegrass, a recognition she shares with Dale Ann Bradley.

== Early life ==
Lynch moved to Huntsville, Alabama from Kingston, New York, when she was 12 years old. She grew up in a musical family, with her mother playing the piano and her father singing. She had two sisters with whom she would sing, including doing trios at church. In high school, she spent time writing and recording songs.

== Career ==
Lynch's musical career transitioned during college when she became interested in bluegrass music. She joined a band called Hickory Wind, which eventually changed its name to the Front Porch String Band. Lynch played with the group until 1981, when it retired from the road. She then pursued a dual career of music and raising a family. The Front Porch String Band reunited in 1991, releasing the album Lines and Traces.

== Discography ==
| Title | Album details | Peak positions |
| Title | Album details | US Bluegrass |
|---|---|---|
| Breakin' It | Release date: 1982; Label: Ambush Records | — |
| Friends for a Lifetime | Release date: 1993; Label: Rounder Records | — |
| Moonlighter | Release date: 1995; Label: Rounder Records | — |
| Silver and Gold | Release date: August 5, 1997; Label: Rounder Records | — |
| Lovelight | Release date: April 11, 2000; Label: Rounder Records | — |
| Out in the Country | Release date: January 30, 2001; Label: Copper Creek Records | — |
| New Day | Release date: March 28, 2006; Label: Rounder Records | 11 |
| Crowd Favorites | Release date: October 9, 2007; Label: Rounder Records | 10 |
| Whatcha Gonna Do | Release date: August 25, 2009; Label: Rounder Records | — |
| Dear Sister | Release date: May 28, 2013; Label: Compass Records | 9 |
| North by South | Release date: September 16, 2016; Label: Compass Records | 5 |
"—" denotes releases that did not chart

== Awards and honors ==
Lynch has won numerous awards in her career, including being named the best female vocalist in 1997, 2010, and 2013 by the International Bluegrass Music Association. She also received a USA Walker Fellowship Award in 2012.

Three of Lynch's albums have been nominated for a Grammy in the Best Bluegrass Album category:

- Moonlighter (1995) was nominated at the 38th Annual Grammy Awards
- Silver and Gold (1997) was nominated at the 40th Annual Grammy Awards
- North By South (2016) was nominated at the 59th Annual Grammy Awards
