= Gibson F-5 =

1923 Gibson F-5 mandolin
(played by Bill Monroe)

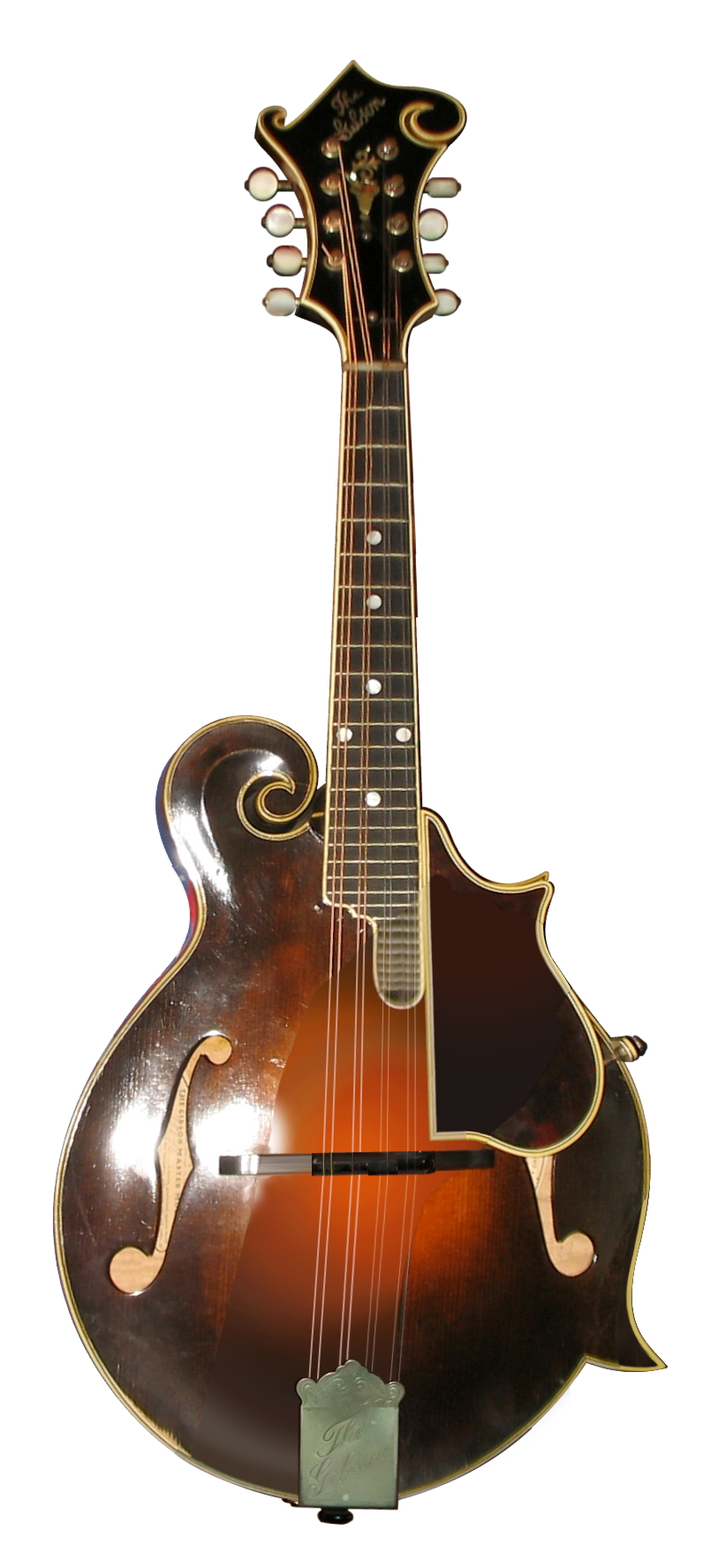
1924 Gibson F-5
(serial #75846)

The F-5 is a mandolin made by Gibson beginning in 1922. Some of them are referred to as Fern because the headstock is inlaid with a fern pattern. The F-5 became the most popular and most imitated American mandolin, and the best-known F-5 was owned by Bill Monroe, the father of bluegrass music, who in turn helped identify the F-5 as the ultimate bluegrass mandolin.

The F-5 was designed by Lloyd Loar, who signed all of them by date as long as he worked at Gibson—F-5s are thus identified as, for instance, "a July 9". The most famous of them all is one that he signed on July 9, 1923—the mandolin that ended up being Bill Monroe's instrument.
