= Lloyd Loar =

Mandolin designer and luthier

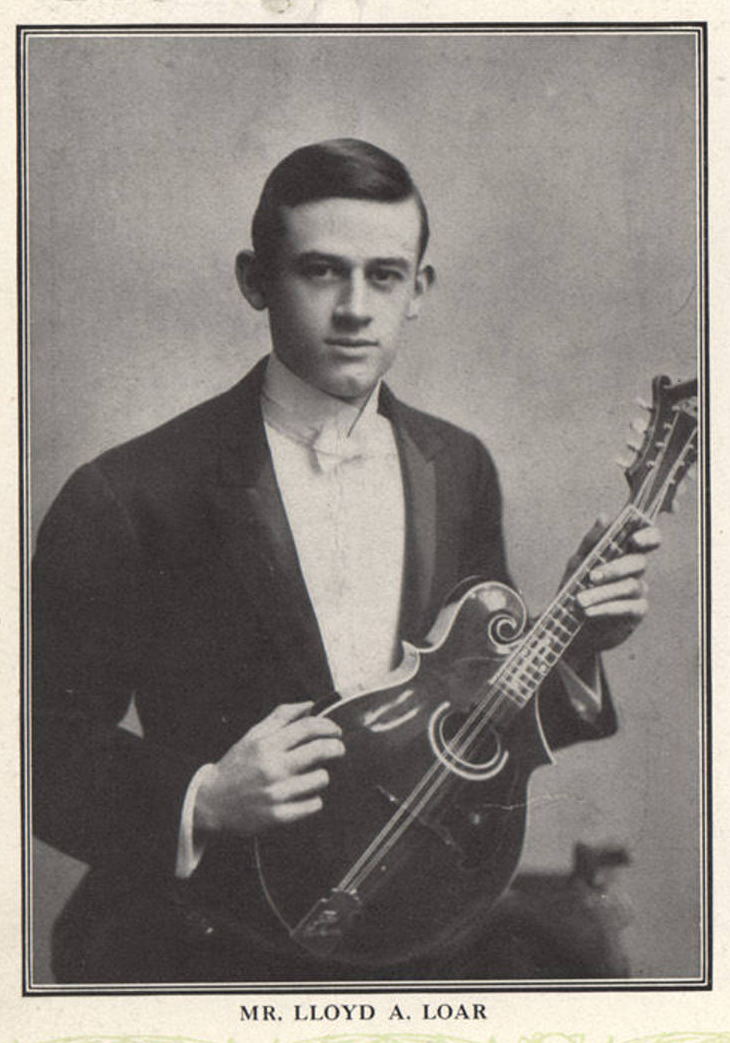
- Lloyd Loar, with Gibson F2 mandolin c. 1911
- Born: Lloyd Allayre Loar; January 9, 1886; Cropsey, Illinois, U.S.
- Died: September 14, 1943 (aged 57); Chicago, Illinois, U.S.
- Education: Chicago Musical College; American Conservatory of Music; Oberlin Conservatory of Music, -final year 1906; Opéra-Comique, Paris
- Occupations: Musician; composer; luthier; sound engineer; educator
- Years active: c. 1906-1943; Fisher Shipp Concert Company c.1906 - c. 1920; Gibson 1919-1924; Gulbranson Piano Company, Chicago; Northwestern University c. 1931-1943
- Known for: Music on mandolin, mandola, piano; musical instruments invented or perfected
- Notable work: F-5 mandolin; L-5 guitar; H-5 mandola; K-5 mandocello; A-5 mandolin
- Spouses: Fisher Shipp (1916-c.1935); Bertha Snyder (1939-1943)

Lloyd Allayre Loar (1886–1943) was an American musician, instrument designer and sound engineer. He is best known for his design work with the Gibson Mandolin-Guitar Mfg. Co. Ltd. in the early 20th century, including the F-5 model mandolin and L-5 guitar. In his later years he worked on electric amplification of stringed instruments, and demonstrated them around the country. One example, played in public in 1938 was an electric viola that used electric coils beneath the bridge, with no back, able to "drown out the loudest trumpet."

In 1898 Orville Gibson had patented a new kind of mandolin that followed violin design, with its curved top and bottom carved into shape, rather than pressed. The sides too were carved out of a single block of wood, rather than being made of bent wood strips. The instruments were already unique before Lloyd Loar came to work for Gibson. However, it is the Loar-designed instruments that became especially desirable. First made famous by Bill Monroe, Loar's signed mandolins today can cost as much as $200,000. The L-5 guitar owned by Maybelle Carter, which was made after he left Gibson, sold for $575,000.

Among the changes that Loar introduced was the f-hole instead of a round or oval sound-hole, another violin-family feature imported to the mandolin. He also "tuned" the tops of the instrument and the sound chamber (by removing bits of wood from sound bars and from the edges of the sound holes) so that the instrument's sound chamber was resonant to a particular note. Another change that Loar introduced to the Gibson line was a tone-producer, a circle of wood inside the instrument on the underside of the sound board that produced "overtones." His idea was to have a more complete set of these overtones with the carved top instruments. The result was an instrument that, like Stradivarius’ violins, has presented challenges to duplicate. Luthier-researchers such as Roger Siminoff have worked to understand the fine details. Gibsons' and Loar's mandolins were instrumental in displacing the round-backed instrument from the American market and influenced mandolins worldwide.

He also developed keyboard-stringed instruments. According to Roger Siminoff, he developed unique mechanisms to create sound. One plucked strings, the other struck metal reeds.

Loar was also a well-regarded musician on mandolin, viola, and musical saw. He traveled the United States and Europe in several musical groups. In one group, he performed with his future wife, Fisher Shipp. A surviving playbill shows that Loar performed in a chatauqua that also included a speech by William Jennings Bryan. Loar performed in many other groups that promoted the Gibson company, whose products Loar endorses in early Gibson catalogs.

Lloyd also taught at Northwestern University from 1930 to 1943, teaching vocal composition, advanced music theory and "The Physics of Music".

== History ==
Loar worked for Gibson from 1919 to 1924. His contributions include building the instrument top with F-shaped holes, like a violin; introducing a longer neck, thus moving the bridge closer to the center of the body; and floating the fingerboard over the top, a change from prior Gibson instruments that had fingerboards fused to the top. He also pioneered the use of the Virzi Tone Producer, a spruce disc suspended from the instrument top that acts as a supplemental soundboard.

It is not entirely clear why Loar was no longer employed by Gibson after 1924, although it may have had something to do with the 1923 departure of the man who hired Loar, Lewis Williams. As Vintage Guitar Magazine reported in a 2019 retrospective: "A great deal of speculation surrounds Lloyd’s departure from Gibson in December, 1924. There is nothing in the minutes from meetings of the board of directors to indicate strong disagreement. In fact, over his five years with the company, Loar is hardly mentioned. Evidence suggests he left quietly, and nobody really cared. Williams’ departure was followed by the hiring of Harry Ferris as general manager in 1923. He was fired in ’24. At the time, the company was dedicating more resources to banjo production, so the value of Loar’s presence ended with Williams. Loar’s attitude may have soured or he simply saw no reason to remain with Gibson."

According to A. R. Duchossoir, Loar designed experimental electric instruments while at Gibson. Loar's views on the importance of the development of electric instruments were supported by Lewis A Williams, one of the founders and major stockholders of Gibson as well as its secretary and general manager.

None of Loar's original electric instruments appear to have been preserved—but Walter A Fuller, who joined Gibson in 1933 and later became Gibson's chief electronic engineer, found some of Loar's original devices when he first set up his R&D lab in the mid-1930s. He claimed that Loar's electrics had electrostatic pickups, but because they exhibited very high impedance they were extremely susceptible to humidity. According to Fuller, the pickups were round, about the size of a silver dollar and had a piece of cork on the back, by which they were glued to the underside of the top of the instrument.

Duchossoir's book, Gibson Electrics, The Classic Years, features a photo of a Gibson L5, serial number 88258 of 1929 (after Loar left Gibson), one of the original Loar-designed L5s, with fitted electrostatic pickup and factory-fitted jack socket in the tailpiece.

Duchossoir also claims that Loar spent time at Gibson working on a 'quasi-solid body' electric double bass, and that according to this instrument and several patents filed by Loar between the mid-1920s and the mid-1930s, he worked on pickups that were electromagnetic in nature.

According to Duchossoir, Lewis Williams was replaced as general manager, and a lack of amicable relations with the new manager—an accountant named Guy Hart—led to the termination of Loar's contract. After leaving Gibson, Loar created and patented an electric instrument with a coil pickup, and co-founded the Acousti-Lectric company with Lewis Williams in 1934. The company was renamed the Vivi-Tone company in 1936. Loar died in 1943.

== Famous Loar mandolins ==
1923 Gibson F-5 mandolin (played by Bill Monroe)

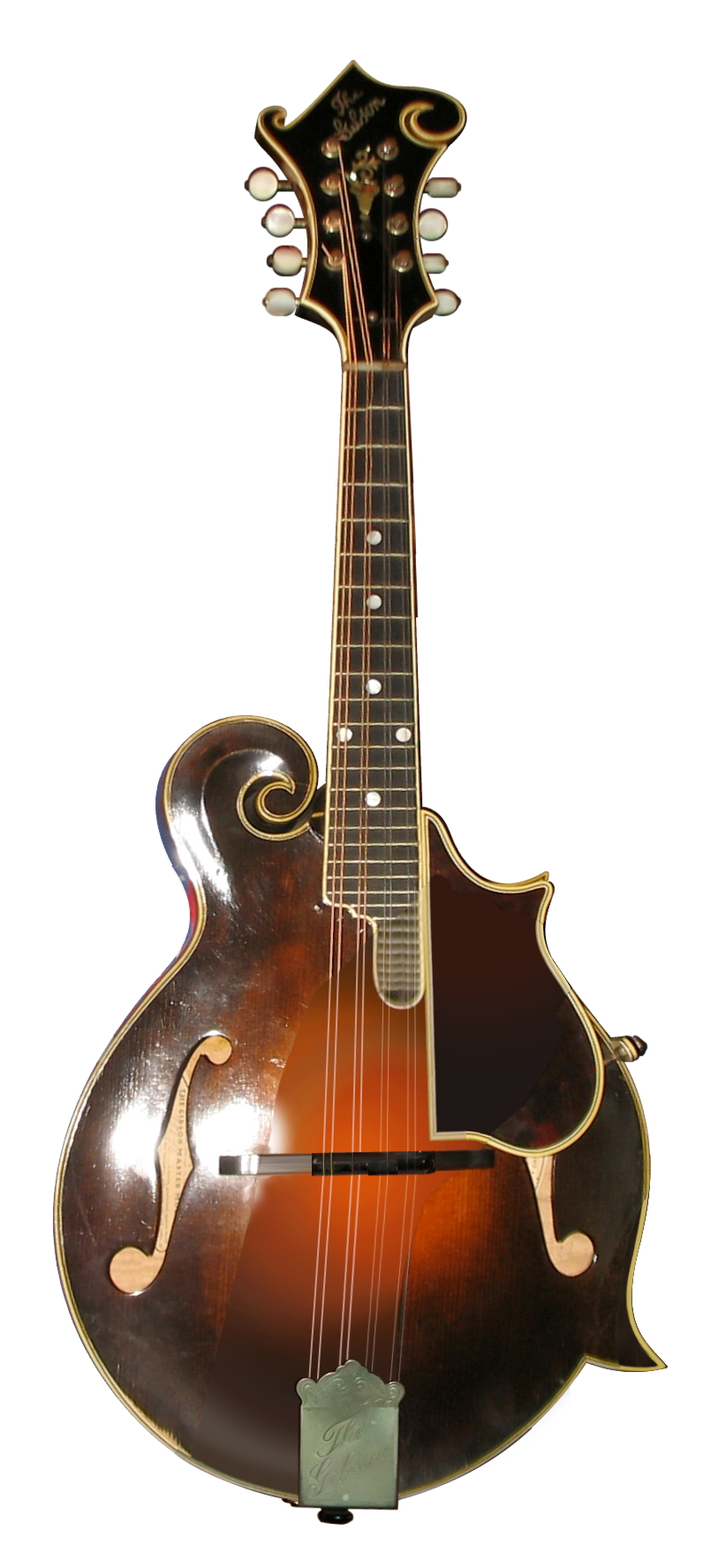
1924 Gibson F-5
(serial #75846)

The F5 model was made famous by the founder of bluegrass, Bill Monroe. Monroe played a Gibson F5 model serial number 73987 signed by Loar on July 9, 1923, for most of his career. This mandolin can be viewed in the Country Music Hall of Fame in Nashville, where it now resides in their collections.

Loar also signed a rare subset of F5 mandolins called Ferns, of which approximately twenty are known to exist. The name refers to the distinctive fern inlay design of the peghead. The earliest documented Fern bears the serial number 73755, dated July 9, 1923, the same signing date as Bill Monroe's famous Loar. This is the only known Fern built without the "Virzi" Tone Producer, a secondary sound board suspended underneath the mandolin's top inside the sound chamber. This particular instrument is the only known Fern dated on 9 July.

In 2007, mandolinist Chris Thile acquired a 1924 Loar-signed F5 serial # 75316 that was an exceedingly rare find, as it was in virtually new condition. It reportedly cost him around $200,000. Thile also owns serial # 75318, while John Paul Jones of Led Zeppelin owns the mandolin between the two, serial # 75317. Other well-known musicians who have owned Loar-signed F5's include Mike Marshall, David McLaughlin, Herschel Sizemore, Alan Bibey, Tony Williamson, David Grisman, John Reischman, Tom Rozum, Frank Wakefield, Ricky Skaggs and the late Joe Val serial #72207.

Only one A-style mandolin, a Gibson A5, is known to have been signed by Loar. It has been widely copied, originally by mandolin maker Bob Givens. The Loar A5 was found by Tut Taylor and sold to a Southern California bluegrass musician in 1974.

Mr. Taylor originally acquired the A5 from the sister of Dr. William B. Griffith, of the Griffith School of Music in Atlanta, Georgia. Dr. Griffith's wife, also a teacher at the school, reportedly requested an F5 in a body style without points. Her request resulted in the production of the Loar A5 in 1923.

=== Collectability ===
Loar expert Darryl Wolfe maintains an F5 historical journal. As of January, 2010 he has documented 228 Loar-signed F5 mandolins of the 326 that are believed to have been made. In 2023 the value of a Loar-signed mandolin was estimated at $100,000 to $175,000 depending on condition.

== L-5 Guitar ==
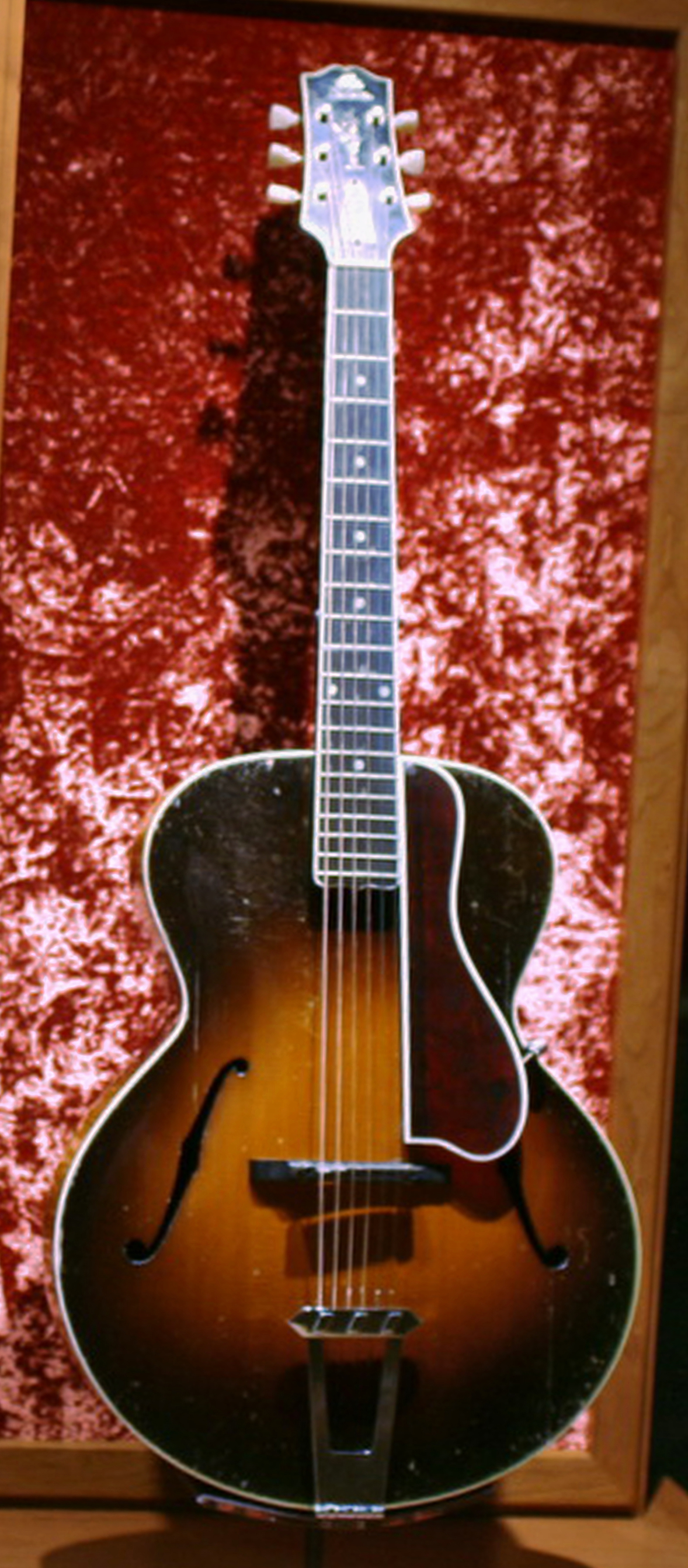
Gibson L-5 guitar (played by Maybelle Carter), "the most important single guitar in the entire history of country music," according to George Gruhn. There is controversy about its date. Commonly said to be a 1928 instrument, but researcher Joe Spann concluded, it couldn't have left the factory earlier than April 1929, and was shipped January, 1930.

The Gibson L-5 guitar was first produced in 1922 by the Gibson Guitar Corporation, then of Kalamazoo, Michigan, under the direction of master luthier Lloyd Loar, and has been in production ever since. It was considered the premier guitar of the company during the big band era. It was originally offered as an acoustic instrument, with electric models not made available until the 1940s.

=== Design and construction ===
Worldwide, the L-5 was one of the first guitars to feature f-holes. Then as well as today, the construction of the L-5 is similar in construction, carving, bracing and tap-tuning, to building a cello. This guitar as well as the cello are similarly designed in order to amplify and project the acoustic vibration of strings throughout carved and tuned woods, using f-holes as the projection points. From 1922 to 1934 the L-5 was produced with a 16" lower bout width. In 1934 the lower bout was increased to 17" - and this width is still used today. Also released in 1934 was the one-inch larger 18" archtop guitar named the "L5 Super" which a couple of years later was renamed the Gibson Super 400. These two master-built acoustic guitars are Gibson's top-of-the-line carved wood and highly ornate archtop instruments. These guitars cannot be constructed quickly and require unusual attention to detail, resulting in a higher price. The time, skilled workmanship and materials used in these builds has been delivered non-stop for the past 90+ years. Since the 1930s there have been several other 17" archtops designed by Gibson, including variations introduced as more affordable, less ornately decorated models - these were introduced to consider the budgets of musicians.

== Bibliography ==
- Sparks, Paul (2003). The Classical Mandolin. Oxford: Oxford University Press. ISBN 9780195173376.
- Duchossoir, A.R. (2008). Gibson Electrics - The Classic Years. Milwaukee, WI: Hal Leonard. ISBN 978-1-4768-5126-6. (e-book), ISBN 978-0-7935-9210-4 (paperback).
