= Festival of the Bluegrass =

Music festival in Kentucky, United States

- Genre: bluegrass music
- Locations: Kentucky Horse Park; Lexington, Kentucky
- Years active: 1974 to present
- Founders: Bob and Jean Cornett
- Website: www.festivalofthebluegrass.com

The Festival of the Bluegrass, located in Lexington, Kentucky, was the oldest bluegrass music festival in the bluegrass region of Kentucky. The festival took place the first full weekend of June each year from 1974 until 2019. The Festival of the Bluegrass helped shape the early bluegrass festival culture.

The Cornett family of Georgetown, Kentucky, began the festival in 1974 with The Festival of the Bluegrass, which was named by Raymond K. McLain. The first festival stage was a farm wagon with a tarp for shelter. The fans also used a tarp as shelter from the terrible thunderstorms the first day of the festival. This first festival was held on Walnut Hall Farm, part of which is now the Kentucky Horse Park on the north side of Lexington. Later the festival was moved to Masterson Station Park, a Lexington city park, for initially two years. However, the festival did not move back to the Horse Park until the seventeenth year, by which time the Horse Park was fully developed with a suitable campground. The annual event was a traditional bluegrass festival dedicated to preserving bluegrass music.

After 1998, the festival consisted of three stages of music and incorporated a music camp designed to teach bluegrass music to school-age children. In 2007 the festival received the International Bluegrass Music Association's Event of the Year award.

In 2013, the weekend Festival of the Bluegrass followed up a weeklong celebration in Lexington, "Best of Bluegrass".

Founder Jean Cornett died in 2015. Bob Cornett died in 2019.

The festival was cancelled in 2020 due to the COVID-19 pandemic. The festival never resumed after the 2019 event. The Spirit in the Bluegrass Festival, organized by Kentucky natives Sam Karr and Rick Greene, was held at the Kentucky Horse Park in June, 2023 with the support of the Cornett family.

== See also ==
- List of bluegrass music festivals
- List of country music festivals
