= Podunk (disambiguation) =

Podunk is a term used in the United States to represent an insignificant place.

Podunk may also refer to:

- Podunk people, an Algonquian-language, Eastern Woodlands group of Native Americans

== Places in the United States ==
- Podunk, New York, a hamlet
- Denver Harbor, Houston, nicknamed Podunk, an area of Houston, Texas
- Poeville, Nevada, nicknamed Podunk, a ghost town
- Podunk, an area near East Brookfield, Massachusetts
- Podunk River, a stream in Hartford County, Connecticut

== Music ==
- Podunk (band), a Texas rock band
- "Podunk" (song), by Keith Anderson, 2006
- "Podunk", a song by Foo Fighters, a B-side of the single "This Is a Call"
- Podunk Bluegrass Festival, an annual bluegrass festival in East Hartford, Connecticut, US

== Video games ==
- Podunk, a fictional town in the video game Secret of Evermore
- Podunk, a fictional town in the 1990 localization of the 1989 Japanese video game Mother
