= The McLain Family Band =

American bluegrass band

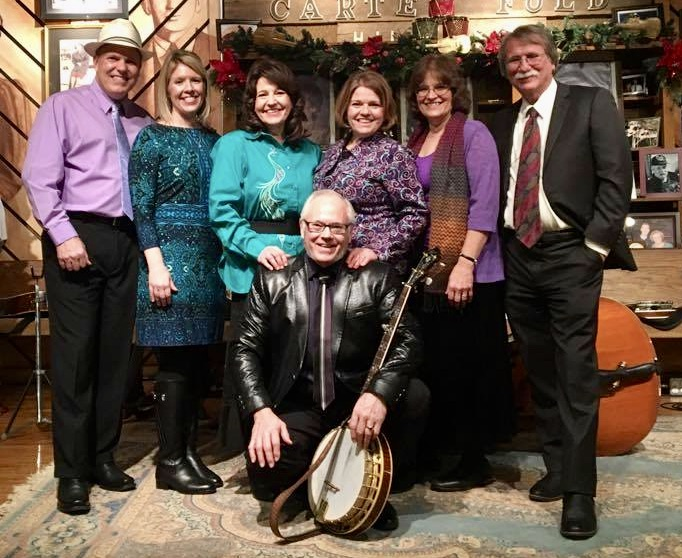
- At the Carter Family Fold on January 7, 2017

Background information
- Also known as: Bluegrass State
- Origin: Hindman, Kentucky, US
- Genres: Bluegrass; classical
- Years active: 1968–present
- Label: Country Life Records
- Spinoffs: The McLains; Michael and Jennifer McLain; Al, Alice & Ruth
- Members: Raymond Winslow McLain; Alice McLain White; Al White; Ruth McLain Smith; Daxson Lewis; Nancy Ann Wartman; Michael McLain; Jennifer McLain
- Past members: Raymond Kane McLain; Michael Riopel; Beverly Buchanan; Tom Owen
- Website: mclainfamilyband.com

The McLain Family Band is an American bluegrass band founded in Hindman, Kentucky, in 1968.

Raymond Kane McLain studied folk music at university, and began playing bluegrass music with his then-three children in the late 1950s. They formalized their group in 1968, and played for WKYH-TV before moving to Berea, Kentucky. In the years since, the group has played in 50 U.S. states, at renowned venues across the US, and on nationwide television. Initially sponsored by the United States Department of State, the McLains performed in 63 total nations. From 1978 through 1987, the band hosted an annual family-friendly bluegrass festival in Bighill, Kentucky.

The McLain Family Band developed their sound by ear, with only their patriarch having been classically trained. Music reviewers and ambassadors of the United States alike spoke of the band's authenticity and heartfelt approach to music. In 2013, the International Bluegrass Music Association awarded the McLain Family Band with their Distinguished Achievement Award.

Some McLain songs are originals, some are bluegrass and country music standards, and some were specifically commissioned classical pieces: the first bluegrass band to combine those genres. The core of the band has always been the progeny of Raymond K. McLain, but the group has expanded and contracted over the years. Some members have worked on their own projects when the family band wasn't touring; at least a half-dozen albums attest to that.

== History ==
=== Formation ===
Dr. Raymond Francis McLain (1904 or 1905 – May 2, 1981) was president of Eureka College, Transylvania University, and the American University in Cairo during his career in academia, while his wife Beatrice "Bicky" Kane McLain (1906–2004) was the director of the Center for Southern Regional Folklife Studies at the University of Alabama (1966–1976). Raymond Francis and Bicky had two children: daughter Rosemary (a "singer/songwriter and artistic pioneer in the rubber stamping industry"), and son Raymond Kane McLain (1928–2003).

Raymond Kane combined the passions of his parents; he majored in music theory at Denison University, studied at the John C. Campbell Folk School, and did graduate work in folk music studies at Harvard University and the University of North Carolina before moving to Hindman, Kentucky in 1954 where he became the director of Hindman Settlement School. While at Hindman, Raymond Kane developed an interest in bluegrass music; he introduced his three eldest children—Raymond Winslow, Alice, and Ruth—to the genre, and the four of them began playing together.

Raymond Kane married Betty Winslow in 1952, and founded the band at her encouragement in 1968. Initially performing under the name Bluegrass State, the quartet performed on a weekly WKYH-TV television show for two years. On December 31, 1968, the family's Hindman home burned to the ground; all seven family members and their instruments survived, and in 1970, the family moved to Berea, Kentucky.

=== Performing ===
The band performed in all 50 U.S. states, and particularly in Alaska during the winters where "people really needed music." In 1980, Alaska Airlines sponsored the McLain Family Festival (January 11–12); inside West Anchorage High School, away from the −40 °F (−40 °C) weather, the family was joined on stage by the Anchorage Symphony Orchestra and future McLain band member Michael Riopel. On the mainland, the band also stood before audiences at the Speed Art Museum, Carnegie Hall, the 1982 World's Fair, the Lincoln Center, the John F. Kennedy Center for the Performing Arts (at least six times), and the Carter Family Fold (since 1974). They also appeared on the CBS Morning News, the Grand Ole Opry, Hee Haw, The Johnny Cash Show, Music City Tonight, Nashville Now, Today, and their own weekly program on WKYT-TV.

Nations outside the US that hosted MFB performances

After the McLain Family Band played for the National Endowment for the Arts' music committee in 1972, Gian Carlo Menotti was so "charmed by the band" that he invited them to that year's Festival dei Due Mondi in Spoleto, Italy. That July, the band undertook their first international concert tour sponsored by the United States Department of State, traveling to Italy, West Germany, and Belgium. The band made 14 overseas tours—including an "around-the-world odyssey in 1975", and has performed in 64 different countries, including:

- Afghanistan (1975)
- Austria (1974)
- Belgium (1972)
- Bolivia (1976)
- Brazil (1976)
- Burma (1975)
- Cameroon
- Canada
- Chad
- Chile (1976)
- Colombia (1976)
- Czechoslovakia (1975)
- Denmark (2018)
- Ecuador (1976)
- Egypt (1975)
- Finland (1974)
- France (1975)
- West Germany (1972)
- Guatemala (1976)
- Haiti (1976)
- Hungary (1974 & 75)
- Iceland (1974)
- India (1975)
- Indonesia (1975)
- Iran (1975)
- Ireland (2018)
- Italy (1972)
- Japan (1975)
- Laos (1975)
- Lebanon (1975)
- Mexico
- Nepal (1975)
- Norway (1974)
- Paraguay (1976)
- Peru (1976)
- Philippines (1975)
- Poland (1975)
- Romania (1974 & 75)
- Spain (1974)
- Suriname (1976)
- Sweden (1974)
- Taiwan
- Tunisia (1975)
- Uruguay (1976)
- Venezuela (1976)
- North Yemen
- Yugoslavia

The band stopped extensively touring in 1990 to allow Raymond Winslow, Alice and Al, and Ruth to personally rear their children without being on the road for months at a time. In 2018, for their 50th anniversary, the band toured widely again through the US and Europe.

=== Festival ===
McLain Family Band Festival
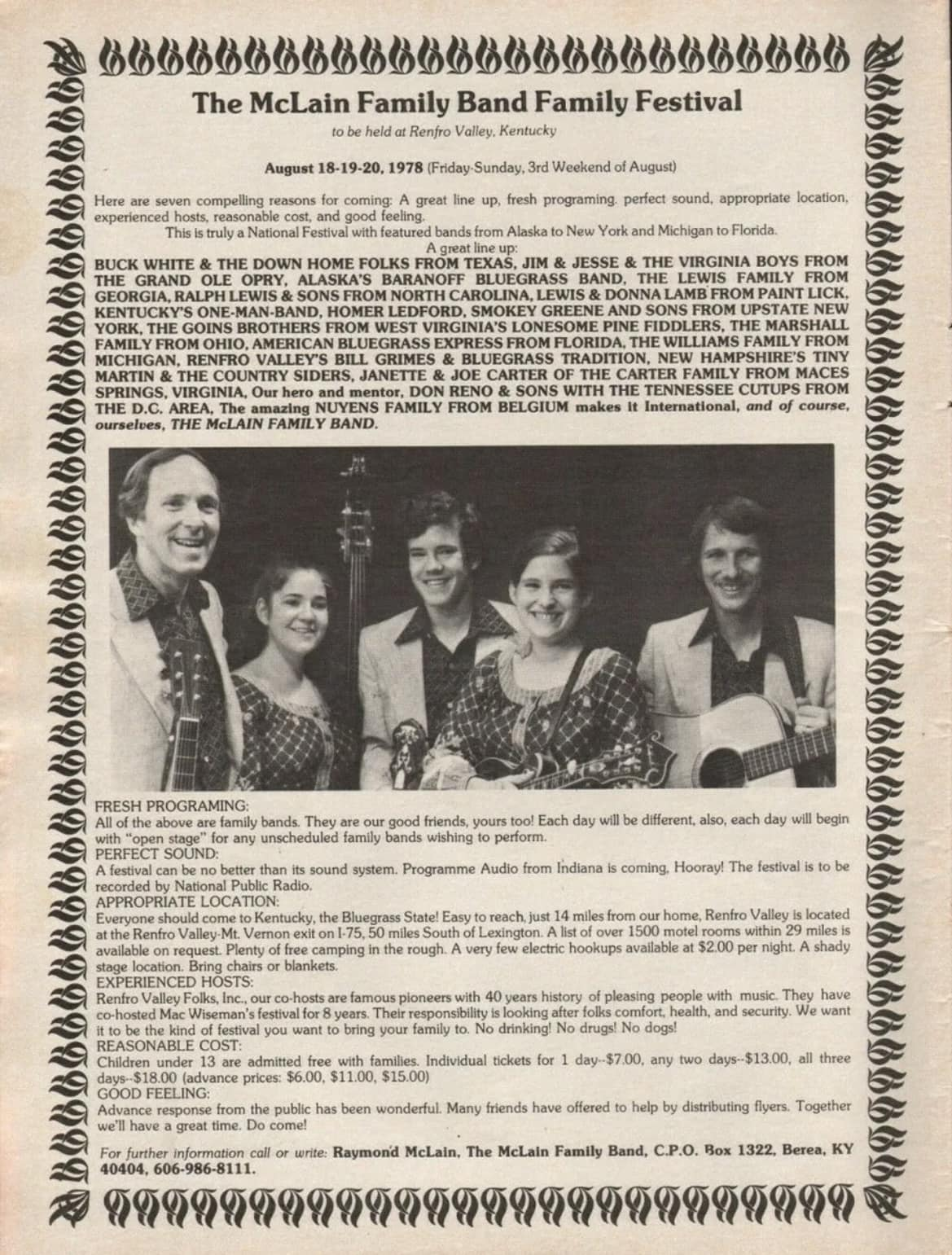
- Promotional flyer for inaugural festival
- Genre: Bluegrass
- Locations: Renfro Valley, KY, US (1978); Bighill, KY, US (1979–1987)
- Years active: 1978–1987
- Founders: Raymond Kane McLain
- Attendance: 6,000–7,000 annually

Raymond Kane had envisioned for years a family-friendly bluegrass festival dedicated to performing family groups, and in 1978 he found a 73-acre (30 ha) farm on U.S. Route 421 in Bighill, Kentucky that perfectly met the needs of such a festival: "I found this farm with this marvelous hill forming a natural amphitheater. At the bottom of the hill is a grove of locust, wild plum and oak trees, a great backdrop for the stage. The rest is history." That year, the band hosted the inaugural McLain Family Band Festival in Renfro Valley, Kentucky, but all subsequent festivals were held on the farm.

The festival showcased both domestic (including Patsy Montana, The Whites, Jim & Jesse, Janette Carter, and the Osborne Brothers) and international talent (including the Appleseeds from Japan, the Nuyens Family from Belgium, and Fesaci from Czechoslovakia). Some years, the festival's performers were broadcast on NPR and Kentucky Educational Television. Between 6,000 and 7,000 people attended the festival each year, many of whom camped on the McLain's farm for the duration. No alcoholic drinks or illegal drugs were allowed on the premises. In 1987, the entrance fee was US$10 (equivalent to $28.34 in 2025); the festival ran for three days from noon to 11 p.m., and ultimately lasted for ten years.

== McLain music ==
While Raymond Kane was classically trained, his children were taught and learned to play by ear. The band watched videos of their performances to find weaknesses and continually improve: "[Raymond Kane] said that we should be able to play a piece three consecutive times with no mistakes if it was ready to perform."

The McLain Family Band's music has been reviewed as being "'cheery,' 'light,' and 'wholesome'", and lacking the painful, "dark and haunted side of bluegrass". George Vecsey noted in 1975 that "[u]nlike many bands, the McLains do little talking, and they minimize their fancy solos." The band performs music of their own composition, as well as "bluegrass and country standards, novelty songs, and eastern Kentucky traditional music." Many of their songs are written by Raymond Kane's sister, Rosemary. The McLain Family Band also played with symphonic orchestras, presenting pieces arranged by Phillip Rhodes, Newton Wayland, and P. D. Q. Bach (the fictional alter-ego of Peter Schickele). All band members sing both lead and harmony.

In the late 1970s, the McLain Family Band pioneered combining bluegrass and classical music, the first bluegrass band to do so. In 1973, composer Phillip Rhodes wrote Concerto for Bluegrass Band and Orchestra for the McLain Family Band, the first "major work ever written for a bluegrass band and symphony orchestra." The McLain Family Band has performed it "hundreds of times with orchestras from all over the [United States]." Rhodes also composed orchestral arrangements of original McLain Family Band songs under a commission by the Cincinnati Symphony Orchestra.

One of the band's most-requested pieces is "Kentucky Wind", a song written by Raymonds K. and W. while homesick during a South American tour. Another is "Troublesome Creek", by Raymond W. about a waterway in Hindman; the song is like the creek, "sometimes, it is a placid stream, a place to catch tadpoles and crayfish. But other times, it is troublesome, a rising torrent threatening to flood houses."

Over the years, the McLain Family Band has repeatedly said that they play because they enjoy doing it. Raymond Kane once said, "People pay us to leave our homes, to ride in a van for hours, to set up our instruments...but they don't pay us to play music. We do that for fun. The minute we stop enjoying that, we'll do something else."

=== Discography ===
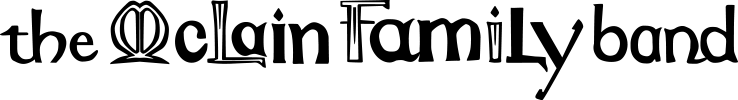
Logo for McLain Family Band albums and ancillary materials

Under their own label (Country Life Records), the McLain Family Band released 14 LP records.

On the Road

- Released: 1976
- Format: LP record
- Label: Country Life
- Tracks: "New River Train" (Traditional) · "Old Maid Song" (McLain) · "Lonesome Day" (Traditional) · "Pretty Little Reckless Boy" (Traditional) · "If You're Ever Gonna Love Me" (Buck Graves and Leroy Mack) · "A Heavenly Song" (McLain) · "On the Road" (McLain) · "Jump Josie" (Traditional) · "Believe Me" (McLain) · "Brown Eyed Baby" (Stovall) · "Big River Blues" (Delmore) · "Can't We Get Together Once Again?" (McLain)

Celebrate Life

- Released: 2016

== Members ==
The initial four members of the McLain Family Band were Raymond Kane and his first three children: Raymond Winslow, Alice, and Ruth. Over the years, band membership expanded to include Raymond Kane's youngest two children Nancy Ann and Michael, Alice's husband Al White, and Ruth's husband Michael Riopel. At times, the group also featured Raymond Winslow's wife Beverly Buchanan and non-relative Tom Owen. Raymond Kane's wife, and mother of the five McLain children—Betty—was the band's business and talent manager.

As of December 2018, the McLain Family Band lineup included Raymond Winslow McLain, Alice McLain and Al White, Ruth McLain Smith, and Daxson Lewis, occasionally joined by Nancy Ann Wartman, Michael McLain, and Jennifer McLain.

=== Raymond Kane and Betty ===
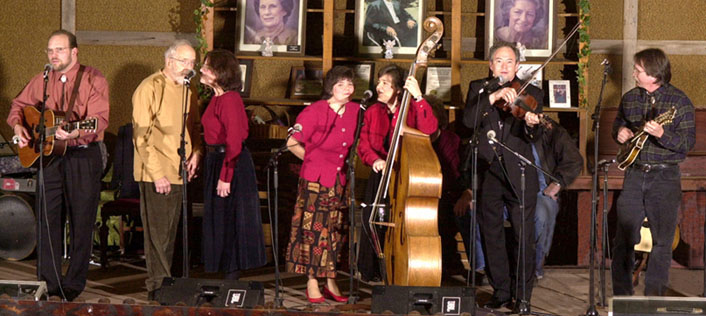
Raymond Kane (second from left) performing with the band at the Carter Fold on September 28, 2002

Raymond Kane McLain was born on April 18, 1928, in Alliance, Ohio. In 1970, Raymond Kane began teaching the United States' first university-level courses in bluegrass and Appalachian music at Berea College. Raymond Kane McLain was the bandleader of the group for 20 years. He sang and played the guitar and accordion. Raymond Kane also wrote music; the Elizabethton Star called his arrangement of Johann Sebastian Bach's second Brandenburg Concerto "the most stunning" of his musical compositions for the band. After the band stopped touring in 1989, Raymond Kane became a librarian. He died in Lexington, Kentucky on February 14, 2003, at 74 years old.

Mary Elizabeth "Betty" Winslow (1928–2011) had a degree in psychology from Oberlin College, and married Raymond Kane in 1952. After they moved to Hindman, Kentucky, she became the recreation director of the Hindman Settlement School. It was with her encouragement that Raymond Kane started the family band in 1968. For "over 20 years" she managed the band full-time—acting as talent manager and bookkeeper at home in Berea, Kentucky while the band toured—and also hosted the band's annual Bighill, Kentucky bluegrass festival. She taught English country dance, and was an executive field director for the Wilderness Road Girl Scout Council. She was married to Bill Tallmadge from 1999 until his death in 2004.

=== Raymond Winslow ===
Raymond Winslow McLain was born in 1953. He enrolled at Berea College when the family moved there in 1970, and married Beverly Buchanan in December 1979. In 2000, Raymond Winslow was made the director of the Bluegrass and Country Music Program at East Tennessee State University. As of 2017, he was the executive director of Morehead State University's Kentucky Center for Traditional Music.

A high tenor playing clawhammer banjo, and fiddle, Raymond Winslow is the most well-known of the McLain family outside of the band, and one of "the most well-traveled musicians in his field". Playing with the family band, Raymond Winslow "took nearly all the lead breaks in their early years." He was a "musical ambassador" for the United States Department of State, and made more than 230 appearances with orchestras. Paul Jenkins of Bluegrass Unlimited called Raymond Winslow's playing virtuosic, and in 1972, he won a Bluegrass Music Award.

After the family band stopped touring in 1989, Raymond Winslow joined Jim & Jesse and played with them for 10 years. During those ten years, he also released two albums of his own: A Place of My Own (1992) and Kentucky Mountain Banjo (1995). Since then, he's also played with "Canadian harmonica virtuoso" Mike Stevens.

A Place of My Own

- Released: 1992
- Format: Cassette tape, compact disc
- Label: Flying Fish
- Tracks: "On the Road" (Raymond W. McLain) · "A Place of My Own" (Michael and Raymond W. McLain) · "Cotton Eyed Joe" (Traditional) · "Silver Creek" (Raymond W. McLain) · "Windswept" (Raymond W. McLain) · "Wild Fiddler's Rag" (Howard Forrester) · "The Bells of St. Mary's" · "Raymond's Breakdown" (Raymond W. McLain) · "Cannon Ball Blues" (A. P. Carter) · "Kitten on the Keys" (Zez Confrey) · "Ain't Gonna Work Tomorrow" (Charlie and Ira Louvin) · "Shuckin' the Corn" (Buck Graves, Gladys Stacey, and Louise Certain) · "Maiden's Prayer" (James and Bob Wills)

Kentucky Mountain Banjo

- Released: 1995
- Format: Compact disc

=== Alice and Al White ===
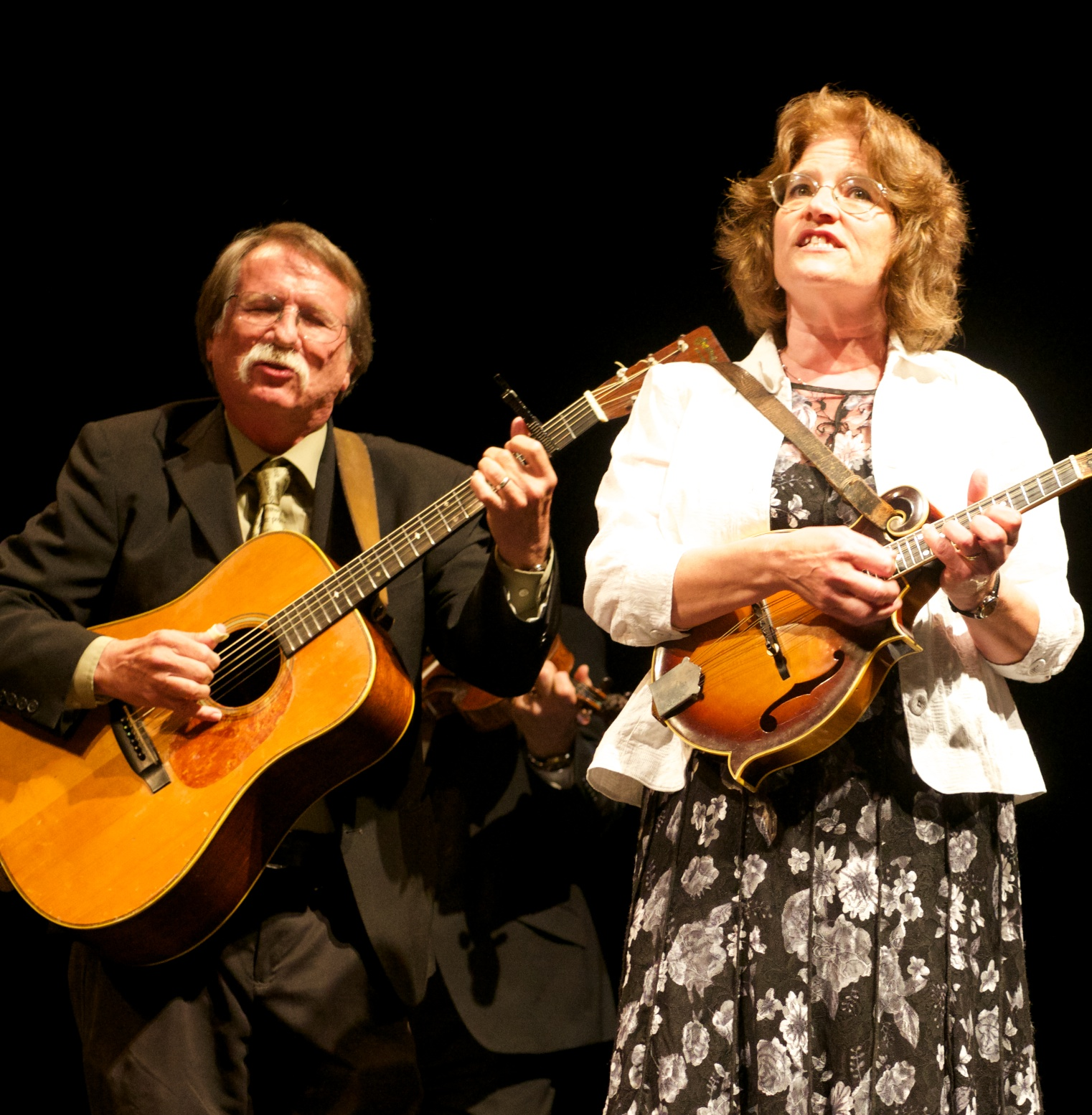
Al (left) and Alice White in 2014

Alice McLain White (b. Rose Alice McLain in 1956) sings, and plays mandolin and double bass. She enrolled at Berea College when the family moved there in 1970. She met her husband Al on the Grand Ole Opry before they married in 1977. Al White (b. 1952) grew up playing music in New Mexico, and moved to Louisville, Kentucky to join the band Bluegrass Alliance. Al joined the McLain Family Band after marrying Alice; he plays mandolin and guitar, and sings.

When the McLain Family Band stopped performing in 1989, Alice and Al remained in Berea, Kentucky. There, as of 2017, Alice was a first-grade teacher, Al taught traditional instrument instruction at Berea College, and the two of them played concerts and for folk and contra dancing.

=== Ruth ===
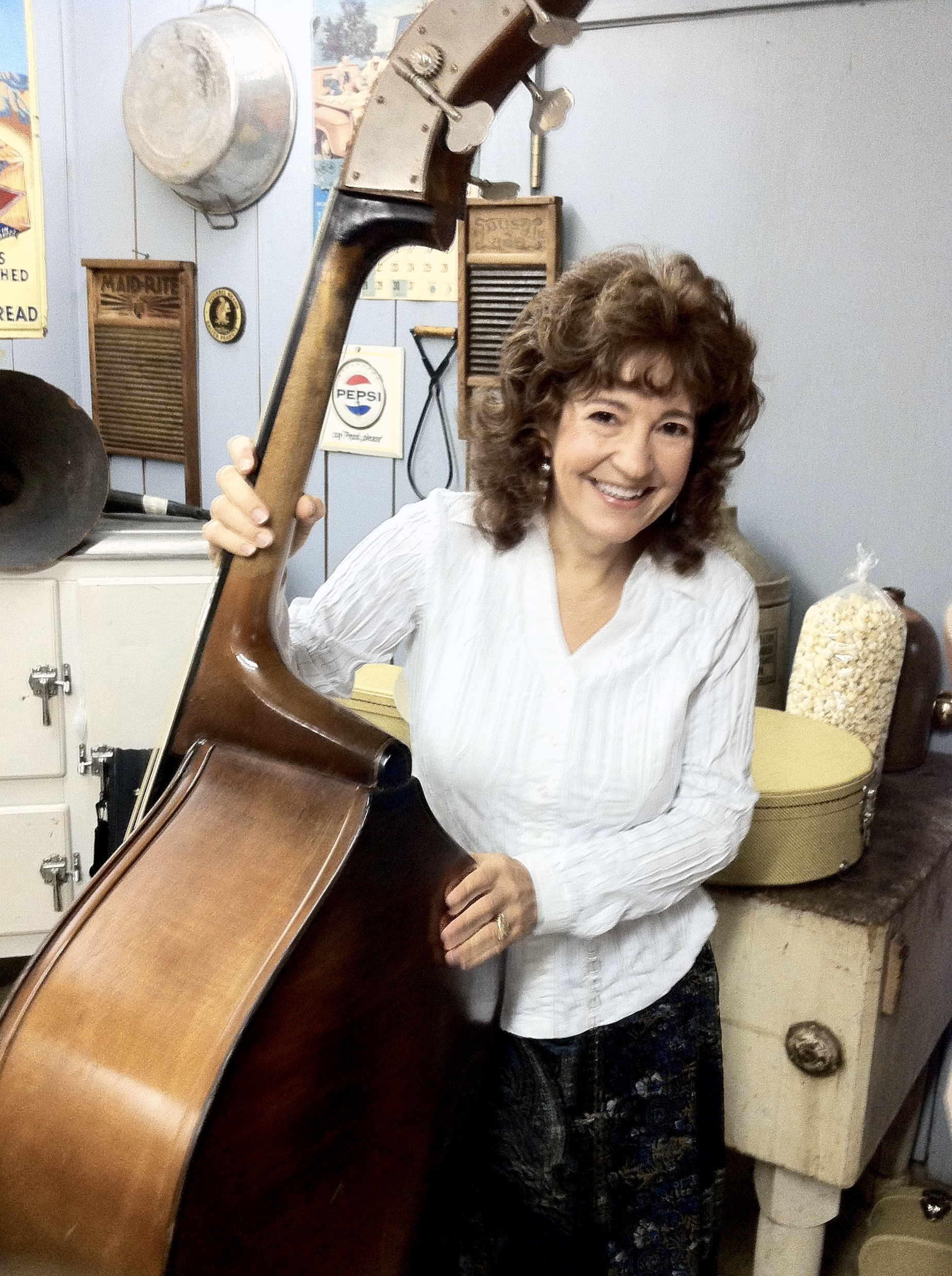
Ruth McLain Smith at the Museum of Appalachia (2010)

Ruth McLain Smith (b. Ruth Helen McLain in 1958) plays mandolin, double bass, and sings. When the band formed in 1968, she stood on chairs and milk crates to reach the neck of her bass. On December 15, 1970, she played the Appalachian dulcimer for the White House on national television after only 2–6 weeks of learning the instrument. In 2007, Ruth was playing regularly with Grandpa Jones' family. She has a Bachelor of Arts from Berea College, and by 2016, was a lecturer of music education at Morehead State University (MSU). Still teaching at MSU in 2023, she was nominated by the International Bluegrass Music Association as their mentor of the year, an award that "honors a bluegrass professional who has impacted the lives and careers of newcomers to the bluegrass industry."

Outside of music, in 2007, Ruth was a director with Usborne Publishing, having been with the company since 1995. Prior to 2007, she married Philip Smith, and they have four children; in 2011, she moved back to Berea, Kentucky to care for her mother, Betty.

=== Nancy Ann and Michael ===
Nancy Ann McLain Wartman was born in 1965, had joined the band by 1979, and performs on double bass, mandolin, and vocals. Nancy Ann joined up with Usborne Publishing in 1994 and held the position of director within the company as of September 2016.

Michael, who was born in 1967, plays banjo, guitar, and mandolin. He has played with the Claire Lynch Band and Dale Ann Bradley, and he married his wife Jennifer a week after proposing atop the Crowne Plaza in Nashville, Tennessee. As of April 2014, Michael taught bluegrass and traditional instruments at Belmont University.

=== Others ===
Tom Owen had joined the band by 1979, and played banjo, guitar, and mandolin. He was not related to the McLains.

A band member by May 1981, Michael Riopel (b. 1954 or 1955) married Ruth and played guitar, mandolin, and harmonica.

Raymond Kane's mother, Beatrice "Bicky" Kane McLain (1906–2004)—called "the matriarch of the band" by the Los Angeles Times—had joined the band by 1987 and traveled with them for the better part of twelve years singing traditional ballads such as the 17th century murder ballad "Two Sisters". Bicky died on April 3, 2004, in Tuscaloosa, Alabama.

== Associated acts ==
Shortly after Michael and Jennifer McLain married, they joined with Raymond Winslow to form "The McLains". In 1999, The McLains released their only album, More Fun Than We Ought to Have (Pinecastle Records). Michael and Jennifer later became the "Michael and Jennifer McLain Band", appending that with "featuring Dan Kelly" when the eponymous fiddler joined their group. They released Hit the Road and Go on November 4, 2016.

When Ruth returned to Berea in 2011, she and the Whites formed "Al, Alice & Ruth". They play "upbeat, Appalachian-flavored bluegrass music [... on the] banjo, fiddle, mandolin, guitar and bass." In March 2013, Al, Alice & Ruth released their first album, Let the Mountains Roll. Their second album, a Christmas album titled 'Tis a Gift, was released December 2014.

Let the Mountains Roll

- Released: March 2013
- Format: Compact disc
- Label: Al, Alice & Ruth
- Tracks: "When the Storm Is Over" (Robert Lucas) · "Cool of the Day" (Jean Ritchie Pickow) · "Dancing with the Angels" (Peter Rowan) · "Foreign Lander" (Traditional) · "My Lazy Day" (Smiley Burnette) · "Killy Kranky" (Traditional) · "Wondrous Love" (Traditional) · "Green, Green Rocky Road" (Traditional) · "Polly Put the Kettle On" (Traditional) · "Pans of Biscuits" (Traditional) · "Angel Gabriel" (Traditional) · "Let the Mountains Roll" (Billy Edd Wheeler) · "Shady Grove" (Traditional)

'Tis a Gift

- Released: December 2014
- Format: Compact disc

== Reception and recognition ==
By 1972, the band was already impressing Bluegrass reviewers.

In his review of the band's 1982 performance at Carnegie Hall, Robert Palmer described the combination of traditional bluegrass and "archaic modal harmonies" as slick and modern. Ultimately, while Palmer called out the amateur qualities of the family's performance, "they performed an attractive mixture of old favorites and originals, and their instrumental and especially their vocal arrangements were consistently fresh." The Pittsburgh Press called a McLain Family Band performance "full of open-hearted earnestness, wholesomeness and energy." Michael Johnathon of WoodSongs Old-Time Radio Hour called the McLain Family Band "musically[,] one of the best bluegrass bands of all times." Johnathon also said of the band, "They took what Bill Monroe did and put their own Kentucky stamp on it. They brought in textures of classical music and made the song and presentation more important than any one lead. They infused a youthful energy and musical depth, creating their own legacy." Sharon White said in 2018, "It is impossible to measure the influence this family band has had on the bluegrass music world. They continue to inspire and mentor future bluegrass musicians through their work in schools and universities."

In 2013, the McLain Family Band received a Distinguished Achievement Award from the International Bluegrass Music Association. In October 2023, Berea College awarded the band a lifetime achievement award upon the occasion of the school's 50th annual Celebration of Traditional Music. In 2024, the band was inducted into the Kentucky Music Hall of Fame.

=== Outside the US ===
In September 1974, United States Ambassador to Pakistan Henry A. Byroade sent a diplomatic cable to the United States Department of State asking for a National Endowment for the Arts (NEA) evaluation of Hellman's Angels and the McLain Family Band for possibly booking concerts in Pakistan. The State Department acquired a review by an NEA panel member, replying, "McLain Family Band is pleasantly amateurish, however, their enthusiasm and spirit make up for their lack of polish and on this basis he would give a 'good' rating."

After their April 11–14, 1975 performances in Manila, United States Ambassador to the Philippines William H. Sullivan reported that the McLain Family Band "performed five times in Manila with excellent results, generating much enthusiasm among university students, professional musicians, and the public. [...] By every indication, McLain's 'bluegrass music' seems very welcome expression of Americana here; it helped dispel notion that Kentucky means only 'fried chicken'. [...] They establish wholesome, happy mood with audience, redily [sic] improvise, are each professionally expert". Similarly, after performing in Laos from April 19–23 that same year, the United States diplomatic mission in Vientiane gave "high praise of McLain Band performances. McLain's [sic] convey dramatically the joy of 'bluegrass music' and evoke enthusiastic audience response. McLain's [sic] are outstanding musicians who represent the finest in American traditions. Seldom in experience of all officers at post have we programmed a more cooperative, congenial and talented group." The McLain Family Band performed in Romania May 21–25, 1975; the United States diplomatic mission in Bucharest had nothing but good things to say about them:

How can anyone not like the McLain Family Band? Sincere people and talented musicians they represent the best in American character traits of friendliness, informality and a sincere respect for and curiosity about other cultures while offering their audiences a taste of a unique American musical genre. [...] Each audience demanded (and received) more than the standard program with 4 or 5 encores becoming the norm. The variety of the McLain program — humorous songs blended with religious and regional numbers impressed the listeners with the richness of bluegrass music. The musical talents and personalities particularly of young Raymond [Winslow] McLain and his sister Ruth provoked continuous applause. The McLain style is deceptively profissional [sic] without being slick or overtly commercial. The misical [sic] arrangements are simple and straight-forward but one never doubts the professionalism, the careful timing and pacing of the program. Audiences included classical music composers, journalists, theatre personalities and, in large numbers, young students. The unanimous reaction was positive with several people asking specifically that the McLains return to Bucharest for a third time. The McLains already have many commitments for 1976 but if they are available for a European tour the post requests a one-week program which will allow provincial city visits.

— United States embassy in Bucharest

High praise came from United States Ambassador to Hungary Eugene V. McAuliffe after the band played there from May 25–30, 1975.

Without doubt the McLain Family Band is the most senstational [sic], attractive and effective cultural presentation which could possibly be fielded by the [United States Government] in support of its goal of projecting the best and most favorable image of the U.S. to any audience, in any country, anwhere [sic]. Musically the McLains are first rate. Personally they radiate enthusiasm, simplicity, love of people, love of music. Their art form is little known, but it tells a lot of a side of American which usuually [sic] little known. They have universal appeal and can charm any audience into foot-stomping, thunderous applause. They are simply the best there is. [...] CU/ARTS could never find any better use of its funds than keeping this group on the road every year for as long as possible to as many countries as possible, and particularly in 1976.

— McAuliffe

Speaking on their performance in Czechoslovakia, Raymond Kane said, "It's one thing to say the trip was a success, but that really doesn't tell what we saw and felt. The Czechs were so overwhelmed that they came up to us and touched our faces and cried."
