= BMAC =

BMAC may refer to:

- Bactria–Margiana Archaeological Complex
- The BMAC substrate, the language of the Bactria–Margiana Archaeological Complex
- Brattleboro Museum and Art Center
- Bacolod-Murcia Milling Company
- Beijing Municipal Administrative Center railway station, under construction, in Tongzhou District, Beijing, China
- Bluegrass Music Association of Canada
- Brown Media Archives Collection
- B-Multiplexed Analogue Component
- Bone marrow aspirate concentrate
- Black Music Action Coalition
