= Camp Samac =

Camp in Oshawa, Ontario, Canada

Camp Samac, Ontario, Canada 43.941628, -78.88667944

Camp Samac is a Scouts Canada camp located in Oshawa, Ontario, Canada. The main entrance is on Simcoe Street North.

== History ==
A 150 acre parcel of land for the camp, which had previously been Brookside Park, was donated by industrialist Sam McLaughlin in 1943. The camp was founded in 1946.

In the 1950s the camp acquired additional land which had previously been the Pleasure Valley Speedway. Additional funds donated by the McLaughlin family were used to create camp building, a swimming pool, and later a water system.

In 1964 Kitchie Lodge, with sleeping accommodations for 80 people, was built. The lodge was renovated in 1980, and in 1982 a 36-bed log bunkhouse was built.

For many years, the camp was used for outdoor education classes by the local school board. During the 1980s and 1990s, the camp hosted monthly gatherings of the Pineridge Bluegrass Folklore Society.

Beginning in about 2002, the camp hosted an annual Beaveree, a fun fair with activities for children aged five to seven. In 2003, a rash of thefts led to the closing of the camp gates to the public.

As well as scouting activities, the camp has been used for many years to host other community events, including training camps for safety patrollers and the Central Lake Ontario Conservation Authority Watershed Festival.

The original pool was removed and replaced with a smaller pool in 1992-1993. The pool offered swim lessons, public swim and was available for the campers. Later the City of Oshawa began renting the pool and providing swimming lessons and recreational swimming. In 2013, the city arranged to take over maintenance of the pool for the 2014 season.

On April 24, 2021, Oshawa City Council officially declared Camp Samac an Ontario Heritage Property, protecting it from future development.
