= EFN =

EFN may refer to:

== Businesses and organizations ==
- Environmentalists for Nuclear, a pro-nuclear power non-profit organization
- EBMA Festival Network, of which the European World of Bluegrass is a member festival
- Education for Nature, founded by the World Wildlife Foundation on behalf of Russell E. Train
- Electronic Frontier Norway, a member of the European Digital Rights advocacy group
- Element Fleet Management Corp. a company listed on the Toronto Stock Exchange
- Environmental Funders Network, cofounded by English environmentalist Ben Goldsmith
- European Federation of Nurses Associations, of which Beverly Malone is a member
- European Folk Network, a member of the European Music Council

== Other uses ==
- DJ EFN (Eric Fernando Narciandi, born 1975), American disc jockey
- Entitlement First Nations, a group of indigenous tribes of which Mathias Colomb First Nation is one
- EXA Financial Network, part of EXA Infrastructure
- "The Experience of Fred Neech", a 2014 mixtape by American rapper Driicky Graham
