= Traditional bluegrass =

Subgenre of bluegrass music

- Stylistic origins: English folk; Scottish folk; Irish folk; Appalachian music; old-time music; African-American music; string bands; blues; jazz
- Cultural origins: Circa 1948, United States
- Typical instruments: Violins typically (Fiddles); violas; cellos; banjos; guitars typically (acoustic guitars and classical guitars); vocals; ukuleles; mandolins; Dobro; upright basses

Other topics
- Bluegrass; progressive bluegrass

Traditional bluegrass, as the name implies, emphasizes the traditional elements of bluegrass music, and stands in contrast to progressive bluegrass. Traditional bluegrass musicians play folk songs, tunes with simple traditional chord progressions, and on acoustic instruments of a type that were played by bluegrass pioneer Bill Monroe and his Blue Grass Boys band in the late 1940s. Traditional bands may use their instruments in slightly different ways, for example by using multiple guitars or fiddles in a band.

In some traditional bluegrass bands, the guitar rarely takes the lead, instead acting as a rhythm instrument, one notable exception being gospel-based songs. Melodies and lyrics tend to be simple, sometimes in the key of G or other keys, and a I-IV-V chord pattern is common. Although traditional bluegrass performers do not use electrically amplified instruments, as used in other forms of popular music, it is common practice to "mike" acoustic instruments during stage performances before larger audiences.

Bill Monroe's mandolin playing style and Kenny Baker's fiddling set the standard for traditional bluegrass musicians on those instruments. Earl Scruggs is recognized as the developer of bluegrass three finger style banjo playing.

There are ideological divisions even among traditional bluegrass bands. These divisions center on the longstanding debate about what constitutes "Bluegrass Music". A few traditional bluegrass musicians do not consider progressive bluegrass to truly be "bluegrass", some going so far as to suggest bluegrass must be styled directly after Bill Monroe's bands. However, stylistic divergences in traditional bluegrass generally center on which first generation bands from which contemporary musicians have drawn inspiration. Examples include bands who sing in the Stanley Brothers tradition: Roy Lee Centers, Larry Sparks, Sammy Adkins, The Fields Bros, The Wilson Brothers, The Gillis Brothers and various local bands across the country. Other bands followed Lester Flatt, such as Willis Spears, Curley Seckler and Karl Shifflett. Mac Wiseman's "crooning" style of Bluegrass engendered Hylo Brown and Sid Campbell. The Osborne Brothers have followers in Larry Stephenson as well as the Grascals. Frank Necessary, Blue Maggie and Hud Hadley were strongly influenced by Jimmy Martin.

== See also ==
- List of bluegrass music festivals
