= Didmarton Bluegrass Festival =

Music festival in the United Kingdom

- Genre: Bluegrass music
- Location: United Kingdom
- Years active: 1988–present
- Website: Didmarton Bluegrass Festival

The Didmarton Bluegrass festival is held annually on the first weekend after the August bank holiday in the United Kingdom. It was originally staged at the Holford Arms, Knockdown, near Didmarton, Gloucestershire, England, for many years, before moving to nearby Kemble Airport in 2004. As of 2010, it had been running for 22 years.

Many big names from the world of bluegrass have performed at Didmarton in the past including Blue Highway, Mollie O'Brien, Nashville Bluegrass Band, Peter Rowan, Roland White, Steve Kaufman and Sally van Meter.

== See also ==
- List of bluegrass music festivals
- List of country music festivals
