= Pineridge Bluegrass Folklore Society =

- Formation: 1977
- Type: Music Society
- Purpose: Preserve and promote bluegrass music
- Location: Oshawa, Ontario, Canada
- Website: http://www.pineridgebluegrass.ca/

The Pineridge Bluegrass Folklore Society (PBFS) is a non-profit organization initiated in 1977 for the purpose of preserving and promoting bluegrass music in Oshawa, Ontario, Canada.

Members of the Pineridge Bluegrass Folklore Society include professional and amateur musicians as well as fans of bluegrass music. In 2013 the club had about 200 members from the Regional Municipality of Durham.

== Activities ==
=== Picking Sessions ===
The Society meets once a month at Woodview Community Centre in Oshawa, Ontario for jam sessions which are open to both members and non-members. Musicians jam in "picking" groups in several rooms. Groups of players, and sometimes visiting bands, take turns performing on stage in the main room to provide entertainment for the members. A slow jam is organized at each session to encourage beginning players and musicians who are new to the bluegrass genre. Members with instrument repair skill give advice at the "Luthier's Corner". The members do not meet during the summer months; instead the musicians and fans disperse to the many bluegrass festivals held around the province.

=== Newsletter ===
The Society publishes a monthly newsletter which keeps members up to date on PBFS activities and provides news from bluegrass events around the province, such as summer festivals, concerts, and jam sessions. The newsletter also provides information about musical techniques, instrument care, etc.

=== Community service ===
Society members take part in local community events and charity fund raisers by providing music at the events. The Society also supports the ArtsCan Circle, a charitable organization that provides musical instruments and music lessons to children in isolated northern communities. Members of the Society also repair donated instruments which are then loaned to local children whose parents can't afford to buy them.

=== Promoting Bluegrass Music ===
The Society regularly organizes musical events, hiring bluegrass bands from around Ontario, and occasionally internationally. They also promote Ontario bluegrass festivals and concerts by giving them free publicity and door prizes and by purchasing festival and concert tickets.

Through bringing together musicians from around Ontario, the Society's monthly meetings and jam sessions have led to the formation of a number of bluegrass bands over the years.

=== Central Canadian Bluegrass Awards ===
PBFS is a long time supporter of the Central Canadian Bluegrass Awards, helping to distribute ballots and sponsoring the Entertainer of the Year Award each year.

== History ==
=== Founding ===
In late 1977, a group of sixteen bluegrass enthusiasts in Ontario County (now Durham Region) began organizing "Pickin' Sessions" in their homes. Over the next few months the number of musicians and bluegrass fans wanting to attend these sessions grew rapidly.

=== Columbus ===
By the following April, nearly 200 people were on the contact list, and the sessions were being held in a rented church hall in the village of Columbus, Ontario. A stage and sound system were set up.

=== Incorporation ===
In 1979, the club was incorporated as the Pineridge Bluegrass Folklore Society, elected its first executive, and created bylaws which specified annual family memberships.

=== Camp Samac ===
As the number of members continue to grow, the Columbus hall became too crowded. The monthly sessions were moved to the Council Hall at Camp Samac on the outskirts of Oshawa, where they continued to be held for over twenty years.

=== Woodview Park Club House ===
In 2002, the Pineridge Bluegrass Folklore Society moved its meetings to the Woodview Park Club House, which has a large upper hall and several rooms of different sizes on the lower level. As of 2013, the Society continues to meet there monthly.
