= WoodSongs Old-Time Radio Hour =

- Running time: 1 hour
- Country of origin: United States
- Language: English
- Home station: WEKU (radio); KET (television)
- Syndicates: Public Radio Exchange (radio); National Educational Telecommunications Association (television)
- TV adaptations: WoodSongs Old-Time Radio Hour
- Starring: Michael Johnathon
- Recording studio: Lyric Theatre and Cultural Arts Center; Lexington, Kentucky
- Original release: 1998
- Website: www.woodsongs.com
- Podcast: www.woodsongs.com/podcast.xml

The WoodSongs Old-Time Radio Hour is a radio program created, produced, and hosted by folk singer Michael Johnathon.

== Background ==
WoodSongs Old-Time Radio Hour is a live audience celebration of grassroots artists and music.

The WoodSongs Old-Time Radio Hour is an all-volunteer-run non-profit organization and is a worldwide multimedia celebration of grassroots music filmed in front of live audience. WoodSongs is a one-hour musical conversation focusing on the artists and their music. The WoodSongs Old-Time Radio Hour began in 1998 in a small studio that had a sitting place for only 20 people. It was recorded on a cassette tape that had to be turned over halfway through the broadcast, and was picked up by one radio station, WRVG in Georgetown, Kentucky. In 1999 WoodSongs moved to a 150-seat room at the Lexington Public Library. After selling out 50 shows in a row, the broadcast was moved in 2000 to the Kentucky Theatre, where it stayed until January 2013 when it moved to the 540-seat Lyric Theatre & Cultural Arts Center. By 2005 WoodSongs was being aired on 320 radio stations, and on 509 radio stations across North America and Internationally by 2013.

== Radio broadcast ==
The radio program is available to both noncommercial and commercial radio stations, one of the few widely distributed radio programs in the United States to be offered to both types of stations. This does not include the addition of the American Forces Network which broadcasts it in 173 nations, to over 1 million listeners worldwide, and every US Naval ship at sea. In Kentucky, KET (Kentucky Educational Television) (PBS) public television airs the show several times a week. It is distributed to public television stations by the National Educational Telecommunications Association. Commercial cable/satellite network RFD-TV also carries the series. The WoodSongs Old-Time Radio Hour produces one show a week for 44 weeks a year every Monday evening at the Lyric Theatre in Lexington, Kentucky, and has produced over 750 broadcasts that have aired worldwide.

== Partnerships ==
The WoodSongs Old-Time Radio Hour occasionally tours. In 2013 the program partnered with Alltech, Kentucky Tourism, Lexington Tourism, and Tourism Ireland to bring WoodSongs to Dublin, Ireland, for a double-broadcast event attended by 2,000 fans at the Dublin Convention Center. The Ireland broadcast celebrated Kentucky bluegrass as presented by Irish bluegrass artists. This broadcast was also presented as a special broadcast on DISH TV Network. This added 14 million USA television homes to the public broadcast of this show. The WoodSongs broadcast was also taken to Eureka Springs, Arkansas, to celebrate the music of the Ozarks. Almost 1,000 fans sold out the auditorium as Ozark musicians of many backgrounds presented their music on a national broadcast.

== Community involvement ==
All artists and WoodSongs members are affiliated with the program on a volunteer basis. WoodSongs allows for community involvement and volunteer opportunities in many ways. In the Central Kentucky community, they involve regional schools and universities for the WoodSongs intern program, which allows students to participate in the set up of nationally broadcast weekly productions. WoodSongs also has ongoing relationships and works closely with music teachers, private instructors, and local arts groups, as well as independent artists who add local performances in the lobby of the Lyric Theatre each night of the WoodSongs broadcast. WoodSongs has a long history of spotlighting and featuring Kentucky and Appalachian artists. They have presented well over 300 different Kentucky artists on a worldwide level including J.D. Crowe, Ben Sollee, Homer Ledford, Dale Ann Bradley, EXILE and The McLain Family Band. The broadcast stage is open to artists of all genres, from all regions, all economic and ethnic backgrounds.

Michael Johnathon started the WoodSongs CoffeeHouse Association which has over 90 concert stages nationwide. The purpose of the WoodSongs CoffeeHouse is to encourage local participation by regional musicians and artists, and to give them a platform to express themselves and surround themselves with the music community.

Johnathon also created the WoodSongs Front Porch Association (501-c-3). The members are called SONGFARMERS, with over 56 community chapters from Hawaii to Florida, Arkansas to Vermont. A TV documentary about the community driven project aired on the RFD-TV Network.

All but some of the oldest shows are archived on the WoodSongs website and can be watched for free. The University of Kentucky is the host of the global WoodSongs archive. This archive is administered by Professor Ron Pen at the John Jacob Niles Center for American Music. DZWR also streams archived episodes of this program every Saturday night.
