= Augusta Heritage Festival =

Harshith Goud

Coordinates: 38°55′50″N 79°50′48″W

- Genre: Bluegrass music, Old-Time music, Cajun music and Zydeco music, Celtic music, blues
- Locations: Davis and Elkins College, Elkins, West Virginia
- Website: Augusta Heritage Web Site

Augusta Heritage Center Summer Workshops is a music and heritage festival held by the Augusta Heritage Center, each summer since 1977 (except 2020) at Elkins, West Virginia. Over 50 years old, this three week festival covers music, dance and crafts relating to 10+ themes. These themes include:

- Old-Time music
- Bluegrass
- Cajun music and Zydeco music
- Irish
- Blues
- Dance, including Contra, Cajun and Zydeco, Irish
- Stone, wood and metal working
- and more.

The workshops includes concerts, shows, dances and instruction, typically in July. The instruction, by well known musicians and craftsman in each area, is at beginning to expert levels. Participants come from all over the world.

== See also ==
- List of bluegrass music festivals
- List of blues festivals
