= Stompin 76 =

1976 music festival in Virginia, United States

Coordinates: 36.782°N 80.922°W

- Genre: Bluegrass music
- Dates: August 6, 7 and 8
- Locations: Carroll County, Virginia
- Years active: 1976
- Attendance: 100,000+
- Website: Stompin 76 Music Festival Official Website

Stompin 76 Music Festival was a three-day music festival held north of Galax, VA in August 1976. Called "the Woodstock of Bluegrass", it took place from Friday through to Sunday, August 6, 7, and 8 in 1976 at the New River Jam Site, owned by the Lawson family.

== History ==
Over 100,000 people attended Stompin 76; including many who were clogged on Carroll County, Virginia area roads. Others parked on Interstate 77 and walked up to 11 miles to reach the event from the highway. Stompin 76 became known as "The Woodstock Of Bluegrass".

Over the course three days during the summer of the American Bicentennial, the festival hosted bluegrass and blues performances. Helicopters and motorcycles were used to get performers and supplies in and out of the rural site located next to the New River in Southwest Virginia, 90 miles west of Roanoke, Virginia on the Virginia-North Carolina Border.

The performers included Bonnie Raitt, Earl Scruggs, Lester Flatt & Nashville Grass, Vassar Clements, Ry Cooder, John Hartford, Osborne Brothers, The Rowans, John Prine, Nitty Gritty Dirt Band, Doc & Merle Watson, The Dillards, Hickory Wind, New Grass Revival, Red, White and Bluegrass, Nashville Bluegrass Band, Papa John Creach, David Bromberg, Star Spangled Washboard Band, Eric Weissberg and Deliverance, Grass On The Rocks, Good Ol' Boys, Joe and Bing.

The concert lasted three days and cost 12 to 15 dollars. As a result of the disturbance the event created, the county instituted laws to control outdoor music festivals. The popularity of Stompin 76 is a contributing factor to the growth of the Galax Fiddler's Convention in the late 1970s.

Promoter Hal Davidson, a Maryland native, established a concert company in Las Vegas the year before, Cactus Productions, Inc., which was the name of the company behind Stompin 76. Hal conceived the idea for a large music festival in mid-February 1976 at his roommate's Reisterstown, MD apartment. Davidson had tired of promoting small venue concerts such as Thin Lizzy, Golden Earring, Spirit, Niles Lofgren, Leslie West, Natalie Cole, Chick Corea and a slew of now classic concerts, in 1975 at U of Maryland Baltimore County, Painter's Mill Music Fair and the Lyric Theater in Baltimore.

In 2010 Davidson said the 2,500-4,000 seat venues multiplied times the anemic $5.50-$7.50 going ticket price at the time, made those concerts entertaining but not necessarily profitable. He felt a major rock festival was needed. When he found out the cost of major rock acts, he decided on bluegrass with a touch of blues, and eventually created Stompin 76.

With a Baltimore staff, Hal Davidson rented a Beechcraft Baron 6 seat airplane, an ex-Vietnam pilot and started promoted the event intensely throughout 20 states March 1, 1976. Davidson's marketing, line-up, and relatively new appeal to east coast festival goers, as well as the timing of the festival during the bicentennial year all contributed to the large attendance.

A 21-week marketing campaign included dozens of eastern US radio stations, Rolling Stone/ Village Voice ads, newspaper ads, and articles, as well as aerial banners over major beaches and pervasive flyer/ poster campaigns at concerts were organized by one of the first festival street teams. The posters said "Super Sound in Our Natural Amphitheater and Free Camping and Parking On Hundreds of Wooded Acres". Tens of thousands of red, white and blue long lasting vinyl bumper stickers were distributed through street teams and mailed back with each ticket order. The great majority of 30,000 or so tickets sold were purchased through mail order. Ticketron, the predecessor of TicketMaster was not in operation until July, 1976, though tickets were available at approx. 25 ticket outlets including Kemp Mill Records in MD, National Record Mart in PA, WV and VA, Strawberry's in Boston and Globe Records in OH and many independent records stores in NC, VA and MD. The great majority of attendees entered for free. Hal Davidson blames CES, the Baltimore-based security company which requested an additional $30,000 to secure the perimeter during the event.

In 2013, following discussion with members of the Hillsville, Virginia community about another Stompin, HillFest 2016 was organized as a 40th anniversary festival. HillFest was headlined by The Church Sisters, Hackensaw Boys and Fake Flowers Real Dirt.

== See also ==
- List of bluegrass music festivals
