= Lyric Theatre and Cultural Arts Center (Lexington, Kentucky) =

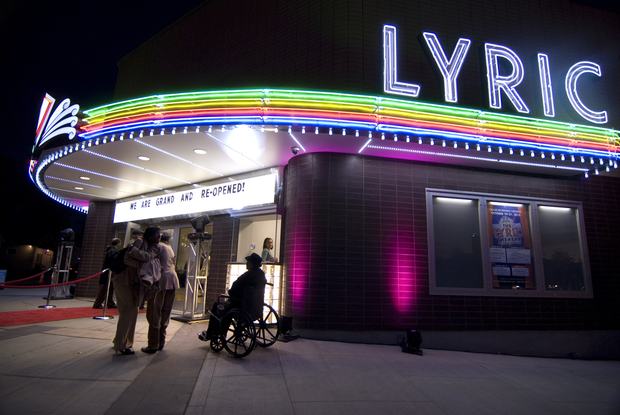
- Interactive map of Lyric Theatre and Cultural Arts Center
- Address: 300 E 3rd Street
- Location: Lexington, Kentucky
- Capacity: 530

Construction
- Opened: 1946
- Renovated: 2010

Tenant
- WoodSongs Old-Time Radio Hour

Website
- www.lexingtonlyric.com

The Lyric Theatre and Cultural Arts Center is a nonprofit, city-owned, multi-use arts and performance venue located at the corner of Third Street and Elm Tree Lane in Lexington, Kentucky, United States. Opened in 1948 as a cultural hub of Lexington's segregated African-American community, the Lyric closed in 1963 and remained in disrepair for almost 50 years. Planning for this renovation began in the 1990s. In 2010, the Urban County Council of Lexington allotted $6 million to revive and reopen the theater under a new mission as a center for art, community, history, and education. The renovated building seats 540 in its proscenium theater and now includes an African-American culture museum, rotating gallery, courtyard, and 325-capacity multi-purpose room. The Lyric hosts arts performances, rental events, luncheons, movie viewings, youth programs, and other events.

Rooted in its African-American heritage, the Lyric focuses on community development in Lexington's East End. The self-stated mission of the Lyric Theatre is "to preserve, promote, present and celebrate diverse cultures with special emphasis on African-American cultural heritage through artistic presentations of the highest quality, educational programming and outreach, film, and opportunities for community inclusion." The Lyric currently hosts a range of community-focused programs, including the Lyric Black Lens Film Series and Woodsongs Old-Time Radio Hour.

== History ==
Originally built as a movie house, the Lyric opened at the corner of Third and Deweese Street (now Elm Tree Lane) in 1948. It became a thriving entertainment hub for Lexington's African-American community. Its architecture was a blend of Art Deco and Spanish Colonial Revival styles. Wrote Janet Holloway in an article for Smiley Pete Publishing,

Only the lobby's tile floor, box office and marquee retain the original look today. Architect Susan Hill has said she found few original features that could be preserved, but what is preserved are memories and a strong history of African American life in Lexington during those years.

During the 1950s, the Lyric hosted performances by big-name jazz and R&B performers like Ray Charles, Count Basie, B.B. King, Wynonie Harris, Mercer Ellington, and Billy Brown. One Lexington resident claimed to have seen James Brown perform there. The theatre also hosted movies, vaudeville acts, fashion shows, local concerts, and pageants. Several small black-owned business, including ice cream bars and clothing stores, were also located in and around the theatre.

In 1963, the Lyric closed due to a steady decline in patronage from the surrounding community, largely a result of desegregation. In the years before closing, it returned to its roots as a movie theater, featuring horror films, black cowboy movies, and Saturday morning cartoons. The building sat decaying and empty for three decades. Community members pressed for renovation throughout the 1990s. In 1996, the city of Lexington faced a lawsuit from the state of Kentucky for failing to build a downtown cultural center as it had promised. As part of the settlement, the city agreed to renovate the Lyric. The groundbreaking ceremony was held Thursday, July 16, 2009.

On October 28, 2010, then-Lexington mayor Jim Newberry cut the ribbon to inaugurate the Lyric's grand reopening ceremony under its new mission as a community and cultural arts center. Celebration activities included the hanging of a community quilt in the theatre lobby, the unveiling of a ceramic tile wall with the motto "We Rise," and a gallery exhibition by Lexington folk artist La Von Williams. The weekend also included a variety of performances by artists including poet Nikki Finney, acting troupe Agape Theatre Group, blues singer Tee Dee Young, and Los Angeles star Miki Howard, who performed not only R&B but also Billie Holiday classics.

A nationwide search for an executive director took place in the year of its opening. The first executive director was Yetta Young, who served from April 2011 to late 2013. Rasheedah El-Amin assumed the director position in January 2014 following Young's departure. After El-Amin's departure in February 2015, Donald Mason was made interim director, and then officially named executive director in October 2015. In April 2019, the Lyric announced the search for a new director.

Whit Whitaker joined the Lyric as executive director in August 2019.

== Board of directors ==
The Lyric's 15-member board operates under the auspices of the Lexington-Fayette County Urban Government. Composed of leadership from the East End neighborhood, elected officials, artists, and members of the business community, the Lyric board oversees the management of and programming for the Lyric Theatre.

- Board Chair: Councilmember James Brown
- Vice Chair: Percy Thomas
- Treasurer: Olivia Davis
- Secretary: Latarika Young
- Christian L. Adair
- Wallace Barber
- George Brown
- Olivia N. Davis
- Carolyn J. Dunn
- Shuling Fister
- Glenda George
- Astarre Gudino
- Seon Jackson
- Melissa Murphy
- Daniel Sheehan
- Patricia C. Tatum
- Frank X. Walker

== Notable performers and performances ==
Since 2013, the Lyric Theatre has hosted the WoodSongs Old-Time Radio Hour. Actress and singer Miki Howard performed at the Lyric Theatre's reopening ceremony in October 2010, as well as Ben Sollee, Tee Dee and Scandalous, the Sacred Drum Ensemble, and the Agape Theatre Troupe. Nikky Finney read a new poem honoring the theater and Bianca Spriggs gave a reading.
