= Podunk (band) =

- Origin: Port Arthur, Texas, U.S. Austin, Texas, U.S.
- Genres: Rock
- Years active: 1992–present
- Labels: Core Records; Matchbox Records
- Members: Jason Touchette; Duncan Isenhower; Paul Soroski; Brian Hays

Podunk is a hard rock band that formed in Port Arthur, Texas in 1992, soon thereafter establishing themselves on the scene in Austin, Texas. Similar to AC/DC and The Black Crowes in style, Podunk performed at South by Southwest in the mid-1990s and subsequently. Their CD Throwin' Bones, released in 1998, was re-released nationally by Matchbox Records in 2000, and the track "Wings" saw airplay nationwide. Podunk's songs have appeared on several of KLBJ's Local Licks Live series of recordings. They opened for Tesla on some tour dates in 2004. They have also opened nationwide for King's X. The band has enjoyed a number of positive reviews in US press outlets.

== Members ==
Current members

- Jason Touchette – guitar, lead vocals
- Duncan Isenhower – guitar, vocals
- Paul Soroski – bass guitar
- Brian Hays – drums

Former members

- Bryan Jones - guitar, background vocals
- Dwight Baker- drums, percussion

== Discography ==
- Breech (1995)
- Murlin's Dock (1996)
- Throwin' Bones (1998)
- Podunk (2002)
- The Vault (2013)

== See also ==
- Music of Austin
