= European World of Bluegrass =

- Also known as: EWOB festival
- Origin: Europe, Voorthuizen
- Genres: Bluegrass
- Years active: 18
- Website: ewob.eu

The European World of Bluegrass (EWOB Netherland) is an annual three-day event which was initially held in 1998 in the town of Lichtenvoorde, Netherlands, and is now being held annually in the town of Voorthuizen, Netherlands. This festival is held in May or June, during the “Ascension day”, Christian religious holiday. The festival normally begins on a Thursday and ends the following Saturday night. Every year musicians from countries in Europe and around the world travel to meet and perform. During the festival about 50 bands or 200 musicians perform. Every year the EWOB attracts 500 to 600 visitors.

== Format of the festival / Design ==
During the bluegrass festival there are stage performances that take place in the public room of the building 't Trefpunt. The best bluegrass bands from Europe participate in a battle to win the European bluegrass band award. The musicians from the festival vote to determine who is the winner. The public also vote to determine who gave the best performance.

Parallel to the festival, workshops dealing with bluegrass are performed by renowned European and / or American bluegrass musicians. There are also activities and workshops for children of all ages as EWOB strives to be a family oriented bluegrass event as well.

Near the location is a campsite which can be used. The camping itself is located on a sports field adjacent to the main bluegrass festival and is equipped with good sanitary facilities, with hot running water for showering and free parking. EWOB supplies its attendees with around the clock first aid volunteers, security and a transportation system to and from the festival.

== History ==
In the year 1995 a group of people throughout Europe, started a network called European Bluegrass Network (EBN). The task of this network was and is to coordinate activities across the Bluegrass State borders. Pretty soon it became clear that a European bluegrass festival was needed. In line with the wishes of EBN in the Netherlands a group of volunteers who then resurrected in 1998 organized the first festival. EBN then developed further so that in 2001 became an association with statutes, a board and paying members. Thus, the European Bluegrass Music Association (EBMA) was born. European World of Bluegrass was organized by members of the board of EBMA and the festival in the Netherlands, EWOB festival was conducted under the umbrella of EBMA up to 2010. In 2011, the EWOB festival in the Netherlands became an independent organization and one of the founders of the EBMA Festival Network (EFN).

The mission of EBMA states working together to support bluegrass music and each other across national borders. EBMA also wants to promote and facilitate the sharing of Bluegrass enjoyment across borders (regional or national), support bands, fans, musicians, organizations, professionals and everything connected to Bluegrass. The organization is a non-profit, professionally run, dynamic and inclusive organisation. It aims to get more people in Europe interested and involved in bluegrass and enhance the image of bluegrass music. (source: www.ebma.org) These stated objectives are achieved by holding annual meetings, maintaining a website as the primary means of communication, and creating contacts between European bluegrass people (networks).

== Remarks of bluegrassmusic ==
The bluegrass music is played with acoustic string instruments. The instruments that are used in line with the tradition are banjo, mandoline, guitar, violin, dobro en double bass. Besides these instruments the voice is a key element to make this kind of music.

== Bluegrass in the Netherlands ==
In the Netherlands there is a relative small group approximately 2000 active and/or passive busy with bluegrass music. The EWOB festival in Voorthuizen has the function of being the most important public event in the country. In June of the year 2013 the 16th edition of the festival in a row took place. This festival sets an example for many local 'Picking Parties' organised through the year.

In the past 16 years of EWOB Bluegrass festivals in the Netherlands the following countries through bands were represented:
Austria, Belgium, Bulgaria, Czech Republic, Denmark, England, Estonia, Finland, France, Germany, Hungary, Ireland, Italy, Lithuania, Netherlands, Northern Ireland, Norway, Poland, Russia, Scotland, Slovakia, Slovenia, Spain, Sweden, Switzerland and the United States.

In the past period of 18 European World of Bluegrass festivals about 300 Bluegrass Bands performed once or more than once. A list of names of Bluegrass Bands can be found HERE.

== Bluegrass international ==
Bluegrass is originally from Northern America. Therefore the main language is English. Among others a few big names in the world of Bluegrass are Bill Monroe, Earl Scruggs, Ralph Stanley, and Lester Flatt.

In Europe there is a chain of Bluegrass festivals. An overview made by EBMA in 2011 can be found here.

== See also ==
- List of bluegrass music festivals
- List of European bluegrass festivals

== Sources ==
- EBMA European Bluegrass Music Association.
