= Michael Johnathon =

American folk musician and writer

- Born: January 22, 1963 (age 63)
- Genres: Folk
- Occupations: Musician, record producer, author, playwright

Michael Johnathon is an American folk singer-songwriter, producer, author, and playwright. He has released 20 albums, published 5 books, a play, composed an opera, performs with symphony orchestras and in coffee houses, completed a motion picture script, created three volunteer organizations and tours nationwide.

== Career ==
Originally from the Hudson Valley in New York State, Johnathon moved to the border town of Laredo, TX to work at KLAR-AM. At the urging of folksinger Pete Seeger, Johnathon moved to Mousie, Kentucky in the Appalachian mountains to learn folk tradition and music. He began his folk career performing at schools and fairs and touring with established artists including David Gates, Odetta, Janis Ian, Tom Paxton, Billy Dean and Judy Collins. Johnathon began performing Earth Concerts in schools. In four years, he performed over 3,000 concerts for nearly 2 million people in 14 states. Another series he created was The Passing on the subject of teenage suicide, which he performed at 108 high schools and colleges in 12 weeks, attended by over 250,000 students. Other concert tours were in support of his records and books, farm families (WagonStar), and battered women and children (The Mountain).

He has recorded and released 20 albums on PoetMan Records USA most recently The Painter and "Garden of Silence"studio albums. He has published 6 books including WoodSongs 5 and Mousie HiWay that introduces children to bluegrass music. The audio book of Mousie HiWay was recorded with the McLain Family Band.

Michael also produced and release the "UnXpected" album by 12 year old Phoebe White with Riders In The Sky and the McLain Family Band.

Among his recordings is New Wood recorded and filmed with Odetta and The Dream recorded with a 61-piece symphony orchestra and four children's choirs singing in Russian, English, French, and Spanish. Johnathon has recorded with guest artists including Sam Bush, Rob Ickes, Odetta, Homer Ledford, the McLain Family Band, John Cowan, Michael Cleveland, Guy Davis, JP Pennington, and JD Crowe.

The live album Looking Glass, featuring vocalist Melissa Deaton-Johnathon, was recorded in concert at several theatres from Arkansas to Ireland.

His CD release of SongFarmer was the first national album to be entirely recorded on an iPhone and received the Roots Album of the Year Award by the National Traditional Music Association in 2018.

Johnathon produces the all-volunteer, community-run Troubadour Concert Series at the Lexington Opera House, Kentucky Castle, Lyric Theatre, Kentucky Theater in Lexington, and the Paramount Arts Center in Ashland, Kentucky. By 2018, the volunteer organization produced over 400 concert events with artists including BB King, Steve Martin, Joan Baez, Arlo Guthrie, Lindsay Buckingham, Keb Mo, Taj Mahal, Brian Wilson, and Gregg Allman.

Johnathon is the founder, producer and host of the WoodSongs Old-Time Radio Hour, a folk/roots/Americana multi-media program. The weekly live show from the Lyric Theatre & Cultural Arts Center in Lexington, Kentucky is recorded for broadcast on 537 radio stations, webcasts, and public radio and television. The broadcast is heard by over two million listeners and is carried by the American Forces Radio Network (AFN). The webcast and downloadable archives can be accessed at the Woodsongs website. The TV broadcast reaches an audience of 96 million on public stations nationwide. Some of the hundreds of artists to appear on the broadcast include Tommy Emmanuel, Chris Thile, Judy Collins, Big Bad Voodoo Daddy, Asleep at the Wheel, Richie Havens, Peter Yarrow, the Avett Brothers, Chris Stapleton, Dr. Ralph Stanley, Elle King, Lee Ann Womack, Preservation Hall Jazz Band, Mark O'Connor, Bela Fleck & Abigail Washburn, JD Crowe, Edgar Meyer and Roger McGuinn.

WoodSongs Classroom Programs in partnership with the University of Kentucky makes available at no cost broadcasts of WoodSongs to teachers and homeschools to encourage roots music education.

To commemorate Earth Day, Johnathon wrote the script for the play Walden: The Ballad of Thoreau, performed in over 8,900 colleges, community theatres, high schools and home schools in nine countries. The play is set during the final two days Henry David Thoreau spent at his cabin on Walden Pond and explores the contemporary processes in the protection of the earth and home communities. A film of the play aired nationwide on PBS stations and was awarded a 2009 John Muir Award for Feature Film.

His composition of the songs Front Porch and SongFarmers Blues inspired the creation of the WoodSongs Front Porch Association of SongFarmers. The group brings front porch pickers from around the nation together and has active chapters across the United States.

In October 2018 Johnathon toured with a musical concept called Songs of Rural America. Fully orchestrated, the 17-song concert celebrates rural communities, merging the roots audience with the classical world. The orchestration was written by Michael Johnathon and Joshua Carter. The concert with The Ohio Valley Symphony in Gallipolis OH was filmed as a public television special for broadcast on PBS stations nationwide.

In 2020 he released LEGACY, a full length studio album. The title cut is a 9-minute epic that goes from Pete Seeger to Dylan to the collapse of the record industry as we know it. The album also includes two Dylan covers including a total rebuild of Rolling Stone.

In 2021 he recorded and released the full length album, The Painter. He was also selected to receive the important MILNER AWARD from the Governor of Kentucky. His next book WoodSongs 5 is planned June 2021, dedicated to Vincent van Gogh and includes "The Painter" album.

In 2022 his 19th album, AFTERBURN was released

Coming in 2023 will be Michael Johnathon's 20th album release GARDEN OF TIME, the release of the next 176-page book WOODSONGS 6 and the national broadcast of a new television program called WOODSONGS KIDS

His latest project is the motion picture screenplay, "CANEY CREEK: The Legend of Alice Lloyd" and another screenplay called "THE PAINTER" about Vincent van Gogh.

== Discography ==
- The Blast (1986 INDIE out of print)
- Troubadour (1989 INDIE out of print)
- Dreams of Fire (1992, Global Pacific out of print)
- Assassins in the Kingdom (1995, PoetMan out of print)
- WoodSongs (1998, PoetMan)
- WoodSongs I Book & CD Gift Set (1998, 176 pages plus WoodSongs CD, PoetMan)
- The Road (2000, PoetMan)
- Homestead (2003, PoetMan)
- WoodSongs II Book & CD Gift Set (2004, 176 pages plus Homestead CD, PoetMan)
- Michael Johnathon and the Folkboy Orchestra-Live! (2004, Poetman)
- Evening Song (2006, PoetMan)
- Walden: The Earth Song Collection (2008, PoetMan)
- Walden: The Ballad of Thoreau DVD & CD Gift Set (2010, PoetMan)
- Ravenwood (2010, PoetMan)
- Front Porch (2012, PoetMan)
- Woody: For The People arias from the Woody Guthrie Opera (2013 PoetMan)
- Looking Glass: The Live Concert Album (2014 PoetMan)
- WoodSongs: In the Beginning (remix 2015 PoetMan)
- SongFarmer (iPhone album 2016 PoetMan)
- Pirate (2017 PoetMan)
- WoodSongs III Book & CD Gift Set (2017 176 pages plus Sampler CD, PoetMan)
- Mousie HiWay Book & CD (32 page children's book fully illustrated by Michael Johnathon)
- MOONFIRE The Banjo Album (2018 PoetMan)
- DAZED & CONFUZED (2019 PoetMan)
- WoodSongs 4 Book & CD Gift Set (2019 176 pages plus Dazed & Confuzed CD, PoetMan)
- SONGS OF RURAL AMERICA with The Ohio Valley Symphony (2019 PoetMan)
- LEGACY (2020) PoetMan
- THE PAINTER (2021) PoetMan
- AFTERBURN: Folk at Arena Level (2022 PoetMan)
- GARDEN OF SILENCE (2023 PoetMan)
