= Podunk Bluegrass Festival =

Annual music festival in Connecticut, US

Coordinates: 41.8246°N 73.2233°W

- Genre: Bluegrass music
- Dates: August
- Locations: Connecticut, United States
- Years active: 1996-present
- Founders: Robert DeCrescenzo, Mike Hayden, Kevin Lynch
- Website: Official website

The Podunk Bluegrass Festival is a bluegrass festival established in 1996 and taking place in August each year in Connecticut, United States. The festival features local, regional, and national bluegrass musicians. Besides four days of music on the main stage, the festival hosts band and songwriting competitions, a kid's bluegrass academy, workshops with headlining bands, and separate picking and quiet camping areas.

== History ==
The Podunk Bluegrass Festival was founded in the winter of 1995–96, by then Mayor of East Hartford, CT, Robert DeCrescenzo with assistance by recording studio owner Mike Hayden and musician/radio host Kevin Lynch. It was DeCrescenzo's vision to renovate large sections of the city and, in addition, establish an arts scene downtown. It was also his idea to make a bluegrass music festival a large part of that vision. DeCrescenzo vowed, together with Hayden and Lynch, to present a first-class bluegrass event. That summer of '96, DeCrescenzo promised to have the new downtown park built and ready to use in time for the festival. Roger Moss, then director of the Park & Rec Department, hustled to get the finishing touches completed a few weeks before the first festival on July 26–27, 1996. No small task, it involved laying sod at Martin Park where the main stage was constructed, and building a small bridge festival attendees could cross to access the park.

In order to help publicize the inaugural festival, DeCrescenzo organized a breakfast in the Town Hall to promote the event on the Thursday morning before the festival gates opened in Martin Park. Some 40 people were in attendance. Town officials, potential sponsors, and invited press were treated to a live bluegrass concert by a group of local musicians. The official event kicked off on Friday, July 26, 1996, with a free bluegrass concert open to the public in the downtown park on Main Street. The lineup of artists for the first Podunk Bluegrass Music Festival included John Hartford, Mac Wiseman, Laurie Lewis, Larry Sparks & The Lonesome Ramblers, The New Coon Creek Girls, Lost & Found, plus local CT band Northern Bound.

Until 2011, the festival was held in East Hartford, Connecticut; in 2012 it was moved to Norwich, Connecticut.

The 2013 festival had to be canceled because of scheduling conflicts with the minor-league baseball club at Dodd Stadium in Norwich.

In 2014, the newly relocated festival was held the second weekend of August at the Hebron Fairgrounds in Hebron, Connecticut. After a successful five-year run in Hebron, Podunk moved to its current location at the Goshen Fairgrounds in the Litchfield Hills of Northwest CT.

Podunk has hosted many widely known bluegrass bands, including Kathy Mattea, Ralph Stanley and the Clinch Mountain Boys, Doc Watson, Mac Wiseman, the Del McCoury Band, John Hartford, Vassar Clements, Jesse McReynolds, Doyle Lawson, Ricky Skaggs and Kentucky Thunder, the Lonesome River Band, Emmylou Harris, the Seldom Scene, Tony Rice, Tony Trischka, Sam Bush, Tim O'Brien, David Grisman, Peter Rowan, Dale Ann Bradley, the Kruger Brothers, Michael Cleveland, Rhonda Vincent and the Rage, the Gibson Brothers, Nickel Creek, the Steeldrivers, and dozens of up-and-coming local and regional bands.

== Recognition ==
In 2010, Podunk won the International Bluegrass Music Association award for Event of the Year.

== See also ==
- List of bluegrass music festivals
- List of country music festivals
