= List of bluegrass music festivals =

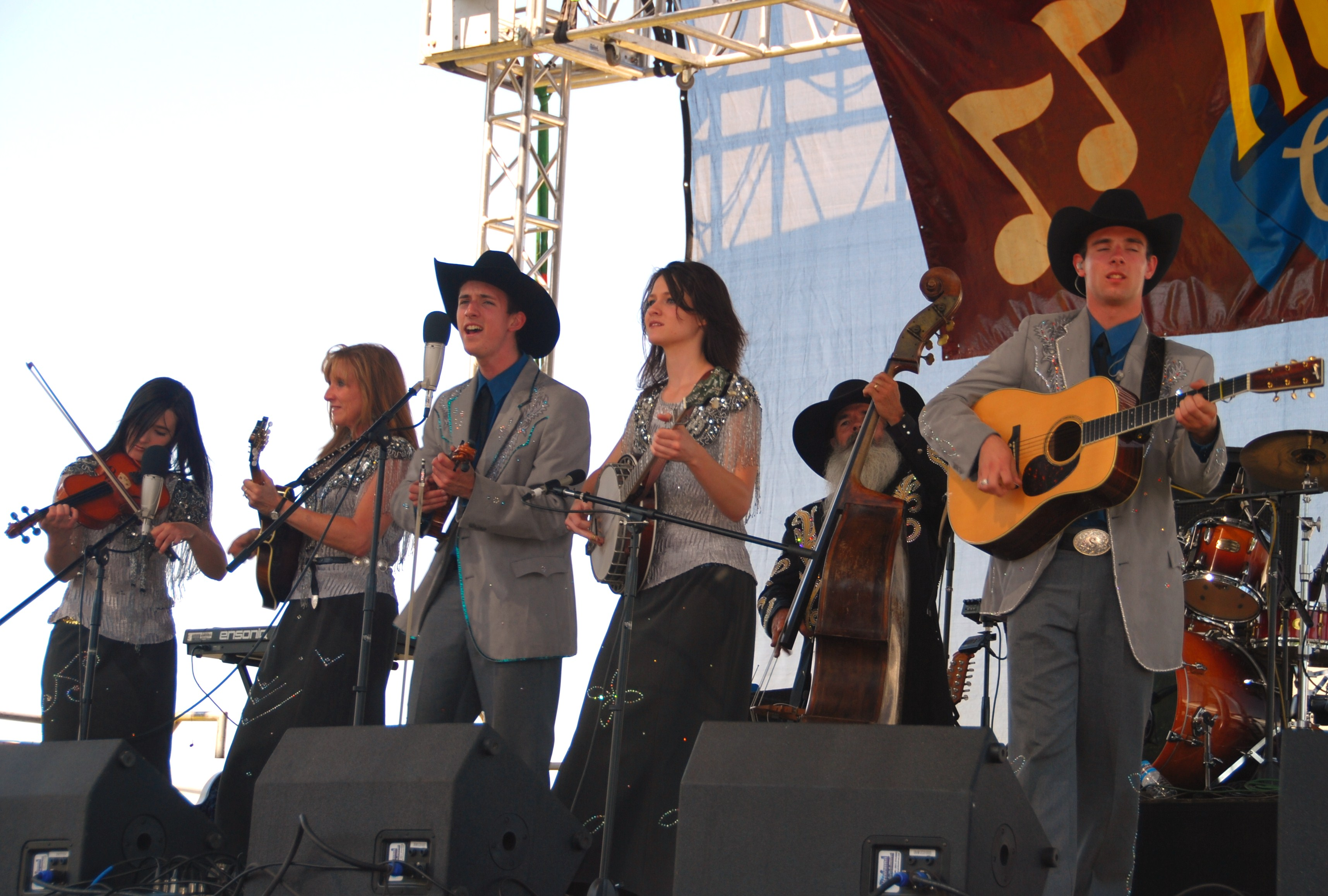
Huck Finn Festival, 2007

This is a list of bluegrass music festivals that have Wikipedia articles or are otherwise verified by an independent, reliable, published source. This list may have some overlap with the umbrella topic list of folk festivals, and more complete overlap with list of country music festivals.

Bluegrass music is a form of American roots music, and a subgenre of country music. Bluegrass was inspired by the music of Appalachia. It has mixed roots in Irish, Scottish, Welsh, and English traditional music, and also later influenced by the music of African Americans through incorporation of jazz elements.

== Festivals ==
=== North America ===
Topanga Banjo Fiddle Contest and Folk Festival	Agoura Hills, United States	1961
Central Canadian Bluegrass Awards	Huntsville, Canada	1971
Mount Airy Fiddlers Convention	Mount Airy, United States	1972
Indiana Fiddlers' Gathering	Battle Ground, United States	1972
Walnut Valley Festival (Stage 5)	Winfield, United States	1972
Telluride Bluegrass Festival	Telluride, United States	1973
Festival of the Bluegrass	Lexington, United States	1974
Huck Finn Jubilee	Ontario, United States	1974
Stompin 76	Galax, United States	1976
California Bluegrass Association Father's Day Festival	Grass Valley, United States	1976
Vandalia Gathering	Charleston, United States	1977
Tottenham Bluegrass Festival	Tottenham, Canada	1983
MerleFest	Wilkesboro, United States	1988
Appalachian String Band Music Festival (aka Clifftop)	Clifftop, United States	1990
Augusta Heritage Festival	Elkins, United States	1990s
High Sierra Music Festival	Quincy, United States	1991
Podunk Bluegrass Festival	Norwich, United States	1996
Oklahoma International Bluegrass Festival	Guthrie, United States	1996
Hardly Strictly Bluegrass	San Francisco, United States	2001
10,000 Lakes Festival	Detroit Lakes, United States	2003
Bluegrass Underground	Cumberland Caverns, United States	2008
DelFest	Cumberland, Maryland	2008
Charm City Bluegrass Festival	Baltimore, United States	2013
Grey Fox Bluegrass Festival	Oak Hill, United States	1982
Bloomin' Bluegrass	Farmer's Branch, Texas, United States	2009
Rogersville Bluegrass Festival	Rogersville, New Brunswick, Canada	1990
Bluegrass Battles Hunger	St. Joseph, Missouri, United States	2011

=== Oceania ===
Festival name	City/Venue	Remarks
Canberra Country Blues & Roots Festival	Canberra, Australia	
Tamworth Country Music Festival	Tamworth, New South Wales, Australia	

=== Europe ===
Festival name	City/Venue	Country	Remarks				
Didmarton Bluegrass Festival		United Kingdom	Early September, Kemble Airfield Enterprise Park, Cirencester, Gloucestershire	Güglinger Bluegrass Festival	Güglingen	Germany	The Güglinger Bluegrass Festival was an annual bluegrass music festival. The festival became one of the largest bluegrass festivals in Europe until it ceased after 2001. The Int. Bühler Bluegrass Festival in Bühl (Baden), Germany, can be regarded as its successor. The festival attracted major bands from the American scene like the Nashville Bluegrass Band, Country Gazette, The Tony Rice Unit, Laurie Lewis and Grant Street, and Tim O'Brien and the O'Boys.
European World of Bluegrass	Voorthuizen	Netherlands					
Bluegrass Beeg		Netherlands					
Lonesome Pine Indoor Country Festival	Sunne Värmland	Sweden	Usually held in January.				
Bluegrass Outlaw Party	Club Heidegger, grote Kerkplein 70, Rotterdam	Netherlands	Usually held in February.				
Gainsborough Old Time Festival	Gainsborough	United Kingdom	Usually held in February.				
International Workshop of Acoustic Music	Virton	Belgium	Usually held in April.				
Sore Fingers Week	Lord Wandsworth College, Long Sutton, Hampshire	United Kingdom	One week festival usually held in April				
Stage Bluegrass en Gascogne	32330 Gondrin	France	Usually held in April.				
Kilkenny Rhythm 'n' Roots Festival	Kilkenny	Ireland	Roots music with an Irish and oldtime flavour				
Bordergrass Hopelands in Weobley	Herefordshire	United Kingdom					
Alie Rohling Festival "Pickers against Cancer"	zaal de Loo - Looweg 38 Coevorden	Netherlands	Beneficial concert, all funds raised go to the Dutch Cancer Foundation.				
SC 40 jaar Farewell Reunion Festival	De Muzeval, Emmen	Netherlands	Bluegrass & acoustic country a one-time only event to celebrate the completion of 40 years of Strictly Country magazine - European & US groups				
Venner Folk Frühling	Venne	Germany	accent on folk				
13th Oldtime Music Meeting	Wippenhausen Kirchdorf	Germany	Musicians only registration mandatory				
Orwell Bluegrass Festival	Orwell Crossing	United Kingdom	-				
Banjoree European 5-String Banjo Meeting	Hagen	Germany	Gathering of banjopickers, also with guitar and mandolin workshops. Held every second year				
International Bühl Bluegrass Festival	Bühl	Germany	established 2002, city sponsorship				
Bath Americana Festival	Bath	United Kingdom	-				
Red Wine Bluegrass Party	Genova	Italy	two nights show featuring Red Wine with guest artists from the US				
Boe't n Deure	Odoorn	Netherlands	Bluegrass concerts held in a small cafe				
Spring Bluegrass Festival	Alberswil/Willisau	Switzerland	Last event 2019, now discontinued .				
Jamboree	Strakonice	Czech Republic	-				
Sacrewell Spring Camp (Friends of American Oldtime Music and Dance)	Gainsborough	United Kingdom	-				
EWOB Convention & Tradeshow	Voorthuizen	Netherlands	about 50 bands, on 3 days, international lineup				
Coastline Bluegrass Music Event	Bryn Ffanigl Ganol Farm, Dolwen, Llanddulas, Wales	United Kingdom	-				
Karl May Festival Radebeul	Radebeul	Germany	celebrating bluegrass while celebrating Germany's wild west author				
Hamawé Roots Festival	Ethe/Virton	Belgium	on the Farm Roiseux				
GrevenGrass Bluegrassfestival	Greven	Germany	-				
FBMA Spring Bluegrass Weekend (Pentecôte)	près de Rennes, à la Maison Familiale Rurale Horticole "Les Rabinardières"	France					
Ruotsinpyhtää Bluegrass Rendezvous	Helsinki	Finland	Finland's oldest bluegrass festival, first held in 1988				
Annual La Grange Rouge Bluegrass and French Folk TRAD EN FETE	La Grange Rouge	France	Usually held in June				
Big Bear Festival	De Kimme, Zuidlaren	Netherlands	bluegrass & acoustic country music - European & US bands				
Banjo Jamboree	Caslav	Czech Republic	oldest running European bluegrass festival. Camping and included and international lineup				
Festival sur la Route de Tullins	Isere	France	-				
Internationales Kötzer Country Music Festival	Günzhalle, 89359 Koetz	Germany	-				
Westport Folk and Bluegrass Festival	Westport, Co. Mayo	Ireland	Established in 2007; international lineup				
Choteborský džem	Letna 255, 583 01 Chotebor +420776311290	Czech Republic					
East Anglian Bluegrass Festival	Steeple Morden	United Kingdom	Youth performances				
Haapavesi Folk Festival	Haapavesi	Finland	-				
TFF Rudolstadt (roots folk world music)	Rudolstadt	Germany	City organized				
Lida Country Festival	Lida	Sweden	-				
Åmåls Blues Fest	Åmål	Sweden	Usually held in July.				
Torsåker Bluegrass Festival	Torsaker	Sweden /					
North Wales Bluegrass Festival	Conwy, Wales	United Kingdom	established 1989				
Munich BlueGrass Festival	Munich	Germany	Music at the farm				
Bluegrass Festival Gunderinseli	Thun	Switzerland	-				
Athy Bluegrass Festival	Athy	Ireland	Ireland's oldest annual Bluegrass event, established 1991				
Americana Festival	Newark	United Kingdom					
UTV Country Fest	Aura Complex Letterkenny, Donegal	Ireland	-				
Nääsville Bluegrass Festival	Frölunda	Sweden					
Risor Bluegrass Festival	Risor	Norway	music on stage and workshops - with workshops the week preceding the festival				
Cerexhe Festival	Cerexhe	Belgium	Country, Established 1985				
Totaalfestival	Bladel	Netherlands					
Cambridge Folk Festival	Cambridge	United Kingdom	-				
Country Rendez-Vous	Craponne sur Arzon	France					
Guildtown Bluegrass Festival	Guildtown	United Kingdom	-				
Lonesome Pine Festival	Canis-Lysvik	Sweden	-				
La Roche International Bluegrass Festival	La Roche-sur-Foron	France	first week of August				
International Bluegrass and Acoustic Music Festival	Abaliget	Hungary	Three days of bluegrass and acoustic music on a lakeside in the Hungarian countryside.				
Surrey Mini Bluegrass Festival	Mickleham Village Hall	United Kingdom	-				
Sacrewell Summer Camp (Friends Of American Oldtime Music And Dance)	Gainsborough	United Kingdom	-				
Bluegrass Family Festival	Stetten	Switzerland	family operated gathering place for the Swiss bluegrass community. Discontinued since 2016				
Gränna Bluegrass Festival	Gränna	Sweden	30th anniversary in 2007				
Floralia Country Festival	Oosterhout	Netherlands	-				
Dunmore East Bluegrass Festival	Dunmore East	Ireland	established 1995				
Tønder Folk Festival	Tønder	Denmark	international folk and bluegrass acts				
Didmarton Bluegrass Festival	Kemble Airfield Didmarton	United Kingdom	international lineup				
Appalachian and Bluegrass Music Festival	Omagh, Northern Ireland	United Kingdom	held in a historic folk park established 1992 international lineup				
Bluegrass Marathon	Borovany u Tachova	Czech Republic	established 1979				
Picnic Festival	Namur	Belgium	Bluegrass & Celtic Festival				
Int. Bluegrass Meeting Kulturgewächshaus Birkenried	Gundelfingen	Germany	Music in the Greenhouse				
Sunny Mountain Bluegrass Festival	Stettfurt	Switzerland					
The Open House Festival	Bangor, Northern Ireland	United Kingdom	Six days of roots music in the centre of Belfast				
Gower Bluegrass Festival	Parkmill, Gower, Wales	United Kingdom	-				
Sweet Sunny South Festival	Hastings	United Kingdom	-				
Cornish Bluegrass Festival	Newquay	United Kingdom	since 2004				
Johnny Keenan Banjo Festival	Longford	Ireland	Irish Traditional, American Bluegrass, and Folk Music				
Moniaive Michaelmas Bluegrass Festival	Moniaive, Dumfries, Scotland	United Kingdom	-				
Bruff Bluegrass Festival	Main St, Bruff, Co. Limerick	Ireland	This event takes place in three venues over three evenings with late night mike sessions. Banjo and guitar workshops and picking gatherings in afternoon on Sunday.				
Pick Your Passion Camp Munich Aschau/Chiemgau,	n/Munich	Germany	-				
Sore Fingers Long-Weekend, Mid October	Lord Wandsworth College, Long Sutton, Hook, Hampshire	United Kingdom	tutored sessions: learning bluegrass, jamming, tutor concert Saturday evening				
Bluegrass Beeg	Grevenbicht Sittard-Geleen	Netherlands	Bluegrass music festival. Autism friendly .				
Old Time Country Festival	Breitisaal 8185 Winkel	Switzerland	organized by American folk club Rocking Chair				
Trafaria Bluegrass International Music Festival	Trafaria, Almada	Portugal	Anual event, promoted since 2022. Community festival organized by a local association (Recreios Desportivos da Trafaria)				

== Gallery ==
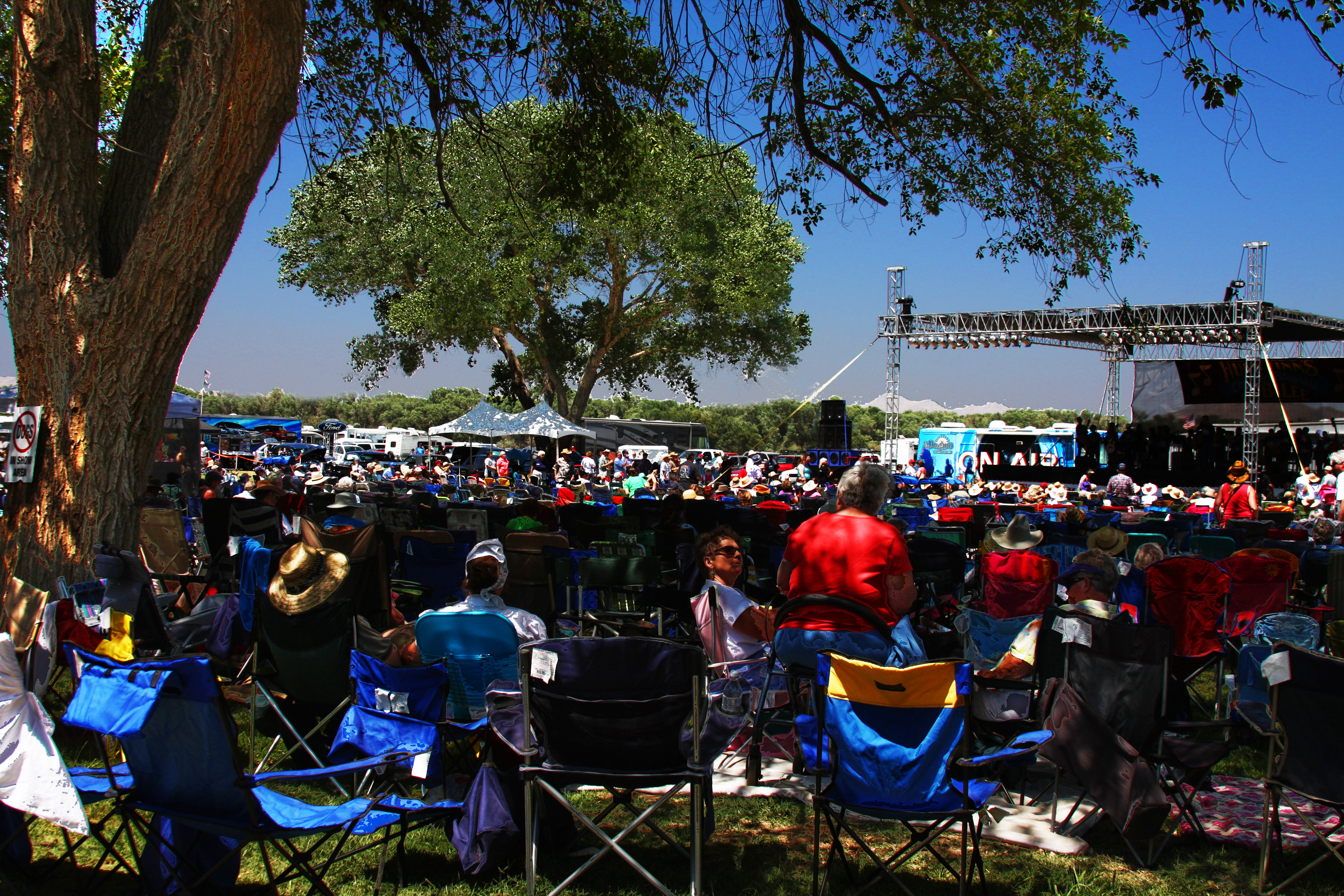
Huck Finn Jubilee and Bluegrass Festival 2009

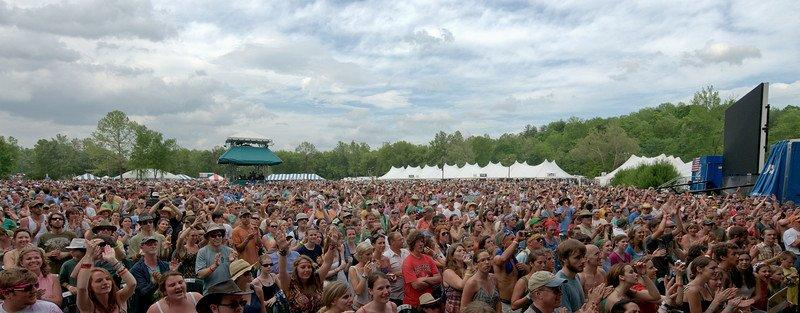
MerleFest Crowd during Avett Brothers Performance

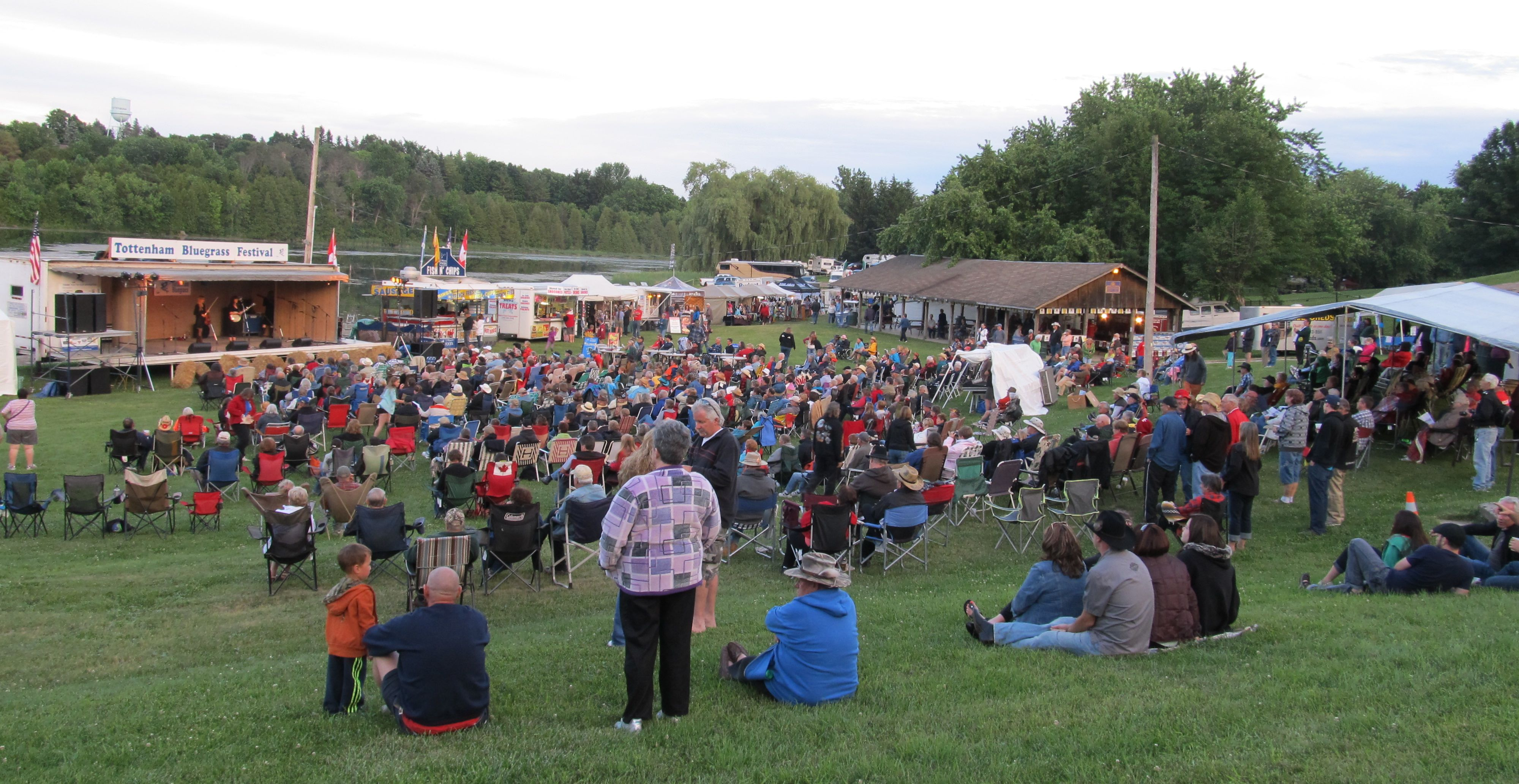
Bluegrass fans in the concert area at the 2014 Tottenham Bluegrass Festival

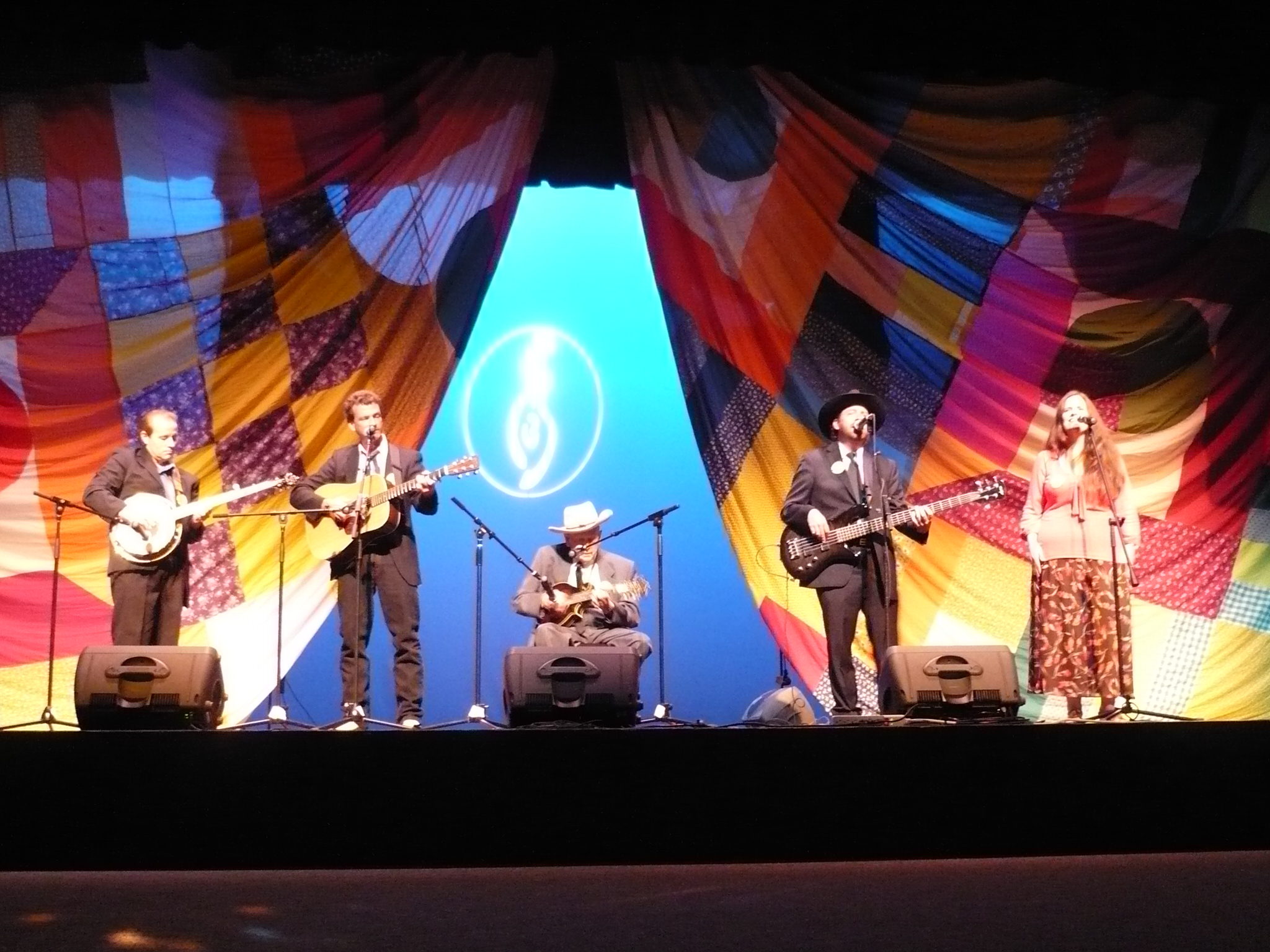
Vandalia Gathering

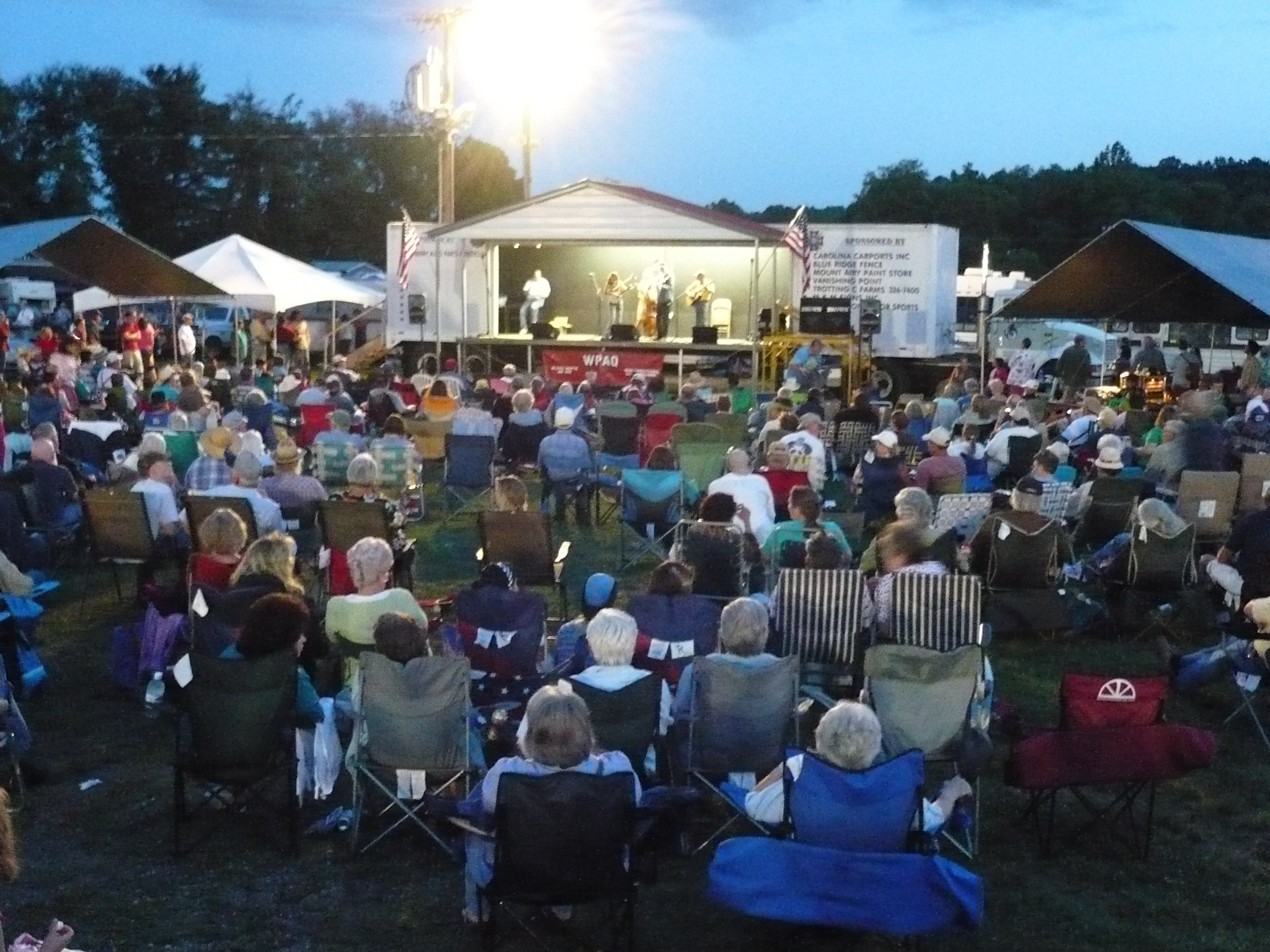
Mount Airy Fiddlers Convention

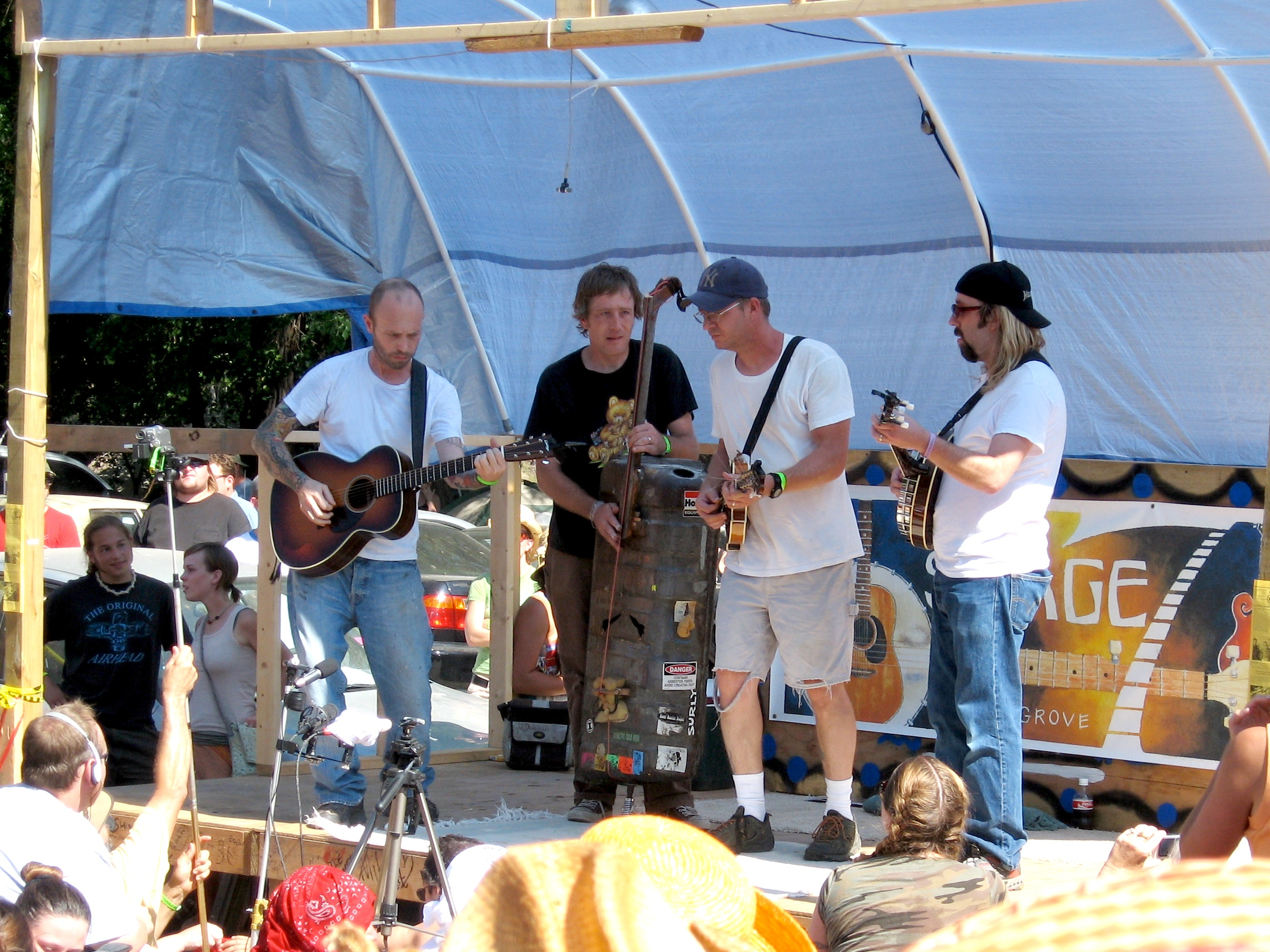
Walnut Valley Festival

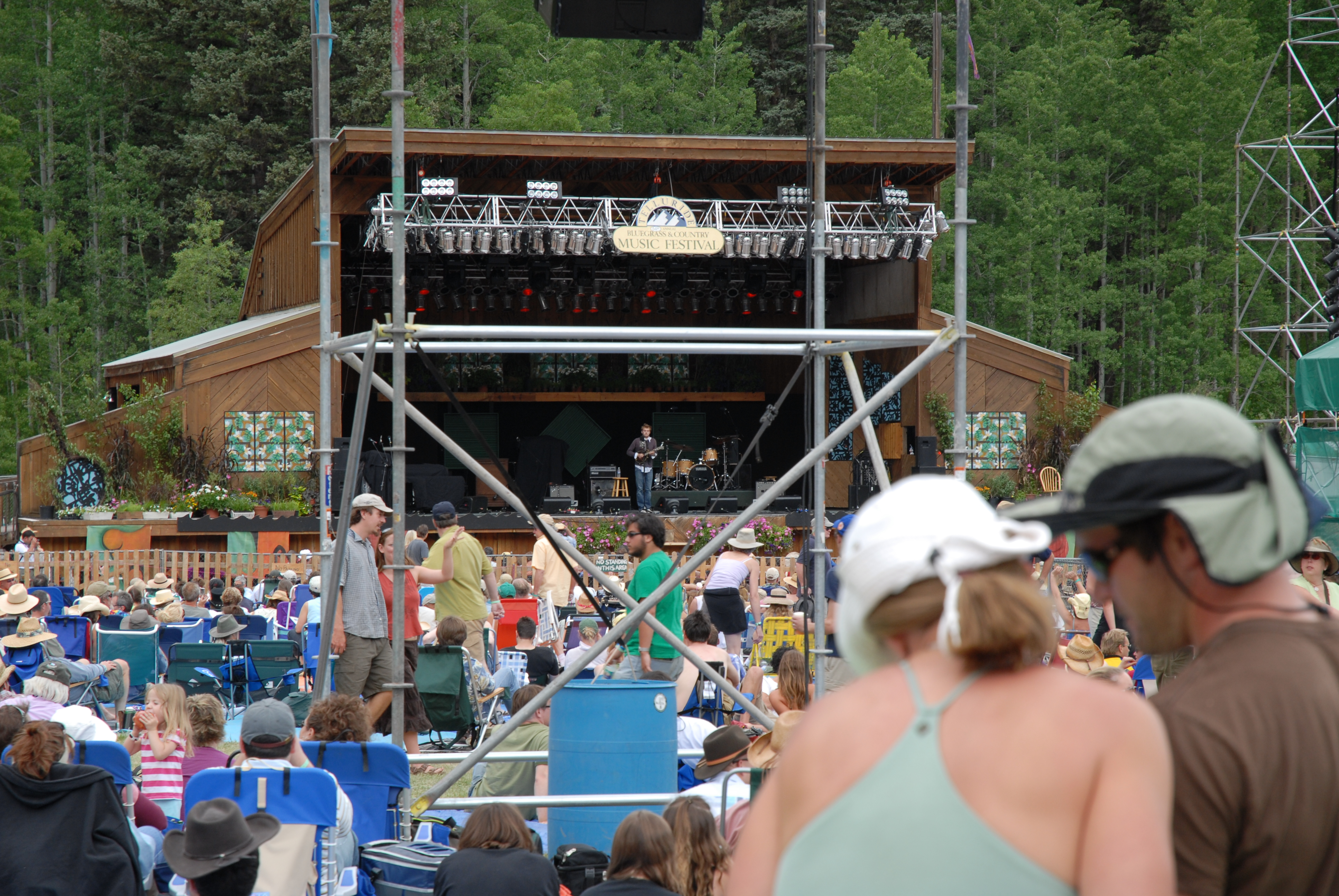
2007 Telluride BlueGrass Festival

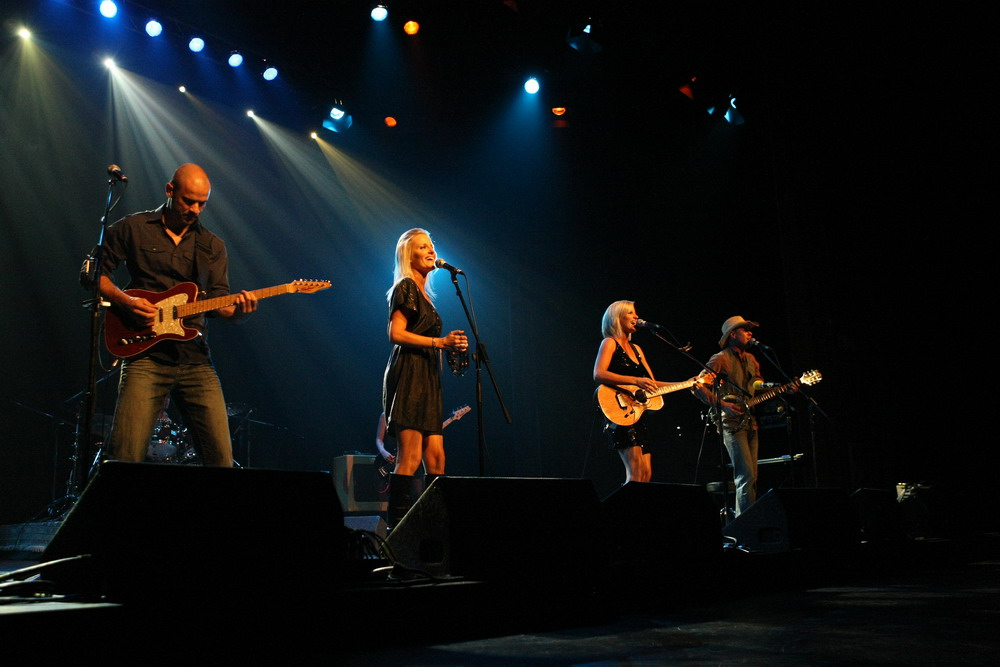
Tamworth Country Music Festival in Australia

Emily Smith and Andy Quelch - SoreFingers Halloween Tutor Concert, Nadine Uppal Theatre, Lord Wandsworth College, 24 October 2026

== See also ==
- List of music festivals
