= Central Canadian Bluegrass Awards =

Canadian musical awards

- Abbreviation: CCBA
- Formation: 1971
- Type: NGO
- Purpose: To promote the performance and enjoyment of bluegrass music in central Canada.
- Location: Huntsville, Ontario, Canada
- Region served: Central Canada
- Affiliations: Bluegrass Music Association of Canada

The Central Canadian Bluegrass Awards, established in 1979, are presented annually by the Northern Bluegrass Committee at its Huntsville, Ontario festival. This event also hosts the annual meeting of the Bluegrass Music Association of Canada (BMAC).

Nominations for the awards are made by leaders in the central Canadian bluegrass music scene, and four nominees are chosen in each category. Ballots with the names of the nominees are distributed to members of the Northern Bluegrass Committee, BMAC and local bluegrass music clubs and associations in central Canada.

In November, when the ballots have been counted, Ontario bluegrass bands gather for a three-day event, Friday to Sunday, at the Deerhurst Inn in Huntsville, Ontario. Participating bands are given the opportunity to showcase their talent during the weekend, and the awards are presented on Saturday evening in the hotel ballroom to a large audience. Bluegrass organizations throughout Ontario sponsor individual awards.

== History ==
The first awards were given out in 1979 at Ontario Place in Toronto by Pat and Jack Buttenham, who produced Canadian Bluegrass Review magazine. The 1980 and 1981 awards were presented at the Minkler Auditorium at Seneca College, and the 1982 awards ceremony was held at the Arlington Hotel in the town of Bright.

For the next ten years the awards festival was held at the Academy Theatre in Lindsay, Ontario. When the event outgrew the theatre, it was moved to Huntsville to the more spacious Deerhurst Inn.

After Canadian Bluegrass Review ceased publication, the Northern Bluegrass Committee took over the administration of the awards in the central region.

== Categories ==
The awards are given in the following categories:

- Banjo Player of the Year
- Fiddle Player of the Year
- Bass Player of the Year
- Guitar Player of the Year
- Mandolin Player of the Year
- Dobro Player of the Year
- Female Vocalist of the Year
- Male Vocalist of the Year
- Composer of the Year
- Promising Group of the Year
- Instrumental Group of the Year
- Recording of the Year
- Vocal Group of the Year *
- Gospel Group of the Year
- Overall Group of the Year
- Entertainer of the Year

== Festival ==
The awards ceremony forms part of an indoor weekend winter festival at which bluegrass musicians from central Canada gather to perform for their fans, network, jam, attend workshops and listen to guest bands from the United States and other parts of Canada.

== See also ==
- List of bluegrass music festivals
- List of country music festivals
