= Water Tower (band) =

American bluegrass band

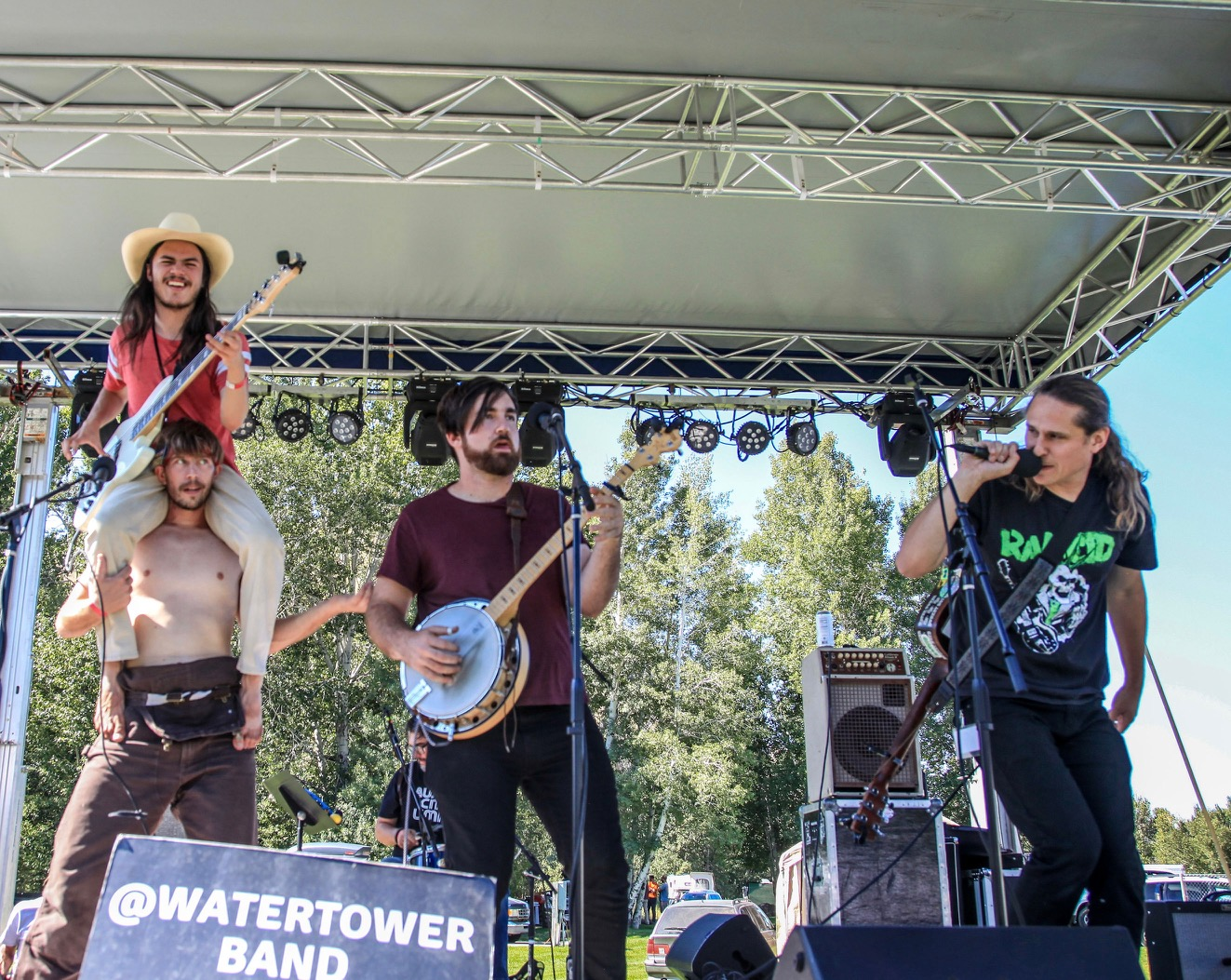

Background information
- Origin: Portland, Oregon
- Genres: Bluegrass, old-time, punk rock
- Years active: 2005-present
- Labels: Dutch Records, independent
- Spinoff of: The Water Tower Bucket Boys, Water Tower String Band
- Members: Kenny Feinstein; Tommy Drinkard; Jesse Blue Eads; Taylor Estes; John Seltzer
- Past members: Josh Rabie
- Website: watertowerband.com

Water Tower, formerly known as The Water Tower Bucket Boys and Water Tower String Band, is an American bluegrass, old time, and punk band from Los Angeles, California. The band was originally formed in Portland, Oregon in 2005 by Kenny Feinstein (guitar, lead vocals) and his neighbor, Josh Rabie (fiddle). They put out one album under the name Water Tower String Band and two albums as The Water Tower Bucket Boys, with various line ups, before changing their name to Water Tower in 2012. Rabie left the band in 2013 and Feinstein spent a year recording and putting out a solo album, an acoustic cover of My Bloody Valentine's Loveless called Loveless: Hurts to Love.

Guitarist Peter Daggatt, bassist Pat Norris, and drummer Harry Selick joined the band later in 2013 and the four-piece started recording Water Tower's first album. In 2014 the whole band relocated to Los Angeles, California and continued working on the album while busking on the streets to support themselves. Fly Around (2020) took seven years to complete and featured guest vocals from former Old Crow Medicine Show member Willie Watson, Bullets & Octane's Gene Louis, and the former singer of Black Flag, Ron Reyes. The album was co-produced by Don Bolles, the former drummer of the Germs/45 Grave, and solo artist Ariel Pink.

Tommy Drinkard (banjo, guitar), Jesse Blue Eads (banjo), and Joe "Juice" Berglund (fiddle, bass) became the main Water Tower line up with Feinstein in 2020, although Berglund was later replaced by Taylor Estes (bass, mandolin). Besides the main members, the band has a host of auxiliary members who occasionally perform with them. In 2021 they released a limited-edition bootleg album of all new songs called For the Owls and another bootleg called Live From Los Angeles in 2023.

Water Tower is known for playing modern bluegrass music mixed with old-time and punk rock influences. They have opened for and played festivals alongside bands as varied as Against Me!, T.S.O.L., Molly Tuttle, and John Craigie. The band has a DIY attitude and many of their albums are self-released. They prefer to book their own shows and tours, and a lot of their time is spent playing for passing cars at freeway off-ramps around Los Angeles. Water Tower is very active in the local bluegrass scene. The band itself functions as a collective, with members playing in various side projects. Lead singer/guitarist Feinstein's other credits include playing on and co-producing Rosy Nolan's EP Footprints and Broken Branches with Tim Armstrong from Rancid, playing fiddle in Coffey Anderson's band and appearing in Anderson's Netflix show Country Ever After, and most recently, playing on and co-writing two songs on Nick Hexum's solo EP Waxing Nostalgic.

== History ==
=== Background (2005–2012) ===
In 2005 guitarist/vocalist Kenny Feinstein formed the band The Water Tower Bucket Boys in Portland, Oregon with his neighbor, Josh Rabie on fiddle. They named the band after the water tower in the woods behind Feinstein's house that served as a gathering place for the local teenagers to hang out and play music. The second half of the name was inspired by the DIY washtub bass, or gutbucket, played by their first bass player. The Water Tower Bucket Boys recorded and independently released two full-length albums and two EPs, as well as one early album under the name Water Tower String Band. In 2012 the band changed their name to Water Tower.

=== Against Me! tour and solo work (2012–2013) ===
In November 2012 Water Tower was chosen to open for the punk band Against Me! on a tour of the Southeastern US. A year later Rabie left the band and Feinstein decided to take some time off to record a solo album. The album, entitled Loveless: Hurts to Love, was an acoustic cover of My Bloody Valentine's Loveless. Feinstein called Loveless “an obsession of mine”. He was determined to pull apart the original album layer by layer and recreate it in its entirety using mainly traditional bluegrass instruments such as acoustic guitar, mandolin, and fiddle. To do this, he enlisted the help of his friend Jeff Kazor from The Crooked Jades and engineer Bruce Kaphan, and together they created an “acoustic wall of sound” effect to emulate the distorted, dreamlike quality of the original album. Loveless: Hurts to Love was released on the label Fluff & Gravy in September 2013 to favorable reviews.

=== Fly Around (2013–2020) ===
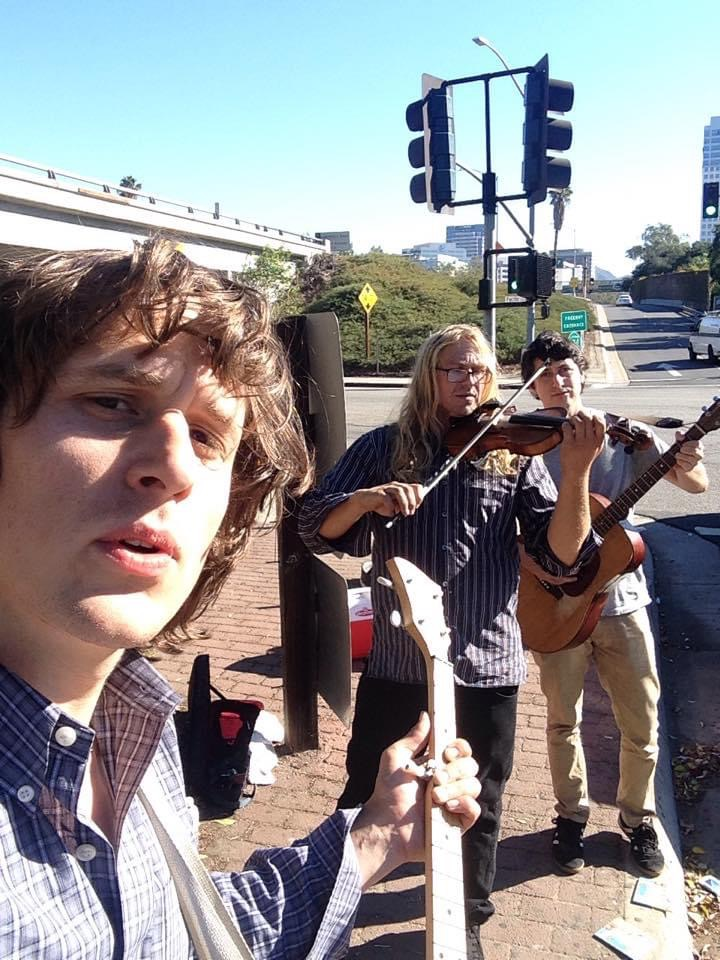
Kenny Feinstein, Pat Norris, and Peter Daggatt busking by a freeway in Los Angeles in 2014.

Following the release of his solo album, Feinstein turned his focus back towards Water Tower. He called up some old musician friends and recruited them to join the band. The new lineup became: Peter Daggatt on guitar, Pat Norris on bass, Harry Selick, the son of director Henry Selick, on drums, and Feinstein on lead vocals, guitar, fiddle, and mandolin. Together they began work on a new album which would eventually become Fly Around. The band reached out to Don Bolles, formerly of punk rock bands the Germs and 45 Grave, and he flew up to Portland to produce the album. They started recording the tracks for Fly Around at Deer Lodge Studios. It was originally meant to be done as a live studio album and only take a few weeks, but it would end up turning into a much bigger project than anyone could have imagined.

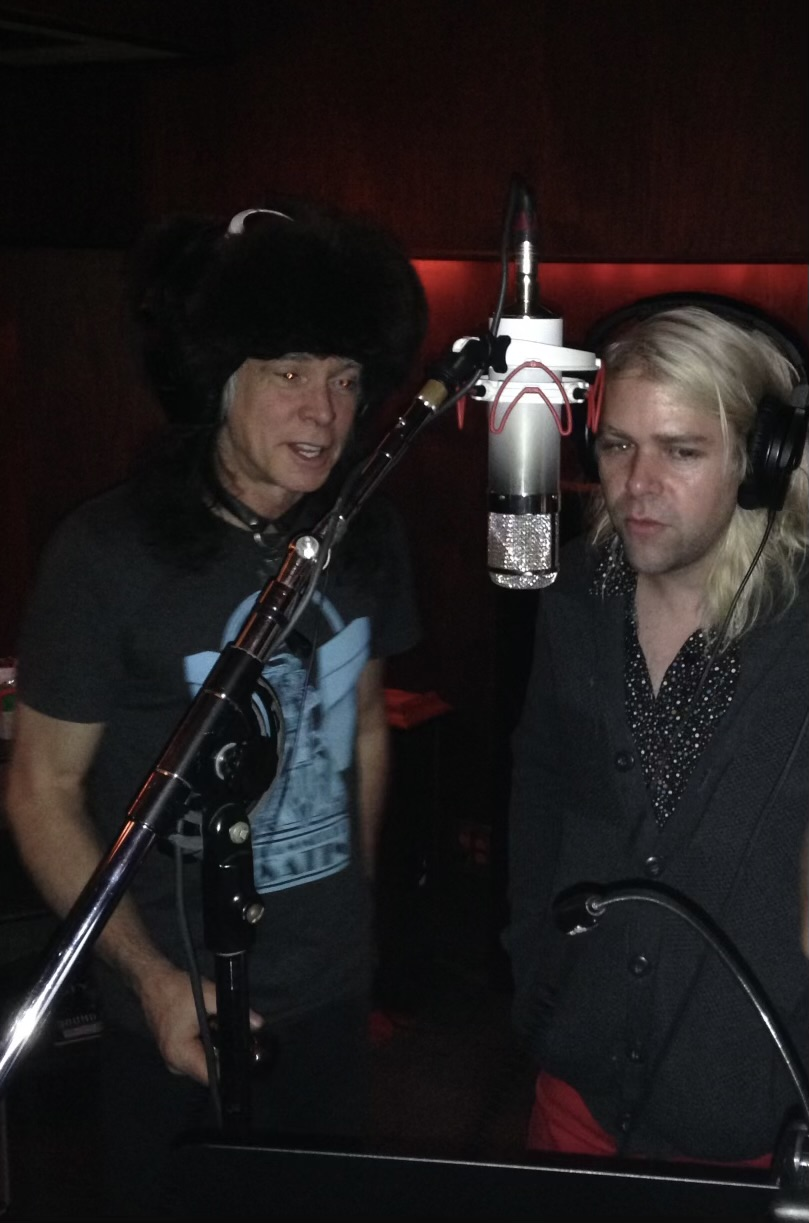
Don Bolles and Ariel Pink at Nightbird Studios in Hollywood working on Fly Around in 2015.

In 2014 Feinstein, on the suggestion of Bolles, moved himself and the band to Los Angeles, California. Work on the album was relocated to Nightbird Studios in Hollywood and Ariel Pink was brought on as co-producer. Fly Around would end up taking 7 years to complete with the help of a crowdfunding campaign and the support of a record label, Dutch Records. In addition to co-producing, Bolles and Pink also both play several instruments on the album. Bolles called Fly Around a “concept album” and described it as featuring “traditional bluegrass/old-time…along with some other elements – rock, psychedelia, pop, punk, and even a semi-ambient synth and SFX interlude”. The title track “Fly Around” features guest backing vocals from Willie Watson, formerly of Old Crow Medicine Show, and Gene Louis from Bullets and Octane. The last song on the record is a punk influenced track, aptly titled “Anthem”, which is sung by Feinstein and former Black Flag singer Ron Reyes. The animated music video for “Anthem” was done by Rodd Perry and it depicts black and white cartoon versions of the band floating down the river on a raft from Portland to Los Angeles, where they meet up with Bolles and Reyes. The video was shown at the Portland Film Festival. Fly Around was released on April 24, 2020, in the United States.

During this time, Water Tower would spend 20–40 hours a week busking on the side of various freeways and off-ramps around Los Angeles to support themselves. In 2016 Feinstein was hired to play fiddle in Coffey Anderson's band, and he appeared in Anderson's Netflix reality show Country Ever After. Water Tower also appeared as the wedding band in an episode of another Netflix reality show called Say I Do in 2019. That same year, Feinstein worked as co-producer on Rosy Nolan's EP Footprints and Broken Branches with punk musician Tim Armstrong of the band Rancid. He also played fiddle, mandolin, guitar, bass, and provided backing vocals for the album.

=== For the Owls (2020–2022) ===
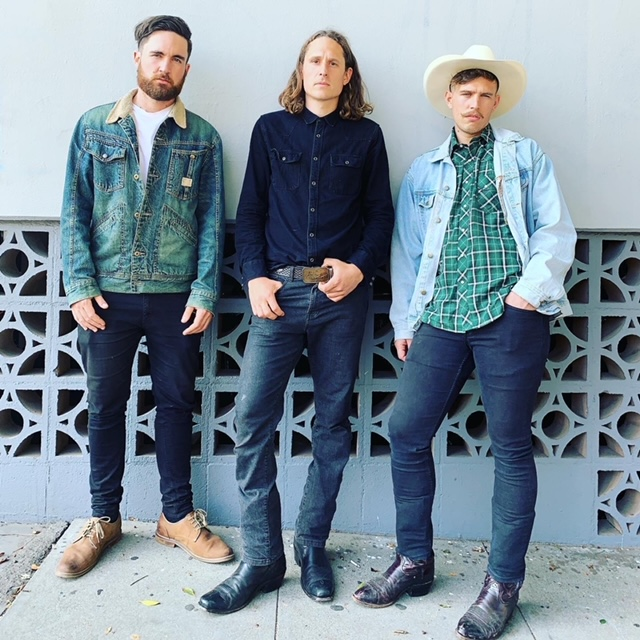
Water Tower's new line up featuring Tommy Drinkard, Kenny Feinstein, and Joe "Juice" Berglund in 2020.

In 2017 Feinstein met Joe “Juice” Berglund working in his neighbor's yard and asked him to join the band on fiddle and bass. Berglund is a self-taught musician who had been traveling the country and living out of his car prior to that. A year later the band met Joanne Ledesma who would become their manager. Tommy Drinkard met Feinstein by chance when he was invited to a jam at his house. He stuck around and became the band's banjo player in 2019 after taking lessons from Feinstein. Drinkard's first gig with Water Tower was the 2019 Huck Finn Jubilee, which Feinstein also performed as MC for. By 2020 Berglund and Drinkard would replace Daggatt, Norris, and Selick as the main line up, although the others would continue to play in Water Tower occasionally.

During the COVID-19 pandemic in 2020 the trio continued the practice of busking on the street to practice and make money. They also started streaming online every day to build their fan base. One of their online livestreams was a show hosted by Feinstein and Drinkard called Producing the Internet during which they would invite their fans to participate in the songwriting process with them. They played the virtual Topanga Banjo & Fiddle Contest & Folk Festival that year and Drinkard won first place in the intermediate banjo category.

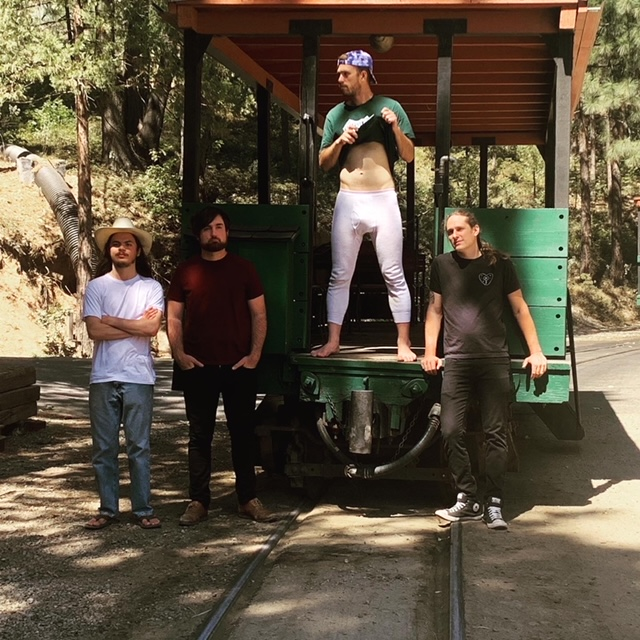
Jesse Blue Eads on a tour of the West Coast with Tommy Drinkard, Joe "Juice" Berglund, and Kenny Feinstein in September 2021.

It was while busking that Water Tower met another new member, Jesse Blue Eads, a young banjo player and electric bassist who had dropped out of college to pursue music. One day he got a call from a friend, letting him know that someone was in his usual busking spot in Hermosa Beach. It turned out to be the band and the four of them became fast friends. They asked Eads to join them on their next tour of the West Coast in summer 2021. One of the shows on this tour was presented by Thompson Guitars near their workshop in Sisters, Oregon. Feinstein, who plays a custom Thompson dreadnought with an extra-large sound hole inspired by bluegrass legends Clarence White and Tony Rice, is a featured musician on the Preston Thompson Guitars website. They also played at Summer's End – The Draper Rendezvous festival in Hailey, Idaho with Sarah Shook & the Disarmers and John Craigie. When they returned from touring, Feinstein and Drinkard started hosting a monthly bluegrass open mic event at Silverlake Lounge in Silver Lake called “Hillbilly Hype House”.

The following year, Water Tower released another album, a limited-edition bootleg called For the Owls. It is dedicated to their fans, whom they call “the owls”. The album consists of live studio recordings of new songs and was available for purchase during their tour that summer. The band played the main stage at the 2022 Topanga Banjo Fiddle Contest & Folk Festival in May alongside AJ Lee & Blue Summit as part of the tour. They also did a session at Paste Studio Tahoe for Paste Magazine with Matt Axton, Hoyt Axton's son. In October the band played at the Huck Finn Jubilee and taught workshops. In December, Feinstein hosted a house show in Echo Park featuring flat-pick guitarist Jake Eddy and Jordan Tice. The show served as Eddy's California premier.

=== Live from Los Angeles (2023–present) ===
At the start of January 2023, Water Tower played pop star Katy Perry's New Year's Eve party at the Carriage & Western Arts Museum in Santa Barbara, California. The party was a western themed costume party featuring music and line dancing. Katy Perry shared images from the party and a video of Water Tower's performance on her Instagram page. Later that month, the band played the CBA Great 48 jam in Bakersfield, California.

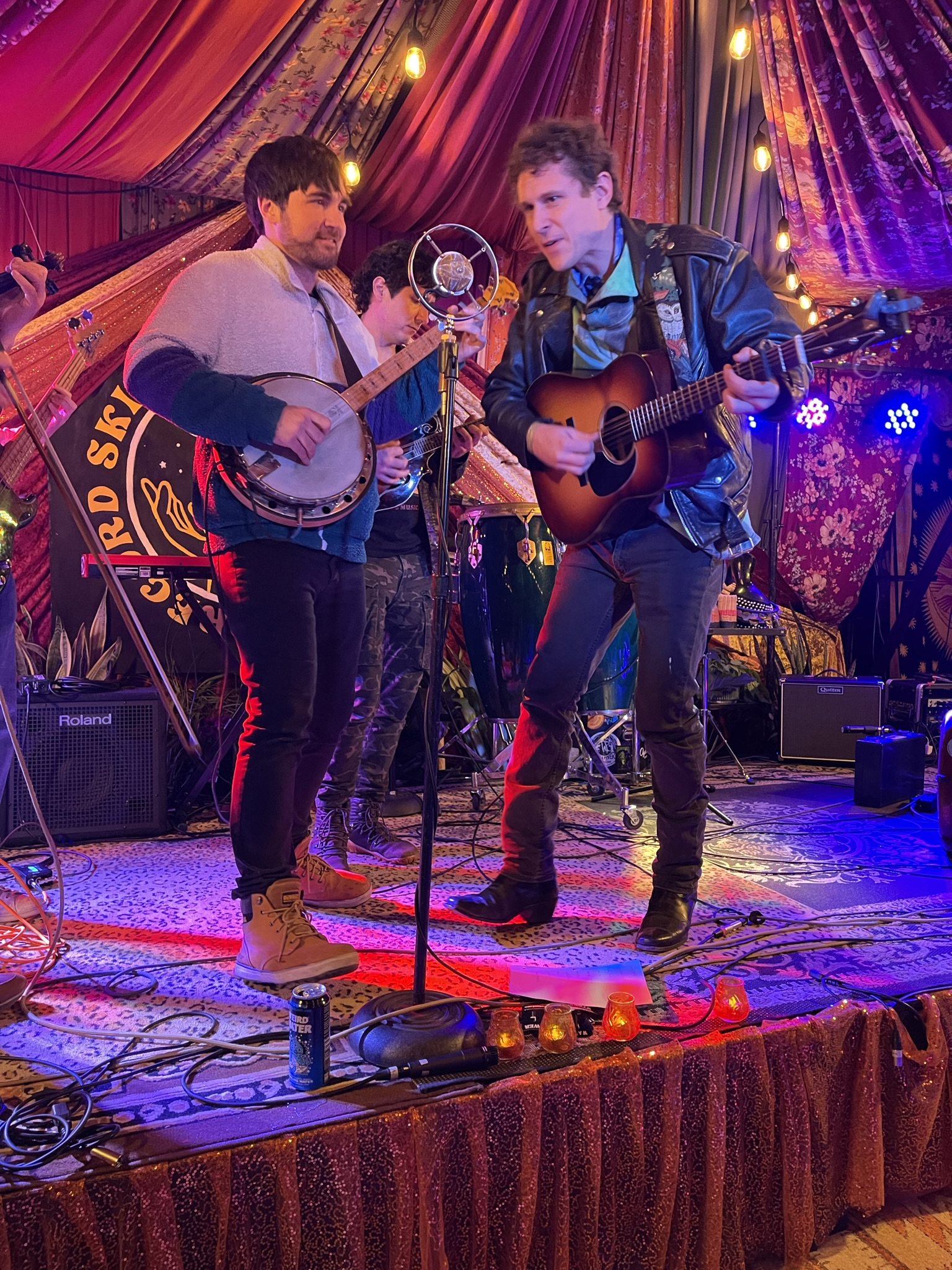
Tommy Drinkard and Kenny Feinstein playing a Jam in the Van/Skip the Record event in February 2023.

On February 3, Water Tower released the first single from their upcoming album Live from Los Angeles called “Take Me Back”. Ahead of the song's release, celebrity friends and fans of the band including rapper Riff Raff, singer Mark McGrath from the band Sugar Ray, the bassist Bootsy Collins from Parliament-Funkadelic, and Nick Hexum from 311 recorded shout-out videos urging others to listen to the single. On March 10 they released the second single from the album, a cover of the Flatt and Scruggs song "My Little Girl in Tennessee." Live from Los Angeles was released as a bootleg on August 11. The album was recorded all in one day at Palomino Studios in Los Angeles after the band returned home from a two month tour the previous summer.

Water Tower played the main stage at the CBA Father's Day Festival in Grass Valley, California along with Molly Tuttle & The Golden Highway in June 2023. In August Water Tower traveled to the UK and Ireland for a month-long tour. That October they played the Huck Finn Jubilee for the fifth year in a row.

In January 2024 the band gave an "electric performance" at the NAMM Show at the Anaheim Convention Center. A few months later in March, they opened for The Brothers Comatose at a sold out show at the Venice West in Santa Monica. In May the band returned to the main stage at the 2024 Topanga Banjo Fiddle Contest & Folk Festival. They also provided backing support at the festival for viral old-time musician and buck dancer Hillary Klug. That August they performed at the Good Old Fashioned Bluegrass Festival in San Benito County with special guest Jack Tuttle, Molly Tuttle's father.

In September Water Tower made their debut at IBMA. The band was an official showcase band and played several showcases around Raleigh, North Carolina as part of the annual IBMA Bluegrass Ramble. They also played at the Industry Awards Luncheon on behalf of the California Bluegrass Association.

In January 2025 they performed at the NAMM Show for the second year in a row.

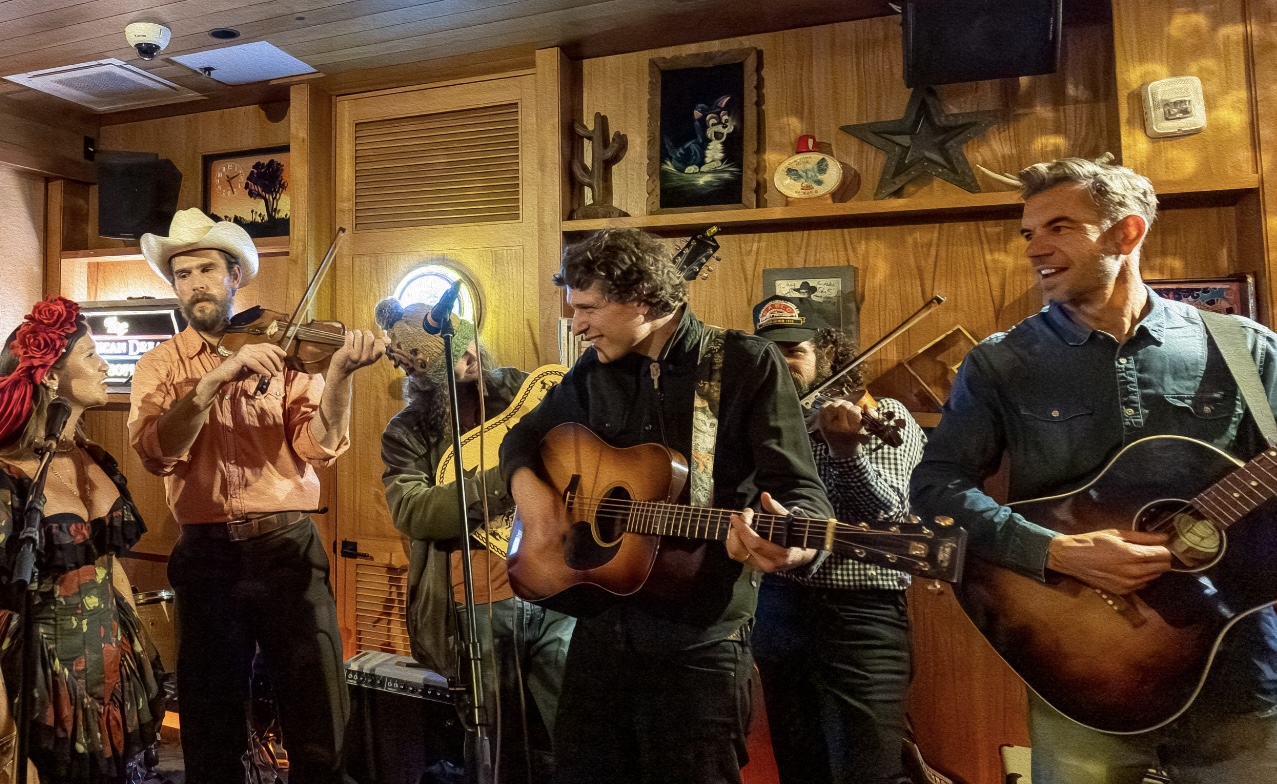
Kenny Feinstein performing with Sierra Ferrell and Nick Hexum in Hollywood in February 2025.

The next month, Kenny Feinstein introduced Nick Hexum and Sierra Ferrell onstage moments before the three performed an impromptu song with Water Tower and other musicians at the Desert 5 Spot in Hollywood. Bluegrass Today called Feinstein a “cult hero in the underground folk-punk and bluegrass scenes” and remarked “we are excited to see what these three come up with together.” Later that month, Hexum’s first Americana influenced EP Waxing Nostalgic was released, which featured two songs that Feinstein co-wrote and played mandolin, fiddle, and acoustic guitar on.

Water Tower is slated to appear at several festivals in 2025 including Daniel Donato's Camp Cosmic, Strawberry Music Festival, and the Telluride Bluegrass Festival.

== Musical style and legacy ==
Water Tower's music is often described as a combination of modern bluegrass and old-time with punk influences. This is apparent in their first album Fly Around which features traditional bluegrass and old-time melodies and instruments as well as modern, punk, and psychedelic elements. Feinstein also invited punk legend Don Bolles to co-produce the album with garage rock artist Ariel Pink, to give it more of a punk rock edge. The last track on the album, “Anthem” is sung by both Feinstein and Ron Reyes, the former lead singer of punk rock band Black Flag. Feinstein counts punk bands like Black Flag and Rancid as among his earliest musical inspirations. Water Tower was asked to open for the punk band Against Me! in 2012 and to play the Punk Rock Bowling Festival along with bands like T.S.O.L., Steve Soto, and Wanda Jackson in 2013. The band's live performances feature fast playing and at times, moshing.

At the same time, Water Tower remains loyal to their bluegrass and old-time roots. Feinstein recalls how the band started out just trying to “recreate” the traditional music “as faithfully as possible” as a Foghorn Stringband cover band before delving into modern bluegrass and eventually evolving to have their own unique, punk influenced take on it. Their main bluegrass influences besides Foghorn Stringband are Clarence White and Tony Rice.

"If Earl Scruggs was a skater from Portland, who had a passion for the free-spirited thrash of NOFX and fell in love with the community and earnest nature of bluegrass, you would have Water Tower," according to a recent article in Bluegrass Unlimited.

Some themes that appear in Water Tower's songs include hope of recovery, the good and bad times in life, love, acceptance, and death. Feinstein says their inspiration for songwriting comes from the things they have seen and experienced either while playing music on tour or out on the streets while busking at home.

Water Tower also has a punk rock, DIY attitude off-stage, preferring to independently record and release albums and schedule their own house shows, events, and tours with friends in the scene. When they aren't working in the studio or touring, the band can be found busking by the sides of streets or at freeway exits around Los Angeles. During the COVID-19 pandemic they also turned to livestreaming their music online daily for fans as another way to support themselves.

Every member of the band plays multiple different instruments and participates in different side projects in addition to Water Tower. Drinkard describes the band as “a kind of music collective” that shares a “mutual fan base".

Water Tower’s fans are known as “the Owls”, a name that was inspired by an owl light on Feinstein’s shelf during the pandemic livestreams. Fans began sending owl themed items as gifts and the band started using images of owls on their merchandise.

== Band members ==
=== Current members ===
- Kenny Feinstein – lead vocals, guitar, fiddle, mandolin (2005–present)
- Tommy Drinkard – banjo, guitar, vocals (2019–present)
- Jesse Blue Eads – banjo, electric bass, vocals (2020–present)
- Taylor Estes – bass, mandolin, vocals (2020–present)
- John Seltzer – mandolin, vocals (2024-present)

=== Auxiliary members ===
- Joe “Juice” Berglund – double bass, fiddle, vocals (2017–present)
- Walter Spencer – double bass (2012–present)
- Korey Simeone – fiddle (2021–present)
- Peter Daggatt – guitar, vocals (2013-2020 as main member, 2020-present as auxiliary)
- Pat Norris – bass (2013-2020 as main member, 2020-present as auxiliary)
- Harry Selick – drums (2013-2020 as main member, 2020-present as auxiliary)

=== Former members ===
- Josh Rabie – fiddle, backing vocals (2005-2013)

== Discography ==
=== Studio albums ===
The Squid and the Fiddle (as Water Tower String Band) (self-released, 2008)

Catfish on the Line (as The Water Tower Bucket Boys) (self-released, 2009)

Sole Kitchen (as The Water Tower Bucket Boys) (self-released, 2010)

Fly Around (Dutch Records, 2020)

=== Live ===
Water Tower Live at Skip the Record (Skip the Record, 2023)

=== Bootlegs ===
For the Owls (self-released, 2022)

Live from Los Angeles (self-released, 2023)

Live from Weiser (self-released, 2024)

=== EPs ===
EEL-P (as The Water Tower Bucket Boys) (self-released, 2009)

Where the Crow Don't Fly (as The Water Tower Bucket Boys) (Type Foundry, 2011)
