= In the Mouth of the Young =

Studio album by Bullets and Octane
- Released: April 11, 2006
- Genre: Hard rock, punk rock, hardcore punk
- Length: 40:10
- Label: RCA
- Producer: Page Hamilton

Bullets and Octane chronology
| The Revelry (2004) | In the Mouth of the Young (2006) | Song for the Underdog (2007) |

Singles from In the Mouth of the Young
- 1. "Save Me Sorrow" Released: 2006; 2. "I Ain't Your Savior" Released: 2006; 3. "Caving In" Released: 2006

Professional ratings
Review scores
| Source | Rating |
|---|---|
| Allmusic | link |

In the Mouth of the Young is the second full-length and first major label album by the band Bullets and Octane. The album was released on April 11, 2006 on RCA and produced by Helmet guitarist Page Hamilton. It was the band's first and only release for RCA.

The band filmed their music video for the song "Caving In" from In the Mouth of the Young on October 29, 2006. The video was written and directed by Nick Lambrou (Goldfinger, The Used, Adair).

"Save Me Sorrow" was used as a theme song for WrestleMania 22.

The song "Cancer California" was featured in the Sony Computer Entertainment video game, ATV Offroad Fury Pro.

"I Ain't Your Savior" was featured in WWE SmackDown vs. Raw 2007, MotorStorm: Pacific Rift, and Drillbit Taylor.

== Track listing ==
1. "Going Blind" - 3:08
2. "My Disease" - 3:02
3. "Save Me Sorrow" - 3:29
4. "I Ain't Your Savior" - 3:11
5. "Cancer California" - 3:10
6. "Last Mistake" - 3:46
7. "Signed in Alcohol" - 1:22
8. "Queen Mirage" - 3:40
9. "Caving In" - 3:16
10. "Bathroom Floor" - 4:00
11. "All Hail Halo" - 4:01
12. "Mine Now" - 4:05

== See also ==
- List of controversial album art
