= Nick Lambrou =

American music video director/editor (born 1983)

Nick Lambrou (born 1983 in Poplar Bluff, Missouri, raised in St.Louis, Missouri) is an American music video director/editor. He made his first major label music video for Goldfinger at the age of 20. The following year, he directed and edited the live portion of Live in the Lou/Bassassins which was certified Gold by the RIAA in late 2005, along with producing and editing a B-Sides & Rarities DVD for the Deftones. In 2006, he created Berth, a live concert and behind the scenes segment for The Used which was also certified Gold in 2007, and a music video for Bullets and Octane's "Caving in". He has since been touring around the world with Thirty Seconds to Mars, documenting their 2007 international tour. In the summer of 2007 he accompanied 30 Seconds to Mars on a trip to the arctic where he documented their shooting of a music video on glaciers and icebergs in Greenland. In late 2007 he directed and edited a live concert DVD for Saosin entitled Come Close, and edited a music video for Linkin Park's single "Given Up" in early 2008.

== Videography ==
=== Music videos ===
==== Director ====
"Caving In" - Bullets and Octane

"The Diamond Ring" - Adair

"Can't Stop the Radio" - Beat Union

"Wasted" - Goldfinger

"I Want" - Goldfinger

==== Editor ====
"Given Up" - Linkin Park

"Caving In" - Bullets and Octane

"The Diamond Ring" - Adair

"Root" - Deftones

"Engine#9" - Deftones

"Wasted" - Goldfinger

"I Want" - Goldfinger

"Too Many Nights" - Goldfinger

=== DVD ===
Come Close - Saosin

Berth - The Used

B-Sides & Rarities - Deftones

Live in the Lou/Bassassins - Story of the Year

Live at Chain Reaction - Bullets and Octane

=== Television ===
"Making the Video" - Ashes Divide, "The Stone"

"Making the Video" - The Bravery, "Believe"

"Making the Video" - Story of the Year, "Take Me Back"

"Making the Video" - Story of the Year, "We Don't Care Anymore"

"Making the Video" - The Used, "I Caught Fire"

"Making the Video" - Head Automatica, "Beating Hearts Baby"

"Story of the Year - Live in the Lou/Bassassins Special" on Fuse

=== Internet ===
"Taste of Chaos" - Tour Diaries: Senses Fail, Saosin, Thirty Seconds to Mars
