= Paramount Movie Ranch =

Television and film studio located in Agoura Hills, California

Paramount Ranch
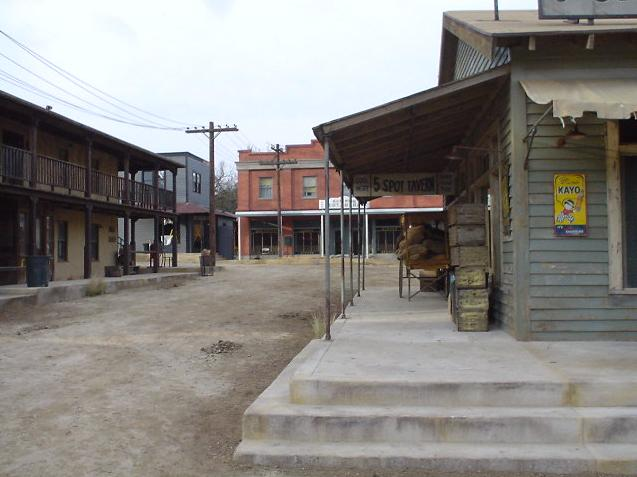

General information
- Type: Film and television production studio
- Location: 2903 Cornell Road; Agoura Hills, California; 60618
- Coordinates: 34.1181°N 118.7525°W
- Opening: 1927
- Owner: National Park Service

Paramount Ranch is a historic movie ranch and public park located in Agoura Hills, California. It is owned by the United States National Park Service and is listed on the National Register of Historic Places as a historic landmark.

== History ==
In 1927, Paramount Studios purchased a 2,700-acre (11 km^{2}) ranch on Medea Creek in the Santa Monica Mountains near Agoura Hills, between Malibu and the Conejo Valley. The studio built numerous large-scale sets on the ranch, including a huge replica of early San Francisco, an Old West town, and a Welsh mining village (built by 20th Century Fox for How Green Was My Valley (1941), and later redressed (with coal mine tipple removed) as a French village for use in The Song of Bernadette (1943), and again used for The Inspector General (1949)). Western town sets posed as Tombstone, Arizona, and Dodge City, Kansas, as well as Tom Sawyer's Missouri, 13th-century China, and many other locales and eras around the world.

It is now Paramount Ranch Park in the Santa Monica Mountains National Recreation Area. The National Park Service took over a section of the lot in 1980 and restored the sets, working from old black and white photographs. The NPS website lists movie and TV productions filmed there. The Western Town was constructed during 1954 when Paramount purchased (Academy Award-winning) sets previously used at RKO Pictures Encino Movie Ranch, and was a location for some of the era's popular TV Westerns, including The Cisco Kid and Gunsmoke. This remaining set of buildings continued to be used in filming, notably for the Dr. Quinn, Medicine Woman television series and the HBO series Carnivàle, and more recently Westworld.

Paramount Ranch was also used as the primary filming location for the 2010 revisionist Western comedy film Big Money Rustlas produced by Psychopathic Video, the home video production arm of the Psychopathic Records label owned by the Insane Clown Posse.

Paramount Ranch was most recently used as a filming location for The Mentalist, Weeds, The X-Files, Hulu's Quickdraw and season 3 of Escape the Night, a YouTube Premium show by Joey Graceffa.

The Paramount Ranch was also the home of the original Renaissance Pleasure Faire of Southern California from 1966 to 1989, the home of the Topanga Banjo•Fiddle Contest, held each May, and the eponymously titled Paramount Ranch, an alternative art fair founded from 2014 to 2016.

The Paramount Ranch structures suffered near-total destruction during the November 2018 Woolsey Fire. By that time, it was managed by the National Park Service, but some filming had been done here for Westworld Seasons 1 and 2. Parts of the 2015 movie Bone Tomahawk were filmed here. The National Park Service launched a campaign on November 16, 2018 called The Paramount Project, to aid in the reconstruction efforts to rebuild Paramount Ranch.
