= The Senton Bombs =

English rock band

- Origin: Blackpool, England
- Genres: Rock, hard rock, punk rock, southern rock, country
- Years active: 2004–present
- Labels: Regolith Records, 7Hard, Holier Than Thou, STP Records
- Members: Joey Class, Damien Kage, Scott Mason, Johhny Gibbons
- Past members: Ronnie Bomb, Jimmy Kage, Josh Bellew
- Website: www.sentonbombs.com

The Senton Bombs are an English rock band formed in Blackpool, Lancashire in 2004. Their musical range covers alternative rock, hard rock, punk rock, southern rock and country.

== History ==
Briefly known as The Terrorists, the original line-up consisted of Joey Class (L.J. Kilgallon) on bass/vocals, brothers Damien Kage and Jimmy Kage on guitars, and Ronnie Bomb on drums. Following several demo recordings, settling on their current line-up with Johnny Gibbons and Scott Mason joining on lead guitar and drums respectively, the band released their debut album Sweet Chin Music in 2009.

Their second album Gambit followed in 2012, with reviewers stating it showed more maturity with a wider variety of musically technical songs. In 2014 the band released their third album Chapter Zero, growing their reputation as a rising punk infused rock & roll band, followed by the EP Phantom High in 2014 on independent labels STP and Holier Than Thou Records.

In 2015, following an endorsement from Vintage Guitars, the Bombs toured their new single "Mainstream" across the UK, Denmark, Holland and Germany. The follow-up single "Train Wreck" received national radio play on Planet Rock and Kerrang. In 2016 they signed a deal with German label 7Hard for the international release of their fourth studio album Mass Vendetta, which garnered multiple comparisons to Guns N' Roses.

Following several festival appearances and support slots with the likes of The Supersuckers and Bullets & Octane, the Bombs released their fifth studio album Outsiders in late 2018.

In 2020 the band released new singles "Be What You Want" and "Blue Sunset" from a forthcoming sixth album. Following several more singles, the album "Aerial Threat" was released in March 2021. Reviewers praised the albums diversity and highlighted the "90s vibe", noting the Blackpool quartet had met the high expectations from their earlier releases, offering lyrics everyone can relate to - ‘Age is just the counting of rotations round the sun, don’t let the growing number spoil the fun’

== Discography ==
=== Studio albums ===
- Sweet Chin Music (2009)
- Gambit (2012)
- Chapter Zero (2013)
- Mass Vendetta (2016)
- Outsiders (2018)
- Aerial Threat (2021)

=== Compilation albums ===
- 13 Years Later (2017)
- Black Chapter (2018)

=== Singles and EPs ===
- "Darkest Horse" (2014)
- "Nothing Quite Like This" (2014)
- "Chapter Zero" (2014)
- Phantom High EP (2014)
- "Lights Over Phoenix" (2015)
- "Black Chariot" (2015)
- "Mainstream" (2015)
- "Trailblazer" (2016)
- "Train Wreck" (2016)
- "Devil Trilogy" (2016)
- "Outsiders" (2018)
- "Who We Are" (2018)
- "Be What You Want" (2020)
- "Blue Sunset" (2020)
- "Lake" (2020)
- "Coaster" (2020)
- "Dwelling in the Past" (2021)

=== Various artist compilations ===
- The Ugly Truth About Blackpool Vol.2 (2006)
- Spit & Sawdust (2009)
- This Is Why We Do It (2012)
- Lambination IV - Deadlamb Records (2013)
- Classic Rock Magazine Issue 209 - One Nation Under Groove (2015)
- Breakout Magazine - Shut Up And Listen (2016)
