= Songwriter networks =

Songwriter's networks in the United States of America are generally volunteer-run or non-profit organizations that support the networking of songwriters in the area. The organization may be an active group in the community, sponsoring seminars, meetings, showcase performance events, and other gatherings in which songwriters can socialize and build valuable business contacts.

Songwriter network organizations are opportunities for music industry representatives to meet with songwriters and discuss their experiences in the industry.

In a songwriting network, a group of songwriters can:

- A) Learn the importance of networking with each other
- B) Meet guest speakers from many different areas of the music industry or music business.
- C) Encourage one another and share tips and advice
- D) Collaborate with others in the network as composers, lyricists, producers, etc.

== See also ==
- Los Angeles Songwriters Network
- Los Angeles Free Music Society
