= Bob Stane =

American businessman

- Born: 1934 (age 91–92); San Bernardino, California, United States
- Occupation: Businessman
- Known for: Founding several music and comedy venues in Southern California

Bob Stane (born 1934) is an American businessman. He is the founder and owner of the Coffee Gallery Backstage venue located at 2025 Lake Avenue in Altadena, California. Stane, along with Willard Chilcott, was a former owner of the legendary The Ice House folk music and comedy club located at 24 Mentor Avenue in Pasadena, California.

Stane also founded and owned the Upper Cellar coffee house in San Diego, California located at 6557 El Cajon Blvd.

Stane has been instrumental in helping to launch and continually support artists and entertainers like Steve Martin, the Nitty Gritty Dirt Band, John McEuen, The Dillards, The Association, John Stewart, The New Christy Minstrels, Mason Williams, the Smothers Brothers, Jack Linkletter, and Womenfolk among others.

== Early life and military service ==
Stane was born in San Bernardino, California in 1934. After attending San Diego State College, Stane entered the army. He was stationed near Monterey, California. Stane visited various coffeehouses including The Unicorn, L.A.'s first folk music coffee house, and developed an interest in getting involved in the coffee house entertainment business.

== Career ==
=== The Upper Cellar ===
In 1958, Stane was loaned $500 from a friend to open the Upper Cellar coffee house in San Diego located at 6557 El Cajon Blvd. Upper Cellar entertainers included Mason Williams, Edward Ruscha, Judy Henske, Scottsville Squirrel Barkers, Randy Sparks, and Cheech & Chong among others. The Upper Cellar allowed Stane to gain experience with promotion and publicity. His experience and success with the Upper Cellar prepared him for his many years as owner of the Ice House in Pasadena.

=== The Ice House ===
The Ice House opened in 1960. Performers from Stane's Upper Cellar also did shows at the Ice House. Stane personally took one of his performers to the Ice House to audition. Ice House owner Willard Chilcott was at the Ice House during that audition. After some discussion about the entertainment business Chilcott offered Stane the opportunity to run the Ice House. Stane responded that he would run the Ice House as a partner. Chilccott agreed and Stane became co-owner of the Ice House in 1961. Stane and Chilcott sold the Ice House in 1978.

=== Playboy Enterprises ===
In June 1962 Stane took a temporary leave of absence from running the Ice House to handle promotion and publicity work for the Playboy Enterprises in Chicago, Illinois. Stane returned to the Ice House in December 1962.

=== Coffee Gallery Backstage ===
Stane opened the Coffee Gallery Backstage (CGB) in 1998. The venue featured top-level entertainment, ranging from folk to jazz, seven nights a week. CGB went out of business in 2022.

== Publications ==
=== How to Run a Coffeehouse ===
How To Run a Coffeehouse was a book written by Bob Stane when he was owner of The Upper Cellar in San Diego to help other aspiring coffeehouse owners understand the business. The book was a spirited, yet shrewd series of observations on building a successful business from the ground up.

== Recognition ==
=== The Fork in the Road sculpture ===
In late October 2009 artist Ken Marshall created an 18 foot tall wooden fork sculpture, painted to look like metal, and installed it in Pasadena, California where Pasadena Avenue and St. Johns Avenue fork in honor of Bob Stane's 75th birthday. Because the fork was installed illegally it was taken down on June 10, 2010. After proper permits were obtained, the city returned the fork sculpture on October 21, 2011. This time it was set back a bit more on the island in order to give room for people to get out and take pictures. A ceremony was held at the time the fork was re-installed.

=== Best of the West Ambassador Award ===
In 2009 the western regional arm (FAR West) of Folk Alliance International (formerly known as the North American Folk Music & Dance Alliance) awarded Stane the Best of the West Ambassador Award, the organization's highest honor for non-musicians.

=== Topanga Banjo Fiddle Contest Music Legend Award ===
In 2012, Stane was named the Music Legend Award winner by the Topanga Banjo•Fiddle Contest and Folk Festival. Stane was recognized for his 53 years of promoting and preserving folk, bluegrass and old-time music along with providing quality entertainment and cultivating, encouraging and supporting artists in an award-winning series of venues starting in San Diego in 1958 at The Upper Cellar. From 1961 to 1978, most folk music fans, as well as countless musicians and performers, knew Bob's club in Pasadena, The Ice House, as the place where "everyone started." That tradition continues today at The Coffee Gallery Backstage in Altadena, California.

== See also ==
- The Songwriters Network
