= Patrick Baum =

Patrick Baum may refer to:

- Patrick Baum, member of Adair (band)
- Patrick Baum (table tennis) (born 1987), table tennis player from Germany
