= The Songwriter's Network =

The Songwriter's Network (SongNet) is a volunteer-run organization that supports the networking of songwriters in the Los Angeles, California area. Founded in October 1998, SongNet has sponsored monthly seminars in which a music industry related guest representative discusses their experience in the industry, and also conducts some songwriting critique of recorded works that attendees have brought with them. In addition to the monthly seminar, SongNet has sponsored a monthly singer-songwriter showcase, in which performers can perform 2 of their musical works for the audience.

== History ==
Linda Geleris. Photo by T. Honles.

SongNet is the brainchild of Los Angeles songwriter Linda Geleris. Geleris felt the isolation experienced by many creative people and in response, sought out other songwriters hoping to build careers in the music business. In the back of her "Songwriters Market" book, she found a listing for the National Academy of Songwriters (NAS), which at the time was meeting at the Hollywood Women's Club. As Linda Geleris tells it, "On the occasion of my second visit, I shared some of my M&M's with a woman sitting next to me, whose husband had just been tapped to score his first feature film. Four months later, the couple called me up and said that a song was needed for the opening scene. The next day, I 'auditioned' my song in the couples' apartment for the director, producer and music supervisor. It could not have fit the opening scene any better, and the next day the as-yet unrecorded song was recorded and immediately placed into the film. This scenario taught me the importance of networking, being personable and pleasant, and sharing M&M's whenever possible."

Forming a songwriters network seemed like the next logical step for Geleris. In a network, a group of songwriters could: A) Learn the importance of networking with each other B) Meet guest speakers from many different areas of the music business. C) Encourage one another and share tips and advice

At a music seminar, Linda had recently been introduced to a gentleman who co-founded TAXI, an independent A&R service company. She called him up and pitched her idea for hosting a network with music industry guest speakers, song critiques, and occasional open mics. During the spring and summer of 1999, the ideas evolved and the periodic conversations eventually led to a commitment from Michael Lederer and TAXI to sponsor the endeavor. The first meetings were held at Beantown, a coffee shop in Sierra Madre, California. Pete Luboff was one of the first speakers.

In April 2001, Thomas "Tommy" Honles and Jimi Yamagishi, who had been members since the beginning, joined Linda Geleris as partners to handle the rapid growth of the network. Geleris, Honles, and Yamagishi created a leadership core to expand the range of opportunities available, secure a presence in cyberspace, and to search for new avenues of support for SongNet members.

== Current activity ==
The Songwriter's Network currently meets bimonthly in Pasadena at the urban farm project, The Urban Homestead, at 631 Cypress ave, Pasadena, CA. The SongNet Showcase takes place on the 3rd Wednesday of each month. The first meeting in the month features an invited speaker from the music industry giving a brief presentation or talk, followed by an hour or more of discussion in a Q&A format. The second meeting is a music artist showcase event.

The organization makes the following statement on its website: "The SongNet Showcase is one of the most comfortable stages in Southern California to showcase your music! A place to test drive your new material and connect with other creatives; songwriters, artists, and performers! Sign up early if you want to play, 2 songs or 10 minutes per artist! No fee, no cover, in other words, FREE."

== Past Activities ==
By enlisting the help of promoter Bob Stane, SongNet originally found a home at the Coffee Gallery Backstage in Altadena, California. Stane has a legacy in the live entertainment business, most notably, his involvement in establishing The Ice House comedy club in Pasadena, California. In its Coffee Gallery Altadena location, a relatively short drive away from Hollywood, the organization found a unique meeting venue for the singer-songwriting community, with special relevance to those in he area, in greater Pasadena area, in the San Gabriel Valley, and further east.

Geleris and Yamagishi, with extensive contacts in the singer-songwriter community, provided contacts to start SongNet, and Honles was the information technology support and webmaster for the organization in 2001. Honles continued as webmaster for over 10 years until moving out of the area and transitioning the website to a new format and to a new volunteer webmaster.

In addition to the partners, volunteers from the singer-songwriter community and the SongNet membership have acted as singer-songwriter showcase coordinators, special event staff, and goodwill spokespersons. In April 2008, the organization revised its name to reflect its greater involvement in areas outside Los Angeles city proper, adopting simply "The Songwriters Network" instead of the Los Angeles Songwriter's Network.

Membership in the original organization existed on two levels, a free "basic" membership, and a paid membership that supported the SongNet organization financially, listed the paid member's media link on the organization's website, and offered discounts at certain other organization's events. The membership system transitioned to an all members free, open membership, and all donation based system, in order to simplify the administrative work and increase participation.
