= Gene Louis =

American singer

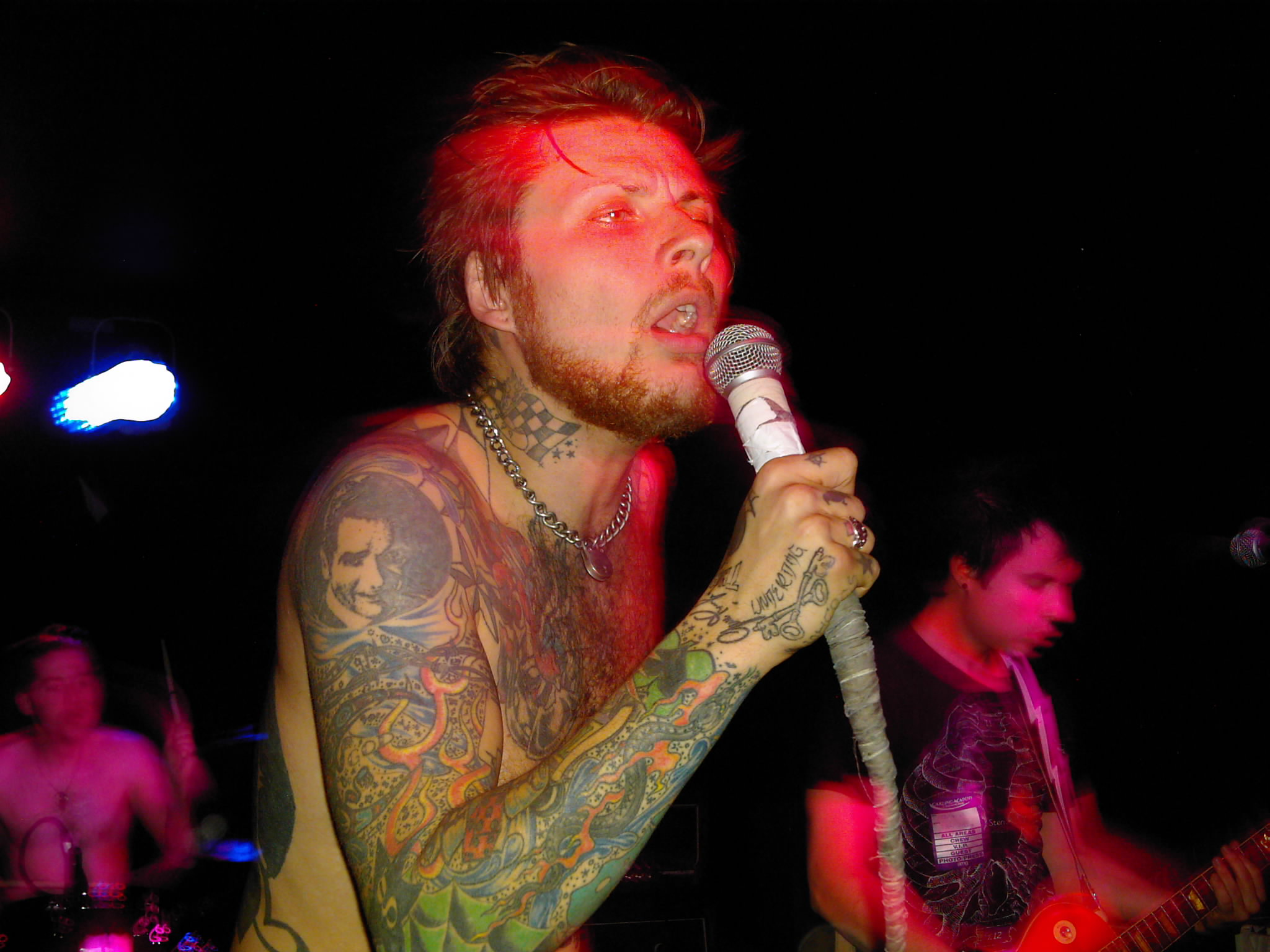
- Louis performing in 2007

Background information
- Also known as: Gene Bullets
- Origin: Orange County, California
- Genres: Hard rock
- Years active: 2004-present

Gene Louis (also known as Gene Bullets) is a vocalist, front-man of hard rock band Bullets and Octane, and former vocalist in Sex N Violence. He also has a solo project, releasing under his own name.

== History ==
Louis was raised in St. Louis, Missouri and taught to play drums by his jazz drummer father. Louis moved to Orange County, California with long-time friend and bassist Brent Clawson to start Bullets and Octane in 1998. Louis remained the band's drummer until the original lead singer quit and Louis stepped up to the mic, being replaced on drums by local punk rocker, Ty Smith, while James Daniel would later join on guitar.

== Career ==
Bullets and Octane released their debut album The Revelry through the Criterion Records imprint in 2004. The album was produced by ex Guns N' Roses guitarist Gilby Clarke, who now forms part of Rock Star Supernova. Their second album, In the Mouth of the Young was released in 2006 after the band moved to RCA Records. This record was produced by Helmet frontman Page Hamilton.

The band have opened for Avenged Sevenfold and CKY, and played on the Family Values Tour 2006, in company of Korn, Flyleaf and Deftones. They toured with Unwritten Law, Zebrahead, and Social Distortion and recently finished a UK tour with The Knives.

In December 2007, Gene announced on his MySpace that he is to release 52 songs (one for each week) in 2008, where he plays every instrument. Gene insisted, however, that this did not mean the end of Bullets and Octane. He was also vague about any possible album, although the songs are available for digital download.

In 2020 Louis appeared as a guest vocalist on the song "Fly Abound" off of the album Fly Around by the bluegrass band Water Tower.

He, Brent Clawson and Kevin Besignano are also members of a side project called Sex N Violence that is rounded out by Todd Hennig (formerly of Death By Stereo), and Criterion Records owner Jeremy Miller.

== Influences ==
As a band, Bullets and Octane are influenced by Guns N' Roses and Social Distortion.
