= National Academy of Songwriters =

National Academy of Songwriters was a music industry association that provided a support network for songwriters, and awarded honors in various categories. Originally founded by Helen King as Songwriters Resources and Services, she saw a need to provide an inexpensive copyright service, as well as educational services for aspiring writers in Los Angeles and around the US.

After King died, her staff kept the organization going for almost two decades. Key staff members included Gelsa Paladino, Doug Thiele, Billy James, Bruce Kaplan, Pat and Pete Luboff, Kevin Odegard, Mark Spier, Gordon Pagoda, Paul Zollo, Steve Schalchlin, Dan Kirkpatrick, Madeleine Smith, Sunny Hilden, Dan Kimple, Rik Lawrence and Kevin McCarley. Hundreds of songwriters came through to learn the craft and business of songwriting and get advice on how to market their songs. The organization also lobbied for better copyright protection, and published the magazine SongTalk, a newsprint publication with original interviews of hit songwriters.

In December 1985, the National Academy of Songwriters began their annual "Salute To The American Songwriter" concerts which over the years featured performances by artists such as Carole King, Jackson Browne, Stevie Wonder, Los Lobos, Willie Dixon, Atlantic Starr, Stephen Stills, Michael Bolton, Melissa Manchester, Stephen Bishop, Brian Wilson, Linda Ronstadt, Kim Carnes, Michael McDonald, and many others. Also performing over the years at the "Salute To The American Songwriter" concerts were songwriting legends such as Jerry Leiber and Mike Stoller, Barry Mann, Jimmy Webb, Jay Livingston and Ray Evans, Robert B. Sherman, Richard Sherman, John Bettis, Diane Warren, and many others. In 1988, the National Academy of Songwriters teamed with VH-1 for the "Fourth Annual Salute To The American Songwriter" which was televised on VH-1 and Showtime in 1989.

In 1996, the Los Angeles Songwriters Showcase (LASS) joined the NAS, and later, the NAS merged into the Songwriters Guild of America.

Another organization that was inspired by the goals of the LASS and came into existence in late 1998 in the vacuum that was created when LASS disappeared was the Los Angeles Songwriters Network (SongNet).
