= Cat Ce =

American comedian

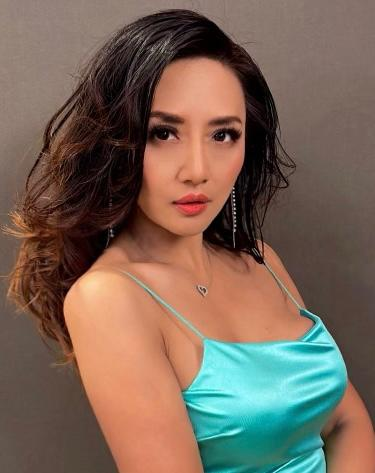
- Cat Ce in 2024
- Born: Sichuan, China
- Other names: Catherine Chen
- Citizenship: United States of America
- Occupations: Comedian; Actress; Writer; Producer
- Years active: 2007-present
- Website: http://CatCeComedy.com

Catherine Chen, known professionally as Cat Ce is an American stand-up comedian and actress based in Los Angeles, California. She is best known for her stand-up comedy and regularly appears at venues throughout the Southern California area, including The Ice House in Pasadena, The Comedy Store in Hollywood, the Laugh Factory, and Hollywood Improv. She has also headlined her own comedy shows at Jimmy Kimmel's Comedy Club, Irvine Improv, and Brea Improv

Her comedy videos on TikTok, Instagram, Facebook, and YouTube have been viewed more than one hundred fifty million times as of 2024. She has also launched her own podcast "Cat Jam In The Car", which is self-produced. She completed a one hour comedy special audio album called Perfect Chinglish on Nov 2024, which was distributed by Comedy Dynamics.

== Early life and education ==
Chen was born in China before moving to Los Angeles to pursue her entertainment career.

== Career ==
Chen has made appearances in films and television, including Snowfall and Space Jam: A New Legacy.

Chen's comedy career took off when she rose to fame on the Clubhouse social media network in 2021 and began hosting her own stand-up comedy shows at small venues throughout Southern California. She scored her first win at the Jeff Ross Roast Battle at The Comedy Store.

In 2022 and 2023, Chen continued to produce and perform at comedy shows throughout Southern California including "Cat Ce & Friends" at The Ice House, Bourbon Room, The Hollywood Roosevelt, and TCL Chinese Theatre, including multiple charity benefit shows for causes such as Crazy Funny Asians 3, Stop Asian Hate, and Children's Miracle Network Hospitals. She has also made appearances in Las Vegas at the LA Comedy Club and Jimmy Kimmel's Comedy Club. In 2024, Chen headlined numerous shows at The Ice House, Jimmy Kimmel's Comedy Club, Irvine Improv, Brea Improv, and has scheduled 2024 tour dates at Cap City Comedy in Austin, Dallas Comedy Club, Helium in Portland, Mic Drop Mania in Chandler amongst several other announced dates and cities throughout the remainder of 2024 and 2025.

Chen's comedy special Perfect Chinglish is scheduled to be released on Comedy Dynamics on 23 December 2025. The 44-minute comedy special was filmed at Jimmy Kimmel's Comedy Club in Las Vegas.

== Podcasts ==
Chen has a podcast with a variety of guests called Cat Jam in the Car. Some of the guests include:

- Los Angeles Lakers owner Johnny Buss
- Television personality Jenn Sterger
- Stand-up comedian Craig Shoemaker
- Chinese Australian actress Shuang Hu
- Actor and comedian Darrell Hammond.
