= Songwriters Guild of America =

American songwriters' organization (founded 1931)

- Formation: 1931
- Founder: Billy Rose; George W. Meyer; Edgar Leslie
- Headquarters: Brentwood, Tennessee
- Subsidiaries: Songwriters Guild Foundation
- Website: https://www.songwritersguild.com/
- Formerly called: Songwriters Protective Association; American Guild of Authors and Composers (AGAC)

The Songwriters Guild of America (SGA) is an American organization created to "advance, promote, and benefit" the profession of songwriters. It was founded in 1931 as the Songwriters Protective Association by Billy Rose, George W. Meyer and Edgar Leslie. SGA issued the first standard songwriters contract in 1932 and most writers consider it the 'standard' agreement in the industry. in 1982, SGA moved its executive office from New York City to Nashville area (Brentwood, Tennessee). As of February 2012, the Songwriters Guild of America, Inc., has been operating as a Tennessee corporation. Since 1973, SGA has a separate subsidiary, the Songwriters Guild Foundation, which has been organized as a New York corporation.

In 1976, the SGA, along with the RIAA, was one of the driving forces behind the creation of the Copyright Act of 1976. In July 1999, a similar but much smaller organization — National Academy of Songwriters based in Los Angeles — closed and recommended that its 3,000 members join the Songwriters Guild of America. NAS's impetus for closing was a concession of unnecessary redundancies of the two organizations striving for the same goal.

Rick Carnes has been the president for the last twenty-three years.

The Songwriters Guild features online and offline classes in songwriting and the music business. Other features include contract review for members, in-depth song evaluations, royalty collection services and music industry resources.

== History ==
The Songwriters Protective Association was formed in 1931 partly as a counterweight to the Music Publishers Protective Association, which was founded in 1917. It gave creative talent some institutional heft in dealings with increasingly corporatized publishers, producers, record companies, and studios.

== Name changes ==
In May 1958, the organization changed its name from Songwriters Protective Association to the American Guild of Authors and Composers (AGAC). In the 1980s, the organization changed its name to Songwriters Guild of America.

== Presidents & executive directors ==
=== Presidents ===
- 1931–19??: Billy Rose
- 1936–1942: Irving Caesar
- 1942–1951: Sigmund Romberg
- 1952–1955: Charles Tobias
- 1955–1957: Abel Baer (1893–1976)
- 1957–1966: Burton Lane
- 1968–1972: Edward Eliscu
- 1973–1982: Ervin Drake
- 1982–2000: George David Weiss
- 2002–current: Rick Carnes (née Charles Frederick Carnes; born 1950)

=== Executive directors ===
- Miriam Rose Stern (1912–1990)
- (19??–2005): Lewis Bachman (1934–2006)
- (2005–2008): Rundi Ann Ream (born 1962)

== See also ==
- National Academy of Songwriters
- National Academy of Popular Music
- Songwriters Hall of Fame
