= California Bluegrass Association =

US non-profit organization

The California Bluegrass Association (CBA) is a California Non-Profit Corporation which was founded in 1975 in the San Francisco Bay Area by Carl Pagter. The CBA is dedicated to the furtherance of Bluegrass, Old-Time, and Gospel Music in California. The Articles of Incorporation further state that the organization is formed to promote, encourage, foster, and cultivate the preservation, appreciation, understanding, enjoyment, support, and performance of traditional instrumental and vocal music of the United States.

The California Bluegrass Association has sponsored dozens of bluegrass festivals since its inception. The organization's main festival, held every Father's Day Weekend in June, is a four-day event at the Nevada County Fairgrounds in Grass Valley, California. This festival annually features a line-up of national and regional acts in the bluegrass and old-time country music field. It is preceded by a four-day music camp. The CBA also sponsors events in Bakersfield, and Sebastopol.
