= The Ice House (comedy club) =

Comedy club in Pasadena, California, US

Coordinates: 34.146591°N 118.130637°W

The Ice House Comedy Club is a comedy club located at 24 Mentor Avenue in Pasadena, California.

The Ice House continues to thrive and during its many decades of operation has entertained over four million people.

== History ==
In 1960, Willard Chilcott opened The Ice House (at 24 N. Mentor Avenue), and soon after, partnered with Bob Stane, a "folk music icon".

From 1960 to 1978, The Ice House, was a folk music club with touring acts coming from around the country to perform, originally managed by Keith Pearce, a.k.a., "O'Brien".

The Ice House in Pasadena was connected with The Ice House (234 S. Brand Blvd) in Glendale (later, The Sopwith Camel), that, at one point, was called The Under The Ice House.

From 1960 to 1978, comedians appeared at the club. In 1978, the original owners were bought out by a trio of investors led by Bob Fisher who changed the format of the club to stand-up comedy.

Johnny Buss bought The Ice House in 2019. A few months after his purchase, the club closed due to the COVID-19 pandemic. Buss took the opportunity to renovate the club, which re-opened in 2023 after a three-year hiatus and $4 million overhaul.

== Notable people ==
Among performers who have recorded some of the more than 75 live albums at the club are the Smothers Brothers, Gallagher, Lily Tomlin, Pat Paulsen, Richard Jeni and George Lopez.

Other comedians who have performed at the Ice House include: Bob Newhart, George Carlin, Robin Williams, David Letterman, Jim Carrey, Jay Leno, Dennis Miller, Howie Mandel, Jerry Seinfeld, Billy Crystal, Steve Martin, Ellen DeGeneres, Roseanne Barr, Garry Shandling, Sinbad, Bill Hicks, Bill Maher, Gabe Kaplan, Paula Poundstone, Rosie O'Donnell, Cheech & Chong, Tim Allen, Paul Rodriguez, Kathy Griffin, Dana Carvey, Joey Diaz, Bill Burr, Arsenio Hall, Joe Rogan, Chris D’Elia, Bert Kreischer, Theo Von, Ken Jeong, Helen Hong, D. L. Hughley, Jimmy O. Yang and Cat Ce.
