= Huck Finn Jubilee =

American Bluegrass Festival

- Status: Active
- Genre: Festival
- Frequency: Annually
- Locations: San Dimas, California
- Country: United States
- Years active: 1974-present
- Founder: Don Tucker
- Most recent: October 7–9, 2022
- Previous event: 44th Annual Huck Finn Jubilee
- Next event: 45th Annual Huck Finn Jubilee
- Attendance: 1,000
- Area: San Dimas, CA
- Website: huckfinn.com

The Huck Finn Jubilee Bluegrass Music Festival or simply The Huck Finn Jubilee is an annual two-day bluegrass music event held in San Dimas, CA. It is held during the fall at Bonelli Bluffs RV and Camping Resort featuring RV and tent camping, traditional "Americana" activities, and live bluegrass music. The festival also features activities, camping, kids zone, food and beverages, live art, music workshops, local vendors, and arts and crafts. The event is also the West Coast’s biggest bluegrass festival, with acts such as The String Cheese Incident, Ralph Stanley, Steve Martin & the Steep Canyon Rangers, and Rhonda Vincent. On September 30, 2016 the Greater Ontario Convention & Visitors Bureau announced that 2016 would be the last festival sponsored by it at the Cucamonga-Guasti Regional Park. However, in 2017, a family purchased the event from the city and revived it in 2018.

== History ==
The history of the Jubilee began in Norco, California in the early 70's. Tuckers, David "Russ" and Maureen Russell, Steve and Sandy Perault and Christianson each had a hand in making it a success before it ever moved to and including Victorville.

The Huck Finn Jubilee Bluegrass Music Festival was founded by Don Tucker and his family in 1976 and was eventually held at the Mojave Narrows Regional Park in Victorville, California, on Father's Day weekend. The festival, which at first featured mostly local talent as the bluegrass entertainment, achieved success in its first few years, with attendance as high as 7,000.

In 1989, Bobby Osborne of bluegrass duo The Osborne Brothers called Tucker to ask if he would book them for Friday night, as they were "stuck on the West Coast". In the following years after their performance at the Huck Finn Jubilee Bluegrass Music Festival, Tucker began booking national talent such as The Country Gentlemen, The Seldom Scene, Jimmy Martin, J.D. Crowe, Larry Sparks, Tony Rice, Earl Scruggs, Ricky Skaggs, Lonesome River Band, among others. In 2001, the Huck Finn Jubilee was named the bluegrass event of the year by the International Bluegrass Music Association.

After Don Tucker died in 2012, the festival moved to Cucamonga-Guasti Regional Park in Ontario, California, for the following year. In May 2014, Michael Krouse and the Greater Ontario Convention & Visitors Bureau acquired the festival to ensure its continuation.

In November 2014, Huck Finn Jubilee officials announced that starting in 2015, the festival will be held annually during the second weekend in June to facilitate event planning and avoid potential conflict with the Telluride Bluegrass Festival, which is held the third weekend in June.

In Spring of 2017, The festival moved to the fall for cooler weather and to avoid conflict with the plethora of festivals happening throughout the summer in Los Angeles.

2020 Festival was held on 10/25/2020 and was entirely pre-recorded and virtual.

The event has since relocated to San Dimas, California and is typically held during the first week of October.

== Acts ==
Notable performers at the event include acts such as Sam Bush, The String Cheese Incident, Ralph Stanley, Rhonda Vincent, Del McCoury Band, David Byrne, Cherryholmes, Dixie Chicks, New Monsoon, Sharon Gilchrist, Railroad Earth, Emmylou Harris, Alison Krauss and Union Station, Willie Nelson, Robert Plant, Yonder Mountain String Band, Peter Rowan, Leftover Salmon, Béla Fleck, Chris Thile, Noam Pikelny, Tim O'Brien, Counting Crows, Nickel Creek, Lyle Lovett, Steve Martin and the Steep Canyon Rangers among others.

== See also ==
- List of bluegrass music festivals
- List of festivals in the United States
- Ontario, California

== Gallery ==
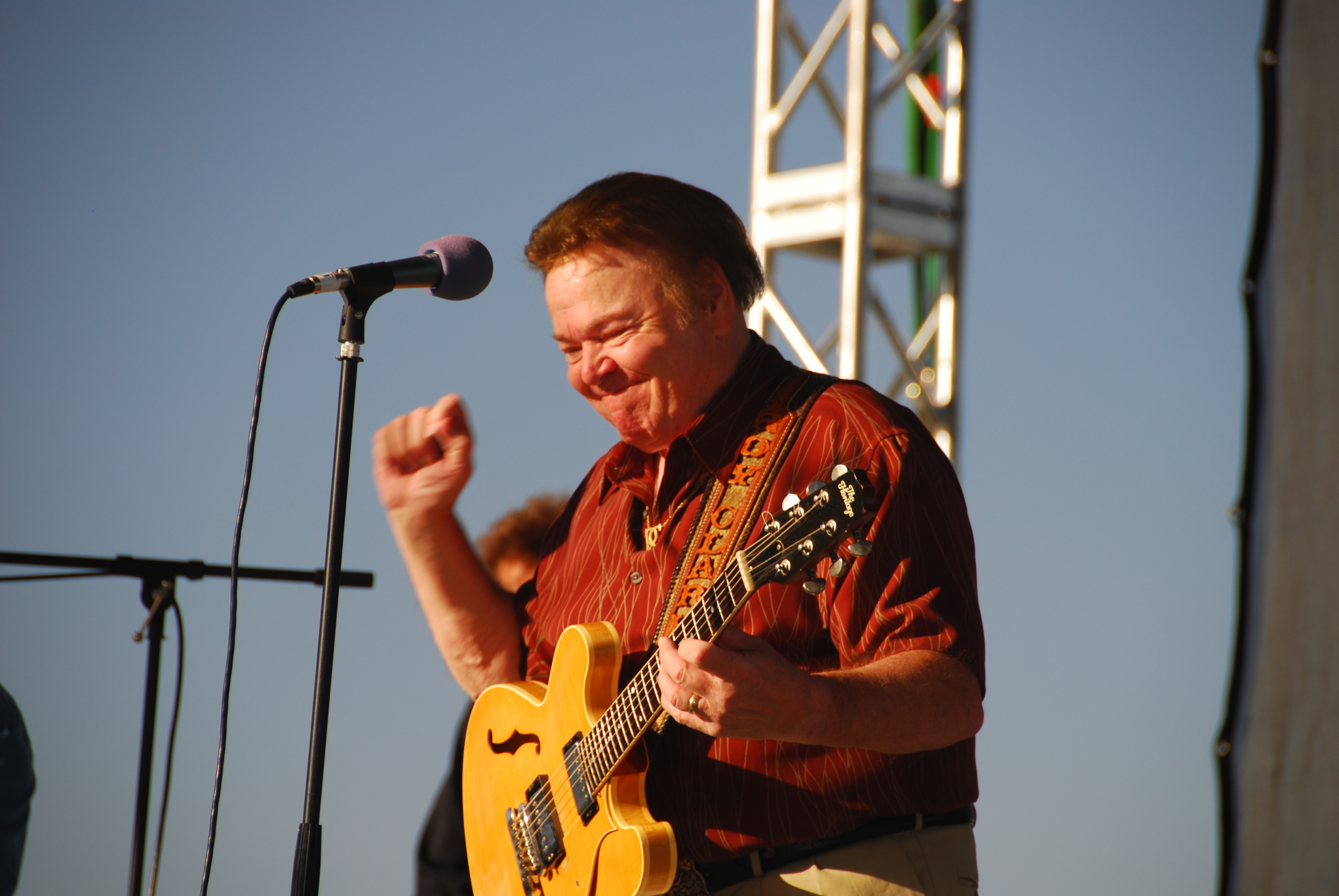
Roy Clark at the 2007 Huck Finn Festival

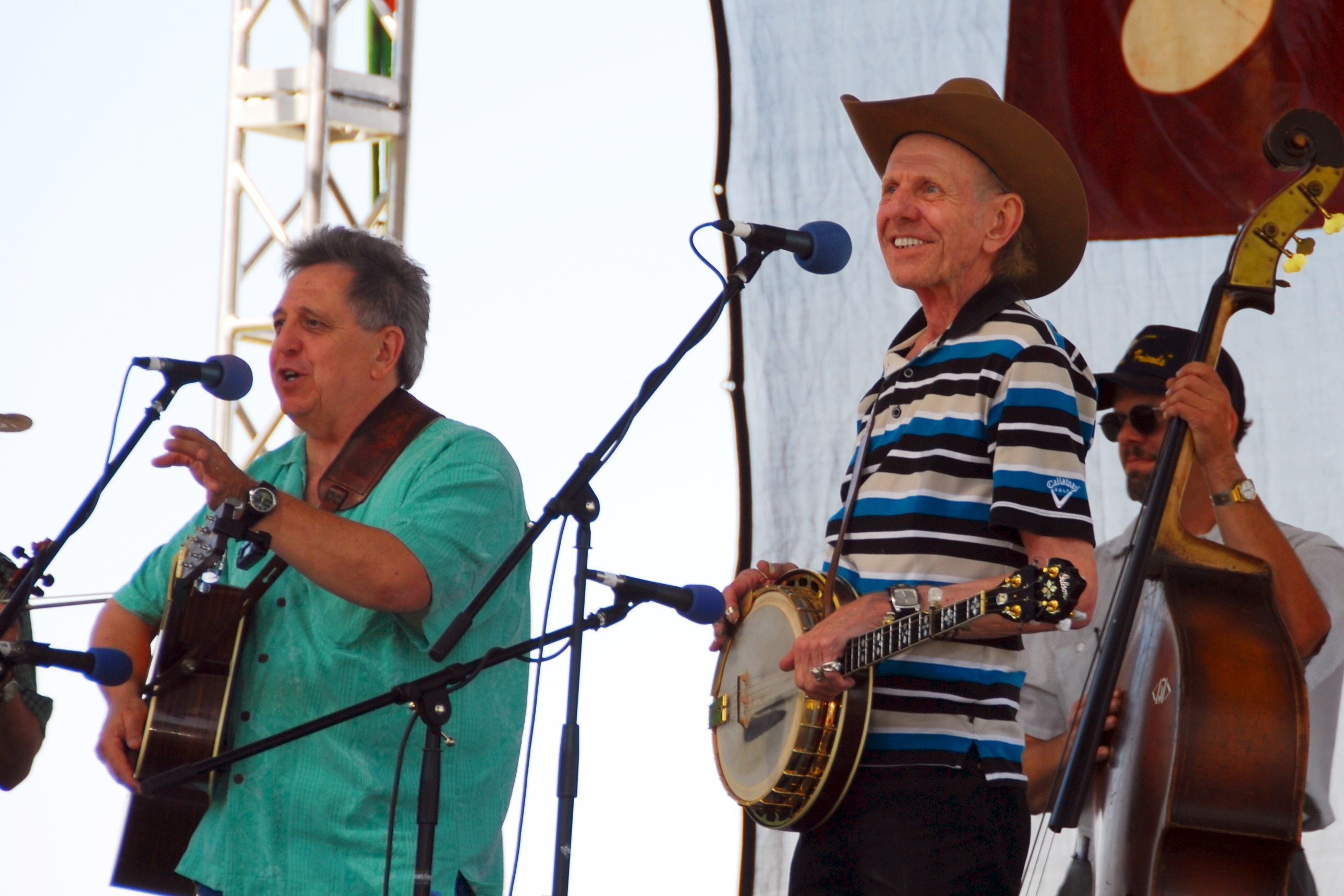
Rodney and Doug Dillard (The Dillards) at the 2007 Huck Finn Festival

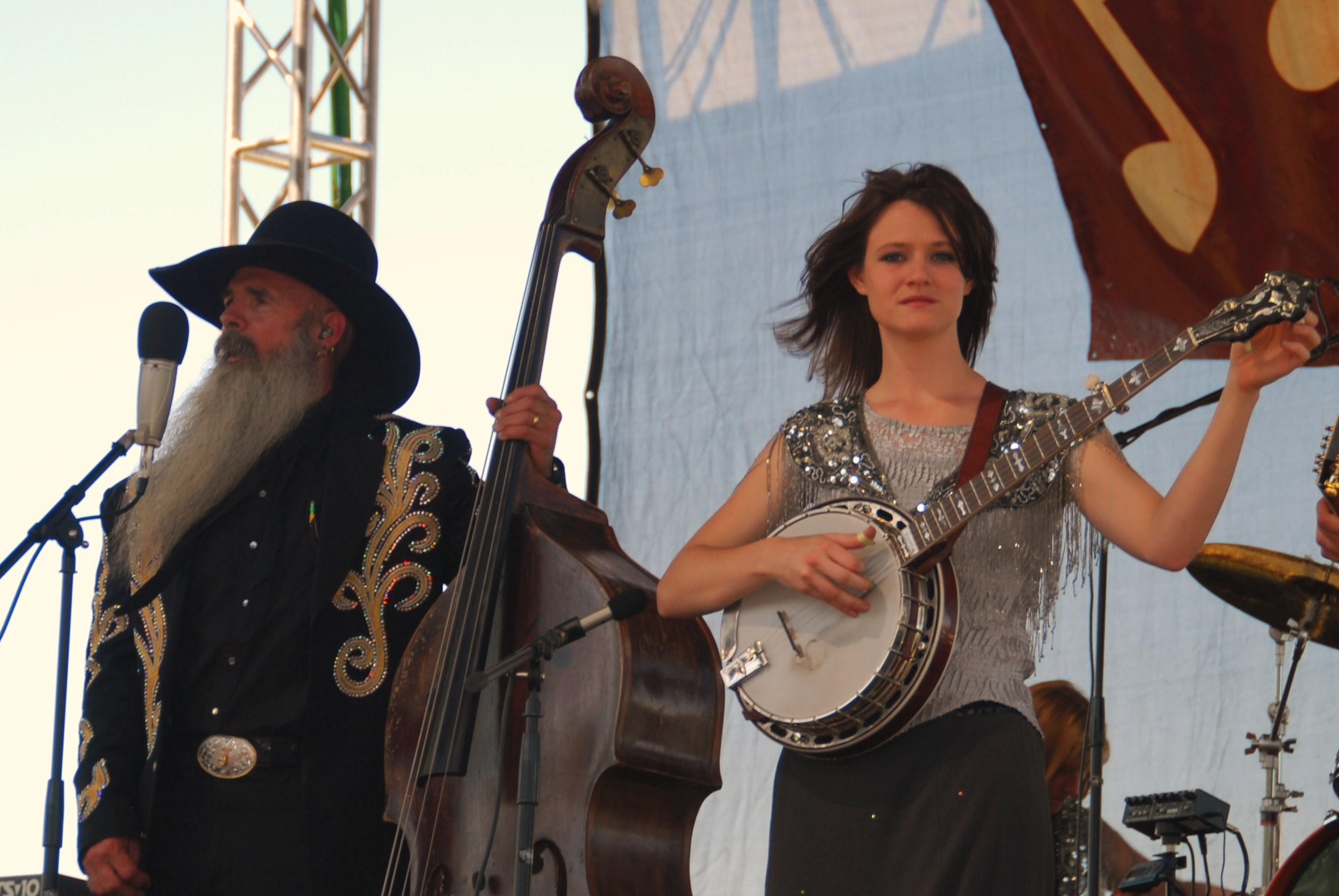
Cherryholmes at the 2007 Huck Finn Festival

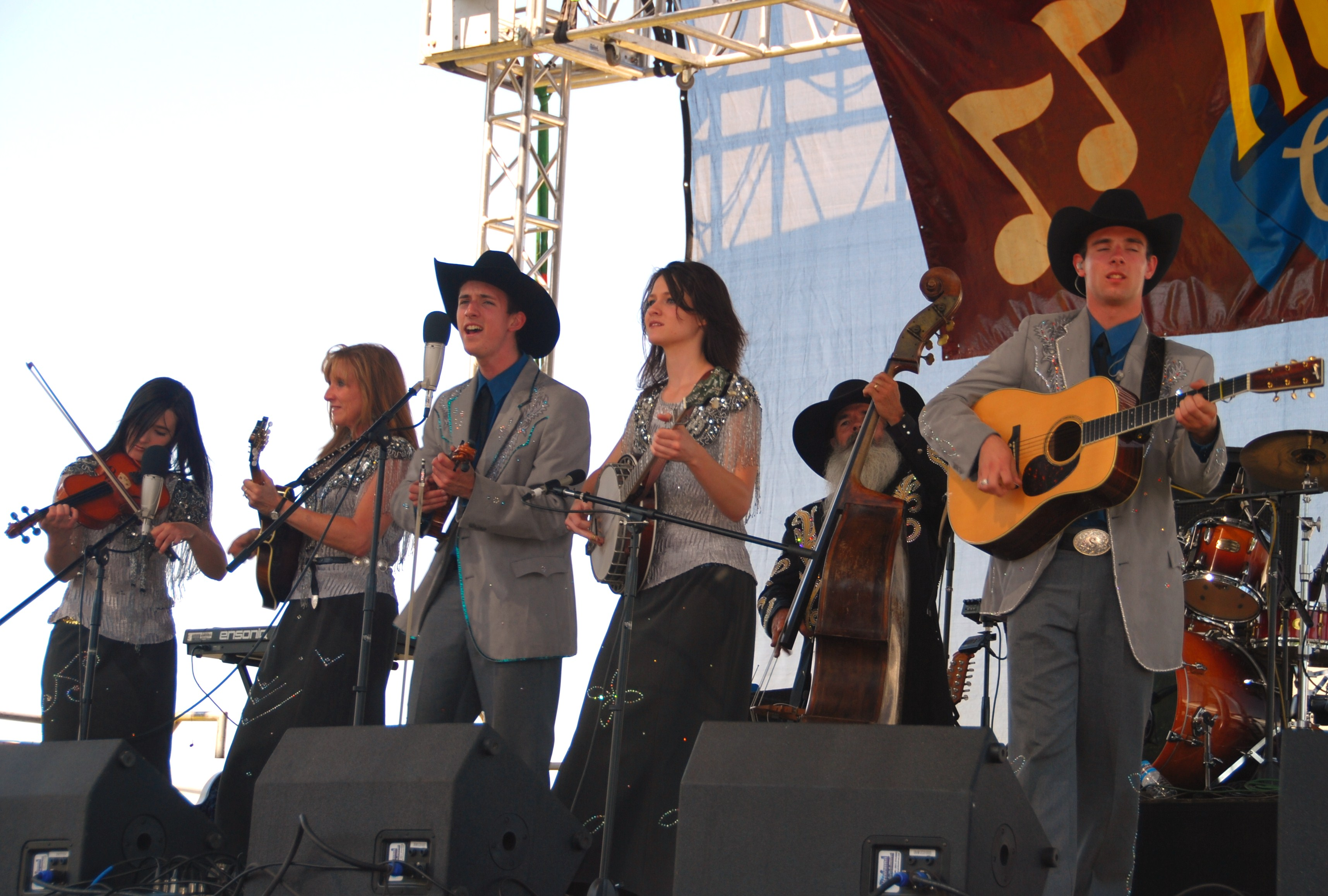
Cherryholmes at the 2007 Huck Finn Festival

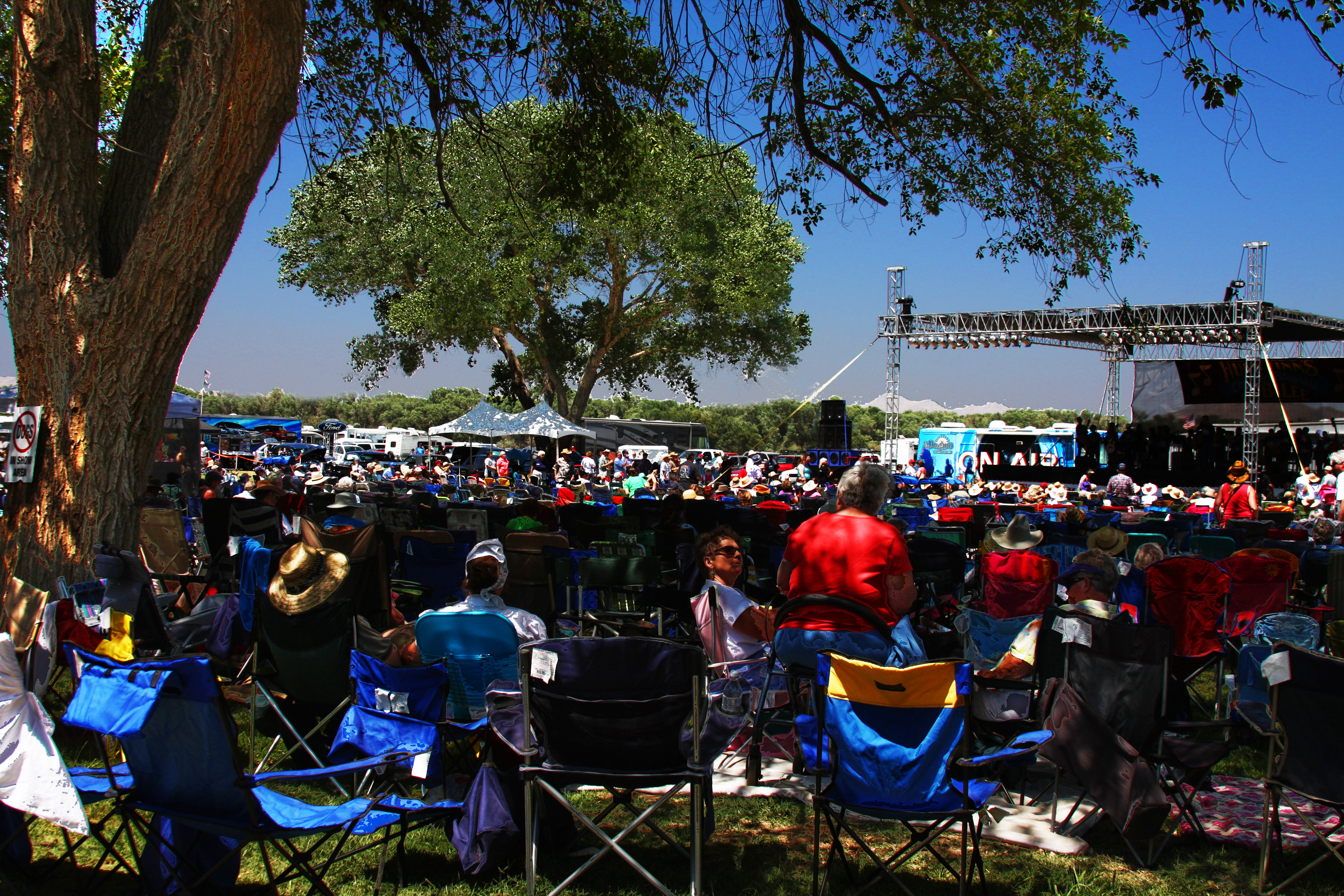
Huck Finn Jubilee and Bluegrass Festival in 2009
