= Bullets and Octane =

American hard rock band

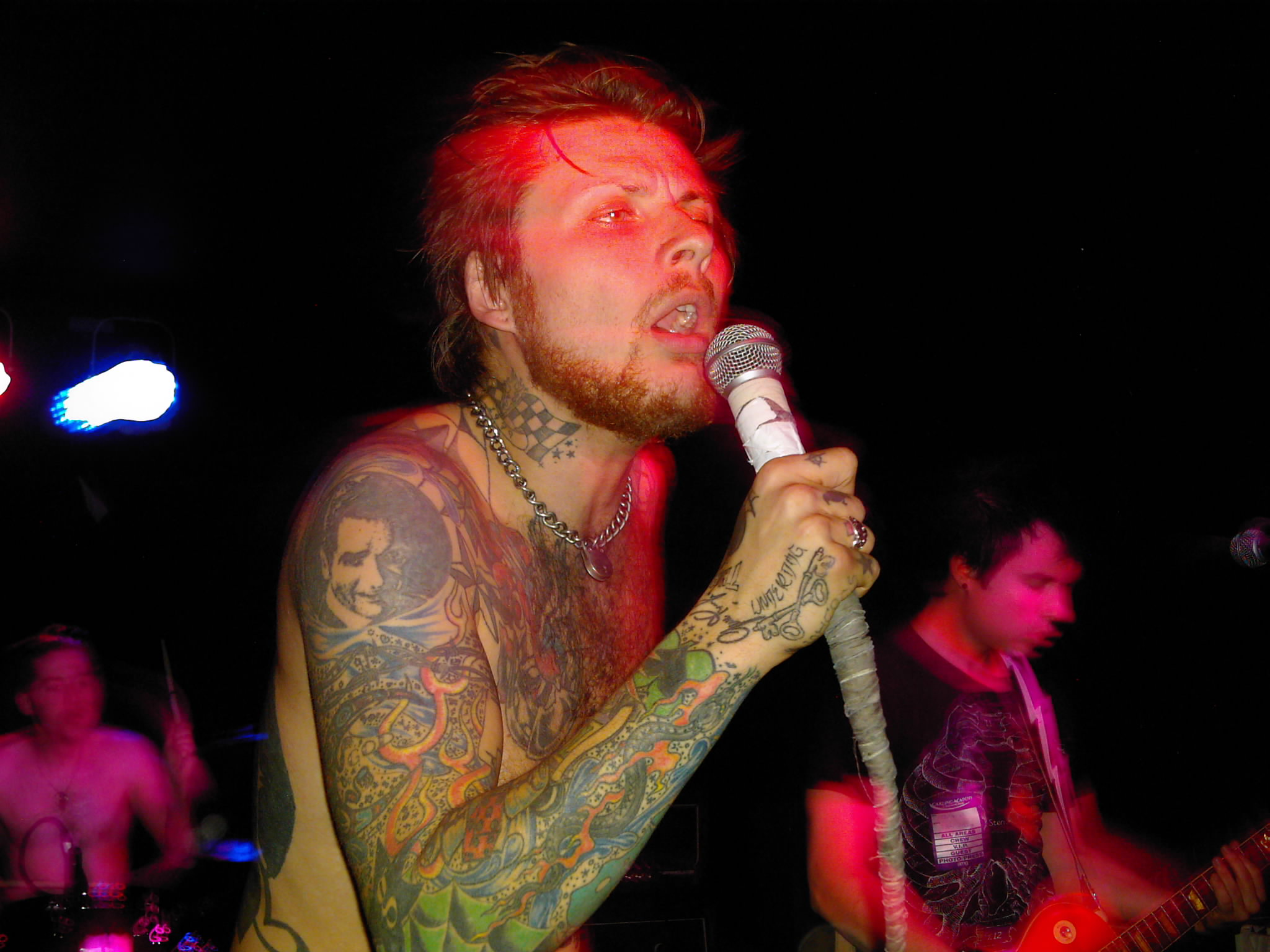
- Singer Gene Louis performing in 2007

Background information
- Origin: St. Louis, Missouri, United States
- Genres: Hard rock; punk rock
- Years active: 1998–present
- Labels: RCA; Cargo; Artery Global; ARES; Criterion
- Members: Gene Louis; Felipe Rodrigo; Zachary Kibbee; Jonny Udell
- Past members: Brent Clawson; Jack Tankersley; James Daniel; Nate Large; Matt Rainwater; Kevin Tapia; Brian Totten; Skye Vaughan-Jayne; Kevin Besignano; Ty Smith; Taylor Sullivan
- Website: www.bulletsmusic.com

Bullets and Octane is a hard rock band originally from St. Louis, Missouri and later based in Southern California (as referenced in the song "Cancer California"). They originate from the band Ultrafink (which released one album titled Carbotrolly, currently out of print). The band has been touring in Europe and North America since December 31, 1998, playing as a support band for Avenged Sevenfold, Stone Sour, Social Distortion, Bad Religion, Eagles of Death Metal and Flogging Molly, CKY (band), amongst others, as well as headlining their own tours.

== History ==
=== 2003–2005: Criterion Records ===
In 2003 Bullets and Octane released an EP, called One Night Stand Rock N' Roll Band on Criterion Records which is owned by their long-time hometown friend, and Sex N Violence frontman, Jeremy Miller, In 2003 they released their first and only DVD The Revelry also on Criterion Records. In 2004, they released their second EP, Bullets 'N' Octane on Criterion before later in the year releasing their first album which was also titled The Revelry on Criterion Records, (Later Re-Released on Ares Records), which featured some remastered/re-recorded tracks off their EPs.

=== 2006–2007: RCA Records ===
Their second album, In the Mouth of the Young, was released in April 2006 as the band's major label debut on Sony BMG/RCA Records. The band also released a cover of Billy Idol's "Rebel Yell" for a local So-Cal Sampler, which also featured as a hidden track at the end of their self-titled EP, and an unreleased original B-side "Mannequin", was leaked onto the Internet shortly after. The band toured with the Family Values Tour 2006, along with such bands as Dir En Grey, Korn, Flyleaf, Stone Sour and Deftones. While this marked the first time opening up to such a large audience, they were previously support to Avenged Sevenfold on their City Of Evil Tour.

Bullets and Octane gained a steady growing fan base, most notably in California, and also a large portion in Europe due to touring and distribution.

Their Song "Pirates" was included in the 2005 video game MX vs. ATV Unleashed. In 2006, a demo variant of their song "Save Me Sorrow" was used as one of the list of songs used by WWE for their biggest pay-per-view event, Wrestlemania 22. They would collaborate further with the WWE in 2006, as another song, "I Ain't Your Savior", was included in WWE Smackdown vs. Raw 2007.

After releasing one album with RCA, the band left the label and began working with ARES records for their next album, Song for the Underdog, which was released in June 2007 while on tour with Unwritten Law. The CD became available on iTunes after June.

They undertook a UK tour throughout October 2007 with The Knives.

Shortly after, guitarist James Daniel decided to leave the band. Steve Morris (lead guitarist of Unwritten Law) took James's place for the remainder of the band's touring schedule.

=== 2008–2009: Line-up changes and other projects ===
In 2008 James was replaced with Kevin Tapia, who was then replaced by Kevin Besignano, also the guitarist for Unwritten Law. Outside of Bullets And Octane, Gene Louis wrote and recorded one song every week of 2008, he posted the new songs on his Myspace page, and for a time they were available for download.

Ty Smith left the band to be a full-time member in the band Godhead. Ty's place was filled by Brian Totten. Original guitarist Jack Tankersley rejoined the band as well for work on their fourth album.

Bullets and Octane was released on iTunes in April 2009, returning to a sound more reminiscent of their older material than Song for the Underdog.

On July 10, 2009, the band announced that their upcoming release, Laughing in the Face Of Failure would be available on October 6. The release is made up of their two previous albums (Song for the Underdog and the self-titled album) as well as 3 B-sides: a new version of Pirates and two previously unreleased tracks: Murder Maria and Chemicals. This is a physical release as opposed to Bullets' last release which was available only as a download.

November 2009 saw Bullets heading out on a US/UK tour with Wednesday 13's new band Gunfire 76 as well as a number of unsigned bands around the UK.

=== 2010–2015: "15" and The Brave Ones, hiatus ===
Gene and Kevin began focusing on their side project The Brave Ones, making 2010 a quiet year for Bullets And Octane. The summer of 2011, however, saw the release of a B-sides and Live EP (rumored to be recorded around the release of In The Mouth Of The Young).

In July 2013, Bullets released a new digital album titled "15", in honour of the band's 15th anniversary.

After Kevin's departure from The Brave Ones, Gene started looking for brand new line-up and met Felipe Rodrigo, Taylor Sullivan and Ben Palmer from L.A.-based punk rock band Crash FistFight. The Brave Ones went on to release the full-length album "Los Angeles". After that album was released, Zachary Kibbee joined the band as the third guitarist, playing several shows with the band before its hiatus starting in 2015.

=== 2016–2021: New line-up, "Waking Up Dead" and Cargo Records ===
As of 2016, Gene, along with new members Felipe Rodrigo and Taylor Sullivan of The Brave Ones, and Jonny Udell of The Knives, began working on a new album and released three singles, 'Burning At Both Wicks', 'Bad Motherfucker' and 'Waking Up Dead'.

In July 2016, Bullets and Octane played during the Lost Highway Motorcycle Show and Concert along with Foghat, Brantley Gilbert, Social Distortion, Eagles Of Death Metal and more.

In 2017, Bullets and Octane toured in Sweden and the UK with its new lineup, Taylor Sullivan being replaced by Zachary Kibbee on bass shortly before the tour began.

The band just released a new album "Waking Up Dead" on Cargo Records. The band also just signed with Artery Global Talent Agency. In February and July 2018 the band toured in Europe, including playing Helgea Festivalen on July 5 and had its UK album release show at The Black Heart in London, UK on July 11.

After multiple tours in Europe and a tour of the US in 2018, Bullets and Octane embarked on a 6-week European tour, their longest in several years, starting November 2018 in Finland including several shows opening for CKY in The UK and the Netherlands. Countries included on this tour were Sweden, Germany, Czech Republic, Hungary and Ireland as well as Finland and The UK, according to the band's website.

In May 2019, Bullets went back to the U.K., one of the highlights being the main stage slot at the "Call of the Wild" Music Festival. Bullets also embarked on a headlining tour across Eastern Europe and Scandinavia in November 2019. Recorded during the band's time off from the road, the new album Riot Riot Rock N' Roll is slated for release early 2020 on Bad Mofo/Cargo Records UK.

=== 2021–present: New line-up and Golden Robot Records ===
In March 2021, Felipe, Zach, & Jonny left Bullets to pursue other musical endeavors, eventually forming The Mercury Riots, By May of that same year, it was revealed that Bullets had signed a contract with Golden Robot Records. In November, pictures of Gene with new band members emerged on social media; however, their names are yet to be revealed.

== Band members ==
=== Current ===
- Gene Louis – lead vocals
- Clay Villain - guitar
- Louis Collins - bass
- Dylan Roy - drums
- Jack Cash - guitar/ backing vocals

=== Former ===
- Felipe Rodrigo – guitar, backing vocals
- Zachary Kibbee – bass guitar, backing vocals
- Jonny Udell – drums
- Brent Clawson – bass guitar
- Taylor Sullivan – bass guitar
- Ty Smith – drums
- Jack Tankersley – guitar
- Skye Vaughan-Jayne – guitar
- James Daniel – guitar
- Nate Large – guitar
- Matt Rainwater – drums
- Kevin Tapia – guitar
- Brian Totten – drums
- Kevin Besignano – rhythm guitar

== Discography ==
Albums:

- The Revelry (2004)
- In the Mouth of the Young (2006)
- Song for the Underdog (2007)
- Bullets and Octane (2009)
- 15 (2013)
- Waking Up Dead (2018)
- Riot Riot Rock n' Roll (2020)
- Bullets and Octane (2026)

Compilations:

- Laughing in the Face of Failure (2009)
- Demos and B-Sides (2024)
- Demos and B-Sides, Sweet Lil Sing Alongs, 1999-20?? (2025)

EPs:

- One Night Stand Rock N' Roll Band (2003)
