= Topanga Banjo and Fiddle Contest =

Annual music festival in California, US

Coordinates: 34.1047°N 118.7091°W

Topanga Banjo•Fiddle Contest is a music festival and competition, held annually at Paramount Ranch, a unit of the Santa Monica Mountains National Recreation Area, in Agoura Hills, California. It began in 1961 in Topanga Canyon, California. The main genre of music is bluegrass, but other acoustic music, folk singing and folk dancing are presented. The contest includes a random mix of beginning, intermediate and advanced players, professional players, string bands and dancers.

== History ==
The first competition the "Banjo Pickers and Open Fiddling Contest", created jointly by Margot Slocum and Margaret Jean "Peg" Engwall Benepe, was a music-only event held in 1961. Twenty-six Five-String Banjo Pickers, five Fiddlers, four Judges and five hundred fans attended that first gathering amid the California Scrub Oak of the Santa Monica Mountains. For the next eight years it was held on the grounds of the 1920s-era "Camp Wildwood" until a 1969 city ordinance forced a move to large venues. The next nineteen years saw the festival move around Southern California until finally landing at its current location at the Paramount Ranch near Agoura Hills, California, near its origins.

The Topanga Banjo•Fiddle Contest was the forerunner of many folk art festivals. Many of Topanga's contestants have gone on to become professional musicians. Numerous stars and musicians have participated, including Jackson Browne, David Lindley, Taj Mahal, John Hartford, Byron Berline, Dan Crary, Frank Hamilton, Erik Darling, John Hickman, Stuart Duncan, Peter Tork and Steve Martin.

A virtual contest was held in 2020.

== See also ==
- Kerrville Folk Festival
- Newport Folk Festival
- Philadelphia Folk Festival
