= Adair (band) =

American rock band

- Origin: St. Louis, Missouri, U.S.
- Genres: Post-hardcore; screamo; emo; alternative metal
- Years active: 2001–2007, 2015 (reunion)
- Label: Warcon Enterprises
- Past members: Rob Tweedie; Josh Goldenhersh; Patrick Baum; Matt Tuttle; Jeff Meyer; Mike Jost; Josiah Werner; Greg Haupt; Jerry Jost; James Grossenheider; Jared Willis

Adair was an American rock band from St. Louis, Missouri. The members of the band had performed together in St. Louis for eight years performing under the moniker of Disturbing the Peace before formally changing their name to Adair in 2001. The final five-member band consisted of local St. Louisans; Rob Tweedie as frontman, both Josh Goldenhersh and Patrick Baum on guitar and vocals, Matt Tuttle on drums, and Jeff Meyer on bass guitar. After recording their premiere EP The Permanent Bruise, the band moved to California.

After touring with other bands (including Hawthorne Heights, Glasseater, Calico System, and A Wilhelm Scream) and independently selling over 7,000 copies of The Permanent Bruise, Adair signed with Warcon Enterprises in 2006. While performing in 2006's Taste of Chaos tour, the band released their only full album, The Destruction of Everything is the Beginning of Something New, that February. The band spent Summer 2006 on that year's Warped Tour.

When the constituent band members opted to pursue their own individual musical interests, Adair disbanded in early 2007. In their MySpace blog, the band euphemistically described the dissolution as "[going] on indefinite hiatus."

In 2015, the band reunited to play two "final" shows, one on October 1 in St. Louis, and Taste of Chaos in San Bernardino on October 3.
